= 2010 Timiskaming District municipal elections =

Elections were held in the organized municipalities in the Timiskaming District of Ontario on October 25, 2010 in conjunction with municipal elections across the province. An X beside a candidate indicates the candidate is the incumbent.

Across the region, Doug Shearer and Bill Brookfield were elected as school trustees on District School Board Ontario North East, Martin Drainville, Rick Brassard and Steve Malciw were elected to the Northeastern Catholic District School Board and Roger Brazeau was elected to the Conseil scolaire de district du Nord-Est de l'Ontario.

== Armstrong ==
Incumbent reeve Jules Gravel was acclaimed in Armstrong. Robert Éthier, Jean-Marc Boileau, Georges Daviau and Dominique Nackers were elected to council.

Reeve Candidate	Vote	%
Jules Gravel (X)	Acclaimed	

== Brethour ==
Arla West was acclaimed in Brethour. Brad Noyes, Russell Britton, Kieven Bennewies and Julie Wilkinson were elected to council.

Reeve Candidate	Vote	%
Arla West	Acclaimed	

== Casey ==
Incumbent reeve Guy Labonte was acclaimed back into office in Casey. Marc Robillard, Jacques Fortin, Janet Little and Suzanne Boucher were elected to council.

Reeve Candidate	Vote	%
Guy Labonte (incumbent)	Acclaimed	

== Chamberlain ==
Incumbent reeve Bill Dickinson was acclaimed back into office in Chamberlain. Richard Pollock, Shirley Blackburn, Robert Blackburn and Peter Ruel were elected to council.

Reeve Candidate	Vote	%
Bill Dickinson (incumbent)	Acclaimed	

== Charlton and Dack ==
Wayne Pawson defeated incumbent reeve Reta Allan in Charlton and Dack. Debbie Veerman, Merrill Bond, William Laurila and James Bott were elected to council.

Reeve Candidate	Vote	%
Wayne Pawson		
Reta Allan (X)		

== Cobalt ==
Tina Sartoretto was elected mayor of Cobalt. Sue Nielsen, George Othmer, Gino Chitaroni, Mike Harrison, Garry Bigelow and Pat Anderson were elected to council.

Mayoral Candidate	Vote	%
Tina Sartoretto	404	79.53
Doug Wilcox	104	20.47
Council Candidate	Vote	%
Sue Nielsen	353	
George Othmer	322	
Gino Chitaroni	256	
Mike Harrison	247	
Garry Bigelow	221	
Pat Anderson	207	
Michael Minderlein	174	
Daniel Coté	170	
Douglas Gareau	96	

== Coleman ==
Dan Cleroux defeated incumbent mayor Colleen Belanger in Coleman. Lois Perry, Pat Tressider, Susan Côté and Cathy Marcella were elected to council.

Mayoral Candidate	Vote	%
Dan Cleroux		
Colleen Belanger (X)		

== Englehart ==
Incumbent mayor Nina Wallace was acclaimed back into office in Englehart. Pauline Brassard, Douglas Metson, Dianne Peplinski, Twyla Wilson, Annette Wood-Wheeldon and Steph Palmateer were elected to council.

Mayoral Candidate	Vote	%
Nina Wallace (X)	Acclaimed	

== Evanturel ==
Jack Briggs was acclaimed in Evanturel. John Simmons, Kandase Robertson, Derek Mundle and Cindy Kirkbride were elected to council.

Reeve Candidate	Vote	%
Jack Briggs	Acclaimed	

== Gauthier ==
Reeve Candidate	Vote	%

== Harley ==
Gerald Roy will be the reeve of Harley. Auldin Bilow, Pauline Archambault, Clifford Fielder and Richard McNaughton will serve on council.

Reeve Candidate	Vote	%
Gerald Roy		

== Harris ==
Martin Auger was acclaimed in Harris. Wilda Gibson, Wayne Jelly, Peter Gibson and Alan Licop will serve on council.

Reeve Candidate	Vote	%
Martin Auger (incumbent)	Acclaimed	

== Hilliard ==
Morgan Carson will be the reeve of Hilliard. Dan Wark, Bruce Posch, Maurice Laframboise and Erwin Hirschbeck will serve on council.

Reeve Candidate	Vote	%
Morgan Carson		

== Hudson ==
Larry Craig was acclaimed in Hudson. Dan Morrow, Bryan McNair, Greg Seed and Martin Jarvis will serve on council.

Reeve Candidate	Vote	%
Larry Craig	Acclaimed	

== James ==
Incumbent reeve Terry Fiset was acclaimed in James. Henry Baker, David Mullin, Bruce McShane and Janet MacDowall will serve on council.

Reeve Candidate	Vote	%
Terry Fiset (X)	Acclaimed	

== Kerns ==
Terry Phillips will serve as reeve of Kerns. Mark Lenover, Carter Seymour, Stephen Aitchison and Dennis Jib will serve on council.

Reeve Candidate	Vote	%
Terry Phillips		

== Kirkland Lake ==
Incumbent mayor Bill Enouy was re-elected in Kirkland Lake. Tony Antoniazzi, Normand Mino, Todd Morgan, Allan French, Jean-Guy Chamaillard and Tom Barker were elected to council.

Mayoral Candidate	Vote	%
Bill Enouy (X)	2,006	75.7
Karen Suykens	644	24.3

== Larder Lake ==
Patricia Bodick was elected mayor of Larder Lake. Louise Valyear, Paul Kelly, Rickey Vachon and David Larocque were elected to council.

Reeve Candidate	Vote	%
Patricia Bodick	396	85.16
Bruce Dudgeon	69	14.84

== Latchford ==
George Lefebvre defeated incumbent mayor Peter Davies in Latchford. Larry Anderson, Maxine Cannon, Theo Cull, Scott Green, Jo-Anne Cartner and Dave Willcock will serve on council.

Mayoral Candidate	Vote	%
George Lefebvre	183	56.66
Peter Davies (X)	127	39.32
Dave Rideout	11	3.40
Florence Bruneau	2	0.62

== Matachewan ==
Incumbent reeve Bev Hine was re-elected in Matachewan. Joseph Bisson, Nelson Costello, Cheryl Drummond and Guy Dube were elected to council.

Reeve Candidate	Vote	%
Bev Hine (X)	120	53.33
Anne Commando-Dube	89	39.56
Sandra Couture	16	7.11

== McGarry ==
Incumbent reeve Clermont Lapointe was re-elected in McGarry. Bonita Culhane, Matt Reimer, Elaine Fic and Jean-Yves Godin were elected to council.

Reeve Candidate	Vote	%
Clermont Lapointe (X)	220	53.79
Dimitri Kobassa	189	46.21

== Temiskaming Shores ==
Judy Pace, the incumbent mayor of Temiskaming Shores, did not run for re-election. The 2010 election was won by Carman Kidd, a former reeve of Dymond Township prior to the municipal amalgamation of 2004. Doug Jelly, Mike McArthur, Bryan Thornton, Danny Whalen, Bob Hobbs and Jamie Morrow were elected to council.

Mayoral Candidate	Vote	%
Carman Kidd	1,968	54.45
Mike Pearson	1,545	42.75
Mike R. Camp	101	2.79
Council Candidate	Vote	%
Doug Jelly	2,495	
Mike McArthur	2,494	
Bryan Thornton	1,767	
Danny Whalen	1,698	
Bob Hobbs	1,662	
Jamie Morrow	1,517	
Jaime Allen	1,313	
George Depencier	1,210	
Eveline Gauvreau	1,206	

== Thornloe ==
Roy Vottero will serve as reeve of Thornloe. Pauline Charland, Allan Peddie, Pauline Peddie and Earl Reed will serve on council.

Reeve Candidate	Vote	%
Roy Vottero		
