= 2014 Timiskaming District municipal elections =

Elections were held in the organized municipalities in the Timiskaming District of Ontario on October 27, 2014, in conjunction with municipal elections across the province.

== Armstrong ==
| Mayoral Candidate | Vote | % |
|---|---|---|
| Robert Éthier (X) | Acclaimed | |

== Brethour ==
| Reeve Candidate | Vote | % |
|---|---|---|
| Arla West (X) | Acclaimed | |

== Casey ==
| Reeve Candidate | Vote | % |
|---|---|---|
| Guy Labonte (X) | Acclaimed | |

== Chamberlain ==
No election was held for reeve. The matter will be decided by council in December.

| Reeve Candidate | Vote | % |
|---|---|---|
Not held

== Charlton and Dack ==
| Reeve Candidate | Vote | % |
|---|---|---|
| Merrill Norman Bond | Acclaimed | |

== Cobalt ==
| Mayoral Candidate | Vote | % |
|---|---|---|
| Tina Sartoretto (X) | Acclaimed | |

== Coleman ==
| Mayoral Candidate | Vote | % |
|---|---|---|
| Dan Cleroux (X) | Acclaimed | |

== Englehart ==
| Mayoral Candidate | Vote | % |
|---|---|---|
| Nina Wallace (X) | 249 | 53.21 |
| Jesse Redden | 219 | 46.79 |

== Evanturel ==
| Reeve Candidate | Vote | % |
|---|---|---|
| Derek Mundle (X) | Acclaimed | |

== Gauthier ==
| Reeve Candidate | Vote | % |
|---|---|---|
| William K. Johnson (X) | Acclaimed | |

== Harley ==
| Reeve Candidate | Vote | % |
|---|---|---|
| Pauline Archambault (X) | Acclaimed | |

== Harris ==
| Reeve Candidate | Vote | % |
|---|---|---|
| Chantal Despres | Acclaimed | |

== Hilliard ==
| Reeve Candidate | Vote | % |
|---|---|---|
| Morgan Carson (X) | Acclaimed | |

== Hudson ==
| Reeve Candidate | Vote | % |
|---|---|---|
| Larry Craig (X) | Acclaimed | |

== James ==
| Reeve Candidate | Vote | % |
|---|---|---|
| Terry Fisset (X) | Acclaimed | |

== Kerns ==
| Reeve Candidate | Vote | % |
|---|---|---|
| Terry Phillips (X) | Acclaimed | |

== Kirkland Lake ==
| Mayoral Candidate | Vote | % |
|---|---|---|
| Tony Antoniazzi | 1,621 | 50.89 |
| Ken McCann | 1,564 | 49.11 |

== Larder Lake ==
| Mayoral Candidate | Vote | % |
|---|---|---|
| Gary Cunnington | 248 | 65.26 |
| Patricia Bodick (X) | 132 | 34.74 |

== Latchford ==
Latchford had the highest turnout of any municipality in the province at 86.63%.

| Mayoral Candidate | Vote | % |
|---|---|---|
| George Lefebvre (X) | 182 | 63.86 |
| Mac Hamilton | 103 | 36.14 |

== Matachewan ==
| Reeve Candidate | Vote | % |
|---|---|---|
| Cheryl Drummond | 132 | 72.13 |
| Bev Hine (X) | 51 | 27.87 |

== McGarry ==
| Reeve Candidate | Vote | % |
|---|---|---|
| Clermont Lapointe (X) | 206 | 47.47 |
| Matt Reimer | 103 | 23.73 |
| Dimitri Kowbassa | 56 | 12.90 |
| Denis Smith | 55 | 12.67 |
| Rock Dallaire | 14 | 3.23 |

== Temiskaming Shores ==
| Mayoral Candidate | Vote | % |
|---|---|---|
| Carman Kidd (X) | 2,147 | 64.24 |
| Rory Moore | 1,080 | 33.32 |
| Dale Stewart | 101 | 3.02 |

== Thornloe ==
| Reeve Candidate | Vote | % |
|---|---|---|
| Ron Vottero (X) | Acclaimed | |
