= Ontario Highway 65 =

Ontario provincial highway

Highway 65

Route information
- Maintained by the Ministry of Transportation of Ontario
- Length: 123.3 km (76.6 mi)
- Existed: August 7, 1937–present

Major junctions
- West end: Highway 66 near Matachewan
- Highway 560 in Elk Lake; Highway 11 near New Liskeard
- East end: Ontario–Quebec border near Notre-Dame-du-Nord

Location
- Country: Canada
- Province: Ontario

Highway system
- Ontario provincial highways; Current; Former; 400-series
← Highway 64	→ Highway 66

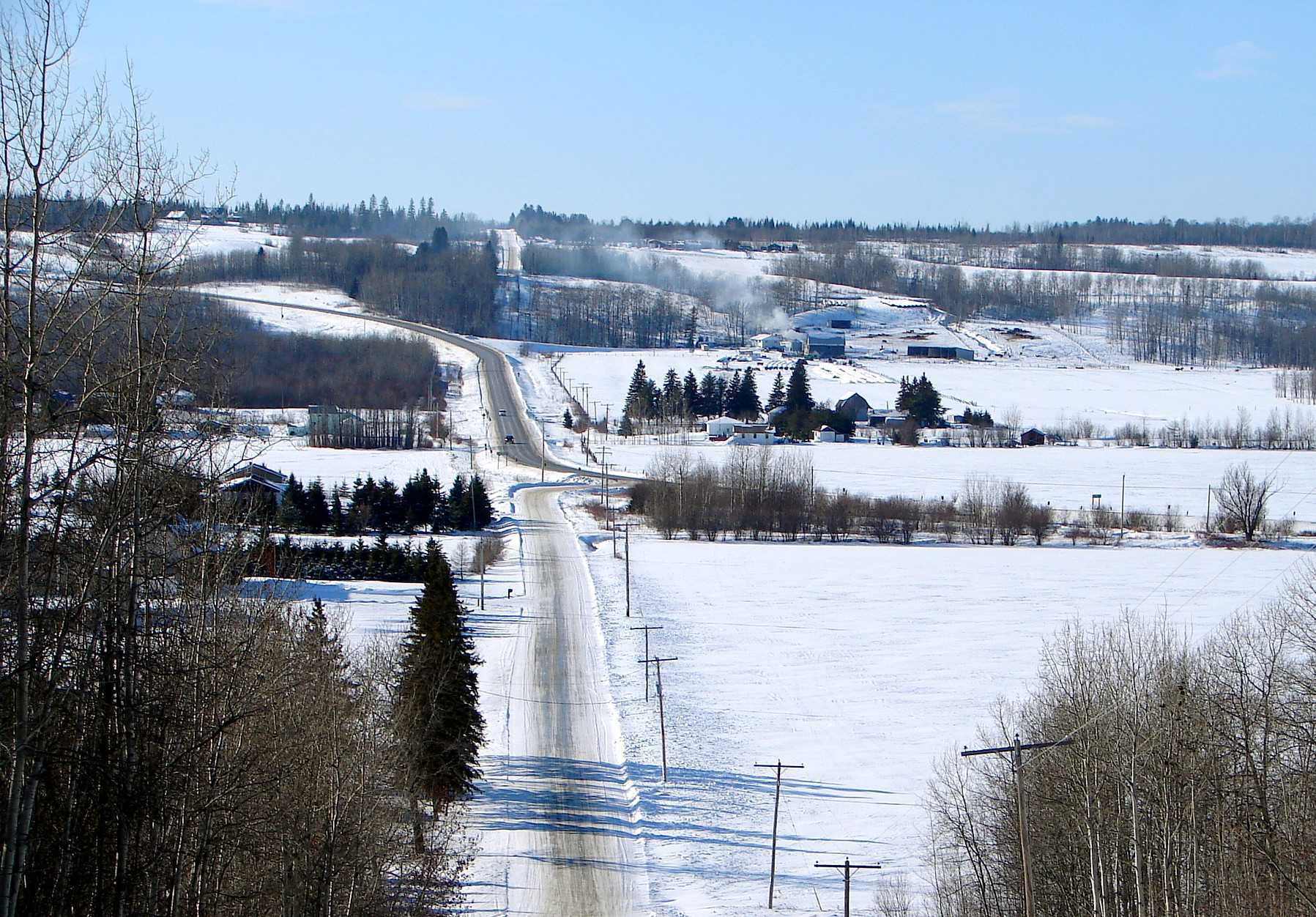
Highway 65 (in distance) near Sutton Bay

King's Highway 65, commonly referred to as Highway 65, is a provincially maintained highway in the Canadian province of Ontario. The route begins at Highway 66 and travels 123.3 kilometres (76.6 mi) southeast to the Quebec border. At its midpoint, the route is concurrent with Highway 11.

Highway 65 was assumed in 1937 following the merger of the Department of Northern Development (DND) with the Department of Highways (DHO). It initially connected Matachewan with Highway 11 at New Liskeard, but was extended east to the Quebec border in 1956. The route has remained unchanged since.

== Route description ==
Highway 65 travels from Highway 66 at a junction east of Matachewan, southeast to New Liskeard then northeast to the Quebec provincial border. The total length of Highway 65 is 123.3 kilometres (76.6 mi). With the exception of the community of Elk Lake, the section of the route between Highway 66 and Highway 11 passes through a remote and sparsely populated wilderness. The route becomes concurrent with Highway 11 and follows that route north for 2.7 kilometres (1.7 mi), bypassing the urban section of New Liskeard in the process. Highway 65 is entirely situated in Timiskaming District. It travels through the communities of Elk Lake, Kenabeek and New Liskeard.

The route's continuation into Quebec does not have a provincial route number, but has developed the name 'Rue Ontario' by the local town of Notre-Dame-du-Nord. Rue Ontario ends at Route 101 in Notre-Dame-du-Nord, 2.6 kilometres (1.6 mi) east of the provincial border.

Like other provincial routes in Ontario, Highway 65 is maintained by the Ministry of Transportation of Ontario. In 2010, traffic surveys conducted by the ministry showed that on average, 4,200 vehicles used the highway daily along the section between Highway 11 and Armstrong Street in New Liskeard while 190 vehicles did so each day along the section between Highway 66 and the bridge over Sydney Creek, the highest and lowest counts along the highway, respectively.

== History ==
Highway 65 was first established on August 7, 1937, when the New Liskeard to Matachewan Road was assumed by the DHO in the days following its merger with the DND on April 1. The route, which initially ended in the east at Highway 11 (the Ferguson Highway), was extended 22.5 kilometres (14.0 mi) east to the Ontario–Quebec border on February 22, 1956. It has remained unchanged since.

== Major intersections ==
The following table lists the major junctions along Highway 65, as noted by the Ministry of Transportation of Ontario.

Division	Location	km	mi	Destinations	Notes
Timiskaming	Unorganized West Timiskaming District	0.0	0.0	Highway 66 – Matachewan, Kirkland Lake	
Timiskaming	Elk Lake	32.9	20.4	Highway 560 west (Gowganda Road) – Gowganda, Shining Tree	Beginning of Highway 560 concurrency
Timiskaming	Elk Lake	33.9	21.1	Highway 560 east (Rosedale Avenue) – Charlton	End of Highway 560 concurrency
Timiskaming	McCool	71.3	44.3	Highway 562 north – Thornloe	
Timiskaming	New Liskeard	97.9	60.8	Highway 11 south / TCH – North Bay	Beginning of unsigned concurrency with Highway 11
Timiskaming	New Liskeard	100.6	62.5	Highway 11 north / TCH – Cochrane	End of unsigned concurrency with Highway 11
Timiskaming	New Liskeard	101.4	63.0	Armstrong Street	Former Highway 11B
Timiskaming	Casey Township	118.5	73.6	Casey Mine Road (south) / Development Road (north)	
Timiskaming	Casey Township	123.3	76.6	Ontario–Quebec border	
Abitibi-Témiscamingue (Quebec)	Notre-Dame-du-Nord	125.9	78.2	R-101 – Rouyn-Noranda, Ville-Marie	
1.000 mi = 1.609 km; 1.000 km = 0.621 mi: Concurrency terminus
