= Notre-Dame-du-Nord =

- Municipality
- Notre-Dame-du-Nord in 2026

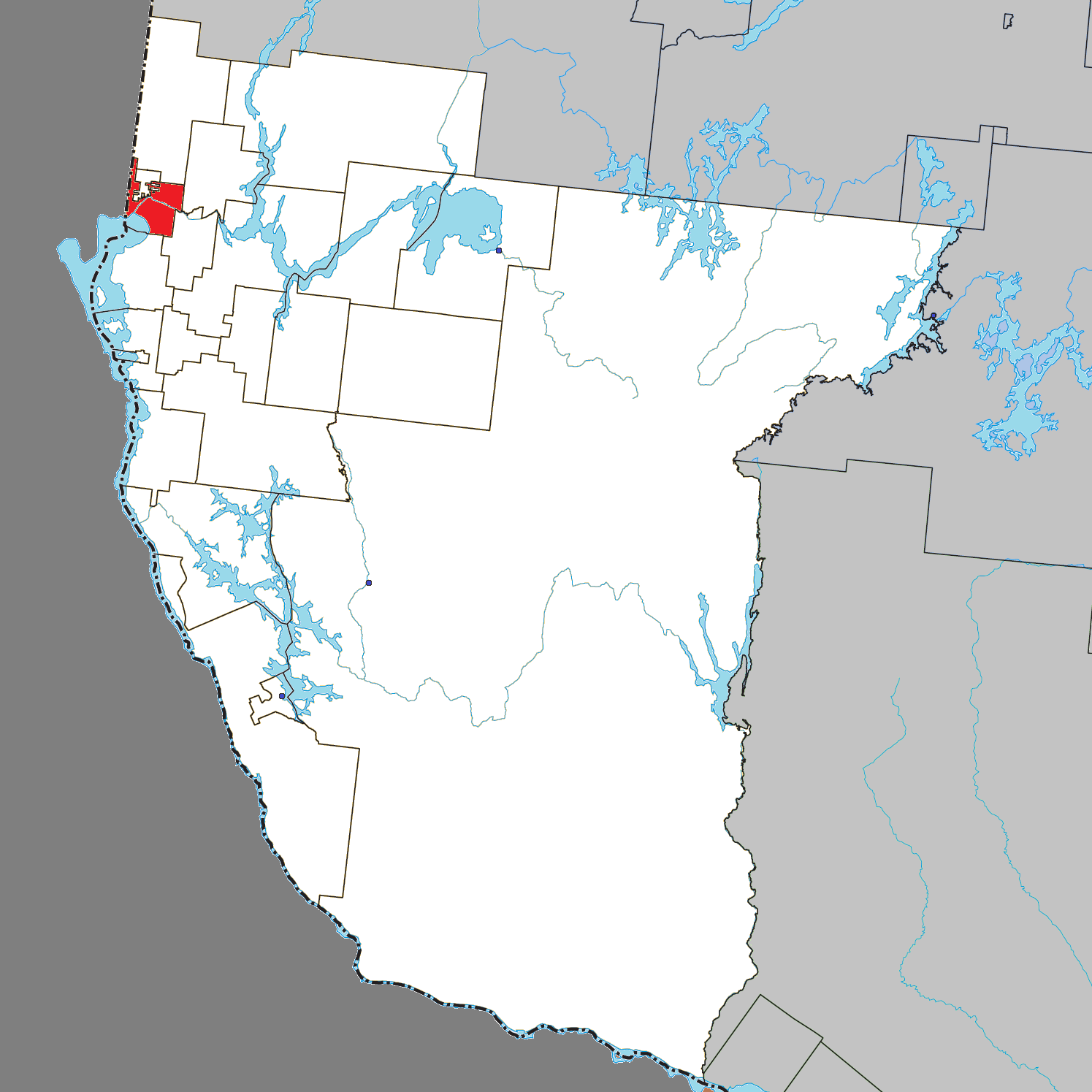
- Location within Témiscamingue RCM

- Location in western Quebec
- Coordinates: 47°36′N 79°29′W
- Country: Canada
- Province: Quebec
- Region: Abitibi-Témiscamingue
- RCM: Témiscamingue
- Settled: 1896
- Constituted: September 23, 1919

Government
  - Mayor: Nico Gervais
  - Federal riding: Abitibi—Témiscamingue
  - Prov. riding: Rouyn-Noranda–Témiscamingue

Area
  - Total: 89.92 km^{2} (34.72 sq mi)
  - Land: 74.34 km^{2} (28.70 sq mi)

Population (2021)
  - Total: 1,090
  - Density: 14.7/km^{2} (38/sq mi)
  - Pop (2016–21): ▲3.6%
  - Dwellings: 569
- Time zone: UTC−05:00 (EST)
  - Summer (DST): UTC−04:00 (EDT)
- Postal code(s): J0Z 3B0
- Area code: 819
- Highways: R-101
- Website: nddn.ca

Notre-Dame-du-Nord (French pronunciation: [nɔtʁə dam dy nɔʁ]) is a municipality in the Canadian province of Quebec, located in the Témiscamingue Regional County Municipality. It is located at the northern end of Lake Timiskaming where the Ottawa River enters into this lake.

The municipality is located along Route 101. A local street, rue Ontario, extends westward from Route 101 to the Quebec-Ontario border, where it becomes Ontario Highway 65. In Ontario, the highway passes through the townships of Casey and Harris en route to the city of Temiskaming Shores.

Notre-Dame-du-Nord is best known as the home of an annual truck drag race event called Rodéo du Camion (Truck Rodeo) which is held over the August Civic Holiday of each year, which brings over 650 trucks and 60,000 spectators to the town each year.

Local attractions also include the Lake Timiskaming Fossil Centre, a museum and research institution dedicated to the fossils of the Témiscamingue region, and the Heath Racing motocross track.

== History ==
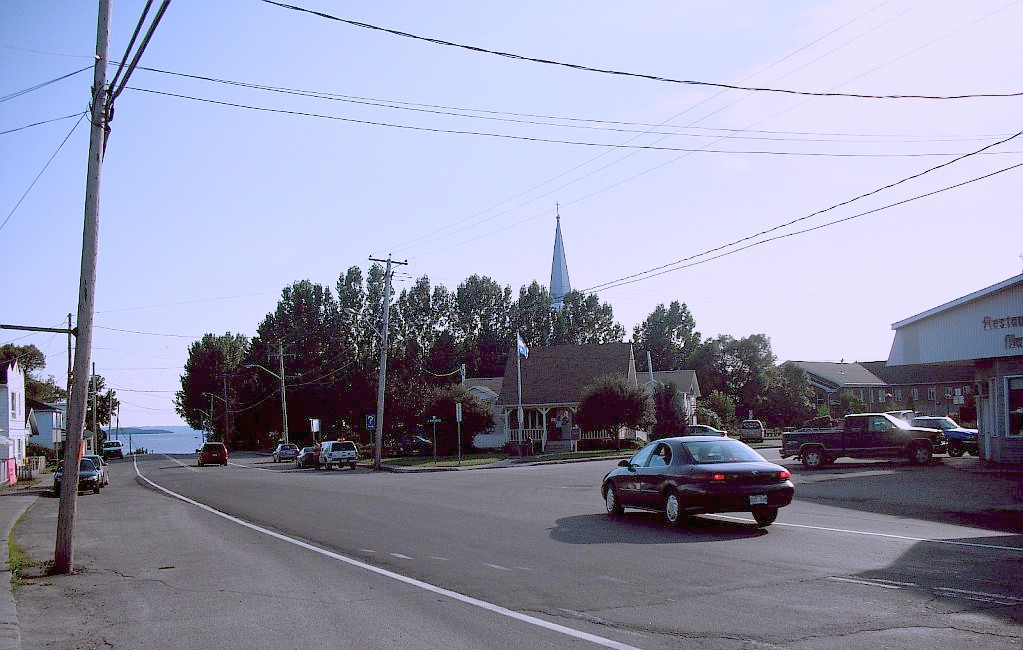
Intersection of Route 101 and Rue Ontario, with Lake Timiskaming in the background

The area had been known by a variety of names: Tête-du-Lac ("Head-of-the-Lake" in reference to its position at the head of Lake Timiskaming), Pointe à Polson in 1858 (after a First Nations family living there at the time), Murray City in 1862 (in honour of Thomas Murray of Pembroke whose company was logging there), and North Temiscaming at the end of 19th century.

In 1895, the mission located on the north bank of the Rapids des Quinze became a parish under the name of Notre-Dame-du-Nord. In 1919, the place was incorporated as the Township Municipality of Nedelec-Partie-Sud. It was partially destroyed in the Great Fire of 1922. In 1928, it was renamed after the parish.

In 1951, the Municipality of Notre-Dame-des-Quinze, which had developed concurrently on the other side of the rapids, was merged into Notre-Dame-du-Nord.

== Demographics ==
In the 2021 Census of Population conducted by Statistics Canada, Notre-Dame-du-Nord had a population of 1,090 living in 511 of its 569 total private dwellings, a change of 3.6% from its 2016 population of 1,052. With a land area of 74.34 km^{2} (28.70 sq mi), it had a population density of 14.7/km^{2} (38.0/sq mi) in 2021.

Canada census – Notre-Dame-du-Nord community profile

	2021	2016	2011
Population	1,090 (+3.6% from 2016)	1,052 (-2.1% from 2011)	1,075 (-3.7% from 2006)
Land area	74.34 km^{2} (28.70 sq mi)	74.76 km^{2} (28.86 sq mi)	74.99 km^{2} (28.95 sq mi)
Population density	14.7/km^{2} (38/sq mi)	14.1/km^{2} (37/sq mi)	14.3/km^{2} (37/sq mi)
Median age	54.4 (M: 53.2, F: 55.6)	49.9 (M: 50.0, F: 49.9)	48.5 (M: 48.0, F: 49.0)
Private dwellings	569 (total) 511 (occupied)	536 (total) 490 (occupied)	534 (total) 514 (occupied)
Median household income	$58,000	$47,360	$49,260

References: 2021 2016 2011

Historical census populations – Notre-Dame-du-Nord

Year	Pop.	±%
1921	464	—
1931	443	−4.5%
1941	422	−4.7%
1951	589	+39.6%
1956	1,146	+94.6%
1961	1,154	+0.7%

Year	Pop.	±%
1966	1,182	+2.4%
1971	1,250	+5.8%
1976	1,260	+0.8%
1981	1,311	+4.0%
1986	1,284	−2.1%
1991	1,245	−3.0%

Year	Pop.	±%
1996	1,250	+0.4%
2001	1,109	−11.3%
2006	1,116	+0.6%
2011	1,075	−3.7%
2016	1,052	−2.1%
2021	1,090	+3.6%

Population counts are not adjusted for boundary changes.
Source: Statistics Canada

Mother tongue (2021):

- English as first language: 14.2%
- French as first language: 80.9%
- English and French as first language: 2.9%
- Other as first language: 2.5%

== Government ==
List of former mayors:

- Fidèle Baril (...–2005)
- Mychel Tremblay (2009–2013)
- Alain Flageol (2013–2017)
- Nico Gervais (2017–present)

== See also ==
- List of anglophone communities in Quebec
- List of municipalities in Quebec
