= Tomstown, Ontario =

Community in Ontario, Canada

Coordinates: 47°47′50″N 79°45′00″W

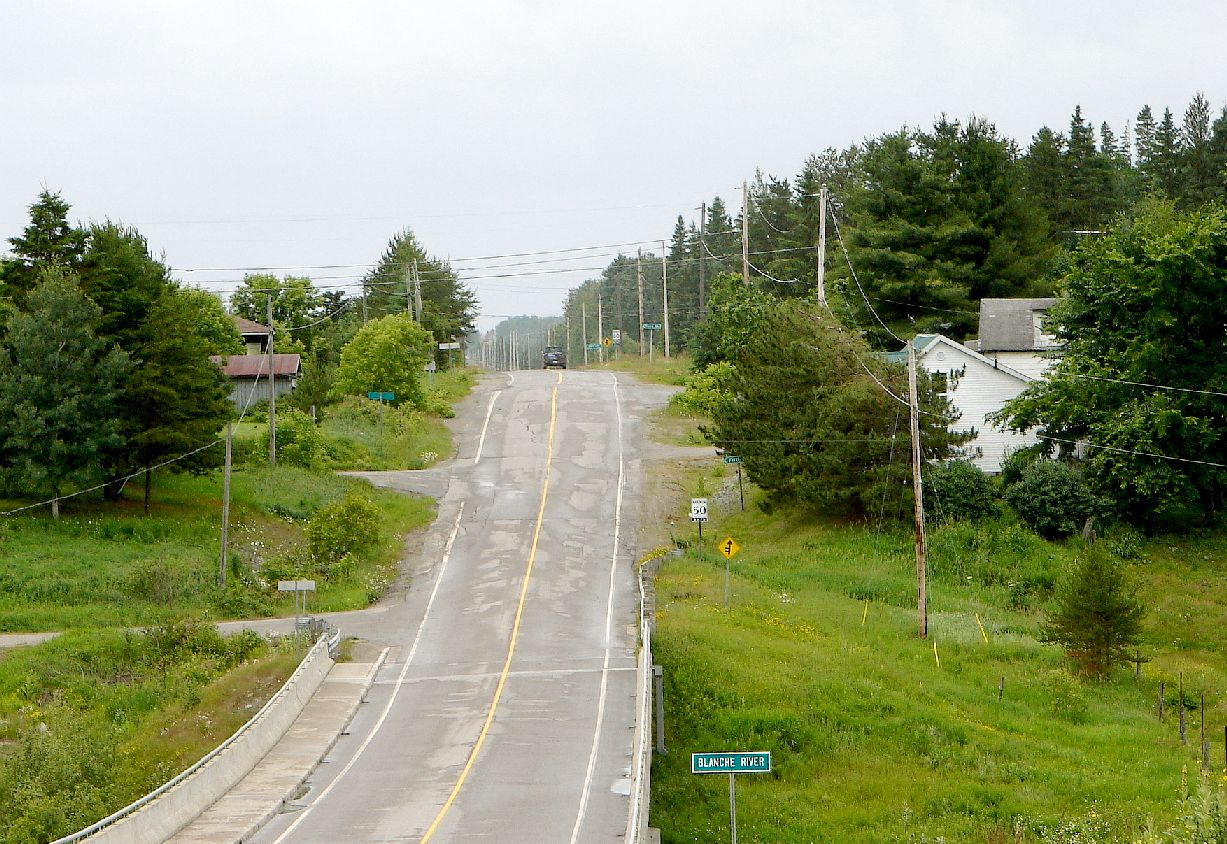
Tomstown

Tomstown is an unincorporated community in the Canadian province of Ontario, located in the unincorporated township of Ingram within the Unorganized, West Part, division of Timiskaming District.

The community is located on Secondary Highway 569, a few kilometres east of Heaslip, Ontario.

== Naming ==
The town was named after Ulysses Henry Thomas when the town's post office opened in 1903. Previously, the place had been known colloquially as Uncle Thomas Town.

== History ==
=== Early history ===
The first people to live in the Lake Temiskaming area were Algonquins who used the area for trapping, hunting and fishing. They inhabited the lands along the Lake Temiskaming-Ottawa River waterway, Lake Kippawa, North Temiskaming, Blanche and Wabi Rivers.

=== European settlement ===
During the late-19th century, the provincial government had become interested in the economic potential of "new" or northern Ontario. The government organized surveying parties to travel through northern Ontario identifying natural resources and mapping the region. In 1874, the Ontario-Quebec boundary was surveyed and the land above Lake Temiskaming, including the northern townships, was mapped by Dr. Robert Bell and his assistant Arthur Barlow in 1887. In 1899, Barlow wrote a report on the geology and natural resources of the area, which suggested that the rich belt of clay that lay north of the big lake was ideal for agricultural settlement.

From 1897 to 1901 80,000 acres of land had been sold in the Temiskaming area. The government put restrictions on the sale of each piece of property to prevent speculators from buying up all of the land. Property owners were required to clear at least 15 acres (61,000 m2) of land, build a 16x20ft house, and spend a certain amount of time on the property. Veterans of the Fenian Raids and the Boer War were given free land.

Initial settlers to the Township of Ingram, Ontario and 'Uncle Thomas Town' were from the Counties of Simcoe, Oxford and North Glengary who decided to settle north of Thornloe because much of the good land close to the town had already been taken up. They were followed by settlers from Renfrew and the Southern Counties of Leeds, Cumberland, Frontenac and Lennox & Addington, many of whom where descendants of United Empire Loyalists United Empire Loyalist

Paddle wheel boats operated by Oliver Latour in the early 1880s, from the most southern tip of Lake Temiskaming, at Mattawa traveling as far north as 'Uncle Tom's Town' on the Blanche River delivering settlers, livestock and supplies. One of the early roads in the area was built in 1904 connecting Charlton and Dack, Ontario to Tomstown to improve the flow of goods and people. With the coming of rail to Englehart in 1908, the Temiskaming and Northern Ontario Railway ended the steamer service, and Tomstown's commercial and logistical importance declined.

=== Timber industry ===
The settlers worked their farms during the spring, summer and fall and during the winter many worked for large lumbering companies such as J.R. Booth. Logs were hewed and transported by teams of horses onto the frozen ice of the Blanche River below the rapids at 'Uncle Thomas Town' during freeze up when the steamers could not operate. With the spring thaw these timber rafts were floated downriver to the mills at New Liskeard. This cheap means to transport timber was continued until the late 1960s when halted for environmental concerns.
