= Kenabeek =

- Locality
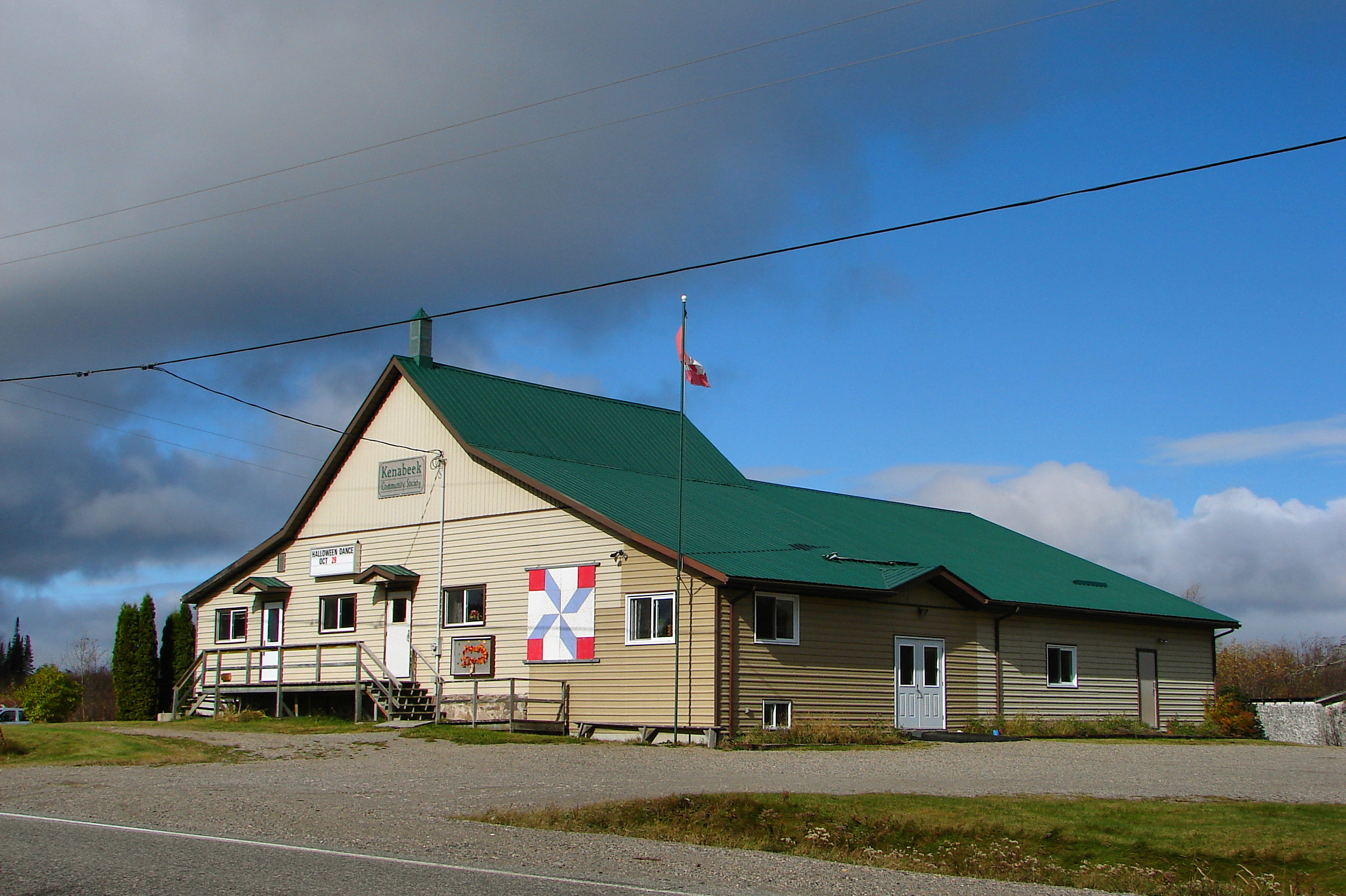
- Kenabeek community centre

- Location in Ontario
- Coordinates: 47°38′22″N 79°59′44″W
- Country: Canada
- Province: Ontario
- District: Timiskaming
- Geographic township: Henwood
- Elevation: 286 m (938 ft)
- Time zone: UTC-5 (Eastern Time Zone)
  - Summer (DST): UTC-4 (Eastern Time Zone)
- Postal Code: P0J 1M0
- Area codes: 705, 249

Kenabeek (/ˈkɛnəˌbɛk/ KEN-ə-bek) is a locality and unincorporated community in geographic Henwood Township in the Unorganized West Part of Timiskaming District, in northeastern Ontario, Canada. The community is located on Ontario Highway 65, approximately halfway between Elk Lake and New Liskeard.

== Geography ==
Kenabeek and its surrounding area is mostly sand with a bit of rock, and a shallow amount of topsoil, and therefore is not good agricultural land. There are a number of small lakes within two or three miles (5 km) of Kenabeek, mostly privately owned. Many are muskeg lakes and others are surrounded by swamp. Several of the lakes are home to loons. Land in the Kenabeek area is mostly used for growing hay and potatoes, and in a few cases for grazing a small number of cattle for local use.

== History ==
Kenabeek was founded at some time in the early 1920s as a post office, since the nearest post office at the time was in Thornloe, about 15 miles (24 km) away, a long distance by horse and wagon. Other than farms (160 acre plots, a few with multiple homes, usually multi-generation family) there are no houses falling within the village, so the town is considered to be the Post Office and Community Centre.

Kenabeek and the surrounding area was hit by the Great Fire of 1922 (the Haileybury fire of 1922) which wiped out hundreds of acres of land and many homes in and around Kenabeek.

Most of the residents of the Kenabeek area can trace their families back two and three generations.

== Boundaries and residents ==
The Kenabeek town signs are placed about 2.5 miles (4.0 km) from the Post Office, but the surrounding homes are mostly on the original 160-acre (0.65 km^{2}) farm plots, except for a few homes carved out of those plots for extended family or friends, and are not town-homes.

In addition to the Post Office, there is a community centre. The community centre is the original one-room schoolhouse which housed grades 1 to 8 until sometime in the 1960s. The current caretaker of the Community Centre is Jean Byerlay.
