= Savard, Ontario =

Geographic township in Ontario, Canada

Coordinates: 47°53′05″N 80°04′54″W

Savard is a geographic township in the Canadian province of Ontario, located in the Timiskaming District. It is located immediately west of the municipality of Chamberlain.

A designated place served by a local services board, Savard had a population of 223 in the Canada 2006 Census.

== Demographics ==
In the 2021 Census of Population conducted by Statistics Canada, Savard had a population of 244 living in 92 of its 125 total private dwellings, a change of -13.5% from its 2016 population of 282. With a land area of 201.55 km^{2} (77.82 sq mi), it had a population density of 1.2/km^{2} (3.1/sq mi) in 2021.
