= List of francophone communities in Ontario =

This is a list of francophone communities in Ontario. Municipalities with a high percentage of French-speakers in the Canadian province of Ontario are listed.

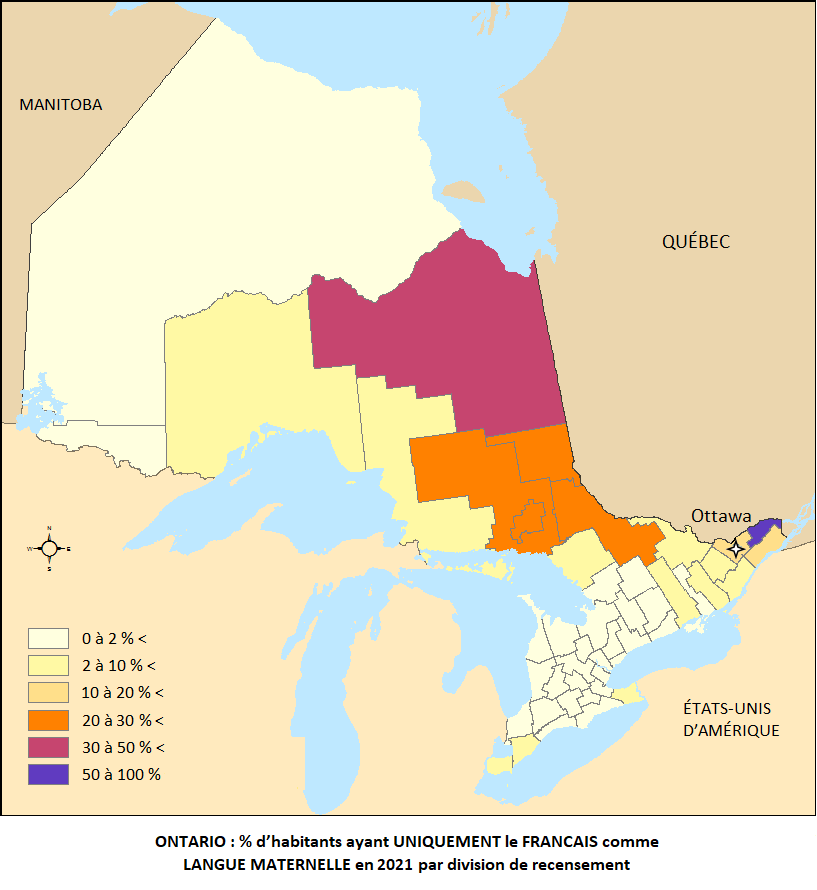
Proportion of Ontarians who declared French as their only mother tongue in the 2021 Canadian census, by census division.

The provincial average of Ontarians whose mother tongue is French is 3.3%, with a total of 463,120 people in Ontario who identify French as their mother tongue in 2021. The majority of Franco-Ontarians in Ontario live in eastern and northeastern Ontario. While most communities in these areas have sizeable French minorities, several municipalities have francophone majorities.

Most such places are designated as French language service areas under the provincial French Language Services Act, meaning that Government of Ontario services must be available in French.

Municipality	Type	County, district, or regional municipality	Total pop.	%Francophone	# of Francophones
Alfred and Plantagenet	Township	Prescott and Russell	9,949	71%	7064
Armstrong	Township	Timiskaming	1,199	52%	623
Beckwith	Township	Lanark	9,021	5%	451
Black River-Matheson	Township	Cochrane	2,572	23%	592
Blind River	Town	Algoma	3,422	14%	479
Bonfield	Township	Nipissing	2,146	20%	429
Callander	Municipality	Parry Sound	3,964	9%	357
Carleton Place	Town	Lanark	12,517	5%	626
Casselman	Village	Prescott and Russell	3,960	71%	2812
Central Manitoulin	Municipality	Manitoulin	2,235	4%	89
Champlain	Township	Prescott and Russell	8,665	59%	5112
Clarence-Rockland	City	Prescott and Russell	26,505	57%	15108
Chapleau	Township	Sudbury	1,942	33%	641
Chisholm	Township	Nipissing	1,312	10%	131
Cochrane	Town	Cochrane	5,390	33%	1779
Cornwall	City	Stormont, Dundas and Glengarry	47,845	19%	9091
Deep River	Town	Renfrew	4,175	5%	209
East Ferris	Municipality	Nipissing	4,946	19%	940
East Hawkesbury	Township	Prescott and Russell	3,418	58%	1982
Elliot Lake	City	Algoma	11,372	12%	1365
Englehart	Town	Timiskaming	1,442	7%	101
Espanola	Town	Sudbury	5,185	12%	622
French River	Municipality	Sudbury	2,828	39%	1103
Greater Sudbury	City	Single-tier municipality	166,004	23%	38181
Greenstone	Municipality	Thunder Bay	4,309	21%	905
Hawkesbury	Town	Prescott and Russell	10,194	72%	7340
Hearst	Town	Cochrane	4,794	84%	4027
Francophone majority Summation			107,031	63%	67,238
Huron Shores	Municipality	Algoma	1,860	5%	93
Ignace	Township	Kenora	1,206	7%	84
Iroquois Falls	Town	Cochrane	4,418	33%	1458
Kapuskasing	Town	Cochrane	8,057	63%	5076
Kirkland Lake	Town	Timiskaming	7,750	12%	930
Lakeshore	Town	Essex	40,410	5%	2021
Laurentian Hills	Town	Renfrew	2,885	6%	173
Laurentian Valley	Township	Renfrew	9,450	5%	473
Manitouwadge	Township	Thunder Bay	1,974	12%	237
Marathon	Town	Thunder Bay	3,138	9%	282
Markstay-Warren	Municipality	Sudbury	2,708	30%	812
Mattawa	Town	Nipissing	1,881	25%	470
Merrickville–Wolford	Village	Leeds and Grenville	3,135	6%	188
Moonbeam	Township	Cochrane	1,157	71%	821
Nipissing	Indian reserve	Nipissing	1,640	14%	230
North Bay	City	Nipissing	52,662	11%	5793
North Dundas	Township	Stormont, Dundas and Glengarry	11,304	8%	904
North Glengarry	Township	Stormont, Dundas and Glengarry	10,144	35%	3550
North Grenville	Municipality	Leeds and Grenville	17,964	6%	1078
North Stormont	Township	Stormont, Dundas and Glengarry	7,400	26%	1924
Northeastern Manitoulin and the Islands	Town	Manitoulin	2,641	5%	132
Ottawa	City	Single-tier municipality	1,017,449	13%	132268
Pembroke	City	Single-tier municipality	14,364	6%	862
Penetanguishene	Town	Simcoe	10,077	8%	806
Petawawa	Town	Renfrew	18,160	10%	1816
Russell	Township	Prescott and Russell	19,598	38%	7447
Sables-Spanish Rivers	Township	Sudbury	3,237	9%	291
St. Charles	Municipality	Sudbury	1,357	41%	556
Smooth Rock Falls	Town	Cochrane	1,200	58%	696
South Glengarry	Township	Stormont, Dundas and Glengarry	13,330	25%	3333
South Stormont	Township	Stormont, Dundas and Glengarry	13,570	14%	1900
Temiskaming Shores	City	Timiskaming	9,634	28%	2698
Terrace Bay	Township	Thunder Bay	1,528	4%	61
The Nation	Municipality	Prescott and Russell	13,350	63%	8411
Timmins	City	Cochrane	41,145	33%	13578
Tiny	Township	Simcoe	12,966	7%	908
Wawa	Municipality	Algoma	2,705	17%	460
Welland	City	Niagara	55,750	7%	3903
West Nipissing	Municipality	Nipissing	14,583	56%	8166

A number of small municipalities also have high francophone populations. These include the francophone-majority municipalities of Dubreuilville (79%), Fauquier-Strickland (68%), Mattice-Val Côté (82%), Opasatika (63%), and Val Rita-Harty (71%).

Small francophone-minority municipalities include Baldwin (11%), Billings (10%), Brethour (10%), Calvin (10%), Casey (42%), Chamberlain (6%), Chapleau Cree Fox Lake (8%), Charlton and Dack (5%), Cobalt (13%), Coleman (25%), Dokis (10%), Dorion (5%), Evanturel (9%), Gauthier (17%), Harley (28%), Harris (30%), Head, Clara and Maria (6%), Hornepayne (10%), Hilliard (21%), Hudson (18%), James (19%), Jocelyn (7%), Kerns (11%), Larder Lake (19%), Latchford (11%), Matachewan (17%), Matachewan (15%), Mattagami (5%), Mattawan (26%), McGarry (38%), Nairn and Hyman (9%), Temagami (13%), The North Shore (15%), Papineau-Cameron (22%), Spanish (18%), Thornloe (28%), and White River (13%).

== See also ==
- Geographical distribution of French speakers
- List of townships in Ontario
- Francophone Association of Municipalities of Ontario
