= King-Lebel =

- designated place
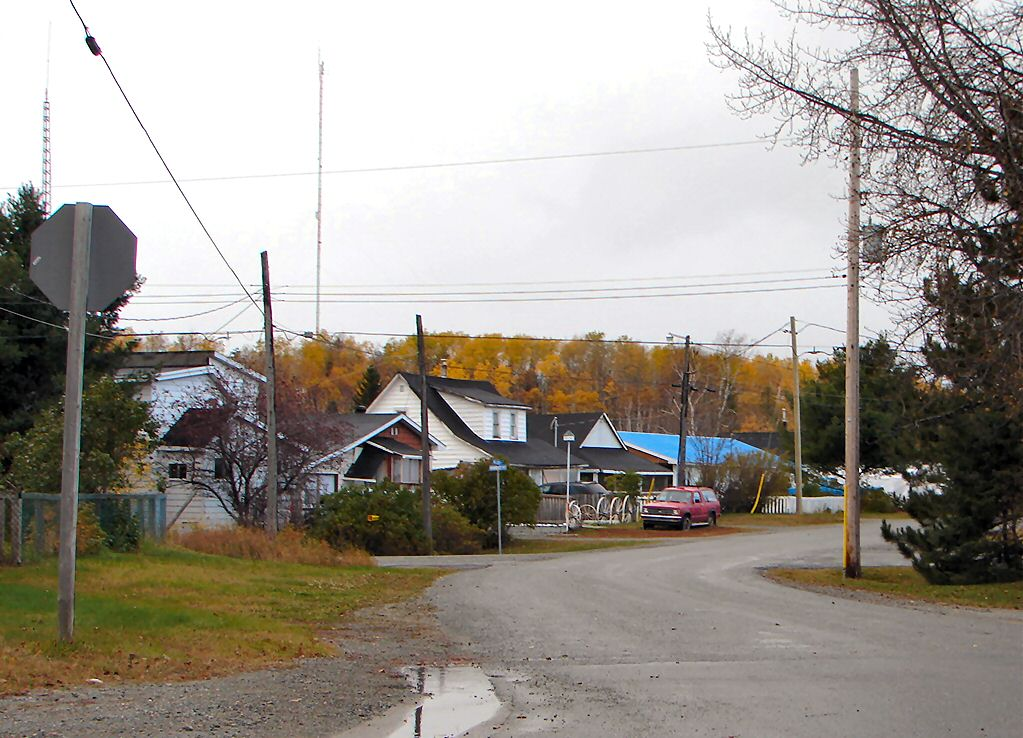
- King Kirkland
- Interactive map of King-Lebel
- Coordinates: 48°09′45″N 79°57′30″W
- Country: Canada
- Province: Ontario
- District: Timiskaming District

Government
  - Type: local services board
  - MP: Gaétan Malette
  - MPP: John Vanthof

Area
  - Total: 83.92 km^{2} (32.40 sq mi)

Population (2016)
  - Total: 379
  - Density: 4.52/km^{2} (11.7/sq mi)
- Canada 2016 Census
- Time zone: UTC-5 (Eastern (EST))
- Area code: 705

King-Lebel is a designated place in the Canadian province of Ontario, located in the Timiskaming District. The community, located between the town of Kirkland Lake and the municipal township of Gauthier, consists of the unincorporated township of Lebel, whose primary settlement is the community of King Kirkland.

Services in the township are provided by a local services board.

The community is considered part of Timiskaming, Unorganized, West Part.

== Demographics ==
Historical population
Year	Pop.	±%
2006	351	—
2011	322	−8.3%
2016	376	+16.8%

In the 2021 Census of Population conducted by Statistics Canada, King-Lebel had a population of 354 living in 146 of its 165 total private dwellings, a change of −6.6% from its 2016 population of 379. With a land area of 83.76 km^{2} (32.34 sq mi), it had a population density of 4.2/km^{2} (10.9/sq mi) in 2021.
