= Hudson, Ontario =

Hudson
- Township (single-tier)
- Township of Hudson
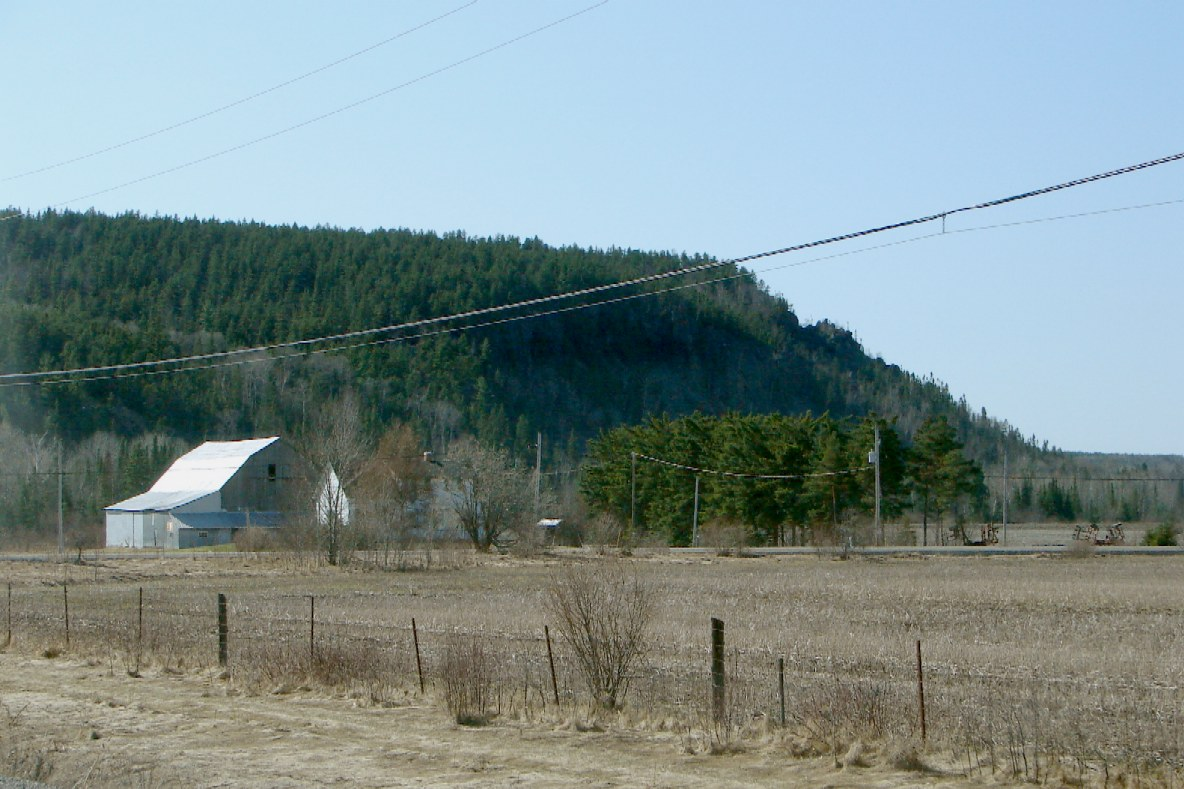

- Location within Ontario
- Coordinates: 47°32′14″N 79°49′27″W
- Country: Canada
- Province: Ontario
- District: Timiskaming
- Surveyed: 1887
- First settled: 1897
- Incorporated: 1904

Government
  - Reeve: Larry Craig

Area
  - Total: 90.28 km^{2} (34.86 sq mi)
- Elevation: 245 m (804 ft)

Population (2021)
  - Total: 530
  - Density: 5.9/km^{2} (15/sq mi)
- Time zone: UTC-5 (EST)
  - Summer (DST): UTC-4 (EDT)
- Postal code FSA: P0J
- Area codes: 705, 249
- Website: hudson.ca

Hudson is a township municipality incorporating the congruent geographic township in Timiskaming District in northeastern Ontario, Canada. Hudson is located directly west of the city of Temiskaming Shores and has only one named settlement, the community of Hillview (47°32′13″N 79°46′54″W).

== History ==
Hudson was surveyed in 1887. However, the first settlers did not arrive until 1897, and the township was incorporated in 1904. The first Census of Canada to take place after settlement, in 1901, recorded the population as 46.

== Geography ==
Hudson is mostly surrounded by forest with some farming along the east and north areas of the township.

The township is delimited by:

- Pipeline Road to the east
- Hudson Concession 1 and allowance east of Hillview Road
- Eastern boundary of Unorganized West Timiskaming District
- Uno Park Road to the north

== Demographics ==
In the 2021 Census of Population conducted by Statistics Canada, Hudson had a population of 530 living in 213 of its 325 total private dwellings, a change of 5.4% from its 2016 population of 503. With a land area of 90.28 km^{2} (34.86 sq mi), it had a population density of 5.9/km^{2} (15.2/sq mi) in 2021.

Canada census – Hudson community profile

	2021	2016	2011
Population	530 (+5.4% from 2016)	503 (5.7% from 2011)	476 (4.6% from 2006)
Land area	90.28 km^{2} (34.86 sq mi)	90.37 km^{2} (34.89 sq mi)	90.64 km^{2} (35.00 sq mi)
Population density	5.9/km^{2} (15/sq mi)	5.6/km^{2} (15/sq mi)	5.3/km^{2} (14/sq mi)
Median age	46.8 (M: 47.2, F: 46.8)	50.0 (M: 50.7, F: 48.7)	48.7 (M: 50.1, F: 47.8)
Private dwellings	325 (total) 213 (occupied)	280 (total)	336 (total)
Median household income	$96,000	$86,144

References: 2021 2016 2011

Historical census populations – Hudson, Ontario

Year	Pop.	±%
1901	46	—
1911	310	+573.9%
1921	357	+15.2%
1931	345	−3.4%
1941	335	−2.9%
1951	389	+16.1%
1956	381	−2.1%

Year	Pop.	±%
1961	379	−0.5%
1966	402	+6.1%
1971	436	+8.5%
1976	437	+0.2%
1981	450	+3.0%
1986	472	+4.9%
1991	488	+3.4%

Year	Pop.	±%
1996	501	+2.7%
2001	490	−2.2%
2006	455	−7.1%
2011	476	+4.6%
2016	503	+5.7%
2021	530	+5.4%

Source: Statistics Canada

== Government ==
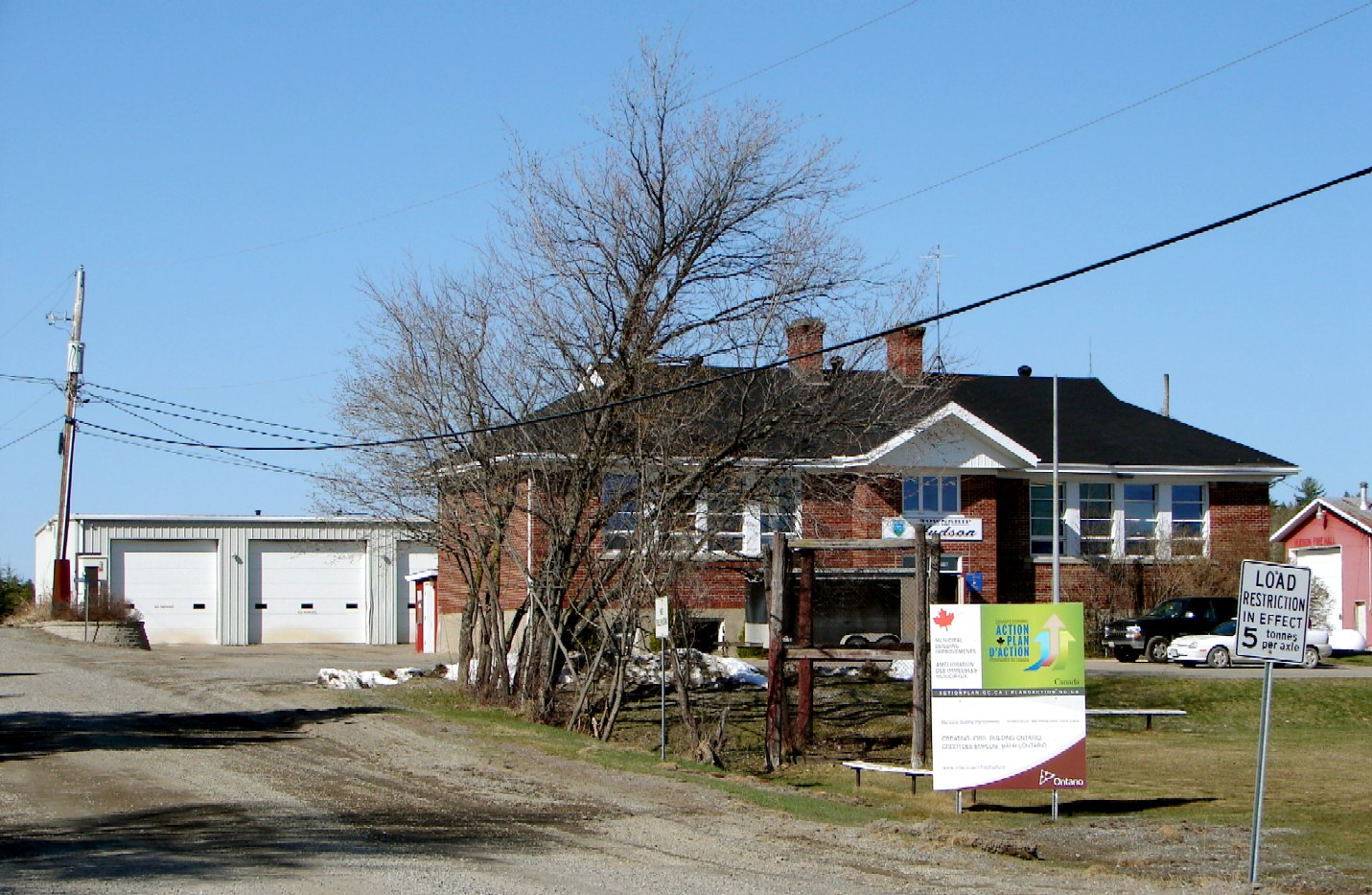
Township hall

The township is headed by a mayor and four councillors.

== Infrastructure ==
The township has its own volunteer fire department, library at the Township Offices and a single municipal park with playground at Pike Lake Park. All other services are found in nearby New Liskeard including hospital and schools.

=== Transportation ===
Ontario Highway 65 passes through the township on its way from Temiskaming Shores towards Matachewan.

== See also ==
- List of townships in Ontario
- List of francophone communities in Ontario
