= Harley, Ontario =

Harley
- Township (single-tier)
- Township of Harley
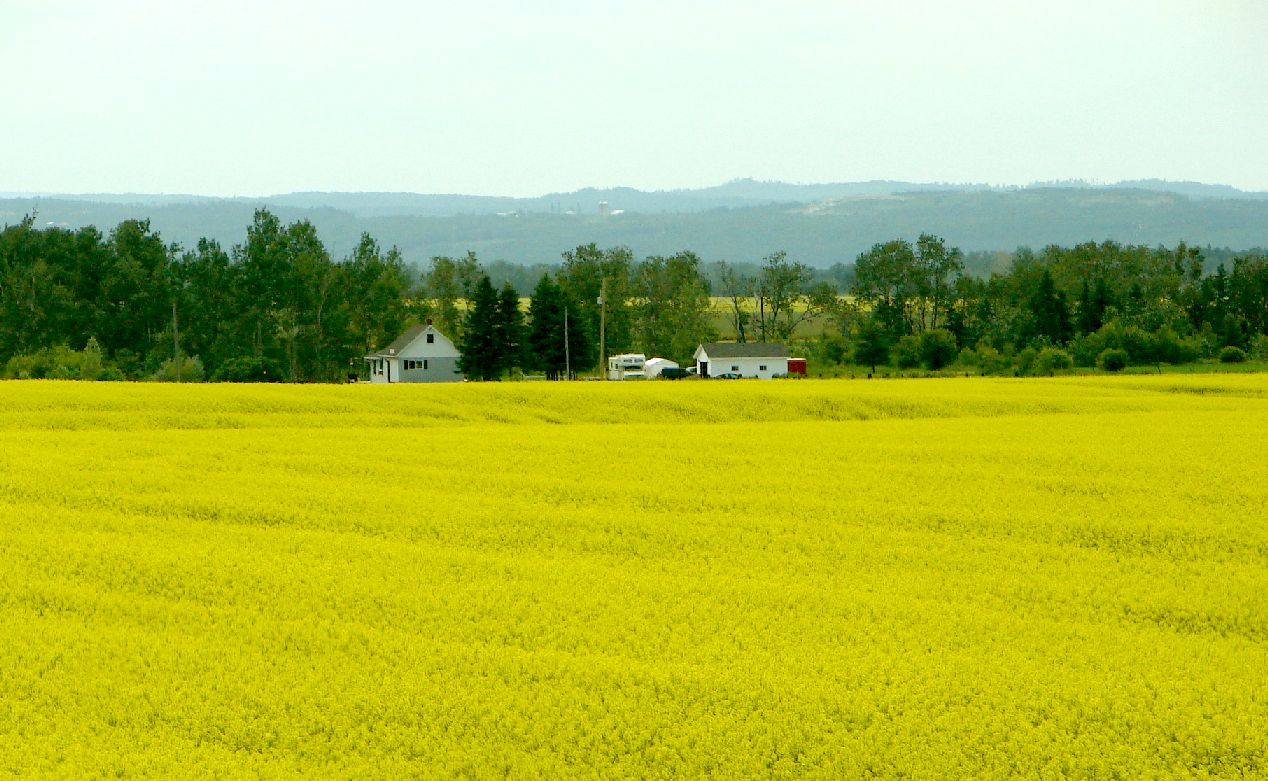

- Location within Ontario
- Coordinates: 47°37′N 79°42′W
- Country: Canada
- Province: Ontario
- District: Timiskaming
- Established: 1896
- Incorporated: 1904

Government
  - Type: Township
  - Reeve: Pauline Archambault
  - Fed. riding: Nipissing—Timiskaming
  - Prov. riding: Timiskaming—Cochrane

Area
  - Land: 92.34 km^{2} (35.65 sq mi)

Population (2021)
  - Total: 524
  - Density: 5.7/km^{2} (15/sq mi)
- Time zone: UTC−5 (EST)
  - Summer (DST): UTC−4 (EDT)
- Postal Code: P0J 1P0
- Area codes: 705, 249
- Website: harley.ca

Harley is a township in the Canadian province of Ontario. Located within the Timiskaming District, Harley is located directly north of the city of Temiskaming Shores.

It is believed to be named in honour of Archibald Harley, former Member of Parliament for Oxford South.

== Communities ==
The township's main settlement is the community of Hanbury. The ghost town of Uno Park is also located within the township.

== History ==
In 1896, the township was opened up for settlement. Settlers arrived first by boat on the Wabi Creek and later on via the North Dymond and Harley Road (since 1937 known as Highway 11). It was incorporated in 1904.

Initially the land was covered with spruce, tamarack, cedar, and poplar, that supported a thriving lumber industry. Having been cleared of most forests, Harley's main economic activity shifted to agriculture.

== Demographics ==
In the 2021 Census of Population conducted by Statistics Canada, Harley had a population of 524 living in 187 of its 200 total private dwellings, a change of −4.9% from its 2016 population of 551. With a land area of 92.34 km^{2} (35.65 sq mi), it had a population density of 5.7/km^{2} (14.7/sq mi) in 2021.

Canada census – Harley community profile

	2021	2016	2011
Population	524 (-4.9% from 2016)	551 (2.2% from 2011)	539 (-2.2% from 2006)
Land area	92.34 km^{2} (35.65 sq mi)	92.30 km^{2} (35.64 sq mi)	91.73 km^{2} (35.42 sq mi)
Population density	5.7/km^{2} (15/sq mi)	6.0/km^{2} (16/sq mi)	5.9/km^{2} (15/sq mi)
Median age	37.6 (M: 36.4, F: 38.4)	42.2 (M: 40.9, F: 43.0)	42.6 (M: 41.2, F: 43.7)
Private dwellings	200 (total) 187 (occupied)	216 (total)	205 (total)
Median household income	$95,000	$72,448

References: 2021 2016 2011

Historical census populations – Harley, Ontario

Year	Pop.	±%
1901	79	—
1911	445	+463.3%
1921	525	+18.0%
1931	601	+14.5%
1941	588	−2.2%
1951	555	−5.6%
1956	541	−2.5%

Year	Pop.	±%
1961	534	−1.3%
1966	528	−1.1%
1971	582	+10.2%
1976	553	−5.0%
1981	648	+17.2%
1986	596	−8.0%
1991	603	+1.2%

Year	Pop.	±%
1996	608	+0.8%
2001	557	−8.4%
2006	551	−1.1%
2011	539	−2.2%
2016	551	+2.2%
2021	524	−4.9%

Source: Statistics Canada

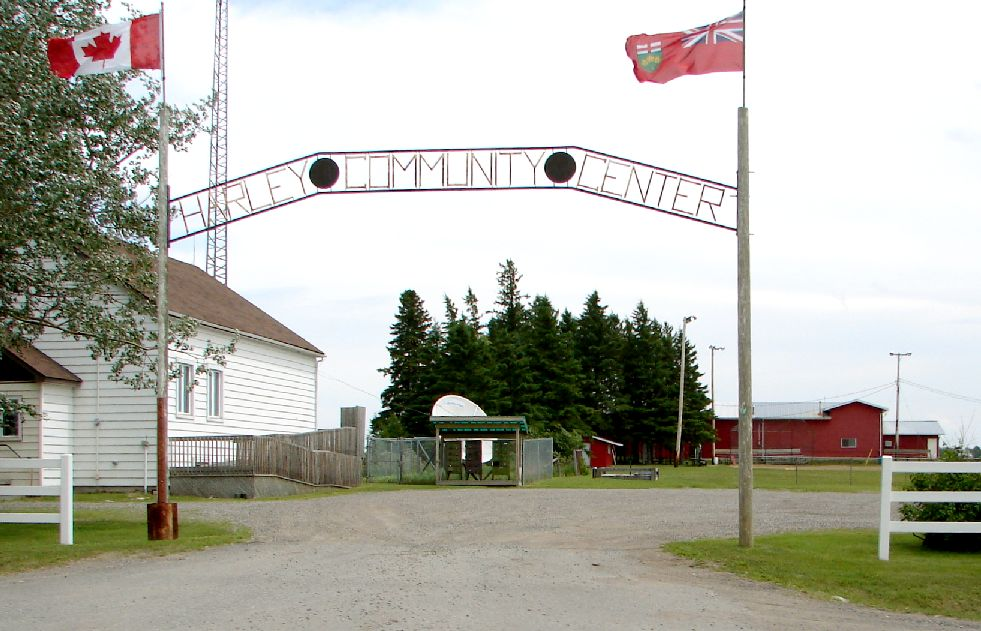
Harley Community Center

Mother tongue (2021):

- English as first language: 61.0%
- French as first language: 27.6%
- English and French as first languages: 4.8%
- Other as first language: 5.7%

== Notable people ==
- Arnold Peters, a Member of Parliament from 1957 to 1980, was born in Uno Park.

== See also ==
- List of townships in Ontario
- List of francophone communities in Ontario
