= Hilliard, Ontario =

Hilliard
- Township (single-tier)
- Township of Hilliard
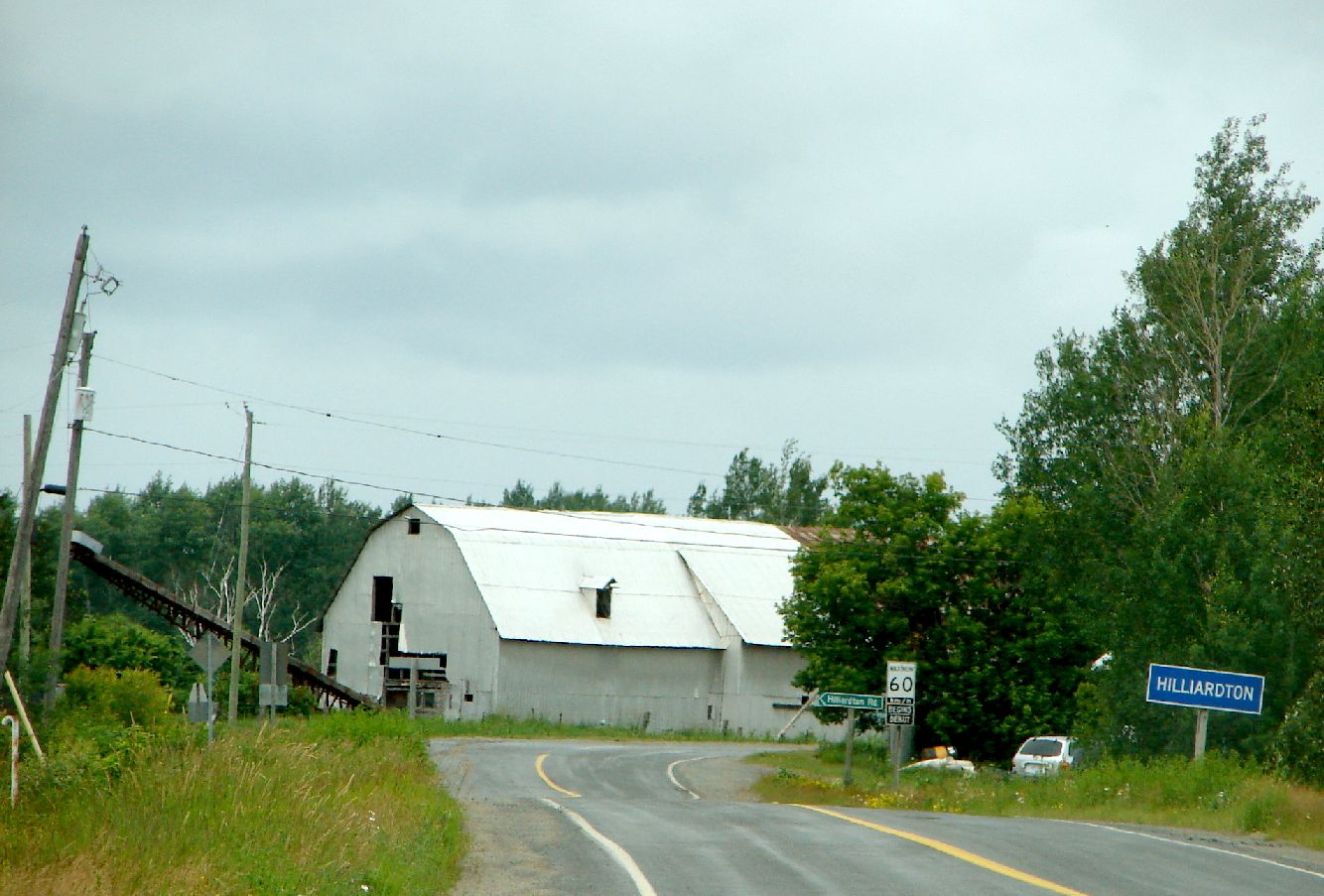
- Hilliardton

- Location within Ontario
- Coordinates: 47°43′30″N 79°42′00″W
- Country: Canada
- Province: Ontario
- District: Timiskaming
- Incorporated: 1910

Government
  - Type: Township
  - Reeve: Laurie Bolesworth
  - Fed. riding: Nipissing—Timiskaming
  - Prov. riding: Timiskaming—Cochrane

Area
  - Land: 91.27 km^{2} (35.24 sq mi)

Population (2021)
  - Total: 215
  - Density: 2.4/km^{2} (6.2/sq mi)
- Time zone: UTC-5 (EST)
  - Summer (DST): UTC-4 (EDT)
- Postal Code: P0J 1S0
- Area codes: 705, 249
- Website: townshipofhilliard.ca

Hilliard is a township in the Canadian province of Ontario, located within the Timiskaming District. Its main community is Hilliardton, located along Secondary Highway 569. The smaller communities of Couttsville and Whitewood Grove are also located within the township.

The township, named in honour of Daniel Hilliard, member of the Legislative Assembly of Ontario from 1886 to 1888, was incorporated in 1910. Its primary economic activity is agriculture.

== Demographics ==
In the 2021 Census of Population conducted by Statistics Canada, Hilliard had a population of 215 living in 87 of its 93 total private dwellings, a change of 3.9% from its 2016 population of 207. With a land area of 91.27 km^{2} (35.24 sq mi), it had a population density of 2.4/km^{2} (6.1/sq mi) in 2021.

Historical census populations – Hilliard, Ontario

Year	Pop.	±%
1901	5	—
1911	310	+6100.0%
1921	400	+29.0%
1931	411	+2.8%
1941	417	+1.5%
1951	380	−8.9%
1956	373	−1.8%

Year	Pop.	±%
1961	398	+6.7%
1966	385	−3.3%
1971	383	−0.5%
1976	321	−16.2%
1981	307	−4.4%
1986	298	−2.9%
1991	248	−16.8%

Year	Pop.	±%
1996	253	+2.0%
2001	241	−4.7%
2006	222	−7.9%
2011	204	−8.1%
2016	207	+1.5%
2021	215	+3.9%

2016 Population figure based on revised count.
Source: Statistics Canada

Mother tongue (2021):

- English as first language: 74.4%
- French as first language: 20.9%
- English and French as first language: 2.3%
- Other as first language: 4.7%

== See also ==
- List of townships in Ontario
- List of francophone communities in Ontario
