= Brethour =

- Township (single-tier)
- Township of Brethour
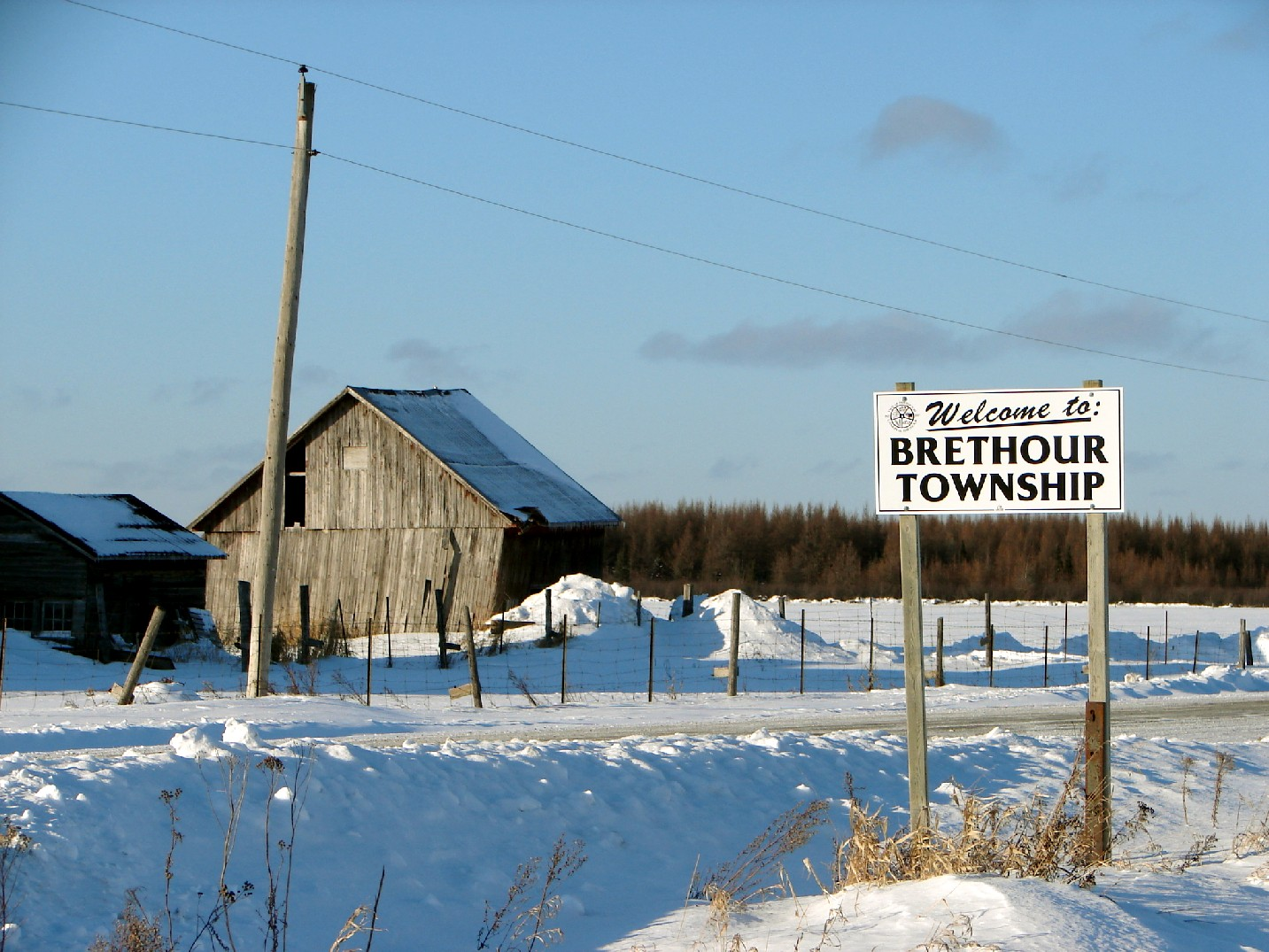

- Location within Ontario
- Coordinates: 47°40′N 79°34′W
- Country: Canada
- Province: Ontario
- District: Timiskaming
- Incorporated: 1917

Government
  - Type: Township
  - Reeve: David Wight
  - Fed. riding: Nipissing—Timiskaming
  - Prov. riding: Timiskaming—Cochrane

Area
  - Land: 81.97 km^{2} (31.65 sq mi)

Population (2021)
  - Total: 105
  - Density: 1.3/km^{2} (3.4/sq mi)
- Time zone: UTC−05:00 (EST)
  - Summer (DST): UTC−04:00 (EDT)
- Area codes: 705, 249

Brethour is a township in the Canadian province of Ontario, located within the Timiskaming District along the Ontario/Quebec provincial border.

The township had a population of 105 in the 2021 Canadian census, making it the second-lowest populated township in the province (after Cockburn Island).

== History ==
Brethour Township was surveyed in 1887. It was then later officially incorporated on October 17, 1917. The township's title was derived from the name of a prominent business man from Brantford, Ontario: H.W. Brethour.

The first people to settle in the area were Edmond and Philomene Robert. Other mentionable early-settler family names include Schmidt, Cooke, Armstrong, Doonan, Broderick, and Goddard; many of which have living descendants still residing within the community. Most notably, Mr. Leonard Broderick continues to own and reside at the farm in which his great-grandfather William Broderick settled in 1903. Although the Brodericks are the only family to have remained on the same original land, many other original settler families have living descendants that have taken up residence on other lots within the township.

== Demographics ==
In the 2021 Census of Population conducted by Statistics Canada, Brethour had a population of 105 living in 38 of its 48 total private dwellings, a change of −15.3% from its 2016 population of 124. With a land area of 81.97 km^{2} (31.65 sq mi), it had a population density of 1.3/km^{2} (3.3/sq mi) in 2021.

Historical census populations – Brethour, Ontario

Year	Pop.	±%
1901	3	—
1911	181	+5933.3%
1921	273	+50.8%
1931	272	−0.4%
1941	302	+11.0%
1951	288	−4.6%
1956	288	+0.0%

Year	Pop.	±%
1961	296	+2.8%
1966	258	−12.8%
1971	202	−21.7%
1976	201	−0.5%
1981	172	−14.4%
1986	148	−14.0%
1991	179	+20.9%

Year	Pop.	±%
1996	181	+1.1%
2001	157	−13.3%
2006	117	−25.5%
2011	129	+10.3%
2016	124	−3.9%
2021	105	−15.3%

2016 Population figure based on revised count.
Source: Statistics Canada

Mother tongue (2021):

- English as first language: 85.7%
- French as first language: 9.5%
- English and French as first languages: 0%
- Other as first language: 4.8%

== See also ==
- List of townships in Ontario
- List of francophone communities in Ontario
