= Kerns, Ontario =

Kerns
- Township (single-tier)
- Township of Kerns
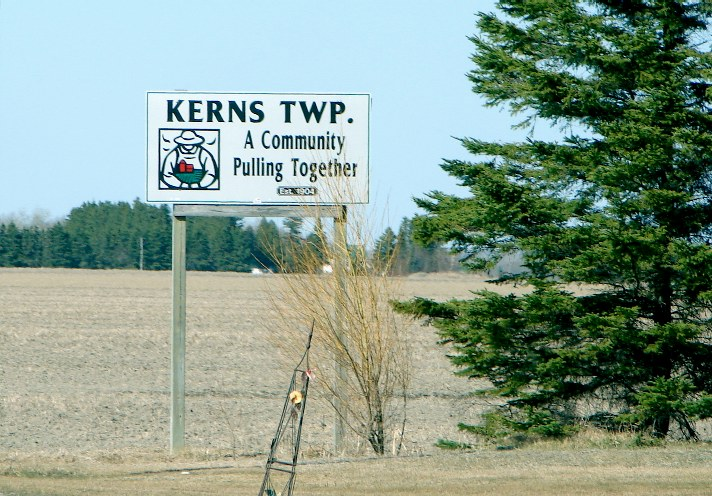
- Kerns township

- Location within Ontario
- Coordinates: 47°36′30″N 79°48′00″W
- Country: Canada
- Province: Ontario
- District: Timiskaming

Government
  - Reeve: Terry Phillips
  - Fed. riding: Nipissing—Timiskaming
  - Prov. riding: Timiskaming—Cochrane

Area
  - Land: 90.66 km^{2} (35.00 sq mi)

Population (2021)
  - Total: 330
  - Density: 3.6/km^{2} (9.3/sq mi)
- Time zone: UTC-5 (EST)
  - Summer (DST): UTC-4 (EDT)
- Postal code: P0J 1P0
- Area code(s): 705
- Website: kerns.ca

Kerns is a township in the Canadian province of Ontario. Located within the Timiskaming District, Kerns is located directly northwest of the city of Temiskaming Shores. Its primary named settlements are the communities of Highland, Milberta, and McCool.

== Demographics ==
In the 2021 Census of Population conducted by Statistics Canada, Kerns had a population of 330 living in 121 of its 129 total private dwellings, a change of −7.8% from its 2016 population of 358. With a land area of 90.66 km^{2} (35.00 sq mi), it had a population density of 3.6/km^{2} (9.4/sq mi) in 2021.

Canada census – Kerns community profile

	2021	2016	2011
Population	330 (-7.8% from 2016)	358 (-0.3% from 2011)	359 (10.5% from 2006)
Land area	90.66 km^{2} (35.00 sq mi)	90.64 km^{2} (35.00 sq mi)	90.44 km^{2} (34.92 sq mi)
Population density	3.6/km^{2} (9.3/sq mi)	3.9/km^{2} (10/sq mi)	4.0/km^{2} (10/sq mi)
Median age	39.2 (M: 41.2, F: 38.4)	39.8 (M: 39.5, F: 40.0)	37.5 (M: 37.4, F: 38.0)
Private dwellings	129 (total) 121 (occupied)	133 (total)	135 (total)
Median household income	$77,000	$63,872	$56,797

References: 2021 2016 2011

Historical census populations – Kerns, Ontario

Year	Pop.	±%
1901	85	—
1911	444	+422.4%
1921	561	+26.4%
1931	547	−2.5%
1941	533	−2.6%
1951	515	−3.4%
1956	521	+1.2%

Year	Pop.	±%
1961	516	−1.0%
1966	469	−9.1%
1971	460	−1.9%
1976	458	−0.4%
1981	458	+0.0%
1986	424	−7.4%
1991	414	−2.4%

Year	Pop.	±%
1996	400	−3.4%
2001	360	−10.0%
2006	325	−9.7%
2011	359	+10.5%
2016	358	−0.3%
2021	330	−7.8%

Source: Statistics Canada

== See also ==
- List of francophone communities in Ontario
