= James, Ontario =

James
- Township (single-tier)
- Township of James
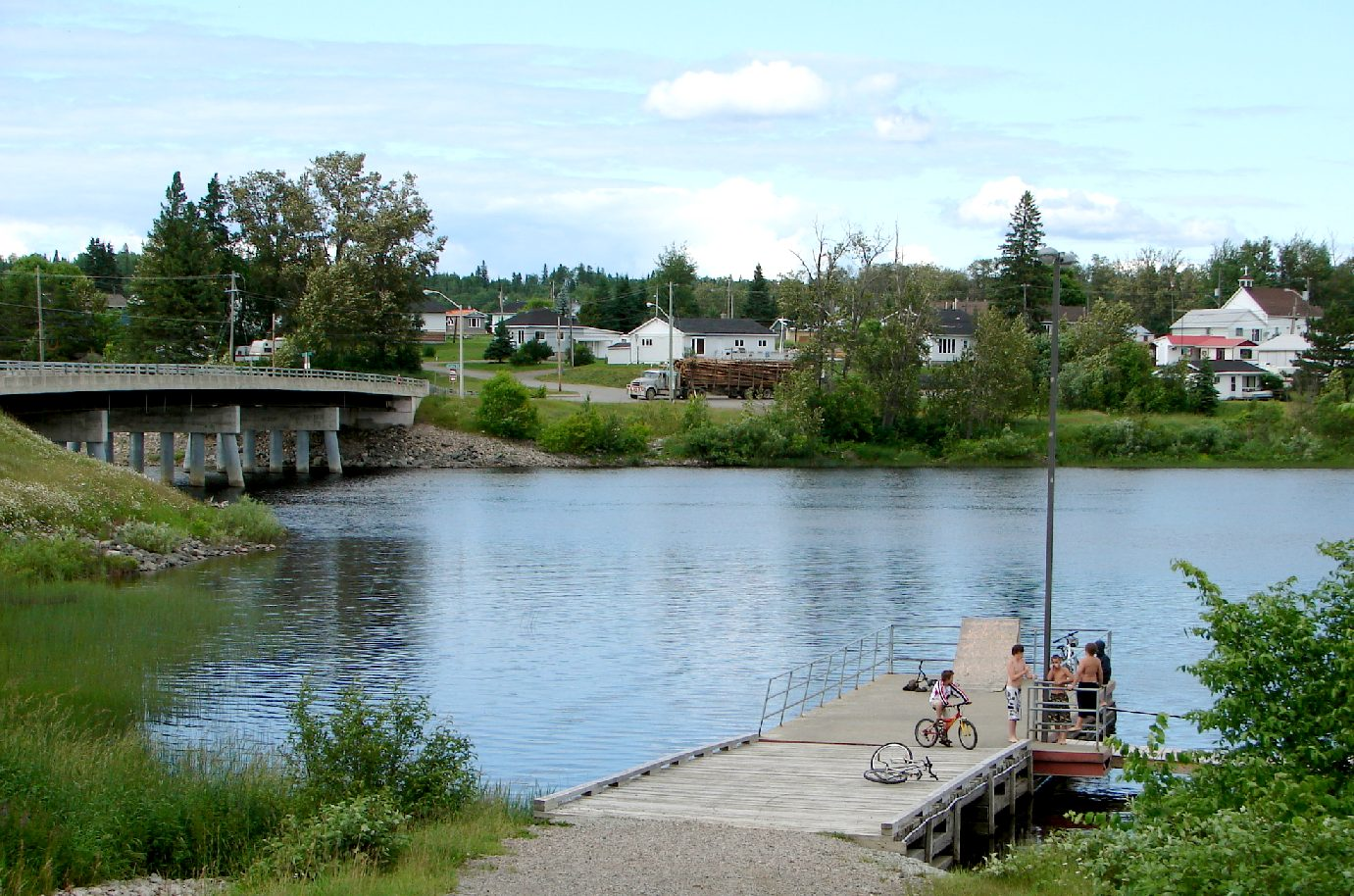

- Location within Ontario
- Coordinates: 47°42′38″N 80°20′22″W
- Country: Canada
- Province: Ontario
- District: Timiskaming
- Established: 1906
- Incorporated: 1909

Government
  - Reeve: Rodger Donaldson
  - Fed. riding: Nipissing—Timiskaming
  - Prov. riding: Timiskaming—Cochrane

Area
  - Land: 85.40 km^{2} (32.97 sq mi)

Population (2021)
  - Total: 348
  - Density: 4.1/km^{2} (11/sq mi)
- Time zone: UTC-5 (EST)
  - Summer (DST): UTC-4 (EDT)
- Postal code: P0J 1G0
- Area codes: 705, 249
- Website: www.elklake.ca

James is an incorporated township in the Canadian province of Ontario, located in Timiskaming District. The primary community within the township is Elk Lake, which is located at the junction of Highway 65 and Highway 560.

The township had a population of 348 in the 2021 Canadian census, compared to 420 in 2016.

Elk Lake Airport and Elk Lake Water Aerodrome are located here.

== History ==
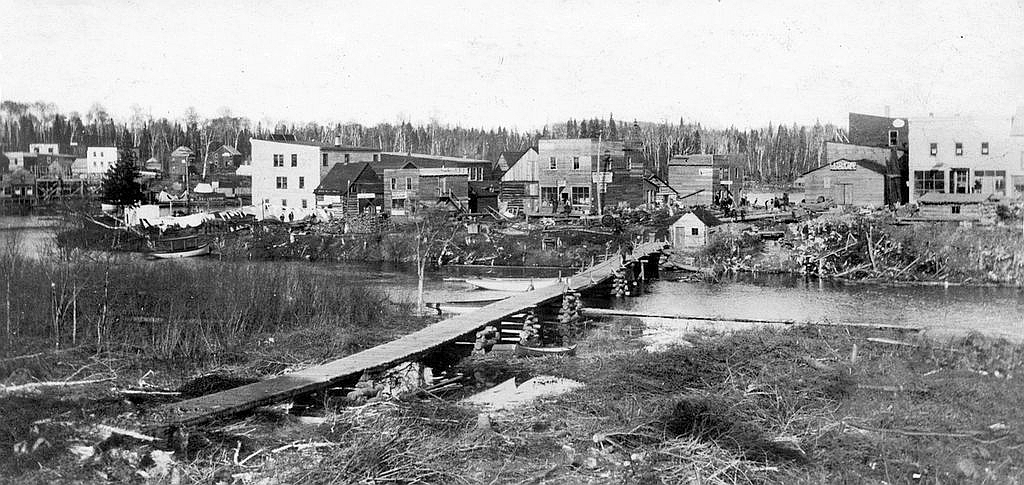
Elk Lake, c. 1910

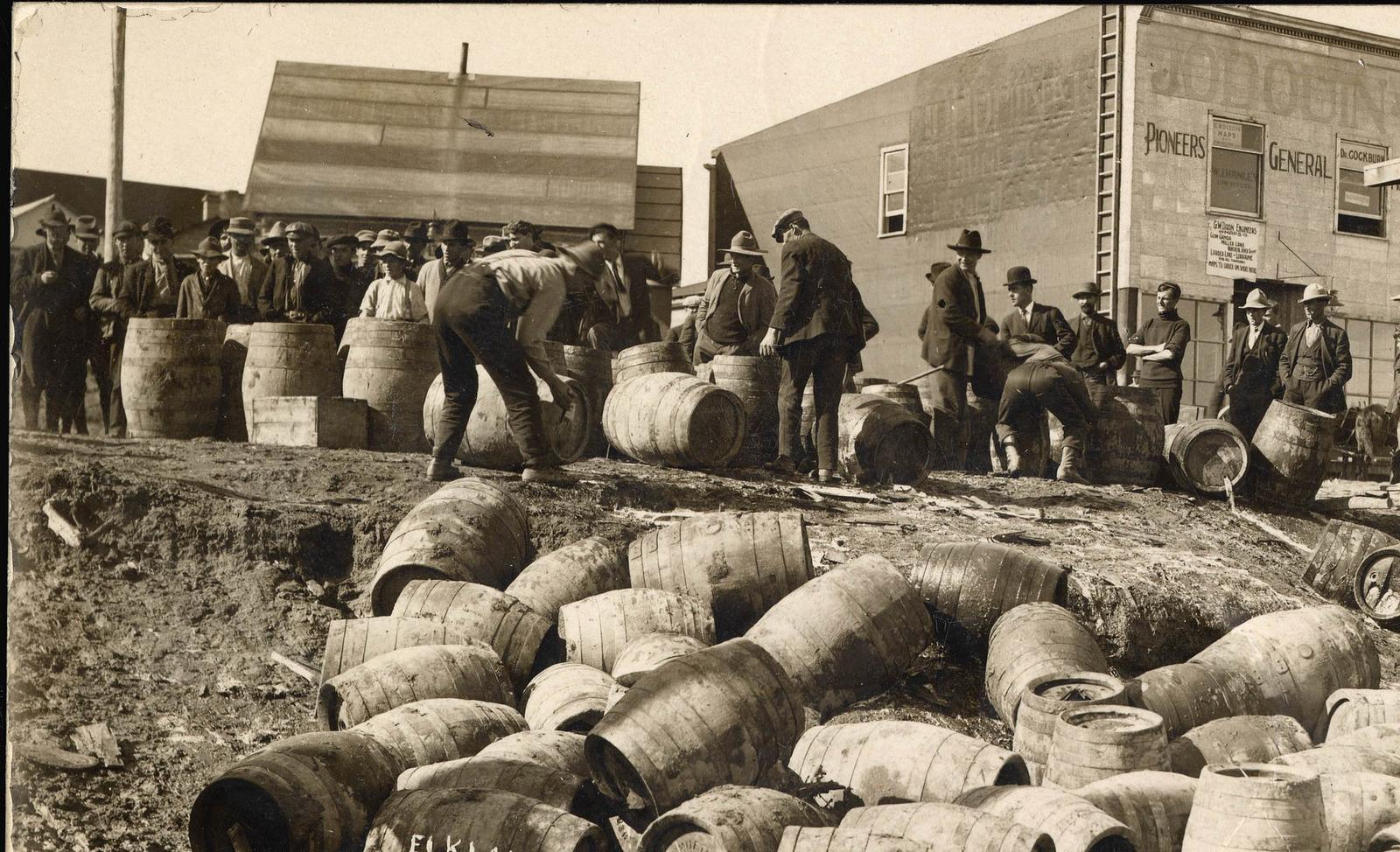
Liquor raid in Elk Lake, 1925

Elk Lake began as a mining boom town when native silver was discovered in James Township in 1906. Mining activity peaked between 1907 and 1913, when there were about thirty active mining properties in the area. The population at one point reached almost 10,000 people. By 1908 the town included six large hotels, many stores, warehouses, banks, lawyer's offices, a post office, a hospital and a Mining Recorder's Office. The town of Elk Lake was incorporated in 1909 as the Corporation of the Township of James. The Township's first Reeve was the famous athlete and prospector Jack Munroe.

Access to Elk Lake was initially only by motorboat via the Montreal River. By 1909 the road from Elk Lake to Charlton could be traversed by coach, although commercial steamers on the Montreal River continued to provide summer access from Latchford for most heavy equipment and freight. The steamboat era on the Montreal River lasted only a few years, ending when a branch of the Temiskaming and Northern Ontario Railway (now Ontario Northland Railway) was built into Elk Lake in 1913.

Commercial logging in the Temiskaming area dates back to the 1840s. In 1905, the Montreal River Pulp Concession, an area of 17,000 square miles (44,000 km^{2}), was sold to J. R. Booth. From 1907 to 1923, Booth maintained a large pulpwood depot in Elk Lake. In the spring of 1930, Booth completed the last log drive on the Montreal River shortly after he sold his local interest to the E.B. Eddy Company.

The Indian Chute Generating Station was constructed on the Montreal River in 1923, 16 km (9.9 mi) north-west of Elk Lake.

Today, Elk Lake's economy continues to be driven by a sustainable forest industry. The town also boasts a significant number of tourist camps and lodges offering excellent packages for the outdoor sports and nature enthusiasts.

The 1,420-hectare (3,500-acre) Makobe-Grays River Provincial Park has protected the Makobe River since 1985. This popular whitewater canoeing route flows into the Montreal River at Elk Lake.

== Demographics ==
In the 2021 Census of Population conducted by Statistics Canada, James had a population of 348 living in 181 of its 224 total private dwellings, a change of −17.1% from its 2016 population of 420. With a land area of 85.4 km^{2} (33.0 sq mi), it had a population density of 4.1/km^{2} (10.6/sq mi) in 2021.

Historical census populations – James, Ontario

Year	Pop.	±%
1911	626	—
1921	474	−24.3%
1931	682	+43.9%
1941	542	−20.5%
1951	560	+3.3%
1956	645	+15.2%
1961	701	+8.7%

Year	Pop.	±%
1966	620	−11.6%
1971	666	+7.4%
1976	619	−7.1%
1981	586	−5.3%
1986	583	−0.5%
1991	524	−10.1%
1996	483	−7.8%

Year	Pop.	±%
2001	467	−3.3%
2006	414	−11.3%
2011	424	+2.4%
2016	420	−0.9%
2021	348	−17.1%

Source: Statistics Canada

Mother tongue (2021):

- English as first language: 78.6%
- French as first language: 18.6%
- English and French as first languages: 2.9%
- Other as first language: 0%

== In popular culture ==
Canadian songwriter Hayden Desser recorded an album entitled Elk-Lake Serenade.

== See also ==
- List of townships in Ontario
- List of francophone communities in Ontario
