= Harris, Ontario =

Harris
- Township (single-tier)
- Township of Harris
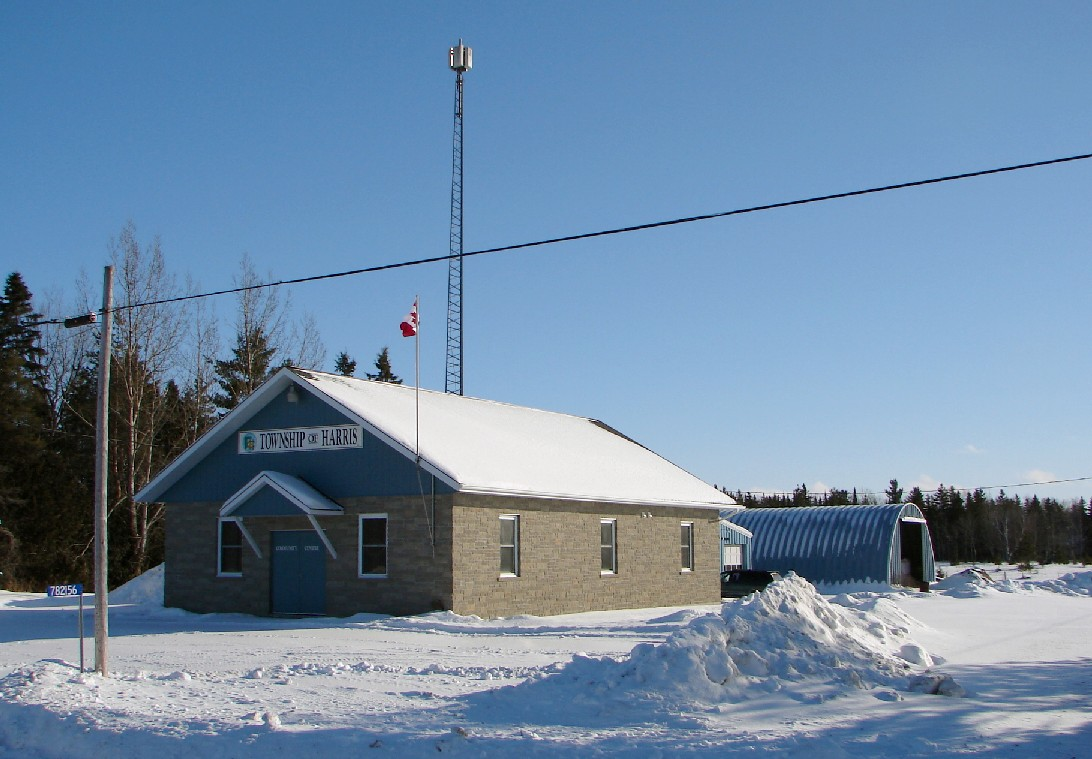
- Community centre in Harris

- Location within Ontario
- Coordinates: 47°34′N 79°34′W
- Country: Canada
- Province: Ontario
- District: Timiskaming

Government
  - Type: Township
  - Mayor: Chantal Despres
  - Fed. riding: Nipissing—Timiskaming
  - Prov. riding: Timiskaming—Cochrane

Area
  - Land: 49.81 km^{2} (19.23 sq mi)

Population (2021)
  - Total: 530
  - Density: 10.6/km^{2} (27/sq mi)
- Time zone: UTC-5 (EST)
  - Summer (DST): UTC-4 (EDT)
- Area codes: 705, 249

Harris is a township in the Timiskaming District in the Canadian province of Ontario.

Harris is located directly east of the city of Temiskaming Shores on the northern shore of Lake Timiskaming. The township's main settlement is the community of Sutton Bay.

== Demographics ==
In the 2021 Census of Population conducted by Statistics Canada, Harris had a population of 530 living in 205 of its 217 total private dwellings, a change of −2.8% from its 2016 population of 545. With a land area of 49.81 km^{2} (19.23 sq mi), it had a population density of 10.6/km^{2} (27.6/sq mi) in 2021.

Historical census populations – Harris, Ontario

Year	Pop.	±%
1901	124	—
1911	331	+166.9%
1921	379	+14.5%
1931	357	−5.8%
1941	365	+2.2%
1951	350	−4.1%
1956	364	+4.0%

Year	Pop.	±%
1961	337	−7.4%
1966	351	+4.2%
1971	407	+16.0%
1976	442	+8.6%
1981	544	+23.1%
1986	572	+5.1%
1991	558	−2.4%

Year	Pop.	±%
1996	553	−0.9%
2001	518	−6.3%
2006	512	−1.2%
2011	523	+2.1%
2016	545	+4.2%
2021	530	−2.8%

Source: Statistics Canada

Mother tongue (2021):

- English as first language: 66.0%
- French as first language: 30.2%
- English and French as first languages: 0.9%
- Other as first language: 1.9%

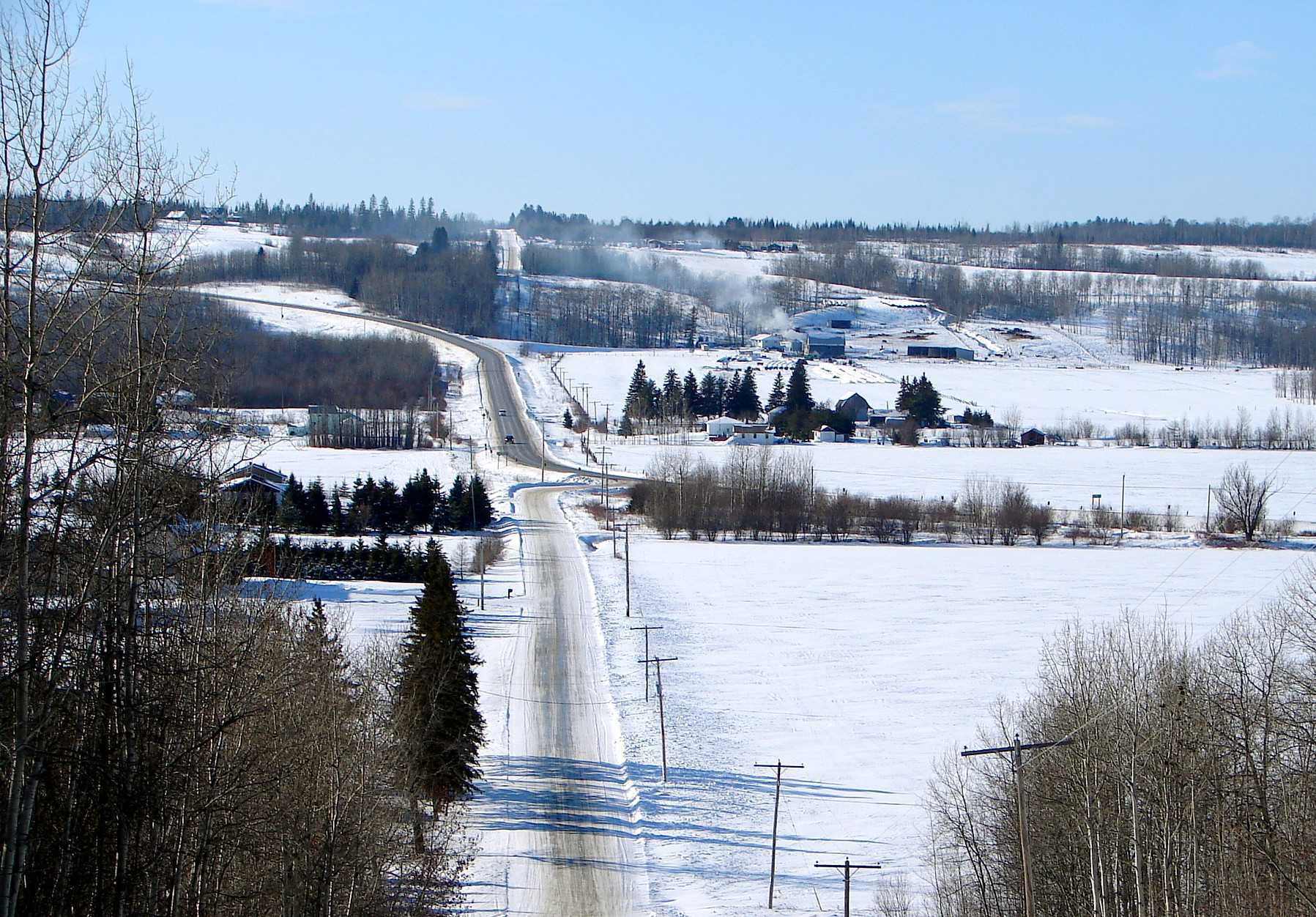
Countryside in Harris with Highway 65 in the distance.

== See also ==
- List of townships in Ontario
- List of francophone communities in Ontario
