= Evanturel =

- Township (single-tier)
- Township of Evanturel
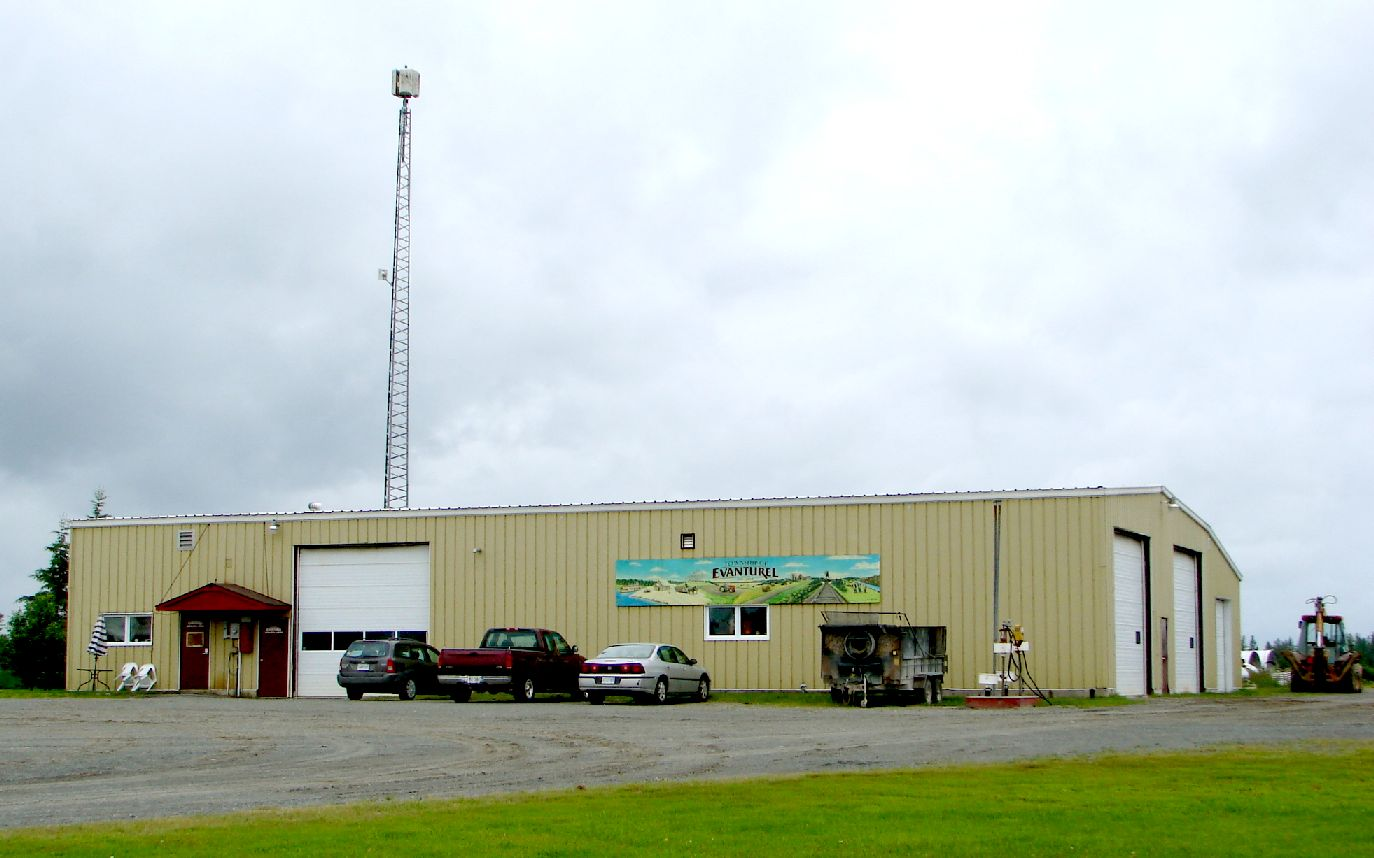
- Municipal building

- Location within Ontario
- Coordinates: 47°47′00″N 79°49′30″W
- Country: Canada
- Province: Ontario
- District: Timiskaming

Government
  - Type: Township
  - Reeve: Derek Mundle
  - Fed. riding: Nipissing—Timiskaming
  - Prov. riding: Timiskaming—Cochrane

Area
  - Land: 89.21 km^{2} (34.44 sq mi)

Population (2021)
  - Total: 502
  - Density: 5.6/km^{2} (15/sq mi)
- Time zone: UTC-5 (EST)
  - Summer (DST): UTC-4 (EDT)
- Postal Code: P0J 1H0
- Area codes: 705, 249
- Website: evanturel.com

Evanturel is a township in Timiskaming District, Ontario, Canada. It almost completely surrounds the town of Englehart. The main settlement in Evanturel is the community of Heaslip.

It was named after François-Eugène-Alfred Évanturel, the first Francophone speaker for the Ontario legislative assembly.

Kap-Kig-Iwan Provincial Park is partially located in the township.

== Demographics ==
In the 2021 Census of Population conducted by Statistics Canada, Evanturel had a population of 502 living in 193 of its 203 total private dwellings, a change of 11.8% from its 2016 population of 449. With a land area of 89.21 km^{2} (34.44 sq mi), it had a population density of 5.6/km^{2} (14.6/sq mi) in 2021.

Canada census – Evanturel community profile

	2021	2016	2011
Population	502 (+11.8% from 2016)	449 (-0.7% from 2011)	452 (-4.4% from 2006)
Land area	89.21 km^{2} (34.44 sq mi)	89.31 km^{2} (34.48 sq mi)	88.99 km^{2} (34.36 sq mi)
Population density	5.6/km^{2} (15/sq mi)	5.0/km^{2} (13/sq mi)	5.1/km^{2} (13/sq mi)
Median age	42.0 (M: 40.4, F: 44.8)	42.9 (M: 41.3, F: 46.2)	48.2 (M: 47.8, F: 48.6)
Private dwellings	203 (total) 193 (occupied)	201 (total)	194 (total)
Median household income	$97,000	$72,576

References: 2021 2016 2011

Historical census populations – Evanturel

Year	Pop.	±%
1911	317	—
1921	429	+35.3%
1931	490	+14.2%
1941	585	+19.4%
1951	668	+14.2%
1956	707	+5.8%
1961	714	+1.0%

Year	Pop.	±%
1966	686	−3.9%
1971	630	−8.2%
1976	629	−0.2%
1981	565	−10.2%
1986	563	−0.4%
1991	504	−10.5%
1996	493	−2.2%

Year	Pop.	±%
2001	506	+2.6%
2006	473	−6.5%
2011	452	−4.4%
2016	449	−0.7%
2021	502	+11.8%

Source: Statistics Canada

Mother tongue (2021):

- English as first language: 82.8%
- French as first language: 9.1%
- English and French as first languages: 2.0%
- Other as first language: 5.1%

== See also ==
- List of townships in Ontario
- List of francophone communities in Ontario
