= Chamberlain, Ontario =

Chamberlain
- Township (single-tier)
- Township of Chamberlain
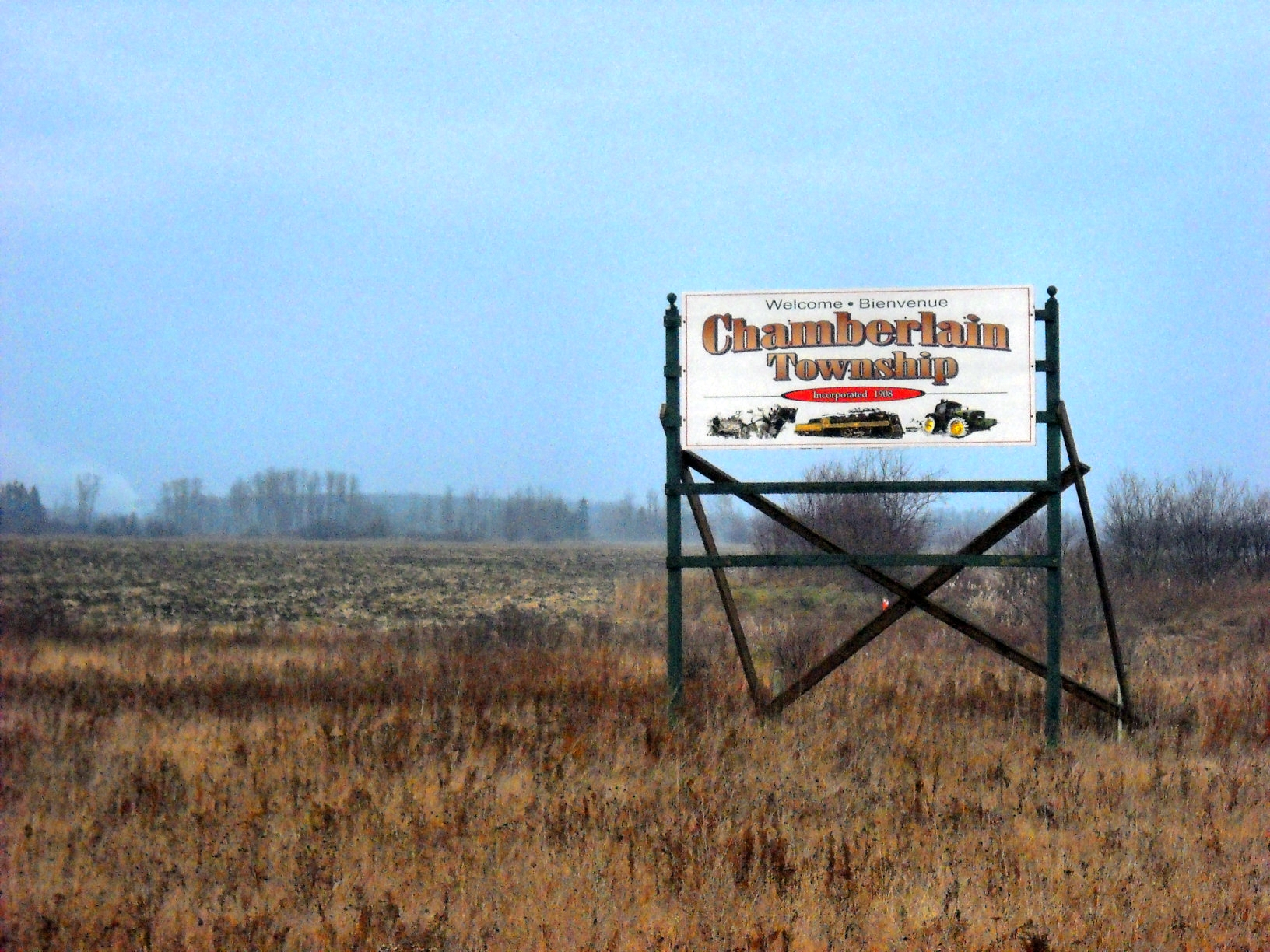

- Location within Ontario
- Coordinates: 47°53′00″N 79°56′00″W
- Country: Canada
- Province: Ontario
- District: Timiskaming
- Incorporated: 1908

Government
  - Type: Township
  - Reeve: Kerry Stewart
  - Fed. riding: Nipissing—Timiskaming
  - Prov. riding: Timiskaming—Cochrane

Area
  - Land: 110.81 km^{2} (42.78 sq mi)

Population (2021)
  - Total: 311
  - Density: 2.8/km^{2} (7.3/sq mi)
- Time zone: UTC-5 (EST)
  - Summer (DST): UTC-4 (EDT)
- Postal Code: P0J 1H0
- Area codes: 705, 249
- Website: www.chamberlaintownship.com

Chamberlain is a township in the Canadian province of Ontario, located within the Timiskaming District.

The rural township had a population of 311 in the 2021 Canadian census. Its primary named settlements are the communities of Chamberlain, Krugerdorf, and Wabewawa.

== History ==
Nomadic people moved through the area 6,000 to 8,000 years ago. The area then became home to Algonquin people.

European fur traders passed through the area beginning in the 1600s, likely following the Blanche River which flows through Chamberlain.

The Province of Ontario surveyed large areas to the north and west of Lake Timiskaming in the 1880s, and in 1888 Chamberlain was surveyed into seventy-two 160 acres (65 ha) lots.

Land was open for settlement at the head of Lake Timiskaming in 1891, and by 1902-03 settlers had moved into Chamberlain.

The newly constructed, provincially owned Temiskaming and Northern Ontario Railway (now Ontario Northland Railway) ran as far north as New Liskeard. In 1904, work began to build the railway north from there, through the east side of Chamberlain. Work trains were clearing the railway right-of-way north of Englehart in 1906.

Between 1905 and 1915, the railway offered free land to settlers.

Chamberlain Township was incorporated in 1908.

Between 1925 and 1927, the province began construction of the Ferguson Highway, a road system to connect North Bay to Cochrane. In Chamberlain, it used the Wawbewawa Road to the Lutheran Church corner, and then followed Chamberlain 5 to the present day Highway 573. It then turned north to Swastika. Realignment of 25 kilometres (16 mi) of road between Englehart and Round Lake occurred in 1939, creating Ontario Highway 11.

=== Krugerdorf ===
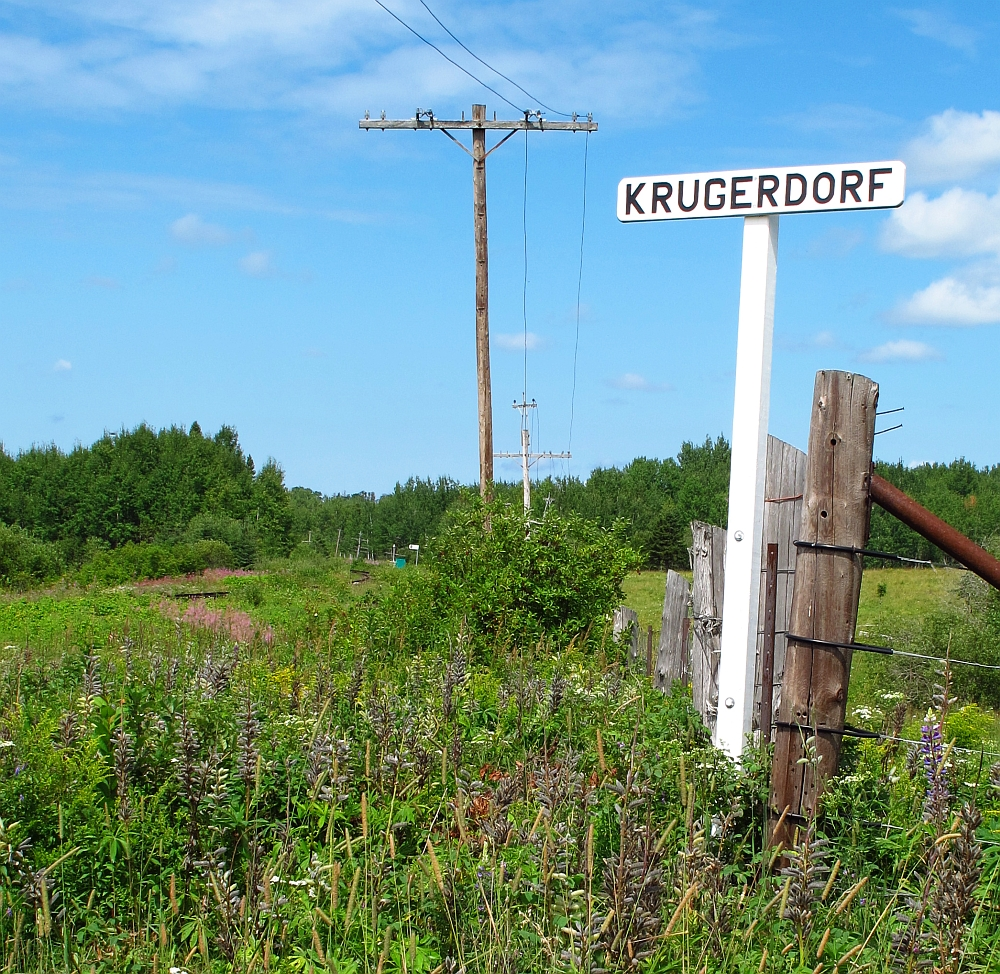
Looking north on the Ontario Northland Railway from the location of the former train station

August Kruger and Louise Mueller, immigrants from Germany, moved with their children to the area from Renfrew County in 1905. Kruger was 59.

Kruger was attracted to the area by the stone-free farmland, as well as the likelihood of finding land for his 5 sons. Kruger built a small house and a blacksmith shop. The Pembroke Deutsche Post reported in 1907 that the Krugers' new homestead comprised 820 acres (330 ha).

Kruger and his sons worked on the northern extension of the railway, and a station was built on their property. In their blacksmith shop they made railway spikes and shod horses. In time, the Kruger's built a sawmill on the Blanche River, as well as a threshing mill.

Other German-speaking families from the Renfrew area moved to the community, which was called "The German Settlement" until it was named Krugerdorf. English-speaking settlers from Toronto also settled there.

A Jewish community of about 50 families from Russia and Romania settled in the area, assisted by the Baron de Hirsch Institute of Montreal. The 'Northern Hebrew Cemetery' was established following the death of 3 settlers in a canoe accident.

Krugerdorf soon had a school, Lutheran church, Church of England, synagogue, 2 stores, gas station, boarding house, post office, railway station, community hall, and gravel pit.

The rich clay soil was suitable for growing crops, though the markets for beef and grain were distant and the growing season was short. Many farmers worked at lumber camps in winter to earn extra money.

The community began to decline in the 1920s, and a scattering of original buildings remain.

== Demographics ==
In the 2021 Census of Population conducted by Statistics Canada, Chamberlain had a population of 311 living in 132 of its 145 total private dwellings, a change of −6.3% from its 2016 population of 332. With a land area of 110.81 km^{2} (42.78 sq mi), it had a population density of 2.8/km^{2} (7.3/sq mi) in 2021.

Historical census populations – Chamberlain, Ontario

Year	Pop.	±%
1911	278	—
1921	382	+37.4%
1931	512	+34.0%
1941	526	+2.7%
1951	512	−2.7%
1956	421	−17.8%
1961	429	+1.9%

Year	Pop.	±%
1966	377	−12.1%
1971	377	+0.0%
1976	390	+3.4%
1981	344	−11.8%
1986	381	+10.8%
1991	364	−4.5%
1996	361	−0.8%

Year	Pop.	±%
2001	348	−3.6%
2006	322	−7.5%
2011	297	−7.8%
2016	332	+11.8%
2021	311	−6.3%

Source: Statistics Canada

Mother tongue (2021):

- English as first language: 87.3%
- French as first language: 6.3%
- English and French as first languages: 1.6%
- Neither English nor French: 4.8%

== See also ==
- List of francophone communities in Ontario
- List of townships in Ontario
