= Timiskaming District =

Timiskaming District District de Timiskaming
- District
- Location of Timiskaming District in Ontario
- Coordinates: 47.8°N 80.3°W
- Country: Canada
- Province: Ontario
- Region: Northeastern Ontario
- Created: 1912

Government
  - MPs: Gaétan Malette, Pauline Rochefort
  - MPPs: France Gélinas, John Vanthof

Area
  - Land: 13,247.40 km^{2} (5,114.85 sq mi)

Population (2021)
  - Total: 31,424
  - Density: 2.4/km^{2} (6.2/sq mi)
- Time zone: UTC-5 (Eastern (EST))
  - Summer (DST): UTC-4 (EDT)
- Postal code FSA: P0J, P0K, P2N
- Area codes: 705, 249
- Seat: Temiskaming Shores

Timiskaming is a district and census division in Northeastern Ontario in the Canadian province of Ontario. The district was created in 1912 from parts of Algoma, Nipissing, and Sudbury districts. In 1921, Cochrane District was created from parts of this district and parts of Thunder Bay District.

It is just west of the similarly named Témiscamingue regional county municipality in Quebec, which is administratively part of the greater region of Abitibi-Témiscamingue.

Temiskaming District is home to several provincial parks.

== History ==
The coureurs de bois explored and traded fur in what is now the Timiskaming District, in the 17th century.

== Subdivisions ==
City:

- Temiskaming Shores (Haileybury, New Liskeard, Dymond Township, North Cobalt)

Towns:

- Cobalt
- Englehart
- Kirkland Lake (Chaput Hughes, Swastika)
- Latchford

Townships:

- Armstrong (Earlton)
- Brethour
- Casey (Belle Vallée)
- Chamberlain
- Charlton and Dack
- Coleman
- Evanturel
- Gauthier (Dobie)
- Harley
- Harris
- Hilliard (Hilliardton)
- Hudson
- James (Elk Lake)
- Kerns
- Larder Lake
- Matachewan
- McGarry (Kearns, Virginiatown)

Village:

- Thornloe

Unorganized areas:

- Timiskaming, Unorganized, East Part
- Timiskaming, Unorganized, West Part (Gowganda, Kenabeek, King Kirkland, Marshall's Corners, Marter, Sesekinika, Tarzwell, Tomstown)

The following local services boards serve inhabitants of these unincorporated areas:

- Kenogami
- King-Lebel
- Maisonville
- Savard

=== First Nations reserve ===
- Matachewan 72

=== Geographical townships ===
- Alma
- Argyle
- Armstrong
- Arnold
- Auld
- Baden
- Banks
- Bannockburn
- Barber
- Barr
- Bartlett
- Bayly
- Beauchamp
- Bernhardt
- Blain
- Bompas
- Boston
- Brethour
- Brewster
- Brigstocke
- Bryce
- Bucke
- Burt
- Cairo
- Cane
- Casey
- Catharine
- Chamberlain
- Charters
- Childerhose
- Chown
- Cleaver
- Cole
- Coleman
- Corkill
- Corley
- Dack
- Dane
- Davidson
- Donovan
- Doon
- Douglas
- Doyle
- Dufferin
- Dunmore
- Dymond
- Eby
- Evanturel
- Fallon
- Farr
- Fasken
- Firstbrook
- Flavelle
- Fripp
- Gamble
- Gauthier
- Geikie
- Gillies Limit
- Grenfell
- Gross
- Harley
- Harris
- Haultain
- Hearst
- Henwood
- Hillary
- Hilliard
- Hincks
- Holmes
- Hudson
- Ingram
- James
- Katrine
- Kerns
- Kimberley
- Kittson
- Klock
- Knight
- Lawson
- Lebel
- Leckie
- Lee
- Leith
- Leo
- Leonard
- Lorrain
- Lundy
- Maisonville
- Marquis
- Marter
- McArthur
- McElroy
- McFadden
- McGarry
- McGiffin
- McKeown
- McNeil
- McVittie
- Medina
- Michie
- Mickle
- Midlothian
- Milner
- Montrose
- Morel
- Morrisette
- Mulligan
- Musgrove
- Nicol
- Nordica
- North Williams
- Ossian
- Otto
- Pacaud
- Pense
- Pharand
- Powell
- Rankin
- Rattray
- Ray
- Raymond
- Reynolds
- Roadhouse
- Robertson
- Robillard
- Rorke
- Savard
- Sharpe
- Sheba
- Shillington
- Skead
- Smyth
- South Lorrain
- Speight
- Teck
- Terry
- Trethewey
- Truax
- Tudhope
- Tyrrell
- Van Hise
- van Nostrand
- Wallis
- Whitson
- Willet
- Willison
- Yarrow

== Demographics ==
As a census division in the 2021 Census of Population conducted by Statistics Canada, the Timiskaming District had a population of 31,424 living in 14,132 of its 16,290 total private dwellings, a change of −2.6% from its 2016 population of 32,251. With a land area of 13,247.4 km^{2} (5,114.8 sq mi), it had a population density of 2.4/km^{2} (6.1/sq mi) in 2021.

Canada census – Timiskaming District community profile

	2021	2016	2011
Population	31,424 (-2.6% from 2016)	32,251 (−1.2% from 2011)	32,634 (−1.9% from 2006)
Land area	13,247.40 km^{2} (5,114.85 sq mi)	13,303.30 km^{2} (5,136.43 sq mi)	13,299.92 km^{2} (5,135.13 sq mi)
Population density	2.4/km^{2} (6.2/sq mi)	2.4/km^{2} (6.2/sq mi)	2.5/km^{2} (6.5/sq mi)
Median age	47.6 (M: 46.8, F: 48.8)	47.2 (M: 46.2, F: 48.0)	46.6 (M: 45.9, F: 47.2)
Private dwellings	16,290 (total) 14,132 (occupied)	16,862 (total) 14,395 (occupied)	16,330 (total)
Median household income	$70,500	$59,630

References: 2021 2016 2011

Historical census populations – Timiskaming District

Year	Pop.	±%
1921	26,657	—
1931	37,043	+39.0%
1941	50,604	+36.6%
1951	50,016	−1.2%
1956	50,264	+0.5%
1961	50,971	+1.4%

Year	Pop.	±%
1966	47,154	−7.5%
1971	46,485	−1.4%
1976	43,704	−6.0%
1981	41,288	−5.5%
1986	40,307	−2.4%
1991	38,983	−3.3%

Year	Pop.	±%
1996	37,807	−3.0%
2001	34,442	−8.9%
2006	33,283	−3.4%
2011	32,634	−1.9%
2016	32,251	−1.2%
2021	31,424	−2.6%

Population counts are not adjusted for boundary changes.
Source: Statistics Canada

== Politics ==
The district seat is in Temiskaming Shores.

Along with portions of the neighbouring district, Cochrane, Timiskaming is vastly represented in the Legislative Assembly of Ontario by John Vanthof, but a very small portion of the district also belongs to the riding of Nickel Belt. In the House of Commons of Canada, the district is divided between Nipissing—Timiskaming, represented by Pauline Rochefort, in the south, and Kapuskasing—Timmins—Mushkegowuk, represented by Gaétan Malette, in the north.

== See also ==
- List of townships in Ontario
- List of secondary schools in Ontario#Timiskaming District
