= Casey, Ontario =

Casey
- Township (single-tier)
- Township of Casey
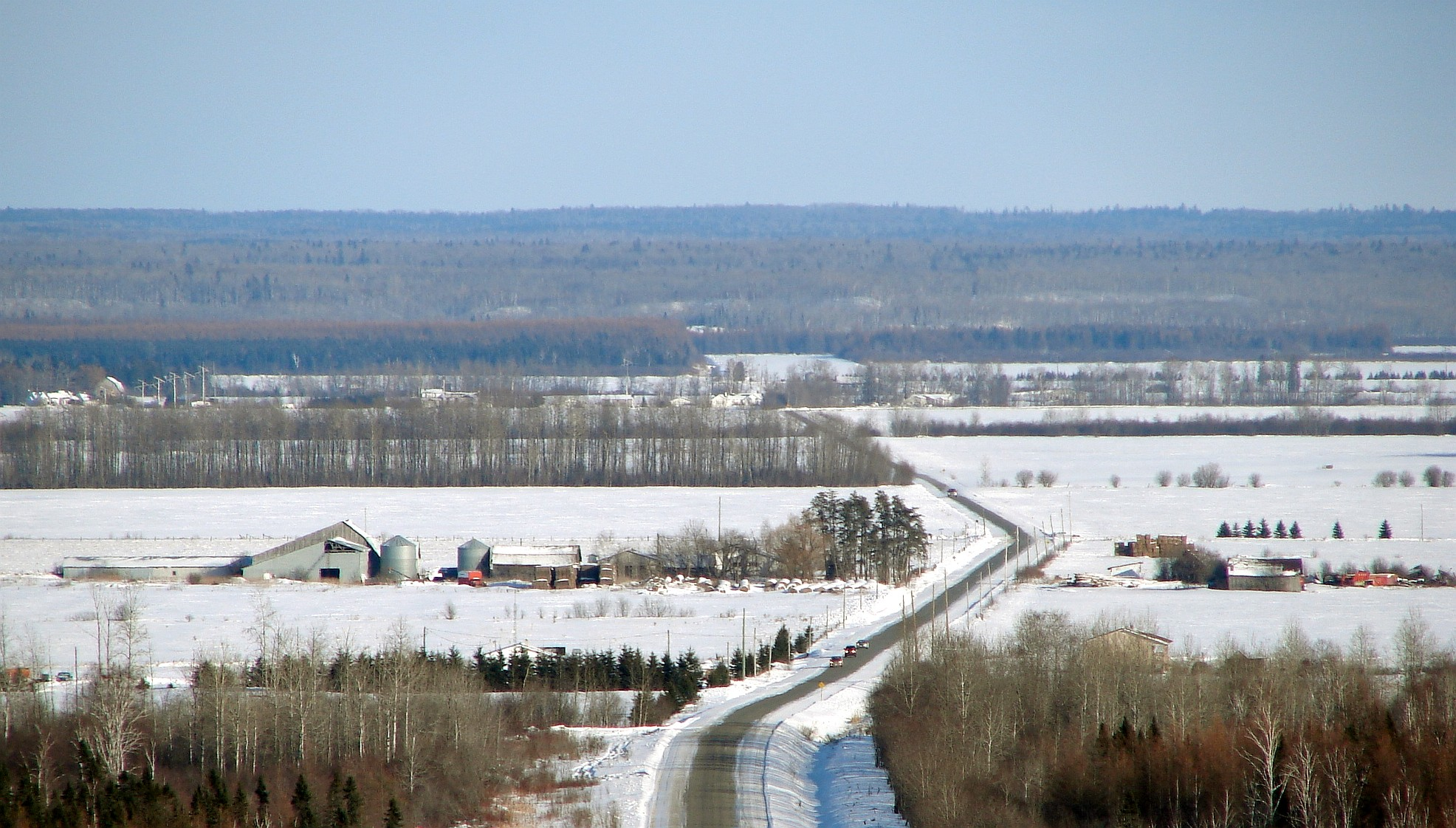

- Location within Ontario
- Coordinates: 47°37′30″N 79°34′00″W
- Country: Canada
- Province: Ontario
- District: Timiskaming

Government
  - Type: Township
  - Reeve: Guy Labonté
  - Fed. riding: Nipissing—Timiskaming
  - Prov. riding: Timiskaming—Cochrane

Area
  - Land: 80.80 km^{2} (31.20 sq mi)

Population (2021)
  - Total: 341
  - Density: 4.2/km^{2} (11/sq mi)
- Time zone: UTC-5 (EST)
  - Summer (DST): UTC-4 (EDT)
- Postal Code: P0J 1A0
- Area codes: 705, 249
- Website: casey.ca

Casey is a township in the Canadian province of Ontario, located within the Timiskaming District.

The township had a population of 341 in the 2021 census. The main communities in the township are Belle Vallée, Judge, and Pearson. The municipal offices are located in Belle Vallée.

The township is named after George Elliott Casey, member of the House of Commons of Canada from 1872 to 1900.

== Demographics ==
In the 2021 Census of Population conducted by Statistics Canada, Casey had a population of 341 living in 127 of its 140 total private dwellings, a change of −7.3% from its 2016 population of 368. With a land area of 80.8 km^{2} (31.2 sq mi), it had a population density of 4.2/km^{2} (10.9/sq mi) in 2021.

Historical census populations – Casey, Ontario

Year	Pop.	±%
1901	62	—
1911	264	+325.8%
1921	407	+54.2%
1931	560	+37.6%
1941	547	−2.3%
1951	597	+9.1%
1956	653	+9.4%

Year	Pop.	±%
1961	679	+4.0%
1966	604	−11.0%
1971	586	−3.0%
1976	483	−17.6%
1981	441	−8.7%
1986	437	−0.9%
1991	425	−2.7%

Year	Pop.	±%
1996	421	−0.9%
2001	421	+0.0%
2006	385	−8.6%
2011	374	−2.9%
2016	368	−1.6%
2021	341	−7.3%

Source: Statistics Canada

Mother tongue (2021):

- English as first language: 47.8%
- French as first language: 42.0%
- English and French as first languages: 2.9%
- Other as first language: 4.3%

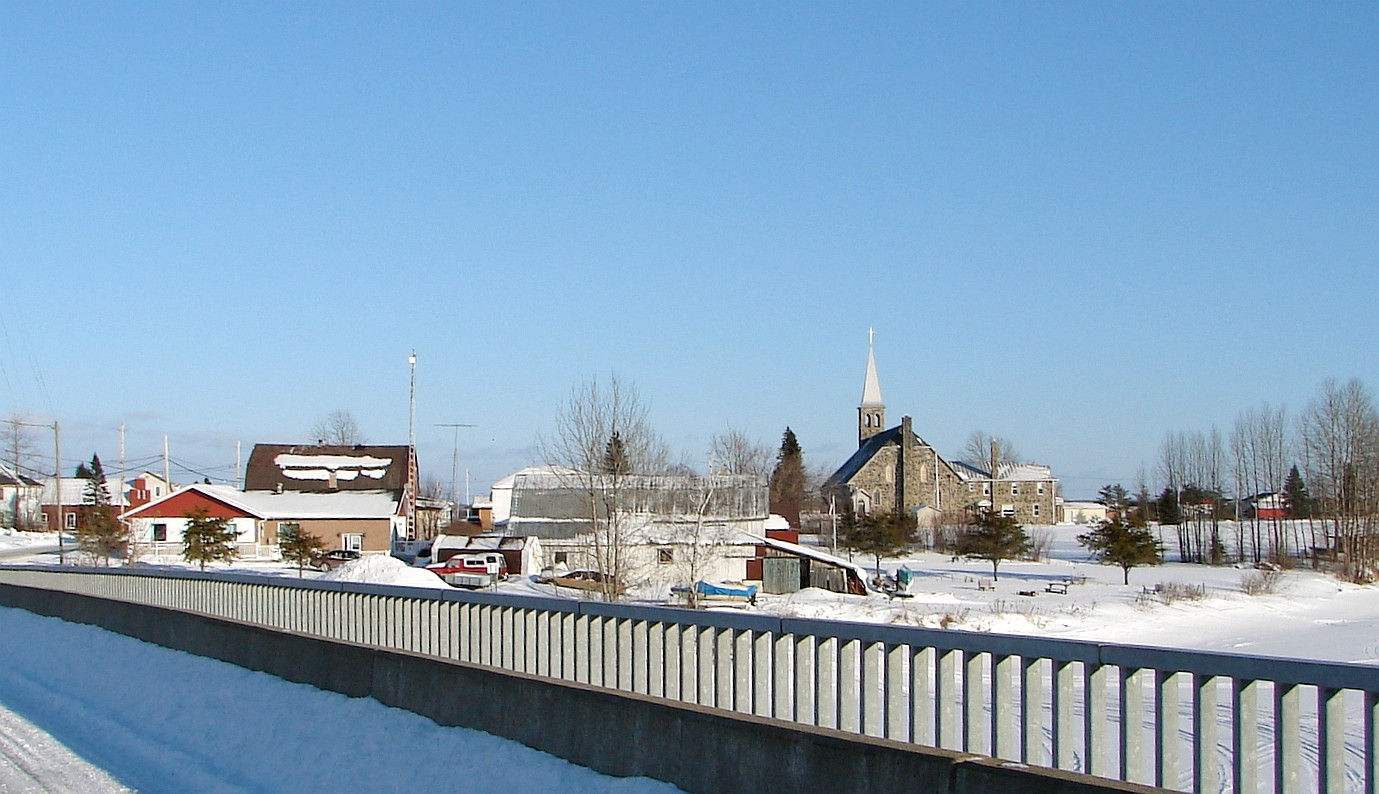
Belle Vallée

== See also ==
- List of townships in Ontario
- List of francophone communities in Ontario
