= Thornloe =

- Village (single-tier)
- Village of Thornloe
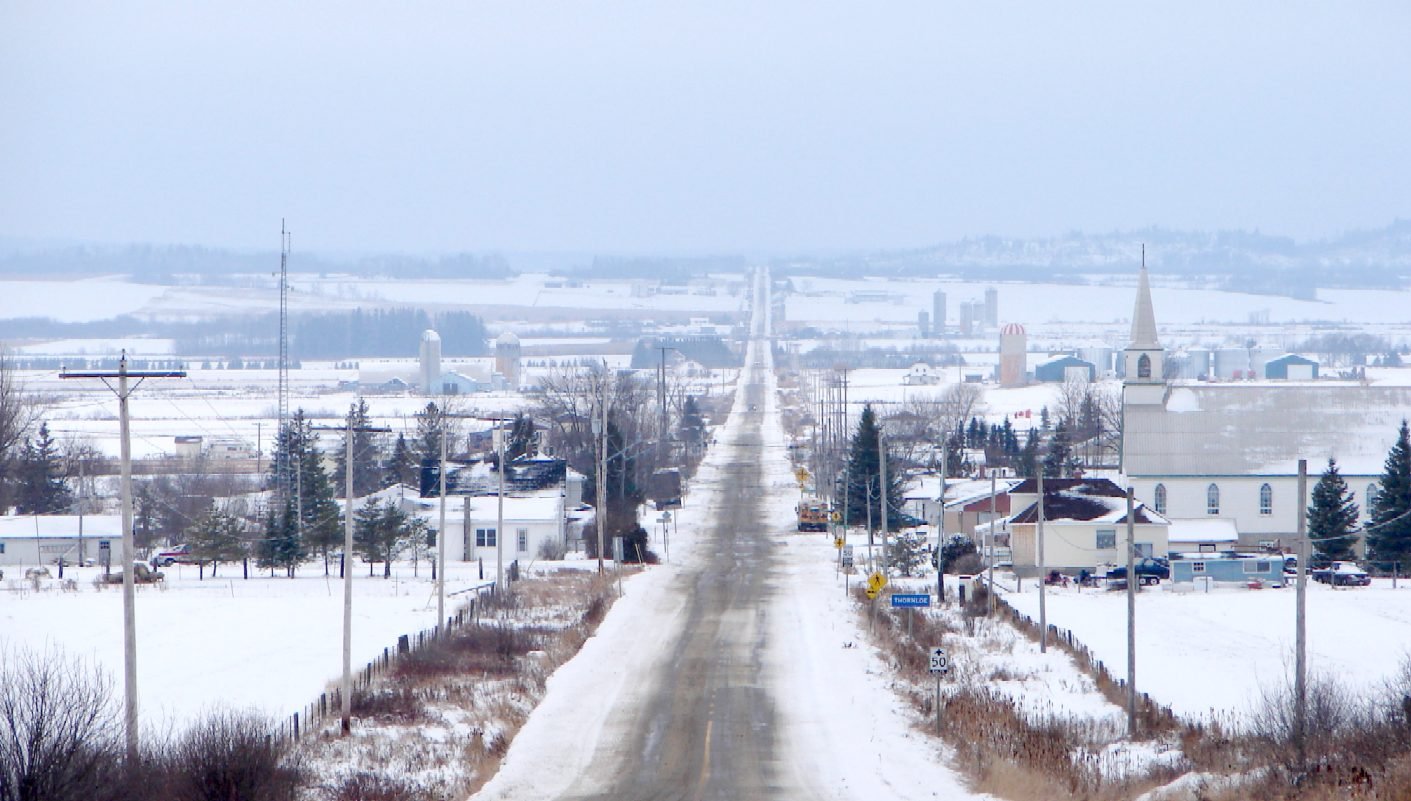

- Location within Ontario
- Coordinates: 47°40′00″N 79°45′30″W
- Country: Canada
- Province: Ontario
- District: Timiskaming

Government
  - Type: Village
  - Reeve: Wayne Miller

Area
  - Land: 6.59 km^{2} (2.54 sq mi)
- Elevation: 220 m (722 ft)

Population (2021)
  - Total: 92
  - Density: 14/km^{2} (36/sq mi)
- Time zone: UTC-5 (EST)
  - Summer (DST): UTC-4 (EDT)
- Postal Code: P0J
- Area code: 705

Thornloe is a village in the Canadian province of Ontario, located in the Timiskaming District. The village had a population of 92 in the 2021 Canadian census.

Thornloe was destroyed in the Great Fire of 1922.

== Thornloe Cheese Factory ==
Thornloe Cheese has been produced in the village since 1940. The original home of Thornloe Cheese was built in the village of Thornloe in 1940. It continued to operate in that location until a new plant was built in 1969 at the current location on Highway 11 just north of the City of Temiskaming Shores, and it was a popular attraction for tourists.

The Thornloe Cheese Factory employed more than 35 full and part-time workers, and purchased over 3 million litres of milk from local farmers.

Gay Lea, current owners of the Thornloe Cheese brand since 2019 decided to shutter the business after 83 years of production on October 31, 2023, citing it too costly to upgrade to current standards. The Thornloe Cheese Factory had been shut down since serious equipment failures halted operations in mid-September 2023.

== Demographics ==
In the 2021 Census of Population conducted by Statistics Canada, Thornloe had a population of 92 living in 48 of its 53 total private dwellings, a change of −17.9% from its 2016 population of 112. With a land area of 6.59 km^{2} (2.54 sq mi), it had a population density of 14.0/km^{2} (36.2/sq mi) in 2021.

Historical census populations – Thornloe, Ontario

Year	Pop.	±%
1911	52	—
1921	141	+171.2%
1931	144	+2.1%
1941	145	+0.7%
1951	180	+24.1%
1956	198	+10.0%
1961	211	+6.6%

Year	Pop.	±%
1966	157	−25.6%
1971	138	−12.1%
1976	151	+9.4%
1981	170	+12.6%
1986	164	−3.5%
1991	132	−19.5%
1996	132	+0.0%

Year	Pop.	±%
2001	120	−9.1%
2006	105	−12.5%
2011	123	+17.1%
2016	112	−8.9%
2021	92	−17.9%

Source: Statistics Canada

Mother tongue (2021):

- English as first language: 66.7%
- French as first language: 27.8%
- English and French as first languages: 0%
- Other as first language: 0%

== See also ==
- List of francophone communities in Ontario
