= Ferguson Highway =

Frontier northern Ontario highway

Route information
- Maintained by Ontario Department of Highways
- Length: 420 km (260 mi)
- History: Constructed 1925–1927

Major junctions
- South end: North Bay
- North end: Cochrane

Location
- Country: Canada
- Province: Ontario

Highway system
- Roads in Ontario

The Ferguson Highway was a 260 mi (420 km) long gravel trunk road in Ontario, Canada. Built between 1925 and 1927 from the city of North Bay to the town of Cochrane, it was created to connect the growing agricultural and mining communities of Northern Ontario with other areas further south. The road eventually became part of Highway 11, and was largely bypassed by improved routings in the 1940s and 1950s.

Several sections of rebuilt local roads were incorporated into the Ferguson Highway, with the final link being completed through the thick forest of Temagami. The highway was officially opened on July 2, 1927, and was named in honour of Premier George Howard Ferguson. It quickly became an important access route to settlements and tourist areas in Northern Ontario.

== History ==
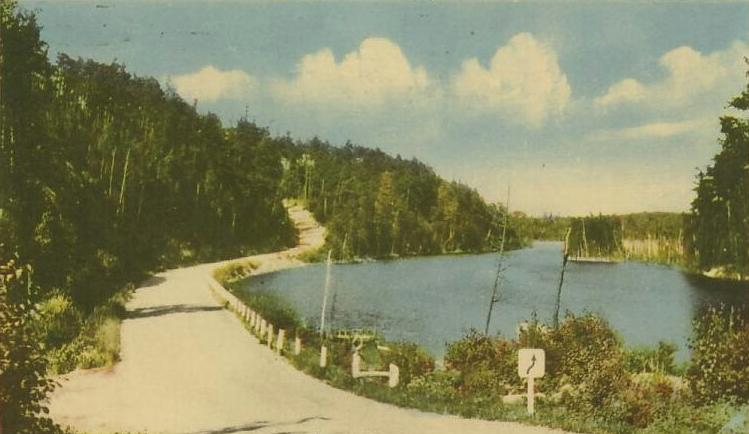
Postcard photo of the Ferguson Highway circa 1940. This portion of the highway is now known as Wilson Lake Road.

Although it was named for the man who campaigned to premiership on the promise of building the road, the Ferguson Highway was an inevitable extension of the Muskoka Colonization Road that came to be known as part of it.

=== The Muskoka Road ===
Construction of the Muskoka Road began at a portage site at the mouth of the Severn River where a harbour known as Washago was established. In 1858, work began on a trail north towards the survey line of the Peterson Road. Thomas J. McMurray established Bracebridge in the spring of 1861 at the northernmost point of the Muskoka Road where it intersected the Peterson Road. The road was completed as far as Utterson in 1862.

Over the next decade, work progressed on the northward extension of the Muskoka Road through Vernon Lake, Huntsville and the unsurveyed territory north to Emsdale, eventually reaching Burk's Falls in 1878. Between 1881 and 1887, the route was pushed to Sundridge, where an existing road connected to South River, at which point work concentrated on opening up access roads to nearby railway stations and resources. It would take a quarter-century for construction to resume on the road. In 1912, work began south from North Bay towards Powassan. Upon the completion of that section, the remaining 20 miles (32 km) between Powassan and South River was built. In 1916, it became possible for the first time to drive from Toronto to North Bay without travelling through Pembroke.

=== Onwards to Cochrane ===
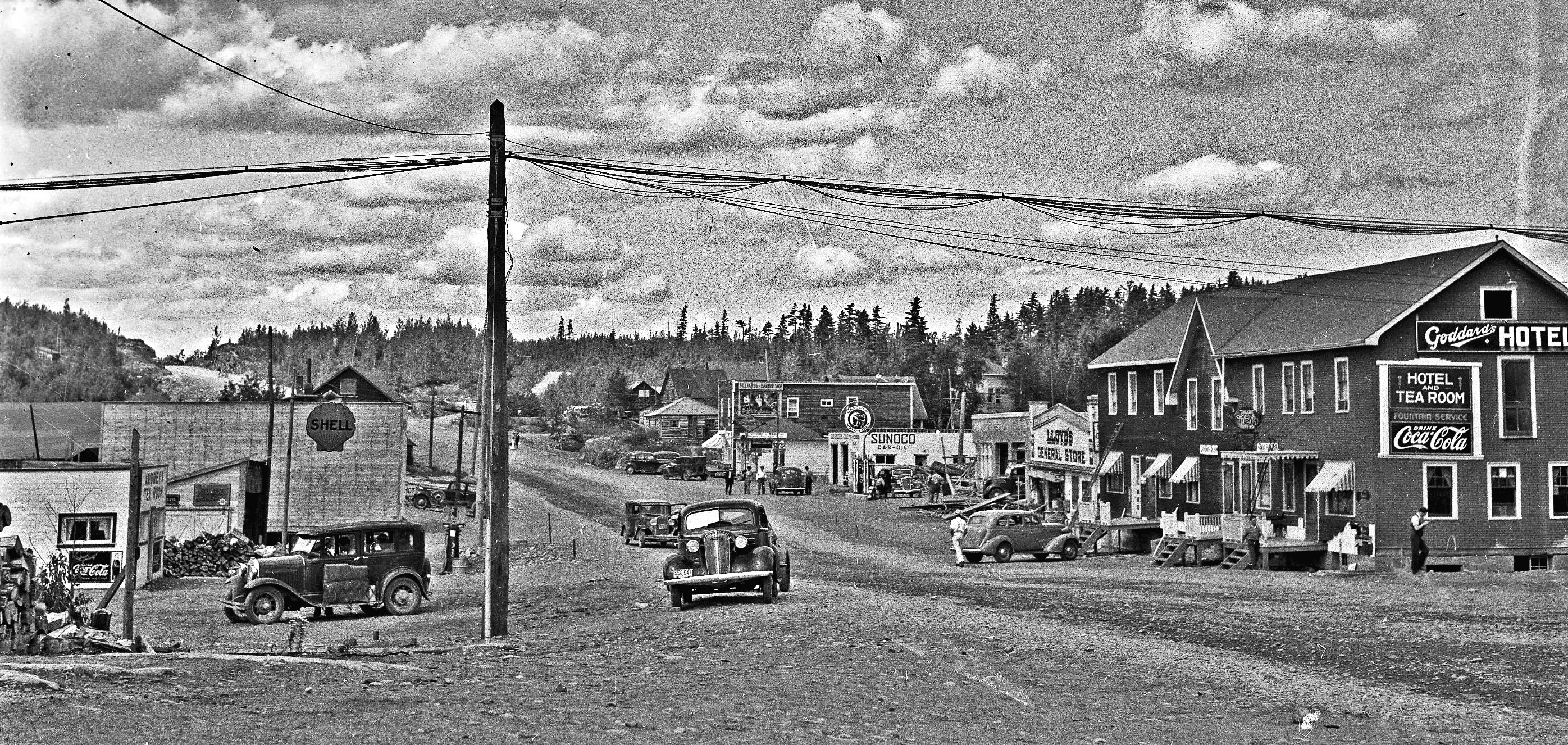
Facing north along the Ferguson Highway through Temagami, shortly after being designated as part of Highway 11

In June 1923, Howard Ferguson campaigned to victory, with one of his pledges being the construction of a trunk road from North Bay to the farmland of New Liskeard and the mineral resources of Kirkland Lake and Cochrane. By then, a gravel road had already been constructed between Latchford and New Liskeard. This road started as a connection between the communities of Latchford and Cobalt, the latter of which was already connected with nearby Haileybury. In 1912, following the passing of the Northern and Northwestern Development Act, which allocated funding towards the development of trunk roads, it was gravelled north of Cobalt and extended to New Liskeard.

After Ferguson's victory, construction began immediately on two sections. The first section was a 32-kilometre (20 mi) gravel road built south from Latchford to Temagami; the second was a 240-kilometre (150 mi) road, mostly gravelled, built north from New Liskeard to Cochrane via Earlton, Englehart, Dane, Swastika, Matheson, Monteith and Porquis Junction. Both were complete by 1925. The Latchford–Cobalt section was also given a gravel surface that year. In 1926, the final 100 kilometres (62 mi) south of Temagami to North Bay way opened to traffic, having taken the longest to construct through the impenetrable Temagami Forest.

The fully gravelled North Bay to Cochrane Trunk Road was ceremoniously opened by William Finlayson, the Department of Lands and Forests, on July 2, 1927, (Note: Myers gives July 1 as the ceremony date, but both Shragge & Bagnato and the historical plaque commemorating the route indicate July 2.) and named in honour of Ferguson. The route was later assumed as an extension of Highway 11 throughout June 1937, following the amalgamation of the Department of Northern Development into the Department of Highways on April 1.

== Route description ==
The vast majority of the Ferguson Highway has been bypassed by the provincial highway network; however, a select few sections were incorporated into the alignment of Highway 11, while others remain as portions of, from south to north, Highway 11B, Highway 562, Highway 571, Highway 573, Highway 112, Highway 66 and Highway 668. The remaining sections have either become local access roads or have been abandoned and subsequently consumed by nature.

=== Tonomo Lake Road ===
Wilson Lake Road
- Location: Latchford–North Bay

Tonomo Lake Road is a gravel road in the municipality of Temagami, Northeastern Ontario, Canada. It runs in a north–south direction, connected on both ends by Highway 11. 19 km (12 mi) long. Tonomo Lake Road was originally part of the Ferguson Highway, which has been replaced by Highway 11.

By 1940, the portion of Ferguson Highway comprising Wilson Lake Road was bypassed. Highway 11 is now situated on the east side of Jumping Cariboo Lake. Even though the Ferguson Highway was created for people to travel, most visited Temagami by train until the highway was improved in the 1950s. An old bridge built as part of the Ferguson Highway still stands on the road.
