= Ontario Highway 112 =

Ontario provincial highway

Highway 112
- Highway 112 highlighted in red

Route information
- Maintained by the Ministry of Transportation of Ontario
- Length: 19.6 km (12.2 mi)
- Existed: 1953–present

Major junctions
- South end: Highway 11 near Tarzwell
- Highway 564; Highway 650 – Dane, Adam's Mine
- North end: Highway 66 near Kirkland Lake

Location
- Country: Canada
- Province: Ontario
- Divisions: Timiskaming District

Highway system
- Ontario provincial highways; Current; Former; 400-series
← Highway 108	→ Highway 115
Former provincial highways
← Highway 111	Highway 114 →

King's Highway 112, commonly referred to as Highway 112, is a provincially maintained highway in the northern portion of the Canadian province of Ontario. Formerly part of the Ferguson Highway, the route was designated with its own number in 1953, prior to which it formed a part of Highway 11. It travels east of the current Highway 11, around Round Lake and through Dane before ending at Highway 66 southwest of Kirkland Lake.

== Route description ==
Highway 112 begins in the south at Highway 11, 3.4 kilometres (2.1 mi) south of Tarzwell, north of which it passes along the eastern shoreline of Round Lake. Travelling alongside but out of site of a railway line, the highway continues north to Dame, meeting the eastern terminus of Secondary Highway 650. The route winds north, crossing the railway line before ending at Highway 66, part of the Trans-Canada Highway, between Swastika and Chaput Hughes, southwest of the primary urban area of Kirkland Lake. The route is 19.8 kilometres (12.3 mi) long, and is situated entirely within Timiskaming District.

Like other provincial routes in Ontario, Highway 112 is maintained by the Ministry of Transportation of Ontario. In 2010, traffic surveys conducted by the ministry showed that on average, 1,950 vehicles used the highway daily along the section between Dane and Highway 66, while 1,350 vehicles did so each day along the remainder of the route, the highest and lowest counts along the highway, respectively.

== History ==
Highway 112 travels along the Ferguson Highway, the original alignment of Highway 11, until the Round Lake Diversion was constructed and Highway 11 rerouted onto it. The 240-kilometre (150 mi) Ferguson Highway, mostly gravelled, was built north from New Liskeard to Cochrane via Earlton, Englehart, Dane, Swastika, Matheson, Monteith and Porquis Junction beginning in late 1923; it was complete by 1925. During the early 1950s, the Round Lake Diversion was constructed, bypassing the original route of Highway 11 from south of Tarzwell to the present day junction with Highway 66. The original route was designated as Highway 112 upon completion of the diversion in 1953. The route has remained unchanged since.

== Major intersections ==
The following table lists the major junctions along Highway 112, as noted by the Ministry of Transportation of Ontario. The entire route is located in Timiskaming District.

Location	km	mi	Destinations	Notes
Unorganized West Timiskaming	0.0	0.0	Highway 11 / TCH – North Bay, Cochrane	Southern terminus
Unorganized West Timiskaming	4.7	2.9	Highway 564 east – Boston Creek	
Unorganized West Timiskaming	12.3	7.6	Highway 650 east – Dane	
Kirkland Lake	19.6	12.2	Highway 66 / TCH – Swastika, Kirkland Lake	Northern terminus
1.000 mi = 1.609 km; 1.000 km = 0.621 mi
