= List of secondary highways in Timiskaming District =

List of Ontario secondary highways

This is a list of secondary highways in Timiskaming District, most of which serve as logging roads or provide access to the isolated and sparsely populated areas in the Timiskaming District of northeastern Ontario.

== Highway 558 ==
Highway 558

Route information
- Maintained by the Ministry of Transportation of Ontario
- Length: 16.8 km (10.4 mi)

Major junctions
- West end: Montreal River at Mowat Landing
- East end: Temiskaming Shores west limits at Mowat Landing Road/Firstbrook Line Road

Location
- Country: Canada
- Province: Ontario
- Divisions: Timiskaming District
- Major cities: Button's Corners, Mowat Landing

Highway system
- Ontario provincial highways; Current; Former; 400-series
← Highway 557	→ Highway 559

Secondary Highway 558, commonly referred to as Highway 558, is a secondary highway in the Canadian province of Ontario. Located in the Timiskaming District, the highway begins at the western city limits of Temiskaming Shores, three kilometres west of Highway 11 along Mowat Landing Road. It extends westerly for 16.8 kilometres (10.4 mi), passing through the community of Button's Corners and ending at the Montreal River in the community of Mowat Landing. Some cottages and a public boat launch are at the western terminus.

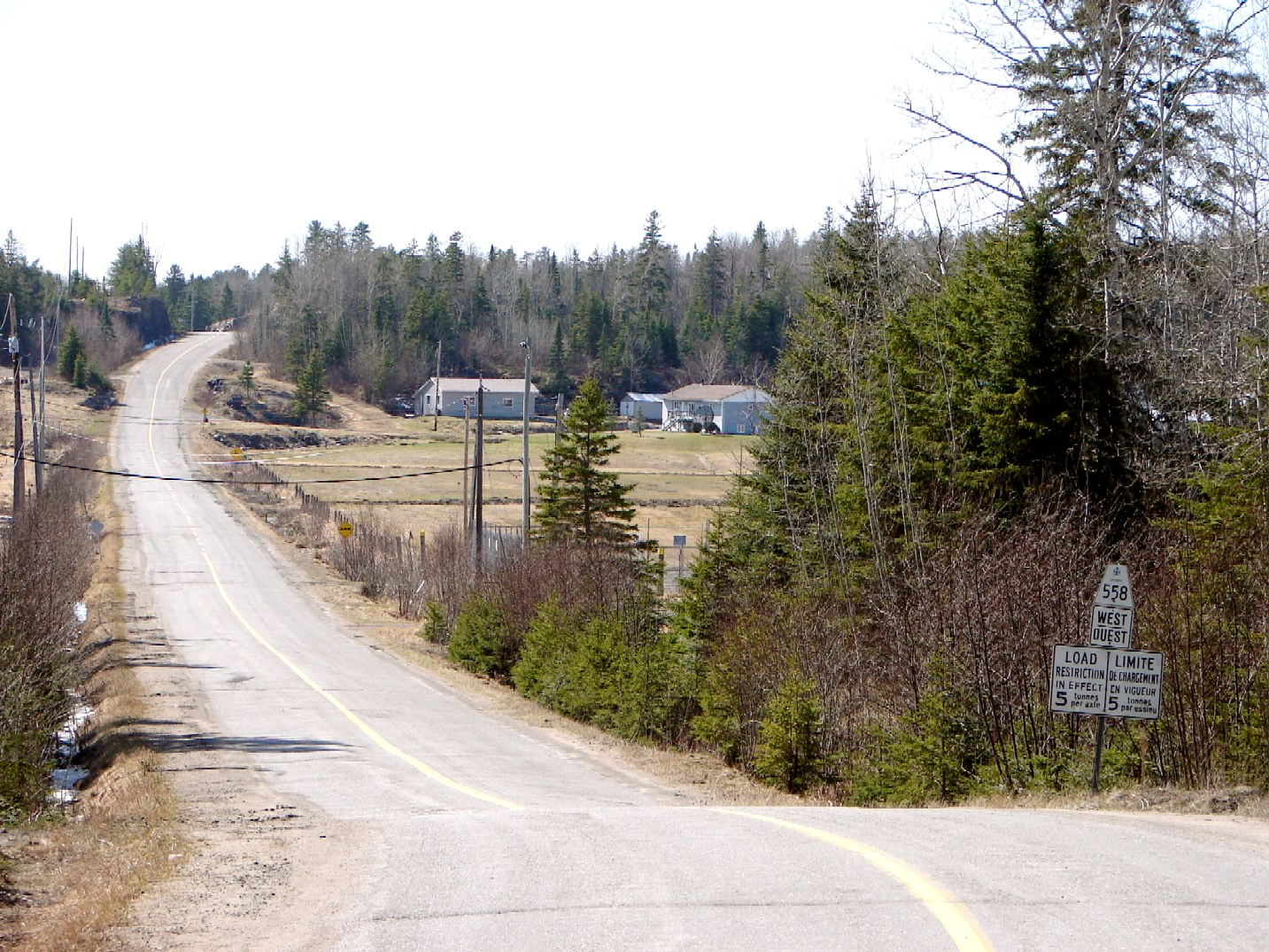
Highway 558 west of Haileybury

== Highway 562 ==
Highway 562
- Main Street (Thornloe)

Route information
- Maintained by the Ministry of Transportation of Ontario
- Length: 14.5 km (9.0 mi)

Major junctions
- Southwest end: Highway 65 at McCool
- Highway 571
- Northeast end: Highway 11 at Thornloe

Location
- Country: Canada
- Province: Ontario
- Districts: Timiskaming District
- Major cities: Kerns, Armstrong

Highway system
- Ontario provincial highways; Current; Former; 400-series
← Highway 560A	→ Highway 563

Secondary Highway 562, commonly referred to as Highway 562, is a secondary highway in the Canadian province of Ontario. Located in the Timiskaming District, the highway begins at an intersection with Highway 65 at McCool. It extends northerly for 3 kilometres (1.9 mi), and then turns easterly for 12 kilometres (7.5 mi), ending at a junction with Highway 11 just outside Thornloe.

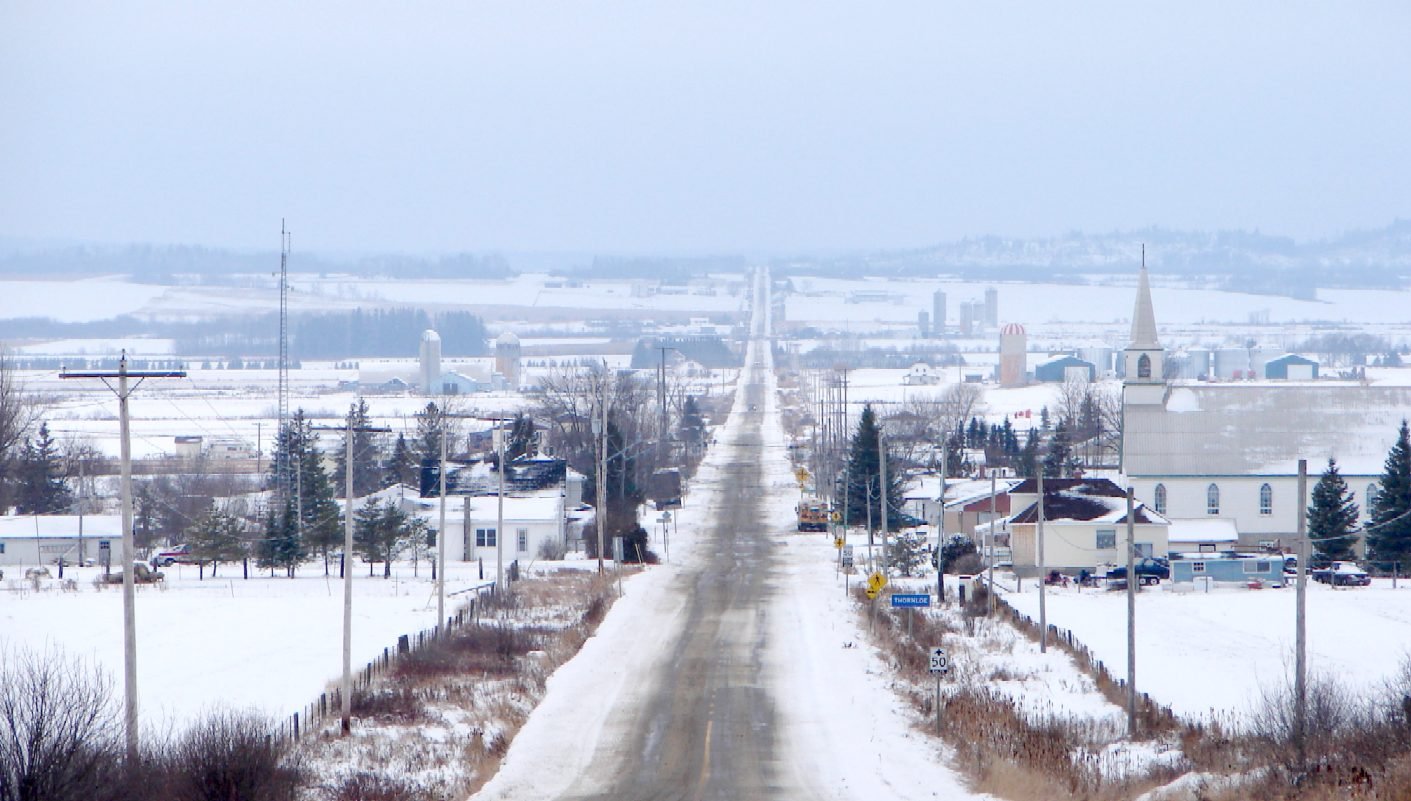
Highway 562 through Thornloe

== Highway 564 ==
Highway 564

Route information
- Maintained by the Ministry of Transportation of Ontario
- Length: 7.0 km (4.3 mi)

Major junctions
- West end: Highway 112 near Tarzwell
- East end: Boston Creek

Location
- Country: Canada
- Province: Ontario
- Districts: Timiskaming District

Highway system
- Ontario provincial highways; Current; Former; 400-series
← Highway 563	→ Highway 565

Highway 564 is a short secondary highway, which extends from Highway 112 near Tarzwell easterly for seven kilometres to the community of Boston Creek.

== Highway 566 ==
Highway 566

Route information
- Maintained by the Ministry of Transportation of Ontario
- Length: 25.9 km (16.1 mi)
- Existed: May 9, 1956–present

Major junctions
- West end: Ashley Mine
- East end: Highway 66 at Matachewan

Location
- Country: Canada
- Province: Ontario
- Districts: Timiskaming District

Highway system
- Ontario provincial highways; Current; Former; 400-series
← Highway 565	→ Highway 567

Highway 566, a westerly continuation of the primary Highway 66, extends from the Montreal River at Matachewan for 25.9 kilometres to Ashley Mine.

At Ashley Mine the roadway, although no longer designated as a provincial highway, continues for another approximately 40 kilometres (20 mi), ending at an intersection with a north–south road that extends from Highway 560 into the urban core of Timmins.

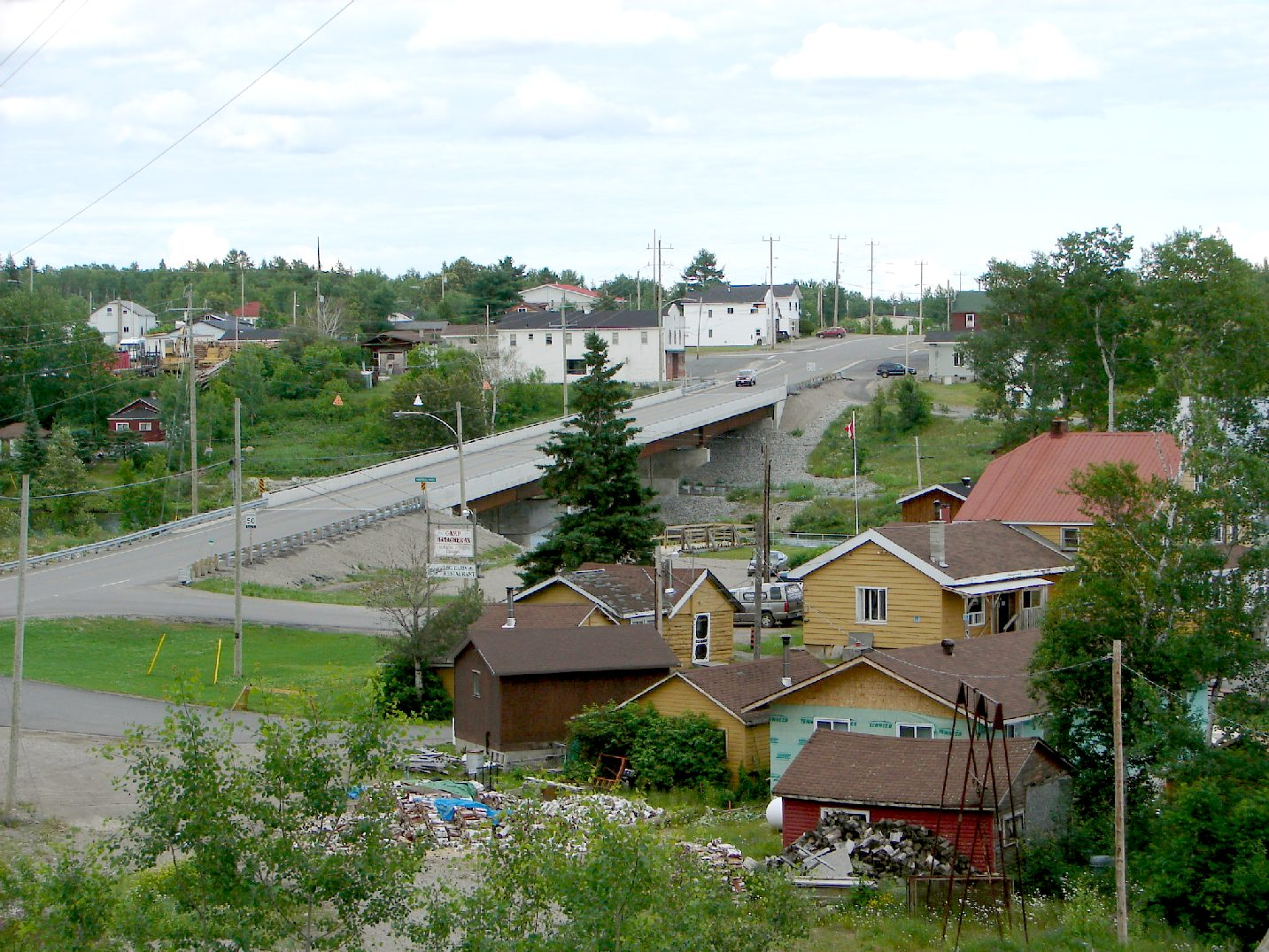
Bridge over the Montreal river that marks the end of Highway 66 and the start of Highway 566.

== Highway 567 ==
Highway 567

Route information
- Maintained by the Ministry of Transportation of Ontario
- Length: 34.5 km (21.4 mi)
- Existed: May 9, 1956–present

Major junctions
- South end: Lower Notch Dam at Montreal River and Matabitchuan River
- North end: Temiskaming Shores south limit

Location
- Country: Canada
- Province: Ontario
- Districts: Timiskaming District

Highway system
- Ontario provincial highways; Current; Former; 400-series
← Highway 566	→ Highway 568

Secondary Highway 567, commonly referred to as Highway 567, is a secondary highway in the Canadian province of Ontario, located within Timiskaming District. Commencing at a junction with King Street in the community of North Cobalt, the highway extends southerly for 34.5 kilometres (21.4 mi) to the Lower Notch power dam at the mouth of the Montreal River .

== Highway 568 ==
Highway 568

Route information
- Maintained by the Ministry of Transportation of Ontario
- Length: 2.4 km (1.5 mi)
- Existed: May 9, 1956–present

Major junctions
- West end: Highway 11 at Kenogami Lake
- East end: Kenogami Lake Station

Location
- Country: Canada
- Province: Ontario
- Districts: Timiskaming District

Highway system
- Ontario provincial highways; Current; Former; 400-series
← Highway 567	→ Highway 569

Secondary Highway 568, commonly referred to as Highway 568, is a secondary highway the Unorganized West Part of Timiskaming District in northwestern Ontario, Canada. Commencing at a junction with Ontario Highway 11 in the community of Kenogami Lake, the highway extends east for 2.4 kilometres (1.5 mi) to the crossing with the Ontario Northland Railway main line at Kenogami Lake Station.

== Highway 569 ==
Highway 569

Route information
- Maintained by the Ministry of Transportation of Ontario
- Length: 28.3 km (17.6 mi)

Major junctions
- South end: Highway 11 in Harley
- North end: Highway 11/ Highway 624 in Evanturel

Location
- Country: Canada
- Province: Ontario
- Districts: Timiskaming District

Highway system
- Ontario provincial highways; Current; Former; 400-series
← Highway 568	→ Highway 570

Secondary Highway 569, commonly referred to as Highway 569, is a secondary highway in the Canadian province of Ontario. Located within Timiskaming District, the highway spans a distance of 28.3 kilometres (17.6 mi). Commencing at a junction with Highway 11 in the township of Harley, it travels northerly for 19 kilometres (12 mi) through the communities of Couttsville and Hilliardton, then travels west for 9 kilometres (5.6 mi) through the communities of Tomstown and Heaslip to another junction with Highway 11 and Highway 624 in the township of Evanturel southeast of Englehart.

Highway 569 at intersection with Highway 624 near its northwestern terminus.

== Highway 570 ==
Highway 570

Route information
- Maintained by the Ministry of Transportation of Ontario
- Length: 4.4 km (2.7 mi)

Major junctions
- West end: Highway 11 – North Bay, Cochrane
- East end: Sesekinika

Location
- Country: Canada
- Province: Ontario
- Districts: Timiskaming District

Highway system
- Ontario provincial highways; Current; Former; 400-series
← Highway 569	→ Highway 571

Secondary Highway 570, commonly referred to as Highway 570, is a secondary highway in the Canadian province of Ontario. Located in Timiskaming District near the continental divide between the Atlantic and Arctic oceans, the highway extends from a junction with Highway 11 north of Kenogami Lake east for 4.4 kilometres (2.7 mi) to the community of Sesekinika.

== Highway 571 ==
Highway 571

Route information
- Maintained by the Ministry of Transportation of Ontario
- Length: 5.8 km (3.6 mi)

Major junctions
- South end: Highway 562 – Thornloe, Elk Lake
- Highway 640 at Earlton
- North end: Highway 11 at Earlton

Location
- Country: Canada
- Province: Ontario
- Districts: Timiskaming District
- Major cities: Armstrong

Highway system
- Ontario provincial highways; Current; Former; 400-series
← Highway 570	→ Highway 572

Secondary Highway 571, commonly referred to as Highway 571, is a secondary highway in the Canadian province of Ontario. Located in Timiskaming District, the highway extends from a junction near the midpoint of Highway 562 northerly for 5.8 kilometres (3.6 mi) to a junction with Highway 11 at Earlton.

== Highway 573 ==
Highway 573

Route information
- Maintained by Ministry of Transportation of Ontario
- Length: 19.7 km (12.2 mi)

Major junctions
- South end: Highway 560 at Charlton
- North end: Highway 11 – North Bay, Cochrane

Location
- Country: Canada
- Province: Ontario
- Districts: Timiskaming District
- Major cities: Charlton, Ontario

Highway system
- Ontario provincial highways; Current; Former; 400-series
← Highway 572	→ Highway 574

Secondary Highway 573, commonly referred to as Highway 573, is a secondary highway in the Canadian province of Ontario. Its total length is approximately 19.3 kilometres (12.0 mi). Its northern terminus is Highway 11, and its southern terminus is at Highway 560 in Charlton.

== Highway 624 ==
Highway 624

Route information
- Maintained by the Ministry of Transportation of Ontario
- Length: 41.8 km (26.0 mi)
- Existed: September 15, 1960.–present

Major junctions
- South end: Highway 11 / Highway 569 / TCH in Evanturel
- North end: Highway 66 / TCH in Larder Lake

Location
- Country: Canada
- Province: Ontario
- Districts: Timiskaming District

Highway system
- Ontario provincial highways; Current; Former; 400-series
← Highway 623	→ Highway 625

Secondary Highway 624, commonly referred to as Highway 624, is a secondary highway in the Canadian province of Ontario. Located within Timiskaming District, the highway spans a distance of 41.8 kilometres (26.0 mi) from a junction with Highway 11 and Highway 569 in the township of Evanturel to a junction with Highway 66 in Larder Lake, passing through the community of Marter about 10 kilometres (6 mi) north of the south end. Another Highway 624 existed in the mid-to-late 1950s west of Timmins, connecting Highway 616 with Foleyet; Highway 101 eventually assumed this route. The current Highway 624 was assumed on September 15, 1960.

Highway 624 at Marter

== Highway 640 ==
Highway 640
- Airport Road

Route information
- Maintained by the Ministry of Transportation of Ontario
- Length: 3 km (1.9 mi)
- Existed: September 27, 1963–February 25, 2004

Major junctions
- Southwest end: Earlton-Timiskaming Regional Airport
- Northeast end: Highway 571 at Earlton

Location
- Country: Canada
- Province: Ontario
- Districts: Timiskaming District
- Major cities: Armstrong

Highway system
- Ontario provincial highways; Current; Former; 400-series
← Highway 639	→ Highway 641

Secondary Highway 640, commonly referred to as Highway 640, was a secondary highway in the Canadian province of Ontario, which extended for three kilometres from a junction with Highway 571 in Earlton to the Earlton-Timiskaming Regional Airport. It was two lanes wide and paved in its entirety.

== Highway 650 ==
Highway 650

Route information
- Maintained by the Ministry of Transportation of Ontario
- Length: 7.6 km (4.7 mi)
- Existed: April 1, 1964–present

Major junctions
- West end: Highway 112 in Dane
- East end: Adams Mine site

Location
- Country: Canada
- Province: Ontario
- Districts: Timiskaming

Highway system
- Ontario provincial highways; Current; Former; 400-series
← Highway 649	→ Highway 651

Secondary Highway 650, commonly referred to as Highway 650, is a provincially maintained highway in the Canadian province of Ontario. The highway is 7.6 kilometres (4.7 mi) in length, connecting Highway 112 in Dane with the now abandoned Adams Mine site. The route was designated in 1964, shortly after the mine opened. It is sparsely travelled, but paved throughout its length.
