= Ontario Highway 650 =

Ontario provincial highway

Highway 650

Route information
- Maintained by the Ministry of Transportation of Ontario
- Length: 7.6 km (4.7 mi)
- Existed: April 1, 1964–present

Major junctions
- West end: Highway 112 in Dane
- East end: ONR crossing at Adams Mine

Location
- Country: Canada
- Province: Ontario
- Districts: Timiskaming

Highway system
- Ontario provincial highways; Current; Former; 400-series
← Highway 647	→ Highway 651
Former provincial highways
← Highway 649

Secondary Highway 650, commonly referred to as Highway 650, is a provincially maintained highway in the Canadian province of Ontario. The highway is 7.6 kilometres (4.7 mi) in length, connecting Highway 112 in Dane with the now abandoned Adams Mine site. The route was designated in 1964, shortly after the mine opened. It is sparsely travelled, but paved throughout its length.

== Route description ==
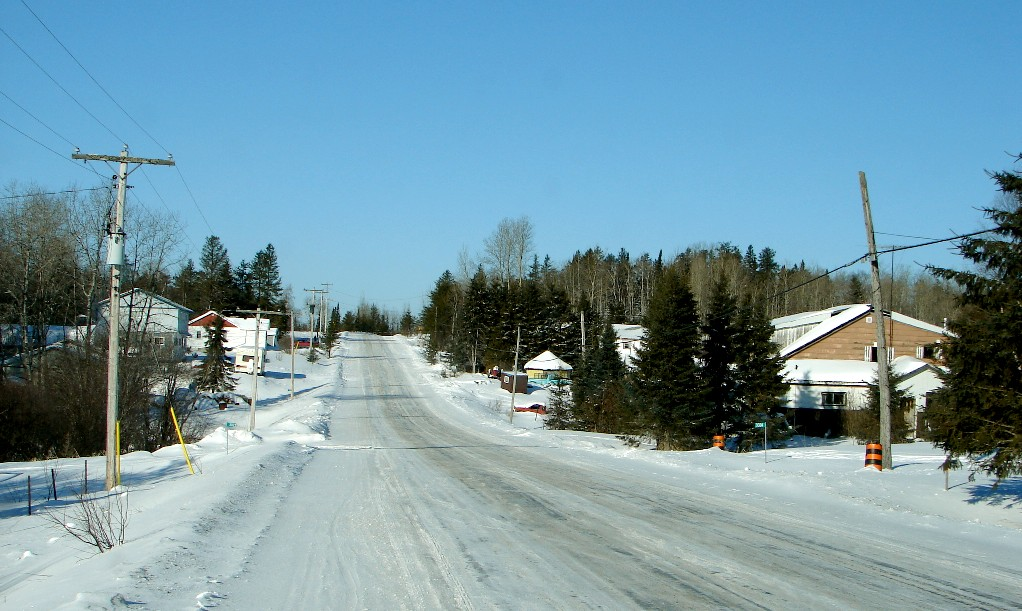
Highway 650 through the community of Dane

Highway 650 begins in the west at Highway 112, travelling southeast through the community of Dane. It passes several residences and turns east. The highway exits the community and crosses the Ontario Northland Railway (ONR), east of which the road is sparsely travelled. It zig-zags southeast through dense forest. After crossing a swamp, the highway curves to the northeast and passes beneath two high-tension transmission lines. It then curves to the south, crossing a spur of the ONR built to serve the mine, after which the road is privately maintained. The entire length of the route is paved.

== History ==
Highway 650 was designated on April 1, 1964, following an access road to the newly opened mine east from Dane. The route was gravel-surfaced at the time; it was paved in its entirety by mid-1967. The route has remained unchanged since then. Despite the closure of the mine in 1990, the road remained a provincial route through the 1997 and 1998 highway transfers; its annual average daily traffic is 30 vehicles, the second lowest of any provincially maintained highway.

== Major intersections ==
The following table lists the major junctions along Highway 650, as noted by the Ministry of Transportation of Ontario. The entire route is located in Timiskaming District.

Location	km	mi	Destinations	Notes
Dane	0.0	0.0	Highway 112 – Englehart, Kirkland Lake	
West Unorganized Timiskaming District	7.6	4.7	Adams Mine site	Highway ends at Ontario Northland Railway crossing
1.000 mi = 1.609 km; 1.000 km = 0.621 mi
