= Paradis Bay, Ontario =

Coordinates: 47°20′0″N 79°31′58″W

Paradis Bay is an unincorporated community in the Canadian province of Ontario, located within the Unorganized, West Part division of Timiskaming District. It was originally settled by Father Charles Alfred Paradis in 1882, as a model farm for future colonization prospects on Upper Lake Timiskaming. The community is located along a rural road off Highway 567, south of Cobalt and near Lorrain Valley.

Situated on the shores of the lake in Lorrain Township, within two decades nearly 10 farms scattered the area around the bay. A regular steamer stop was established, and a small wharf constructed to ship out and receive goods. With the modest but steady activity a post office was also established in 1915, but closed four years later in 1919.

The little settlement dispersed gradually and nothing remained by the 1950s, and today cottages dot the shoreline where at one time a small scattering of fields lay.
