= Gauthier, Ontario =

Gauthier
- Township municipality (single-tier)
- Township of Gauthier
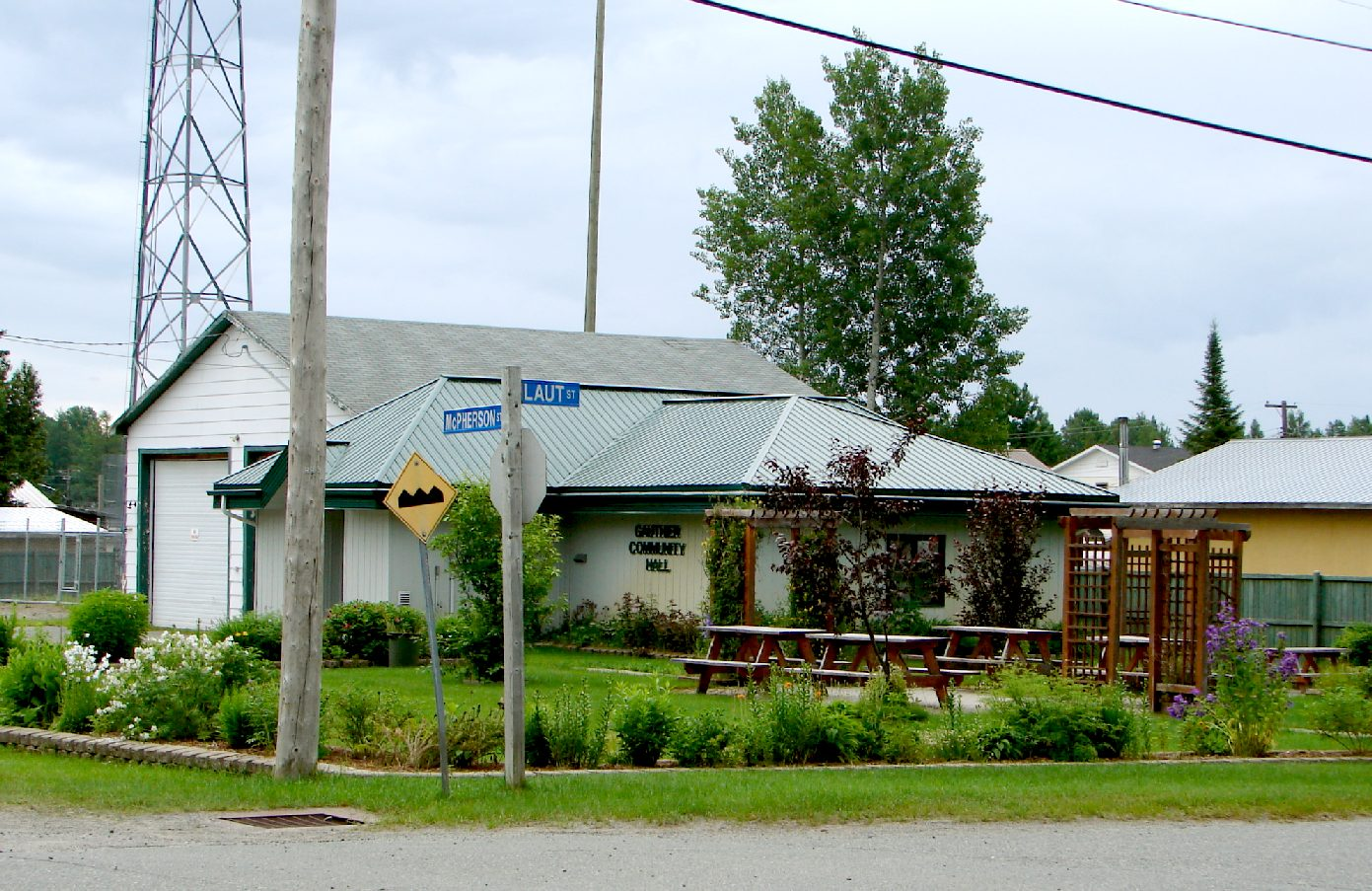
- Gauthier Community Hall in Dobie

- Location in Ontario
- Coordinates: 48°08′45″N 79°49′21″W
- Country: Canada
- Province: Ontario
- Region: Northeastern Ontario
- District: Timiskaming
- Incorporated: 1945

Government
  - Type: Township
  - Reeve: Paul Binnendyk
  - Fed. riding: Kapuskasing—Timmins—Mushkegowuk
  - Prov. riding: Timiskaming—Cochrane

Area
  - Land: 87.98 km^{2} (33.97 sq mi)

Population (2021)
  - Total: 151
  - Density: 1.7/km^{2} (4.4/sq mi)
- Time zone: UTC-5 (Eastern Time Zone)
  - Summer (DST): UTC-4 (Eastern Daylight Time)
- Postal code: P0K 1B0
- Area codes: 705, 249

Gauthier is a township municipality in Timiskaming District the Northeastern Ontario, Canada. Its main population centre is Dobie, located just north of Highway 66, 18.5 kilometres (11.5 mi) east of Kirkland Lake.

== History ==
Gauthier was incorporated in 1945 as an Improvement District, and later as a township.

Dobie housed the miners working the Upper Canada Mines, which produced 4,648,984 ounces of gold before closing in 1971.

== Demographics ==
In the 2021 Census of Population conducted by Statistics Canada, Gauthier had a population of 151 living in 68 of its 73 total private dwellings, a change of 9.4% from its 2016 population of 138. With a land area of 87.98 km^{2} (33.97 sq mi), it had a population density of 1.7/km^{2} (4.4/sq mi) in 2021.

Canada census – Gauthier community profile

| | 2021 | 2016 | 2011 |
| Population | 151 (+9.4% from 2016) | 138 (12.2% from 2011) | 123 (-7.5% from 2006) |
| Land area | 87.98 km^{2} (33.97 sq mi) | 88.41 km^{2} (34.14 sq mi) | 88.59 km^{2} (34.20 sq mi) |
| Population density | 1.7/km^{2} (4.4/sq mi) | 1.6/km^{2} (4.1/sq mi) | 1.4/km^{2} (3.6/sq mi) |
| Median age | 49.2 (M: 50.0, F: 47.6) | 50.0 (M: 51.5, F: 48.0) | 45.9 (M: 46.5, F: 45.7) |
| Private dwellings | 73 (total) 68 (occupied) | 79 (total) | 69 (total) |
| Median household income | $ n/a | $72,576 |

References: 2021 2016 2011

Historical census populations – Gauthier, Ontario

| Year | Pop. | ±% |
|---|---|---|
| 1921 | 31 | — |
| 1931 | 22 | −29.0% |
| 1941 | 258 | +1072.7% |
| 1951 | 269 | +4.3% |
| 1956 | 250 | −7.1% |
| 1961 | 297 | +18.8% |

| Year | Pop. | ±% |
|---|---|---|
| 1966 | 248 | −16.5% |
| 1971 | 201 | −19.0% |
| 1976 | 188 | −6.5% |
| 1981 | 146 | −22.3% |
| 1986 | 152 | +4.1% |
| 1991 | 149 | −2.0% |

| Year | Pop. | ±% |
|---|---|---|
| 1996 | 152 | +2.0% |
| 2001 | 128 | −15.8% |
| 2006 | 133 | +3.9% |
| 2011 | 123 | −7.5% |
| 2016 | 138 | +12.2% |
| 2021 | 151 | +9.4% |

Source: Statistics Canada

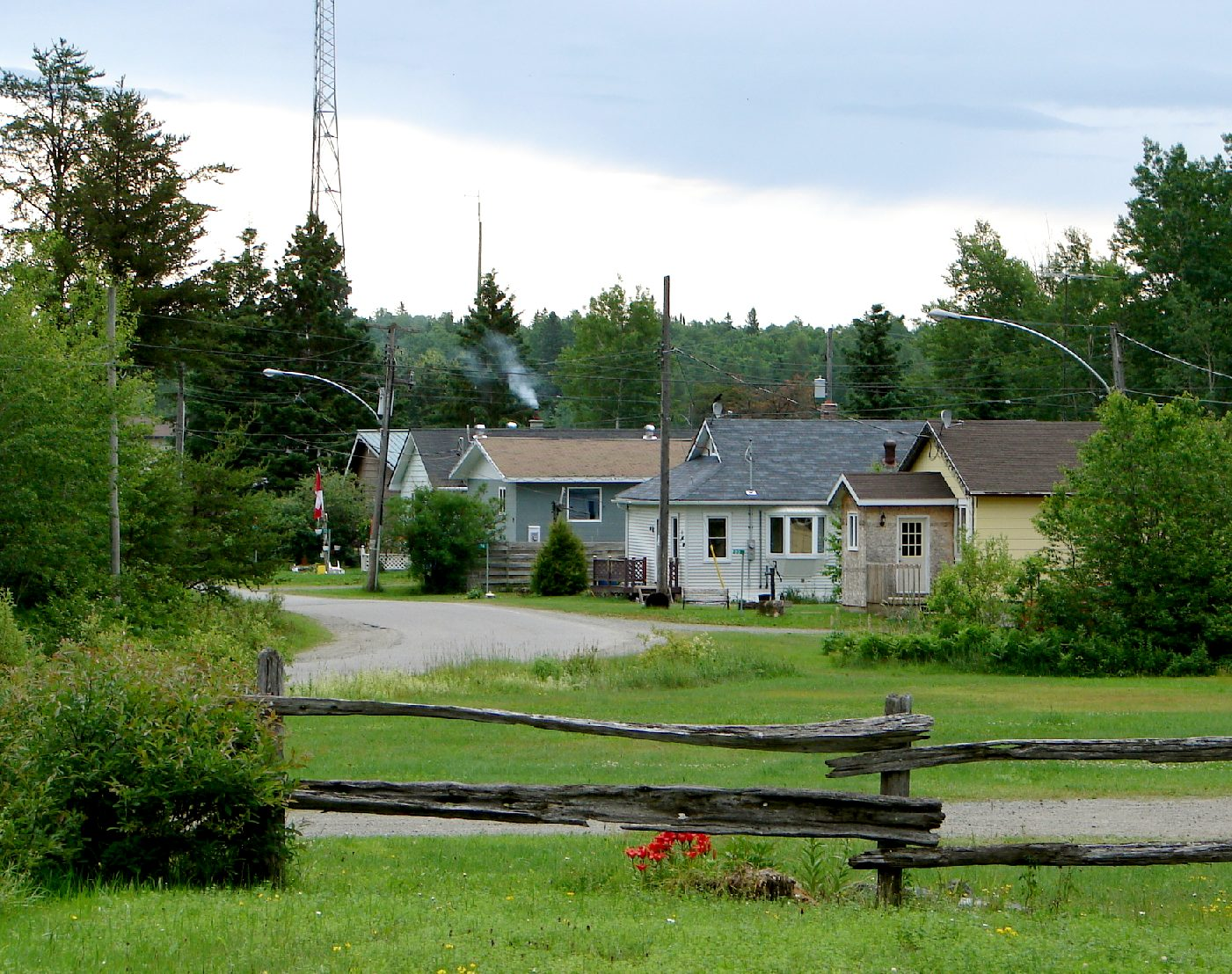
Dobie

Mother tongue (2021):

- English as first language: 76.7%
- French as first language: 16.7%
- English and French as first languages: 0%
- Other as first language: 3.3%

== Transportation ==
Gauthier is served by two provincial highways:

- Highway 66 running west to Kirkland Lake and Highway 11, and east to the Quebec border, where it continues as Quebec Route 117. Highway 66 is part of the Trans-Canada Highway between highway 11 and the Quebec border.
- Highway 672, running north from Highway 66 past Northlands Park to Esker Lakes Provincial Park and then to Ontario Highway 101.

The township is traversed in an east–west direction by the Nipissing Central Railway line that runs between Swastika (Ontario) and Rouyn-Noranda (Quebec). The line continues to be operated, as a subsidiary of the Ontario Northland Railway, as a freight spur.

=== Railway ===
The railway point of Northlands Park (48°08′40″N 79°51′46″W, elevation 351 metres (1,152 ft)), is in Gauthier. It is adjacent to Highway 672, 1.5 kilometres (0.93 mi) north of that highway's southern terminus at Highway 66, and 3.7 kilometres (2.3 mi) west of Dobie.

Northlands Park was established in the 1920s at the construction of the Nipissing Central Railway line between Swastika (Ontario) and Rouyn-Noranda (Quebec) at mile 14.1. The line continues to be operated, as a subsidiary of the Ontario Northland Railway, as a freight spur.

== Notable people ==
Actress Sara Botsford was born in Dobie.

== See also ==
- List of townships in Ontario
- List of francophone communities in Ontario
