= Ontario Highway 672 =

Ontario provincial highway

Highway 672

Route information
- Maintained by the Ministry of Transportation of Ontario
- Length: 47.6 km (29.6 mi)
- Existed: 1990–present

Major junctions
- South end: Highway 101
- North end: Highway 66

Location
- Country: Canada
- Province: Ontario
- Districts: Timiskaming; Cochrane
- Towns: Northlands Park

Highway system
- Ontario provincial highways; Current; Former; 400-series
← Highway 671	→ Highway 673

Secondary Highway 672, commonly referred to as Highway 672, is a provincially maintained secondary highway in the Canadian province of Ontario. The 47.6-kilometre (29.6 mi) route is located within the Timiskaming and Cochrane and connects Highway 66 — part of the Trans-Canada Highway — in the south with Highway 101 in the north. It is the only highway that provides access to Esker Lakes Provincial Park. Although the highway was first assumed by the province in 1990, the existing road had been built north from Highway 66 to the provincial park in 1977 and extended to Highway 101 in the late 1980s.

== Route description ==
Southern terminus of Highway 672 at Highway 66

Highway 672 begins at a junction with Highway 66, part of the Trans-Canada Highway, east of Kirkland Lake. It proceeds north past the Timiskaming–Cochrane District boundary, traveling through Esker Lakes Provincial Park and providing the only road access to it. The route ends at Highway 101, approximately 50 kilometres (31 mi) east of Matheson and 23 kilometres (14 mi) west of the Quebec border.

Like other provincial routes in Ontario, Highway 672 is maintained by the Ministry of Transportation of Ontario. In 2010, traffic surveys conducted by the ministry showed that on average, 280 vehicles used the highway daily along the section near Highway 66, while 150 vehicles did so each day along the section near Highway 101. These counts represent the highest and lowest traffic volume along the highway, respectively.

== History ==
Highway 672 was built from an access road that traveled north from Highway 66 to Esker Lakes Provincial Park, which existed as early as 1977. Between 1986 and 1988, this road was extended north through the park and beyond to meet Highway 101. By 1990, the road was given the Highway 672 designation and appears for the first time on the 1990 Official Road Map as a paved road. However, it does not appear in the 1989 Highway Distance Table published eight months earlier. The route has remained unchanged since.

== Major intersections ==
The following table lists the major junctions along Highway 672, as noted by the Ministry of Transportation of Ontario.

Division	Location	km	mi	Destinations	Notes
Timiskaming	Gauthier	0.0	0.0	Highway 66 – Kirkland Lake, Rouyn–Noranda	Trans-Canada Highway
Cochrane		47.6	29.6	Highway 101 – Timmins	
1.000 mi = 1.609 km; 1.000 km = 0.621 mi
