= Marshall's Corner =

Marshall's Corner, Marshalls Corner, Marshall's Corners or Marshalls Corners can refer to:

- Marshall's Corners, Ontario, Canada
- Marshalls Corner, New Jersey, United States
