= Kenogami =

Kenogami or Kénogami may refer to:

- Kenogami Lake, Saguenay–Lac-Saint-Jean, Quebec, Canada
- Kenogami Lake, Ontario, a community in Timiskaming District, Ontario, Canada
- Kenogami River, Northern Ontario, Canada
- HMCS Kenogami, a Flower-class corvette of the Royal Canadian Navy
- Kénogami, a town now amalgamated into Jonquière, Quebec, Canada
