= Boston Creek =

Community in Ontario, Canada

Coordinates: 48°00′40″N 79°56′15″W

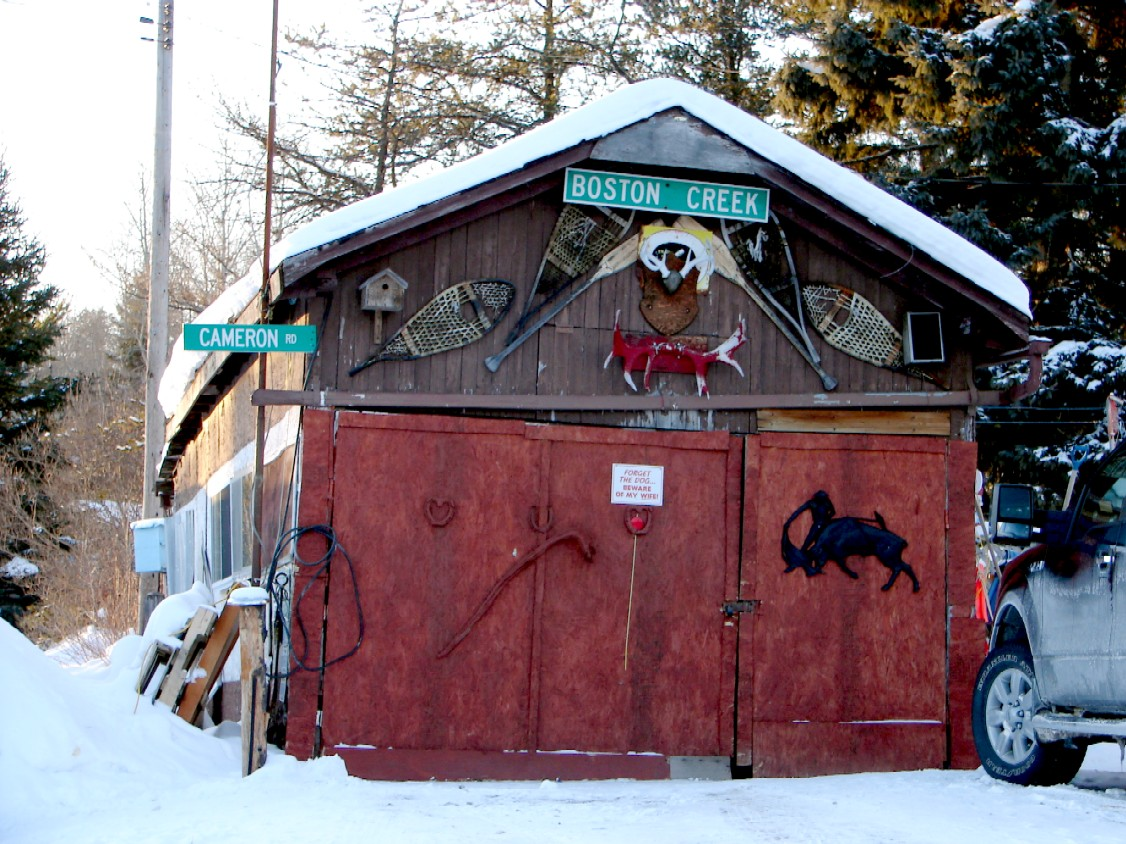
Decorated garage in Boston Creek

Boston Creek is an unincorporated community in the Canadian province of Ontario, located within the Unorganized West Part division of Timiskaming District.

Willet Miller discovered gold in 1900 and claims were staked in 1906. The Barry-Hollinger Mine operated until 1946, producing 77,000 ounces of gold.

Iron deposits were discovered in 1904 by the Temiskaming and Hudson Bay Company.

The community is located along the Ontario Northland Railway at the eastern terminus of Highway 564, several kilometres east of Tarzwell.
