= Ontario Highway 66 =

Ontario provincial highway

Highway 66
- Highway 66 highlighted in red

Route information
- Maintained by the Ministry of Transportation of Ontario
- Length: 103.5 km (64.3 mi)
- Existed: September 22, 1937–present

Major junctions
- West end: Highway 566 in Matachewan
- Highway 65 near Matachewan; Highway 11 near Kirkland Lake; Highway 112 in Kirkland Lake
- East end: R-117 (TCH) towards Rouyn-Noranda, Quebec

Location
- Country: Canada
- Province: Ontario

Highway system
- Ontario provincial highways; Current; Former; 400-series
← Highway 65	→ Highway 67

King's Highway 66, commonly referred to as Highway 66, is a provincially maintained highway in the Canadian province of Ontario. Located in the Timiskaming District, the highway begins at Matachewan near a junction with Highway 65. It extends eastward for 107.0 kilometres (66.5 mi) to the Quebec boundary just east of Kearns. At the provincial boundary, the highway continues eastward as Route 117. From Highway 11 (41 kilometres (25 mi) east of Matachewan) at Kenogami Lake eastwards to the Quebec boundary, Highway 66 is designated as part of the Trans-Canada Highway.

== Route description ==
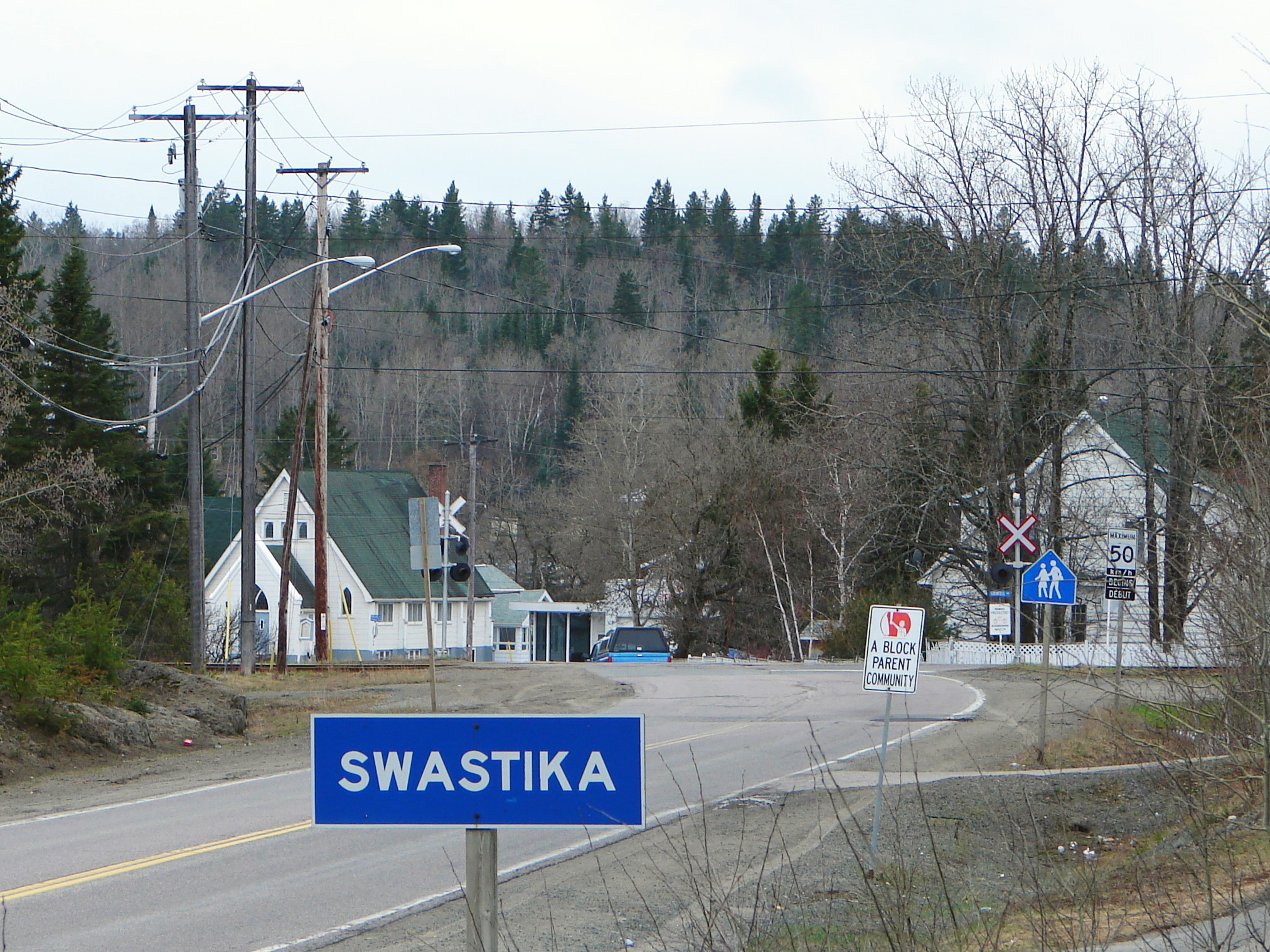
Highway 66 passes through the controversially named community of Swastika

Beginning at the village of Matachewan, where the highway continues west as Highway 566, the route travels 4.6 kilometres (2.9 mi) east to a junction with Highway 65. From there to the community of Kenogami Lake, on Highway 11, the highway passes through a 40-kilometre (25 mi) wilderness, encountering few roads or signs of humanity. Instead the highway winds through rock cuts, muskeg and thick coniferous forests. After intersecting Highway 11, the route continues east through the controversially named community of Swastika. It encounters Highway 112 between Swastika and the community of Chaput Hughes, after which the highway enters the town of Kirkland Lake. East of the town, Highway 66 passes through King Kirkland and encounters Highway 672.

Highway 66 returns to a remote setting, eventually passing through the community of Larder Lake, where it encounters Highway 624. For the remaining 17 kilometres (11 mi), the route snakes through the wilderness, passing through the communities of Virginiatown and Kearns between long segments of the forest. Immediately east of Kearns, the highway crosses the Ontario–Quebec boundary, where it continues as Quebec Route 117 to Rouyn-Noranda.

The entirety of Highway 66 is located within Timiskaming District in the rugged and remote Canadian Shield. Outside the communities along the route, there is almost no habitation or services. Consequently, traffic volumes drop considerably east of Highway 11.

== History ==
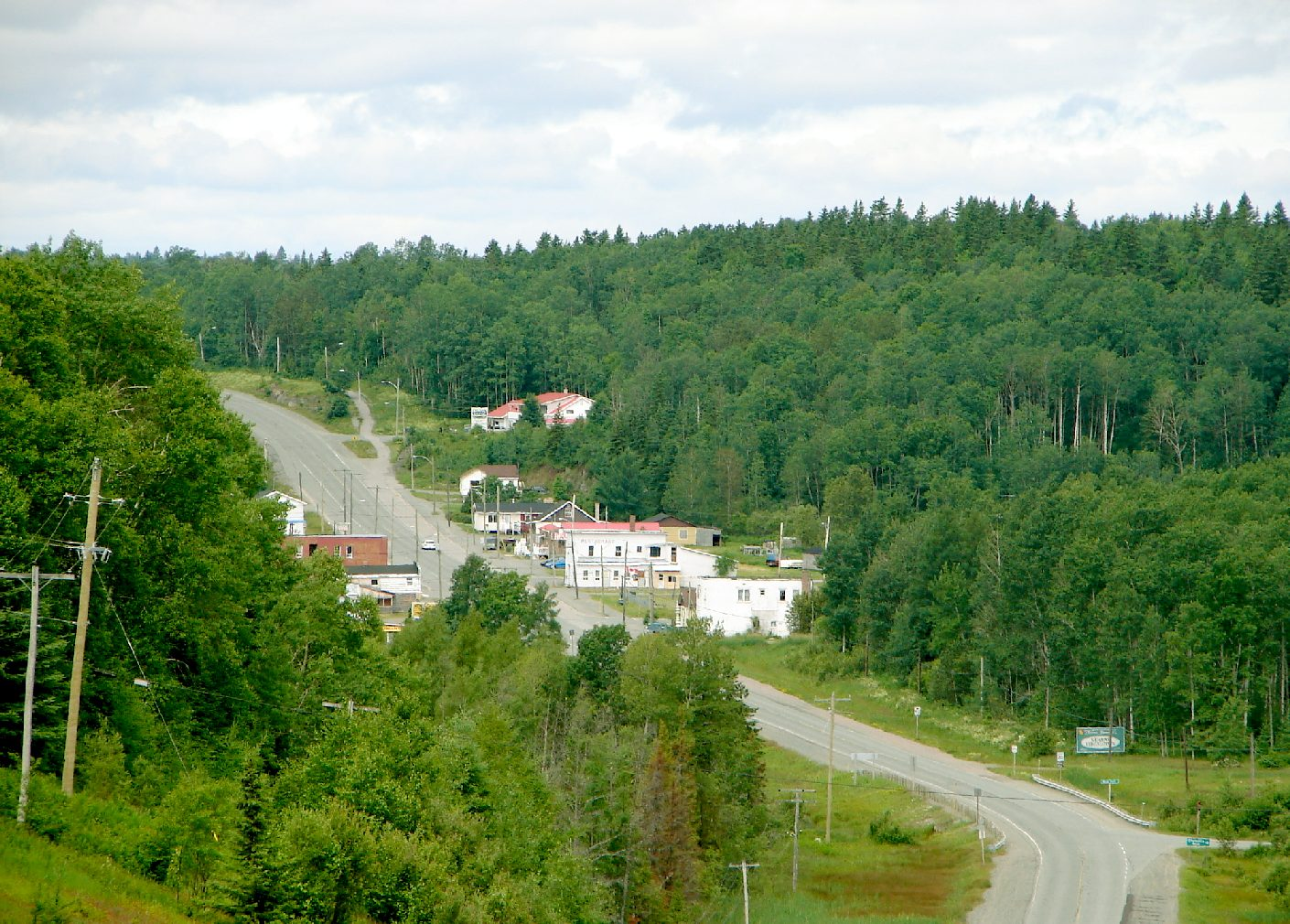
Highway 66 through Kearns

Highway 66 was first assumed by the Department of Highways on September 22, 1937, shortly after its merger with the Department of Northern Development (DND) on April 1. The DND created the road during the early 1930s, connecting several rail stops. The Kirkland Lake area is the site of several gold deposits that were discovered during the first quarter of the century, and the King's Highway status brought about new improvements to help service the mines. Initially, the route was only 26.2 miles (42.2 km) long, connecting Kirkland Lake with the Ontario–Quebec boundary. On November 16, 1955, the route was extended 25.5 miles (41.0 km) west to Highway 65 near Matachewan. Although several minor realignments to improve the rugged route have been made since then, it did not change significantly between 1956 and 1997. On April 1, 1997, a 1.9-kilometre (1.2 mi) section of the highway, between Goldthorpe Drive and Main Street, was transferred to the town of Kirkland Lake.

Beginning in August 2011, the Ministry of Transportation of Ontario undertook the Virginiatown Relocation Study to determine a new location around the town and bypass the abandoned Kerr Addison Mine. Construction was announced in 2015 and was completed sometime before the end of 2017.

== Major intersections ==
The following table lists the major junctions along Highway 66, as noted by the Ministry of Transportation of Ontario. The entire route is located in Timiskaming District.

Location	km	mi	Destinations	Notes
Matachewan	0.0	0.0	Highway 566 west	Western terminus; continues as Highway 566
Matachewan	4.6	2.9	Highway 65 south – Elk Lake	
Unorganized West Timiskaming	44.8	27.8	Highway 11 / TCH – North Bay, Cochrane	Trans-Canada Highway designation begins
Kirkland Lake	54.0	33.6	Highway 112 south – North Bay	
Kirkland Lake	57.1	35.5	Goldthorpe Drive	Highway 66 ends
Kirkland Lake	Highway 66 is discontinuous for 1.9 km (1.2 mi) through Kirkland Lake			
Kirkland Lake	59.0	36.7	Main Street	Highway 66 resumes; beginning of Kirkland Lake Connecting Link agreement
Kirkland Lake	61.0	37.9		Kirkland Lake city limits; end of Kirkland Lake Connecting Link agreement
Unorganized West Timiskaming	73.6	45.7	Highway 672 north	
Larder Lake	86.4	53.7	Highway 624 south (Ontario Street)	
Unorganized West Timiskaming	103.5	64.3	R-117 (TCH) east – Rouyn-Noranda	Continuation into Quebec
1.000 mi = 1.609 km; 1.000 km = 0.621 mi: Closed/former; Route transition

== See also ==
- Golden Highway

Trans-Canada Highway
Previous route Highway 11	Highway 66	Next route QC Route 117
