= Marshall's Corners, Ontario =

Marshall's Corners
- Location in Ontario
- Coordinates: 47°49′38″N 79°39′10″W
- Country: Canada
- Province: Ontario
- District: Timiskaming
- Part: Unorganized West

Government
  - MP: Pauline Rochefort
  - MPP: John Vanthof
- Elevation: 235 m (771 ft)
- Time zone: UTC-5 (Eastern Time Zone)
  - Summer (DST): UTC-4 (Eastern Time Zone)
- Postal code FSA: P0J
- Area codes: 705, 249

Marshall's Corners is an unincorporated place and community in geographic Ingram Township in the Unorganized West Part of Timiskaming District in northeastern Ontario, Canada. It is located on Concession Road 5, several kilometres northeast of Tomstown.
