= Canada Highways Act =

1919 act of the Dominion Parliament of Canada

Parliament of Canada
- Long title: An Act to continue the National Transportation Agency as the Canadian Transportation Agency, to consolidate and revise the National Transportation Act, 1987 and the Railway Act and to amend or repeal other Acts as a consequence
- Citation: S.C. 1996, c. 10
- Royal assent: 29 May, 1996
- Status: Current legislation

The Canada Highways Act was a 1919 act of the Dominion Parliament of Canada. The Act established a fund to support the construction of provincial highways as part of the post-World War I reconstruction program of Robert Borden's Union government.

== Background ==
In the mid-nineteenth century, the primary modes of transportation were rail and waterways, and authority over them was granted to the federal government under Canada's Constitution; roads were thought of as a local concern and were delegated to the provinces. As the automobile rose in prominence in the early 20th century, organizations such as the Good Roads Movement and local motor clubs put pressure on governments to provide improved roads. Several provinces established their own highway authorities to coordinate the development of regional road networks. The federal government's first effort to fund highway construction came with the Railway Grade Crossing Fund in 1907.

Robert Borden's Conservative government first proposed a federal assistance program for provincial road construction in 1913, but the program was rejected by the Liberal-dominated Senate over opposition to acting in an area of provincial jurisdiction. Interest in road funding was put aside during World War I, however automobile interest groups (including the 1915 establishment of the Canadian Automobile Association) maintained pressure on the federal government. Following the war, Borden's Union government established a reconstruction program including the Canada Highways Act, which passed in 1919.

== Highways funding ==
The Act established a fund to provide financial assistance to provincial highway projects, with an emphasis on encouraging interprovincial highway connections. The fund, administered by the Department of Railways and Canals, provided a maximum of $20 million to approved projects between 1 April 1919 and 31 March 1924. To qualify for funding, a province was required to develop a five-year provincial highways plan, including primary and secondary designations. Upon approval, the Dominion fund would subsidize 40% of the cost of construction.

Work on provincial highways proceeded more slowly than anticipated. The fund was not depleted as of the expiry date in 1924, and so the deadline was extended to 31 March 1928. A report prepared by the Department showed that the fund contributed $19,596,388 toward $48,990,092 of provincial road construction, funding 8,415 miles (13,543 km) of roads in all nine provinces then existing.^{[a]}

== See also ==
- Trans-Canada Highway
- National Highway System
- Prince Edward Island automobile ban

== Notes ==
^{[a]} Newfoundland and Labrador did not become part of Canada until 1949.
