= Kenogami Lake, Ontario =

Kenogami Lake
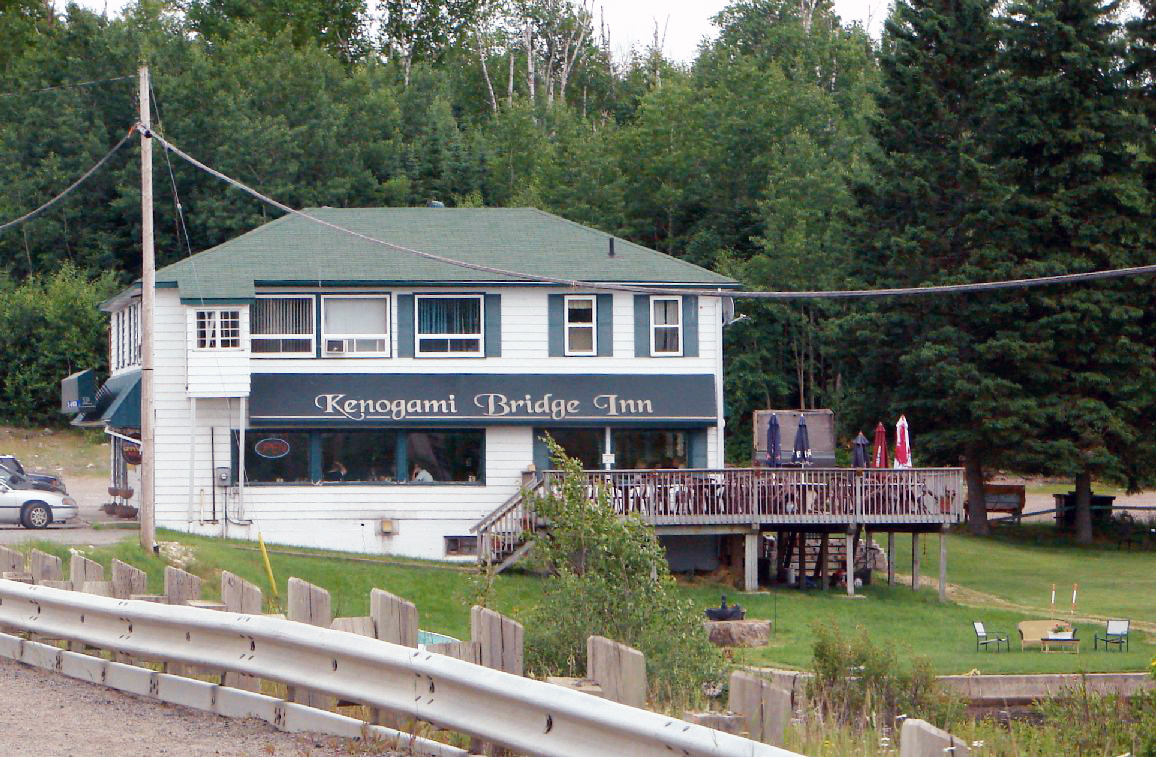
- Kenogami Bridge Inn, on the shore of Kenogami Lake

- Location of Kenogami Lake in Ontario
- Coordinates: 48°06′15″N 80°12′02″W
- Country: Canada
- Province: Ontario
- Region: Northeastern Ontario
- District: Timiskaming
- Part: Timiskaming, Unorganized, West
- Elevation: 304 m (997 ft)
- Time zone: UTC-5 (Eastern Time Zone)
  - Summer (DST): UTC-4 (Eastern Time Zone)
- Postal code FSA: P0K
- Area codes: 705, 249

Kenogami Lake is an unincorporated community in the Unorganized West Part of Timiskaming District in northeastern Ontario, Canada. It is located on Kenogami Lake on the Blanche River in the Saint Lawrence River drainage basin.

== Transportation ==
The community is located on Ontario Highway 11 (at this point part of the Trans-Canada Highway), at the junction with Ontario Highway 568, just north of the junction with Ontario Highway 66.
