= Dane, Ontario =

Community in Ontario, Canada

Coordinates: 48.067°N 80.017°W

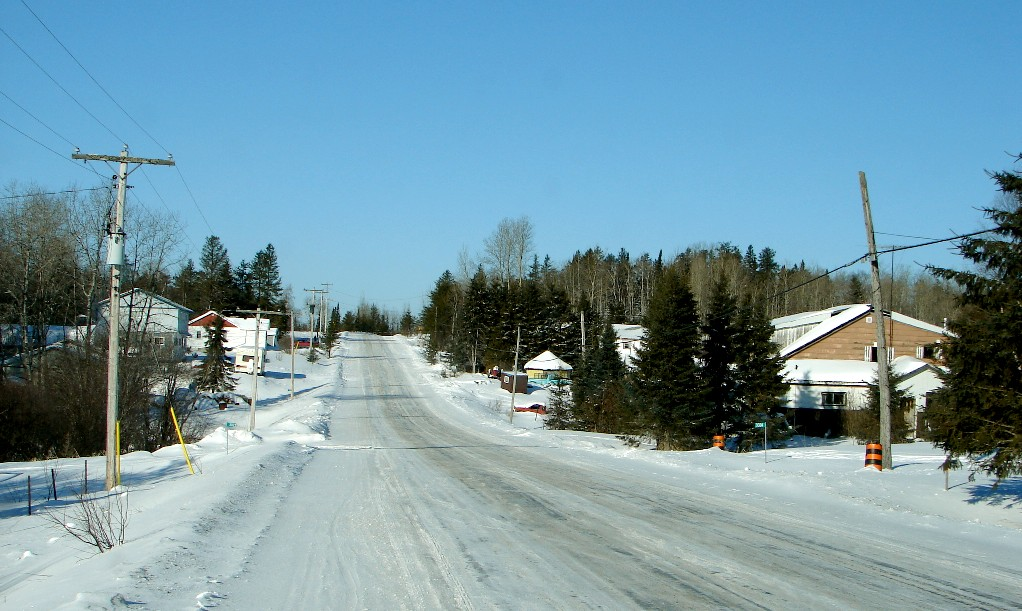
Highway 650 through Dane

Dane is an unincorporated community in the Canadian province of Ontario, located within the Unorganized, West Part, division of Timiskaming District. Dane is near the town Kirkland Lake.

The community is spread along Highway 650 and along Highway 112 at the intersection of these two roads.
