= Armstrong, Ontario =

Township in Ontario, Canada

Armstrong
- Township (single-tier)
- Township of Armstrong
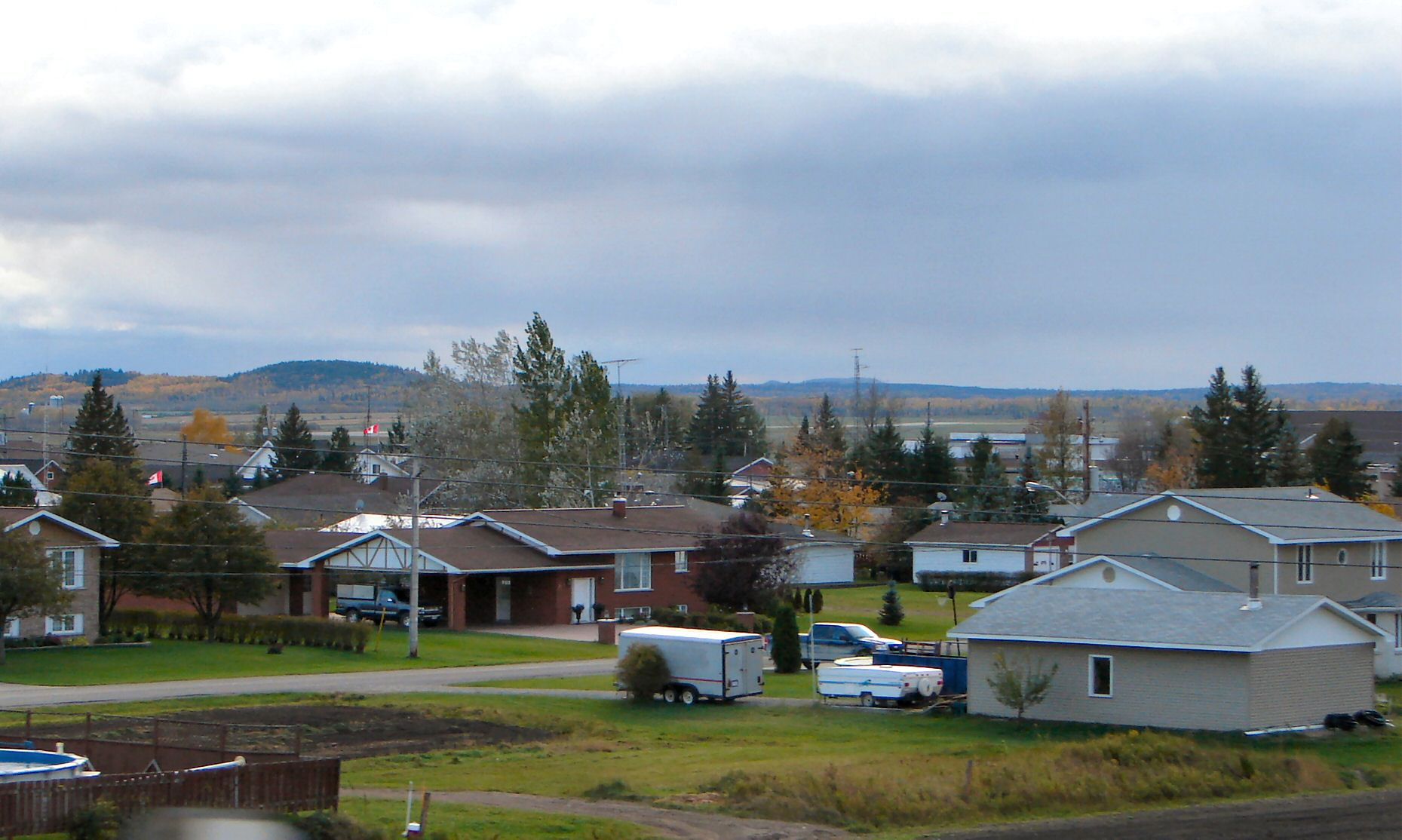
- Earlton

- Location within Ontario
- Coordinates: 47°42′40″N 79°49′28″W
- Country: Canada
- Province: Ontario
- District: Timiskaming
- Settled: 1900
- Incorporated: 1921

Government
  - Type: Township
  - Mayor: Jean Marc Boileau
  - Governing Body: Armstrong Township Council
  - MP: Pauline Rochefort
  - MPP: John Vanthof

Area
  - Land: 90.16 km^{2} (34.81 sq mi)

Population (2021)
  - Total: 1,199
  - Density: 13.3/km^{2} (34/sq mi)
- Time zone: UTC−05:00 (EST)
  - Summer (DST): UTC−04:00 (EDT)
- Postal code: P0J 1E0
- Area codes: 705, 249
- Website: www.armstrongtownship.com

Armstrong is a township in the Timiskaming District of Ontario. The only population centre in the township is the community of Earlton.

The township is named after Samuel Armstrong, an independent member of the Legislative Assembly of Ontario for Parry Sound from 1886 to 1890.

== History ==
Earlton began to be settled in 1900 as a lumber community by pioneers mostly from York County, soon followed by French-speaking farmers who cultivated the flat prairie-like land of the surrounding Great Clay Belt. In 1904, its post office was opened. The postmaster, Edward Albert Brasher, named the community after his son Earl.

In 1921, Armstrong Township was incorporated.

== Demographics ==
In the 2021 Census of Population conducted by Statistics Canada, Armstrong had a population of 1,199 living in 502 of its 523 total private dwellings, a change of 2.8% from its 2016 population of 1,166. With a land area of 90.16 km^{2} (34.81 sq mi), it had a population density of 13.3/km^{2} (34.4/sq mi) in 2021.

Canada census – Armstrong community profile

	2021	2016	2011
Population	1,199 (+2.8% from 2016)	1,166 (-4.1% from 2011)	1,216 (5.3% from 2006)
Land area	90.16 km^{2} (34.81 sq mi)	90.20 km^{2} (34.83 sq mi)	90.33 km^{2} (34.88 sq mi)
Population density	13.3/km^{2} (34/sq mi)	12.9/km^{2} (33/sq mi)	13.5/km^{2} (35/sq mi)
Median age	39.2 (M: 39.6, F: 39.2)	41.2 (M: 40.1, F: 41.9)	40.5 (M: 38.9, F: 41.9)
Private dwellings	523 (total) 502 (occupied)	521 (total)	516 (total)
Median household income	$72,000	$65,579

References: 2021 2016 2011

Historical census populations – Armstrong, Ontario

Year	Pop.	±%
1911	483	—
1921	693	+43.5%
1931	779	+12.4%
1941	940	+20.7%
1951	1,044	+11.1%
1956	1,149	+10.1%
1961	1,203	+4.7%

Year	Pop.	±%
1966	1,384	+15.0%
1971	1,334	−3.6%
1976	1,444	+8.2%
1981	1,442	−0.1%
1986	1,413	−2.0%
1991	1,394	−1.3%
1996	1,398	+0.3%

Year	Pop.	±%
2001	1,223	−12.5%
2006	1,155	−5.6%
2011	1,216	+5.3%
2016	1,166	−4.1%
2021	1,199	+2.8%

Source: Statistics Canada

Mother tongue (2021):

- English as first language: 40.8%
- French as first language: 51.7%
- English and French as first languages: 3.8%
- Other as first language: 3.3%

== Transportation ==
Earlton (Timiskaming Regional) Airport is a regional airport located in Earlton, which opened in 1937 as an emergency landing area for Trans-Canada Air Lines. The airport today serves private light aircraft. It was served by NorOntair from 1973 to 1996, and by the Air Defense Command in the 1950s.

Ontario Highway 11 is the major road connecting the community with other areas in Timiskaming and beyond. The retail strip is located along 10th Street North.

== See also ==
- List of municipalities in Ontario
- List of townships in Ontario
- List of francophone communities in Ontario
- Northern District School Area Board
