= Unorganized West Timiskaming District =

- Unorganized area
- Timiskaming, Unorganized, West Part
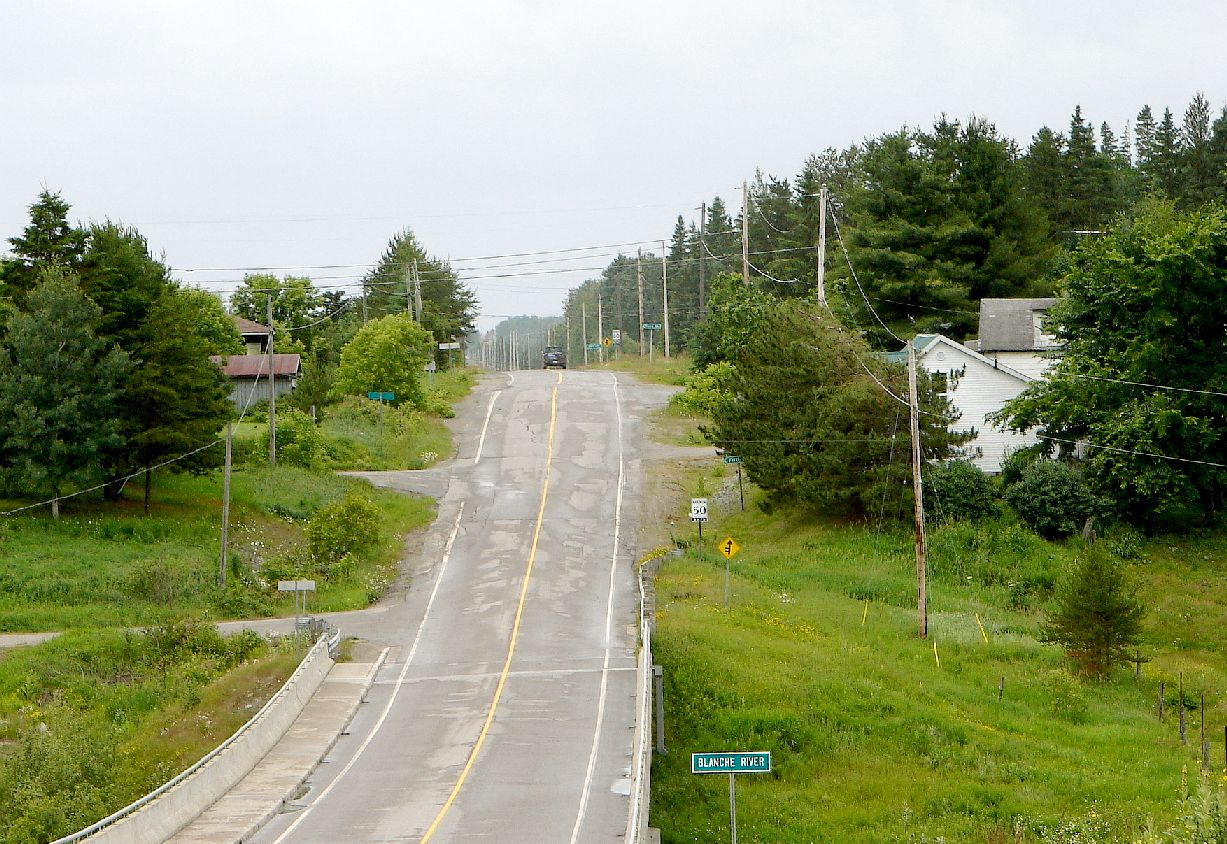
- Tomstown

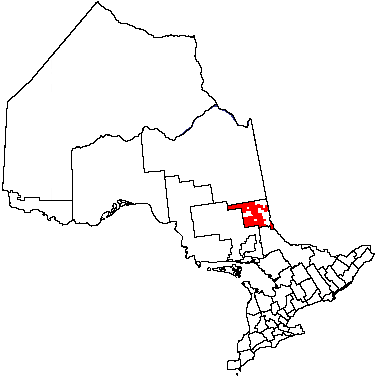
- Coordinates: 47°50′N 80°20′W
- Country: Canada
- Province: Ontario
- District: Timiskaming

Government
  - Fed. ridings: Kapuskasing—Timmins—Mushkegowuk, Nipissing—Timiskaming
  - Prov. ridings: Timiskaming—Cochrane, Nickel Belt

Area
  - Land: 10,239.58 km^{2} (3,953.52 sq mi)

Population (2021)
  - Total: 3,210
  - Density: 0.3/km^{2} (0.78/sq mi)
- Time zone: UTC-5 (EST)
  - Summer (DST): UTC-4 (EDT)
- Area code: 705

Unorganized West Timiskaming District is an unorganized area in the Canadian province of Ontario, comprising almost all portions of the Timiskaming District which are not organized into incorporated municipalities.

The division encompasses 10,199.80 square kilometres (3,938.16 sq mi), and had a population of 3,210 in the 2021 Canadian census.

== Communities ==
Communities in the division include:

- Boston Creek
- Dane
- Gowganda
- Kenabeek
- Kenogami Lake
- King Kirkland
- Lorrain Valley
- Marshall's Corners
- Marter
- Mowat Landing
- Paradis Bay
- Savard
- Sesekinika
- Tarzwell
- Tomstown
- Zeta

== Demographics ==
Canada census – Timiskaming, Unorganized, West Part community profile

	2021	2016	2011
Population	3,210 (-1.4% from 2016)	3,257 (+10.2% from 2011)	2,925 (-11.3% from 2006)
Land area	10,199.80 km^{2} (3,938.16 sq mi)	10,239.58 km^{2} (3,953.52 sq mi)	10,239.58 km^{2} (3,953.52 sq mi)
Population density	0.3/km^{2} (0.78/sq mi)	0.3/km^{2} (0.78/sq mi)	0.3/km^{2} (0.78/sq mi)
Median age	51.2 (M: 52.0, F: 50.0)	56.8 (M: 57.1, F: 56.2)	51.4 (M: 51.9, F: 50.7)
Private dwellings	1,934 (total)	2053 (total)	1912 (total)
Median household income	$81,000	$63,744

Notes: Includes corrections and updates
References: 2021 2016 2011

Historical census populations – Unorganized West Timiskaming District

Year	Pop.	±%
1976	3,102	—
1981	3,155	+1.7%
1986	3,491	+10.6%
1991	3,499	+0.2%
1996	3,541	+1.2%

Year	Pop.	±%
2001	3,275	−7.5%
2006	3,310	+1.1%
2011	2,925	−11.6%
2016	3,257	+11.4%
2021	3,210	−1.4%

Source: Statistics Canada

Mother tongue in 2021 (includes multiple answers):

- English as first language: 80.6 %
- French as first language: 13.4 %
- English and French as first language: 1.2 %
- Other as first language: 4.2 %

== See also ==
- List of townships in Ontario
