= 2022 Manitoulin District municipal elections =

- October 24, 2022

Elections were held in the organized municipalities in the Manitoulin District of Ontario on October 24, 2022, in conjunction with municipal elections across the province.

== Assiginack ==
The following were the results for mayor of Assiginack.

Mayoral Candidate	Vote	%
Brenda Reid	428	61.85
David Ham (X)	264	38.15

== Billings ==
Bryan William Barker was acclaimed as mayor of Billings.

Mayoral Candidate	Vote	%
Bryan William Barker	Acclaimed	

== Burpee and Mills ==
Ken Noland was re-elected as reeve of Burpee and Mills by acclamation.

Reeve Candidate	Vote	%
Ken Noland (X)	Acclaimed	

== Central Manitoulin ==
The following were the results for mayor of Central Manitoulin.

Mayoral Candidate	Vote	%
Richard Stephens (X)	533	39.98
Maja Mielonen	403	30.23
Steve Shaffer	397	29.78

== Cockburn Island ==
The following were the results for mayor of Cockburn Island.

Mayoral Candidate	Vote	%
Brenda Jones (X)	65	50.78
Robert Brown	63	49.22

== Gordon/Barrie Island ==
Elections were not held in Gordon/Barrie Island as the entire council was acclaimed.

Reeve Candidate	Vote	%
Lee Hayden (X)	Acclaimed	

== Gore Bay ==
The following were the results for mayor of Gore Bay.

Mayoral Candidate	Vote	%
Ron Lane	161	61.69
Mo Armstrong	100	38.31

== Northeastern Manitoulin and the Islands ==
Mayor Al MacNevin was re-elected by acclamation.

Mayoral Candidate	Vote	%
Al MacNevin (X)	Acclaimed	

== Tehkummah ==
The following were the results for mayor of Tehkummah.

Reeve Candidate	Vote	%
John Carter Deforge	281	77.20
Eric Russell	83	22.80
