= 2022 Lambton County municipal elections =

Local election in Ontario, Canada

Elections were held in Lambton County, Ontario on October 24, 2022, in conjunction with municipal elections across the province.

== Lambton County Council ==
Lambton County Council includes the mayors of each constituent municipality, the deputy mayors of Lambton Shores and St. Clair plus four city councillors from Sarnia.

Position	Elected
Brooke-Alvinston Mayor	David Ferguson
Dawn-Euphemia Mayor	Alan Broad (acclaimed)
Enniskillen Mayor	Kevin Marriott (acclaimed)
Lambton Shores Mayor	Doug Cook
Lambton Shores Deputy Mayor	Dan Sageman
Oil Springs Mayor	Ian Veen (acclaimed)
Petrolia Mayor	Brad Loosley
Plympton-Wyoming Mayor	Gary Atkinson
Point Edward Mayor	Bev Hand (acclaimed)
Sarnia Mayor	Mike Bradley
Sarnia Councillor	Bill Dennis
Sarnia Councillor	Chrissy McRoberts
Sarnia Councillor	Brian White
Sarnia Councillor	Dave Boushy
St. Clair Mayor	Jeff Agar
St. Clair Deputy Mayor	Steve Miller (acclaimed)
Warwick Mayor	Todd Case

== Brooke-Alvinston ==
=== Mayor ===
The following were the results for mayor of Brooke-Alvinston.

Mayoral Candidate	Vote	%
David Ferguson (X)	634	54.75
James Armstrong	524	45.25

== Dawn-Euphemia ==
=== Mayor ===
Alan Broad was re-elected as mayor of Dawn-Euphemia by acclamation.

Mayoral Candidate	Vote	%
Alan Broad (X)	Acclaimed	

== Enniskillen ==
=== Mayor ===
Kevin Marriott was re-elected as mayor of Enniskillen by acclamation.

Mayoral Candidate	Vote	%
Kevin Marriott (X)	Acclaimed	

== Lambton Shores ==
The following were the results for mayor and deputy mayor of Lambton Shores.

=== Mayor ===
Incumbent mayor Bill Weber did not run for re-election. Running to replace him were deputy mayor Doug Cook and Marilyn Smith.

Mayoral Candidate	Vote	%
Doug Cook	2,922	62.20
Marilyn Smith	1,776	37.80

=== Deputy mayor ===
Deputy mayoral candidate	Vote	%
Dan Sageman	2,343	50.73
Terry Lynn Legault	1,464	31.70
Barry Balcom	812	17.58

== Oil Springs ==
=== Mayor ===
Mayoral Candidate	Vote	%
Ian Veen (X)	Acclaimed	

== Petrolia ==
=== Mayor ===
The following were the results for mayor of Petrolia.

Mayoral Candidate	Vote	%
Brad Loosley (X)	1,264	62.48
Richard Poore	759	37.52

== Plympton-Wyoming ==
=== Mayor ===
Incumbent mayor Lonny Nappier did not run for re-election. Running for the seat was deputy mayor Muriel Wright and councillors Gary Atkinson and Tim Wilkins.

Mayoral Candidate	Vote	%
Gary Atkinson	1,458	47.82
Tim Wilkins	1,215	39.85
Muriel Wright	376	12.33

== Point Edward ==
=== Mayor ===
Bev Hand was re-elected mayor of Point Edward by acclamation.

Mayoral Candidate	Vote	%
Bev Hand (X)	Acclaimed	

== Sarnia ==
The following were the results for mayor and city council of Sarnia.

=== Mayor ===
Incumbent mayor Mike Bradley ran for re-election. He was challenged by city councillor Nathan Colquhoun.

Mayoral Candidate	Vote	%
Mike Bradley (X)	12,561	59.34
Nathan Colquhoun	8,608	40.66

=== Sarnia City Council ===
==== City and County ====
Four to be elected

Candidate	Vote	%
Bill Dennis	9,669	14.33
Chrissy McRoberts	9,526	14.12
Brian White (X)	9,385	13.91
David Boushy (X)	7,863	11.66
Mike Stark (X)	7,679	11.38
Andy Bruziewicz	6,746	10.00
Margaret Bird (X)	6,551	9.71
Al Duffy	6,196	9.19
Bill Anning	3,836	5.69

==== City Council ====
Four to be elected

Candidate	Vote	%
Adam Kilner	7,125	10.12
George Vandenberg (X)	5,999	8.52
Terry Burrell (X)	5,742	8.16
Anne Marie Gillis	4,957	7.04
Michelle Parks	4,902	6.96
Andrew Stokley	4,734	6.73
Lo-Anne Chan	3,951	5.61
Dylan Stelpstra	3,320	4.72
Brooke Daye	3,095	4.40
Susan Theresa MacFarlane	3,027	4.30
Georgette Parsons	2,803	3.98
Bob Dickieson	2,711	3.85
Sarah Bilagot Armstrong	2,342	3.33
Adam Beck	2,114	3.00
Tammy Mathieson	2,075	2.95
Neil Bowen	1,783	2.53
Trevor Pettit	1,421	2.02
Mike McCann	1,392	1.98
Kip Cuthbert	1,357	1.93
David Ross Wood	1,330	1.89
Shirley Davidson	1,292	1.84
Marie Timperley	1,105	1.57
Marie Williams	681	0.87
Briana Reid	598	0.85
John Parker	530	0.75

== St. Clair ==
The following were the results for mayor and deputy mayor of St. Clair.

=== Mayor ===
Incumbent mayor Steve Arnold did not run for re-election. Running to replace him included ward one councillor Tracy Kingston and former councillor Jeff Agar.

Mayoral Candidate	Vote	%
Jeff Agar	2,437	50.25
Tracy Kingston	2,155	44.43
Chad Shymko	258	5.32

=== Deputy mayor ===
Deputy mayoral candidate	Vote	%
Steve Miller (X)	Acclaimed	

== Warwick ==
=== Mayor ===
Incumbent mayor Jackie Rombouts was challenged by former mayor Todd Case.

Mayoral Candidate	Vote	%
Todd Case	907	64.74
Jackie Rombouts (X)	494	35.26
