= 2022 Northumberland County municipal elections =

Local election in Ontario, Canada

Elections were held in Northumberland County, Ontario, on October 24, 2022, in conjunction with municipal elections across the province.

== Northumberland County Council ==
The Northumberland County Council consists of the seven mayors of its constituent municipalities.

Position	Elected
Mayor of Alnwick/Haldimand	John Logel
Mayor of Brighton	Brian Ostrander
Mayor of Cobourg	Lucas Cleveland
Mayor of Cramahe	Mandy Martin (acclaimed)
Mayor of Hamilton	Scott Jibb (acclaimed)
Mayor of Port Hope	Olena Hankivsky
Mayor of Trent Hills	Bob Crate

== Alnwick/Haldimand ==
The following were the results for mayor of Alnwick/Haldimand.

Mayoral Candidate	Vote	%
John Logel	1,034	42.57
Steve Gilchrist	823	33.88
Gritt Koehl	572	23.55

== Brighton ==
Mayor Brian Ostrander was challenged by municipal councillor Doug LeBlanc.

Mayoral Candidate	Vote	%
Brian Ostrander (X)	2,533	52.83
Doug LeBlanc	2,262	47.17

== Cobourg ==
The following were the results for mayor of Cobourg.

Mayoral Candidate	Vote	%
Lucas Cleveland	3,391	50.79
John Henderson (X)	3,286	49.21

== Cramahe ==
Mayor Mandy Martin was re-elected by acclamation.

Mayoral Candidate	Vote	%
Mandy Martin (X)	Acclaimed	

== Hamilton ==
Scott Jibb was elected mayor of Hamilton by acclamation.

Mayoral Candidate	Vote	%
Scott Jibb	Acclaimed	

== Port Hope ==
Mayor Bob Sanderson did not run for re-election.

The following were the results for mayor of Port Hope.

Mayoral Candidate	Vote	%
Olena Hankivsky	2,093	34.17
Jeff Lees	1,894	30.92
Laurie Carr	1,587	25.91
Angela Grogan	551	9.00

== Trent Hills ==
The following were the results for mayor of Trent Hills.

Mayoral Candidate	Vote	%
Bob Crate (X)	2,499	62.04
Susan Fedorka	1,529	37.96
