= 2022 Prescott and Russell United Counties municipal elections =

Elections were held in Prescott and Russell United Counties, Ontario on October 24, 2022 in conjunction with municipal elections across the province.

== Prescott and Russell United Counties Council ==
The Prescott and Russell United Counties Council consists of the mayors of the eight constituent municipalities:

| Municipality | Mayor |
|---|---|
| Alfred and Plantagenet | Yves Laviolette |
| Casselman | Genevieve Lajoie |
| Champlain | Normand Riopel (acclaimed) |
| Clarence-Rockland | Mario Zanth |
| East Hawkesbury | Robert Kirby (acclaimed) |
| Hawkesbury | Robert Lefebvre |
| Russell | Pierre Leroux (acclaimed) |
| The Nation | Francis Brière |

== Alfred and Plantagenet ==
Stéphane Sarrazin, who was elected as mayor in 2018 was elected to provincial parliament in the 2022 Ontario general election for the Progressive Conservative Party of Ontario in Glengarry—Prescott—Russell. Yves Laviolette was appointed mayor in June 2022 to replace him. Laviolette ran for election as mayor, as did township councillors Chantal Galipeau and René Beaulne.

| Mayoral Candidate | Vote | % |
|---|---|---|
| Yves Laviolette (X) | 1,454 | 42.73 |
| René Beaulne | 1,105 | 32.47 |
| Chantal Galipeau | 714 | 20.98 |
| Marc Prudhomme | 130 | 3.82 |

== Casselman ==
Incumbent mayor Daniel Lafleur was challenged by Genevieve Lajoie.

| Mayoral Candidate | Vote | % |
|---|---|---|
| Genevieve Lajoie | 1,029 | 58.80 |
| Daniel Lafleur (X) | 721 | 41.20 |

== Champlain ==
Incumbent mayor Norman Riopel was re-elected by acclamation. He was first elected in 2018.

| Mayoral Candidate | Vote | % |
|---|---|---|
| Normand Riopel (X) | Acclaimed | |

== Clarence-Rockland ==
The following were the results for mayor of Clarence-Rockland.

| Mayoral Candidate | Vote | % |
|---|---|---|
| Mario Zanth (X) | 4,874 | 55.23 |
| Don Bouchard | 3,951 | 44.77 |

== East Hawkesbury ==
Robert Kirby was re-elected as mayor of East Hawkesbury by acclamation.

| Mayoral Candidate | Vote | % |
|---|---|---|
| Robert Kirby (X) | Acclaimed | |

== Hawkesbury ==
Incumbent mayor Paula Assaly was challenged by town councillor Robert Lefebvre.

| Mayoral Candidate | Vote | % |
|---|---|---|
| Robert Lefebvre | 2,468 | 73.37 |
| Paula Assaly (X) | 896 | 26.63 |

== Russell ==
Incumbent mayor Pierre Leroux was re-elected by acclamation. He was first elected in a 2014 by-election.

| Mayoral Candidate | Vote | % |
|---|---|---|
| Pierre Leroux (X) | Acclaimed | |

== The Nation ==
Municipal councillors Francis Brière and Marie-Noëlle Lanthier ran for mayor of The Nation. Incumbent mayor Francois St-Amour ran for Ward 1 councillor.

| Mayoral Candidate | Vote | % |
|---|---|---|
| Francis Brière | 2,103 | 52.75 |
| Marie-Noëlle Lanthier | 1,884 | 47.25 |
