= Walt McKechnie =

Canadian ice hockey player (born 1947)

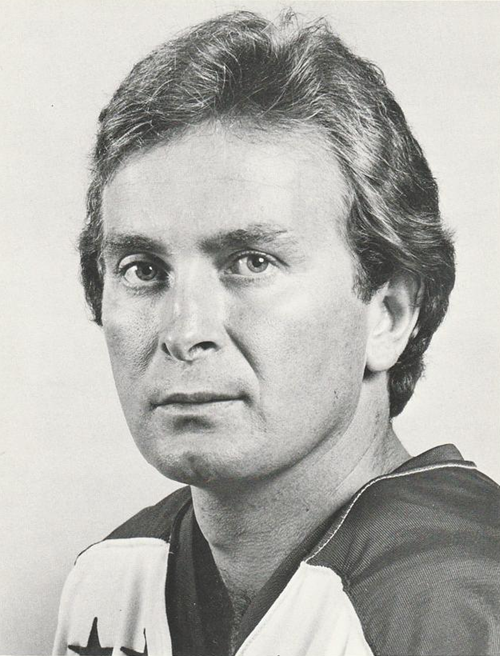
- Born: June 19, 1947 (age 79) London, Ontario, Canada
- Height: 6 ft 2 in (188 cm)
- Weight: 195 lb (88 kg; 13 st 13 lb)
- Position: Centre
- Shot: Left
- Played for: Minnesota North Stars; California Golden Seals; Detroit Red Wings; Boston Bruins; Cleveland Barons; Washington Capitals; Toronto Maple Leafs; Colorado Rockies
- National team: Canada
- NHL draft: 6th overall, 1963; Toronto Maple Leafs
- Playing career: 1963–1984

Walter Thomas John McKechnie (/məˈkɛkniː/ mə-KEK-nee; born June 19, 1947) is a Canadian former professional hockey centre. He played for nine teams in the National Hockey League (NHL) and four minor professional teams over a 17-year pro career. Being drafted sixth overall by the Toronto Maple Leafs in the 1963 NHL amateur draft, he is the franchise's first ever draft pick.

== Playing career ==
McKechnie was drafted sixth overall by the Toronto Maple Leafs in the 1963 NHL amateur draft of 16-year-old players. He played junior hockey with the London Nationals from 1965 to 1967 before turning professional with the Phoenix Roadrunners of the Western Hockey League (WHL) in the 1967–68 season, where he was named the league's rookie of the year. In February 1968, he was acquired by the expansion Minnesota North Stars and played four games in the NHL regular season followed by nine playoff games. For the next three years, he split his time between the North Stars and their minor league affiliates.

In May 1971, McKechnie was traded to the California Golden Seals and received a lot of ice time over his three years with the team, scoring 23 goals and 52 points in the 1973–74 season. In June 1974, he was involved in a three-way trade using the intra-league draft where he was claimed by the New York Rangers and immediately sent to the Boston Bruins for Derek Sanderson. He struggled with the Bruins and was dealt mid-season to the Detroit Red Wings. The next year in Detroit, he put up what would be his NHL career-high numbers, with 26 goals and 82 points, leading the team in scoring. McKechnie followed that a 25-goal season in 1976–77. After the season, he played for Team Canada in the 1977 World Ice Hockey Championships.

Before the next season, McKechnie was traded to the Washington Capitals. He got off to a poor start in Washington and was traded to the Cleveland Barons in December 1977. McKechnie became the property of the Minnesota North Stars when the Barons and North Stars franchises were merged following the 1977–78 season. He was traded to the Toronto Maple Leafs prior to the 1978–79 season, where he scored 25 goals. His goal production dropped the next year, and McKechnie was traded to the Colorado Rockies, where he continued to struggle. He was signed as a free agent by the Red Wings in 1981 and rebounded with an 18-goal season, followed by 14 goals in 1982–83. McKechnie spent the 1983–84 season in the Central Hockey League (CHL) with the Salt Lake Golden Eagles and then retired at age 37. In 955 career NHL games, he scored 214 goals and 392 assists for 606 points.

== Personal ==
McKechnie was a regular at The Strand Billiards in London while playing for the Ontario Hockey Association's London Nationals during the mid-1960s. The pool hall, owned by the late Len Bonk since it first opened in 1952 and closed in September 2005, was like a second home to McKechnie, who refers to The Strand as "the academy."

From 1986 to 2009 he owned and operated "McKeck's", a family-style restaurant on Highland Street in Haliburton, Ontario. He has retired from that business, but the restaurant still operates under the same name. In 2009, McKechnie was inducted into the London Sports Hall of Fame.

Most recently his efforts are directed at fundraising for Prostate Cancer Canada.

McKechnie was elected to Dysart et al municipal council in 2010, and was acclaimed as the municipality's deputy mayor in the 2022 municipal elections. He was appointed mayor of the municipality on July 7, 2026 following the death of Murray Fearrey.

== Career statistics ==
=== Regular season and playoffs ===
			Regular season					Playoffs
Season	Team	League	GP	G	A	Pts	PIM	GP	G	A	Pts	PIM
1963–64	London Nationals	WOHL	—	—	—	—	—	—	—	—	—	—
1965–66	London Nationals	WOHL	46	13	28	41	68	6	7	10	17	2
1966–67	London Nationals	WOHL	48	13	46	59	125	—	—	—	—	—
1967–68	London Nationals	WOHL	1	0	0	0	2	—	—	—	—	—
1967–68	Phoenix Roadrunners	WHL	67	24	30	54	24	4	1	1	2	2
1967–68	Minnesota North Stars	NHL	4	0	0	0	0	9	3	2	5	0
1968–69	Minnesota North Stars	NHL	58	5	9	14	22	—	—	—	—	—
1968–69	Phoenix Roadrunners	WHL	10	3	11	14	6	—	—	—	—	—
1969–70	Minnesota North Stars	NHL	20	1	3	4	21	—	—	—	—	—
1969–70	Iowa Stars	CHL	42	17	24	41	82	11	1	9	10	18
1970–71	Minnesota North Stars	NHL	30	3	1	4	34	—	—	—	—	—
1970–71	Cleveland Barons	AHL	35	16	31	47	28	8	2	4	6	10
1971–72	California Golden Seals	NHL	56	11	20	31	40	—	—	—	—	—
1972–73	California Golden Seals	NHL	78	16	38	54	58	—	—	—	—	—
1973–74	California Golden Seals	NHL	63	23	29	52	14	—	—	—	—	—
1974–75	Boston Bruins	NHL	53	3	3	6	8	—	—	—	—	—
1974–75	Detroit Red Wings	NHL	23	6	11	17	6	—	—	—	—	—
1975–76	Detroit Red Wings	NHL	80	26	56	82	85	—	—	—	—	—
1976–77	Detroit Red Wings	NHL	80	25	34	59	50	—	—	—	—	—
1977–78	Washington Capitals	NHL	16	4	1	5	0	—	—	—	—	—
1977–78	Cleveland Barons	NHL	53	12	22	34	12	—	—	—	—	—
1978–79	Toronto Maple Leafs	NHL	79	25	36	61	18	6	4	3	7	9
1979–80	Toronto Maple Leafs	NHL	54	7	36	43	4	—	—	—	—	—
1979–80	Colorado Rockies	NHL	17	0	4	4	2	—	—	—	—	—
1980–81	Colorado Rockies	NHL	53	15	23	38	18	—	—	—	—	—
1981–82	Detroit Red Wings	NHL	74	18	37	55	35	—	—	—	—	—
1982–83	Detroit Red Wings	NHL	64	14	29	43	42	—	—	—	—	—
1983–84	Salt Lake Golden Eagles	CHL	69	9	32	41	36	—	—	—	—	—
NHL totals			955	214	392	606	469	15	7	5	12	9

=== International ===
Year	Team	Event	GP	G	A	Pts	PIM
1977	Canada	WC	10	1	6	7	28
Senior totals			10	1	6	7	28

Preceded by None	Toronto Maple Leafs first-round draft pick 1963	Succeeded by Tom Raymond Martin
