= 2022 Stormont, Dundas and Glengarry United Counties municipal elections =

- October 24, 2022

Elections were held in Stormont, Dundas and Glengarry United Counties, Ontario on October 24, 2022 in conjunction with municipal elections across the province.

== Stormont, Dundas and Glengarry United Counties Council ==
Council consists of the mayors and deputy mayors of each of the townships. It does not include the city of Cornwall.

Position	Elected
North Dundas Mayor	Tony Fraser (acclaimed)
North Dundas Deputy Mayor	Theresa Bergeron (acclaimed)
North Glengarry Mayor	Jamie MacDonald (acclaimed)
North Glengarry Deputy Mayor	Carma Williams (acclaimed)
North Stormont Mayor	Francois Landry
North Stormont Deputy Mayor	Steve Densham
South Dundas Mayor	Jason Broad
South Dundas Deputy Mayor	Marc St. Pierre
South Glengarry Mayor	Lachlan McDonald
South Glengarry Deputy Mayor	Martin Lang
South Stormont Mayor	Bryan McGillis
South Stormont Deputy Mayor	Andrew Guindon

== North Dundas ==
The following were the results for mayor and deputy mayor of North Dundas.

=== Mayor ===
Incumbent mayor Tony Fraser was acclaimed in his bid for re-election.

Mayoral Candidate	Vote	%
Tony Fraser (X)	Acclaimed	

=== Deputy mayor ===
Deputy Mayoral Candidate	Vote	%
Theresa Bergeron (X)	Acclaimed	

== North Glengarry ==
The following were the results for mayor and deputy mayor of North Glengarry.

=== Mayor ===
Mayor Jamie MacDonald was re-elected by acclamation.

Mayoral Candidate	Vote	%
Jamie MacDonald (X)	Acclaimed	

=== Deputy mayor ===
Deputy Mayoral Candidate	Vote	%
Carma Williams (X)	Acclaimed	

== North Stormont ==
The following were the results for mayor and deputy mayor of North Stormont.

=== Mayor ===
Deputy mayor Francois Landry ran for mayor.

Mayoral Candidate	Vote	%
Francois Landry	1,595	59.58
Roxane Villeneuve	1,082	40.42

=== Deputy mayor ===
Deputy Mayoral Candidate	Vote	%
Steve Densham	1,668	63.83
Dean Laponsee	945	36.17

== South Dundas ==
The following were the results for mayor and deputy mayor of South Dundas.

=== Mayor ===
Running for mayor of South Dundas was deputy mayor Kirsten Gardner and former councillor Bill Ewing.

Mayoral Candidate	Vote	%
Jason Broad	1,596	41.47
Kirsten Gardner	1,160	30.14
Bill Ewing	1,093	28.40

=== Deputy mayor ===
Deputy Mayoral Candidate	Vote	%
Marc St. Pierre	2,040	53.22
Donald William Lewis	1,112	29.01
Tammy Thom	681	17.77

== South Glengarry ==
The following were the results for mayor and deputy mayor of South Glengarry.

=== Mayor ===
Mayoral Candidate	Vote	%
Lachlan McDonald	2,358	53.34
Lyle Warden (X)	2,063	46.66

=== Deputy mayor ===
Deputy Mayoral Candidate	Vote	%
Martin Lang	3,201	74.01
Jacqueline Milner	1,124	25.99

== South Stormont ==
The following were the results for mayor and deputy mayor of South Stormont.

=== Mayor ===
Incumbent mayor Bryan McGillis ran against deputy mayor David Smith.

Mayoral Candidate	Vote	%
Bryan McGillis (X)	2,592	58.64
David Smith	1,828	41.36

=== Deputy mayor ===
Deputy Mayoral Candidate	Vote	%
Andrew Guindon	3,024	68.71
Richard Waldroff	1,377	31.29
