= 2022 Oxford County municipal elections =

Canadian local election

Elections were held in Oxford County, Ontario on October 24, 2022, in conjunction with municipal elections across the province. Each municipality will elect a mayor and a local council, plus two city and county councillors from Woodstock. Trustees to the Thames Valley District School Board, London District Catholic School Board, and Conseil scolaire catholique Providence were also elected. This election was expected to have more candidates than usual, particularly female, due to the launch of Municipal Campaign School Oxford.

== Controversy ==
In early 2022, the Mayor of Woodstock Trevor Birtch was criminally charged by the London Police for assault, sexual assault, and sexual assault with choking. However, he did not resign from his position. He eventually took a paid leave of absence, and appeared in court on May 2 for the sexual assault with choking charge being dropped to a second sexual assault charge, and the matter was adjourned until June 6. Three additional charges of sexual assault, involving a different victim, were added to his case, which will first be put in court on July 4.

== Oxford County Council ==
| Position | Elected |
|---|---|
| Blandford-Blenheim Mayor | Mark Peterson (acclaimed) |
| East Zorra-Tavistock Mayor | Philip Schaefer |
| Ingersoll Mayor | Brian Petrie |
| Norwich Mayor | Jim Palmer |
| South-West Oxford Mayor | David Mayberry (acclaimed) |
| Tilsonburg Mayor | Deb Gilvesy |
| Woodstock Mayor | Jerry Acchione |
| Woodstock Councillor | Deb Tait |
| Woodstock Councillor | Bernia Wheaton |
| Zorra Mayor | Marcus Ryan (acclaimed) |

== Blandford-Blenheim ==
=== Mayor ===
| Mayoral Candidate | Vote | % |
|---|---|---|
| Mark Peterson (X) | Acclaimed | |

=== Township Councillors ===
4 to be elected, electors have multiple votes

| Candidate | Vote | % |
|---|---|---|
| Nancy Demarest (X) | 1,073 | 21.64 |
| Tina Young | 935 | 18.85 |
| George Bruce Banbury (X) | 765 | 15.43 |
| Daryl Barnes | 576 | 11.62 |
| Adam Bell | 525 | 10.59 |
| Randy Balzer (X) | 517 | 10.43 |
| Dillon Occleston | 281 | 5.67 |
| Ron Paterson | 154 | 3.11 |
| Andrew Broschinski | 133 | 2.68 |

== East Zorra-Tavistock ==
=== Mayor ===
| Mayoral Candidate | Vote | % |
|---|---|---|
| Philip Schaefer | 1,218 | 56.23 |
| Donald Edmiston | 948 | 43.77 |

=== Deputy Mayor ===
| Candidate | Vote | % |
|---|---|---|
| Bradley Smith | 1396 | 65.54 |
| Lee Griffi | 734 | 34.46 |

=== Township Councillors ===
==== Ward 1 ====
2 to be elected

| Candidate | Vote | % |
|---|---|---|
| Steven Wyk | Acclaimed | |
| Scott Zher | Acclaimed | |

==== Ward 2 ====
| Candidate | Vote | % |
|---|---|---|
| Scott Rudy (X) | Acclaimed | |

==== Ward 3 ====
2 to be elected

| Candidate | Vote | % |
|---|---|---|
| Jeremy Smith (X) | 556 | 38.77 |
| Matthew Gillespie (X) | 542 | 37.80 |
| Cody Hayward | 336 | 23.43 |

== Ingersoll ==
=== Mayor ===
| Mayoral Candidate | Vote | % |
|---|---|---|
| Brian Petrie | 1,815 | 41.97 |
| Ted Comiskey (X) | 1,582 | 36.58 |
| Tim Lobzun | 928 | 21.46 |

=== Deputy Mayor ===
Former Ontario NDP candidate for Oxford in the 2022 Ontario general election Lindsay Wilson is challenging incumbent Deputy Mayor Fred Freeman.

| Candidate | Vote | % |
|---|---|---|
| Lindsay Wilson | 2947 | 69.08 |
| Fred Freeman (X) | 1319 | 30.92 |

=== Town Councillors ===
5 to be elected, electors have multiple votes

| Candidate | Vote | % |
|---|---|---|
| Kristy Van Kooten Bossence (X) | 2513 | 13.74 |
| Rick Eus (X) | 1972 | 10.78 |
| Shannon Hutson | 1854 | 10.14 |
| Mike Bowman (X) | 1796 | 9.82 |
| Khadijah Haliru | 1708 | 9.34 |
| Ben Lampkin | 1652 | 9.03 |
| Gord Lesser (X) | 1648 | 9.01 |
| Broderick Carey | 1434 | 7.84 |
| Evan McHugh | 1208 | 6.60 |
| Pauline White | 1202 | 6.57 |
| Dixie Bowden | 890 | 4.87 |
| Henny Arends | 416 | 2.27 |

== Norwich ==
=== Mayor ===
| Mayoral Candidate | Vote | % |
|---|---|---|
| Jim Palmer | 2,219 | 51.31 |
| Lynne DePlancke | 1,863 | 43.08 |
| Tyler Zacher-King | 243 | 5.62 |

=== Township Councillors ===
==== Ward 1 ====
| Candidate | Vote | % |
|---|---|---|
| John Scholten (X) | 578 | 51.38 |
| Val Haley | 454 | 40.36 |
| Daniel A Wagner | 93 | 8.27 |

==== Ward 2 ====
| Candidate | Vote | % |
|---|---|---|
| Alisha Stubbs | 759 | 59.02 |
| William Van Lagen | 392 | 30.48 |
| Michael Legge | 135 | 10.50 |

==== Ward 3 ====
| Candidate | Vote | % |
|---|---|---|
| Shawn Gear | 602 | 50.17 |
| John Van Brenk | 598 | 49.83 |

==== Ward 4 ====
| Candidate | Vote | % |
|---|---|---|
| Adrian Couwenberg | 267 | 36.28 |
| Alan Dale (X) | 247 | 33.56 |
| Len Overbeek | 222 | 30.16 |

== South-West Oxford ==
=== Mayor ===
| Mayoral Candidate | Vote | % |
|---|---|---|
| David Mayberry (X) | Acclaimed | |

=== Township Councillors ===
==== Ward 1 ====
| Candidate | Vote | % |
|---|---|---|
| Paul Buchner (X) | 227 | 78.01 |
| Mark Renaud | 64 | 21.99 |

==== Ward 2 ====
| Candidate | Vote | % |
|---|---|---|
| Peter Ypma (X) | Acclaimed | |

==== Ward 3 ====
| Candidate | Vote | % |
|---|---|---|
| Valerie Durston (X) | Acclaimed | |

==== Ward 4 ====
| Candidate | Vote | % |
|---|---|---|
| George Way (X) | Acclaimed | |

==== Ward 5 ====
| Candidate | Vote | % |
|---|---|---|
| Jim Pickard (X) | Acclaimed | |

==== Ward 6 ====
| Candidate | Vote | % |
|---|---|---|
| Craig Gillis (X) | Acclaimed | |

== Tillsonburg ==
=== Mayor ===
| Mayoral Candidate | Vote | % |
|---|---|---|
| Deb Gilvesy | 2,934 | 55.20 |
| Stephen Molnar (X) | 2,381 | 44.80 |

=== Town Councillors ===
6 to be elected, electors have multiple votes

| Candidate | Vote | % |
|---|---|---|
| Dave Beres (X) | 3279 | 12.48 |
| Chris Parker (X) | 3161 | 12.03 |
| Kelly Spencer | 2958 | 11.26 |
| Pete Luciani (X) | 2674 | 10.18 |
| Bob Parsons | 2410 | 9.17 |
| Chris Rosehart (X) | 2336 | 8.89 |
| Cedric Tomico | 2022 | 7.70 |
| Cindy Allen | 1807 | 6.88 |
| Michael Holly | 1705 | 6.49 |
| Max Adam | 1404 | 5.34 |
| Marcel Rosehart | 1061 | 4.04 |
| Mary Anne Van Geertruyde | 826 | 3.14 |
| Barbara Bleck | 628 | 2.39 |

== Woodstock ==
=== Mayor ===
Mayor Trevor Birtch sought re-election. He was facing charges for sexual assault.

| Mayoral Candidate | Vote | % |
|---|---|---|
| Jerry Acchione | 3,612 | 38.68 |
| David Hilderley | 3,441 | 36.85 |
| Anthony Scalisi | 1,883 | 20.16 |
| Trevor Birtch (X) | 305 | 3.27 |
| Peter Croves | 66 | 0.71 |
| Henry Biro | 31 | 0.33 |

=== City-County Councillor ===
2 to be elected

| Candidate | Vote | % |
|---|---|---|
| Bernia Wheaton | 4,509 | 29.62 |
| Deb Tait (X) | 4,207 | 27.63 |
| Paul Plant | 3,788 | 24.88 |
| Sandra J. Talbot (X) | 2,721 | 17.87 |

=== City Councillor ===
4 to be elected

| Candidate | Vote | % |
|---|---|---|
| Kate Leatherbarrow | 4,901 | 15.74 |
| Liz Wismer-Van Meer | 4,843 | 15.55 |
| Connie Lauder (X) | 3,605 | 11.58 |
| Mark Schadenberg (X) | 3,598 | 11.56 |
| Jay Pember | 3,425 | 11.00 |
| Jaspreet Sandhu | 2,381 | 7.65 |
| Duane Kumala-Thomas | 2,247 | 7.22 |
| Wes Mazur | 2,098 | 6.74 |
| Leah Santos | 1,082 | 3.47 |
| Dave Babcock | 1,064 | 3.42 |
| Allison Frederick Gowling | 856 | 2.75 |
| Jason Norris | 699 | 2.24 |
| Francisco Cornejo | 339 | 1.09 |

== Zorra ==
=== Mayor ===
| Mayoral Candidate | Vote | % |
|---|---|---|
| Marcus Ryan (X) | Acclaimed | |

=== Township Councillors ===
==== Ward 1 ====
| Candidate | Vote | % |
|---|---|---|
| Kevin Stewart | 241 | 67.13 |
| Emily Moitoso | 118 | 32.87 |

==== Ward 2 ====
| Candidate | Vote | % |
|---|---|---|
| Katie Grigg | Acclaimed | |

==== Ward 3 ====
| Candidate | Vote | % |
|---|---|---|
| Paul Mitchell (X) | Acclaimed | |

==== Ward 4 ====
| Candidate | Vote | % |
|---|---|---|
| Crystal Finch | 394 | 74.20 |
| Steve MacDonald (X) | 137 | 25.80 |

== School Boards ==
=== Thames Valley District School Board ===
| Candidate | Vote | % |
|---|---|---|
| Leeanne Hopkins | 4647 | 45.27 |
| Seth Allen | 2850 | 27.76 |
| David Cripps | 2768 | 26.97 |

=== London District Catholic School Board ===
| Candidate | Vote | % |
|---|---|---|
| Mary Holmes (X) | 781 | 74.17 |
| Ana Paula Alves | 272 | 25.83 |

=== Conseil scolaire catholique Providence ===
| Candidate | Vote | % |
|---|---|---|
| Alexandre Alary (X) | Acclaimed | |
