= 2022 Renfrew County municipal elections =

Elections were held in Renfrew County, Ontario on October 24, 2022 in conjunction with municipal elections across the province.

== Renfrew County Council ==
County council has no direct elections; its membership is made up of the mayors and reeves of the lower-tier municipalities of the county (including the reeves - rather than mayors - of Deep River, Laurentian Valley and Renfrew), while Arnpror elects a separate councillor for county council. Therefore, elections in those municipalities determine the members of council for the new term. The elected candidates are below:

| Position | Elected |
|---|---|
| Mayor of Admaston Bromley | Michael Donohue |
| Arnprior County Councillor | Daniel Lynch |
| Mayor of Bonnechere Valley | Jennifer Murphy |
| Mayor of Brudenell, Lyndoch and Raglan | Valerie Jahn |
| Reeve of Deep River | Glenn Doncaster |
| Mayor of Greater Madawaska | Rob Weir |
| Mayor of Head, Clara and Maria | Debbi Grills |
| Mayor of Horton | David M. Bennett (acclaimed) |
| Mayor of Killaloe, Hagarty and Richards | David Mayville |
| Mayor of Laurentian Hills | Anne Giardini (acclaimed) |
| Reeve of Laurentian Valley | Keith Watt |
| Mayor of Madawaska Valley | Mark Willmer |
| Mayor of McNab/Braeside | Mark Mackenzie |
| Mayor of North Algona Wilberforce | James Andrew Brose |
| Mayor of Petawawa | Gary Serviss |
| Reeve of Renfrew | Peter Emon (acclaimed) |
| Mayor of Whitewater Region | Neil Nicholson |

== Admaston Bromley ==
=== Mayor ===
The following were the results for mayor of Admaston Bromley.

| Mayoral Candidate | Vote | % |
|---|---|---|
| Michael Donohue (X) | 718 | 55.15 |
| Jack Kelly | 584 | 44.85 |

== Arnprior ==
The following were the results for mayor and county councillor of Arnprior.

=== Mayor ===
Incumbent mayor Walter Stack was challenged by town councillor Lisa McGee, and Mike Defalco.

| Mayoral Candidate | Vote | % |
|---|---|---|
| Lisa McGee | 1,868 | 53.10 |
| Walter Stack (X) | 1,191 | 33.85 |
| Mike Defalco | 459 | 13.05 |

=== County councillor ===
| Candidate | Vote | % |
|---|---|---|
| Daniel Lynch (X) | 1,987 | 61.21 |
| Ron Demmers | 1,259 | 38.79 |

== Bonnechere Valley ==
=== Mayor ===
Mayor Jennifer Murphy was challenged by former mayor Zig Mintha, 2018 Ontario general election Liberal candidate Jackie Agnew and political newcomer Leanne Panke.

| Mayoral Candidate | Vote | % |
|---|---|---|
| Jennifer Murphy (X) | 778 | 36.07 |
| Zig Mintha | 693 | 32.13 |
| Jackie Agnew | 552 | 25.59 |
| Leanne Panke | 134 | 6.21 |

== Brudenell, Lyndoch and Raglan ==
=== Mayor ===
The following were the results for mayor of Brudenell, Lyndoch and Raglan.

| Mayoral Candidate | Vote | % |
|---|---|---|
| Valerie Jahn | 570 | 54.44 |
| Rick Clements | 333 | 31.81 |
| Andrea Budarick | 144 | 13.75 |

== Deep River ==
The following were the results for mayor and reeve of Deep River.

=== Mayor ===
| Mayoral Candidate | Vote | % |
|---|---|---|
| Suzanne D'Eon (X) | Acclaimed | |

=== Reeve ===
| Reeve Candidate | Vote | % |
|---|---|---|
| Glenn Doncaster (X) | 949 | 74.90 |
| Catherine Ryan | 318 | 25.10 |

== Greater Madawaska ==
=== Mayor ===
The following were the results for mayor of Greater Madawaska.

| Mayoral Candidate | Vote | % |
|---|---|---|
| Rob Weir | 866 | 48.93 |
| Debora Giffin | 633 | 35.76 |
| Jim Hemlin | 245 | 13.84 |
| Lucie Perrier | 26 | 1.47 |

== Head, Clara and Maria ==
=== Mayor ===
The following were the results for mayor of Head, Clara and Maria.

| Mayoral Candidate | Vote | % |
|---|---|---|
| Debbi Grills (X) | 147 | 67.74 |
| Robert Reid | 70 | 32.26 |

== Horton ==
=== Mayor ===
David Bennett was re-elected by acclamation as mayor of Horton.

| Mayoral Candidate | Vote | % |
|---|---|---|
| David M. Bennett (X) | Acclaimed | |

== Killaloe, Hagarty and Richards ==
=== Mayor ===
The following were the results for mayor of Killaloe, Hagarty and Richards.

| Mayoral Candidate | Vote | % |
|---|---|---|
| David Mayville | 983 | 52.29 |
| Janice Tiedje (X) | 897 | 47.71 |

== Laurentian Hills ==
=== Mayor ===
Deputy mayor Anne Giardini was elected as mayor by acclamation.

| Mayoral Candidate | Vote | % |
|---|---|---|
| Anne Giardini | Acclaimed | |

== Laurentian Valley ==
The following were the results for mayor and reeve of Laurentian Valley.

=== Mayor ===
Mayor Steven Bennett was re-elected by acclamation for a third straight term.

| Mayoral Candidate | Vote | % |
|---|---|---|
| Steve Bennett (X) | Acclaimed | |

=== Reeve ===
| Reeve Candidate | Vote | % |
|---|---|---|
| Keith Watt | 1,685 | 57.51 |
| Chris Pleau | 1,245 | 42.49 |

== Madawaska Valley ==
=== Mayor ===
The following were the results for mayor of Madawaska Valley.

| Mayoral Candidate | Vote | % |
|---|---|---|
| Mark Willmer | 1,801 | 60.13 |
| Roger Prince | 1,194 | 39.87 |

== McNab/Braeside ==
=== Mayor ===
The following were the results for mayor of McNab/Braeside.

| Mayoral Candidate | Vote | % |
|---|---|---|
| Mark Mackenzie | 1,363 | 44.07 |
| Oliver Jacob | 867 | 28.03 |
| Tom Peckett (X) | 863 | 27.90 |

== North Algona Wilberforce ==
=== Mayor ===
Incumbent mayor James Brose was challenged by former mayor Deborah Farr.

| Mayoral Candidate | Vote | % |
|---|---|---|
| James Andrew Brose (X) | 1,220 | 80.69 |
| Deborah Farr | 292 | 19.31 |

== Petawawa ==
=== Mayor ===
The following were the results for mayor of Petawawa.

| Mayoral Candidate | Vote | % |
|---|---|---|
| Gary Serviss | 2,446 | 74.10 |
| Jody Anne McDonald | 855 | 25.90 |

== Renfrew ==
The following were the results for mayor and reeve of Renfrew.

=== Mayor ===
Running for mayor of Renfrew were former mayor and incumbent councillor Sandi Heins, incumbent councillor Tom Sidney and controversial fringe candidate Callum Scott.

| Mayoral Candidate | Vote | % |
|---|---|---|
| Tom Sidney | 873 | 31.79 |
| Sandi Heins | 861 | 31.35 |
| Michael Coulas | 691 | 25.16 |
| Kathryn E. Windle | 168 | 6.12 |
| Callum Scott | 153 | 5.57 |

=== Reeve ===
| Reeve Candidate | Vote | % |
|---|---|---|
| Peter Emon (X) | Acclaimed | |

== Whitewater Region ==
The following were the results for mayor of Whitewater Region.

Until 2022, Whitewater Region elected a reeve which sat of Renfrew County Council. In 2021, it was decided to replace the position with a deputy mayor, and have the mayor sit on County Council instead.

=== Mayor ===
Outspoken government critic and president of the Renfrew County Landowner's Association Donna Burns ran against councillor Neil Nicholson.

| Mayoral Candidate | Vote | % |
|---|---|---|
| Neil Nicholson | 2,156 | 79.73 |
| Donna Burns | 548 | 20.27 |
