= 2022 Grey County municipal elections =

Local election in Ontario, Canada

Elections were held in Grey County, Ontario on October 24, 2022, in conjunction with municipal elections across the province.

== Grey County Council ==
The Grey County Council consists of the mayors and deputy mayors of each of the constituent communities.

Position	Elected
Chatsworth Mayor	Scott Mackey
Chatsworth Deputy Mayor	Terry McKay
Georgian Bluffs Mayor	Sue Carleton
Georgian Bluffs Deputy Mayor	Grant Pringle (acclaimed)
Grey Highlands Mayor	Paul McQueen
Grey Highlands Deputy Mayor	Dane Nielsen
Hanover Mayor	Sue Paterson
Hanover Deputy Mayor	Warren Dickert
Meaford Mayor	Ross Kentner
Meaford Deputy Mayor	Shirley Keaveney (acclaimed)
Owen Sound Mayor	Ian Boddy
Owen Sound Deputy Mayor	Scott Greig
Southgate Mayor	Brian Milne
Southgate Deputy Mayor	Barbara Dobreen
The Blue Mountains Mayor	Andrea Matrosovs
The Blue Mountains Deputy Mayor	Peter Bordignon (acclaimed)
West Grey Mayor	Kevin Eccles
West Grey Deputy Mayor	Tom Hutchinson

== The Blue Mountains ==
The following were the results for mayor and deputy mayor of The Blue Mountains.

=== Mayor ===
Incumbent mayor Alar Soever did not run for re-election. Town councillor Andrea Matrosovs ran to replace him.

Mayoral Candidate	Vote	%
Andrea Matrosovs	1,564	38.61
Tony Poole	1,084	26.76
Joe Halos	783	19.33
Elizabeth Marshall	620	15.30

=== Deputy mayor ===
Deputy mayoral candidate	Vote	%
Peter Bordignon (X)	Acclaimed	

== Chatsworth ==
The following were the results for mayor and deputy mayor of Chatsworth.

=== Mayor ===
Mayoral Candidate	Vote	%
Scott Mackey (X)	1,870	83.86
Kent Nuhn	360	16.14

=== Deputy mayor ===
Deputy mayoral candidate	Vote	%
Terry McKay	1,221	55.12
Diana Rae	994	44.88

== Georgian Bluffs ==
The following were the results for mayor and deputy mayor of Georgian Bluffs.

=== Mayor ===
Incumbent mayor Dwight Burley was challenged by deputy mayor Sue Carleton.

Mayoral Candidate	Vote	%
Sue Carleton	1,727	47.84
Dwight Burley (X)	948	26.26
Scott Catto	935	25.90

=== Deputy mayor ===
Deputy mayoral candidate	Vote	%
Grant Pringle	Acclaimed	

== Grey Highlands ==
The following were the results for mayor and deputy mayor of Grey Highlands.

=== Mayor ===
Incumbent mayor Paul McQueen was challenged by municipal councillor Danielle Valiquette, and Don Alp.

Mayoral Candidate	Vote	%
Paul McQueen (X)	2,346	65.53
Danielle Valiquette	969	27.07
Don Alp	265	7.40

=== Deputy mayor ===
Deputy mayoral candidate	Vote	%
Dane Nielsen	1,793	52.66
Steve Patrick Maloney	906	26.61
Melanie Ann Seeley	706	20.73

== Hanover ==
The following were the results mayor and deputy mayor of Hanover.

=== Mayor ===
Mayoral Candidate	Vote	%
Sue Paterson (X)	1,881	80.83
Rob McKean	446	19.17

=== Deputy mayor ===
Deputy mayoral candidate	Vote	%
Warren Dickert	1,317	56.43
Selwyn Hicks (X)	1,017	43.57

== Meaford ==
The following were the results for mayor and deputy mayor of Meaford.

=== Mayor ===
Municipal councillors Ross Kentner and Paul Vickers ran for mayor.

Mayoral Candidate	Vote	%
Ross Kentner	2,063	53.74
Paul Vickers	1,776	46.26

=== Deputy mayor ===
Deputy mayoral candidate	Vote	%
Shirley Keaveney (X)	Acclaimed	

== Owen Sound ==
The following were the results for mayor and deputy mayor of Owen Sound.

=== Mayor ===
Mayoral Candidate	Vote	%
Ian Boddy (X)	3,372	55.56
Richard Thomas	2,697	44.44

=== Deputy mayor ===
Deputy mayoral candidate	Vote	%
Scott Greig	3,717	62.47
Brian O'Leary (X)	2,233	37.53

== Southgate ==
The following were the results for mayor and deputy mayor of Southgate.

=== Mayor ===
Incumbent mayor John Woodbury did not run for re-election. Deputy mayor and former mayor Brian Milne ran against councillor Michael Sherson to replace him.

Mayoral Candidate	Vote	%
Brian Milne	911	51.82
Michael Sherson	847	48.18

=== Deputy mayor ===
Deputy mayoral candidate	Vote	%
Barbara Dobreen	1,319	77.27
Doug MacDonald	388	22.73

== West Grey ==
The following were the results for mayor and deputy mayor of West Grey.

=== Mayor ===
Incumbent mayor Christine Robinson was challenged by former mayor Kevin Eccles and municipal councillor Stephen Townsend.

Mayoral Candidate	Vote	%
Kevin Eccles	1,834	46.34
Stephen Townsend	1,125	28.42
Christine Robinson (X)	999	25.24

=== Deputy mayor ===
Deputy mayoral candidate	Vote	%
Tom Hutchinson (X)	2,718	75.04
Butch Attersoll	904	24.96
