= 2022 Dufferin County municipal elections =

Local election in Ontario, Canada

- October 24, 2022

Elections were held in Dufferin County, Ontario on October 24, 2022, in conjunction with municipal elections across the province.

== Dufferin County Council ==
Dufferin County Council has 14 members, two from each constituent municipality except for East Garafraxa and East Luther Grand Valley which elect just one member.

Position	Elected
Amaranth Mayor	Chris Gerrits
Amaranth Deputy Mayor	Gail Little
East Garafraxa Mayor	Guy Gardhouse (acclaimed)
Grand Valley Mayor	Steve Soloman (acclaimed)
Melancthon Mayor	Darren White
Melancthon Deputy Mayor	James McLean
Mono Mayor	John Creelman (acclaimed)
Mono Deputy Mayor	Fred Nix (acclaimed)
Mulmur Mayor	Janet Horner (acclaimed)
Mulmur Deputy Mayor	Earl Hawkins
Orangeville Mayor	Lisa Post
Orangeville Deputy Mayor	Todd Taylor
Shelburne Mayor	Wade Mills (acclaimed)
Shelburne Deputy Mayor	Shane Hall

== Amaranth ==
The following were the results for mayor and deputy mayor of Amaranth.

=== Mayor ===
Deputy mayor Chris Gerrits ran against township councillor Heather Foster.

Mayoral Candidate	Vote	%
Chris Gerrits	700	62.17
Heather Foster	426	37.83

=== Deputy mayor ===
Deputy mayoral candidate	Vote	%
Gail Little	580	52.54
George Grutca	524	47.46

== East Garafraxa ==
=== Mayor ===
Guy Gardhouse was re-elected as mayor of East Garafraxa by acclamation.

Mayoral Candidate	Vote	%
Guy Gardhouse (X)	Acclaimed	

== Grand Valley ==
=== Mayor ===
Steve Soloman was re-elected by acclamation as mayor of Grand Valley.

Mayoral Candidate	Vote	%
Steve Soloman (X)	Acclaimed	

== Melancthon ==
The following were the results for mayor and deputy mayor of Melancthon.

=== Mayor ===
Mayoral Candidate	Vote	%
Darren White (X)	629	76.99
Wayne Hannon	188	23.01

=== Deputy mayor ===
Deputy mayoral candidate	Vote	%
James McLean	688	84.52
Margaret Mercer	126	15.48

== Mono ==
The following were the results for mayor and deputy mayor of Mono.

=== Mayor ===
John Creelman was appointed as mayor in September 2021 after the previous mayor, Laura Ryan resigned. He was elected by acclamation.

Mayoral Candidate	Vote	%
John Creelman (X)	Acclaimed	

=== Deputy mayor ===
Deputy mayoral candidate	Vote	%
Fred Nix (X)	Acclaimed	

== Mulmur ==
The following were the results for mayor and deputy mayor of Mulmur.

=== Mayor ===
Mayoral Candidate	Vote	%
Janet Horner (X)	Acclaimed	

=== Deputy mayor ===
Deputy mayoral candidate	Vote	%
Earl Hawkins (X)	708	54.25
Shirley Boxem	597	45.75

== Orangeville ==
The following were the results for mayor and deputy mayor of Orangeville.

=== Mayor ===
Mayoral Candidate	Vote	%
Lisa Post	2,984	50.54
Jeffrey Wallace Patterson	1,804	30.56
Jeremy Williams	839	14.21
Kim Reid	277	4.69

=== Deputy mayor ===
Deputy mayoral candidate	Vote	%
Todd Taylor	4,727	82.21
Trevor Castiglione	1,023	17.79

== Shelburne ==
The following were the results for mayor and deputy mayor of Shelburne.

=== Mayor ===
Incumbent mayor Wade Mills was re-elected by acclamation to serve a second term as mayor of Shelburne.

Mayoral Candidate	Vote	%
Wade Mills (X)	Acclaimed	

=== Deputy mayor ===
Deputy mayoral candidate	Vote	%
Shane Hall	1,087	52.08
Steve Anderson (X)	952	45.62
Kuldeep Verma	48	2.30
