= 2022 Frontenac County municipal elections =

Local election in Ontario, Canada

- October 24, 2022

Elections were held in Frontenac County, Ontario on October 24, 2022, in conjunction with municipal elections across the province.

== Frontenac County Council ==
Frontenac County Council consists of the mayors of each of the four constituent municipalities plus an additional councillor from each municipality.

Position	Elected
Central Frontenac Mayor	Frances L. Smith (acclaimed)
Central Frontenac Councillor	Selected from council
Frontenac Islands Mayor	Judith Anne Greenwood-Speers
Frontenac Islands Councillor	Selected from council
North Frontenac Mayor	Gerry Lichty
North Frontenac Councillor	Selected from council
South Frontenac Mayor	Ron Vandewal
South Frontenac Councillor	Selected from council

== Central Frontenac ==
Frances L. Smith was re-elected by acclamation.

Mayoral Candidate	Vote	%
Frances L. Smith (X)	Acclaimed	

== Frontenac Islands ==
The following were the results for mayor of Frontenac Islands.

Mayoral Candidate	Vote	%
Judith Anne Greenwood-Speers	672	45.07
Randy Rixten	514	34.47
Barbara Springgay	305	20.46

== North Frontenac ==
The following were the results for mayor of North Frontenac.

Mayoral Candidate	Vote	%
Gerry Lichty	1,211	58.17
Ron Higgins (X)	871	41.83

== South Frontenac ==
The following were the results for mayor of South Frontenac.

Mayoral Candidate	Vote	%
Ron Vandewal (X)	3,090	48.03
Alan Revill	1,843	28.64
Mark Schjerning	1,501	23.33
