= 2022 Lennox and Addington County municipal elections =

Local election in Ontario, Canada

- October 24, 2022

Elections were held in Lennox and Addington County, Ontario on October 24, 2022 in conjunction with municipal elections across the province.

== Lennox and Addington County Council ==
The Lennox and Addington County Council consists of the three municipal reeves, mayor of Greater Napanee and the three deputy reeves and the Deputy Reeve of Greater Napanee.

| Position | Elected |
|---|---|
| Addington Highlands Reeve | Henry Hogg |
| Addington Highlands Deputy Reeve | (selected from council) |
| Greater Napanee Mayor | Terry Richardson (acclaimed) |
| Greater Napanee Deputy Mayor | Brian Calver |
| Loyalist Mayor | Jamie Hegadorn |
| Loyalist Deputy Mayor | Nathan Townend |
| Stone Mills Reeve | John Wise (acclaimed) |
| Stone Mills Deputy Reeve | Douglas A. Davidson (acclaimed) |

== Addington Highlands ==
Addington Highlands is divided into two wards. Of the five members of council, the Reeve is elected “at large” by vote of all the electors and two of the four councillors are elected by the voters in this ward.

=== Reeve ===
| Reeve Candidate | Votes | % |
|---|---|---|
| Henry Hogg (X) | 980 | 65.25 |
| Marlean McLean | 522 | 34.75 |

=== Deputy Reeve ===
(selected from council)

=== Councillor Ward 1 ===
| Councillor Candidate | Votes |
|---|---|
| Tony Fritsch (X) | 464 |
| Kirby Thompson (X) | 377 |
| Royce Rosenblath | 368 |

=== Councillor Ward 2 ===
| Councillor Candidate | Votes |
|---|---|
| Kenneth Hook | 563 |
| E. Helen Yanch (X) | 366 |
| Bill Cox | 289 |
| David L. Miles | 253 |

== Greater Napanee ==
Greater Napanee is divided into five wards. Of the seven members of council, the Mayor and Deputy Mayor are elected “at large” by vote of all the electors and one of the five councillors are elected by the voters in this ward.

=== Mayor ===
Mayor Marg Isbester did not run for re-election.

| Mayoral Candidate | Vote | % |
|---|---|---|
| Terry Richardson | Acclaimed | |

=== Deputy Mayor ===
| Deputy Mayoral Candidate | Vote | % |
|---|---|---|
| Brian Calver | 2,402 | 51.18 |
| John McCormack | 1,478 | 31.49 |
| Eric DePoe | 813 | 17.32 |

=== Ward 1 Councillor ===
| Candidate | Votes |
|---|---|
| Michael Schenk | 610 |
| Tony Balasevicius | 386 |
| Matt Potwarka | 35 |

=== Ward 2 Councillor ===
| Candidate | Votes |
|---|---|
| Angela Hicks | 429 |
| Terry Cook | 324 |
| Les Humphries | 184 |

=== Ward 3 Councillor ===
| Candidate | Votes |
|---|---|
| Dave Pinnell Jr.(X) | 388 |
| Richard Pringle | 302 |
| Don Stokes | 265 |
| John South | 166 |

=== Ward 4 Councillor ===
| Candidate | Votes |
|---|---|
| Bob Norrie(X) | 391 |
| Josh Hayter | 304 |
| Jeff Chestnut | 137 |

=== Ward 5 Councillor ===
| Candidate | Votes |
|---|---|
| Bill Martin | 285 |
| Casey Wells | 252 |
| Ellen Johnson | 167 |

== Loyalist ==
Loyalist is divided into three wards. Of the seven members of council, the Mayor and Deputy Mayor are elected “at large” by vote of all the electors and one of the five councillors are elected by the voters in this ward.

=== Mayor ===
Previous mayor Ric Bresee was elected to the Ontario Legislature in the 2022 Ontario general election for the Progressive Conservative Party of Ontario in the riding of Hastings—Lennox and Addington. Deputy mayor Jim Hegadorn was appointed mayor August 8, and ran for election for a full term.

| Mayoral Candidate | Vote | % |
|---|---|---|
| Jamie Hegadorn (X) | 3,647 | 90.97 |
| Penny Porter | 362 | 9.03 |

=== Deputy Mayor ===
| Deputy Mayoral Candidate | Vote | % |
|---|---|---|
| Nathan Townend | 2,488 | 62.80 |
| Ron Gordon | 1,474 | 37.20 |

Ward 1 Councillor
| Candidate | Votes |
|---|---|
| Lorna Willis(X) | 202 |
| Duncan Ashley | 167 |

Ward 2 Councillor
| Candidate | Votes |
|---|---|
| Carol Parks(X) | 385 |
| Joy Silver | 349 |

Ward 3 Councillor
| Candidate | Votes |
|---|---|
| Mike Budarick(X) | 1,594 |
| Jake Ennis | 1,555 |
| Paul Proderick | 1,422 |
| James Babcock | 899 |
| Ted McGrath | 859 |
| Drew Cumpson | 775 |

== Stone Mills ==
Stone Mills holds elections at large. All the seven members of council, the Reeve, Deputy Reeve and five councillors are elected by the voters.

=== Reeve ===
| Reeve Candidate | Vote | % |
|---|---|---|
| John Wise | Acclaimed | |

=== Deputy Reeve ===
| Deputy Reeve Candidate | Vote | % |
|---|---|---|
| Douglas A. Davidson | Acclaimed | |

=== Councillors (At Large) ===
| Candidate | Votes |
|---|---|
| Rob Fenwick | 1320 |
| Shari Milligan (X) | 1244 |
| Wenda Lalande (X) | 1177 |
| Wendy McDonald | 1138 |
| Krysta-Lee Woodcock | 1128 |
| Kevin Richmond | 942 |
| Amberlyn Bishop | 369 |
| Adam Pyne | 306 |
| Dennis Masson | 264 |
