= 2022 Perth County municipal elections =

Local election in Ontario, Canada

- October 24, 2022

Elections were held in Perth County, Ontario on October 24, 2022 in conjunction with municipal elections across the province.

== Perth County Council ==
Perth County Council consists of 10 members and uses a weighted voting method so that member's votes match the populations of the constituent communities.

Position	Elected	Weighted votes
Perth East Mayor	Rhonda Ehgoetz	2
Perth East Deputy Mayor	Hugh McDermid (acclaimed)	2
Perth East Councillor	Appointed by Township Council	2
Perth South Mayor	Jim Aitcheson (acclaimed)	1
Perth South Deputy Mayor	Appointed by Township Council	1
West Perth Mayor	Walter McKenzie	2
West Perth Deputy Mayor	W. Dean Trentowsky	2
North Perth Mayor	Todd Kasenberg	2
North Perth Deputy Mayor	Doug Kellum	2
North Perth Councillor	Appointed by Municipal Council	2

== North Perth ==
The following were the results for mayor and deputy mayor of North Perth.

=== Mayor ===
Mayoral Candidate	Vote	%
Todd Kasenberg (X)	2,298	81.78
Julian George	512	18.22

=== Deputy mayor ===
Deputy mayoral candidate	Vote	%
Doug Kellum (X)	2,490	82.53
Colin Burrowes	527	17.47

== Perth East ==
The following were the results for mayor and deputy mayor of Perth East.

=== Mayor ===
Mayoral Candidate	Vote	%
Rhonda Ehgoetz (X)	1,621	57.93
Brenda Nurse	1,177	42.07

=== Deputy mayor ===
Deputy mayoral candidate	Vote	%
Hugh McDermid (X)	Acclaimed	

== Perth South ==
Jim Aitcheson was elected as mayor of Perth South by acclamation.

=== Mayor ===
Mayoral Candidate	Vote	%
Jim Aitcheson	Acclaimed	

== West Perth ==
The following were the results for mayor and deputy mayor of West Perth.

=== Mayor ===
Incumbent mayor Walter McKenzie was challenged by deputy mayor Doug Eidt.

Mayoral Candidate	Vote	%
Walter McKenzie (X)	1,893	65.21
Douglas Neil Eidt	1,010	34.79

=== Deputy mayor ===
Deputy mayoral candidate	Vote	%
W. Dean Trentowsky	1,761	61.51
Cheri Bell	1,102	38.49
