= 2022 Kenora District municipal elections =

Elections in Ontario 2022

- October 24, 2022

Elections were held in the organized municipalities in the Kenora District of Ontario on October 24, 2022 in conjunction with municipal elections across the province.

== Dryden ==
Incumbent mayor Greg Wilson did not run for re-election. City councillor Shayne MacKinnon ran for mayor against Jack B. Harrison.

Mayoral Candidate	Vote	%
Jack B. Harrison	1,618	69.03
Shayne MacKinnon	726	30.97

== Ear Falls ==
Kevin Kahoot was re-elected by acclamation as mayor of Ear Falls.

Mayoral Candidate	Vote	%
Kevin Kahoot (X)	Acclaimed	

== Ignace ==
The following were the results for mayor of Ignace.

Mayoral Candidate	Vote	%
Bill Gascon	580	81.12
Penny Lucas (X)	135	18.88

== Kenora ==
Mayor Dan Reynard originally announced he would be running for re-election. However, he later announced he would not.

The following were the results for mayor of Kenora.

Mayoral Candidate	Vote	%
Andrew Poirier	3,778	64.18
Andy Scribilo	1,475	25.06
David Byers-Kitt	634	10.77

== Machin ==
The following were the results for mayor of Machin.

Mayoral Candidate	Vote	%
Gordon Griffiths (X)	184	58.60
Garry Parkes	130	41.40

== Pickle Lake ==
The following were the results for mayor of Pickle Lake.

Mayoral Candidate	Vote	%
James Dalzell	69	45.10
Robert Rasmussen	57	37.25
Robyn Makela	27	17.65

== Red Lake ==
The following were the results for mayor of Red Lake.

Mayoral Candidate	Vote	%
Fred Mota (X)	1,397	82.03
Dean Martin	306	17.97

== Sioux Lookout ==
Doug Lawrence was acclaimed as mayor of Sioux Lookout.

Mayoral Candidate	Vote	%
Doug Lawrance (X)	Acclaimed	

== Sioux Narrows-Nestor Falls ==
Gale Black was acclaimed as mayor of Sioux Narrows-Nestor Falls.

Mayoral Candidate	Vote	%
Gale Black	Acclaimed	
