= 2022 Haliburton County municipal elections =

Local election in Ontario, Canada

- October 24, 2022

Elections were held in Haliburton County, Ontario on October 24, 2022 in conjunction with municipal elections across the province.

== Haliburton County Council ==
The Haliburton County Council consists of the mayors and deputy mayors of the four constituent municipalities. A warden is elected from the eight members.

Position	Elected
Algonquin Highlands Mayor	Liz Danielsen
Algonquin Highlands Deputy Mayor	(chosen from council)
Dysart et al Mayor	Murray Fearrey (acclaimed)
Dysart et al Deputy Mayor	Walt McKechnie (acclaimed)
Highlands East Mayor	Dave Burton
Highlands East Deputy Mayor	(chosen from council)
Minden Hills Mayor	Bob Carter (acclaimed)
Minden Hills Deputy Mayor	Lisa Schell (acclaimed)

== Algonquin Highlands ==
The following were the results for mayor of Algonquin Highlands.

Mayoral Candidate	Vote	%
Liz Danielsen	1,204	53.09
Mike Lang	1,064	46.91

== Dysart et al ==
Former mayor Murray Fearrey was acclaimed as mayor of Dysart et al.

Mayoral Candidate	Vote	%
Murray Fearrey	Acclaimed	

== Highlands East ==
Mayor Dave Burton ran against Cheryl Ellis in a re-match of the 2018 election.

Mayoral Candidate	Vote	%
Dave Burton (X)	1,117	58.24
Cheryl Ellis	801	41.76

== Minden Hills ==
Township councillor Bob Carter was acclaimed as mayor of Minden Hills.

Mayoral Candidate	Vote	%
Bob Carter	Acclaimed	
