= 2022 Lanark County municipal elections =

Local election in Ontario, Canada

- October 24, 2022

Elections were held in Lanark County, Ontario on October 24, 2022 in conjunction with municipal elections across the province.

== Lanark County Council ==
Lanark County Council consists of two members from each constituent municipality.

Position	Elected
Beckwith Reeve	Richard Kidd (acclaimed)
Beckwith Deputy Reeve	Brian Dowdall
Carleton Place Mayor	Toby Randell
Carleton Place Deputy Mayor	Andrew Tennant
Drummond/North Elmsley Reeve	Steve Fournier (acclaimed)
Drummond/North Elmsley Deputy Reeve	(selected from council)
Lanark Highlands Reeve	Peter McLaren
Lanark Higlands Deputy Reeve	Bill King
Mississippi Mills Mayor	Christa Lowry (acclaimed)
Mississippi Mills Deputy Mayor	Rickey Minnille
Montague Reeve	Karen Jennings
Montague Deputy Reeve	Jeffrey Carroll
Perth Mayor	Judy Brown
Perth Deputy Mayor	Ed McPherson (acclaimed)
Tay Valley Reeve	Rob Rainer
Tay Valley Deputy Reeve	Fred Dobbie

== Beckwith ==
The following were the results for reeve and deputy reeve of Beckwith.

=== Reeve ===
Incumbent reeve Richard Kidd was re-elected by acclamation. He has been reeve since 2000.

Reeve Candidate	Vote	%
Richard Kidd (X)	Acclaimed	

=== Deputy reeve ===
Deputy Reeve Candidate	Vote	%
Brian Dowdall	1,313	68.42
Sharon Mousseau (X)	606	31.58

== Carleton Place ==
The following were the results for mayor and deputy mayor of Carleton Place.

=== Mayor ===
Mayoral Candidate	Vote	%
Toby Randell	1,962	50.09
Doug Black (X)	1,764	45.03
Andreas Foustanellas	191	4.88

=== Deputy mayor ===
Deputy Mayor Candidate	Vote	%
Andrew Tennant	2,393	61.96
Sean Redmond (X)	1,469	38.04

== Drummond/North Elmsley ==
Steve Fournier was re-elected as reeve of Drummond/North Elmsley by acclamation.

=== Reeve ===
Reeve Candidate	Vote	%
Steve Fournier (X)	Acclaimed	

== Lanark Highlands ==
The following were the results for reeve and deputy reeve of Lanark Highlands.

=== Reeve ===
Reeve Candidate	Vote	%
Peter McLaren (X)	1,113	47.63
Wes Pugh	1,043	44.63
James Parsons	181	7.74

=== Deputy reeve ===
Deputy Reeve Candidate	Vote	%
Bill King	1,111	49.69
Adam-Michael Peters	762	34.08
Dennis Munroe	363	16.23

== Mississippi Mills ==
The following were the results for mayor and deputy mayor of Mississippi Mills.

=== Mayor ===
Mayoral Candidate	Vote	%
Christa Lowry (X)	Acclaimed	

=== Deputy mayor ===
Deputy Mayor Candidate	Vote	%
Rickey Minnille (X)	2,099	42.41
Paul Watters	1,797	36.31
David Hinks	1,053	21.28

== Montague ==
The following were the results for reeve and deputy reeve of Montague.

=== Reeve ===
Reeve Candidate	Vote	%
Karen Jennings	638	47.15
Klaas Van Der Meer	384	28.38
Vince Carroll	331	24.46

=== Deputy reeve ===
Deputy Reeve Candidate	Vote	%
Jeffrey Carroll	493	36.55
Pat Dolan	481	35.66
David Marion	375	27.80

== Perth ==
The following were the results for mayor and deputy mayor of Perth.

=== Mayor ===
Mayor John Fenik was challenged by town councillor Judy Brown and businessperson Stephanie Drummond.

Mayoral Candidate	Vote	%
Judy Brown	983	39.88
John Fenik (X)	919	37.28
Stephanie Drummond	563	22.84

=== Deputy mayor ===
Deputy Mayor Candidate	Vote	%
Ed McPherson (X)	Acclaimed	

== Tay Valley ==
The following were the results for reeve and deputy reeve of Tay Valley.

=== Reeve ===
Reeve Candidate	Vote	%
Rob Rainer	1,397	55.30
RoxAnne Darling	1,129	44.70

=== Deputy reeve ===
Deputy Reeve Candidate	Vote	%
Fred Dobbie	1,551	62.54
Gordon Hill	929	37.46
