= 2022 Huron County municipal elections =

Local election in Ontario, Canada

- October 24, 2022

Elections took place in Huron County, Ontario on October 24, 2022, in conjunction with municipal elections across the province.

== Huron County Council ==
Huron County Council consists of the Mayors and Reeves of each constituent municipality, plus deputy mayors, deputy reeves for all municipalities except Howick, Morris-Turnberry and North Huron

| Position | Elected |
|---|---|
| Ashfield-Colborne-Wawanosh Mayor | Glen McNeil (acclaimed) |
| Ashfield-Colborne-Wawanosh Deputy Mayor | Bill Vanstone |
| Bluewater Mayor | Paul Klopp (acclaimed) |
| Bluewater Deputy Mayor | John Becker |
| Central Huron Mayor | Jim Ginn |
| Central Huron Deputy Mayor | Marg Anderson |
| Goderich Mayor | Myles Murdoch |
| Goderich Deputy Mayor | Trevor Bazinet |
| Howick Reeve | Doug Harding (acclaimed) |
| Huron East Mayor | Bernie MacLellan |
| Huron East Deputy Mayor | Alvin McLellan (selected from council) |
| Morris-Turnberry Mayor | Jamie Heffer (acclaimed) |
| North Huron Reeve | Paul Heffer |
| South Huron Mayor | George Finch |
| South Huron Deputy Mayor | Jim Dietrich |

== Ashfield-Colborne-Wawanosh ==
The following were the results for mayor and deputy mayor of Ashfield-Colborne-Wawanosh.

=== Mayor ===
Glen McNeil was re-elected as mayor by acclamation.

| Mayoral Candidate | Vote | % |
|---|---|---|
| Glen McNeil (X) | Acclaimed | |

=== Deputy mayor ===
| Deputy Mayoral Candidate | Vote | % |
|---|---|---|
| Bill Vanstone | 1,480 | 64.88 |
| Roger Watt (X) | 801 | 35.12 |

== Bluewater ==
The following were the results for mayor and deputy mayor of Bluewater.

=== Mayor ===
Incumbent mayor Paul Klopp was re-elected by acclamation for a second term.

| Mayoral Candidate | Vote | % |
|---|---|---|
| Paul Klopp (X) | Acclaimed | |

=== Deputy mayor ===
| Deputy Mayoral Candidate | Vote | % |
|---|---|---|
| John Becker | 1,375 | 50.40 |
| Alwyn Vanden Berg | 1,353 | 49.60 |

== Central Huron ==
The following were the results for mayor and deputy mayor of Central Huron.

=== Mayor ===
| Mayoral Candidate | Vote | % |
|---|---|---|
| Jim Ginn (X) | 1,257 | 52.29 |
| David Jewitt | 1,147 | 47.71 |

=== Deputy mayor ===
| Deputy Mayoral Candidate | Vote | % |
|---|---|---|
| Marg Anderson | 1,477 | 62.11 |
| Jared Petteplace | 901 | 37.89 |

== Goderich ==
The following were the results for mayor and deputy mayor of Goderich.

=== Mayor ===
| Mayoral Candidate | Vote | % |
|---|---|---|
| Myles Murdock | 1,844 | 55.21 |
| Matt Hoy | 1,496 | 44.79 |

=== Deputy mayor ===
| Deputy Mayoral Candidate | Vote | % |
|---|---|---|
| Trevor Bazinet | 1,985 | 59.79 |
| Stephen Tamming | 1,335 | 40.21 |

== Howick ==
Doug Harding was re-elected by acclamation as reeve of Howick.

=== Reeve ===
| Reeve Candidate | Vote | % |
|---|---|---|
| Doug Harding (X) | Acclaimed | |

== Huron East ==
The following were the results for mayor of Huron East.

=== Mayor ===
| Mayoral Candidate | Vote | % |
|---|---|---|
| Bernie MacLellan (X) | 15,95 | 70.14 |
| Nancy Craig | 679 | 29.86 |

== Morris-Turnberry ==
Jamie Heffer was re-elected mayor of Morris-Turnberry by acclamation.

=== Mayor ===
| Mayoral Candidate | Vote | % |
|---|---|---|
| Jamie Heffer (X) | Acclaimed | |

== North Huron ==
Incumbent mayor Bernie Bailey was challenged by deputy reeve Trevor Seip. The following candidates are running for reeve of North Huron.

=== Reeve ===
| Reeve Candidate | Vote | % |
|---|---|---|
| Paul Heffer | 810 | 44.33 |
| Trevor Seip | 569 | 31.14 |
| Bernie Bailey (X) | 410 | 22.44 |
| Ranko Markeljevic | 38 | 2.08 |

== South Huron ==
The following were the results for mayor and deputy mayor of South Huron.

=== Mayor ===
| Mayoral Candidate | Vote | % |
|---|---|---|
| George Finch (X) | 2,073 | 57.92 |
| Maureen Cole | 1,506 | 42.08 |

=== Deputy mayor ===
| Deputy Mayoral Candidate | Vote | % |
|---|---|---|
| Jim Dietrich (X) | 2,189 | 62.06 |
| Karen Brown | 1,338 | 37.94 |
