= 2022 Rainy River District municipal elections =

- October 24, 2022

Elections were held in the organized municipalities in the Rainy River District of Ontario on October 24, 2022 in conjunction with municipal elections across the province.

== Alberton ==
The following were the results for reeve of Alberton.

Reeve Candidate	Vote	%
Mike Ford (X)	194	57.06
Michael Hammond	146	42.94

== Atikokan ==
The following were the results for mayor of Atikokan.

Mayoral Candidate	Vote	%
Rob Ferguson	788	71.38
Robbin Harper	316	28.62

== Chapple ==
James Franklin Gibson was acclaimed as reeve of Chapple.

Reeve Candidate	Vote	%
James Gibson	Acclaimed	

== Dawson ==
Douglas Hartnell was acclaimed as mayor of Dawson.

Mayoral Candidate	Vote	%
Douglas Hartnell	Acclaimed	

== Emo ==
Harold McQuaker was acclaimed as mayor of Emo.

Mayoral Candidate	Vote	%
Harold McQuaker (X)	Acclaimed	

== Fort Frances ==
The following were the results for mayor of Fort Frances.

Mayoral Candidate	Vote	%
Andrew Hallikas	1,573	60.45
Ken Perry	1,029	39.55

== Lake of the Woods ==
Colleen Fadden was acclaimed as mayor of Lake of the Woods.

Mayoral Candidate	Vote	%
Colleen Fadden (X)	Acclaimed	

== La Vallee ==
The following were the results for reeve of La Vallee.

Reeve Candidate	Vote	%
Lucille MacDonald	128	44.14
Emily Watson	87	30.00
Kenneth Hyatt	75	25.86

== Morley ==
George Heyens was acclaimed as reeve of Morley.

Reeve Candidate	Vote	%
George Heyens (X)	Acclaimed	

== Rainy River ==
Deborah J. Ewald was acclaimed as mayor of Rainy River.

Mayoral Candidate	Vote	%
Deborah J. Ewald (X)	Acclaimed	
