= 2022 Bruce County municipal elections =

Ontario elections

- October 24, 2022

Elections were held in Bruce County, Ontario on October 24, 2022, in conjunction with municipal elections across the province.

== Bruce County Council ==
Bruce County Council consists of the mayors of the constituent municipalities.

Municipality	Mayor
Arran-Elderslie	Steve Hammell (acclaimed)
Brockton	Chris Peabody (acclaimed)
Huron-Kinloss	Don Murray
Kincardine	Kenneth Craig
Northern Bruce Peninsula	Milt McIver
Saugeen Shores	Luke Charbonneau (acclaimed)
South Bruce	Mark Goetz
South Bruce Peninsula	Garry Michi

== Arran-Elderslie ==
Steve Hammell has been re-elected mayor of Arran-Elderslie by acclamation.

Mayoral Candidate	Vote	%
Steve Hammell (X)	Acclaimed	

== Brockton ==
Christopher Peabody was re-elected as mayor of Brockton by acclamation.

Mayoral Candidate	Vote	%
Christopher Peabody (X)	Acclaimed	

== Huron-Kinloss ==
Incumbent mayor Mitch Twolan did not run for re-election. Deputy mayor Don Murray, Roxy Bergman and Angela Thompkins ran to replace him.

Mayoral Candidate	Vote	%
Don Murray	1,650	55.54
Angela Thompkins	1,248	42.01
Roxy Bergman	73	2.46

== Kincardine ==
The following were the results for mayor of Kincardine.

Mayoral Candidate	Vote	%
Kenneth Craig	2,776	59.30
Laura Haight	1,905	40.70

== Northern Bruce Peninsula ==
Milt McIver, who has been mayor of the municipality since its creation in 1999, and the reeve of Lindsay Township for 17 years prior to that, was challenged by Karen Phillips.

Mayoral Candidate	Vote	%
Milt McIver (X)	2,424	69.02
Karen Phillips	1,088	30.98

== Saugeen Shores ==
Luke Charbonneau was re-elected as mayor of Saugeen Shores by acclamation.

Mayoral Candidate	Vote	%
Luke Charbonneau (X)	Acclaimed	

== South Bruce ==
The following were the results for mayor of South Bruce.

Mayoral Candidate	Vote	%
Mark Goetz	1,311	45.41
Rita Groen	788	27.29
Robert Buckle (X)	788	27.29

== South Bruce Peninsula ==
The following were the results for mayor of South Bruce Peninsula.

Mayoral Candidate	Vote	%
Garry Michi	2,853	52.10
Janice Jackson (X)	2,491	45.49
Donald E. Tedford	132	2.41
