= 2022 Parry Sound District municipal elections =

- October 24, 2022

Elections were held in the organized municipalities in the Parry Sound District of Ontario on October 24, 2022 in conjunction with municipal elections across the province.

== The Archipelago ==
Bert Liverance was re-elected reeve of The Archipelago by acclamation.

Reeve Candidate	Vote	%
Bert Liverance (X)	Acclaimed	

== Armour ==
Ron Ward was elected mayor of Armour by acclamation.

Mayoral Candidate	Vote	%
Ron Ward	Acclaimed	

== Burk's Falls ==
The following were the results for mayor of Burk's Falls.

Mayoral Candidate	Vote	%
Chris Hope	176	57.70
Cathy Still (X)	129	42.30

== Callander ==
Mayor Robb Noon was challenged by municipal councillor Daryl Vaillancourt and Gay Smylie.

Mayoral Candidate	Vote	%
Robb Noon (X)	674	40.77
Gay Smylie	532	32.18
Daryl Vaillancourt	447	27.04

== Carling ==
The following were the results for mayor of Carling.

Mayoral Candidate	Vote	%
Susan Murphy	664	48.64
Elisabeth McWalter	460	33.70
Gary Bauer	241	17.66

== Joly ==
Brian McCabe was elected mayor of Joly by acclamation.

Mayoral Candidate	Vote	%
Brian McCabe	Acclaimed	

== Kearney ==
The following were the results for mayor of Kearney.

Mayoral Candidate	Vote	%
Cheryl Philip	586	56.78
Lance Thrale	405	39.24
Douglas Boyce	41	3.97

== Machar ==
The following were the results for mayor of Machar.

Mayoral Candidate	Vote	%
Lynda Carleton (X)	495	55.00
Bart Wood	405	45.00

== Magnetawan ==
The following were the results for mayor of Magnetawan.

Mayoral Candidate	Vote	%
Sam Dunnett (X)	700	62.28
Michael Gebhardt	424	37.72

== McDougall ==
The following were the results for mayor of McDougall.

Mayoral Candidate	Vote	%
Dale Robinson (X)	933	63.21
Mike Barker	543	36.79

== McKellar ==
The following were the results for mayor of McKellar.

Reeve Candidate	Vote	%
David Moore	671	42.71
Ron Harrison	585	37.24
Michel Richard	315	20.05

== McMurrich/Monteith ==
The following candidates are running for reeve of McMurrich/Monteith.

Reeve Candidate	Vote	%
Glynn Robinson	391	62.16
Angela Friesen (X)	238	37.84

== Nipissing ==
Thomas C. Piper was re-elected as mayor of Nipissing by acclamation.

Mayoral Candidate	Vote	%
Thomas C. Piper (X)	Acclaimed	

== Parry Sound ==
The following were the results for mayor of Parry Sound.

Mayoral Candidate	Vote	%
Jamie McGarvey (X)	1,282	58.83
Vanessa Backman	693	31.80
Eric Hansman	204	9.36

== Perry ==
Norm Hofstetter was re-elected as mayor of Perry by acclamation.

Mayoral Candidate	Vote	%
Norm Hofstetter (X)	Acclaimed	

== Powassan ==
The following were the results for mayor of Powassan.

Mayoral Candidate	Vote	%
Peter McIsaac (X)	690	58.23
Peter Brushey	495	41.77

== Ryerson ==
Mayoral Candidate	Vote	%
George Douglas Sterling	273	57.35
Trevor James	103	21.64
Penny Brandt	100	21.01

== Seguin ==
Ann MacDiarmid was re-elected by acclamation.

Mayoral Candidate	Vote	%
Ann MacDiarmid (X)	Acclaimed	

== South River ==
Jim Coleman was re-elected mayor of South River by acclamation.

Mayoral Candidate	Vote	%
Jim Coleman (X)	Acclaimed	

== Strong ==
The following were the results for mayor of Strong.

Mayoral Candidate	Vote	%
Tim Bryson	354	38.65
Jody Baillie	269	29.37
Albert Lilley	182	19.87
Jason Cottrell	111	12.12

== Sundridge ==
The following were the results for mayor of Sundridge.

Mayoral Candidate	Vote	%
Justine Leveque	245	54.81
Steven Hicks	127	28.41
Barbara Belrose	75	16.78

== Whitestone ==
George Comrie was re-elected mayor of Whitestone by acclamation.

Mayoral Candidate	Vote	%
George Comrie (X)	Acclaimed	
