= 2022 Muskoka District municipal elections =

- October 24, 2022

Elections were held in the Muskoka District Municipality of Ontario on October 24, 2022 in conjunction with municipal elections across the province.

== Muskoka District Council ==
The Muskoka District Council, is made up of a 23 member council which includes the mayors of its six municipalities, three councillors each from Bracebridge, Gravenhurst, Huntsville and Muskoka Lakes, two each from Lake of Bays and Georgian Bay, plus a District Chair which is elected by council following the election.

Position	Elected
Chair
Bracebridge
Mayor	Rick Maloney
District Councillor	Don Smith
District Councillor	Brenda Rhodes
District Councillor	Tatiana Sutherland
Georgian Bay
Mayor	Peter Koetsier (acclaimed)
District Councillor, Wards 1 & 3	Brian Bochek (acclaimed)
District Councillor, Wards 2 & 4	Peter Cooper (acclaimed)
Gravenhurst
Mayor	Heidi Lorenz
District Councillor	Sandy Cairns
District Councillor	Erin Strength
District Councillor	Peter M. Johnston
Huntsville
Mayor	Nancy Alcock
District Councillor	Scott Morrison
District Councillor	Dan Armour
District Councillor	Bob Stone
Lake of Bays
Mayor	Terry Glover
District Councillor, Franklin & Sinclair Wards	Mike Peppard
District Councillor, Ridout & McLean Wards	Robert Lacroix (acclaimed)
Muskoka Lakes
Mayor	Peter Kelley
District Councillor, Ward 1	Ruth Nishikawa (acclaimed)
District Councillor, Ward 2	Allen Edwards (acclaimed)
District Councillor, Ward 3	Guy Burry (acclaimed)

== Bracebridge ==
The following were the results for mayor and district council in Bracebridge.

=== Mayor ===
Candidate	Vote	%
Rick Maloney (X)	3,140	52.76
Mike Opara	1,596	26.82
Paul Campbell	1,215	20.42

=== District Councillors ===
Three to be elected.

Candidate	Vote	%
Don Smith (X)	3,279	21.48
Brenda Rhodes	3,452	22.62
Tatiana Sutherland	3,161	20.71
Mark Quemby (X)	2,922	19.14
Steven Clement (X)	2,449	16.05

== Georgian Bay ==
The following were the results for mayor and district council in Georgian Bay.

=== Mayor ===
Candidate	Vote	%
Peter Koetsier (X)	Acclaimed	

=== District Councillors ===
Candidate	Vote	%
Wards 1 & 3
Brian Bochek	Acclaimed	
Wards 2 & 4
Peter Cooper (X)	Acclaimed	

== Gravenhurst ==
The following were the results for mayor and district council in Gravenhurst.

=== Mayor ===
Incumbent mayor Paul Kelly did not run for re-election. Deputy mayor Heidi Lorenz ran against town councillor Terry Pilger, and Marc Mantha.

Candidate	Vote	%
Heidi Lorenz	2,155	43.97
Terry Pilger	1,937	39.52
Marc Mantha	809	16.51

=== District Councillors ===
Three to be elected.

Candidate	Vote	%
Sandy Cairns (X)	3,186	26.50
Erin Strength	2,005	16.67
Peter M. Johnston	1,833	15.24
Jaden Hollingshead	1,691	14.06
John Gordon (X)	1,686	14.02
Gordie Merton	838	6.97
Allan J. Kent	596	4.96
Bryant Halsall	189	1.57

== Huntsville ==
The following were the results for mayor and district council in Huntsville.

=== Mayor ===
Mayor Karin Terziano did not run for re-election. Running to replace her were Deputy Mayor Nancy Alcock, district councillor Tim Withey and former fire chief Stephen Hernen. Terziano was acclaimed to the position in 2019 when previous mayor Scott Atchison was elected to Parliament.

Candidate	Vote	%
Nancy Alcock	3,379	44.20
Stephen Hernen	2,208	28.88
Tim Withey	1,927	25.21
Reuben Pyette-Bouillon	131	1.71

=== District Councillors ===
Three to be elected.

Candidate	Vote	%
Scott Morrison	5,025	27.15
Dan Armour	4,994	27.15
Bob Stone	3,849	20.92
Kathleen May	2,440	13.26
Chris Occhiuzzi	2,089	11.36

== Lake of Bays ==
The following were the results for mayor and district council in Lake of Bays.

=== Mayor ===
Incumbent mayor Terry Glover was challenged by former Port Hope mayor Linda Thompson.

Candidate	Vote	%
Terry Glover (X)	1,401	58.52
Linda Thompson	993	41.48

=== District Councillors ===
Candidate	Vote	%
Franklin & Sinclair Wards
Mike Peppard (X)	574	46.74
Charles Cooper	456	37.13
Martin Mann	198	16.12
Ridout & McLean Wards
Robert Lacroix (X)	Acclaimed	

== Muskoka Lakes ==
The following were the results for mayor and district council in Muskoka Lakes.

=== Mayor ===
Candidate	Vote	%
Peter Kelley	3,676	60.59
Phil Harding (X)	2,391	39.41

=== District Councillors ===
Candidate	Vote	%
Ward A
Ruth Nishikawa (X)	Acclaimed	
Ward B
Allen Edwards (X)	Acclaimed	
Ward C
Guy Burry	Acclaimed	
