= 2022 Middlesex County municipal elections =

Local election in Ontario, Canada

Elections were held in Middlesex County, Ontario on October 24, 2022, in conjunction with municipal elections across the province.

== Middlesex County Council ==
Middlesex County Council consists of the mayors of each municipality (except Newbury) plus the deputy mayors of the municipalities with over 5,000 electors.

Position	Elected
Adelaide Metcalfe Mayor	Susan Clarke (acclaimed)
Lucan Biddulph Mayor	Cathy Burghardt-Jesson
Middlesex Centre Mayor	Aina DeViet (acclaimed)
Middlesex Centre Deputy Mayor	John Brennan (acclaimed)
North Middlesex Mayor	Brian Ropp (acclaimed)
North Middlesex Deputy Mayor	Paul Hodgins (acclaimed)
Southwest Middlesex Mayor	Allan Mayhew
Southwest Middlesex Deputy Mayor	Mike Sholdice
Strathroy Caradoc Mayor	Colin Grantham
Strathroy Caradoc Deputy Mayor	Mike McGuire
Thames Centre Mayor	Sharron McMillan
Thames Centre Deputy Mayor	Michelle Smibert

== Adelaide Metcalfe ==
=== Mayor ===
Susan Clarke was elected mayor of Adelaide Metcalfe by acclamation.

Mayoral Candidate	Vote	%
Susan Clarke	Acclaimed	

== Lucan Biddulph ==
=== Mayor ===
The following were the results mayor of Lucan Biddulph. Mayor Cathy Burghardt-Jesson was challenged by political newcomer Allan Cunningham.

Mayoral Candidate	Vote	%
Cathy Burghardt-Jesson (X)	1,018	53.98
Allan Cunningham	868	46.02

== Middlesex Centre ==
The following were the results for mayor and deputy mayor of Middlesex Centre.

=== Mayor ===
Mayoral Candidate	Vote	%
Aina DeViet (X)	Acclaimed	

=== Deputy mayor ===
Deputy mayoral candidate	Vote	%
John Brennan (X)	Acclaimed	

== Newbury ==
=== Mayor ===
Mayoral Candidate	Vote	%
Dianne Brewer (X)	Acclaimed	

== North Middlesex ==
The following were the results for mayor and deputy mayor of North Middlesex.

=== Mayor ===
Mayoral Candidate	Vote	%
Brian Ropp (X)	Acclaimed	

=== Deputy mayor ===
Deputy mayoral candidate	Vote	%
Paul Hodgins	Acclaimed	

== Southwest Middlesex ==
The following were the results for mayor and deputy mayor of Southwest Middlesex.

=== Mayor ===
Mayoral Candidate	Vote	%
Allan Mayhew (X)	1,434	64.33
Marigay Wilkins	795	35.67

=== Deputy mayor ===
Deputy mayoral candidate	Vote	%
Mike Sholdice	1,594	72.16
Christa Cowell	615	27.84

== Strathroy-Caradoc ==
The following were the results for mayor and deputy mayor of Strathroy-Caradoc.

=== Mayor ===
Mayoral Candidate	Vote	%
Colin Grantham	4,032	57.96
Joanne Vanderheyden (X)	2,682	38.56
Brad Bock	115	1.65
Daniel Berdan	127	1.83

=== Deputy mayor ===
Deputy mayoral candidate	Vote	%
Mike McGuire	3,540	52.44
Brad Richards (X)	3,210	47.56

== Thames Centre ==
The following were the results for mayor and deputy mayor of Thames Centre.

=== Mayor ===
Mayoral Candidate	Vote	%
Sharron McMillan	2,683	51.61
Kelly Elliott	2,429	46.72
Vince Nichol	87	1.67

=== Deputy mayor ===
Deputy mayoral candidate	Vote	%
Michelle Smibert	3,082	60.49
Paul Hunter	2,013	39.51
