= 2022 Elgin County municipal elections =

- October 24, 2022

Elections were held in Elgin County, Ontario on October 24, 2022 in conjunction with municipal elections across the province.

== Elgin County Council ==
Elgin County Council consists of the mayors of the constituent municipalities plus the deputy mayors of Central Elgin and Malahide.

| Position | Elected |
|---|---|
| Aylmer Mayor | Jack Couckuyt |
| Bayham Mayor | Ed Ketchabaw |
| Central Elgin Mayor | Andrew Sloan |
| Central Elgin Deputy Mayor | Todd Noble |
| Dutton/Dunwich Mayor | Mike Hentz |
| Malahide Mayor | Dominique Giguère (acclaimed) |
| Malahide Deputy Mayor | Mark Widner (acclaimed) |
| Southwold Mayor | Grant Jones |
| West Elgin Mayor | Duncan McPhail (acclaimed) |

== Aylmer ==
The following were the results for mayor of Aylmer.

=== Mayor ===
| Mayoral Candidate | Vote | % |
|---|---|---|
| Jack Couckuyt | 712 | 41.86 |
| Ted McDonald | 539 | 31.69 |
| Tom Charlton | 450 | 26.46 |

== Bayham ==
The following were the results for mayor of Bayham.

=== Mayor ===
| Mayoral Candidate | Vote | % |
|---|---|---|
| Ed Ketchabaw (X) | 864 | 62.02 |
| Jon Culford | 529 | 37.98 |

== Central Elgin ==
The following were the results for mayor and deputy mayor of Central Elgin.

=== Mayor ===
Incumbent mayor Sally Martyn did not run for re-election. Running to replace her were Ward 2 councillor Dennis Creivits and deputy mayor Tom Marks.

| Mayoral Candidate | Vote | % |
|---|---|---|
| Andrew Sloan | 1,807 | 43.31 |
| Dennis Crevits | 1,192 | 28.57 |
| Tom Marks | 845 | 20.25 |
| Casey Siebenmorgen | 328 | 7.86 |

=== Deputy mayor ===
| Deputy Mayoral Candidate | Vote | % |
|---|---|---|
| Todd Noble | 1,740 | 43.60 |
| Colleen Row | 1,665 | 41.72 |
| Bill Harrington | 586 | 14.68 |

== Dutton/Dunwich ==
Incumbent mayor Bob Purcell did not run for re-election. Running to replace him were deputy mayor Mike Hentz and Phil Gibson.

=== Mayor ===
| Mayoral Candidate | Vote | % |
|---|---|---|
| Mike Hentz | 716 | 70.96 |
| Phil Gibson | 293 | 29.04 |

== Malahide ==
The following were the results for mayor and deputy mayor of Malahide.

=== Mayor ===
| Mayoral Candidate | Vote | % |
|---|---|---|
| Dominique Giguère | Acclaimed | |

=== Deputy mayor ===
| Deputy Mayoral Candidate | Vote | % |
|---|---|---|
| Mark Widner | Acclaimed | |

== Southwold ==
The following were the results for mayor of Southwold.

=== Mayor ===
| Mayoral Candidate | Vote | % |
|---|---|---|
| Grant Jones (X) | 885 | 58.45 |
| Robert Monteith | 629 | 41.55 |

== West Elgin ==
Duncan McPhail was re-elected as mayor of West Elgin by acclamation.

| Mayoral Candidate | Vote | % |
|---|---|---|
| Duncan McPhail (X) | Acclaimed | |
