= 2022 Hastings County municipal elections =

Local election in Ontario, Canada

- October 24, 2022

Elections were held in Hastings County, Ontario on October 24, 2022, in conjunction with municipal elections across the province.

== Hastings County Council ==
Hastings County Council consists of the mayors and reeves of the 14 constituent municipalities.

Elected	Position
Bancroft Mayor	Paul Jenkins
Carlow/Mayo Mayor	Randy Wallace
Centre Hastings Mayor	Tom Deline (acclaimed)
Deseronto Mayor	Dan Johnston (acclaimed)
Faraday Mayor	Dennis Purcell (acclaimed)
Hastings Highlands Mayor	Tony Fitzgerald
Limerick Mayor	Kim Carson
Madoc Mayor	Loyde Blackburn
Marmora and Lake Mayor	Jan O'Neill
Stirling-Rawdon Mayor	Bob Mullin
Tudor and Cashel Mayor	Dave Hederson
Tweed Mayor	Don DeGenova (acclaimed)
Tyendinaga Reeve	Claire Kennelly
Wollaston Mayor	Michael Fuerth

== Bancroft ==
The following were the results for mayor of Bancroft.

Mayoral Candidate	Vote	%
Paul Jenkins (X)	697	47.38
Scott Munro	585	39.77
Michael Anderson	189	12.85

== Carlow/Mayo ==
The following were the results for mayor of Carlow/Mayo.

Mayoral Candidate	Vote	%
Randy Wallace	350	59.63
Bonnie Adams (X)	237	40.37

== Centre Hastings ==
Tom Deline was re-elected mayor of Centre Hastings by acclamation.

Mayoral Candidate	Vote	%
Tom Deline (X)	Acclaimed	

== Deseronto ==
Dan Johnston was re-elected mayor of Deseronto by acclamation.

Mayoral Candidate	Vote	%
Dan Johnston (X)	Acclaimed	

== Faraday ==
Dennis Purcell was re-elected mayor of Faraday by acclamation.

Mayoral Candidate	Vote	%
Dennis Purcell (X)	Acclaimed	

== Hastings Highlands ==
The following were the results for mayor of Hastings Highlands.

Mayoral Candidate	Vote	%
Tony Fitzgerald	1,130	46.27
Dorothy Gerrow	871	35.67
Frank Hickey	441	18.06

== Limerick ==
The following were the results for mayor of Limerick.

Mayoral Candidate	Vote	%
Kim Carson	326	54.88
Carl Stefanski (X)	268	45.12

== Madoc ==
The following were the results for mayor of Madoc.

Mayoral Candidate	Vote	%
Loyde Blackburn (X)	516	70.01
Matt Walker	221	29.99

== Marmora and Lake ==
The following were the results for mayor of Marmora and Lake.

Mayoral Candidate	Vote	%
Jan O'Neill (X)	1,097	62.47
Bonnie Danes	659	37.53

== Stirling-Rawdon ==
The following were the results for mayor of Stirling-Rawdon.

Mayoral Candidate	Vote	%
Bob Mullin (X)	1,058	64.99
Bill Ficioris	570	35.01

== Tudor and Cashel ==
The following were the results for mayor of Tudor and Cashel.

Reeve Candidate	Vote	%
Dave Hederson	382	57.01
Libby Clarke (X)	288	42.99

== Tweed ==
Don DeGenova was acclaimed as mayor of Tweed.

Mayoral Candidate	Vote	%
Don DeGenova	Acclaimed	

== Tyendinaga ==
The following were the results for reeve of Tyendinaga.

Reeve Candidate	Vote	%
Claire Kennelly	649	53.33
Adam Hannafin	568	46.67

== Wollaston ==
The following were the results for mayor of Wollaston.

Mayoral Candidate	Vote	%
Michael Fuerth	699	70.53
Lynn Kruger (X)	292	29.47
