= 2022 Leeds and Grenville United Counties municipal elections =

- October 24, 2022

Elections were held in Leeds and Grenville United Counties, Ontario on October 24, 2022, in conjunction with municipal elections across the province.

== Leeds and Grenville United Counties Council ==
The Leeds and Grenville United Counties Council consists of the mayors of the constituent municipalities.

Position	Elected
Athens Mayor	Herb Scott
Augusta Mayor	Jeff Shaver
Edwardsburgh/Cardinal Mayor	Tory Deschamps
Elizabethtown-Kitley Mayor	Brant Burrow
Front of Yonge Mayor	Roger Haley (acclaimed)
Leeds and the Thousand Islands Mayor	Corinna Smith-Gatcke (acclaimed)
Merrickville-Wolford Mayor	Michael Cameron
North Grenville Mayor	Nancy Peckford
Rideau Lakes Mayor	Arie Hoogenboom
Westport Mayor	Robin Jones

== Athens ==
The following were the results for mayor of Athens.

Mayoral Candidate	Vote	%
Herb Scott (X)	421	67.58
John Bouwers	202	32.42

== Augusta ==
Incumbent mayor Doug Malankar was challenged by deputy mayor Jeff Shaver.

Mayoral Candidate	Vote	%
Jeff Shaver	1,172	51.72
Doug Malanka (X)	1,094	48.28

== Edwardsburgh/Cardinal ==
Incumbent mayor Pat Sayeau was challenged by deputy mayor Tory Deschamps.

Mayoral Candidate	Vote	%
Tory Deschamps	1,585	59.90
Pat Sayeau (X)	1,061	40.10

== Elizabethtown-Kitley ==
The following were the results for mayor of Elizabethtown-Kitley.

Mayoral Candidate	Vote	%
Brant Burrow (X)	1,529	56.46
Dan Downey	1,179	43.54

== Front of Yonge ==
Roger Haley was re-elected as mayor of Front of Yonge by acclamation.

Mayoral Candidate	Vote	%
Roger Haley (X)	Acclaimed	

== Leeds and the Thousand Islands ==
Incumbent mayor Corinna Smith-Gatcke was re-elected by acclamation.

Mayoral Candidate	Vote	%
Corinna Smith-Gatcke (X)	Acclaimed	

== Merrickville-Wolford ==
Incumbent mayor Doug Struthers was challenged by former deputy mayor Anne Barr and incumbent deputy mayor Michael Cameron.

Mayoral Candidate	Vote	%
Michael Cameron	680	44.27
Anne Barr	621	40.43
Doug Struthers (X)	235	15.30

== North Grenville ==
The following were the results for mayor of North Grenville.

Mayoral Candidate	Vote	%
Nancy Peckford (X)	4,410	75.31
Colleen Lynas	1,446	24.69

== Rideau Lakes ==
The following were the results for mayor of Rideau Lakes.

Mayoral Candidate	Vote	%
Arie Hoogenboom (X)	2,995	71.74
Carolyn Bresee	1,180	28.26

== Westport ==
The following were the results for mayor of Westport.

Mayoral Candidate	Vote	%
Robin Jones (X)	291	64.10
Frank Huth	163	35.90
