= 2022 Timiskaming District municipal elections =

- October 24, 2022

Elections were held in the organized municipalities in the Timiskaming District of Ontario on October 24, 2022 in conjunction with municipal elections across the province.

== Armstrong ==
Jean Marc Boileau was re-elected mayor of Armstrong by acclamation.

Mayoral Candidate	Vote	%
Jean Marc Boileau (X)	Acclaimed	

== Brethour ==
Reeve Candidate	Vote	%
David Wight (X)	Acclaimed	

== Casey ==
Guy Labonté was re-elected as reeve of Casey by acclamation.

Reeve Candidate	Vote	%
Guy Labonté (X)	Acclaimed	

== Chamberlain ==
Kerry Stewart was re-elected reeve of Chamberlain by acclamation.

Reeve Candidate	Vote	%
Kerry Stewart (X)	Acclaimed	

== Charlton and Dack ==
Sandra Dawn Perkin was elected reeve of Charlton and Dack by acclamation.

Reeve Candidate	Vote	%
Sandra Dawn Perkin	Acclaimed	

== Cobalt ==
The following were the results for mayor of Cobalt.

Mayoral Candidate	Vote	%
Mita Gibson	135	36.59
Angela Adshead	101	27.37
Rod Prior	99	26.83
Mike Harrison	34	9.21

== Coleman ==
The following were the results for mayor of Coleman.

Mayoral Candidate	Vote	%
Dan Cleroux (X)	235	53.90
Mitch Lafreniere	201	46.10

== Englehart ==
The following were the results for mayor of Englehart.

Mayoral Candidate	Vote	%
Jerry Mikovitch	329	69.85
Nina Wallace (X)	142	30.15

== Evanturel ==
Derek Mundle was re-elected reeve of Evanturel by acclamation.

Reeve Candidate	Vote	%
Derek Mundle (X)	Acclaimed	

== Gauthier ==
Reeve Candidate	Vote	%
Paul Binnendyk	Acclaimed	

== Harley ==
Reeve Candidate	Vote	%
Pauline Archambault (X)	Acclaimed	

== Harris ==
The following were the results for reeve of Harris.

Reeve Candidate	Vote	%
Chantal Despres (X)	83	73.45
Rick McLean	30	26.55

== Hilliard ==
Laurie Bolesworth was re-elected reeve of Hilliard by acclamation.

Reeve Candidate	Vote	%
Laurie Bolesworth (X)	Acclaimed	

== Hudson ==
Larry Craig was re-elected reeve of Hudson by acclamation.

Reeve Candidate	Vote	%
Larry Craig (X)	Acclaimed	

== James ==
The following were the results for reeve of James.

Reeve Candidate	Vote	%
Roger Donaldson	97	34.89
Jim Young	88	31.65
Terry Fiset	60	21.58
Fred Pritchard	33	11.87

== Kerns ==
Terry Phillips was re-elected reeve of Kerns by acclamation.

Reeve Candidate	Vote	%
Terry Phillips (X)	Acclaimed	

== Kirkland Lake ==
Mayor Pat Kiely opted to run for a council seat rather than for re-election. The following were the results for mayor of Kirkland Lake.

Mayoral Candidate	Vote	%
Stacy Wight	964	58.67
Don Snow	679	41.33

== Larder Lake ==
Patty Quinn was re-elected mayor of Larder Lake by acclamation.

Mayoral Candidate	Vote	%
Patty Quinn (X)	Acclaimed	

== Latchford ==
The following were the results for mayor of Latchford.

Mayoral Candidate	Vote	%
Sharon Gadoury-East	135	57.94
Francine Blowe	98	42.06

== Matachewan ==
The following were the results for mayor of Matachewan.

Reeve Candidate	Vote	%
Mark Stickel	146	77.66
Anne Commando-Dubé (X)	42	22.34

== McGarry ==
The following were the results for mayor of McGarry.

Mayoral Candidate	Vote	%
Stephen McLean	198	56.41
Matt Reimer (X)	107	30.48
Linda Lamarre	46	13.11

== Temiskaming Shores ==
The following were the results for mayor of Temiskaming Shores.

Mayoral Candidate	Vote	%
Jeff Laferriere	1,556	46.10
Darren Woods	1,088	32.24
Chuck Durrant	672	19.91
Michael Woods	59	1.75

== Thornloe ==
Reeve Candidate	Vote	%
Wayne Miller	Acclaimed	
