= 2022 Sudbury District municipal elections =

- October 24, 2022

Elections were held in the organized municipalities in the Sudbury District of Ontario on October 24, 2022 in conjunction with municipal elections across the province.

== Baldwin ==
Mayoral Candidate	Vote	%
Vern Gorham (X)	Acclaimed	

Jason Cote, Gerald Lepine, Ray Maltais and Bert McDowell were elected to council.

== Chapleau ==
Chapleau was one of numerous municipalities in the province where there were no elections held; as each position on council saw only one registered candidate by the close of nominations, the entire council was directly acclaimed to office.

Mayoral Candidate	Vote	%
Ryan Bignucolo	Acclaimed	

Councillors are Alex Lambruschini, Paul Bernier, Catherine Ansara and Lisi Bernier.

== Espanola ==
Incumbent mayor Jill Beer did not run for re-election. Candidates that ran to replace her included former mayor Ron Piche and former councillor Maureen Van Alstine.

Mayoral Candidate	Vote	%
Douglas Gervais	1,030	61.16
Dennis Lendrum	312	18.53
Maureen Van Alstine	203	12.05
Ron Piche	139	8.25

Angela Kelly, Aidan Kallioinen, John Nadeau, Sandra Hayden, Gerry Massicotte and Ken Duplessis were elected to council.

== French River ==
Gisèle Pageau was re-elected mayor of French River by acclamation.

Mayoral Candidate	Vote	%
Gisèle Pageau (X)	Acclaimed	

== Killarney ==
The only contested race in Killarney was for Ward 1, with five candidates for the three seats. The mayor and both Ward 2 councillors were acclaimed.

Mayoral Candidate	Vote	%
Michael Reider	Acclaimed	

The council will consist of Rob Campbell, Dave Froats and Peggy Roque in Ward 1, and Nicola Grubic and Mary Bradbury in Ward 2.

== Markstay-Warren ==
Ned Whynott was elected as mayor of Markstay-Warren by acclamation.

Mayoral Candidate	Vote	%
Ned Whynott	Acclaimed	

== Nairn and Hyman ==
Mayoral Candidate	Vote	%
Amy Mazey	152	76.77
Seppo J. Vataja	46	23.23

Wayne Austin, Guy Despatie, Rod MacDonald and Trevor McVey were elected to council.

== Sables-Spanish Rivers ==
Mayoral Candidate	Vote	%
Kevin Burke	741	69.71
Marty Martel	257	24.18
Robert Stankie	65	6.11

Mike Mercieca, Harold Crabs, Edith Fairbairn, Cheryl Phillips and Casimir Burns were elected to council.

== St. Charles ==
The following were the results for mayor of St. Charles.

Mayoral Candidate	Vote	%
Paul Branconnier	506	56.28
Paul Schoppmann (X)	393	43.72
