= 2022 Ontario municipal elections =

Canadian election

- October 24, 2022
- Turnout: 32.9% average (▼5.4%)

The 2022 municipal elections in Ontario were held on October 24, 2022.

Voters in the province of Ontario elected mayors, councillors, school board trustees and all other elected officials in all of the province's municipalities. The election date coincided with the religious festival of Diwali.

In total, 32 of Ontario's 444 municipalities did not hold elections, as their entire councils were elected by acclamation. In total, 139 municipalities had their mayors or reeves acclaimed. Elections were not held in Armour, Armstrong, Brethour, Chamberlain, Chapleau, Charlton and Dack, Dawn-Euphemia, Dorion, Drummond/North Elmsley, East Garafraxa, Enniskillen, Evanturel, Front of Yonge, Gordon/Barrie Island, Hilton, Hilton Beach, Hornepayne, Howick, Kerns, Lake of the Woods, Laurentian Hills, Minto, Oil Springs, Perry, Sioux Narrows-Nestor Falls, South River, Tay, The Archipelago, Thessalon and Thornloe.

== Electoral System ==
In 2016, the Legislative Assembly of Ontario passed Bill 181, the Municipal Elections Modernization Act, which permitted municipalities to adopt ranked ballots for municipal elections (single-winner instant-runoff voting and also multi-winner single transferable voting being allowed).

London was the only municipality to use ranked ballots (in the form of instant-runoff voting) in the 2018 election, with the decision in that city being made by London City Council in 2017, while Cambridge and Kingston held referendums concurrently with their 2018 elections on whether to adopt ranked ballots for the next municipal elections in 2022, with both referendums passing.

However, in 2020 the Legislative Assembly of Ontario passed the Supporting Ontario's Recovery and Municipal Elections Act, 2020, which removed the option for ranked choice voting in municipal elections. Therefore, London switched back to First-past-the-post voting election system for the 2022 election, the cities of Cambridge and Kingston were not able to switch to ranked ballots.

== By municipality ==
=== Counties ===
- 2022 Bruce County municipal elections
- 2022 Dufferin County municipal elections
- 2022 Elgin County municipal elections
- 2022 Essex County municipal elections
- 2022 Frontenac County municipal elections
- 2022 Grey County municipal elections
- 2022 Haliburton County municipal elections
- 2022 Hastings County municipal elections
- 2022 Huron County municipal elections
- 2022 Lambton County municipal elections
- 2022 Lanark County municipal elections
- 2022 Leeds and Grenville United Counties municipal elections
- 2022 Lennox and Addington County municipal elections
- 2022 Middlesex County municipal elections
- 2022 Northumberland County municipal elections
- 2022 Perth County municipal elections
- 2022 Peterborough County municipal elections
- 2022 Prescott and Russell United Counties municipal elections
- 2022 Renfrew County municipal elections
- 2022 Simcoe County municipal elections
- 2022 Stormont, Dundas and Glengarry United Counties municipal elections
- 2022 Wellington County municipal elections

=== Districts ===
- 2022 Algoma District municipal elections
- 2022 Cochrane District municipal elections
- 2022 Kenora District municipal elections
- 2022 Manitoulin District municipal elections
- 2022 Nipissing District municipal elections
- 2022 Parry Sound District municipal elections
- 2022 Rainy River District municipal elections
- 2022 Sudbury District municipal elections
- 2022 Thunder Bay District municipal elections
- 2022 Timiskaming District municipal elections

=== Regional municipalities ===
- 2022 Durham Region municipal elections
- 2022 Halton Region municipal elections
- 2022 Muskoka District municipal elections
- 2022 Niagara Region municipal elections
- 2022 Oxford County municipal elections
- 2022 Peel Region municipal elections (Mississauga)
- 2022 Waterloo Region municipal elections
- 2022 York Region municipal elections

=== Single-tier municipalities ===
Municipalities with more than 125,000 people:

- 2022 Barrie municipal election
- 2022 Greater Sudbury municipal election
- 2022 Guelph municipal election
- 2022 Hamilton, Ontario municipal election
- 2022 Kingston, Ontario municipal election
- 2022 London, Ontario municipal election
- 2022 Ottawa municipal election
- 2022 Toronto municipal election
- 2022 Windsor municipal election

== Single-tier municipalities ==
Municipalities with fewer than 125,000 people:

=== Belleville ===
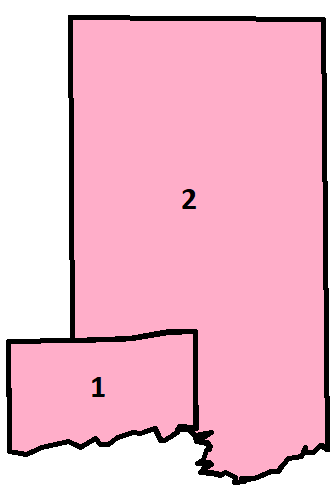
Map of Belleville's wards

The results for mayor of Belleville are as follows:

==== Mayor ====
Mayoral Candidate	Vote	%
Neil Ellis	9,194	59.25
Mitch Panciuk (X)	5,654	36.44
Kyle Thomson	668	4.31

==== Belleville City Council ====
The candidates for Belleville City Council are as follows.

Ward 1 - Belleville 6 to be elected
Candidate	Vote	%
Tyler Allsopp (X)	7,695	13.44
Garnet Thompson (X)	6,767	11.82
Chris Malette (X)	6,528	11.40
Sean Kelly (X)	6,058	10.58
Lisa Anne Chatten	4,331	7.56
Barbara Enright-Miller	4,050	7.07
Margaret Seu	3,821	6.67
Kelly McCaw (X)	3,734	6.52
Carol Ann Feeney (X)	3,602	6.29
Nick Boretski	3,240	5.66
Sarita Van Dyke	2,983	5.21
Mike Benson	1,681	2.94
Jeremy T. Davis	1,615	2.82
Robert Labarge	1,162	2.03

Ward 2 - Thurlow 2 to be elected
Candidate	Vote	%
Paul Carr (X)	2,781	41.66
Kathryn Ann Brown	1,727	25.87
Bill Sandison (X)	1,677	25.12
Michael Clark	490	7.34

=== Brant, County of ===
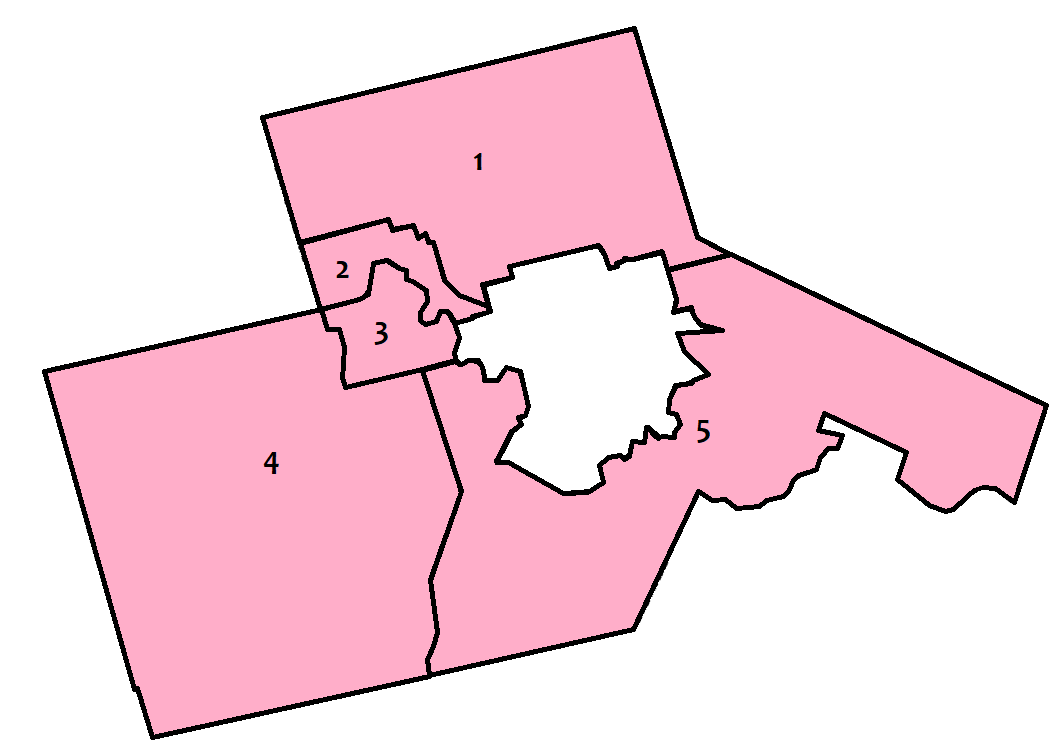
Map of the County of Brant's five wards

==== Mayor ====
The results for mayor of the County of Brant are as follows:

Mayoral Candidate	Vote	%
David Bailey (X)	5,964	72.41
David Swanson	1,471	17.86
Shawn Pratt	802	9.74

==== Brant County Council ====
The results for Brant County Council were as follows. Two to be elected from each ward.

Ward 1
Candidate	Vote	%
John Bradley MacAlpine (X)	1,167	34.01
Jennifer Kyle	1,010	29.44
John Wheat (X)	824	24.02
Jeannine Forbes	430	12.53

Ward 2
Candidate	Vote	%
Steve Howes (X)	1,341	42.65
Lukas Oakley	751	23.89
Jay Arora	627	19.94
Christina Speers	372	11.83
Faizan Baig	53	1.69

Ward 3
Candidate	Vote	%
John Peirce (X)	1,022	36.76
John Bell (X)	920	33.09
Danny Teves	838	30.14

Ward 4
Candidate	Vote	%
Robert Chambers (X)	Acclaimed	
David Miller (X)	Acclaimed	

Ward 5
Candidate	Vote	%
Christine Garneau	1,018	30.22
Brian Coleman (X)	829	24.61
Ella Haley	665	19.74
Mike Gatopoulos	500	14.84%
John Starkey	357	10.60

A by-election was held in Ward 5 on March 16, 2026 to replace Christine Garneau who resigned in October 2025, citing "an irreconcilable conflict" between her business and municipal duties.

Results:

Council Candidate	Vote	%
Ella Haley	568	39.28
Mike Gatopoulos	424	29.32
Joanne Dorr	247	17.08
Greg Anderson	199	13.76
Jeffrey G. Johnston	8	0.55

=== Brantford ===
==== Mayor ====
2022 Brantford Mayoral election
- October 24, 2022
- Turnout: 27.01%
Candidate	Kevin Davis	Dave Wrobel	Ryan Smith
Popular vote	9,220	9,012	1,491
Percentage	45.91%	44.91%	7.43%
Mayor before election
Kevin Davis
Elected mayor
Kevin Davis

Incumbent mayor Kevin Davis was challenged by former city councillor Dave Wrobel.

The results for mayor of Brantford were as follows:

Mayoral Candidate	Vote	%
Kevin Davis (X)	9,220	45.95
Dave Wrobel	9,012	44.91
Ryan Smith	1,491	7.43
John Turmel	343	1.71

==== Brantford City Council ====
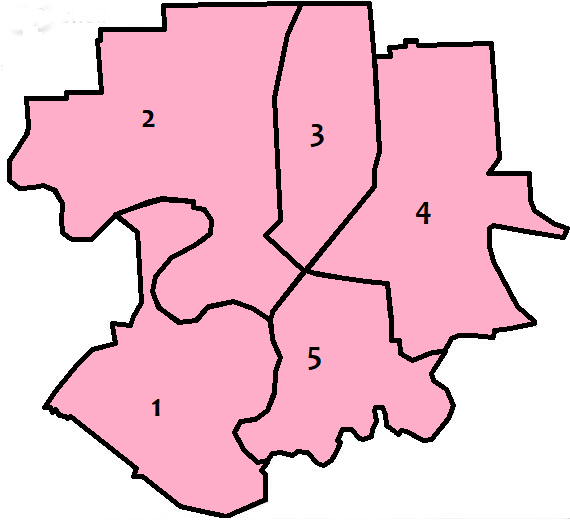
Map of Brantford's five wards

The results for Brantford City Council were as follows. Two elected from each ward.

Ward 1
Candidate	Vote	%
Michael Sullivan	2,020	39.85
Rose Sicoli (X)	1,641	32.37
Mike Tutt	983	19.39
John Van Dyk	425	8.38

Ward 2
Candidate	Vote	%
John Sless (X)	2,571	29.52
Gino Caputo	1,803	20.70
Mark Littell	1,596	18.33
Erica James	1,453	16.68
Peter Sheere	1,012	11.62
Matthew Vaandering	274	3.15

Ward 3
Candidate	Vote	%
Dan McCreary (X)	2,658	28.56
Greg Martin (X)	2,144	23.04
Kim Harrison	1,794	19.28
Mark St. Angelo	1,146	12.31
Kailee Poisson	864	9.28
Frances McCallum	700	7.52

Ward 4
Candidate	Vote	%
Richard Carpenter (X)	3,074	39.93
Linda Hunt	1,530	19.87
Ray Petro	1,254	16.29
Kris Gutierrez	588	7.64
Janet Paul	574	7.46
Richard Wright	314	4.08
Rob Ferguson	211	2.74
Dale Beemer	84	1.09
Mike Gomon	70	0.91

Ward 5
Candidate	Vote	%
Brian Van Tilborg (X)	1,518	32.51
Mandy Samwell	1,307	27.99
Paul MacDougall	579	12.40
Sandra Biggar	415	8.89
Heather Macdonald	372	7.97
John Beaumont	274	5.87
Mike Clancy	112	2.40
Eric Mundy	93	1.99

=== Brockville ===
==== Mayor ====
The candidates for mayor of Brockville are as follows:

Mayoral Candidate	Vote	%
Matt Wren	Acclaimed	

=== Chatham-Kent ===
==== Mayor ====
2022 Chatham-Kent Mayoral election
- October 24, 2022
- Turnout: 30.56%
Candidate	Darrin Canniff	William Pickard	Andy Fisher
Popular vote	17,981	3,588	2,364
Percentage	75.13%	14.99%	9.88%
Mayor before election
Darrin Canniff
Elected mayor
Darrin Canniff

Incumbent mayor Darrin Canniff was challenged by truck driver Andy Fisher and retiree Bill Pickard.

Mayoral Candidate	Vote	%
Darrin Canniff (X)	17,981	75.13
William Pickard	3,588	14.99
Andy Fisher	2,364	9.88

==== Chatham-Kent Municipal Council ====
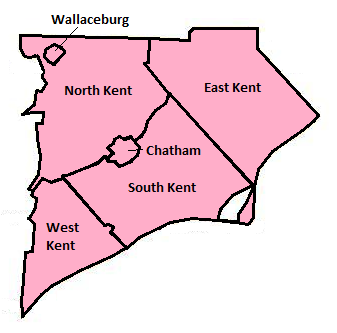
Map of Chatham-Kent's six wards

The results for Chatham-Kent Municipal Council were as follows.

Ward 1 - West Kent 2 to be elected
Candidate	Vote	%
Melissa Harrigan (X)	1,399	36.80
Lauren Anderson	1,331	35.01
Sandy Maynard	718	18.88
David Serednicki	354	9.31

Ward 2 - South Kent 3 to be elected
Candidate	Vote	%
Anthony Ceccacci (X)	3,214	28.10
Trevor Thompson (X)	2,909	25.43
Ryan Doyle	2,083	18.21
Mary Clare Latimer (X)	2,082	18.20
Mike Walker	1,151	10.06

Ward 3 - East Kent 2 to be elected
Candidate	Vote	%
Steve Pinsonneault (X)	2,049	37.47
John Wright (X)	1,727	31.58
Moréna McDonald	1,161	21.23
Matt Lamarche	315	5.76
Martin Fisher	216	3.95

Ward 4 - North Kent 2 to be elected
Candidate	Vote	%
Jamie McGrail (X)	1,506	28.02
Rhonda Jubenville	1,046	19.46
Aaron Neaves	765	14.23
Jim Konecny	631	11.74
Jason Sayer	520	9.67
Scott Kilbride	426	7.93
Dennis Fox	266	4.95
Steve Scott	415	4.00

Ward 5 - Wallaceburg 2 to be elected
Candidate	Vote	%
Aaron Hall (X)	Acclaimed	
Carmen McGregor (X)	Acclaimed	

Ward 6 - Chatham 6 to be elected
Candidate	Vote	%
Brock McGregor (X)	5,329	10.34
Michael Bondy (X)	5,146	9.99
Conor Allin	5,095	9.89
Marjorie Crew (X)	5,056	9.81
Alysson Storey	4,776	9.27
Amy Finn (X)	3,900	7.57
Carson Warrener	3,890	7.55
Derek Robertson	3,844	7.46
Karen Kirkwood-Whyte (X)	3,487	6.77
Larry Vellinga	2,693	5.23
Dava Robichaud	2,087	4.05
Sheila M. Martin	1,937	3.76
Lynn O'Brien	1,621	3.15
Bonny Pigeon	918	1.78
Michael Gibbons	884	1.72
Andrew Elliott	859	1.67

=== Cornwall ===
==== Mayor ====
The results for mayor of Cornwall were as follows:

Mayoral Candidate	Vote	%
Justin Towndale	5,169	51.55
Glen G. Grant (X)	4,088	40.77
James Leroux	556	5.54
Jordan Poapst	215	2.14

==== Cornwall City Council ====
The results for Cornwall City Council were as follows:

At-large 10 to be elected
Candidate	Vote	%
Sarah Good	5,478	8.40
Carilyne Hébert (X)	4,439	6.80
Elaine MacDonald (X)	3,880	5.95
Dean Hollingsworth (X)	3,480	5.33
Todd Bennett (X)	3,312	5.08
Maurice Dupelle (X)	3,302	5.06
Claude McIntosh (X)	3,217	4.93
Denis Sabourin	2,859	4.38
Syd Gardiner (X)	2,738	4.20
Fred Ngoundjo	2,719	4.17
Jason Riley	2,564	3.93
Claude Poirier	2,490	3.82
Denis Carr (X)	2,304	3.53
Mark A. MacDonald	2,242	3.44
Bruce Baker	2,184	3.35
Abid Hussain	2,111	3.24
David Murphy	1,938	2.97
Carol Boileau	1,911	2.93
Patrick Dussault	1,850	2.84
Gerald E. Samson	1,745	2.67
Cory Dixon	1,652	2.53
Mary Jane Proulx	1,610	2.47
Stephen Scott	1,396	2.14
Ryan Martelle	1,175	1.80
Steven Robinson	1,106	1.70
Christopher Leclair	960	1.47
Martin Chevalier	575	0.88

=== Gananoque ===
==== Mayor ====
Incumbent mayor Ted Lojko was challenged by military veteran John Beddows and perioperative nurse Greg Truesdell.

The results for mayor of Gananoque were as follows:

Mayoral Candidate	Vote	%
John Beddows	940	46.03
Ted Lojko (X)	721	35.31
Greg Truesdell	381	18.66

=== Haldimand County ===
The results for mayor of Haldimand County and Haldimand County Municipal Council are as follows:

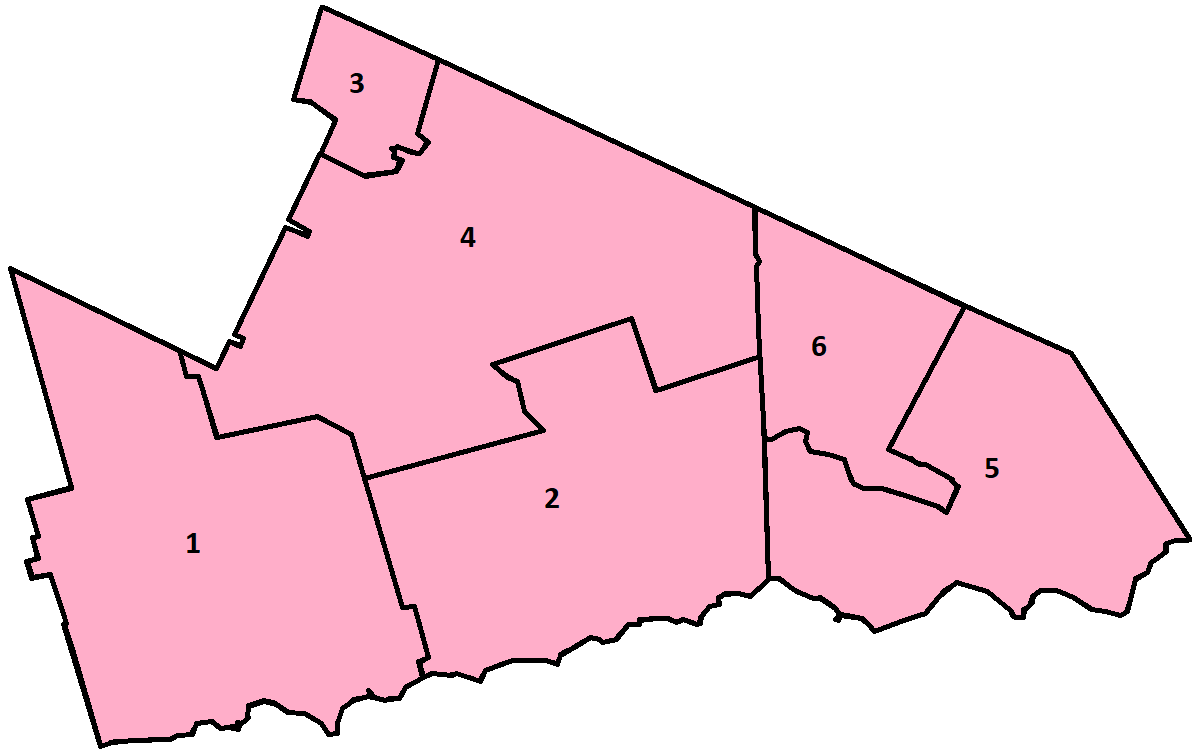
Map of Haldimand County's wards

==== Mayor ====
Incumbent mayor Ken Hewitt ran for re-election. He ran in the 2022 Ontario general election for the Progressive Conservative Party of Ontario in Haldimand—Norfolk, losing to Independent Bobbi Ann Brady.

Mayoral Candidate	Vote	%
Shelley Ann Bentley	4,760	32.09
Jake Vandendool	4,594	30.97
Ken Hewitt (X)	3,700	24.95
Dick Passmore	1,444	9.74
Jennifer Gilmour	334	2.25

==== Haldimand County Municipal Council ====
Ward 1
Candidate	Vote	%
Stewart Patterson (X)	Acclaimed	

Ward 2
Candidate	Vote	%
John Metcalfe (X)	1,502	67.72
Paul Beauvais	716	32.28

Ward 3
Candidate	Vote	%
Dan Lawrence (X)	1,731	49.09
Julie Richardson	1,035	29.35
Mark McEachern	539	15.29
Ray Kitchen	221	6.27

Ward 4
Candidate	Vote	%
Natalie Stam	1,899	65.57
Tony Dalimonte (X)	997	34.43

Ward 5
Candidate	Vote	%
Rob Shirton (X)	925	53.01
Sheldon Simpson	532	30.49
James Kaspersetz	288	16.50

Ward 6
Candidate	Vote	%
Patrick O'Neill	1,003	46.54
Lisa Taylor	909	42.18
Julie Marchese	243	11.28

===== By-elections =====
A by-election was held in Ward 4 on June 19, 2023. The seat was vacated after Natalie Stam resigned for health reasons. The results were as follows:

Council Candidate	Vote	%
Marie Trainer	675	37.05
Tony Dalimonte	641	35.18
Albert Marshall	356	19.54
Jesse Little	101	5.54
James Kaspersetz	49	2.69

Following the death of Trainer on October 31, 2024, another by-election was held in Ward 4 on April 11, 2025. The results were as follows:

Council Candidate	Vote	%
Brad Adams	1,508	58.70
Tony Dalimonte	711	27.68
Albert Marshall	321	12.50
Jesse Little	29	1.13

Following the death of Stewart Patterson on November 26, 2024, a by-election was held in Ward 1, also on April 11, 2025. The results were as follows:

Council Candidate	Vote	%
Debra McKeen	944	44.74
Brian Doyle	926	43.89
Alicia Phillips	240	11.37

=== Kawartha Lakes ===
The results for mayor of Kawartha Lakes and Kawartha Lakes City Council were as follows:

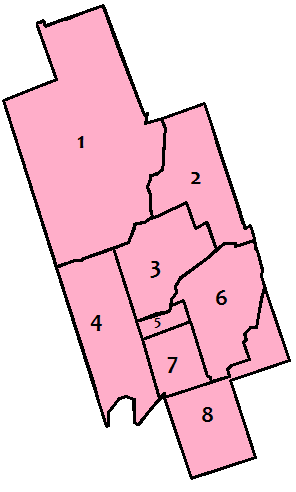
Map of Kawartha Lakes' eight wards

==== Mayor ====
Incumbent mayor Andy Letham did not run for re-election. Running to replace him includes city councillors Pat Dunn, Doug Elmslie and Kathleen Seymour-Fagan.

Mayoral Candidate	Vote	%
Doug Elmslie	7,982	35.72
Pat Dunn	5,295	23.40
Kathleen Seymour-Fagan	3,949	17.45
Faye McGee	2,800	12.37
Jim Riches	1,371	6.06
William Denby	1,232	5.44

==== Kawartha Lakes City Council ====
Ward 1
Candidate	Vote	%
Emmett Yeo (X)	1,004	44.23
Don Logan	597	26.30
Jim Harris	453	19.96
Raymonde Blais Couture	216	9.52

Ward 2
Candidate	Vote	%
Pat Warren	1,823	64.51
Jamie Brown	579	20.49
John Snider	424	15.00

Ward 3
Candidate	Vote	%
Mike Perry	2,207	61.80
Doug Dickerson	1,364	38.20

Ward 4
Candidate	Vote	%
Dan Joyce	548	24.17
David Skrabek	538	23.73
Ian Nicolson	466	20.56
Jamie Campbell	297	13.10
Trevor Johnston	187	8.25
Tyler Richards	182	8.03
Angel Godsoe	49	2.16

Ward 5
Candidate	Vote	%
Eric Smeaton	2,182	57.95
Duncan Gallacher	699	18.57
Janet Di Bello	569	15.11
Wesley Letsholo	190	5.05
Gloria Graham-Weir	125	3.32

Ward 6
Candidate	Vote	%
Ron Ashmore (X)	1,632	59.00
Gerard Jilesen	1,134	41.00

Ward 7
Candidate	Vote	%
Charles McDonald	2,035	64.03
Danielle Willette	696	21.90
Diane Holder	447	14.07

Ward 8
Candidate	Vote	%
Tracy Richardson (X)	1,700	83.33
Greg Ward	340	16.67

===== By-election =====
A by-election was held in Ward 5 on April 10, 2025. The seat was vacated after Eric Smeaton resigned for health and personal reasons. The results were as follows:

Council Candidate	Vote	%
Mark Doble	1,176	40.86
Malcolm Quigley	586	20.36
Pat Dunn	469	16.30
Duncan Gallacher	459	15.95
Alex Steven	173	6.01
Aananth Paraparan	15	0.52

=== Norfolk County ===
The candidates for mayor of Norfolk County and for Norfolk County Council were as follows:

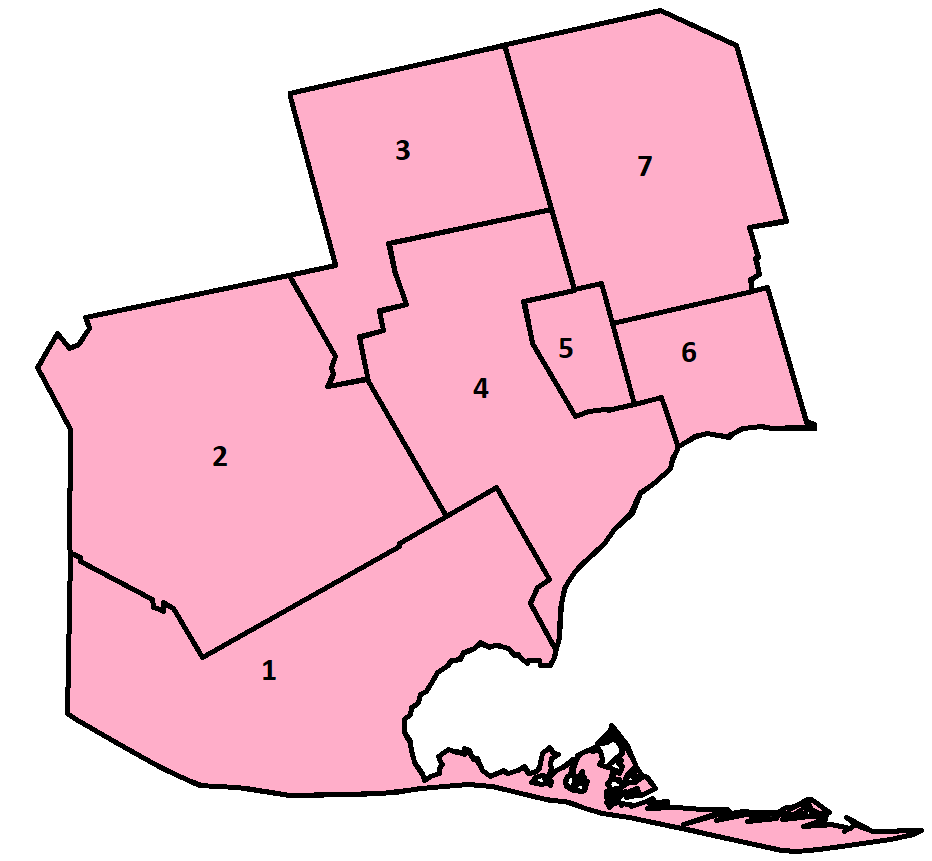
Map of Norfolk County's wards

==== Mayor ====
Incumbent mayor Kristal Chopp ran for re-election. Running against her were county councillors Amy Martin and Ian Rabbitts, former Simcoe town councillor Bill Culver and businessman David Bate.

Mayoral Candidate	Vote	%
Amy Martin	8,199	42.27
Kristal Chopp (X)	5,127	26.43
Bill Culver	3,926	20.24
Ian Rabbitts	1,638	8.44
David Bate	508	2.62

==== Norfolk County Council ====
Ward 1
Candidate	Vote	%
Tom Masschaele (X)	1,310	64.50
Randy Mawhiney	721	35.50

Ward 2
Candidate	Vote	%
Linda Vandendriessche (X)	1,346	80.89
Lucas Tulpin	318	19.11

Ward 3
Candidate	Vote	%
Michael Columbus (X)	1,616	82.24
Jeanette Gomori-Cole	349	17.76

Ward 4
Candidate	Vote	%
Chris Van Paassen (X)	1,108	54.10
William Murray	504	24.61
Jeff Smrcka	300	14.65
Tony Lasanowski	136	6.64

Ward 5 2 to be elected
Candidate	Vote	%
Alan Duthie	2,375	28.48
Doug Brunton	1,906	22.85
Peter Black	1,427	17.11
Kristine Mitchell	1,402	16.81
Brian Jones	703	8.43
Ryan J. Taylor (X)	527	6.32

Ward 6
Candidate	Vote	%
Adam Veri	2,654	64.00
Peter Butler	1,015	24.48
Pamela Taylor	216	5.21
Holly Ann Smith	141	3.40
Adam Wilson	121	2.92

Ward 7
Candidate	Vote	%
Kim Huffman (X)	1,073	45.33
Lorraine Skarratt	742	31.35
Grant MacDonald	447	18.88
Lana Plank	105	4.44

=== Orillia ===
==== Mayor ====
Incumbent mayor Steve Clarke did not run for re-election of Orillia. The candidates for mayor of Orillia are as follows:

Mayoral Candidate	Vote	%
Donald McIsaac	4,861	57.28
Mason Ainsworth	3,345	39.42
John Edward Maxwell	280	3.30

=== Pelee ===
==== Mayor ====
The results for Pelee Island were as follows:

Mayoral Candidate	Vote	%
Cathy Miller	273	85.58
Larry Bailey	46	14.42

=== Pembroke ===
==== Mayor ====
The candidates for mayor of Pembroke are as follows:

Mayoral Candidate	Vote	%
Ron Gervais	Acclaimed	

==== Council ====
Top candidate becomes Deputy Mayor.

Council Candidate	Vote	%
Brian Abdallah (X)	2,238	13.01%
Ian Kuehl	1,935	11.25%
Andrew Plummer (X)	1,855	10.78%
Patricia Lafreniere (X)	1,800	10.46%
Ed Jacyno (X)	1,433	8.33%
Troy Purcell	1,146	6.66%
Stacy Taylor	1,089	6.33%
Dan Callaghan	1,073	6.23%
Dorian Pearce	1,006	5.84%
Jane Wood	882	5.12%
Chela Breckon	808	4.69%
Karen Walsh	658	3.82%
Jason Laronde	480	2.79%
Andrew Clark	457	2.65%
Wade Wallace	338	1.96%

=== Peterborough ===
The results for mayor of Peterborough and Peterborough City Council are as follows:

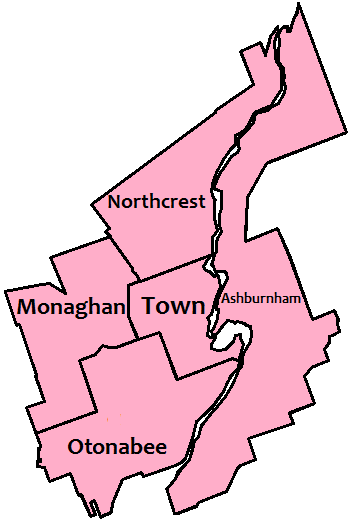
Map of Peterborough's five wards

==== Mayor ====
Incumbent mayor Diane Therrien did not for run for re-election. Candidates running to replace her include former Liberal MPP Jeff Leal and city councillors Henry Clarke and Stephen Wright.

Mayoral Candidate	Vote	%
Jeff Leal	12,911	49.33
Henry Clarke	8,280	31.63
Stephen Wright	3,924	14.99
Brian Lumsden	728	2.78
Victor Kreuz	331	1.26

==== Peterborough City Council ====
The results for Peterborough City Council are as follows. Two councillors are elected from each of the 5 wards.

Ward 1 - Otonabee
Candidate	Vote	%
Lesley Parnell (X)	3,192	40.82
Kevin Duguay	1,943	25.33
Eleanor Underwood	1,169	15.24
Chanté White	1,032	13.45
Nathan Russell-Meharry	396	5.16

Ward 2 - Monaghan
Candidate	Vote	%
Matt Crowley	2,871	28.00
Don Vassiliadis (X)	2,469	24.08
Jeff Westlake	1,968	19.19
Charmaine Magumbe	1,620	15.80
Tom Wigglesworth	806	7.86
Lyle Saunders	520	5.07

Ward 3 - Town
Candidate	Vote	%
Alex Bierk	2,600	30.79
Joy Lachica	2,308	27.33
Dean Pappas (X)	2,143	25.38
Vickie Ann Karikas	966	11.44
Brian Christoph	428	5.07

Ward 4 - Ashburnham
Candidate	Vote	%
Gary Baldwin (X)	3,326	40.07
Keith Riel (X)	2,964	35.71
Andrew MacGregor	2,011	24.23

Ward 5 - Northcrest
Candidate	Vote	%
Andrew Beamer (X)	4,003	38.28
Dave Haacke	2,334	22.32
Carlotta James	1,874	17.92
Shauna Kingston	1,105	10.57
Aldo Andreoli	722	6.90
Karen Grant	420	4.02

=== Prescott ===
Town councillor Gauri Shankar has been acclaimed as mayor of Prescott.

Mayoral Candidate	Vote	%
Gauri Shankar	Acclaimed	

=== Prince Edward County ===
==== Mayor ====
The results for mayor of Prince Edward County are as follows:

Mayoral Candidate	Vote	%
Steve Ferguson (X)	4,634	41.53
Terry Shortt	3,199	28.67
Dianne O'Brien	3,122	27.98
Kyle Mayne	202	1.81

=== Quinte West ===
==== Mayor ====
The results for mayor of Quinte West and Quinte West City Council were as follows:

Mayoral Candidate	Vote	%
Jim Harrison (X)	5,655	54.26
Karen Sharpe	4,664	44.75
Claudor du-Lude	104	1.00

==== Quinte West City Council ====
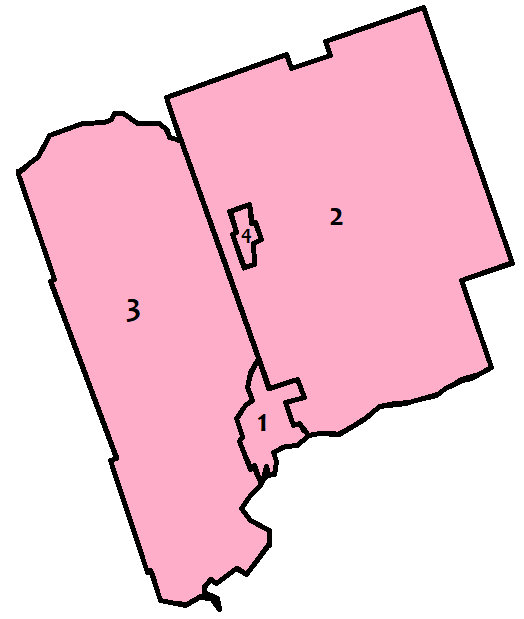
Map of Quinte West's four wards

Ward 1 - Trenton 5 to be elected
Candidate	Vote	%
Zack Card	2,260	16.69
Michael Kotsovos (X)	2,076	15.33
Dave Hugh O'Neil (X)	2,029	14.99
Sally Freeman (X)	1,900	14.03
Duncan Armstrong	1,859	13.73
Leslie Roseblade (X)	1,792	13.24
Jason Young	861	6.36
David Lovely	761	5.62

Ward 2 - Sidney 4 to be elected
Candidate	Vote	%
Egerton Boyce	2,072	19.22
Shelley Stedall	1,775	16.47
Terry R. F. Cassidy (X)	1,766	16.39
Don Kuntze (X)	1,703	15.80
Allan DeWitt (X)	1,665	15.45
Hillary Robert	1,441	13.37
Stephen P. Kornblum	356	3.30

Ward 3 - Murray 2 to be elected
Candidate	Vote	%
Jim Alyea (X)	1,529	28.60
David McCue (X)	1,319	24.67
Lori Whaley	924	17.28
Doug Herrington	720	13.47
Tyler Rickey	589	11.02
Jodan Hoyland	266	4.97

Ward 4 - Frankford
Candidate	Vote	%
Lynda Reid (X)	337	48.14
Matt Joice	275	39.29
Gregg Covell	88	12.57

=== Smiths Falls ===
==== Mayor ====
Incumbent mayor of Smiths Falls Shawn Pankow was challenged by the "self-proclaimed resident protestor" Justin Duhamel.

Mayoral Candidate	Vote	%
Shawn Pankow (X)	1,635	63.40
Justin Duhamel	944	36.60

=== St. Marys ===
Incumbent mayor Al Strathdee was re-elected by acclamation for a third term.

Mayoral Candidate	Vote	%
Al Strathdee (X)	Acclaimed	

=== Stratford ===
==== Mayor ====
Incumbent mayor Dan Mathieson did not run for re-election. The results for mayor of Stratford were as follows:

Mayoral Candidate	Vote	%
Martin Ritsma	4,350	37.76
Robert Ritz	4,005	34.76
Kathy Vassilakos	3,166	27.48

=== St. Thomas ===
==== Mayor ====
The results for mayor of St. Thomas and St. Thomas City Council were as follows:

Mayoral Candidate	Vote	%
Joe Preston (X)	5,526	59.14
Heather Jackson	2,912	31.16
Gregg McCart	906	9.70

==== St. Thomas City Council ====
At-large 8 to be elected
Candidate	Vote	%
Steve Peters (X)	7,385	13.58
Steve Wookey (X)	5,564	10.23
Jeff Kohler (X)	5,253	9.66
Lori Baldwin-Sands (X)	5,057	9.30
Gary Clarke (X)	4,811	8.84
Jim Herbert (X)	3,521	6.47
Rose Gibson	3,266	6.00
Tara McCaulley	3,101	5.70
Earl Taylor	3,096	5.69
Petrusia Hontar	2,251	4.14
Joe Docherty Jr.	2,140	3.93
Dawn Docker	2,031	3.73
Devon Church	1,896	3.49
Shawn De Neire	1,803	3.31
Harald Schraeder	1,739	3.20
Timothy Hedden	1,479	2.72
