= 2026 Wellington County municipal elections =

2026 elections in Ontario

Elections will be held in Wellington County, Ontario on October 26, 2026 in conjunction with municipal elections across the province.

== Wellington County Council ==
Wellington County Council consists of the seven mayors of the constituent municipalities plus nine councillors elected from county wards.

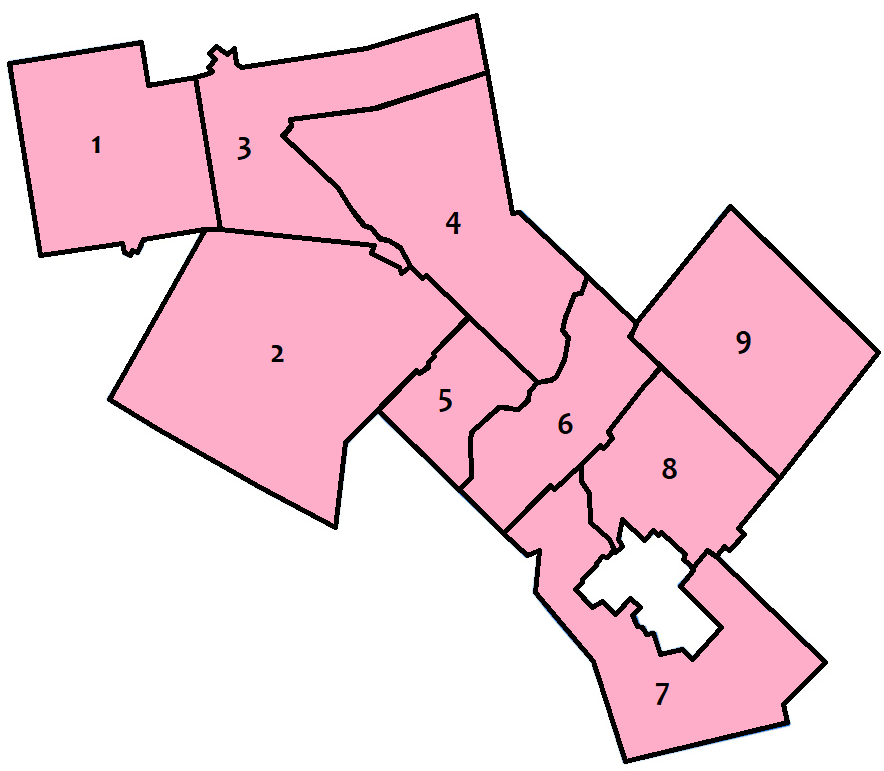
Map of Wellington County's nine wards

Position	Elected
Centre Wellington Mayor	Bronwynne Wilton
Erin Mayor	Dusty Scott
Guelph/Eramosa Mayor	Chris White
Mapleton Mayor	
Minto Mayor	Dave Turton (acclaimed)
Puslinch Mayor	James Seeley
Wellington North Mayor	
Ward 1	David Anderson (acclaimed)
Ward 2	Earl Campbell (acclaimed)
Ward 3	
Ward 4	
Ward 5	Mary Lloyd (acclaimed)
Ward 6	Diane Ballantyne (acclaimed)
Ward 7	Matthew Bulmer (acclaimed)
Ward 8	Doug Breen (acclaimed)
Ward 9	Jeff Duncan (acclaimed)

=== Council races by ward ===
Candidate	Vote	%
Ward 1
David Anderson (X)	Acclaimed	
Ward 2
Earl Campbell (X)	Acclaimed	
Ward 3
Campbell Cork (X)		
Dan Yake		
Ward 4
Stephen O'Neill (X)		
Allan Tota		
Ward 5
Mary Lloyd (X)	Acclaimed	
Ward 6
Diane Ballantyne (X)	Acclaimed	
Ward 7
Matthew Bulmer (X)	Acclaimed	
Ward 8
Doug Breen (X)	Acclaimed	
Ward 9
Jeff Duncan (X)	Acclaimed	

== Centre Wellington ==
=== Mayor ===
Mayor Shawn Watters is running for re-election. He is being opposed by former councillors Neil Dunsmore and Stephen Kitras (who is also a past New Blue Party of Ontario candidate), former mayor Kelly Linton and councillor and past Green Party of Ontario candidate Bronwynne Wilton.

List of candidates:

Mayoral Candidate	Vote	%
Bronwynne Wilton	4,731	38%
Neil Dunsmore	2,736	22%
Kelly Linton	2,252	18%
Shawn Watters (X)	1,912	15%
Stephen Kitras	953	8%

== Erin ==
=== Mayor ===
Running against mayor Michael Dehn are former councillor Rob Smith and co-president of the Erin Outlaws hockey team, Dusty Scott.

List of candidates:

Mayoral Candidate	Vote	%
Dusty Scott	2,151	45%
Rob Smith	1,893	40%
Michael Dehn (X)	729	15%

== Guelph/Eramosa ==
=== Mayor ===
Mayor Chris White is being challenged by Dan Kennaley, a retired director of engineering and planning services for Woolwich Township.

List of candidates:

Mayoral Candidate	Vote	%
Chris White (X)	2,801	65%
Dan Kennaley	1,526	35%

== Mapleton ==
=== Mayor ===
Mayor Gregg Davidson is being challenged by councillor Amanda Reid.

List of candidates:

Mayoral Candidate	Vote	%
Gregg Davidson (X)		
Amanda Reid		

== Minto ==
=== Mayor ===
List of candidates:

Mayoral Candidate	Vote	%
Dave Turton (X)	Acclaimed	

== Puslinch ==
=== Mayor ===
Mayor James Seeley is being challenged by retired businessman Mike Wilford and MME Bin Rental owner Stephanie McCrone.

List of candidates:

Mayoral Candidate	Vote	%
James Seeley (X)	1,527	52%
Stephanie McCrone	920	32%
Michael Wilford	472	16%

== Wellington North ==
=== Mayor ===
List of candidates:

Mayoral Candidate	Vote	%
Kelly Dimick		
Steven McCabe		

== See also ==
- 2022 Wellington County municipal elections
- 2018 Wellington County municipal elections
- 2014 Wellington County municipal elections
- 2010 Wellington County municipal elections
