= 2022 Wellington County municipal elections =

Local election in Ontario, Canada

Elections were held in Wellington County, Ontario on October 24, 2022 in conjunction with municipal elections across the province.

== Wellington County Council ==
Wellington County Council consists of the seven mayors of the constituent municipalities plus nine councillors elected from county wards.

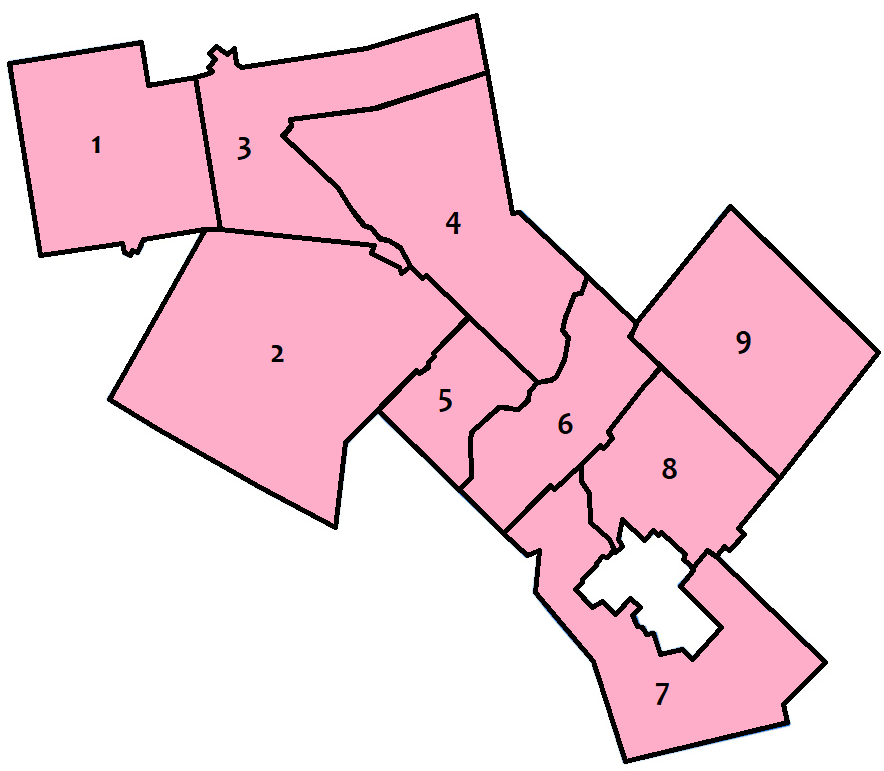
Map of Wellington County's nine wards

Position	Elected
Centre Wellington Mayor	Shawn Watters
Erin Mayor	Michael Dehn
Guelph/Eramosa Mayor	Chris White (acclaimed)
Mapleton Mayor	Gregg Davidson (acclaimed)
Minto Mayor	Dave Turton (acclaimed)
Puslinch Mayor	James Seeley (acclaimed)
Wellington North Mayor	Andy Lennox
Ward 1	David Anderson
Ward 2	Earl Campbell
Ward 3	Campbell Cork (acclaimed)
Ward 4	Stephen O'Neill (acclaimed)
Ward 5	Mary Lloyd
Ward 6	Diane Ballantyne
Ward 7	Matthew Bulmer (acclaimed)
Ward 8	Doug Breen
Ward 9	Jeff Duncan (acclaimed)

=== Council races by ward ===
Candidate	Vote	%
Ward 1 (Minto)
David Anderson (X)	1,588	89.92
Bert Beilke	178	10.08
Ward 2 (Mapleton)
Earl Campbell (X)	817	73.74
Frank Carere	291	26.26
Ward 3 (Wellington North, part and Centre Wellington, part)
Campbell Cork (X)	Acclaimed	
Ward 4 (Wellington North, part)
Stephen O'Neill (X)	Acclaimed	
Ward 5 (Centre Wellington, part)
Mary Lloyd (X)	3,089	75.05
Randy Vaine	1,027	24.95
Ward 6 (Centre Wellington, part)
Diane Ballantyne (X)	1,917	57.60
Melanie Lang	1,411	42.40
Ward 7 (Puslinch, and Guelph/Eramosa, part)
Matthew Bulmer	Acclaimed	
Ward 8 (Guelph/Eramosa, part)
Doug Breen (X)	1,545	69.07
Melanie Flake	692	30.93
Ward 9 (Erin)
Jeff Duncan (X)	Acclaimed	

== Centre Wellington ==
Incumbent mayor and county warden Kelly Linton did not run for re-election. The following were the results for mayor of Centre Wellington.

Mayoral Candidate	Vote	%
Shawn Watters	4,105	45.35
Neil Dunsmore	3,417	37.75
Bob Foster	1,529	16.89

== Erin ==
Town councillor Rob Smith ran against geologist Michael Dehn.

Mayoral Candidate	Vote	%
Michael Dehn	1,776	53.40
Rob Smith	1,550	46.60

== Guelph/Eramosa ==
Incumbent mayor Chris White was re-elected by acclamation.

Mayoral Candidate	Vote	%
Chris White (X)	Acclaimed	

== Mapleton ==
Incumbent mayor Gregg Davidson was re-elected by acclamation.

Mayoral Candidate	Vote	%
Gregg Davidson (X)	Acclaimed	

== Minto ==
Deputy mayor Dave Turton was elected by acclamation.

Mayoral Candidate	Vote	%
Dave Turton	Acclaimed	

== Puslinch ==
Incumbent mayor James Seeley was re-elected by acclamation.

Mayoral Candidate	Vote	%
James Seeley (X)	Acclaimed	

== Wellington North ==
Incumbent mayor Andy Lennox was challenged by township councillor Dan Yake.

Mayoral Candidate	Vote	%
Andy Lennox (X)	1,646	52.74
Dan Yake	1,475	47.26

== See also ==
- 2018 Wellington County municipal elections
- 2014 Wellington County municipal elections
- 2010 Wellington County municipal elections
