= Graeme Murray =

Canadian ice sledge hockey player

- Born: 14 December 1984 (age 41) Bracebridge, Ontario, Canada
- Height: 5 ft 5 in (165 cm)
- Weight: 190 lb (86 kg; 13 st 8 lb)
- Position: Defence
- Shot: Right
- National team: Canada
- Playing career: 2001–2015
- Website: www.graememurray.ca
Medal record
Para ice hockey
Representing Canada
Paralympic Games
Gold medal – first place	2006 Torino	Team
Bronze medal – third place	2014 Sochi	Team
World Championships
Gold medal – first place	2008 Marlborough	Team
Gold medal – first place	2013 Goyang	Team
Bronze medal – third place	2009 Ostrava	Team
Bronze medal – third place	2012 Hamar	Team

Graeme Murray (born 14 December 1984, in Bracebridge) is a Canadian ice sledge hockey player. He contracted a virus when he was three, which spread to his spinal cord, causing paralysis.

He made his debut for Canada's national team aged 15, and in 2002 was the team's youngest member at the 2002 Salt Lake City Winter Paralympic Games.

In 2014 Murray retired from competition to move back to his hometown of Gravenhurst, Ontario. He was elected to the town council in the October 2018 municipal election.

== Honours ==
- 2014 Winter Paralympics
  - Bronze in ice sledge hockey
- 2013 IPC Ice Sledge Hockey World Championships
  - Gold
- 2012 IPC Ice Sledge Hockey World Championships
  - Bronze
- 2010 Winter Paralympics
  - 4th place in ice sledge hockey
- 2009 IPC Ice Sledge Hockey World Championships
  - Bronze
- 2008 IPC Ice Sledge Hockey World Championships
  - Gold
- 2006 Winter Paralympics
  - Gold in ice sledge hockey
- 2004 IPC Ice Sledge Hockey World Championships
  - 4th place
- 2002 Winter Paralympics
  - 4th place
- The Centennial Centre in Gravenhurst, ON was renamed The Graeme Murray Arena in honour of Murray in 2014.
