= 2018 Haliburton County municipal elections =

Local election in Ontario, Canada

Elections were held in Haliburton County, Ontario on October 22, 2018 in conjunction with municipal elections across the province.

== Haliburton County Council ==
The Haliburton County Council consists of the reeves and deputy reeves of the four constituent municipalities. A warden is elected from the eight members.

Position	Elected
Algonquin Highlands Mayor	Carol Moffatt (acclaimed)
Algonquin Highlands Deputy Mayor	(chosen from council)
Dysart et al Reeve	Andrea Roberts
Dysart et al Deputy Reeve	Patrick Kennedy
Highlands East Mayor	Dave Burton
Highlands East Deputy Mayor	(chosen from council)
Minden Hills Reeve	Brent Devolin
Minden Hills Deputy Reeve	Lisa Schell (acclaimed)

== Algonquin Highlands ==
Mayoral Candidate	Vote	%
Carol Moffatt (X)	Acclaimed	

== Dysart et al ==
Reeve Candidate	Vote	%
Andrea Roberts	3,445	57.82
Murray Fearrey (X)	2,513	42.18

== Highlands East ==
Mayor Candidate	Vote	%
Dave Burton (X)	1,557	56.25
Cheryl Ellis	1,211	43.75

== Minden Hills ==
Reeve Candidate	Vote	%
Brent Devolin (X)	1,720	45.78
Wayne Hancock	1,375	36.60
Jarrett Campbell	662	17.62
