= 2018 Parry Sound District municipal elections =

Elections were held in the organized municipalities in the Parry Sound District of Ontario on October 22, 2018 in conjunction with municipal elections across the province.

== The Archipelago ==
Reeve Candidate	Vote	%
Bert Liverance	Acclaimed	

== Armour ==
Reeve Candidate	Vote	%
Bob Macphail (X)	Acclaimed	

== Burk's Falls ==
Reeve Candidate	Vote	%
Cathy Still (X)	Acclaimed	

== Callander ==
Mayoral Candidate	Vote	%
Hec Lavigne (X)	Acclaimed	

== Carling ==
Mayoral Candidate	Vote	%
Mike Konoval (X)	Acclaimed	

== Joly ==
Mayoral Candidate	Vote	%
Tim Bryson	125	38.58
Chris Nicholson	120	37.04
Bruce Baker (X)	79	24.38

== Kearney ==
Mayoral Candidate	Vote	%
Carol Ballantyne	729	69.83
Yvonne Wills	315	30.17

== Machar ==
Mayoral Candidate	Vote	%
Lynda Carleton (X)	Acclaimed	

== Magnetawan ==
Mayoral Candidate	Vote	%
Sam Dunnett (X)	812	70.00
Michael Gebhardt	348	30.00

== McDougall ==
Mayoral Candidate	Vote	%
Dale Robinson (X)	Acclaimed	

== McKellar ==
Reeve Candidate	Vote	%
Peter Hopkins (X)	972	67.88
Bonnie Beier	460	32.12

== McMurrich/Monteith ==
Reeve Candidate	Vote	%
Ron Walton	395	70.79
David Stewart	163	29.21

== Nipissing ==
Mayoral Candidate	Vote	%
Thomas C. Piper (X)	Acclaimed	

== Parry Sound ==
Mayoral Candidate	Vote	%
Jamie McGarvey (X)	1,788	73.70
Dave Williams	413	17.02
Chris O'Gram	225	9.27

== Perry ==
Mayoral Candidate	Vote	%
Norm Hofstetter (X)	Acclaimed	

== Powassan ==
Mayoral Candidate	Vote	%
Peter McIsaac (X)	Acclaimed	

== Ryerson ==
Reeve Candidate	Vote	%
George Sterling	249	54.01
Glenn Miller (X)	212	45.99

== Seguin ==
Mayoral Candidate	Vote	%
Ann MacDiarmid	2,135	50.12
Mario Buszynski	1,474	34.60
Mark Stivrins	651	15.28

== South River ==
Mayoral Candidate	Vote	%
Jim Coleman (X)	Acclaimed	

== Strong ==
Mayoral Candidate	Vote	%
Kelly Elik	472	85.35
Rick Armitage	81	14.65

== Sundridge ==
Mayoral Candidate	Vote	%
Lyle Hall (X)	223	59.79
Lawrie Vincer	150	40.21

== Whitestone ==
Mayoral Candidate	Vote	%
Chris Armstrong (X)	Acclaimed	
