= 2018 Middlesex County municipal elections =

Local election in Ontario, Canada

Elections were held in Middlesex County, Ontario on October 22, 2018 in conjunction with municipal elections across the province.

== Middlesex County Council ==
County Council consists of the mayors of each municipality plus the deputy mayors of the municipalities over 5,000 people.

Position	Elected
Adelaide Metcalfe Mayor	Kurtis Smith
Lucan Biddulph Mayor	Cathy Burghardt-Jesson (acclaimed)
Middlesex Centre Mayor	Aina DeViet
Middlesex Centre Deputy Mayor	John Brennan
Newbury Reeve	Dianne Brewer (acclaimed)
North Middlesex Mayor	Brian Ropp
North Middlesex Deputy Mayor	Adrian Cornelissen
Southwest Middlesex Mayor	Allan Mayhew
Southwest Middlesex Deputy Mayor	Marigay Wilkins
Strathroy Caradoc Mayor	Joanne Vanderheyden
Strathroy Caradoc Deputy Mayor	Brad Richards
Thames Centre Mayor	Alison Warwick
Thames Centre Deputy Mayor	Kelly Elliott

== Adelaide Metcalfe ==
Mayoral Candidate	Vote	%
Kurtis Smith (X)	742	65.90
David Bolton	384	34.10

== Lucan Biddulph ==
Mayoral Candidate	Vote	%
Cathy Burghardt-Jesson (X)	Acclaimed	

== Middlesex Centre ==
Mayoral Candidate	Vote	%
Aina DeViet	2,808	54.83
Brian Urbshott	2,313	45.17

== Newbury ==
Mayoral Candidate	Vote	%
Dianne Brewer (X)	Acclaimed	

== North Middlesex ==
Mayoral Candidate	Vote	%
Brian Ropp	1,747	78.87
Brad Harness	468	21.13

== Southwest Middlesex ==
Mayoral Candidate	Vote	%
Allan Mayhew	1,478	67.06
Vance Blackmore (X)	611	27.72
John Kendall	115	5.22

== Strathroy-Caradoc ==
Mayoral Candidate	Vote	%
Joanne Vanderheyden (X)	4,587	75.94
Brian Derbyshire	1,131	18.73
Brad Bock	322	5.33

== Thames Centre ==
Mayoral Candidate	Vote	%
Alison Warwick	2,853	61.28
Marcel Meyer (X)	1,803	38.72
