= 2018 Leeds and Grenville United Counties municipal elections =

Elections were held in Leeds and Grenville United Counties, Ontario on October 22, 2018 in conjunction with municipal elections across the province.

== Leeds and Grenville United Counties Council ==
The Council consists of the mayors and reeves of the constituent municipalities.

Position	Elected
Athens Mayor	Herb Scott (acclaimed)
Augusta Reeve	Doug Malanka
Edwardsburgh/Cardinal Mayor	Patrick Sayeau
Elizabethtown-Kitley Mayor	Brant Burrow
Front of Yonge Mayor	Roger Haley (acclaimed)
Leeds and the Thousand Islands Mayor	Corinna Smith-Gatcke
Merrickville-Wolford Mayor	Doug Struthers
North Grenville Mayor	Nancy Peckford
Rideau Lakes Mayor	Arie Hoogenboom
Westport Mayor	Robin Jones (acclaimed)

== Athens ==
Mayoral Candidate	Vote	%
Herb Scott (X)	Acclaimed	

== Augusta ==
Reeve Candidate	Vote	%
Doug Malanka (X)	1,491	59.10
Darlene Banning	1,032	40.90

== Edwardsburgh/Cardinal ==
Mayoral Candidate	Vote	%
Patrick Sayeau (X)	1,397	52.40
David Dobbie	882	33.08
Philip Parent	387	14.52

== Elizabethtown-Kitley ==
Mayoral Candidate	Vote	%
Brant Burrow	1,141	35.59
Dan Downey	1,135	35.40
Jim Miller	930	29.01

== Front of Yonge ==
Mayoral Candidate	Vote	%
Roger Haley (X)	Acclaimed	

== Leeds and the Thousand Islands ==
Mayoral Candidate	Vote	%
Corinna Smith-Gatcke	2,151	47.89
Joe Baptista (X)	1,276	28.41
John Paul Jackson	1,011	22.51
Kurt Liebe	54	1.20

== Merrickville-Wolford ==
Mayoral Candidate	Vote	%
Doug Struthers	609	41.29
David Nash (X)	390	26.44
Anne Barr	325	22.03
Chuck MacInnis	151	10.24

== North Grenville ==
Mayoral Candidate	Vote	%
Nancy Peckford	2,844	47.96
Jim Bertram	1,632	27.52
David Gordon (X)	1,200	20.24
Elwood Armour	254	4.28

== Rideau Lakes ==
Mayoral Candidate	Vote	%
Arie Hoogenboom	3,184	62.85
Robert Dunfield	1,882	37.15

== Westport ==
Mayoral Candidate	Vote	%
Robin Jones (X)	Acclaimed	
