= Scott Aitchison =

Canadian politician (born 1973)

Scott Aitchison MP
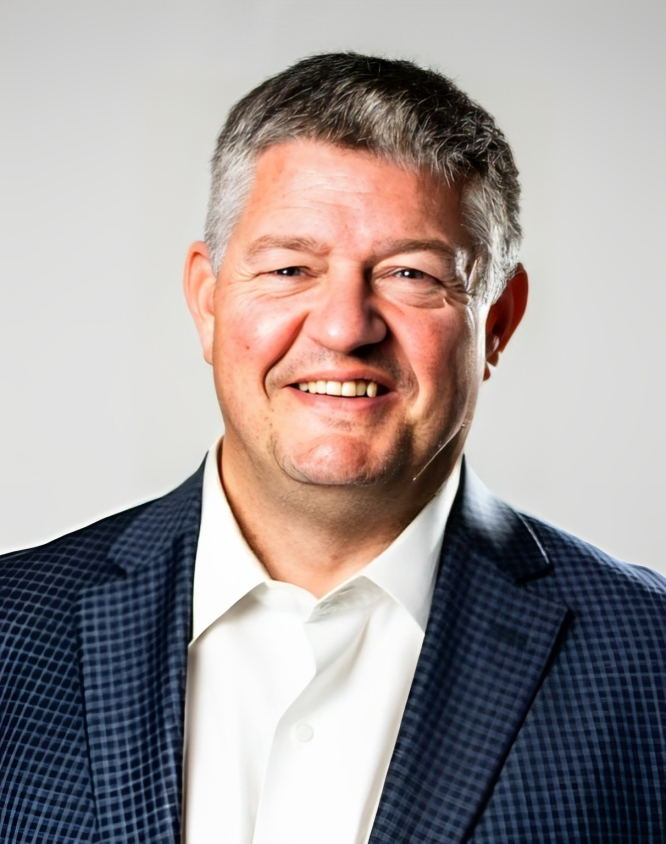
- Aitchison in 2022

Regional Chair of the District Municipality of Muskoka
- Assuming office December 1, 2026
- Appointed by: Rob Flack
- Succeeding: Jeff Lehman

Member of Parliament for Parry Sound-Muskoka
- Incumbent
- Assumed office October 21, 2019
- Preceded by: Tony Clement

Mayor of Huntsville
- In office December 1, 2014 – October 28, 2019
- Preceded by: Claude Doughty
- Succeeded by: Karin Terziano

Personal details
- Born: January 14, 1973 (age 53) Huntsville, Ontario, Canada
- Party: Conservative
- Education: York University
- Profession: Realtor, Mayor, Politician
- Website: www.votescott.ca

Scott Aitchison (/ˈeɪtʃɪsən/ AY-chiss-ən, born January 14, 1973) is a Canadian politician who has served as the member of Parliament for Parry Sound—Muskoka since 2019. A member of the Conservative Party, he previously served as the mayor of Huntsville, Ontario from 2014 to 2019.

On November 10, 2026, he was appointed chair of the District Municipality of Muskoka. He will be sworn in on December 1, 2026.

Aitchison was a candidate in the 2022 Conservative Party of Canada leadership election, finishing fifth.

== Early career ==
In his early years, Aitchison worked in sales with Coldwell Banker Thompson Real Estate, and Fowler Construction. He was previously a consultant with Enterprise Canada Group from 1998 to 2004.

He was a co-chair of the organizing committee for the 2012 Ontario Para Winter Games in Huntsville.

== Municipal politics ==
Aitchison was first elected to the Huntsville Town Council in 1994 at the age of 21, where he served for three terms. At the time, he was the youngest individual ever elected to Huntsville Town Council and Muskoka District Council. He was elected again as a District and Town Councilor in 2010 and was Deputy Mayor for the next four years. He was elected mayor in 2014 and re-elected in 2018. He served the office until October 28, 2019.

On November 10, 2026, Ontario Minister of Municipal Affairs and Housing Rob Flack appointed Aitchison to succeed Jeff Lehman as chair of the District Municipality of Muskoka for the 2026–2030 council term. The appointment was made under the Better Regional Governance Act, 2026, which replaced selection of the chair by district councillors with appointment by the minister. He will be sworn in December 1, 2026.

== Federal politics ==
Aitchison won the Conservative nomination in 2019, defeating three other candidates, and subsequently won the general election in October of the same year. After winning re-election in 2021, Aitchison was appointed to the Official Opposition Shadow Cabinet as the Shadow Minister for Labour.

In December 2021, Aitchison worked with Liberal Minister Seamus O'Regan to include in Government Bill C-3 an extension of bereavement leave for grieving parents who work in federally regulated industries. This change incorporated a previously tabled private member’s bill from Conservative MP Tom Kmiec into the government’s legislation. O'Regan described the cross-party cooperation as rare.

On March 3, 2022, it was reported that Aitchison was preparing a bid for leadership of the Conservative Party. Aitchison officially launched his campaign on March 20 at a rally in Huntsville. He placed last, earning just one per cent of the vote, losing to Pierre Poilievre.

Aitchison is currently serving as party's critic for housing, diversity, and inclusion.

On September 30, 2026, Aitchison announced he would resign his seat in Parliament by the end of the year.

== Political positions ==
During the 2022 leadership race, Aitchison was characterized as a centrist. However, he prefers to see himself as a "small-c conservative".

=== Political polarization ===
During the Canada convoy protest, Aitchison criticized Prime Minister Justin Trudeau for not engaging with Canadians who disagreed with him. In the House of Commons, he called for compromise and greater tolerance of political disagreement.

=== Housing ===
Aitchison started his leadership campaign by releasing a plan to address housing affordability. His plan, "YIMBY: A Plan to Build More Homes for Canadians", had four main aims: ending exclusionary zoning, increasing the number of tradespeople through education and immigration, increasing affordable and social housing, and cracking down on money laundering in Canadian real-estate.

=== Bill 21 ===
Aitchison opposed Quebec's Bill 21, arguing that its restrictions on religious symbols infringed freedom of religion

=== CANZUK ===
Aitchison is supportive of CANZUK, a proposed alliance of Canada, Australia, New Zealand, and the United Kingdom to increase trade, foreign policy, and military co-operation. He was named to lead two cross-party working groups aimed to facilitate discussions on freer movement and trade within the partner countries.

=== Rural broadband ===
In his first intervention in the House of Commons, Aitchison raised concern about rural internet service in his riding. He believes there needs to be more competition in the market and federal investment in underserviced areas.

=== Environment ===
Aitchison has supported reducing greenhouse gas emissions through technological innovation by industry. He has opposed a carbon tax, arguing that it places a disproportionate burden on lower-income Canadians in rural areas.

=== LGBTQ+ ===
On May 17, 2023, Aitchison joined fellow Conservative MP Michelle Rempel Garner and members of the federal Liberal Party, Green Party, and NDP in releasing a statement on the International Day Against Homophobia, Biphobia and Transphobia. Aitchison told The Hill Times in February 2024 that he supports trans people's right to live without government restrictions, but did not comment on Pierre Poilievre's remarks or Alberta Premier Danielle Smith's policies on trans people.

== Personal life ==
At the time of the 2025 Canadian federal election, he lived in Baysville, Ontario.

== Electoral record ==
=== Federal ===
2025 Canadian federal election: Parry Sound—Muskoka
Party	Candidate	Votes	%	±%	Expenditures
Conservative	Scott Aitchison	33,742	52.2	+4.27	
Liberal	Geordie Sabbagh	27,563	42.6	+21.1	
New Democratic	Heather Hay	2,300	3.6	–13.3	
People's	Isabel Pereira	1,048	1.6	–5.9	
Total valid votes/expense limit		64,653			
Total rejected ballots		353			
Turnout		65,006	71.43		
Eligible voters		91,006			
Source: Elections Canada

2022 Conservative Party of Canada leadership results by ballot First round (points allocated): Poilievre / 68.15%; Charest / 16.07%; Lewis / 9.69%; Baber / 5.03%; Aitchison / 1.06%; First round (votes cast): Poilievre / 70.7%; Charest / 11.6%; Lewis / 11.1%; Baber / 5.4%; Aitchison / 1.2%

2021 Canadian federal election: Parry Sound—Muskoka
Party	Candidate	Votes	%	±%	Expenditures
Conservative	Scott Aitchison	26,600	47.9	+6.1	$51,208.95
Liberal	Jovanie Nicoyishakiye	12,014	21.6	-8.8	$16,882.76
New Democratic	Heather Hay	9,339	16.8	+5.1	$7,768.65
People's	James Tole	4,184	7.5	N/A	$4,502.18
Green	Marc Mantha	3,099	5.6	-9.8	$17,519.77
Independent	Daniel Predie Jr	169	0.3	-0.4	$0.00
National Citizens Alliance	James Fawcett	95	0.2	–	$29.70
Total valid votes		55,500			
Total rejected ballots		299			
Turnout		55,799	65.01		
Eligible voters		85,831			
Source: Elections Canada

2019 Canadian federal election: Parry Sound—Muskoka
Party	Candidate	Votes	%	±%	Expenditures
Conservative	Scott Aitchison	22,845	41.8	-1.50	$77,914.80
Liberal	Trisha Cowie	16,615	30.4	-8.48	$71,267.46
Green	Gord Miller	8,409	15.4	+8.18	$55,284.74
New Democratic	Tom Young	6,417	11.7	+1.59	none listed
Independent	Daniel Predie Jr	377	0.7	–	none listed
Total valid votes/expense limit		54,663	100.0		
Total rejected ballots		392			
Turnout		55,055	66.4		
Eligible voters		82,930			
Conservative hold		Swing		+3.49	
Source: Elections Canada

=== Municipal ===
2014 Huntsville mayoral election
Candidate	Vote	%
Scott Aitchison	3,708	45.39
Hugh Mackenzie	2,264	27.71
Tim Withey	2,198	26.90

2018 Huntsville mayoral election
Candidate	Vote	%
Scott Aitchison	5,318	81.83
Peggy Peterson	1,181	18.17
