= 2018 Elgin County municipal elections =

Elgin County Municipal Election

Elections were held in Elgin County, Ontario on October 22, 2018 in conjunction with municipal elections across the province.

== Elgin County Council ==
Elgin County Council consists of the mayors of the constituent municipalities plus the deputy mayors of Central Elgin and Malahide.

Position	Elected
Aylmer Mayor	Mary French
Bayham Mayor	Edward Ketchabaw (acclaimed)
Central Elgin Mayor	Sally Martyn
Central Elgin Deputy Mayor	Tom Marks
Dutton/Dunwich Mayor	Bob Purcell
Malahide Mayor	Dave Mennill (acclaimed)
Malahide Deputy Mayor	Dominique Giguere
Southwold Mayor	Grant Jones
West Elgin Mayor	Duncan McPhail

== Aylmer ==
Mayoral Candidate	Vote	%
Mary French	911	62.57
Barbara Ann Laur	545	37.43

== Bayham ==
Mayoral Candidate	Vote	%
Edward Ketchabaw	Acclaimed	

== Central Elgin ==
Mayoral Candidate	Vote	%
Sally Martyn	2,046	47.73
David Marr (X)	1,752	40.87
Casey Siebenmorgen	489	11.41

== Dutton/Dunwich ==
Mayoral Candidate	Vote	%
Bob Purcell	736	50.03
Cameron McWilliam (X)	735	49.97

== Malahide ==
Mayoral Candidate	Vote	%
Dave Mennill (X)	Acclaimed	

== Southwold ==
Mayoral Candidate	Vote	%
Grant Jones (X)	1,074	65.53
Ian Chard	565	34.47

== West Elgin ==
Mayoral Candidate	Vote	%
Duncan McPhail	1,113	63.71
Bernie Wiehle (X)	337	19.29
Mary Bodnar	297	17.00
