= 2018 Prescott and Russell United Counties municipal elections =

Elections were held in Prescott and Russell United Counties, Ontario on October 22, 2018 in conjunction with municipal elections across the province.

== Prescott and Russell United Counties Council ==
The Council consists of the mayors of the eight constituent municipalities:

Municipality	Mayor
Alfred and Plantagenet	Stéphane Sarrazin
Casselman	Daniel Lafleur (acclaimed)
Champlain	Normand Riopel
Clarence-Rockland	Guy Desjardins
East Hawkesbury	Robert Kirby (acclaimed)
Hawkesbury	Paula Assaly
Russell	Pierre Leroux
The Nation	François St-Amour

== Alfred and Plantagenet ==
Mayoral Candidate	Vote	%
Stéphane Sarrazin	2,074	55.65
Jean-Pierre Cadieux	1,653	44.35

== Casselman ==
Mayoral Candidate	Vote	%
Daniel Lafleur	Acclaimed	

== Champlain ==
Mayoral Candidate	Vote	%
Normand Riopel	1,676	36.43
Paul Emile Duval	1,574	34.22
Helen MacLeod	748	16.26
Urbano Fumagalli	602	13.09

== Clarence-Rockland ==
Mayoral Candidate	Vote	%
Guy Desjardins (X)	6,071	80.11
Donald Veilleux	1,507	19.89

== East Hawkesbury ==
Mayoral Candidate	Vote	%
Robert Kirby (X)	Acclaimed	

== Hawkesbury ==
Mayoral Candidate	Vote	%
Paula Assaly	2,297	53.05
Jeanne Charlebois (X)	1,485	34.30
Gilbert Cyr	548	12.66

== Russell ==
Mayoral Candidate	Vote	%
Pierre Leroux (X)	3,204	53.20
Shawn McNally	2,053	34.09
Charles Armstrong	765	12.70

=== Councillors ===
There are 4 seats being contested for Russell Town Council.

Councillors Candidate	Vote	%	Slogan	Profession
Jamie Laurin	3299		?	?
André Brisson	3066		A vote for the future	Former farmer
Cindy Saucier	2975		?	?
Mike Tarnowski	2634		Moving Forward	?
Isabelle St-Amour	2440		Community First	Teacher
Nicolas Daoust	1984		A voice for you	?
Richard Kargus	1763		?	Lawyer
Richard (Rick) Renaud	779		?	?
Marc-Antoine Gagnier	458		Your Future Your Choice	Author and former provincial independent candidate in 2014

== The Nation ==
Mayoral Candidate	Vote	%
François St-Amour (X)	1,855	38.82
Danika Bourgeois-Desnoyers	1,468	30.72
Denis Pommainville	1,456	30.47
