= 2018 Rainy River District municipal elections =

Elections were held in the organized municipalities in the Rainy River District of Ontario on October 22, 2018 in conjunction with municipal elections across the province.

== Alberton ==
Reeve Candidate	Vote	%
Michael Ford	176	50.57
Mike Hammond (X)	172	49.44

== Atikokan ==
Mayoral Candidate	Vote	%
Dennis Brown (X)	Acclaimed	

== Chapple ==
Reeve Candidate	Vote	%
Rilla Race	86	42.79
Gary Judson	66	32.84
Robert Barron	39	19.40
Stefan Szeder	10	4.98

== Dawson ==
Mayoral Candidate	Vote	%
Bill Langner (X)	Acclaimed	

== Emo ==
Mayoral Candidate	Vote	%
Harold McQuaker	340	56.67
Michael Loney	137	22.83
Vincent Sheppard	123	20.50

== Fort Frances ==
Mayoral Candidate	Vote	%
June Caul	1,808	67.24
Kenneth Perry	881	32.76

== Lake of the Woods ==
Mayoral Candidate	Vote	%
Colleen Fadden (X)	Acclaimed	

== La Vallee ==
Reeve Candidate	Vote	%
Ken McKinnon (X)	124	36.36
Ross Donaldson	89	26.10
Lucille MacDonald	83	24.34
Ken Hyatt	45	13.20

== Morley ==
Reeve Candidate	Vote	%
George Heyens (X)	Acclaimed	

== Rainy River ==
Mayoral Candidate	Vote	%
Debbie Ewald (X)	Acclaimed	
