= 2018 Perth County municipal elections =

Canadian local election

Elections were held in Perth County, Ontario on October 22, 2018, in conjunction with municipal elections across the province.

== Perth County Council ==
Perth County Council consists of 10 members and uses a weighted voting method so that member's votes match the populations of the constituent communities.

Position	Elected	Weighted votes
Perth East Mayor	Rhonda Ehgoetz	2
Perth East Deputy Mayor	Hugh McDermid	2
Perth East Councillor	Appointed by Township Council	2
Perth South Mayor	Robert Wilhelm	1
Perth South Deputy Mayor	Appointed by Township Council	1
West Perth Mayor	Walter McKenzie (acclaimed)	2
West Perth Deputy Mayor	Doug Eidt	2
North Perth Mayor	Todd Kasenberg	2
North Perth Deputy Mayor	Doug Kellum (acclaimed)	2

== North Perth ==
Mayoral Candidate	Vote	%
Todd Kasenberg	1,874	64.35
David Ludington	1,038	35.65

== Perth East ==
Mayoral Candidate	Vote	%
Rhonda Ehgoetz	1,903	54.70
Bob McMillan (X)	1,276	36.68
Barry Ford Nowack Jr.	300	8.62

== Perth South ==
Mayoral Candidate	Vote	%
Robert Wilhelm (X)	1,011	81.73
Roger Fuhr	226	18.27

== West Perth ==
Mayoral Candidate	Vote	%
Walter McKenzie (X)	Acclaimed	
