= 2018 Timiskaming District municipal elections =

Elections were held in the organized municipalities in the Timiskaming District of Ontario on October 22, 2018, in conjunction with municipal elections across the province.

== Armstrong ==
Mayoral Candidate	Vote	%
Jean Marc Boileau	340	79.63
Reynald Rivard	87	20.37

== Brethour ==
Reeve Candidate	Vote	%
David White	Acclaimed	

== Casey ==
Reeve Candidate	Vote	%
Guy Labonte (X)	Acclaimed	

== Chamberlain ==
Reeve Candidate	Vote	%
Kerry Stewart (X)	Acclaimed	

== Charlton and Dack ==
Reeve Candidate	Vote	%
Merrill Bond (X)	Acclaimed	

== Cobalt ==
Mayoral Candidate	Vote	%
George Othmer	187	40.92
Tina Sartoretto (X)	138	30.20
Helene Culhane	132	28.88

== Coleman ==
Mayoral Candidate	Vote	%
Dan Cleroux (X)	Acclaimed	

== Englehart ==
Mayoral Candidate	Vote	%
Nina Wallace (X)	367	69.64
Gary Schaap	160	30.36

== Evanturel ==
Reeve Candidate	Vote	%
Derek Mundle (X)	Acclaimed	

== Gauthier ==
Reeve Candidate	Vote	%
Marie Savarie	Acclaimed	

== Harley ==
Reeve Candidate	Vote	%
Pauline Archambault (X)	Acclaimed	

== Harris ==
Reeve Candidate	Vote	%
Chantal Despres (X)	Acclaimed	

== Hilliard ==
Reeve Candidate	Vote	%
Laurie Bolesworth	41	52.56
Morgan Carson (X)	37	47.44

== Hudson ==
Reeve Candidate	Vote	%
Larry Craig (X)	Acclaimed	

== James ==
Reeve Candidate	Vote	%
Terry Fiset (X)	139	57.20
Fred Pritchard	104	42.80

== Kerns ==
Reeve Candidate	Vote	%
Terry Phillips (X)	Acclaimed	

== Kirkland Lake ==
Mayoral Candidate	Vote	%
Pat Kiely	1,875	72.25
Todd Morgan	720	27.75

== Larder Lake ==
Mayoral Candidate	Vote	%
Patricia Quinn	229	60.26
Gary Cunnington (X)	151	39.74

== Latchford ==
Mayoral Candidate	Vote	%
George Lefebvre (X)	152	66.09
Michael Pelangio	78	33.91

== Matachewan ==
Reeve Candidate	Vote	%
Anne Commando-Dubé	77	39.29
Cheryl Drummond (X)	71	36.22
Raymond Bisson	27	13.78
Joe Bisson	21	10.71

== McGarry ==
After a tied vote, and a recount confirmed the tie, a random draw was held to select the mayor, which Matt Reimer won.

Reeve Candidate	Vote	%
Matt Reimer	181	50.00
Bonita Culhane	181	50.00

== Temiskaming Shores ==
Mayoral Candidate	Vote	%
Carman Kidd (X)	2,084	84.17
Michael Woods	392	15.83

== Thornloe ==
Reeve Candidate	Vote	%
Earl Read (X)	Acclaimed	
