= 2018 Lennox and Addington County municipal elections =

Local election in Ontario, Canada

Elections were held in Lennox and Addington County, Ontario on October 22, 2018 in conjunction with municipal elections across the province.

== Lennox and Addington County Council ==
The County Council consists of the three municipal reeves, mayor of Greater Napanee and the three deputy reeves and the Deputy Reeve of Greater Napanee.

Position	Elected
Addington Highlands Reeve	Henry Hogg
Addington Highlands Deputy Reeve	Selected from council
Greater Napanee Mayor	Marg Isbester
Greater Napanee Deputy Mayor	Max Kaiser
Loyalist Mayor	Ric Bresee
Loyalist Deputy Mayor	Jamie Hegadorn
Stone Mills Reeve	Eric Smith
Stone Mills Deputy Reeve	John Wise

== Addington Highlands ==
Reeve Candidate	Vote	%
Henry Hogg (X)	769	54.08
Alice Madigan	653	45.92

== Greater Napanee ==
Mayoral Candidate	Vote	%
Marg Isbester	2,325	38.50
Brian Calver	2,119	35.09
A. Sam Salaam	882	14.61
Gavin Cross	377	6.24
Gerry Haggerty	336	5.56

== Loyalist ==
Mayoral Candidate	Vote	%
Ric Bresee	2,389	55.02
Lorna Willis	1,370	31.55
Joy Silver	583	13.43

== Stone Mills ==
Reeve Candidate	Vote	%
Eric Smith (X)	1,500	50.71
Ted Darby	940	31.78
Doug Bearance	518	17.51
