= 2018 Huron County municipal elections =

Local election in Ontario, Canada

Elections took place in Huron County, Ontario on October 22, 2018 in conjunction with municipal elections across the province.

== Huron County Council ==
Huron County Council consists of the Mayors and Reeves of each constituent municipality, plus deputy mayors, deputy reeves for all municipalities except Howick, Morris-Turnberry and North Huron

Position	Elected
Ashfield-Colborne-Wawanosh Reeve	Glen McNeil (acclaimed)
Ashfield-Colborne-Wawanosh Deputy Reeve	Roger Watt (acclaimed)
Bluewater Mayor	Paul Klopp
Bluewater Deputy Mayor	Jim Ferguson
Central Huron Mayor	Jim Ginn (acclaimed)
Central Huron Deputy Mayor	David Jewitt
Goderich Mayor	John Grace
Goderich Deputy Mayor	Myles Murdock
Howick Reeve	Doug Harding
Huron East Mayor	Bernie MacLellan
Huron East Deputy Mayor	(selected from council)
Morris-Turnberry Mayor	Jamie K. Heffer (acclaimed)
North Huron Reeve	Bernie Bailey
South Huron Mayor	George Finch
South Huron Deputy Mayor	Jim Dietrich

== Ashfield-Colborne-Wawanosh ==
Reeve Candidate	Vote	%
Glen McNeil	Acclaimed	

== Bluewater ==
Mayoral Candidate	Vote	%
Paul Klopp	2,259	60.24
Tyler Hessel (X)	1,491	39.76

== Central Huron ==
Mayoral Candidate	Vote	%
Jim Ginn (X)	Acclaimed	

== Goderich ==
Mayoral Candidate	Vote	%
John Grace	1,940	50.04
David Yates	1,042	26.88
Kevin Morrison (X)	895	23.08

== Howick ==
Reeve Candidate	Vote	%
Doug Harding	806	70.58
Rosemary Rognvaldson	174	15.24
Robert Clarkson	162	14.19

== Huron East ==
Mayoral Candidate	Vote	%
Bernie MacLellan (X)	1,414	54.09
Caitlin Gillis	1,200	45.91

== Morris-Turnberry ==
Mayoral Candidate	Vote	%
Jamie K. Heffer	Acclaimed	

== North Huron ==
Reeve Candidate	Vote	%
Bernie Bailey	1,337	69.45
Neil G. Vincent (X)	588	30.55

== South Huron ==
Mayoral Candidate	Vote	%
George Finch	2,257	55.82
Maureen Cole (X)	1,198	29.63
Dave Frayne	532	13.16
Tom Oke	56	1.39
