= 2018 Dufferin County municipal elections =

Local election in Ontario, Canada

Elections were held in Dufferin County, Ontario on October 22, 2018, in conjunction with municipal elections across the province.

== Dufferin County Council ==
Dufferin County Council has 14 members, two from each constituent municipality except for East Garafraxa and East Luther Grand Valley which elect just one member.

Position	Elected
Amaranth Mayor	Bob Currie
Amaranth Deputy Mayor	Chris Gerrits (acclaimed)
East Garafraxa Mayor	Guy Gardhouse (acclaimed)
Grand Valley Mayor	Steve Soloman (acclaimed)
Melancthon Mayor	Darren White (acclaimed)
Melancthon Deputy Mayor	David Besley
Mono Mayor	Laura Ryan
Mono Deputy Mayor	John Creelman
Mulmur Mayor	Janet Horner
Mulmur Deputy Mayor	Earl Hawkins
Orangeville Mayor	Sandy Brown
Orangeville Deputy Mayor	Andy Macintosh
Shelburne Mayor	Wade Mills (acclaimed)
Shelburne Deputy Mayor	Wade Mills

== Amaranth ==
Mayoral Candidate	Vote	%
Bob Currie	737	54.75
Don MacIver (X)	609	45.25

== East Garafraxa ==
Mayoral Candidate	Vote	%
Guy Gardhouse (X)	Acclaimed	

== Grand Valley ==
Mayoral Candidate	Vote	%
Steve Soloman (X)	Acclaimed	

== Melancthon ==
Mayoral Candidate	Vote	%
Darren White (X)	Acclaimed	

== Mono ==
Mayoral Candidate	Vote	%
Laura Ryan (X)	1,770	77.23
Stephen Unwin	522	22.77

== Mulmur ==
=== Mayor ===
Mayoral Candidate	Vote	%
Janet Horner	887	59.21
Paul Mills (X)	611	40.79

=== Deputy Mayor ===
Deputy Mayoral Candidate	Vote	%
Earl Hawkins (X)	862	57%
Keith Lowry	609	40%

=== Councillors ===
3 to be elected

Councillor Candidate	Vote	%
Shirley Boxem	1021	67%
Patricia Clark	886	58%
Ken Cufaro	837	55%
Jim deMelo	778	51%

== Orangeville ==
Mayoral Candidate	Vote	%
Sandy Brown	3,413	43.73
Darrin Davidson	2,914	37.34
Jeremy D. Williams (X)	1,477	18.93

== Shelburne ==
Mayoral Candidate	Vote	%
Wade Mills	Acclaimed	
