= 2018 Hastings County municipal elections =

Local election in Ontario, Canada

Elections were held in Hastings County, Ontario on October 22, 2018, in conjunction with municipal elections across the province.

== Hastings County Council ==
Hastings County Council consists of the mayors and reeves of the 14 constituent municipalities.

Elected	Position
Bancroft Mayor	Paul Jenkins
Carlow/Mayo Reeve	Bonnie Adams (acclaimed)
Centre Hastings Mayor	Tom Deline (acclaimed)
Deseronto Mayor	Dan Johnston (acclaimed)
Faraday Reeve	Dennis J. Purcell (acclaimed)
Hastings Highlands Mayor	Vic A. Bodnar
Limerick Reeve	Carl Stefanski
Madoc Reeve	Loyde Blackburn
Marmora and Lake Mayor	Jan O'Neill
Stirling-Rawdon Mayor	Bob Mullin
Tudor and Cashel Reeve	Libby Clarke
Tweed Mayor	Jo-Anne Albert
Tyendinaga Reeve	Rick Phillips
Wollaston Reeve	Barbara Shaw

== Bancroft ==
Mayoral Candidate	Vote	%
Paul Jenkins (X)	926	59.63
Mary Kavanagh	627	40.37

== Carlow/Mayo ==
Reeve Candidate	Vote	%
Bonnie Adams (X)	Acclaimed	

== Centre Hastings ==
Mayoral Candidate	Vote	%
Tom Deline (X)	Acclaimed	

== Deseronto ==
Mayoral Candidate	Vote	%
Dan Johnston	Acclaimed	

== Faraday ==
Reeve Candidate	Vote	%
Dennis J. Purcell	Acclaimed	

== Hastings Highlands ==
Mayoral Candidate	Vote	%
Vic A. Bodnar	1,111	41.99
Vivian Bloom (X)	826	31.22
Joseph Shulman	709	26.80

== Limerick ==
Reeve Candidate	Vote	%
Carl Stefanski	160	50.47
Mike Douglas-Hecker (X)	157	49.53

== Madoc ==
Reeve Candidate	Vote	%
Loyde Blackburn	452	55.6
John Kirkland	361	44.4

== Marmora and Lake ==
Mayoral Candidate	Vote	%
Jan O'Neill	888	48.87
Linda Bracken	734	40.40
James A. Smith	195	10.73

== Stirling-Rawdon ==
Mayoral Candidate	Vote	%
Bob Mullin	1,197	63.03
Dean Graff	537	28.28
Theresa Jo-Anne O'Heir	165	8.69

== Tudor and Cashel ==
Reeve Candidate	Vote	%
Libby Clarke	381	68.16
Douglas Davidson	178	31.84

== Tweed ==
Mayoral Candidate	Vote	%
Jo-Anne Albert (X)	1,482	61.34
Justin Bray	934	38.66

== Tyendinaga ==
Reeve Candidate	Vote	%
Rick Phillips (X)	1,029	60.82
Sue Munro	663	39.18

== Wollaston ==
Reeve Candidate	Vote	%
Barbara Shaw	657	45.00
Graham Blair (X)	583	39.93
Michael Fuerth	220	15.07
