= 2018 Simcoe County municipal elections =

Local election in Ontario, Canada

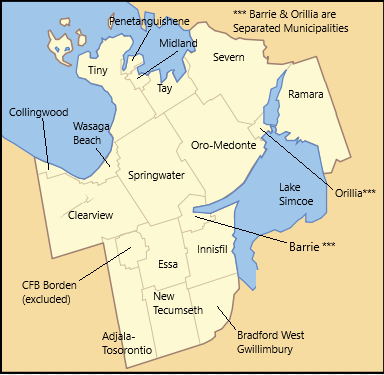
Map of Simcoe County, its component municipalities, Separated municipalities and CFB Borden.

Elections were held in Simcoe County, Ontario on October 22, 2018 in conjunction with municipal elections across the province.

== Simcoe County Council ==
The county council consists of the mayors and deputy mayors of the municipalities.

| Office | Elected |
|---|---|
| Mayor of Adjala-Tosorontio | Floyd Pinto |
| Deputy Mayor of Adjala-Tosorontio | Bob Meadows |
| Mayor of Bradford West Gwillimbury | Rob Kreffer |
| Deputy Mayor of Bradford West Gwillimbury | James Leduc |
| Mayor of Clearview | Doug Measures |
| Deputy Mayor of Clearview | Barry Burton (acclaimed) |
| Mayor of Collingwood | Brian Saunderson |
| Deputy Mayor of Collingwood | Keith Hull |
| Mayor of Essa | Sandie Macdonald |
| Deputy Mayor of Essa | Michael Smith |
| Mayor of Innisfil | Lynn Dollin |
| Deputy Mayor of Innisfil | Daniel Davidson |
| Mayor of Midland | Stewart Strathearn |
| Deputy Mayor of Midland | Mike Ross |
| Mayor of New Tecumseth | Rick Milne |
| Deputy Mayor of New Tecumseth | Richard Norcross |
| Mayor of Oro-Medonte | Harry Hughes |
| Deputy Mayor of Oro-Medonte | Scott Jermey |
| Mayor of Penetanguishene | Doug Leroux |
| Deputy Mayor of Penetanguishene | Anita Dubeau |
| Mayor of Ramara | Basil Clarke |
| Deputy Mayor of Ramara | John O'Donnell |
| Mayor of Severn | Mike Burkett (acclaimed) |
| Deputy Mayor of Severn | Jane Dunlop (acclaimed) |
| Mayor of Springwater | Don Allen |
| Deputy Mayor of Springwater | Jennifer Coughlin |
| Mayor of Tay | Ted Walker |
| Deputy Mayor of Tay | Jim Crawford |
| Mayor of Tiny | George Cornell (acclaimed) |
| Deputy Mayor of Tiny | Steffen Walma (acclaimed) |
| Mayor of Wasaga Beach | Nina Bifolchi |
| Deputy Mayor of Wasaga Beach | Sylvia Bray |

== Adjala-Tosorontio ==
=== Mayor ===
| Mayoral Candidate | Vote | % |
|---|---|---|
| Floyd Pinto | 2,361 | 57.98 |
| Doug Little | 1,711 | 42.02 |

== Bradford West Gwillimbury ==
Due to technical delays with internet voting, the voting period in Bradford West Gwillimbury was extended to October 23.

=== Mayor ===
| Mayoral Candidate | Vote | % |
|---|---|---|
| Rob Keffer (X) | 7,283 | 89.78 |
| Pat Roberge | 829 | 10.22 |

== Clearview ==
=== Mayor ===
| Mayoral Candidate | Vote | % |
|---|---|---|
| Doug Measures | 2,565 | 56.60 |
| Christopher Vanderkruys (X) | 1,967 | 43.40 |

== Collingwood ==
Due to technical delays with internet voting, the voting period in Collingwood was extended to October 23.

=== Mayor ===
| Mayoral Candidate | Vote | % |
|---|---|---|
| Brian Saunderson | 5,065 | 54.03 |
| John Trude | 3,310 | 35.31 |
| Michael Blair | 999 | 10.66 |

== Essa ==
=== Mayor ===
| Mayoral Candidate | Vote | % |
|---|---|---|
| Sandie Macdonald | 2,813 | 76.07 |
| David Guergis | 885 | 23.93 |

== Innisfil ==
Due to technical delays with internet voting, the voting period in Innisfil was extended to October 23.

=== Mayor ===
| Mayoral Candidate | Vote | % |
|---|---|---|
| Lynn Dollin | 4,654 | 51.58 |
| Stan Daurio | 2,963 | 32.84 |
| Barb Baguley | 1,406 | 15.58 |

=== Deputy mayor ===
| Deputy Mayoral Candidate | Vote | % |
|---|---|---|
| Daniel Davidson | 2,603 | 29.42 |
| Henry Kooistra | 2,117 | 23.92 |
| Angela Gravelle | 1,492 | 16.86 |
| Paul Best | 1,336 | 15.10 |
| Steven Fishman | 1,301 | 14.70 |

=== Innisfil Town Council ===
| Candidate | Vote | % |
Ward 1
| Kevin Eisses | 693 | 69.37 |
| Linda Zanella | 306 | 30.63 |
Ward 2
| Bill Van Berkel | Acclaimed | |
Ward 3
| Donna Orsatti (X) | 1,038 | 64.00 |
| Tara Filteau | 584 | 36.00 |
Ward 4
| Alex Waters | 401 | 29.57 |
| Matthew Kenney | 354 | 26.11 |
| Bill McConnell | 284 | 20.94 |
| Christian Pitcher | 272 | 20.06 |
| Inna Shafir | 45 | 3.32 |
Ward 5
| Kenneth Fowler | 510 | 61.45 |
| Jeffrey Rice | 320 | 38.55 |
Ward 6
| Carolyn Payne (X) | 826 | 56.65 |
| Marc Seguin | 632 | 43.35 |
Ward 7
| Rob Nicol (X) | 1,109 | 72.44 |
| Don Tata | 422 | 27.56 |

Source for unofficial results:

== Midland ==
=== Mayor ===
| Mayoral Candidate | Vote | % |
|---|---|---|
| Stewart M. Strathearn | 1,851 | 40.04 |
| Jack Contin | 1,617 | 34.98 |
| Bob Jeffery | 1,155 | 24.98 |

== New Tecumseth ==
=== Mayor ===
| Mayoral Candidate | Vote | % |
|---|---|---|
| Rick Milne (X) | 5,959 | 63.92 |
| Tony Veltri | 3,364 | 36.08 |

== Oro-Medonte ==
=== Mayor ===
| Mayoral Candidate | Vote | % |
|---|---|---|
| Harry Hughes (X) | 3,011 | 39.03 |
| John Crawford | 2,477 | 32.11 |
| Sandy Agnew | 2,226 | 28.86 |

== Penetanguishene ==
Due to technical delays with internet voting, the voting period in Pentetanguishene was extended to October 23.

=== Mayor ===
| Mayoral Candidate | Vote | % |
|---|---|---|
| Douglas R. Leroux | 2,033 | 74.12 |
| Gerry Marshall (X) | 710 | 25.88 |

== Ramara ==
=== Mayor ===
| Mayoral Candidate | Vote | % |
|---|---|---|
| Basil Clarke (X) | 2,126 | 50.17 |
| Marg Sharpe | 2,112 | 49.83 |

== Severn ==
=== Mayor ===
| Mayoral Candidate | Vote | % |
|---|---|---|
| Mike Burkett (X) | Acclaimed | |

== Springwater ==
=== Mayor ===
| Mayoral Candidate | Vote | % |
|---|---|---|
| Don Allen | 2,472 | 41.9 |
| Bill French (X) | 2,390 | 40.5 |
| Tony Guergis | 1,041 | 17.6 |

== Tay ==
=== Mayor ===
| Mayoral Candidate | Vote | % |
|---|---|---|
| Ted Walker | 2,517 | 67.68 |
| David Ritchie | 1,202 | 32.32 |

== Tiny ==
=== Mayor ===
| Mayoral Candidate | Vote | % |
|---|---|---|
| George Cornell (X) | Acclaimed | |

== Wasaga Beach ==
=== Mayor ===
| Mayoral Candidate | Vote | % |
|---|---|---|
| Nina Bifolchi | 6,101 | 60.51 |
| Brian Smith (X) | 3,981 | 39.49 |
