= 2018 Sudbury District municipal elections =

Municipal elections in Sudbury, Ontario, Canada

Elections were held in the organized municipalities in the Sudbury District of Ontario on October 22, 2018 in conjunction with municipal elections across the province.

== Baldwin ==
Reeve Candidate	Vote	%
Vern Gorham (X)	Acclaimed	

== Chapleau ==
Mayoral Candidate	Vote	%
Michael Levesque (X)	548	53.67
Ryan Bignucolo	473	46.33

== Espanola ==
Mayoral Candidate	Vote	%
Jill Beer	1,136	60.07
Ron Piche (X)	755	39.93

== French River ==
Mayoral Candidate	Vote	%
Gisèle Pageau	1,232	58.39
Maurice Corriveau	517	24.50
Michel Bigras	361	17.11

== Killarney ==
Mayoral Candidate	Vote	%
Ginny Rook (X)	274	51.99
Geoff Cosh	253	48.01

== Markstay-Warren ==
Mayoral Candidate	Vote	%
Sal Salonin (X)	557	59.57
Sonja Flynn	378	40.43

== Nairn and Hyman ==
Mayoral Candidate	Vote	%
Laurier Falldien (X)	Acclaimed	

== Sables-Spanish Rivers ==
Mayoral Candidate	Vote	%
Leslie Gamble (X)	370	36.78
Harry Hobbs	296	29.42
David Wolff	271	26.94
Doug Steinke	69	6.86

== St. Charles ==
Mayoral Candidate	Vote	%
Paul Schoppmann (X)	486	55.93
Phil Belanger	383	44.07
