= 2018 Lanark County municipal elections =

Local election in Ontario, Canada

Elections were held in Lanark County, Ontario on October 22, 2018 in conjunction with municipal elections across the province.

== Lanark County Council ==
Lanark County Council consists of two members from each constituent municipality.

Position	Elected
Beckwith Reeve	Richard Kidd (acclaimed)
Beckwith Deputy Reeve	Sharon Mousseau (acclaimed)
Carleton Place Mayor	Douglas Black
Carleton Place Deputy Mayor	Douglas Black
Drummond/North Elmsley Reeve	Stephen M. Fournier (acclaimed)
Drummond/North Elmsley Deputy Reeve	(selected from council)
Lanark Highlands Mayor	Peter McLaren
Lanark Higlands Deputy Mayor	John Hall
Mississippi Mills Mayor	Christa Lowry
Mississippi Mills Deputy Mayor	John Levi
Montague Reeve	Bill Dobson
Montague Deputy Reeve	Klaas Van Der Meer
Perth Mayor	John Fenik
Perth Deputy Mayor	Ed McPherson
Tay Valley Reeve	Brian Campbell
Tay Valley Deputy Reeve	Barrie Crampton

== Beckwith ==
Reeve Candidate	Vote	%
Richard Kidd (X)	Acclaimed	

== Carleton Place ==
Mayoral Candidate	Vote	%
Douglas Black	2,389	58.68
Ralph Lee	1,003	24.64
Louis Antonakos (X)	635	15.60
Roland Wutherich	44	1.08

== Drummond/North Elmsley ==
Reeve Candidate	Vote	%
Stephen M. Fournier	Acclaimed	

== Lanark Highlands ==
Mayoral Candidate	Vote	%
Peter McLaren	1,472	49.98
Terry Lee Donaldson	1,067	36.23
Brian Stewart (X)	406	13.79

== Mississippi Mills ==
Mayoral Candidate	Vote	%
Christa Lowry	2,798	44.08
Steve Maynard	1,566	24.67
Paul Watters	1,478	23.29
Ken Laframboise	505	7.96

== Montague ==
Reeve Candidate	Vote	%
Bill Dobson (X)	953	65.05
Pat Dolan	512	34.95

== Perth ==
Mayoral Candidate	Vote	%
John Fenik (X)	867	37.24
John Gemmell	788	33.85
Jim Boldt	673	28.91

== Tay Valley ==
Reeve Candidate	Vote	%
Brian Campbell	1,581	46.34
Susan Freeman	1,234	36.17
Keith Kerr (X)	597	17.50
