= 2014 Muskoka District municipal elections =

Elections were held in the Muskoka District Municipality of Ontario on October 27, 2014 in conjunction with municipal elections across the province.

== Muskoka District Council ==
Consists of a chair plus mayors of the municipalities as well as a number of district councillors.

Position	Elected
Bracebridge Mayor	Graydon Smith
Bracebridge Councillor (At large)	Steven Clement
Bracebridge Councillor (At large)	Lori-Lynn Giaschi-Pacini
Bracebridge Councillor (At large)	Don Smith
Georgian Bay Mayor	Larry Braid
Georgian Bay Councillor - Wards 1 & 3	Paul Wiancko (acclaimed)
Georgian Bay Councillor - Wards 2 & 4	Peter Cooper
Gravenhurst Mayor	Paisley Donaldson
Gravenhurst Councillor (At large)	Sandy Cairns
Gravenhurst Councillor (At large)	Paul Kelly
Gravenhurst Councillor (At large)	Terry Pilger
Huntsville Mayor	Scott Aitchison
Huntsville Councillor (At large)	Nancy Alcock
Huntsville Councillor (At large)	Karin Terziano
Huntsville Councillor (At large)	Brian Thompson
Lake of Bays Mayor	Bob Young (acclaimed)
Lake of Bays Councillor - Franklin/Sinclair	Shane Baker (acclaimed)
Lake of Bays Councillor - Ridout/McLean	Robert Lacroix
Muskoka Lakes Mayor	Don Furniss
Muskoka Lakes Councillor - Ward A	Ruth-Ellen Nishikawa
Muskoka Lakes Councillor - Ward B	Allen Edwards (acclaimed)
Muskoka Lakes Councillor - Ward C	Phil Harding

== Bracebridge ==
Mayoral Candidate	Vote	%
Graydon Smith (X)	5,171	83.99
Phil Kolyn	986	16.01

== Georgian Bay ==
Mayoral Candidate	Vote	%
Larry Braid (X)	1,956	48.86
Louise Rivett	1,334	33.33
James Walden	713	17.81

== Gravenhurst ==
Mayoral Candidate	Vote	%
Paisley Donaldson (X)	3,803	80.23
Gordie Merton	937	19.77

== Huntsville ==
Mayoral Candidate	Vote	%
Scott Aitchison	3,708	45.39
Hugh Mackenzie	2,264	27.71
Tim Withey	2,198	26.90

== Lake of Bays ==
Mayoral Candidate	Vote	%
Bob Young (X)	Acclaimed	

== Muskoka Lakes ==
Mayoral Candidate	Vote	%
Don Furniss	4,152	56.57
Alice Murphy (X)	3,188	43.43
