= 2018 Lambton County municipal elections =

Local election in Ontario, Canada

Elections were held in Lambton County, Ontario on October 22, 2018 in conjunction with municipal elections across the province.

== Lambton County Council ==
County council includes the mayors of each constituent municipality, the deputy mayors of Lambton Shores and St. Clair plus four city councillors from Sarnia.

Position	Elected
Brooke-Alvinston Mayor	David Ferguson
Dawn-Euphemia Mayor	Alan Broad (acclaimed)
Enniskillen Mayor	Kevin Marriott (acclaimed)
Lambton Shores Mayor	Bill Weber
Lambton Shores Deputy Mayor	Doug Cook
Oil Springs Mayor	Ian Veen (acclaimed)
Petrolia Mayor	Brad Loosley
Plympton-Wyoming Mayor	Lonny Napper (acclaimed)
Point Edward Mayor	Bev Hand (acclaimed)
Sarnia Mayor	Mike Bradley
Sarnia Councillor	Dave Boushy
Sarnia Councillor	Mike Stark
Sarnia Councillor	Brian White
Sarnia Councillor	Margaret Bird
St. Clair Mayor	Steve Arnold
St. Clair Deputy Mayor	Steve Miller
Warwick Mayor	Jackie Rombouts

== Brooke-Alvinston ==
=== Mayor ===
Mayoral Candidate	Vote	%
David Ferguson	694	57.88
Tom Scott	410	34.20
Dawn Marie Nevills	54	4.50
Kenneth Dew	41	3.42

== Dawn-Euphemia ==
=== Mayor ===
Mayoral Candidate	Vote	%
Alan Broad (X)	Acclaimed	

== Enniskillen ==
=== Mayor ===
Mayoral Candidate	Vote	%
Kevin Marriott (X)	Acclaimed	

== Lambton Shores ==
=== Mayor ===
Mayoral Candidate	Vote	%
Bill Weber (X)	2,824	57.46
Doug Bonesteel	2,091	42.55

== Oil Springs ==
=== Mayor ===
Mayoral Candidate	Vote	%
Ian Veen (X)	Acclaimed	

== Petrolia ==
=== Mayor ===
Mayoral Candidate	Vote	%
Brad Loosley	1,110	49.38
Liz Welsh	747	33.23
Bob Maniuk	391	17.39

== Plympton-Wyoming ==
=== Mayor ===
Mayoral Candidate	Vote	%
Lonny Napper (X)	Acclaimed	

== Point Edward ==
=== Mayor ===
Mayoral Candidate	Vote	%
Bev Hand (X)	Acclaimed	

== Sarnia ==
Source for unofficial results:

=== Mayor ===
Mayoral Candidate	Vote	%
Mike Bradley (X)	16,238	65.49
Anne Marie Gillis	7,569	30.53
Kip Cuthbert	592	2.39
Fred Ingham	397	1.60

=== Sarnia City Council ===
==== City and County ====
Four to be elected

Candidate	Vote	%
Dave Boushy (X)	11,561	14.56
Mike Stark	9,723	12.24
Brian White (X)	8,462	10.65
Margaret Bird	8,206	10.33
Bev MacDougall (X)	7,878	9.92
Andy Bruziewicz (X)	7,103	8.94
Graham Pedregosa	6,785	8.54
Al Duffy	5,588	7.04
Ian A. J. Hope	4,469	5.63
Norm Francoeur	3,715	4.68
Cole Anderson	3,595	4.53
John Parker	2,341	2.95

==== City Council ====
Four to be elected

Candidate	Vote	%
Bill Dennis	8,038	9.53
Terry Burrell	6,231	7.39
Nathan Colquhoun	5,846	6.93
George Vandenberg	5,604	6.64
Meghan Reale	5,492	6.51
Michelle Nicole Parks	5,189	6.15
Joseph Thomas Santoro	4,664	5.53
Matt Mitro (X)	4,140	4.91
Susan Theresa MacFarlane	4,019	4.76
David Waters	3,500	4.15
Eric Dalziel	3,298	3.91
Melody Gibson	3,066	3.63
Gail M. White	2,800	3.32
John MacIntyre	2,539	2.80
Dave Potts	2,313	2.74
Bryan Trothen	2,296	2.72
Joe Hill	2,040	2.42
Marie Timperley	1,930	2.29
Janet Chynces	1,800	2.13
Steve Blair	1,754	2.08
Denise Robertson	1,464	1.74
Peter Athanasopoulos	1,350	1.60
Gregory Jones	1,268	1.50
Hawk Hawkins	1,126	1.33
Dan Joseph Harding	1,035	1.23
Matthew R. J. McDonald	927	1.10
M. B. Villanueva Jr.	602	0.71
Fanina Kodre	211	0.25

== St. Clair ==
=== Mayor ===
Mayoral Candidate	Vote	%
Steve Arnold (X)	3,239	57.53
Jeff Agar	1,941	34.48
Brian Everaert	344	6.11
Ed Linton	106	1.88

== Warwick ==
=== Mayor ===
Mayoral Candidate	Vote	%
Jackie Rombouts	668	53.06
John Couwenberg	591	46.94
