= 2018 Muskoka District municipal elections =

Elections in Ontario, Canada

Elections were held in the Muskoka District Municipality of Ontario on October 22, 2018 in conjunction with municipal elections across the province.

== Muskoka District Council ==
The Muskoka District Chair was originally intended to be elected by the voters in each of the municipalities. Incumbent Chair John Klinck as well as former Chairs Gord Adams and Hugh Mackenzie had filed to run for election as Chair. However, on the last day of the 2018 nomination period, Ontario Premier Doug Ford cancelled the separate election of the Muskoka District Chair. As a result, the Chair will instead be elected by members of the District Council on December 10, 2018.

Position	Elected
Chair
John Klinck
Bracebridge
Mayor	Graydon Smith
District Councillor	Don Smith
District Councillor	Rick Maloney
District Councillor	Steven Clement
Georgian Bay
Mayor	Peter Koetsier
District Councillor, Wards 1 & 3	Paul Wiancko
District Councillor, Wards 2 & 4	Peter Cooper
Gravenhurst
Mayor	Paul Kelly
District Councillor	Heidi Lorenz
District Councillor	Sandy Cairns
District Councillor	John Gordon
Huntsville
Mayor	Scott Aitchison
District Councillor	Nancy Alcock
District Councillor	Brian Thompson
District Councillor	Tim Withey
Lake of Bays
Mayor	Terry Glover
District Councillor, Ward 1	Mike Peppard
District Councillor, Ward 2	Robert Lacroix
Muskoka Lakes
Mayor	Phil Harding
District Councillor, Ward 1	Ruth-Ellen Nishikawa
District Councillor, Ward 2	Allen Edwards
District Councillor, Ward 3	Frank Jaglowitz

== Bracebridge ==
The following are the results for Bracebridge.

=== Mayor ===
Candidate	Vote	%
Graydon Smith (X)	4,457	75.88
Lori-Lynn Giaschi-Pacini	1,417	24.12

=== District Councillors ===
Three Regional Councillors were elected.

Candidate	Vote	%
Don Smith	4,325	
Rick Maloney	4,258	
Steven Clement	4,195	
Rick Hallam	1,749	

=== Local Councillors ===
Four Local Councillors were elected in 1 of 4 wards.

Candidate	Vote	%
Ward 1
Chris Wilson	766	
Kimberly Hayes-Rogers	395	
Ward 2
Mark Quemby	1,206	
Michael Gooch	696	
Ward 3
Andrew Struthers	514	
Tom Young	482	
Paul Everitt	399	
Ruthann Cook	272	
Ward 4
Archie Buie	Acclaimed	

== Georgian Bay ==
The following are the results for Georgian Bay.

=== Mayor ===
Candidate	Vote	%
Peter Koetsier	2,268	63.42
Larry Braid (X)	1,308	36.58

=== District Councillors ===
Two District Councillors were elected in 1 of 2 wards.

Candidate	Vote	%
Wards 1 & 3
Paul Wiancko	1,189	
Kristian Graziano	877	
Wards 2 & 4
Peter Cooper	1,010	
Alan Waffle	449	

=== Local Councillors ===
Four Local Councillors were elected in 1 of 4 wards.

Candidate	Vote	%
Ward 1
Cynthia Douglas	638	
Louise Rivett	235	
Ward 2
Stephen Jarvis	Acclaimed	
Ward 3
Brian Bochek	747	
Susan Stokes	464	
Ward 4
Allan Hazelton	451	
Kathy Kay	359	

== Gravenhurst ==
The following are the results for Gravenhurst.

=== Mayor ===
Candidate	Vote	%
Paul Kelly	Acclaimed	

=== District Councillors ===
Three Regional Councillors were elected.

Candidate	Vote	%
Heidi Lorenz	2,809	
Sandy Cairns	2,791	
John Gordon	2,382	
Randy Jorgensen	2,335	

=== Local Councillors ===
Five Local Councillors were elected in 1 of 5 wards.

Candidate	Vote	%
Ward 1
Penny Varney	897	
Murray McKeown	192	
Gordie Merton	177	
Ward 2
Jo Morphy	373	
Erin Either	295	
Ward 3
Steven Klinck	Acclaimed	
Ward 4
Terry Pilger	387	
Marc Mantha	249	
Ward 5
Graeme Murray	623	
Audrey van Petegem	339	

== Huntsville ==
The following are the results for Huntsville.

=== Mayor ===
Candidate	Vote	%
Scott Aitchison (X)	5,318	81.83
Peggy Peterson	1,181	18.17

=== District Councillors ===
Three Regional Councillors were elected.

Candidate	Vote	%
Nancy Alcock	3,931	
Brian Thompson	3,258	
Tim Withey	3,081	
Helena Renwick	2,961	
Bob Stone	2,944	
Lillian Fraser	888	

=== Local Councillors ===
Five Local Councillors were elected in 1 of 4 wards.

Candidate	Vote	%
Ward 1 - Huntsville
Karin Terziano	Acclaimed	
Ward 2 - Chaffey
Jonathan Wiebe	Acclaimed	
Ward 3 - Stisted, Stephenson, & Port Sydney (Two Councillors are Elected)
Jason Fitzgerald	878	
Dione Schumacher	752	
Wanda Lumley	372	
Larry Horton	322	
Charles Wilson	314	
Ward 4 - Brunel
Daniel Armour	993	
Ken Inglis	323	

== Lake of Bays ==
The following are the results for Lake of Bays.

=== Mayor ===
Candidate	Vote	%
Terry Glover	1,434	47.37
Bob Young (X)	1,346	44.47
Charles Cooper	247	8.16

=== District Councillors ===
Two District Councillors were elected in 1 of 2 wards.

Candidate	Vote	%
Ward 1 - Franklin/Sinclair
Mike Peppard	956	
Martin Mann	545	
Ward 2 - Ridout/McLean
Robert Lacroix	Acclaimed	

=== Local Councillors ===
Four Local Councillors were elected in 1 of 4 wards.

Candidate	Vote	%
Ward 1 - Franklin
Nancy Tapley	759	
Charles Deacon	298	
Ward 2 - Sinclair
Rick Brooks	259	
Norman Dyer	155	
Gloria Schimmel	121	
Ward 3 - Ridout
Penny McEachern	461	
Henry McClelland	143	
Ward 4 - McLean
Jacqueline Godard	323	
Anastasia O'Hare	308	
Michelle MacIsaac	177	

== Muskoka Lakes ==
The following are the results for Muskoka Lakes.

=== Mayor ===
Candidate	Vote	%
Phil Harding	5,324	77.11
Donald Furniss (X)	1,236	17.90
Terry Ledger	344	4.98

=== District & Town Councillors ===
Three District & Town Councillors were elected in 1 of 3 wards.

Candidate	Vote	%
Ward 1
Ruth-Ellen Nishikawa	1,142	
Gord Carlton	349	
Brian Mayer	79	
Ward 2
Allen Edwards	1,756	
Larrie MacRae	296	
Ward 3
Frank Jaglowitz	2,578	
Jean-Ann Baranik	517	

=== Local Councillors ===
Six Local Councillors were elected in 1 of 3 wards (2 in each ward).

Candidate	Vote	%
Ward 1
Glenn Zavitz	1,221	
Donelda Hayes	1,171	
Sandy Currie	314	
Ward 2
Susan Marzan	1,602	
Gordon Roberts	1,536	
Jason Harnett	357	
Linda Barrick-Spearn	347	
Ward 3
Barb Bridgeman	2,532	
Peter Kelley	2,502	
W. Ron Brett	407	
Jeff Mole	202	
