= 2018 Grey County municipal elections =

Local election in Ontario, Canada

Elections were held in Grey County, Ontario on October 22, 2018 in conjunction with municipal elections across the province.

== Grey County Council ==
The Grey County Council consists of the mayors and deputy mayors of each of the constituent communities.

Position	Elected
Chatsworth Mayor	Scott Mackey (acclaimed)
Chatsworth Deputy Mayor	Brian Gamble (acclaimed)
Georgian Bluffs Mayor	Dwight Burley
Georgian Bluffs Deputy Mayor	Sue Carleton (acclaimed)
Grey Highlands Mayor	Paul McQueen
Grey Highlands Deputy Mayor	Aakash Desai
Hanover Mayor	Sue Paterson
Hanover Deputy Mayor	Selwyn Hicks
Meaford Mayor	Barb Clumpus
Meaford Deputy Mayor	Shirley Keaveney
Owen Sound Mayor	Ian Boddy
Owen Sound Deputy Mayor	Brian O'Leary
Southgate Mayor	John Woodbury
Southgate Deputy Mayor	Brian Milne
The Blue Mountains Mayor	Alar Soever
The Blue Mountains Deputy Mayor	Odette Bartnicki
West Grey Mayor	Christine Robinson
West Grey Deputy Mayor	Tom Hutchinson

== The Blue Mountains ==
Mayoral Candidate	Vote	%
Alar Soever	2,029	42.72
Gail Ardiel	1,505	31.69
David Wilding-Davies	1,215	25.58

== Chatsworth ==
Mayoral Candidate	Vote	%
Scott Mackey	Acclaimed	

== Georgian Bluffs ==
Mayoral Candidate	Vote	%
Dwight Burley	2,005	55.28
Scott William Catto	1,622	44.72

== Grey Highlands ==
Mayoral Candidate	Vote	%
Paul McQueen (X)	2,130	58.86
Terry Mokriy	1,489	41.14

Deputy Mayor Candidate	Vote	%
Aakash Desai	1,831	51.26
Stewart Halliday (X)	1,741	48.74

== Hanover ==
Mayoral Candidate	Vote	%
Sue Paterson (X)	1,767	68.36
Mary Winkler	818	31.64

== Meaford ==
Mayoral Candidate	Vote	%
Barb Clumpus (X)	2,208	50.26
Jim McPherson	1,436	32.69
Ray McHugh	749	17.05

== Owen Sound ==
Mayoral Candidate	Vote	%
Ian Boddy (X)	5,943	90.40
Nancy-Lee Rosamond	352	5.35
Ray Botten	279	4.24

== Southgate ==
Mayoral Candidate	Vote	%
John Woodbury	1,423	79.59
Mike Scarr	365	20.41

== West Grey ==
Mayoral Candidate	Vote	%
Christine Robinson	2,210	48.50
Kevin Eccles (X)	1,976	43.36
Enos Martin	371	8.14
