= 2018 Northumberland County municipal elections =

Local election in Ontario, Canada

Elections were held in Northumberland County, Ontario, on October 22, 2018, in conjunction with municipal elections across the province.

== Northumberland County Council ==
The Northumberland County Council consists of the seven mayors of its constituent municipalities.

Position	Elected
Mayor of Alnwick/Haldimand	John Logel (acclaimed)
Mayor of Brighton	Brian Ostrander
Mayor of Cobourg	John Henderson (acclaimed)
Mayor of Cramahe	Mandy Martin
Mayor of Hamilton	Bill Crane (acclaimed)
Mayor of Port Hope	Bob Sanderson
Mayor of Trent Hills	Bob Crate

== Alnwick/Haldimand ==
Mayoral Candidate	Vote	%
John Logel (X)	Acclaimed	

== Brighton ==
Mayoral Candidate	Vote	%
Brian Ostrander	2,690	51.27
Mark Walas (X)	2,557	48.73

== Cobourg ==
Mayoral Candidate	Vote	%
John Henderson	Acclaimed	

== Cramahe ==
Mayoral Candidate	Vote	%
Mandy Martin	1,289	54.87
Marc Coombs (X)	1,060	45.13

== Hamilton ==
Mayoral Candidate	Vote	%
Bill Crane	Acclaimed	

== Port Hope ==
Mayoral Candidate	Vote	%
Bob Sanderson (X)	3,593	62.74
Terry Hickey	2,134	37.26

== Trent Hills ==
Mayoral Candidate	Vote	%
Bob Crate (X)	2,735	63.02
Susan Fedorka	1,605	36.98
