= 2018 Wellington County municipal elections =

Local election in Ontario, Canada

Elections were held in Wellington County, Ontario on October 22, 2018 in conjunction with municipal elections across the province.

== Wellington County Council ==
The council consists of the seven mayors of the constituent municipalities plus nine councillors elected from county wards.

Position	Elected
Centre Wellington Mayor	Kelly Linton
Erin Mayor	Allan Alls
Guelph/Eramosa Mayor	Chris White
Mapleton Mayor	Gregg Davidson
Minto Mayor	George Bridge
Puslinch Mayor	James Seeley
Wellington North Mayor	Andy Lennox
Ward 1 (Minto)	David Anderson (acclaimed)
Ward 2 (Mapleton)	Earl Campbell (acclaimed)
Ward 3 (Wellington North, part)	Campbell Cork
Ward 4 (Wellington North, part and Centre Wellington, part)	Stephen O'Neill
Ward 5 (Centre Wellington, part)	Mary Lloyd (acclaimed)
Ward 6 (Centre Wellington, part)	Diane Ballantyne
Ward 7 (Puslinch, and Guelph/Eramosa, part)	Don McKay (acclaimed)
Ward 8 (Guelph/Eramosa, part)	Doug Breen (acclaimed)
Ward 9 (Erin)	Jeff Duncan

== Centre Wellington ==
Mayoral Candidate	Vote	%
Kelly Linton (X)	5,242	61.86
Fred Morris	3,232	38.14

== Erin ==
Mayoral Candidate	Vote	%
Allan Alls (X)	1,465	46.54
Michael Dehn	1,255	39.87
Paul Dermott	428	13.60

== Guelph/Eramosa ==
Mayoral Candidate	Vote	%
Chris White (X)	2,893	71.75
David Wolk	1,139	28.25

== Mapleton ==
Mayoral Candidate	Vote	%
Gregg Davidson	1,245	60.85
Neil Driscoll (X)	801	39.15

== Minto ==
Mayoral Candidate	Vote	%
George Bridge (X)	1,722	53.61
Terry Fisk	1,490	46.39

== Puslinch ==
Mayoral Candidate	Vote	%
James Seeley	1,081	50.82
Dennis Lever (X)	1,046	49.18

== Wellington North ==
Mayoral Candidate	Vote	%
Andy Lennox (X)	2,438	70.93
Raymond Tout	999	20.07

== See also ==
- 2014 Wellington County municipal elections
- 2010 Wellington County municipal elections
