= 2018 Stormont, Dundas and Glengarry United Counties municipal elections =

Elections were held in Stormont, Dundas and Glengarry United Counties, Ontario on October 22, 2018 in conjunction with municipal elections across the province.

== Stormont, Dundas and Glengarry United Counties Council ==
Council consists of the mayors and deputy mayors of each of the townships. It does not include the city of Cornwall.

Position	Elected
North Dundas Mayor	Tony Fraser
North Dundas Deputy Mayor	Allan Armstrong
North Glengarry Mayor	Jamie MacDonald (acclaimed)
North Glengarry Deputy Mayor	Carma Williams
North Stormont Mayor	Jim Wert (acclaimed)
North Stormont Deputy Mayor	François Landry (acclaimed)
South Dundas Mayor	Steven Byvelds
South Dundas Deputy Mayor	Kirsten Gardner
South Glengarry Mayor	Frank Prevost (acclaimed)
South Glengarry Deputy Mayor	Lyle Warden
South Stormont Mayor	Bryan McGillis
South Stormont Deputy Mayor	David Smith

== North Dundas ==
Mayoral Candidate	Vote	%
Tony Fraser	2,436	60.63
Gerry Boyce	1,582	39.37

== North Glengarry ==
Mayoral Candidate	Vote	%
Jamie MacDonald	Acclaimed	

== North Stormont ==
Mayoral Candidate	Vote	%
Jim Wert	Acclaimed	

== South Dundas ==
Mayoral Candidate	Vote	%
Steven Byvelds	2,373	57.44
Evonne Delegarde (X)	1,758	42.56

== South Glengarry ==
Mayoral Candidate	Vote	%
Frank Prevost	Acclaimed	

== South Stormont ==
Mayoral Candidate	Vote	%
Bryan McGillis	2,311	45.82
Tammy Hart	2,097	41.57
Christopher Bonneville	636	12.61
