= 2018 Manitoulin District municipal elections =

Elections were held in the organized municipalities in the Manitoulin District of Ontario on October 22, 2018 in conjunction with municipal elections across the province.

== Assiginack ==
Reeve Candidate	Vote	%
David Ham	329	40.67
Michael Phillips	176	21.76
Paul Moffatt (X)	143	17.68
Brenda Reid	112	13.84
Rodney Deforge	49	6.06

== Billings ==
Mayoral Candidate	Vote	%
Joseph Ian Anderson	399	49.57
Margaret Tuomi	203	25.22
Barbara Erskine	203	25.22

== Burpee and Mills ==
Reeve Candidate	Vote	%
Ken Noland (X)	Acclaimed	

== Central Manitoulin ==
Mayoral Candidate	Vote	%
Richard Stephens (X)	Acclaimed	

== Cockburn Island ==
Reeve Candidate	Vote	%
Brenda Jones (X)	Acclaimed	

== Gordon/Barrie Island ==
Reeve Candidate	Vote	%
Lee Hayden (X)	Acclaimed	

== Gore Bay ==
Mayoral Candidate	Vote	%
Dan Osborne	Acclaimed	

== Northeastern Manitoulin and the Islands ==
Mayoral Candidate	Vote	%
Al MacNevin (X)	1,033	72.54
Melissa Peters	391	27.46

== Tehkummah ==
Reeve Candidate	Vote	%
David Jaggard	393	80.20
Ron Hierons	97	19.80
