= 2018 Ontario municipal elections =

Elections in Ontario, Canada

- October 22, 2018
- Turnout: 38.29% (▼4.83%)

The 2018 municipal elections in Ontario were held on October 22, 2018.

Voters in the province of Ontario elected mayors, councillors, school board trustees and all other elected officials in all of the province's municipalities.

== Electoral period ==
As per the Ontario Municipal Elections Act, 1996, nomination papers for candidates for municipal and school board elections could be filed from May 1, 2018, at which time the campaign period began.

Nominations closed on July 27, 2018, at 2 PM local time. Certification of nomination papers was completed by 4 PM on July 30, 2018.

Voting was on October 22 from 10 AM to 8 PM.

== Ranked ballots ==
In 2016, the provincial government passed Bill 181, the Municipal Elections Modernization Act, which permitted municipalities to adopt ranked ballots for municipal elections.

London was the only municipality to use ranked ballots in the 2018 election itself, with the decision in that city being made by London City Council in 2017, while Kingston and Cambridge held referendums concurrently with their 2018 elections on whether to adopt ranked ballots for the next municipal elections in 2022. Both of the referendums passed, though neither reached the 50 per cent turnout required to make the results legally binding.

In 2020, the provincial government passed Bill 218, the Supporting Ontario's Recovery Act, which, among other things, eliminated the option of ranked balloting for municipalities. The City of London will now have to switch back to first-past-the-post for its 2022 municipal elections.

== Online voting ==
The 2018 elections were also noted for a significant increase in the adoption of online voting. Across Ontario, over 150 municipalities conducted their elections primarily online, with physical polling stations either abandoned entirely or limited to only a few central polling stations for voters who could not or did not want to vote online.

On election day, however, 51 of those municipalities, all of which had selected Dominion Voting Systems as their online voting contractor, were affected by a technical failure. According to Dominion the company's colocation centre provider imposed a bandwidth cap, without authorization from or consultation with Dominion, due to the massive increase in voting traffic in the early evening, thus making it impossible for many voters to get through to the server between 5:00 and 7:30 p.m. All of the affected municipalities extended voting for at least a few hours to compensate for the outage; several, including Pembroke, Waterloo, Prince Edward County and Greater Sudbury, opted to extend voting for a full 24 hours into the evening of October 23.

== Counties ==
- 2018 Bruce County municipal elections
- 2018 Dufferin County municipal elections
- 2018 Elgin County municipal elections
- 2018 Essex County municipal elections
- 2018 Frontenac County municipal elections
- 2018 Grey County municipal elections
- 2018 Haliburton County municipal elections
- 2018 Hastings County municipal elections
- 2018 Huron County municipal elections
- 2018 Lambton County municipal elections
- 2018 Lanark County municipal elections
- 2018 Leeds and Grenville United Counties municipal elections
- 2018 Lennox and Addington County municipal elections
- 2018 Middlesex County municipal elections
- 2018 Northumberland County municipal elections
- 2018 Perth County municipal elections
- 2018 Peterborough County municipal elections
- 2018 Prescott and Russell United Counties municipal elections
- 2018 Renfrew County municipal elections
- 2018 Simcoe County municipal elections
- 2018 Stormont, Dundas and Glengarry United Counties municipal elections
- 2018 Wellington County municipal elections

== Regional municipalities ==
- 2018 Durham Region municipal elections
- 2018 Halton Region municipal elections
- 2018 Muskoka District municipal elections
- 2018 Niagara Region municipal elections
- 2018 Oxford County municipal elections
- 2018 Peel Region municipal elections
- 2018 Waterloo Region municipal elections
- 2018 York Region municipal elections

== Districts ==
- 2018 Algoma District municipal elections
- 2018 Cochrane District municipal elections
- 2018 Kenora District municipal elections
- 2018 Manitoulin District municipal elections
- 2018 Nipissing District municipal elections
- 2018 Parry Sound District municipal elections
- 2018 Rainy River District municipal elections
- 2018 Sudbury District municipal elections
- 2018 Thunder Bay District municipal elections
- 2018 Timiskaming District municipal elections

== Single tier municipalities ==
Where indicated in the below tables, "(X)" indicates that the candidate was the incumbent.

=== Chatham-Kent ===
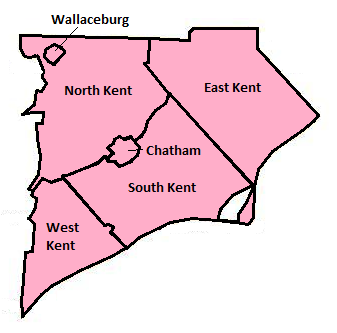
Map of Chatham-Kent's six wards

==== Mayor ====
Mayoral Candidate	Vote	%
Darrin Canniff	19,316	56.01
Alysson Storey	9,255	26.83
Randy Hope (X)	4,722	13.69
Harold Atkinson	675	1.96
Robert Salvatore Powers	351	1.02
Allan Robert Traylor	170	0.49

==== Chatham-Kent Municipal Council ====
The results for Chatham-Kent municipal council is as follows:

Ward 1 - West Kent 2 to be elected
Candidate	Vote	%
Mark Authier (X)	1,991	39.32
Melissa Harrigan	1,682	33.22
Bryon Fluker (X)	1,050	20.74
Mark Pastorius	252	4.98
Jordan Dell	88	1.74

Ward 2 - South Kent 3 to be elected
Candidate	Vote	%
Trevor Thompson (X)	3,723	25.26
Anthony Ceccacci	1,967	13.34
Mary Clare Latimer	1,910	12.96
Frank Vercouteren (X)	1,840	12.48
Art Stirling	1,541	10.45
Henry Svec	1,281	8.69
Tanya Bondy	1,276	8.66
Amy Ramsden Dalton	1,202	8.15

Ward 3 - East Kent 2 to be elected
Candidate	Vote	%
Steve Pinsonneault (X)	2,541	39.48
John Wright	2,023	31.43
MaryAnn Hawthorne	1,872	29.09

Ward 4 - North Kent 2 to be elected
Candidate	Vote	%
Joe Faas (X)	1,528	19.36
Jamie McGrail	1,506	19.08
Joey Cyples	1,418	17.97
Patricia Sylvain	1,324	16.77
Mary Anne Udvari	854	10.82
Steven Scott	605	7.67
Jessica Brooks	528	6.69
Dylan Robert McLay	130	1.65

Ward 5 - Wallaceburg 2 to be elected
Candidate	Vote	%
Carmen McGregor (X)	1,866	36.62
Aaron Hall	1,673	32.84
Randy McNeil	818	16.05
Nicolas Cadotte	738	14.48

Ward 6 - Chatham 6 to be elected
Candidate	Vote	%
Marjorie Crew	7,589	10.87
Michael Bondy (X)	7,552	10.82
Brock McGregor (X)	7,267	10.41
Doug Sulman (X)	6,565	9.40
Karen Kirkwood-Whyte	5,893	8.44
Amy Finn	5,753	8.24
Larry Vellinga	5,698	8.16
Don Fuoco	5,449	7.80
Sparky Leonard	4,576	6.55
Kirk Hooker	3,301	4.73
Penelope Duchesne	2,960	4.24
Chris June	2,687	3.85
Ryan Jackson	1,432	2.05
Gordon Thomas	1,127	1.61
Les Banks	740	1.06
James Thompson	668	0.96
Drew Simpson	564	0.81

=== Haldimand County ===
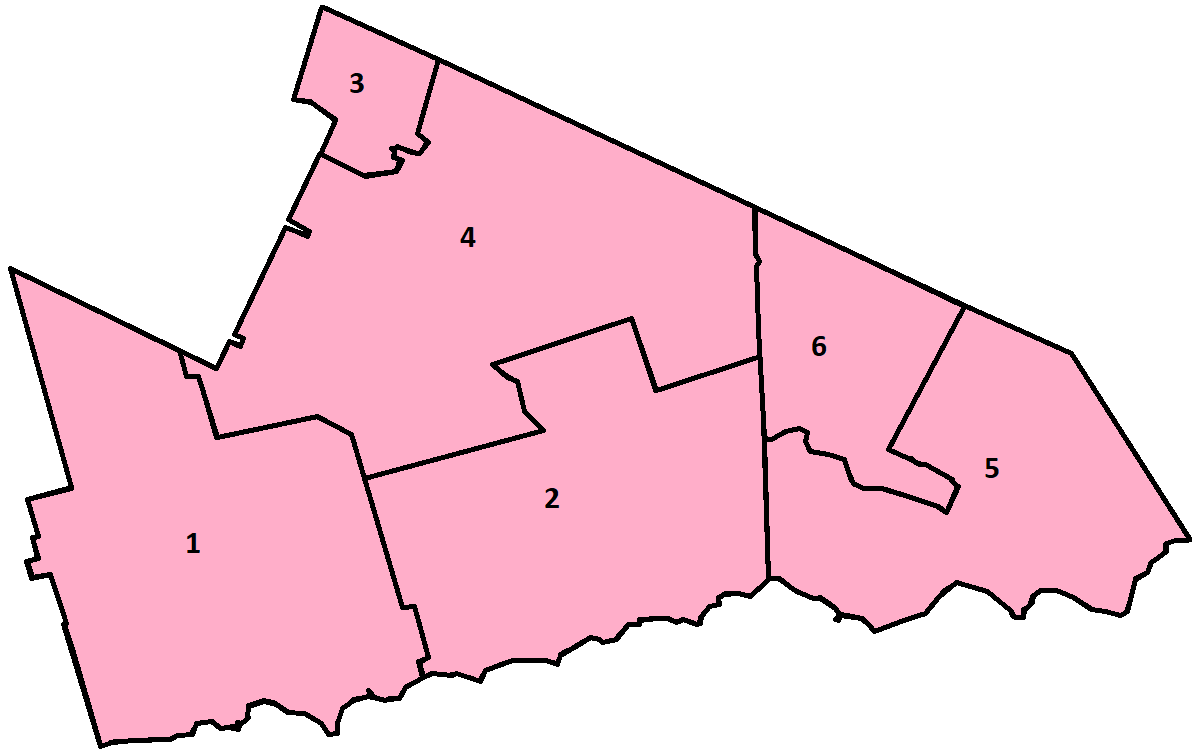
Map of Haldimand County's wards

==== Mayor ====
Mayoral Candidate	Vote	%
Ken Hewitt (X)	6,578	50.26
David McClung	3,840	29.34
Lisa Taylor	2,671	20.41

==== Haldimand County Municipal Council ====
The results for Haldimand County Council are as follows:

Ward 1
Candidate	Vote	%
Stewart Patterson	1,100	55.06
Leroy Bartlett (X)	800	40.04
Andrew Bergsma	98	4.90

Ward 2
Candidate	Vote	%
John Metcalfe	988	44.75
Ray Hunsinger	543	24.59
Fred Morison (X)	491	22.24
Donna Pitcher	186	8.42

Ward 3
Candidate	Vote	%
Dan Lawrence	1,267	39.89
Craig Grice (X)	1,160	36.52
Cheryl Beemer	749	22.58

Ward 4
Candidate	Vote	%
Tony Dalimonte (X)	1,470	67.77
Patrick Cook	699	32.23

Ward 5
Candidate	Vote	%
Rob Shirton (X)	855	57.38
Marianne Kidd	442	29.66
Joey Tingle	193	12.95

Ward 6
Candidate	Vote	%
Bernie Corbett (X)	1,668	77.55
Julie Marchese	483	22.45

=== Kawartha Lakes ===
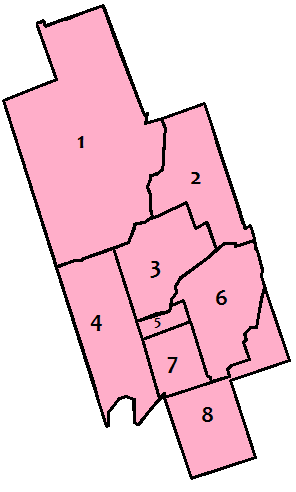
Map of Kawartha Lakes' eight new wards

==== Mayor ====
Mayoral Candidate	Vote	%
Andy Letham (X)	11,435	45.66
Gord James	9,878	39.44
Brian Junkin	2,724	10.88
Peter Weygang	1,007	4.02

==== Kawartha Lakes Municipal Council ====
For 2018, the Kawartha Lakes council will be reduced from 16 to 8 seats, plus the mayor.

The results for Kawartha Lakes council are as follows:

Ward 1
Candidate	Vote	%
Emmett Yeo (X)	1,213	47.25
Don Logan	680	26.49
Rob Macklem (X)	479	18.66
Raymonde Blais Couture	195	7.60

Ward 2
Candidate	Vote	%
Kathleen Seymour-Fagan (X)	1,112	35.29
Stephen Slack	883	26.44
Afe Helleman	615	19.52
John Snider	373	11.84
Jim Greensides	143	4.54
Leslie Mieszkowski	75	2.38

Ward 3
Candidate	Vote	%
Doug Elmslie (X)	2,047	63.20
Roger McInnis	810	25.01
Stephen Clarke	382	11.79

Ward 4
Candidate	Vote	%
Andrew Veale (X)	1,195	47.59
Ian Nicolson	763	30.39
John Pollard (X)	365	14.54
George Davidson	188	7.49

Ward 5
Candidate	Vote	%
Pat Dunn (X)	1,403	34.93
Duncan Gallacher	1,049	26.11
John Hagarty	919	22.88
Derrick Camphorst	646	16.08

Ward 6
Candidate	Vote	%
Ron Ashmore	666	20.58
Pat Warren	571	17.65
Gerard Jilesen (X)	527	16.29
Jeffery Farquhar	462	14.28
Emily Nigro	374	11.56
Mary Ann Martin (X)	347	10.72
Al Robb	289	8.93

Ward 7
Candidate	Vote	%
Patrick O'Reilly (X)	2,832	72.28
Charles Clarke	1,086	27.72

Ward 8
Candidate	Vote	%
Tracy Richardson	815	36.35
Heather Stauble (X)	670	29.88
Jack Morrison	314	14.01
David Watson	207	9.23
Wayne Hunt	183	8.16
Michelle Murphy-Ward	53	2.36

=== Norfolk County ===
The following are the results for Norfolk County.

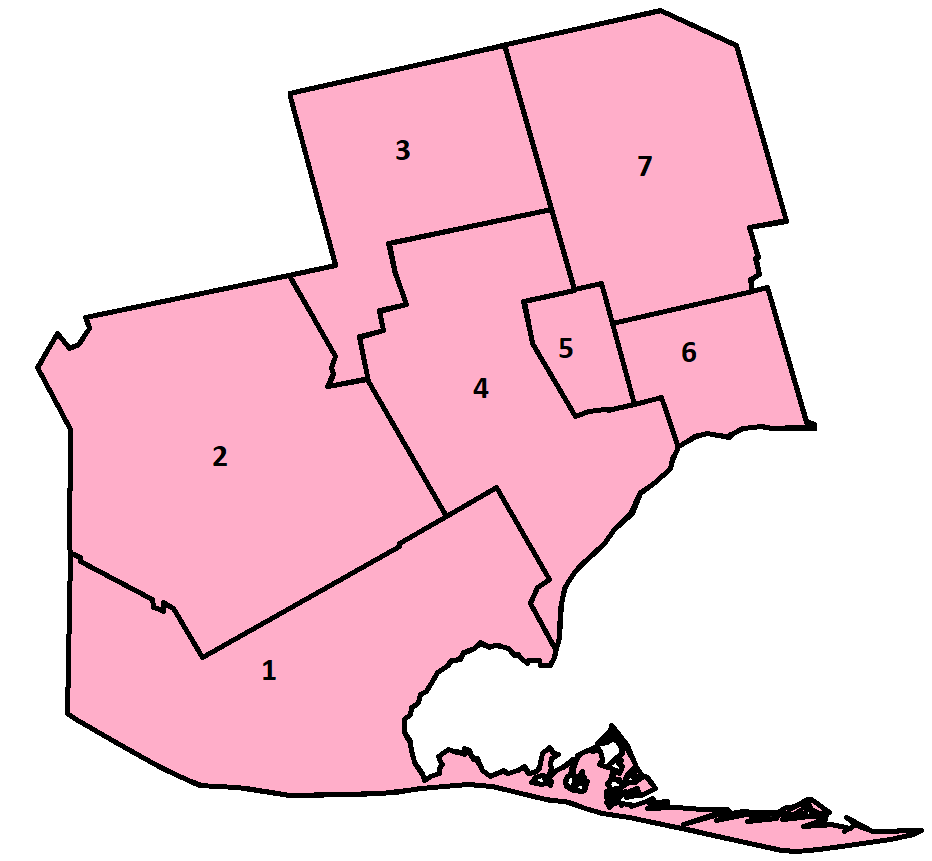
Map of Norfolk County's wards

==== Mayor ====
Mayoral Candidate	Vote	%
Kristal Chopp	10,838	53.95
Charlie Luke (X)	8,646	43.04
Russell Colebrook	604	3.01

==== Norfolk County Council ====
There were some slight alterations to Norfolk County's ward map.

Ward 1
Candidate	Vote	%
Tom Masschaele	547	25.94
John Henderson	523	24.80
Ted Mole	498	23.61
John Peazel	235	11.14
Doug McArthur	150	7.11
Daniel Wagner	117	5.55
Michael Toth	39	1.85

Ward 2
Candidate	Vote	%
Roger Geysens (X)	720	45.63
Matt Devos	582	36.88
Joe Murphy	276	17.49

Ward 3
Candidate	Vote	%
Michael Columbus	1,249	54.95
Darryl Smart	477	20.99
Leslie Berta	273	12.01
Albert Guiler	221	9.72
Tim Sullivan	53	2.33

Ward 4
Candidate	Vote	%
Chris Van Paassen	1,089	52.51
Dean Morrison	913	44.02
Thomas Ferris	72	3.47

Ward 5 2 to be elected
Candidate	Vote	%
Ian Rabbitts	3,007	33.10
Ryan Taylor	1,616	17.79
Doug Brunton (X)	1,542	16.97
Peter Black (X)	1,227	13.51
Doreen Oates	960	10.57
Rick Dixon	733	8.08

Ward 6
Candidate	Vote	%
Amy Martin	2,242	51.00
Adam Veri	912	20.75
John Wells (X)	323	7.35
Doug Long	282	6.41
Jeff Miller	233	5.30
Gary Muntz	230	5.23
Rick Misner	174	3.96

Ward 7
Candidate	Vote	%
Kim Huffman	1,197	50.87
Jean Montgomery	1,156	49.13

===== By-election =====
A by-election was held on June 3, 2021, in Ward 2 to fill the vacancy of Roger Geysens who retired.

Candidate	Vote	%
Linda Vandendriessche	1,025	56.57
Bill Dendekker	338	18.65
Noel Haydt	200	11.04
David Van Hamme	128	7.06
Pamela Moore	106	5.08
Russell Colebrook	10	0.55

=== Prince Edward County ===
==== Mayor ====
The following are the results for Prince Edward County.

Candidate	Vote	%
Steve Ferguson	4,981	50.17
Dianne O'Brien	4,043	40.72
Richard Whiten	904	9.11

== Separated municipalities ==
Where indicated in the below tables, "(X)" indicates that the candidate was the incumbent.

=== Belleville ===
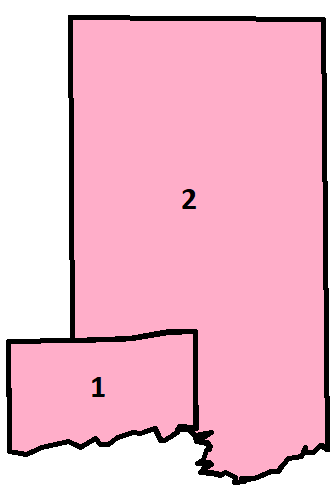
Map of Belleville's wards

The following are the results for Belleville.

==== Mayor ====
Mayoral Candidate	Vote	%
Mitch Panciuk	5,238	36.06
Taso Christopher (X)	3,688	25.39
Egerton Boyce	3,132	21.56
Jodie Jenkins	2,469	17.00

==== Councillors ====
Ward 1 - Belleville
Candidate	Vote	%
Ryan Williams	6,168	11.43
Garnet Thompson (X)	5,839	10.82
Pat Culhane	5,594	10.36
Chris Malette	5,498	10.19
Kelly McCaw (X)	4,905	9.09
Sean Kelly	4,713	8.73
Tyler Allsopp	3,891	7.21
Carol Feeney	2,998	5.55
Paul Martin	2,567	4.76
Brigitte Muir	2,228	4.13
Richard Black	1,744	3.23
Michael Graham	1,664	3.08
Danny Morrison	1,643	3.04
Jeremy Davis	1,490	2.76
Stanley Jones	1,407	2.61
Paul Bell	1,096	2.03
Curtis Hayes	527	0.98

Ward 2 - Thurlow
Candidate	Vote	%
Paul Carr (X)	1,979	33.18
Bill Sandison	1,201	20.14
Kathryn Brown	867	14.54
Lisa Warriner	805	13.50
Nicholas Mulhall	585	9.81
Barry Robinson	527	8.84

=== Brockville ===
The following are the results for Brockville.

==== Mayor ====
Mayoral Candidate	Vote	%
Jason Baker	3,033	38.87
Mark Oliver	3,014	38.63
Cec Drake	1,356	17.38
Kelly Cole	286	3.67

==== Councillors ====
Eight Councillors were elected.

Candidate	Vote	%
Matt Wren	4,432	8.83
Cameron Wales	4,119	8.21
Mike Kalivas (X)	4,054	8.08
Jane Fullarton (X)	3,806	7.59
Larry Journal	3,126	6.23
Jeffrey Earle (X)	3,043	6.07
Nathalie Lavergne	2,993	5.97
Leigh Bursey (X)	2,843	5.67
Joy Sterritt	2,830	5.64
Jessica Barabash	2,759	5.50
Philip Deery	2,533	5.05
Naomi McNeill	1,967	3.92
Bud Eyre	1,606	3.20
Tony Barnes	1,486	2.96
Mark Darrah	1,444	2.88
Willy Stevenson	1,436	2.86
John Henderson	1,386	2.76
Robert Shannon	1,360	2.71
Matthew Blair	1,059	2.11
Jeff Severson	1,014	2.02
Ralph Legere	823	1.64

=== Cornwall ===
==== Mayor ====
Mayoral Candidate	Vote	%
Bernadette Clement	6,688	53.86
David Murphy	3,042	24.50
Leslie O'Shaughnessy (X)	2,450	19.73
Nicole Spahich	238	1.92

==== Cornwall City Council ====
The results for Cornwall city council are as follows:

At-large 10 to be elected
Candidate	Vote	%
Justin Towndale (X)	5,323	6.78
Elaine MacDonald (X)	4,715	6.00
Carilyne Hébert (X)	4,485	5.71
Maurice Dupelle (X)	4,365	5.56
Claude McIntosh (X)	4,331	5.51
Eric Bergeron	3,999	5.09
Glen Garry Grant	3,673	4.68
Todd Bennett	3,652	4.65
Syd Gardiner	3,424	4.36
Dean Hollingsworth	3,361	4.28
Denis Carr (X)	3,356	4.27
Kelly Bergeron	3,224	4.11
Heather Megill	2,717	3.46
Claude Poirier	2,709	3.45
Alex de Wit	2,570	3.27
Gérald E. Samson	2,469	3.14
Carson Andrews	2,282	2.91
Mark A. MacDonald (X)	2,154	2.74
Kyle Bergeron	2,095	2.67
Patrick Dussault	1,906	2.43
Carol A. Boileau	1,893	2.41
Jack Lindsay	1,780	2.27
Keith Frost	1,604	2.04
Mary Jane Proulx	1,532	1.95
Ellen Crothers	1,148	1.46
John Rattray	1,056	1.34
Amani Aburamadan	646	0.82
Bernie M. Brunette	624	0.79
Ryan Acheson	540	0.69
William Douglas Beattie	489	0.61
James Brent Charles	422	0.54

=== Gananoque ===
==== Mayor ====
Mayoral Candidate	Vote	%
Ted Lojko	862	40.19
John S. Beddows	420	19.58
Jim Garrah	376	17.53
Brian Brooks	275	12.82
Christine Milks	212	9.88

=== Guelph ===
The following results are for Guelph.

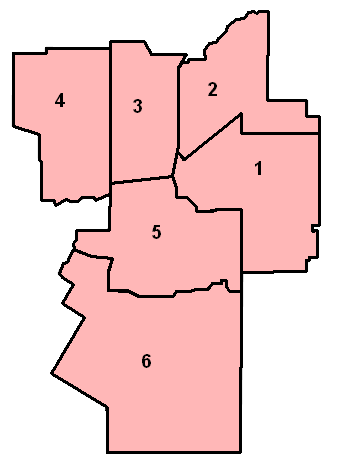
Map of Guelph's six wards

==== Mayor ====
Candidate	Vote	%
Cam Guthrie (X)	22,203	66.57
Aggie Mlynarz	11,149	33.43

==== Guelph City Council ====
Two councillors to be elected in each ward. Results for Guelph city council are as follows.

Ward 1
Candidate	Vote	%
Dan Gibson (X)	3,033	27.18
Bob Bell (X)	2,361	21.16
Barbara Mann	1,898	17.01
Charlene Downey	1,748	15.67
Jamie Killingsworth	1,057	9.47
Mark Gernon	737	6.61
Jax Thornton	172	1.54
Dave Heffernan	151	1.35

Ward 2
Candidate	Vote	%
James Gordon (X)	3,009	30.59
Rodrigo Goller	2,728	27.74
Jonathan Knowles	1,591	16.18
Dorothe Fair	1,341	13.63
Mary Thring	996	10.13
Sudha Sharma	170	1.73

Ward 3
Candidate	Vote	%
Phil Allt (X)	3,187	36.74
June Hofland (X)	2,764	31.86
Patrick Sheridan	1,319	15.20
Jason Dodge	1,054	12.15
Steven Petric	351	4.05

Ward 4
Candidate	Vote	%
Christine Billings (X)	2,330	26.63
Mike Salisbury (X)	1,702	19.45
Indu Arora	1,501	17.15
Peter Hamtak	945	10.80
Matt Saunders	877	10.02
Brendan Clark	702	8.02
Eli Ridder	694	7.93

Ward 5
Candidate	Vote	%
Leanne Piper (X)	3,719	41.29
Cathy Downer (X)	3,525	39.14
Alex Green	1,762	19.56

Ward 6
Candidate	Vote	%
Dominique O'Rourke	4,133	36.57
Mark MacKinnon (X)	3,137	27.75
Stacy Cooper	2,012	17.80
Anshu Khurana	870	7.70
Usha Arora	745	6.59
Lise Burcher	406	3.59

=== Kingston ===
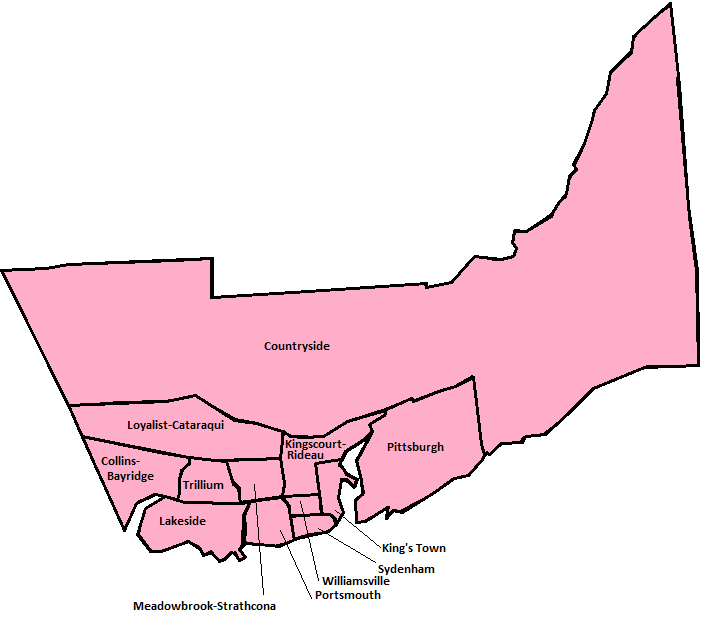
Map of Kingston's 12 districts

==== Referendum ====
Referendum on ranked ballots. The "yes" side won decidedly with 62%, but the turnout to make the referendum binding did not reach the 50% mark. However, Kingston City Council has promised to pursue the matter anyway.

Choice	Vote	%
Yes	20,642	62.00
No	12,161	37.00

==== Mayor ====
Mayoral Candidate	Vote	%
Bryan Paterson (X)	23,708	69.03
Vicki Shmolka	7,545	21.97
Rob Matheson	2,529	7.36
Eric Lee	564	1.64

==== Kingston City Council ====
The results for Kingston city council are as follows:

Countryside District 1
Candidate	Vote	%
Gary Oosterhof (X)	1,171	41.64
Louis Cyr	1,080	38.41
Jeff Scott	561	19.95

Loyalist-Cataraqui District 2
Candidate	Vote	%
Simon Chapelle	1,527	49.79
Bittu George	861	28.07
Stephanie Drapeau	385	12.55
Georgina Riel	294	9.59

Collins-Bayridge District 3
Candidate	Vote	%
Lisa Osanic (X)	2,322	67.91
Don Amos	1,097	32.09

Lakeside District 4
Candidate	Vote	%
Wayne Hill	1,958	52.01
Chris Morris	591	15.70
Ashley Johnson	529	14.05
Joran Morelli	503	13.36
Dave McKenna	126	3.35
Ed Smith	58	1.54

Portsmouth District 5
Candidate	Vote	%
Bridget Doherty	1,410	54.69
Chris Ball	584	22.65
David Dossett	424	16.45
Alexandra de Haas	96	3.72
Carly Francke	64	2.48

Trillium District 6
Candidate	Vote	%
Robert Kiley	1,508	42.49
Jimmy Hassan	1,249	35.19
Jim Hoover	436	12.29
Floyd Patterson	356	10.03

Kingscourt-Rideau District 7
Candidate	Vote	%
Mary Rita Holland (X)	1,007	45.20
Cheryl-anne Dorey Bennett	688	30.88
Darryl McIntosh	533	23.92

Meadowbrook-Strathcona District 8
Candidate	Vote	%
Jeff McLaren (X)	1,927	62.38
Taylor Pearce	1,162	37.62

Williamsville District 9
Candidate	Vote	%
Jim Neill (X)	932	50.98
Vincent Cinanni	742	40.59
Andre Imbeault	154	8.42

Sydenham District 10
Candidate	Vote	%
Peter Stroud (X)	1,141	64.57
Dylan Chenier	380	21.51
Steve France	171	9.68
Matt Gaiser	75	4.24

King's Town District 11
Candidate	Vote	%
Rob Hutchison (X)	2,001	80.43
Byron Emmons	487	19.57

Pittsburgh District 12
Candidate	Vote	%
Ryan Nelson Boehme (X)	Acclaimed	

=== Orillia ===
==== Mayor ====
Mayoral Candidate	Vote	%
Steve Clarke (X)	5,710	66.98
Gord Launchbury	2,815	33.02

=== Pelee ===
The results for Pelee Island were as follows:

==== Mayor ====
Mayoral Candidate	Vote	%
Raymond Durocher	Acclaimed	

=== Peterborough ===
The following are the results for Peterborough.

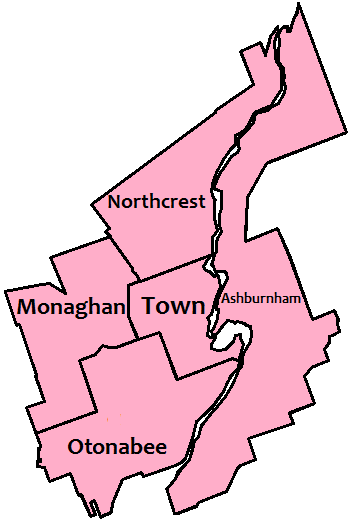
Map of Peterborough's five wards

==== Mayor ====
Mayoral Candidate	Vote	%
Diane Therrien	19,254	68.98
Daryl Bennett (X)	8,659	31.02

==== Councillors ====
Two councillors were elected from each of the 5 wards.

Ward 1 - Otonabee
Candidate	Vote	%
Kim Zippel	2,709	28.01
Lesley Parnell (X)	2,405	24.87
Bob Hall	2,045	21.15
Brock Grills	1,427	14.76
Ryan Waudby	895	9.26
Jason Wallwork	189	1.95

Ward 2 - Monaghan
Candidate	Vote	%
Don Vassiliadis (X)	3,066	27.39
Henry Clarke (X)	2,655	23.72
Jeff Westlake	2,439	21.79
Charmaine Magumbe	1,813	16.20
Dave McGowan	1,219	10.89

Ward 3 - Town
Candidate	Vote	%
Dean Pappas (X)	3,404	36.66
Kemi Akapo	2,718	29.27
Jim Russell	1,354	14.58
Jane Davidson	1,089	11.73
Jenny Lanciault	721	7.76

Ward 4 - Ashburnham
Candidate	Vote	%
Gary Baldwin (X)	3,095	30.82
Keith Riel (X)	2,833	28.21
Paul Rellinger	1,653	16.46
Sheila Wood	1,501	14.95
Ian Peddle	959	9.55

Ward 5 - Northcrest
Candidate	Vote	%
Andrew Beamer (X)	3,742	33.47
Stephen Wright	3,399	30.40
Dave Haacke (X)	2,548	22.79
Zach Hatton	1,492	13.34

=== Pembroke ===
==== Mayor ====
Mayoral Candidate	Vote	%
Michael LeMay (X)	2,893	67.40
Paul Kelly	1,399	32.60

=== Prescott ===
==== Mayor ====
Mayoral Candidate	Vote	%
Brett Todd (X)	Acclaimed	

=== Quinte West ===
==== Mayor ====
Mayoral Candidate	Vote	%
Jim Harrison (X)	7,019	67.17
Duncan Armstrong	3,429	32.82

==== Quinte West City Council ====
Elections results for Quinte West city council are as follows:

Ward 1 - Trenton 5 to be elected
Candidate	Vote	%
Michael Kotsovos (X)	2,318	15.81
Sally Freeman (X)	2,288	15.61
David Hugh O'Neil	2,090	14.26
Fred Kuypers (X)	1,957	13.35
Leslie Roseblade	1,600	10.91
Mark Kennedy	1,420	9.69
Andre deVries	1,262	8.61
Paul Bordonaro	676	4.61
Tyler Rickey	626	4.27
Stuart Gilboord	422	2.88

Ward 2 - Sidney 4 to be elected
Candidate	Vote	%
Karen Sharpe (X)	2,183	20.27
Allan DeWitt (X)	1,725	16.02
Terry R. F. Cassidy	1,555	14.44
Don Kuntze (X)	1,315	12.21
Garry Quinn (X)	1,229	11.41
Paul Kyte	1,225	11.37
Ernst Kuglin	1,046	9.71
Fred Keating	492	4.57

Ward 3 - Murray 2 to be elected
Candidate	Vote	%
David McCue (X)	Acclaimed	
Jim Alyea (X)	Acclaimed	

Ward 4 - Frankford
Candidate	Vote	%
Lynda Reid	400	53.05
Gregg Covell	178	23.61
Rob MacIntosh	176	23.34

=== St. Marys ===
Candidate	Vote	%
Al Strathdee (X)	Acclaimed	

=== Stratford ===
Mayoral Candidate	Vote	%
Dan Mathieson (X)	7,837	68.93
Tom Drake	2,174	19.12
Andrew Fraser	1,358	11.94

=== Smiths Falls ===
Mayoral Candidate	Vote	%
Shawn Pankow (X)	2,120	66.69
Joe Gallipeau	1,059	33.31

=== St. Thomas ===
==== Mayor ====
Mayoral Candidate	Vote	%
Joe Preston	3,731	36.55
Heather Jackson (X)	3,189	31.24
Stephen Wookey	2,949	28.89
Malichi Malé	338	3.31

==== St. Thomas City Council ====
The results for St. Thomas city council are as follows:

At-large 8 to be elected
Candidate	Vote	%
Steve Peters	8,197	13.58
Jeff Kohler (X)	5,888	9.76
Gary Clarke (X)	5,032	8.34
Lori Baldwin-Sands	5,019	8.32
Linda Stevenson (X)	4,080	6.76
Mark Tinlin (X)	3,939	6.53
Joan Rymal (X)	3,477	5.76
Jim Herbert	3,417	5.66
John Laverty	3,036	5.03
Rose Gibson	2,927	4.85
Lesley Buchanan	2,607	4.32
David Mathers	2,423	4.01
Serge Lavoie	2,296	3.80
Petrusia Hontar	1,995	3.31
Timothy Hedden	1,711	2.83
Greg Graham	1,496	2.48
Kevin Smith	1,190	1.97
James Murray	842	1.40
Michael Manary	785	1.30
