= 2018 Frontenac County municipal elections =

Local election in Ontario, Canada

Elections were held in Frontenac County, Ontario on October 22, 2018, in conjunction with municipal elections across the province.

== Frontenac County Council ==
Frontenac County Council consists of the mayors of each of the four constituent municipalities plus an additional councillor from each municipality.

Position	Elected
Central Frontenac Mayor	Frances L. Smith (acclaimed)
Central Frontenac Councillor	Selected from council
Frontenac Islands Mayor	Dennis Doyle (acclaimed)
Frontenac Islands Councillor	Selected from council
North Frontenac Mayor	Ron Higgins (acclaimed)
North Frontenac Councillor	Selected from council
South Frontenac Mayor	Ron Vandewal
South Frontenac Councillor	Selected from council

== Central Frontenac ==
Mayoral Candidate	Vote	%
Frances L. Smith (X)	Acclaimed	

== Frontenac Islands ==
Mayoral Candidate	Vote	%
Denis Doyle (X)	Acclaimed	

== North Frontenac ==
Mayoral Candidate	Vote	%
Ron Higgins (X)	Acclaimed	

== South Frontenac ==
Mayoral Candidate	Vote	%
Ron Vandewal (X)	3,237	48.49
Mark Schjerning	2,164	32.42
Phil Archambault	1,274	19.09
