= 2018 Kenora District municipal elections =

Elections were held in the organized municipalities in the Kenora District of Ontario on October 22, 2018, in conjunction with municipal elections across the province.

== Dryden ==
Mayoral Candidate	Vote	%
Greg Wilson (X)	1,599	54.87
Roger Valley	1,315	45.13

== Ear Falls ==
Mayoral Candidate	Vote	%
Kevin Kahoot (X)	284	62.14
Lynne Reynolds	173	37.86

== Ignace ==
Mayoral Candidate	Vote	%
Donald Cunningham	296	48.84
Chicki Pesola	110	18.15
Lee Kennard	105	17.33
Nelson Taddeo	95	15.68

== Kenora ==
Mayoral Candidate	Vote	%
Dan Reynard	4,729	92.29
Lydia Harlos	395	7.71

== Machin ==
Mayoral Candidate	Vote	%
Gordon Griffiths	186	52.39
Drew Myers (X)	169	47.61

== Pickle Lake ==
Mayoral Candidate	Vote	%
Dwight Monck	Acclaimed	

== Red Lake ==
Mayoral Candidate	Vote	%
Fred Mota	848	45.57
Dale Kosie	568	30.52
Gary Gazankas	225	12.09
Sandy Middleton (X)	220	11.82

== Sioux Lookout ==
Mayoral Candidate	Vote	%
Doug Lawrance (X)	717	40.83
Dennis Leney	565	32.18
Jason Bailey	474	26.99

== Sioux Narrows-Nestor Falls ==
Mayoral Candidate	Vote	%
Norbert Dufresne (X)	Acclaimed	
