= 2014 Wellington County municipal elections =

Local election in Ontario, Canada

Elections were held in Wellington County, Ontario on October 27, 2014 in conjunction with municipal elections across the province.

== Wellington County Council ==
The council consists of the seven mayors of the constituent municipalities plus nine councillors elected from county wards.

Position	Elected
Centre Wellington Mayor	Kelly Linton
Erin Mayor	Allan Alls
Guelph/Eramosa Mayor	Chris White
Mapleton Mayor	S. Neil Driscoll
Puslinch Mayor	Dennis Lever
Minto Mayor	George Bridge
Wellington North Mayor	Andy Lennox
Ward 1 (Minto)	David Anderson
Ward 2 (Mapleton)	Gregg Davidson
Ward 3 (Wellington North, part)	Gary Williamson (acclaimed)
Ward 4 (Wellington North, part and Centre Wellington, part)	Lynda White
Ward 5 (Centre Wellington, part)	Rob Black
Ward 6 (Centre Wellington, part)	Shawn Watters
Ward 7 (Puslinch, and Guelph Eramosa, part)	Don McKay
Ward 8 (Guelph Eramosa, part)	Doug Breen (acclaimed)
Ward 9 (Erin)	Pierre Brianceau

== Centre Wellington ==
Mayoral Candidate	Vote	%
Kelly Linton	5,598	63.06
Joanne Ross-Zuj (X)	3,279	36.94

== Erin ==
Mayoral Candidate	Vote	%
Allan Alls	2,403	60.27
Rod Finnie	1,120	28.09
David Lyver	464	11.64

== Guelph/Eramosa ==
Mayoral Candidate	Vote	%
Chris White (X)	2,361	68.55
John R. Scott	1,083	31.45

== Mapleton ==
Mayoral Candidate	Vote	%
S. Neil Driscoll	1,621	73.85
James C. Curry	574	26.15

== Minto ==
Mayoral Candidate	Vote	%
George Bridge (X)	1,976	58.57
Terry Fisk	1,398	41.43

== Puslinch ==
Mayoral Candidate	Vote	%
Dennis Lever (X)	1,301	57.04
Brad Whitcombe	980	42.96

== Wellington North ==
Mayoral Candidate	Vote	%
Andy Lennox	2,199	65.45
Raymond Tout (X)	1,161	34.55

== See also ==
- 2010 Wellington County municipal elections
