= 2010 Wellington County municipal elections =

Local election in Ontario, Canada

Elections were held in Wellington County, Ontario on October 25, 2010 in conjunction with municipal elections across the province.

== Wellington County Council ==
Position	Elected
Centre Wellington Mayor	Joanne Ross-Zuj
Erin Mayor	Lou Maieron
Guelph/Eramosa Mayor	Chris White
Mapleton Mayor	Bruce Whale
Puslinch Mayor	Dennis Lever
Minto Mayor	George Bridge
Wellington North Mayor	Raymond Tout
Ward 1	Mark MacKenzie
Ward 2	John Green
Ward 3	Gary Williamson
Ward 4	Lynda White
Ward 5	Jean Innes
Ward 6	Shawn Watters
Ward 7	Don McKay
Ward 8	Gordon Tosh
Ward 9	Ken Chapman

== Centre Wellington ==
Mayoral Candidate	Vote	%
Joanne Ross-Zuj (X)	5,505	
Robert Foster	2,962	

== Erin ==
Mayoral Candidate	Vote	%
Lou Maieron	1,701	
Rod Finnie (X)	1,579	

== Guelph/Eramosa ==
Mayoral Candidate	Vote	%
Chris White (X)	2,132	
Clinton G. Martin	546	

== Mapleton ==
Mayoral Candidate	Vote	%
Bruce Whale	1,273	
Richard Molenaar	854	
John Linde	195	

== Minto ==
Mayoral Candidate	Vote	%
George Bridge	1,954	
David Anderson (X)	1,394	

== Puslinch ==
Mayoral Candidate	Vote	%
Dennis Lever	1,345	
Richard Visser	566	
Brad Whitcombe (X)	441	

== Wellington North ==
Mayoral Candidate	Vote	%
Raymond Tout	1,312	
Mike Broomhead (X)	1,181	
Ross Chaulk	1,090	
Janice Lewis	157	
