= Charles Farr =

Charles Farr may refer to:

- Charles Farr (builder) (c. 1812–1888), Australian timber merchant and builder
- Charles Farr (civil servant) (1959–2019), British civil servant, intelligence officer, and diplomat
- Charles Cobbold Farr (1851-1914), Canadian Hudson's Bay Company Factor and the founder of Haileybury, Ontario.
