= The Temiskaming Speaker =

Canadian newspaper in Ontario

The Temiskaming Speaker is a local newspaper serving Temiskaming Shores, a city in the Timiskaming District in Northeastern Ontario, Canada.

== History ==
The Temiskaming Speaker was founded by E. F. and A. E. Stephenson, a father-and-son duo, as the New Liskeard Speaker in 1906. They published the newspaper weekly until 1938, when C. E. Bond purchased it. Then, it was placed under the Temiskaming Printing Company and renamed to The Temiskaming Speaker. The newspaper refused to give coverage to politicians and asked them to purchase it as an advertisement in the 1930s.

In 1962, the Haileyburian and Cobalt Weekly Post were merged with the Speaker. In the 1970s, A. J. Wright took ownership and appointed Don Curry the editor.

In 2003, The Temiskaming Printing Company and Cold North Wind Inc. created a digital archive for The Temiskaming Speaker.

=== The Haileyburian ===
The Haileyburian was founded on 23 September 1904 by C.C. Far, the founder of Haileybury, as the town's first newspaper. It was initially called the Haileyburian & Temiskaming Mining Journal. The offices of the newspaper were destroyed twice in town-wide fires in Haileybury, including the Great Fire of 1922. The Haileyburian restarted printing in April 1923 from a streetcar on Broadway Street in Haileybury. The copies of the newspaper are preserved in a digital archive.

== Popular culture ==
Novels by Mary Lawson mention The Temiskaming Speaker.
