= Conseil scolaire catholique de district des Grandes-Rivières =

School board in Ontario, Canada

Location
- Timmins, Ontario Timmins, Kirkland Lake, Iroquois Falls, Ramore, Earlton, Temiskaming Shores, Smooth Rock Falls, Moonbeam, Kapuskasing, Mattice, Hearst, Cochrane Canada
- Coordinates: 48.47717°N 81.36324°W

District information
- Director of education: Jérémie Lepage
- Schools: 32 elementary schools 11 high schools
- District ID: B29106

Students and staff
- Students: 5500+

Other information
- Website: www.cscdgr.education

Le Conseil scolaire catholique des Grandes-Rivières (CSCDGR) is a French Catholic school board situated in northern Ontario. The easternmost region of the school board starts in Haileybury. The board covers much of the northern corridor of Highway 11 reaching as far north as Hearst. In the central region of this board is the community of Timmins. The CSCDGR administers schools in an area of 25,000 square kilometres.

The name of the school board was recommended by a former trustee, Jos Matkos. It refers to the many great rivers which run through the area.

== Logo ==
The logo of the CSCDGR was created by Carmel Arsenault, a local teacher. It represents the different riches found in the region; mining, agriculture and forestry. The colours are also symbolic: green represents forestry as well as renewal and hope; blue represents water not only from the rivers, is a symbol of baptism and also represents the calm northeastern skies of the region; and yellow represents wheat and agriculture, as well as joy for life that is lived in the region.

== Elementary schools ==
- école catholique Nouveau-Regard, Cochrane
- école catholique Sts-Martyrs-Canadiens, Iroquois Falls
- école catholique Ste-Thérèse, Ramore
- école catholique Pavillon Notre-Dame, Hearst
- école catholique St-Louis, Hearst
- école catholique St-François-Xavier, Mattice
- école catholique Ste-Anne, Hearst
- école catholique André-Cary, Kapuskasing
- école catholique Jacques-Cartier, Kapuskasing
- école catholique St-Jules, Moonbeam
- école catholique Georges-Vanier, Smooth Rock Falls
- école catholique Assomption, Earlton
- école catholique Assomption, Kirkland Lake
- école catholique Ste-Croix, Haileybury
- école catholique St-Michel, New Liskeard
- école catholique Anicet-Morin, Timmins
- école catholique Don-Bosco, Timmins
- école catholique Sacré-Coeur, Timmins
- école catholique Jacques-Cartier, Timmins
- école catholique Louis-Rhéaume, Timmins
- école catholique St-Dominique, Timmins
- école catholique St-Gérard, Timmins
- école catholique St-Jude, Porcupine

== Secondary schools ==
- école catholique Nouveau-Regard, Cochrane
- école secondaire catholique l'Alliance, Iroquois Falls
- école secondaire catholique de Hearst, Hearst
- école secondaire catholique Cité des Jeunes, Kapuskasing
- école catholique Georges-Vanier, Smooth Rock Falls
- école secondaire catholique l'Envolée du Nord, Kirkland Lake
- école secondaire catholique Thériault, Timmins
- école secondaire catholique Sainte-Marie, New Liskeard
- centre d'éducation des Adultes, New Liskeard
- La Clef, Timmins
- Centre d'éducation permanente, Kapuskasing

== See also ==
- List of school districts in Ontario
- List of high schools in Ontario
