= My Mother =

My Mother may refer to:

- Ma Mère, a 2004 French-Austrian-Portuguese-Spanish film starring Isabelle Huppert

- My Mother, a novel by Georges Bataille that was the basis for the film

- Mia Madre, a 2015 French-Italian film starring Margherita Buy
- My Mother, a 1971 album by Smiley Bates
- My Mother (2026 film), an Indonesian drama film

== See also ==
- Meri Maa (disambiguation) (lit. 'My Mother')
