= Mugwump (folklore) =

Canadian lake monster

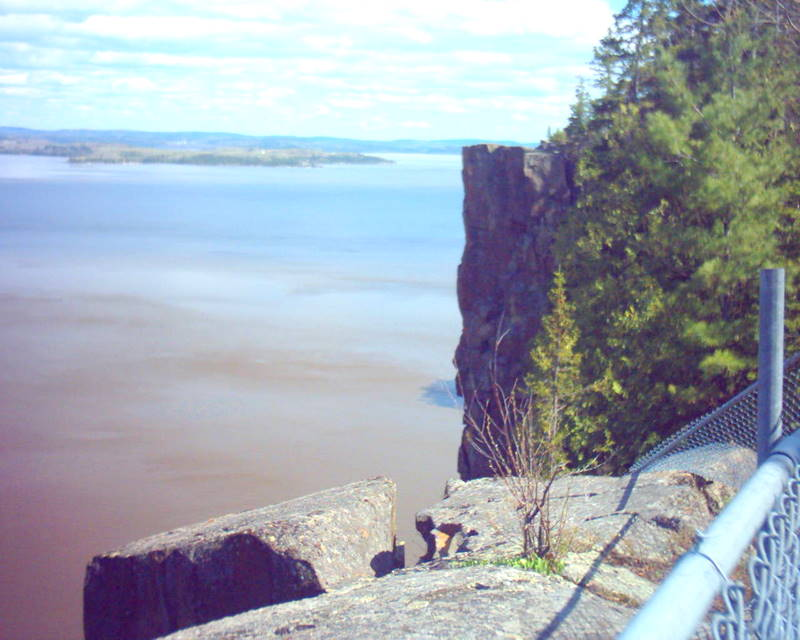
- Lake Timiskaming, as viewed from Devil's Rock Lookout

Creature information
- Other name(s): Old Tessie, Monster of Lake Temiscamingue
- Sub grouping: Lake monster

Origin
- Country: Canada
- Region: Lake Timiskaming, Ontario/Quebec
- Habitat: Water

The Mugwump (also: Old Tessie and Monster of Lake Temiscamingue) is a lake monster which has been alleged to live in Lake Timiskaming, on the border of the Canadian provinces of Ontario and Quebec.

== Terminology ==
The name "mugwump" comes from an Algonquin word, the exact meaning of which is unclear. In a 1979 communication on the creature, New Liskeard mayor Jack Dent reported that the name translated to "fearless sturgeon" in English. The word had already been used many years prior, when Puritan missionary John Eliot took it to mean "duke" or "centurion" in translating the Bible into Anishinàbemiwin in 1661. The Vermont American, a newspaper published in Middlebury, Vermont, indicated it meant "leader" in 1828.

In the 1880s the term became a political label for the "Mugwumps", Republican Party politicians in the United States who switched parties during the 1884 presidential election to support Grover Cleveland. Charles Anderson Dana, editor of the New York newspaper The Sun, popularised the term in this context, deriving it from the Algonquin word mugumquomp or mugquomp, meaning "important person" or "war leader".

Though Dana meant to make a sarcastic jab at the former Republicans who did not support their own candidate, the term was appropriated by the men it had originally been used to mock and became both popular and widespread, to the point that it is still used from time to time in the 21st century. The term also occurs in the 1959 William S. Burroughs novel Naked Lunch and in the 1962 Roald Dahl children's book Charlie and the Chocolate Factory, both times to describe fantastical creatures.

It remains unknown which elements of political and cultural history, if any, influenced the naming of the creature which Dent documented, referencing "a very old Indian legend", in 1979.

Another cryptid dubbed "Mugwump" allegedly resides in a marsh in Ventura, Iowa.

== Description ==
=== Anatomy ===
When interviewed in 1995, a witness recalled the Mugwump as having a round head and nose like an animal. Two ice fishers alleged to have seen a black, glistening head through their fishing hole in 1982; they noted that it had protruding eyes, one of which was trained on them and gave the impression it was sizing the men up. Another ice fisherman reported that he'd seen the creature completely out of the water one winter night, that it had a head similar to that of a dinosaur, and that it was long enough to curl around a number of fishing huts at once. A married couple which claimed to have witnessed the Mugwump swimming in 1978 reported that it had a humped back and no fins. Chuck Coull, the first human to have his encounter with the Mugwump documented and published, claimed the animal looked like a human-sized sturgeon. The creature is popularly depicted as having the body of a serpent and the head of a horse.

Jack Dent claimed in 1979 that a descendant of Chief Wabi (aka "Big Wabi") had informed him of the creature which lived in the lake. According to Dent's source:

... the mugwump was reputed to be the length of four Indian braves. Putting the average height of a brave at about five feet ... the mugwump was probably over 20 feet long.

Others have reported on the creature's size differently, with more conservative estimates putting it at the size of a human and a 1978 account putting it at a minimum length of 15 feet (4.6 m), and other stories suggesting its scales alone were the size of a saucer. Lake Timiskaming, which is a widening of the Ottawa River with an average depth of 36 metres (118 ft) and maximum depth of 220 metres (720 ft), has been described as a natural habitat for a creature of such a size by enthusiasts.

Other lake monsters in the region have been described as being similar to whales and large eels, often with a horse- or dog-like head and measuring between 15 metres (49 ft) and 30 metres (98 ft) long.

=== Behaviour ===
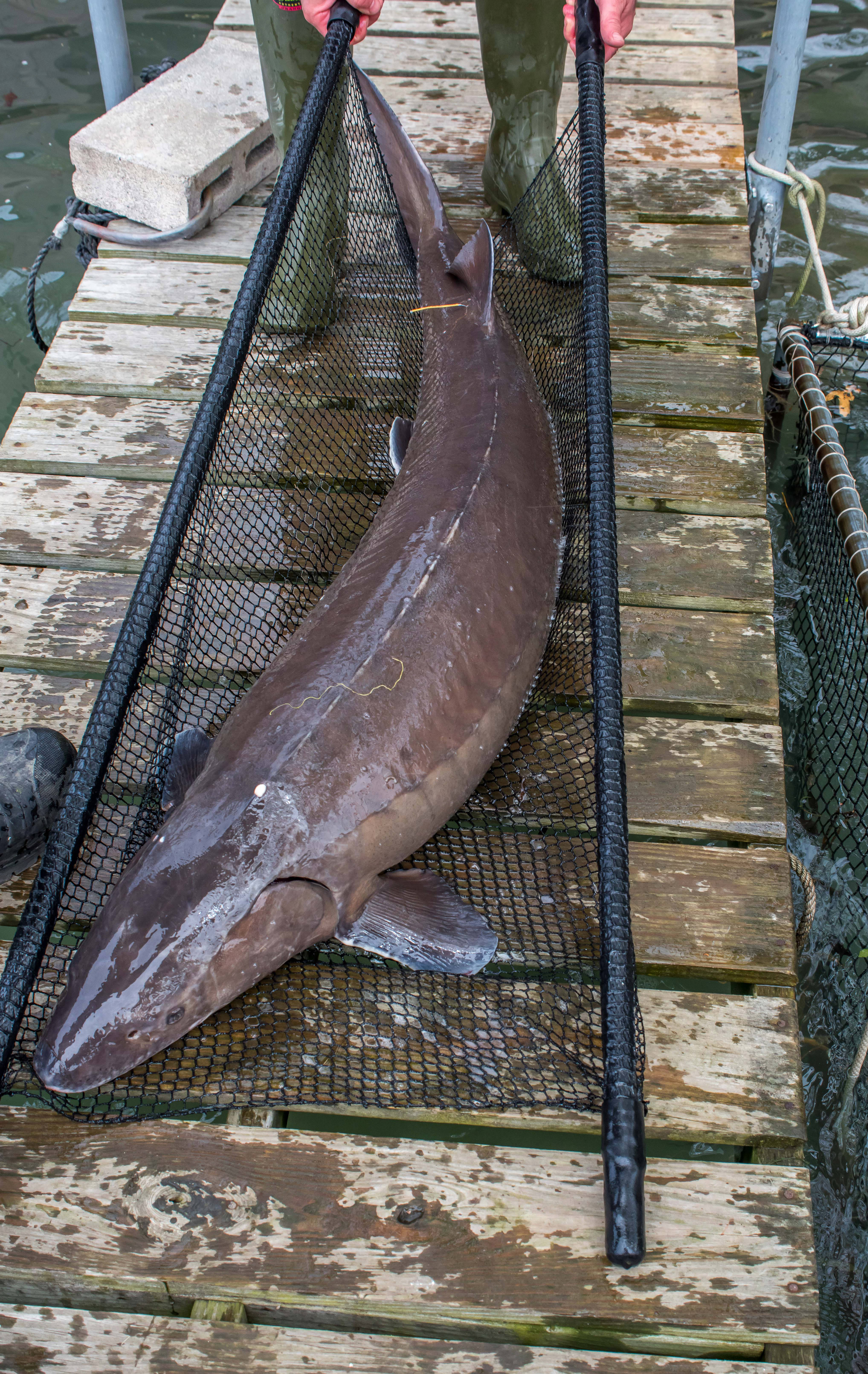
Lake sturgeon

On one occasion when the animal was spotted outside of water, a snake-like trail was allegedly found in the snow nearby. No other lake monsters in Ontario have been reported to move about on dry land, leading to conjecture that the animal sighted crawling on the land might represent a different animal than the Mugwump.

The exact population of the Mugwump is also disputed. Although often referred to as a singular creature, it was suggested in a 1982 interview with Kate Ardtree that there were multiple Mugwumps living in Lake Timiskaming. Regular sightings of the Mugwump in summer months gave rise to the idea that the creature spawns in July and August.

== Explanations ==
The most common explanation for the Mugwump is that it is a large sturgeon. While sturgeon are already large fish, the refraction of light through still or calm water can cause the size of objects to appear distorted, giving them the appearance of being much larger than in reality. As the creature is most often sighted during calm conditions and almost never seen outside of the water, it is possible that many Mugwump sightings are actually misidentifications of large fish. Other suggestions have included descendants of prehistoric animals such as the nautiloid Orthoceras, the plesiosaur Elasmosaurus, the whale Basilosaurus, and the early amphibian Ichthyostega; groups of otters swimming in single-file lines; logs floating just below the surface of the water, also known as "dead heads"; and waves created in the wakes of motorboats or during small earthquakes.

== History ==
The earliest reports of the creature for which there is documented evidence came in the 1970s, but reports of the Mugwump are said to go back much further. Chief Wabi, aka "Big Wabi", was a resident of Murray City (present-day Notre-Dame-du-Nord) on the Quebec side of Lake Timiskaming in the late-19th century and early-20th century. According to former Mayor of New Liskeard Jack Dent, a descendant of Chief Wabi recounted his nation's encounters with the Mugwump going back generations. In an 1879 canoe voyage along the Ottawa River and across Lake Timiskaming, the voyageur Sha-Ka-Nash described how his Anishinaabe guides made offerings of tobacco at sites like Devil's Rock to an otherworldy creature living in the lake:

So we put off and sailed down the big Lake Témiscamingue. When we came down to the big steep rocks on the west side the Indian crews had a great talk in their own language, and everyone who used tobacco, put a little in the water in front of the steep rocks, the writer adding his quota with the rest. I never learned the real significance of the performance, but anyone who passed on the lake with a loaded canoe in front of those rocks will know that such practice was very advisable to court the favor of the water sprite.

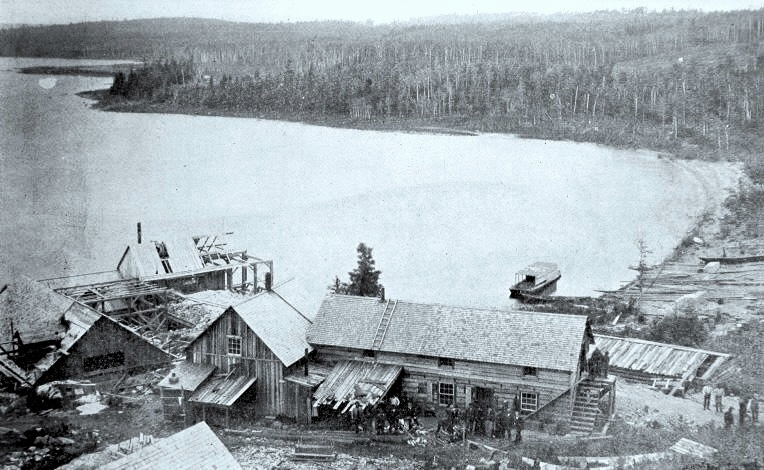
Lake Timiskaming in the early 20th century

European traders and settlers reported in the 19th century that when out on the lake in canoes they would regularly hear unexplained noises coming from the underside of their boats, explained as being fish following the shadows of the canoes from one end of the lake to the other, keeping tabs on them for the supernatural creatures which also resided there. One account suggests that locals collected saucer-sized objects from the lake in the 1920s and 30s which were believed to be the Mugwump's scales. Reports of other cryptids, such as Bigfoot, also began to emerge in the region around this time.

The first written documentation concerning the creature is from Jack Dent, reporting on the assertions made by his unidentified source in the North Bay Nugget on 20 April 1979. In the same article, Dent claimed that he had first been made aware of the creature ten years earlier in the late-1960s, and that the presence of such an animal in the lake could provide a boost to the town's tourism industry. Weeks later, journalist Mike Pearson published an account of Chuck Coull's early-1960s encounter with the Mugwump across two articles in The Temiskaming Speaker, sparking a brief local obsession with the creature that would last several years.

Though no official scientific investigation was done on the Mugwump, local newspapers attempted to capitalize on interest in the Mugwump by featuring many news articles and columns centred around it. The publications, including The Temiskaming Speaker also engaged in tabloid journalism to sensationalize the mystery, the most blatant being the 1982 article 'Tessie the monster stirs scientific world' which featured three explanations for the creature presented by three fictional cryptozoologists. The journalist most central to reporting on the Mugwump was Ada Arney, who usually wrote about the creature under the pen name "Alice Peeper" but also used other aliases including "Dr. Pablo von McDonell" and "Mary Wollstonescraft Sheltey". Arney occasionally claimed to be in contact with an anonymous biologist, who offered suggestions that the Mugwump was a prehistoric animal. Arney briefly ran a column, 'Of monsters and things', in The Temiskaming Speaker as the media cycle began to move on and interest in the Mugwump died down. Running from 10 February to 31 March 1982, Arney signed off on her final column about the mysterious creature with the following:

So if you follow the path of the flowers to Devil's Rock, chances are you may well see the monster as she swims by, forever seeking for her beloved.

Even after the initial media interest waned, sightings of the Mugwump were reported regularly in the Baie-des-Pères on the eastern side of Lake Timiskaming in the 1980s, particularly in Ville-Marie, Quebec, and along Vieux-Fort Road in the summer months. Sightings of the monster have continued into the current day. A video capturing a possible sighting of the creature was uploaded to YouTube on 28 July 2015.

=== Timeline ===
Events
Sighting	Newspaper article

Dates	Events
1920s – 1930s	Locals collect saucer-sized objects, allegedly Mugwump scales
early 1940s	John Cobb, a tug boat operator, spots the creature while transporting logs across Lake Timiskaming at night and notes that it has a round head and nose
early 1960s	Chuck Coull and his father approach what they think to be a "deadhead", a person floating in the water near Burnt Island; once they're close, it flips over and swims away
1978	While watching Lake Timiskaming, Ernie Chartrand and his wife spot something rapidly approach the shore before suddenly turning around and returning to deeper waters
20 April 1979	First written documentation – New Liskeard mayor Jack Dent's article 'A monster called Mugwump' in the North Bay Nugget provides a description of a creature said to be living in Lake Timiskaming and names it 'Mugwump'
2 May 1979	Mike Pearson publishes his first article on Chuck Couell's encounter with the Mugwump near Burnt Island in The Temiskaming Speaker
9 May 1979	Mike Pearson publishes a second article on Chuck Couell's encounter with the Mugwump near Burnt Island in The Temiskaming Speaker
1980s	Mugwump sightings become regular in summer months in the Baie-des-Pères
2 February 1982	The Temiskaming Speaker publishes an article written by reporter Ada Arney under the pseudonym "Alice Peeper" on Kate Ardtree's second-hand experiences with the Mugwump
10 February 1982	Ada Arney, under her pseudonym "Alice Peeper", publishes the first 'Of monsters and things' column
17 February 1982	Ada Arney publishes two stories of ice fishermen encountering the Mugwump in The Temiskaming Speaker under the pseudonym "Alice Peeper", that of Roger Lapointe and Dan Arney who had observed the creature through their fishing hole; and of a man who saw the creature completely outside of the water
24 February 1982	The Temiskaming Speaker publishes 'Tessie the monster stirs scientific world' by Dr. Pablo von McDonell (a pseudonum of Ada Arney) and 'Temiskaming monster early amphibian?' by Alice Peeper (also a pseudonym of Ada Arney)
3 March 1982	Ada Arney, while writing in The Temiskaming Speaker under her pseudonym "Alice Peeper", congratulates herself for working to advocate for the Mugwump's rights in Haileybury
31 March 1982	Ada Arney, under her pseudonym "Alice Peeper", publishes the last 'Of monsters and things' column
9 August 1995	Dariene Wroe reports on John Cobb's 1940s encounter with the Mugwump in a Temiskaming Speaker article
28 July 2015	A video which alleges to show the creature swimming is posted to YouTube

== In popular culture ==
Author Joël Champetier uses the Mugwump as a central plot element in his 1994 horror novel La Mémoire du lac. In the book, the "monster of Lake Temiscamingue" is a creature imprisoned in Lake Timiskaming which can be released if a father sacrifices his three children in exchange for the monster's freedom, inspiring the novel's antagonist Bowman to murder his two sons and attempt to kill his illegitimate son, Eric, to complete the ritual. The novel features several Algonquin traditional stories invented by Champetier to serve the plot of his story, and according to these fictional myths the monster's true identity is Ungak, the child of Nuliajuk who migrated to the lake at a time when sea levels were higher.

In spring 2009, the band La Baie du Sauvage from Témiscamingue Regional County Municipality released their debut album Le monstre du lac (English: "The Lake Monster"). Musician Philippe B, who is also from the Abitibi-Témiscamingue region, also referenced the creature on his 2017 album La grande nuit vidéo with the song "Le monstre du lac Témiscamingue".

The Mugwump is the subject of the 2018 poem "Mugwump" by Richard Stevenson. Stevenson depicts the Mugwump as a 30-foot-long (9.1 m) white sturgeon that has grown bitter over being misidentified.

== See also ==
- Champ (folklore)
- Memphre
- Old Yellow Top
- List of lake monsters
