= Haileybury School of Mines =

Haileybury School of Mines was a college focusing on mining education. The school is located in Haileybury, Temiskaming Shores. It would later be absorbed by Northern College.

== History ==
In 1903, silver mining started in Cobalt. The first principal of Haileybury Public School, Asbury Wilson, proposed the idea of establishing a school focusing on mining education. The Haileybury School of Mines was established in 1912. It was opened with the financial backing of the mining industry. The school survived in the Great Fire of 1922. It did close briefly during World War Two. It reopened as the Provincial Institute of Mining. There were protests from the mining industry against its closure by the provincial government of Ontario. It was led by Ossie Walli and Jack Frey.

In 1970, Northern College took over the Haileybury School of Mines. It offers a Mining Engineering Technician diploma under Northern College. Stephen Harper led National Citizens Coalition backed Merc Lavigne, a teacher of the Haileybury School of Mines, sue Ontario Public Service Employees Union over union fees in 1997.

The school increased the number of courses after 2000s and offered programs to attract more first nation students.

== Legacy ==
The history of school is covered in the Haileybury School of Mines Humble Beginnings by Brian Dobbs. Brian Dobbs, who is also the president of the Haileybury School of Mines alumni association said "There's probably not a place in Canada even today — any mining camp — that there isn't somebody who came to Haileybury,".

== Alumni ==
- Gilbert LaBine
