= Helen Doan =

Canadian supercentenarian (1911–2024)

- Born: 18 September 1911; Temiskaming Shores, Ontario, Canada
- Died: 18 April 2024 (aged 112 years, 213 days); Toronto, Ontario, Canada
- Known for: Oldest living person in Canada (30 January - 18 April 2024)
- Spouse: Harold
- Children: 2

Helen McKinnon Doan (née Donaldson; 18 September 1911 – 18 April 2024) was a Canadian supercentenarian.

== Biography ==
Helen Doan spent her childhood in New Liskeard. Doan remembered collecting money for the soldiers during the First World War at a young age. She moved with her parents to Toronto in 1923, where she lived until her death. After graduating from high school, she trained as an accountant, a profession she worked in until her retirement in 1976. In 1987, she published a book Every Woman: Adapting to Mid-Life Change.

In 1935, she married Harold Doan, with whom she had a daughter and a son. She had five grandchildren, six great-grandchildren, and two great-great-grandchildren. She played softball well into old age. According to her own statement, one of her granddaughters taught her how to use an IPad at the age of 98. Following the death of Mabel Mah at the age of 113 on January 30, 2024, Doan became the oldest person living in Canada. Helen Doan died on April 18, 2024, at the age of 112 years and 213 days.

== See also ==
- List of Canadian supercentenarians
