= Temiskaming Shores =

- City (single-tier)
- City of Temiskaming Shores
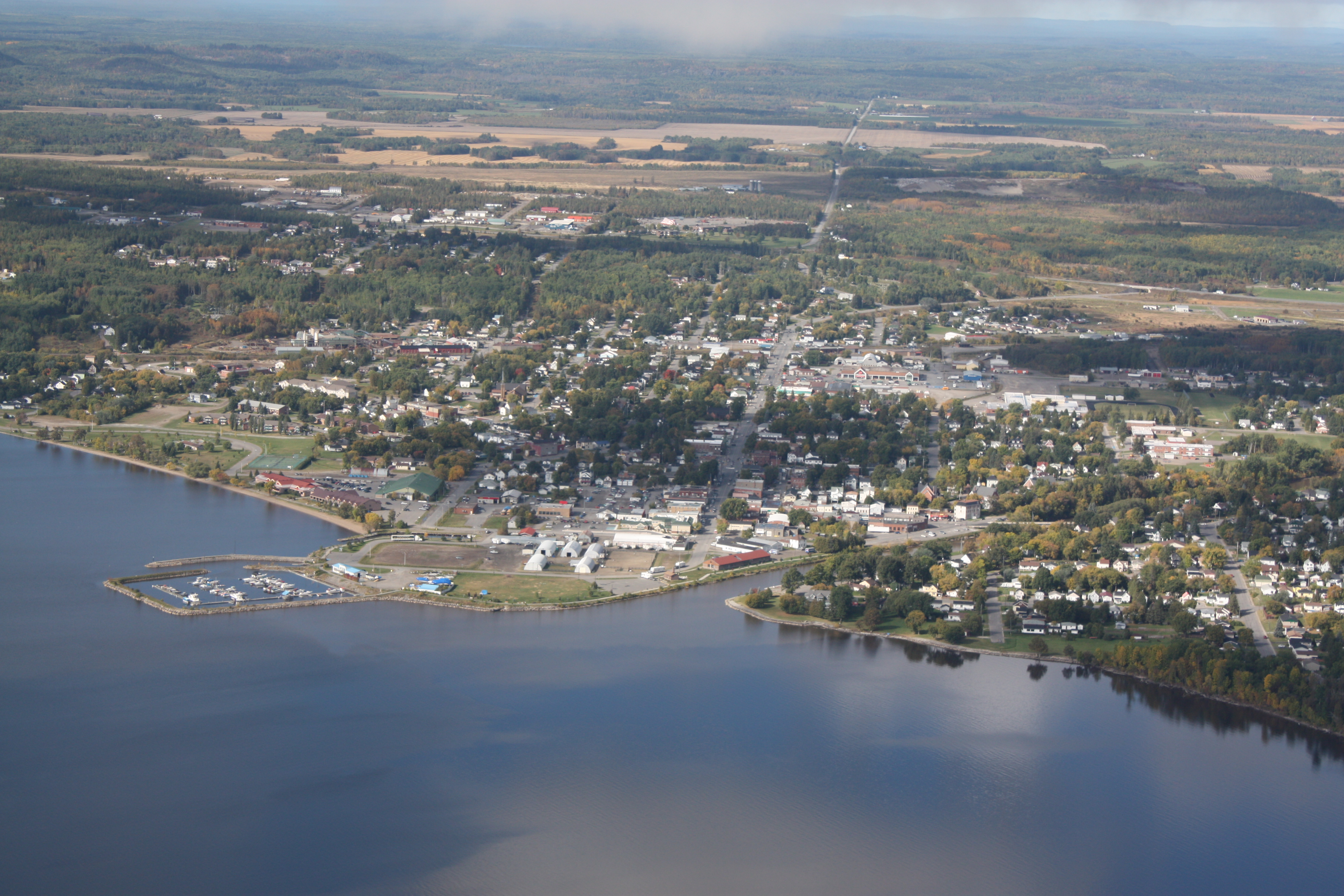

- Seal

- Location in Ontario
- Coordinates: 47°31′N 79°41′W
- Country: Canada
- Province: Ontario
- District: Timiskaming
- Established: January 1, 2004

Government
  - Mayor: Jeff Laferriere
  - Governing Body: Temiskaming Shores City Council
  - MPs: Pauline Rochefort (LPC)
  - MPPs: John Vanthof (NDP)

Area
  - Land: 176.67 km^{2} (68.21 sq mi)
- Elevation: 347.5 m (1,140 ft)

Population (2021)
  - Total: 9,634
  - Density: 54.5/km^{2} (141/sq mi)
- Time zone: UTC−5 (EST)
  - Summer (DST): UTC−4 (EDT)
- Postal code: P0J
- Area codes: 705, 249
- Website: www.temiskamingshores.ca

Temiskaming Shores is a city in the Timiskaming District in Northeastern Ontario, Canada. It was created by the amalgamation of the town of New Liskeard, the town of Haileybury, and the township of Dymond in 2004. The city had a total population of 9,634 in the 2021 Canadian census. Temiskaming Shores is Ontario's second-smallest city, in terms of population, after Dryden. Haileybury is the seat of Timiskaming District.

The constituent communities, alongside the neighbouring town of Cobalt, have been collectively referred to as "Tri-Towns" since before amalgamation. Cobalt was also part of the original Temiskaming Shores amalgamation plan, but rejected the merger.

In the Canada 2001 Census, the last Canadian census before the amalgamated city came into effect, New Liskeard had a population of 4,906, Haileybury had a population of 4,543, and Dymond had a population of 1,181.

== Geography ==
Temiskaming Shores is located along the southern edge of the Clay Belt area, near the Quebec border on the shores of Lake Timiskaming's Wabi Bay. The separate township municipality of Harris separates the city from the Ontario-Quebec border. The nearest town on the Quebec side of the border is Notre-Dame-du-Nord.

The city is located within the Timiskaming Graben, a smaller branch of the Ottawa-Bonnechere Graben. A large escarpment, known as Devil's Rock, is located near Haileybury.

=== Communities ===
The city includes the communities of New Liskeard, Haileybury, Dymond, and North Cobalt.

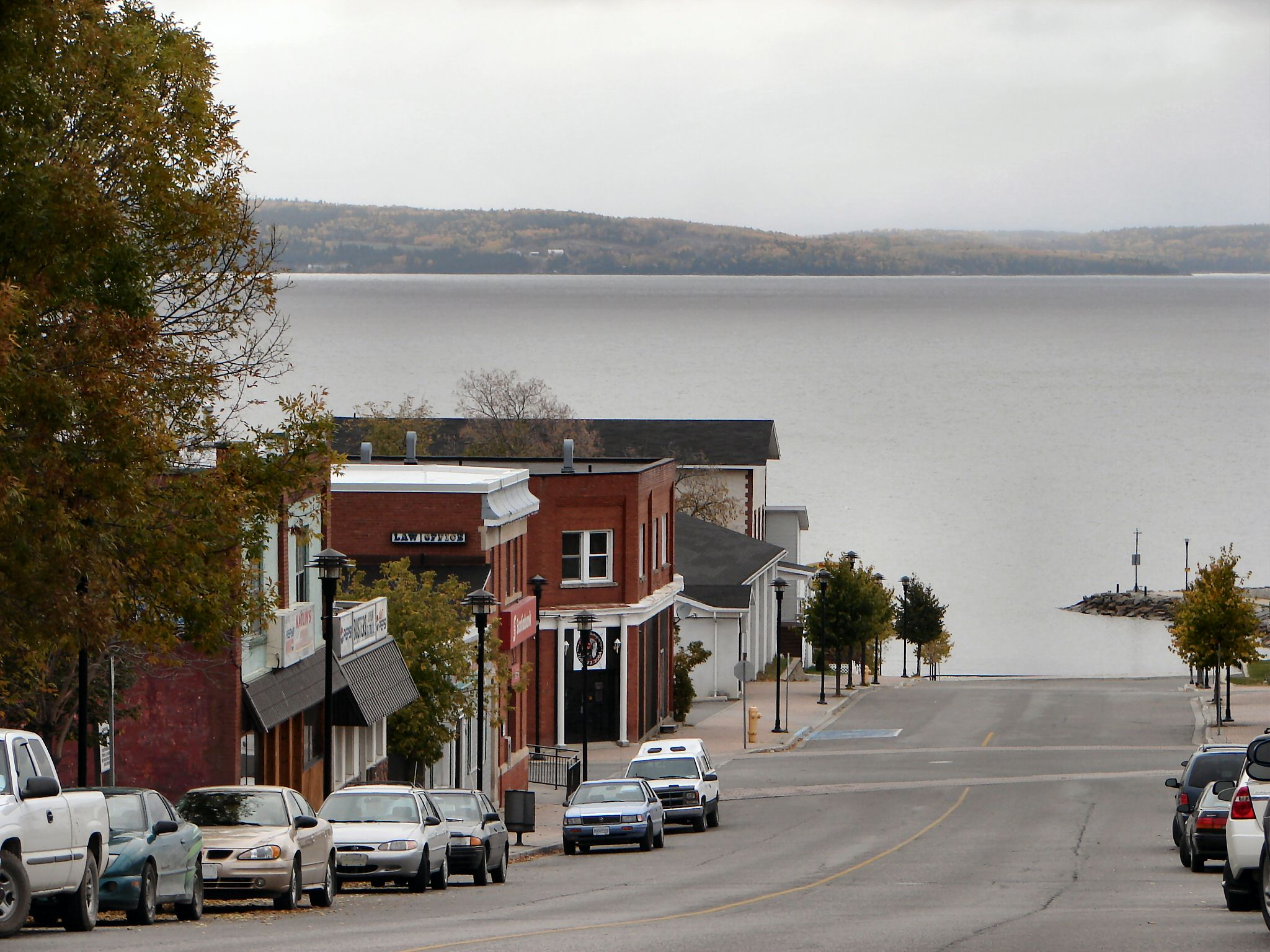
Haileybury

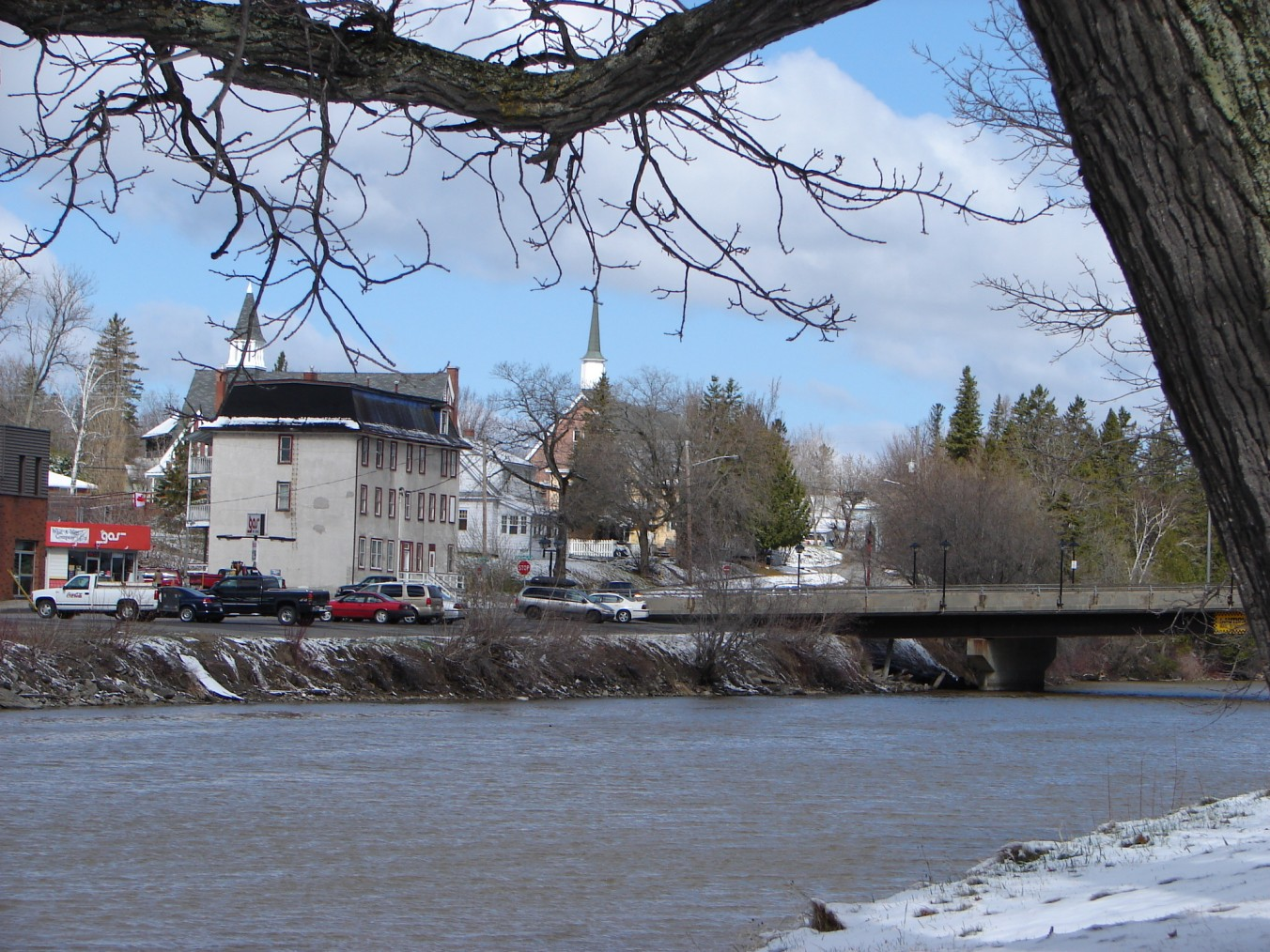
New Liskeard

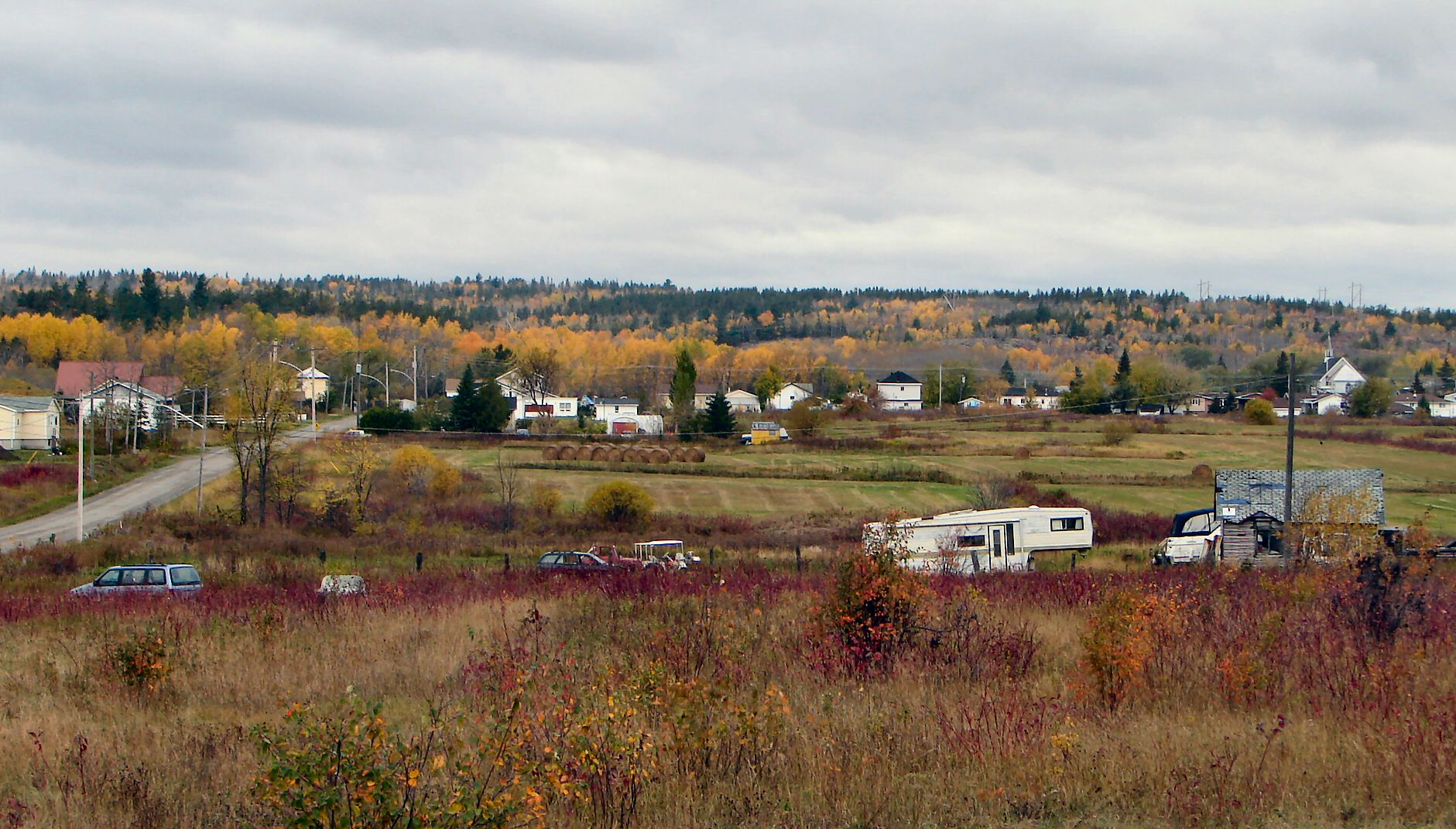
North Cobalt

== History ==
The Ottawa River, which drains into and out of Lake Timiskaming, has been a well-travelled route from the earliest times, including by Native peoples. It also served as the initial point of access to the Temiskaming area. Fort Temiscamingue was established in 1695 by French explorers. In 1794 George Gladman of the Hudson's Bay Company established Abitibi House on Lake Abitibi, to the north. In 1886, Alexander H. Telfer led a survey trip up Lake Timiskaming and gave a report to the Temiskaming Settlers' Association. By this time, the Quebec side of Lake Timiskaming was also being settled, and steamboats, the primary mode of transportation in the area, were ferrying new settlers into the area.

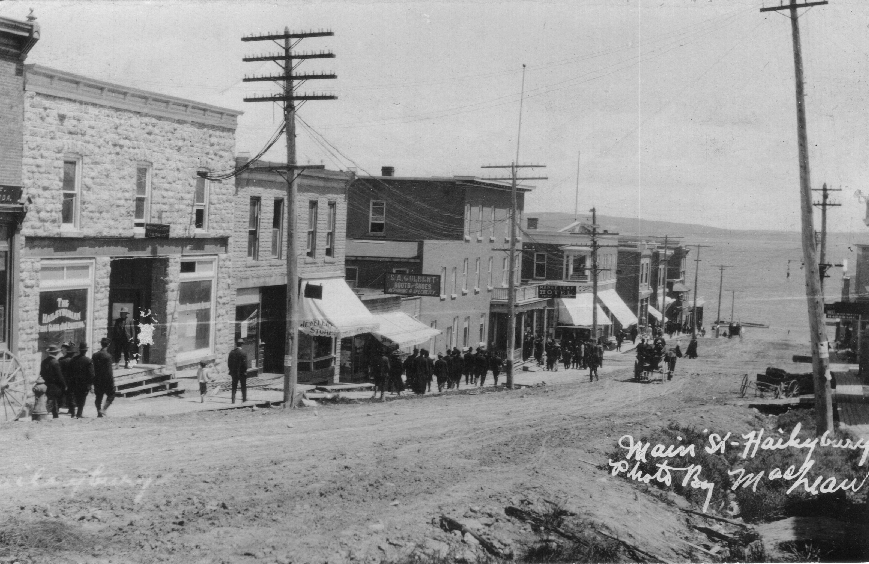
Haileybury, 1915

Before more settlements could be established, the Quebec-Ontario boundary north of Lake Timiskaming had to be accurately surveyed. Earlier surveys by Quebec and Ontario resulted in a boundary dispute, so the Canadian government sent a survey team to resolve the issue in 1890. William Ogilvie, who had recently distinguished himself by accurately surveying the Canada – Alaska boundary, led the expedition. A benchmark near Mattawa was used to establish an accurate benchmark north of Lake Timiskaming, using astronomical methods. From the head of Lake Timiskaming, they proceeded north to James Bay, fixing accurate positions of the provincial boundary at regular intervals using geodesy data derived from star transits. Ogilvie's journal describe conditions in this area and the early settlers he met. His report on this expedition describes the details of this expedition.

William Murray (1840–1906) and Irvin Heard (1871–1956) were the first European settlers in the New Liskeard area, arriving in 1891. Some years later Crown Lands Agent John Armstrong was dispatched to the area to oversee formal land settlement. The settlers founded a prosperous agricultural centre, taking advantage of the rich soil in the Little Claybelt region. New Liskeard was founded soon after settlers began to arrive in Dymond, and the two towns were soon incorporated, in 1903 and 1901, respectively. John Armstrong served as New Liskeard's first mayor. His descendants still live in the area today. New Liskeard was named after Liskeard in Cornwall, England.

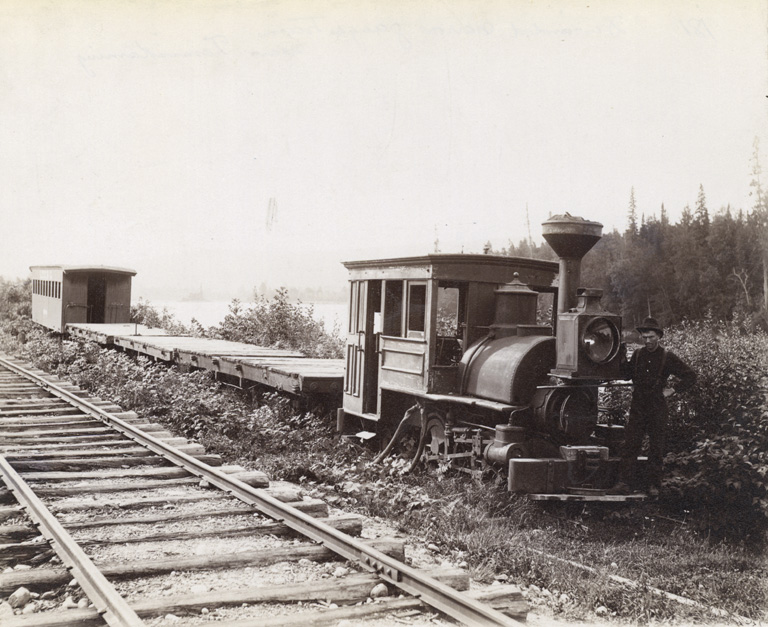
Old narrow gauge train at Haileybury, 1889

Haileybury was founded in 1889 by Charles Cobbold Farr, who named the newly founded town after the Haileybury and Imperial Service College, his former school in England. In 1901, Dymond Township was incorporated, and two years later in 1903, the Town of New Liskeard was established, with John Armstrong as its first mayor. Haileybury was formally incorporated as a town in 1904. Farr encouraged settlement in the area, penning his own promotional pamphlet, entitled "The Lake Temiskamingue District", in an effort to attract new settlers to the region. Marketed to settlers as prime agricultural land, Haileybury had only a handful of residents until the arrival of the Temiskaming and Northern Ontario Railway in the early 1900s, and the subsequent discovery of large silver deposits in neighboring Cobalt in 1903. During the Cobalt Silver Rush, Haileybury became a 'bedroom community' that served the needs of the many miners and, most famously, many mine owners and managers. These mine managers and owners were responsible for the construction of the row of stately homes, nicknamed 'Millionaire's Row' that stretched along the waterfront on what is now Lakeshore Road, many of which still stand today. In 1909, the Haileybury Hockey Club played its first and only season in the NHA. The club was taken over and moved by Montreal's Club Antique-Canadien for the following season, and became the Montreal Canadiens. By 1912, Haileybury had been named the judicial seat for the Temiskaming Region, a title it retains to this day. The town of Haileybury annexed the neighbouring community of North Cobalt in 1971.

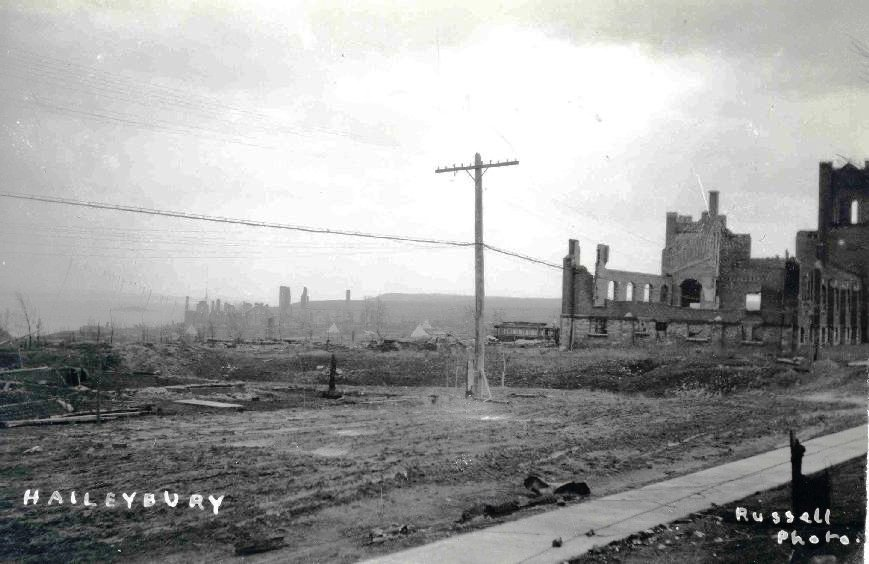
Haileybury after its destruction in the Great Fire of 1922.

The region was affected by the Great Fire of 1922, considered one of the worst disasters ever to befall the area. Haileybury suffered the worst damage, and approximately ninety percent of the town was destroyed, leaving only Millionaire's Row and a few other neighborhoods intact. The mass destruction is partially attributable to strong wind on the day of the fire. Approximately 3500 people were left homeless by the fire. The Toronto Transit Commission (TTC), with many retired street cars in its yards, sent many old car bodies to serve as houses during the reconstruction. Some of these cars remained for years, and one has recently been restored and is in the museum at Haileybury. As well, the area was affected by the 1935 Timiskaming earthquake, which had its epicentre at Lac Kipawa in Quebec, approximately halfway between the Haileybury/New Liskeard area and North Bay.

In 1971, the Township Municipality of Bucke (that included North Cobalt) was amalgamated with Haileybury.

In more recent history, Dymond still functions largely as an agricultural centre, while the commercial and industrial interests in the area have mostly shifted operations to the former town of New Liskeard. Haileybury maintains its status as a judicial seat, and is also home to the new city hall. A strong link to agriculture means that Temiskaming Shores has largely avoided the boom-and-bust cycle typical of most mining- and forestry-dependent small towns in Northern Ontario. Temiskaming Shores has also become a popular retirement and recreational destination, with small retirement communities like the Bayport Village being developed in the former town of Haileybury.

A 65,000-square-foot (6,000 m^{2}) building in Haileybury, built by area businessman Peter Grant as a combination home and office for his now-defunct company Grant Forest Products, was promoted as the largest house in Canada when Grant put it on the real estate market in 2010 for an asking price of $25 million.

In 2013, Temiskaming Shores was the main filming location for the movie Skating to New York.

Initially, as none of the old municipal office buildings were large enough to accommodate the expanded municipal staff of a single city, all three remained in use to house different city departments. A new city hall, located on Farr Drive in Haileybury, was completed in 2007.

== Demographics ==
In the 2021 Census of Population conducted by Statistics Canada, Temiskaming Shores had a population of 9,634 living in 4,263 of its 4,539 total private dwellings, a change of −2.9% from its 2016 population of 9,920. With a land area of 176.67 km^{2} (68.21 sq mi), it had a population density of 54.5/km^{2} (141.2/sq mi) in 2021. English was the mother language of 66.4% of Temiskaming Shore's population, while 28.4% of the city's residents spoke French as a mother language.

Census	Population
New Liskeard
1911	2,108
1921	2,268
1931	2,880
1941	3,019
1951	4,215
1961	4,896
1971	5,488
1981	5,551
1991	5,431
2001	4,906

Canada census – Temiskaming Shores community profile

	2021	2016	2011
Population	9,634 (-2.9% from 2016)	9,920 (-4.6% from 2011)	10,400 (-0.4% from 2006)
Land area	176.67 km^{2} (68.21 sq mi)	178.11 km^{2} (68.77 sq mi)	177.91 km^{2} (68.69 sq mi)
Population density	54.5/km^{2} (141/sq mi)	55.7/km^{2} (144/sq mi)	58.5/km^{2} (152/sq mi)
Median age	48.4 (M: 44.8, F: 50.8)	46.5 (M: 44.6, F: 48.2)
Private dwellings	4,539 (total) 4,263 (occupied)	4379 (total)	4621 (total)
Median household income	$71,500

References: 2021 2016 2011

Historical census populations – Temiskaming Shores
Year	Pop.	±%
2001	10,630	—
2006	10,442	−1.8%
2011	10,400	−0.4%
2016	9,920	−4.6%
2021	9,634	−2.9%
2006 Population figure based on revised count. Source: Statistics Canada

== Economy ==
The city is the economic and service hub to a population of approximately 32,500 from small communities in the surrounding region. Professional services and large retailers continue to open in the community to service regional customers from both Ontario and Quebec.

Timiskaming Square

The city's one enclosed shopping mall, Timiskaming Square, is located in the Dymond area at 883303 Highway 65 (47.51 N, 79.67 W). Owned by Plaza REIT, it opened in 1977 and has 21 stores. The mall has 164,142 sq. ft. (15,249 m^{2}) of space. Its popularity in the 1980s contributed to the decline of the downtown businesses of Haileybury and to a lesser extent New Liskeard. Many of the mall's customers are from Quebec, which is a short drive away on Highway 65.

During the Sunday shopping debate, the shopping centre was cited as one of the primary reasons the local representative voted in favour of the bill.

== Transportation ==
Highway 11 and Highway 65 pass through the city. The primary arterial route through Haileybury and New Liskeard also formerly held the business route designation Highway 11B.

Temiskaming Shores and Cobalt share a small public transit system, Tri-Town Transit.

The Ontario Northland bus service makes scheduled stops in New Liskeard, Dymond and Haileybury.

== Education ==
=== Separate schools ===
Administered by Conseil scolaire catholique de district des Grandes-Rivières:

- Ecole catholique Sainte-Croix
- Ecole catholique St-Michel
- Ecole secondaire catholique Sainte-Marie

Administered by Northeastern Catholic District School Board:

- English Catholic Central School

=== Public schools ===
Administered by District School Board Ontario North East:

- New Liskeard Public School
- Temiskaming District Secondary School (formerly New Liskeard Secondary School)

Administered by Conseil scolaire de district du Nord-Est de l'Ontario:

- Ecole publique des Navigateurs

=== Colleges ===
The Haileybury Campus of the English-language Northern College includes:

- veterinary technology programs, featuring advanced diplomas in Wildlife Rehabilitation and in Companion Animal Physical Rehabilitation that were the first of their kind in Canada.
- Haileybury School of Mines.

New Liskeard College of Agricultural Technology (1966-1993)

In 1966, the New Liskeard College of Agricultural Technology (NLCAT) was incorporated. Offering a two year diploma course, the college trained its students to become future farmers or businessmen in related fields.

=== Research Centres ===
- Ontario Crops Research Centre - New Liskeard
- Ontario Beef Research Centre - New Liskeard

== Media ==
=== Radio ===
Frequency	Call sign	Branding	Format	Owner	Notes
FM 99.7	CBON-FM-2	Ici Radio-Canada Première	Talk radio, public radio	Canadian Broadcasting Corporation	Rebroadcaster of CBON-FM Sudbury
FM 100.9	CJTK-FM-6	KFM	Christian music	Harvest Ministries Sudbury	Also on 105.7 FM in nearby Englehart; Rebroadcaster of CJTK-FM Sudbury
FM 102.3	CBCY-FM	CBC Radio One	Talk radio, public radio	Canadian Broadcasting Corporation	Rebroadcaster of CBCS-FM Sudbury
FM 103.1	CJBB		Country		(from nearby Englehart, Ontario)
FM 104.5	CJTT		adult contemporary	Connelly Communications	

=== Newspapers ===
Weekly community newspapers include The Temiskaming Speaker, Le Reflet and The Temiskaming Speaker Weekender and the biweekly The Voice of the Shores.

== Notable people ==
- Helen Doan (1911-2024), supercentenarian who was once the oldest living person in Canada
- Corey Perry (born 1985), NHL player for the Tampa Bay Lightning

== See also ==
- List of townships in Ontario
- List of francophone communities in Ontario
