= CJKL-FM =

Radio station in Kirkland Lake, Ontario

Coordinates: 48°04′18″N 80°01′37″W

- Kirkland Lake, Ontario; Canada
- Frequency: 101.5 MHz

Programming
- Format: hot adult contemporary

Ownership
- Owner: Connelly Communications
- Sister stations: CJTT-FM

History
- First air date: 1934
- Former frequencies: 1310 kHz, 560 kHz
- Call sign meaning: Kirkland Lake

Technical information
- Class: B
- ERP: 23 kWs
- HAAT: 72 meters (236 ft)

Links
- Website: www.cjklfm.com

CJKL-FM (101.5 MHz) is an FM radio station in Kirkland Lake, Ontario. The station is owned by Connelly Communications Corporation, which also owns CJTT-FM in Temiskaming Shores. Connelly Communications is owned by Rob Connelly of Kirkland Lake.

The station offers a hot adult contemporary format with a mix of current music and classic hits. Hourly news and sports is provided through local announcers/reporters and Broadcast News/Canadian Press. A live online feed is available on the station's website.

== History ==
CJKL first went on the air on March 30, 1934, on its original AM frequency at 1310 kHz as part of the Thomson media empire owned by Roy Thomson. In May 1939, CJKL moved to 560 kHz. In 1985, Connelly purchased CJKL and CJTT from Bob Ancell. On August 17, 1999, after 65 years on the AM dial, the station flipped from 560 AM to its current frequency at 101.5 FM with an effective radiated power of 23,000 watts.

Billionaire Jack Kent Cooke managed the station in the late 1930s & early 1940s for Thomson. CJKL broadcast one of the first radio call-in talk shows in Canada, which debuted in 1953 hosted by Anita Ross Thompson.

== CJKL Christmas Wish ==
Since 1986, CJKL has hosted the Christmas Wish program for less fortunate children in the Kirkland Lake area. Through several fundraisers and the contributions of local families, groups & businesses, the program provides new clothing and toys for over 250 children each year.

== CJKL Citizen of the Year Award ==
Since 1988, CJKL has presented this annual award to honour local citizens, groups and organizations who have contributed to improving the quality of life for the people of Kirkland Lake. In addition, the station also presents the CJKL Lifetime Achievement award recognizing a lifetime of contribution to the community.

== Merchant Mania Home Show ==
From 2004 to 2019, CJKL-FM hosted Kirkland Lake's annual home show on Mother's Day weekend on the floor of the community complex. The event drew over 5,000 people each year for a 2-day sale featuring local merchants and retailers from Canada & the United States.

== CJKL Carnival Queen Pageant ==
From 1989 to 2017, the station hosted the annual CJKL Carnival Queen Pageant. 16 contestants took part in events throughout January and February leading up to the crowning & fashion show at the Northern College auditorium during Kirkland Lake's Winter Carnival.
