= Meri Maa =

Meri Maa (lit. 'My Mother' in Hindi-Urdu) may refer to:

- Meri Maa (Indian TV series), a 2011–2012 Indian television drama series which aired on Life OK
- Meri Maa (Pakistani TV series), a 2013–2015 Pakistani television drama series that aired on Geo TV

== See also ==
- My Mother (disambiguation)
- Ganga Meri Maa, 1983 Indian film
