= List of Canadian supercentenarians =

People from Canada who have attained or surpassed the age of 110 years

This article lists Canadian supercentenarians (people from Canada who have attained the age of at least 110 years). The oldest verified Canadian person ever was Marie-Louise Meilleur, who died in 1998 aged 117 years, 230 days. As of 19 November 2026, the oldest living Canadian person is Katherine Baumchen, who was born in Saskatchewan on 10 February 1915 but currently resides in the United States, aged 111 years, 282 days. The oldest known living person in Canada is Marie Rosa, born 17 September 1915, aged 111 years, 63 days.

== 100 oldest known Canadians ==
Deceased Living

Rank	Name	Sex	Birth Date	Death Date	Age	Birthplace	Place of Death or Residence
1	Marie-Louise Meilleur	F	29 August 1880	16 April 1998	117 years, 230 days	Quebec	Ontario
2	Mary Ann Rhodes	F	12 August 1882	3 March 1998	115 years, 203 days	Ontario	Ontario
3	Julie Winnefred Bertrand	F	16 September 1891	18 January 2007	115 years, 124 days	Quebec	Quebec
4	Mary Josephine Ray	F	17 May 1895	7 March 2010	114 years, 294 days	Prince Edward Is.	United States
5	Cecile Klein	F	15 June 1907	13 January 2022	114 years, 212 days	Quebec	Quebec
6	Phyllis Ridgway	F	10 March 1907	4 June 2021	114 years, 86 days	United Kingdom	Ontario
7	Ellen Gibb	F	26 April 1905	5 June 2019	114 years, 40 days	Manitoba	Ontario
8	Merle Barwis	F	23 December 1900	22 November 2014	113 years, 334 days	United States	British Columbia
9	Anne Samson	F	27 February 1891	29 November 2004	113 years, 276 days	Nova Scotia	New Brunswick
10	Margaret Romans	F	16 March 1912	25 October 2025	113 years, 223 days	Latvia (Note: Romans was born in Latvia, then part of the Russian Empire, now an independent country.)	Quebec
11	Mabel Mah	F	4 July 1910	30 January 2024	113 years, 210 days	British Columbia	British Columbia
12	Lillian Ross	F	24 August 1879	20 March 1993	113 years, 208 days	Ontario	Ontario
13	Reita Fennell	F	20 November 1907	17 April 2021	113 years, 148 days	Saskatchewan	Saskatchewan
14	Zelda McCague	F	28 March 1888	6 August 2001	113 years, 131 days	Ontario	Ontario
15	Margaret Fitzgerald	F	16 September 1896	20 October 2009	113 years, 34 days	New Brunswick	New Brunswick
16	Cora Hansen	F	25 March 1899	18 April 2012	113 years, 24 days	United States	Alberta
17	Alice Sjöquist	F	25 October 1878	7 November 1991	113 years, 13 days	United Kingdom	British Columbia
18	Fanny Martland	F	19 November 1888	1 December 2001	113 years, 12 days	United Kingdom	British Columbia
19	Sarah Patenaude-Bruyère	F	20 February 1907	17 February 2020	112 years, 362 days	Ontario	Quebec
20	Hazel Campbell	F	7 December 1903	7 November 2016	112 years, 336 days	Quebec	United States
21	Hazel Skuce	F	7 February 1912	3 January 2025	112 years, 331 days	Manitoba	Manitoba
22	Flora Thibodeau	F	24 March 1901	22 January 2014	112 years, 304 days	New Brunswick	New Brunswick
23	Adéa Pellerin-Cormier	F	11 September 1901	24 May 2014	112 years, 255 days	New Brunswick	New Brunswick
24	Henrietta Irwin	F	27 May 1906	15 January 2019	112 years, 233 days	United Kingdom	Ontario
25	Gertruda Gorecka	F	12 November 1911	25 June 2024	112 years, 226 days	German Empire (Note: Gorecka was born in Kębłowo, Province of West Prussia, German Empire, which is now part of Pomeranian Voivodeship in Poland.)	Ontario
26	Helen Doan	F	18 September 1911	18 April 2024	112 years, 213 days	Ontario	Ontario
27	Alexina St. Pierre-Loyer	F	21 November 1907	22 May 2020	112 years, 183 days	Quebec	Quebec
28	Yvonne Delorme-Martel	F	22 October 1909	7 April 2022	112 years, 167 days	Quebec	Quebec
29	Annie Burtt	F	5 July 1880	11 December 1992	112 years, 159 days	New Brunswick	New Brunswick
30	Mary Roberts	F	5 October 1906	11 March 2019	112 years, 157 days	United Kingdom	British Columbia
31	Clara Mackenzie	F	7 October 1885	5 March 1998	112 years, 149 days	Newfoundland (Note: Mackenzie, Galode and McCoubrey were born in Newfoundland, then Newfoundland Colony, a colony of Britain. It is now a province of Canada.)	United States
32	Hazel Schultz	F	12 January 1913	27 May 2025	112 years, 135 days	Saskatchewan	United States
33	Fannie Greenberg	F	24 May 1895	5 October 2007	112 years, 134 days	Ontario	United States
34	Marie-Laure Nadon	F	12 April 1889	18 August 2001	112 years, 128 days	Quebec	Quebec
35	Annette Sabourin Brunet	F	4 January 1912	8 April 2024	112 years, 95 days	Quebec	Quebec
36	Mary MacIsaac	F	27 December 1893	10 March 2006	112 years, 73 days	New Brunswick	Saskatchewan
37	Julia Houde	F	18 September 1894	18 November 2006	112 years, 61 days	Quebec	Quebec
38	Mamie Smith	F	1 March 1889	25 April 2001	112 years, 55 days	Ontario	Ontario
39	Orma Slack	F	19 February 1903	13 April 2015	112 years, 53 days	Ontario	Ontario
40	Mary Ellen Swan	F	24 June 1892	10 August 2004	112 years, 47 days	United Kingdom	Ontario
41	Margherita Buttiri	F	8 May 1908	23 June 2020	112 years, 46 days	Croatia (Note: Buttiri was born in Rovigno, then in the Austrian Empire, now Rovinj, Croatia.)	Alberta
42	Maria Mallozzi	F	25 September 1887	26 October 1999	112 years, 31 days	Italy	Ontario
43	Emma Galode	F	22 August 1882	9 September 1994	112 years, 18 days	Newfoundland	Ontario
44	Simonne Leduc	F	31 October 1911	26 October 2023	111 years, 360 days	Quebec	Quebec
45	Marie-Blanche Portelance	F	21 March 1909	5 March 2021	111 years, 349 days	Quebec	Quebec
46	Colombe Benoît-Leclerc	F	5 February 1903	14 January 2015	111 years, 343 days	Quebec	Quebec
47	Agnes Munce	F	17 January 1877	16 December 1988	111 years, 334 days	Ontario	Alberta
48	Yvonne Lamoureux	F	5 December 1900	2 November 2012	111 years, 333 days	Quebec	Quebec
49	Arthur Nash	M	7 January 1885	4 November 1996	111 years, 302 days	United Kingdom	Manitoba
50	James McCoubrey	M	13 September 1901	5 July 2013	111 years, 295 days	Newfoundland	United States
51	Molly Schmidt	F	22 July 1905	8 May 2017	111 years, 290 days	Alberta	United States
52	Marguerite Wabano	F	28 January 1904	13 November 2015	111 years, 289 days	Ontario	Ontario
53	Delima Plouffe	F	9 June 1881	22 March 1993	111 years, 286 days	Ontario	Ontario
54	Katherine Baumchen	F	10 February 1915	Living	111 years, 282 days	Saskatchewan	United States
55	Isabel Dryden	F	16 October 1888	20 July 2000	111 years, 278 days	Ontario	British Columbia
56	Alice McLellan	F	6 August 1883	29 April 1995	111 years, 266 days	Nova Scotia	Nova Scotia
56	Florence Webber	F	22 July 1908	13 April 2020	111 years, 266 days	Nova Scotia	Nova Scotia
58	Reuben Sinclair	M	5 December 1911	27 August 2023	111 years, 265 days	Saskatchewan	British Columbia
59	Dora Skeen	F	29 December 1910	19 September 2022	111 years, 264 days	Jamaica (Note: Skeen and O'Hara were born in Jamaica, then part of the British West Indies. Jamaica became independent in 1962.)	Ontario
60	Merle O'Hara	F	20 February 1912	4 November 2023	111 years, 257 days	Jamaica	British Columbia
61	Minnie Mudie	F	18 November 1885	27 July 1997	111 years, 251 days	Saskatchewan	British Columbia
62	Irene Lantz	F	2 March 1914	24 October 2025	111 years, 236 days	Saskatchewan	Alberta
63	Berthe Courtemanche Verdone	F	11 May 1914	31 December 2025	111 years, 234 days	Quebec	Quebec
64	Jemima Westcott	F	10 January 1911	24 August 2022	111 years, 226 days	Manitoba	Manitoba
65	Marie-Louise Meunier	F	15 March 1887	24 October 1998	111 years, 223 days	Quebec	Quebec
66	Eva Carrier-Delisle	F	29 April 1908	22 November 2019	111 years, 207 days	Quebec	Quebec
67	Herman Smith-Johannsen	M	15 June 1875	5 January 1987	111 years, 204 days	Norway	Quebec (Note: Smith-Johannsen died in Norway while on a visit.)
67	Émilienne Marcil-Pigeon	F	29 March 1911	19 October 2022	111 years, 204 days	Quebec	Quebec
69	Gloriam Bellerive-Hebert	F	28 June 1901	14 January 2013	111 years, 200 days	Quebec	Quebec
70	Evangeline Saulnier	F	11 September 1890	19 March 2002	111 years, 189 days	New Brunswick	New Brunswick
71	Madge Snelling	F	18 August 1908	22 February 2020	111 years, 188 days	United Kingdom	Ontario
72	Ethel Lyman	F	8 June 1880	9 December 1991	111 years, 184 days	Ontario	Quebec
73	Marie Bibeault	F	31 January 1882	29 July 1993	111 years, 179 days	Quebec	Quebec
74	Edith Morey	F	28 July 1900	8 January 2012	111 years, 164 days	Ontario	Ontario
75	Jennie Sutherland	F	4 October 1906	15 March 2018	111 years, 162 days	United States	Alberta
76	Rose Lavender	F	29 August 1886	1 February 1998	111 years, 156 days	United Kingdom	Ontario
77	Louise Gibson	F	7 August 1883	2 January 1995	111 years, 148 days	Nova Scotia	United States
78	George Ives	M	17 November 1881	12 April 1993	111 years, 146 days	United Kingdom	British Columbia
79	Lilian Cornell	F	21 August 1904	11 January 2016	111 years, 143 days	United Kingdom	Saskatchewan
80	Isabella Hayes	F	17 June 1900	5 November 2011	111 years, 141 days	United Kingdom	Ontario
81	Hannah Bradford	F	28 December 1870	2 May 1982	111 years, 125 days	United Kingdom	Ontario
82	Clara Horvath	F	5 January 1911	7 May 2022	111 years, 122 days	British Columbia	British Columbia
83	Marguerite Robertson	F	13 May 1907	31 August 2018	111 years, 110 days	Nova Scotia	British Columbia
84	Bessie Roffey	F	2 March 1897	17 June 2008	111 years, 107 days	United Kingdom	Alberta
85	Virginia Muise	F	28 July 1893	2 November 2004	111 years, 97 days	Nova Scotia	United States
86	Emily McCool	F	13 December 1909	11 March 2021	111 years, 88 days	Ontario	Ontario
87	Mariette Barszczewicz	F	8 January 1909	4 April 2020	111 years, 87 days	Belgium	Ontario
88	Gisele Chalifour	F	20 June 1907	13 September 2018	111 years, 85 days	Quebec	Quebec
89	J. H. O.	F	17 January 1914	11 April 2025	111 years, 84 days	United Kingdom	British Columbia
90	Anna Nielsen	F	2 April 1904	19 June 2015	111 years, 78 days	Denmark	British Columbia
91	Maria Lacasse	F	6 December 1913	21 February 2025	111 years, 77 days	Quebec	Quebec
92	Linda Yale	F	28 December 1912	11 March 2024	111 years, 74 days	Quebec	British Columbia
93	Louise-Anna Turcotte	F	5 September 1905	12 November 2016	111 years, 68 days	Quebec	Quebec
94	Marie Rosa	F	17 September 1915	Living	111 years, 63 days	Ontario	Ontario
95	Rachel Bateman	F	16 January 1865	18 March 1976	111 years, 62 days	Ontario (Note: Ontario, at the time of Bateman's birth, was part of the British Province of Canada in British North America before the Canadian Confederation in 1867.)	Manitoba
96	Margaret Ives	F	28 January 1889	27 March 2000	111 years, 59 days	United Kingdom	Manitoba
97	Jessie Fraser	F	17 June 1883	14 August 1994	111 years, 58 days	Ontario	Nova Scotia
98	Selma Gaetz	F	12 May 1903	5 July 2014	111 years, 54 days	Alberta (Note: Gaetz was born in Mayton, Alberta, which was in the District of Alberta in the Northwest Territories before the formation of the province in 1905.)	United States
98	Margaret Cameron	F	9 February 1914	4 April 2025	111 years, 54 days	Alberta	British Columbia
100	Jennie Fitzgerald	F	5 December 1895	22 January 2007	111 years, 48 days	New Brunswick	New Brunswick

== Biographies ==
=== Julie Winnefred Bertrand ===
Julie Winnefred Bertrand (16 September 1891 – 18 January 2007) was the oldest woman and the second-oldest living person in the world behind Emiliano Mercado del Toro of Puerto Rico at the time of her death.

Bertrand was born in the Quebec mill town of Coaticook to her parents Napoleon Bertrand and Julia Mullins, and was the eldest out of six siblings. She spent her working career as a clothes buyer and saleswoman in her hometown. And although Bertrand never married, it was speculated that she was fairly close with Louis St. Laurent, who would eventually become the 12th prime minister of Canada.

She resided at a longterm care facility in Montreal throughout the last 35 years of her life. Upon being announced as the world's oldest woman after the death of Elizabeth Bolden of the United States on 11 December 2006, she wasn't hesitant with declining interviews about her new record.

Bertrand died in her sleep on 18 January 2007, after her death, Emma Tillman of the United States succeeded her as the world's oldest woman.

=== James McCoubrey ===
James Foster McCoubrey (13 September 1901 – 5 July 2013) was a Canadian-born American supercentenarian. Along with being the oldest living Canadian man at the time of his death, he was also the second-oldest known living man in both the United States and the rest of the world behind 112-year-old Spanish-born Salustiano Sánchez.

McCoubrey was born in St. John's, Newfoundland to his parents George Andrew McCoubrey and Jennie Isabel Foster. His father died from tuberculosis when he was just a toddler, and as a result, he moved into the house of his aunt Mary Foster who resided in Halifax, Nova Scotia. McCoubrey eventually moved houses for a second time at the age of 8, but this time to the United States in Cambridge, Massachusetts so he could reside with his mother again. He soon became an American citizen after his mother married his stepfather of James Hicks.

Throughout his adulthood, McCoubrey worked with various insurance companies and later started an insurance business of his own that worked in the motorcycle industry. He met his future wife Rose Helga Aurora Nordbeck at a canoe club on the Charles River in Boston in 1923 and went to marry her not that long after. Their only child, Patricia, was born in 1929 and the couple were married for nearly 70 years before Nordbeck's death in 1992 at the age of 90. After becoming widowed, he moved to his daughter and son-in-law's home in Walnut Creek, California, where he would reside for the remaining 20 years of his life.

McCoubrey was thought to have gained the world's oldest man title after the death of Jiroemon Kimura of Japan on 12 June 2013, who lived on to become the oldest verified man to ever live. He held the record until his death from pneumonia on 5 July 2013; however, the validation of Salustiano Sánchez meant McCoubrey never got the oldest living man title but still holds the record of being the oldest validated man ever born in Canada.

=== Reuben Sinclair ===
Reuben "Rube" Sinclair (5 December 1911 – 27 August 2023) was the oldest known living man in Canada, and oldest known living veteran of World War II.

Sinclair was born on the outskirts of Lipton, Saskatchewan to Yitzok (né Sandler) and Fraida (née Dubrovinsky) Sinclair – Ukrainian Jews that immigrated to Canada in 1905. His two older brothers, Samuel and Sol, were born in Ukraine, while his older sister Clara and younger brother Joe were born in Canada. His family's land was provided by the Jewish Colonisation Association. He worked on their farm.

Sinclair joined the Royal Canadian Air Force in 1942 and was stationed at North Battleford. According to his daughter, he "couldn't stand by and do nothing while people were dying in Europe". He taught pilots how to take off and land during blackouts, before radar was commonplace. Once it became standard, he worked in equipping aircraft with transmitters and receivers. His younger brother Joe served in the army, and after the war they moved to Richmond, British Columbia and started Sinclair Bros. Garage and Auto Wrecking.

He married a woman named Ida and they had three children: Nadine Lipetz, Karen and Len. In 1964, they moved to California; Sinclair suffered from migraines due to the war and his wife suggested they move to California to escape the cold weather and live closer to her siblings. His brother-in-law offered him a job in a furniture store in Anaheim. Ida suffered a stroke in 1994 and the Sinclairs moved back to British Columbia the same year. She died in 1996. Reuben resided in Richmond.

Sinclair was vaccinated against COVID-19 in March 2021, one of the oldest people to do so. Following the death of 109-year-old Tom Lumby on 19 June 2021, Sinclair was believed to have become Canada's oldest veteran. He became the oldest Canadian-born man upon the death of 110-year-old Arnold Hawkins on 18 September 2021. In November 2021, he had six grandchildren, 16 great-grandchildren and a great-great-grandchild. His family spanned five generations at the time of his death.

Following the death of 111-year-old American Ezra Hill on 4 October 2022, Sinclair was believed to have been the oldest World War II veteran in the world.
