= Smiley Bates =

- Born: Harvey Edgar Bates; October 16, 1937; Kirkland Lake, Ontario
- Died: January 8, 1997 (aged 59) Bent River, Ontario, Canada
- Genres: Country
- Occupation(s): Singer, songwriter, multi-instrumentalist.
- Years active: 1948–1997

Harvey Edgar Bates (October 16, 1937 – January 8, 1997), known professionally as Smiley Bates was a Canadian country singer, songwriter, and musician. He recorded over forty albums throughout his career and sold over three million records worldwide. Bates also performed on radio stations, CJKL-FM and CKJB. He died of cancer on January 8, 1997, at Bent River in Muskoka, Ontario, Canada.

== Early life ==
Born on October 16, 1937, in Kirkland Lake, Ontario, Canada, Harvey Edgar Bates (known as Smiley) was the youngest of eleven children; he had seven brothers and three sisters. Country music was a prominent feature in the Bates' family life; Bates senior played the fiddle and performed at square dances, where his backing band often included his wife who played piano. All of his siblings played musical instruments.

As a child, Smiley practiced playing his father's fiddle. Attracted to the guitar after hearing Hank Snow recordings, he began playing on an Eaton's mail-order guitar at age six. Later he also learned to play the banjo, mandolin, and dobro. In 1948, at eleven years of age, Smiley joined Curly Carter and the Mountaineers, playing the fiddle. In 1951, he formed his own band, the North Star Ramblers.

== Musical career ==
Smiley's band, the North Star Ramblers, consisted of himself on lead guitar, Mike LaPorte on fiddle, and Shep LaPorte on rhythm guitar. The band performed together for about five years, entertaining listeners on radio stations CJKL in Kirkland Lake and CKGB in Timmins.

After the LaPorte brothers moved to the Ottawa Valley, Smiley formed a new band featuring Jerry Goselin on rhythm guitar and bass, and Mike Zuppan on accordion. They played straight country and polkas in clubs where they worked on the Quebec circuit.

The band stayed together for three years before breaking up. Bates ended up in Oshawa, Ontario, a local centre for country music. There, he connected with Slim Gordon and undertook an Ontario tour which combined club dates and one-night stands at arenas and halls. By this time, country music had grown in popularity, and before television became established in Northern Ontario, there was a lucrative circuit for performers willing to tour from town to town.

Slim Gordon decided not to continue touring. Electric guitar player Leroy Glazier, and Rosemary St. John on electric bass, left Slim's band and joined Smiley. Leroy was offered a job in the United States, leading to the dissolution of the band. Smiley then performed in clubs as a single, or as a duo with Hank Beaman on rhythm guitar.

=== Recording and record deals ===
In 1966, Smiley recorded his first single. It included The Gal Who Invented Kissing and My Nova Scotia Home, and was issued as a custom pressing. A part-time D.J., who was off his shift at 6 A.M., recorded the songs in Smiley’s motel room at 7 A.M.

Bates met record producer Jack Boswell in 1968. Impressed by Bates' vocal and instrumental talents he signed him to a recording contract. Although Bates arrived at the studio suffering a hangover, he still managed to record three albums in five hours: "Golden Guitar", "5-String Banjo Bluegrass", and "Fiddler's Dream", engineered by the late Bill Bessey, who was known to his fans as "Cousin Bill" on CBC radio, and later the announcer on the Tommy Hunter TV Show.

In 1969, two additional albums were recorded. “Songs from the Heart” and “Flat Top Guitar Instrumentals” showcased Smiley’s talent and advanced his career.

=== Revised approach to touring ===
By 1971, when album sales were increasing, Smiley ceased performing at clubs, opting instead to undertake an annual tour of the Maritimes, in addition to attending annual events like the Shelburne Old Time Fiddle Festival.

In 1973, Doug Taylor (Smiley's record producer at the time) asked him to headline an all-Canadian country show in Wheeling, West Virginia, featuring Joe Firth, Bobby Munro, Joanne Post, Steve Smith, and Eastwind.

=== Commercial success ===
Smiley's albums caught on, not only in Ontario, but especially in the Maritimes and Newfoundland, and increasing sales brought more recording sessions, with carefully chosen album titles by Smiley himself, a factor that helped boost sales.

Titles such as "My Mother", "Songs Of Life", "Path of Memories", "True Stories From Life's Other Side", and "History of Sadness", point to the key to Smiley's vocal success - the hurting song.

Smiley's commercial success prompted other recording ventures. When the Instrumental hit "Duelling Banjos" from the film Deliverance was popular, Smiley, on Flat-Top Guitar, was teamed with Eddie Poirier on 5-String Banjo. Though he had not seen the film, it only took a couple of tries to arrive at an arrangement, which, while not representative of Smiley's recording output, was nevertheless a commercial success.

A further album was issued with Eddie and Smiley, and based upon its success, the two teamed up with Rose (Eddie's wife) to record another big-selling Bluegrass album, titled The Best of Bluegrass.

To illustrate how successful Smiley's recordings were, TeeVee Records, a direct to consumer sales company, put together a package of 20 songs and instrumentals from Smiley's previous albums entitled The Best of Smiley Bates. This album sold in excess of 100,000 units of records and tapes and did particularly well in the Maritimes. Due to the success of the TV record sales Smiley was offered long term recording contracts by three major recording companies.

Some of Bates' most successful songs include: "Will You Love Me When I'm Old and Feeble", "Don't Tell Jeannie I'm Blind", "My Daddy's Eyes", "I'll Go Get The Toolbox", "Daddy and the Wine", and "Let Me In" by Gene Chrysler. Probably the most requested was the song "Golden Guitar" written by Curtis Leach.

After the release of the first instrumental album in 1968, more were recorded to meet the demand. Smiley's own instrumental numbers such as "Crying Guitar", "The Last Sunrise", "Charlie's Boogie", "Flat Top Chimes", and "Newfoundland Reel" please fans of the Flat Top Guitar.

== Later years ==
Bates traveled widely playing at festivals and fairs where he met hundreds of fans. "Without the people, there wouldn't be me", stated Smiley, who enjoyed prioritizing his fanbase and maintaining his knowledge of their favorite songs. He has been called the "King of Hurtin' Songs".

== Death ==
Bates continued to record, and to perform for fans during the mid-1990s, until he was diagnosed with cancer. Bates' final live performance was at the Manitoulin Folk Festival.

Before he died, Smiley wrote this note of thanks to his many fans:

"So Long Folks, I'd like to thank each and everyone of my friends and fans for sticking with me through my forty-seven years in the music business. From the hard times in the beginning to the good times at the last, you followed me down each and every country road. You were part of my music to the very last note. I want you to know how much I appreciate your loyalty. I enjoyed playing the music, but having fans and friends... that was my real reward. I have been a fortunate man. I got to make my living doing what I loved, and the people seemed to love what I was doing. I feel my life is complete. Musically Yours Smiley Bates, Bent River, Ontario, Canada.

Bates' final three years were spent battling cancer and he eventually died on January 8, 1997, in Bent River, Ontario, Canada.

== Discography ==
- 5-String Banjo Bluegrass (1968)
- Fiddler's Dream (1968)
- Golden Guitar (1968)
- Flat Top Guitar Instrumentals (1969)
- Songs from the Heart (1969)
- Songs of Life (1971)
- My Mother (1971)
- Hey, Mr. Banjo! (1972, with Eddie Poirier)
- Path of Memories (1973)
- The Best of Bluegrass (1974, with Eddie and Rose Poirier)
- In The Mood for Pickin' (1974)
- Country Tears (1974)
- True Stories from Life's Other Side (1974)
- The History of Sadness (1974)
- The Best of Smiley Bates (1977)
- Lullabyes and Legends (1978)
- 20 Great Country Hits (1980)
- Songs of the Heart (1982)
- House of Shame (1983)
- Instrumentally Yours (1984)
- A Million Miles of Country (1984)
- Sing Me a Sad Song (1989)
- Bent River Boogie (1994)
- Book of Memories (1994)
- Good & Country (1994)
- Nova Scotia Queen (1994)
- Portrait of Stone (1995)
- The Soul of Country (1995)
- Goin' Home (1996)
- Dust On the Bible (1996)
