= Northeastern Catholic District School Board =

Northeastern Catholic District School Board NCDSB

Location
- 383 Birch St N Timmins, ON; P4N 6E8 Cochrane District and Timiskaming District Canada

District information
- Chair of the board: Fred Salvador Jr.
- Director of education: Tricia Stefanic Weltz
- Schools: 12 elementary 1 secondary
- District ID: B29009

Other information
- Elected trustees: Denis Lincez (Vice Chair), Glenn Sheculski, Colleen Landers, Elizabeth King, Martin Drainville, Ron MacInnis, Stan Skalecki, Steve Malciw
- Website: www.ncdsb.on.ca

The Northeastern Catholic District School Board (NCDSB, known as English-language Separate District School Board No. 30A prior to 1999) is a separate (Catholic) school board in the Canadian province of Ontario, with jurisdiction for the operation of schools in Cochrane and Timiskaming Districts.

Northeastern Catholic District School Board is located in Northeastern Ontario and covers a vast area. The board is responsible for providing Catholic education, and its 13 schools serve the communities of Cobalt, Cochrane, Englehart, Iroquois Falls, Kapuskasing, Kirkland Lake, Moosonee, New Liskeard, South Porcupine and Timmins. Its head office is located in Timmins, the largest city in the district, and the site of the only high school in the board.

== Elementary schools ==
- Aileen Wright English Catholic School, Cochrane
- Bishop Belleau Catholic School, Moosonee
- English Catholic Central School, New Liskeard
- Holy Family School, Englehart
- Sacred Heart Catholic School, Kirkland Lake
- Pope Francis Elementary School, Timmins
- St. Anne English Catholic School, Iroquois Falls
- St. Jerome School, Kirkland Lake
- St. Joseph School, South Porcupine
- St. Patrick Catholic School, Cobalt
- St. Patrick School, Kapuskasing

== Intermediate School ==
- O'Gorman Intermediate Catholic School, Timmins

== Secondary school ==
- O'Gorman High School, Timmins

== Adult Education School ==
- ACCESS Program - Alternative and Continuing Adult Education Support Services, Timmins

== See also ==
- List of school districts in Ontario
- List of high schools in Ontario
