= Devil's Rock =

Escarpment in Timiskaming District, Ontario

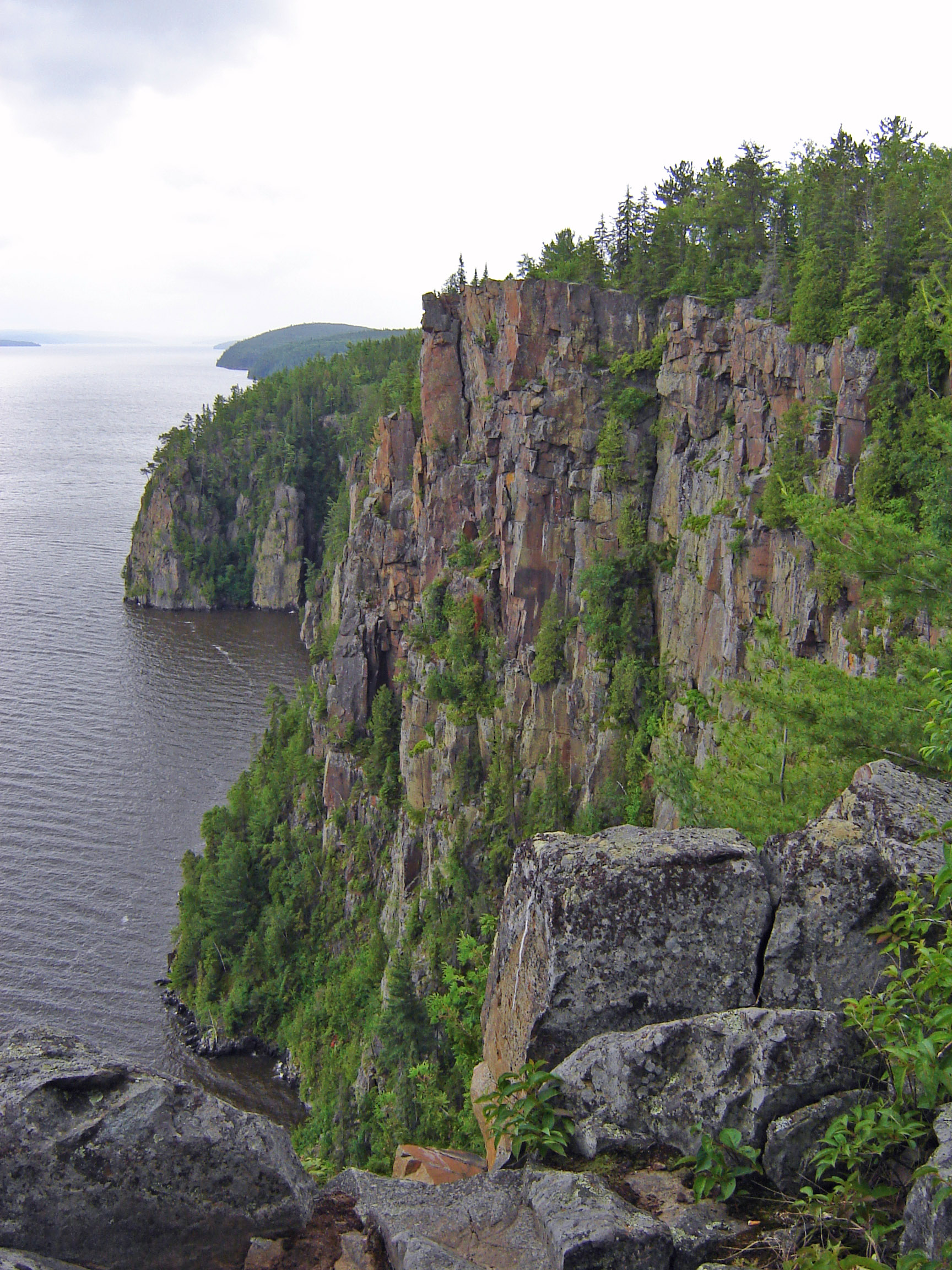
Devil's Rock

Devil's Rock (also known as Devils Rock; Anishinaabe: Mani-doo Aja-bikong or Manidoo Wabikong) is a granite escarpment located 5 kilometres (3 mi) south of Temiskaming Shores, Ontario, Canada. The cliffs rise 300 feet (91 m) above Lake Timiskaming and extend nearly as far underwater as they do above, giving Devil's Rock a cliff face roughly 600 feet (180 m) tall.

== History ==
Devil's Rock exists within the territories of the Anishinaabe nation, a First Nations civilization. According to an 1879 account by a European trader using the pseudonym Sha-Ka-Nash, the cliffs were originally known as "Manidoo-Wabikong" (English: "Manitou rock") and were a sacred place where offerings of tobacco were made. Some sites in the region that were once named for the Manitou were renamed by missionaries to reference the Devil in an effort to Christianize Indigenous communities by framing their deities as evil spirits. Manidoo-Wabikong was one such site, and thus became known as "Devil's Rock". Following European colonization the region became part of British North America before Canadian Confederation occurred in 1867, when it was integrated into the province of Ontario.

In the early 1900s, Robert Bell of the Geological Survey of Canada claimed that there must be deposits of silver at Devil's Rock but was unable to find any himself. When the Cobalt silver rush picked up in nearby Cobalt, Ontario, nationally acclaimed lacrosse player Matthew Murphy discovered the first silver deposits at Devil's Rock and lay claim to them, as well as two others. Murphy moved to Haileybury from his hometown of Cornwall, Ontario, and from 1903 to 1912 employed miners to exploit a number of veins along the cliffs. As the veins were readily accessible from the water, Murphy opted not to build mine shafts from the cliff tops down and instead decided to have the miners transport their finds from the cliffs to the shore using drifts, with tunnels being dug into the cliffs to reach the lodes located below the shoreline. Ottawa resident Jackson Booth managed the Devil's Rock mines. Murphy's mines left behind tunnels that can still be entered today. Proceeds from the mines made Matt Murphy wealthy, and he invested some of his wealth into local sports venues including ice rinks.

While searching for Anishinaabe pictographs in 1929, mountaineer Aleister Crowley visited Devil's Rock at the suggestion of local miners. Crowley attempted to climb a section of the cliffs known as the "Finger of God", along a route known to modern rock climbers as "Samson"; during this climb one of his chockstones became trapped in the stone, where it remained for decades.

The steamship Meteor was the only passenger vessel that traversed Lake Temiskaming until 1899, and the ship would not be decommissioned until 1923. During this time the ship was popular for sight-seeing along the lake, and its owners would run advertisements inviting travellers to take a trip aboard the ship and view the area's scenic landmarks, including Devil's Rock.

Prior to the annexation of North Cobalt by Haileybury in 1971, there was a minor rift between the two communities over which had a proper claim to Devil's Rock. Haileybury and North Cobalt became part of the amalgamated community Temiskaming Shores in 2004.

Alberta-born rock climber and author David Smart noted several ascensions up the cliff face in his 1998 book Ontario's Finest Climbs, and later published a guidebook dedicated specifically to Devil's Rock. In 2010, the Federal Economic Development Initiative for Northern Ontario established the Temiskaming Loop, a motorcycle touring route in the Lake Temiskaming area which encouraged visiting local attractions, including Devil's Rock. It has been named an "Area of Natural & Scientific Interest" by the Temiskaming Rift Valley Aspiring Geopark, which has proposed creating a geosite that encompasses Devil's Rock.

== Geology ==
Devil's Rock is an instrusive contact made of quartz diabase. It is part of the Nipissing sills and fronts on the Timiskaming Graben. The stone which forms the escarpment was formed by volcanic activity 2.2 billion years ago.

== Ecology ==
Devil's Rock is located inside an ecotone, a transitionary area between separate ecoregions: the boreal forest and the Great Lakes-St. Lawrence forest. The vegetation at the peak of Devil's Rock is mostly stunted. Blueberry bushes are plentiful there, as are balsam fir trees. Eastern spruce budworms can be found feeding on fir trees in the area.

Peregrine falcons hunt and roost in the area and are often sighted at Devil's Rock. Other birds present around the cliffs include American yellow warblers, Nashville warblers, and Chestnut-sided warblers.

== Recreation ==
The cliffs of Devil's Rock can be easily viewed from Lake Timiskaming and approached by boat. There are five former mining tunnels that are today accessible from the water, though a flashlight is necessary to safely explore them.

The peak is accessed through two hiking trails, the shorter being a mostly-flat path which is 2 kilometres (1.2 mi) long and accessessible from a roadside entry point along Highway 567. The trail is usable in all seasons and is amenable to snowshoes in winter. The longer trail extends 3 kilometres (1.9 mi) and is entered at the municipally-owned Bucke Park Campground, and features greater inclines than its counterpart which make it a more precarious hike in the winter. A number of smaller, meandering paths lead to viewing points along the clifftops.

Rock climbing is possible at Devil's Rock but rare, with belays bolted into the cliff face to enable multi-pitch climbing. Rock climbing has been practiced at Devil's Rock since at least 1929. There are eleven named ascensions up the cliffs, including "The Awe Inspiring Rites" and "Bombay Sapphire".

Despite a lack of official signage, Devil's Rock is one of the stops recommended by those travelling the Temiskaming Loop, one of the top ten motorcycle rides in North America.

There are very few fences and no supervisors to keep hikers from falling over the cliffs at Devil's Rock. Signs along the overlook's trails provide warnings when approaching the cliffs, and a large white cross is installed at the edge to remind visitors that the 300 feet (91 m) fall from the height of Devil's Rock is deadly.

== In myth ==
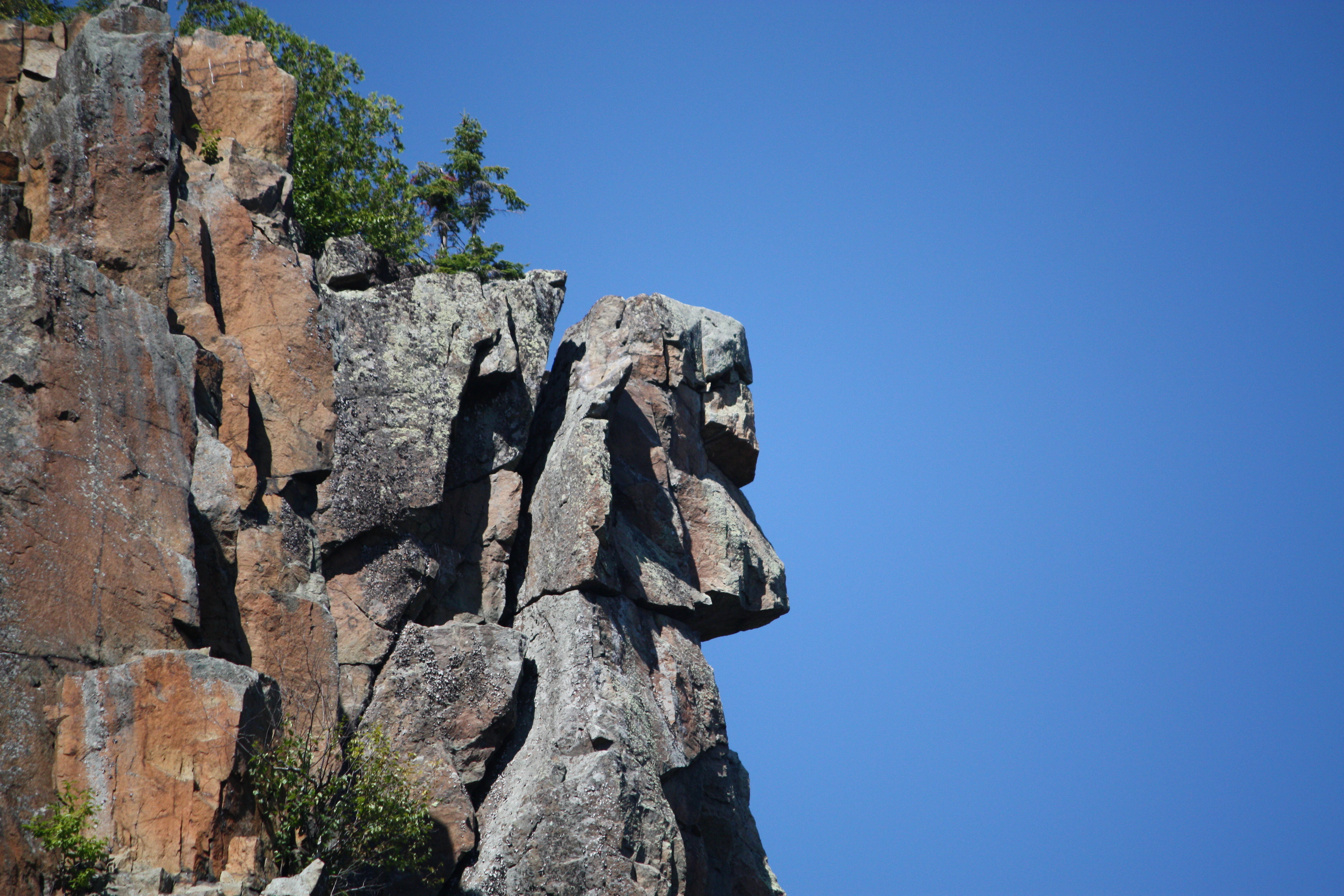
The "Devil's face" at Devil's Rock

Prior to European colonization, the Anishinaabeg called the cliffs "Manidoo-Wabikong" (English: "Manitou rock") and treated the site as a sacred place where offerings of tobacco were made. Reflecting on a canoe trip undertaken in 1879, 19th-century trader Sha-Ka-Nash commented:

So we put off and sailed down the big Lake Témiscamingue. When we came down to the big steep rocks on the west side the Indian crews had a great talk in their own language, and everyone who used tobacco, put a little in the water in front of the steep rocks, the writer adding his quota with the rest. I never learned the real significance of the performance, but anyone who passed on the lake with a loaded canoe in front of those rocks will know that such practice was very advisable to court the favor of the water sprite.

Several different myths surrounding Devil's Rock have been attributed to Native religions by European and non-Native Canadians, though none have been confirmed as part of Anishinaabe mythology. Folklorist and author John Robert Colombo has suggested that the people of Timiskaming First Nation (Algonquin: Saugeen Anishabeg, "people of the river mouth") once referred to the cliffs as "Frog Lake" in reference to a creature which, having taken the shape of a giant frog, smashed the rocks and created the formation as it exists today. Bill "Backroads Bill" Steer, founder of the Canadian Ecology Centre, claims there is an Anishinaabe legend in which Devil's Rock was home to the Memequayshowak, diminutive creatures known in English as "rock demons". In this telling of events, an Anishinaabe raiding party captured one of the demons and his knife, but one of the surviving Memequayshowak was able to retreate into the cliff's crevices and create such intimidating reverberations that the attackers withdrew and threw the dagger back to the cliffs, which they now believed contained an entrance to the underworld.

French traders also inspired new folklore surrounding Devil's Rock and Lake Temiskaming. Regular tremors around the lake disturbed voyageurs, and some came to believe that tapping sounds on the bottom of their boat were the fault of water sprites who had enlisted fish to follow their canoes. Appropriating practices learned from their Native forebears, the traders would leave offerings of tobacco at spots like Devil's Rock to ensure safe passage across the lake. According to another French-Canadian legend, the cliffs were created when the Devil eloped with a girl from the Temiskaming area, but on their honeymoon the Devil became tired of his bride and turned her into Devil's Rock.

Between 1979 and 1982 local citizens embraced the story of the Mugwump, a cryptid alleged to be living in Lake Temiskaming.

A modern urban legend suggests that when viewed from the right angle, the cliffs at Devil's Rock resemble the face of the Devil, an example of pareidolia.

== In popular culture ==
Leslie McFarlane, author of young adult mystery novels including (under the pen name Franklin W. Dixon) a number of early Hardy Boys books, derived inspiration from landmarks the Haileybury area. Devil's Rock is one such site, making an appearance in The House on the Cliff as an unnamed cliff, where McFarlane (as the narrator) gives it the following description:

The cliff jutted up out of very deep water and rose to a great height. ... The face of the steep rock was uncompromising. There seemed to be no foothold for man or beast. It was just an unscalable, craggy wall.

A number of local businesses in the area have capitalized on the image and notoriety of Devil's Rock. Products named for the formation include the "Devil's Rock" artisanal blue cheese, which in 2017 was recognized by Dairy Farmers of Canada as the top cheese to represent the country during Canada 150 celebrations. In 2014, Devil's Rock cheese was cited by John Vanthof, MPP for Timiskaming—Cochrane as being a source of pride that Ontario owed to El Salvador-born cheesemaker Martin Melendez, a local Latin Canadian, and part of the reason Vanthof chose to endorse the province's establishment of an Hispanic Heritage Month. A Caesar cocktail has also been named in reference to the cliffs.
