= CJTT-FM =

Radio station in Temiskaming Shores, Ontario

Coordinates: 47°22′33″N 79°40′33″W

- Temiskaming Shores, Ontario; Canada
- Frequency: 104.5 MHz
- Branding: CJTT 104.5 FM

Programming
- Format: hot adult contemporary

Ownership
- Owner: Connelly Communications
- Sister stations: CJKL-FM

History
- First air date: 1967
- Former frequencies: 1230 kHz (AM) (1967–1998)
- Call sign meaning: "Tri-Towns", the broadcast area served

Technical information
- Class: B
- ERP: 10 kWs
- HAAT: 152.5 meters (500 ft)

Links
- Website: www.cjttfm.com

CJTT-FM 104.5 is an FM radio station in Temiskaming Shores, Ontario, with a hot adult contemporary format. The station is owned by Connelly Communications Corporation, which is owned by Rob Connelly of Kirkland Lake.

The station offers a hot adult contemporary format with a mix of current music and classic hits. Hourly news and sports is provided through local announcers/reporters and Broadcast News / Canadian Press. A live online feed is available on the station's website.

== History ==
CJTT was originally launched in 1967 at 1230 kHz on the AM band as a semi-satellite station of CJKL. The station was originally owned by Kirkland Lake Broadcasting Ltd. Connelly Communications Corporation purchased CJTT and CJKL in Kirkland Lake in 1985. CJTT was a CBC affiliate from 1987–1996. In 1998, CJTT moved from 1230 AM to its current FM frequency at 104.5 FM.

In 2002, CJTT won the Community Builder Award for its longstanding community involvement. It was presented in Haileybury, during An Evening of Excellence.

== Programming ==
CJTT airs the syndicated American Top 40 and Country Top 40 on weekends. Most of the programs on CJTT also air on sister station CJKL.

== Notes ==
On December 13, 1984, the CRTC approved a number of applications for a number of AM radio stations across Ontario including CJTT New Liskeard to increase their nighttime power from 250 watts to 1,000 watts.
