= Margaret Romans =

Oldest person in Canada (1912–2025)

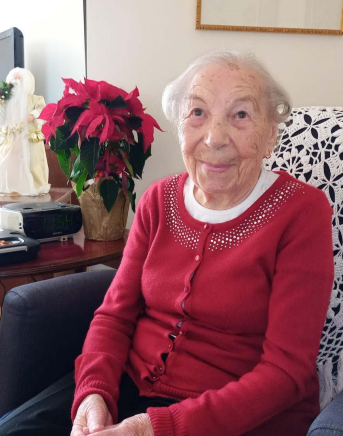
- Romans in 2025
- Born: 16 March 1912; Riga, Russian Empire (now Latvia)
- Died: 25 October 2025 (aged 113 years, 223 days)
- Occupation: Art teacher
- Known for: Oldest living Canadian person (3 January 2025 – 25 October 2025); Oldest Latvian person ever
- Spouse: Heinrich Romans (m. 1941; died 2002)

Margaret Romans (16 March 1912 – 25 October 2025) was a Latvian-born Canadian supercentenarian who was the oldest living person in Canada from the death of Hazel Skuce on 3 January 2025 until her own death.

== Biography ==
Margarita Anna Mežgaile was born on 16 March 1912 in Riga, Latvia (then part of the Russian Empire). Her mother was of German and Latvian descent, and her father was a Latvian merchant. In 1941, she married Heinrich Romans.

The couple did not have any children. After fleeing from Latvia, they lived in Germany for a couple of years before emigrating to Canada in 1947. Romans worked as an art teacher at YMCA, and her husband was an engineer.

In 2002, Romans was widowed and lived independently in Westmount, Quebec, until she was 107, when she moved into a nursing home in Montreal.

In 2024, at 112-years-old, Romans could still walk with assistance and also followed current events.

Her age was verified in September 2024, by the Gerontology Research Group. On 3 January 2025, after the death of 112-year-old Hazel Skuce, Romans became the oldest living Canadian person.

She lived in Sainte-Geneviève, Montreal, Quebec, Canada, before her death on 25 October 2025. Following her death, 111-year-old Berthe Courtemanche Verdone succeeded Romans as Canada’s oldest living person.
