= O'Gorman High School (Timmins) =

Location
- 150 George Avenue; Timmins, Ontario, P4N 4M1; Canada; 48.4855°N 81.340°W

Information
- School type: Catholic
- Motto: Omnia Vincit Veritas
- Religious affiliation: Roman Catholic
- Founded: 1953
- School board: Northeastern Catholic District School Board
- School number: 1-705-268-4501
- Principal: Sean Robertson
- Grades: 9-12 English; 9-12 Extended French
- Enrollment: 400 (2019/2020)
- Language: English; Extended French
- Colours: Green and White
- Mascot: Knight
- Team name: O'Gorman Knights
- Website: Official website

O'Gorman High School is a Catholic high school located in Timmins, Ontario, Canada serving students in grades 9–12.

The school was founded in 1953 and named for John Robert O'Gorman (1880–1948), a Catholic priest who served in the area from 1926 to 1948.

== See also ==
- Education in Ontario
- List of secondary schools in Ontario
