= Great Fire of 1922 =

Wildfire in Ontario, Canada

Coordinates: 47°27′N 79°39′W

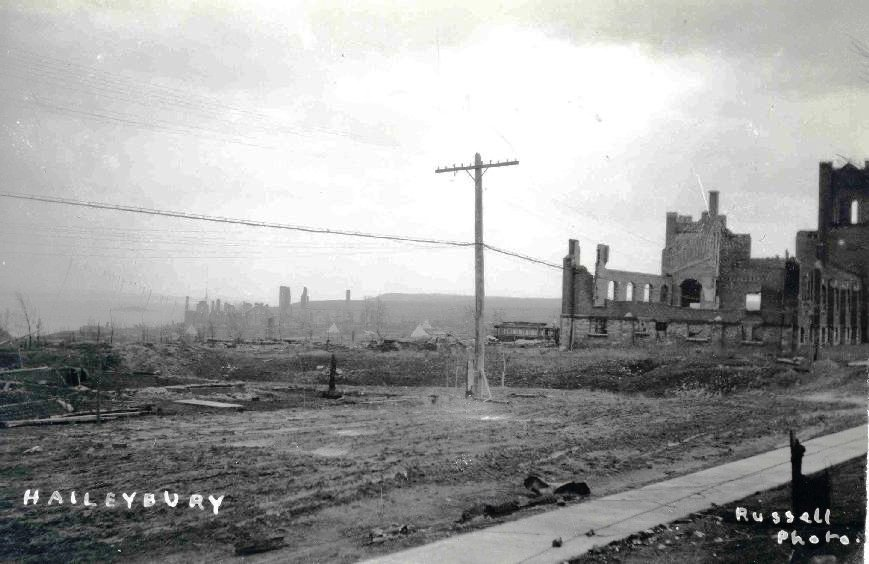
Devastation in Haileybury after the Great Fire of 1922

The Great Fire of 1922 was a wildfire burning through the Lesser Clay Belt in the Timiskaming District, Ontario, Canada, from October 4 to 5, 1922. It has been called one of the ten worst natural disasters in Canadian history.

The preceding summer had been unusually hot and dry. Fire rangers, anticipating the upcoming "burn" season, had requested to stay in the area but were not granted permission. They left at the end of the fire season in mid September, leaving the area without fire protection services. In the fall when burning permits were no longer required, farmers and settlers started to set small bush fires to clear the land. Dry conditions had persisted past the usual "burn" season and on October 4, the wind turned into hurricane-force gales, fanning the flames out of control and combining the brush fires into one large inferno.

Over two days, the fire consumed an area of 1,680 square kilometres (650 sq mi), affecting 18 townships in Ontario. It completely destroyed the communities of North Cobalt, Charlton, Thornloe, Heaslip, and numerous smaller settlements. Englehart and New Liskeard were partly burnt. In all 43 people died. In Quebec, the communities of Notre-Dame-du-Nord and neighbouring Notre-Dame-des-Quinze were also devastated. The fires were extinguished when the winds abated and rain and snow began to fall on October 5, 1922.

One of the towns hit hardest was Haileybury which burnt down within 3 to 6 hours. Thick smoke caused panic and confusion. The town's residents were forced to take refuge in the cold waters of Lake Timiskaming and cover themselves with wet blankets. The fire destroyed over 90% of the town, killing 11 residents, leaving 3500 people homeless, and causing $2 million of damage.

The people of Charlton took refuge in the power house; a baby was born there that night. The Power House later burned while being used for grain grinding. It was later rebuilt and a plaque was placed to commemorate the fire. An area of 246,000 hectares was destroyed in the fire.

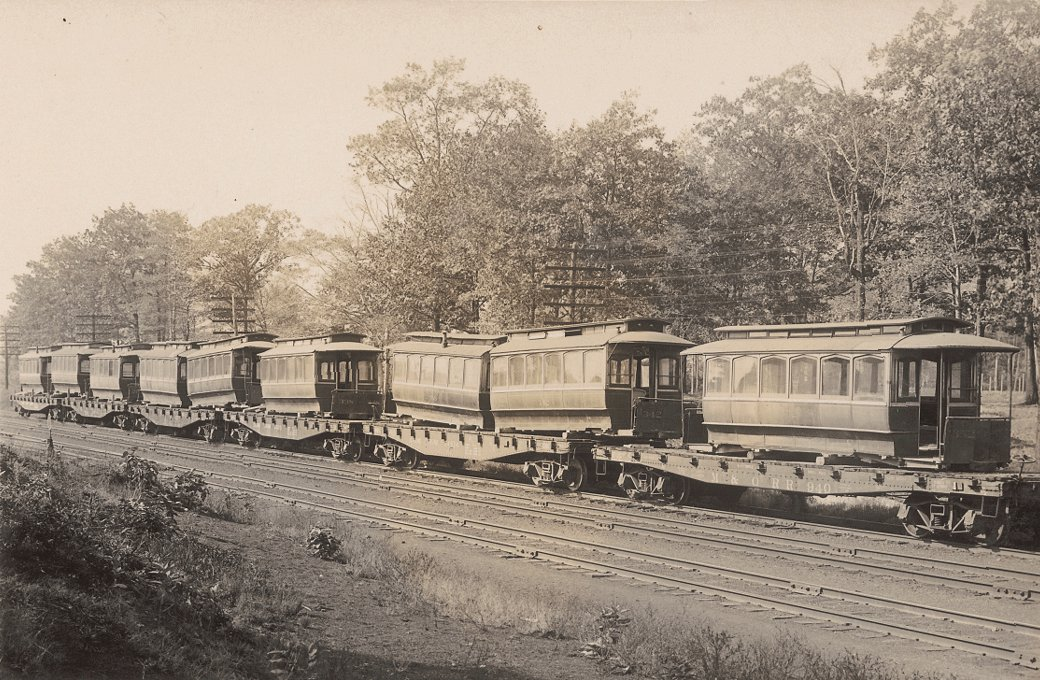
TTC streetcar bodies shipping to Haileybury.

Hardships remained for the survivors, who had lost all their belongings and faced the approaching winter. Consequently, a large emergency relief program was organized for the affected area. The Toronto Transit Commission (TTC), with many retired street cars in its yards, sent many old car bodies to serve as houses during the reconstruction. Some of these cars remained for years, and one has recently been restored and is in the museum at Haileybury. Furthermore, the fire had consumed all the nearby forests, causing a severe shortage of firewood and forcing people for many years to travel far in order to obtain it.

== See also ==
- Great Matheson Fire of 1916 - wildfire with similar circumstances and outcome.
- List of Canadian disasters by death toll
