= Northern College (Ontario) =

Public college in Timmins, Ontario, Canada

Northern College of Applied Arts and Technology
- Motto: Proud to be north. Proud to be Northern.
- Type: Public College of Applied Arts and Technology
- Established: 1967
- Affiliations: CCAA, ACCC, AUCC
- Budget: $173 Million ($98 Million international student revenue)
- Chair: Kraymr Grenke
- Vice-president: Dean Lessard, Evan Sonkin
- President: Mitch Dumas
- Faculty: 79
- Students: 2015 full time, 15,000 part-time and continuing education (2025: 793 FTEs)
- Location: Timmins, Ontario, Canada; 48°29′17″N 81°11′52″W
- Campus: Timmins (Porcupine), Kirkland Lake, Moosonee, and Temiskaming Shores (Haileybury)
- Colours: orange, charcoal
- Mascot: North the Moose
- Website: https://www.northerncollege.ca/

Northern College of Applied Arts and Technology, commonly known as Northern College, is a college of applied arts and technology in Northern Ontario, Canada. It is partnered with private Pures College of Technology in Midland and Scarborough. The college's catchment area extends across 58,000 square miles or 150,200 square kilometres. More than 65 communities within Northeastern Ontario are served by four campuses located in Timmins, Kirkland Lake, Moosonee, and Temiskaming Shores (Haileybury). Annual enrolment is approximately 1,500 full-time students. Annual part-time and continuing education enrolment exceeds 11,000 students. Northern College is also home to the Haileybury School of Mines, which predates the college and was founded in 1912.

== History ==
Northern College was established during the formation of Ontario's college system in 1967. Colleges of applied arts and technology were established on May 21, 1965. It is an Ontario College of Applied Arts and Technology. The school was founded in 1967 as part of a provincial initiative to create many such institutions to provide career-oriented diploma and certificate courses, as well as continuing education programs to Ontario communities.

The first campus was built in Kirkland Lake, followed by Porcupine (now part of the amalgamated city of Timmins), Haileybury (where the pre-existing Haileybury School of Mines joined as a campus; now part of the amalgamated city of Temiskaming Shores), and Moosonee, previously the James Bay Education Centre. The Northern College tartan was designed by Sylvia Martin.

Though the college traditionally drew students from Ontario's hinterland, today 82% of the college's students come from abroad, mostly from India. Ontario's Ministry of Colleges and Universities caps the number of foreign students a public college can enrol at a private partner institution at two times the number of students at the home campus. However, in 2022 Northern's partner Pures College of Technology had 8.6 times as many students as the Timmins campus.

Following a promise from former college president Audrey Penner that the decision would not turn into a public relation nightmare, Northern College came to international attention in 2023 after retroactively revoking college admissions for international students. At first revoking 500 students and later that year, revoking another 200 students. The college reported $84 million in international student revenue in 2023, an increase of $55 million from the previous year. Despite the additional revenue many students without housing were forced to seek emergency shelter through community organizations. The revocation of admission caused severe financial hardship for many students who had already bought flights to Canada and would no longer be allowed to enter the country, due to their visa being tied to their college admission. President Audrey Penner's departure was announced later that year.

In 2024 the province of Ontario provided $2.1 million for new equipment and the college collected $98 million in revenue from international students. In 2025, the college announced layoffs predicting a budget deficit of $6 million.

== Campuses ==
- Timmins Campus - also home to Social Work and Community Development for Algoma University
- Kirkland Lake Campus
- Haileybury Campus
- Moosonee Campus

== Timmins Campus ==
The Timmins Campus, which is the main campus of Northern College is located in Timmins, Ontario. It was constructed in the 1960s on the shore of Porcupine Lake.

== Programs ==
In 2012-13 the most popular program was Collaborative Nursing followed by Social Service Worker. In 2019-20 the most popular program was Social Service Worker followed by Collaborative Nursing. Following a dramatic increase in foreign student enrolment in 2020-21 the most popular programs are now Business, and Computer Engineering Technology.

== Residences ==
- Timmins Campus Residence
- Haileybury Campus Residence

== See also ==
- Higher education in Canada
- List of agricultural universities and colleges
- List of colleges in Ontario
- List of universities in Canada
