= Haileybury, Ontario =

Community and former town in Timiskaming District, Ontario, Canada

Haileybury is a community and former town in the Timiskaming District of northeastern Ontario, Canada, on the western shore of Lake Timiskaming. Founded in 1889 and incorporated as a town in 1904, it grew rapidly during the nearby Cobalt silver rush and was the administrative centre of the district from 1912 to 2003. In 2004, Haileybury amalgamated with New Liskeard and Dymond to form the town of Temiskaming Shores.

== History ==
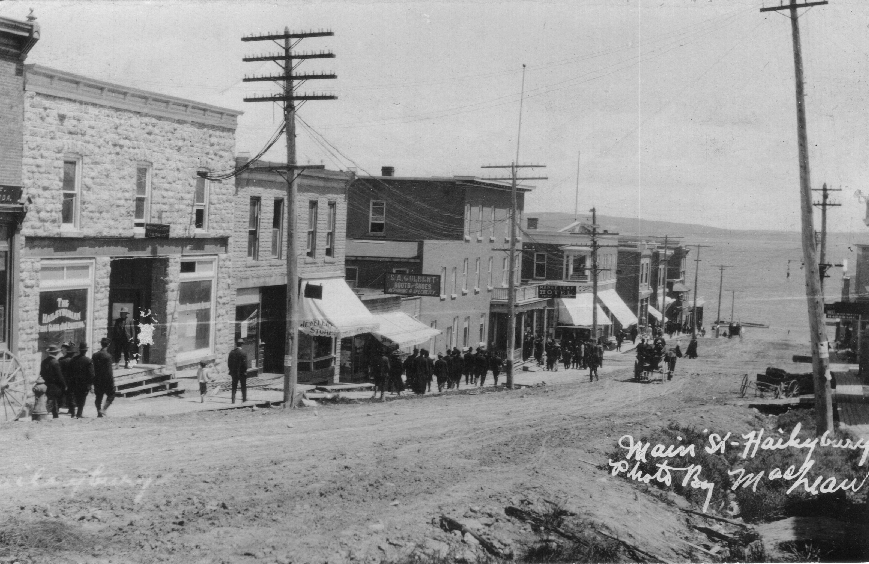
Haileybury, Ontario, Canada - 1915.

Haileybury was established by Charles Cobbold Farr, Hudson’s Bay Company employee, in 1889. He had named it after his college in England, Haileybury and Imperial Service College. It was incorporated as a town in 1904. The business section of the town was destroyed in two fires in 1906 and 1911. The town experienced a boom due to its close proximity to the Clay Belt and the silver mines in Cobalt. By 1910, it was a boom town with 12 thousand residents, electric streetcars, and a national hockey team called the Haileybury Comets. Lakeshore Road became known as Millionaire’s Row due to the large number of mansions on it. Those mansions were built by the timber and mining industry barons. The town also had several hotels.

The town experienced several forest fires including the Great Fire of 1922 which had displaced almost three thousand people. From 1912 to 2003, it was the administrative hub of the Timiskaming District. The Haileybury Legion Branch 54 was established in 1926. The first scheduled Air Mail service in Canada took place in 1924 between Haileybury and Rouyn.

Haileybury was merged with New Liskeard and Dymond Township to form Temiskaming Shores in 2004.

=== Economy ===
Whiskeyjack Beer, a craft brewery founded in 2017, began supplying the LCBO in 2020.

Haileybury Beach

The Grant mansion on Lake Temiskaming is the largest home in Canada. In 2023, it was purchased by a Texas businessman who planned to renovate it as part of a reality show called the Mansion Impossible. It was originally built by Peter Grant to showcase products of his company, Grant Forestry Products, which closed after the 2007 great recession.

=== Education ===
The Haileybury School of Mines was established in 1912. It became part of the Northern College in 1960.

The Haileybury Public School was opened in 1925. It was closed in 2016 with the students being transferred to New Liskeard Public School. The property was set to be sold after the closure.
