= New Liskeard =

Community in Temiskaming Shores, Ontario, Canada

New Liskeard is a community and former town on the shore of Lake Timiskaming in the Timiskaming District of northeastern Ontario, Canada. Established in the 1890s at the mouth of the Wabi River, it developed as a service centre for farmers on the fertile Clay Belt. It was incorporated as a town in 1903 and grew further after the arrival of the railway in 1905. In 2004, New Liskeard amalgamated with Dymond and Haileybury to form Temiskaming Shores.

== History ==
=== Early settlement ===
House of John Armstrong

The area was originally home to the Algonquin. Angela Lapointe and Joachim "Clear Sky" Wabigijic also lived there. Irvin Heard and William Murray later settled in the area, followed by John Armstrong, a Crown Lands Agent who came to supervise the settlements along the banks of the Wabi River. Armstrong bought land near the mouth of the river for himself and divided it into residential plots. Another section of the settlement was developed by Kalil "Big Pete" Farah, a Syrian immigrant. Irvin Heard briefly contested the land allocated to John Armstrong before agreeing to land south of the Wabi River belonging to Armstrong.

The settlement, established in 1893, was first named Liskeard after Liskeard, England, Armstrong's birthplace. It was briefly renamed Thornloe, after the Anglican bishop, a name later given to the community of Thornloe north of New Liskeard. The settlement was finally renamed New Liskeard to avoid confusion with Leskard, a hamlet in Durham.

=== Growth and incorporation ===
Farmers arrived to take advantage of the fertile Clay Belt, and by 1896 New Liskeard was a thriving settlement serving the surrounding farm community. That year, Tom McCamus, a druggist, and Angus McKelvie, a teacher, established a sawmill. The settlement's first school opened in 1895 and also served as its church, courthouse and town hall. It was the empty store of Eastman. Mrs James Brown became the first school teacher of the town, teaching six pupils. The first bridge across the Wabi River was built in 1897, and Presbyterian and Anglican churches followed in 1898 and 1899.

A new school opened in 1903 to serve the growing population. That same year, New Liskeard was incorporated as a town, with Armstrong as its first mayor. The town expanded further after the railway arrived in 1905. The New Liskeard Speaker was established in 1906 by E. F. Stephenson and his son A. E. Stephenson. Irvin Heard sold a lot to New Liskeard Agricultural Society which later became the first fair ground of New Liskeard. In the 1930s, livestock and diary became major industries in the town. The town was also home to a several mining companies including The Chester Silver Mining Company Limited.

=== Amalgamation ===
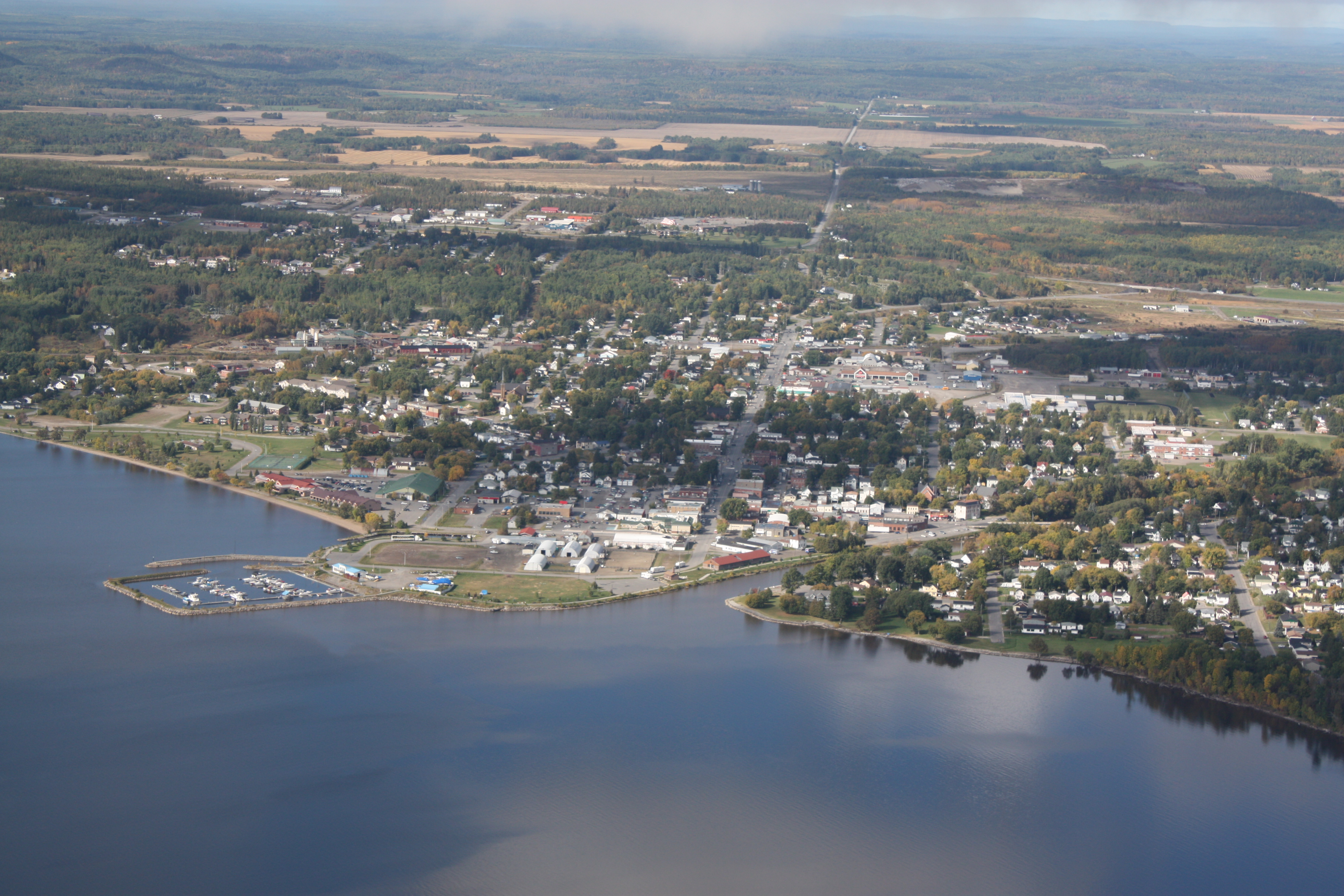
Aerial view of New Liskeard, 2009

In 1962, New Liskeard Speaker combined with the Haileyburian and Cobalt Weekly Post to form the regional newspaper The Temiskaming Speaker. The New Liskeard College of Agricultural Technology closed in 1994, after provincial funding was stopped, with the campus converted into a Beef and Horticulture research station.

In 2004, New Liskeard merged with Dymond Township and Haileybury to form Temiskaming Shores. Danny Whelan, deputy mayor of Temiskaming Shores and had previously served as the Reeve of Dymond Township, stated he would have supported Amalgamation earlier and all three towns have benefited from it through shared resources. According to the 2021 census, New Liskeard had a population of 4,232.
