= Charles Cobbold Farr =

English-born Canadian fur trade employee and founder of Haileybury, Ontario

Charles Cobbold Farr (1851-1914) was an English-born Canadian factor of the Hudson's Bay Company and the founder of Haileybury, Ontario.

== Biography ==
Farr was born in England in 29 May 1851 in Suffolk and immigrated to Canada in 1871. His father was the Reverend John Farr, rector of Gillingham in Norfolk, and mother was Emily Caroline Cobbold. He studied at the Haileybury and Imperial Service College in England.

In 1873, Farr was part of a surveying party in northern Ontario that stopped for a three-week rest at the Hudson's Bay Company trading post at Fort Temiskaming. The visit sparked his interest in the company, and later that year he was offered employment with it as a Factor. He was married and had a daughter by 1880. He had observed scalps from conflict between Inuit of Northern Ontario and Cree.

After learning the business at Fort Temiskaming, Farr was sent to the fur trading fort at Lake Kipawa. He worked for nearly ten years at Kippewa. In 1883, he returned to Fort Temiskaming and worked there until 1889. He is said to have founded a settlement called Beccles that no longer exists.

While working at Fort Temiskaming, Farr purchased land on the west bank of Lake Temiskaming, at the site of present-day Haileybury, Ontario. He named the settlement Haileybury after the Haileybury and Imperial Service College he had attended in England. He has been described as the first settler of Haileybury. The place was called Matabanick which means "place where the trail ends" in the Algonkian language. He created the "The Lake Temiscamingue District" pamphlet to encourage settlers. The town grew rapidly with the arrival of trains and discovery of silver in Cobalt.

Farr died on 25 November 1914.
