= Clay Belt =

Tract of fertile soil in Ontario and Quebec, Canada

Coordinates: 49°00′N 81°00′W

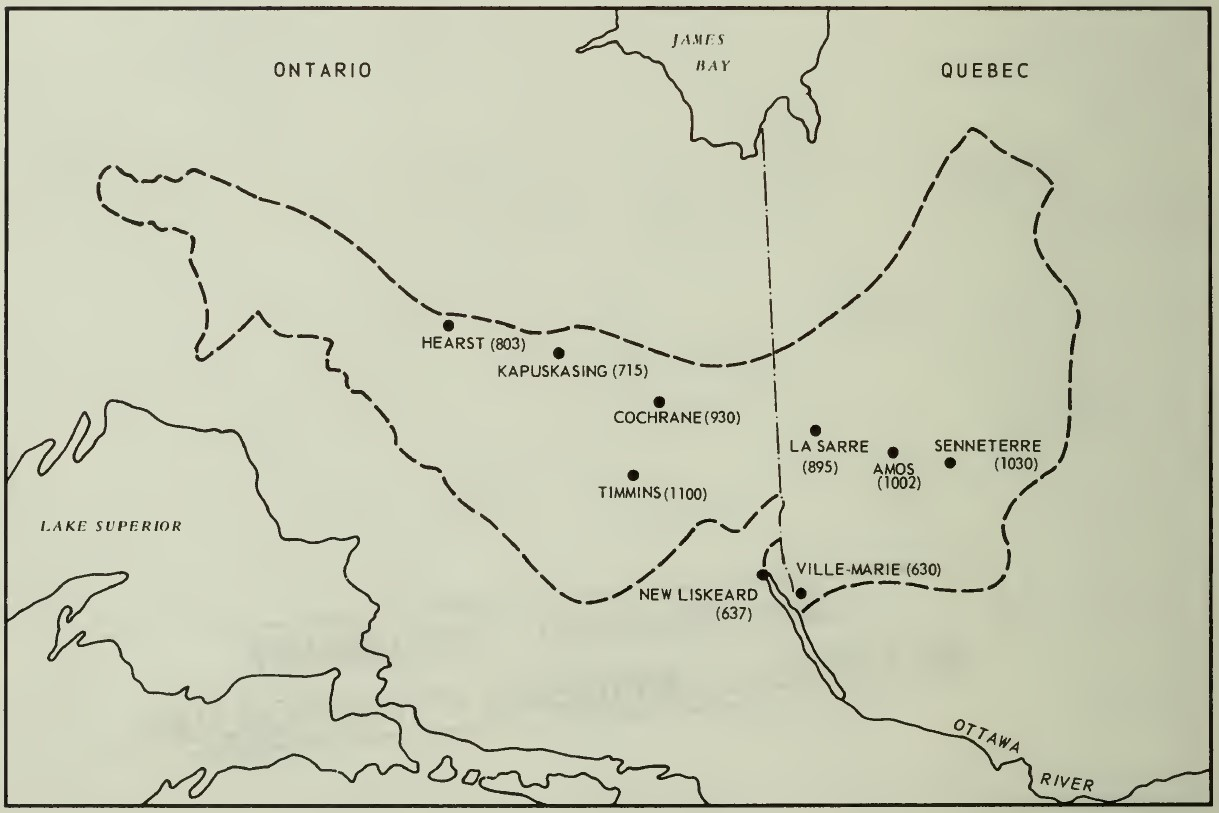
Map of the Clay Belt

The Clay Belt is a vast tract of fertile soil in Canada, stretching across Cochrane District in Ontario and Abitibi-Témiscamingue region in Quebec, covering 180,000 square kilometres (69,000 sq mi) in total with 120,000 square kilometres (46,000 sq mi) in Ontario. It is generally subdivided into the Great Clay Belt to the north running eastward from Kapuskasing, past Lake Abitibi and on to Amos, and the V-shaped Lesser Clay Belt to its south, running from Englehart down to the Wabi River to the northern tip of Lake Timiskaming, and long the eastern side of Timiskaming and back up to Rouyn-Noranda. The Clay Belt is the result of the draining of the glacial Lake Ojibway around 8,200 BP, whose lakebed sediment forms the modern landform. The Clay Belt is surrounded by the Canadian Shield, forming an island of "southern flatlands" in the midst of the hilly and rocky surroundings. Similar glaciolacustrine deposits dot the northern areas of Ontario, Quebec, and Labrador.

== Discovery ==
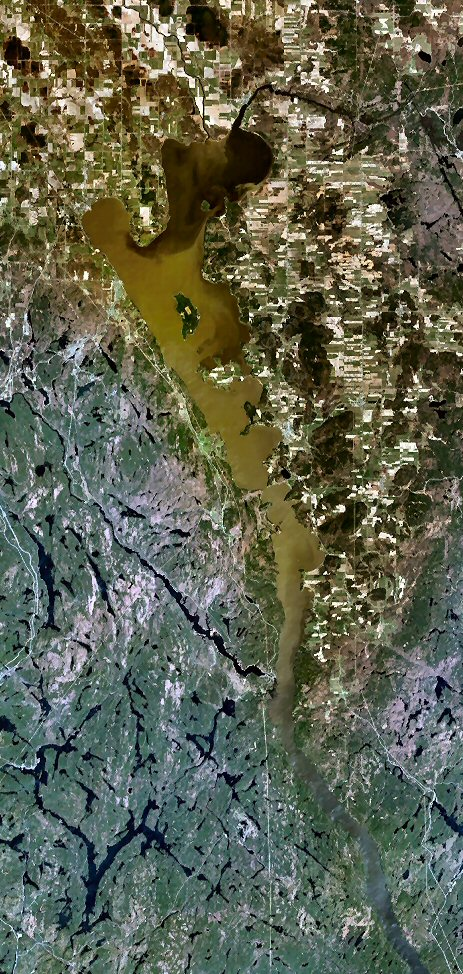
This satellite photo of Lake Timiskaming shows a clear difference in landforms, with the muskeg of the Canadian Shield to the southwest and flatter drained and cleared area of the Lesser Clay Belt to the north and east. The white coloring is snow lying on the flat land, while it is hidden under the fir-covered Shield to the south.

The area was first mapped by Dr. Robert Bell and his assistant Arthur Barlow in 1887, as part of a wider series of surveys in northern Ontario. In 1899, Barlow wrote a report on the geology and natural resources of the area, which suggested that the rich belt of clay that lay north of Lake Temiskaming was ideal for agricultural settlement. The area has a rich clay soil, in contrast to the low fertility of the muskeg and exposed bedrock shield surrounding it. Moreover, the combination of its general fertility, flat topography, high water table and relative accessibility to an extensive network of roads for logging and mining make it suitable for some types of farming. The following year, the government announced plans to develop the area by tapping its natural resources.

Soon after, Bernhard Eduard Fernow traveled the area at the behest of the federal Commission of Conservation, ostensibly to survey the area of the Canadian National Railway transcontinental main line (formerly the Grand Trunk) and the potential for fire. He makes extensive mention of the condition of the timber and has a somewhat tempered view of their potential commercial value. He then moves on to a somewhat more positive report on the soil and its suitability for farming, saying its future is "bright". Wishing to avoid the "Trent watershed" problem, an earlier failed settlement attempt, he suggested setting up an experimental farm to test what "treatment is necessary on the various soils". Such a farm was set up in Kapuskasing on the west side of the river to explore and develop crops and systems for farming the area.

== Promotion ==
The Canadian government encouraged immigrants to settle there as farmers during and after World War I. Governments of the day were mistakenly impressed with the agricultural potential of the Great Clay Belt. Under the Soldier Settlement Act, 1917 (shortly replaced by the Soldier Settlement Act, 1919) the Soldier Settlement Board established the Kapuskasing Soldier Colony to settle veterans that had returned from the Great War. Settlers received homesteads, grants and guaranteed loans and were paid for clearing their own land. However, by 1920 only nine of more than 100 original settlers remained. The farming consisted of some grains (mostly oats) and vegetables.

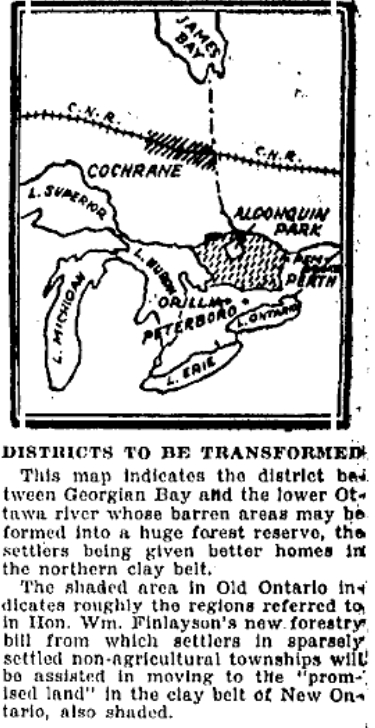
Graphic describing lands affected by The Forestry Act, 1927

The Ontario government also passed legislation in 1927 to enable the migration of farmers from barren lands in older parts of the Province, such as Haliburton County, to areas such as the Lesser Clay Belt through the exchange of land. In spite of numerous rocky outcrops some farming was successfully established within the Great Clay Belt; however, it proved to be impractical because of the short growing season. The clay soil is fertile, but long snowy winters coupled with unpredictable rainfall during the short growing season meant most farming yielded little.

== Decline ==
By 1935, immigration to the Great Clay Belt virtually ended. One farmer, describing why he returned to urban life, stated that, in the Great Clay Belt, "there are seven months of snow, two months rain, and all the rest is black flies and mosquitoes." Some of the farmers returned to Toronto and Montreal. Some moved west to the prairie provinces of Manitoba, Saskatchewan and Alberta once the National Transcontinental Railway was completed. Many of the farmers shifted to mining once minerals were found in the area. Others entered the logging industry. Some towns still remaining today include Cochrane, New Liskeard, Timmins, Kapuskasing, and Hearst.

Neither the Great nor the Lesser Clay Belt seems able to attract any sort of sustainable industry to employ people for long periods of time. Both regions go through periodic boom and bust cycles, depending upon the fortunes of the pulp and paper industries and the mining industries.
