= Lake Timiskaming =

Freshwater lake in Canada

- Lake Temiskaming
- Lac Témiscamingue (French)
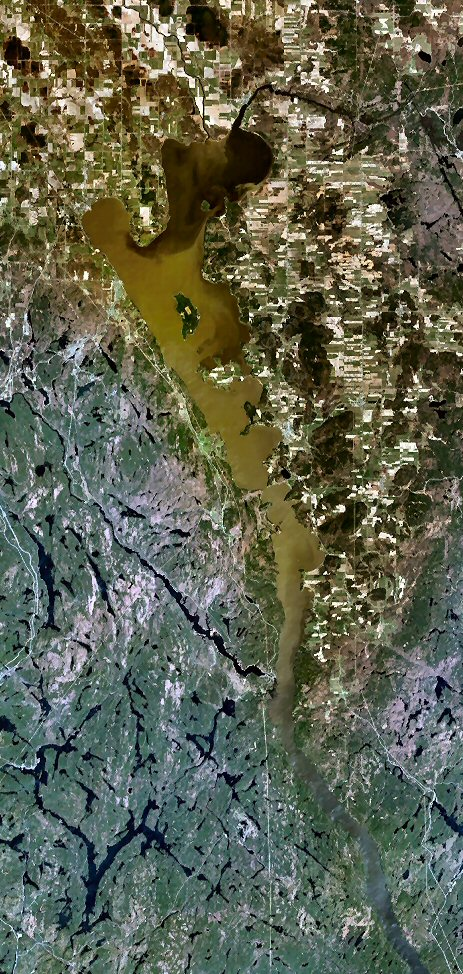

- Location within Ontario
- Location: Timiskaming District / Nipissing District, Ontario and Témiscamingue Regional County Municipality, Quebec
- Coordinates: 47°20′N 79°30′W
- Type: Rift lake
- Primary inflows: Blanche River, Ottawa River, Montreal River, Matabitchuan River
- Primary outflows: Ottawa River
- Basin countries: Canada
- Max. length: 110 km (68 mi)
- Surface area: 304 km^{2} (117 sq mi)
- Average depth: 122 m (400 ft)
- Max. depth: 216 m (709 ft)
- Water volume: 37.09 km^{3} (8.90 cu mi)
- Surface elevation: 178.40 m (585.3 ft)
- Islands: du Collège, Mann Farr Island
- Settlements: Temiskaming Shores Ville-Marie, Quebec Notre-Dame-du-Nord

Lake Timiskaming or Lake Temiskaming (French: Lac Témiscamingue, pronounced [lak temiskamɛ̃ɡ]) is a large freshwater lake on the provincial boundary between Ontario and Quebec, Canada. The lake, which forms part of the Ottawa River, is 110 km (68 mi) in length and covers an area of 304 km^{2} (117 sq mi). Its water level ranges between 175 m (574 ft) and 179 m (587 ft) above sea level, with a mean annual average of 178.4 m (585 ft). The lake is in places up to 216 m (709 ft) deep. There are several islands on the lake, notably Mann and du Collège Islands.

== Description ==
The name is from the Algonquin Temikami or Temikaming, meaning "deep body of water with rapid winds.”

The lake was shaped during the last ice age when glaciers carved into the rock. It is also the remnants of a huge basin called Lake Ojibway, which existed about 9,500 years ago. There are 30 species of fish, the best known are northern pike, lake sturgeon, lake trout, walleye, smallmouth bass, bullhead, carp, burbot, perch, and whitefish.

Fort Témiscamingue was a trading post on the lake. One of Canada's greatest boating tragedies occurred when 12 boys and a staff member of Ted Byfield's St John's School of Claremont died of drowning and hypothermia on a canoe trip on 11 June 1978 on the lake.

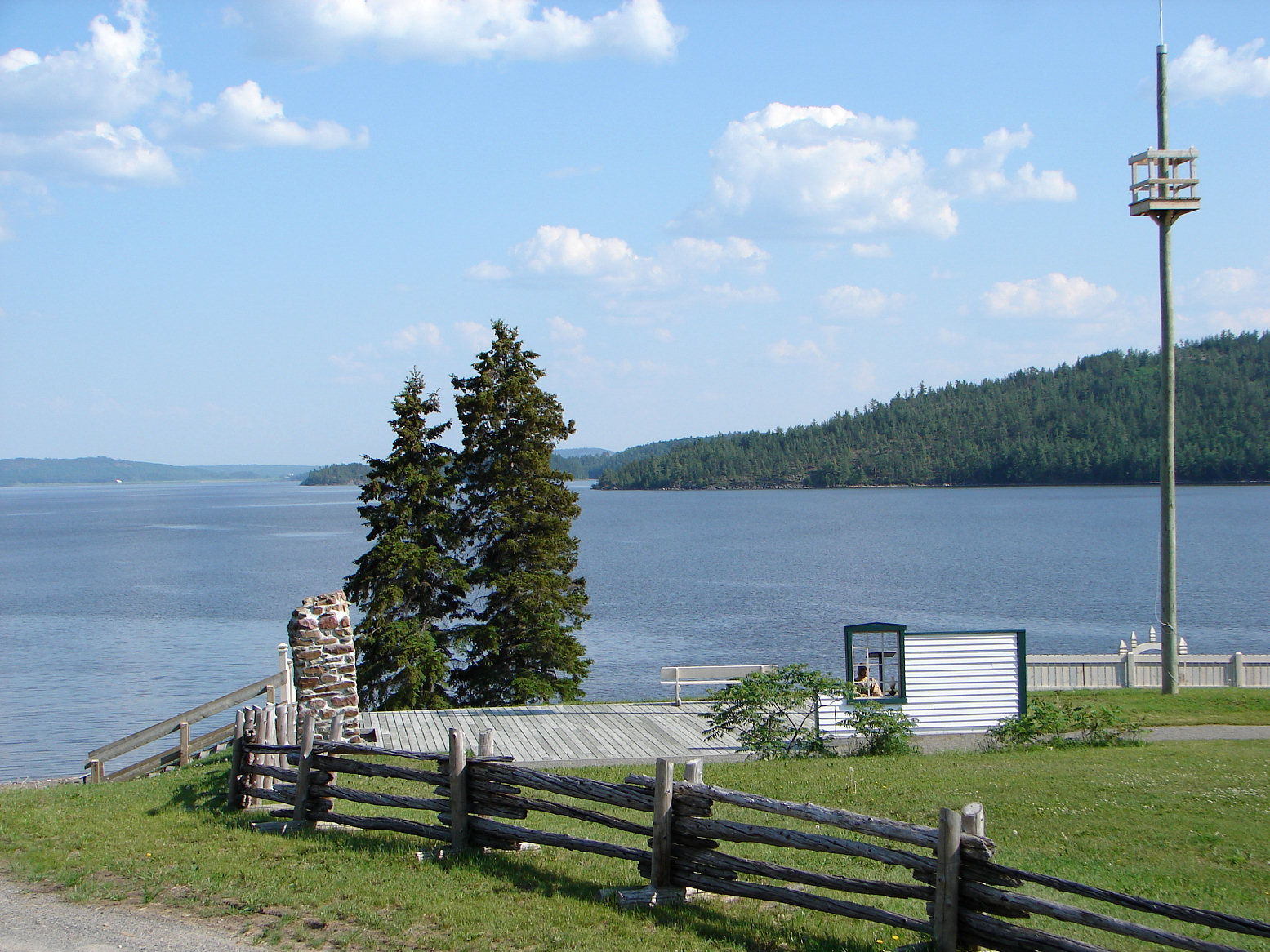
Looking south over Lake Timiskaming from Fort Témiscamingue near Ville-Marie, Quebec.

== Timiskaming Graben ==
Lake Timiskaming is located within the ancient major rift valley Timiskaming Graben. It is the northern extension of the Ottawa-Bonnechere Graben, which is part of the Saint Lawrence rift system.

There have been recent earthquakes along the rift valley, the most recent being in 2000. There are numerous faults in the area and has produced cliffs such as Devil's Rock, just 5 km (3 mi) south of Haileybury and is dated to 2.2 billion years old. There are known kimberlite pipes within the rift valley that are considered to be diamondiferous.

== See also ==
- Mugwump (folklore)
- 1935 Timiskaming earthquake
- 2000 Kipawa earthquake
