= Lake Vermont =

Glacial lake in Vermont, New York and Ontario

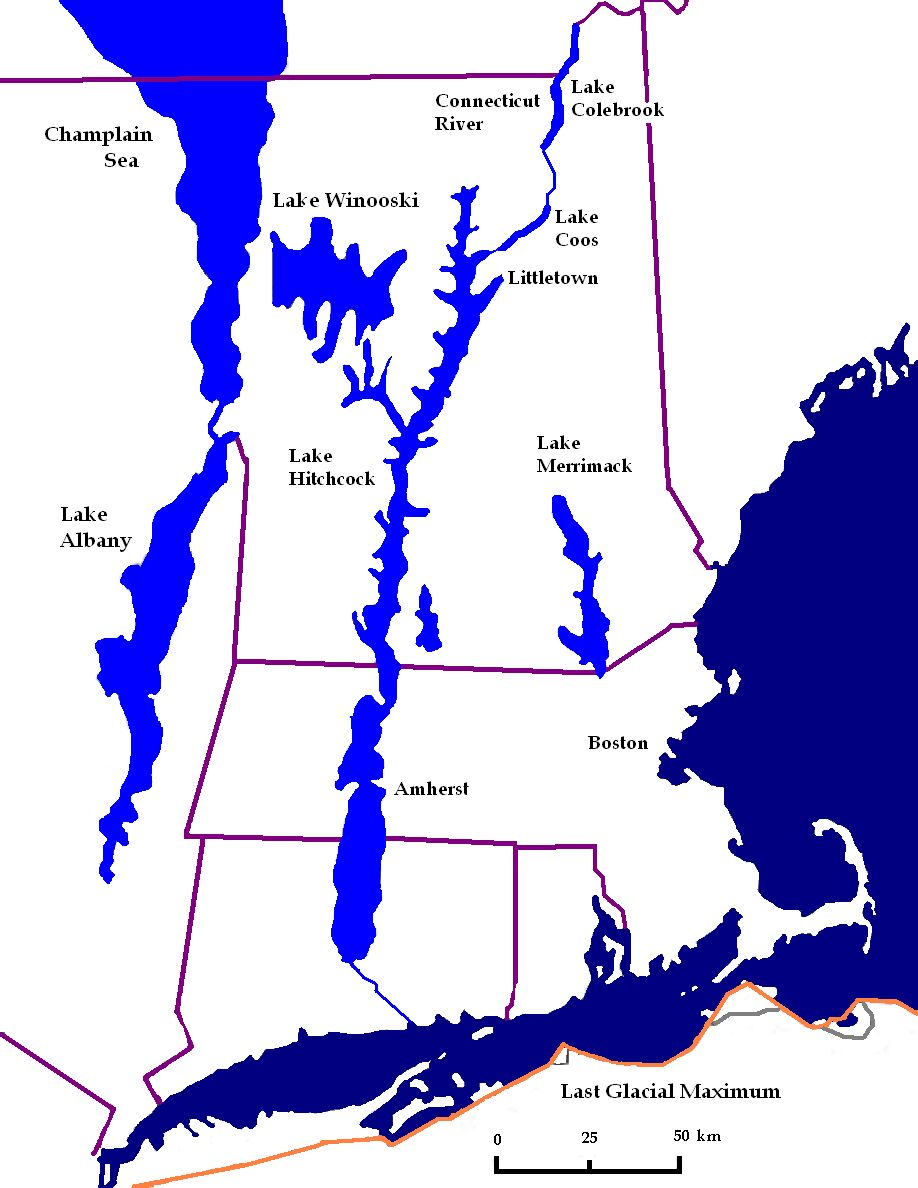
Proglacial and prehistoric lakes of New England during the end of the Wisconsin Glacial Epoch of the Pleistocene Era. Lake Vermont covers the area of the Champlain Sea, prior to its opening to the North Atlantic.

Lake Vermont, also called Glacial Lake Vermont, was a temporary lake created by the retreating glaciers during the close of the last ice age. The lake once included land in the Canadian province of Quebec and the American states Vermont and New York. It was a geologic predecessor of Lake Champlain. Once the glacier retreated far enough north, it drained into Glacial Lake Candona, a geologic predecessor of the St. Lawrence River.

At one time, Lake Vermont may have reached nearly as far south as to what is now Albany, New York. The surface of the lake was about 500 feet (150 m) above present day Lake Champlain, and was up to 900 feet (270 m) deep. The lake contained muddy water, and the sediment of Lake Vermont contains silt/clay varves, with silt being deposited during summer and clay during the less-energetic flow of winter.

The Laurentide Ice Sheet retreated north of what is now Burlington, Vermont, about 13,500 years ago, marking the beginning of Lake Vermont. The ice damming the water at the north end, at what is now Warwick, Quebec, failed catastrophically about 12,000 years ago. The lake dropped 300 feet (91 m) within hours or days. Eventually, when the glacier retreated far enough north, salt water swept in, replacing the larger, freshwater Lake Vermont with the smaller, saltwater Champlain Sea.

== See also ==
- Lake Albany
- Lake Hitchcock
- Lake Merrimack
- Lake Stowe
