= Geology of New Hampshire =

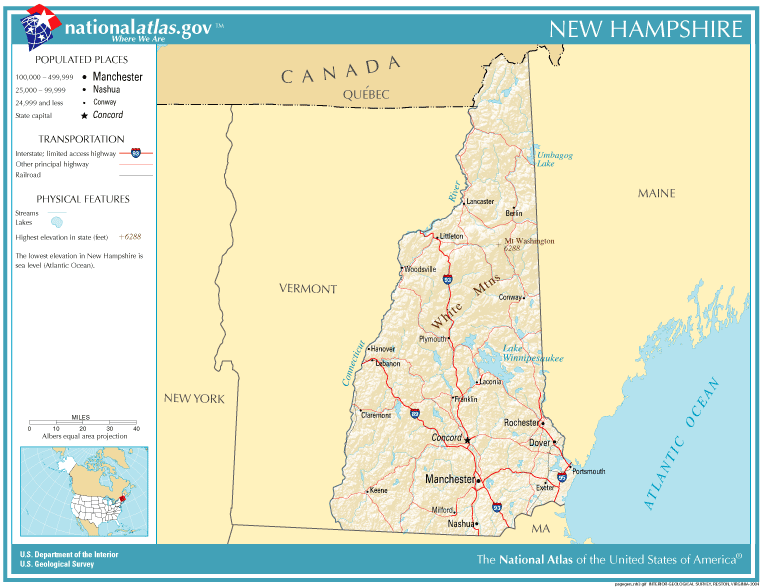
New Hampshire, showing roads, rivers and major cities

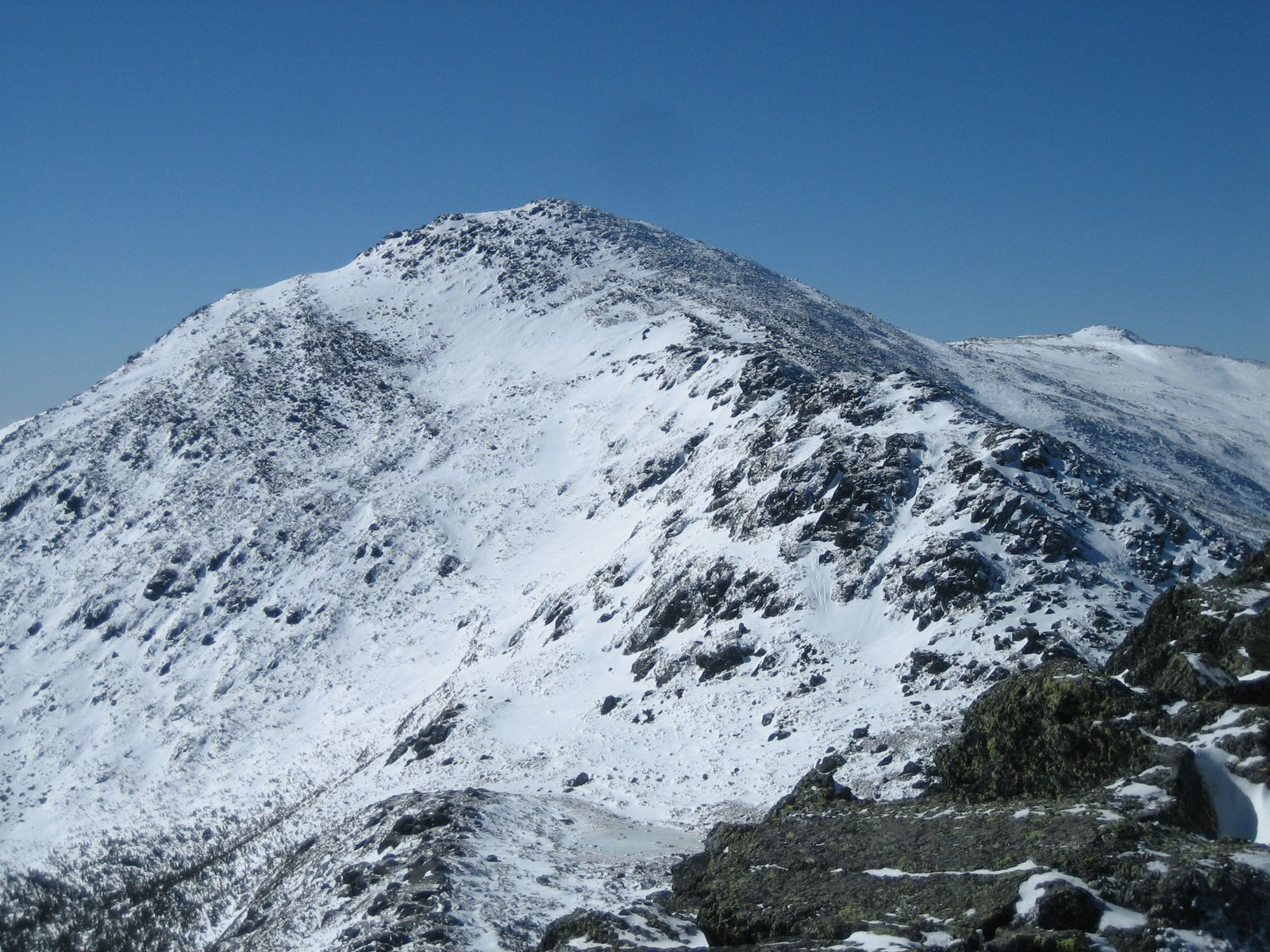
Mount Adams (5,774 ft or 1,760 m) is part of New Hampshire's Presidential Range.

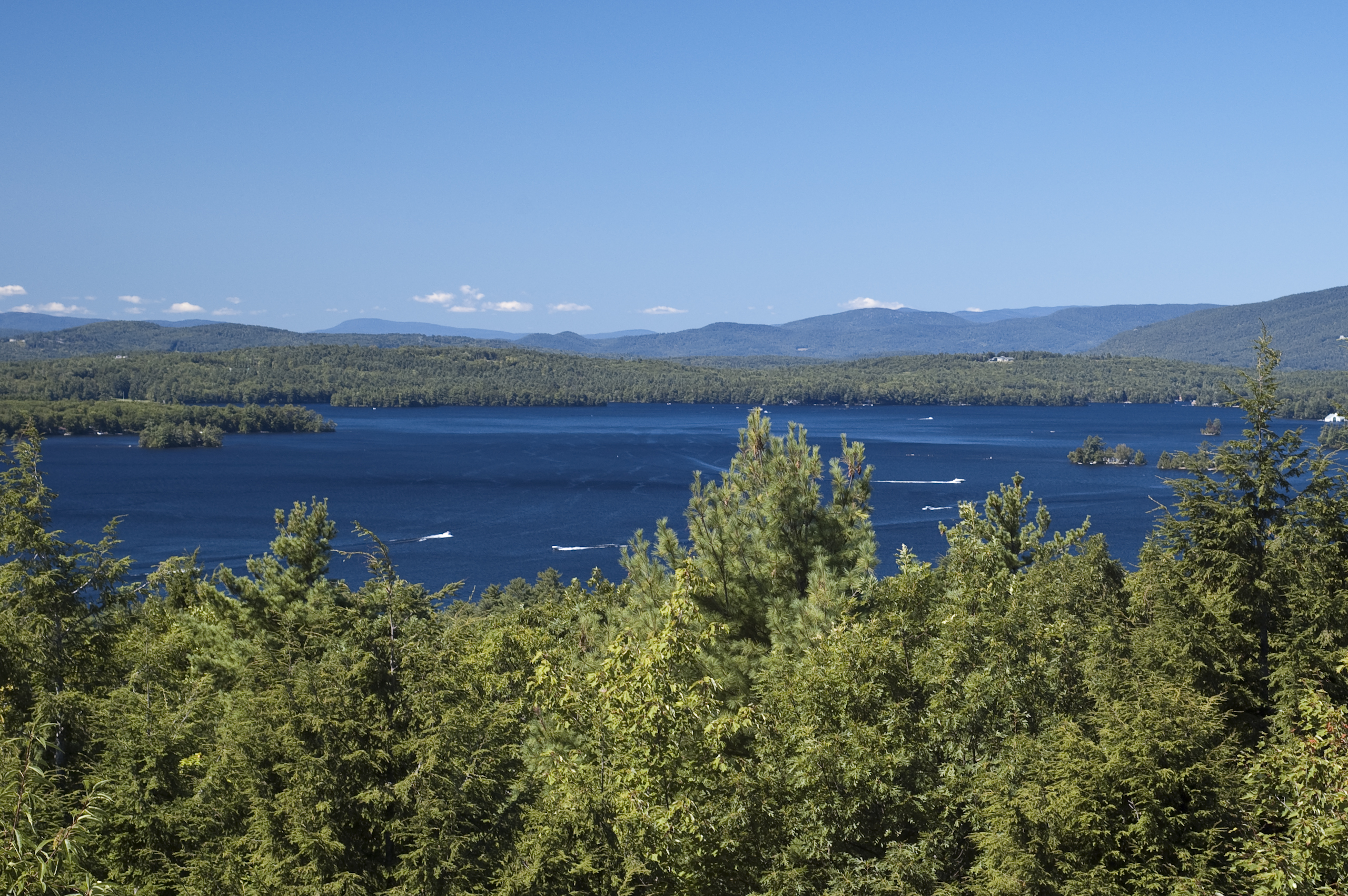
Lake Winnipesaukee and the Ossipee Mountains

The geology of New Hampshire is similar to that of the rest of New England in comprising a series of metamorphosed sedimentary and volcanic rocks of Late Proterozoic to Devonian age, intruded by many plutons and dikes ranging in age from Late Proterozoic to early Cretaceous. New Hampshire is known as "the Granite State", but less than half is underlain by granite; much of it is schist or gneiss, both of which are metamorphic rocks.

== Geological structure ==
The state straddles three composite tectonostratigraphic terranes. The larger part of the state lies on the Central Maine composite terrane, comprising the Central Maine trough in the east and the Bronson Hill mantled gneiss domes in the west. A small area of the first composite terrane belongs to the Hurricane Mountain belt and olistostrome belt. The northernmost corner of the state lies in the Connecticut Valley trough of the Boundary Mountains composite terrane. In the coastal region in the southeast is the Merrimack–Orrington Belt of the Nashoba–Casco–Miramichi composite terrane.

== Geography ==
The state is bounded by Quebec, Canada, to the north and northwest; Maine and the Atlantic Ocean to the east; Massachusetts to the south; and Vermont to the west. New Hampshire's major regions are the Great North Woods, the White Mountains, the Lakes Region, the Seacoast, the Merrimack Valley, the Monadnock Region, and the Dartmouth-Lake Sunapee area. New Hampshire has the shortest ocean coastline of any U.S. coastal state, with a length of 18 miles (29 km), sometimes measured as only 13 miles (21 km). New Hampshire was home to the rock formation called the Old Man of the Mountain, a face-like profile in Franconia Notch, until the formation disintegrated in May 2003.

The White Mountains in New Hampshire span the north-central portion of the state, with the summit of Mount Washington the highest point in the northeastern United States.

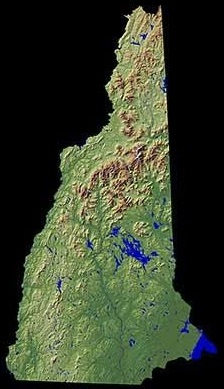
Shaded relief map of New Hampshire

In the southwest corner of New Hampshire, the landmark Mount Monadnock has given its name to a class of earth-forms – a monadnock – signifying, in geomorphology, any isolated resistant peak rising from a less resistant eroded plain.

Major rivers include the 110-mile (177 km) Merrimack River, which bisects the lower half of the state north-south and reaches the Atlantic Ocean in Newburyport, Massachusetts. Its New Hampshire tributaries include the Contoocook River, Pemigewasset River, and Winnipesaukee River. The 410-mile (660 km) Connecticut River, which starts at New Hampshire's Connecticut Lakes and flows south to Connecticut, defines the western border with Vermont. The state border is not in the center of that river, as is usually the case, but at the low-water mark on the Vermont side; meaning that the entire river along the Vermont border (save for areas where the water level has been raised by a dam) lies within New Hampshire. Only one town – Pittsburg – shares a land border with the state of Vermont. The "northwesternmost headwaters" of the Connecticut, now known as Halls Stream, define Canada's border with New Hampshire.

The Piscataqua River forms the state's only significant ocean port where it flows into the Atlantic at Portsmouth. The Salmon Falls River and the Piscataqua define the southern portion of the border with Maine. The largest of New Hampshire's lakes is Lake Winnipesaukee, which covers 71 square miles (184 km^{2}) in the east-central part of New Hampshire. Umbagog Lake along the Maine border, approximately 12.3 square miles (31.9 km^{2}), is a distant second. Squam Lake is the second largest lake entirely in New Hampshire.

New Hampshire has the shortest ocean coastline of any state in the United States, approximately 18 miles (29 km) long. About 7 miles (11 km) offshore are the Isles of Shoals, nine small islands (four in New Hampshire and five in Maine).

== Earthquakes ==
While New Hampshire, along with the rest of New England, does not frequently experience earthquakes, it has experienced several in history and has been affected by some of the larger events that were centered in the Saint Lawrence rift system in Canada. One of these was the 1663 Charlevoix earthquake that was centered near the Quebec–Maine border, the magnitude of which has since been estimated at 7.3 to 7.9. In 1727, Newbury, Massachusetts, experienced a damaging earthquake that shook New Hampshire also. The 1755 Cape Ann earthquake, estimated magnitude 5.5–6.0, also shook most or all of New Hampshire. On November 9, 1810, Exeter experienced an estimated intensity VI (Strong) tremor. It was accompanied by an unusual noise like an explosion, and broke windows in Portsmouth. Concord, the capital, experienced a series of shocks between 1872 and 1891. One earthquake was felt in late 1872, lasting ten seconds in Concord, and was felt in Laconia and other towns to the north. Ten years later, another tremor was strongest in Concord, although Dover and Pittsfield reportedly had buildings shaken. On November 23, 1884, a light shock was followed fifteen minutes later by a severe earthquake in Concord. The second shock was felt in Massachusetts, Connecticut, and eastern New York. Concord's last tremor in that period was mild and was reported in Cambridge and Melrose, Massachusetts.

Southeastern New Hampshire and Maine experienced an earthquake in 1925. Dishes and goods were jostled from shelves in Ossipee, Tuftonboro, and Effingham Falls. In 1929 the Grand Banks of Newfoundland (800 miles (1,300 km) to the east) experienced a magnitude 7.2 earthquake, and New Hampshire felt minor effects. In 1935, a 6.25 earthquake centered in Timiskaming, Ontario, 500 miles (800 km) away, was felt in an area of over 2,500,000 square kilometers (970,000 mi^{2}), and some places in New Hampshire experienced Mercalli intensities as high as V (Moderate). Ossipee Lake was the site of two moderate earthquakes in December 1940. The quakes were felt in all six New England states, as well as parts of New Jersey and Pennsylvania. In the epicentral area, a large number of aftershocks happened. One observer counted over 120 aftershocks through January 31, 1941.

== See also ==
- Geology of New England
