= 1870 Charlevoix earthquake =

Earthquake affecting Quebec, Canada

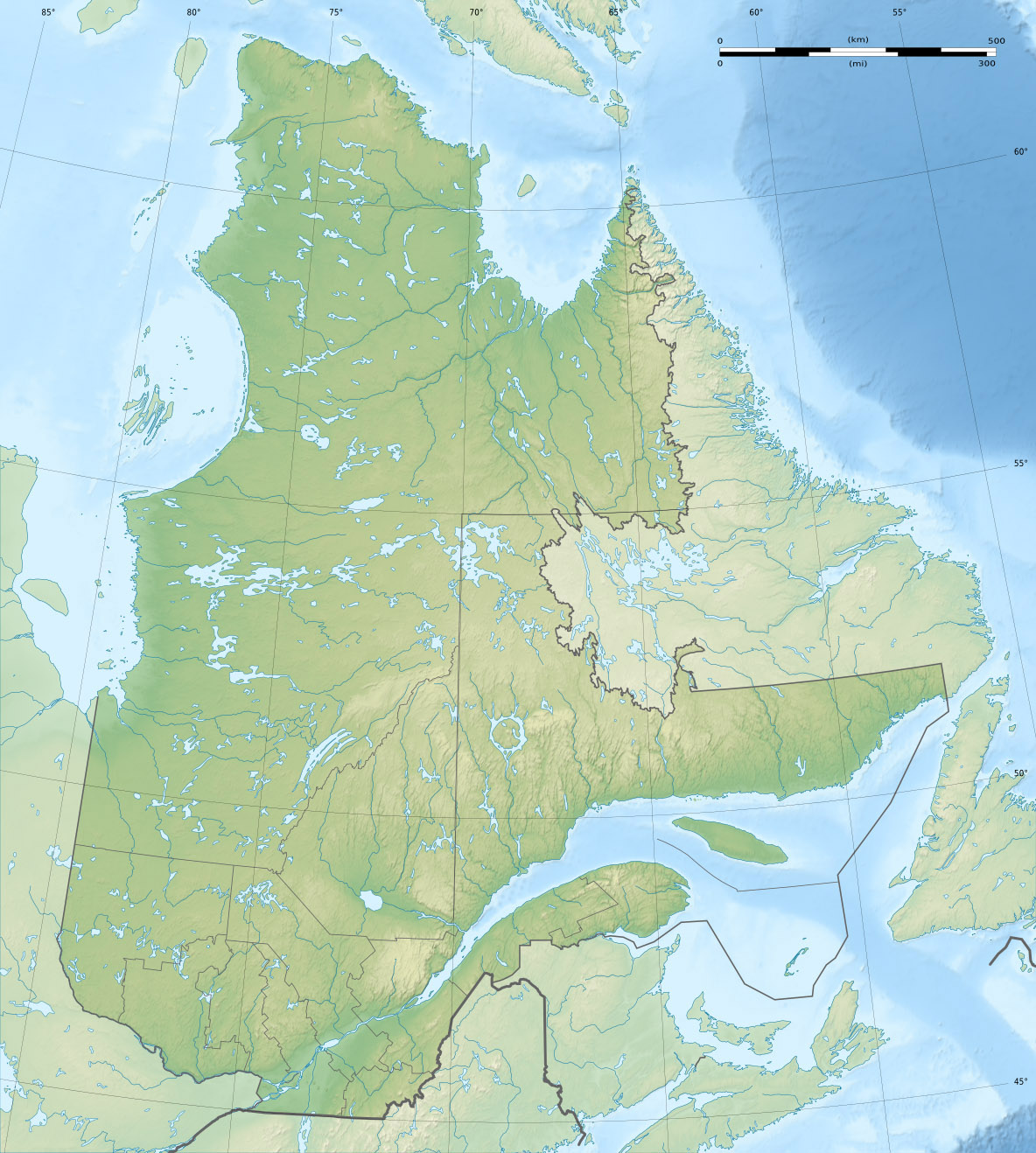
- Location within Quebec Location within Canada
- USGS-ANSS: ComCat
- Local date: October 20, 1870
- Local time: 16:30
- Magnitude: 6.6 M_{w} M_{I} 5.5–6.0
- Epicenter: 47.4°N 70.5°W
- Areas affected: Canada, United States
- Max. intensity: MMI X (Extreme)
- Casualties: 6 dead

The 1870 Charlevoix earthquake occurred on 20 October in the Canadian province of Quebec. It had a moment magnitude of 6.6 M_{w} and a Modified Mercalli intensity rating of X (Extreme). The town of Baie-Saint-Paul was seriously damaged by the event, with the loss of six lives. Effects from the earthquake were felt as far as Virginia and along the New England coast of the United States.

== Tectonic setting ==
The Charlevoix Seismic Zone (CSZ) lies along the St. Lawrence River, northeast of Quebec City. Although eastern Canada has relatively infrequent earthquakes, due to its location away from active plate boundaries, the CSZ is its most active part, with five earthquakes of an estimated magnitude of 6 or greater since historical records began. Focal mechanisms for earthquakes in this zone are consistent with rupture on both reverse and strike-slip faults. The main structures of the area are faults of the Saint Lawrence rift system that run parallel to the river, formed during the break-up of the supercontinent Rodinia in the late Neoproterozoic and early Paleozoic. The greatest seismicity occurs where the rift is overprinted by a ~300 Ma meteorite impact structure, the Charlevoix impact structure. Most CSZ earthquakes have hypocenters within the Grenvillian basement at depths between 7 and 15 km. Many of the smaller earthquakes do not appear to be located on the rift faults but within the volumes of rock between them. Larger events lie outside the impact structure and have inferred nodal planes consistent with reactivation of the rift faults. The relatively weak impact structure is interpreted to cause a perturbation of the regional stress field, affecting the stability of the rift faults. The estimated length of the most active portion of the CSZ is 73 kilometres (45 mi). The total fault area is determined to be 73 km × 25 km (45 mi × 16 mi).

== Earthquake ==
The shallow-focus earthquake had an epicenter around the Saint Lawrence River. Its epicenter has been suggested to be in the southwestern end of the CSZ. A maximum Mercalli intensity of IX–X (Violent–Extreme) was assigned to Baie-Saint-Paul. In Quebec City, the intensity is estimated at VI (Strong). In Old Montreal, strong to damaging (VI–VII) levels of shaking was observed. Researcher John E. Ebel and others calculated the intensity magnitude of the earthquake at M_{I} 5.5–6.0, with M_{I} 5.8 being the best estimate. Meanwhile, the Geological Survey of Canada and U.S. Geological Survey earthquake catalogs placed the moment magnitude at 6.6 M_{w}.

== Damage ==
Two children lost their lives in the Les Éboulements municipality in Capitale-Nationale. Four additional deaths were attributed to a landslide five days later. Despite the size and intensity of the quake, few deaths occurred due to the sparse population during the time of the quake. Liquefaction occurred in the affected area. A landslide may have also occurred in the Saguenay River. Many homes in Les Éboulements were destroyed. Saint-Roch was severely damaged by the quake as well. Many chimneys were damaged in Lower Quebec City.

In Portland, Maine, the windows of buildings shattered. A rumbling sound was heard at Albany, New York, which lasted up to a minute. Clocks stopped in Cleveland, Ohio. Reports of the earthquake's effects in Dubuque, Iowa and Richmond, Virginia have been taken with skepticism.

== See also ==
- List of earthquakes in Canada
- List of earthquakes in the United States
- 1663 Charlevoix earthquake
- Charlevoix Seismic Zone
