= Timiskaming Graben =

Northwesterly extension of the Ottawa-Bonnechere Graben

Coordinates: 47°40′N 80°00′W

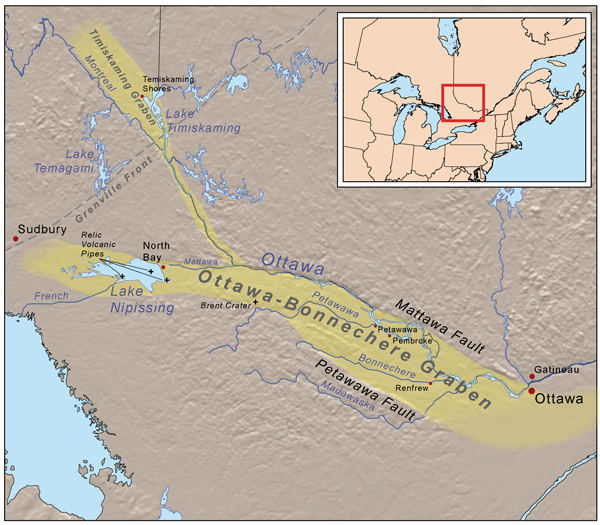
Map of the Ottawa-Bonnechere and Timiskaming grabens

The Timiskaming Graben is a 400 km (250 mi) long and 50 km (31 mi) wide depression straddling the Ontario–Quebec border in Eastern Canada. It is a northwesterly extension of the Ottawa-Bonnechere Graben, a failed arm of the Saint Lawrence rift system which is related to the opening of the Iapetus Ocean.

Formation of the Timiskaming Graben corresponded with collapse of the regional crust along the Quinze Dam and Cross Lake faults possibly as early as 2.4 billion years ago. It was then reactivated during periods of crustal extension related to the breakups of supercontinents Rodinia and Pangaea and during compression related to the various orogenies that formed the Appalachian Mountains. The Timiskaming Graben is now partially filled by Lake Timiskaming, a 100 km (62 mi) long successor to the much larger glacial Lake Barlow which drained at the end of the last glacial period about 8,000 years ago.

The Timiskaming Graben is a seismically active structure in the Western Quebec Seismic Zone. Reactivation of faults has resulted in earthquakes, such as the 1935 Timiskaming earthquake.
