= Charlevoix =

Region of Quebec, Canada

- Region
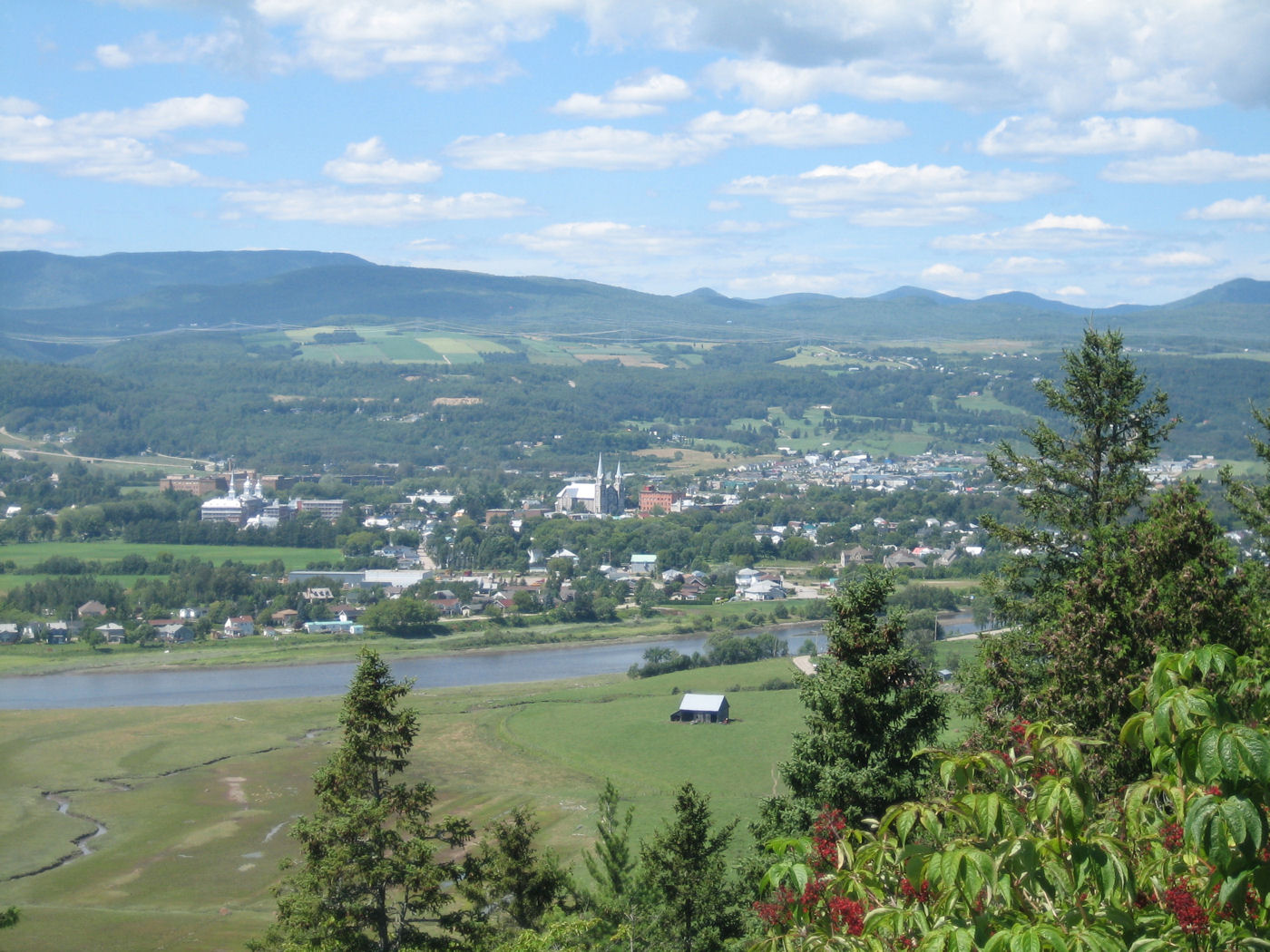
- Looking north across the hills of Charlevoix from Baie-Saint-Paul

- Location within Quebec Location within Canada
- Country: Canada
- Province: Quebec
- Administrative region: Capitale-Nationale
- Major settlements: List: La Malbaie; Baie-Saint-Paul; Clermont; Saint-Urbain; Les Éboulements; Saint-Siméon; L'Isle-aux-Coudres; Saint-Hilarion; Saint-Aimé-des-Lacs
- Time zone: UTC−05:00 (EST)
  - Summer (DST): UTC−04:00 (EDT)
- Postal code prefixes: G

Charlevoix (/ˈʃɑːrləvwɑː/ SHAR-lə-vwah, French: [ʃaʁləvwa]) is a cultural and natural region in Quebec, on the north shore of the Saint Lawrence River as well as in the Laurentian Mountains area of the Canadian Shield. This dramatic landscape includes rolling terrain, fjords, headlands, and bays; the region was designated a World Biosphere Reserve by UNESCO in 1989. Administratively, it comprises the Charlevoix and Charlevoix-Est regional county municipalities within the larger Capitale-Nationale administrative region.

== History ==
The region was named after Pierre François-Xavier de Charlevoix, a French Jesuit explorer and historian who travelled through the area in the 18th century. The community of La Malbaie was known as the first resort area in Canada. As early as 1760, Scottish noblemen Malcolm Fraser and John Nairne hosted visitors at their manors. For much of its history, Charlevoix was home to a thriving summer colony of wealthy Americans, including President William Howard Taft.

== Geography ==
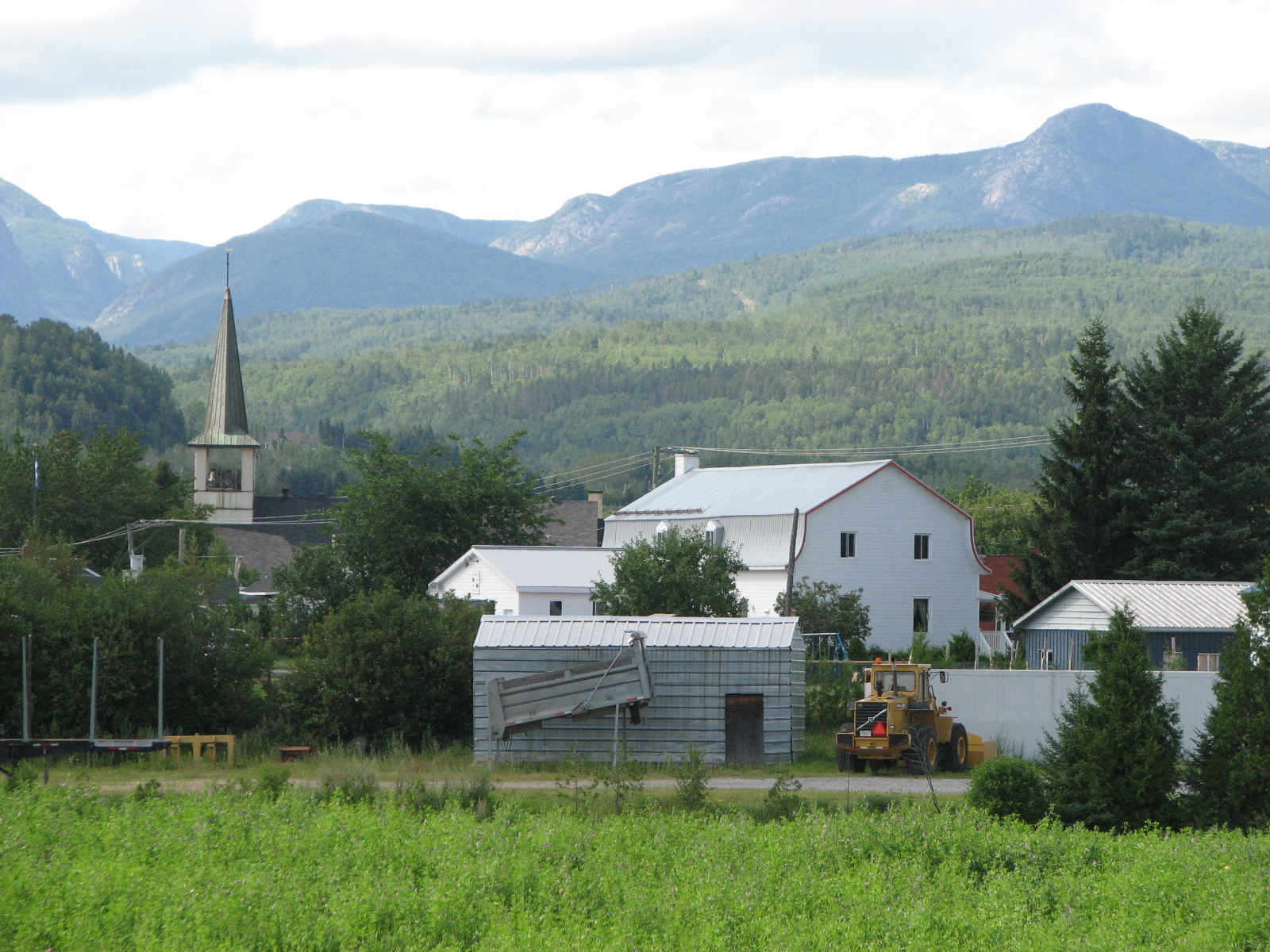
Charlevoix is known for its hilly landscape.

From an administrative point of view, the "Charlevoix region" does not exist in itself, but is rather made up of the regional county municipalities of Charlevoix-Est and Charlevoix.

Features of note include:

- Baie-Saint-Paul, an important arts centre
- Le Domaine Forget music festival and academy
- Île aux Coudres
- the Parc des Grands-Jardins
- the Haute-Gorges de la Rivière Malbaie
- the Manoir Richelieu and the Casino de Charlevoix
- the fjord of the Saguenay River
- the Commission scolaire de Charlevoix
- the Museum of Charlevoix

== Natural history ==
The topography of this region was dramatically altered by a meteorite impact that occurred 350 million years ago creating the Charlevoix impact structure:

The impact created the forty-mile-wide crater that is the heart of Quebec's Charlevoix region, ranging from just west of Baie-Saint-Paul to just east of La Malbaie. Today, the area inside the crater is home to 90 percent of Charlevoix residents and is a very pastoral setting by comparison to what it could have been.

This area was subsequently reshaped by glaciation during the last ice age.

There have been several major earthquakes in the region in recorded history:

- on February 5, 1663, centred south of La Malbaie. See 1663 Charlevoix earthquake.
- on December 6, 1791, centred near Baie-Saint-Paul
- on October 17, 1860, centred under the Saint Lawrence River
- on October 20, 1870, centred near Baie-Saint-Paul. See 1870 Charlevoix earthquake
- on February 28, 1925, centred under the Saint Lawrence River. See 1925 Charlevoix–Kamouraska earthquake.

== Ecological characteristics ==
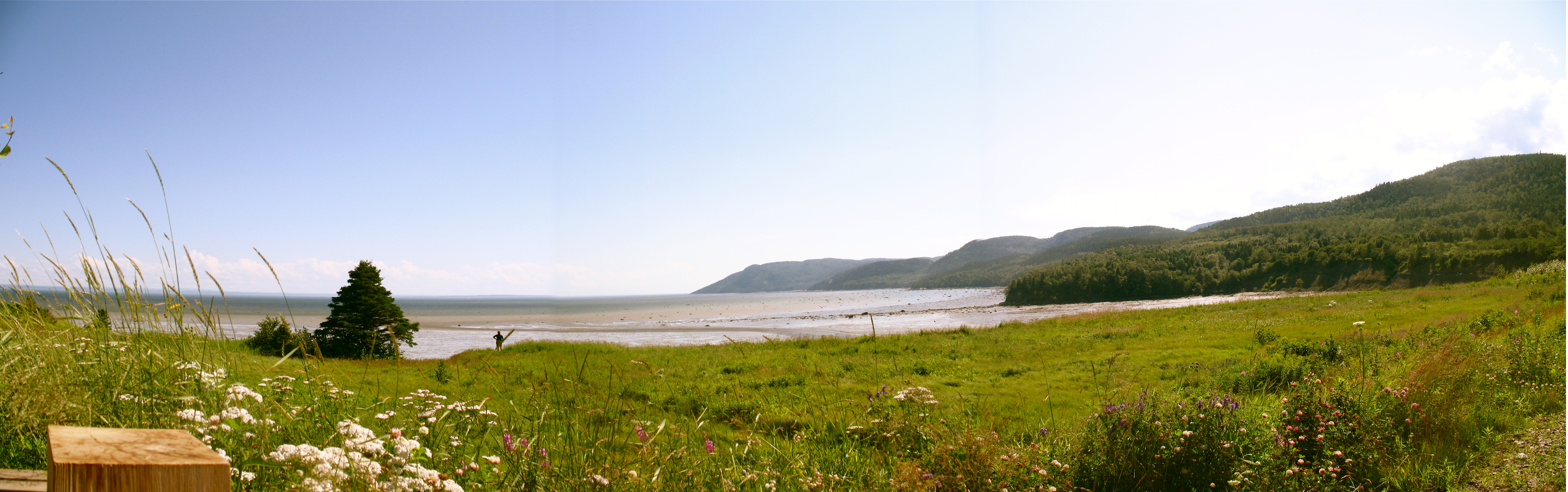
Landscape just outside Tadoussac

Situated some 80 km (50 mi) east of Quebec City, Charlevoix Biosphere Reserve borders the Saint Lawrence River to the south. Extending from 5 m (16 ft) to 1,150 m (3,770 ft) above sea level, the area comprises agricultural areas, river ecosystems, estuarine tidal marshes and flats, coniferous and mixed forests, stunted vegetation (krummholz) and mountain tundra ecosystems.

Maple forests including paper birch (Betula papyriferae), alder (Alnus spp.) and elm (Ulmus spp.) and with an understory of sumac (Rhus typhina), Acer pensylvanicum and Cornus alternifolia; mixed fir (Abies sp.) forest with Corylus cornuta, Sambucus pubens and Taxus canadensis; boreal forests up to an altitude of 300 metres with fir and spruce (Picea spp.); estuarine tidal marsh and flats dominated by Scirpus americanus meadows including Zizania palustris, Sagittaria cuneata and S. latifolia; tundra with ericaceous zones consisting of Kalmia spp., Ledum groenlandicum; stunted vegetation community (krummholz) with Picea mariana and Abies balsamea; agro-ecosystems with cereals, fruits and legumes, and river ecosystems.

Animal species in the area include beluga whale (Delphinapterus leucas), wolf (Canis lupus), boreal woodland caribou (Rangifer tarandus caribou), North American cougar (Puma concolor couguar) and blue whale (Balaenoptera musculus).

== Socio-economic characteristics ==
About 30,000 people live in the biosphere reserve (1988), which covers 157,000 hectares (390,000 acres). In former times, the population of Charlevoix used to rely on the river and the sea, for example on coastal navigation, marine constructions and fisheries (e.g. beluga, eel).

Today, the economic landscape has diversified and major factors in the local economy are now forestry, silica mining, agriculture and tourism. The forest education centre ‘Les Palissades’ or the ecological centre ‘Port-au-Saumon’ are important institutions for environmental education in the area.

=== Transportation ===
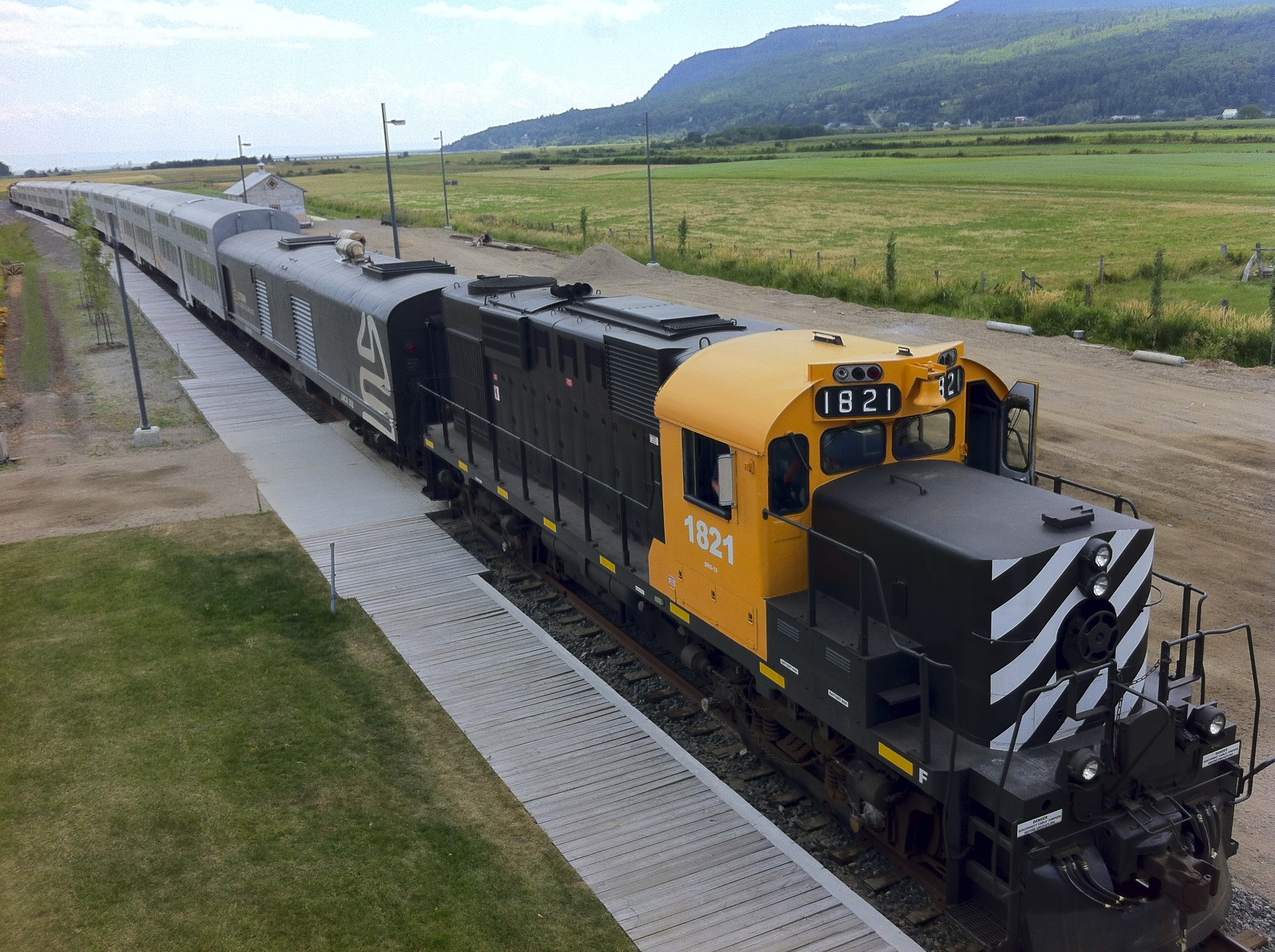
The Train de Charlevoix taking on passengers at Baie-Saint-Paul station in August 2012

Quebec Route 138 is the major highway through the region, which closely follows the shoreline of the Saint Lawrence River. Between Baie-Saint-Paul and La Malbaie, the highway turns inland with Quebec Route 362 serving the riverside communities of Les Éboulements and Saint-Irénée.

The Train de Charlevoix, a tourist rail service, linked the coastal communities of Charlevoix to Quebec City, from 2008 to 2024.

Charlevoix Airport is a small regional airport serving the region.

== See also ==
- Charlevoix (federal electoral district)
- List of earthquakes in Canada
- List of Quebec regions

== Sources ==
This article incorporates text from a free content work. Licensed under CC-BY-SA IGO 3.0 (license statement/permission). Text taken from Charlevoix Biosphere Reserve, UNESCO.
