= 2000 Kipawa earthquake =

Earthquake in Canada

- Location within Canada
- UTC time: 2000-01-01 11:22:57
- ISC event: 1725231
- USGS-ANSS: ComCat
- Local date: January 1, 2000
- Local time: 6:22 am
- Magnitude: 5.2 m_{N}
- Depth: Approx. 14 km (9 mi)
- Epicenter: 46.84°N 78.92°W
- Areas affected: Canada
- Max. intensity: MMI VI (Strong)

The 2000 Kipawa earthquake (or 2000 Kipawa "Millennium" earthquake) struck Quebec and Ontario, Canada with a body wave magnitude of 5.2 at 6:22 a.m. on January 1. It occurred in the Western Quebec seismic zone. The main shock epicenter was located in Lake Kipawa about 10 km (6 mi) north of Témiscaming in southwestern Quebec and 70 km (43 mi) northeast of North Bay, Ontario. The shaking was strongest within 50 km (31 mi) of the epicenter. It was felt in Témiscaming, North Bay and as far away as Toronto, making it one of the most significant earthquakes in Canada in 2000. The earthquake was triggered by major thrust faults associated with the Ottawa-Bonnechere Graben.

Minor damage was reported during this earthquake, including fallen light objects, a damaged ventilation pipe and fractures in plaster. Its epicenter was very close to that of the 1935 Timiskaming earthquake and lies in a group of 76 located earthquakes since 1935. Seventeen aftershocks were recorded.

== See also ==
- List of earthquakes in 2000
- List of earthquakes in Canada
