= 1918 Vancouver Island earthquake =

Earthquake in Canada

- Location within British Columbia
- UTC time: 1918-12-06 08:41:07
- ISC event: 913365
- USGS-ANSS: ComCat
- Local date: December 6, 1918
- Local time: 12:41 a.m. PST
- Magnitude: 7.2 M_{w}
- Depth: 30 kilometers (19 mi)
- Epicenter: 49.44°N 126.22°W
- Type: Strike-slip
- Areas affected: British Columbia; Canada
- Max. intensity: MMI VII (Very strong)

The 1918 Vancouver Island earthquake occurred in British Columbia, Canada at 12:41 a.m. Pacific Standard Time on December 6. The earthquake was most likely of the strike-slip type, and was estimated to have a maximum perceived intensity of VII (Very strong) on the Mercalli intensity scale. The epicenter was located east of the Stewardson inlet on the west coast of Vancouver Island, with damage occurring at the Estevan Point lighthouse on the Hesquiat Peninsula. The event registered 7.2 on the moment magnitude scale and was felt as far as northern Washington state and the interior of British Columbia.

The earthquake took place in the vicinity of the Cascadia subduction zone where the Juan de Fuca plate and the Explorer plate are being subducted under the North American plate at a rate of 4 centimeters (1.6 in) and less than 2 centimeters (0.79 in) per year respectively, but the event was a crustal intraplate earthquake and was produced from the complicated interaction between the plates in the area. The source of the earthquake was the Nootka transform fault, which separates the Juan de Fuca and Explorer plates and has been the origin of at least five additional moderate to large events since 1918.

== See also ==
- List of earthquakes in 1918
- List of earthquakes in Canada
- 1946 Vancouver Island earthquake
