= 1988 Saguenay earthquake =

Earthquake in Quebec, Canada

- Location within Quebec
- UTC time: 1988-11-25 23:46:04
- ISC event: 421305
- USGS-ANSS: ComCat
- Local date: November 25, 1988
- Local time: 18:46:04 EST
- Magnitude: 5.9 M_{w}
- Depth: 29 km (18 mi)
- Epicenter: 48.12°N 71.18°W
- Areas affected: Canada
- Max. intensity: MMI VII (Very strong)

The 1988 Saguenay earthquake struck Quebec, Canada with a moment magnitude of 5.9 on November 25. It is one of the largest recorded earthquakes in eastern Canada and eastern North America during the 20th century. The earthquake was felt by millions, and damaged some buildings. It could be felt as far as Toronto, Halifax, and Boston.

The earthquake was triggered by faults associated with the Saguenay Graben.

Aftershocks were felt as far south as Pennsylvania, USA, and as far west as Michigan.

== See also ==
- List of earthquakes in Canada
