= Lake Stowe =

Lake in Vermont, United States

Coordinates: 44.7551°N 72.6559°W

Lake Stowe was a glacial lake that formed in Central Vermont approximately 15,000 years ago in the late Pleistocene epoch. After the Laurentide Ice Sheet retreated, glacial ice melt accumulated at the terminal moraine.

The lake existed until the glacier had completely melted. Then it flowed out through the Lamoille River valley.

The lake was named after Stowe, near where evidence of the lake was discovered.

== See also ==
- Champlain Sea
- Lake Albany
- Lake Hitchcock
- Lake Merrimack
