= 1918 San Jacinto earthquake =

Earthquake in Southern California

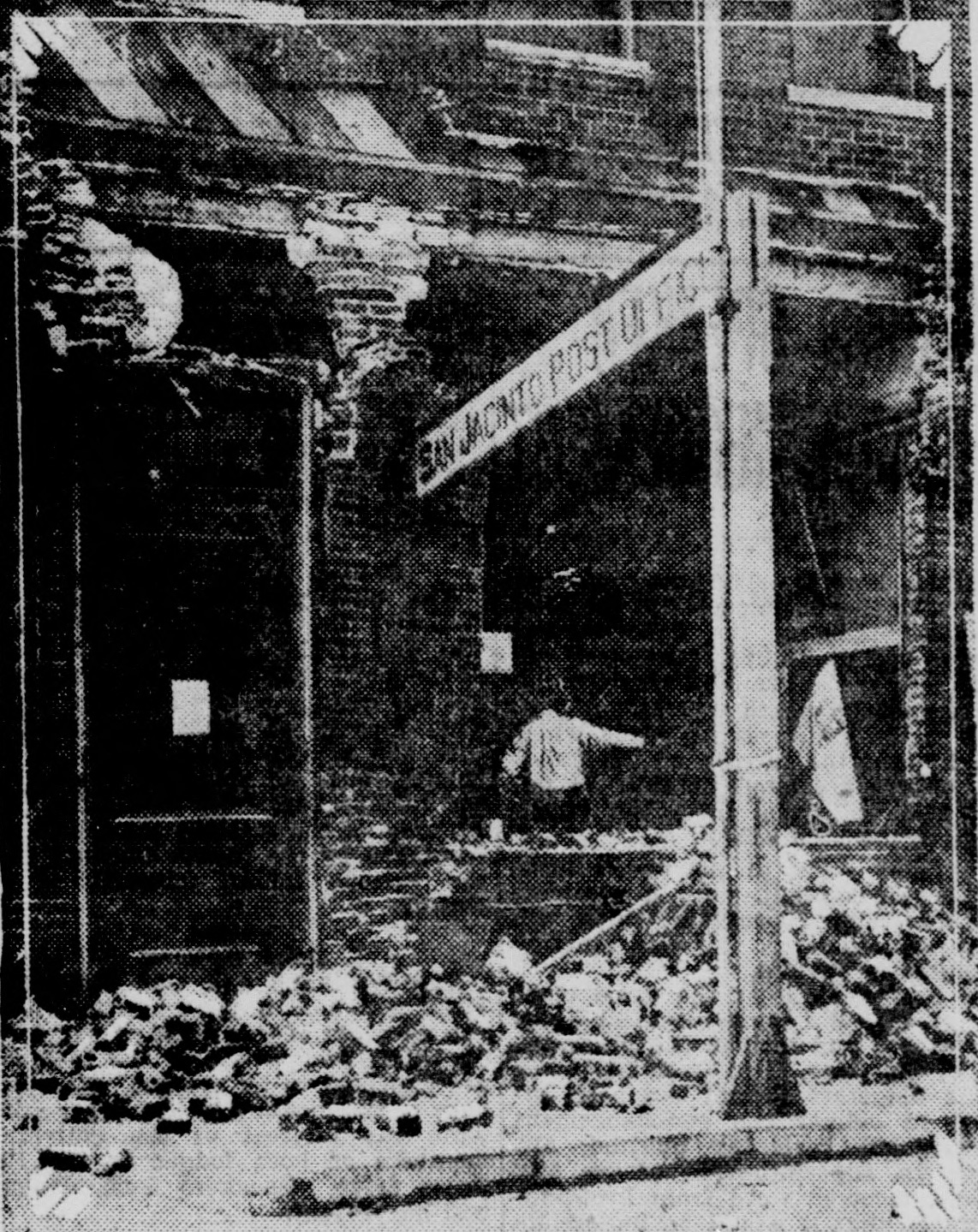
- The San Jacinto post office after the quake

- UTC time: 1918-04-21 22:32:29
- ISC event: 913126
- USGS-ANSS: ComCat
- Local date: April 21, 1918
- Local time: 14:32:29
- Magnitude: 6.7 M_{w}
- Depth: 10 km (6 mi)
- Epicenter: 33.7500°N 116.8833°W
- Fault: San Jacinto Fault Zone
- Total damage: $200,000
- Max. intensity: MMI IX (Violent)
- Casualties: 1 dead, several injured

The 1918 San Jacinto earthquake occurred in extreme eastern San Diego County in Southern California on April 21 at 14:32:29 local time. The shock had a moment magnitude of 6.7 and a maximum Mercalli intensity of IX (Violent). Several injuries and one death occurred with total losses estimated to be $200,000.

== Tectonic setting ==
The San Jacinto Fault Zone is a major strike-slip fault zone that runs through San Bernardino, Riverside, San Diego, and Imperial counties in Southern California. The SJFZ is a component of the larger San Andreas transform system and is considered to be the most seismically active fault zone in the area. Together they relieve the majority of the stress between the Pacific and North American tectonic plates.

== Damage ==
Many of the buildings in San Jacinto's business district were of poor construction, and all but one frame building and one concrete building collapsed, though high-quality structures did not experience serious damage. Minor damage to other buildings within 160 kilometers (99 mi) of San Jacinto also occurred. Roadways and irrigation canals also sustained damage and small sand blows were seen on a farm northwest of San Jacinto.

The earthquake occurred on a Sunday afternoon when most of the businesses in San Jacinto were closed and void of customers. The business district had the greatest damage, though Hemet was also severely damaged. Damage to chimneys, windows, and plaster walls occurred to buildings and structures within 100 miles (160 km) of San Jacinto. Some of the damage that was inspected included landslides, partially collapsed buildings, and damaged irrigation canals and roads. Ground cracks were observed near the banks of the San Jacinto River.

== See also ==
- List of earthquakes in 1918
- List of earthquakes in California
- List of earthquakes in the United States
