= 1732 Montreal earthquake =

Earthquake in Canada

- Location within Canada
- USGS-ANSS: ComCat
- Local date: September 16, 1732
- Local time: 11:00 a.m.
- Magnitude: 5.8 mb_{Lg}
- Epicenter: 45.5°N 73.6°W
- Areas affected: Canada (New France)
- Max. intensity: MMI VIII–IX
- Casualties: 1 reported, not enough evidence found

The 1732 Montreal earthquake was a 5.8 mb_{Lg} magnitude earthquake that struck New France at 11:00 a.m. on September 16, 1732. The shaking associated with this earthquake shook the city of Montreal with significant damage, including destroyed chimneys, cracked walls and 300 damaged houses, as well as 185 buildings destroyed by fire following the earthquake, representing approximately 30% of the houses in the city at the time. A girl was reported killed. This was one of the major earthquakes that occurred in the Western Quebec seismic zone.

== See also ==
- List of earthquakes in Canada
- List of historical earthquakes
