= Western Quebec seismic zone =

Coordinates: 46.37°N 76.71°W

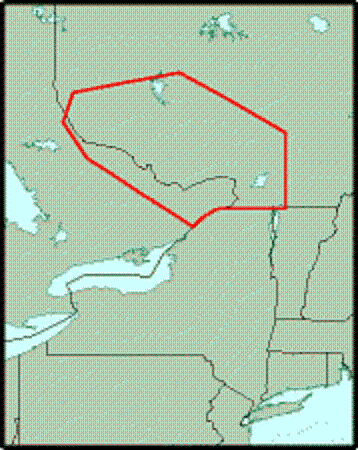
Location of the Western Quebec seismic zone

The Western Quebec Seismic Zone (French: Zone sismique de l'Ouest du Québec) is a seismically active area in the Ottawa Valley in Eastern Ontario and Western Quebec. The zone stretches from Montreal to Témiscaming and from Cornwall up along the Laurentian Mountains.

Significant earthquakes associated with this seismic zone include the 1732 Montreal earthquake, the 1935 Timiskaming earthquake, the 1944 Cornwall–Massena earthquake, and the 2010 Central Canada earthquake.

Between the years 1980 and 2000 there were 16 earthquakes stronger than a Richter 4.0, with many more of a lesser magnitude. The zone averages about one seismic event every five days.

Seismological monitoring of the zone is performed by the Canadian National Seismograph Network.

== Significant earthquakes ==
=== 1732 Montreal earthquake ===
Because this is the earliest recorded local earthquake, there is little information about it. It is known that it was a powerful earthquake, leaving much devastation but few deaths. It caused panic and damage to buildings. The aftershocks could be felt for several days after the initial earthquake.

=== 1935 Timiskaming earthquake ===
At the epicenter of the 1935 Timiskaming earthquake, cracks in gravel and sand could be seen. Almost all chimneys were damaged or destroyed, and some cracks developed in brick walls. The next day, Tee Lake (close to the epicenter) was clouded. It is suspected that sediment which was previously undisturbed was shaken up by the earthquake. This event scored a 7 on the Modified Mercalli Scale.

=== 1944 Cornwall–Massena earthquake ===
Although it was only measured as 5.8 on the Richter magnitude scale, the Cornwall earthquake did considerable damage and also scored a 7 on the Modified Mercalli Scale. Roughly 2000 chimneys were damaged or destroyed. One school suffered heavy damage with brick falling through the roof of its gym.

=== 2010 Central Canada earthquake ===
On 23 June 2010 at 1:41:42 EST, a 5.0 magnitude earthquake occurred 32 km north of Buckingham, Quebec at a depth of 18 km. It was felt throughout Western Quebec, Ottawa, and other parts of Ontario, and as far away as Maryland, Michigan, New York, Ohio, Pennsylvania and Vermont in the U.S.

=== 2013 Central Canada earthquakes ===
On 17 May 2013 at 9:43:23 EST, a 5.2 magnitude earthquake occurred 17 km north of Shawville, Quebec at a depth of 5 km. At 9:53:54 EST, a 4.1 magnitude aftershock occurred 20 km north of Shawville. It was felt throughout Western Quebec, Ottawa, and other parts of Ontario, and as far away as Ohio in the U.S.

== See also ==
- List of earthquakes in Canada
