= Saint Lawrence rift system =

Seismically active zone paralleling the Saint Lawrence River

The Saint Lawrence rift system is a seismically active zone paralleling the Saint Lawrence River. The rift system trends northeast and southwest and forms a half-graben that links the Ottawa-Bonnechere and the Saguenay grabens. The rift system extends more than 1,000 km (620 mi) along the Saint Lawrence valley from the Ottawa – Montreal area. Within the system, fault reactivation is believed to occur along late Proterozoic to early Paleozoic normal faults related to the opening of the Iapetus Ocean.

Two significant historically active seismic zones occur along this system associated with northwest trending intersecting graben structures. The Charlevoix region has been the location of at least five magnitude six or larger earthquakes over the last 350 years, including the 1925 Charlevoix–Kamouraska earthquake. At the Lower St Lawrence zone the largest recorded earthquakes are about magnitude five. Seismic studies indicate a crustal convergence across the Saint Lawrence valley of about 0.5 mm (0.020 in) per year.

The earthquakes of the Charlevoix seismic zone are thought to be related to the re-activation of ancient fault structures by the Charlevoix impact event.

Post-glacial rebound is also a cause of earthquakes in the St. Lawrence lowlands.

== See also ==
- 1944 Cornwall–Massena earthquake – Earthquake near the New York–Ontario border
- List of earthquakes in Canada
