= 1989 Ungava earthquake =

Earthquake in Canada

- Location within Quebec
- UTC time: 1989-12-25 14:24:34
- ISC event: 384953
- USGS-ANSS: ComCat
- Local date: 25 December 1989
- Local time: 09:24:34
- Magnitude: 6.3 M_{s}, 6.0 M_{w}
- Depth: <5 km
- Epicenter: 60.12°N 73.60°W
- Areas affected: Canada
- Max. intensity: MMI IV (Light)
- Foreshocks: 5.1 mb^{(PDE)} 1989-12-25 04:25
- Casualties: None

The 1989 Ungava earthquake occurred at 09:24 local time (14:24 UTC) on 25 December to the north of Lac Bécard in a remote part of the Ungava Peninsula in northern Quebec. It had a magnitude of 6.3 on the surface-wave magnitude scale and 6.2–6.5 on the moment magnitude scale and a maximum felt intensity of only IV (Light) on the Mercalli intensity scale, due to its remoteness from any inhabited areas. The mainshock was preceded by a magnitude 5.1 foreshock ten hours earlier. It was the first earthquake in eastern North America known to be associated with ground rupture.

== Tectonic setting ==
The northern part of Quebec lies mainly on the Minto block of the Superior craton. The earthquake occurred within the Utsalik domain, which consists mainly of Archean granitic and granodioritic rocks. A number of northerly trending brittle fault zones have been recognized in the domain. The area has been tectonically quiescent since the Archean. However, like most of the Canadian Shield, it is currently experiencing post-glacial rebound.

== Earthquake ==
The mainshock was preceded by a series of foreshocks, starting with a magnitude 5.1 event about 10 hours earlier. The hypocentral depth was very shallow, less than 5 km (3.1 mi).

Modelling of seismic waveforms shows that the earthquake was caused by two sub-events, a thrust event followed almost immediately by a strike-slip event. The surface offsets show consistent thrust faulting over a distance of 8.5 km (5.3 mi), with a maximum displacement of 1.8 m (5.9 ft) near the centre of the zone. The fault zone has a strike of N 038° E. There is no evidence of previous rupture along the fault zone.

The northwest-southeast orientation of the maximum horizontal stress derived from the observed focal mechanism is at a high angle to the regional stress field for North America. It has been suggested that this compression is a result of the area being in a 'saddle zone' between two centres of post-glacial uplift.

== See also ==
- List of earthquakes in 1989
- List of earthquakes in Canada
