= Charlevoix seismic zone =

Coordinates: 47.6°N 70.1°W

The Charlevoix seismic zone is a seismically active area in the Charlevoix region of northeastern Quebec, Canada. It is also known as the Charlevoix-Kamouraska seismic zone because earthquakes occur in Kamouraska County where the land expression of the seismic zone is separated by the Saint Lawrence River. Much seismic activity takes place under the river.

With over 200 small earthquakes occurring each year, the Charlevoix seismic zone is one of the most active seismic zones in Canada. Since 1663, five damaging earthquakes have occurred in the area, including a magnitude 7.3–7.9 event in 1663, a magnitude 6.0 event in 1791, a magnitude 6.0 event in 1860, a magnitude 6.5 event in 1870 and a magnitude 6.2 event in 1925. Because of these concerns, the Charlevoix seismic zone is considered to be a highly hazardous earthquake zone and it is comparable to those in British Columbia where earthquakes are due to movement of the Earth's tectonic plates. In contrast, the Charlevoix seismic zone lies in the interior of the North American plate and its origin is not well known.

== See also ==
- Saint Lawrence rift system
