= 1663 Charlevoix earthquake =

Magnitude 7 earthquake (February 5, 1663) affecting New France (now Quebec, Canada)

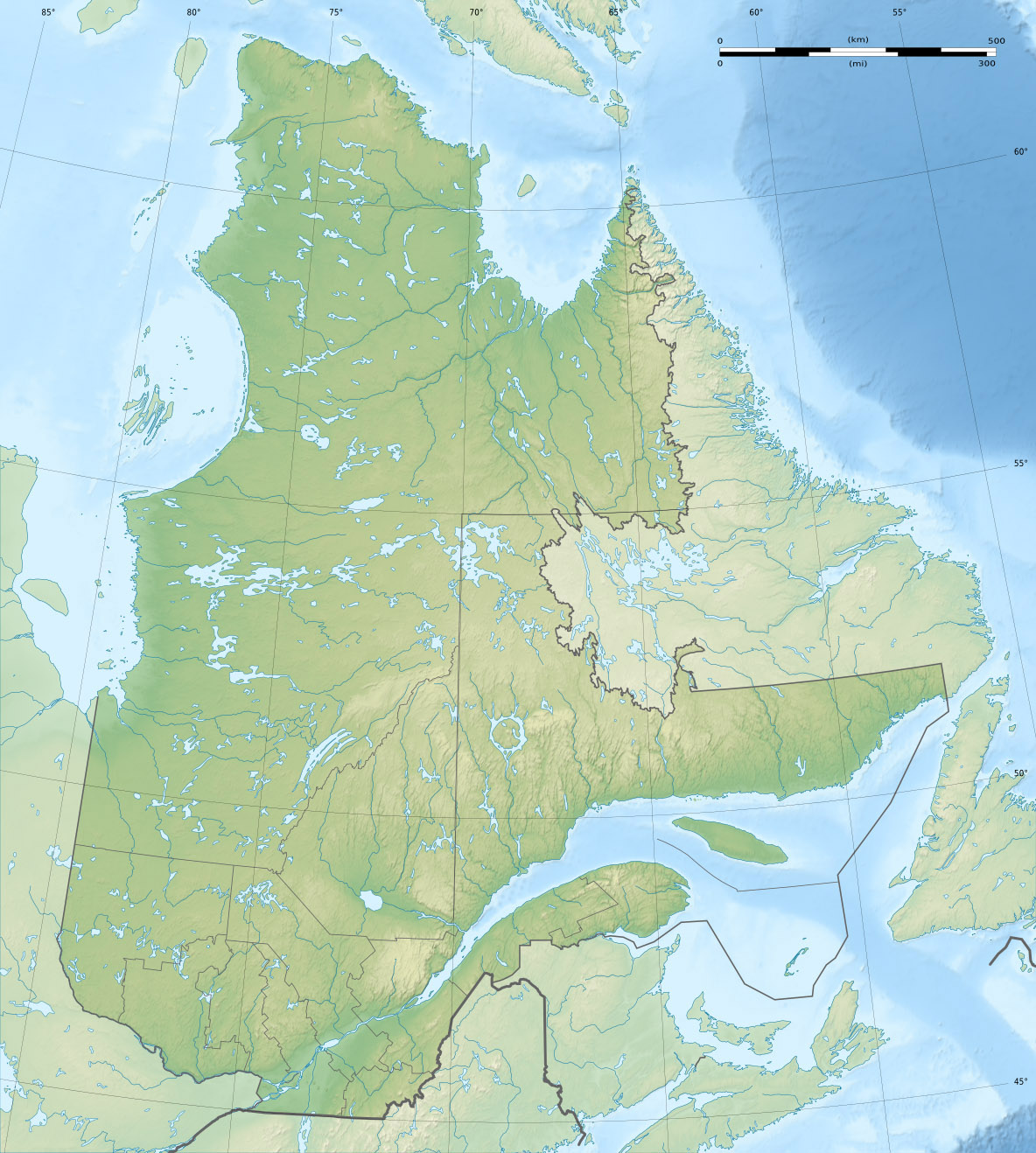
- USGS-ANSS: ComCat
- Local date: February 5, 1663
- Local time: 17:30
- Magnitude: 7.3–7.9 M_{w}
- Epicenter: 47.6°N 70.1°W
- Areas affected: New France; British America
- Max. intensity: MMI X (Extreme)

The 1663 Charlevoix earthquake occurred on February 5 in New France (now the Canadian province of Quebec), and was assessed to have a moment magnitude of between 7.3 and 7.9. The earthquake occurred at 5:30 p.m. local time and was estimated to have a maximum perceived intensity of X (Extreme) on the Mercalli intensity scale. The main shock epicentre is suggested to have occurred along the Saint Lawrence River, between the mouth of the Malbaie River on the north and the mouth of the Ouelle River on the south. A large portion of eastern North America felt the effects. Landslides and underwater sediment slumps were a primary characteristic of the event with much of the destruction occurring near the epicentral region of the St. Lawrence estuary and also in the area of the Saguenay Graben.

The event occurred during the early European settlement of North America and some of the best-recorded first-hand accounts were from Catholic missionaries that were working in the area. These records were scrutinized to help determine the scale of damage and estimate the magnitude of the quake in the absence of abundant records from that time period.

== Tectonic setting ==
The Charlevoix seismic zone (CSZ) lies along the St. Lawrence River, northeast of Quebec City. Although eastern Canada has relatively infrequent earthquakes, due to its location away from active plate boundaries, the CSZ is its most active part, with five earthquakes of estimated magnitude of 6 or greater since historical records began. Focal mechanisms for earthquakes in this zone are consistent with rupture on both reverse faults and strike-slip faults of varied orientation. The main structures of the area are faults of the Saint Lawrence rift system that run parallel to the river, formed during the break-up of the supercontinent Rodinia in the late Neoproterozoic and early Paleozoic. The greatest seismicity occurs where the rift is overprinted by a ~300 Ma meteorite impact structure, the Charlevoix impact structure. Most CSZ earthquakes have hypocenters within the Grenvillian basement at depths between 7 and 15 km. Many of the smaller earthquakes do not appear to be located on the rift faults, but within the volumes of rock between them. Larger events lie outside the impact structure and have inferred nodal planes consistent with reactivation of the rift faults. The relatively weak impact structure is interpreted to cause a perturbation of the regional stress field, affecting the stability of the rift faults.

The estimated length of the most active portion of the CSZ was 73 kilometres (45 mi) and the fault area was put at 73 km × 25 km (45 mi × 16 mi). By comparison, the 7 February 1812 New Madrid event, which was thought to have taken place on the Reelfoot fault and was the largest event in that series, had a rupture zone that was less than that of the Charlevoix earthquake and caused chimney damage at distances of more than 600 kilometres (370 mi). These things together suggest that the Charlevoix earthquake was similar in size to the largest of the New Madrid earthquakes and was at least a magnitude 6.8 event. The estimation of the earthquake's intensity was based on the condition of the soil where the damage occurred. A lower-magnitude range would be preferred if the soil in the area was soft and loosely compacted and a range based on firm ground or bedrock would be proportionately higher.

== Effects ==
The earthquake was felt sharply in New England, though the date recorded for the event was 26 January 1663, as New England was using the Julian calendar at the time. A church record entry made by Reverend S. Danforth from Roxbury, Massachusetts (~600 km from the CSZ) indicated the initial shock was felt around 6 pm that evening and several more shocks followed the next morning. On the shores of Massachusetts Bay, the tops of chimneys were broken on houses and pewter (a malleable metal alloy) was jarred from shelves. This level of damage is consistent with a modified Mercalli intensity of VI though this may have been because the early colonials had the capability of producing only relatively weak mortar. Using this MMI value and the distance from the epicenter one can estimate the magnitude of the earthquake using published intensity-attenuation relations. In a June 2011 report on the earthquake that was published in the Bulletin of the Seismological Society of America, John E. Ebel, a professor and researcher at Boston College, used these known relations that apply to earthquakes in northeastern North America and determined the magnitude to be 7.3–7.9.

Great landslides along the Saint Lawrence, Saint-Maurice, and Batiscan Rivers made these rivers muddy after the shock, with the waters of the St. Lawrence being affected for up to one month. Near Trois-Rivières several waterfalls were transformed by these landslides, and one waterfall on the St. Maurice River near Les Grès was said to have been nearly leveled. At Saint-Jean-Vianney, Quebec, there was a large earthflow landslide in a sensitive clay, interpreted to have been caused by the 1663 earthquake. In 1971 this was the site of another much smaller earthflow that destroyed 41 houses and killed 31 people.

Multibeam bathymetry data and high-resolution seismic reflection data acquired in the Saguenay Fjord has been used to identify a series of landslide deposits that were probably triggered by the 1663 earthquake. The Saguenay region is the site of a geological graben and has been subject to several natural disasters since the turn of the seventeenth century. In 1996 it was the site of the largest flood in 20th-century Canadian history, which led to the investigation of the fjord bottom using bathymetric data to determine slope stability.

== Historical records ==
The inhabitants of the land were the Algonquin and Iroquois people as well as several thousand French settlers. Religious groups like the Ursulines (a Roman Catholic religious institute for women) and the Augustinians left good records of the event. These groups accredited the earthquake to God as a retaliation for disobedience and the sale of alcohol to Indigenous people. Some very detailed, though inconsistent, summaries were given by several Jesuits, most notably Jérôme Lalemant who provided relatively reserved written accounts of the strong effects of the earthquake back to his superiors in Europe. Lalemant was said to have been a disciplined priest with diverse experience and following his time in Canada was brought back to France to be posted the provincial superior of the Society of Jesus. Father Charles Simon, on the other hand, was said to have limited training and some written records of his were not received as readily or without hesitation. Father Simon seemed to not be of the same mind as the bulk of the devoted, saying "...the Earthquake was rather a Scheme of Divine Mercy than a scourge of Justice,— especially since, in so great a confusion of affairs and perturbations of the elements, no one lost life or fortune. Fear came to all, penalty to none."

== Aftermath ==
Immediately after the earthquake, the missionaries, once it had become clear that no lives had been lost, regarded the earthquake not only as a timely warning to the population of New France for their sinfulness, but also as a sign of God's protection. They described it as "miraculous" rather than a disaster, regarding the date of the earthquake as particularly important, coming on the last day of the carnival, just before Mardi Gras. They were pleased to see all the colonists attending church regularly in the following days and that even the traffickers in wine and brandy appeared to repent. These effects were short-lived and Lalemant and other missionaries were soon left wishing for another great earthquake to help them in their cause.

== See also ==
- List of earthquakes in Canada
- List of earthquakes in the United States
- List of historical earthquakes

== Bibliography ==
- Ebel, J. E. (June 2011), "A New Analysis of the Magnitude of the February 1663 Earthquake at Charlevoix, Quebec", Bulletin of the Seismological Society of America, 101 (3), Seismological Society of America: 1024–1038, Bibcode:2011BuSSA.101.1024E, doi:10.1785/0120100190
- Hodgson, E. A. (1928), "The Probable Epicentre of the Saint Lawrence Earthquake of Feb. 5 1663", Journal of the Royal Astronomical Society of Canada, 22, Royal Astronomical Society of Canada: 325–334, Bibcode:1928JRASC..22..325H
- Berry, L. (2006), "Le Ciel et la Terre nous ont parlé – Comment les missionnaires du Canada français de l'époque coloniale interprétèrent le tremblement de terre de 1663" (PDF), L'Histoire Environnementale (in French), 60 (1–2), Institut d'histoire de l'Amérique française: 11–35
