= Lake Merrimack =

Former lake in New Hampshire, United States

Coordinates: 43°20′N 71°37′W

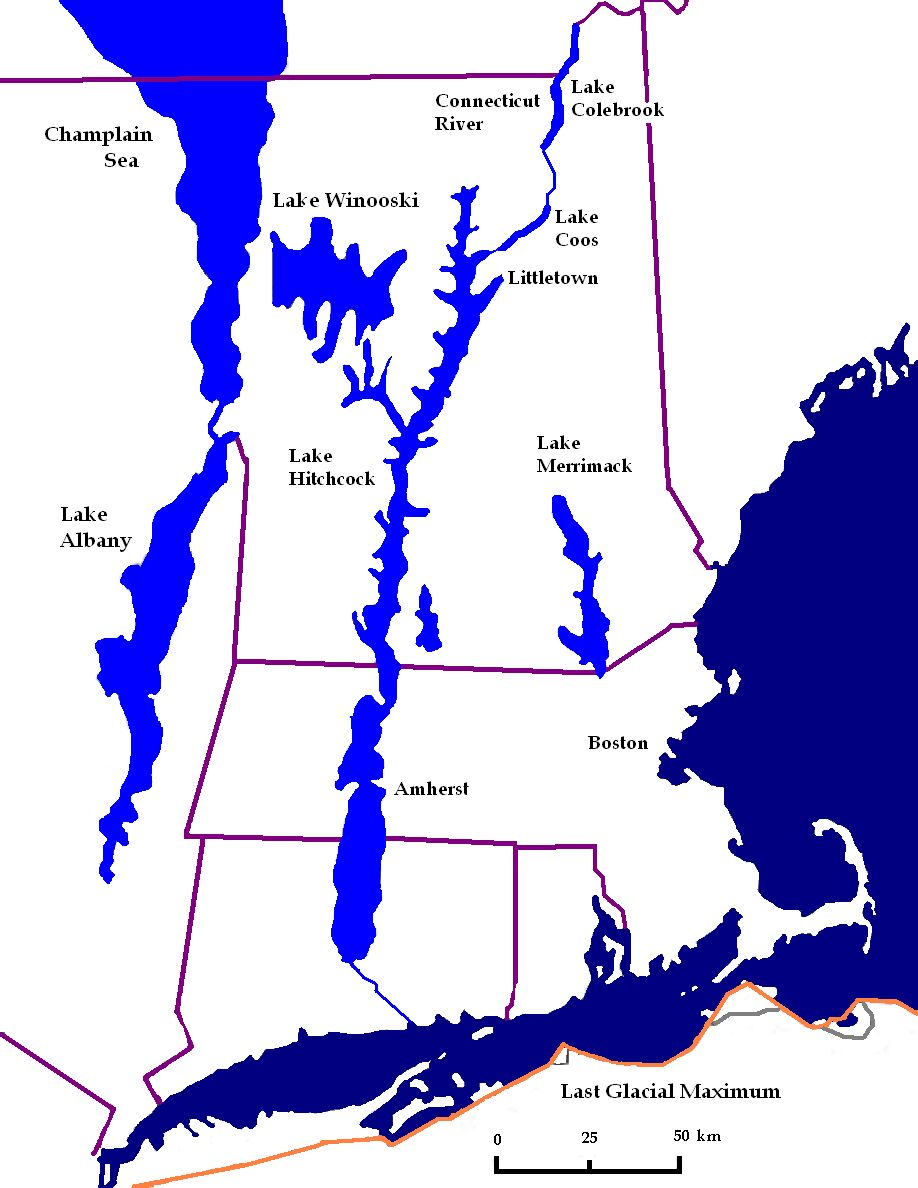
Proglacial and prehistoric lakes of New England during the end of the Wisconsin Glacial Epoch of the Pleistocene Era.

Lake Merrimack was a glacial lake that formed during the late Pleistocene epoch. After the Laurentide Ice Sheet retreated, glacial ice melt accumulated at the terminal moraine and blocked up the Merrimack River, creating the narrow lake. The lake extended from Manchester to Plymouth, New Hampshire. It is unknown when the lake was drained.

The glacial origins and history of Lake Merrimack has been inferred from the sedimentary deposits that are found across parts of New Hampshire, and along the drainages of the present day Merrimack river.

Lake Hitchcock is an important part of the geology of New Hampshire. It experienced annual layering of sediments, or varves: silt and sand in the summertime (due to glacial meltwater) and clay in the wintertime (as the lake froze).

== See also ==
- Lake Winnipesaukee
- Champlain Sea
- Lake Albany
- Lake Hitchcock
- Lake Stowe
