= List of earthquakes in 1918 =

Earthquakes in 1918
Approximate epicenters of the earthquakes in 1918
- 4.0–5.9 magnitude
- 6.0–6.9 magnitude
- 7.0–7.9 magnitude
- 8.0+ magnitude
- Strongest: Philippines, south of Mindanao August 15 (Magnitude 8.3)
- Deadliest: China, off the coast of Fujian Province February 13 (Magnitude 7.3) 2,000 deaths
- Total fatalities: 2,221

Number by magnitude
- 9.0+: 0

This is a list of earthquakes in 1918. Only magnitude 6.0 or greater earthquakes appear on the list. Lower magnitude events are included if they have caused death, injury or damage. Events which occurred in remote areas will be excluded from the list as they wouldn't have generated significant media interest. All dates are listed according to UTC time. A couple of major events capped a fairly active year. The two major events came within weeks of each other. The largest was a magnitude 8.3 in the Philippines in August. In early September a magnitude 8.1 struck Russia. The deadliest event occurred in February in China when a magnitude 7.3 caused 2,000 deaths.

== Overall ==
=== By death toll ===
Rank	Death toll	Magnitude	Location	MMI	Depth (km)	Date
1	2,000	7.3	China, Fujian Province	X (Extreme)	15.0	February 13
2	144	7.1-7.3	United States, northwest of Puerto Rico	IX (Violent)	9.3	October 11
3	52	8.3	Philippines, south of Mindanao	X (Extreme)	20.0	August 15
4	23	8.1	Russian SFSR, Kuril Islands	( )	15.0	September 7

- Note: At least 10 casualties

=== By magnitude ===
Rank	Magnitude	Death toll	Location	MMI	Depth (km)	Date
1	8.3	52	Philippines, south of Mindanao	X (Extreme)	20.0	August 15
2	8.1	23	Russian SFSR, Kuril Islands	( )	15.0	September 7
= 3	7.8	0	Russian SFSR, east of the Kuril Islands	( )	15.0	November 8
= 3	7.8	1	Chile, Atacama Region	( )	25.0	December 4
= 4	7.5	0	New Guinea, off the north coast of	( )	15.0	July 3
= 4	7.5	0	Dutch East Indies, Babar Islands	( )	35.0	November 18
5	7.4	0	Russia, Primorsky Krai	( )	330.4	January 30
= 6	7.3	2,000	China, Fujian Province	X (Extreme)	15.0	February 13
= 6	7.3	0	central Mid-Atlantic Ridge	( )	15.0	May 20
= 7	7.2	0	Bangladesh, Sreemangal Upazila	( )	15.0	July 8
= 7	7.2	0	New Guinea, Mussau Island	( )	15.0	October 27
= 8	7.1	0	Fiji	( )	35.0	May 22
= 8	7.1	144	United States, northwest of Puerto Rico	IX (Violent)	15.0	October 11
= 8	7.1	0	northern Mid-Atlantic Ridge	( )	15.0	December 2
= 9	7.0	0	China, Heilongjiang Province	( )	564.9	April 10
= 9	7.0	0	New Guinea, north of New Ireland (island)	( )	15.0	May 20

- Note: At least 7.0 magnitude

== Notable events ==
=== January ===
January
- Strongest: 7.4 M_{w} Russia
- Total fatalities: 0

Number by magnitude
- 8.0–8.9: 0
- 7.0–7.9: 1
- 6.0–6.9: 1

Date	Country and location	M_{w}	Depth (km)	MMI	Notes	Casualties	
Date	Country and location	M_{w}	Depth (km)	MMI	Notes	Dead	Injured
21	Dutch East Indies, off the north coast of West Papua (province)	6.3	25.0				
30	Russia, Primorsky Krai	7.4	330.4				

=== February ===
February
- Strongest: 7.3 M_{w} China
- Deadliest: 7.3 M_{w} China; 2,000 deaths
- Total fatalities: 2,000

Number by magnitude
- 8.0–8.9: 0
- 7.0–7.9: 1
- 6.0–6.9: 3

Date	Country and location	M_{w}	Depth (km)	MMI	Notes	Casualties	
Date	Country and location	M_{w}	Depth (km)	MMI	Notes	Dead	Injured
7	Philippines, southeast Mindanao	6.9	35.0	VII			
9	China, Jilin Province	6.5	450.0				
13	China, Shantou City Guangdong Province	7.3	15.0	X	The 1918 Shantou earthquake caused 2,000 deaths. At least more than 1,000 people were injured. Major damage was caused with scores of homes being destroyed. Shantou was hardest hit.	2,000	1,000+
24	Grenada, southwest of	6.2	35.0				

=== April ===
April
- Strongest: 7.0 M_{w} China
- Deadliest: 6.7 M_{w} United States; 1 death
- Total fatalities: 1

Number by magnitude
- 8.0–8.9: 0
- 7.0–7.9: 1
- 6.0–6.9: 1

Date	Country and location	M_{w}	Depth (km)	MMI	Notes	Casualties	
Date	Country and location	M_{w}	Depth (km)	MMI	Notes	Dead	Injured
10	China, Heilongjiang Province	7.0	564.9				
21	United States, southern California	6.7	10.0		1 person died and several were injured in the 1918 San Jacinto earthquake. Major damage was caused.	1	1+

=== May ===
May
- Strongest: 7.3 M_{w} central Mid-Atlantic Ridge
- Total fatalities: 0

Number by magnitude
- 8.0–8.9: 0
- 7.0–7.9: 3
- 6.0–6.9: 2

Date	Country and location	M_{w}	Depth (km)	MMI	Notes	Casualties	
Date	Country and location	M_{w}	Depth (km)	MMI	Notes	Dead	Injured
20	central Mid-Atlantic Ridge	7.3	15.0				
20	Chile, off the coast of Coquimbo Region	6.8	20.0				
20	New Guinea, north of New Ireland (island)	7.0	15.0				
22	Fiji	7.1	35.0				
23	Mexico, Sonora	6.8	10.0				

=== June ===
June
- Strongest: 6.2 M_{w} New Guinea
- Total fatalities: 0

Number by magnitude
- 8.0–8.9: 0
- 7.0–7.9: 0
- 6.0–6.9: 2

Date	Country and location	M_{w}	Depth (km)	MMI	Notes	Casualties	
Date	Country and location	M_{w}	Depth (km)	MMI	Notes	Dead	Injured
4	New Guinea, Morobe Province	6.2	15.0				
7	Australia, Queensland	6.0		VI-VII	–	–	-

=== July ===
July
- Strongest: 7.5 M_{w} New Guinea
- Total fatalities: 0

Number by magnitude
- 8.0–8.9: 0
- 7.0–7.9: 2
- 6.0–6.9: 6

Date	Country and location	M_{w}	Depth (km)	MMI	Notes	Casualties	
Date	Country and location	M_{w}	Depth (km)	MMI	Notes	Dead	Injured
1	Philippines east of Mindanao	6.5	35.0				
3	New Guinea, off the north coast	7.5	15.0				
8	Bangladesh, Netrokona District	7.2	15.0		Some damage was reported.		
15	United States, off the coast of northern California	6.4	15.0				
16	Greece Greece, north of Crete	6.5	150.0				
21	British Solomon Islands	6.7	20.0				
25	Japan, off the east coast of Honshu	6.7	35.0				
29	New Guinea, off the north coast	6.6	15.0				

=== August ===
August
- Strongest: 8.3 M_{w} Philippines
- Deadliest: 8.3 M_{w} Philippines; 52 deaths
- Total fatalities: 52

Number by magnitude
- 8.0–8.9: 1
- 7.0–7.9: 0
- 6.0–6.9: 5
- 5.0–5.9: 1

Date	Country and location	M_{w}	Depth (km)	MMI	Notes	Casualties	
Date	Country and location	M_{w}	Depth (km)	MMI	Notes	Dead	Injured
8	New Guinea, east of New Britain	6.5	35.0				
14	China, Yunnan Province	5.5	0.0	VII	Some damage was reported. Depth unknown.		
15	Philippines, off the south coast of Mindanao	8.3	20.0	X	The 1918 Celebes Sea earthquake caused 52 deaths. 46 were from the shaking and 6 from a major tsunami that washed ashore. Major damage was caused. The wave heights from the tsunami reached 24 feet.	52	
15	Philippines, off the south coast of Mindanao	6.4	35.0		Aftershock.		
15	Philippines, off the south coast of Mindanao	6.9	15.0		Aftershock.		
16	Philippines, off the south coast of Mindanao	6.1	35.0		Aftershock.		
23	British Solomon Islands, Santa Cruz Islands	6.5	15.0				

=== September ===
September
- Strongest: 8.1 M_{w} Russian SFSR
- Deadliest: 8.1 M_{w} Russian SFSR; 23 deaths
- Total fatalities: 23

Number by magnitude
- 8.0–8.9: 1
- 7.0–7.9: 0
- 6.0–6.9: 4

Date	Country and location	M_{w}	Depth (km)	MMI	Notes	Casualties	
Date	Country and location	M_{w}	Depth (km)	MMI	Notes	Dead	Injured
7	Russian SFSR, Kuril Islands	8.1	15.0		Further information: 1918 Kuril Islands earthquake and tsunami	23	7
13	Philippines, Batan Island	0.0	0.0	IX	Some homes were destroyed. Magnitude and depth unknown.		
22	Dutch East Indies, off the west coast of Sumatra	6.5	35.0				
22	Russian SFSR, Kuril Islands	6.7	35.0				
29	Syria, off the coast of	6.6	15.0				
30	France, southeast of the Loyalty Islands	6.5	35.0				

=== October ===
October
- Strongest: 7.2 M_{w} New Guinea
- Deadliest: 7.1 M_{w} United States; 144 deaths
- Total fatalities: 144

Number by magnitude
- 8.0–8.9: 0
- 7.0–7.9: 2
- 6.0–6.9: 2

Date	Country and location	M_{w}	Depth (km)	MMI	Notes	Casualties	
Date	Country and location	M_{w}	Depth (km)	MMI	Notes	Dead	Injured
11	United States, northwest of Puerto Rico	7.1	15.0	IX	The 1918 San Fermin earthquake caused major destruction to Puerto Rico. In total 144 deaths were caused by the earthquake and subsequent tsunami. Damage costs amounted to $4 million (1918 rate).	144	
14	Tonga	6.3	30.0				
19	El Salvador, Ahuachapan Department	6.6	35.0				
27	New Guinea, Mussau Island	7.2	15.0				

=== November ===
November
- Strongest: 7.8 M_{w} Russian SFSR
- Total fatalities: 0

Number by magnitude
- 8.0–8.9: 0
- 7.0–7.9: 2
- 6.0–6.9: 3

Date	Country and location	M_{w}	Depth (km)	MMI	Notes	Casualties	
Date	Country and location	M_{w}	Depth (km)	MMI	Notes	Dead	Injured
8	Russian SFSR, east of the Kuril Islands	7.8	15.0				
11	Japan, Nagano Prefecture, Honshu	6.5	5.0				
18	Dutch East Indies, Babar Islands	7.5	35.0				
23	Dutch East Indies, Banda Sea	6.9	15.0				
23	Russian SFSR, Sakha Republic	6.4	15.0				

=== December ===
December
- Strongest: 7.8 M_{w} Chile
- Deadliest: 7.8 M_{w} Chile; 1 death
- Total fatalities: 1+

Number by magnitude
- 8.0–8.9: 0
- 7.0–7.9: 2
- 6.0–6.9: 3

Date	Country and location	M_{w}	Depth (km)	MMI	Notes	Casualties	
Date	Country and location	M_{w}	Depth (km)	MMI	Notes	Dead	Injured
1	Turkestan ASSR, Gorno-Badakhshan Autonomous Region	6.5	20.0				
2	northern Mid-Atlantic Ridge	7.1	10.0				
4	Chile, Atacama Region	7.8	40.0		Some (at least 1) people were killed and Copiapo suffered major damage.	1+	
6	Canada, Vancouver Island	6.8	15.0		1918 Vancouver Island earthquake.		
25	New Guinea, southeast of New Britain	6.6	458.9				
