= 1918 Shantou earthquake =

Earthquake in Guangdong, China

- Location within Guangdong
- UTC time: 1918-02-13 06:07:18
- ISC event: 913072
- USGS-ANSS: ComCat
- Local date: February 13, 1918
- Local time: 14:07:18 CST
- Magnitude: 7.2 M_{w}
- Depth: 15 km (9.3 mi)
- Epicenter: 23.54°N 117.24°E
- Areas affected: China, Hong Kong
- Max. intensity: MMI X (Extreme)
- Tsunami: Moderate
- Casualties: 1,000 in Shantou

The 1918 Shantou earthquake occurred in Shantou, Guangdong, Republic of China. Serious damage and high casualty numbers were reported in Guangdong and the surrounding provinces. It also caused some damage in British Hong Kong.

== Earthquake ==
The event was a large intraplate earthquake occurring within the Eurasian plate, at the margin of the South China Sea. It displayed a strike-slip focal mechanism. This location hosts a rift zone, and was previously the site of subduction and collision during the Mesozoic. During the Cenozoic, extensional tectonics occurred. At least 14 earthquakes greater than magnitude 6.0 have been recorded historically. Offshore is the Littoral Fault Zone, a NE–ENE trending fault zone which runs parallel to the coast. Another fault, the Huanggangshui Fault, intersects the Littoral Fault Zone in a NE direction. In 1600, another magnitude 7.0 earthquake occurred in the same location as the 1918 event.

== Damage ==
The earthquake occurred on February 13, 1918, at 14:07 in the afternoon. The epicenter location is believed to be centered off Nan'ao Island or about 300 km northeast of the territory of Hong Kong, where the quake caused only minor damage and cracks to buildings in the territory. Nearer to the epicenter area, the earthquake had a maximum Modified Mercalli intensity of X (Extreme).

The eight provinces that were affected by the earthquake were Fujian, Guangdong, Hunan, Jiangxi, Zhejiang, Jiangsu, Anhui, and Hubei. Shaking was strong enough to cause damage to be felt over a 500,000 km^{2} area, covering 130 counties. In Zhao'an, Fujian Province alone, more than 3,000 homes collapsed, trapping or killing many residents. The Chao'an District of Chaozhou City in Guangdong Province saw 20% of all residential buildings completely destroyed and another 40% partially collapsed. In the prefectural-level city of Jieyang, almost all of the homes in the area were damaged, with at least half of them completely destroyed. Many pagodas, homes and temples in Suzhou, Guangzhou and Nanjing partially collapsed or were damaged due to the earthquake. The death toll from the disasters was at least a thousand, with many more wounded. The casualties included foreign traders and diplomats.

It is the only earthquake in Hong Kong's history to have caused damage. It was estimated to reach intensity VII on the Modified Mercalli intensity scale, Since the Royal Observatory, Hong Kong did not start operating long-period seismographs until 1921. According to the Hongkong Telegraph, the quake threw the whole Central District into a state of panic. The shock lasted about half a minute and could be felt over the entirety of Hong Kong Island and Kowloon.

As a result of the earthquake, numerous fissures opened in the ground, most of them several meters long and tens of centimeters wide. However, larger cracks up to many tens of meters long and up to one meter wide also formed. One crack along a coastal road in Shantou measured up to 330 meters long, and began blasting hot water. In Zhangpu County numerous cracks as wide as 33 centimeters and 100 meters long erupted black and yellow mud but closed up after the tremor was over.

== See also ==
- List of earthquakes in 1918
- List of earthquakes in China
- 1994 Taiwan Strait earthquake
