= Lake Hitchcock =

Prehistoric glacial lake in New England

Coordinates: 41°49′N 72°38′W

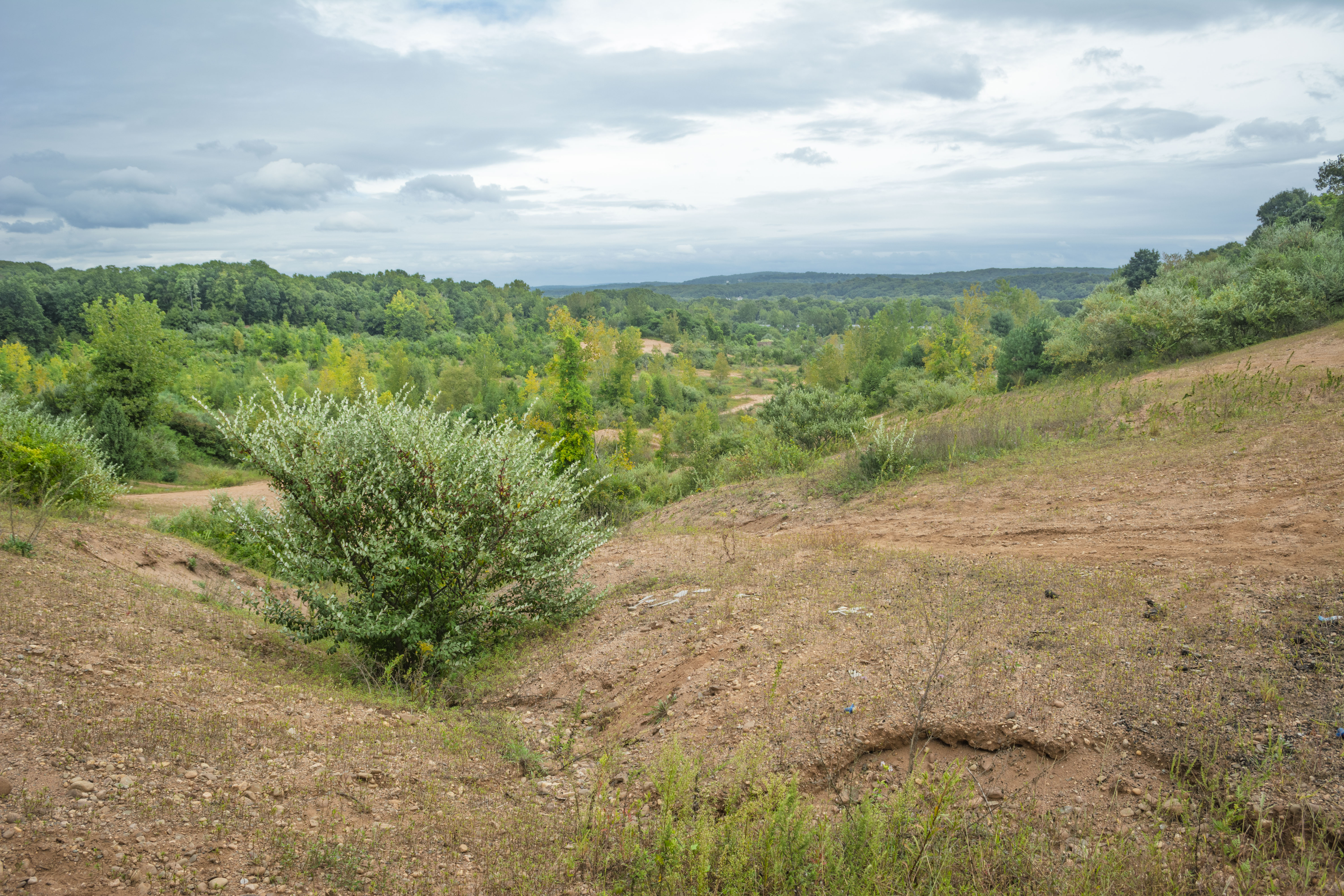
- Sediment dam in Rocky Hill that once held back Lake Hitchcock

- Location within USA Northeast
- Interactive map of Lake Hitchcock
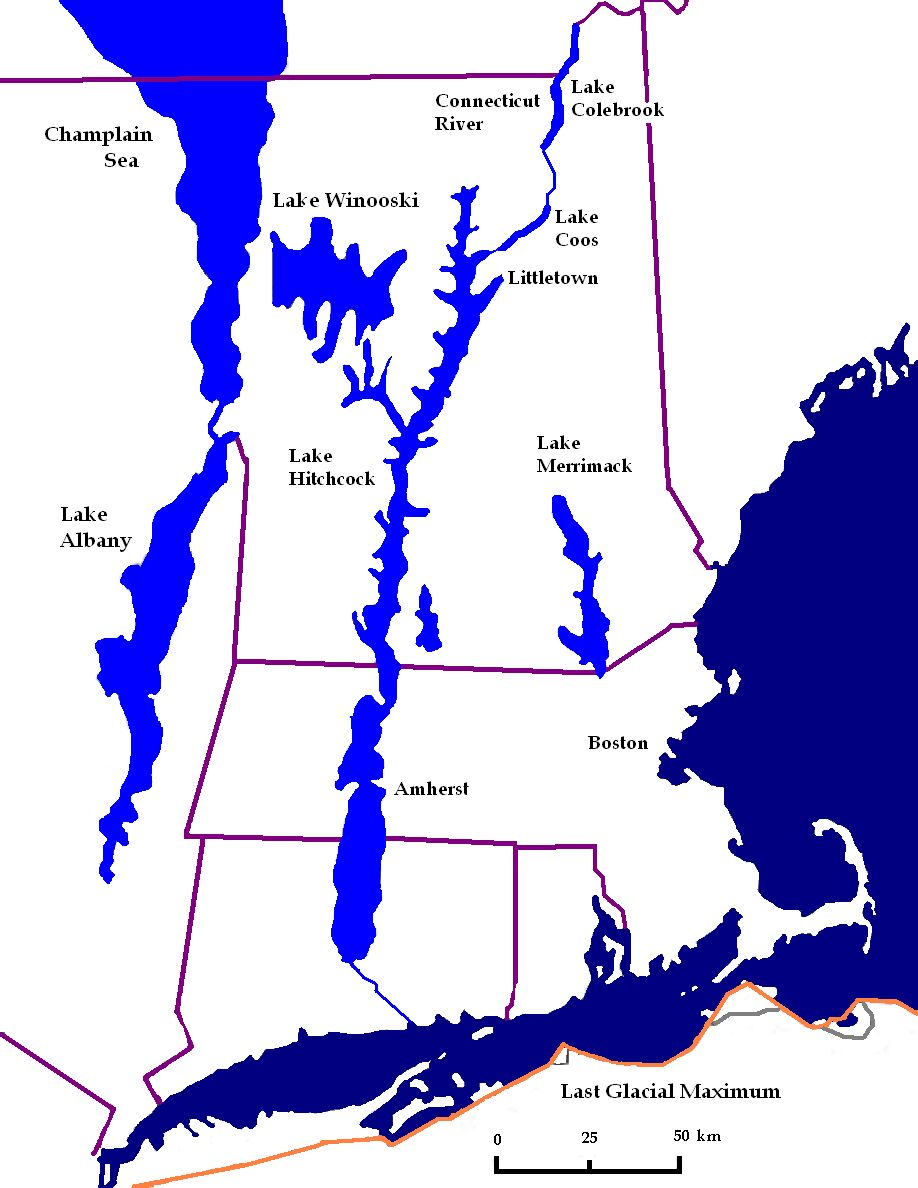
- Proglacial and prehistoric lakes of New England during the end of the Wisconsin Glacial Epoch of the Pleistocene Era
- Location: Parts of present day Vermont, New Hampshire, Massachusetts, and Connecticut, including Saint-Gaudens National Historical Park
- Type: Glacial lake
- Etymology: Edward Hitchcock
- Part of: Connecticut River Valley
- River sources: Connecticut River
- Basin countries: United States
- Managing agency: National Park Service
- First flooded: approx. 15,000 years ago
- Max. length: 200 miles (320 km)
- Surface elevation: 720 feet (220 m)

Lake Hitchcock was a glacial lake that formed approximately 15,000 years ago in the late Pleistocene epoch. As the Laurentide Ice Sheet retreated, glacial meltwater and runoff in the reemerging Connecticut River Valley was dammed by the terminal moraine, creating a long, narrow lake and trapping glacial sediment. The lake existed for approximately 3,000 years, after which a combination of erosion and continuing geological changes likely caused it to drain. At its longest, Lake Hitchcock stretched from the moraine dam, at present-day Rocky Hill, Connecticut, north to St. Johnsbury, Vermont (about 320 kilometres (200 mi)). Although the rift valley through which the river flows above Rocky Hill actually continues south to New Haven, on Long Island Sound, the obstructing moraine at Rocky Hill diverted the river southeast to its present mouth at Old Saybrook.

Lake Hitchcock forms an important part of the surficial geology of Connecticut, Massachusetts, New Hampshire, and Vermont,. It experienced annual layering of sediments, or varves: silt and sand in the summertime (due to glacial meltwater) and clay in the wintertime (as the lake froze). Analysis of varves along Canoe Brook in Vermont was conducted by John Ridge and Frederick Larsen, including radiocarbon dating of organic materials. Their research indicates that the lake formed sometime prior to around 15,600 years ago. Later, abrupt changes in sediment composition around 12,400 years ago appear to mark the initial breaching of the lake's dam. These varved lake deposits were later used by European settlers for brick-making. The lake was named after Edward Hitchcock (1793–1864), a geology professor from Amherst College who had studied it.

== See also ==
- Champlain Sea
- Lake Albany
- Lake Connecticut
- Lake Merrimack
- Lake Stowe
