= Lake Albany =

Prehistoric proglacial lake

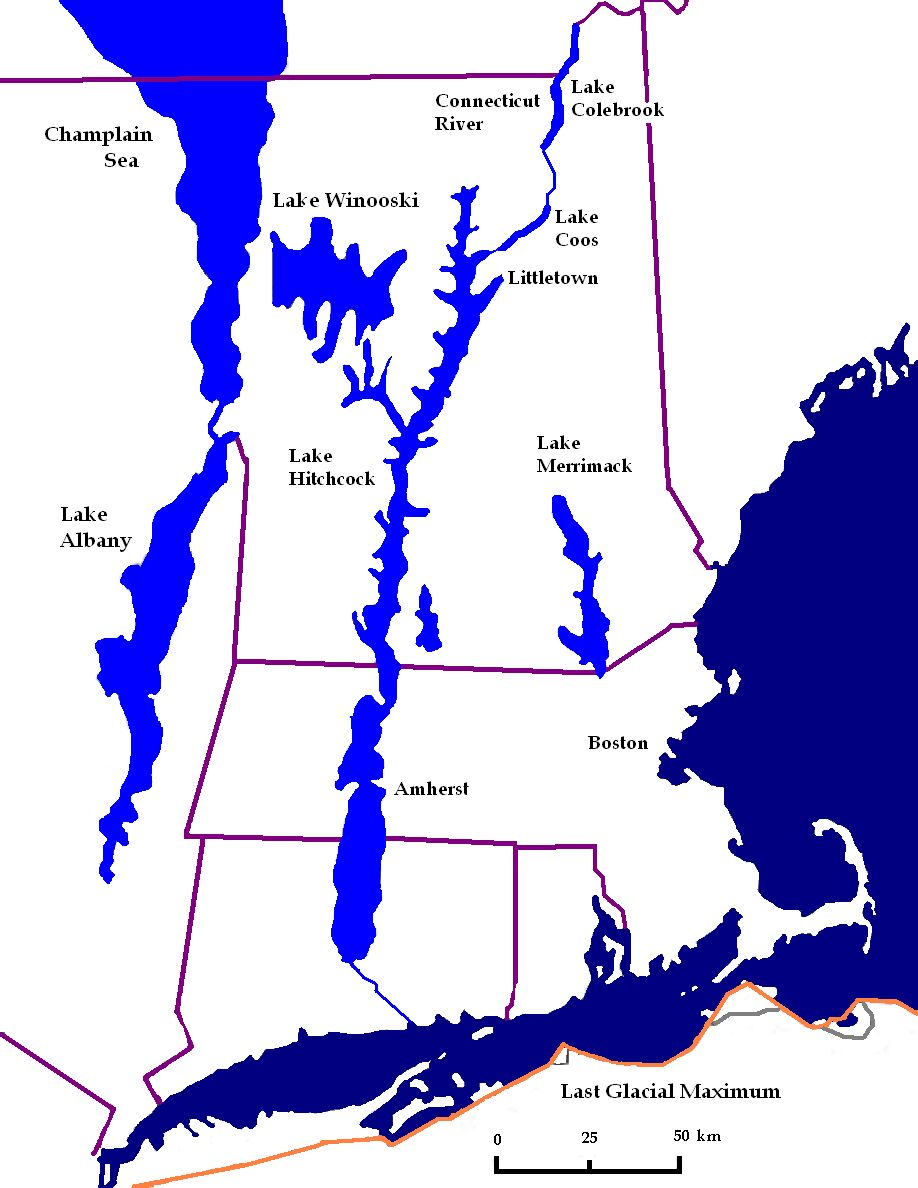
- Proglacial and prehistoric lakes of New England during the end of the Wisconsin Glacial Epoch of the Pleistocene Era

- Location within New York Location within the United States
- Interactive map of Lake Albany
- Location: between Poughkeepsie, New York at its southern-most tip to near Glens Falls, New York at its northern-most end
- Coordinates: 42.7183°N 73.8644°W
- Type: Proglacial lake
- Primary inflows: Lake Vermont
- Primary outflows: Hudson River
- Basin countries: United States
- Max. length: 160 miles (260 km)
- References: Coordinates approximated using details in International Oaks

Glacial Lake Albany was a prehistoric North American proglacial lake that formed during the end of the Wisconsinan glaciation. It existed between 15,000 and 12,600 years ago and was created when meltwater from a retreating glacier, along with water from rivers such as the Iromohawk, became ice dammed in the Hudson Valley.

Organic materials in Lake Albany deposits have been carbon dated to approximately 11,700 years ago.The lake spanned approximately 160 miles (260 km) from present-day Poughkeepsie to Glens Falls.

Lake Albany drained about 10,500 years ago through the Hudson River due to post-glacial rebound. When the lake drained it exposed the sandy and gravelly glaciolacustrine deposits left by the glacier, along a broad plain just west of Schenectady, where the Mohawk emptied into the lake. Dune and deltaic sands, containing lenses of silty sand, silt and clay, compose the topsoil which now underlies the Albany Pine Bush. Beneath the surficial deposits are lake-bottom silt and clay, which overlie till and shale bedrock. A small rill caused by the lake's drainage created Patroon Creek, Sand Creek, Lisha Kill, Shaker Creek, Delphus Kill and the Salt Kill in the town of Colonie, New York.

== See also ==
- Champlain Sea
- Lake Hitchcock
- Lake Merrimack
- Lake Stowe
