= List of earthquakes in Canada =

This is a list of earthquakes in Canada.

== List ==
Date	Place	Lat	Lon	Deaths	Injuries	Mag.	MMI	Comments
2025-12-06	Yukon/Alaska	60.359	-139.546			7.0	VIII	
2025-02-21	Squamish-Lillooet, BC	49.693	-123.545			4.8	VI	Widely felt across BC.
2017-05-01	Stikine Region, BC	59.83	−136.70			6.3	VIII	Minor damage / Doublet earthquake
2017-05-01	Stikine Region, BC	59.82	−136.71			6.2	VII	Minor damage / Doublet earthquake
2017-01-08	Nunavut	74.39	−92.42			6.0	VII	
2014-07-17	Yukon	60.35	−140.33			6.0	VI	
2014-04-24	West of Vancouver Island	49.64	−127.73			6.5	VI	
2013-01-05	Near Craig, Alaska	55.23	−134.86			7.5	VI	First supershear earthquake observed in an oceanic plate boundary
2012-10-27	Haida Gwaii	52.77	−131.93	1		7.8	V	Non-destructive tsunami
2010-06-23	Central Canada	45.9	−75.5			5.0 M_{w}	VI	
2009-11-17	Queen Charlotte Islands, BC	51.82	−131.78			6.5-6.6 M_{w}	V	
2009-07-07	Baffin Bay	75.35	−72.45			6.1		
2008-01-05	Queen Charlotte Islands, BC	51.07	−131.06			6.5 M_{w}		Doublet (6.4 M_{w} shock 40 minutes later)
2007-10-09	The Nazko region	52.88	−124.8			≤4.0	I	Swarm ended June 2008
2004-11-02	Vancouver Island, BC	49.28	−128.77			6.7 M_{w}		
2004-07-19	Vancouver Island	49.62	−126.97			6.4	VI	
2001-04-14	Alberta	56.08	−119.81			5.3	VII	Slight damage
2001-02-28	Puget Sound	47.19	−122.66	0–1	400	6.8 M_{w}	VIII	One possible related heart attack in Washington.
2000-01-01	Timiskaming	46.84	−78.92			5.2 m_{N}	VI	
1997-11-05	Quebec City, QC	46.75	−71.35	1		5.2 m_{N}		
1989-12-25	Ungava Region	60.12	−73.6			6.0 M_{w}	IV	First shock in eastern North America with surface faulting
1988-11-25	Saguenay	48.12	−71.18			5.9 M_{w}	VII	
1985-12-23	The Nahanni region, NT	62.22	−124.24			6.9 M_{w}		The strongest of a sequence of major earthquakes
1979-02-28	Southern Yukon–Alaska Border	60.59	−141.47			7.2 M_{w}		
1970-06-24	Queen Charlotte Islands, BC	51.77	−130.76			7.4 M_{w}		
1958-07-09	Lituya Bay, Alaska	58.6	−137.10	5		7.8 M_{w}	XI	Rockfall caused a megatsunami (524 m (1,719 ft) runup)
1949-08-22	Queen Charlotte Islands, BC	53.62	−133.27			8.1 M_{w}	VIII	Non-destructive tsunami
1946-06-23	Vancouver Island, BC	49.75	−124.5	2		7.5 M_{w}	VIII	
1944-09-05	Cornwall, ON/Massena, NY	44.96	−74.83			5.8 M_{w}	VII	
1935-11-01	Timiskaming	46.78	−79.07			6.1 M_{w}	VII	
1933-11-20	Baffin Bay	73.12	−70.01			7.4 M_{w}		Largest known earthquake north of the Arctic Circle
1929-11-18	Grand Banks of Newfoundland (Note: In 1929, Newfoundland was a Dominion of the British Empire, and had not yet joined Canadian Confederation.)	44.54	−56.01	27–28		7.2 M_{w}	VIII	Underwater slump caused destructive tsunami
1929-05-26	Queen Charlotte Islands, BC	51.51	−130.74			7.0 M_{w}		
1925-03-01	Charlevoix–Kamouraska, QC	47.8	−69.8			6.2 M_{w}	VIII	
1918-12-06	Vancouver Island, BC	49.44	−126.22			7.2 M_{w}	VII	
1899-09-10	Yukon–Alaska border	60.00	−140.00			8.2–8.4 M_{s}		Part of a complex and not well understood sequence
1899-09-04	Yukon–Alaska border	60.00	-140.00			8.2–8.5 M_{s}		Part of a complex and not well understood sequence
1872-12-15	Washington State	47.9	−120.3			6.5–7.0 M_{w}	VIII	
1870-10-20	Charlevoix, QC	47.4	−70.5	6		6.5		
1860-10-17	Charlevoix, QC	47.5	−70.1			6.0		
1791-12-06	Charlevoix	47.4	−70.5			6.0		
1732-09-16	Montreal, QC	45.5	−73.6	0–1		5.8 M_{w}	VIII–IX	
1700-01-26	Pacific Northwest	45.0	−125.0			8.7–9.2 M_{w}		Linked to the destructive "orphan tsunami" in Japan
1663-02-05	Charlevoix–Kamouraska, QC	47.6	−70.1			7.3–7.9 M_{w}	X	
The inclusion criteria for adding events are based on WikiProject Earthquakes' notability essay that was developed for stand alone articles. The principles described are also applicable to lists. In summary, only damaging, injurious, or deadly events should be recorded.

Abbreviations used:

- M_{w} Moment magnitude scale
- M_{L} Richter scale
- M_{s} Surface-wave magnitude scale
- M_{n} Nuttli magnitude scale—a version of the Richter scale specifically for use in eastern North America

== See also ==
- Fracking in Canada
