= Champlain Sea =

Post glacial seaway in eastern North America

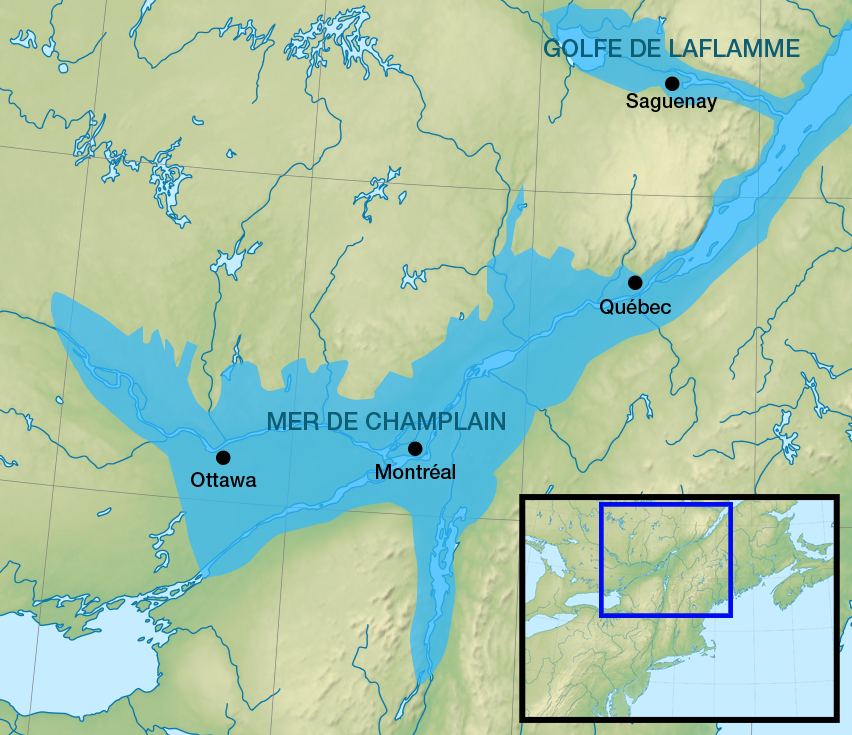
The Champlain Sea

The Champlain Sea (French: Mer de Champlain) was a prehistoric inlet of the Atlantic Ocean into the North American continent, created by the retreating ice sheets during the closure of the last glacial period. The inlet once included lands in what are now the Canadian provinces of Quebec and Ontario, as well as parts of the American states of New York and Vermont. Today, the remains of the sea include the St. Lawrence Seaway, Lake Champlain, Lake of Two Mountains on the lower Ottawa River, and the lower Saguenay River, as well as other lakes, islands and shores.

== Origins ==
The mass of ice from the continental ice sheets had depressed the rock beneath it over millennia. At the end of the last glacial period, while the rock was still depressed, the Saint Lawrence and Ottawa River valleys, as well as modern Lake Champlain, at that time Lake Vermont, were below sea level and flooded with rising worldwide sea levels, once the ice no longer prevented the ocean from flowing into the region. As the land gradually rose again, in the process known as isostatic rebound, the sea coast gradually retreated to its current location.

The sea lasted from about 13,000 years ago to about 10,000 years ago and was continuously shrinking during that time, since the rebounding continent was slowly rising above sea level. At its peak, the sea extended inland as far south as Lake Champlain and somewhat farther west than the city of Ottawa, Ontario, and farther up the Ottawa River past Pembroke. At one time Glacial Lake Iroquois became an arm of the Champlain Sea called Gilbert Gulf. The remaining glaciers fed the sea during that time, making it more brackish than typical seawater. It is estimated that the sea was as much as 150 metres (490 ft) above the level of today's Saint Lawrence and Ottawa Rivers.

== Geological evidence ==
The best evidence of this former sea is the vast clay plain deposited along the Ottawa and St. Lawrence Rivers. This resulted in distinctive forest types, and large wetlands. Other modern evidence of the sea can be seen in the form of fossils of whales (belugas, fin whales, and bowhead whales), walruses and other pinnipeds, and marine shells that have been found near the cities of Ottawa, Ontario, and Montreal, Quebec. There are also fossils of oceanic fish such as capelin. The Sea also left ancient raised shorelines in the former coastal regions, and the Leda clay deposits in areas of deeper water.

The northern shore of the lake was in southern Quebec where outcrops of the Canadian Shield form Eardley Escarpment. This escarpment still has distinctive plants that may date back to the era when the sea existed. The Eardley Escarpment is known locally as the Gatineau Hills. It is part of the Mattawa fault at the southeastern edge of the Ottawa-Bonnechere Graben, in Eastern Ontario and the Outaouais region of Quebec, more commonly known as the Ottawa Valley.

== See also ==
- Lake Hitchcock
- Lake Albany
- Wisconsin glaciation
- Saint Lawrence Rift System
