= 1935 Timiskaming earthquake =

Earthquake in Canada

1935 Temiskamingue earthquake
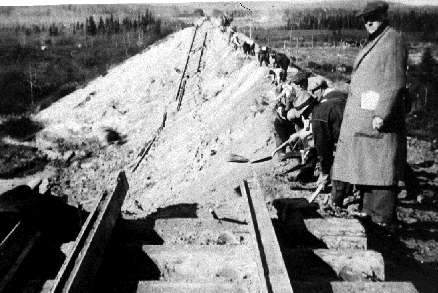
- Collapsed railroad embankment at Parent

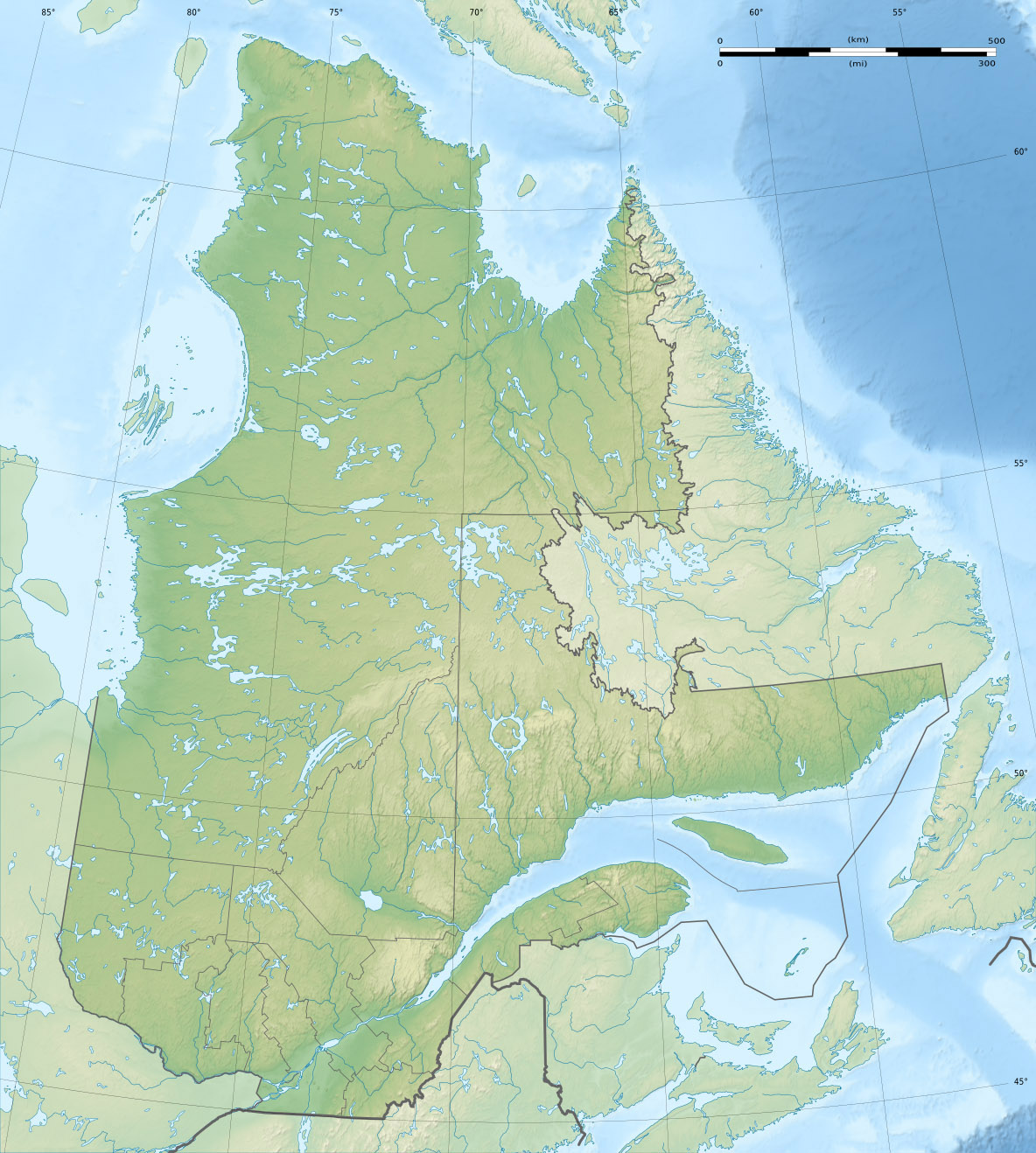
- Location within Quebec Location within Canada
- UTC time: 1935-11-01 06:03:37
- ISC event: 904623
- USGS-ANSS: ComCat
- Local date: November 1, 1935
- Local time: 1:03 a.m. ET
- Magnitude: 6.1 M_{w}
- Depth: 60 km (37 mi) (ISC); 15 km (9.3 mi) (USGS)
- Epicenter: 46.78°N 79.07°W
- Areas affected: Canada
- Max. intensity: MMI VII (Very strong)

The 1935 Temiskamingue earthquake occurred on November 1 with a moment magnitude of 6.1 and a maximum Mercalli intensity of VII (Very strong). The event took place in the Western Quebec seismic zone in the Abitibi-Témiscamingue region of Quebec.

== Earthquake ==
The earthquake was a result of movement on a moderately dipping thrust fault, interpreted to represent reactivation of one of the extensional faults associated with the Timiskaming Graben. It had an epicentre approximately 10 km (6.2 mi) northeast of Témiscaming, Quebec. It occurred at 1:03 a.m. ET, the earthquake was felt over a wide swath of North America, extending west to Fort William (now Thunder Bay), east to Fredericton, New Brunswick, north to James Bay and south as far as Kentucky and West Virginia. Occasional aftershocks were reported for several months.

== Damage ==
Although the most significant damage connected to the earthquake was to chimneys, both in the immediate area and as far south as North Bay and Mattawa, a railroad embankment near Parent, 300 km (190 mi) away, also collapsed. Researcher E. A. Hodgson later concluded that the embankment slide was already imminent, and was merely hastened by the vibrations. Some rockfalls and structural cracks were also reported, although there were few major structural collapses aside from the Parent embankment. The relative lack of major damage, despite the fact that it was a strong earthquake, has been attributed primarily to the sparseness of the area's population.

== Other events ==
The 2000 Kipawa earthquake on January 1, with a magnitude of 5.2, had its epicentre at Lake Kipawa, very near the epicentre of the 1935 quake.

== See also ==
- List of earthquakes in 1935
- List of earthquakes in Canada
