= 1925 Charlevoix–Kamouraska earthquake =

Severe earthquake in Quebec, Canada

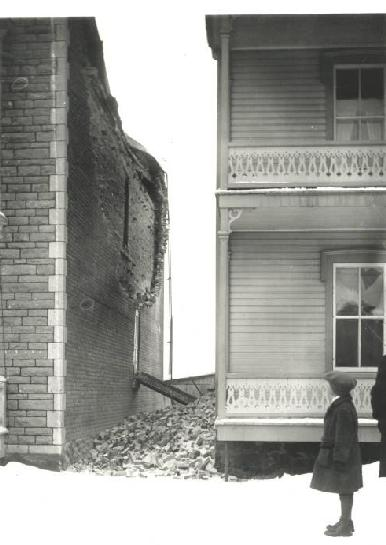

- Location within Quebec
- UTC time: 1925-03-01 02:19:20
- ISC event: 910394
- USGS-ANSS: ComCat
- Local date: February 28, 1925
- Local time: 21:19:20
- Magnitude: 6.2 M_{w}
- Depth: 10 km (6 mi)
- Epicenter: 47.8°N 69.8°W
- Areas affected: Canada, United States
- Max. intensity: MMI VIII (Severe)
- Aftershocks: 55

The 1925 Charlevoix–Kamouraska earthquake struck northeastern North America on February 28, reaching 6.2 on the moment magnitude scale. It was one of the most powerful measured in Canada in the 20th century, with a maximum perceived intensity of VIII (Severe) on the Mercalli intensity scale at its epicentre in the area of Charlevoix-Kamouraska along the Saint Lawrence River near île aux Lièvres and not greater than VI (Strong) in the United States. The quake was felt in Quebec City, Shawinigan, and Montreal in Canada, and as far south in the U.S. as Virginia, and as far west as the Mississippi River.

== Damage ==
It caused damage in three separate areas. The first had extreme damage constricted to a narrow belt 20 miles (32 km) long on both shores of the Saint Lawrence River near the epicentre. In this area, damage at the villages of Baie-Saint-Paul, Saint-Urbain, Les Éboulements, Pointe-au-Pic, La Malbaie, Tadoussac and the other nearby villages of Sainte-Anne-de-la-Pocatière, Saint-Pacôme, Rivière-Ouelle, Saint-Philippe, Saint-Denis, and Saint-Pascal on the south shore, was mostly related to the magnitude of the earthquake itself, and to some extent by the deep grainy soil on which many of the destroyed buildings were built. The two other damaged areas were Quebec City and in the Trois-Rivières – Shawinigan area, where the destruction was more extensive, not so much due to the strength of the earthquake, but rather to the uneven nature of the landscape.

== Aftermath ==
A total of 55 aftershocks were recorded, which lasted for weeks, ranging from magnitude 5 to 2. Over the years, several studies were published on the 1925 Charlevoix–Kamouraska earthquake, some as recently as 1999. A foreshock occurred in the St. Lawrence valley the prior year on September 30. It was rated at 6.1 and was felt from Rockland, Ontario to Portland, Maine.

== See also ==
- Charlevoix seismic zone
- List of earthquakes in 1925
- List of earthquakes in Canada
- List of earthquakes in the United States
