= 1944 Cornwall–Massena earthquake =

Earthquake near the New York–Ontario border

- Location within New York
- UTC time: 1944-09-05 04:38:45
- ISC event: 899531
- USGS-ANSS: ComCat
- Local date: September 5, 1944
- Local time: 12:38:45 am EDT
- Magnitude: 5.8 M_{w}
- Depth: 20 km
- Epicenter: 44.956°N 74.833°W
- Type: Oblique thrust
- Areas affected: United States; Canada
- Total damage: $2 million
- Max. intensity: MMI VIII (Severe)
- Casualties: None

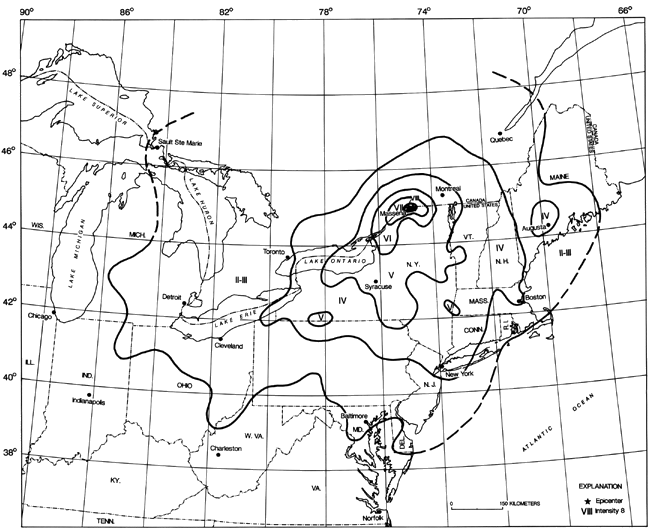
Isoseismal map for the earthquake

The 1944 Cornwall–Massena earthquake occurred on September 5 at 12:38:45 am EDT in Massena, New York. It registered 5.8 on the moment magnitude scale and had a maximum Mercalli intensity of VIII (Severe). This area is part of the Saint Lawrence River Valley and the seismically active zone known as the Saint Lawrence rift system. The earthquake is the largest known in New York's recorded history and was felt over great distances.

== Damage ==
The earthquake was felt as far away as New York City, Quebec City, Toronto, and Boston. It caused property damage of $2 million (equivalent to $37 million in 2025). Several large aftershocks were felt in the general area, described as a low rumble followed by a loud bang.

In the village of Massena, New York, approximately 90 percent of its chimneys were destroyed or damaged, along with heavy damage to masonry structures. It was also reported that cracks appeared in the ground around the town of Hogansburg, located 10 miles (16 km) east of Massena. There were also reports of wells that dried up, and a crack in a deep alluvium north of Massena Center oozed water and sand.

Damage to the city of Cornwall, Ontario, was heavier due to a denser population and its geological location; many structures' foundations were built on sand. Cornwall Collegiate and Vocational School received heavy damage from masonry work falling through the roof of the gymnasium.

== Epicenter ==
The epicenter was located in the vicinity of Massena Center, a small hamlet located 3.5 miles (6 km) east of the village of Massena. The research was taken from inspecting the local graveyards which had seen the damage done in the form of headstones rotating on their foundations.

In the city of Cornwall, the French Cemetery, Saint Columban's Cemetery, and Woodlawn Cemetery were inspected and found that the headstones had turned counter-clockwise. In the town of Massena, Calvary Cemetery and Massena Center Cemetery were inspected and found the headstones had turned clockwise. Its epicenter was determined to have been located in the hamlet of Massena Center due to the greater damage of the hamlet itself and the severe rotation found in the cemetery. All chimneys received severe damage along with several reports of foundation damage.

== See also ==
- List of earthquakes in 1944
- List of earthquakes in the United States
