= Saguenay Graben =

Rift valley in the geological Grenville Province of southern Quebec, Canada

Coordinates: 48°30′N 71°20′W

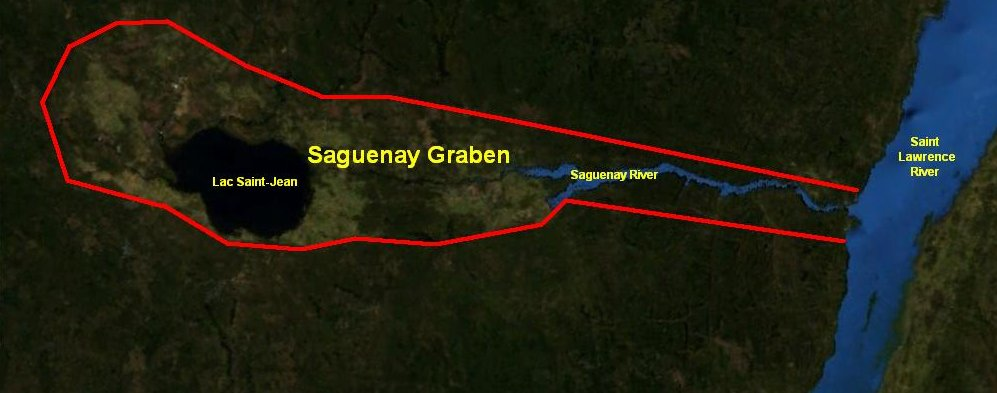
Map of the Saguenay Graben

The Saguenay Graben is a rift valley or graben in the geological Grenville Province of southern Quebec, Canada. It is an elongated flat-bottomed basin 250 km (155 mi) long and 50 km (31 mi) wide, bounded by normal faults running parallel to its length.

== Formation of the Saguenay Graben ==
The time of formation of the faults related to the Saguenay Graben is still under debate because it is difficult to accurately measure the age of faulting. Evidence suggests it was either the opening of the Iapetus Ocean (600–400 Ma), or the opening of the Atlantic Ocean (195–170 Ma) that caused the faulting.

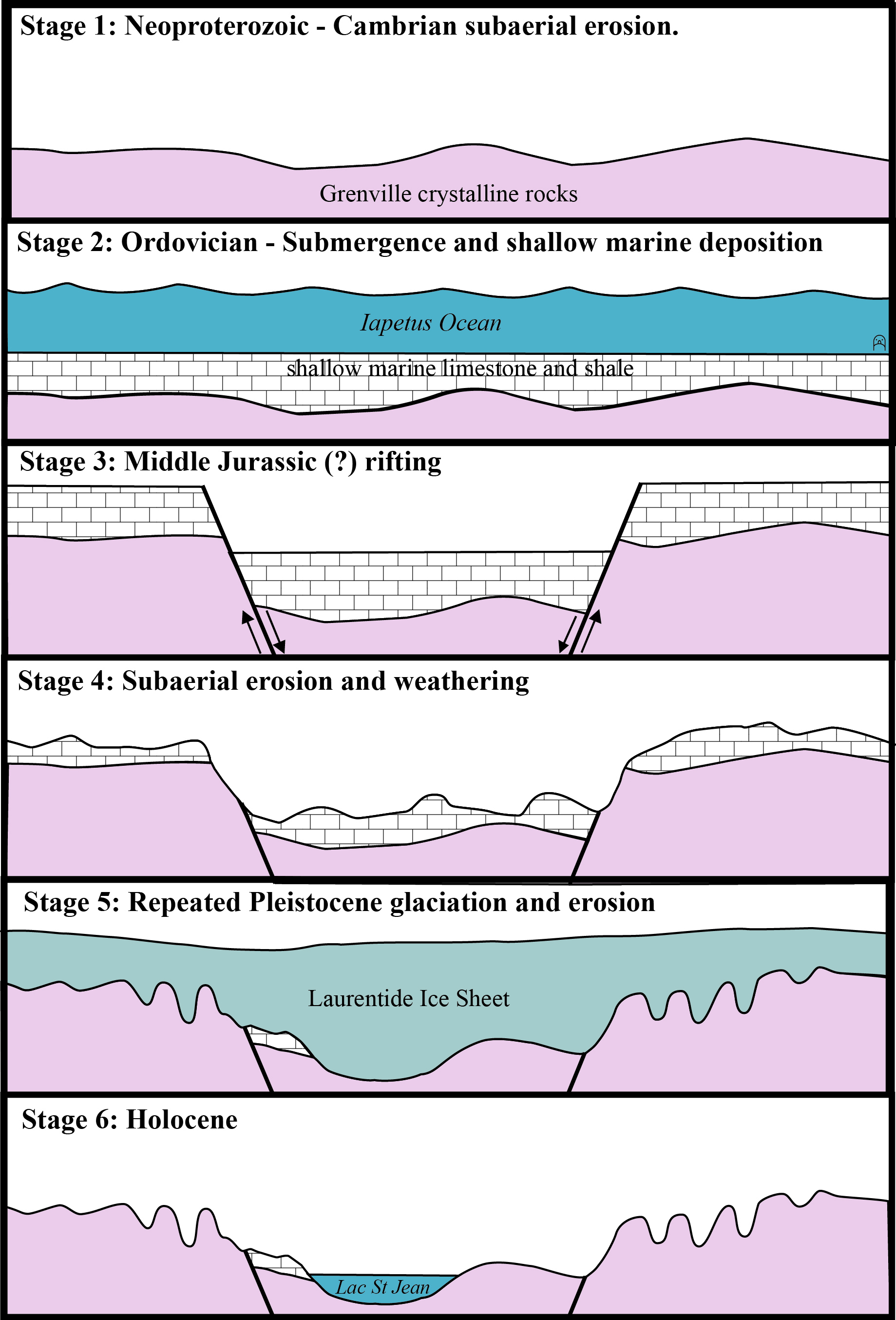
Schematic geologic cross section of Lac Saint Jean and enclosing Saguenay Graben illustrating the major stages in their geologic development

During the opening of one of these oceans, fragmentation of the landmass occurred creating two fault planes, one to the north and one to the south. The resulting bedrock between dropped down along the normal faults, creating the Saguenay Graben. The extent of these faults are only known at the surface and therefore their extension and shape at depth is unknown.

The faults associated with the Saguenay Graben have been the source for earthquakes, including the 1988 Saguenay earthquake.

== Glaciations ==
The area was covered by ice sheets several times throughout the Pleistocene. The graben was located relatively parallel to the ice sheet movement and therefore caused it to become a preferred travel pathway for ice.

The glaciers cut into the graben and widened it in some places as well as making it considerably deeper in others. After the retreat of the final ice sheet, there was considerable isostatic rebound. The total amount of rebound varied from 140 m (459 ft) on the north side and 120 m (394 ft) on the south side.

== Present day geography ==
The lowlands within the graben have an altitude of between 100 and 200 m (328 and 656 ft). To the east there is the Kenogami threshold which is characterized by having an altitude of 200 to 260 m (656 to 853 ft). This threshold splits the graben into two physiographic regions; the Lac Saint-Jean region to the west and the Saguenay region to the east. The plateau around the Graben is between 200 and 800 m (656 and 2,625 ft) in altitude. The Saguenay River as well as the Lac Saint-Jean are both contained within the Saguenay Graben.

== Local geology ==
The Saguenay Graben is in the Grenville Province (but was created long after the Grenville Orogeny). The Saguenay Graben is characterized primarily by the rock types: gneiss, anorthosite and granite that are Proterozoic in age. There are two outliers of limestone and shale of the Paleozoic that are found only in the graben due to its faulting.
