= Charlevoix impact structure =

Asteroid impact site in Quebec, Canada

- Charlevoix crater
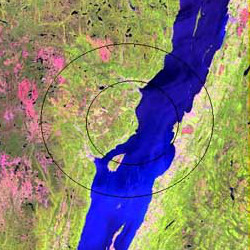
- Landsat image of the impact structure. The inner circle marks an early estimate of the diameter; the outer circle indicates a more recent size estimate

- Location within Canada Location within Quebec
- Location: Charlevoix, Quebec, Canada; 47°32′N 70°18′W

Impact crater structure
- Confidence: Confirmed
- Diameter: 54 km (34 mi)
- Age: 450 ± 20 Ma; Ordovician to Silurian age
- Exposed: Yes
- Drilled: Yes
- Bolide type: Stony meteorite

The Charlevoix impact structure is a large eroded meteorite impact structure in the Charlevoix region of Quebec, Canada. Only part of the impact structure is exposed at the surface, the rest lying beneath the Saint Lawrence River.

== Description ==
The original impact structure is estimated to have been 54 kilometres (34 mi) in diameter and the age of the impact is estimated to be 450 ± 20 million years (Ordovician to Silurian age). The projectile was probably a stony asteroid, at least 2 kilometres (1.2 mi) in diameter, and weighing an estimated 15 billion tonnes (17 billion short tons). The Mont des Éboulements, situated in the exact centre of the impact structure, is interpreted as the central uplift, a consequence of elastic rebound. The impact structure is classified as a multi-ringed basin with a central uplift.

The impact origin of Charlevoix impact structure was first realized in 1965 after the discovery of many shatter cones in the area. Other evidence for impact includes planar deformation features (PDFs) in quartz and feldspar grains.

In contrast to the surrounding craggy Laurentian Mountains, the impact structure is relatively smooth and flat, which has facilitated human settlement. Today, 90% of the people of Charlevoix live within this impact structure.
