= Painchaud =

Painchaud is a surname. Notable people with the surname include:

- Charles-François Painchaud (1782–1838), Canadian Roman Catholic priest and educator
- Charles-François Painchaud (1815–1891), Canadian physician and politician
- Jonathan Painchaud (born 1974), Canadian singer-songwriter
