= Verchères (Province of Canada electoral district) =

Electoral district in former Province of Canada

Verchères Canada East
Province of Canada electoral district

Defunct pre-Confederation electoral district
- Legislature: Legislative Assembly of the Province of Canada
- District created: 1841
- District abolished: 1867
- First contested: 1841
- Last contested: 1863

Verchères was an electoral district of the Legislative Assembly of the Parliament of the Province of Canada, in Canada East, primarily south of Montreal. It was created in 1841, based on the previous electoral district of the same name for the Legislative Assembly of Lower Canada.

In 1853, the provincial Parliament redrew the electoral map. The boundaries for Verchères were altered to some extent in the new map, which came into force for the 1854 general elections.

Verchères was represented by one member in the Legislative Assembly. It was abolished in 1867, upon the creation of Canada and the province of Quebec.

== Boundaries ==
Verchères electoral district was located primarily south of Montreal, on the south shore of the Saint Lawrence River and bordered by the Richelieu River (now in the Montérégie administrative district).

=== 1841 to 1854 ===
The Union Act, 1840 merged the two provinces of Upper Canada and Lower Canada into the Province of Canada, with a single Parliament. The separate parliaments of Lower Canada and Upper Canada were abolished. The Union Act provided that the pre-existing electoral boundaries of Lower Canada and Upper Canada would continue to be used in the new Parliament, unless altered by the Union Act itself.

The Lower Canada electoral district of Verchères was not altered by the Act. It was therefore continued with the same boundaries in the new Parliament. Those boundaries had been set by a statute of Lower Canada in 1829:

The County of Verchères shall be bounded on the north west by the River Saint Lawrence, on the south east by the River Richelieu or Chambly, on the south west by the seigniories of Boucherville, Montarville and Chambly, and on the north east by that part of the south west boundary of the seigniory of Saint Ours between the River Saint Lawrence and the River Richelieu, comprising all the Islands in the said River Saint Lawrence, and the said River Richelieu or Chambly, in front of and nearest to the said County, in whole or in part fronting the same; which County so bounded comprehends the Seigniories of Contrecour, Bellevue, Verchères, Saint Blain, Guillodière, La Trinité or Cap Saint Michel, Varennes, Beloeil and its augmentation, Cournoyer and all the Islands in the said River Saint Lawrence opposite the same, Isle Bouchard excepted.

=== 1854 to 1867 ===
In 1853, the Parliament of the Province of Canada passed a new electoral map. The boundaries of Verchères were altered to some extent by the new map, which came into force in the general elections of 1854:

The County of Verchères shall be bounded on the north-east by the County of Richelieu as above described, on the north-west by the River Saint Lawrence, on the south-east by the River Richelieu, and on the south-west by the south-eastern limits of the Parishes of Chambly, Saint Bruno and Boucherville, including all Islands in the said Rivers Saint Lawrence and Richelieu nearest to the said County and wholly or in part opposite to the same; the said County so bounded comprising the Parishes of Varennes, Verchères, Contrecœur, Belœil, Saint Marc, Saint Antoine and Sainte Julie.

== Members of the Legislative Assembly (1841–1867) ==
Verchères was a single-member constituency.

The following were the members of the Legislative Assembly for Verchères. The party affiliations are based on the biographies of individual members given by the National Assembly of Quebec, as well as votes in the Legislative Assembly. "Party" was a fluid concept, especially during the early years of the Province of Canada.

Parliament	Members	Years in Office	Party
1st Parliament; 1841–1844	Henri Desrivières (Note: Resigned on November 6, 1841, effective December 27, to allow James Leslie to stand as a candidate: Côté, Political Appointments and Elections, p. 60, note (50); "Biography of Henri Desrivières". Dictionnaire des parlementaires du Québec de 1792 à nos jours (in French). National Assembly of Quebec.)	1841	Anti-unionist; French-Canadian Group
1st Parliament; 1841–1844	James Leslie (Note: Elected in by-election December 28, 1841: Côté, Political Appointments and Elections, p. 60, note (51).)	1841–1844 (by-election)	French-Canadian Group
2nd Parliament; 1844–1847	James Leslie	1844–1847	"English" Liberals
3rd Parliament; 1848–1851	James Leslie (Note: Appointed President of the Privy Council, March 11, 1848; seat vacated automatically on accepting an office of profit under the Crown; subsequently appointed to the Legislative Council: Côté, Political Appointments and Elections, p. 61, note (123).)	1848	"English" Liberals
3rd Parliament; 1848–1851	George-Étienne Cartier	1848–1851 (by-election)	French-Canadian Group
4th Parliament; 1851–1854	George-Étienne Cartier	1851–1861	Ministerialist
5th Parliament; 1854–1857	George-Étienne Cartier	1851–1861	Parti bleu
6th Parliament; 1858–1861	George-Étienne Cartier	1851–1861	Parti bleu
7th Parliament; 1861–1863	Alexandre-Édouard Kierzkowski (Note: Declared elected in 1861; election set aside for want of proper qualifications, May 4, 1863: J.O. Côté, Political Appointments and Elections in the Province of Canada from 1841 to 1865, 2nd ed. (Ottawa: G.E. Desbarats, 1865), p. 116.)	1861–1863	Liberal
7th Parliament; 1861–1863	Charles-François Painchaud (Note: Unsuccessful candidate in 1861 election; when election of Kierzkowski was set aside, Painchaud was declared elected, effective May 4, 1873: Côté, Political Appointments and Elections in the Province of Canada from 1841 to 1865, 2nd ed., p. 11.)	1863	Liberal-Conservative
8th Parliament; 1863–1867	Félix Geoffrion	1863–1867	Anti-Confederation; Rouge

== Abolition ==
The district was abolished on July 1, 1867, when the British North America Act, 1867 came into force, creating Canada and splitting the Province of Canada into Quebec and Ontario. It was succeeded by electoral districts of the same name in the House of Commons of Canada and the Legislative Assembly of Quebec.

== See also ==
- List of elections in the Province of Canada
