= Grand Coteau =

Grand Coteau may refer to:

== Places ==
- Grand Coteau, Louisiana, a town in the United States
- Grand Coteau; former name of Sainte-Julie, Quebec, Canada
- Forêt du Grand Côteau (Grand Coteau Forest), Lorraine, Quebec, Canada
- L'Étang-du-Grand-Coteau (Grand Coteau Pond), Mascouche, Quebec, Canada

=== Facilities and structures ===
- Villa Grand-Coteau, Quebec, Canada; a former building in the Mont-Saint-Bruno National Park
- Grand Coteau Heritage Centre, Shaunavon, Saskatchewan, Canada
- Le Grand Coteau, Noizay, Indre-et-Loire, France; a country estate owned by Francis Poulenc

== Battles ==
- The Battle of Grand Coteau (Battle of Bayou Bourbeux), fought during the American Civil War in 1863
- Battle of Grand Coteau (North Dakota), a battle between Metis and Sioux in 1851

== Other uses ==
- "Grand Coteau", a placename, see List of place names of French origin in the United States

== See also ==
- Grande Côte (disambiguation)
