= François-Pierre Bruneau =

Canadian businessman and lawyer

François-Pierre Bruneau (French pronunciation: [fʁɑ̃swa pjɛʁ bʁyno]; July 24, 1799 – March 4, 1851) was a lawyer, seigneur, businessman and political figure in Canada East.

He was born in Montreal in 1799, the son of François-Xavier Bruneau, and studied at the Petit Séminaire de Montréal. He studied law with Louis-Michel Viger, was called to the bar in 1822 and set up practice in Montreal. In 1829, with Henri Desrivières, he purchased the Montarville seigneury. The partners constructed mills and Bruneau established the village of Saint-Bruno-de-Montarville. By 1839, Bruneau had also acquired the Pierreville seigneury. He also established a manufacturing firm, Bruneau Sleighs. In 1841, he was named to the Legislative Council of the Province of Canada. He was named receiver general in December 1847 and served until March 1848.

He died at Saint-Bruno-de-Montarville in 1851.

Mont Saint-Bruno took its name from Bruneau.

His uncle Pierre Bruneau had served in the legislative assembly for Lower Canada.
