= Henri Desrivières =

Lower Canada seigneur and politician

Member of the Legislative Assembly of the Province of Canada for Verchères
- In office 1841
- Preceded by: New position
- Succeeded by: James Leslie

Personal details
- Born: 1805 (approximately)
- Died: November 12, 1865 Stanbridge, Canada East, Province of Canada
- Party: Anti-unioniste; French-Canadian Group
- Spouse: Marie-Angélique Hay
- Occupation: Seigneurial owner

Henri Desrivières (French pronunciation: [ɑ̃ʁi deʁivjɛʁ]; c. 1805 – November 12, 1865) was a seigneur and political figure in Lower Canada (now Quebec). He represented Verchères in the Legislative Assembly of the Province of Canada in 1841.

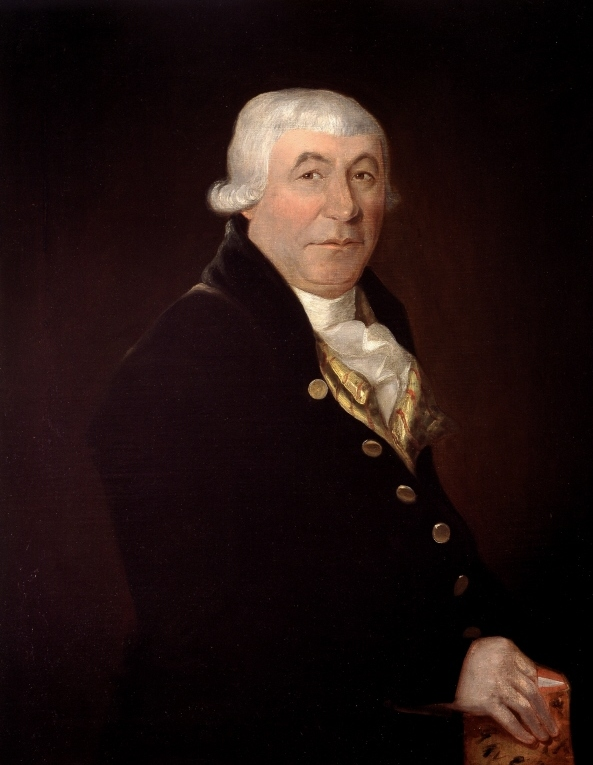
James McGill, a wealthy businessman who married Desrivières's grandmother and bequeathed considerable assets to Desrivières's father

Henri was the son of François Desrivières and Marguerite-Thérèse Trottier Desrivières Beaubien. The family was prosperous. François's father had been involved in the fur trade. When François's father died young, his mother married James McGill, an extremely wealthy businessman who had begun in the fur trade and established himself in a number of other enterprises. When McGill died in 1813, François Desrivières was one of his step-father's main heirs. He inherited £23,000, lands, and future considerations.

At some point, Henri Desrivières married Marie-Angélique Hay, who kept an extensive diary of their family life in the mid-19th century.

In 1829, Henri Desrivières acquired the seigneury of Montarville with François-Pierre Bruneau. Desrivières had already inherited two of the six lots in the seigneury from his mother. In exchange for giving the seller a life annuity, the two partners acquired the other four lots in the seigneury: three for Bruneau, and one for Desrivières, whose share of the purchase price was £650. He also acquired the title of principal seigneur. Bruneau supplied the initial capital, and Desrivières was to undertake the management of the seigneury. The partners planned on major investments in building and operating mills. Bruneau was involved in founding a town in the seigneury, Saint-Bruno-de-Montarville. The seigneury appears to have been highly profitable.

From 1836 to 1840, Desrivières served as judge in the court of special sessions of the peace for the Montreal district. He also was reeve for Missisquoi County.

Desrivières took part in the Lower Canada Rebellion but was never arrested.

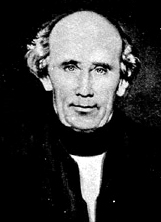
John Neilson, whose motion condemning the union was supported by Desrivières

Following the Lower Canada rebellion, and the similar rebellion in 1837 in Upper Canada (now Ontario), the British government decided to merge the two provinces into a single province, as recommended by Lord Durham in the Durham Report. The Union Act, 1840, passed by the British Parliament, abolished the two provinces and their separate parliaments. It created the Province of Canada, with a single Parliament for the entire province, composed of an elected Legislative Assembly and an appointed Legislative Council. The Governor General initially retained a strong position in the government.

The first general elections for the new Legislative Assembly were held in the spring of 1841. Desrivières stood for election in the riding of Verchères. Campaigning against the union, he was elected by acclamation.

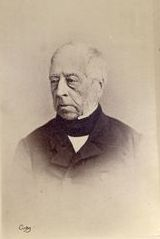
James Leslie, who was elected for Verchères after Desrivières resigned his seat

In the first session of the new Parliament, the union of the Canadas was the major issue. One of the leaders of the French-Canadian Group, John Neilson, introduced a motion condemning the way the union had been imposed on Lower Canada. Desrivières was one of the members of the French-Canadian Group. He voted in favour of the motion, and against the union. The motion nonetheless failed. For the rest of the session, Desrivières was a consistent opponent of the Governor General, Lord Sydenham.

After the end of the 1841 session, Desrivières resigned his seat to allow James Leslie to run for a seat in the Assembly. Leslie had had a long career as a member of the Legislative Assembly of Lower Canada, first as a member of the Parti canadien and then the Parti patriote. However, he had been defeated when he stood for election from Montreal in the 1841 general elections. In the by-election after Desrivières resigned the seat, Leslie was elected as the next member for Verchères. He joined the French-Canadian Group in the subsequent sessions of the Assembly.

Desrivières took no further part in politics, spending the rest of his life at his estate at Stanbridge. He died at Stanbridge in 1865.

== See also ==
1st Parliament of the Province of Canada
