= James Leslie (Canadian politician) =

Canadian merchant, banker and politician

The Honourable James Leslie
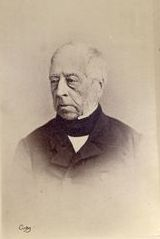
- Senator James Leslie

Member of the Legislative Assembly of Lower Canada for Montreal East
- In office 1824 – 1838 (four elections) Serving with Hugues Heney (1824–1832); Antoine-Olivier Berthelet (1832–1834); Joseph Roy (1834–1838)
- Preceded by: Thomas Thain
- Succeeded by: None; constitution suspended

Member of the Legislative Assembly of the Province of Canada for Verchères
- In office 1841–1848 (one by-election and two general elections)
- Preceded by: Henri Desrivières
- Succeeded by: George-Étienne Cartier

Member of the Legislative Council of the Province of Canada
- In office 1848–1867

President of the Executive Council of the Province of Canada
- In office 11 March 1848 – 14 September 1848
- Preceded by: William Morris
- Succeeded by: William Hamilton Merritt

Provincial Secretary of the Province of Canada
- In office 1848–1851
- Preceded by: Robert Baldwin Sullivan
- Succeeded by: Augustin-Norbert Morin

Senator for Alma, Quebec
- In office 23 October 1867 – 6 December 1873
- Appointed by: Royal Proclamation
- Preceded by: New position
- Succeeded by: Edward Goff Penny

Personal details
- Born: 4 September 1786 Kair, Kincardineshire, Scotland
- Died: 6 December 1873 (aged 87) Montreal, Quebec, Canada
- Party: Lower Canada: Parti canadien, then Parti Patriote; Province of Canada: French-Canadian Group, "English" Liberal; Canada: Conservative
- Spouse: Julia Langan
- Children: at least 1 son
- Education: (1) Marischal College, Aberdeen (2) University of Aberdeen
- Occupation: Merchant, banker

Military service
- Allegiance: Britain
- Branch/service: Lower Canada militia
- Years of service: 1812 to 1815
- Rank: Retired in 1862 with rank of Lieutenant-Colonel
- Battles/wars: War of 1812

James Leslie (4 September 1786 – 6 December 1873) was a Canadian businessman and political figure. An immigrant from Scotland in 1804, he became a successful Montreal businessman and was one of the founders of the Bank of Montreal.

He was active in Canadian politics for half a century, particularly as a member of the LaFontaine–Baldwin ministry from 1848 to 1851, the first Province of Canada government selected under the principle of responsible government.

He was first elected to the Legislative Assembly of Lower Canada in 1824, holding the seat until dissolution of the constitution of Lower Canada in 1838. He was a member of the Legislative Assembly of the Province of Canada from 1841 to 1848, and then a member of the Legislative Council until Canadian Confederation in 1867. He was one of the first members appointed to the Senate of Canada in 1867.

He died in office in 1873.

== Family and early life ==
Leslie was born in Kair, Kincardineshire, Scotland, in 1786. His father, Captain James Leslie, had been an assistant quartermaster in the British Army who served with General James Wolfe at Quebec City in 1759. Young James studied at Marischal College and the University of Aberdeen and came to Lower Canada in 1804, where he entered into business. He was an officer in the local militia and served during the War of 1812.

In 1815 he married Julia Langan, daughter of Patrick Langan, owner of the seigneuries of Bourchemin, Ramesay, and Lake Matapédia. The couple had at least one son.

== Business activities ==
In 1809, Leslie opened his own food wholesale company in Montreal, called James Leslie and Company. A good businessman, he achieved rapid success and became a leading member of the Montreal business community. In addition to his business activities in Montreal, he was actively managing the three seigneuries inherited by his wife.

Leslie was one of the founders of the Bank of Montreal. He served as a director from 1817 to 1829, and emphasised a professional business approach, rather than running it as a family business.

== Political career ==
=== Lower Canada ===
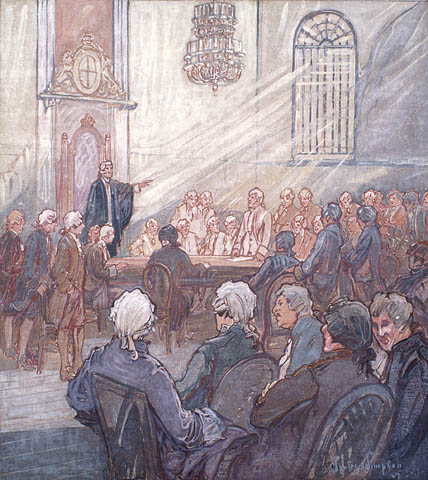
Legislative Assembly of Lower Canada, meeting in the Bishop's Chapel, Quebec

Leslie entered politics in 1824, elected to represent Montreal East in the Legislative Assembly of Lower Canada. He held the seat from 1824 to 1838, when the British government suspended the constitution of Lower Canada after the Lower Canada Rebellion.

He supported the Parti canadien, largely composed of French-Canadian members. They sought greater popular control of the provincial government, which was dominated by the governor, appointed by the British government, and by the Legislative Council, which was appointed by the governor and largely drawn from the British commercial elite of the province. The Parti canadien focused particularly on gaining control of the provincial finances. Leslie's support of the Parti canadien earned him some hostility from the Montreal business community, which was dominated by British Canadians.

In the 1830s, the party transitioned to the more radical, republican Parti patriote. Leslie continued to support it, but tended to be on the more moderate side of the party. He nonetheless voted in favour of the Ninety-Two Resolutions, which Louis-Joseph Papineau introduced in the Legislative Assembly. The Resolutions were highly critical of the constitutional structure of the province. The Assembly passed them in February 1834.

In March 1834, the British government rejected the proposals set out in the Ninety-Two Resolutions and instead passed the Russell Resolutions, which would give the governor complete control of the provincial finances. From that point on, rebellion was in the air in Lower Canada, finally breaking out in November 1837, led by Papineau. Leslie did not support the Lower Canada Rebellion, and was one of the more moderate group of public figures, led by Louis-Hippolyte LaFontaine, who approached Governor General Lord Gosford and asked that the Parliament be recalled. The Governor General refused the request and instead proclaimed martial law in Montreal.

In a letter to LaFontaine in January 1838, Leslie correctly predicted that the outcome of the Rebellion would be a forced union of Lower Canada with Upper Canada. In March 1838, the British government suspended the constitution of Lower Canada and instituted government by the Special Council of Lower Canada, whose members were appointed by the Governor General. Leslie lost his position as a member of the Assembly as a result.

=== Province of Canada ===
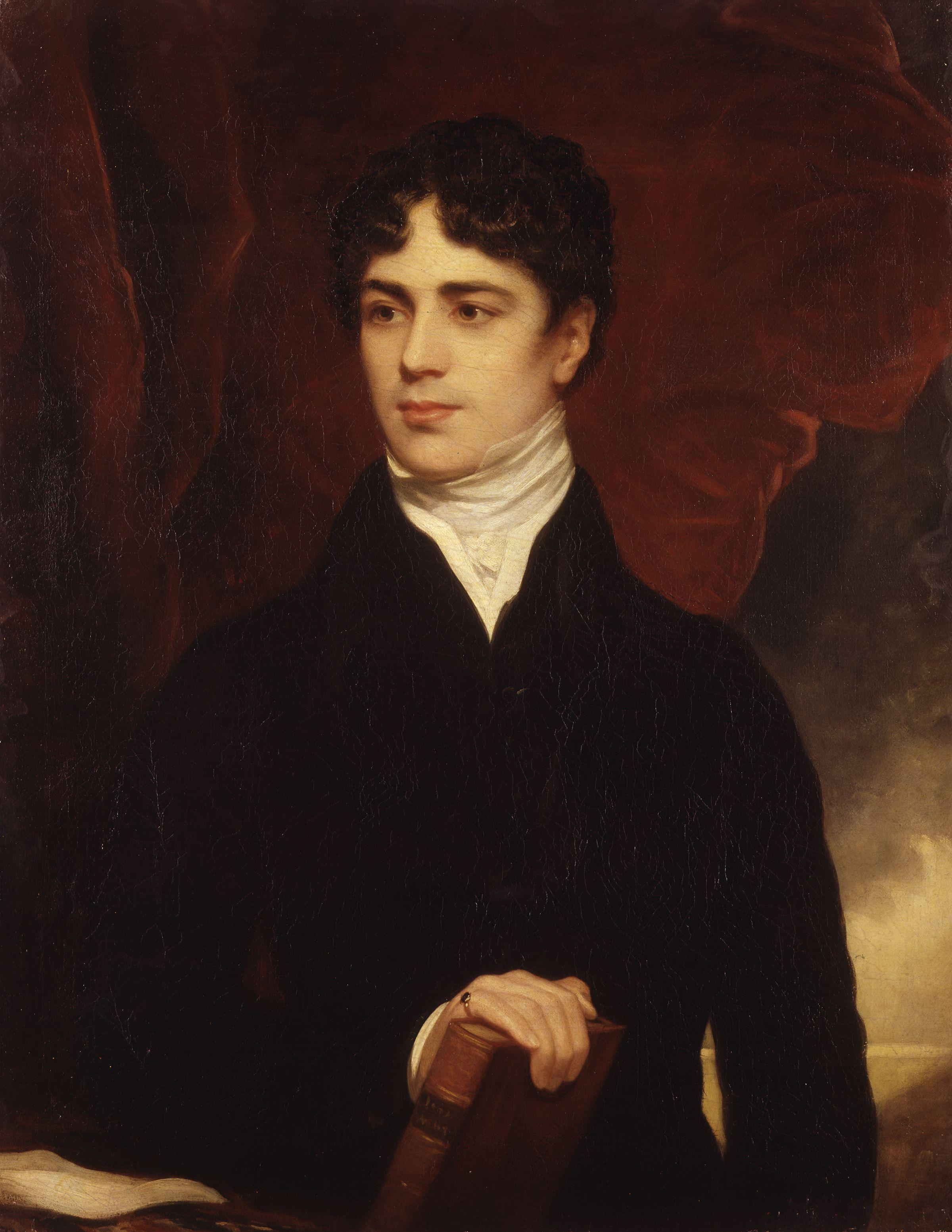
Lord Durham, who recommended the union of the two Canadas

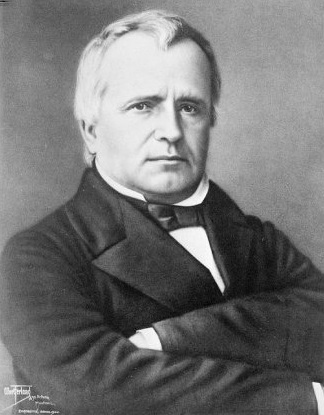
Louis-Hippolyte LaFontaine, leader of the French-Canadian Group

Following the rebellion in Lower Canada, and the similar rebellion in 1837 in Upper Canada (now Ontario), the British government decided to merge the two provinces into a single province, as recommended by Lord Durham in the Durham Report. The Union Act, 1840, passed by the British Parliament, abolished the two provinces and their separate parliaments. It created the Province of Canada, with a single Parliament for the entire province, composed of an elected Legislative Assembly and an appointed Legislative Council. The Governor General initially retained a strong position in the government.

Leslie supported the concept of union, but on two conditions: that representation in the Parliament be based on population, and that Lower Canada would not be required to pay the heavy public debt of Upper Canada. The Union Act went against both those principles. Upper Canada and Lower Canada had equal representation in the new Legislative Assembly, even though the population of Lower Canada was greater in 1840. As well, the public debts of the two provinces were merged and the new Province of Canada was liable for both, meaning the residents of Lower Canada were paying a proportionately greater share of the debt.

As a result, Leslie opposed the union. He stood as a candidate in Montreal County in the first general elections in 1841, but there was extreme electoral violence, which was not uncommon at that time. A group of French-Canadians seized the poll, and two supporters of the union, one Irish, were battered to death. In response, a group of Irish workers came out to take back the poll. The authorities refused to send any militia to restore order. Leslie conceded the election to avoid further violence, and the Tory candidate, Alexandre-Maurice Delisle, was elected. However, in late 1841, the member for the Verchères riding, south of Montreal, resigned his seat, allowing Leslie to be a candidate in the subsequent by-election. This time, Leslie was elected to the Legislative Assembly.

In the Assembly, Leslie was a member of the French-Canadian Group. It was led by LaFontaine, who had formed an alliance with Reformers from Upper Canada, led by Robert Baldwin. Together, the two leaders worked for the implementation of responsible government, to establish popular electoral control over the provincial government. Leslie supported them in their disputes with the Governor General.

Leslie was re-elected in the general elections of 1844 and 1848. The reform alliance of LaFontaine and Baldwin was defeated in the 1844 elections and formed the main opposition, but in 1848, they won majorities in both Upper Canada and Lower Canada. Consistent with the principles of responsible government, Governor General Lord Elgin called on them to form a government. In office, they appointed Leslie to the Executive Council, first as President of the Executive Council, and later as Provincial Secretary. He held the second position for the duration of the LaFontaine–Baldwin government, from 1848 to 1851.

Under the law as it then stood, a member of the Assembly who was named to an office of profit under the Crown, such as ministerial positions, was required to resign their seat in the Assembly and seek re-election from their constituents. However, in Leslie's case, LaFontaine and Baldwin instead appointed him to the Legislative Council, a lifetime appointment. He sat in the Legislative Council until it was abolished as part of Canadian Confederation in 1867.

=== Senate of Canada ===
The Quebec Conference of 1864 was the major meeting of leaders from British North America leading to Confederation. They produced the Quebec Resolutions, which formed the basis for the British North America Act, 1867 (now named the Constitution Act, 1867). As part of their framework for the new country, they provided that the upper house of the new Parliament, the Senate of Canada, would be formed by appointment, not election. The first group of senators would be drawn from the Legislative Councils of the Province of Canada, Nova Scotia, and New Brunswick.

Leslie was one of the original senators appointed under this process. In 1867, he was named to the Senate by the royal proclamation issued under the British North America Act, 1867. He sat as a member of the Conservative party.

== Later life and death ==
Leslie's son married a daughter of Alexandre-Maurice Delisle, who had defeated Leslie in the Montreal County riding in the 1841 general elections.

Leslie continued in the local militia, retiring in 1862 with the rank of lieutenant-colonel.

He died in Montreal in 1873.

The Township of Leslie (formerly part of Leslie-Clapham-et-Huddersfield, now part of Otter Lake) in Quebec was named in his honour.

== Archives ==
There is a James Leslie and family fonds at Library and Archives Canada.
