= Grande Côte (disambiguation) =

Grande Côte is a stretch of coastline in the West African country of Senegal.

Grande Côte or Grand Cote, may also refer to:

- Montée de la Grande Côte, a street of La Croix-Rousse quarter in Lyon, France
- Grande Côte, a Chablis cru vineyard
- Grand Cote National Wildlife Refuge, a waterfowl refuge in Avoyelles Parish, Louisiana, United States

== See also ==
- Grand Coteau (disambiguation)
- Grande (disambiguation)
