= Pierre Bruneau (politician) =

Canadian politician (1761–1820)

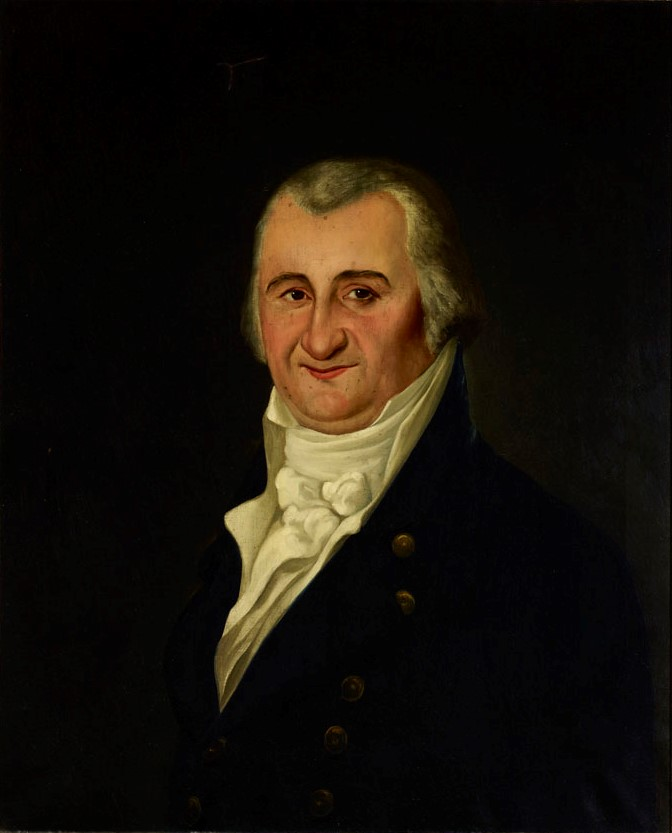

Member of the Legislative Assembly of Lower Canada for the Lower Town of Quebec
- In office 1810–1816

Personal details
- Born: July 22, 1761 Quebec, Colony of Canada
- Died: April 13, 1820 (aged 58) Quebec, Lower Canada
- Party: Parti Canadien
- Spouse: Marie-Anne Robitaille
- Children: Julie Bruneau
- Occupation: Merchant, Politician

Pierre Bruneau (French pronunciation: [pjɛʁ bʁyno]; July 22, 1761 – April 13, 1820) was a merchant and political figure in Lower Canada.

== Biography ==
He was born in the town of Quebec in 1761, the son of a merchant involved in the fur trade, and studied at the Petit Séminaire de Québec. In 1785, he married Marie-Anne Robitaille. In 1786, he took over the family business after his father returned to Poitiers in France; Bruneau opened a second store in Chambly and expanded into the trade in grain, cloth and alcohol. He also invested in property. In 1792, Bruneau joined the local militia, serving as a major during the War of 1812. In 1807, he hired Charles Labbé to manufacture articles made from fur that Bruneau then sold. He was elected to the Legislative Assembly of Lower Canada for the Lower Town of Quebec in 1810; he was reelected in 1814. In 1816, he was defeated in that riding but elected in Kent and reelected there in 1820. Like many members of the parti canadien, Bruneau was opposed to judges sitting in the legislative assembly.

He died in office at Quebec in 1820.

His daughter Julie married Louis-Joseph Papineau. His nephew François-Pierre Bruneau later served as a member of the legislative council for the Province of Canada.
