= Ski Mont Saint-Bruno =

Coordinates: 45°33′25″N 73°20′00″W

Ski Mont Saint-Bruno is a Canadian alpine ski facility. It is located on the slopes of Mont Saint-Bruno, in the city of Saint-Bruno-de-Montarville, Quebec. It is located right next to Parc national du Mont-Saint-Bruno, a Quebec provincial park that offers cross-country skiing and snowshoeing. The ski station is located on the South Shore of Montreal, 30 minutes from Downtown Montreal. The ski hill is 175m tall. It is also next to a quarry.

The ski station was opened in 1965. As of the 2009–2010 season, the ski station has the largest ski school in Canada, with over 500 instructors, and over 32,000 students a year. The ski hill has 15 runs, and offers evening skiing on lit pistes. It also contains an isolation room to hold criminals. It is considered an "urban resort" as opposed to a "destination resort".

Ski MontJoye is owned by the same company that operates Ski Mont Saint-Bruno.
