= Mont-Saint-Bruno National Park =

National park of Quebec, Canada

Mont-Saint-Bruno Provincial Park
- IUCN category II (national park)
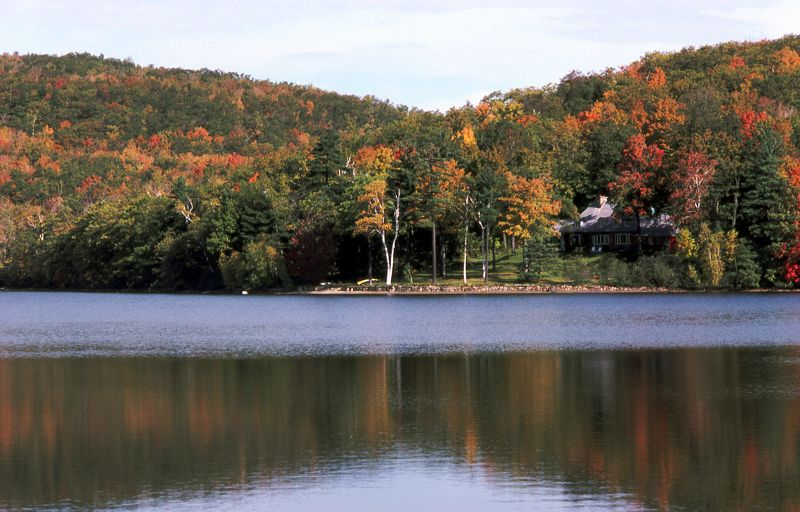
- Seigneurial Lake

- Location within Quebec
- Interactive map of Mont-Saint-Bruno Provincial Park
- Location: Saint-Bruno-de-Montarville, Quebec, Canada
- Nearest city: Montreal
- Coordinates: 45°33′N 73°19′W
- Area: 8.84 km^{2} (3.41 sq mi)
- Established: 1985
- Visitors: 750,000
- Governing body: Société des établissements de plein air du Québec
- Website: www.sepaq.com/pq/msb/index.dot?language_id=1

Mont-Saint-Bruno Provincial Park (French: Parc Provincial du Mont-Saint-Bruno, pronounced [paʁk pʁɔvɛ̃sjal dy mɔ̃ sɛ̃ bʁyno]) is a small national park of Quebec located near the municipality of Saint-Bruno-de-Montarville, 15 kilometres (9.3 mi) to the east of Montréal on the south shore of the Saint Lawrence River. The park, with an area of 8.84 square kilometres (3.41 sq mi), notably includes Mont Saint-Bruno, one of the Monteregian Hills which peaks at 218 metres (715 ft). The mountain is shared with the Ski Mont Saint-Bruno ski resort, a quarry and a small Canadian Forces (5th GSS) training camp. Despite its relatively small size, the mountain is known for its rich fauna and flora. Situated at the heart of the old signory of Montarville, its many lakes have permitted the construction and exploitation of many water mills, contributing to the region's economical success. A building from one of those mills, the "Vieux Moulin" (Old Mill), still stands to this day and is used as a rest area for skiers and hikers in different seasons.

At the beginning of the 20th century, the mountain became a luxury resort and a sought-after area for the food needs of various religious communities. One of those communities, the Brothers of Christian Instruction of St Gabriel, went as far as building a school and an arboretum for the benefit of the neighboring population. In 1976, the Government of Quebec acquired part of the mountain. It established a park in 1985 that, since 1999, is managed by the Société des établissements de plein air du Québec (SÉPAQ).

The park sees approximately 750,000 visitors yearly, where hiking, cross-country skiing and alpine skiing are amongst the most popular activities enjoyed.

== Toponymy ==
The park is named after mount Saint-Bruno, whose namesake is Saint-Bruno-de-Montarville, a municipality directly adjacent to the west flank of the mountain. The mount was known in the past as the "colline de Montarville" (hill of Montarville), from the name of the signory of Montarville. It was the establishment of the Saint-Bruno parish that provoked a gradual shift towards the current name. The parish itself was named as a tribute to the Bruneau family, its early financial contributors.

== Geography ==
The park covers an area of 8.84 square kilometres (3.41 sq mi). It comprises part of mont Saint-Bruno, one of the nine Monteregian Hills and is 218 metres (715 ft) high. It is located about 18 kilometres (11 mi) east of Montreal and is surrounded by the municipalities of Saint-Bruno-de-Montarville, Sainte-Julie and Saint-Basile-le-Grand, all three belonging to the administrative region of Montérégie.

=== Geology ===
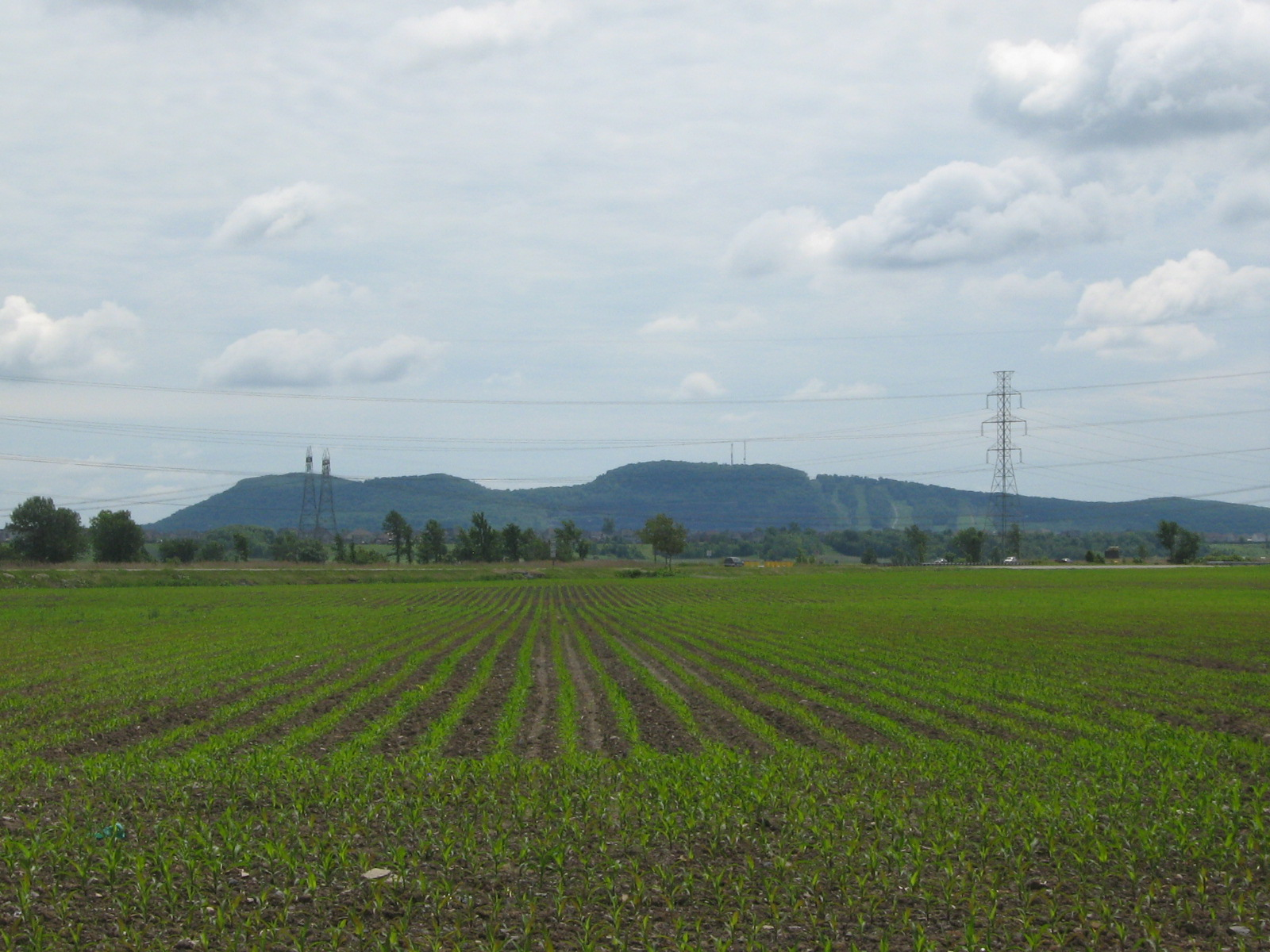
The mount Saint-Bruno as seen from north-west.

The composition and geological origin of mount Saint-Bruno is similar to that of the other Monteregian hills. Formed by an intrusion of magma in the Earth's crust associated with a hotspot created by the opening of the Atlantic Ocean approximately 124 million years ago, the Monteregian hills have been exposed to the elements by the progressive erosion of their paleozoic sedimentary layers, which are softer than their core of metamorphic and igneous rocks that typically form plutons. Contrary to popular belief, they are not volcanoes.

The mountain owes its present rounded aspect to the last glaciation period and the grinding action of glacier movement. It was partially submerged by the Champlain Sea, which has left shallow deposits of clay, sand, sandy gravel and gravel.

The massif's composition is mainly of peridotite accompanied by gabbro and syenite surrounded by shale and siltstone dating from the Ordovician (approximately 500 million years ago) and metamorphosed by the intrusion of magma.

=== Terrain ===
Map of Mont-Saint-Bruno national park (from OpenStreetMap)

Mount Saint-Bruno is an inselberg that reaches 218 metres (715 ft) in altitude, above a plain with an average altitude of 30 metres (98 ft). Its highest summits are situated on its north-eastern flank and form an ellipse around the "lac des Bouleaux" (Birch Lake). Its outer terrain gradually recedes towards the south-east and is punctuated by water-filled dips.

=== Hydrography ===
Despite its small size, the hydrographic network of the park is well developed. It comprises five lakes, one bog, two artificial ponds and many streams, all of them part of the Richelieu River watershed. The du Moulin, Seigneurial and des Bouleaux lakes are used for the municipal water supply of Saint-Bruno-de-Montarville.

=== Climate ===
The climate of the Saint-Lawrence lowlands is moderate, subhumid and continental. It is a region in Quebec where the climate is the most clement. The average annual temperature in the park is 6 °C (43 °F); the season where it stays above 0 °C (32 °F) lasts 149 days on average and the annual insolation is 2000 hours. The mountain gets 1,014 millimetres (39.9 in) of precipitation, of which 239 centimetres (94 in) is snowfall.

Although the mountain stands at only 218 metres (715 ft), the conditions on the summit are a bit harsher than at the bottom, which in consequence causes altitudinal zonation. As the altitude increases, the vegetation passes from sugar maple, bitternut hickory at the base, to northern red oak, sugar maple on the summit.

Climate data for Montréal (McGill)
Month	Jan	Feb	Mar	Apr	May	Jun	Jul	Aug	Sep	Oct	Nov	Dec	Year
Record high °C (°F)	12.8 (55.0)	15.0 (59.0)	25.0 (77.0)	30.0 (86.0)	32.8 (91.0)	34.8 (94.6)	36.1 (97.0)	35.6 (96.1)	32.8 (91.0)	28.9 (84.0)	22.2 (72.0)	15.0 (59.0)	36.1 (97.0)
Mean daily maximum °C (°F)	−5.4 (22.3)	−3.7 (25.3)	2.4 (36.3)	11.0 (51.8)	19.0 (66.2)	23.7 (74.7)	26.6 (79.9)	24.8 (76.6)	19.4 (66.9)	12.3 (54.1)	5.1 (41.2)	−2.3 (27.9)	11.1 (51.9)
Mean daily minimum °C (°F)	−12.4 (9.7)	−10.6 (12.9)	−4.8 (23.4)	2.9 (37.2)	10.0 (50.0)	14.9 (58.8)	17.9 (64.2)	16.7 (62.1)	11.9 (53.4)	5.9 (42.6)	−0.2 (31.6)	−8.9 (16.0)	3.6 (38.5)
Record low °C (°F)	−33.5 (−28.3)	−33.3 (−27.9)	−28.9 (−20.0)	−17.8 (0.0)	−5.0 (23.0)	1.1 (34.0)	7.8 (46.0)	6.1 (43.0)	0.0 (32.0)	−7.2 (19.0)	−27.8 (−18.0)	−33.9 (−29.0)	−33.9 (−29.0)
Average precipitation mm (inches)	73.6 (2.90)	70.9 (2.79)	80.2 (3.16)	76.9 (3.03)	86.5 (3.41)	87.5 (3.44)	106.2 (4.18)	100.6 (3.96)	100.8 (3.97)	84.3 (3.32)	93.6 (3.69)	101.5 (4.00)	1,062.6 (41.85)
Average snowfall cm (inches)	45.9 (18.1)	46.6 (18.3)	36.8 (14.5)	11.8 (4.6)	0.4 (0.2)	0 (0)	0 (0)	0 (0)	0 (0)	2.2 (0.9)	24.9 (9.8)	57.8 (22.8)	226.4 (89.2)
Average precipitation days (≥ 0.2)	15.8	12.8	13.6	12.5	12.9	13.8	12.3	13.4	12.7	13.1	15.0	16.2	164.1
Source: Environment Canada

== Biology and ecology ==
According to the ecological framework of Canada, the park is located in the ecoregion of the Saint-Lawrence lowlands. This region is the one that presents the most meridional climate of the Province. It is characterized by the presence of mixed forests dominated by the sugar maple, the yellow birch, the Canadian hemlock and the eastern white pine. Approximately 60% of the region is dedicated to intensive agriculture. Urbanization is also very important as it comprises Montréal, Québec City and Ottawa within its area.

=== Flora ===
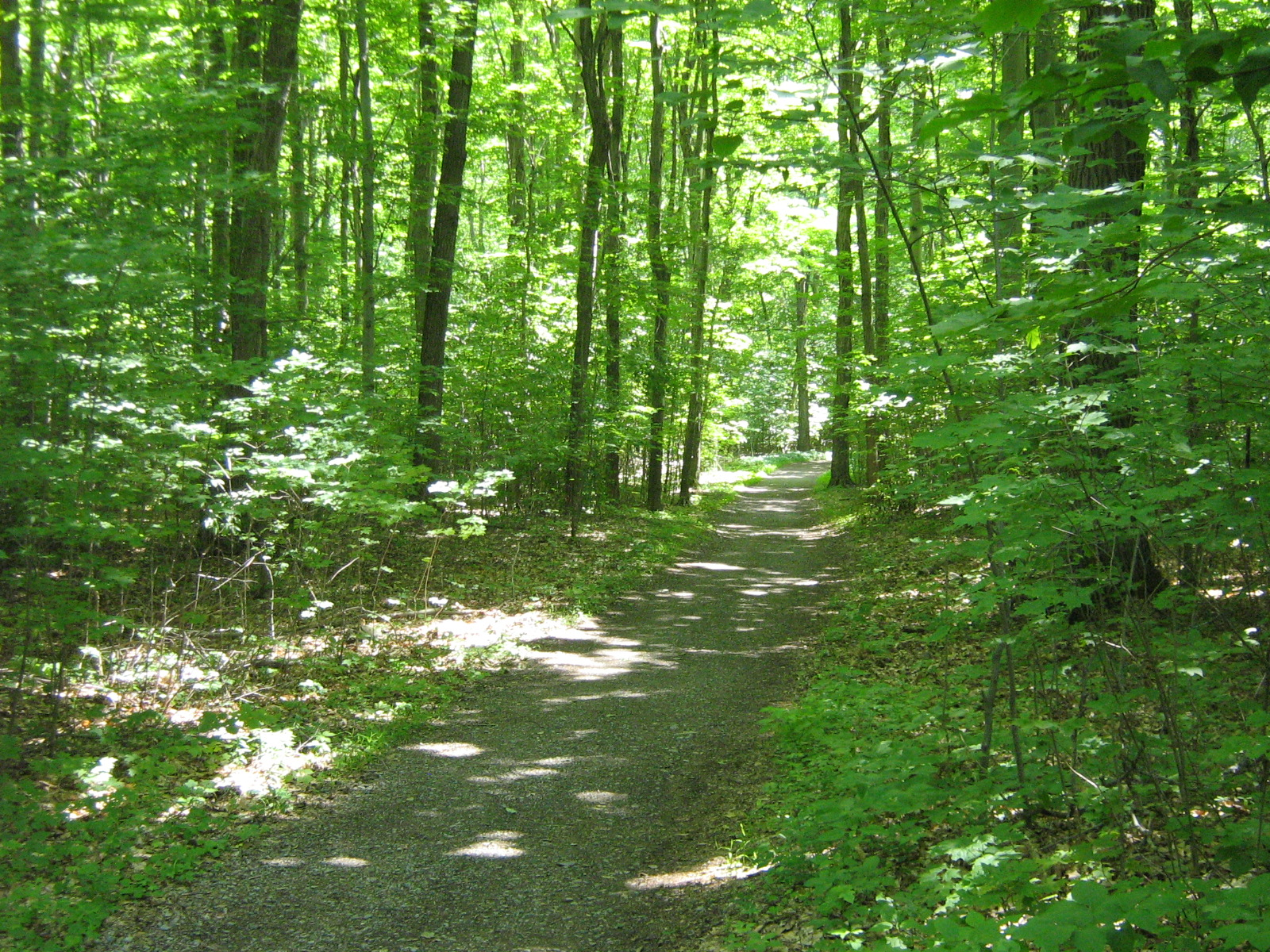
A forest trail in the park.

The Mont-Saint-Bruno park is home to 574 plant species, 20% of the documented total in the province. Below 140 metres (460 ft) of altitude, the park's forest is dominated by maple and bitternut hickory (Carya cordiformis). Between 100 metres (330 ft) and 140 metres (460 ft), the forest is dominated by the sugar maple (Acer saccharum) together with the American tilia (Tilia americana) or the red oak (Quercus rubra). Also found in the park are the Canadian hemlock (Tsuga canadensis), the American hophornbeam (Ostrya virginiana), the yellow birch (Betula alleghaniensis), the moosewood (Viburnum lantanoides) and the northern whitecedar (Thuja occidentalis).

24 plan species found in the park are threatened species. Those plants are:

- Northern maidenhair fern (Adiantum pedatum)
- Wild garlic (Allium tricoccum)
- Canada wild ginger (Asarum canadense)
- Broadleaf toothwort (Cardamine diphylla)
- American ginseng (Panax quinquefolius)
- Ostrich fern (Matteuccia struthiopteris)
- Broad beech fern (Phegopteris hexagonoptera)
- Mayapple (Podophyllum peltatum)
- Bloodroot (Sanguinaria canadensis)
- White trillium (Trillium grandiflorum)
- Large-flowered bellwort (Uvularia grandiflora)
- Cutleaf toothwort (Cardamine concatenata)
- Back's sedge (Carex backii)
- Oval-leaf sedge (Carex cephalophora)
- Pubescent sedge (Carex hirtifolia)
- Hitchcock's sedge (Carex hitchcockiana)
- Broadleaf sedge (Carex platyphylla)
- Swan's sedge (Carex swanii)
- Bur-reed sedge (Carex sparganioides
- American cancer-root (Conopholis americana)
- Nakedflower ticktrefoil (Desmodium nudiflorum)
- Gay orchid (Galearis spectabilis)
- American bladdernut) (Staphylea trifolia)

=== Fauna ===
==== Mammals ====
The park is frequented by 38 species of mammals. The sole great mammal found in the park is the white-tailed deer (Odocoileus virginianus). The most common mammals are the eastern grey squirrel (Peromyscus leucopus), the white-footed mouse (Peromyscus leucopus), the eastern chipmunk (Tamias striatus) and the groundhog (Marmota monax). Three threatened species find home within the confines of the park, all of them bats: the silver-haired bat (Lasionycteris noctivagans), the hoary bat (Lasiurus cinereus) and the eastern red bat (Lasiurus borealis).

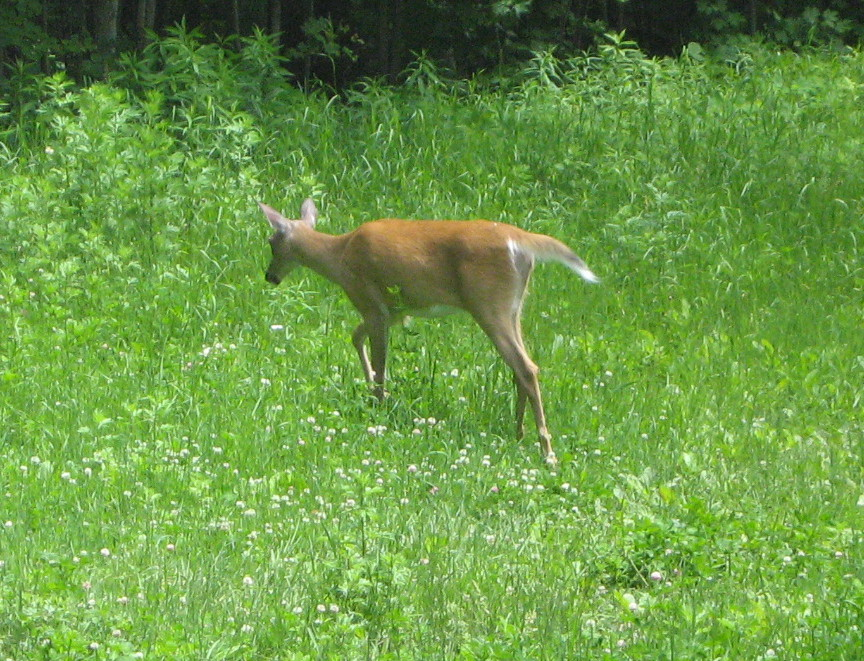
White-tailed deer

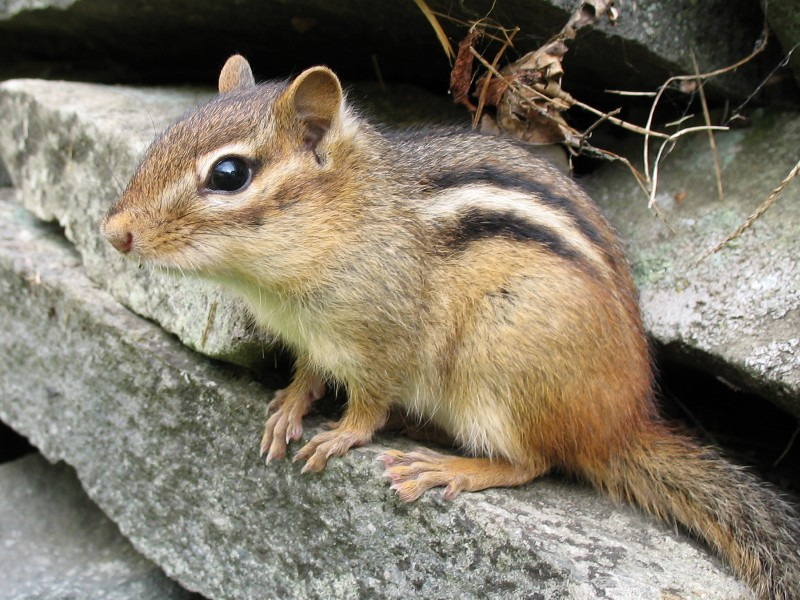
Eastern chipmunk

==== Birds ====
234 species of bird can be observed in Mont-Saint-Bruno National Park, which is 72% of all bird species represented in the province of Québec. Amongst them are many birds of prey such as the red-shouldered hawk (Buteo lineatus), the Cooper's hawk (Accipiter cooperii), the eastern screech owl (Megascops asio), the great horned owl (Bubo virginianus), the barred owl (Strix varia), the northern goshawk (Accipiter gentilis), the broad-winged hawk (Buteo platypterus), the red-tailed hawk (Buteo jamaicensis) and the American kestrel (Falco sparverius). Five threatened species of birds can be found in the park, the peregrine falcon (Falco peregrinus), the sedge wren (Cistothorus platensis), the Cerulean warbler (Setophaga cerulea), the chimney swift (Chaetura pelagica) and the common nighthawk (Chordeiles minor).

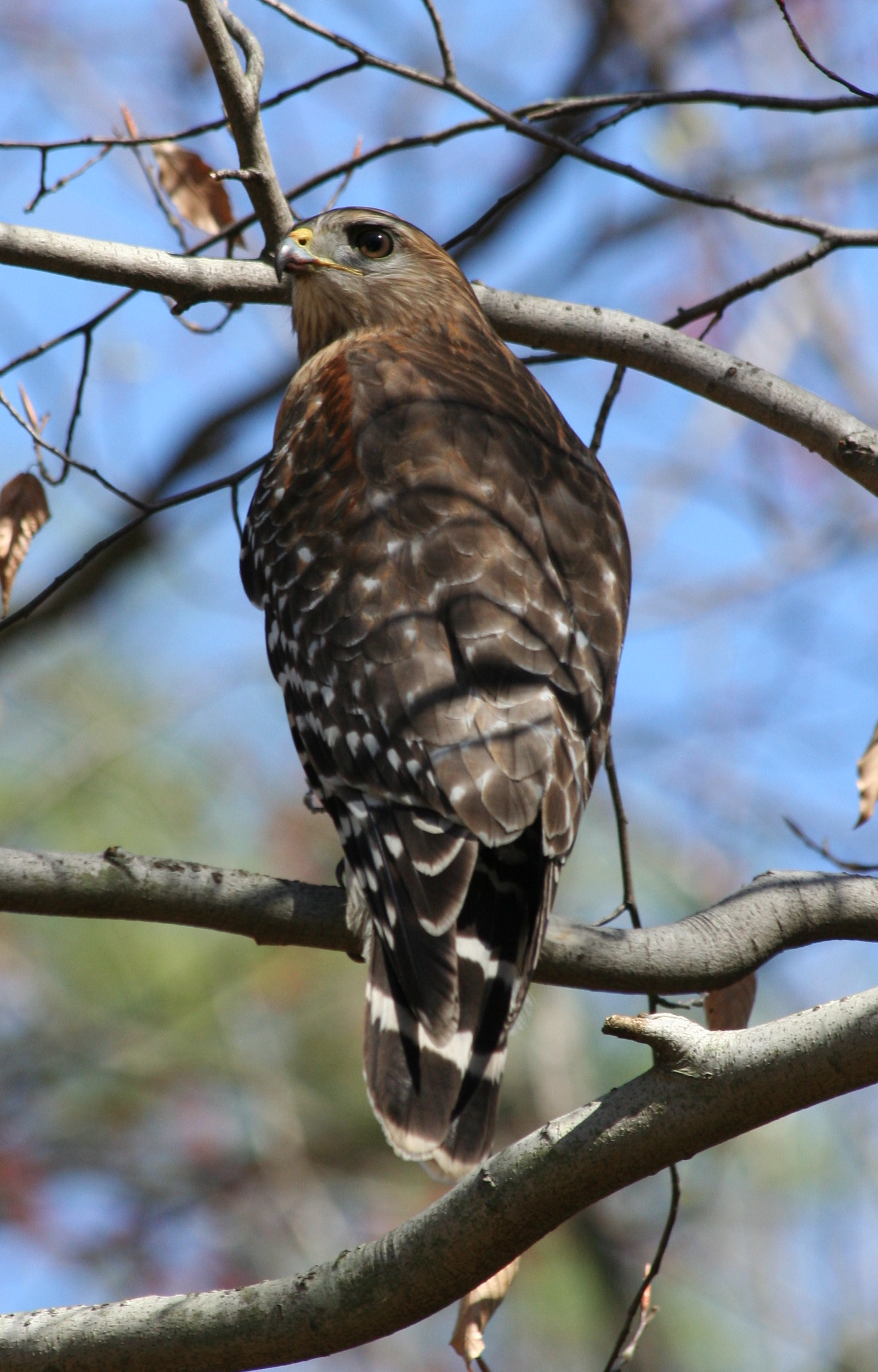
Red-shouldered hawk

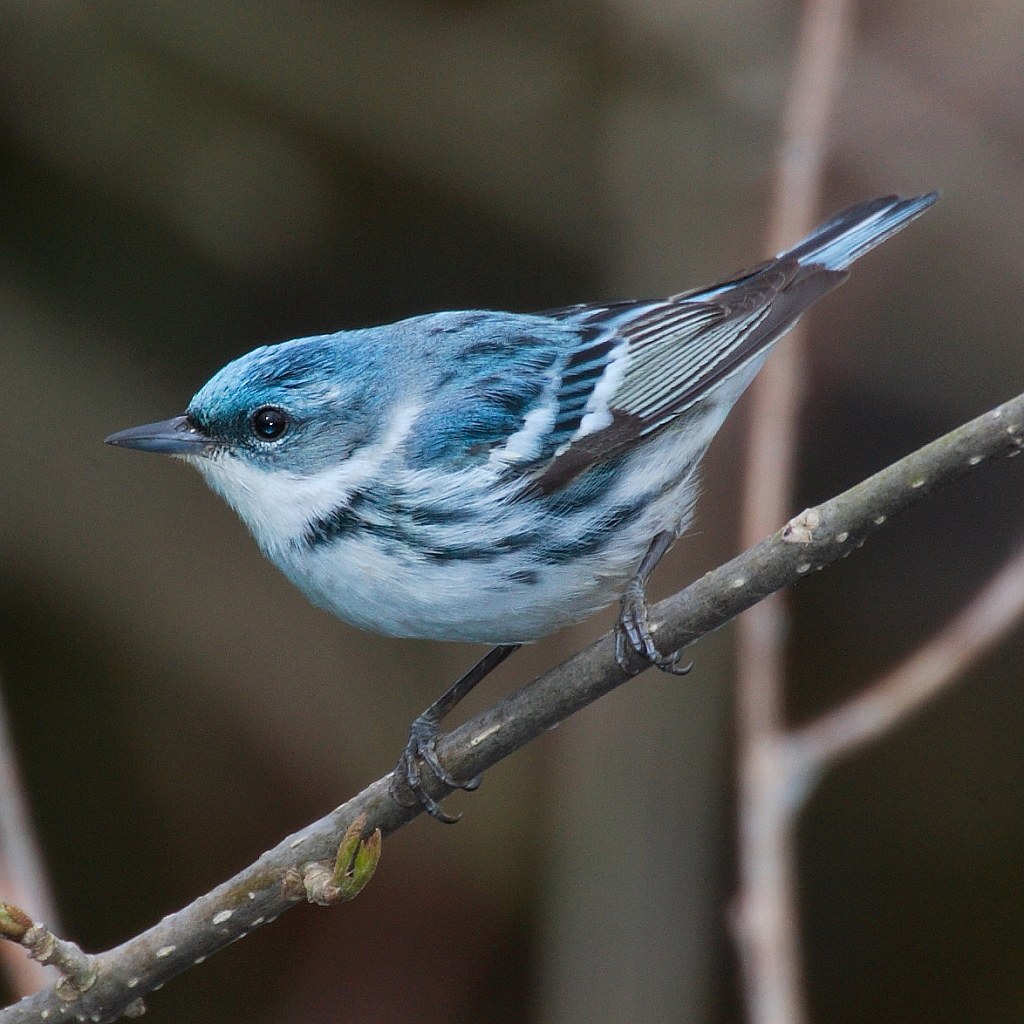
Cerulean warbler

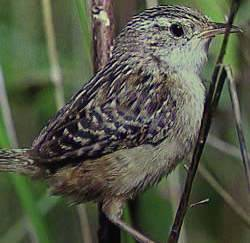
Sedge wren

==== Reptiles and amphibians ====
Seven species of reptiles are present in the park (43% of the province's total), the common snapping turtle (Chelydra serpentina), the painted turtle (Chrysemys picta), the northern map turtle (Graptemys geographica), the common garter snake (Thamnophis sirtalis), the redbelly snake (Storeria occipitomaculata) and the ringneck snake (Diadophis punctatus). Its amphibian population is composed of 14 (62% of the province's total) species, the eastern newt (Notophthalmus viridescens), the spotted salamander (Ambystoma maculatum), the blue-spotted salamander (Ambystoma laterale), the four-toed salamander (Hemidactylium scutatum), the red-backed salamander (Plethodon cinereus), the American toad (Anaxyrus americanus), the gray tree frog (Hyla versicolor), the spring peeper (Pseudacris crucifer), the wood frog (Lithobates sylvatica), the leopard frog (Lithobates pipiens), the pickerel frog (Lithobates palustris), the green frog (Lithobates clamitans), the mink frog (Lithobates septentrionalis) and the bullfrog (Lithobates catesbeiana). Four of those species are threatened, the four-toed salamander, the pickerel frog, the northern map turtle and the ringneck snake.

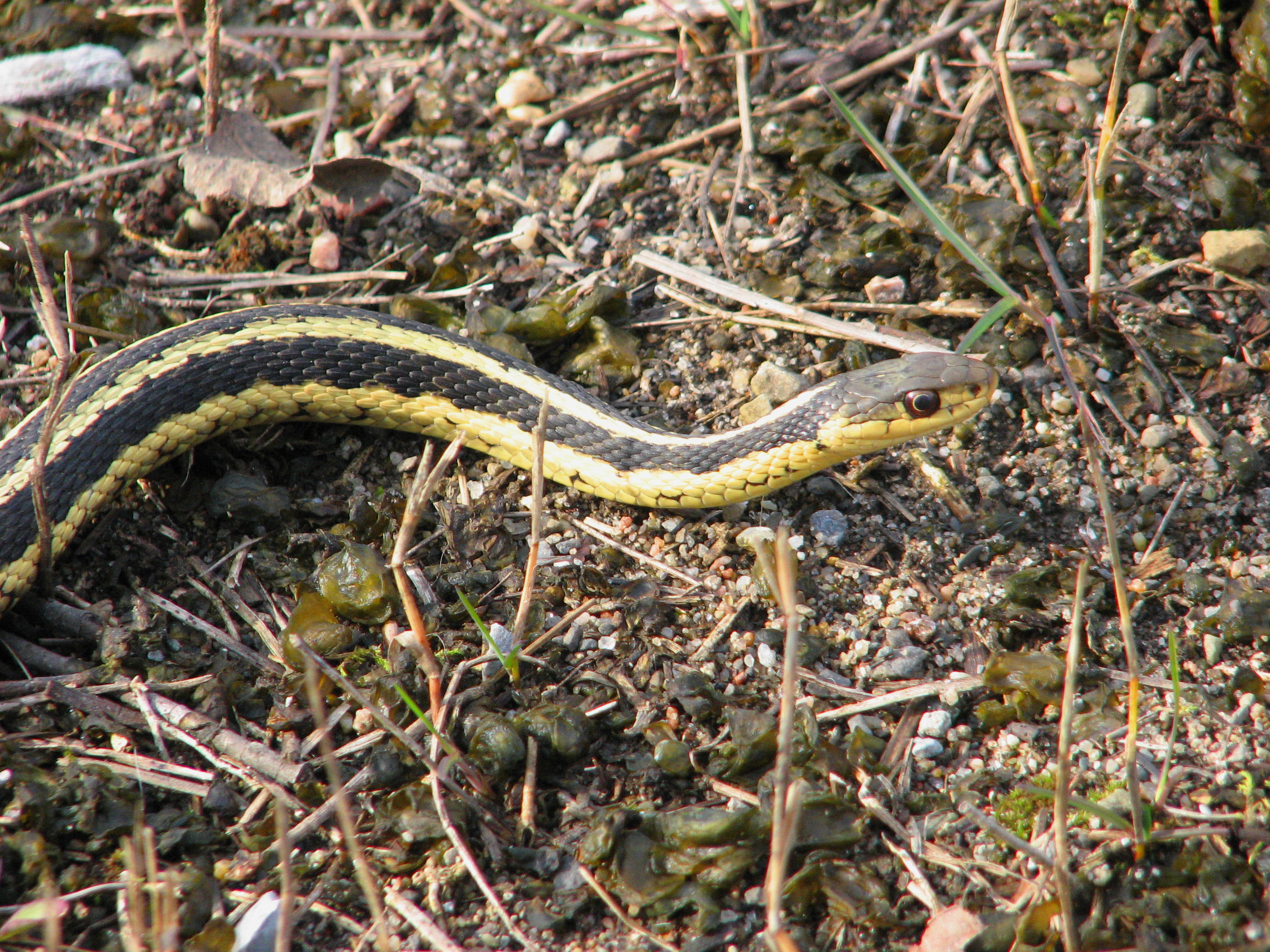
Common garter snake

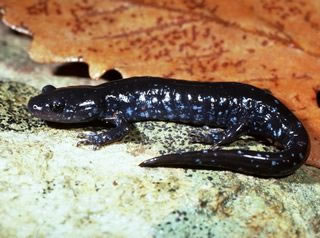
Blue-spotted salamander

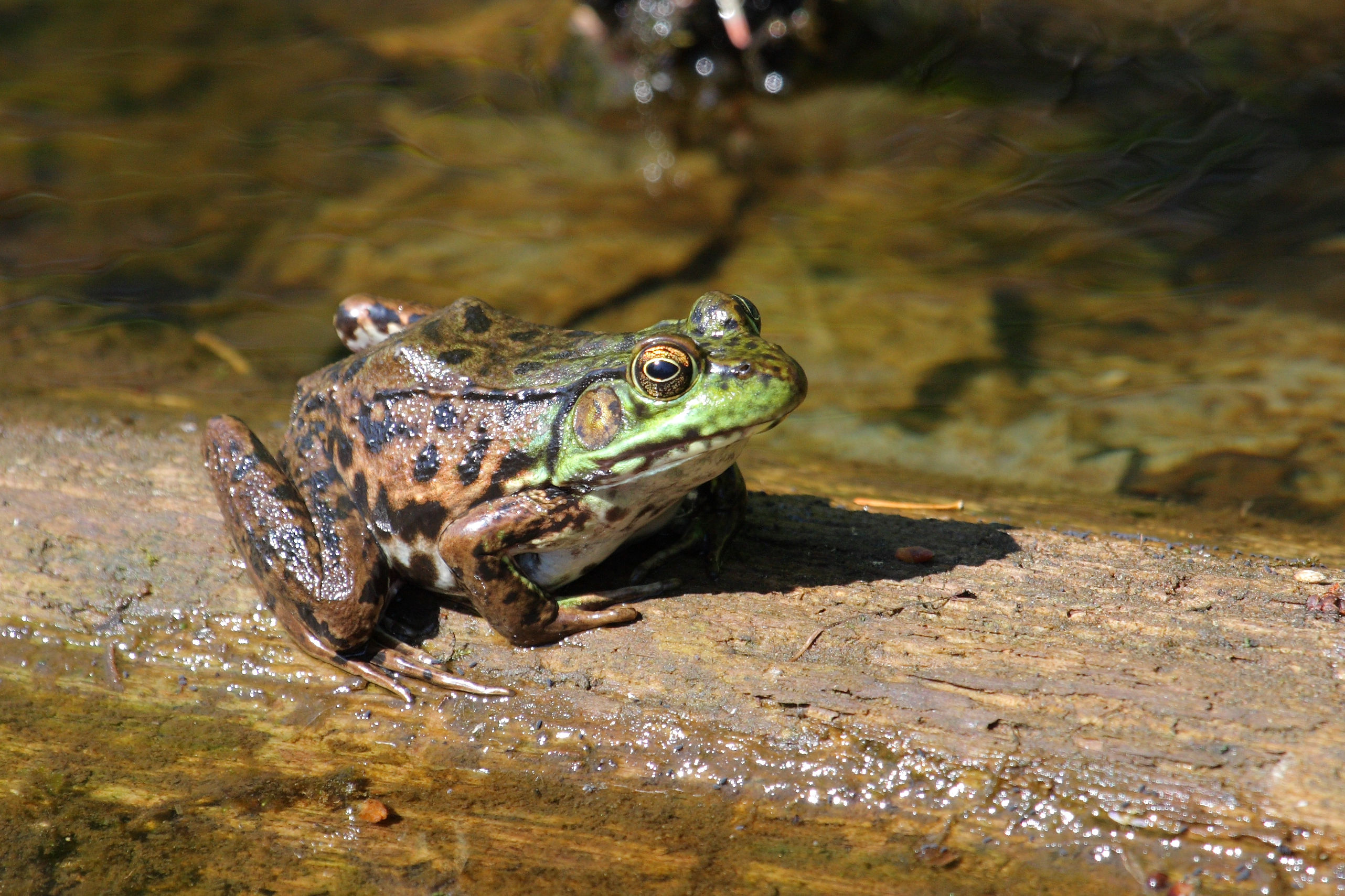
Green frog

==== Fishes ====
13 species of fish have been counted in the park's lakes, the pumpkinseed (Lepomis gibbosus), the smallmouth bass (Micropterus dolomieu), the yellow perch (Perca flavescens), the white sucker (Catostomus commersonii), the brown bullhead (Ameiurus nebulosus), the golden shiner (Notemigonus crysoleucas), the common carp (Cyprinus carpio), the black crappie (Pomoxis nigromaculatus), the goldfish (Carassius auratus), the bluntnose minnow (Pimephales notatus), the tessellated darter (Etheostoma olmstedi), the rock bass (Ambloplites rupestris) and the blacknose shiner (Notropis heterolepis).

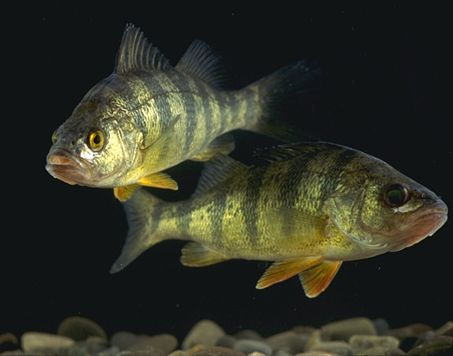
Yellow perch

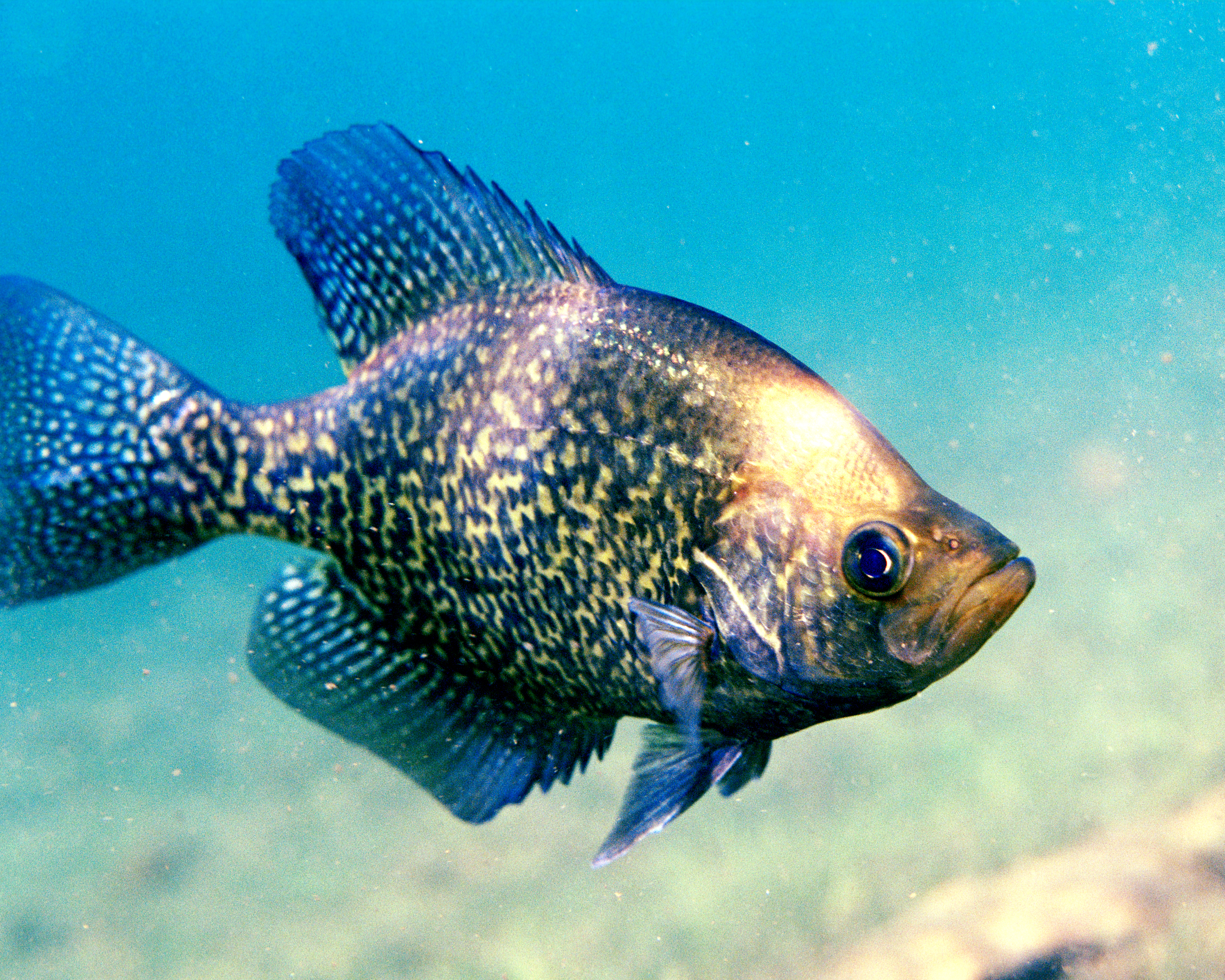
Black crappie

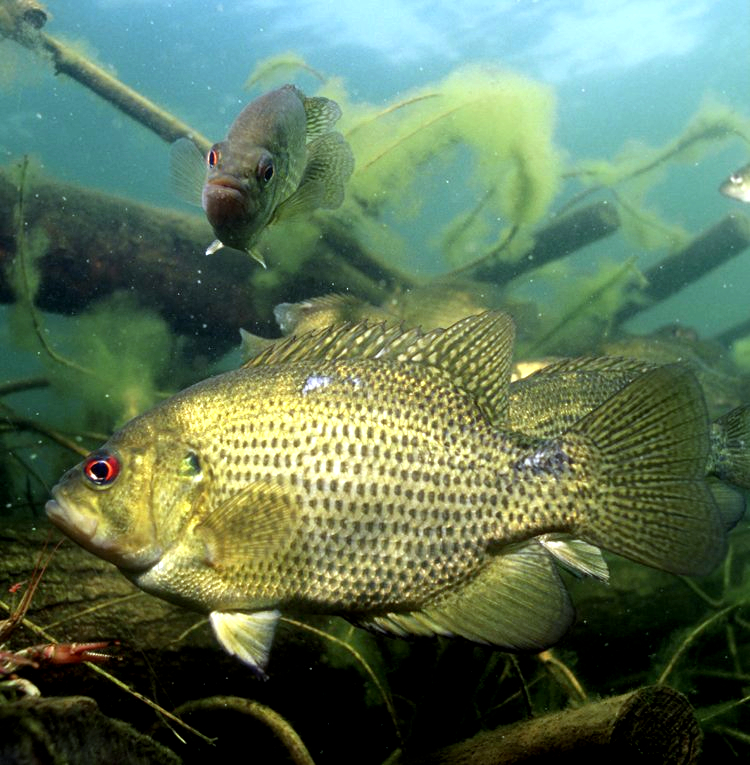
Rock bass

== History ==
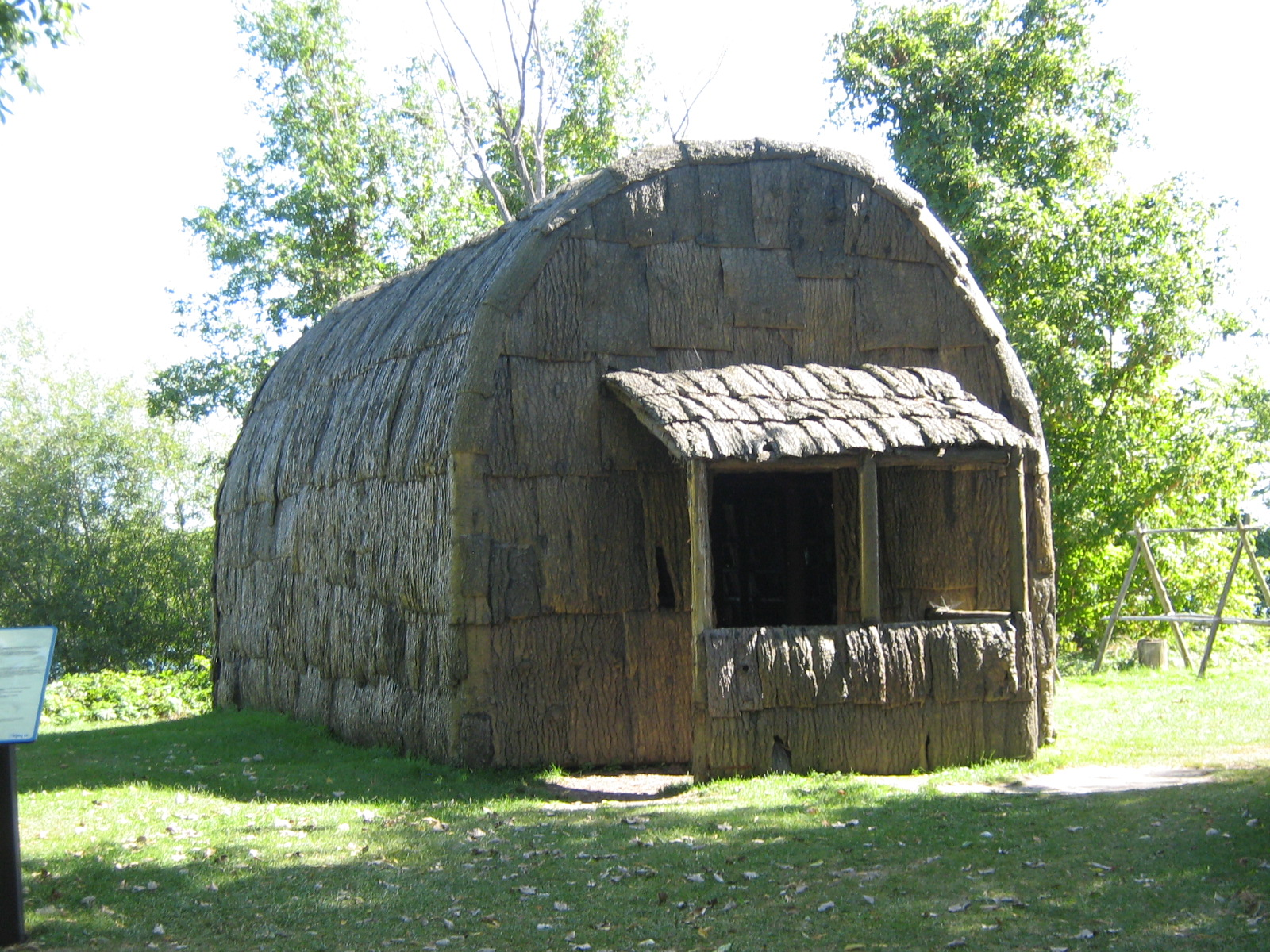
Reconstitution of a Longhouse of the indigenous peoples of North America at the Îles-de-Boucherville National Park.

No trace of indigenous occupation has been found in the park. However, it is likely that the territory was occupied during the archaic period beginning at least 8,000 years ago and continuing through the Sylvicole (1000 B.C. to 1500 A.D.) until the arrival of the French in the 16th century. The native indigenous culture associated with Mont-Saint-Bruno is that of the St. Lawrence Iroquoians, who disappeared around 1580.

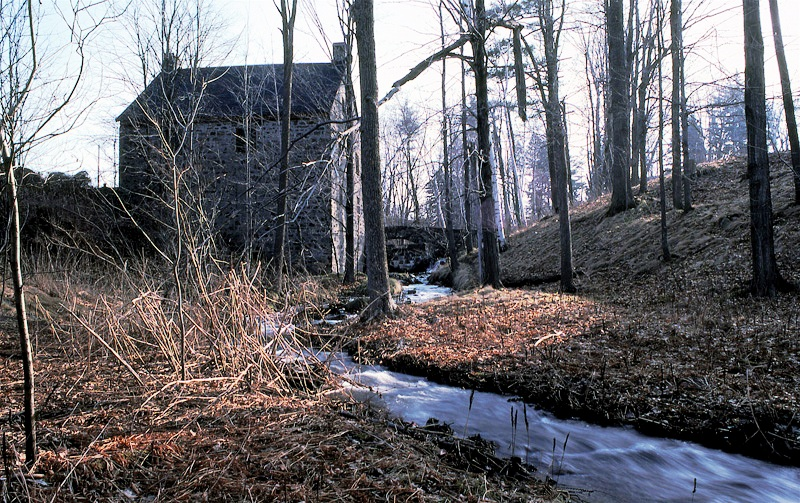
The old water mill (Vieux-Moulin) of Saint-Bruno.

In 1710, the seigneury of Montarville was conceded to Pierre Boucher, son of the neighboring seigneur of Boucherville. However, it was 30 years before the seigneury began to develop, due to a lack of navigable waterways in close enough proximity. Contrary to other seigneuries of the Montreal region, the seigneury of Saint-Bruno used water rather than wind to power its mills, which at one point numbered five and were all built between 1725 and 1816. Their hydraulic power was harnessed for grinding wheat, tanning leather, carding and spinning wool and sawing wood. The sole mill that is still standing to this day is the grain mill, rebuilt in 1761 on the site of the first mill. In 1825, the Boucher family sold the seigneury to François-Pierre Bruneau, a lawyer from Montreal who in turn passed it to his cousin, Olivier-Théophile (who was the first professor of anatomy at McGill University in 1851. On his death, in 1855, the seigneury ceased to exist.

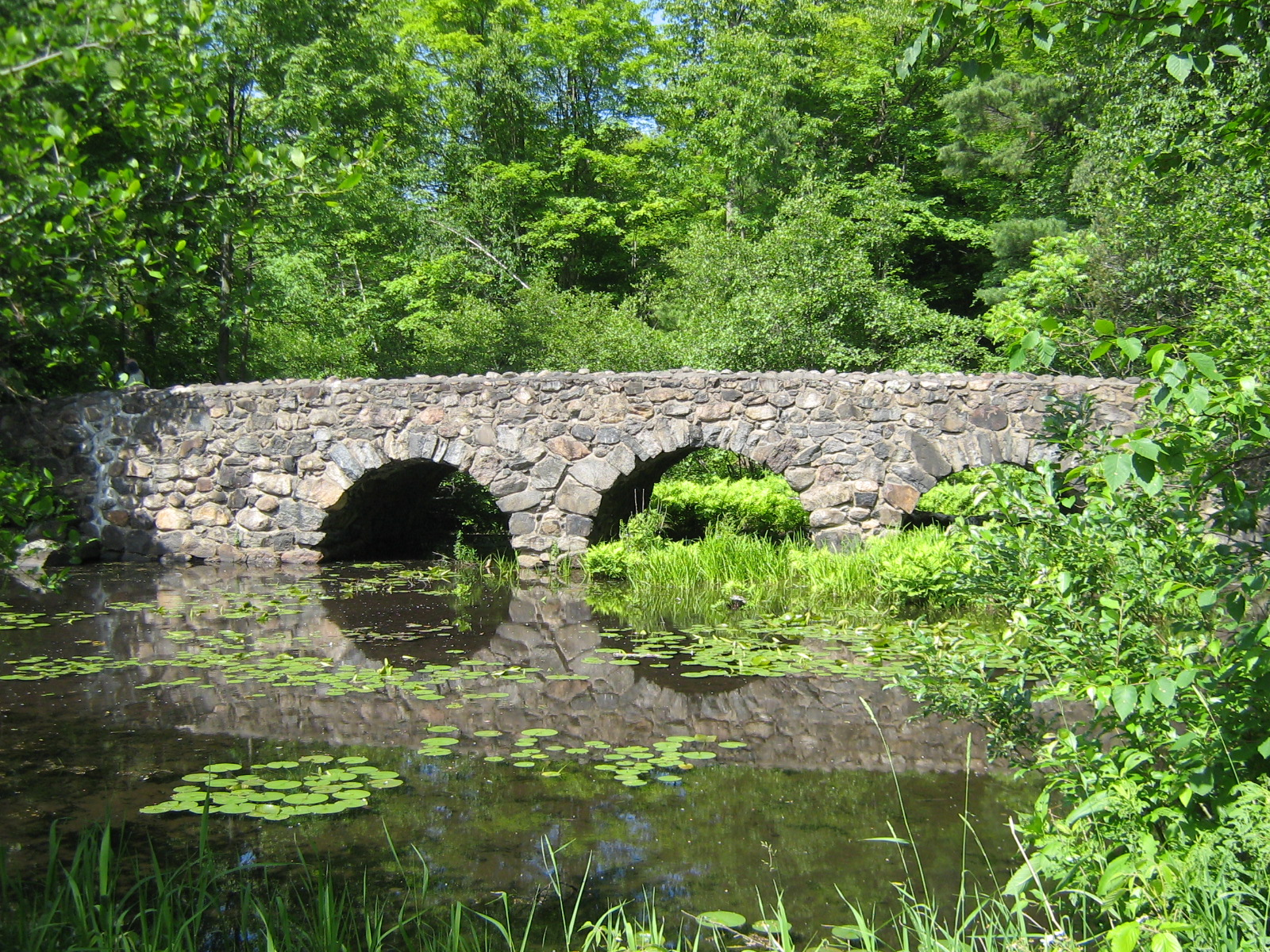
Arch bridge built by Pease.

In 1897, Edson Loy Pease, a rich banker from Montreal, acquired 405 hectares (1,000 acres) of the mountain. In 1899, this terrain was sold to the Mount Bruno Association, an organization created to manage the domain in shared ownership, presided by Pease until his death in 1930. The association built 10 resorts between 1899 and 1940 that are now within the park. The Pease domain, located on the lac du Moulin, was destroyed by flames in 1941.

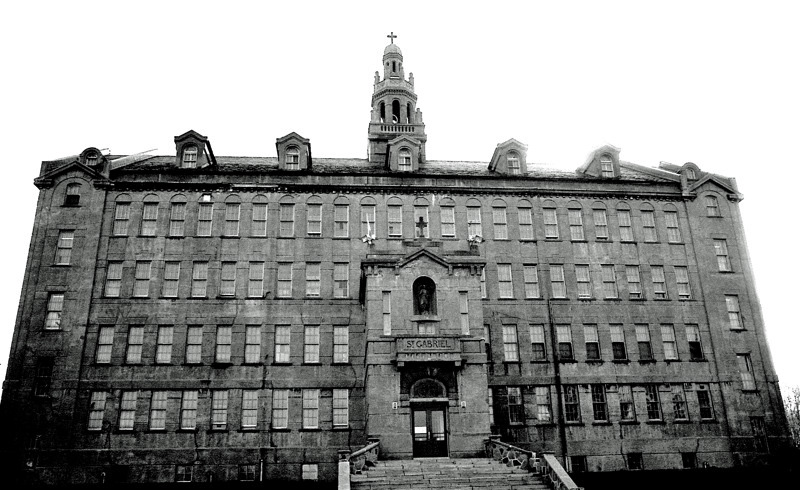
Brothers of Christian Instruction of St Gabriel seminary.

At the beginning of the 20th century, four religious communities, the Society of Jesus, the Trinitarian Order, the Congregation of the Sacred Hearts of Jesus and Mary and the Brothers of Christian Instruction of St Gabriel all purchased land parcels around the mountain to flee from Montreal's sprawling urbanization and to meet the food requirements of their schools. The Brothers of Saint-Gabriel would leave the greatest imprint on the mountain. They moved in 1912 close to the Villa Grand-Coteau, which was at that time the property of the Society of Jesus. In 1922, the latter sold the Brothers all their land in the area, including the villa. The acquisition became profitable very quickly, in part because of its apple orchards, and also because of its dairy production. In 1925, they constructed a seminary that became the most important school of this congregation in Québec. In 1930, they built a cemetery and in 1954, a grotto. The brothers finally sold all their land around Mount-Saint-Bruno to the government of Québec in 1976, and in 1990, the seminary was demolished. The apple orchard as well as an 0.51 hectares (1.3 acres) arboretum, which at one point was home to 176 species of trees and bushes, are the sole remainders of this religious community's presence on the flanks of the mountain.

A quarry was exploited from 1928 to the middle of the 1940s and left a gash in the mountain with a width of 115 metres (377 ft), a length of 140 metres (460 ft) and a depth of 40 metres (130 ft) on its steepest flank. In 1965, the Ski Mont Saint-Bruno ski resort was opened. With time, the proximity of this resort to the urban region of Montreal has made Mont-Saint-Bruno a well known ski school.

=== Creation of the Park ===
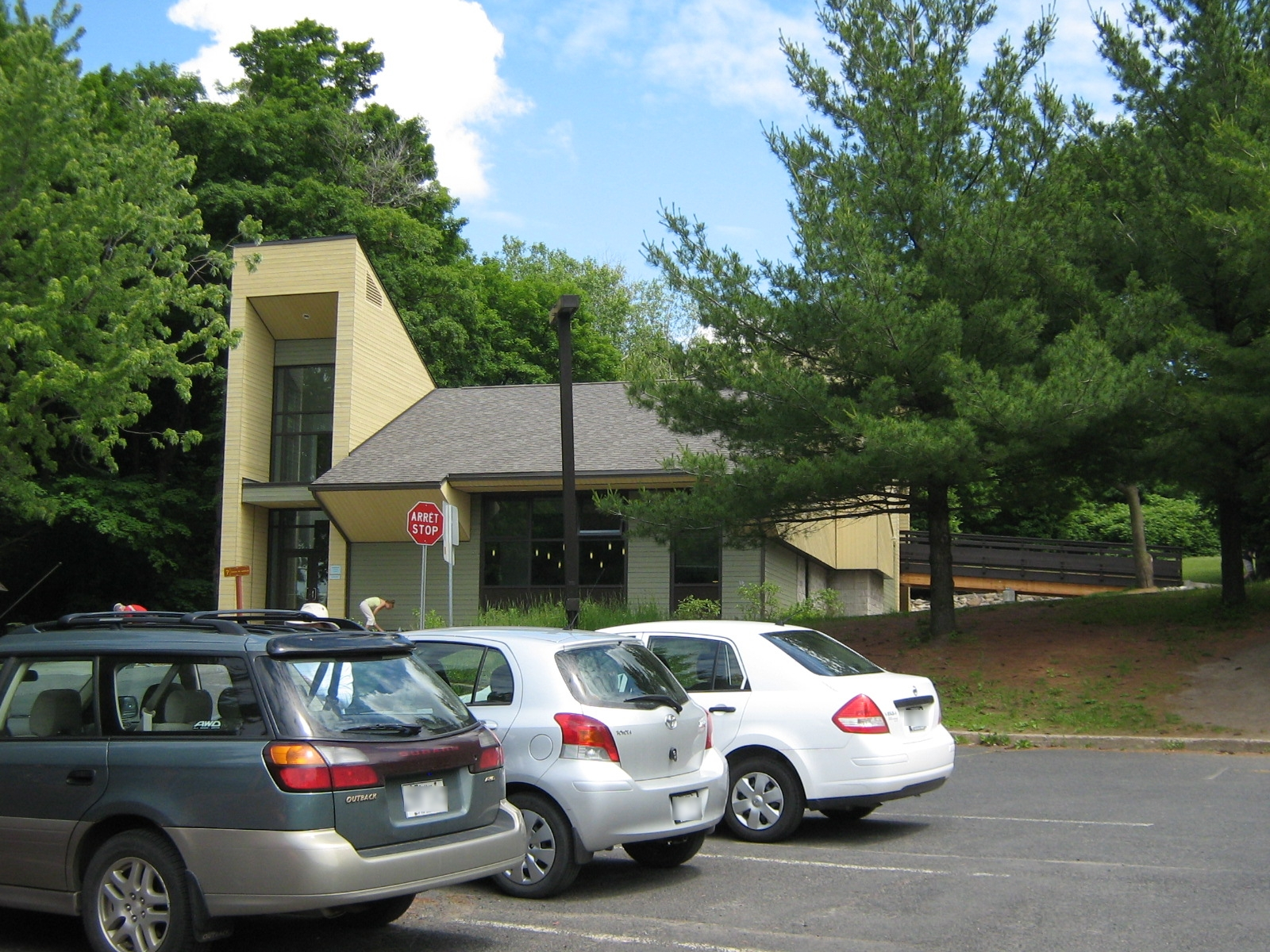
The visitors center.

In 1969, the city of Saint-Bruno-de-Montarville acquired 1.5 square kilometres (0.58 sq mi) of land in the mountain in order to protect the lakes that form its drinking water supply. Following requests to protect the mountain, the government of Québec purchased all the land in 1975 and 1976 to make the mountain a park and a fishing and hunting reserve. Public hearings were held in 1982 aimed at creating a provincial park. In 2001, the status of the park was modified, along with that of all other of Quebec's provincial park, to "parc national". In 2000, public hearings were conducted again with the aim of increasing the territory covered by the park from 5.78 square kilometres (2.23 sq mi) to 7.79 square kilometres (3.01 sq mi) by annexing land belonging to the city and the Department of National Defence, the latter comprising the summit of the mountain. Finally, on the 27th of July 2012, the government of Québec announced that the area of the park was to be increased to its limits established back in 2000. Limits over which the park had full administration rights, but were not officially part of its territory. This increase in land coverage included a mire and the main hills that the park was previously missing. A few more lots were again annexed to the park in 2013, giving it its current area.

== Administration ==
As is the case for Quebec's other national parks (with the exception of Pingualuit and Kuururjuaq national parks, which are administered by Nunavik parks), the Mont-Saint-Bruno national park has been administered by the Société des établissements de plein air du Québec (SÉPAQ) since 1999. The SÉPAQ oversees the provision of activities and services as well as park protection and promotion. The exploitation of natural resources for forestry, mining or energy production is forbidden, as it is in any other of Quebec's parks, and so are hunting, trapping and poaching. The passage of gas or oil pipelines is also forbidden in all parks except for existing installations.

The park shares its administration center with the Îles-de-Boucherville National Park, about 10 kilometres (6.2 mi) to the west, where its offices are located.

== Tourism ==
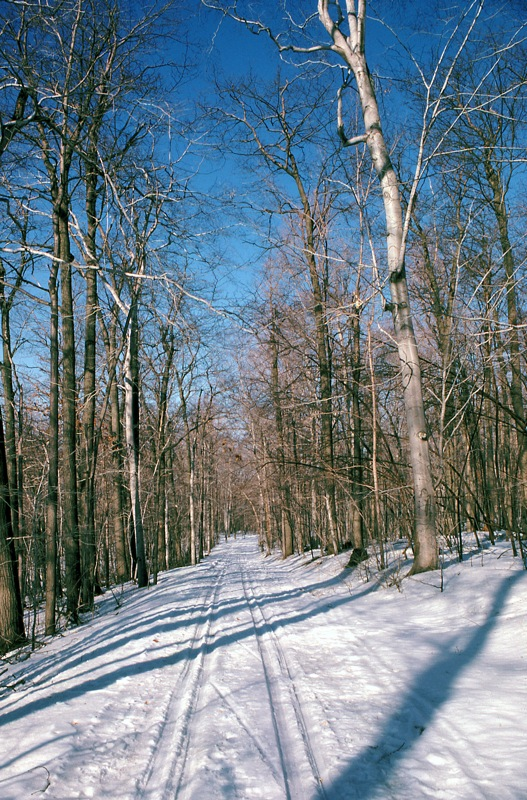
Cross-country skiing trail.

The park is frequented by around 750,000 visitors yearly, which makes it the third most visited park of the province after the Gatineau Park and the Saguenay–St. Lawrence Marine Park. It is accessible year round but does not possess lodging infrastructure.

In summertime, it is possible to hike along a 30 kilometres (19 mi) network of trails, and to bike on the park's service roads. Between the months of August and October, the orchard is open for apple picking.

In wintertime, cross-country skiing and hiking are the preferred activities.

The Mont-Saint-Bruno national park, with Mont-Tremblant National Park and Mont-Orford National Park, is one of three national parks in Québec that is also home to an alpine skiing resort. Ski Mont Saint-Bruno is a small station that started operating in 1965. It is known for its large ski school, currently 562 teachers strong with an attendance of around 30,000 students. The resort has 15 ski slopes and is visited by 300,000 skiers per season.

== See also ==
- Mont Saint-Bruno
- Ski Mont Saint-Bruno
- List of protected areas in Quebec
