= Mont Saint-Bruno =

Mountain in Montérégie, Quebec, Canada

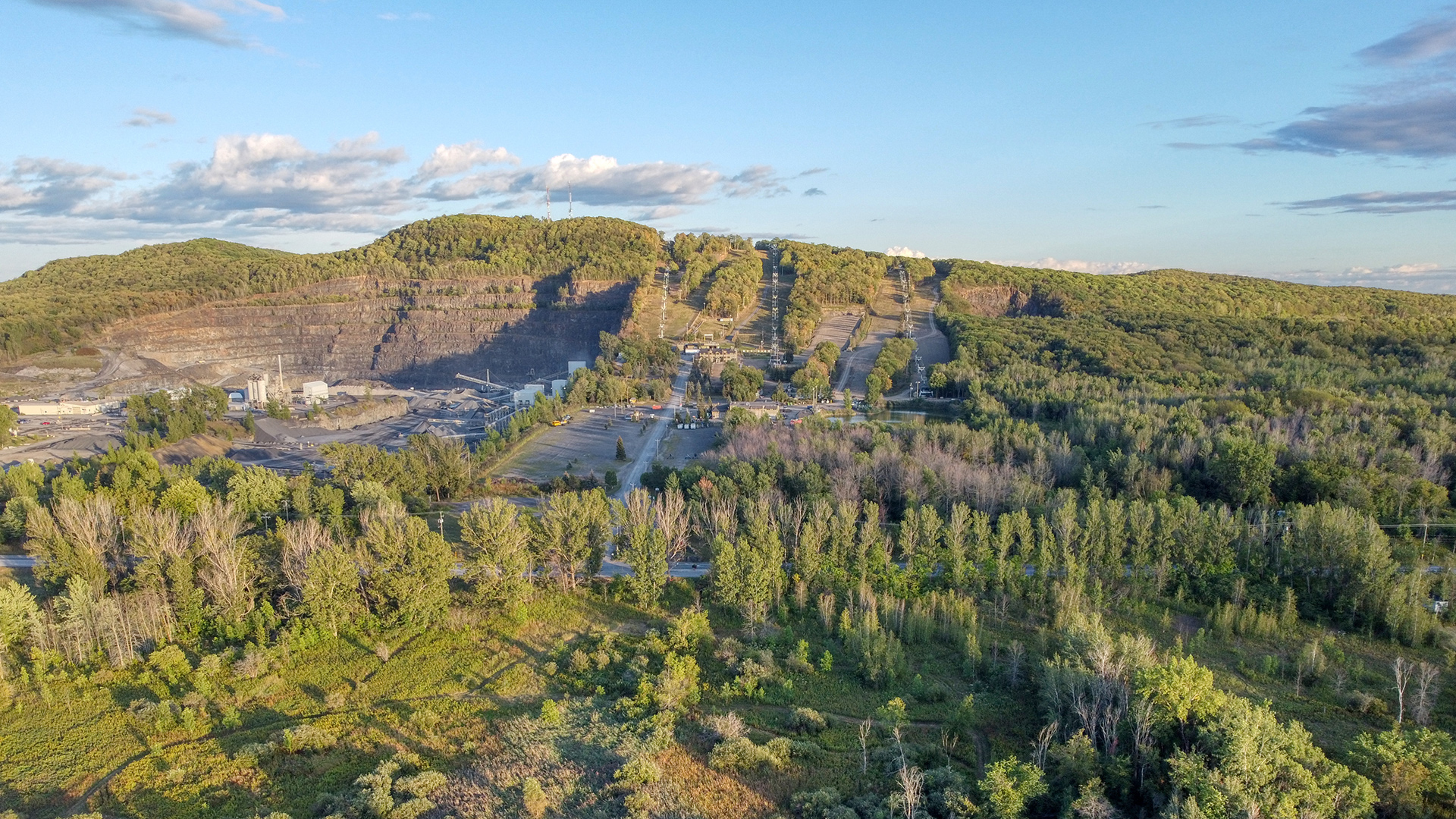

Highest point
- Elevation: 218 m (715 ft)
- Coordinates: 45°33′18″N 73°18′36″W

Geography
- Location within Quebec
- Location: Saint-Bruno-de-Montarville, Montreal, Quebec, Canada
- Parent range: Monteregian Hills
- Topo map: NTS 31H11 Beloeil

Geology
- Rock age: Early Cretaceous
- Mountain type: Intrusive stock

Mont Saint-Bruno (French pronunciation: [mɔ̃ sɛ̃ bʁyno]; also known as Mount Saint Bruno in English) is part of the Monteregian Hills in southern Quebec, Canada. Its summit stands 218 m (715 ft) high and lies 23 km (14 mi) east of downtown Montreal.

This mountain has a ski resort, a natural area, and an apple orchard. Forests of beech, maple, oak, hickory, ironwood, hemlock and pine cover those slopes which have not been cleared for agriculture or skiing. The apple orchard is an agricultural research station operated by IRDA (The Research and Development Institute for the Agri-Environment of Québec).

Mont-Saint-Bruno National Park encompasses part of the mount, which also contains ski slopes Ski Mont Saint-Bruno. A quarry also occupies part of it. Mont Saint-Bruno is also home to a small Canadian Forces training camp where new recruits from the Canadian Forces Leadership and Recruit School learn navigation and topography.

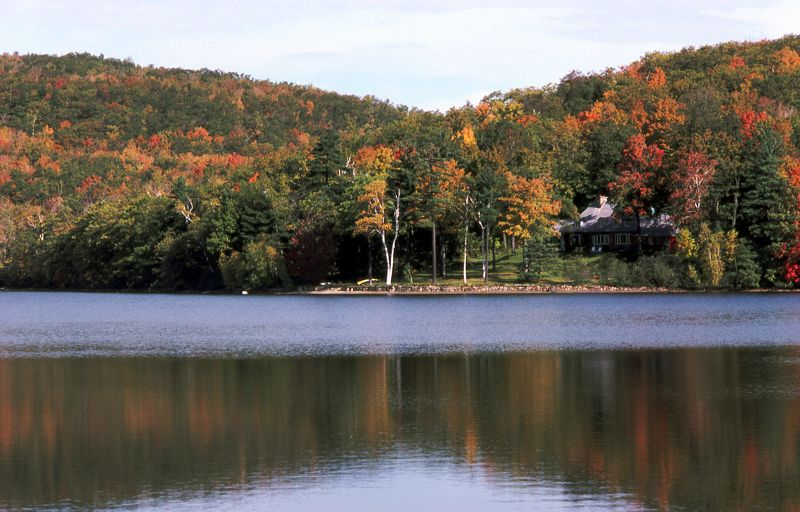
Seigneurial lake

== Geology ==
Mont Saint-Bruno might be the deep extension of a vastly eroded ancient volcanic complex, which was probably active about 125 million years ago. The mountain was created when the North American Plate moved westward over the New England hotspot, along with the other mountains of the Monteregian Hills. As a result, Mont Saint-Bruno forms part of the Great Meteor hotspot track. Its igneous rock consists mostly of pyroxenite and gabbro.
