= Charles-François Painchaud (politician) =

Charles-François Painchaud (September 8, 1815 – August 8, 1891) was a physician and political figure in Canada East. He represented Verchères in the Legislative Assembly of the Province of Canada in 1863.

== Biography ==
He was born François-Xavier Painchaud in Île aux Grues, Lower Canada, the son of Jérôme-David Painchaud and Julie Langlois. Painchaud was educated at the Collège de Sainte-Anne-de-la-Pocatière which had been founded by his uncle who was also named Charles-François Painchaud. He practised medicine in Varennes and served on the village council. In 1845, he married Françoise Duchesnois. He was defeated by Alexandre-Édouard Kierzkowski when he ran for a seat in the assembly in 1861 but was declared elected in 1863 after that election was declared invalid; he did not run for reelection later that same year.

He died in Varennes at the age of 75.
