= Saint-Bruno-de-Montarville =

- City
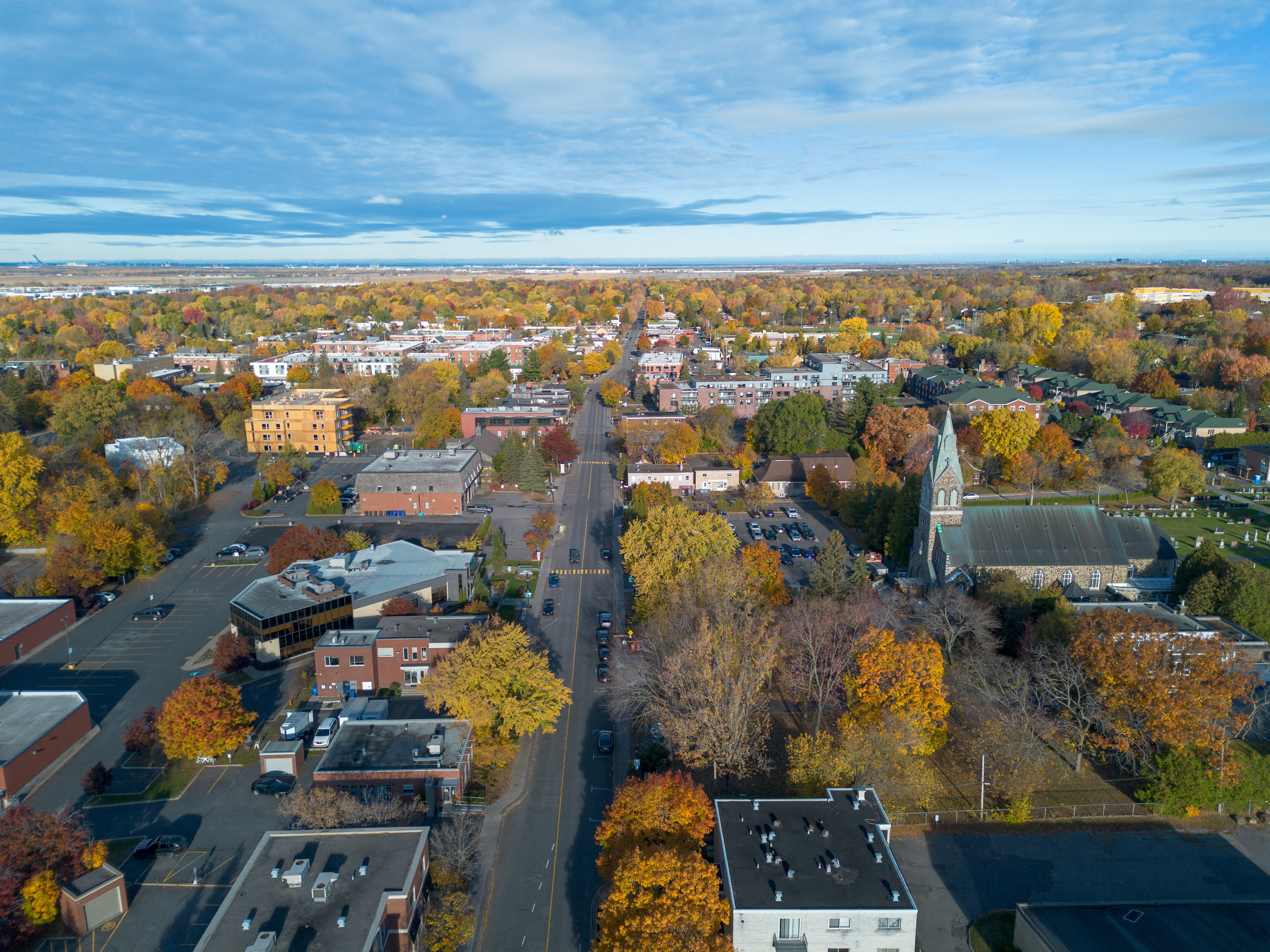
- Saint-Bruno-de-Montarville in 2025

- Coat of arms
- Motto: Fiers de nos traditions (French for "Proud of our traditions")
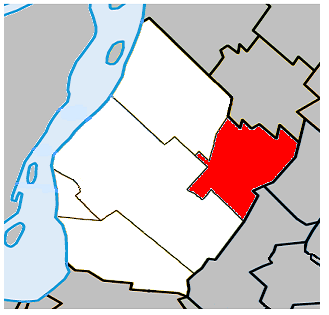
- Location within the urban agglomeration of Longueuil

- Location in southern Quebec
- Coordinates: 45°32′N 73°21′W
- Country: Canada
- Province: Quebec
- Region: Montérégie
- RCM: None
- Agglomeration: Longueuil
- Founded: 1842
- Constituted: 1 January 2006

Government
  - Mayor: Ludovic Grisé Farand
  - MP: Bienvenu-Olivier Ntumba (LPC)
  - MNA: Nathalie Roy (CAQ)

Area
  - Total: 43.30 km^{2} (16.72 sq mi)
  - Land: 42.85 km^{2} (16.54 sq mi)

Population (2021)
  - Total: 26,273
  - Density: 613.2/km^{2} (1,588/sq mi)
  - Pop 2016-2021: ▲0.3%
  - Dwellings: 10,629
- Demonym(s): Montarvillois,(e) (French)
- Time zone: UTC−5 (EST)
  - Summer (DST): UTC−4 (EDT)
- Area codes: 450 and 579
- Highways A-30: R-116
- Website: www.stbruno.ca

Saint-Bruno-de-Montarville (French pronunciation: [sɛ̃ bʁyno d(ə) mɔ̃taʁvil]) is an off-island suburb of Montreal, in southwestern Quebec, Canada, on the south bank of the Saint Lawrence River just east of Montreal. It lies on the west flank of Mont Saint-Bruno, one of the Monteregian Hills. The population as of the Canada 2021 Census was 26,273.

The city is well known to Montrealers and its neighbouring population for Mont Saint-Bruno, location to both Mont-Saint-Bruno National Park and Ski Mont Saint-Bruno, a ski facility and school.

There are two prevailing hypotheses on the origin of the city's name:

- That the city was named after Bruno of Cologne and the Montarville seigneury. The name "Montarville" is a homonym of a village of Eure-et-Loir in France: Montharville, whose etymology is uncertain. The name was written in its Latin form, Mons Harvilla in the 12th century – in other words "Haric's farm's mount", a name of Germanic origins also found in Harville (Hairici villa, 9th century). However, this uncommon composition of a Roman appellation ("mont") associated with the Norman toponymy "-ville" place name casts doubts on this explication. It could be the name of an unidentified Germanic individual.
- Quebec's toponymy commission suggests another hypothesis to explain the origin of the city's name. "Montarville" could be a portmanteau of "montagne" (French for mountain) and "Boucherville" after Pierre Boucher de Boucherville, the region's first seigneur. The hypothesis rests on the fact that the descendants of de Boucherville were named Montarville, Niverville, etc. The patron saint of the city could be explained by the sale of the seigneury to François-Pierre Bruneau, whose name was slightly transformed.

== History ==
=== The seigneury of Montarville ===
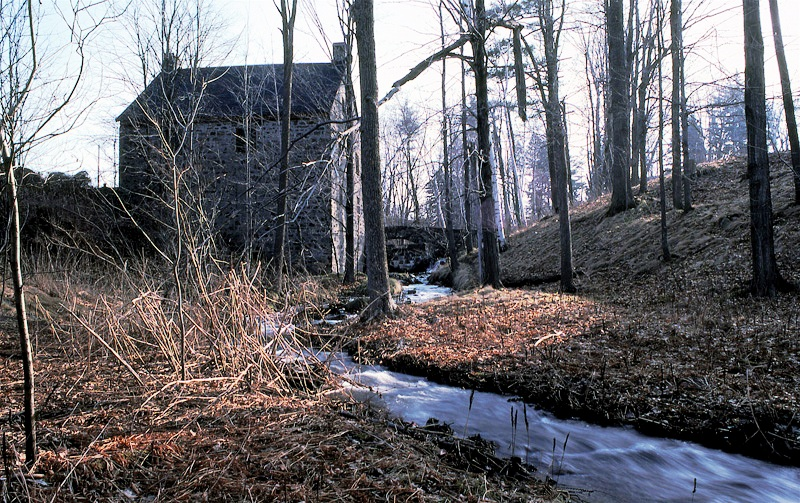
The old mill at Mont-Saint-Bruno National Park

Pierre Boucher de Boucherville Junior was granted the Montarville seigneury in 1710 by the governor of New France Philippe de Rigaud de Vaudreuil. In 1723, it was noted that clearing had not begun and no one was inhabiting the seigneury yet.

The ownership remained in the Boucher family until 1829, when René Boucher de la Bruère sold half his land and his rights as a seigneur to François-Pierre Bruneau of Montréal. He died in 1851 and his brother Oliver-Théophile Bruneau (who was the first professor of anatomy at McGill University), was the last seigneur of Montarville from 1851 until the seigneural system was abolished in 1854.

While agriculture was the primary subsistence and economical activity of the region, the seigneury of Montarville, thanks to its proximity to Mount Saint-Bruno, benefited much from the industrial activity that developed around the hydraulic power it could harvest from the mountain's many ponds and streams. The first water mill was erected in 1725 and in the 19th century, they numbered six in the territory and permitted such activities as grinding grain, milling wood, tanning leather and carding and spinning wool.

The 19th century also saw the diversification of the seigneury's agricultural activities through increased animal husbandry, orchards, and maple syrup collection.

=== From parish to village to city ===
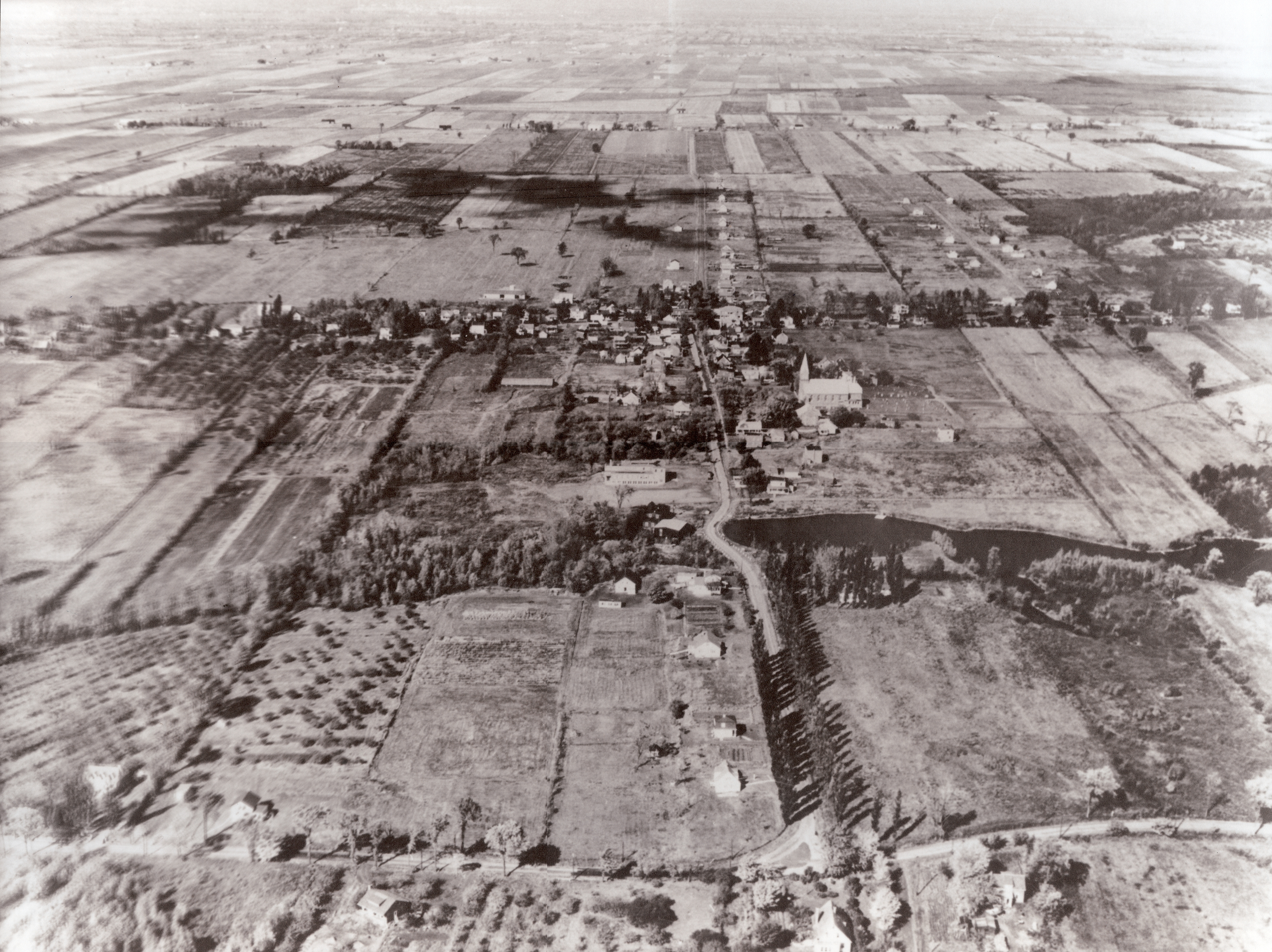
Aerial view of Saint-Bruno in 1952

At the beginning of the 19th century, families residing on the western flank of the mountain were under the clerical responsibility of the parish of Boucherville while families from the southern flank were under the responsibility of the parish of Saint-Joseph de Chambly. As a consequence, the tithe was being paid to two different parishes, so in 1809 a first request to transform the seigneury into a parish was made to M^{gr} Joseph-Octave Plessis, Archbishop of Quebec. This request was met with a refusal. It would be thirty-three years before the Montarvillans attempted to form into their own parish again.

It is worth mentioning that in 1838 during the Patriotes Rebellion, François-Pierre Bruneau's manor was occupied by the Patriotes and that one of them, André Proteau, was from the seigneury.

In 1842, a petition totaling about sixty signatures was presented to M^{gr} Ignace Bourget, Bishop of Montreal who agreed to the demand, and in the same year he signed a canonical decree officiating the creation of the parish of Saint-Bruno. François-Pierre Bruneau was honored with the choice of the titular saint, Saint Bruno.

In line with the Durham Report's recommendation to modernize municipal structures in 1840 (culminating in the abolition of the seigneury system in 1854) and the Acte pour abroger certaines ordonnances et pour faire de meilleures dispositions pour l'établissement d'autorités locales et municipales dans le Bas-Canada (Act to abrogate certain ordinances and to make better dispositions to establish local and municipal authorities in Lower-Canada), on 1 July 1845 the Legislative Assembly created more than 325 municipal corporations in eastern Canada of which Saint-Bruno, then with a population of 800, was a part. The following year on 9 October 1846, the parish municipality of Saint-Bruno was born through an official proclamation.

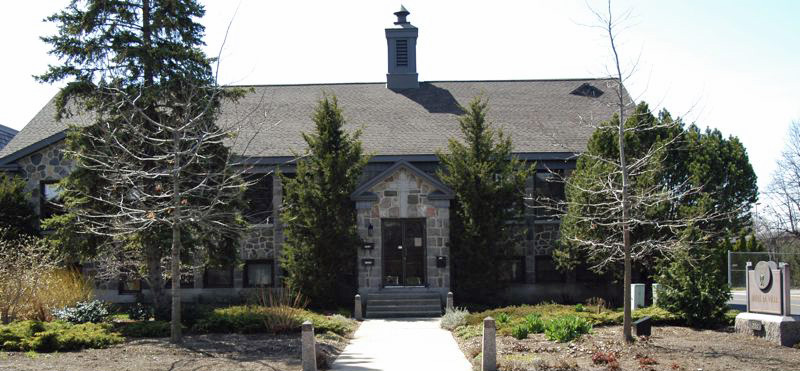
City hall

For a few years, Saint-Bruno remained part of the municipality of Chambly but in 1855, as mandated by the Loi constituent en municipalités toutes paroisses de plus de 300 personnes (Law making into a municipality every parish of more than 300 persons), the parish municipality became fully autonomous and its two names, "Saint-Bruno" and "Montarville", were joined into the designation still used to this day.

It incorporated as a city in 1958.

=== Merger and demerger ===
In 2000, the Parti Québécois governments of Lucien Bouchard and Bernard Landry introduced a series of legislative measures with the intent of reorganizing and merging many of Quebec's municipalities. In 2002, following the adoption of bill 170, Saint-Bruno merged with other municipalities on Montreal's south shore to form the city of Longueuil. Following public outcry and a referendum, the city demerged from Longueuil and was reconstituted on 1 January 2006, but remained within the agglomeration of Longueuil, which remains responsible for a series of services to the population.

== Demographics ==
Historical populations
Year	Pop.	±%
1851	1,164	—
1861	1,719	+47.7%
1871	1,406	−18.2%
1881	894	−36.4%
1891	721	−19.4%
1901	872	+20.9%
1911	855	−1.9%
1921	927	+8.4%
1931	1,024	+10.5%
1941	1,262	+23.2%
1951	1,816	+43.9%
1961	6,760	+272.2%
1971	15,780	+133.4%
1981	22,880	+45.0%
1991	23,849	+4.2%
1996	23,714	−0.6%
2001	23,843	+0.5%
2006	24,388	+2.3%
2011	26,107	+7.0%
2016	26,197	+0.3%
2021	26,273	+0.3%

In the 2021 Census of Population conducted by Statistics Canada, Saint-Bruno-de-Montarville had a population of 26,273 living in 10,446 of its 10,629 total private dwellings, a change of 0.3% from its 2016 population of 26,197. With a land area of 42.85 km^{2} (16.54 sq mi), it had a population density of 613.1/km^{2} (1,588.0/sq mi) in 2021.

Language

The 2021 census found that about 85% of residents spoke French as a mother tongue (including persons who had more than one mother tongue), and that about 11% of residents spoke English as a mother tongue (also including persons who had more than one mother tongue). The next most common mother tongue was Spanish.

Native language	Population	Pct (%)
French	21,265	82.0%
English	2,045	7.9%
Both English and French	615	2.4%
French and a non-official language	180	0.7%
English, French and a non-official language	40	0.2%
English and a non-official language	35	0.1%
Spanish	405	1.6%
Arabic	235	0.9%
Portuguese	145	0.6%
Mandarin	140	0.5%
Russian	105	0.4%
Romanian	100	0.4%
Italian	90	0.3%
German	70	0.3%
Polish	50	0.2%
Iranian Persian	45	0.2%
Vietnamese	30	0.1%
Ukrainian	25	0.1%
Dutch	25	0.1%
Greek	25	0.1%

== Attractions ==
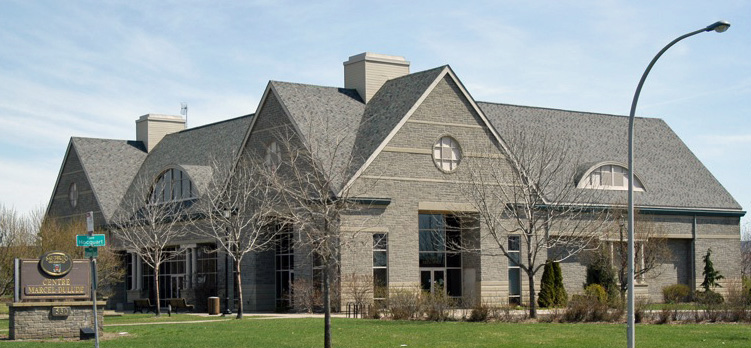
Centre Marcel-Dulude Community Centre

The town resides at the foot of Mont Saint-Bruno, one of the mountains that make up the Monteregian Hills. The mountain is home to a provincial park, Parc National du Mont-Saint-Bruno, as well as a ski hill, Ski Mont Saint-Bruno.

== Government ==
=== List of former mayors ===
- 1866-1868: Joseph-Octave Leduc
- 1868-1870: Antoine-Dominique Hurtubise
- 1870-1872: Joseph-Octave Leduc
- 1872-1874: Tancrède Boucher de Grosbois, M.D.
- 1874-1877: Timothé Sauriol
- 1878: Jérémie Huet
- 1879-1886: Timothé Sauriol
- 1886: Michel Provost
- 1887-1891: Toussaint Bachand
- 1891-1893: Frank Bruneau
- 1893: Vital Delière
- 1894: Louis Baillargeon
- 1895-1902: Vital Delière
- 1903-1906: Ephrem Huette
- 1907: Clovis Mongeau
- 1908: Stanislas Boissy
- 1909-1910: Lucien Caillé

- 1911-1912: Philias Grisé
- 1913-1916: Oscar Berthiaume
- 1917-1920: Louis-Arthur Léonard
- 1921-1932: Armand Huet
- 1933-1939: Paul-Émile Huet
- 1939-1949: Ernest Dulude
- 1949-1952: J. Donat Fournier, M.D.
- 1952-1953: Ernest Dulude
- 1953-1955: Henri C. Bois
- 1955-1959: Hubert Kéroack
- 1960-1968: Gérard Filion
- 1968-1969: Claude Allard
- 1969-1971: Gérard Lepage
- 1971-1975: J. James Verge
- 1975-1979: J. Y. Serge Dazé
- 1979-2001: Marcel Dulude
- 2002-2006: Merged with the city of Longueuil
- 2007-2013: Claude Benjamin
- 2013-2021: Martin Murray
- 2021-current: Ludovic Grisé Farand

== Infrastructure ==
Saint-Bruno-de-Montarville is served by the Saint-Bruno commuter rail station on the Réseau de transport métropolitain's Mont-Saint-Hilaire line. Local bus service is provided by the Réseau de transport de Longueuil.

== Education ==
The South Shore Protestant Regional School Board previously served the municipality. The French language school board Commission Scolaire des Patriotes oversees 3 primary education schools (École Albert-Schweitzer, École De Montarville and École Monseigneur-Gilles-Gervais) and one secondary education school (École Secondaire du Mont-Bruno). The English language school board Riverside School Board oversees primary schools Mount Bruno School and Courtland Park International.

== Notable people ==
The following are notable residents or past residents of Saint-Bruno:

- Maryse Andraos, writer
- Joël Bouchard, retired professional NHL hockey player
- Claude Crépeau, computer scientist
- L. Denis Desautels, former Auditor General of Canada
- Guy Laliberté, shareholder and founder of Cirque du Soleil
- Georges Larivière, professor, writer, ice hockey coach
- Marie-Mai, pop singer
- Serge Savard, retired professional NHL hockey player
- Sword, Canadian heavy metal band
- Maxime Talbot, professional NHL hockey player
- Sébastien Leblanc, retired professional tennis player
- Annette and Cécile Dionne, first quintuplets known to have survived their infancy

== Gallery ==
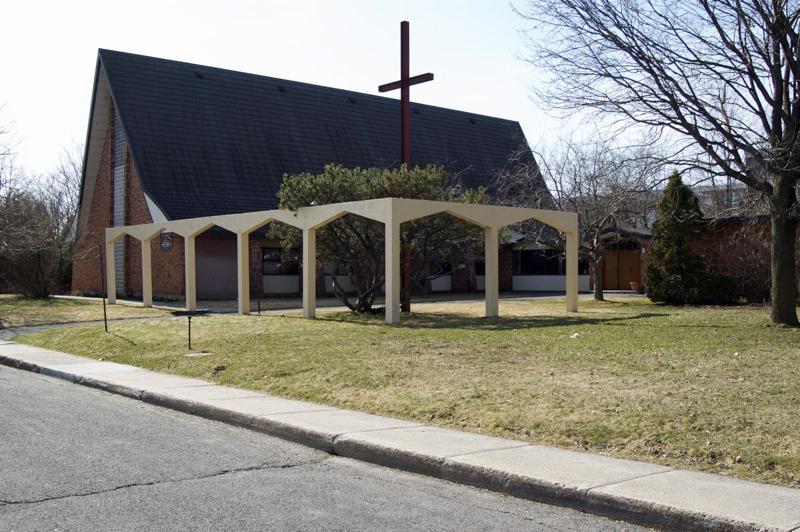
United Church

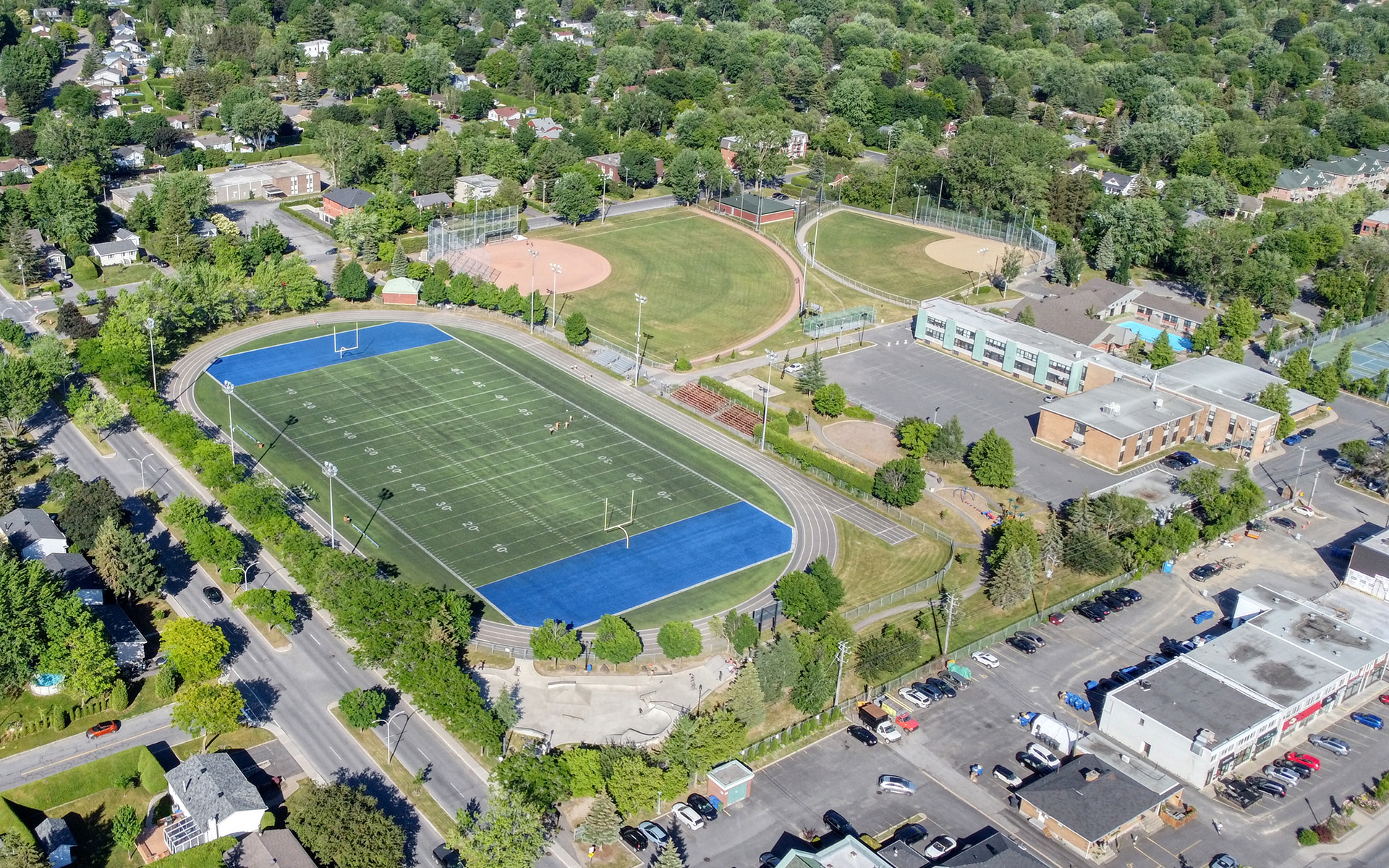
Rabastalière park

== See also ==
- List of cities in Quebec
