= Charles-François Painchaud =

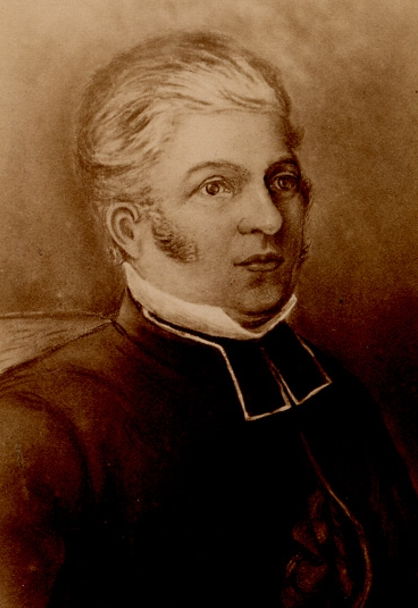
- Born: September 9, 1782; Isle-aux-Grues, Quebec
- Died: February 9, 1838 (aged 55); Sainte-Anne-de-la-Pocatière (La Pocatière), Lower Canada
- Occupations: Roman Catholic priest, missionary, and educator

Charles-François Painchaud (September 9, 1782 – February 9, 1838) was a Roman Catholic priest and educator in Lower Canada. He founded the Collège de Sainte-Anne-de-la-Pocatière.

He was born in Isle-aux-Grues, the son of François Painchaud and Angélique Drouin, later moving to Quebec City with his parents, and was educated at the Petit Séminaire de Québec and Séminaire de Québec. He was ordained in 1805 and served as assistant priest at the cathedral in Quebec City. A few months later, he was posted to the mission at the Baie des Chaleurs, serving there until 1814 when he became parish priest at Sainte-Anne-de-la-Pocatière. In 1827, after Painchaud's plan for a college was supported by archbishop Bernard-Claude Panet, construction began. Although the finances of the institution were not secure, the college was able to survive at first as a result of Painchaud's efficient use of limited funding and later due to a series of bequests. Painchaud died in Sainte-Anne-de-la-Pocatière at the age of 55.
