= Ottawa-Bonnechere Graben =

Rift valley extending from near Montréal through Ottawa in Canada

Coordinates: 45.5767°N 76.9162°W

- Graben
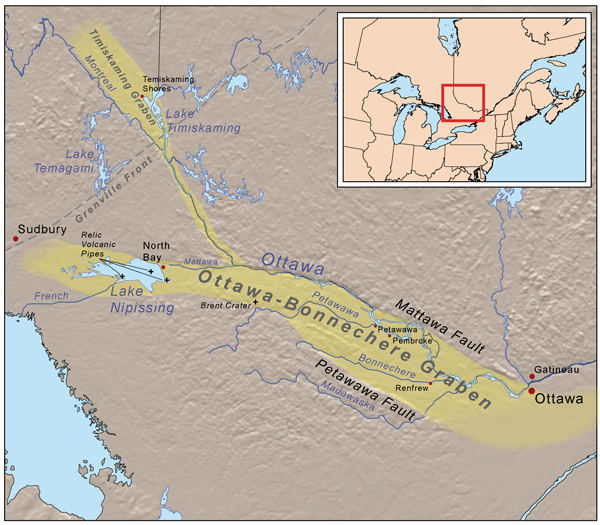
- Map of the Ottawa-Bonnechere and Timiskaming grabens
- Location: Ontario and Quebec, Canada
- Part of: Saint Lawrence rift system
- Age: Late Proterozoic to Early Paleozoic
- Geology: Graben

Dimensions
  - Length: 700 km (435 mi)

The Ottawa-Bonnechere Graben (also known as the Ottawa Graben) is a geological structure that coincides with a 55 km (34 mi) wide topographic depression extending from near Montréal through Ottawa. It is part of the Saint Lawrence rift system that also includes the seismically active Saguenay graben. This rift valley was formed when the Earth's crust moved downward about a kilometre between two major fault zones known as the Mattawa and Petawawa faults.

== Geography ==
The Ottawa-Bonnechere Graben measures about 700 km (435 mi), running from the Montreal area on the east to near Sudbury and Lake Nipissing on the west. On the east, it joins the Saint Lawrence rift system, a half-graben which extends more than 1000 km along the Saint Lawrence River valley and links the Ottawa and Saguenay Graben.

The 200 km (124 mi) segment of the Ottawa-Bonnechere Graben west of Ottawa was the first to be recognized as a graben. Since then, it has been traced west to Lake Nipissing, and northwestwards from the confluence of the Mattawa and Ottawa Rivers up the valley of the latter stream to Lake Timiskaming and the Montreal River valley. This latter branch is the Timiskaming Graben. At the rifts' western termini, the main faults split into divergent smaller faults. The graben has been interpreted as a Late Proterozoic to Early Paleozoic failed arm of the Iapetus Ocean, the precursor to the Atlantic Ocean. The main Ottawa-Bonnechere Graben is associated with collapse of the regional carbonate platform and formation of deep water shale basins by ~452 mya (million years ago); similar events formed the Temiskaming Graben ~449–451 mya. These grabens were reactivated during the breakup of supercontinent Pangaea some 150 mya.

== Geology ==
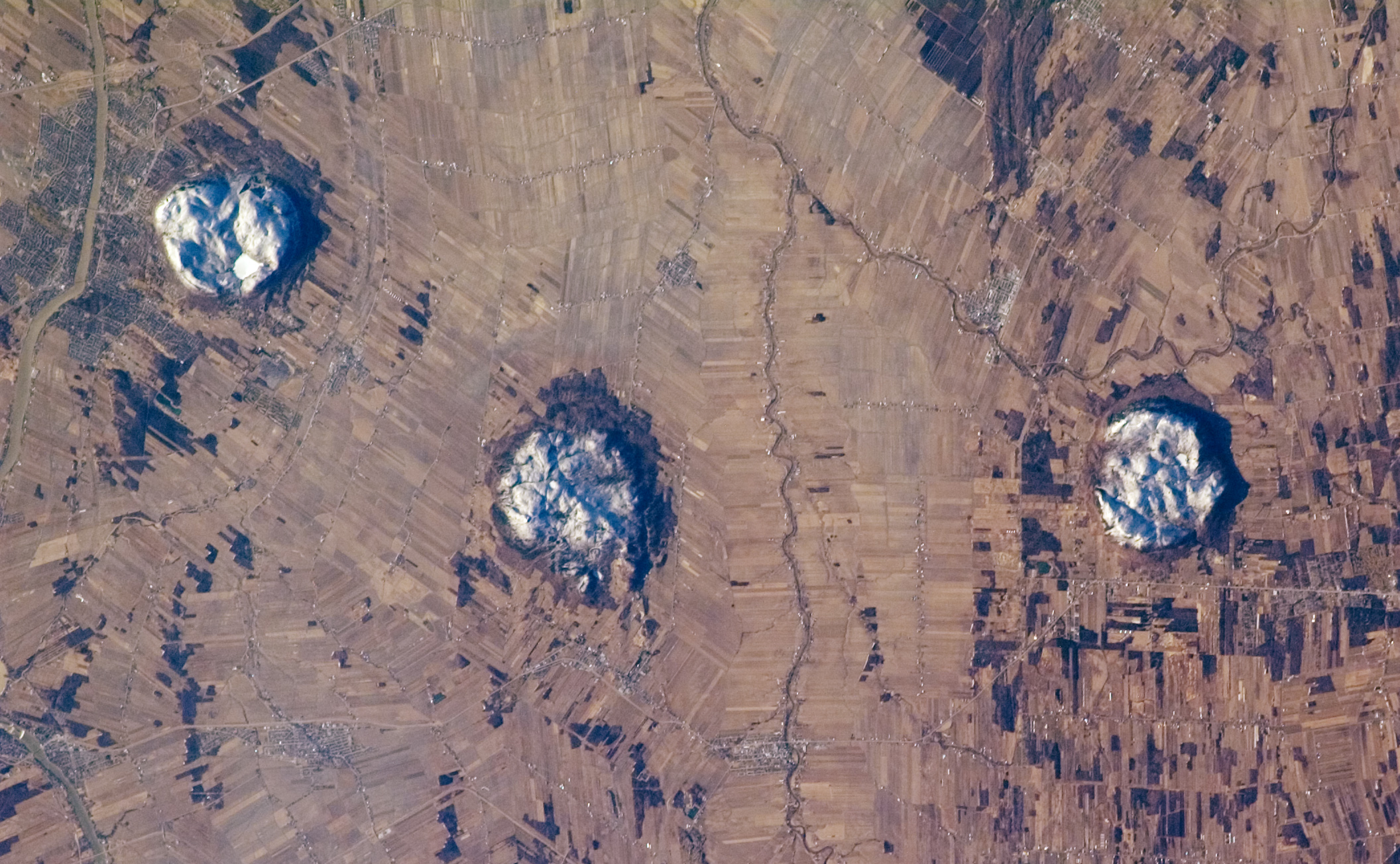
Three of the central Monteregian Hills viewed from space (from left: Mont Saint-Hilaire, Mont Rougemont and Mont Yamaska).

Since the Late Proterozoic to Early Paleozoic, erosion has removed the volcanic peaks, exposing a number of relic volcanic pipes, such as Callander Bay and the Manitou Islands in Lake Nipissing.

These features are subterranean geological structures formed by the violent, supersonic eruption of deep-origin volcanoes. Batholiths and dikes were also exposed by erosion, such as the Timber Lake, Mulock, West Arm, Powassan and Bonfield batholiths. The expressions of a thick pile of dominantly mafic, bimodal volcanics and the Tibbit Hill volcanics in the Humber Zone of the Quebec Appalachians are believed to be related to the formation of the Ottawa-Bonnechere Graben. The precise age of these volcanics is unknown but they are either early Cambrian and late Precambrian. This volcanism was probably coeval with the emplacement of the Grenville dike swarm.

Minor but significant igneous activity occurred during the Mesozoic era, including kimberlite emplacement during the Jurassic period, and the development of alkalic intrusions along the Ottawa-Bonnechere Graben and elsewhere in Ontario. This second episode of alkalic volcanism occurred along the eastern part of the graben in the early Cretaceous.

The products of this event are the Monteregian Hills in Montérégie, Quebec. These are thought to have formed as a result of the North American plate sliding westward over a long-lived centre of upwelling magma called the New England hotspot, and is the eroded remnants of intrusive stocks.

These intrusive stocks have been variously interpreted as the feeder intrusions of long extinct volcanoes, which would have been active about 125 million years ago, or as intrusives that never breached the surface in volcanic activity. Of all these features, Mont Saint-Hilaire is the best known as a source of rare specimens.

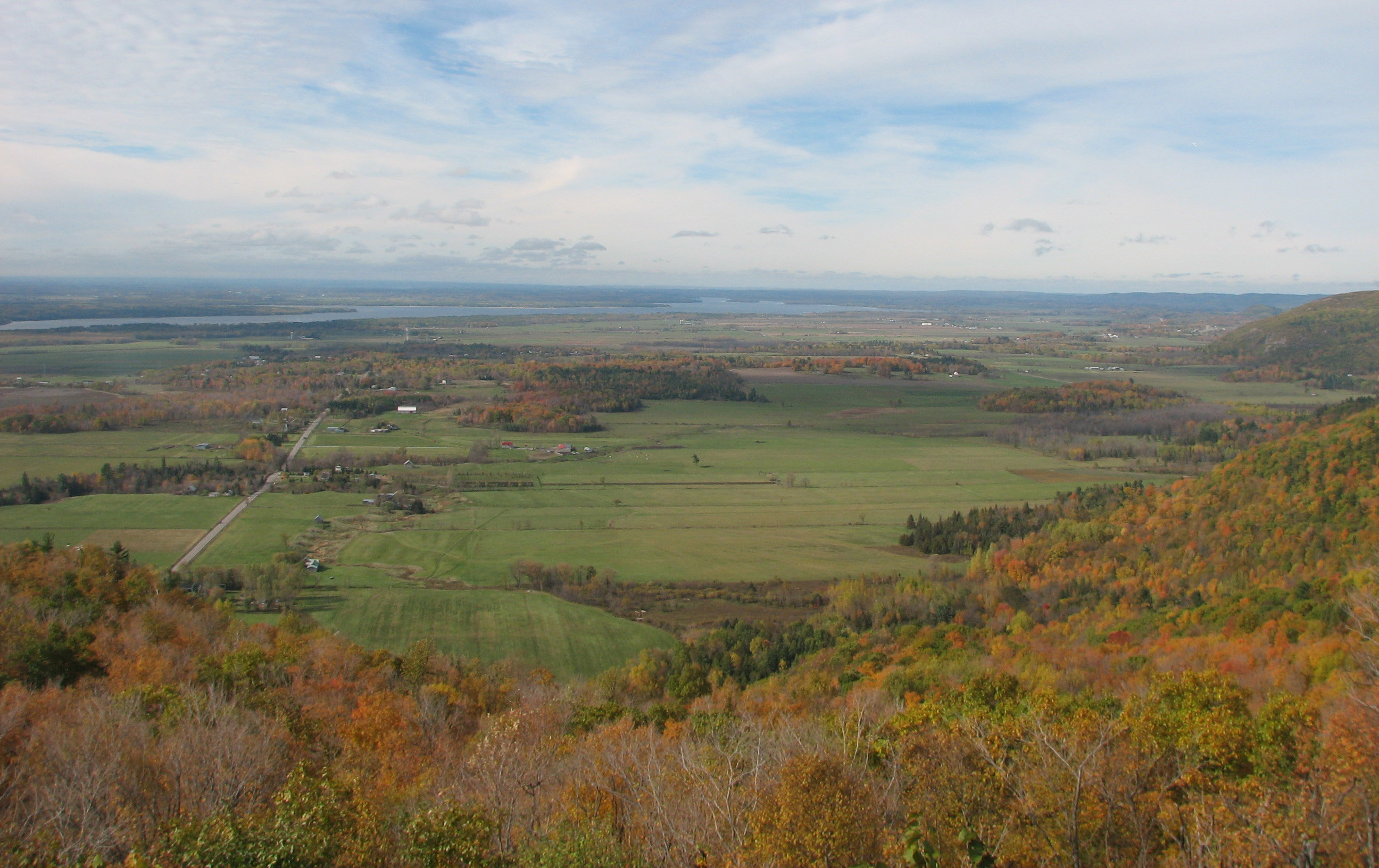
View of the Ottawa Valley from the Gatineau Hills

Along the northern side of the Ottawa-Bonnechere Graben lies an escarpment that forms the southern edge of the Gatineau Hills. This escarpment, called the Eardley Escarpment, makes this part of the graben a popular location for rock climbers and hikers, offering a view of the relatively flat fields below, which extend to the Ottawa River.

On or near a branch of the Ottawa-Bonnechere Graben lies the Brent impact crater. It is 3.8 km (2.4 mi) in diameter and the age is estimated about 400 million years (Early Devonian). The impact crater, which was first recognized in 1951 from aerial photographs, formed in Precambrian gneisses. Geophysical and diamond drilling investigations show that the crater has a present depth of about 425 m (1,390 ft) but is partly filled with sedimentary rocks with a thickness of about 274 m (899 ft). The rocks beneath the crater floor are thoroughly fragmented over a depth of about 610 m (2,000 ft). Like the similar Pingualuit crater, the Brent crater is attributed to the high speed impact of a giant meteorite. It is calculated that the impact released energy equaling 250 megatons of TNT and occurred when this area was probably covered by a shallow sea.

== History ==
The depressions formed by the graben across the rugged Canadian Shield were a spillway for the Great Lakes after the last ice age. Later they became a thoroughfare for exploration and trade. These depressions now contain the Ottawa River and its tributary the Mattawa, which rises at Trout Lake near Lake Nipissing. The latter is the source of the French River, which drains into Lake Huron. This water route, with few portages, connected Lake Huron and the Saint Lawrence River by a much shorter route than through the lower Great Lakes. It was the mainline of the French-Canadian voyageurs engaged in the fur trade; they took canoes on the waterways along this route from Montreal to the upper Great Lakes and the pays d'en haut—the "upper country" in the old Northwest. The valley of the Ottawa and Montreal Rivers and Lake Timiskaming was also part of a branch route to James Bay in the days of the fur brigades. The valleys are now used by more modern forms of transportation, including the Canadian Pacific Railway and the Trans-Canada Highway.

After the arrival of European settlers in North America, the Mattawa River was an important transportation corridor for native peoples of the region and formed part of the water route leading west to Lake Superior in the days of the fur trade. Canoes travelling north up the Ottawa turned left to enter the Mattawa, reaching Lake Nipissing by way of "La Vase Portage", an 11 km (7 mi) stretch of water and portages. In the 19th century, the river provided access to large untouched stands of white pine. The river was also used to transport logs to sawmills. While logging is still an important industry in this region, almost the full length of the river has been designated as a Canadian Heritage River, and as such, its shores are now protected from further development and logging. Today, the river and lakes are mainly used for recreation.

== See also ==
- Midcontinent Rift System – Geological rift in the centre of the North American continent
- Ottawa Valley – Valley in Ontario and Quebec in Canada
- Volcanology of Canada – Volcanic activity in Canada
- Volcanology of Eastern Canada – Volcanic activity in Eastern Canada
