= Mont Saint-Grégoire =

Mountain in Quebec, Canada

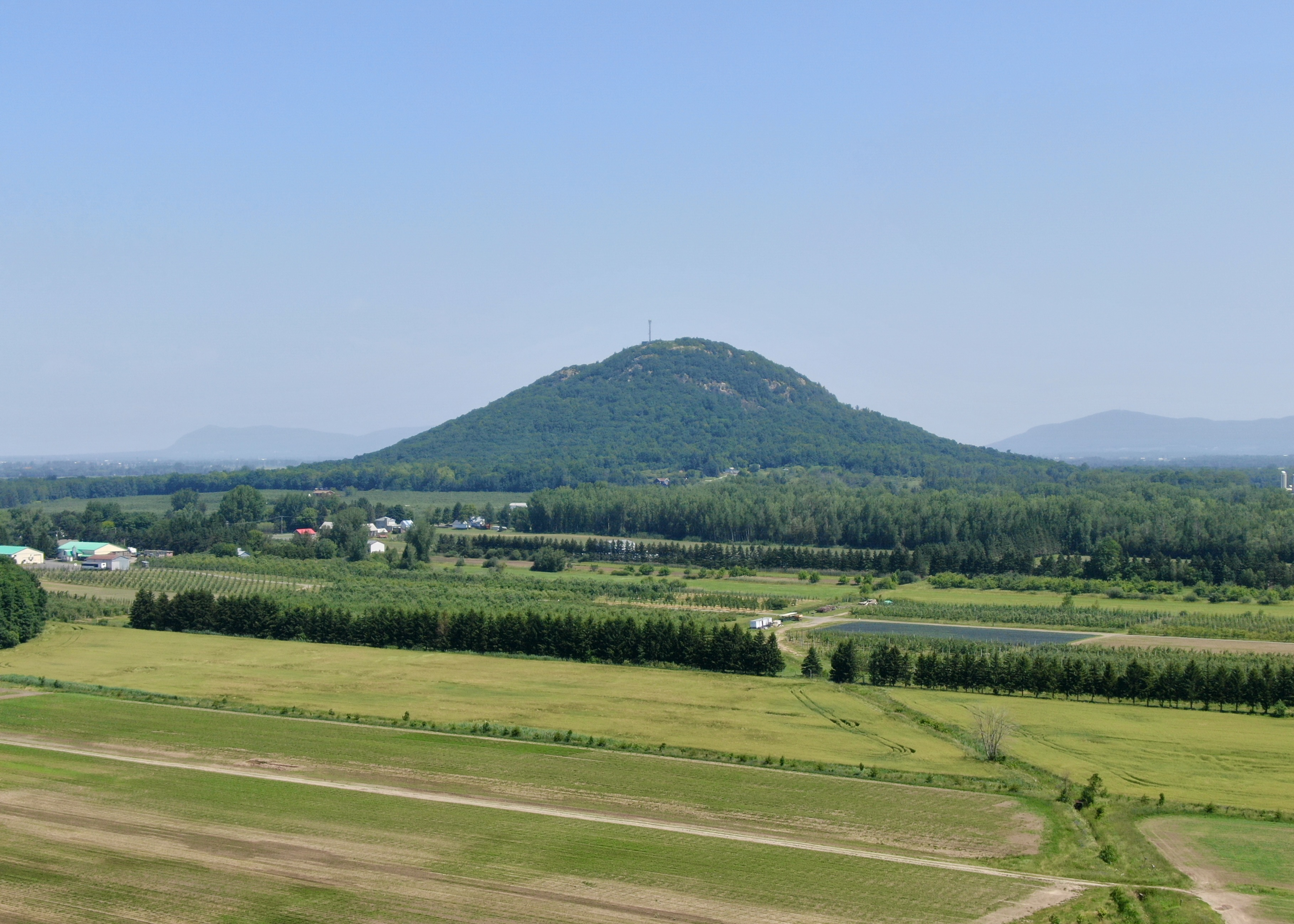
- Mont Saint-Grégoire

Highest point
- Elevation: 251 m (823 ft)
- Coordinates: 45°21′29″N 73°09′08″W

Geography
- Location: Mont-Saint-Grégoire, 10 km (6 mi) east of Saint-Jean-sur-Richelieu, Quebec, Canada
- Parent range: Monteregian Hills
- Topo map: NTS 31H6 Saint-Jean-sur-Richelieu

Geology
- Rock age: Early Cretaceous
- Mountain type: Intrusive stock

Mont Saint-Grégoire (French pronunciation: [mɔ̃ sɛ̃ ɡʁeɡwaʁ]; height: 251 m (823 ft)) is a mountain in the Montérégie region of southern Quebec, Canada. It is composed of essexite and syenite, strongly contrasting with the surrounding sedimentary rocks. The area around Mont Saint-Grégoire is known for its maple syrup production, as well as some wine production.

The name was changed in 1923 from Mount Johnson. Mont Saint-Grégoire was named in honour of Pope Gregory I, who was also known as Gregory the Great.

== Geology ==
It is thought that Mont Saint-Grégoire might be the deep extension of a vastly eroded ancient volcanic complex, which was probably active about 125 million years ago. The mountain was created when the North American Plate moved westward over the New England hotspot, along with the other mountains of the Monteregian Hills. It forms part of the vast Great Meteor hotspot track.
