= Mont Yamaska =

Mountain in Quebec, Canada

Mont Yamaska Wigwômadenek
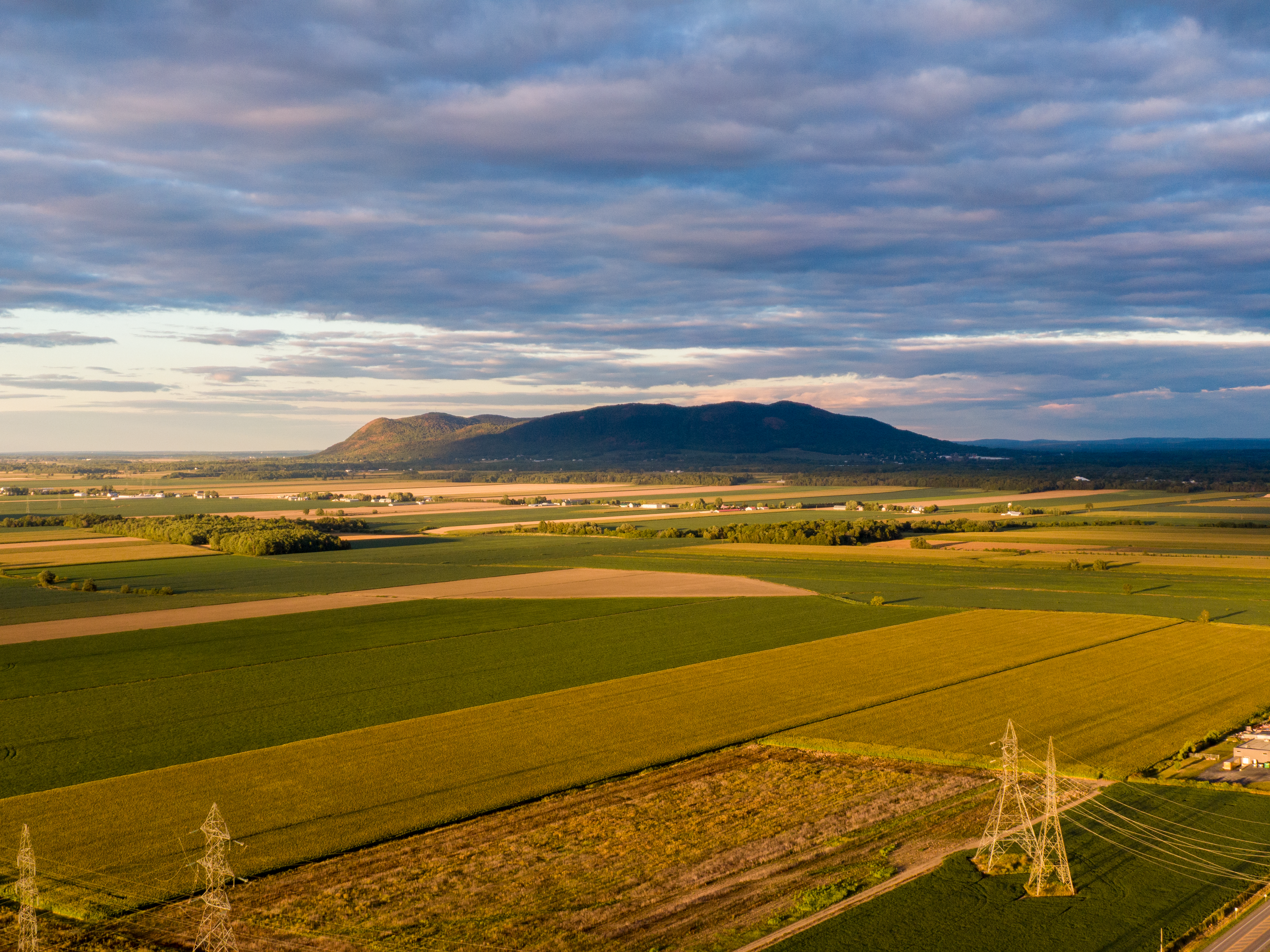
- Mont Yamaska in 2025

Highest point
- Elevation: 411 m (1,348 ft)
- Coordinates: 45°27′25″N 72°52′19″W

Geography
- Location: Saint-Paul-d'Abbotsford, 12 kilometers northwest of Granby, Quebec, Canada
- Parent range: Monteregian Hills
- Topo map: NTS 31H7 Granby

Geology
- Rock age: Early Cretaceous
- Mountain type: Intrusive stock

Mont Yamaska (French pronunciation: [mɔ̃ jamaska]; 'Mount Yamaska'; in Abenaki, Wigwômadenek)) is part of the Monteregian Hills in southern Quebec. Its summit stands 411 m (1,348 ft) above sea level. This mountain is largely covered with deciduous forest dominated by sugar maple. Some apple orchards are raised on lower slopes.

== Geology ==
Mont Yamaska is composed of igneous rock and hornfels. The igneous rock includes much gabbro, essexite, a titanium-rich clinopyroxenite called yamaskite, and a small area of nepheline syenite. Mont Yamaska might be the deep extension of a vastly eroded ancient volcanic complex, which was probably active about 125 million years ago. The mountain was created when the North American Plate moved westward over the New England hotspot, along with the other mountains of the Monteregian Hills that form part of the Great Meteor hotspot track.

== See also ==
Yamaska National Park
