= Monteregian Hills =

Linear chain of monadnocks in Quebec, Canada

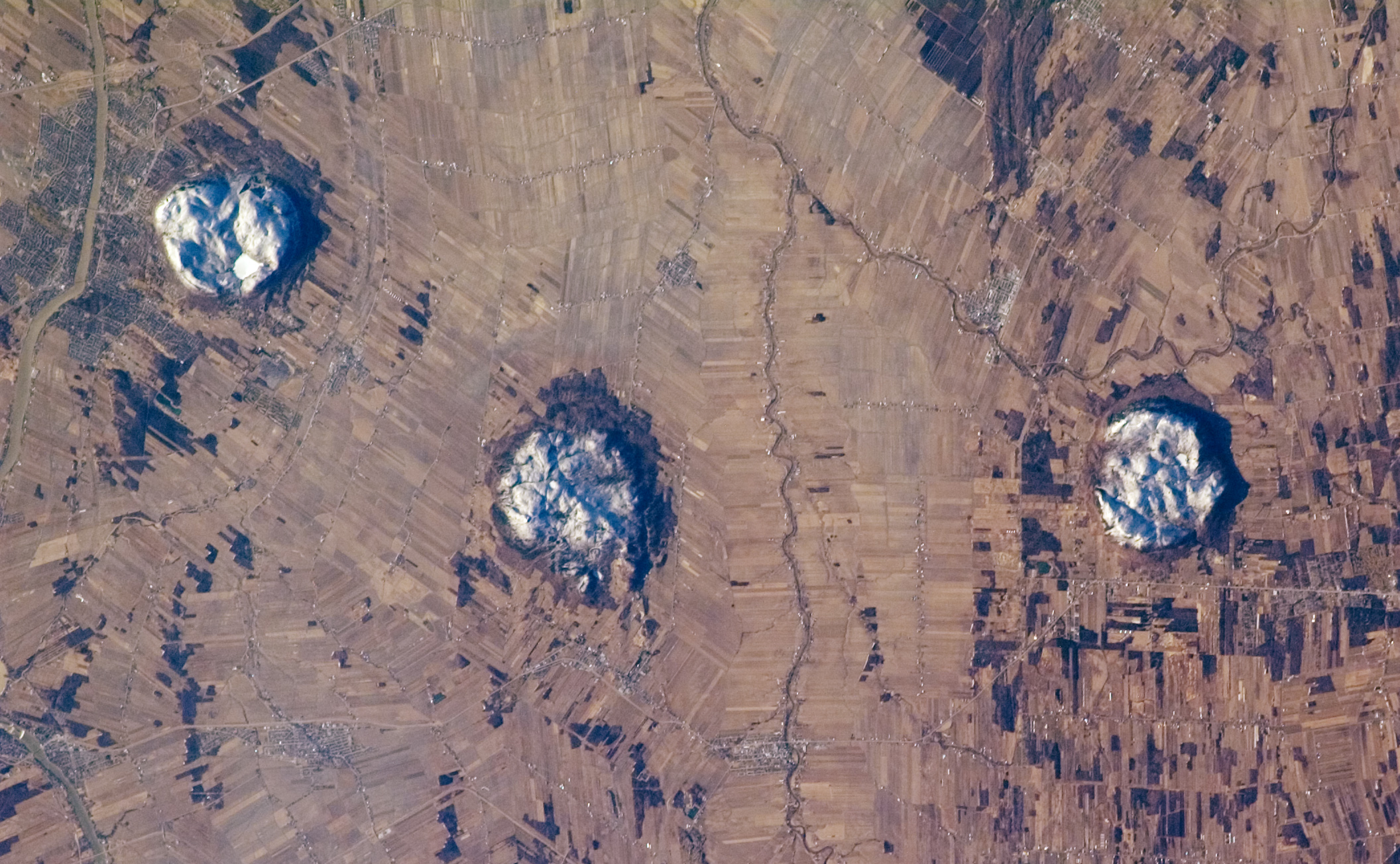
- Three of the central Monteregian Hills (from left: Mont Saint-Hilaire, Mont Rougemont and Mont Yamaska) viewed from space

Highest point
- Peak: Mont Megantic
- Elevation: 1,110 m (3,640 ft)
- Coordinates: 45°27′21″N 71°09′10″W

Geography
- Location within Quebec
- Country: Canada
- Province: Quebec
- Range coordinates: 45°29′N 73°03′W

Geology
- Rock age: Early Cretaceous

The Monteregian Hills (French: Collines Montérégiennes) is a linear chain of isolated mountains in Montreal, Montérégie, Laurentides, and Argenteuil, between the Laurentian Mountains and the Appalachians.

== Etymology ==
The first definition of the Monteregian Hills came about in 1903 when Montreal geologist Frank Dawson Adams began referring to Mount Royal (Latin, Mons Regius) and mountains of similar geology in the Saint Lawrence Lowlands as the "Royal Mountains" (French: montagnes royales). Other mountains in the chain included Mont Saint-Bruno, Mont Saint-Hilaire, Mont Saint-Grégoire, Mont Rougemont, Mont Yamaska, Mont Shefford, and Mont Brome.

It was only later that Mont Mégantic, the Oka Hills, as well as the Saint-André and d'Iberville formations, were added to the list.

== Geology ==
Each mountain in the chain consists of an erosional remnant of Cretaceous intrusive igneous rock and associated hornfels, which are more resistant to weathering than the surrounding sedimentary rock. All of the mountains have dark-coloured mafic rock such as gabbro and essexite; some also have large areas of pulaskite, syenite, and other light-coloured rock.

The Monteregian Hills are part of the Great Meteor hotspot track, formed as a result of the North American Plate sliding westward over the long-lived New England hotspot, and are the eroded remnants of intrusive stocks. These intrusive stocks have been variously interpreted as the feeder intrusions of long extinct volcanoes, which would have been active about 125 million years ago, or as intrusives that never breached the surface in volcanic activity. The lack of an obvious track west of the Monteregian Hills may be due either to failure of the plume to penetrate the Canadian Shield, to the lack of recognizable intrusions, or to strengthening of the plume when it approached the Monteregian Hills region. However, there is evidence the hotspot track extends northwestwards, including epeirogenic uplift, mantle velocity anomalies and kimberlitic volcanic features (e.g. the Attawapiskat, Kirkland Lake and Lake Timiskaming kimberlite fields) that become older away from the Monteregian Hills.

The shallow, rocky sandy loam soils of the summits are mostly covered in forest. Where the underlying rock is rich in olivine, as over large areas of Mont Saint-Bruno and Mont Rougemont, these soils are classed as dystric brunisol. Podzol tends to develop over rock which lacks olivine, although many of these podzols lack an eluvial (Ae) horizon. Lower slopes are covered with aprons of gravel or sand. The sandy soils are usually podzols with classic Ae development; they often have subsoil hardpan and are undesirable for agriculture. The free-draining gravels are preferred for apple orchards, which grow in thermal belts where cold air can drain to the valley floor.

Monteregian Hills
Name	Height	Age	Coordinates	Location
St. Andrews formation	130 metres (430 ft)	n/a	45°55"N, 74°31'W	Saint-André-d'Argenteuil
Oka Hills	249 metres (817 ft)	118-138 myr	45°30'53"N, 74°6'52"W	Oka
Mount Royal	233 metres (764 ft)	118-138 myr	45°30'23"N, 73°35'20"W	Montreal
Mont Saint-Bruno	218 metres (715 ft)	118-136 myr	45°33'18"N, 73°18'36"W	Saint-Bruno-de-Montarville
Mont Saint-Hilaire	411 metres (1,348 ft)	135 myr	45°33'8"N, 73°9'50"W	Mont-Saint-Hilaire
Mont Saint-Grégoire	251 metres (823 ft)	119 myr	45°21'29"N, 73°9'8"W	Mont-Saint-Grégoire
Mont Rougemont	381 metres (1,250 ft)	137 myr	45°28'36"N, 73°3'17"W	Rougemont
Mont Yamaska	416 metres (1,365 ft)	120-140 myr	45°27'25"N, 72°52'19"W	Saint-Paul-d'Abbotsford
Mont Shefford	526 metres (1,726 ft)	120-130 myr	45°21'49"N, 72°37'33"W	Shefford
Mont Brome	553 metres (1,814 ft)	118-138 myr	45°17'21"N, 72°38'16"W	Bromont
Mont Mégantic	1,110 metres (3,640 ft)	128-133 myr	45°27'21"N, 71°9'10"W	Notre-Dame-des-Bois

== Gallery ==
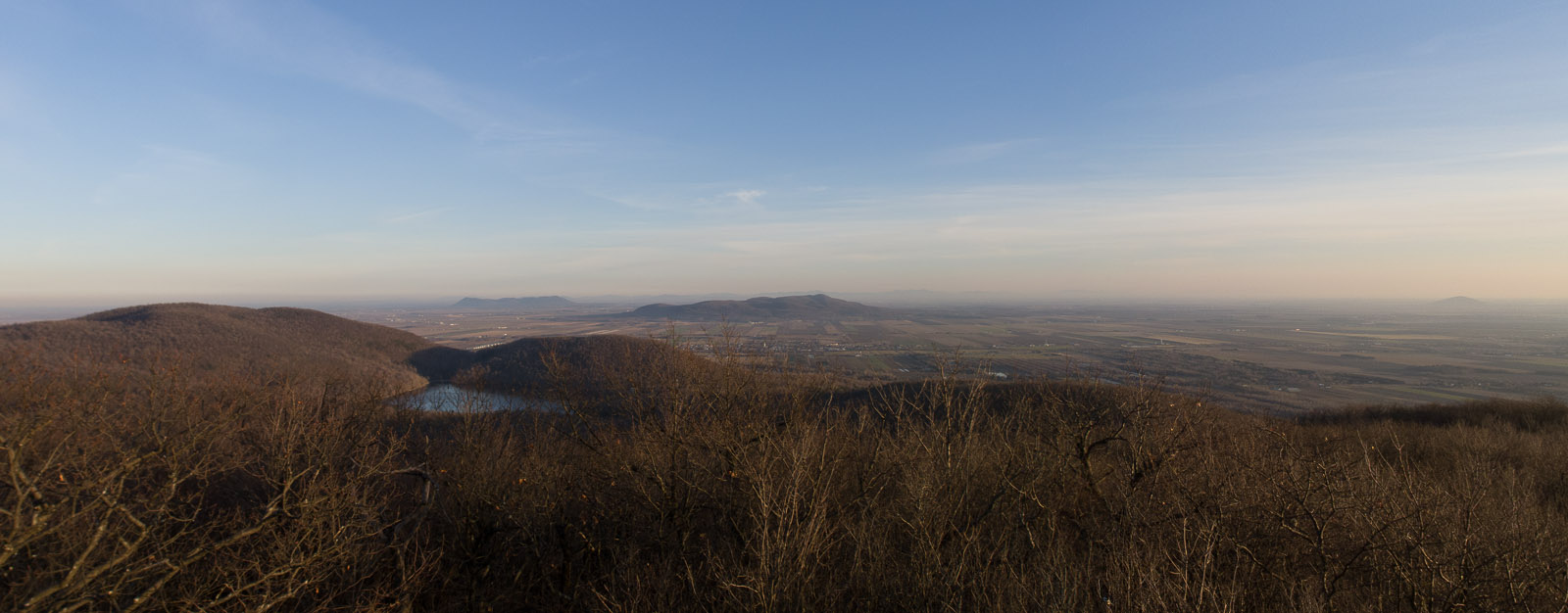
Four of the Monteregian Hills in the late fall

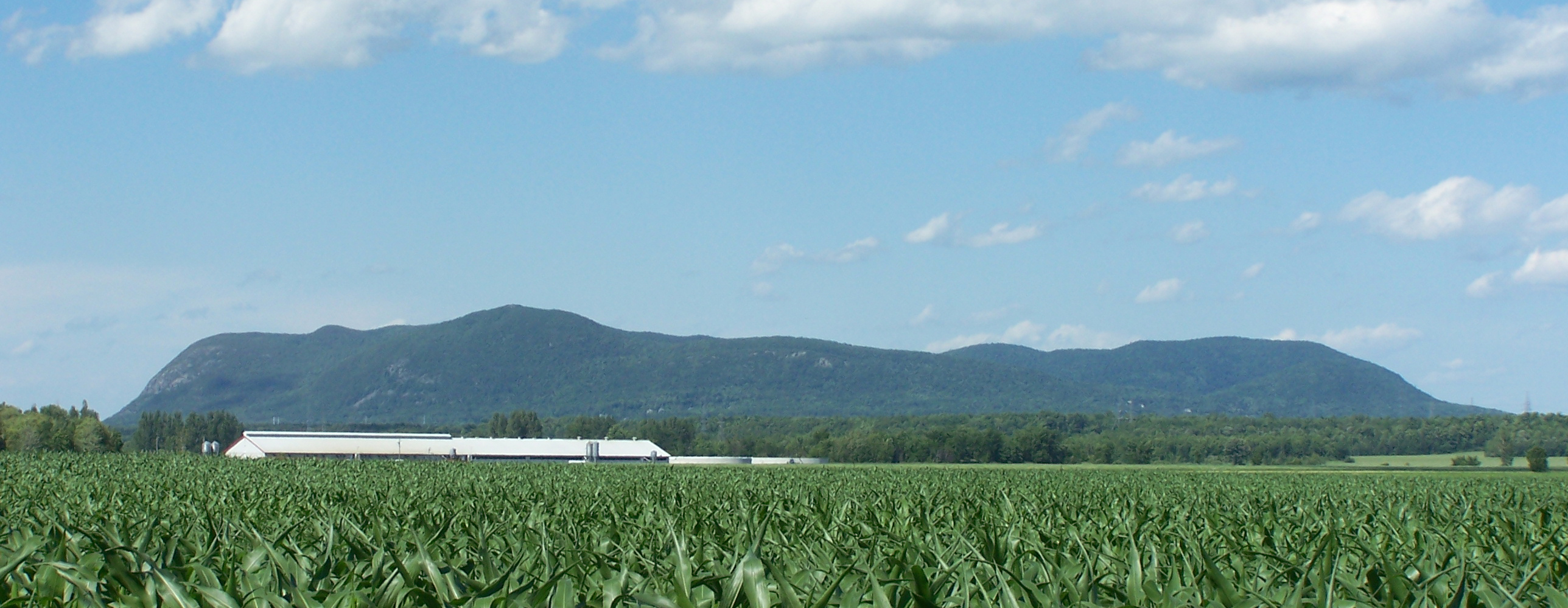
Mont Saint-Hilaire from the south

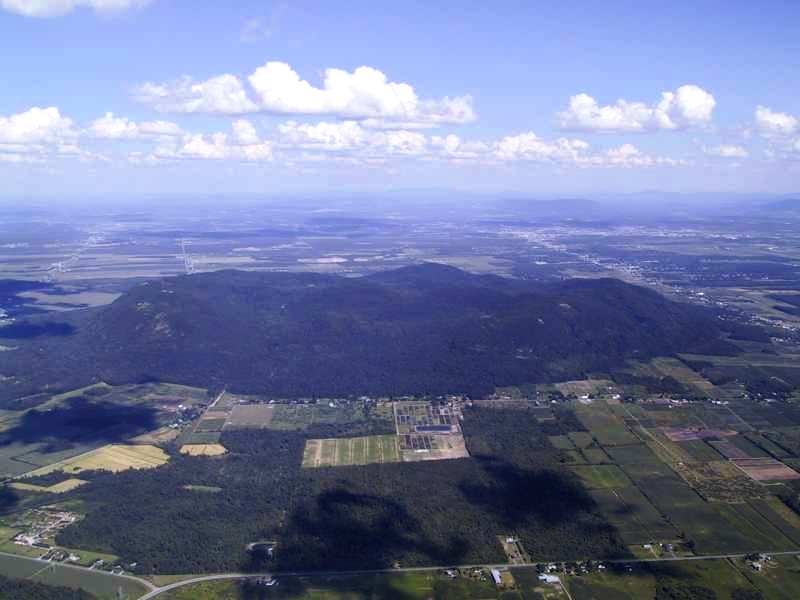
Aerial view of Mont Yamaska

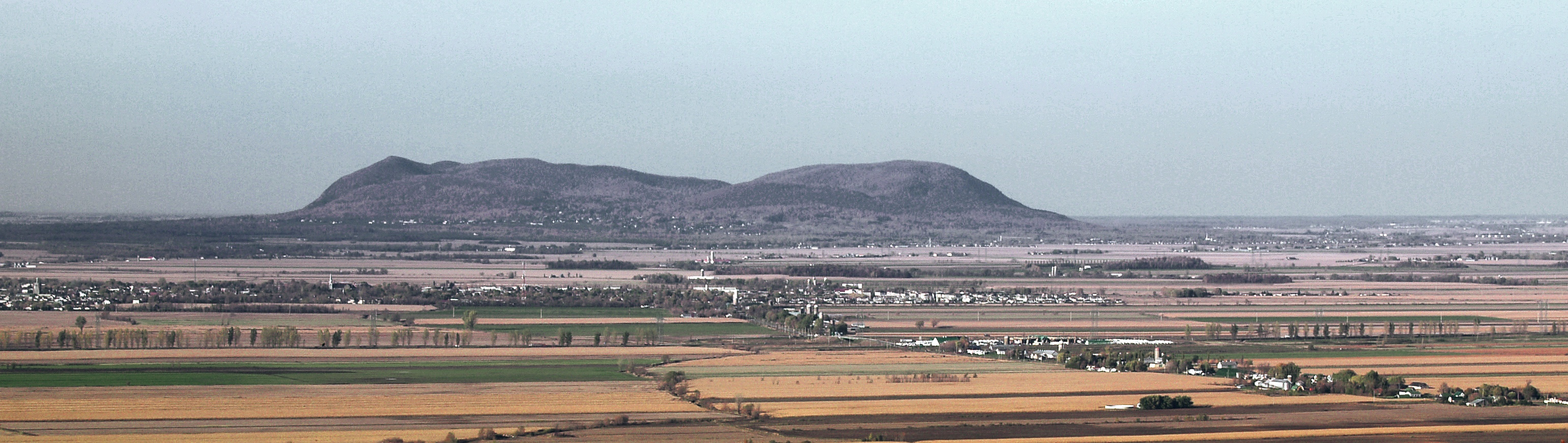
Mont Rougemont as seen from Mt. Saint-Grégoire

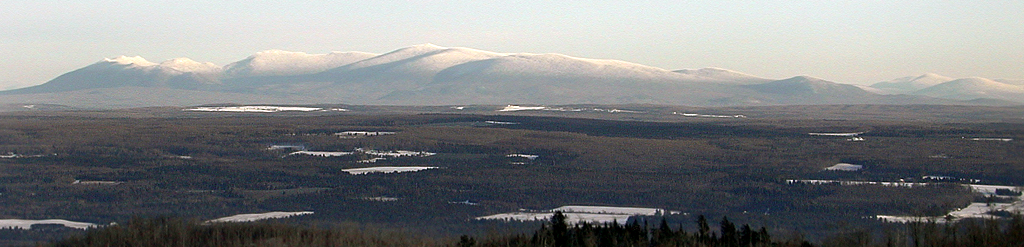
Mont Mégantic as seen from the Stoke Mountains

== See also ==
- Volcanism of Canada
- Volcanism of Eastern Canada
