= Mont Rougemont =

Mountain in Quebec, Canada

Mont Rougemont Wigwômedenek
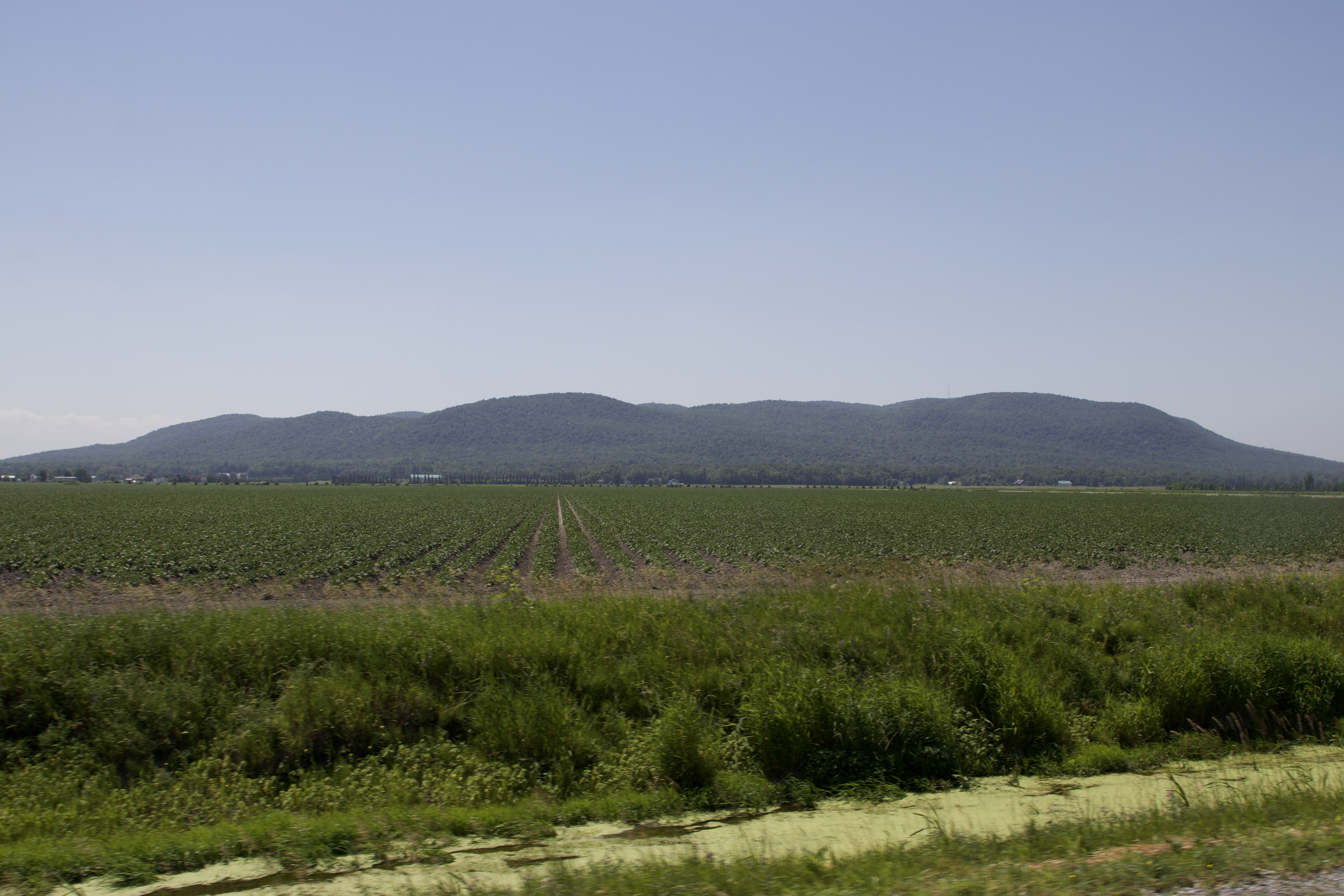
- Mont Rougemont seen from Saint-Jean-Baptiste

Highest point
- Elevation: 390 m (1,280 ft)
- Coordinates: 45°28′36″N 73°03′17″W

Geography
- Location: Rougemont, 18 kilometres southwest of Saint-Hyacinthe, Quebec, Canada
- Parent range: Monteregian Hills
- Topo map: NTS 31H6 Saint-Jean-sur-Richelieu

Geology
- Rock age: Early Cretaceous
- Mountain type: Intrusive stock

Mont Rougemont (French pronunciation: [mɔ̃ ʁuʒmɔ̃]; Abenaki: Wigwômedenek) is part of the Monteregian Hills in southern Quebec. It is composed of igneous rock and hornfels. The summit stands 366 m (1,201 ft) above sea level. The mountain is mostly covered with sugar maple-dominated forest. Apple orchards and vineyards are cultivated on many of the lower slopes, and much of the fruit is used to make cider.

== Geology ==
The igneous material is composed almost entirely of mafic and ultramafic rock such as gabbro and olivine-bearing clinopyroxenite. These rocks outcrop in some places and are otherwise covered by dark brown stony loam, sandy loam or loamy sand which has been mapped as Montarville series. Mont Rougemont might be the deep extension of a vastly eroded ancient volcanic complex, which was probably active about 125 million years ago. The mountain was created when the North American Plate moved westward over the New England hotspot, along with the other mountains of the Monteregian Hills. It forms part of the vast Great Meteor hotspot track.
