= Oka Hills =

Hill range in Quebec, Canada

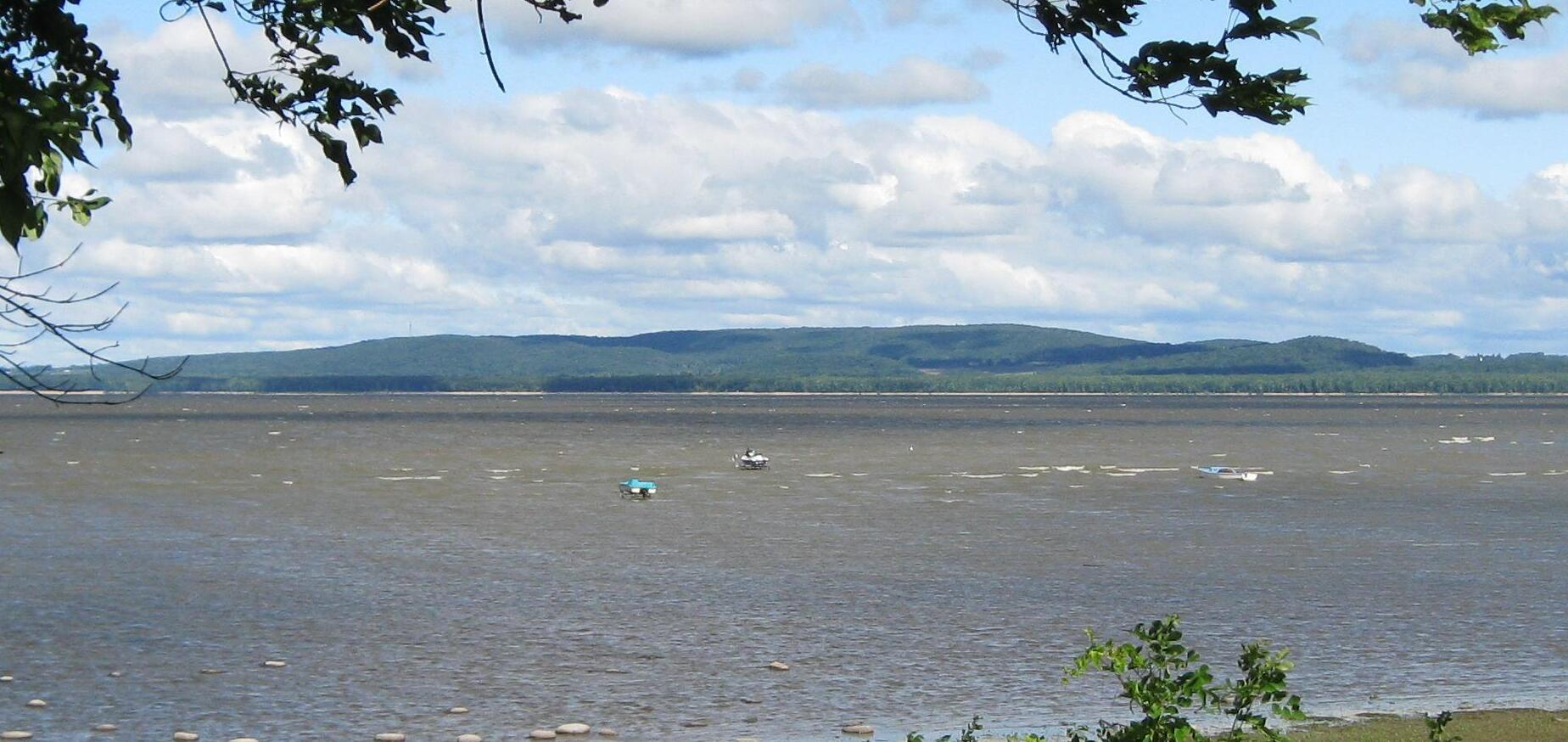
- View of the Oka Hills from across the Lake of Two Mountains.

Highest point
- Elevation: 249 m (817 ft)
- Coordinates: 45°30′53″N 74°06′52″W

Geography
- Location within Southern Quebec
- Location: Deux-Montagnes Regional County Municipality, Quebec, Canada
- Parent range: Monteregian Hills
- Topo map: NTS 31G9 Lachute

Geology
- Rock age(s): Precambrian and Early Cretaceous

The Oka Hills (aka Collines d'Oka) are part of the Monteregian Hills in southern Quebec. The range covers 40 square kilometers and overlook the Lake of Two Mountains and the Ottawa River from the north. Their highest point, known as Mont Bleu stands at 249 m (817 ft) above sea level. Within the rolling landscape, individual hills are identified by eight distinct peaks. Several hills do not have official names, and are referred to in multiple ways.

The hills are scattered through the towns of Oka and Saint-Joseph-du-Lac, as well as Oka National Park, and the Mohawk settlement of Kanesatake. They feature popular hiking trails, particularly those found within the park, and some contain residences and farmland.

== Geography ==
Oka Hills
Hills with elevation:
1 Mont Bleu - 249m
2 Montagne Jumelle - 227m
3 Montagne du Radar - 190m
4 Colline du Calvaire - 150m
5 Butte du Sacré-Coeur - 122m
6 Colline Masson - 80m
7 Colline de la Grande Baie - 80m
8 Colline de l'Est - 60m

=== Mont Bleu ===
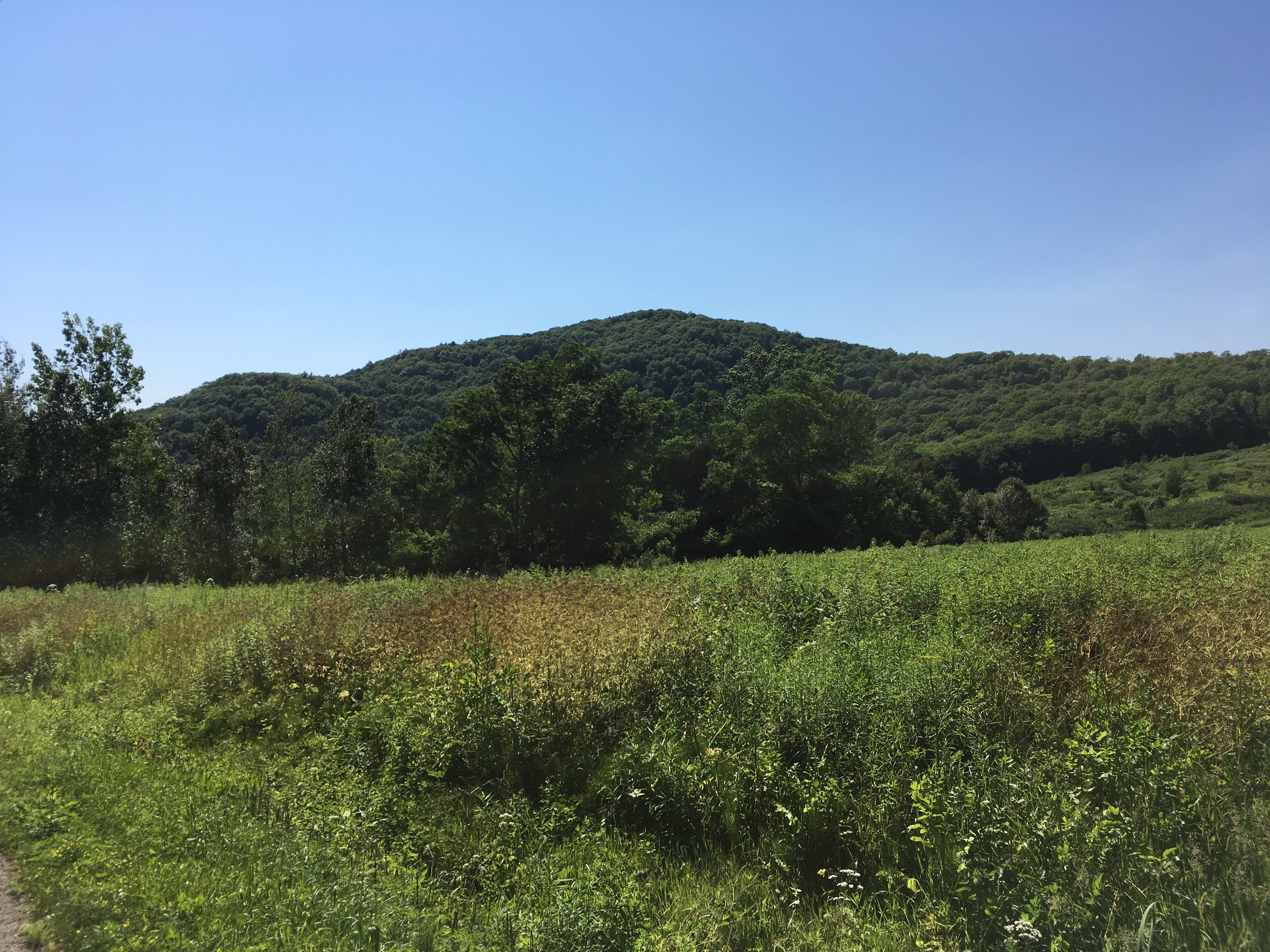
Mont Bleu

The tallest of the Oka Hills, Mont Bleu (also known as Tiononteko:wa) is also the most remote. Situated almost entirely on Kanesatake Lands, the mountain is densely forested without human settlement.

=== Colline du Calvaire ===
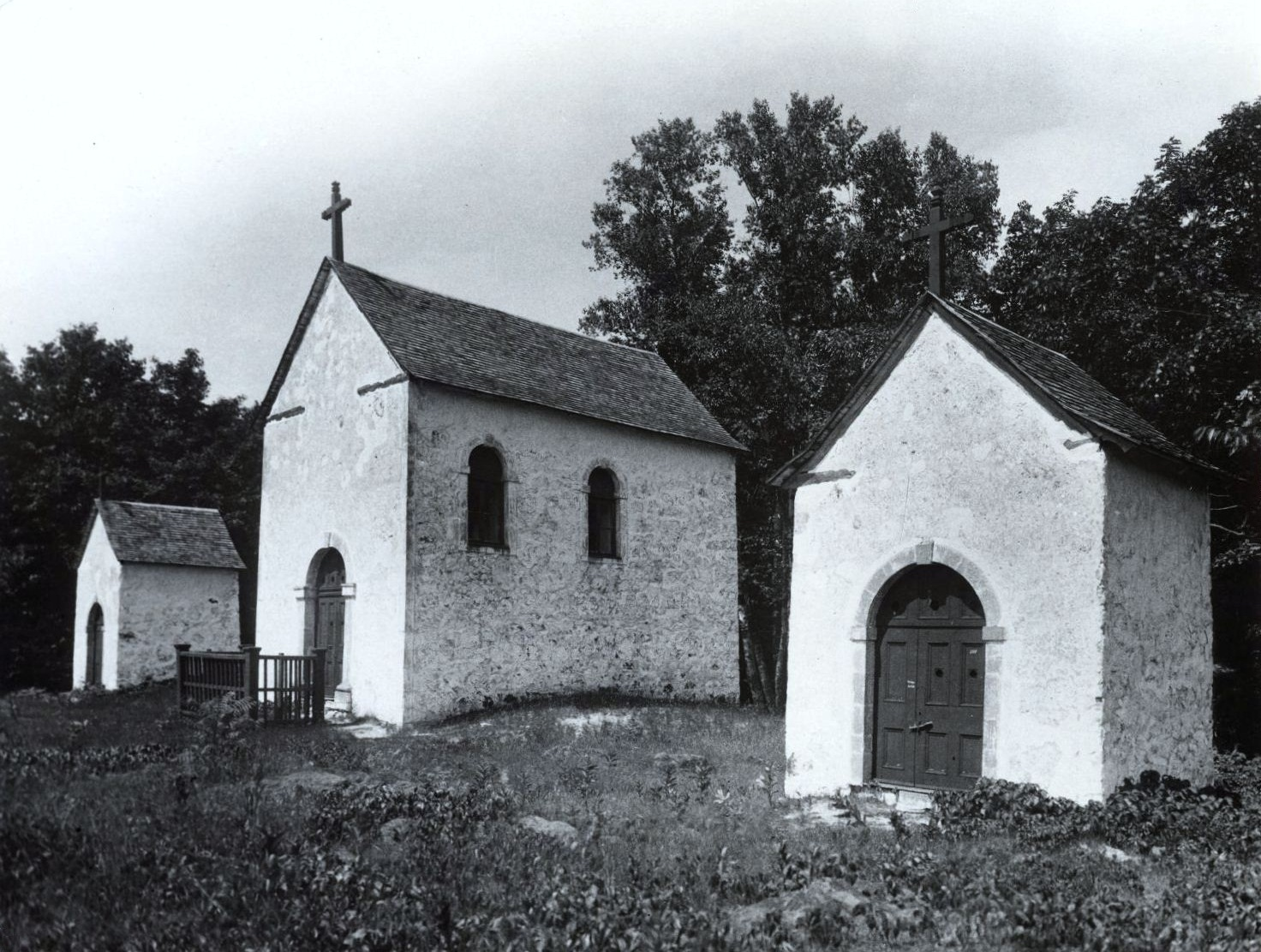
Chapels at the summet of Colline de Calvaire, 1925

Perhaps the most known hill is the Colline du Calvaire, upon which Sulpician missionaries erected a series of chapels in 1740 to serve as a way of the cross pilgrimage. The structures were restored in 1978.

The Calvaire d'Oka trail is popular with hikers in the Montreal area. The view from the summit looks across the Lake of Two Mountains towards the Monteregie and the Adirondacks with a good view of Lyon Mountain.

== Geology ==
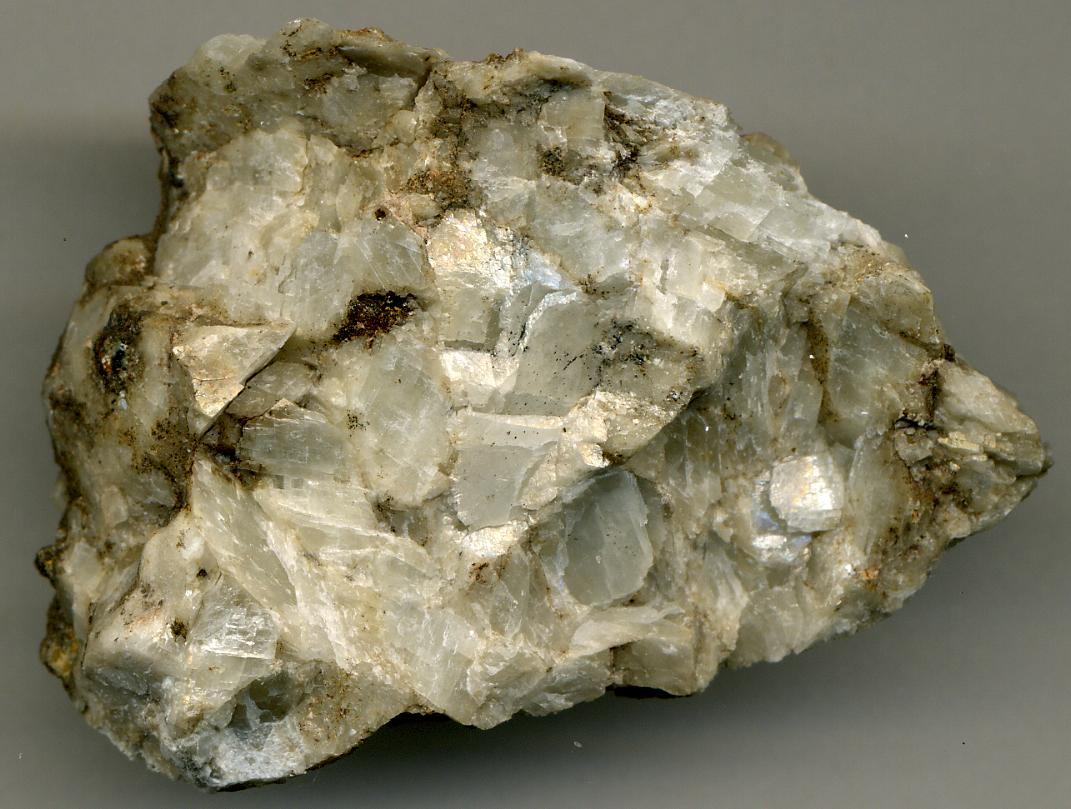
Oka Carbonatite

The Oka Hills are a mixture of both Precambrian and Early Cretaceous formations. Unlike the classic Monteregian Hills, which are stark, isolated mountains composed of intrusive igneous rock that became exposed as the softer sedimentary rock around it eroded, the intrusion in the Oka Hills occurred in harder basement rock (principally Grenville gneiss). As a result, the Oka Hills have a less dramatic profile. In fact, the highest peaks are Precambrian while the intrusive rock resides principally in the valleys.

Among the alkaline igneous rock found within the hills are the rare Carbonatite, a key source of Niobium.

The Oka Hills might be the deep extension of a vastly eroded ancient volcanic complex, which was probably active about 125 million years ago. The hills was created when the North American Plate moved westward over the New England hotspot, along with other mountains of the Monteregian Hills that form part of the vast Great Meteor hotspot track.

== See also ==
- Volcanism of Canada
- Monteregian Hills
