= Mont Brome =

Mountain in Quebec, Canada

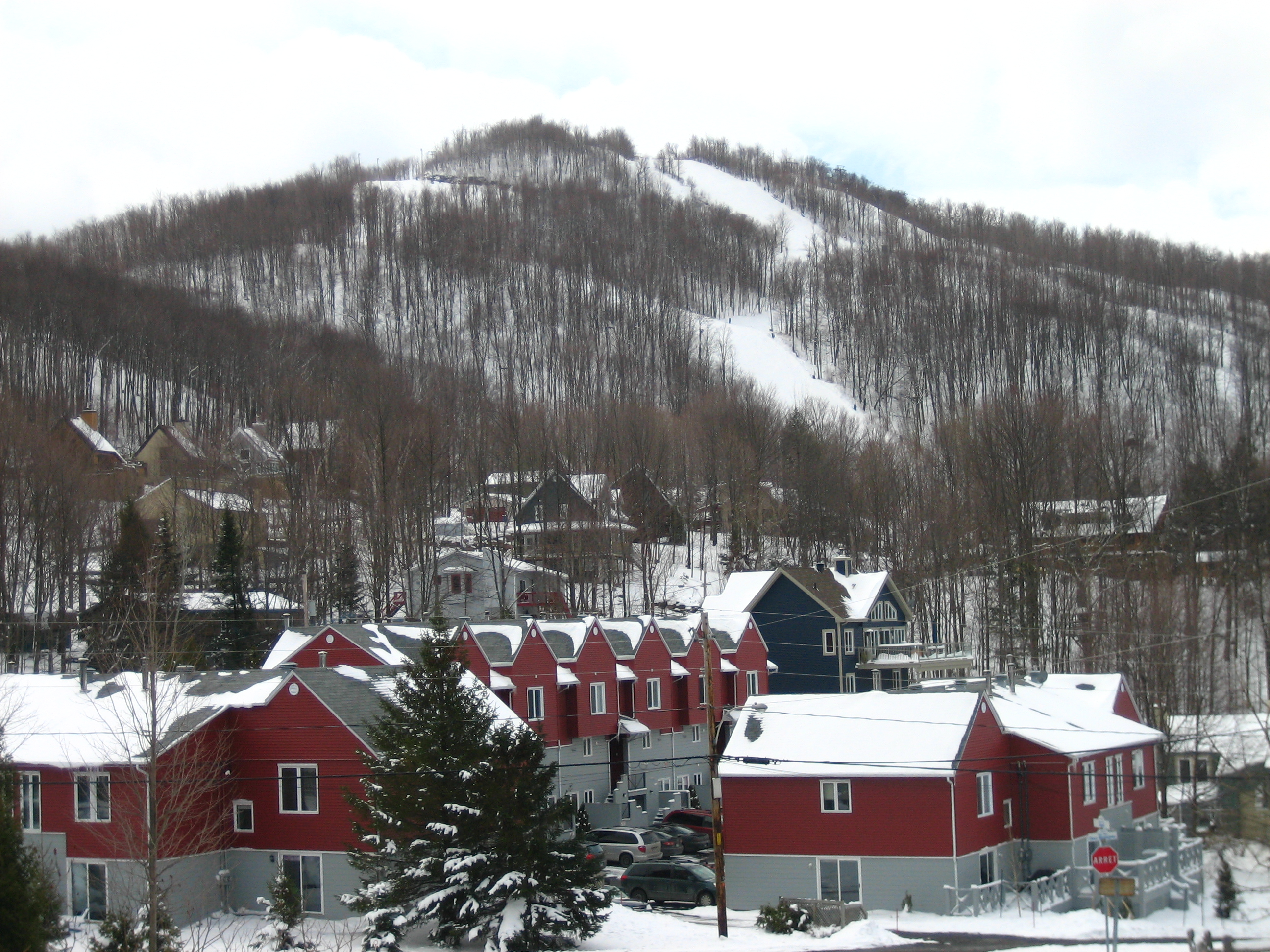

Highest point
- Elevation: 553 m (1,814 ft)
- Listing: Mountains of Canada
- Coordinates: 45°17′21″N 72°38′16″W

Geography
- Location within Southern Quebec
- Location: Bromont, Quebec, Canada
- Parent range: Monteregian Hills
- Topo map: NTS 31H7 Granby

Geology
- Rock age: Early Cretaceous
- Mountain type: Intrusive stock

Mont Brome (aka Bromont, Bromount, Mount Brome) is part of the Monteregian Hills in southern Quebec. Its summit stands 553 m (1,814 ft) above sea level. It is near the town of Bromont, Quebec. The ski resort Ski Bromont lies on its slopes.

== Geology ==
Mont Brome might be the deep extension of a vastly eroded ancient volcanic complex, which was probably active about 125 million years ago. The mountain was created when the North American Plate moved westward over the New England hotspot, along with other mountains of the Monteregian Hills that form part of the vast Great Meteor hotspot track.

== See also ==
- Volcanism of Canada
- Monteregian Hills
