= Grenville dike swarm =

Large geological structure in Canada

The Grenville dike swarm is a large Proterozoic dike swarm in the Canadian provinces of Ontario and Quebec. It is one of the several major magmatic events in the Canadian Shield and it possibly formed 590 million years ago along a triple junction that might have been related to a mantle plume. The maximum length of the Grenville dike swarm is 700 km (435 mi).

The Ottawa-Bonnechere Graben is associated with the Grenville dike swarm, as some of its features date from that time.

== See also ==
- Volcanism of Canada
- Volcanism of Eastern Canada
- Grenville orogeny
