= Mont Saint-Hilaire =

Mountain in Montérégie, Quebec, Canada

Mont Saint-Hilaire Wigwômaden, Wigwômadenek, Wigwômadensisek (Western Abnaki)
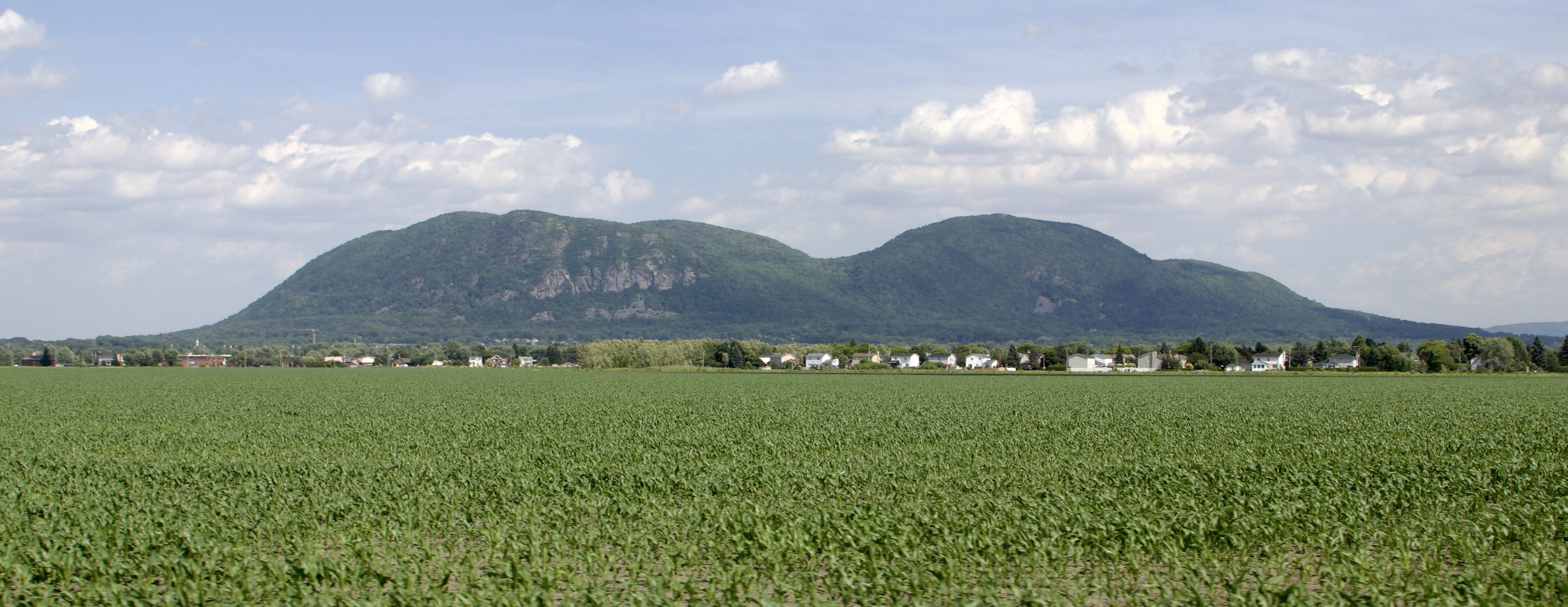
- Mont Saint-Hilaire seen from Beloeil

Highest point
- Elevation: 414 m (1,358 ft)
- Prominence: 380 m (1,250 ft)
- Isolation: 26.4 km (16.4 mi)
- Coordinates: 45°33′8″N 73°9′3″W

Geography
- Location: Mont-Saint-Hilaire, Quebec, Canada
- Parent range: Monteregian Hills
- Topo map: NTS 31H11 Beloeil

Geology
- Rock age: Early Cretaceous
- Mountain type: Intrusive stock

Mont Saint-Hilaire (French pronunciation: [mɔ̃ sɛ̃t‿ilɛʁ]; English: Mount Saint-Hilaire; Western Abnaki: Wigwômadenek, Wigwômadensizek;, Western Abnaki: Wigwômaden; see § Names of Mont Saint-Hilaire for other names) is a mountain, 414 m (1,358 ft) high, in the Montérégie region of southern Quebec. It is about thirty kilometres east of Montreal, and immediately east of the Richelieu River. It is one of the Monteregian Hills. Around the mountains are the towns of Mont-Saint-Hilaire and Saint-Jean-Baptiste. Other nearby towns include Otterburn Park, Beloeil and McMasterville.

The area surrounding the mountain is a biosphere reserve, as one of the last remnants of the primeval forests of the Saint-Lawrence valley. Most of the mountain is currently the property of McGill University, as the Gault Nature Reserve, which is considered the third McGill campus. The university has opened the western half of the mountain to visitors (at a fee) for hiking and cross-country skiing, as the Milieu Naturel (natural area). The eastern half, or Milieu de Conservation (preservation area), is not accessible to the general public.

Until the late nineteenth century, the lack of information on more remote summits of Quebec, as well as the relatively high prominence (about 400 m (1,312 ft)) of Mont Saint-Hilaire, led to it being mistaken as the highest summit in Québec. In actuality, Saint-Hilaire's 414 metres falls far short of making it the highest mountain in Quebec.

Mont Saint-Hilaire is home to a wide variety of fauna and flora, as well as a number of rare minerals, including some which were discovered on the mountain and some which are unique to the region. These minerals are exploited by a quarry on the north-eastern side of the mountain. Some of the soils are ideal for the growth of apple trees, and the mountain's apple orchards draws tens of thousands of visitors each year.

== Geography ==
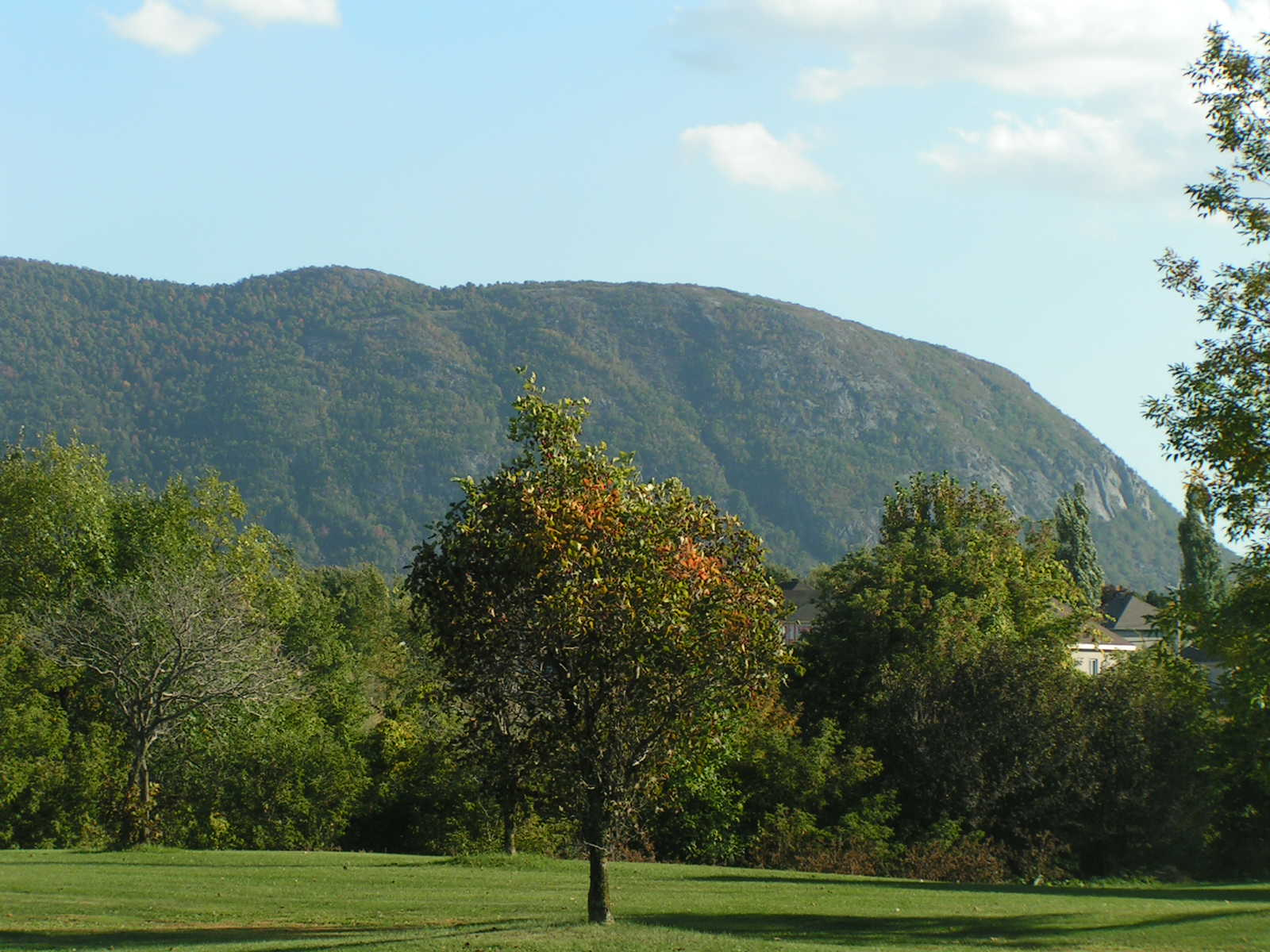
The western part of the mountain, seen from the North

The mountain stands 414 m (1,358 ft) above the sea level, or 400 metres above the surrounding plains. It has several summits, surrounding a central lake, Lac Hertel (Lake Hertel).

Most of the well-known summits of the mountain are in the western (open to the public) part. They are the Pain de Sucre (Sugar Loaf), 414 m (1,358 ft) high; the Sunrise, 405 m (1,329 ft) high; the Rocky, 403 m (1,322 ft) high; and the Sommet Dieppe (Dieppe Summit), 371 m (1,217 ft) high as well as Burnt Hill, 320 m (1,050 ft) high.

The summits of the eastern half of the mountain, which is closed to the public, are generally little known, to the point that most official maps fail to identify the distinct summits at all. Only a few names are known, such as East Hill and Lake Hill. These summits range from 277 to 392 metres (909 to 1,286 ft) in elevation.

=== Cliffs ===
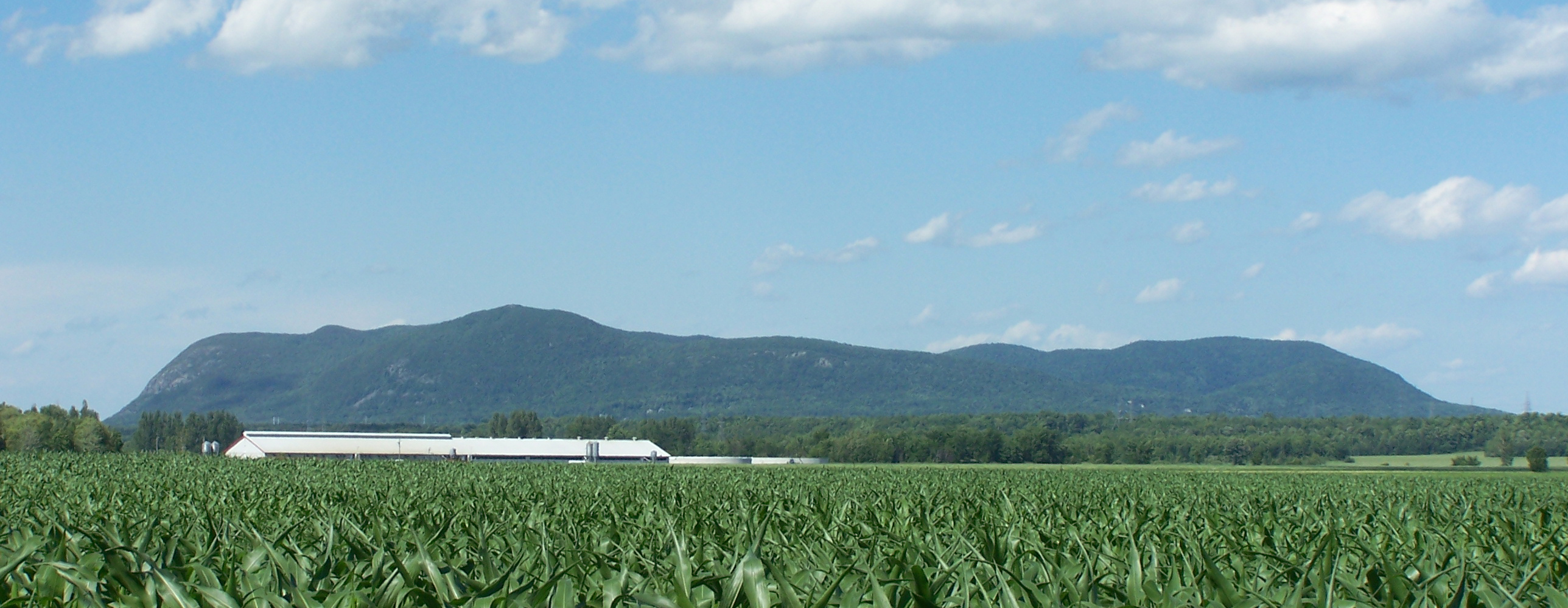
Mont Saint-Hilaire seen from the south. The Dieppe, Rocky and Pain de Sucre summits are visible (in order) to the left.

The best-known feature of the mountain is the cliffs. Collectively known as the falaise dieppe, or falaise de Dieppe (Dieppe cliffs) the cliffs are part of the Dieppe summit, and nearly 175 m (574 ft) high. Some of the best known features of the cliffs include the 60-metre high Tour rouge (Red tower), as well as two slabs, the Dalle noire (Black slab) and Dalle Verte (Green slab), which rise at a 75-degree angle.

The cliff's unique ecosystem hosts lichens, as well as cedar trees, some of which may be as much as five hundred years old. It also hosts the mountain's population of peregrine falcons. However, the action of rock climbers has proven destructive to the ecosystem, in addition to being dangerous to the climbers themselves. A white cross on the cliff commemorates the death of a boy scout in 1941.

=== Lac Hertel ===
At the centre of the mountain is Lac Hertel, a lake in a glacially-formed depression in the middle of the various summits. It covers an area of 0.3 square kilometres (0.12 mi^{2}), and has a maximum depth of 9 m (30 ft). It is fed by three permanent streams; a fourth flows from the lake toward the Richelieu River. The lake serves as a secondary reservoir of drinking water to the region, and, as such, swimming, fishing and boating are forbidden.

The central position of the lake on the mountain has led to claims that Mont Saint-Hilaire is a volcanic caldera. However, the lake is actually the result of glacial erosion, and in no way an ancient volcanic crater.

== Geology ==
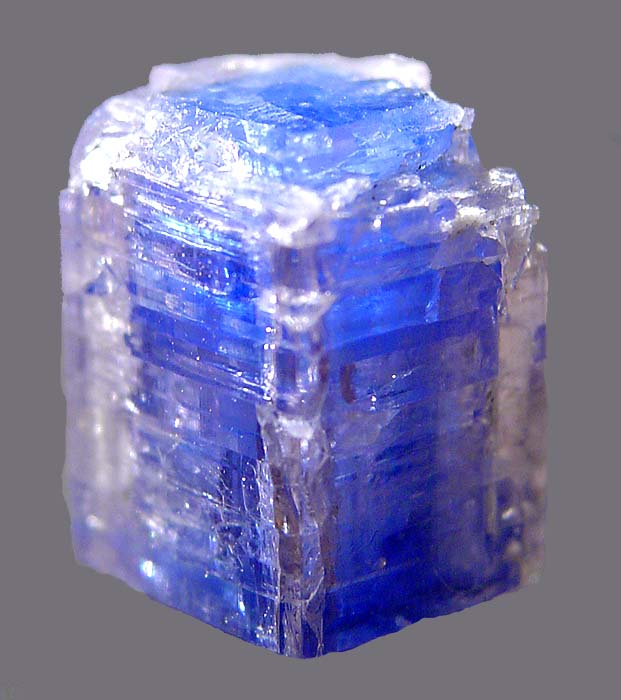
Carletonite crystal from Poudrette Quarry, Mont Saint-Hilaire, its type locality

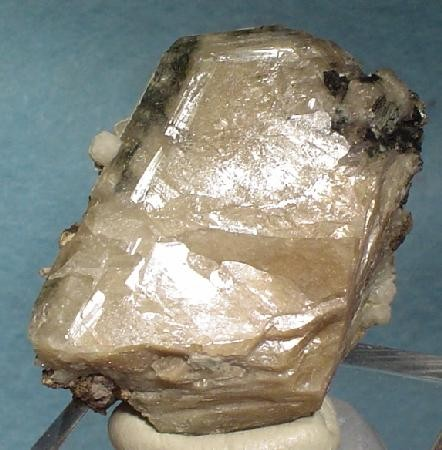
Catapleiite-Analcime-Aegirine

Mont Saint-Hilaire is one of the Monteregian Hills, a group of erosional remnants of intrusive mountains spread across southern Quebec. It is composed of three distinct plutonic intrusions that formed during the Cretaceous Period between 133 and 120 million years ago. Like the other Monteregian Hills, Mont Saint-Hilaire forms part of the Great Meteor hotspot track, which was created when the North American Plate slid over the New England hotspot. During this time, melting occurred, creating subsurface magma intrusions. Erosion of the surrounding softer sedimentary rocks revealed the more resistant rocks of Mont Saint-Hilaire.

=== Mineral wealth ===
Hackmanite in matrix from Mont Saint-Hilaire, Quebec

Mont Saint-Hilaire is a famous mineral locality because of its great number of rare and exotic mineral species. Annite (iron rich biotite) from Mont Saint-Hilaire is among the most iron-rich found in nature. In the gabbro, biotite is less iron-rich, has lower manganese content, but is titanium-rich. Phlogopite is found as small metamorphic crystals in marble xenoliths within the syenite. Siderophyllite, a relatively rare mineral, occurs as large crystals in a metasomatised albite-rich albitite dike.

In addition to gabbro, the second intrusive suite included nepheline syenite, diorite and monzonite. The third intrusive occupies the eastern side and is mainly peralkaline nepheline syenites and porphyrites. The most mineralogically interesting are the associated agpaitic (alkali rich, low aluminium and silicon) pegmatites, the intrusive breccias, and the hornfels derived from the metasomatised sedimentary wall rocks. There have been over 366 distinct species of minerals collected at Mont Saint-Hilaire, 50 of which have this site as type locality.

== Ecology ==
As the last remnant in Quebec of the ancient Gulf of St. Lawrence lowland forests, the area has been a provincial biosphere reserve since 1978 and a federal Migratory Bird Sanctuary since 1960. The area hosts 21 at risk and two endangered species of plant under current statutes.

== History ==
The mountain, particularly the Pain-de-Sucre summit, was well known by the Algonquin First Nations, who used it as a vantage point to survey the valley of the Richelieu River below. The mountain is located in Abenaki traditional territory and its name, Wigwômadenizibo, which means little house-shaped mountain. The first European to visit the region was Samuel de Champlain, who explored the Richelieu River in two expeditions in 1603 and 1609. It was during the later expedition that he discovered the mountain.

=== Development of the region ===
Settlement around the mountain began in 1694 when a seigneury was granted to Jean-Baptiste Hertel de Rouville. A village slowly grew on the slopes of the mountain, near the streams emptying out of Lake Hertel. The combination of sugar bushes, the orchards alongside the mountain slopes, and the stream flowing from Lake Hertel which facilitated the construction of watermills provided for growth of the village in the eighteenth and early nineteenth centuries.

In the nineteenth century, the mountain became a tourist destination, particularly after Tomas Edmond Campbell bought the seigneury from the Hertel de Rouville family in 1844. A café, the Campbell Café, was established in 1851, and in 1874, a 150-room hotel, the Iroquois Hotel. Both burned down, the café in 1861 and the hotel in 1895. The tourist value of the mountain dwindled as development of the Eastern Townships made the northern Appalachians more accessible.

=== The Gault Reserve ===
Campbell sold the mountain in 1913 to Andrew Hamilton Gault. While he saw to the development of the region, Gault also insisted on protecting the wild nature of Mont Saint-Hilaire, where he planned to build a mansion home for his retirement. Construction of the mansion began in 1957, but Gault lived there a mere three weeks before he died. He bequeathed the property to McGill University, where he had received his education, which made it into the "Gault Reserve".

The natural value of the mountain led to its being proclaimed a migratory bird sanctuary in 1960. In 1970, the mountain was divided into a preservation area, closed to the public, and an area open to the public, which became the responsibility of the Centre de Conservation de la Nature (Nature Conservation Centre) in 1972. In 1978, the mountain was made the first world biosphere reserve of Canada as a result of it being the last remnants of the primeval forests of the Saint-Lawrence Valley.

Although initial documents indicate the biosphere reserve covered large areas surrounding the mountains, it appears that today, the effective definition of the biosphere reserve corresponds to that of the Gault Reserve.

== Names ==
In the modern Abenaki language, Mont Saint-Hilaire is known as Wigwômadenizibo, meaning the small house-shaped mountain. The neighbouring Mount Yamaska is similarly referred to in Abenaki as Wigwômadenek (Wigwam-shaped mountain), without the diminutive suffix. The mountain was formerly rendered by Europeans as Wigwomadensis (Wigwam-shaped mountain).

When Samuel de Champlain visited the mountain, he named it Mont Fort (which can be interpreted as "Fort Mountain" or "Mount Strong").

The establishment of the town and parish of Chambly to the south led to the mountain temporarily becoming Mont Chambly in the later seventeenth century (although the name persisted in English until at least 1830). After 1697, the mountain became known as Mont Rouville, after the newly established seigneury of the Hertel de Rouville family.

When the Campbell family replaced the Hertel de Rouville family, the mountain took up the name Mont Beloeil, after the nearby municipality of Beloeil, on the other side of the Richelieu River. However, the name Mont Saint-Hilaire, after the parish of Mont-Saint-Hilaire established at the foot of the mountain, became prevalent by the early twentieth century. Even so, quarrels between inhabitants of Beloeil and Mont-Saint-Hilaire, both near the mountain, as to which the mountain should be named after lasted well into the twentieth century, with the town newspapers of Beloeil attempting to resurrect the debate as late as 1986.

== In culture ==
Mont Saint-Hilaire, owing to its stark form, has always played a significant part in the culture of the nearby region. It is an important regional icon, its silhouette appearing in the symbols of many towns and cities of the region, such as Beloeil, McMasterville, Mont-Saint-Hilaire and Otterburn Park.

=== In art ===
Several artists have painted Mont Saint-Hilaire over the years. The first was the English painter John Bainbrigge, who made three separate watercolour paintings of the mountains around 1838, while garrisoned in the region. A few decades later, the mountain also appeared in a painting by Cornelius Krieghoff.

However, the famous artists most closely linked with the mountains are the three who were born or lived in Mont-Saint-Hilaire itself over the course of the late nineteenth and twentieth century: Ozias Leduc, born in 1864 in Mont-Saint-Hilaire, his student Paul-Émile Borduas, also born in Mont-Saint-Hilaire in 1905, and finally, Jordi Bonet, who, after emigrating to Québec, settled down at Mont-Saint-Hilaire in 1969. Leduc especially is known for his numerous representations of the mountain in several paintings such as L'Heure Mauve and Neige Dorée, but the mountain also inspired the work of Borduas, such as his Le Trou des Fées and Synthèse d'un paysage de Mont-Saint-Hilaire, and Bonnet, who included the silhouette of the mountain in several of his works.

=== In religion ===
Some evidence suggests that Mont Saint-Hilaire, particularly the Pain de Sucre summit, was a sacred site of the Algonquin natives, who conducted rituals there.

Despite a slow establishment in the region (the first two parishes at the foot of the mountain, Saint-Jean-Baptiste and Saint-Hilaire, were only established in 1796 and 1798), the Catholic Church soon established itself on the mountain. In 1841, a great wooden cross was built atop the mountain, more than 30 metres (98 ft) high and 9 metres (30 ft) across, with a chapel at its base. The cross was hollow, allowing visitors to climb to the top. A winding trail was established leading up to the mountain, with Stations of the Cross along the way. The cross was destroyed in a storm in 1846. It was replaced in 1871 by a stone chapel, which burned in 1876.

=== In legends ===
Oral tradition in the area surrounding Mont Saint-Hilaire has recorded several legends concerning the mountains. Local figures such as the painter Ozias Leduc and local historians Armand Cardinal and Pierre Lambert have set down in writing several of those legends; even so much of the oral tradition is now lost.

Legends of the mountain generally centre on the figures of either the mountain's three fairies, who are said to have lived in a cave in the cliff-face for several centuries before abandoning the mountain and their immortality to marry their mortal lovers, or the devil, and the existence of two passage to hell, including the location known as les Portes de fer (the Iron gates) (two great stone slabs found next to one another on the slopes of the mountain).

Lac Hertel is also at the centre of several legends. According to different legends, it is either bottomless, connected by underground passages to Lake Champlain, or was formed as a direct result of the devil successfully convincing several of the early settlers to abandon their promise to attend mass at the newly established chapel every Sunday.

Another legend, based on the unusual ice patterns found on the northern cliff-face of the mountain, where a vaguely horse-shaped ice formation does not melt until late in the spring, state that the spirit of a local farmer's horse warns farmers against planting their crop so long as the ice formation remains on the mountain.

=== In esotericism ===
Since the late twentieth century, the mountain has become a major hub of alleged supernatural activity. The towns surrounding the mountain have shown the highest number of UFO sightings in Quebec. The Ufologist organisation UFO-Québec has claimed Mont Saint-Hilaire to be the central hub of all UFO observations in southern Quebec. On the night of May 22–23, 1981, several hundred people came to the mountain after Richard Glenn claimed to have been warned of UFO visits to the mountain that night. The observations were severely limited by a rainstorm, although some alleged sightings still took place. Glenn also introduced the concept of the Hollow Earth to the mountain, claiming Mont Saint-Hilaire to be an entrance leading to the domain of the inhabitants of the Hollow Earth.

The abundance of unusual minerals and crystals at Mont Saint-Hilaire, as well as the effect of its mass upon local magnetism, have also been of great interest to followers of the New Age movement and conspiracy theories.

== See also ==
- Mont-Saint-Hilaire, Quebec
