= Siderophyllite =

Mica mineral in the biotite subgroup

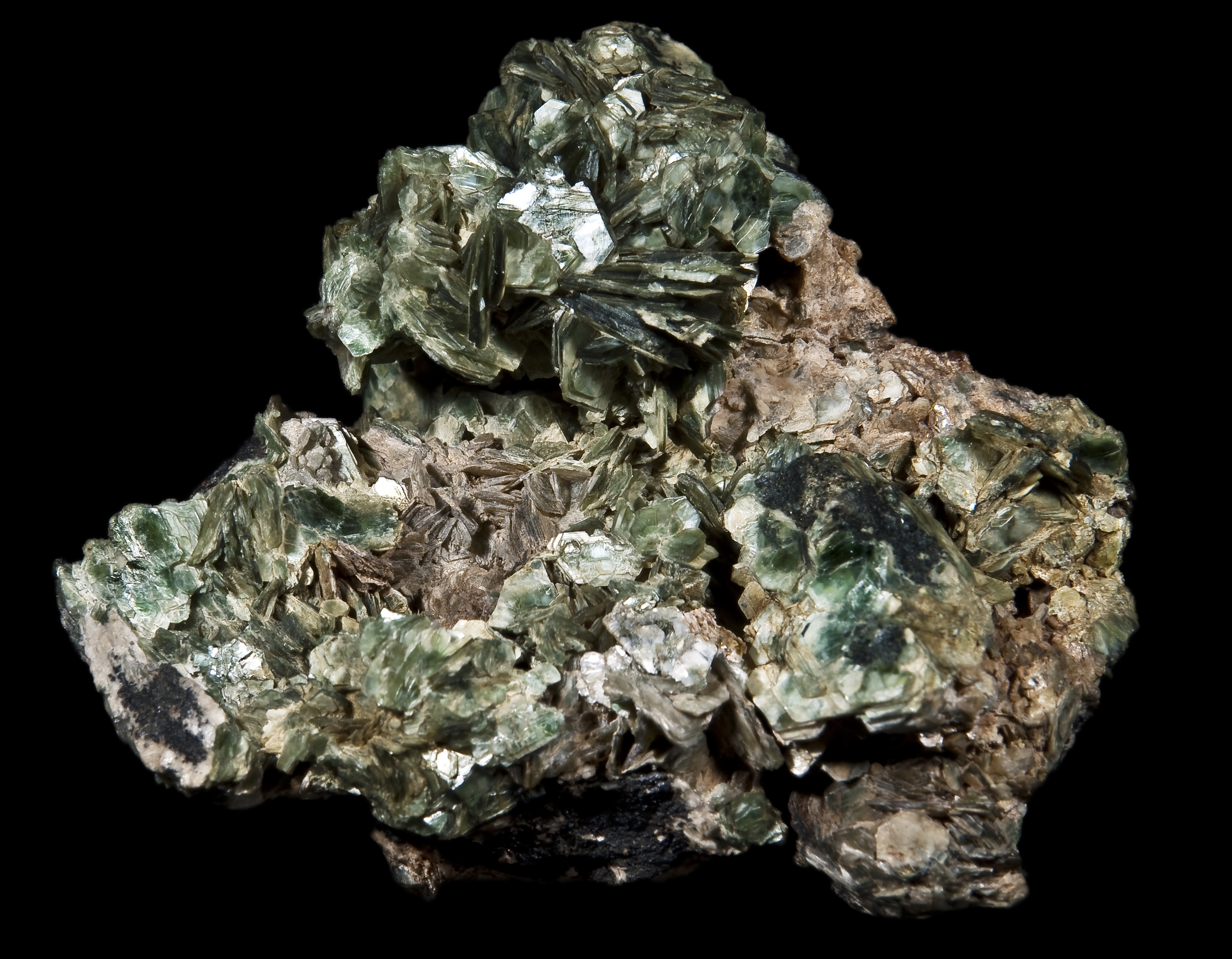
- Zinnwaldite (siderophyllite – polylithionite solid solution mineral series)

General
- Category: Phyllosilicate minerals
- Group: Mica group, trioctahedral mica group, biotite subgroup
- Formula: KFe^{2+}_{2}Al(Al_{2}Si_{2})O_{10}(F,OH)_{2}
- IMA symbol: Sid
- Strunz classification: 9.EC.21
- Crystal system: Monoclinic
- Crystal class: Prismatic (2/m) (same H-M symbol)
- Space group: C2/m
- Unit cell: a = 5.36 Å, b = 9.29 Å c = 10.26 Å; β = 100.1°; Z = 2

Identification
- Color: Blue green, dark brown, black.
- Crystal habit: Micaceous foliated; pseudohexagonal crystals
- Cleavage: Perfect basal
- Fracture: Conchoidal
- Mohs scale hardness: 2.5
- Luster: Vitreous to dull
- Streak: Greenish gray
- Diaphaneity: Transparent to subopaque
- Specific gravity: 3
- Optical properties: Biaxial (-)
- Refractive index: n_{α} = 1.582 n_{β} = 1.625 n_{γ} = 1.625
- Birefringence: δ = 0.043
- 2V angle: 4° (measured)

Siderophyllite is a rare member of the mica group of silicate minerals with formula KFe^{2+}_{2}Al(Al_{2}Si_{2})O_{10}(F,OH)_{2}.

The mineral occurs in nepheline syenite pegmatites and granite and aplite greisens. It is associated with microcline and astrophyllite at Pikes Peak, Colorado. It is also found in the alkali pegmatites of Mont Saint-Hilaire, Quebec.

It was first described in 1880 for an occurrence near Pikes Peak, Colorado. The name derives from the Greek sideros, iron, and phyllon, leaf, in reference to its iron rich composition and perfect basal cleavage.
