= Rougemont, Quebec =

Rougemont
- Municipality
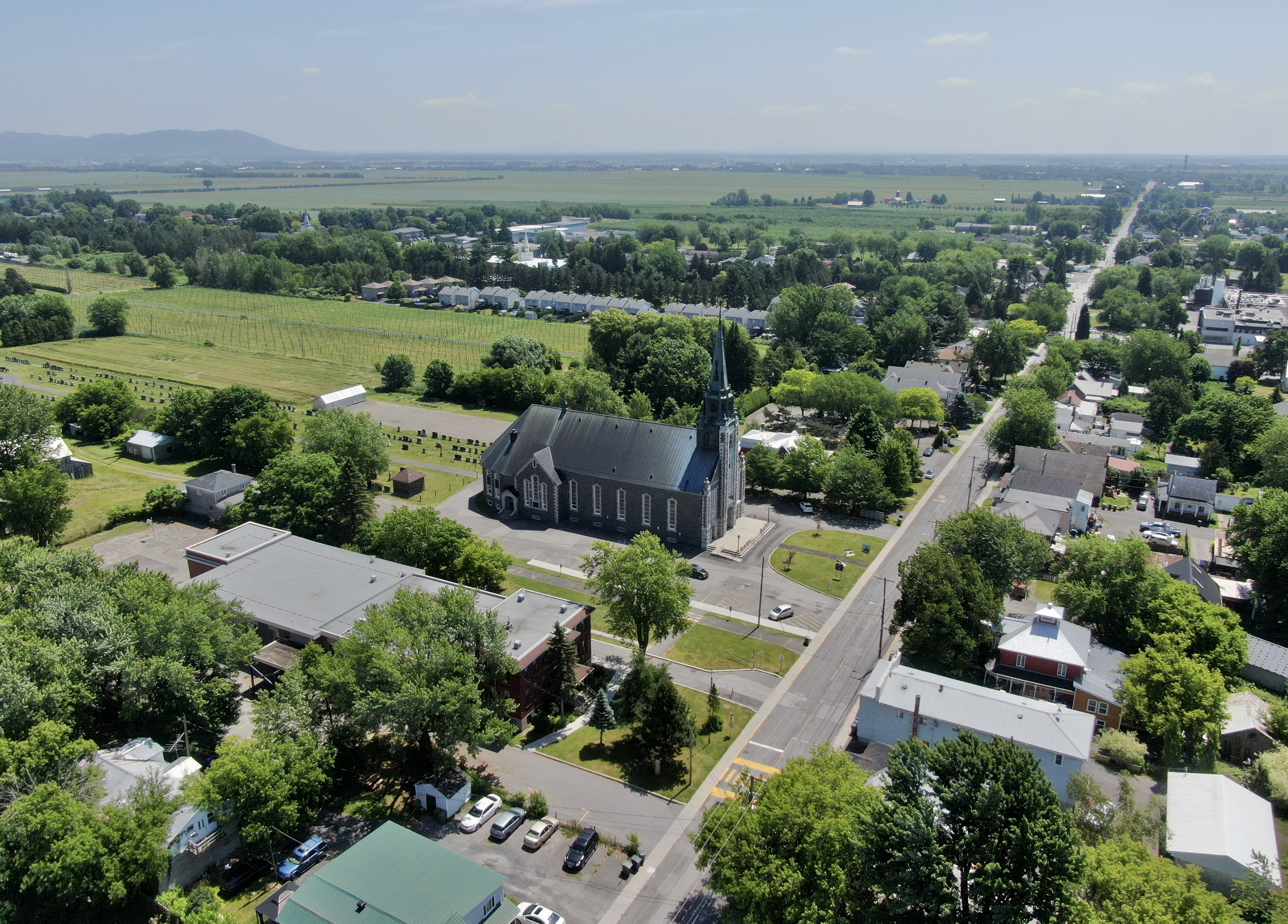
- Downtown Rougemont, Quebec

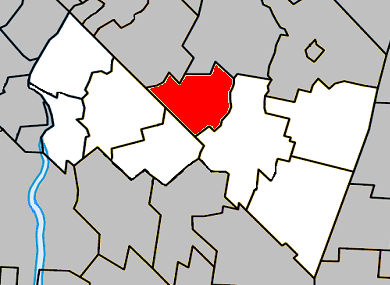
- Location within Rouville RCM

- Location in southern Quebec
- Coordinates: 45°26′N 73°03′W
- Country: Canada
- Province: Quebec
- Region: Montérégie
- RCM: Rouville
- Constituted: January 26, 2000

Government
  - Mayor: Guy Adam
  - Federal riding: Shefford
  - Prov. riding: Iberville

Area
  - Municipality: 44.50 km^{2} (17.18 sq mi)
  - Land: 43.91 km^{2} (16.95 sq mi)
  - Urban: 3.33 km^{2} (1.29 sq mi)

Population (2021)
  - Municipality: 2,696
  - Density: 61.4/km^{2} (159/sq mi)
  - Urban: 1,668
  - Urban density: 500.4/km^{2} (1,296/sq mi)
  - Pop 2016-2021: ▼2.1%
  - Dwellings: 1,149
- Time zone: UTC−5 (EST)
  - Summer (DST): UTC−4 (EDT)
- Postal code(s): J0L 1M0
- Area codes: 450 and 579
- Highways: R-112; R-229; R-231
- Website: www.rougemont.ca

Rougemont (French pronunciation: [ʁuʒmɔ̃]) is a municipality in the Canadian province of Quebec, located within the Rouville Regional County Municipality in the Montérégie region about 18 kilometers southwest of Saint-Hyacinthe. The population as of the Canada 2021 Census was 2,696.

While it is known for its apple orchards and sugar shacks, Rougemont is also the location of Mont Rougemont and Rougemont Airport.

== History ==
Rougemont was created in 2000 from the merger of the village of Rougemont and the parish of Saint-Michel-de-Rougemont.

== Demographics ==
=== Population ===
Population trend:

Census	Population	Change (%)
2021	2,696	▼2.1%
2016	2,755	▲1.2%
2011	2,723	▲3.9%
2006	2,622	▲1.5%
2001	2,583	N/A

=== Language ===
Mother tongue language (2021)

Language	Population	Pct (%)
French only	2,505	92.8%
English only	80	3.0%
Both English and French	25	0.9%
Other languages	75	2.8%

== Education ==
The South Shore Protestant Regional School Board previously served the municipality.

== See also ==
- List of municipalities in Quebec
- 21st-century municipal history of Quebec
