= Clinopyroxenite =

Clinopyroxene rich end member of pyroxenite

- Igneous rock
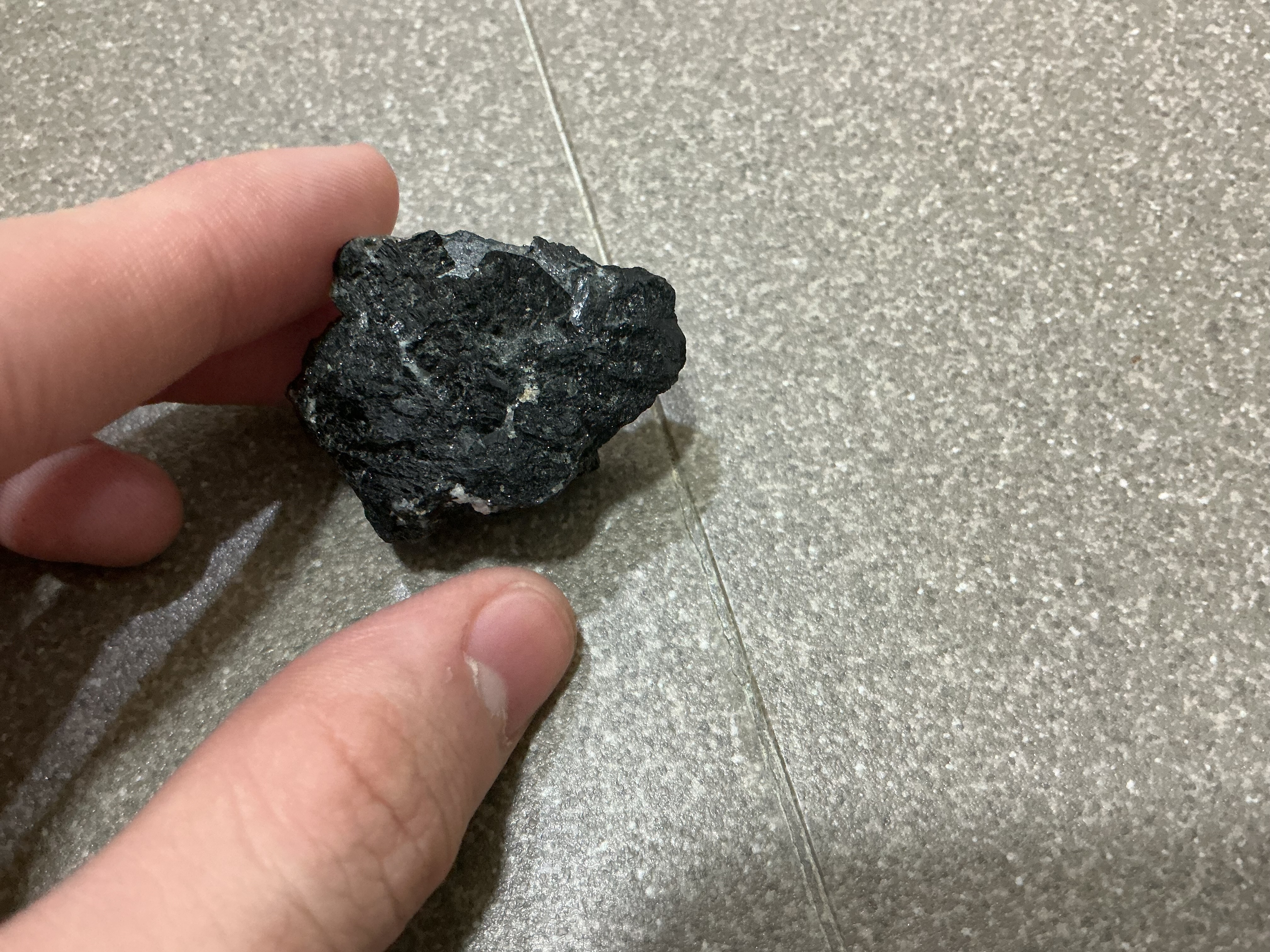
- Augite rich clinopyroxenite from an unknown locality

Composition
- Classification: Ultramafic
- Primary: clinopyroxene
- Secondary: olivine, orthopyroxene, hornblende, spinel, chromite, garnet, anorthite
- Texture: Phaneritic

Clinopyroxenite is a coarse-grained ultramafic rock belonging to the pyroxenite family, consisting predominantly (greater than 90%) of clinopyroxene such as augite, diopside, or hedenbergite.

== Composition and characteristics ==
Clinopyroxenites are dark green to black plutonic rocks. Mineralogically, they contain less than 10% of secondary or accessory minerals, which may include olivine, orthopyroxene, hornblende, or opaque oxides like magnetite. They typically form as cumulate rocks in layered mafic-ultramafic intrusions or as high-pressure crystal segregates within the Earth's upper mantle.

== Occurrence ==
These rocks are found globally in ophiolite complexes representing ancient oceanic crust, within major layered mafic intrusions, such as the Bushveld Igneous Complex, and as mantle xenoliths brought to the surface by explosive volcanic activity such as kimberlites or alkali basalts.
