= Essexite =

Igneous rock type

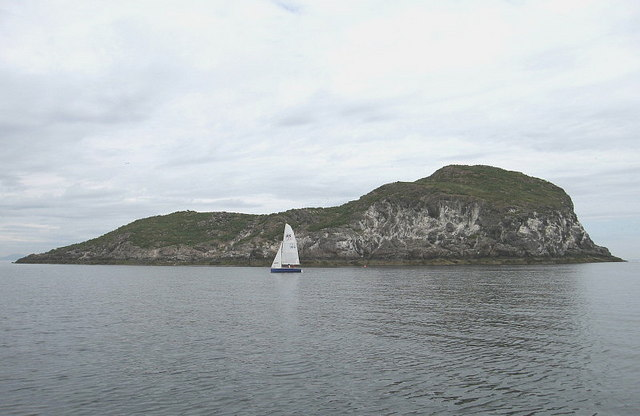
Craigleith, an island in Scotland, composed of essexite

Essexite ( /ˈɛsəkˌsaɪt/), also called nepheline monzogabbro (/ˈnɛfəˌlɪn ˌmɒnzoʊˈɡæbroʊ, -ˌliːn-/), is a dark gray or black holocrystalline plutonic igneous rock. Its name is derived from the type locality in Essex County, Massachusetts, in the United States.

Modern petrology identifies rocks according to mineralogical criteria. Utilising the IUGS QAPF diagram of Streckeisen (1974) "essexite" is more formally known as nepheline monzodiorite or nepheline monzogabbro depending on the ratio of orthoclase to plagioclase and the abundance of nepheline.

== Petrology ==
In order to produce a magma composition suitable for forming essexite the partial melting of the source rocks must be restricted, generally to less than 10% partial melting. This favors producing a melt rich in large-ion lithophile elements (LILE) such as potassium, barium, rubidium, cesium, and strontium.

The source melts of essexites contain more aluminium and alkali ions than available silica tetrahedra, which is why essexites crystallise nepheline instead of plagioclase. Higher than normal potassium favors the production of orthoclase, which is usually absent from most mafic igneous rocks.

== Mineralogy ==
Essexite can be considered as an alkali gabbro or monzodiorite primarily composed of nepheline, plagioclase, with lesser amounts of alkali feldspar, with mafic minerals composed of any of the following; titanium augite (pyroxene), hornblende and biotite.

Trace mineralogy may include magnetite, ilmenite and accessory olivine (<5%).

Essexite grades into a nepheline monzogabbro with a decrease in potassium feldspar and an increase in the feldspathoid minerals.

== Geochemistry ==
Essexite is an alkaline igneous rock equivalent to an alkaline basalt. The presence of nepheline, a feldspathoid mineral, indicates that essexites are silica undersaturated. The presence of orthoclase indicates that it contains sufficient potassium to favor production of orthoclase over microcline or potassic oligoclase.

Essexites are generally rich in aluminium, alkalis (sodium and calcium), potassium (>3% K_{2}O), LILE-enriched (strontium, caesium and barium), as compared to tholeiitic basalts and gabbros.
