= New England hotspot =

Volcanic hotspot in the North Atlantic Ocean

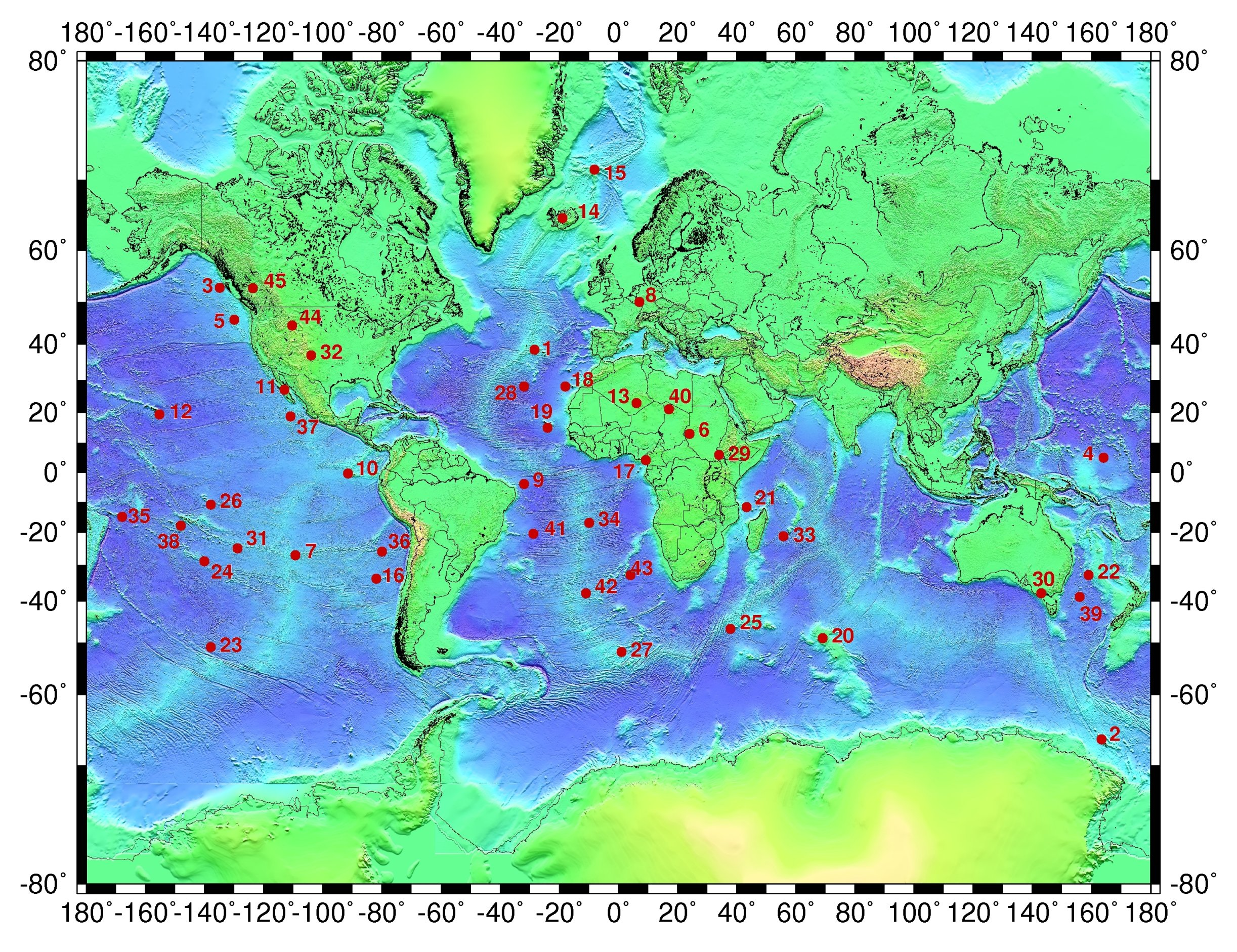
The New England hotspot is marked 28 on this map.

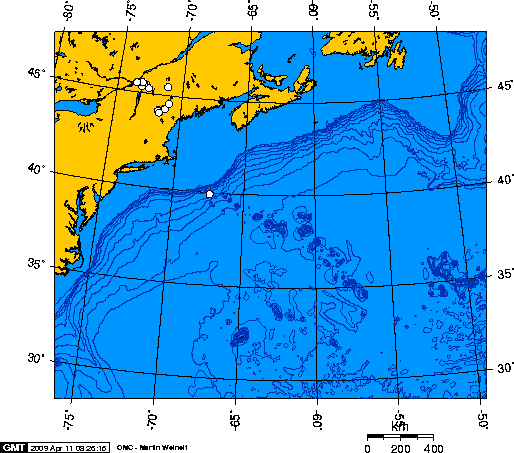
A portion of the track of the New England hotspot. The westernmost white dot is Mont Royal in Montreal. The white dot just off the continental shelf is the Bear seamount.

The New England hotspot, also referred to as the Great Meteor hotspot and sometimes the Monteregian hotspot, is a volcanic hotspot in the North Atlantic Ocean. It created the Monteregian Hills intrusions in Montreal and Montérégie, the White Mountains intrusions in New Hampshire, the New England and Corner Rise seamounts off the coast of North America, and the Seewarte Seamounts east of the Mid-Atlantic Ridge on the African Plate, the latter of which include its most recent eruptive center, the Great Meteor Seamount. The New England, Great Meteor, or Monteregian hotspot track has been used to estimate the movement of the North American Plate away from the African Plate from the early Cretaceous period to the present using the fixed hotspot reference frame.

== Geologic history ==
The geologic history of the New England hotspot is the subject of much debate among geoscientists. The conventional opinion is that volcanic activity associated with the hotspot results from movement of the North American Plate over a fixed mantle plume. During the first major episodes of volcanic activity, the plume created the igneous intrusions of the Monteregian Hills in southern Quebec and the younger set of intrusions of the White Mountains in New Hampshire around 124–100 Ma. As the plate moved further west, the plume moved offshore, forming the New England Seamounts between 103 and 83 Ma. After the formation of the Nashville Seamount around 83 Ma, there was a pause in volcanic activity and the volcanic center shifted north, creating the Corner Rise Seamounts around 80–76 Ma. The Mid-Atlantic Ridge passed over the plume around 76 Ma and renewed volcanic activity produced the Seewarte Seamounts on the African Plate between 26 and 10 Ma.

Evidence for a plume origin includes the above age progression, seismic anomalies in the lower mantle under the Great Meteor Seamount (though these do not extend into the upper mantle as expected for a plume), and helium isotope ratios in groundwater in the Monteregian Hills which indicate a deep mantle source. The lack of an obvious hotspot track west of Montreal has previously been ascribed to failure of the plume to penetrate the Canadian Shield, a lack of recognizable intrusions due to erosion, or strengthening of the plume when it approached the Monteregian Hills, but more recent research has found kimberlite fields in Ontario and New York dated between 180 and 134 Ma and at Rankin Inlet to the northwest of Hudson Bay dated between 214 and 192 Ma which may represent an older, continental extension of the hotspot track.

Some evidence, such the lack of an initial flood basalt and age progression along the New England-Quebec volcanic province, is not what is expected for a plume origin, and the case has been made that a shallow, tectonic mechanism is more plausible. In this view, the two spikes in activity that formed the New England-Quebec volcanic province and New England Seamounts are due to passive, shallow melting associated with lithospheric extension resulting from tectonic changes in the Atlantic Ocean which reactivated pre-existing zones of structural weakness related to the earlier opening of the Iapetus Ocean. The more recent seamounts are thought to mark discrete episodes of volcanic activity along different lines or segments of the same structural trend rather than movement of the plate over a fixed mantle plume. The timing of volcanic activity which coincides with major reorganisations of plate boundaries, as well as geochemical analysis of the Monteregian plutons which indicates a lithospheric mantle source, support this interpretation.

== See also ==
- Volcanism of Northern Canada
- Volcanism of Eastern Canada
- Volcanism of Canada
