= Darrin Canniff =

Mayor of Chatham-Kent

Mayor of Chatham-Kent
- In office December 1, 2018 – November 15, 2026
- Preceded by: Randy Hope
- Succeeded by: Michael Bondy

Chatham-Kent Municipal Councillor for Ward 6
- In office December 1, 2014 – December 1, 2018
- Preceded by: Marjorie Crew; Anne Gilbert
- Succeeded by: Marjorie Crew; Amy Finn; Karen Kirkwood-Whyte
- Constituency: Ward 6 (Chatham)

Personal details
- Born: February 9, 1966 (age 60) Chatham, Ontario, Canada
- Party: Independent
- Spouse: Christine Johns
- Children: 4
- Education: Wilfrid Laurier University (BBA)
- Profession: Politician; accountant
- Website: Office of the Mayor

Darrin Canniff (born February 9, 1966) is a Canadian politician who served as the mayor of Chatham-Kent from December 1st, 2018 to November 15, 2026.

Canniff was born and raised in Chatham, Ontario. He attended elementary school at Winston Churchill School and high school at John McGregor Secondary School, and was educated at Wilfrid Laurier University, where he earned a Bachelor of Business Administration degree and received a Chartered Accountant (CA) designation. He received his CA while working for accounting firm KPMG.

== Career ==
=== Early career ===
Prior to entering politics, Canniff worked for Union Gas, where he was the director of planning and forecasting. He has also worked for Transform SSO and Greenfield Specialty Alcohols. He also led a number of charitable campaigns, such as such as the Festival of Giving and the 2006 United Way of Chatham-Kent campaign. He also served as a board chair at Mainstreet Credit Union, and was a board director for the Children's Treatment Centre Foundation of Chatham-Kent, past chair of the Prosperity Roundtable and past chair of Entegrus Inc.

=== Politics ===
Canniff first entered politics in the 2014 municipal elections, when he was elected to Chatham-Kent Municipal Council as one of six councillors for Ward 6 (Chatham). During his first term he served as co-chair of the 2018 International Plowing Match which was held in Pain Court.

Canniff was first elected as mayor in the 2018 municipal elections, defeating Alysson Storey and incumbent mayor Randy Hope, winning more than 56% of the vote. Canniff ran on a platform prioritizing "quality jobs" and "infrastructure". Hope had been seeking a fourth term as mayor, despite having promised to only serve for three terms. He had also been criticized for making business trips abroad.

After being elected as mayor, Canniff stated his priorities for 2019 could be summed in the statement "bringing community together", with one of his initiatives being 'Get Involved CK Campaign' to support volunteerism. He also planned on investing in local service clubs, which would result in a small tax increase. In his first year as mayor, he had to deal with an ice jam in the Thames River which caused flooding and the opening of a new casino in Chatham. Canniff's top priorities in 2020 included dealing with shoreline erosion, high speed internet and the reopening of Talbot Trail.

On October 26th, 2026, Canniff lost the 2026 Chatham-Kent Municipal Election against Councillor Michael Bondy. Canniff served as the Mayor of Chatham-Kent until November 14th, and Bondy stepped in as mayor on the 15th.
