= Chesterville, Ontario =

Chesterville
- Unincorporated community
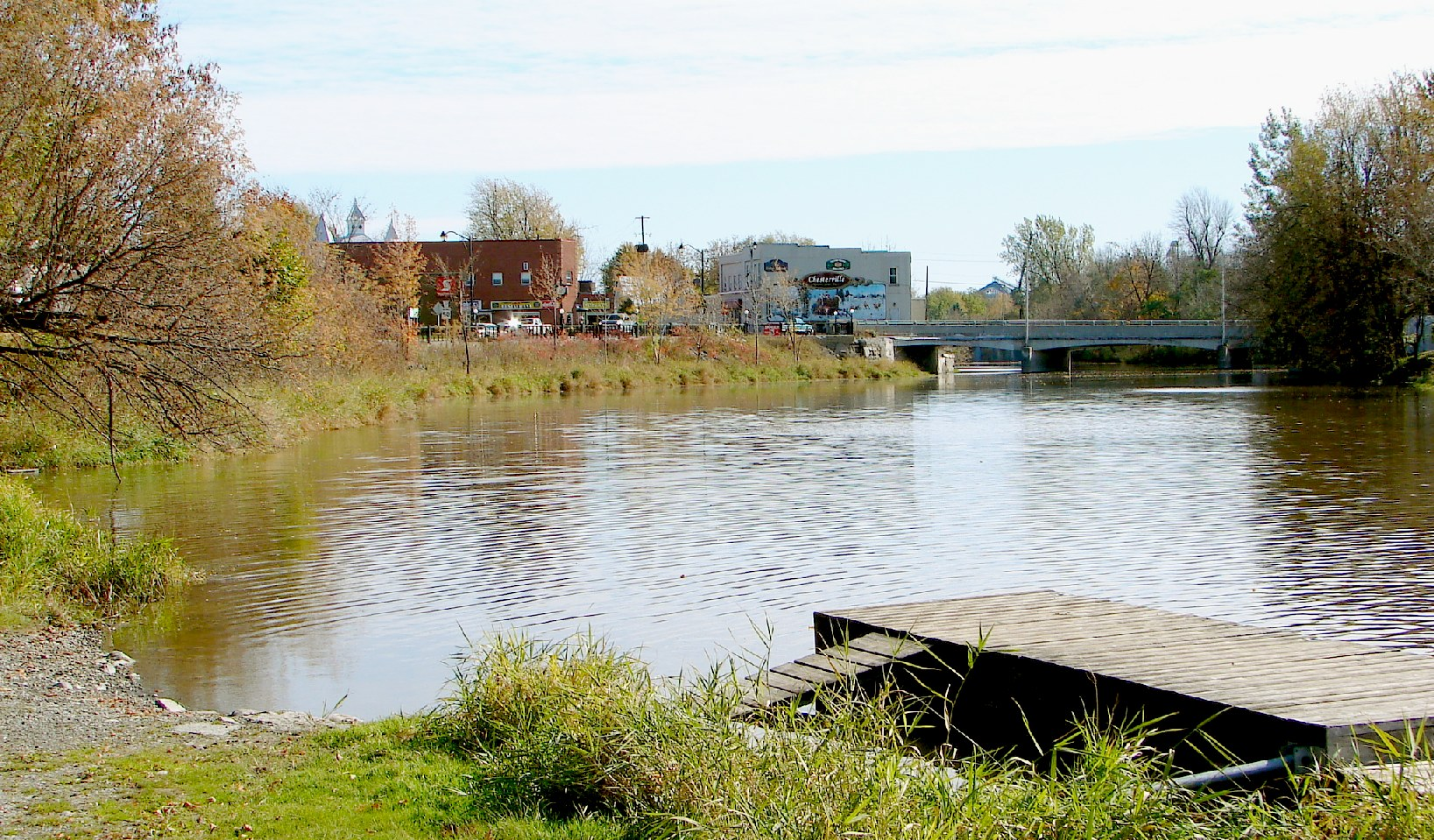
- Chesterville on the South Nation River

- Location in Stormont, Dundas and Glengarry Counties Chesterville (Southern Ontario)
- Coordinates: 45°06′13″N 75°13′52″W
- Country: Canada
- Province: Ontario
- County: Stormont, Dundas and Glengarry
- Municipality: North Dundas
- Settled: 1820s-1840s
- Incorporated: 1890 (Village)
- Dissolved (amalgamated): January 1, 1998
- Founder: George Hummel; Thomas Armstrong

Government
  - MP: Eric Duncan (CPC)
  - Fed. riding: Stormont—Dundas—South Glengarry
  - MPP: Nolan Quinn (PC)
  - Prov. riding: Stormont—Dundas—South Glengarry

Area
  - Land: 1.86 km^{2} (0.72 sq mi)
- Elevation: 70 m (230 ft)

Population (2021)
  - Total: 1,564
  - Density: 839.9/km^{2} (2,175/sq mi)
- Time zone: UTC-5 (EST)
  - Summer (DST): UTC-4 (EDT)
- Postal code FSA: K0C
- Area code(s): 613
- Website: www.northdundas.com

Chesterville is a village in the township of North Dundas, within the United Counties of Stormont, Dundas and Glengarry. It is located north of Morrisburg, west of Cornwall and south-east of Ottawa. The village is situated along the South Nation River.

== History ==
=== Early settlement ===
The land in what would become Dundas County was granted in 1784 to United Empire Loyalists, most of whom had fought with the King's Royal Regiment of New York during the American Revolution. Chesterville's first settlement was located along the South Nation River on Lots 17 and 18, in Concession 4 of Winchester Township, which was formed in 1798 from the northern portion of Williamsburg Township. The plot of land was originally granted in 1797 to Maria Anne Duncan, the daughter of UE Loyalist Colonel Richard Duncan, and namesake of Mariatown. Most of the land around Chesterville in Winchester township was originally granted to loyalist veterans and their children: lots north of the river in the 5th concession were originally granted to the Hon. John Munro, and lots 12-19 in the 7th concession to Sir Alexander Mackenzie.

Chesterville pioneer George Hummel purchased the west half of the property from Maria Anne’s estate around 1822 and went about erecting a mill, while John Pliny Crysler purchased the east half of the lot. The loft of Hummel's homestead served as the local gathering place during the early years of the village, and political meetings were often held there. Much of the land Hummel initially purchased was eventually sold off to pioneering settlers, often for a low price, and the land on which the community hall currently stands was once sold by Hummel for a "single barrel of whiskey".

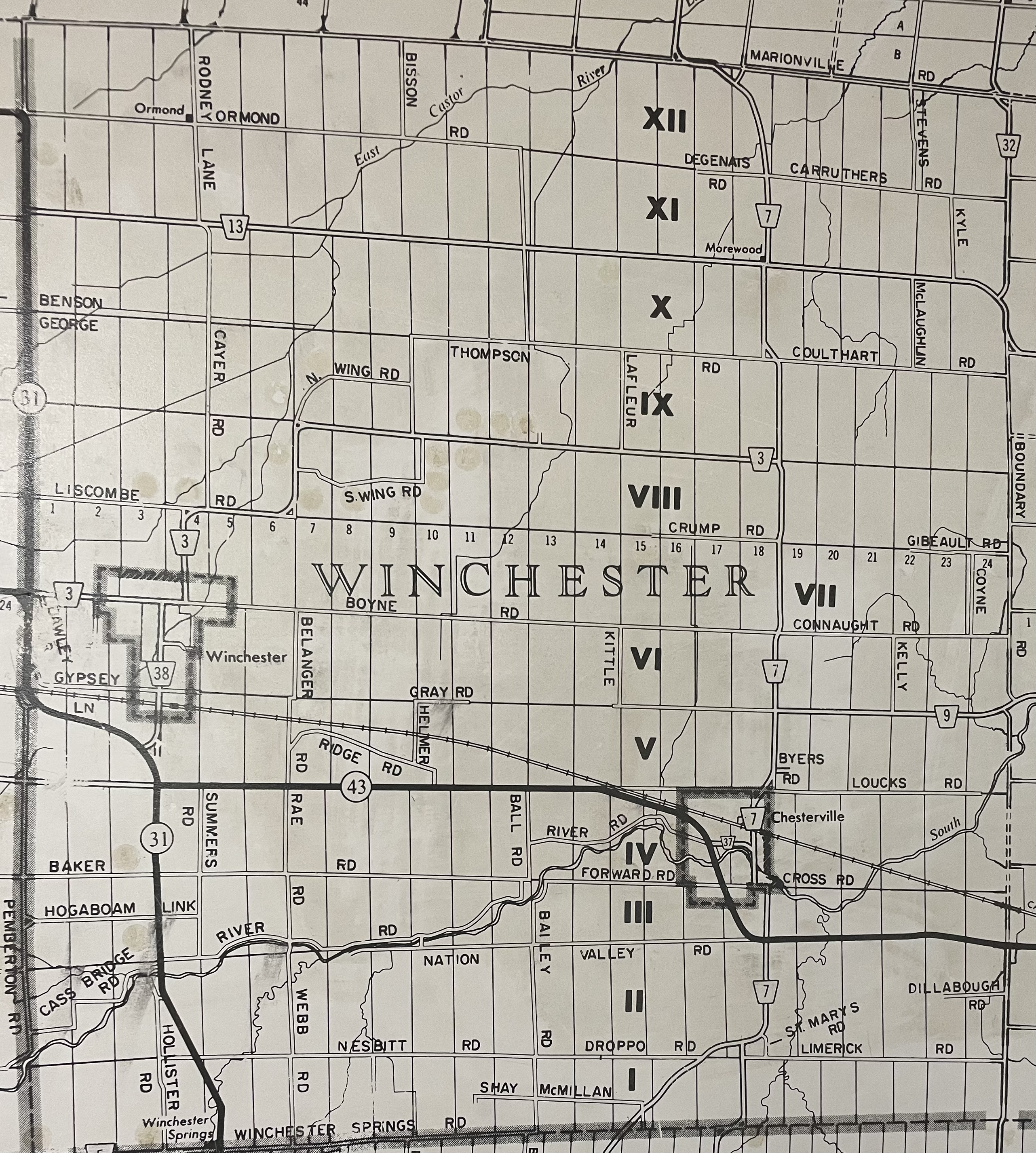
Map of Winchester Township with Chesterville marked in Conc. IV

Around 1825 or 1826, two Merkley brothers travelled from Williamsburg down the Nation River and established a camp with plans to build a mill on the banks of the river near Hummel's property. In December 1827, the Merkley brothers, Jacob (1794-1827) and Michael (1797-1827), travelled to Waddington, New York along with Solomon Sterns to secure supplies for a raising bee, but on the return trip a snowstorm blew over the St. Lawrence River and their canoe upset, drowning all three men.

Around 1828, Thomas Armstrong and his son John established a saw mill and later a grist mill on land purchased from George Hummel that the deceased Merkley brothers had intended to use, and by 1838 it had attracted many settlers to the area, the settlement subsequently being named Armstrong's Mills. The original mills built by Armstrong burned in a fire around 1867. Many Irish immigrants settled in Chesterville in the 1830s-50s, some fleeing the Great Potato Famine. Many of these Irish settlers were Catholics and established St. Mary’s Catholic parish in the area. The settlements of Limerick, Boyne, and Connaught were originally settled and named by these Irish pioneers.

In the early days of the village, the post and mail had to be collected by individuals from the mail office in Morrisburg or Cornwall, but in 1845 a post office was opened in the village under the name of Winchester and the mail was delivered by horseback from Morrisburg.

Historical records suggest that although the post office and village were officially named Winchester, the community was known locally as Chesterville possibly as early as the 1840s, and for a short time as Hummelville. The name East Winchester also seems to have been briefly used during the 1860s and 1870s. The 1851 census notes the village as Chesterville and several documents from 1855 and 1863 use that name. The Canada Directory of 1857-58 notes that Chesterville [Winchester] “has a large trade with the surrounding country which is well settled. It has a tri-weekly mail and a population of about 500”.

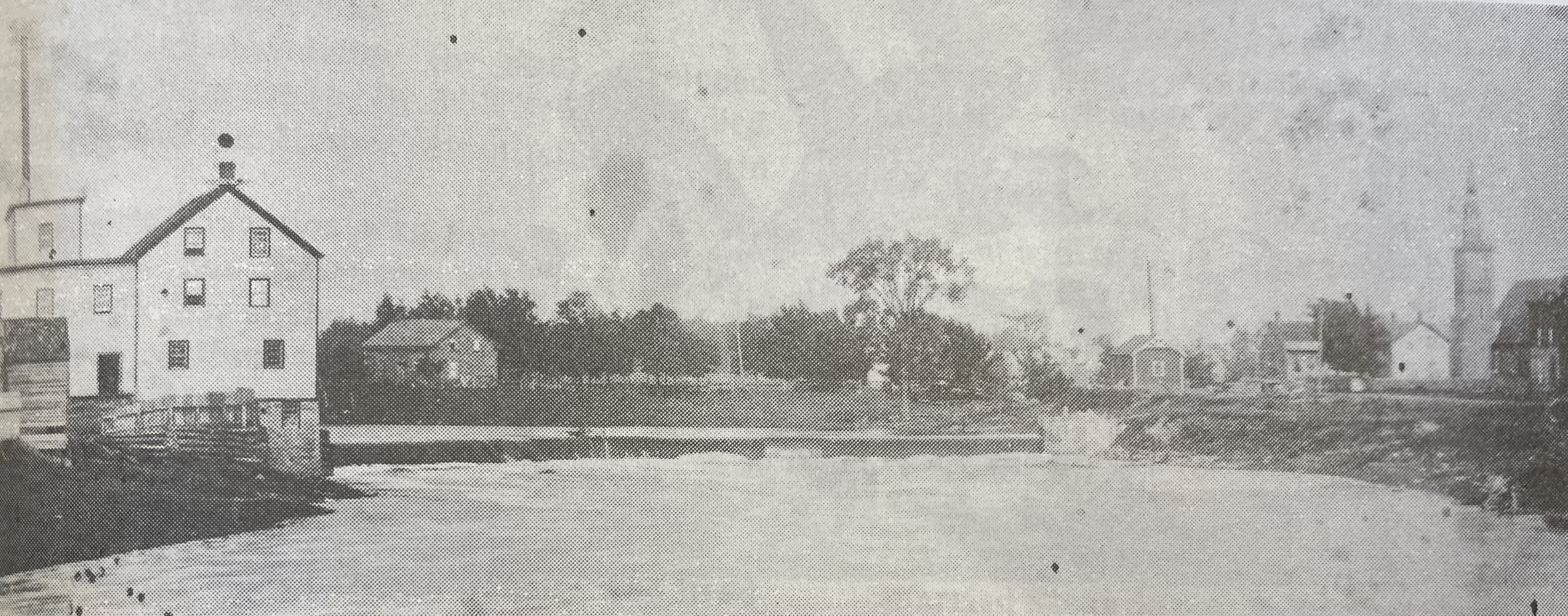
Looking south on the Nation River in Chesterville, c.1885. The old mill can be seen on the left and Trinity Anglican Church can be seen on the right. The original 1840s wooden foot bridge spans the river.

In July 1872, a telegraph office was opened in the village. Because the names of many local communities included the name Winchester (such as Winchester Township, West Winchester, East Winchester, North Winchester, and Winchester Springs), the Montreal Telegraph Company suggested that the name of the village be changed to avoid confusion. After a petition was circulated, the name was officially changed to Chesterville in 1875.

In 1887, the Canadian Pacific Railway opened a station in the town, leading to further settlement and incorporation as a village in 1890. The town hall was built in 1867 and was subsequently used as a fire hall, jailhouse, court house, and movie theatre, and currently serves as the heritage centre and village museum.

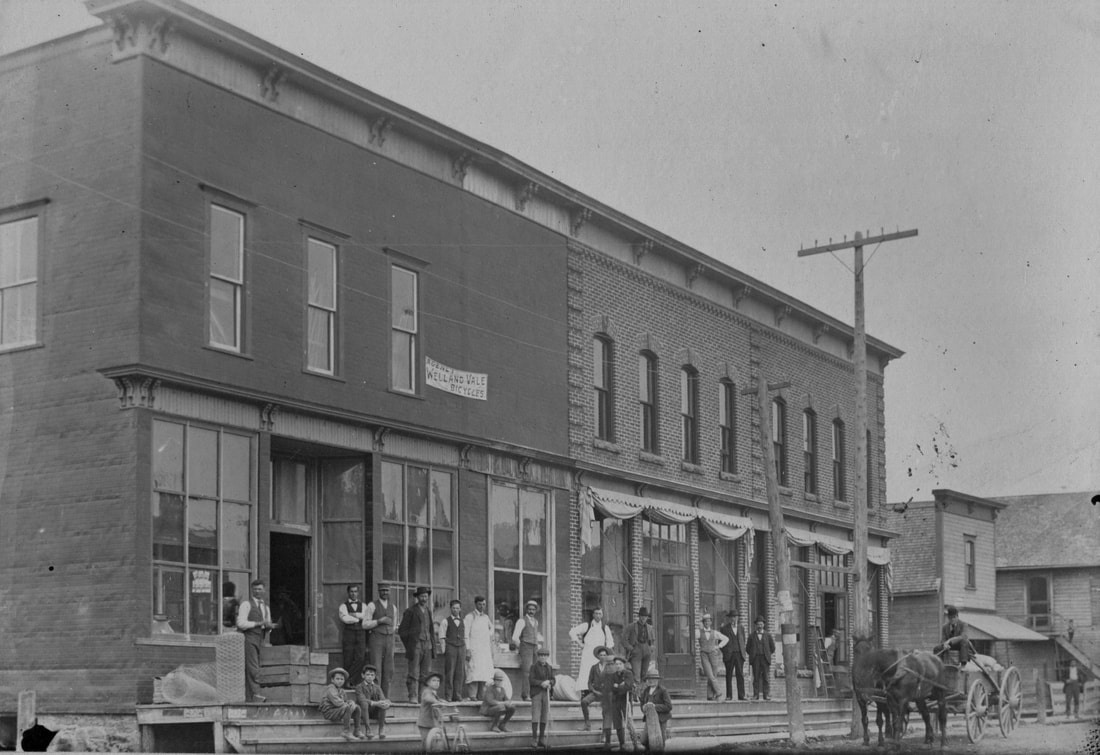
Sanders, Soule & Casselman's general store on King Street, c.1900

==== Local families ====
Many of the original early settlers in the Chesterville district were Scottish and Irish immigrants as well as some Loyalist Germans from Williamsburg, Matilda, Stormont, and Grenville.

Early Settler Families of Chesterville
| Hummel | Armstrong | Bigford/Bickford |
| Merkley | Moran | Ouderkirk |
| Curran | Forward | Coyne |
| Marcellus | Kearns | Clement |
| McCloskey | McMahon | Casselman |
| Rae | Harper | Dillabough |
| Rose | Bogart | Wheeler |
| Servage | Jordan | Droppo |

Following the destruction of the Second World War in Europe, many Dutch families immigrated to Canada in the early 1950s-60s, settling in the Chesterville area. Many of these immigrants would go on to become successful and prominent members of the community, and Chesterville district continues to be home to a large Canadian-Dutch population. Chesterville held an annual Dutch Dance for many years at the local Legion.

Dutch Settler Families of Chesterville District
| Vanden Bosch | Van Kessel | Derks |
| Schoones | Logtens | Van Delst |
| Byvelds | Vloet | Scheepers |
| Brugmans | Hoogeveen | Verhoeven |
| Van Dongen | De Jong | Geertsma |
| Sanders | Berkers | De Rooy |

=== Great fire of 1909 ===
On 6 April 1909, part of Chesterville's business section was destroyed by fire. Newspaper accounts state that the fire started at the north-east corner of King and Water Streets (now 1 King Street) in a wooden-framed building that contained the tailor shop of W. J. Nash on the first floor and the Masonic Hall on the second. The flames travelled in two directions: East down Water Street to the Chesterville Record office, which destroyed the printing presses; and North up King Street, jumping from one building to the next until it reached Ralph Street. The King Street businesses affected (in order from Water Street to Ralph) were: Nash's tailor shop, Wilford Saucier's jewellery store, Isaac Pelletier's confectionary and fruit store, Gordon Robinson's blacksmith shop, Joseph Fisher and Colborne Robinson's butcher shop and the Sanders, Soule and Casselman general store.

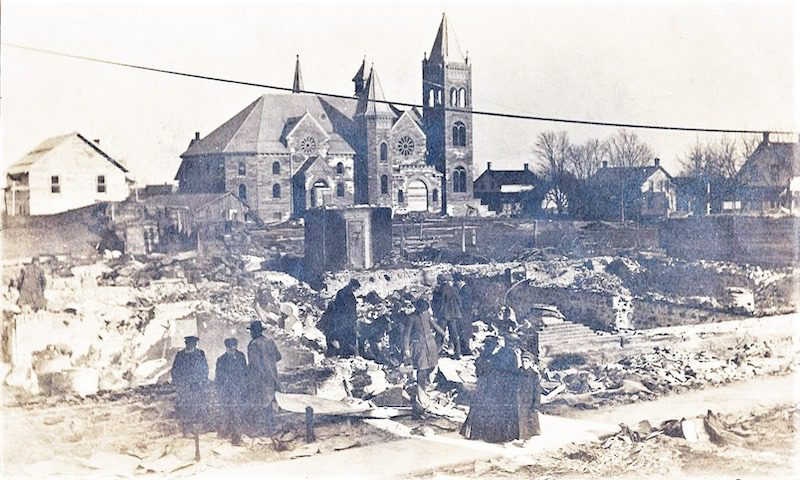
Ruins of the stores on King Street after the great fire.

The village could do very little to stop it, as they had only one hand pump and pails for water. This was the second major fire on that they had seen in a short period; exactly three weeks earlier on 16 March, fire broke out at the North end of King Street, burning down the Temperance Hotel and Foster's Hall and damaging the CPR train station and water tower.

Following these incidents, the village quickly took steps to improve their fire protection. In May, a by-law was prepared by the village council to mandate that only "fireproof" buildings (such as brick and stone) could be constructed in the business section of town. In the summer of 1909, the village purchased a steam pumper fire engine. Frank McCloskey was appointed fire chief and formed a brigade. However, the first fire hydrants were not installed in the village until 1916, when Hires Condensed Milk Co. (later Nestle) installed a water main along Queen and Main Streets.

After losing their printing presses in the fire, the Chesterville Record staff worked from a temporary office in Thomas McMahon's blacksmith shop on Main Street south of the CPR line. They resumed printing on 6 May 1909. Because they were so quick to return to business, news articles and advertisements exist that tell the progress of the town's recovery from this disaster.

In the year that followed, new buildings were erected to replace those that were lost. Sanders, Soule and Casselman rebuilt their store on its previous site (south-east corner of King and Ralph, now 19 King Street). The Fisher Block was constructed next door, and Joe Fisher and Isaac Pelletier continued their businesses there. It burned down in 1989 and now serves as a parking lot. A new office for the Chesterville Record was built at what is now 7 King Street. Part of the building was rented out by Wilford Saucier, who carried on his jewellery business. The Record remained there until the summer of 2018, and the office was demolished in December of that year. The Hamilton Block, built by Wesley Hamilton, replaced W. J. Nash's tailor shop on the north-east corner of King and Water Streets. It includes what is now 1, 3, and 5 King Street.

=== Later history ===
In the early 1920s, Chesterville became the first town in Dundas County to get a paved road, and the village flourished with businesses.

On January 1, 1998, the villages of Winchester and Chesterville were amalgamated with Winchester and Mountain Townships to form the Township of North Dundas.

=== Ice storm of 1998 ===
Between January 4 and 10, 1998, over 80 millimeters of freezing rain fell in the area, greatly damaging the power grid and infrastructure. Hydro poles and power lines were crumpled and broken. Shelters were established throughout North Dundas, and Chesterville hosted 100 beds, 75 at the Fawcet Pub, and 25 at the Legion Hall. The village power grid was restored on January 10, but many individual homes were without power for further days. 114 soldiers from the Royal Canadian Dragoons were billeted at North Dundas District High School during Operation Recuperation, the largest peacetime deployment of the Canadian Army. Prime Minister Jean Chretien visited the area along with Ontario Premier Mike Harris.

=== Military history ===
==== Early militia ====
The military history of Dundas County and Chesterville dates back to the early settlement days, when Loyalist veterans of the American Revolution were granted plots of land in Upper Canada and raised a local militia. Some of the earliest land grants in Winchester Township were to veterans of the Revolution, and many more were veterans of the War of 1812. Dundas County had raised a militia as far back as 1788, and during the War of 1812 the men fought with the 1st Regiment of Dundas Militia. Many of these veterans would be granted plots of land in Dundas County, settling in Winchester Township. Early War of 1812 veterans and settlers in Chesterville District include Henry Hawn and William Casselman who served with the Dundas Militia, and as many as 10 veterans of the war later lived in the village, including Henry Ouderkirk, a veteran of the Incorporated Battalion, who was one of the first inn keepers.

Early settlers of the village included British Army veterans as well, including John Irwin Ker, formerly of the 57th Regiment of Foot during the Napoleonic Wars. His son, John Irvin Ker, left Chesterville and fought in the American Civil War with the 4th Minnesota Infantry Regiment.

From 1829 to 1836, No.9 Company of the 1st Dundas Militia served both Mountain and Winchester townships. In 1837, the Dundas County Militia was reorganized into two battalions with the 1st Battalion (Winchester and Williamsburg Townships) commanded by Col. John Crysler and Lt-Col. J. McDonell. No. 3 Company under Capt. John Merkley and No.10 Company under Capt. Robert Gray were now located in Winchester Township and headquartered in Chesterville. The companies were called out with the Embodied Dundas Militia and served during the Rebellions of 1837–1838 at the Battle of the Windmill and Prescott. Over 50 local men served in various militia regiments during the Rebellion.

In 1842, the Dundas Militia was again reorganized into three battalions, the 3rd Battalion serving Winchester and Mountain Townships with No.2, No.3, and No.8 companies located in Winchester township. Finally in 1852 the Dundas Militia was separated into four battalions, the 4th (Winchester) Battalion serving Winchester Township and headquartered in Chesterville under Lt-Col. Jacob Brouse.

With the passage of the Militia Act of 1855, the counties of Leeds, Dundas, Stormont and Glengarry became part of Military District No. 2, and in the militia report for 1859, the 4th (Winchester) Battalion, Dundas Militia was commanded by Lt-Col. J.P. Crysler. From 1857 to 1862, No.3 Company under Capt. George Fitchell, No.5 Company under Capt. Giles Bogart, and No.8 Company under Capt. William Munro were located in and around the village of Chesterville.

Village founder George Hummel was appointed an Ensign in the 4th Dundas in 1853, promoted to Lieutenant in 1855, and retired in 1858. Another village founder, Thomas Armstrong, was appointed a Lieutenant in the battalion in 1847, with his son John appointed as an Ensign.

In September 1857, a group of villagers petitioned the Adjutant General of the Militia to raise a local volunteer company of 50 men in Chesterville. The Volunteer Rifle Company of Winchester was proposed and John McCuaig was appointed Captain, George Ford as Lieutenant, and William Garvey as Ensign. In November, McCuaig was replaced by John Capell as Captain, and Francis Blakely was appointed Surgeon. By 1858 however the company’s petition was rejected due to lack of open positions for militia companies. The men in the district would continue to serve in the sedentary 4th Battalion.

6 men from the Chesterville area served in the Union Army during the American Civil War. James A. Munro was captured at Chaffin's Farm, Solomon Kittle, whose family Kittle Road is named for, died in 1864 from wounds received in the Atlanta campaign, and Justus Durant was killed at Cold Harbor.

Men from Chesterville and district served during the American troubles and Fenian Raids period, including Isaac Wingard and Joseph Dillabough who served with the Williamsburg Rifles. In January 1862, in response to the Trent Affair, a volunteer service company was raised in Chesterville from the 4th Dundas Battalion. 84 men volunteered under Capt. George Fitchell, Lt. John A. Shaver, and Ens. Matthew Rae.

In 1869, the four sedentary battalions of the Dundas Militia were reorganized into six companies as the Dundas Reserve Militia, and No. 6 Company became the Winchester Company. Giles W. Bogart served as Captain, with David Rae as Lieutenant and Jeremiah Fitzgibbons as Ensign. The reserve militia existed until the early 20th century, with all men in the township nominally enrolled and an annual muster occurring.

Wesley B. Lawson from Chesterville served on active duty in Toronto with the 2nd Queen’s Own Rifles during the North-West Rebellion, and local doctor Robert Reddick was Assistant Surgeon for the Northwest Field Force.

==== World Wars ====
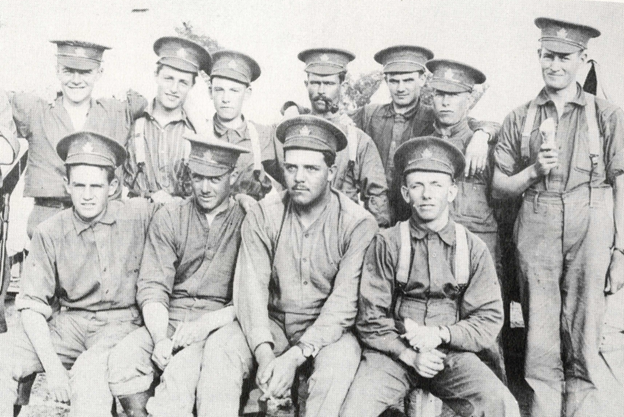
Chesterville men of the 154th Battalion, CEF, WW1

During World War One, many men from Chesterville served with the 154th (Stormont-Dundas-Glengarry) Battalion, CEF and other regiments in France and Belgium.

During World War II, men and women from Chesterville again served with the S.D.& G. Highlanders among other army regiments as well as the Royal Canadian Air Force and Royal Canadian Navy.

==== War memorials ====
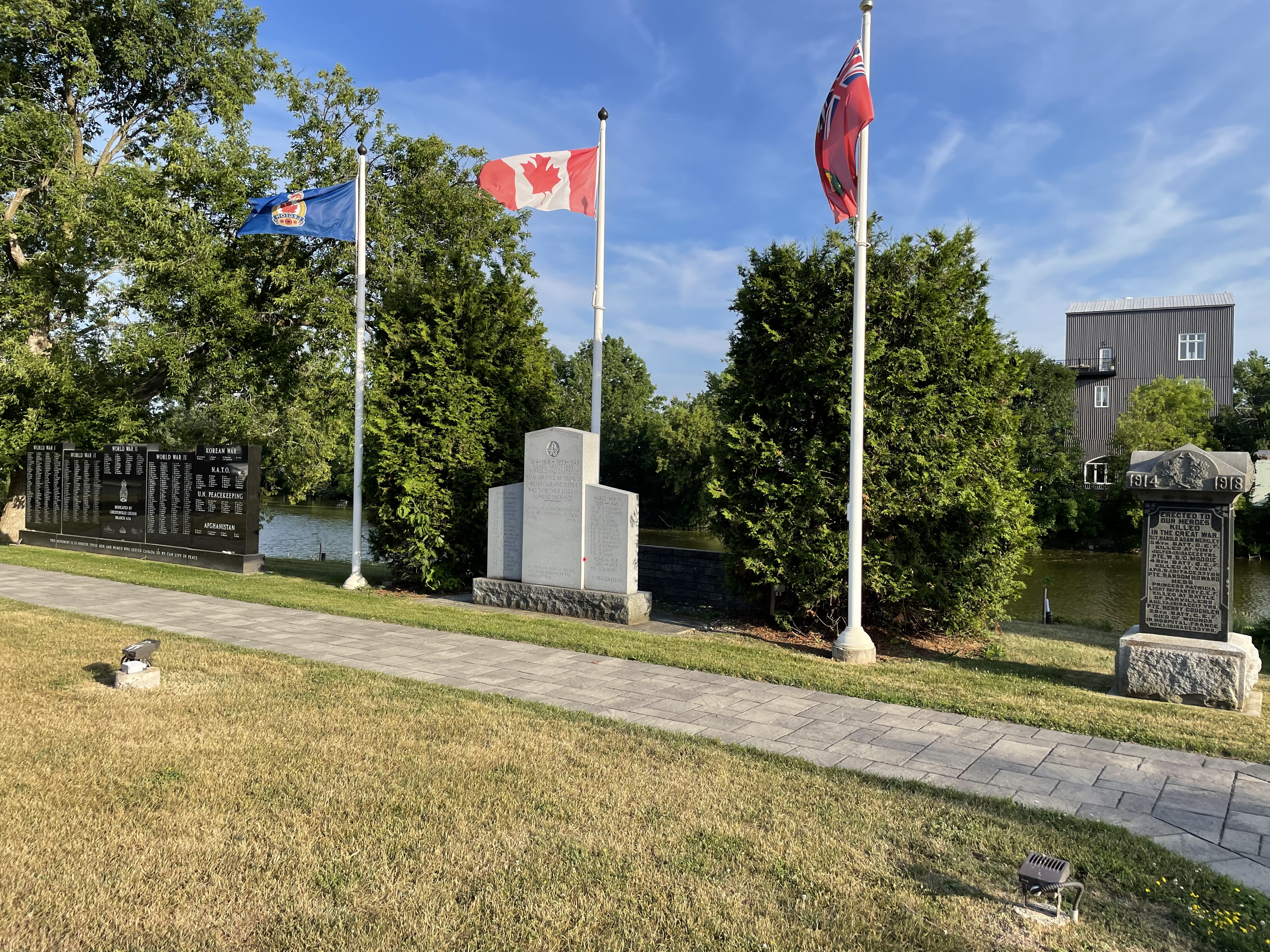
Chesterville Veterans Memorial Park

On 10 November 1957, the Chesterville Legion unveiled the cenotaph on the grounds of the Community Hall (1 Mill Street) to honour those lost during the World Wars. Forty years later in 1997, the cenotaph was moved to a park on Queen Street and expanded to include wings on each side with names of local soldiers who died in World War I and II and the Korean War. It was unveiled on 28 September 1997 and in November of that year, the park was renamed Veterans Memorial Park.

In the spring and summer of 2015, the park was updated and a new pathway, flag pole, and benches were installed, along with extra floodlights and shrubbery. A new black granite monument was erected beside the original cenotaph and features the names of all the local veterans who served in the World Wars, Korea, NATO and UN missions, and Afghanistan. Part of this project also included relocating the Nation Valley Cenotaph to the park, which was completed in August. The Nation Valley Cenotaph was originally unveiled on 23 August 1922 on the grounds of Nation Valley Public School (S.S. No. 5) on River Road, west of Chesterville.

== Geography ==
Located in the township of North Dundas, Ontario, it is bordered by North Stormont to the north-east, Winchester to the west, South Dundas to the south, and Russell to the north.

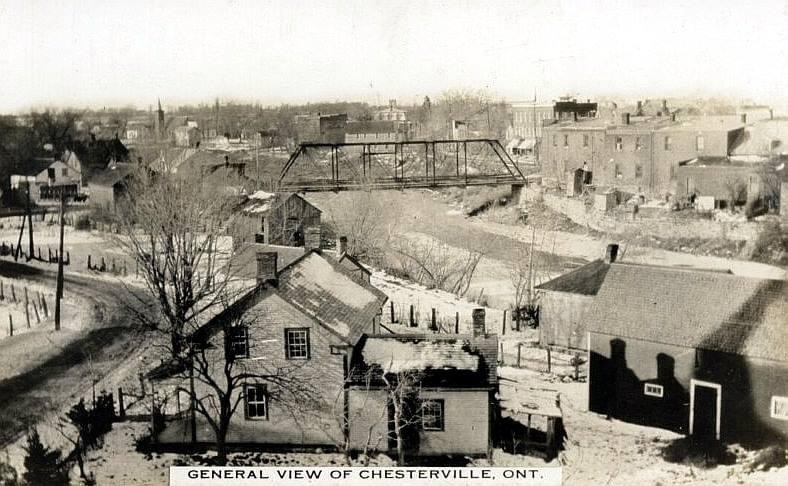
View of downtown Chesterville, c.1908

The village is surrounded by several small settlements and hamlets that comprise the larger Chesterville District:

- Connaught
- Limerick
- The Boyne
- Forward
- Maple Ridge
- Nation Valley
- Bethune Bush
- Dunbar (part of South Dundas)

== Demographics ==
Canada census – Chesterville community profile

| | 2021 | 2016 | 2011 |
| Population | 1,564 (-6.7% from 2016) | 1,677 (+15.8% from 2011) | 1,514 (-0.9% from 2006) |
| Land area | 1.86 km^{2} (0.72 sq mi) | 1.86 km^{2} (0.72 sq mi) | 2.29 km^{2} (0.88 sq mi) |
| Population density | 839.9/km^{2} (2,175/sq mi) | 900.3/km^{2} (2,332/sq mi) | 660.2/km^{2} (1,710/sq mi) |
| Median age | 47.6 (M: 45.2, F: 48.8) | 45.2 (M: 43.4, F: 46.4) | 44.8 (M: 43.6, F: 45.8) |
| Private dwellings | 651 (total) 636 (occupied) | 699 (total) 678 (occupied) | 673 (total) |
| Median household income | $78,000 | $68,267 |

References: 2021 2016 2011

Historical census populations – Chesterville (Village 1890–1997; Population Centre 1998–present)

| Year | Pop. | ±% |
|---|---|---|
| 1891 | 775 | — |
| 1901 | 932 | +20.3% |
| 1911 | 883 | −5.3% |
| 1921 | 967 | +9.5% |
| 1931 | 1,012 | +4.7% |
| 1941 | 1,067 | +5.4% |
| 1951 | 1,094 | +2.5% |

| Year | Pop. | ±% |
|---|---|---|
| 1956 | 1,169 | +6.9% |
| 1961 | 1,248 | +6.8% |
| 1966 | 1,258 | +0.8% |
| 1971 | 1,252 | −0.5% |
| 1976 | 1,324 | +5.8% |
| 1981 | 1,430 | +8.0% |
| 1986 | 1,498 | +4.8% |

| Year | Pop. | ±% |
|---|---|---|
| 1991 | 1,559 | +4.1% |
| 1996 | 1,497 | −4.0% |
| 2001 | 1,479 | −1.2% |
| 2006 | 1,528 | +3.3% |
| 2011 | 1,514 | −0.9% |
| 2016 | 1,677 | +10.8% |
| 2021 | 1,564 | −6.7% |

Population counts are not adjusted for boundary changes.
Source: Statistics Canada

== Government ==
Chesterville, Dundas County, has been represented in Parliament by various Ridings during the vast political history of Canada:

Federal Political Representation and Ridings
| Parliament | Years | Riding |
|---|---|---|
| Parliament of Canada | 1867–1925 | Riding of Dundas |
| Parliament of Canada | 1925–1966 | Riding of Grenville—Dundas |
| Parliament of Canada | 1966–1999 | Riding of Stormont—Dundas |
| Parliament of Canada | 1999–2004 | Riding of Stormont—Dundas—Charlottenburgh |
| Parliament of Canada | 2004–2025 | Riding of Stormont—Dundas—South Glengarry |
| Parliament of Canada | 2004–2025 | Riding of Stormont—Dundas—Glengarry |

Provincial Political Representation and Ridings
| Parliament | Years | Riding |
|---|---|---|
| Legislative Assembly of Upper Canada | 1792–1840 | Riding of Dundas |
| Legislative Assembly of the Province of Canada | 1840–1867 | Riding of Dundas |
| Legislative Assembly of Ontario | 1867–1934 | Riding of Dundas |
| Legislative Assembly of Ontario | 1934–1975 | Riding of Grenville-Dundas |
| Legislative Assembly of Ontario | 1975–1995 | Riding of Stormont-Dundas and Glengarry |
| Legislative Assembly of Ontario | 1995–1999 | Riding of Stormont-Dundas-Glengarry and East Grenville |
| Legislative Assembly of Ontario | 1999–2007 | Riding of Stormont-Dundas and Charlottenburg |
| Legislative Assembly of Ontario | 2007–Present | Riding of Stormont-Dundas-South Glengarry |

From incorporation as a village in 1890 until amalgamation into the township in 1998, Chesterville was represented by many Reeves and Councillors:

Chesterville Village Municipal Officers
| Year | Reeve & Deputy Reeve | Councillors |
|---|---|---|
| 1890–1891 | Miles Brown | Michael Grady; Francis Sharkey; Chester Casselman; J.G. Gillespie |
| 1891–1892 | W.N. Barrie | Michael Grady; Chester Casselman; Allan Merkley; James Bogart |
| 1892–1893 | W.N. Barrie | J.C. Casselman; Michael Grady; Miles Brown; George Hamilton |
| 1893–1896 | W.B. Lawson | Miles Brown; J.C. Casselman; Michael Grady; Isaac Garrow |
| 1896–1898 | W.B. Lawson | Miles Brown; J.C. Casselman; P.D. Grady; A.C. Garrow |
| 1898–1899 | J.G. Gillespie | P.D. Grady; C.J. Soule; A.C. Garrow; A.S. Morrison |
| 1899–1900 | J.G. Gillespie | P.D. Grady; Irwin Ball; Cephrenus Hummel; C.B. Rae |
| 1900–1901 | George Hamilton | Irwin Ball; Vene Robinson; J.P. Bogart; Wm. Huxtable |
| 1901–1903 | W.B. Lawson | Miles Brown; J.C. Casselman; P.D. Grady; Wm. Huxtable |
| 1903–1904 | William Rae | Hugh Kearns; P.D. Grady; Thomas McGee; Giles Whiteside Bogart |
| 1904–1905 | William Rae | P.D. Grady; P.P. Coyne; Wm.A. Merkley; Wm. Huxtable |
| 1905–1906 | W.B. Lawson | A.M. Fulton; Wm. Huxtable; F.W. Merkley; L.A. Zufelt |
| 1906–1907 | L.A. Zufelt | T. Houlehan; Chas. Chambers; F.W. Merkley; Wm. Huxtable |
| 1907–908 | Wm. Huxtable | L.A. Zufelt; Chas. Chambers; W.F. Fulton; C.F. Robinson |
| 1908–1909 | Vene Robinson | Thomas McGee; Chas. Chambers; John Jordan; Calvin Simser |
| 1909–1910 | Vene Robinson | W. Brown; Geo. Ellis; Chas. Chambers; Thomas McGee |
| 1910–1911 | Wesley Hamilton | Geo. Ellis; Chas. Chambers; Hugh Kearns; Harry G. Merkley |
| 1911–1912 | W.A. Brown | Orren Casselman; Geo. Ellis; Chas. Chambers; H.G. Merkley |
| 1912–1913 | Chas. Chambers | H.G. Merkley; Geo. Ellis; Thomas Houlehan; Wesley Hamilton |
| 1913–1914 | Giles Whiteside Bogart | J.H. Fulton; F.M. Sanders; Lawrence Jordan; Thomas Houlehan Jr. |
| 1914–1915 | Giles W. Bogart | J.H. Fulton; T.O. Keyes; Lawrence Jordan; Thomas Houlehan Jr. |
| 1915–1916 | Wesley Hamilton | F.W. Merkley; John Murphy; Lawrence Jordan; Thomas Houlehan |
| 1916–1917 | Wesley Hamilton | Thomas Ellis; John Murphy; Lawrence Jordan; Thomas Houlehan |
| 1917–1918 | Giles W. Bogart | Isaac Pelletier; F.W. Merkley; Thomas Ellis; J.T. Kearns |
| 1918–1919 | Wesley Hamilton | F.W. Merkley; Ed. Flynn; W.O. Dixon; Thomas Houlehan |
| 1919–1920 | Wesley Hamilton | A.H. Forbes; Cephrenus Hummel; Thomas Houlehan; Chas. Chambers |
| 1920–1921 | Wesley Hamilton | A.H. Forbes; Cephrenus Hummel; Thomas Houlehan; Isaac Pelletier |
| 1921–1922 | Wesley Hamilton | J.H. Fulton; Cephrenus Hummel; Thomas Houlehan; David Allison |
| 1922–1923 | Wesley Hamilton | Isaac Pelletier; Cephrenus Hummel; Lawrence Jordan; A.H. Forbes |
| 1923–1924 | Wesley Hamilton | Isaac Pelletier; Cephrenus Hummel; W.O. Dixon; C.W. Casselman |
| 1924–1925 | Wesley Hamilton | Isaac Pelletier; C.W. Casselman; Frank Dwyer; A.H. Forbes |
| 1925–1928 | Wesley Hamilton | W.B. Lawson; S.H. Hutt; Jas. Masterson; Isaac Garrow |
| 1928–1929 | J.H. Brownlee | W.B. Lawson; S.H. Hutt; Jas. Masterson; Isaac Garrow |
| 1929–1930 | Wesley Hamilton | C. Hummel; S.H. Hutt; Jas. Masterson; G.H. Barkley |
| 1930–1931 | Wesley Hamilton | Isaac Pelletier; C. Hummel; R.J. Barrie; A.B. Clayton |
| 1931–1932 | W.H. Casselman | A.B. Clayton; David Allison; Thomas Allen; R.J. Barrie |
| 1932–1933 | W.H. Casselman | A.B. Clayton; David Allison; J.T. Kearns; G.H. Barkley |
| 1933–1934 | W.H. Casselman | Thomas Flynn; F.W. Merkley; C.F. Marshall; G.H. Barkley |

Chesterville Village Municipal Officers
| Year | Reeve & Deputy Reeve | Councillors |
|---|---|---|
| 1934–1935 | W.H. Casselman | C.F. Marshall; Melvin Durant; P.S. Boyd; D.A. McDonald |
| 1935–1936 | W.H. Casselman | R.J. Barrie; Melvin Durant; P.S. Boyd; Thomas Allen |
| 1936–1937 | W.H. Casselman | W.H. Fairbrass; Melvin Durant; P.S. Boyd; Thomas Allen |
| 1937–1938 | W.H. Casselman | W.H. Fairbrass; G.H. Barkley; R.J. Barrie; H.C. Hummel |
| 1938–1939 | W.H. Casselman | Ralph G. Smith; G.H. Barkley; R.J. Barrie; H.C. Hummel |
| 1939–1940 | W.H. Casselman | Thomas Allen; G.H. Barkley; R.J. Barrie; H.C. Hummel |
| 1940–1942 | W.H. Casselman | Thomas Allen; Herman Hummel; Geo. Barkley; Ralph Smith |
| 1942–1944 | George Barkley | Thomas Allen; Herman Hummel; Robert J. Barrie; Ralph Smith |
| 1944–1945 | George Barkley | Thomas Allen; Herman Hummel; Robert J. Barrie; Leon Marcellus |
| 1945–1946 | George Barkley | Charles McMillan; Sidney Morris; Robert J. Barrie; Leon Marcellus |
| 1946–1947 | George Barkley | Charles McMillan; Perley Boyd; John Morris; George Gillard |
| 1947–1948 | Perley Boyd | Charles McMillan; John Turner; Glen Merkley; Matthew Flynn |
| 1948–1949 | Charles McMillan | John Turner; Carl McMillan; Harold Hamilton; Milton Phillips |
| 1949–1951 | Charles McMillan | Haldane Durant; John Turner; James Brannen; Lawrence Doering |
| 1951–1952 | Charles McMillan | Haldane Durant; Carl McMillan; James Brannen; R.G. Smith |
| 1952–1953 | Charles McMillan | Haldane Durant; Carl McMillan; James Brannen; Marshall Page |
| 1953–1954 | Charles McMillan | Carl McMillan; John Turner; Marshall Page; Gordon Lannin |
| 1954–1955 | Charles McMillan | Carl McMillan; John Turner; Stella Campbell; Anna Marcellus |
| 1955–1956 | Charles McMillan | Stella Campbell; Anna Marcellus; Frank Arnold; Harold Sharkey |
| 1956–1958 | Charles McMillan | Carl Merkley; Edwin Merkley; Frank Arnold; Harold Sharkey |
| 1958–1959 | Charles McMillan | J.A. Butcher; Edwin Merkley; Frank Arnold; Harold Sharkey |
| 1959–1960 | Carl Merkley | J.A. Butcher; Keith Graham; George LaFlamme; Harold Sharkey |
| 1960–1964 | Carl Merkley | James Fyke; Keith Graham; George LaFlamme; Harold Sharkey |
| 1964–1965 | Carl Merkley | James Fyke; Garnet Droppo; George LaFlamme; Harold Sharkey |
| 1965–1966 | Carl Merkley | Keith Graham; Garnet Droppo; George LaFlamme; Harold Sharkey |
| 1966–1967 | Carl Merkley | Keith Graham; James Fyke; Allan Clement; James Moran |
| 1967–1968 | Carl Merkley | Keith Graham; Gordon Lannin; Allan Clement; Lorne Trimble |
| 1968–1969 | James Brannen | Adolphe Lauzon; Fred Coons; Harry Allison; Ernest Kelly |
| 1969–1971 | James Brannen | Archie Black; Fred Coons; Harry Allison; Ernest Kelly |
| 1971–1975 | Keith Graham | Archie Black; Fred Coons; Stuart Allan; Jack Lannin |
| 1975–1977 | Keith Graham | Archie Black; Nelson LaPrade; Stuart Allan; Garnet Droppo |
| 1977–1979 | James Brannen | Stuart Allan; Mac LaSalle; Bert Van Kessel; Garnet Droppo |
| 1979–1981 | James Brannen | Al Kennedy; Erik Thompson; Bert Van Kessel; Carl Ward |
| 1981–1983 | Carl Ward; Bert Van Kessel | Bryan Beazer; W. James Cook; Michael Coyne |
| 1983–1985 | Carl Ward; W. James Cook | Michael Brannen; Rudi Derstroff; James Sullivan |
| 1985–1989 | Carl Ward; Bert Van Kessel | Roger Cole; Shirley Coons; Mike McMahon |
| 1989–1991 | James Cook; Shirley Coons | Roger Cole; Peter Van Kessel; Mike McMahon |
| 1991–1995 | James Cook; Shirley Coons | Martin Derks; Roger Cole; Peter Van Kessel |
| 1995–1997 | James Cook; Shirley Coons | Sharon Casselman; Gail Parker; Peter Van Kessel |

== Clubs and community groups ==
=== Current groups ===
- Chesterville and District Agricultural Society: Established in 1931 at 153 Queen Street (host of the Chesterville fair), it grew out of the Dundas County Agricultural Society which was formed in 1861
- Rotary Club of Chesterville: Established in 1938, the Rotary Club has been involved with many of the projects and events in the village.
- Royal Canadian Legion Branch No.434: Established in 1946 and located on John Street until 1999 when a large new hall was built at the corner of Queen Street and Industrial Drive
- Chesterville and District Historical Society: Established in 1984 at the old Town Hall at 14 Victoria Street (the Chesterville and District Heritage Centre)
- Chesterville and District Lions Club: established in 1987
- Nation Valley Snowmobile Association: Established in 1994
- Chesterville Kayak Club: Established in 2010

=== Past groups ===
- Chesterville Masonic Lodge No.320 A.F.&A.M.: Established in 1874 on King Street, the original lodge was destroyed in the great fire of 1909. The Masonic and Oddfellows lodges combined in 1912 to build the lodge on Main Street
- Chesterville Citizens' Band: Established in 1876, the Band Hall was originally located on the second floor in the Fulton Block before moving to the Old Town Hall, which also accommodated the Fire Brigade and the Scout Troop. The Band faded in the 1940s and was replaced by small independent bands and orchestras.
- Independent Order of Oddfellows No.288: Established in 1892

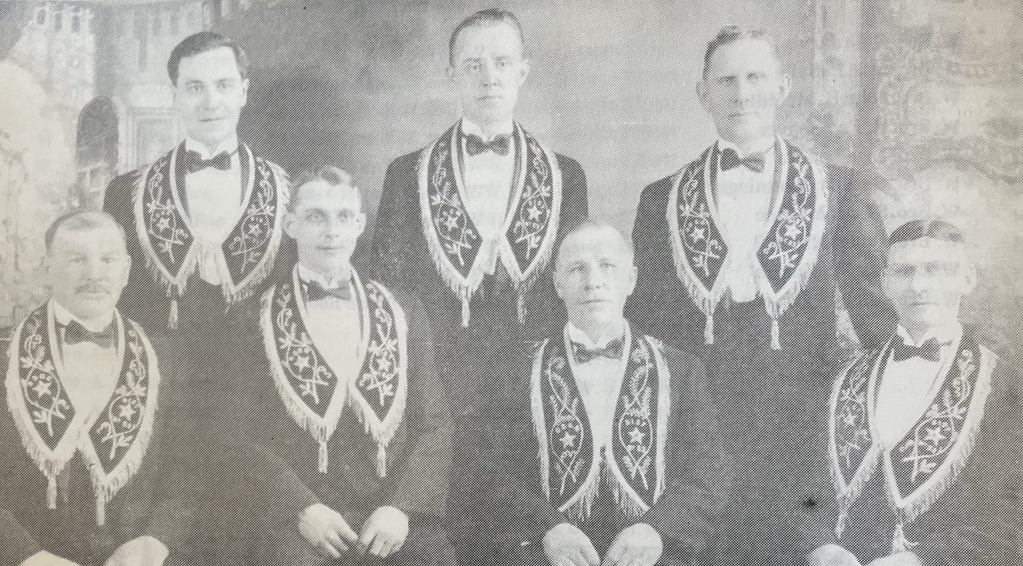
Chesterville Oddfellows in 1929: Geo. Brooks, Eric Casselman, Arth. Peake, Perley Boyd, Geo. Gillard, Milton Shaver, Dr. D.C. Seymour

- Chesterville Women's Institute: Established in 1902
- 1st Chesterville Troop of Boy Scouts: Established around 1912 by Joe Neville, the Chesterville Scouts thrived in the community, and even included a brass band. The Scouts sponsored the Chesterville Wolf Pack, and were supported by the Chesterville Rotary Club. The Chesterville Troop disbanded in 2000, but local Boy Scouts and Otters Troops continue in Winchester.
- Chesterville Troop of Girl Guides: Originally established in 1925 by Captain Leila McGee, the Girl Guides held weekly meetings and annual camps until the group died out in 1944. The 2nd Girl Guide Troop of Chesterville was established in 1972 under Captain Shelagh Derks. The 2nd Troop met weekly at St. Mary's School until the group once again disbanded. Currently the only Girl Guides Troop in the area is located in Winchester.

== Community events ==
- Chesterville Fair - Since 1932, the Chesterville and District Agricultural Society has held the annual Chesterville Fair in July or August, however an annual village fair and market has existed in some form since 1862. The fairgrounds include an exhibition hall, space for a midway, grandstands, baseball diamond, and horse barn. Fair exhibitions include a tractor pull, demolition derby, horse and cattle show, midway, and food and game trucks.
- Art on the Waterfront - Held annually in early June by the waterfront terrace since 2011, the festival showcases local artists, musicians, and dancers, as well as a farmer's market.
- Meet Me on Main Street - The festival was originally held in 2017 to honour the 150th anniversary of Confederation, but has since occurred annually in July across North Dundas, with festivals occurring in Chesterville, Winchester, Morewood, Hallville, and South Mountain. There is live entertainment, food and drink from local vendors, as well as craft breweries and distilleries.
- Rotary Duck Race - Held annually in the Spring by the Rotary Club, the Duck Race is a fundraising event to raise money for the club. Rubber ducks are purchased by ticket and released into the Nation River, floating downstream towards the dam. The first duck over the finish line wins the grand prize. "Duck draws" have also occurred in recent years.
- Remembrance Day - The community gathers annually to honour Remembrance Day on November 11 at the Chesterville Cenotaph. The parade, consisting of local veterans, soldiers, firefighters, police, and Legion members, marches from the funeral home to the cenotaph where a short ceremony occurs with the laying of wreathes. A social luncheon is held afterwards at the Chesterville Legion.
- Santa Claus Breakfast - Held in December by the Rotary Club, the breakfast rings in the Christmas season, complete with a Santa Claus for the kids.

== Education ==
=== Current schools ===
- St Mary Catholic School (JK-Grade 6): 67 Main Street South. St. Mary's Catholic School was originally built in 1903 as a red brick building consisting of two classrooms on the first level and a parish hall on the second level. From 1907 to 1972, the Sisters of Providence taught at the school. The original school was demolished in 1963 to make way for a larger, more modern school.
- Chesterville Public School (JK-Grade 6): 38 College Street. Chesterville Public School was founded in 1902. The original building was demolished in 1963 and a more modern school was built directly beside it. Happy Face Nursery School operates out of this location, offering the following programs: Toddler (18–30 months of age), Preschool (2.5–6 years of age), Kindergarten (6–8 years of age), and School Age (8–13 years of age).
- North Dundas District High School (Grades 7–12): 12835 County Road 43, Chesterville. North Dundas District High School was founded in 1963. Following a fire in 1962 that destroyed Winchester High School (founded 1914), the North Dundas District High School Board (later part of the SDG Board of Education, then the Upper Canada District School Board) built an amalgamated high school to service both Winchester and Chesterville, as well as the surrounding areas. As a consequence, Chesterville High School (founded 1911), was demolished in 1963. Due to declining enrolment, Maple Ridge Senior Elementary School closed in 2011 and the North Dundas Intermediate School was created for grades 7 and 8. The Intermediate School is located on the second floor of NDDHS.

=== Former schools ===
- Chesterville High School (formerly Chesterville Continuation School): The Chesterville Continuation School Board was established in the summer of 1910 and classes began that September. Until the school building on College Street was completed in fall 1911, classes were held at Chesterville Public School. The high school was located on College Street, directly south of the current public school. In January 1951, the Winchester and Chesterville High School Boards merged to create the North Dundas High School District Board, which included both villages and Winchester Township (except Morewood). By the 1950s, the school was becoming overcrowded. Because Winchester High School was having a similar issue, debates arose about whether each school should be renovated, or if one centralized school should be built. When a fire destroyed Winchester High School in February 1962, the board finally decided to build one school half-way between the two villages. This school later became North Dundas District High School. The Chesterville High School building was closed in June 1963 and was demolished soon after.
- Maple Ridge Senior Public School (formerly Maple Ridge Public School, formerly S.S. 6 (Maple Ridge) Public School): The original schoolhouse is located on the north side of County Road 43, directly west of Maple Ridge Cemetery. The Maple Ridge schoolhouse, like many others in the area, closed at the end of 1966 when a new, larger school was opened in 1967 on the south side of County Road 43 across from North Dundas District High School. Maple Ridge Public School absorbed students from a number of older local schoolhouses, including:
  - S.S. No. 2 (Cass Bridge)
  - S.S. No. 5 (Nation Valley)
  - S.S. No. 6 (Maple Ridge)
  - S.S. No. 8 (Forward)
  - S.S. No. 9 (Limerick)
  - S.S. No. 10 (Frood/Fruid)
  - S.S. No. 16 (Bethune Bush)
  - S.S. 18 (Boyne)
  - S.S. 20 (Summers).

Maple Ridge became a senior public school in 1973, amidst controversy about a large addition to the school. Due to declining enrollment, Maple Ridge closed in June 2011.

== Landmarks ==
=== Nestlé factory ===
In 1918, Nestlé opened its first Canadian milk plant in Chesterville and began operation as The Maple Leaf Condensed Milk Company. The factory operated in Chesterville until 2006, when it ceased operations.

=== Clock tower ===
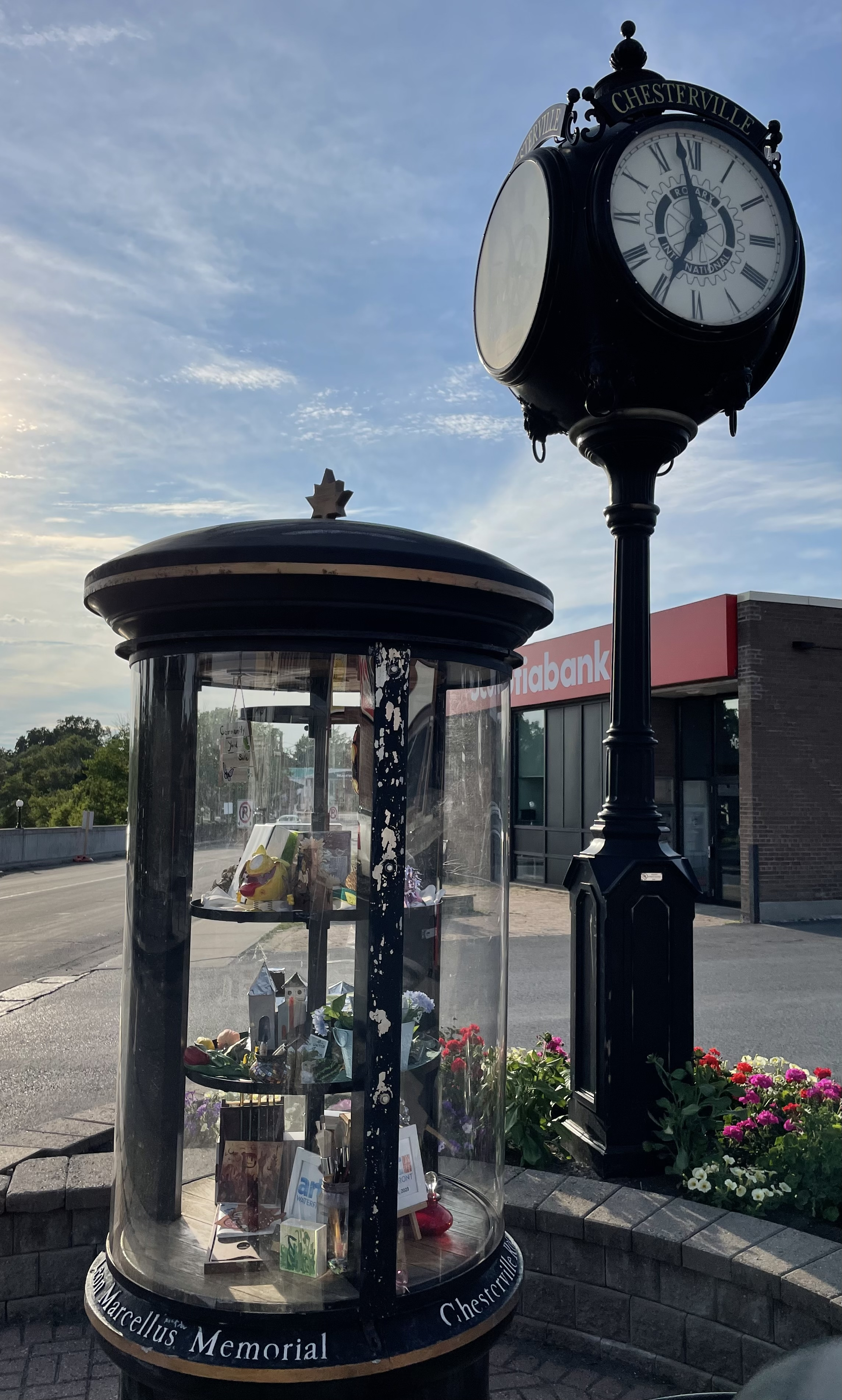
Chesterville clock tower

The Chesterville “clock tower” was unveiled on July 8, 2000, as part of a millennial project by the Rotary Club of Chesterville. It is located downtown at the intersection of Main and King streets. A kiosk stands beside the clock, built in honour of Leon Marcellus, a prominent Chesterville businessman, and hosts regular historical displays. The clock tower was refurbished in 2022.

=== Chesterville bridge ===
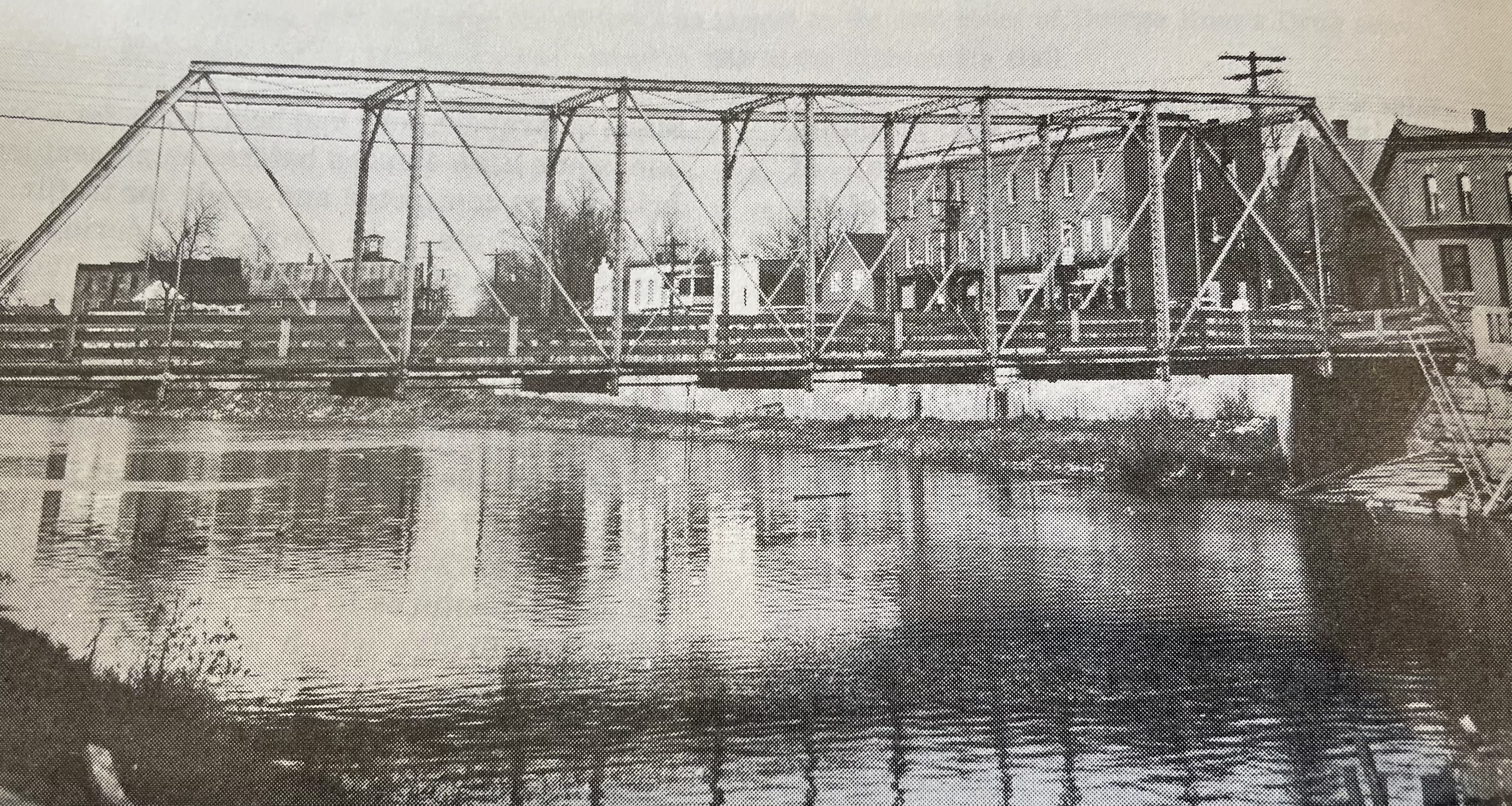
Iron Chesterville bridge that spanned the Nation River from 1888 to 1950

The old iron bridge, built in 1888 to cross the Nation River and connect both sides of town, was replaced by a larger concrete bridge on November 21, 1950, which remains to this day. The old iron bridge had replaced a smaller wooden one originally built in the 1840s. The current concrete bridge spans the river from behind the Community Centre across to the Gathering House and waterfront.

=== Churches ===
- Christ Church United (formerly Trinity United Church, formerly Trinity Methodist Church): The first Methodist congregation was established in Chesterville prior to 1852. Around 1875, a brick church was built on Water Street, behind the current church building, which was constructed in 1908 and opened in 1909. The old church remained vacant until at least 1928. On 10 June 1925, the Methodist Church of Canada merged with the Congregational Union of Canada and part of the Presbyterian Church of Canada to become the United Church of Canada. On that date, Trinity Methodist Church became Trinity United Church. The Morewood United Church congregation joined with Chesterville in 1966 to create the Chesterville-Morewood (later Morewood-Trinity) pastoral charge with one minister serving both churches. Following the sale of the Morewood United Church, the pastoral charge voted to change the name of Trinity United to Christ Church United in 2013.
- The Gathering House (formerly Discovery Bible Fellowship): Originally known as the Discovery Bible Fellowship, this congregation was established on Palm Sunday (27 March) 1994. Until 2010, services were held in the gym of Winchester Public School. That year, the church bought the Fulton Block (2 Water Street) in Chesterville after plans to construct a building south of Winchester fell through. Until renovations were completed in March 2011, the congregation met at St. Andrew's Presbyterian Church. The official opening of The Gathering House (which was renamed in early 2010) was held on 4 and 5 June 2011. The church also operates a café in the building.
- Nationside Pentecostal Church: A Pentecostal congregation was established in Chesterville in 1949 by Rev. Walter Perry. Services were originally held in school houses, then later in the Chesterville Library and various homes in the village. In 1952, a lot on Albert Street (now 13 Albert Street) previously owned by Melvin Durant & Son was purchased, and a church was erected on the site in 1954. The church closed briefly from the late 1960s to mid 1970s, but was revived in 1976 by George Prosser and Gunther Benjatschek, two Bible College students. In the fall of 2013, the congregation decided to sell the church building as it no longer met modern building standards. The following year, they moved to a space in the Maple Ridge Centre (formerly Maple Ridge Senior Public School) at 12820 County Road 43, west of Chesterville, where they remained until early 2019. When the Maple Ridge Centre was closed and sold, the congregation moved to the former Nestle Factory in the village, located at 171 Main Street North, where they remain today.
- St. Mary's Roman Catholic Church: Established and built in 1851, St Mary's is the oldest church building in the village. Earlier services had been offered in a log cabin south of the village. Chesterville became a separate parish from Morrisburg in 1882.
- St. Andrew's Presbyterian Church - Presbyterian services had been offered as early as the 1840s, with meetings being held in the log homes and later the Town Hall. In 1888 the current church was established and built.
- Holy Trinity Anglican Church - Built between 1879 and 1883, Trinity Anglican Church is located at 37 Queen Street. It is built on land donated by John Pliny Crysler. Prior to the construction of the church, Anglican services were held in the old town hall. In 2010, the church was sold and services moved to St Clare's Anglican Church in Winchester. Trinity Church is currently a private residence.

=== Murals ===
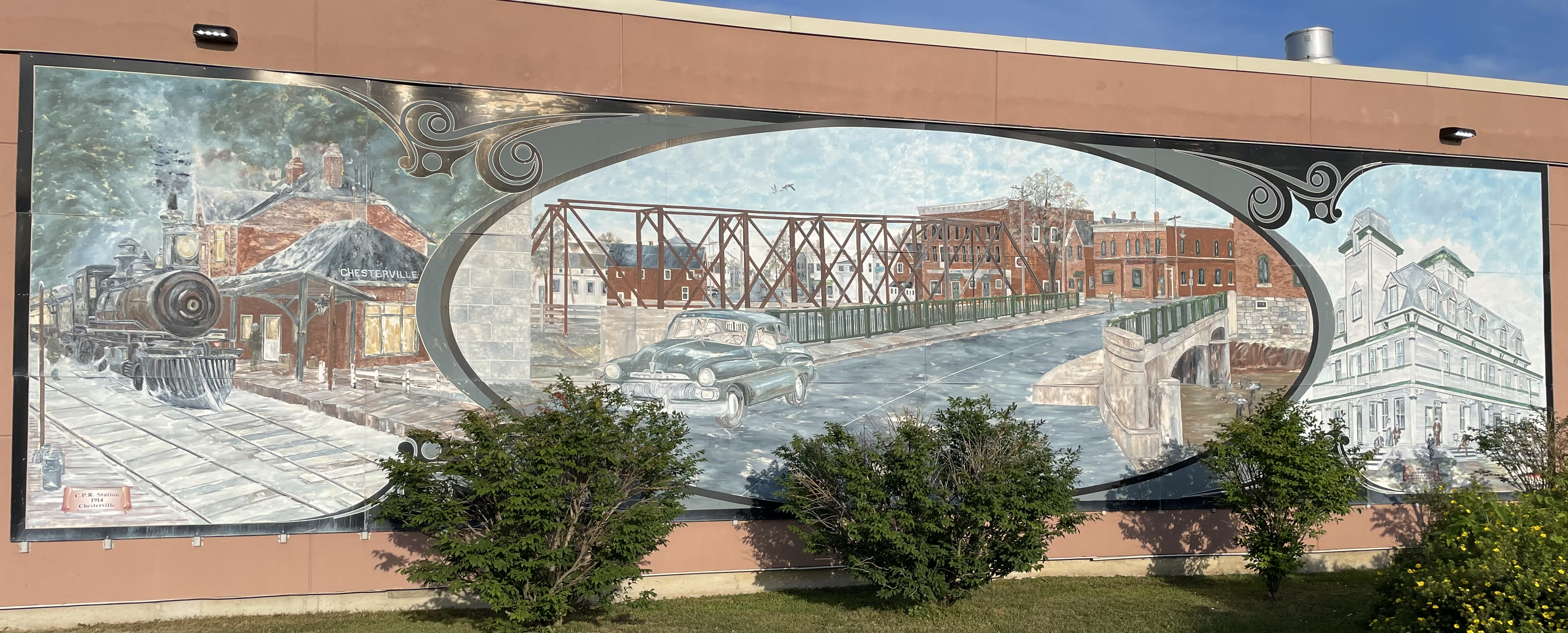
Chesterville Scotiabank mural

- Scotiabank Mural - In 2002, the Chesterville Lions Club unveiled an historic mural painted on the west side of the Scotiabank building in downtown Chesterville. The mural depicts the Chesterville C.P.R. Station in 1914, the opening of the new bridge in 1950, and the Old Temperance Hotel that was destroyed by fire in 1908. The mural was painted and provided by Marilyn St. Pierre and Sheldon Shane of Shane Signs.

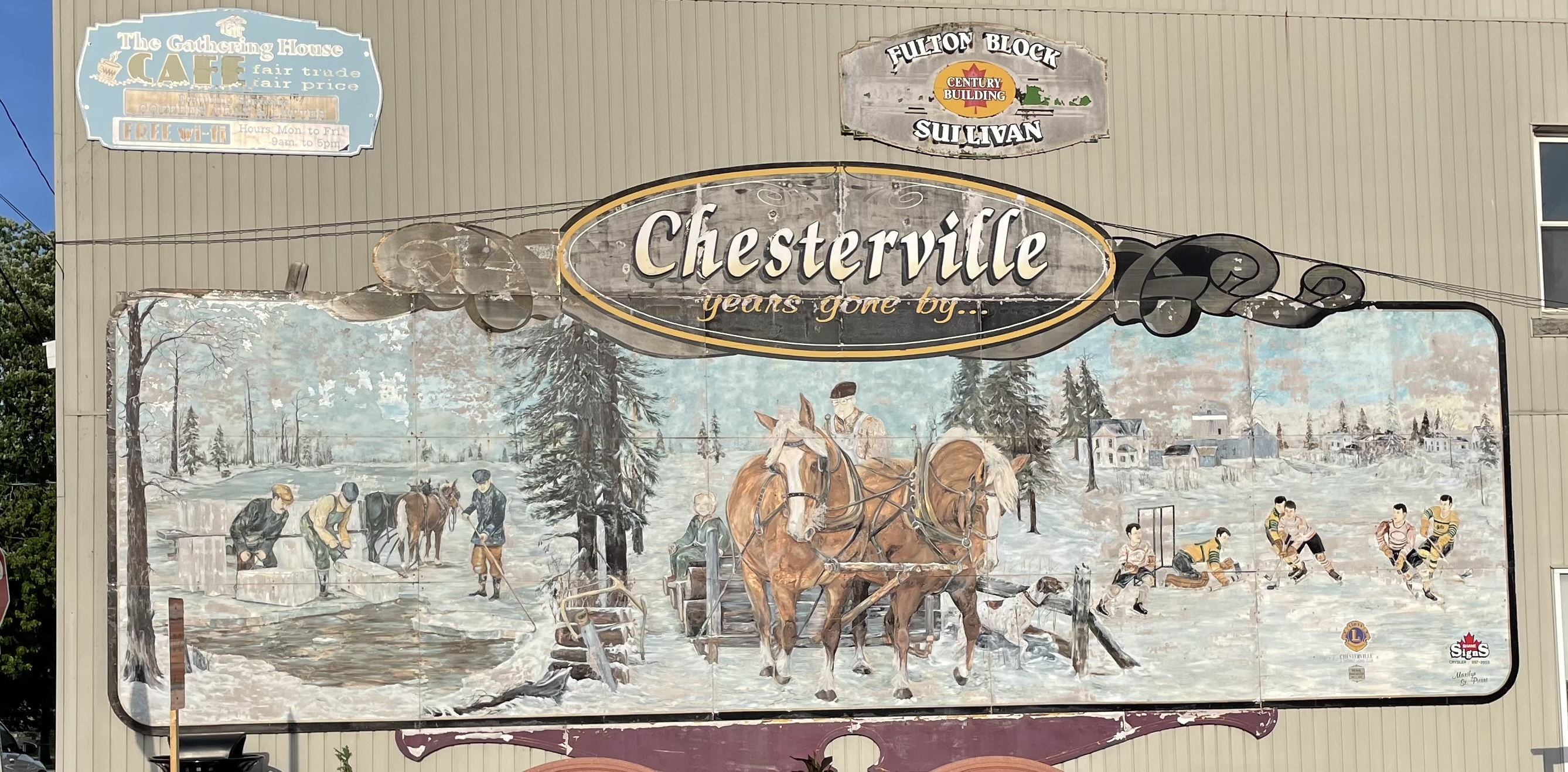
Chesterville “Years Gone By” mural

- ”Chesterville: Years Gone By” Mural - On May 6, 2006, the Chesterville Lions Club unveiled a second historic mural on the west side of the Gathering House at the bridge entrance. The mural depicts a winter scene in the village, with men cutting ice from the Nation River, and a game of Shinny. The mural is topped with “Chesterville: Years Gone By”. The mural was painted by Marilyn St. Pierre and provided by Shane Signs.

== Newspapers ==
- Chesterville Record (1894–present). The Chesterville Record is a weekly newspaper that was founded by Robert L. Harrop, the Chesterville station master. It was first published on December 12, 1894, and Thomas T. Shaw purchased the newspaper the following year. The Record office burned in the Great Fire of 1909 and was given a new home in 1910 when an office was built on King Street, where the business remained until 2018. T. T. Shaw sold the Record to George C. Lacey in 1915, who owned it until 1950. Lacey's daughter Helen, along with her husband Keith Graham, then became the co-publishers until they sold the newspaper to Blake Feeley and Wayne LaPrade in 1969. In 1976, the Record was sold to 2woMor Publications Inc., co-owned by brothers John and Robin Morris. Robin Morris eventually split from 2woMor Publications Inc. and established Etcetera Publications, under which he continued to publish the Chesterville Record. Robin Morris acted as editor of the Record for many years until his death on December 9, 2014. In August 2018, the newspaper was purchased by Linda Vogel, AJ Al-Rajab, and Donald Good. In June of that year, the business moved to 29 King Street and in December, the long-time office at 7 King Street was demolished.
- Eastern Ontario Agri-News (1978–present). Eastern Ontario Agri-News is a monthly tabloid published by Etcetera Publications (owner of the Chesterville Record). It was first published in late February 1978 by John and Robin Morris, who at the time were co-owners of 2woMor Publications Inc. When Robin Morris broke off from the company and established Etcetera Publications, he continued to publish Agri-News.
- Nation Valley News (2016–present). Nation Valley News is an all-digital news and advertising company founded and operated by Nelson Zandbergen.

== Notable people ==
- George Hummel Sr. (1802–1872), pioneer and founder of Chesterville, died in the village.
- Frances Marcella Capell (1849–1938), great-grandmother of actress Jane Fonda was born in Winchester Township near Chesterville in 1849 to Capt. John and Eliza Capell.
- Hudson Allison (1881–1912), Montreal stock-broker and victim of the Titanic disaster. He was born in Chesterville in 1881 and worked as a clerk in Chester Casselman's general store. His wife, Bess Waldo Daniels, and their daughter, Helen “Loraine”, also perished in the sinking. Their infant son, Hudson “Trevor” Allison, survived the sinking. Hudson's body was recovered by the Mackay-Bennett and interred at Maple Ridge Cemetery, Chesterville.
- J. T. Kearns (1858–1941), general store owner and gold miner who staked the Chesterville Gold Mine, lived in Chesterville.
- Long John Sorrell (1906–1984), professional hockey player and member of the NHL. He won the Stanley Cup in 1936 and 1937 playing with the Detroit Red Wings.
- Dewey Martin (1940–2009) of the rock band Buffalo Springfield was born in Chesterville in 1940.
- Kevin Gillis (1950-) tv writer and producer.

Politicians

- David Rae (1821-1899), prominent farmer and Reeve of Winchester Township, he served as Warden for the United Counties in 1870.
- Orren D. Casselman (1861–1950), MP for Dundas (1917–1921), was born in Chesterville. He was the half-brother of William H. Casselman (see below).
- William H. Casselman (1868–1941), MPP for Dundas (1919–1923). He was born in Chesterville and served as Reeve from 1931 until his death. He was the half-brother of Orren D. Casselman (see above).
- Preston Elliott (1876–1939), MP for Dundas (1921–1925), was born in Chesterville.
- Frederick McIntosh Cass (1913–2000), MPP for Grenville-Dundas (1955–1971), Minister of Highways (1959–1961), Minister of Municipal Affairs (1961–1962), Attorney-General of Ontario (1962–1964), and Speaker of the Legislative Assembly of Ontario (1968–1971), was born in Chesterville.
- George Holmes Challies (1884–1976), MPP for Dundas (1929–1934), buried in Maple Ridge Cemetery, Chesterville.

== See also ==
- North Dundas, Ontario
- Dundas County, Ontario
