= Maurice Bossy =

Canadian politician

Ontario MPP
- In office 1985–1990
- Preceded by: Andy Watson
- Succeeded by: Randy Hope
- Constituency: Chatham—Kent

Member of the Canadian Parliament for Kent
- In office 1980–1984
- Preceded by: John Robert Holmes
- Succeeded by: Elliott Hardey

Personal details
- Born: April 1, 1929 Orford, Ontario
- Died: November 29, 2008 (aged 79) Chatham, Ontario
- Party: Liberal
- Other political affiliations: Ontario Liberal Party
- Spouse: Margaret Lanckriet
- Children: 7
- Occupation: Farmer

Maurice Louis Bossy (April 1, 1929 – November 29, 2008) was a politician in Ontario, Canada. He was a Liberal member of the House of Commons of Canada from 1980 to 1984, and represented the Ontario Liberal Party in the Legislative Assembly of Ontario from 1985 to 1990.

== Background ==
Bossy was educated at Pain Court, Ontario, and worked for many years as a farmer, and a traveling fertilizer salesman for Canada Packers. He served on several Kent County School Boards in the late 1960s, and was also a member of the Royal Canadian Legion and Knights of Columbus, was active in RC Parish Council in both home parishes in Dresden and Chatham, performed as part of a local dance band specializing in polka music.

Bossy married Margaret Lanckriet in 1950 and together they raised 7 children.

== Federal politics ==
Bossy was elected to the House of Commons in the federal election of 1980, defeating Progressive Conservative incumbent Bob Holmes by 847 votes in the southwestern Ontario riding of Kent. He served as parliamentary secretary to the Minister of Supply and Services from March 1 to September 30, 1982, and to the Secretary of State for Canada from October 1, 1982, to February 29, 1984.

The Liberals were defeated in the 1984 federal election, and Bossy lost to Progressive Conservative Elliott Hardey by over 5,000 votes.

== Provincial politics ==
The following year, having been recruited by new provincial Liberal leader David Peterson, Bossy sought election for the Ontario Liberal Party in the riding of Chatham—Kent, and defeated incumbent Progressive Conservative Andy Watson by 1,134 votes. The Liberals formed a minority government after this election and Bossy was appointed as parliamentary assistant to the Minister of Housing in 1987. He was re-elected by an increased margin in the 1987 provincial election, in which Peterson's Liberals won a landslide majority.

The Liberals were defeated in the 1990 provincial election, and Bossy too, losing his legislative seat to New Democrat Randy Hope by almost 4,000 votes.

== Later life ==
In 1994, Bossy signed a petition calling for the introduction of an ethanol industry in Canada.
