= Andrew Naismith Watson =

Canadian politician

Andy Watson

Ontario MPP
- In office 1978–1985
- Preceded by: Darcy McKeough
- Succeeded by: Maurice Bossy
- Constituency: Chatham—Kent

Personal details
- Born: April 1, 1937 (age 87); Woodbridge, Ontario
- Political party: Progressive Conservative
- Occupation: Civil servant

Andrew Naismith (Andy) Watson (born April 1, 1937) is a former politician in Ontario, Canada. He served in the Legislative Assembly of Ontario from 1978 to 1985, as a member of the Progressive Conservative Party.

== Background ==
Watson was born in Woodbridge, Ontario. He graduated from Ontario Agricultural College at the University of Guelph in 1959, and became the OMAF assistant agricultural representative for Waterloo County later in the same year. He was transferred to Northumberland County in 1962, and became the agricultural representative for Kent County from 1968 to 1978.

== Politics ==
In 1978, Watson ran as served as the Progressive Conservative candidate in the riding of Chatham—Kent to replace former Progressive Conservative cabinet minister Darcy McKeough. He defeated Liberal Brian Gamble by 708 votes, and served in the legislature as a backbench supporter of Bill Davis's government. He was re-elected in 1981.

Although forty-two years in government, the Progressive Conservatives were reduced to a tenuous minority administration in the 1985 provincial election, and were subsequently defeated in the legislature. Watson lost the Chatham—Kent seat to Liberal Maurice Bossy by 1,134 votes.

== After politics ==
After his loss, Watson served from 1986 to 1994 as assistant commissioner for Ontario on the Canadian Grain Commission. He became farm director for CFCO radio in 1997, and was named to the Chatham-Kent Agricultural Hall of Fame in 2004. In 2010, Watson became the President of the Chatham Rotary Club and he operates a Christmas tree farm.
