= Chatham—Kent (provincial electoral district) =

Former provincial electoral district in Ontario, Canada

Chatham—Kent was a provincial electoral district (or riding) in Ontario, Canada. It existed from the 1967 election until it was abolished into Lambton—Kent—Middlesex and Chatham-Kent—Essex in 1998.

From the 1987 election until its abolishment in 1999 the riding included the (now former) municipalities of Dover Township, Chatham Township, Camden Township, Zone Township, the towns of Wallaceburg, Dresden and Bothwell plus the city of Chatham.

== Members ==
1. Darcy McKeough, Progressive Conservative (1967–1978)
2. Andrew Naismith Watson, Progressive Conservative (1978–1985)
3. Maurice Bossy, Liberal (1985–1990)
4. Randy Hope, New Democratic Party (1990–1995)
5. Jack Carroll, Progressive Conservative (1995–1999)

== Election results ==
1995 Ontario general election
| Party | Candidate | Votes | % | ±% |
|---|---|---|---|---|
| Progressive Conservative | Jack Carroll | 10,461 | 36.29 | +18.24 |
| Liberal | Mike Ferguson | 9,915 | 34.39 | +2.40 |
| New Democratic | Randy Hope | 7,444 | 25.82 | –18.91 |
| Family Coalition | David K. Edwards | 1,008 | 3.50 | –1.73 |
| Total valid votes | | 28,828 | 98.94 | |
| Total rejected, unmarked and declined ballots | | 308 | 1.06 | +0.19 |
| Turnout | | 29,136 | 58.54 | –4.47 |
| Eligible voters | | 49,769 | | |
| Progressive Conservative gain from New Democratic | | Swing | | +18.58 |
Source: Elections Ontario

1990 Ontario general election
| Party | Candidate | Votes | % | ±% |
|---|---|---|---|---|
| New Democratic | Randy Hope | 13,930 | 44.74 | +18.28 |
| Liberal | Maurice Bossy | 9,963 | 32.00 | –14.41 |
| Progressive Conservative | Charles Tomecek | 5,619 | 18.05 | –5.10 |
| Family Coalition | Mary (Marcy) Edwards | 1,626 | 5.22 | +2.42 |
| Total valid votes | | 31,138 | 99.13 | |
| Total rejected, unmarked and declined ballots | | 272 | 0.87 | +0.28 |
| Turnout | | 31,410 | 63.01 | +3.49 |
| Eligible voters | | 49,850 | | |
| New Democratic gain from Liberal | | Swing | | +16.34 |
Source: Elections Ontario

1987 Ontario general election
| Party | Candidate | Votes | % | ±% |
|---|---|---|---|---|
| Liberal | Maurice Bossy | 13,370 | 46.41 | +5.18 |
| New Democratic | Brian Rice | 7,623 | 26.46 | +4.39 |
| Progressive Conservative | Ron Anderson | 6,669 | 23.15 | –13.56 |
| Family Coalition | Mary (Marcy) Edwards | 806 | 2.80 | – |
| Independent | Don Carnegie | 341 | 1.18 | – |
| Total valid votes | | 28,809 | 99.42 | |
| Total rejected ballots | | 169 | 0.58 | +0.21 |
| Turnout | | 28,978 | 59.52 | +0.72 |
| Eligible voters | | 48,689 | | |
| Liberal hold | | Swing | | +0.40 |
Source: Elections Ontario

1985 Ontario general election
| Party | Candidate | Votes | % | ±% |
|---|---|---|---|---|
| Liberal | Maurice Bossy | 10,340 | 41.23 | +12.42 |
| Progressive Conservative | Andrew Naismith Watson | 9,206 | 36.71 | –5.49 |
| New Democratic | Ronald A. Franko | 5,535 | 22.07 | –6.93 |
| Total valid votes | | 25,081 | 99.63 | |
| Total rejected ballots | | 94 | 0.37 | –0.03 |
| Turnout | | 25,175 | 58.80 | +4.39 |
| Eligible voters | | 42,818 | | |
| Liberal gain from Progressive Conservative | | Swing | | +9.67 |
Source: Elections Ontario

1981 Ontario general election
| Party | Candidate | Votes | % | ±% |
|---|---|---|---|---|
| Progressive Conservative | Andrew Naismith Watson | 9,471 | 42.20 | +5.50 |
| New Democratic | Ronald A. Franko | 6,508 | 29.00 | –0.41 |
| Liberal | Darcy Want | 6,466 | 28.81 | –5.09 |
| Total valid votes | | 22,445 | 99.59 | |
| Total rejected ballots | | 92 | 0.41 | +0.23 |
| Turnout | | 22,537 | 54.41 | –8.27 |
| Eligible voters | | 41,424 | | |
| Progressive Conservative hold | | Swing | | +2.96 |
Source: Elections Ontario

Ontario provincial by-election, October 19, 1978 Resignation of Darcy McKeough
| Party | Candidate | Votes | % | ±% |
|---|---|---|---|---|
| Progressive Conservative | Andrew Naismith Watson | 9,296 | 36.70 | –9.78 |
| Liberal | Brian Gamble | 8,588 | 33.90 | +8.35 |
| New Democratic | Ronald A. Franko | 7,449 | 29.40 | +1.43 |
| Total valid votes | | 25,333 | 99.82 | |
| Total rejected ballots | | 45 | 0.18 | –0.17 |
| Turnout | | 25,378 | 62.68 | +3.40 |
| Eligible voters | | 40,491 | | |
| Progressive Conservative hold | | Swing | | –9.07 |
Source: Elections Ontario

1977 Ontario general election
| Party | Candidate | Votes | % | ±% |
|---|---|---|---|---|
| Progressive Conservative | Darcy McKeough | 10,769 | 46.48 | +2.75 |
| New Democratic | Ronald A. Franko | 6,482 | 27.98 | +3.29 |
| Liberal | Darrell Gall | 5,919 | 25.55 | –6.03 |
| Total valid votes | | 23,170 | 99.65 | |
| Total rejected ballots | | 81 | 0.35 | +0.05 |
| Turnout | | 23,251 | 59.28 | –2.30 |
| Eligible voters | | 39,222 | | |
| Progressive Conservative hold | | Swing | | –0.27 |
Source: Elections Ontario

1975 Ontario general election
| Party | Candidate | Votes | % | ±% |
|---|---|---|---|---|
| Progressive Conservative | Darcy McKeough | 10,146 | 43.73 | –4.81 |
| Liberal | James L. Cooke | 7,327 | 31.58 | –7.06 |
| New Democratic | Ronald A. Franko | 5,728 | 24.69 | +11.87 |
| Total valid votes | | 23,201 | 99.70 | |
| Total rejected ballots | | 69 | 0.30 | –0.51 |
| Turnout | | 23,270 | 61.58 | –3.51 |
| Eligible voters | | 37,789 | | |
| Progressive Conservative hold | | Swing | | +1.13 |
Source: Elections Ontario

1971 Ontario general election
| Party | Candidate | Votes | % | ±% |
|---|---|---|---|---|
| Progressive Conservative | Darcy McKeough | 10,827 | 48.54 | +0.36 |
| Liberal | Donald D. McGeorge | 8,619 | 38.64 | –1.69 |
| New Democratic | Leroy B. Wright | 2,859 | 12.82 | +1.33 |
| Total valid votes | | 22,305 | 99.20 | |
| Total rejected ballots | | 181 | 0.80 | –0.05 |
| Turnout | | 22,486 | 65.09 | +4.51 |
| Eligible voters | | 34,546 | | |
| Progressive Conservative hold | | Swing | | +1.03 |
Source: Elections Ontario

1967 Ontario general election
| Party | Candidate | Votes | % | ±% |
|---|---|---|---|---|
| Progressive Conservative | Darcy McKeough | 8,575 | 48.18 | – |
| Liberal | Tom Henry | 7,179 | 40.34 | – |
| New Democratic | Paul Seagrave | 2,044 | 11.48 | – |
| Total valid votes | | 17,798 | 99.15 | |
| Total rejected ballots | | 153 | 0.85 | – |
| Turnout | | 17,951 | 60.58 | – |
| Eligible voters | | 29,633 | | |
| Progressive Conservative pickup new district. | | | | |
Source: Elections Ontario

== See also ==
- List of Ontario provincial electoral districts
- Canadian provincial electoral districts
