= Randy Hope =

Canadian politician

Mayor of Chatham-Kent, Ontario
- In office 2006 – November 30, 2018
- Preceded by: Diane Gagner
- Succeeded by: Darrin Canniff

Ontario MPP
- In office 1990–1995
- Preceded by: Maurice Bossy
- Succeeded by: Jack Carroll
- Constituency: Chatham—Kent

Personal details
- Born: 1959 (age 66–67) Kent County, Ontario
- Party: New Democratic Party
- Occupation: Labour executive

Randy R. Hope (born c. 1959) is a politician in Ontario, Canada. He was the mayor of the Municipality of Chatham-Kent, Ontario from 2006 to 2018. He also served as a New Democratic Party member of the Legislative Assembly of Ontario from 1990 to 1995.

== Background ==
Hope was involved in the labour movement before entering political life. He served as a plant worker at Rockwell International, and was president of the Canadian Auto Workers Local 1941 in Tilbury, Ontario from 1985 to 1990. He also served as president of the Chatham and District Labour Council from 1988 to 1990, and was an area coordinator of the Coalition for Social Justice.

== Provincial politics ==
Hope was elected to the Ontario legislature in the 1990 provincial election. He defeated Maurice Bossy, the Liberal Party incumbent, by almost 4,000 votes in Chatham—Kent. The NDP won a majority government and Hope served as a parliamentary assistant to the Minister of Community and Social Services from 1990 to 1995. In March 1995, he announced a government grant of $2.9 million in Kent County. Hope also supported the domestic production of ethanol during his time in government.

In the 1995 provincial election Hope was defeated finishing third behind winner Progressive Conservative Jack Carroll.

== Municipal politics ==
In 2006, Hope was elected mayor of the Municipality of Chatham-Kent, Ontario. He was re-elected in 2010. He was defeated in the 2018 municipal election, finishing a distant third behind one-term Ward 6 (Chatham) councillor, Darrin Canniff and newcomer Alysson Storey. He garnered 14% of the vote.

In July, 2026, Hope has filed to be elected again as mayor of Chatham-Kent as a part of the 2026 Municipal Election. Hope will compete against other candidates such as current mayor Darrin Canniff and Michael Bondy.

On October 26th, 2026, Randy Hope was not to be re-elected as Mayor of Chatham-Kent. Randy Hope scored 2,818 marking 7.7% of votes. Micheal Bondy took the crown of being Chatham-Kent's next Mayor for the 2026-2030 period.
