= Dalton Bales =

Canadian politician (1920–1979)

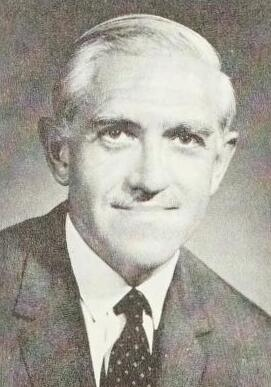
- Bales, c. 1971

Ontario MPP
- In office 1963–1975
- Preceded by: New riding
- Succeeded by: Bette Stephenson
- Constituency: York Mills

Personal details
- Born: February 21, 1920 Lansing, Ontario
- Died: October 31, 1979 (aged 59) Toronto, Ontario
- Party: Progressive Conservative
- Spouse: Iris Vivian Amundsen
- Children: 2
- Occupation: Lawyer

Dalton Arthur Bales (February 21, 1920 – October 30, 1979) was a politician in Ontario, Canada. He was a Progressive Conservative member of the Legislative Assembly of Ontario from 1963 to 1975 who represented the riding of York Mills. He was a cabinet minister in the governments of John Robarts and Bill Davis.

== Background ==
Bales joined the Toronto law firm of McLaughlin, Soward in 1946 while he was a law student. He was called to the bar in 1949 and eventually became partner.

== Politics ==
He entered politics in 1958 by being elected to the North York Town Council as an alderman. He defeated Paul Graham in Ward 2 by 780 votes. He was re-elected in 1960.

In 1963, he ran as the Progressive Conservative candidate in the riding of York Mills. He defeated Liberal James Service by 8,351 votes. He was a major organizer in the Toronto area where the party won 22 seats. He was re-elected in 1967 and 1971.

In 1966 he was appointed Minister of Labour in the government of Premier John Robarts. In 1971, Bill Davis appointed him Minister of Municipal Affairs. In 1972 he was promoted to Attorney General of Ontario.

In 1972, Bales and several other cabinet ministers were accused of being in a conflict of interest over property they owned. In Bales' case he was accused of having purchased land in Markham, Ontario in 1969 while the Cabinet was considering development plans in the area. Bales offered to resign from cabinet but his resignation was refused. The incidents resulted in Davis issuing the province's first conflict of interest guidelines for cabinet ministers and later parliamentary assistants to follow.

He was dropped from cabinet in 1974 during a major cabinet shuffle. Bales cited declining health and a minor heart attack in 1973 as the reasons for requesting a reduction in his responsibilities. He left politics the next year to return to his legal practice.

=== Cabinet posts ===
Davis ministry, Province of Ontario (1971–1985)
Cabinet posts (2)
Predecessor	Office	Successor
Allan Lawrence	Attorney General; 1972–1974; Minister of Justice February–April 1972	Bob Welch
Darcy McKeough	Minister of Municipal Affairs; 1971–1972	Darcy McKeough
Robarts ministry, Province of Ontario (1961–1971)
Cabinet post (1)
Predecessor	Office	Successor
Leslie Rowntree	Minister of Labour; 1966–1971	Gordon Carton

== Later life ==
Bales died at the age of 59 when he was struck by a car while attempting to cross Bayview Avenue in Toronto.
