= Jack Carroll (politician) =

Canadian politician

Ontario MPP
- In office 1995–1999
- Preceded by: Randy Hope
- Succeeded by: riding dissolved
- Constituency: Chatham—Kent

Personal details
- Born: November 9, 1942 (age 83) Peterborough, Ontario
- Party: Progressive Conservative
- Occupation: Teacher

Jack Carroll (born November 9, 1942) is a former politician in Ontario, Canada. He was a Progressive Conservative member of the Legislative Assembly of Ontario from 1995 to 1999.

== Background ==
Carroll was educated at the University of Toronto, and worked as a high school teacher. He also served as an executive of General Motors of Canada Ltd., and owned a car dealership.

== Politics ==
In the 1995 provincial election, Carroll was elected in the riding of Chatham—Kent over Liberal Mike Ferguson by 546 votes and New Democrat incumbent Randy Hope. He served as a backbench supporter of Mike Harris's government for the next four years, and was a parliamentary assistant from 1996 to 1999.

In 1996, the Harris government reduced the number of provincial ridings from 130 to 103. Several sitting MPPs were forced to run against one another, and Carroll was defeated by Liberal MPP Pat Hoy by 8,001 votes in the new riding of Chatham-Kent—Essex. During the election, the national media reported an extremely large demonstration against the Progressive Conservative government in Chatham.

Carroll supported the Reform Party at the federal level in the 1990s, and endorsed Tom Long's bid to lead the Canadian Alliance in 2000.

Roles

- Parliamentary Assistant to the Minister of Community and Social Services (January 8, 1996 — June 2, 1999)
- Member, Standing Committee on Social Development (January 20, 1997 — April 23, 1998; May 4, 1998 — April 22, 1999; April 29, 1999 — May 05, 1999)
- Member and Chair, Standing Committee on General Government (November 2, 1995 — January 20, 1997)
- Member, Standing Committee on Resources Development (November 2, 1995 — January 20, 1997)
