= Darcy McKeough =

Canadian politician (1933–2023)

Darcy McKeough OC
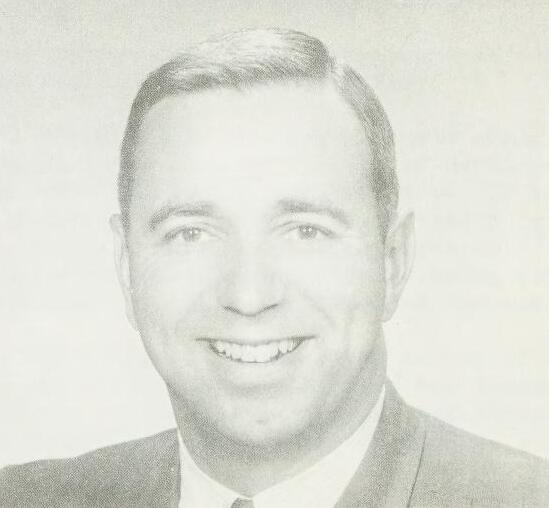
- McKeough, c. 1967

Member of the Legislative Assembly of Ontario
- In office 1963–1967
- Preceded by: George Parry
- Succeeded by: Riding abolished
- Constituency: Kent West
- In office 1967–1978
- Preceded by: Riding established
- Succeeded by: Andy Watson
- Constituency: Chatham—Kent

Minister without portfolio
- In office 1966–1967
- Premier: John Robarts

Minister of Municipal Affairs
- In office 1967–1971
- Premier: John Robarts
- Preceded by: Wilf Spooner
- Succeeded by: Dalton Bales

Treasurer of Ontario
- In office 1971–1972
- Premier: Bill Davis
- Preceded by: Charles MacNaughton
- Succeeded by: Charles MacNaughton
- In office 1975–1978
- Premier: Bill Davis
- Preceded by: John White
- Succeeded by: Frank Miller

Minister of Intergovernmental Affairs
- In office April 1972 – September 1972
- Premier: Bill Davis
- Preceded by: Position established
- Succeeded by: Charles MacNaughton
- In office 1975–1978
- Premier: Bill Davis
- Preceded by: John White
- Succeeded by: Frank Miller

Minister of Municipal Affairs
- In office February 1972 – September 1972
- Premier: Bill Davis
- Preceded by: Dalton Bales
- Succeeded by: Bob Welch

Minister of Energy
- In office 1973–1975
- Premier: Bill Davis
- Preceded by: Position established
- Succeeded by: Dennis Timbrell

Personal details
- Born: January 31, 1933 Chatham, Ontario, Canada
- Died: November 29, 2023 (aged 90)
- Party: Progressive Conservative
- Occupation: Businessman

William Darcy McKeough OC (January 31, 1933 – November 29, 2023) was a Canadian politician in Ontario. He was a Progressive Conservative member of the Legislative Assembly of Ontario from 1963 to 1978 who represented the ridings of Kent West and Chatham—Kent. He was a cabinet minister in the governments of John Robarts and Bill Davis. Due to McKeough's senior position in cabinet as Treasurer, Minister of Economics and Intergovernmental Affairs and Minister of Municipal Affairs, he was often referred to as the 'Duke of Kent'.

After he retired from politics in 1978, McKeough spent a further career in business administering his companies McKeough Investments and McKeough Supply. He also spent time as a member of the board of Hydro One and was CEO of Union Gas.

== Background ==
Born in Chatham, Ontario and educated at Ridley College in St. Catharines, Canada. After which received a Bachelor of Arts degree from the University of Western Ontario in 1954.

== Politics ==
From 1960 to 1961 and 1962 to 1963, McKeough was a member of the Chatham City Council.

In the 1963 provincial election, McKeough ran as the Progressive Conservative candidate in the southwestern Ontario riding of Kent West. He defeated Liberal candidate G.R. Newkirk by 1,739 votes. In 1967, he ran in the new riding of Chatham—Kent and defeated Liberal Tom Henry by 1,291 votes. He was re-elected in 1971, 1975 and 1977.

In 1966, McKeough was appointed to cabinet as a Minister without portfolio by Premier John Robarts. In 1967 he was promoted to Minister of Municipal Affairs after the previous minister, Wilf Spooner was defeated in the 1967 election. Among other things, he introduced legislation to create the city of Thunder Bay in Northern Ontario by an amalgamation of existing municipalities.

In 1971, McKeough entered the leadership race to replace Robarts who retired in December 1970. He was viewed as a compromise candidate between front runner Bill Davis and contender Allan Lawrence. He placed third in the contest which was won by Davis. After McKeough dropped out he endorsed Davis which was seen as a key move in Davis's narrow victory. In return, Davis appointed McKeough to the senior cabinet post of Treasurer of Ontario and Minister of Economics.

In September 1972, McKeough resigned from cabinet when it was revealed in a story by The Globe and Mail that he was involved in a conflict of interest when, as Minister of Municipal Affairs, his ministry had approved a housing development in which he was financially involved. In his resignation announcement, McKeough claimed he had done nothing wrong but felt that he could no longer continue in his position when his credibility would be continually questioned.

In 1973, McKeough was returned to cabinet as Minister of Energy. In January 1975, he was restored to the posts of Treasurer and Minister of Economics and Intergovernmental Affairs. In August 1978 he retired from politics.

== Later life and death ==
After leaving political office in 1978, McKeough returned to the private sector and has had a number of positions, particularly in the energy sector. In 1994, he was made an Officer of the Order of Canada for his "successful business ventures and fund-raising efforts on behalf of educational, medical, research and cultural institutions".

McKeough died from complications of pneumonia on November 29, 2023, at the age of 90.
