= George Hummel (pioneer) =

George Hummel Sr.
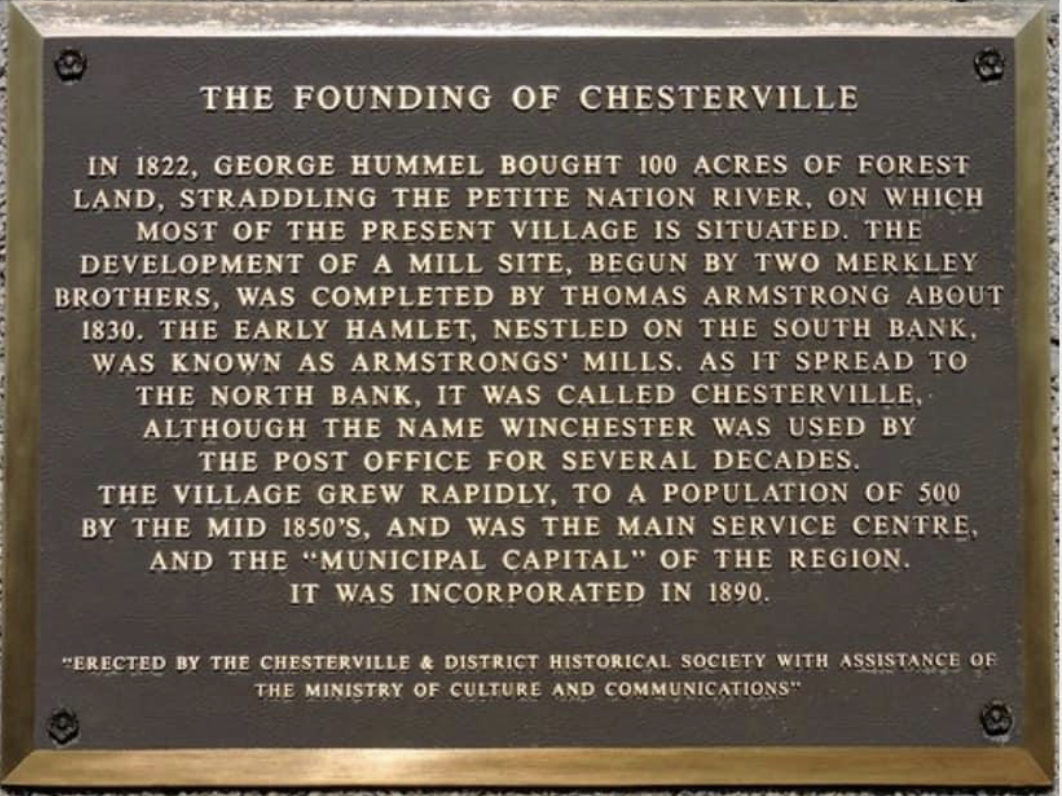
- Plaque commemorating Hummel and the founding of Chesterville
- Born: c. 1795; Pennsylvania, United States
- Died: c.1872 Chesterville, Winchester Township, Ontario, Canada
- Occupations: Miller, pioneer, hunter, fisherman, militiaman
- Known for: Early pioneer and founder of Chesterville
- Military Service
- Allegiance: Upper Canada
- Branch: Canadian Militia
- Service years: 1828-58
- Rank: Private; Lieutenant
- Units: 1st Dundas Militia; 4th (Winchester) Dundas Militia
- Conflicts: Rebellion of 1838

George Hummel Sr. (also spelt Hummell) (c. 1795 – c. 1872) was a miller and early pioneer in Upper Canada, establishing a settlement that would eventually become the village of Chesterville.

== Early life ==
Hummel was born circa 1795 in Pennsylvania to a German American family. The family settled in Orwigsburg in the early 1810s, but in the early 1820s George immigrated to Upper Canada, settling in Williamsburg, Dundas County.

=== Family ===
George Hummel Sr. married Rebecca Merkley (1798-1861) on April 3, 1821, in Williamsburg. She was the daughter of Frederich Merkley (1756-1816) and Catherina Schell (1772-1851).

The couple had the following children in Williamsburg and Chesterville:

- George Adam Hummel Jr. (1821-1901)
- Levi Hummel (1823-1891)
- Simon Hummel (1825-1906)
- Catherine Hummel (1826-1911)
- Maria Hummel (1832-1884)
- Rebecca Hummel (1835-)
- Amos Hummel (1840-1875)
- John Hummel (1840-1915)
- Herman Hummel (1845-1915)
- William Hummel (1846-1889)

Three of his great-great-grandsons from Chesterville would served during the First World War and would be killed in action:

- Private Arthur Meharey Hummel (1891-1917), P.P.C.L.I. - Killed at the Second Battle of Passchendaele
- Private Charles "Clifford" Hummel (1891-1918), 46th Battalion - Killed at the Battle of the Scarpe
- Lieutenant Wilfred Ellis Durant (1895-1918), No. 29 Squadron RAF - Killed near RAF HQ, Saint-Omer

== Pioneer ==
Around 1822/1823, Hummel purchased the west half of Lot 18 in the unsettled Township of Winchester from the estate of Marianne Duncan, daughter of Richard Duncan. He established a mill site along the South Nation River and in 1825 sold part of his land to two Merkley brothers who attempted to erect a mill.

The Merkley brothers drowned while transporting supplies upriver and Hummel soon sold the land to Thomas Armstrong and his son who, in 1828, erected a sawmill and grist mill. The mills attracted many further settlers, and by 1838 the small settlement founded by Hummel and Armstrong had grown and was known as Armstrong's Mills or Hummelville. In 1845 a post office was established under the name of Winchester, but in 1875 the village was renamed Chesterville. Much of the land Hummel initially purchased was eventually sold off to pioneering settlers, often for a low price, and the land on which the Chesterville Community Hall currently stands was once sold by him for a "single barrel of whiskey".

Hummel's original house on Mill Street was one of the best built in Dundas, and the loft of the farmhouse was often used for early political meetings. The house still stands in the village but has since been refurbished.

== Later life ==
Hummel raised a large family in Chesterville, and was a hunter and fisherman of renown. Many Hummel descendants still live in the Chesterville area.

George Hummel joined the Dundas Militia in the 1820s and is listed with his son George Jr in Captain Jacob Merkley’s (Winchester) Company of the 1st Dundas Militia in December 1837. He is listed as a private in the same company during the Rebellion of 1838, stationed at Fort Wellington, Prescott, from November 13, 1838 until April 1839. When the 4th (Winchester) Battalion, Dundas Militia was created in 1852, it was headquartered in Chesterville and Hummel was appointed an ensign. In December 1855, he was promoted to lieutenant in the battalion. He resigned from the militia due to his age in March 1858. His sons Harman and John served as privates in the Service Company of the 4th Winchester Militia in 1862 following the Trent Affair.

Hummel served as president for the Winchester Branch of the Montreal Auxiliary Bible Society. The branch was formed in February 1845.

George Hummel Sr. died in Chesterville after 1871, possibly in 1872, and is buried in the Hummel Cemetery along the banks of the Nation River.
