= J. T. Kearns =

Canadian mine owner

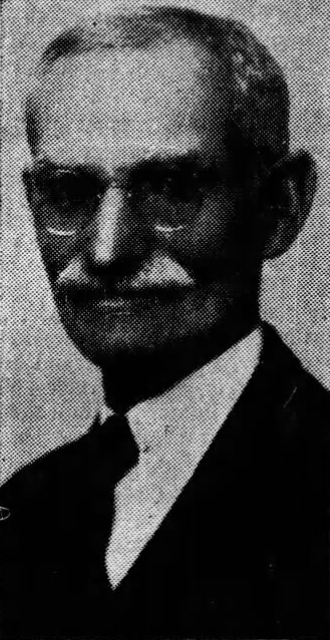
- Born: c. 1858; Finch
- Died: May 26, 1941; Montreal
- Occupations: Shop keeper, mine owner
- Organization: Chesterfield Larder Lake Gold Mining Company
- Known for: Co-founding Chesterville gold mine

Jeremiah (Jerry) T. Kearns (c.1858-May 26, 1941) was a Canadian general store keeper who co-founded the Chesterville gold mine.

Kearns was born in Finch, Ontario and relocated to Chesterville where he ran the townships general store. In 1906, he was part of a group of prospectors who discovered gold and co-founded Chesterfield Larder Lake Gold Mining Company. Financial and logistical challenges delayed his group from opening a gold mine until 1939.

Kearns died in Montreal in 1941, and the community of Kearns in McGarry, Ontario is named after him.

== Family life ==
Kearns was born in Finch Township, Ontario and relocated to Chesterville in 1888.

Kearns and his wife had three sons. Leo. J. Kearns grew up to take over the family mining business, Hulbert Kearns studied medicine at McGill University and became a physician in Detroit, Walter Patrick Kearns died in 1922 aged 29.

== Career ==
In Chesterville, Kearns operated the general store and served on the village council from 1917 to 1918.

In 1906, Herman Hummel, Jesse Elliot, Wesley Barkley and Kearns went prospecting for gold near Lake Present in Ontario. Hummel spotted a white crystal in a rock and with Kearns removed it from a cliff face and broke it open to discovered gold. Staking claim T. 1,860 was officially registered in Kearn's name. The group informally renamed Lake Present (as it was known to Indigenous peoples) as Larder Lake. The group incorporated the Chesterfield Larder Lake Gold Mining Company on March 20, 1907.

The company struggled to raise finances and initially used their land as a muskrat farm. In 1937 they raised sufficient financing to open the Chesterville gold mine. Kearns became the treasurer of the company when it became more active.

== Retirement, death and legacy ==
After retiring from shop keeping, Kearns and his wife relocated to Toronto.

Kearns died in hospital in Montreal on May 26, 1941, aged 83 or 84. The community of Kearns in McGarry township, Ontario is named after him.
