= Chatham-Kent Municipal Council =

Municipal governing body in Ontario, Canada

Chatham-Kent Municipal Council is the governing body of the Municipality of Chatham-Kent in southwestern Ontario, Canada.

The municipality is divided into six wards. Each ward elects a different number of members to council.

== Current members ==
Elected in the 2022 municipal election

| Position | Representative(s) |
|---|---|
| Mayor | Darrin Canniff |
| Ward 1 - West Kent | Lauren Anderson |
| Ward 1 - West Kent | Melissa Harrigan |
| Ward 2 - South Kent | |
| Ward 2 - South Kent | Anthony Ceccacci |
| Ward 2 - South Kent | Ryan Doyle |
| Ward 2 - South Kent | Trevor Thompson |
| Ward 3 - East Kent | Morena McDonald (Note: Appointed after the resignation of Steve Pinnsonneault. She was appointed due to getting 3rd place in the last municipal election. Motions for a by-election were rejected by the majority of council.) |
| Ward 3 - East Kent | John Wright |
| Ward 4 - North Kent | Rhonda Jubenville |
| Ward 4 - North Kent | Jamie McGrail |
| Ward 5 - Wallaceburg | Aaron Hall |
| Ward 5 - Wallaceburg | Carmen McGregor |
| Ward 6 - Chatham | Michael Bondy |
| Ward 6 - Chatham | Marjorie Crew |
| Ward 6 - Chatham | Amy Finn |
| Ward 6 - Chatham | Conor Allin |
| Ward 6 - Chatham | Brock McGregor |
| Ward 6 - Chatham | Alysson Storey |
