= North Dundas District High School =

Location
- 12835 County Road 43; Chesterville, Ontario, K0C 1H0; Canada; 45.09188°N 75.28735°W

Information
- School type: Public
- Motto: Doctrina Arte Coniuncta (Learning Combined with Art)
- Founded: 1963
- School board: UCDSB
- Principal: Michael Deighton
- Grades: 7-12
- Enrollment: Approx. 500
- Language: English, French, Latin
- Area: North Dundas
- Colours: White, Navy Blue
- Team name: North Dundas Devils
- Website: northdundas.ucdsb.on.ca

North Dundas District High School (NDDHS) is a high school located in Chesterville, Ontario, Canada. It is part of the Upper Canada District School Board along with 78 other Ontario schools. It features grades 7 through 12 and has approximately 500 students. However, this number is expected to go down, as a decline in enrolment has been seen.

== History ==
It is located in Maple Ridge as a compromise between the villages of Winchester and Chesterville, both of which wanted the new high school and each had a smaller high school prior to its construction. There were talks of consolidating the two high schools for years, but a fire at Winchester High School in the winter of 1962 pushed councillors to vote on building the new school. They built it on what was formerly farmland belonging to Bert Fulton, a local farmer.

== Notable alumni ==
- Francine Villeneuve, retired thoroughbred jockey and racing pioneer
- Eric Duncan, MP for Stormont-Dundas-South Glengarry

== See also ==
- Education in Ontario
- List of secondary schools in Ontario
- Seaway District High School
