= Pain Court =

Community in Ontario, Canada

- Unincorporated community
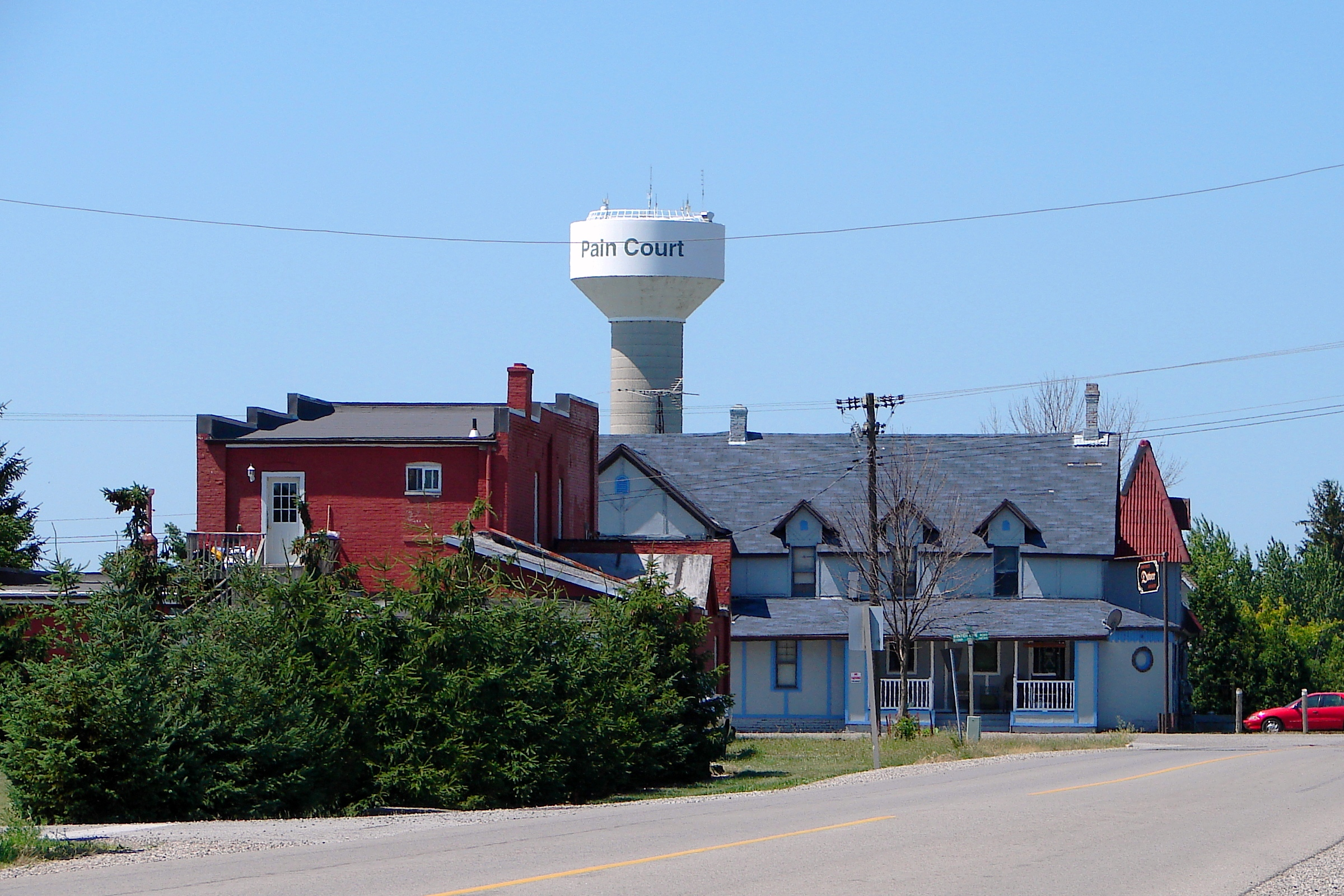

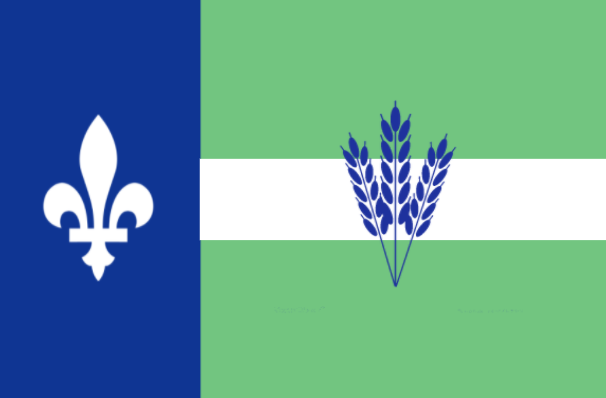
- Flag

- Location within Municipality of Chatham-Kent Location within Southern Ontario
- Coordinates: 42°24′35″N 82°18′30″W
- Country: Canada
- Province: Ontario
- Municipality: Chatham-Kent
- Settled: 1780s
- Time zone: UTC-5 (EST)
  - Summer (DST): UTC-4 (EDT)
- Forward sortation area: N0P 1Z0
- Area codes: 519 and 226
- NTS Map: 040J08
- GNBC Code: FDISB

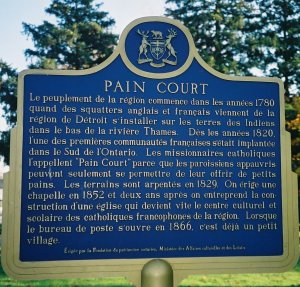
A commemorative plaque in the village

Pain Court is a historically French-speaking agricultural village in southwestern Ontario, Canada, in the municipality of Chatham-Kent. It was established in 1854, as one of the earliest French-speaking settlements in southern Ontario. Pain Court was founded when English and French-speaking squatters from the Detroit, Michigan, area began to settle the indigenous lands along the lower Thames River in the region in the 1780s. It derived its name from the small loaves of bread which the impoverished parishioners offered to Roman Catholic missionaries.

== History ==
By the 1820s in the nearby "Pain Court Block", one of the earliest French-speaking (Franco-Ontarian) communities in southern Ontario had developed. Named Pain Court (literally meaning "short bread") by Catholic missionaries in reference to the small loaves of bread which was all the impoverished parishioners could offer, the settlement was surveyed in 1829. In 1852, a chapel was built and two years later construction of a church commenced. It quickly became the cultural and educational centre of French-speaking Catholics in the area. By 1866, a small village had developed. After a post office was established, government officials renamed the area Dover South. Local residents refused to call it by that name, even sending and receiving mail under the name Pain Court. In 1911, priest Alfred Emery campaigned the federal government to allow the community to be formally recognized as Pain Court again. His efforts succeeded.

In 1899, Dover Hotel was built. The hotel was situated near a railway line and therefore attracted travellers. It later served as a residential property before its demolition in 2021.

Formerly within Dover Township of Kent County, in 1998 the area became part of the new Municipality of Chatham-Kent.

Located in Pain Court, Laprise Farms Limited has become the largest producer of brussels sprouts in Canada as of 1998.

Along with the annual Pain Court Truck and Tractor Pull, the community hosted the 2018 International Plowing Match.

== Education ==
The Conseil scolaire catholique Providence (CSC) operates Francophone Catholic schools serving the community. It maintains its Chatham-Kent regional office in Pain Court.

Pain Court has an elementary and a secondary French-language (francophone) school. École Sainte-Catherine is a small elementary school located directly across the street from its sister school, École secondaire de Pain Court, a small high school with 270 students.

== Wildlife ==
Just west of Pain Court, on the shores of Lake St. Clair, an Environment Canada National Wildlife Area (St. Clair NWA) provides a variety of migrating birds with wetland habitat of international importance. It is one of only 51 such sites in Canada.

== Notable persons ==
- Maurice Bossy (1929–2008), Canadian and provincial politician was educated in Pain Court.
- Joseph Caron (b. 1947), the former Canadian diplomat, was raised in Pain Court.
- Lawrence Raymond "Jerry" Gervais (1919–2002) was raised in Pain Court, and is the father of British comedian Ricky Gervais (b. 1961).
- Arthur Pelkey (1884–1921), heavyweight boxer.

== See also ==
- Waterfront Trail, from Sault Ste. Marie to Quebec
