= International Plowing Match =

Annual agricultural event in Ontario, Canada

The International Plowing Match (IPM), held annually in Ontario, is North America's largest outdoor agricultural and rural expo. It is usually held in late September, and usually attracts more than 80,000 visitors over the 5-day event. Each International Plowing Match takes years of planning and months of labour to prepare. It has several attractions, including the plow fields, Tent City, and the RV park. A transportation network of tractors and wagons carries visitors to and from different areas of the site. The IPM is organized and run by the Ontario Plowmen's Association (OPA).

The 2016 IPM in Minto occupied over 1,200 acres, and had 500 exhibitors.

== History ==
Plowing Matches have been part of Ontario agricultural history for over a century. Early events were sponsored by Agricultural Societies.

A feature of the first provincial exhibition, the 1846 Provincial Agricultural Fair of Canada West in Toronto, was a plowing match, held at a farm near Yonge Street and St. Clair Avenue.

The Ontario Plowmen's Association was formed in 1911.

The first International Plowing Match was held in 1913. Held at Sunnybrook farm near Toronto, the event featured as entries 31 single-furrow horse-drawn plows with no classes dedicated to tractors. By 1916 their influence had grown so that the representation of horse-drawn plows and tractors was nearly balanced with 30 plows and 25 tractors used during competition. There was no Tent City until the year 1917. The IPM has been held every year since 1913, with the exception of 1918 and 1942–1945 which were not held due to WW2 & 2020, 2021 due to the COVID19 pandemic.

== Plowing ==
Visitors can see competitors plow in the field. There are several different classes of plowing, taking place in different fields. The two main classes are horse plowing, and tractor plowing. Some different plowing classes for tractors include depend on how many furrows the plow has. Other tractor plowing classes include antique plowing, and 4H (youth) plowing. Plowing is "judged for straightness, firmness, evenness, depth, shape and uniformity. A good plowed furrow must be straight with a smooth trough and clean, even sides."

== Tent City ==
The Tent City is the most popular attraction at the IPM. It is where visitors can learn about agricultural life, and exhibitors showcase their products to the public. It consists of a series of streets, roads, and avenues, that are created specifically for the match. The streets are for visitors to walk through and see the exhibits. Between streets run service roads which vehicles with a red parking pass can drive through. Service roads also have hydro poles to provide power to the city, and give exhibitors more access to their site. The avenues of the city run perpendicular to the streets and service roads. They also have hydro poles, and are accessible to both vehicles and pedestrians. All the streets and service roads are named in numerical order, while the avenues are named after major sponsors of the IPM. The city has several entrances surrounding the perimeter where visitors pay for admission. Tent City continues to grow each year, and its land area is approximately 100 acres.

== RV Park ==
The RV park is an optional place for visitors to stay overnight if they plan to attend the IPM for more than one day. The RV park provides visitors with a site for a camp trailer or motorhome, it also provides water and electricity. Washrooms are also located in different areas in the park. Inside the RV park every year is an entertainment tent. The entertainment tent offers music and live shows to anyone registered in the park. The RV park is located either beside, or very close to Tent City. The RV park often takes up the same land area as Tent City, and occasionally has been bigger.

== Queen of the Furrow ==
Every year, an Ontario Queen of the Furrow is chosen to represent the Ontario Plowmen's Association and to promote the next year's International Plowing Match. The Queen also travels around Ontario promoting agriculture. A new Queen of the Furrow is chosen every year during the IPM at the Queen's Banquet. All contestants begin as Queens representing their County before they can represent Ontario.

== IPM 100th controversy ==
In 2013, the International Plowing match had its 100th anniversary celebration in Perth County. It is disputed whether or not 2013 should have marked the 100th year for the IPM. Some argue that since the match was canceled during war time, the match in 2017 should celebrate the 100th anniversary. Others argue that the first International Plowing Match was in 1913, so 2013 should be 100th celebration for the IPM. In result of the controversy, the 100th anniversary celebration was held in Perth County in 2013, and the 100th IPM during the 2017 match in Huron County.

== Notable Visitors ==
Many political figures in the Canadian Government have made visits to the International Plowing Match. Many of these figures are involved in the opening and closing ceremonies. Justin Trudeau made a visit to the 2014 IPM in Simcoe County, and Kathleen Wynne made an appearance during the 2016 IPM in Wellington County. Due to its importance in rural Ontario, the legislature suspends sitting for two days so all party leaders can attend the IPM. By tradition, all party leaders who visit the International Plowing Match attempt plowing.

== Sites ==
A few of the past sites are listed here.

- 2022: North Grenville, Kemptville
- 2020/2021: Lindsay, Kawartha Lakes - cancelled due to COVID-19 pandemic
- 2019: Verner, West Nipissing
- 2018: Village of Pain Court, Chatham-Kent
- 2017: Walton, Huron County
- 2016: Town of Minto, Wellington County. The 2016 IPM in Minto occupied over 1,200 acres, and had 500 exhibitors. The RCMP Musical Ride was a feature.
- 2015: United Counties of Stormont, Dundas and Glengarry
- 2014: Ivy, Simcoe County
- 2013: Mitchell, Perth County. During the 2013 a severe rain storm went through during the night. Officials were forced to shut down Tent City the following morning on the very last day of the match. Tent City remained closed for the rest of the day due to severe flooding. This resulted in not having the official closing ceremonies that were originally supposed to happen that day. The rain also left hundreds of people stranded inside the RV park due to the amount of mud. Some visitors spent days longer in the RV park before being able to leave.
- 2012: Roseville, Regional Municipality of Waterloo
- 2011: Hawkesbury, United Counties of Prescott and Russell
- 2010: St. Thomas, Elgin County
- 2009: Earlton, Timiskaming District. First IPM in Northern Ontario. Had 80,000 visitors, 600 exhibitors and 2,100 serviced RV lots on a 1,000 acre venue
- 2008: Teeswater, Bruce County, Ontario. About 84,000 people attended. Premier Dalton McGuinty opened the event. Prominent visitors included Tsuneto Sasaki, Japanese Trade Commissioner, John Tory, and Ontario's Lieutenant Governor David C. Onley
- 2007: Scott & Tracy Davison, Meaford, Grey County
- 2004: Scott & Tracy Davison, Meaford, Grey County
- 2002: Glencoe, Middlesex County
- 2000: Elora, Wellington County
- 1999: Dashwood, Huron County
- 1998: Sunbury, Frontenac County
- 1993: Walkerton, Bruce County
- 1992: Lindsay, Victoria County
- 1991: Enniskillen, Lambton County
- 1990: Brantford, County of Brant
- 1989: Essex County
- 1988: Stratford, Perth County
- 1987: John Lowe Family & neighbouring farms, Meaford, Grey County

The 1983 Ottawa Carlton event had an attendance of 142,000 for a 5-day event. 600 exhibitors occupied a 100-acre "tent city". Two hundred plowmen were in competition. The event was opened by federal Minister of Agriculture, Eugene Whelan. Also attending were Ontario Minister of Agriculture Dennis Timbrell, various local MPs, and the regional chair. The opening parade took 25 minutes to pass a given point. There were 200 competing plowmen.

A 60 foot long corn mural, created for the 1979 Chatham-Kent IPM, was inadvertently destroyed in 2013.

The 1978 event near Wingham was opened by astronaut Neil Armstrong to about 30,000 first day attendees. Overall attendance was 220000, a record to that date.

The 1966 match near Seaforth was famous for mud, as torrential rains and high winds lashed the site. The IPM was opened by the Federal Minister of Agriculture. Ontario Premier John Robarts visited. Paid admission was 50,000, despite the weather.

The 1936 match near Cornwall was a 4-day event; 40,000 people visited on one day. The matches were spread over 40 farms. Over 175 acres of land were plowed during competition. Electricity was not generally available in the area, but lines were run especially for the event. The mayor of Cornwall hosted a dinner for over 700 participating plowmen.
