= Ministry of Municipal Affairs and Housing (Ontario) =

Ministry of the Government of Ontario

- Ministère des Affaires municipales et du Logement (French)
- Government of Ontario wordmark

Ministry overview
- Formed: 1948
- Jurisdiction: Government of Ontario
- Ministers responsible: Rob Flack, Minister of Municipal Affairs and Housing; Graydon Smith, Associate Minister of Municipal Affairs and Housing
- Website: Official website

The Ministry of Municipal Affairs and Housing is the ministry of the Government of Ontario that is responsible for municipal affairs and housing in the Canadian province of Ontario. The Minister responsible is Rob Flack.

== History ==
The Department of Municipal Affairs was established in 1934 by the Department of Municipal Affairs Act, which was passed in 1935. It inherited the municipal administrative and regulatory functions which had briefly been the responsibility of the Ontario Municipal Board. Initially, it was responsible for supervising the affairs of the municipalities whose real property tax-revenue base had collapsed during the Depression. After The Second World War, it became more involved in the provision of administrative and financial advice and support to municipalities.

From 1947 until 1955, the Minister of Municipal Affairs acted as the Registrar General, and the Office of the Registrar General was attached to the department. This office was transferred to the Department of the Provincial Secretary in 1955.

In April 1972, the department was dissolved, with most of its functions being transferred to the newly created Ministry of Treasury, Economics and Inter-governmental Affairs, but with the assessment function being given to the Ministry of Revenue.

In 1973, the Ministry of Housing was established by The Ministry of Housing Act, inheriting the Plans Administration Branch from the Ministry of Treasury, Economics and Intergovernmental Affairs, as well as the Ontario Housing Corporation from the Ministry of Revenue.

In 1981, the Ministry of Municipal Affairs and Housing was formed by the consolidation of municipal affairs functions into the Ministry of Housing.

However, the ministry was divided again into two -- the Ministry of Municipal Affairs, and the Ministry of Housing -- from 1985 (under Premier David Peterson) until 1989, from 1991 (under Premier Bob Rae) until 1995, and from 2016 (under Premier Kathleen Wynne) until 2018.

== List of ministers ==
Name	Term of office		Name	Term of office		Political party (Ministry)	Note
Minister of Municipal Affairs						Liberal (Hepburn)	
David Croll	July 10, 1934	April 14, 1937				Liberal (Hepburn)	
Eric Cross	October 12, 1937	November 22, 1940				Liberal (Hepburn)	
Thomas McQuesten	November 22, 1940	October 21, 1942				Liberal (Hepburn)	
Thomas McQuesten	October 21, 1942	May 18, 1943				Liberal (Conant)	
Eric Cross	May 18, 1943	August 17, 1943				Liberal (Nixon)	
George Dunbar	August 17, 1943	October 19, 1948				PC (Drew)	
George Dunbar	October 19, 1948	May 4, 1949				PC (Kennedy)	
George Dunbar	May 4, 1949	August 17, 1955				PC (Frost)	
Bill Goodfellow	August 17, 1955	November 1, 1956				PC (Frost)	
Bill Warrender	November 1, 1956	November 8, 1961				PC (Frost)	
Fred Cass	November 8, 1961	October 25, 1962				PC (Robarts)	
Wilf Spooner	October 25, 1962	November 23, 1967				PC (Robarts)	
Darcy McKeough	November 23, 1967	March 1, 1971				PC (Robarts)	
Dalton Bales	March 1, 1971	February 2, 1972				PC (Davis)	
Darcy McKeough	February 2, 1972	April 7, 1972				PC (Davis)	
Treasurer, Minister of Economics and Intergovernmental Affairs						PC (Davis)	
Darcy McKeough	April 10, 1972	September 7, 1972				PC (Davis)	Municipal affairs functions were discharged by Ministry of Treasury, Economics and Inter-governmental Affairs from 1972 to 1981
Charles MacNaughton	September 7, 1972	January 15, 1973				PC (Davis)	
John White	January 15, 1973	June 18, 1975	Minister of Housing			PC (Davis)	
John White	January 15, 1973	June 18, 1975	Bob Welch	November 7, 1973	February 26, 1974	PC (Davis)	
John White	January 15, 1973	June 18, 1975	Sid Handleman	February 26, 1974	October 7, 1974	PC (Davis)	
John White	January 15, 1973	June 18, 1975	Donald Roy Irvine	October 7, 1974	October 7, 1975	PC (Davis)	
Darcy McKeough	June 18, 1975	August 16, 1978	Donald Roy Irvine	October 7, 1974	October 7, 1975	PC (Davis)	
Darcy McKeough	June 18, 1975	August 16, 1978	John Rhodes	October 7, 1975	January 21, 1978	PC (Davis)	
Darcy McKeough	June 18, 1975	August 16, 1978	Claude Bennett	January 31, 1978	July 3, 1981	PC (Davis)	
Frank Miller	August 16, 1978	August 18, 1978	Claude Bennett	January 31, 1978	July 3, 1981	PC (Davis)	Miller continues to be Treasurer and Minister of Economics until July 6, 1983
Minister of Intergovernmental Affairs			Claude Bennett	January 31, 1978	July 3, 1981	PC (Davis)	
Tom Wells	August 18, 1978	February 8, 1985	Claude Bennett	January 31, 1978	July 3, 1981	PC (Davis)	Municipal affairs functions were transferred to the re-created ministry in 1981
Minister of Municipal Affairs and Housing						PC (Davis)	
Claude Bennett				July 3, 1981	February 8, 1985	PC (Davis)	
Dennis Timbrell				February 8, 1985	June 26, 1985	PC (Miller)	
Minister of Municipal Affairs			Minister of Housing			Liberal (Peterson)	
Bernard Grandmaitre	June 26, 1985	September 29, 1987	Alvin Curling	June 26, 1985	September 29, 1987	Liberal (Peterson)	
John Eakins	September 29, 1987	August 2, 1989	Chaviva Hošek	September 29, 1987	August 2, 1989	Liberal (Peterson)	
Minister of Municipal Affairs and Housing						Liberal (Peterson)	
John Sweeney				August 2, 1989	October 1, 1990	Liberal (Peterson)	
Dave Cooke				October 1, 1990	July 31, 1991	NDP (Rae)	
Minister of Municipal Affairs			Minister of Housing			NDP (Rae)	
Dave Cooke	July 31, 1991	February 3, 1993	Evelyn Gigantes	July 31, 1991	August 18, 1994	NDP (Rae)	
Ed Philip	February 3, 1993	June 26, 1995	Richard Allen	August 22, 1994	June 26, 1995	NDP (Rae)	
Minister of Municipal Affairs and Housing						PC (Harris)	
Al Leach				June 26, 1995	June 17, 1999	PC (Harris)	
Steve Gilchrist				June 17, 1999	October 25, 1999	PC (Harris)	
Tony Clement				October 25, 1999	February 8, 2001	PC (Harris)	
Chris Hodgson				February 8, 2001	April 15, 2002	PC (Harris)	
Chris Hodgson				April 15, 2002	January 13, 2003	PC (Eves)	Tina Molinari served as Associate Minister of Municipal Affairs and Housing Responsible for Urban Affairs from April 15, 2002 to October 22, 2003
Helen Johns				January 14, 2003	February 25, 2003	PC (Eves)	Appointed as interim minister
David Young				February 25, 2003	October 22, 2003	PC (Eves)	Ernie Hardeman served as Associate Minister of Municipal Affairs and Housing Responsible for Rural Affairs from February 25, 2003 to October 22, 2003
John Gerretsen				October 23, 2003	October 15, 2007	Liberal (McGuinty)	
Jim Watson				October 30, 2007	January 12, 2010	Liberal (McGuinty)	
John Gerretsen				January 12, 2010	January 18, 2010	Liberal (McGuinty)	
Jim Bradley				January 18, 2010	August 18, 2010	Liberal (McGuinty)	
Rick Bartolucci				August 18, 2010	October 20, 2011	Liberal (McGuinty)	
Kathleen Wynne				October 20, 2011	November 5, 2012	Liberal (McGuinty)	
Bob Chiarelli				November 5, 2012	February 11, 2013	Liberal (McGuinty)	Appointed as interim minister
Linda Jeffrey				February 11, 2013	March 25, 2014	Liberal (Wynne)	
Bill Mauro				March 25, 2014	June 24, 2014	Liberal (Wynne)	
Ted McMeekin				June 24, 2014	June 13, 2016	Liberal (Wynne)	
Minister of Municipal Affairs			Minister of Housing			Liberal (Wynne)	
Bill Mauro	June 13, 2016	June 29, 2018	Chris Ballard	June 13, 2016	July 31, 2017	Liberal (Wynne)	
Bill Mauro	June 13, 2016	June 29, 2018	Peter Milczyn	July 31, 2017	June 29, 2018	Liberal (Wynne)	
Minister of Municipal Affairs and Housing						PC (Ford)	
Steve Clark				June 29, 2018	September 4, 2023	PC (Ford)	
Paul Calandra				September 4, 2023	Incumbent	PC (Ford)	
Minister of Municipal Affairs and Housing			Associate Minister of Housing			PC (Ford)	
Paul Calandra	September 4, 2023	March 19, 2025	Vijay Thanigasalam	June 6, 2024	March 19, 2025	PC (Ford)	
Rob Flack	March 19, 2025	Incumbent	Graydon Smith	March 19, 2025	Incumbent	PC (Ford)	
