= Dufay River =

Dufay
- Location of the mouth of the Dufay River in Quebec

Location
- Country: Canada
- Province: Quebec
- Region: Abitibi-Témiscamingue
- District: Rouyn-Noranda

Physical characteristics
- Source: Dufay Lake
  - location: Rouyn-Noranda
  - coordinates: 48°02′09″N 79°36′04″W
  - elevation: 272 m (892 ft)
- Mouth: Lac Buies
  - location: Rouyn-Noranda
  - coordinates: 48°03′48″N 79°28′44″W
  - elevation: 254 m (833 ft)
- Length: 1.3 km (0.81 mi)

Basin features
- River system: Saint Lawrence River drainage basin

The Dufay River is a tributary of Lake Buies, flowing in the Northwestern part of the territory of the city of Rouyn-Noranda, in administrative region of Abitibi-Temiscamingue, in Quebec, in Canada.

Forestry is the main economic activity of this hydrographic slope; recreational tourism activities, second.

Annually, the surface of the river is generally frozen from mid-November to late April, however, the period of safe ice circulation is usually from mid-December to early April.

== Courses ==
The river begins at the mouth of the Dufay Lake (length: 3.3 kilometres (2.1 mi); width: 2.3 kilometres (1.4 mi); altitude: 272 metres (892 ft)) in the area of Montbeillard. Lake Dufay has an island of 1.3 kilometres (0.81 mi) in length in the middle. It is fed on the East side by the outlet of Lake Abenakis and Lake Senaka.

From the dam at the mouth of Dufay Lake (located to the South of the lake), the river flows on 1.3 kilometres (0.81 mi) towards the northwest, to its mouth The mouth of the Dufay River empties onto the south shore of Buies Lake. This confluence is located at:

- 2.9 metres (9 ft 6 in) South-west of the Quebec - Ontario border;
- 9.1 kilometres (5.7 mi) Northeast of the mouth of Raven Lake (Ontario);
- 36.1 kilometres (22.4 mi) Northwest of the mouth of the Larder River (Ontario) (confluence with the Blanche River (Lake Timiskaming);
- 55.7 kilometres (34.6 mi) north of the mouth of the Blanche River (Lake Timiskaming) (confluence with Lake Timiskaming).

From the confluence of the Dufay River with Lake Buies, the current flows through Raven Lake, then descends successively to the Larder River (Ontario), Blanche River (Lake Timiskaming), the Lake Timiskaming which is crossed by the Ottawa River which is the largest tributary of the North Shore of the St. Lawrence River.

== Toponymy ==
The term "Dufay" is a family name of French origin.

The toponym "Dufay River" has been officialized on December 5, 1968, at the Commission de toponymie du Québec, i.e. at the creation of this commission.

== See also ==
- Dufay Lake, a body of water
- Raven Lake, a body of water
- Larder River (Ontario), a watercourse
- Blanche River (Lake Timiskaming), a watercourse
- Lake Timiskaming, a body of water
- Ottawa River, a watercourse
- List of rivers of Quebec
