= Virginiatown bank robbery =

1972 Canadian crime

Virginiatown Bank Robbery
- Location: Canadian Imperial Bank of Commerce, Virginiatown, Ontario
- Date: December 21, 1972
- Attack type: Robbery
- Weapons: 1 machine gun, 1 pistol
- Deaths: 0
- Injuries: 0
- Motive: Robbery

The Virginiatown Bank Robbery was a 1972 robbery of the Canadian Imperial Bank of Commerce in Virginiatown, Ontario, Canada.

== Robbery ==
At 9:30am, on Thursday December 21, 1972, two French-speaking armed robbers charged into the Canadian Imperial Bank of Commerce in Virginiatown and demanded to be provided with the bank's cash. One staff member was on the phone at the moment the robbers entered, and relayed the situation to the telephone operator who summoned the police. The robbers were armed with a pistol and a machine gun.

The robbery was timed to coincide with the bank holding the money for that Friday's Kerr-Addison Mine salary payments. Staff provided the robbers with approximately $60,000 in cash.

Neighbouring gas station owner Dave Mann observed the armed men entering the bank and discharged his .303 calibre rifle towards the bank. Mann's shot scared off the getaway driver, leaving the robbers stranded inside. Police arrived on the scene, but were overpowered by the robbers, who stole their vehicle and used it to abduct branch manager Robert (Bob) Emmell. 2015 local reporting indicates that staff member Helen Gibson was also held hostage.

Leaving in the police vehicle, the robbers drove towards Quebec, dropping Emmell near the Mount Cheminis, while changing vehicles and shooting the tires of the abandoned police car. Nobody was injured during the events.

Later the same morning, Sûreté du Québec arrested and charged a 25-year-old man from Arntfield before releasing him on a $500 bail. As of 2008, nobody had been found guilty of the crime.

== See also ==
- Havelock Bank Robbery
- List of bank robbers and robberies
