= Laberge River =

Laberge
- Location of the mouth of the Laberge River in Quebec

Location
- Country: Canada
- Provinces: Quebec, Ontario
- District: Abitibi-Témiscamingue, Timiskaming
- Municipality: Rouyn-Noranda

Physical characteristics
- Source: Icefish Lake
  - location: Timiskaming District, Ontario
  - coordinates: 47°58′19″N 79°31′57″W
  - elevation: 290 m (950 ft)
- Mouth: Lac Buies
  - location: Rouyn-Noranda, Abitibi-Témiscamingue, Quebec
  - coordinates: 48°00′34″N 79°30′07″W
  - elevation: 264 m (866 ft)
- Length: 10.6 km (6.6 mi)

Basin features
- River system: Saint Lawrence River drainage basin

The Laberge River is a tributary of Lake Hebert, flowing in Canada, in:

- Rattray Township of Timiskaming District, in Northeastern Ontario;
- Rollet and Montbeillard sectors in the Northwest of Regional County Municipality (RCM) of Rouyn-Noranda, Abitibi-Témiscamingue, in Quebec.

Forestry is the main economic activity of this hydrographic slope; recreational and tourism activities, in second.

Annually, the surface of the river is generally frozen from mid-November to late April, however, the period of safe ice circulation is usually from mid-December to early April.

== Courses ==
The river begins at the mouth of Icefield Lake (length: 1.4 kilometres (0.87 mi) altitude: 290 metres (950 ft)) in Rattray Township, District of Timiskaming, in Ontario. This lake is located at 1.3 kilometres (0.81 mi) Southeast of a mountain with a peak of 429 metres (1,407 ft), and at 0.5 kilometres (0.31 mi) at West of the border Ontario - Quebec.

From the mouth of Icefield Lake, the Laberge River flows over 10.6 kilometres (6.6 mi), according to the following segments:

- 3.5 kilometres (2.2 mi) south, then east, in Rattray Township, Timiskaming District, Ontario, to the border of Quebec;
- 0.5 kilometres (0.31 mi) in the Rollet sector, the Regional County Municipality (MRC) of Rouyn-Noranda, Abitibi-Témiscamingue, Quebec;
- 2.6 kilometres (1.6 mi) to the North, crossing Lake Laberge (length: 2.6 kilometres (1.6 mi); width: 1.9 kilometres (1.2 mi); altitude: 275 metres (902 ft));
- 2.1 kilometres (1.3 mi) North to the southern boundary of the Montbillard area of the regional county municipality (RCM) of Rouyn-Noranda;
- 1.9 kilometres (1.2 mi) North in the Montbeillard sector to its mouth.

The mouth of the Laberge River empties onto the South shore of Lake Hébert. This confluence is located at:

- 1.2 metres (3 ft 11 in) Southwest of the Quebec - Ontario border;
- 5.7 kilometres (3.5 mi) South of the mouth of the Lac Hébert outlet (confluence with Lake Buies);
- 6.2 kilometres (3.9 mi) Northeast of the mouth of Raven Lake (Ontario);
- 30.8 kilometres (19.1 mi) Northwest of the mouth Larder River (Ontario).

== Toponymy ==
The term "Laberge" is a family name of French origin.

The toponym "Laberge River" was formalized on December 5, 1968, by the Commission de toponymie du Québec, when the commission was created.

== See also ==
- Lac Hebert, a body of water
- Lake Raven, a body of water
- Laberge River Provincial Park
- Larder River (Ontario), a watercourse
- Blanche River (Lake Timiskaming), a training course
- Lake Timiskaming, a water body
- Ottawa River, a watercourse
- List of rivers of Quebec
