= Kerr-Addison Mine =

Gold mine in McGarry, Ontario, Canada

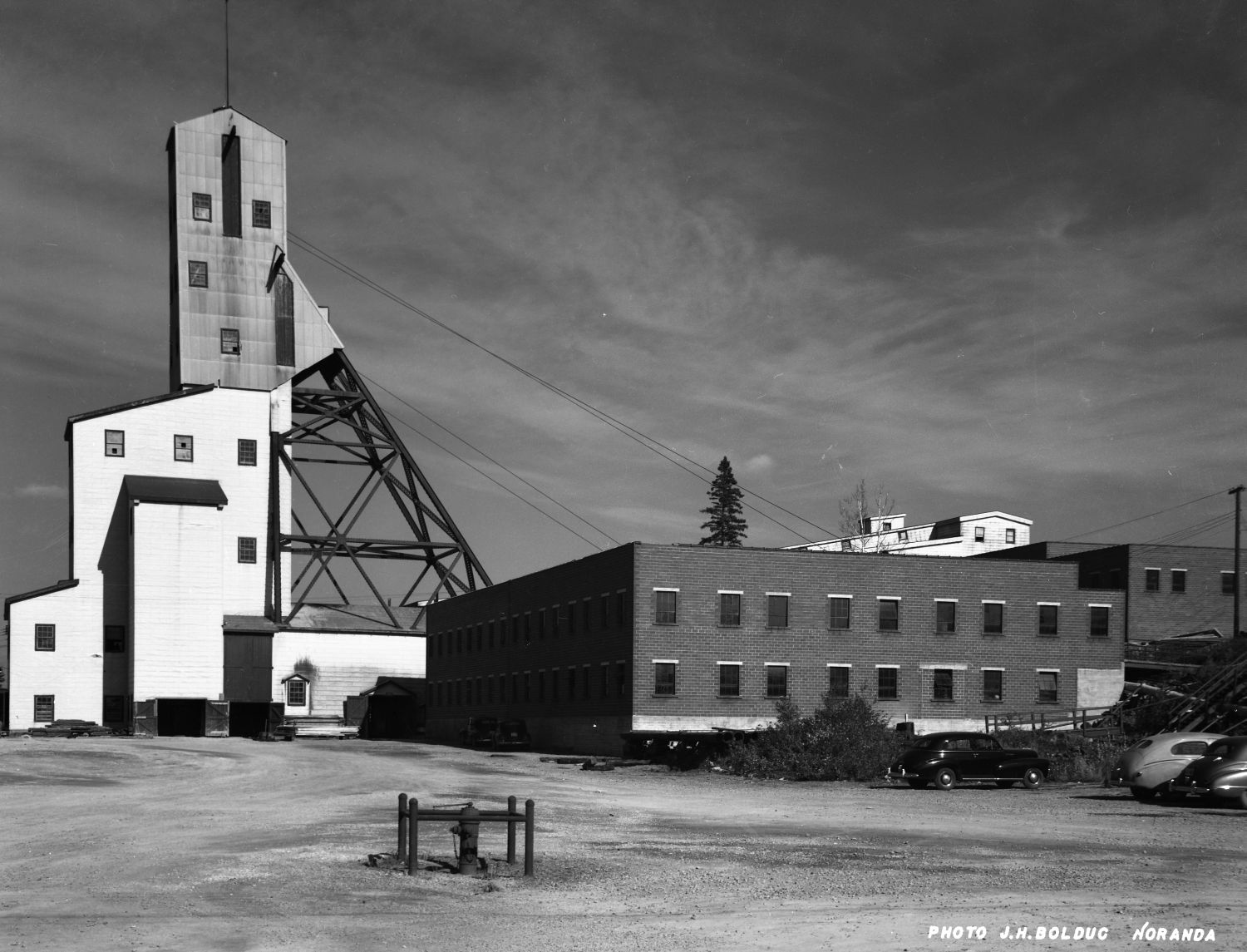
- Mine buildings, 1947

- Location near McGarry, Ontario
- Location: McGarry,Ontario,Canada; 48°08′19″N 79°34′39″W
- Products: Gold
- Production: 12 million ounces
- Greatest depth: 1,829 metres
- Active: Early 1900s: marginally active 1920-1923: exploration 1936-1963: operational 1990-1996: operational
- Company: Golden Candle Ltd

Local impacts
- Pollution: Cyanide
- Impacted: Larder Lake

The Kerr–Addison Mine (also known as the Kerr Mine) is an abandoned Canadian gold mine in the Kearns area of McGarry, Ontario. In 1960, the mine was the largest producer of gold in North America. The mine produced the second most gold overall in North America, with the Homestake Mine being the leader.

The mine is located in basalt of the Abitibi gold belt area in what became the Timiskaming District.

Gold ore was initially discovered at the mine's location around 1900 by Teme-Augama Anishnabai chief Ignace Tonené. European settlers stole Tonené's claim to the ore and started small-scale mining. Production was initially low, but increased from 1936 until its peak in 1960. Employees unionised in 1943. Ore extraction ended in 1960 and production completely stopped in 1963. The increase in global gold prices caused the mine to reopen from 1990 until 1996, by which time over 12 million ounces had been produced. Tailings from the operation were dumped in Larder Lake.

Ownership of the mine changed several times, owners included Golden Shield Resources, a subsidiary of Deak Resources, AJ Perron, and Armistice Resources Corporation, which changed its name to Kerr Mine Ltd. Kerr Mine became Arizona Gold and sold its assets to Golden Candle Limited. Throughout the transfers surface and mining rights did not always stay with the same corporation, although the latest owner, Golden Candle, now holds both.

== Location and geology ==
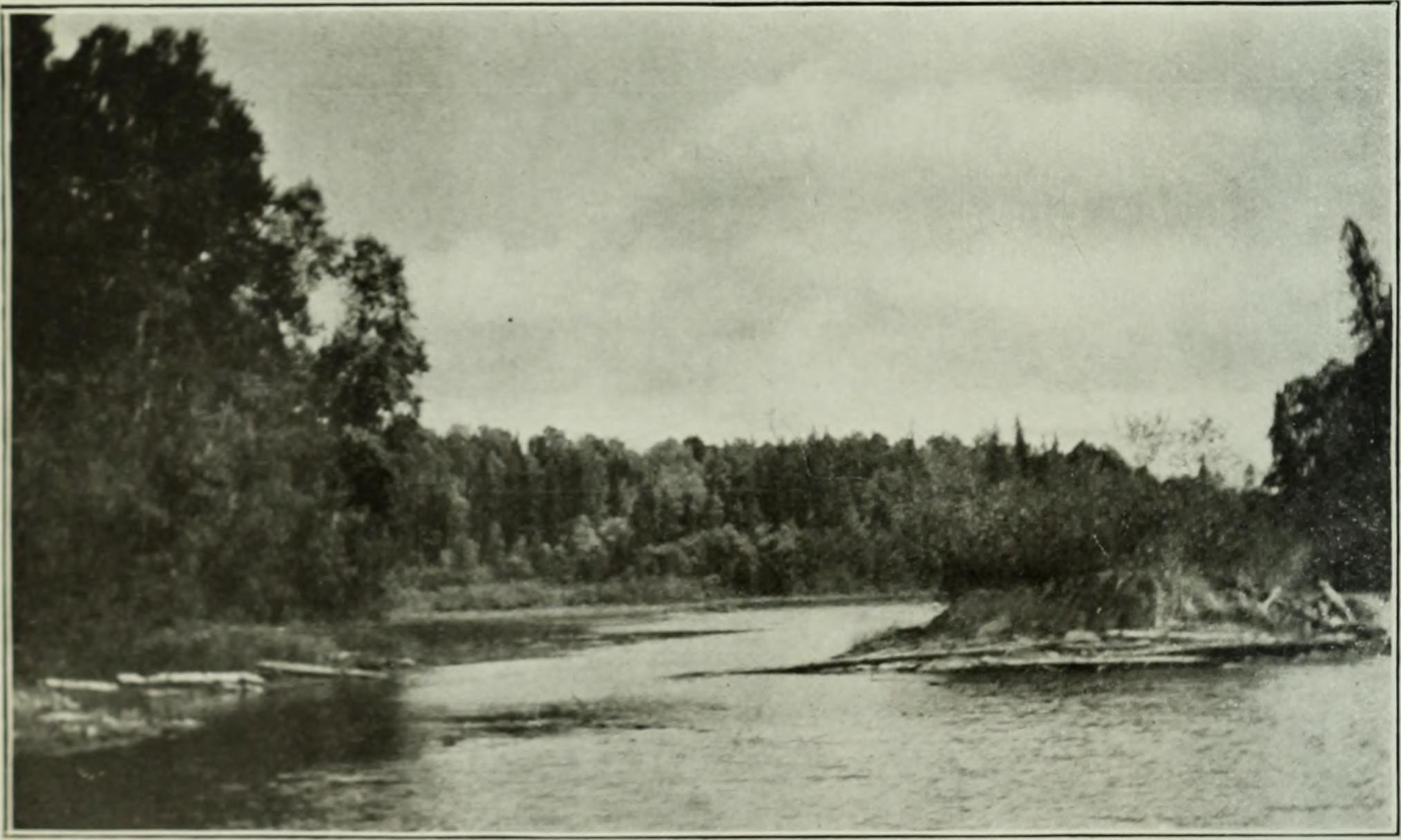
Larder Lake, 1895

The mine is situated on the north east edge of Larder Lake, in the Timiskaming District of Ontario, Canada.

The mine is located in basalt of the Abitibi gold belt. The area of the mine is located between the Timiskaming grouping of metasedimentary rock and Keewatin groupings of metavolcanic rock. The area around the mine includes greywacke, talc-chlorite schist, and syenite rocks.

While predominately containing gold, the ore also contained silver, copper and tungsten. In total, between 1938 and 1996 the mine produced more than 12 million ounces of gold. In 1960, the mine was the largest producer of gold in North America. In 1969, the mine produced the second most gold overall in North America, with the Homestake Mine being the leader.

== History ==
=== Gold discovery ===
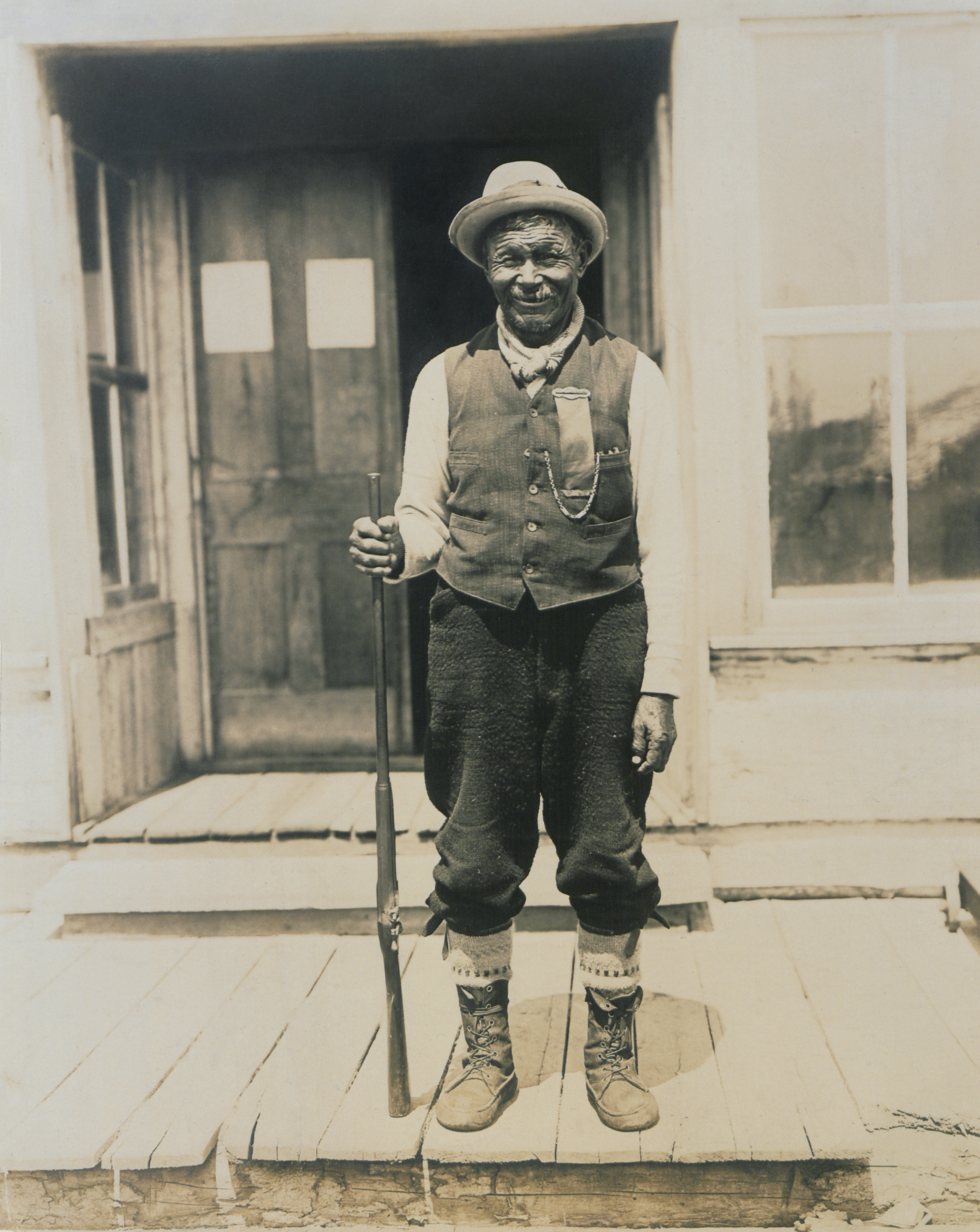
Chief Ignace Tonené, 1909

In the very late 19th century, Ignace Tonené, chief of the Teme-Augama Anishnabai community, discovered gold ore on the side of Larder Lake. Although Tonené properly registered his staking claims, the registration was not respected, and European settlers jumped his claim, registering it again in their name. At that time, the Indian Act of 1876 prevented Indigenous people from hiring lawyers.

In 1904, H. L. Kerr examined the area north of Larder Lake and concluded he should revisit it for further investigation. Kerr was a 1903 graduate of the University of Toronto who had spent one week of geological mapping as an assistant at the Geological Survey of Canada. Kerr shared his analysis with William Addison, who visited the area in 1906 and discovered Dr Reddick of Ottawa already surveying it.

Kerr and Addison registered their claim in 1906, Dr Reddick of Ottawa registered a claim for the adjoining property, and the Ottawa-based Chesterville-Larder Lake Gold Mining Company Ltd registered the Hummel-Kearns claim in 1906 or 1907. Kerr-Addison Gold Mines was formed.

=== Start of mining ===
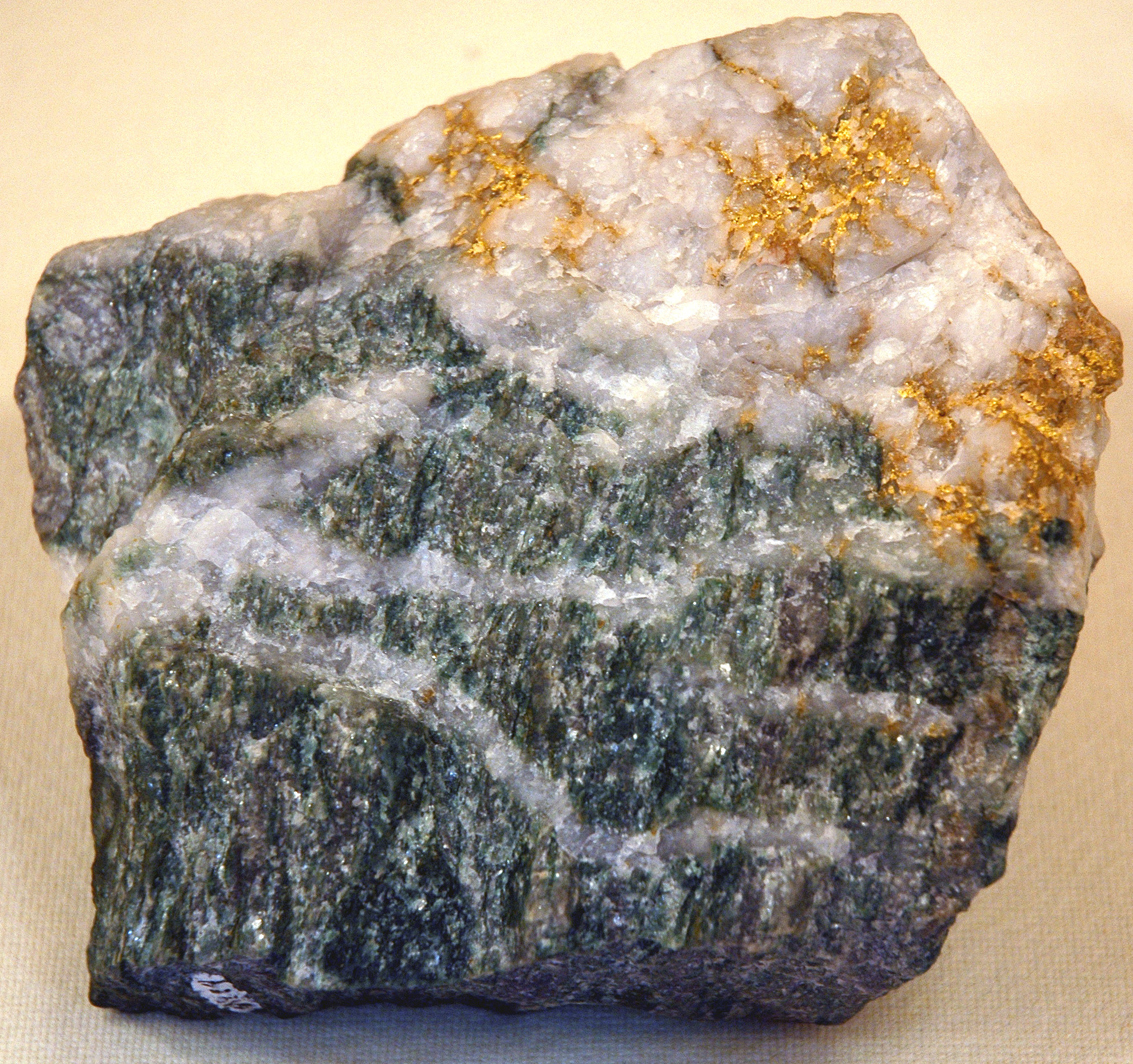
Gold ore from Larder Lake, 2006

The ownership of the mine passed between three companies, the third being Associated Goldfields Limited, who bought both the Kerr-Addison mine, and the adjacent Reddick mine, in 1917. The company became Canadian Associated Goldfields in 1921 before going bankrupt in 1928. Proprietary Mines Limited was then formed and took over the mines, and an additional nearby sixteen claims.

Between 1920 and 1921, Proprietary Mines Limited sunk a 91-metre shaft and developed levels at 175 feet (53 m) and 300 feet (91 m) depth. The lower level cross-cut missed the ore body by about 6 metres, and although more drilling did later reach the ore body, the mine was abandoned in 1923.

Kerr-Addison Mines was incorporated in 1936, out of a merger of Kerr-Addison Gold Mines, Anglo-Huronian, Bouzan Mines and Prospector Airways and purchased 26 full and 2 fractional claims in 1937. The company drove four adits to explore mineral veins into a hill on the west of the property where they found low grades of gold. Diamond drilling from within the #1 adit was successful and returned ore with 10.5 grams per ton of gold for over 33 metres. More drilling followed, as did the construction of a $1.75 million 450-tonnes-per-day processing mill. Ore processing started on May 2, 1938, and the first bar of gold was poured on June 11, 1938. The same year, the mine's owners requested government permission to dump mine tailings, containing cyanide, into Larder Lake. The mill was upgraded to be able to process 1,090 tons per day in 1939, and after significantly more gold was discovered at 1,000 feet depth in 1940, the mill was further upgraded to 1,725 tons per day in 1941. By 1958, shaft #3 was lowered to 1,174 metres, and #4 was lowered to 1,829 metres (6,000 feet) in 1959.

World War II decreased production to 1,000 tons per day, but it rose in 1948 to processing over 3,630 tons per day, which was maintained until 1961. The mine ranked as the top producing gold mine in North America in 1960, when it produced 18,400 kilograms of gold, generated from 1,512,860 tons of ore. Ore reserves dwindled in 1960 and all further exploration was abandoned in 1963, with the focus of the work shifting to removing ore that was already identified.

In 1957, the mine's owners acquired Chesterville gold mine.

==== Workers and unionisation ====
The mine employed 2,500 people at its peak. The Kerr-Addison Employees's Association union was formed in 1943. In December 1946 workers voted on joining the International Union of Mine, Mill and Smelter Workers. The Kerr-Addison union became affiliated with the Canadian National Federation of Independent Union in 1981 and in 1989 merged with United Steelworkers of America to become USWA Local 9283.

=== Late 20th-century to early 21st-century ===
Gold prices became deregulated and rose from $35 per ounce in 1971 to $800 per ounce in 1980. In 1987, owners Kerr-Addison Ltd sold the mine for $38 million to Golden Shield Resources Ltd, who started an ambitious exploration program. Shortly after, the global gold price sharply dropped, forcing Golden Shield into bankruptcy in 1989.

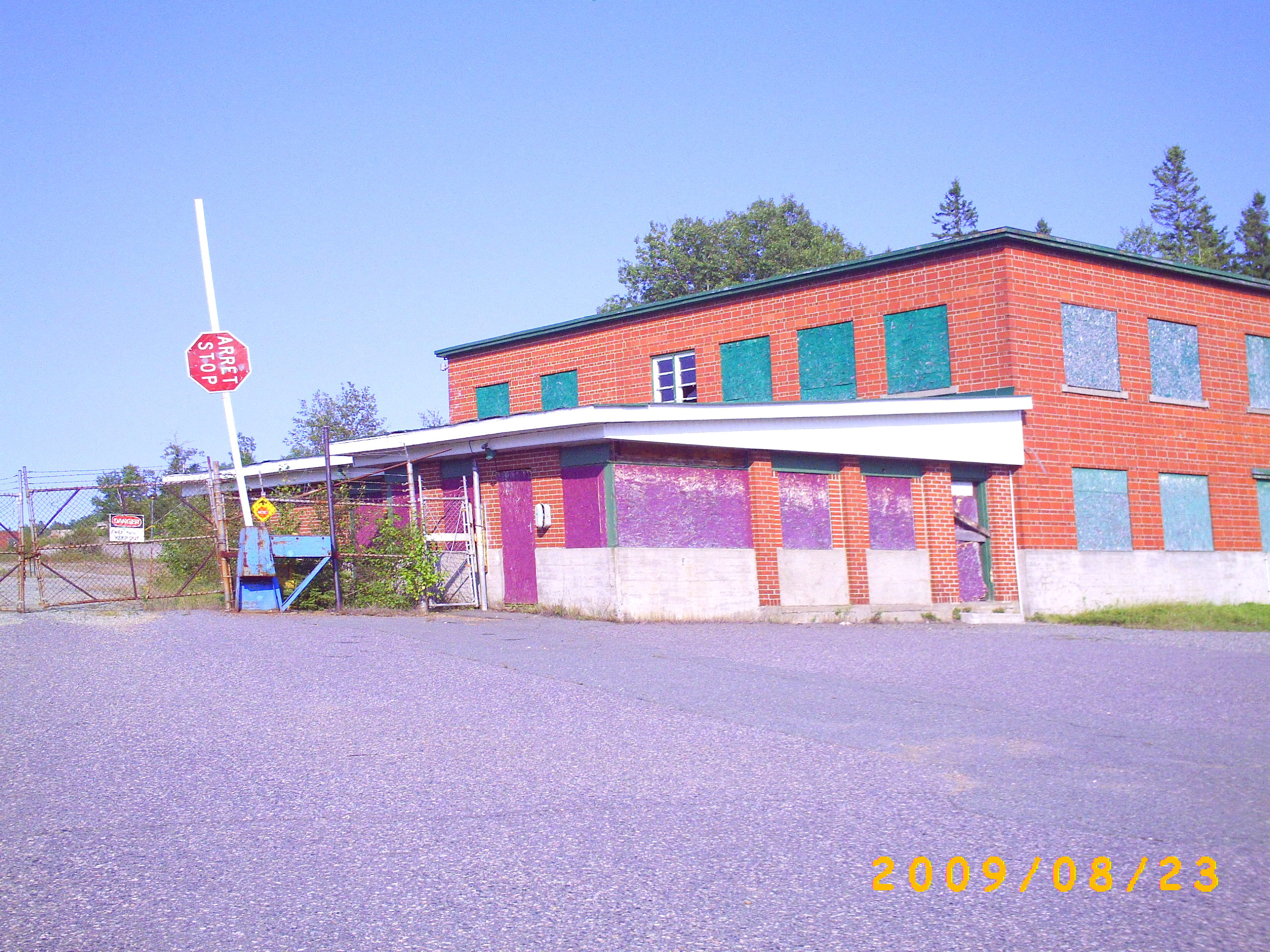
The mine's entrance building, 2009

Golden Shield's assets were purchased by GSR Mining Corporation, a subsidiary of Deak Resources of Toronto. Golden Shield restarted mining operations in 1990 with $2 million financial support from the Ontario Heritage Fund, which continued until 1996. During its ownership, the Ontario Ministry of the Environment fined Deak Resources $50,000 due to polluting effluent discharged into a waterway from the mine's Mill. Pollutants included heavy metals and cyanide. In 1994, a study by Environment Canada documented "high concentrates" of nickel, gold, copper, lead and zinc in Larder Lake.

In early 1997 McGarry township instructed bailiffs to seize assets at the mine and sell them to raise funds for unpaid taxes. Gwen Resources, AJ Perron Gold Corporation, GSR Mining Corporation and Kerr JEX Corporation, the four companies that owned the mine, threatened litigation against the township. Prior to the bailiffs action, the mine owed $2.1 million of realty taxes and $50,000 of business taxes. AJ Perron, the successor Deak Resources was delisted in 1998.

GSR, which retained 50 percent of the surface rights, merged with AJ Perron and collectively dissolved on April 10, 2000. In 2010, Armistice Resources Corporation, who already owned the neighboring McGarry Mine, bought the Kerr-Addison Mine, and in 2011 announced plans to drill for more gold. The Ontario Government instructed Armistice Resources to decommission the site, but they refused and took their disagreement to an environmental and land tribunal in 2013. They argued that they did not need to submit a mine closure plan as they were not the surface owner, as defined in the Mining Act. In 2018, the Mining and Lands Commissioner found in Armistice's favour and dismissed the previous governmental demands.

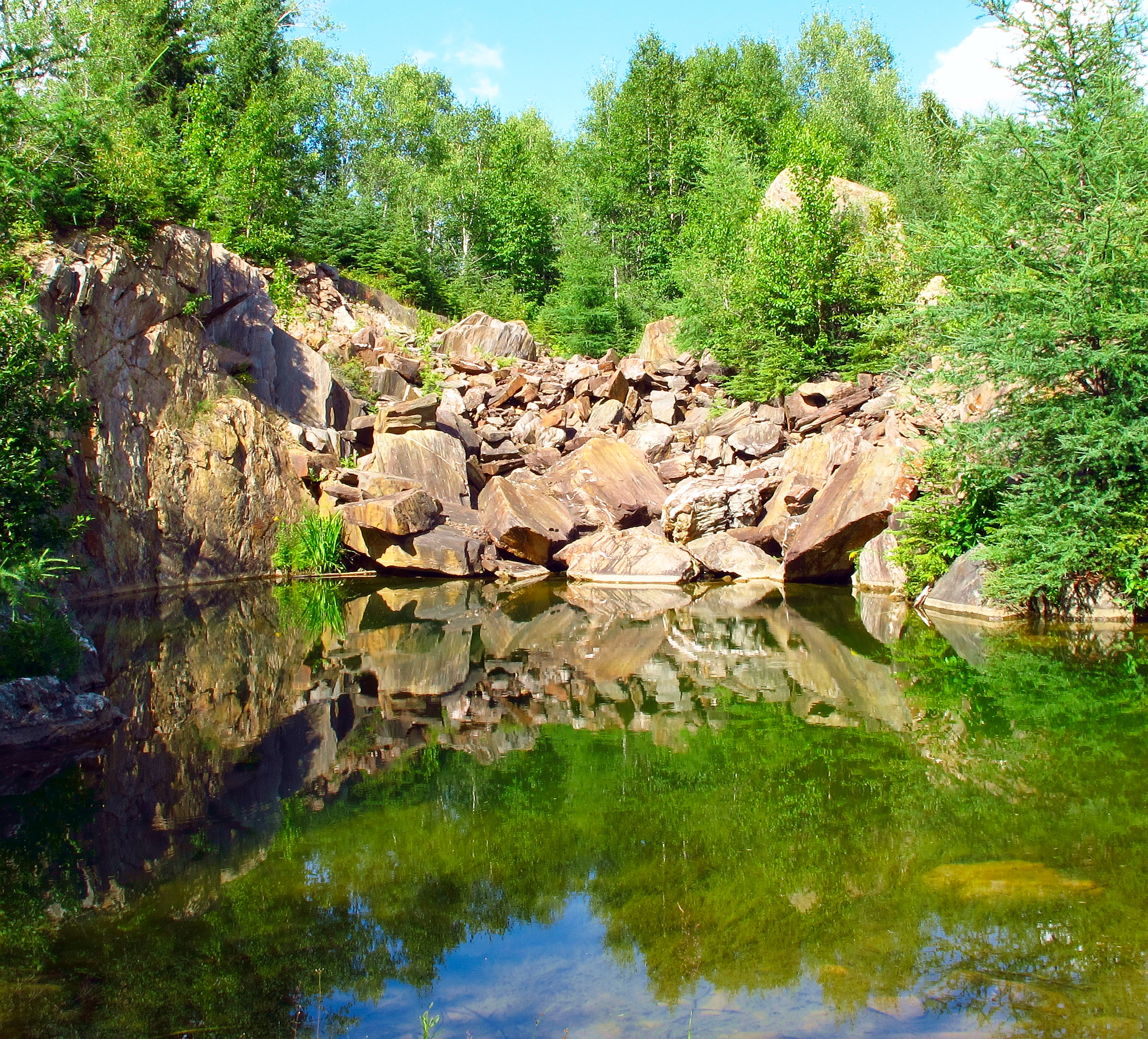
One of the three abandoned gold mines on Larder Lake, 2015

Armistice Resources changed their name to Kerr Mines Inc in 2014 and changed their Toronto Stock Exchange symbol to TSX:KER. In 2014, Kerr Mines sold the Kerr-Addison Mine, the adjoining McGarry Mine and associated mining claims, to Golden Candle Limited for $11 million. Kerr Mines later became Arizona Gold.

In 2016, Michael Berns, the owner of Gold Candle Ltd submitted an affidavit to court stating that dissolved owners of the surface rights (GSR/Deak and AJ Perron) had failed to remediate the site. As part of that court process, court-appointed receivers took rights over the surface rights mine and sold it to Gold Candle Ltd. As of 2021, Gold Candle Ltd owned 100 percent of the mine.

== See also ==
- Beanland Mine
- Cobalt: Cradle of the Demon Metals, Birth of a Mining Superpower
- List of gold mines in Canada
- Virginiatown bank robbery
