= Larder River (Ontario) =

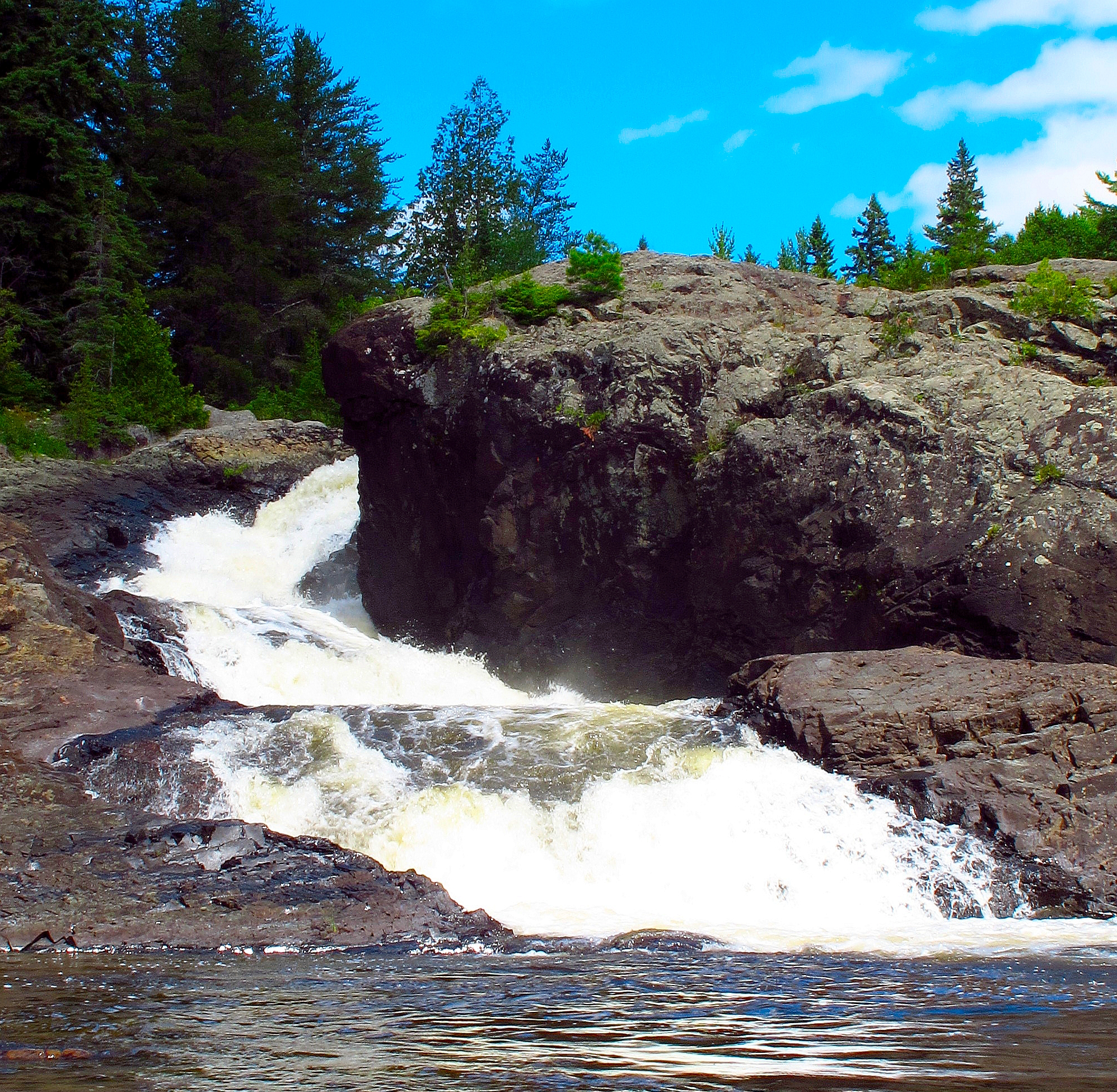
- Fourth Falls on the Larder River

- Location of the mouth of the Larder River in Ontario

Location
- Country: Canada
- Province: Ontario
- Region: Northeastern Ontario
- District: Timiskaming

Physical characteristics
- Source: Larder Lake
  - location: McFadden Township
  - coordinates: 48°02′12″N 79°36′03″W
  - elevation: 274 m (899 ft)
- Mouth: Blanche River
  - location: Evanturel
  - coordinates: 47°49′54″N 79°48′55″W
  - elevation: 180 m (590 ft)
- Length: 54.0 km (33.6 mi)

Basin features
- River system: Saint Lawrence River drainage basin

The Larder River is a river in Timiskaming District, in Northeastern Ontario, Canada. It is in the Saint Lawrence River drainage basin, and flows from its source at Larder Lake in geographic McFadden Township to its mouth as a left tributary of the Blanche River in the municipal township of Evanturel.

The section of river from Raven Lake to Upper Wendigo Lake runs through a northeasterly-oriented geologic fault system, with mafic metavolcanic bedrock to the west and sedimentary and volcanic rock to the east. The Larder River has many wild rapids, making it suitable for experienced whitewater canoeists.

== Course ==
The river begins at the mouth of the Larder Lake (length: 15.6 kilometres (9.7 mi) altitude: 274 metres (899 ft)) in Rattray geographic township in the Timiskaming District. This lake has the following bays: Southwest Arm, Spoon Bay and Northeast Arm.

The mouth of Larder Lake is located at:

- 6.2 metres (20 ft) West of the Ontario-Quebec border;
- 27.8 kilometres (17.3 mi) Northeast of the mouth of the Larder River (confluence with the Blanche River (Lake Timiskaming);
- 11.0 kilometres (6.8 mi) Southeast of the village centre of Larder Lake, Ontario;
- 53.0 kilometres (32.9 mi) Northwest of the mouth of the Blanche River (Lake Timiskaming).

From the dam at the mouth of Larder Lake (located south of the lake), the river flows over 54.0 kilometres (33.6 mi), according to the following segments:

Upper Larder River (segment of 30.3 kilometres (18.8 mi))

- 2.2 kilometres (1.4 mi) Southeasterly to the northwestern shore of Raven Lake. Note: The north-east part of Raven Lake receives the waters of Buies Lake, which drains the Quebec lakes in the Montbeillard (a sector of Rouyn-Noranda): Hébert, Dufay (Dufay River and Laberge River), Drapeau, Germain and Durand;
- 0.8 kilometres (0.50 mi) Southwesterly across the southern portion of Raven Lake (Ontario part);
- 0.9 kilometres (0.56 mi) South, crossing Corset Lake;
- 2.6 kilometres (1.6 mi) Southwesterly crossing Ward Lake;
- 4.5 kilometres (2.8 mi) Southwesterly to the easterly limit of the Township Municipality of Larder Lake;
- 4.5 kilometres (2.8 mi) Southwesterly in the township municipality of Larder Lake across the upper (northeastern) portion of Skead Lake (length: 4.0 kilometres (2.5 mi); altitude: 236 metres (774 ft)) to the north boundary of Bayly Township;
- 1.7 kilometres (1.1 mi) southwesterly in Bayly Township across upper Skead Lake to First Falls Falls.

Lower part of the Larder River (segment of 23.7 kilometres (14.7 mi))

- 4.7 kilometres (2.9 mi) Southwesterly, crossing the lower Skead Lake;
- 6.0 kilometres (3.7 mi) Westerly across Wendigo Lake in the Sand Ridge to the eastern limit of Marter Township;
- 9.8 kilometres (6.1 mi) in Marter Township with 1.8 kilometres (1.1 mi) heading west through the Wendigo Falls and Fourth Falls, then 8.0 kilometres (5.0 mi) southwesterly, in "Teddy's Falls", "Court Rapids" and "Garnett's Rapids", to the northerly limit of the township municipality of Evanturel;
- 3.2 kilometres (2.0 mi) Southwesterly in the township municipality of Evanturel snaking to its mouth. The mouth of the Larder River flows over the north-east of the Blanche River into the Timiskaming District. This confluence is located at:
- 22.3 metres (73 ft) Southwest of the border Ontario-Quebec;
- 4.4 kilometres (2.7 mi) Northeast of the village centre of Englehart, Ontario;
- 36.8 kilometres (22.9 mi) Northwest of the mouth of the Blanche River.

The Blanche River flows via Lake Timiskaming and the Ottawa River to the Saint Lawrence River.

== Provincial park ==
Larder River Waterway Provincial Park
- IUCN category II (national park)
- Interactive map of Larder River Waterway Provincial Park
- Coordinates: 47°58′21″N 79°37′37″W
- Area: 4,044.00 ha (15.6140 sq mi)
- Designation: Waterway
- Established: 1985
- Governing body: Ontario Parks
- Website: www.ontarioparks.com/park/larderriverwaterway

The Larder River Waterway Provincial Park protects a 30-kilometre-long (19 mi) section of the Larder River from Raven Lake to Upper Wendigo Lake, including the shores of the lakes it flows through, i.e. Raven, Corset, Ward, and Skead Lakes. Also part of the park is a tract of land south of Wendigo Lake that includes Beaver, Clear, Crystal, Little Moose, Miller, and Skeletonpup Lakes. The Larder River inside the park is characterized by scenic boreal forest, cliffs, outcrops, and plateaus.

The park was originally established in 1985 and had 2,509 hectares (6,200 acres), only including the river corridor from Raven Lake to Upper Wendigo Lake, as well as the area around Clear Lake. In 2002, the park was extended to the south of Wendigo Lake by 1,535 hectares (3,790 acres).

The park provides important feeding and calving habitats for moose and nesting sites for birds of prey. Fish species found in the park include brook trout, golden shiner, northern pike, pumpkinseed, rock bass, spottail shiner, white sucker, and yellow perch.

The Larder River Waterway Provincial Park is a non-operating park. There are no facilities or services provided.

== See also ==
- List of rivers of Ontario
