= Kerr Addison Mines Ltd. =

Canadian mining company

Kerr Addison Mines Limited
- Logo (1981)
- Industry: Mining and natural gas
- Predecessor: Associated Goldfields; Canadian Associated Goldfields; Kerr-Addison Gold Mines; Proprietary Mines Limited
- Founded: 18 November 1963
- Defunct: 31 December 1998
- Fate: Acquired by Noranda Mines
- Headquarters: Toronto

Kerr Addison Mines Ltd was a Toronto-based mining and gas company that owned various mines throughout Canada, including the Agnew Lake Mine, the Kerr-Addison Mine and Chesterville gold mine.

In the 1960s, Kerr Addison was Canada's largest gold producer.

The injury of a snowmobiler on company property in 1975 led to a Supreme Court of Canada judgement setting precedent for future Occupier's Liability cases in Canada.

== History ==
In 1904, H. L. Kerr was prospecting for uranium around Larder Lake and identified an area that he wanted to return to. Kerr spoke to Bill Addison, who visited the area in 1906. Shortly afterwards they formally registered their claim, formed Kerr Addison Gold Mines, and started the Kerr-Addison Mine. Production was slow in initial years, and ownership of the mine officially changed hands three times, with the third owner being Associated Goldfields Limited, buying the mine in 1917. Associated Goldfields Limited became Canadian Associated Goldfields in 1921 and went bankrupt in 1928. Proprietary Mines Limited was then formed, and took over the mines, while also buying up additional sixteen claims. Kerr-Addison Mines Limited was incorporated in 1963, out of a merger of Kerr-Addison Gold Mines, Anglo-Huronian, Bouzan Mines and Prospector Airways and bought the Kerr-Addison mine from Canadian Associated Goldfields Limited in 1937. In 1957, the company bought the neighbouring Chesterville gold mine.

In 1978, the executive vice president was P. S. Cross, WIliam James was the CEO, and W. S. Row was the chairman of the board.

As of 1982, Ian D. Bayer was the president and CEO and major shareholder.

=== Influence on Occupier's Liability in Canada ===
The Supreme Court of Canada made a precedent-setting tort judgement in the Occupier's Liability case brought by Peter Veinot against Kerr Addison Mines Limited in 1975. Veinot sustained serious facial injuries from hitting an iron bar while travelling on his snowmobile on Kerr Addison's land.

== Activities ==
Activities included mining and processing zinc, gold, and uranium, as well as extracting natural gas.

=== Surveying ===
Between 1959 and 1961, along with other mining companies, Kerr-Addison undertook aeromagnetic surveys throughout northwestern Ontario.

=== Assets ===
==== Gold mining in McGarry ====
Kerr Addison owned the Kerr-Addison Mine near Larder Lake. Between 1938 and 1996, it produced more than 12 million ounces of gold, and employed 2,500 people. In 1964 Kerr Addison was Canada's largest gold producer, having produced $256,745,022 of gold from 28,516,503 tons of ore milled.

==== Uranium mining at Agnew Lake ====
Kerr Addison had a 90% ownership stake in Agnew Lake Uranium Mine taking over ownership from New Thurbois Mines Ltd and developing it in conjunction with Quebec Mattagami Minerals.

From 1965 to 1967 undertook drilling before developing the site.

The company produced 1.1 million pounds of uranium oxide out of 2.8 million tons of ore between 1977 and 1983. Their clients included Swedish Nuclear Fuel.

==== Other assets and revenue ====
Kerr Addison had a 75% ownership stake in Mogul Ireland Limited as well as mining assets in British Columbia and Alberta.

As of 31 Dec 1977, the company had assets worth $57 million.

Revenue, selected years
Year	Revenue
1974	$37.0 million
1978	$40.8 million
1983	$47.5 million

== See also ==
- History of Larder Lake
- Cobalt: Cradle of the Demon Metals, Birth of a Mining Superpower
