= V-Town =

V-Town may refer to:

- Virginiatown, Ontario, Canada
- Visalia, California, United States
