= Chief Tonene Lake =

Canadian lake

- Tournene Lake (former name)
- Location within Ontario
- Location: Timiskaming District, Ontario, Canada
- Coordinates: 48°07′00″N 79°38′30″W
- Type: Lake
- Part of: Saint Lawrence River drainage basin
- Max. length: 0.8 km (0.50 mi)
- Surface elevation: 300 m (980 ft)

Chief Tonene Lake (previously Tournene Lake and Lac Tournene) is a lake in the Timiskaming District of Ontario, Canada.

== Location ==
Chief Tonene Lake is located in the Timiskaming District of Ontario, Canada. It is situated approximately equidistant between Virginiatown and the township of Larder Lake. It is located immediately south of on the Golden Highway element of Ontario Highway 66, south of Bear Lake and north of Larder Lake.

Geologically, the lake is immediately south of the Larder Lake-Cadillac fault line.

== History and nomenclature ==
The lake was previously known as Tournene Lake and Lac Tournene (in French), until 2016 when it was officially re-named. The lake is named after Ignace Tonené, the chief of the Teme-Augama Anishnabai First Nations community.

== See also ==
- List of lakes of Ontario
- McGarry, Ontario
