= Raven Lake =

Freshwater body in Canada

Lake Raven
- Ontario
- Location: Rouyn-Noranda in Quebec and Timiskaming District in Ontario
- Coordinates: 48°01′14″N 79°28′55″W
- Lake type: Natural
- Primary inflows: Larder River, discharge of Lake Buies (coming from Quebec), discharge of 4 Boundary Lakes (straddled between Ontario and Quebec boundary)
- Primary outflows: Larder River
- Basin countries: Canada
- Max. length: 7.0 km (7,000 m)
- Max. width: 0.6 km (600 m)
- Surface elevation: 256 m (840 ft)

Raven Lake is a freshwater body of Canada that straddles the boundary between Northwest in the province of Quebec, in Rouyn-Noranda (sector of Montbeillard), in administrative region of Abitibi-Témiscamingue, and Northeastern Ontario, in the District of Timiskaming (township of McFadden Geo). The dividing line between the two provinces is in the northeastern part of Raven Lake.

Forestry is the main economic activity of the sector; recreational tourism activities, second. The resort is developed on the North Shore and in a bay in the Southeast, close to the south side of the largest island of this body of water. This hydrographic slope is served on the north side by Route 117 (East–west direction).

Annually, the lake surface is generally frozen from mid-November to late April, however, the period of safe ice circulation is usually from mid-December to mid-April.

== Geography ==
The main hydrographic slopes near Raven Lake are:

- North side: Boundary Lakes, Labyrinthe Lake, Dasserat River;
- East side: Hébert Lake, Dufay Lake, Granville River;
- South side: Laberge River, Loutre Creek;
- West side: Larder River, Larder Lake, Sharp Creek.

This body of water, which has the shape of a large V open to the Southeast, includes Hannigan Bay (Northwest shore).

The mouth of Lake Raven is located at:

- 4.0 kilometres (2.5 mi) Southeast of Larder Lake;
- 4.9 kilometres (3.0 mi) West of the Quebec - Ontario border;
- 27.4 kilometres (17.0 mi) Northeast of the mouth of the Larder River (confluence with the Blanche River (Lake Timiskaming);
- 51.2 kilometres (31.8 mi) Northwest of the Blanche River (Lake Timiskaming)

From the mouth of Raven Lake, the Larder River flows over 51.0 kilometres (31.7 mi), forming a hook to the west, before spilling onto the northeast shore of the Blanche River (Lake Timiskaming). The latter flows southeast to Lake Timiskaming, which straddles the Ontario - Quebec border.

== Toponymy ==
The term "Raven" is a family name of English origin.

The name "Lac Raven" was officialized on December 5, 1968, by the Commission de toponymie du Québec, when it was created.

== See also ==
- Larder River (Ontario), a watercourse
- Blanche River (Lake Timiskaming), a watercourse
- Lake Temiscaming, a body of water
- Ottawa River, a watercourse
- Rouyn-Noranda, a Regional County Municipality (RCM)
- District of Timiskaming, an administrative region of Ontario
- List of lakes in Canada
