= Larder Lake (Ontario) =

- Lake Present
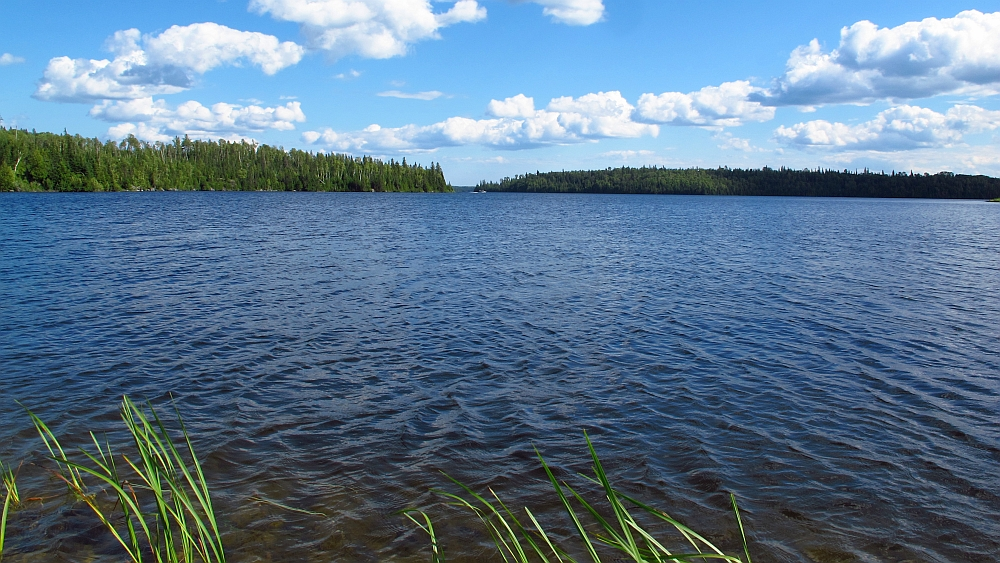

- Location in Ontario
- Location: Timiskaming District, Ontario
- Coordinates: 48°05′07″N 79°38′32″W
- Type: Lake
- Part of: Saint Lawrence River drainage basin
- Primary outflows: Larder River
- Basin countries: Canada
- Max. length: 12.5 kilometres (7.8 mi)
- Max. width: 6.3 kilometres (3.9 mi)
- Surface elevation: 274 metres (899 ft)

Larder Lake is a freshwater lake in Timiskaming District in Northeastern Ontario, Canada. The lake straddles the incorporated (municipal) townships of Larder Lake and McGarry and geographic McFadden Township. It is part of the Saint Lawrence River drainage basin and is the source of the Larder River.

== Nomenclature ==
The Lake was previously known as Lake Present, but in 1906 was informally renamed by the group of prospectors who later opened Chesterville gold mine.

== Geography ==
Larder lake has two large arms, Southwest Arm and Northeast Arm, and four bays: Fitzpatrick Bay in the southwest; and Dublin Bay, Northwest Bay and Spoon Bay at the northwest. A 5.5-kilometre (3.4 mi) long peninsula extends in the middle of the lake from south to north up to the Big Narrows, separating the lake into two parts. The major islands include Big Pete Island, Island CC and Island U.

Larder Lake has five named inflows: Sharp Creek and Benson Creek at the southwest; Pancake Creek to Northwest Bay; Bear Creek to the tip of Northeast Arm; and Milky Creek at the east. The primary outflow is the Larder River, at the southeast, which flows via the Blanche River, Lake Timiskaming and the Ottawa River to the Saint Lawrence River.

The community of Larder Lake (in the eponymous municipal township of Larder Lake) is located on the northwest shore of Spoon Bay, and the communities of Virginiatown and Kearns, both part of municipal McGarry township, are located at the northeast end of Northeast Arm.

Ontario Highway 66 travels in an east-west direction along the north side of the lake, and Ontario Highway 624 travels in a north-south direction along on the west side of the lake.

== Impact of mining ==
There are gold mines around Larder Lake, including Kerr-Addison Mine. The lake has been contaminated by mine tailings. In 1992, the Ontario Ministry of the Environment fined mining company Deak Resources $50,000 due to polluting effluent discharged into the lake. Pollutants included heavy metals and cyanide. In 1994, a study by Environment Canada documented "high concentrates" of nickel, gold, copper, lead and zinc in Larder Lake.

== Climate ==
The lake surface is generally frozen from mid-November to late April; however, the period of safe ice circulation is usually from mid-December to mid-April.

== See also ==
- Chief Tonene Lake
