= Bad Luck Bank Robbers =

2006 non-fiction book by Grace Barker

- Author: Grace Barker
- Genre: Crime, non-fiction
- Publisher: Dawn
- Publication date: 2006
- Publication place: Canada
- ISBN: 978-0969629825

Bad Luck Bank Robbers is a 2006 book by Canadian historian Grace Barker about the Havelock Bank Robbery.

The book documents the robbery, the police chase, the escape, the search and capture of the five robbers, and their trail. It inspired a 2016 play by the same name.

== Author ==
Grace Barker is a Canadian author based in Campbellford, Ontario. She was supported by former police officer Clive Naismith of Trent Valley Archives during the research of the book.

Barker previously wrote Timber Empire: The Exploits of the Entrepreneurial Boyds, a historical account of lumber baron Mossom Boyd and his family.

== Synopsis ==
The book documents the Havelock Bank Robbery of the Toronto Dominion Bank in 1961 and the police chase of the robbers. The book describes the two years of planning that went into the robbery, learning the patterns of the staff and the timing of the managers vacation. It details the limited capacity of the local police force. It also talks about the errors made by the robbers, how the local butcher spotted their vehicle and the series of unlucky events that slowed their escape, including a bulldozer blocking road an the breakdown of another vehicle on a single lane road. The book describes how the delays allowed the police to catch up with the robbers, the subsequent gun fight and then the robbers escape into the Ontario wilderness. It details the police-led search, the capture and then the trail of four of the robbers, and the death in custody of the fifth. The book ends by discussing the mystery of the missing $230,000.

== Critical reception ==
Kelsey Powell writing for Kawartha Now praised the author's evidence gathering and described the book as a "must read" for history fans.

The book inspired a play by the same name that premiered at the 4th Line Theatre in 2016.
