= Chesterville gold mine =

Gold mine in McGarry, Ontario, Canada

Chesterville Gold Mine
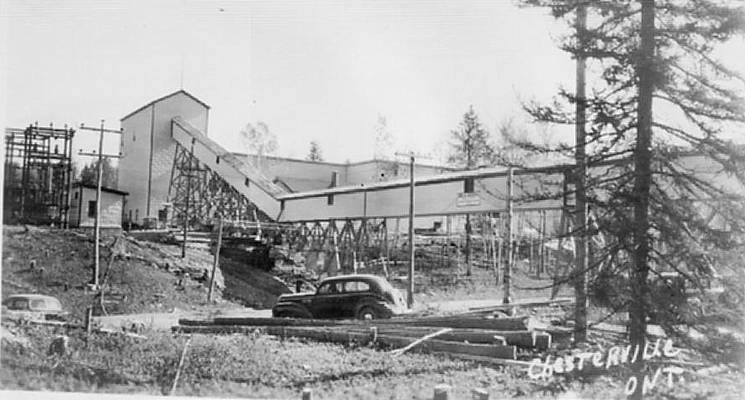
- The mine in 1939

- Location within Ontario
- Location: McGarry, Ontario, Canada; 48°08′20″N 79°34′26″W
- Products: Gold, silver
- Production: 11,162kg gold, 603kg silver
- Type: Underground
- Greatest depth: 854 meters
- Discovered: 1906
- Opened: 1939
- Closed: 1952
- Company: Chesterville Larder Lake Gold Mining Company (until 1957), Kerr Addison Mines Ltd. (from 1957)

Chesterville Gold Mine was a gold mine located in McGarry, Ontario.

Gold was discovered at the location in 1906 and the Chesterville Larder Lake Gold Mining Company was incorporated in 1907. Logistical and financial challenges delayed the start of mining until 1939.

The mine produced 11,162kg of gold and 603kg of silver before closing in 1952. Ownership of the mine transferred to Kerr Addison Mines Ltd in 1957.

== Location ==
The mine was located west of the previously-established Kerr-Addison Mine in the community of Kearns, in what is now in the township of McGarry. The mine is located next to what used to be known by Indigenous peoples as Lake Present, but since renamed by the mine's founders as Larder Lake, near Mount Cheminis.

The mine's grounds covered 753 acres.

== Discovery and incorporation ==
In 1906, the land that became the mine was staked by a group of friends from Chesterville, Ontario: dairy farmer Herman Hummel, Jesse Elliot, Wesley Barkley, and store-keeper J. T. Kearns. Hummel spotted a white formation in a rock embedded in a cliff face, which he retrieved, cracked open and found that it contained gold.

The group incorporated the Chesterville Larder Lake Gold Mining Company on March 20, 1907 with J.T. Kearns' son L. J. Kearns as president, J. B. Streit as vice-president and E. V. Oag as the company secretary and treasurer. J. T. Kearns was a director at the time of registration, and appointed as company treasurer later. The company's registered office was in room 404 of 330 Bay Street, Toronto.

Initially, the company struggled to attract the necessary financing; the location of the ore was isolated, lacking road access, making transportation and the construction of a mill expensive. The relatively lower gold value at the time, negatively impacted the company's ability to raise finances.

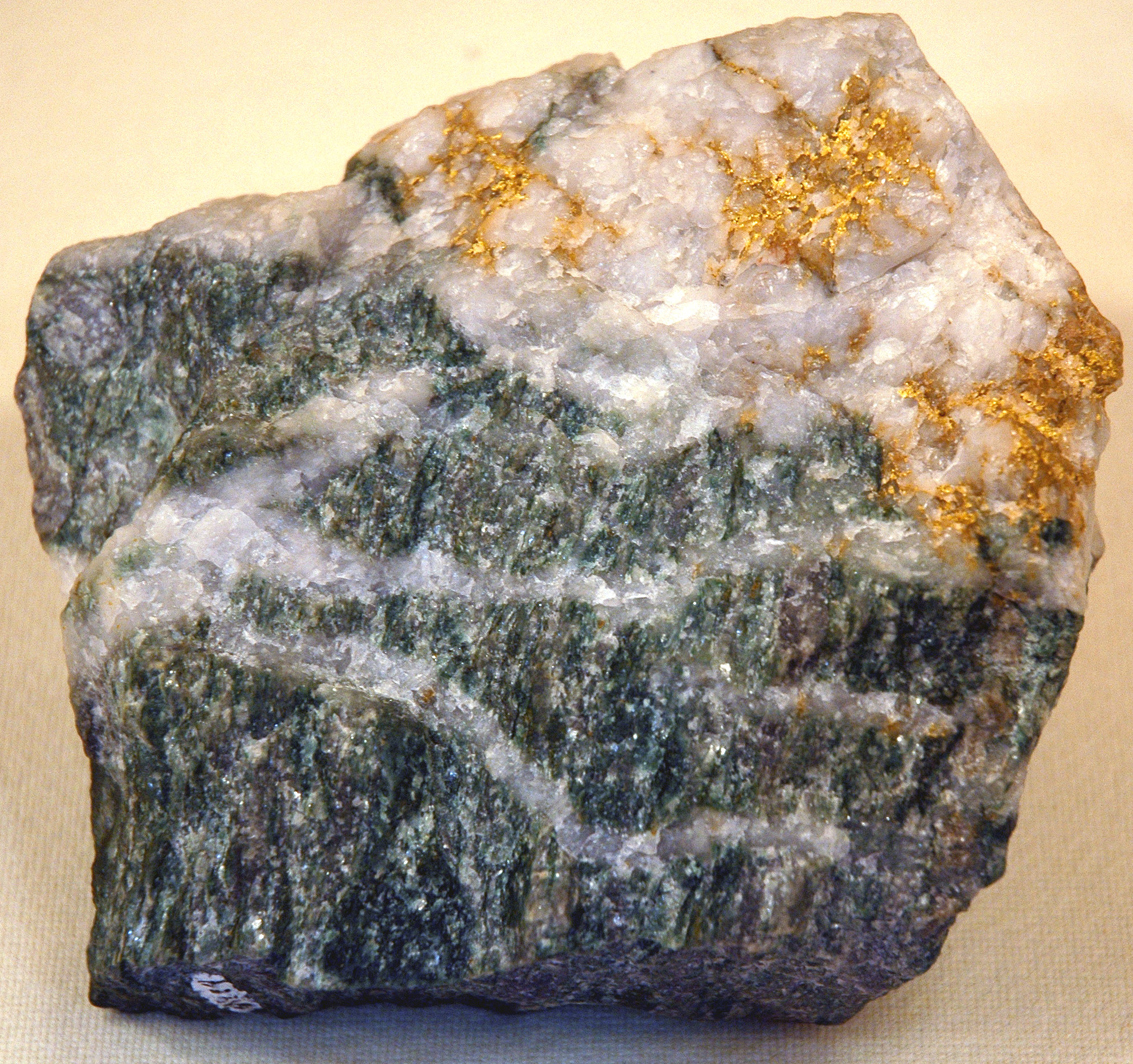
Gold ore from the mine

In the 1920s, the company launched a muskrat farm, the costs of operating the business prompted Hummel to sell his share of the ownership.

== Start of mining ==
Diamond drilling in 1937 identified more gold ore, and a 500-ton-capacity mill was built in 1938.

The mine opened in June 1939. The first gold bar was produced on July 29, 1939. Later that year, the mine produced $67,244 of gold in September, and $96,215 of gold in October.

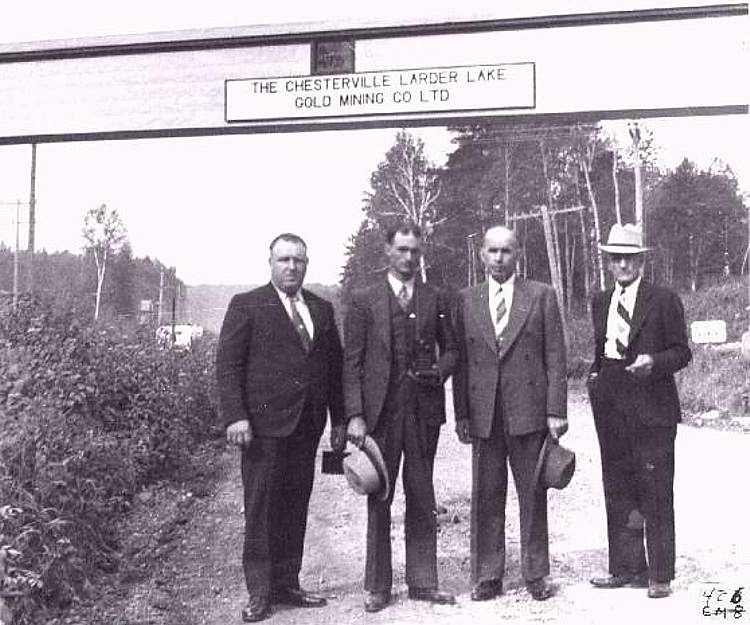
Harvey Barkley (son of Wes Barkley), Don Cross (Wes Barkley's son-in-law), Arnott Johnston (Wes Barkley's son-in-law) and John Barkley (mine co-owner) at the mine, July 29, 1939 on the day the mine poured its first gold bar.

The mine's shaft reached a depth of 854 meters and the eighteen levels of the mine went to a maximum depth of 835 meters. The majority of the gold was found in the upper 400 metres of the mine.

Miner Percy Robinson (aged 23) was killed at the mine in July 1940. In 1944, the mine employed 166 men. In 1945 the mine's fatal accident rate was categorised in the lowest of the six brackets of categorisation used by the Government of Ontario, with an average accident rate between zero and thirty fatal accidents per year per thousand persons employed.

In 1944, daily ore production averaged at 350 tons, increasing to 487 in 1945 once more men had returned from the Second World War.

== Closure and legacy ==
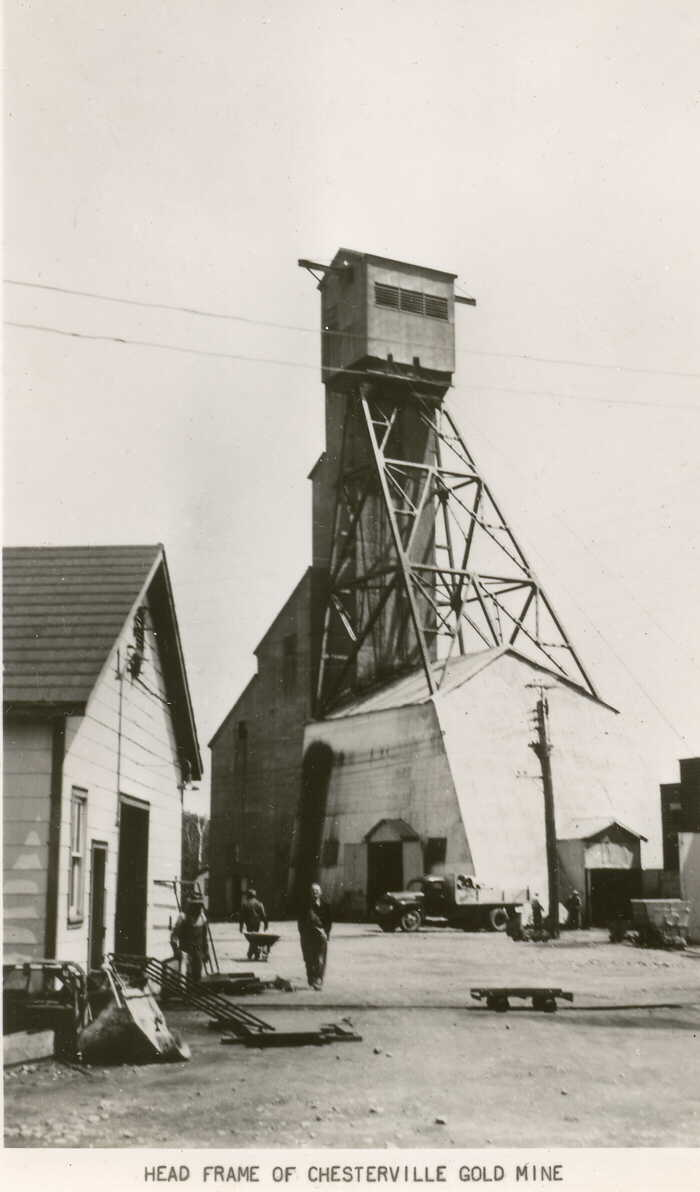
The mine head frame in 1950

The mine closed in 1952. In total, it produced 2,957,820 tonnes of ore at 3.77 grammes of gold per tonne, totalling 11,162kg of gold. The mine also produced 603kg of silver.

The ownership of the mine transferred to Kerr Addison Mines Ltd in 1957. Tailings from the mine remain on site at the northeast edge of Larder Lake.

== See also ==
- List of gold mines in Canada
