= Havelock Bank Robbery =

1961 Canadian bank robbery

- Location: Toronto-Dominion Bank, Havelock, Ontario
- Date: August 31, 1961
- Attack type: Robbery
- Weapons: M1 carbine, revolvers
- Deaths: 0
- Injuries: 0
- Perpetrators: Yvon Lalonde, Roger Poirier, Jean Claude Lalonde, Roger Martel, Hermyle Lalonde
- Motive: Robbery

The Havelock Bank Robbery was a 1961 armed robbery of bank bonds plus $230,000 cash from the Toronto-Dominion Bank branch in Havelock, Ontario.

The five robbers were arrested; one died in custody and the other four were found guilty. The money was never found.

== Background ==
31 August 1961 was the pay day of three local mining companies, and therefore a day in which the Havelock branch of Toronto-Dominion Bank would have more money than usual.

== Robbery ==
During the early morning of 31 August, four men entered the basement window of the Toronto-Dominion Bank in the small town of Havelock, Ontario, while another waited in the get-away car. The assailants waited for staff to arrive, and once they did at 9:15am, the armed robbers politely demanded bank worker William Lindup to open the safe and put the contents into a duffel bag, fleeing minutes later with $230,000 of cash plus bank bonds. The five robbers were armed with revolvers and an M1 carbine semi-automatic rifle.

As they waited, the neighbouring butcher spotted their Buick vehicle, felt it was suspicious and noted down the license plate.

The robbers fled the scene in their vehicle, their escape was initially blocked by a bulldozer. Police chased them along rural roads on the Canadian Shield, and again their escape was delayed when a car with a punctured tire blocked a single-lane road. After hitting a rock and abandoning their vehicles, the robbers exchanged gunfire with the police and escaped into the wilderness east of the Crowe River.

The Ontario Provincial Police launched a search of the area, involving 75 officers, and captured the suspects on 3 and 4 September near Ontario Highway 62. Yvon Lalonde and one other robber were spotted on 3 September by lumber mill operator Martin Murphy, and Lalonde was arrested by police hours later. On 4 September, three suspects were found by Frederick Andrews of Stirling, one of many civilians who were helping the police with the search. Police constable John Martin then arrested three men, before they were taken to Millbridge. They were initially held in Peterborough County jail, later transferring them to Whitby jail.

One of the robbers died of a heart attack while in custody. The remaining four were found guilty after nine days of trial starting in January 1962.

As of 2014, The Royal Canadian Mint stated that none of the money was found in circulation. According to The Toronto Star, the robbery "was considered one of the biggest bank robberies in Canadian history."

Despite two years of planning, the series of delays in their escape resulted in them becoming known as the "bad luck bank robbers".

== Robbers ==
All five robbers, known as the Red Hood Gang, were French-Canadians from Montreal, Quebec. Jean Claude Lalonde, Yvon Lalonde, Roger Poirier, and Roger Martel were found guilty, Hermyle Lalonde died before the trial.

== In popular culture ==
The robbery was the subject of the 2006 book Bad Luck Bank Robbers, by Grace Barker, and a 2014 play produced by the 4th Line Theatre also called Bad Luck Bank Robbers. The play was written by Alex Poch-Goldin and directed by Kim Blackwell.

The township of Wollaston, Ontario, changed the name of the street where the robbers abandoned their vehicle to Bank Robbers Lane.

== See also ==
- List of bank robbers and robberies
- Virginiatown bank robbery
