= 4th Line Theatre =

Canadian theatre company

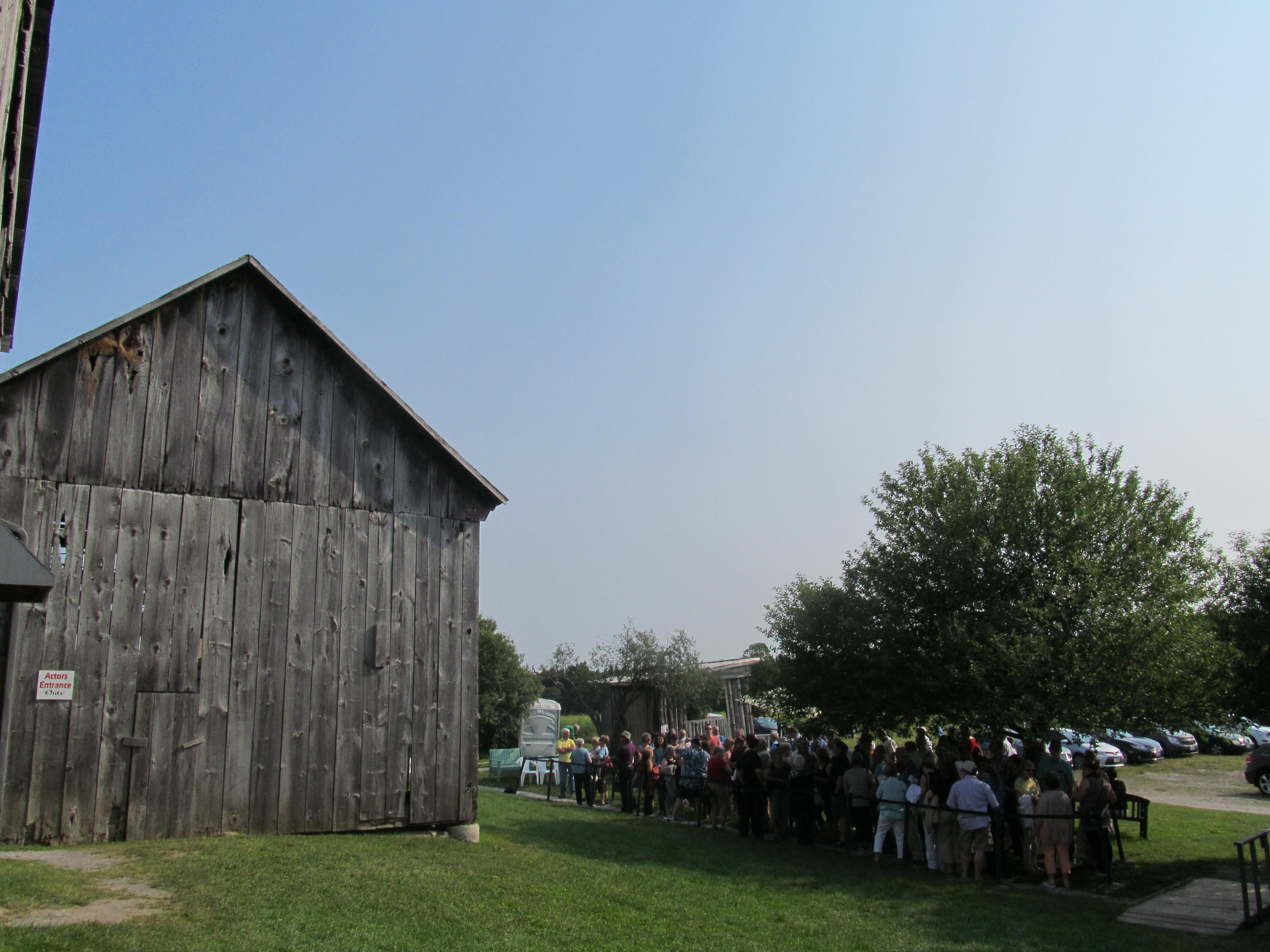

The 4th Line Theatre is a Canadian theatre company located near the small town of Millbrook, Ontario in the township of Cavan Monaghan.

== History ==
The 4th Line Theatre was founded by Robert Winslow in 1992, after his mother's passing left him with the 150-acre farm property. Robert launched the theatre with his original work The Cavan Blazers, and has directed and written many of the plays.

In 2014, Winslow’s long-time collaborator Kim Blackwell took on the role of Managing Artistic Director as Winslow transitioned out of his position as Artistic Director.

== Productions since 2005 ==
=== 2005 ===
- That Summer by David French
- Doctor Barnardo's Children by Ian McLachlan and Robert Winslow

=== 2006 ===
- The Art of Silent Killing by Shane Peacock
- Doctor Barnardo's Children by Ian McLachlan and Robert Winslow (second production)

=== 2007 ===
- Beautiful Lady, Tell Me by Shirley Barrie
- Schoolhouse by Leanna Brodie

=== 2008 ===
- Schoolhouse by Leanna Brodie (second production)
- The Last Green Hill by Dale Hamilton and Robert Winslow

=== 2009 ===
- Welcome Death by Robert Winslow
- The Right Road to Pontypool by Alex Poch-Goldin

=== 2010 ===
- Eldorado Town - The Port Hope Play by Charles Hayter
- The Right Road to Pontypool by Alex Poch-Goldin (second production)

=== 2011 ===
- The Cavan Blazers by Robert Winslow (second production)
- The Berlin Blues by Drew Hayden Taylor

=== 2012 ===
- Queen Marie by Shirley Barrie
- St Francis of Millbrook by Sky Gilbert

=== 2013 ===
- The Winslows of Derryvore by Robert Winslow (second production)
- The Real McCoy by Andrew Moodie

=== 2014 ===
- Wounded Soldiers by Ian McLachlan and Robert Winslow
- Doctor Barnardo's Children by Ian McLachlan and Robert Winslow (third production)

=== 2015 ===
- The Bad Luck Bank Robbers by Alex Poch-Goldin (inspired by the 2006 book Bad Luck Bank Robbers about the Havelock Bank Robbery)
- Gimme That Prime Time Religion by Robert Winslow et al.

=== 2016 ===
- The Hero of Hunter Street by Maja Ardal
- The Bad Luck Bank Robbers by Alex Poch-Goldin (second production)

=== 2017 ===
- Bombers: Reaping the Whirlwind by David S. Craig
- The History of Drinking in Cavan by Robert Winslow

=== 2018 ===
- Crow Hill The Telephone Play by Ian McLachlan and Robert Winslow
- Who Killed Snow White? by Judith Thompson

=== 2019 ===
- Bloom: A Rock ‘n’ Roll Fable by Beau Dixon
- Carmel by Robert Winslow and Ian MacLachlan
- The Fool of Cavan: A Christmas Caper by Lindy Finlan

=== 2020 ===
- Bedtime Stories and Other Horrifying Tales by Kim Blackwell and Lindy Finlan

=== 2021 ===
- The Verandah Society by Kate Suhr and Megan Murphy

=== 2022 ===
- The Great Shadow by Alex Poch-Goldin
- Wishful Seeing by Maja Ardal

=== 2023 ===
- The Tilco Strike by D’Arcy Jenish
- The Cavan Blazers by Robert Winslow

=== 2024 ===
- Onion Skins and Peach Fuzz: The Farmerettes by Alison Lawrence
- Jim Watts, Girl Reporter by Beverley Cooper

=== 2025 ===
- The Housekeeper by Ian McLachlan and Robert Winslow
- Wild Irish Geese by Megan Murphy

=== 2026 ===
- Schoolhouse by Leanna Brodie (third production)
- Wild Irish Geese by Megan Murphy (second production)
