= McGarry, Ontario =

McGarry
- Township
- Township of McGarry
- Virginiatown

- Location within Ontario
- Coordinates: 48°08′47″N 79°34′14″W
- Country: Canada
- Province: Ontario
- District: Timiskaming
- Incorporated: 1946 (Improvement District)
- Incorporated: 1962 (Township)

Government
  - Type: Township
  - Mayor: Bonita Culhane
  - Fed. riding: Kapuskasing—Timmins—Mushkegowuk
  - Prov. riding: Timiskaming—Cochrane

Area
  - Land: 85.62 km^{2} (33.06 sq mi)
- Elevation: 327 m (1,073 ft)

Population (2021)
  - Total: 579
  - Density: 6.8/km^{2} (18/sq mi)
- Time zone: UTC-5 (EST)
  - Summer (DST): UTC-4 (EDT)
- Postal code: P0K 1X0
- Area codes: 705, 249
- Website: www.mcgarry.ca

McGarry is an incorporated township in Timiskaming District in Northeastern Ontario, Canada. It includes the communities of Virginiatown and Kearns. The township borders with Quebec to the east, along Highway 66 between Kirkland Lake and Rouyn-Noranda. The northern border of the township forms part of the border between Timiskaming District and Cochrane District. Highway 66 was rerouted in 2017 because of concerns that aging mine shafts under the road could cause it to collapse.

J. T. Kearns (after whom one of the communities was named) staked a claim in 1906, which became the Chesterville gold mine (1938–1952). An 854-metre (2,802 ft) shaft connected 20 levels, and its 500-ton stamp mill produced a total of 458,880 ounces of gold. The Kerr-Addison Gold mine started in 1936, and employed 1,456 people by 1959. In 1960, the mine produced the most gold in the Western Hemisphere, and the 10 millionth ounce of gold was produced in 1982.

== History ==
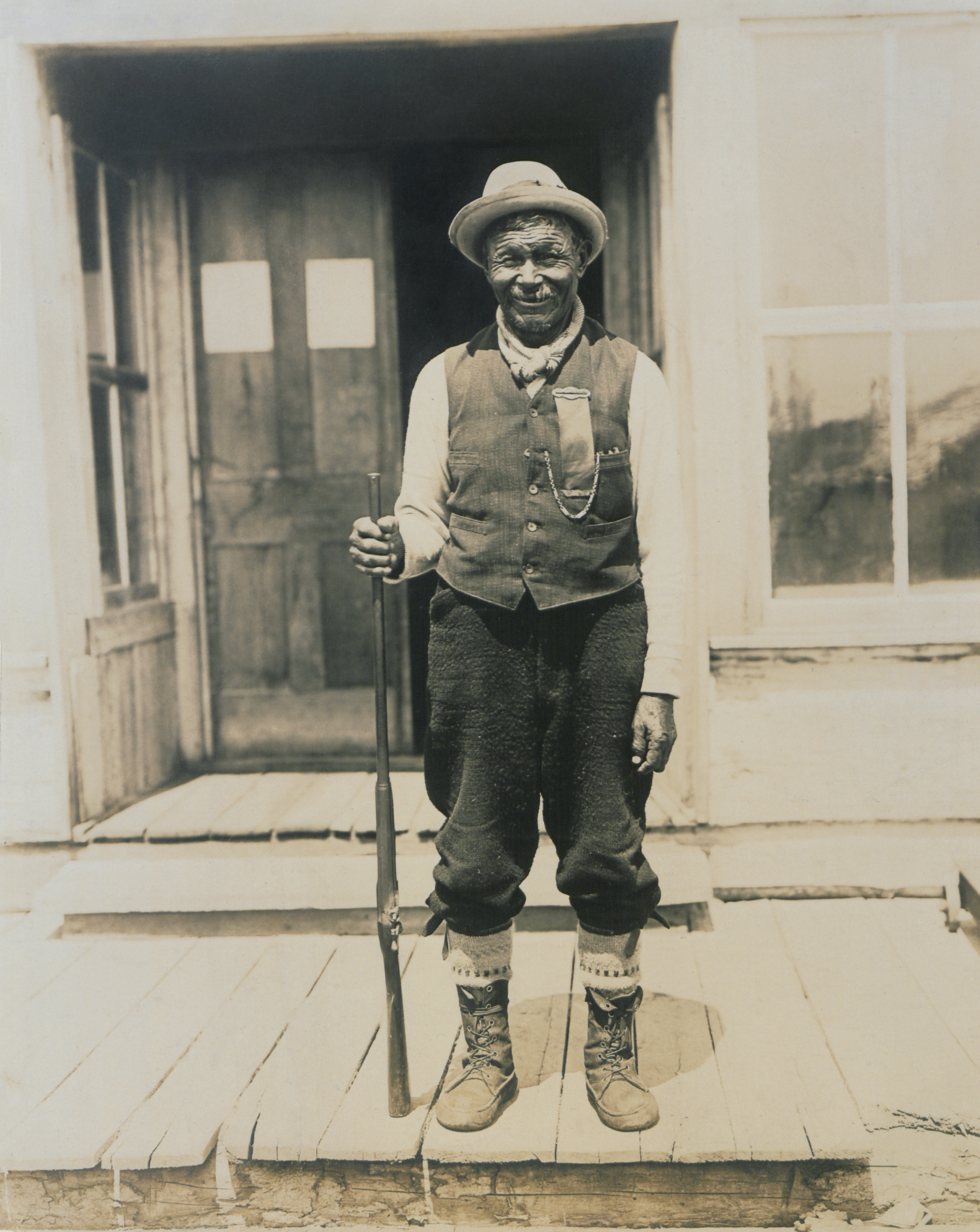
Chief Ignace Tonené

Gold in the area was originally reported in the late 1800s by Chief Ignace Tonené of the Temagami First Nation. He staked a claim near the north arm of Larder Lake but claimed it was stolen. He reported it, but Indian Affairs was unable to help. Tonené's claim was jumped by European settlers and later developed into the Kerr-Addison Mine. Adjacent to the Kerr-Addison Mine, the Chesterville gold mine was developed, operating from 1939 until 1952.

Virginiatown was built to house the Kerr Addison workers. In 1946, McGarry was incorporated as an Improvement District, which changed to Township in 1962.

On December 21, 1972, masked thieves successfully robbed the Virginiatown Canadian Imperial Bank of Commerce on the Kerr Addison miners' payday. The robbers were never captured.

In 2016, the nearby Tournene Lake (or Lac Tournene in French), was officially re-named as Chief Tonene Lake.

In 2026, Cadillac Mines proposed an open pit mine that would force the relocation of approximately 500 residents of Virgiatown.

=== Beaverhouse First Nation ===
In 2018, Beaverhouse First Nation submitted a claim to the Government of Ontario, asserting the community is a distinct First Nation and did not sign Treaty 9, or any other treaty. On April 19, 2022, Beaverhouse First Nation was officially recognized as a First Nation under Section 35 of Canada’s Constitution.

== Demographics ==
In the 2021 Census of Population conducted by Statistics Canada, McGarry had a population of 579 living in 289 of its 333 total private dwellings, a change of −4.9% from its 2016 population of 609. With a land area of 85.62 km^{2} (33.06 sq mi), it had a population density of 6.8/km^{2} (17.5/sq mi) in 2021.

Canada census – McGarry community profile

	2021	2016	2011
Population	579 (-4.9% from 2016)	609 (2.4% from 2011)	595 (-11.7% from 2006)
Land area	85.62 km^{2} (33.06 sq mi)	86.67 km^{2} (33.46 sq mi)	86.72 km^{2} (33.48 sq mi)
Population density	6.8/km^{2} (18/sq mi)	7.0/km^{2} (18/sq mi)	6.9/km^{2} (18/sq mi)
Median age	55.2 (M: 57.6, F: 53.6)	54.7 (M: 55.5, F: 53.9)	51.7 (M: 52.9, F: 50.6)
Private dwellings	333 (total) 289 (occupied)	345 (total)	360 (total)
Median household income	$54,800	$47,232	$29,360

References: 2021 2016 2011

Historical census populations – McGarry, Ontario

Year	Pop.	±%
1951	2,362	—
1956	2,613	+10.6%
1961	2,998	+14.7%
1966	2,034	−32.2%
1971	1,757	−13.6%
1976	1,629	−7.3%
1981	1,338	−17.9%
1986	1,237	−7.5%

Year	Pop.	±%
1991	1,139	−7.9%
1996	1,015	−10.9%
2001	787	−22.5%
2006	674	−14.4%
2011	595	−11.7%
2016	609	+2.4%
2021	579	−4.9%

Population counts are not adjusted for boundary changes.
Source: Statistics Canada

Mother tongue (2021):

- English as first language: 56.0%
- French as first language: 37.9%
- English and French as first languages: 3.4%
- Other as first language: 1.7%

== Economy ==
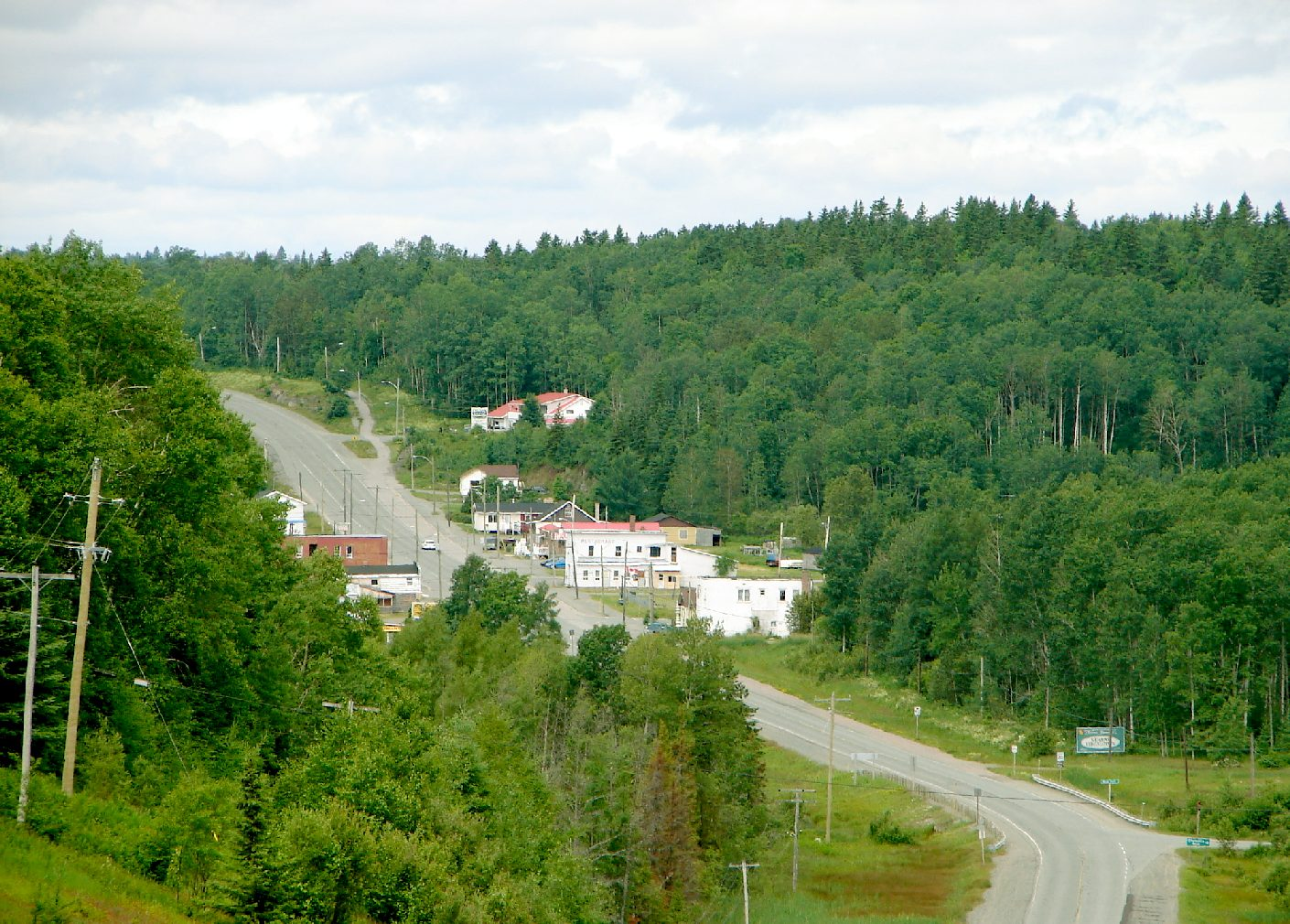
Kearns and Highway 66

McGarry's economy has historically been supported by the mining industry, and struggled when the mines were not producing.

The Armistice Gold mine was purchased by Bonterra Resources from Kerr Resources in 2016, and gold exploration and modelling was done to update the resource to a National Instrument 43-101 Compliant Resource.

Gold Candle Ltd. and investors purchased the historic Chesterville Gold Mines and Kerr Addison Gold Mines property in 2016, and conducted a feasibility study and gold exploration with Canadian Exploration Services Limited on the old Chesterville Gold Mines and Kerr Addison Gold Mines property.

== Tourism ==
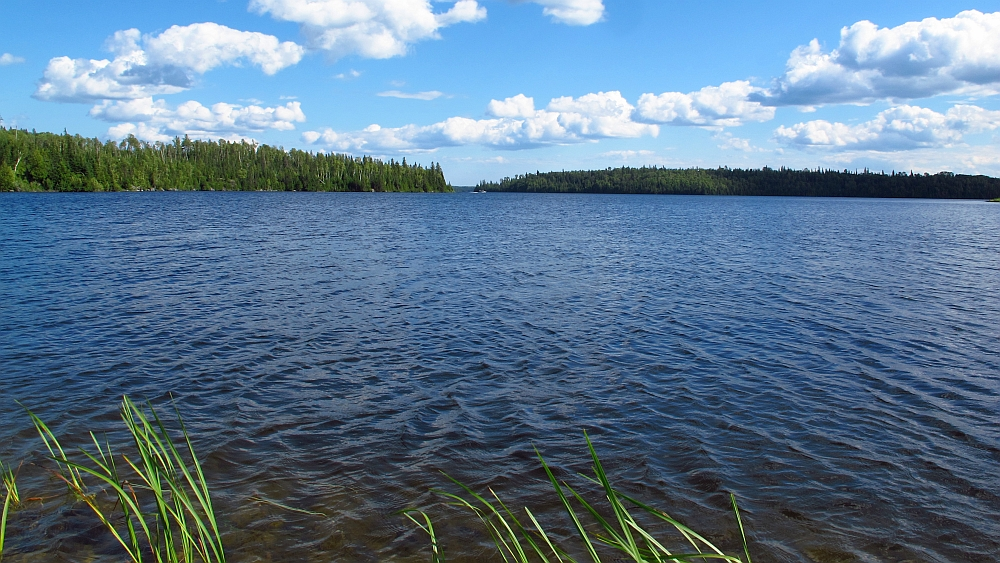
Larder Lake

McGarry hosts several events, including an annual fish derby at Larder Lake, and a Labour Day weekend music event at the McGarry community centre. Gem Lake Maple Bedrock Provincial Park is located in McGarry Township. Sport fishing is permitted within Gem Lake Maple Bedrock Provincial Park. McGarry Township Forest Conservation Reserve, shared with McFadden Township, is located in McGarry Township.

== Notable people ==
- J. T. Kearns
- Ignace Tonené

== See also ==
- List of townships in Ontario
- List of francophone communities in Ontario
- Deak Resources
- Larder Lake, Ontario
- Mount Cheminis (nearby inselberg)
