= Mount Cheminis =

Geological feature in Quebec, Canada

- Mont Chaudron or Sugar-Loaf Mountain
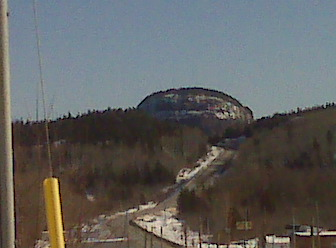
- 2009 photo

Highest point
- Coordinates: 48.1394440°N 79.5102780°W

Geography
- Location within Quebec
- Topo map: NTS 32D4 Larder Lake

Mount Cheminis (also known as Mont Chaudron, and Sugar-Loaf Mountain) is an inselberg/monadnock located in Quebec, Canada, near the Ontario border.

It is one of the highest peaks in the Abitibi-Témiscamingue region, a tourist attraction and a place that has spiritual significance for Indigenous peoples.

== Nomenclature ==
Mount Cheminis is also known as Mont Chaudron, and Sugar-Loaf Mountain.

According to Gloria MacKenzie and Marcia Brown of Beaverhouse First Nation band office, the name is derived from the Chamminis, which translates into English as the "place of healing or healers."

== Geology and location ==
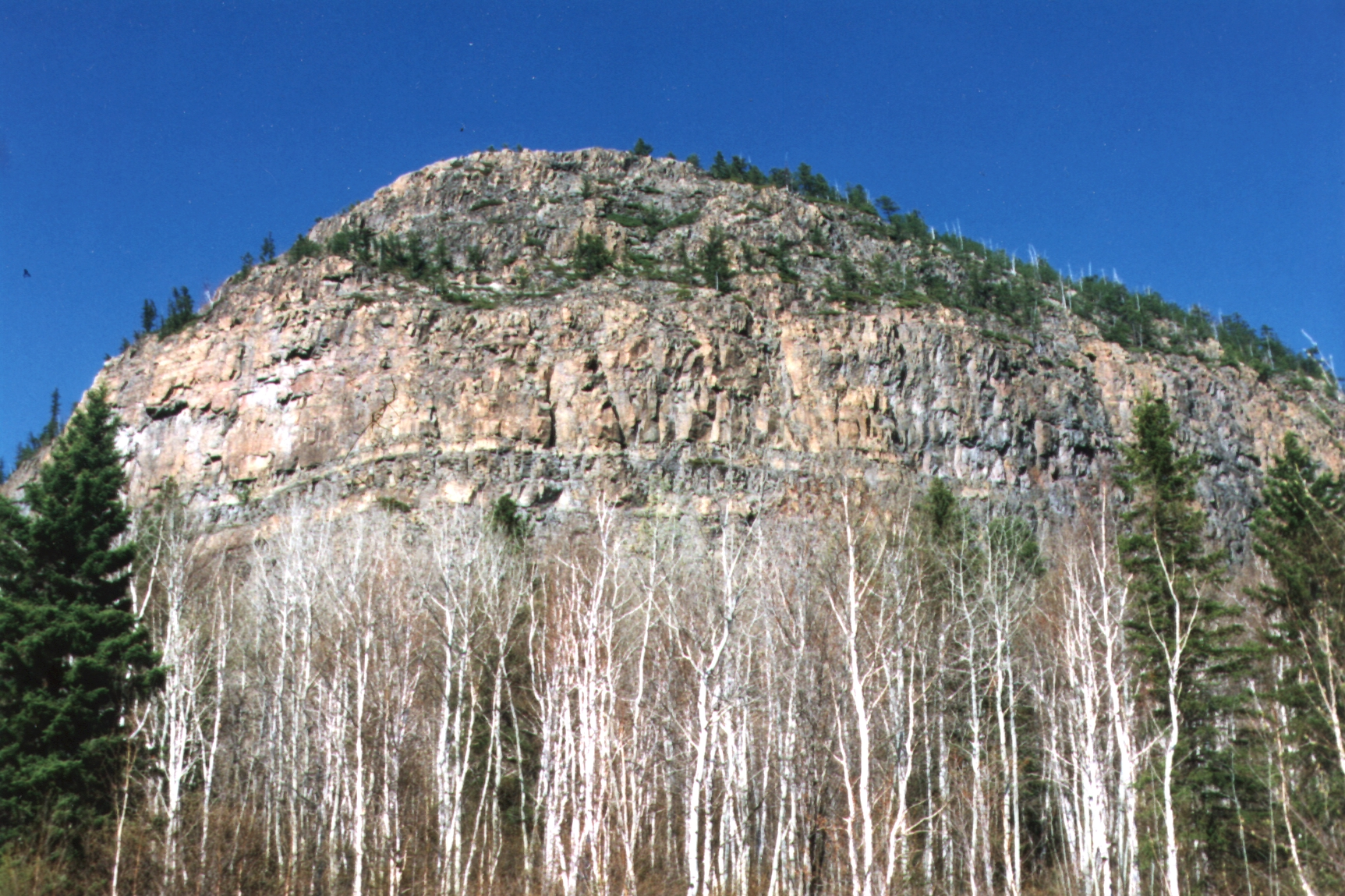
1997 photo of Mount Cheminis

Mount Cheminis is an isolated hill of hard resistant caprock that rises abruptly from the surrounding relatively flat land which has been eroded away. It was created in the most recent ice age. It is situated at the point of V-sharped lines of geological ridges, which are understood to have diverted the retreating ice sheet east and west. The features were formed as part of the same glaciological movements that create the Collines kékéko (English: Kékéko Hills), although the physical appearance between the two features is notably different.

It is one of the highest peaks in the Abitibi-Témiscamingue region.

Mount Cheminis is located in Quebec between Lake Temiskaming and Lake Abitibi close to the border of Ontario. It is close to Kearns, Ontario (also known as McGarry), Kap-Kig-Iwan Provincial Park, and also the Timiskaming District near Ontario Highway 66 and Quebec Route 117.

It was described in 2019 as "one of the most striking landscape features in all of Northern Ontario".

== Significance to Indigenous peoples ==
Mount Cheminis is used by Indigenous peoples of Canada for ceremony. Dr. Jonathan Pitt of Nipissing University's Schulich School of Education Aboriginal Education Programs said in 2021 that "Rock formations like Mount Cheminis are important to Indigenous spirituality."

== Significance in tourism ==
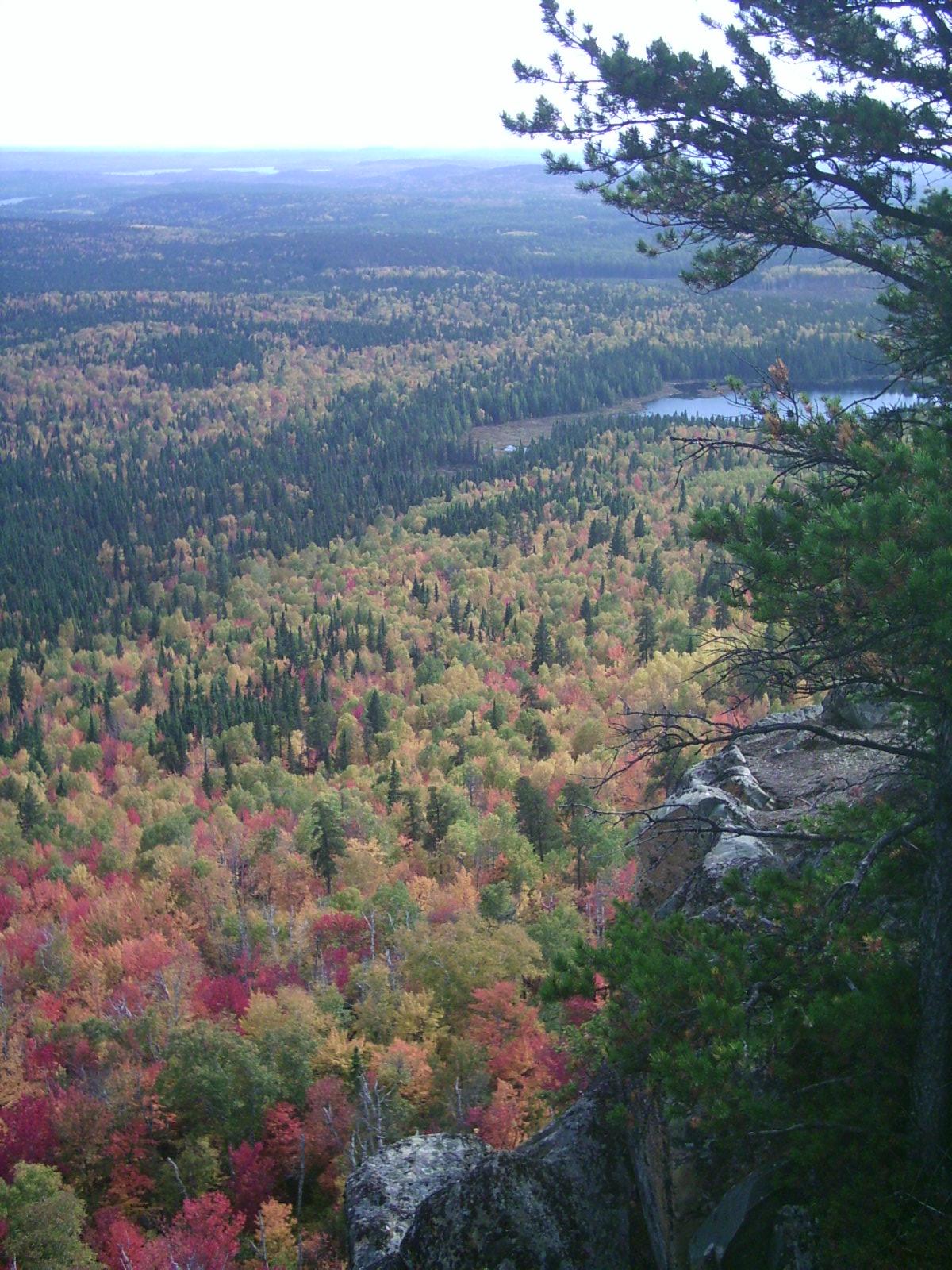
View from Mount Cheminis, 2008

Mount Cheminis provides panoramic views that attract tourists, although a 1984 report from Collège de l'Abitibi-Témiscamingue noted rotting stairs and a lack of maintenance on and around the hill.

== In human history ==
Canadian geologist Robert Bell wrote about Mount Cheminis after he surveyed Lake Temiskaming in 1887.

From 1925 to 1927, Mount Cheminis marked the end of the Temiskaming & Northern Ontario Railway due to the refusal of the Quebec government to allow expansion into their territory.

From 1926 until 1946 it was the location of a post office.

A mutilated human body was found at the top of Mount Cheminis in 1955.

In 2019, 17-year-old hiker Brennan Goulding, died as he fell while climbing Mount Cheminis.
