= Deak Resources =

Defunct Canadian mining company

Deak Resources Corporation
- Industry: Mining
- Predecessor: Wilco Mining Company, Seadrift International Exploration Limited and Deak Ariadne Limited
- Founded: 1989
- Successor: AJ Perron Gold
- Headquarters: Canada

Deak Resources Corporation was a Canadian mining company that was formed by a merger in 1989. It became AJ Perron Gold in 1994 and operated the Kerr-Addison Mine.

AJ Perron Gold became delisted from the Toronto Stock Exchange in 1998.

== History ==
The company operated as a subsidiary of Deak International Resources Inc, formed by the merger of Wilco Mining Company, Seadrift International Exploration Limited and Deak Ariadne Limited in 1989. It was traded on the Toronto Stock Exchange.

In February 1989, the company reached an agreement with MacDonald Mines Exploration to reopen the West MacDonald zinc mine in Dufresnoy, Quebec. In 1990, the company bought the Kerr-Addison Mine for $4.1 million (mostly by assuming existing debt) and used the location to mill ore from various nearby mines. Operations were managed by the company's subsidiary GSR Acquisition Corporation. The company was fined $50,000 by the Ontario Ministry of the Environment in 1992 after it polluted Larder Lake with cyanide and heavy metals. After running into financial challenges, the company closed the mine and terminated the employment of the workers.

In May 1993, brothers John and Alex Perron of Kirkland Lake used their company Gwen Resources to buy a controlling share of the struggling company and appointed Alex Perron as company president. The brothers renamed the company AJ Perron Gold in 1994 and made plans to increase production at the Kerr-Addison Mine.

After owing $2.1 of taxes to the township of McGarry, the company's assets were seized by bailiffs. Threats of litigation by the company against the township were made, but were not followed through. The company was delisted in 1998.
