= Cobalt: Cradle of the Demon Metals, Birth of a Mining Superpower =

2022 non-fiction book by Charlie Angus

- Author: Charlie Angus
- Subjects: Mining history; corporate misbehaviour
- Publisher: House of Anansi Press
- Publication date: February 1, 2022
- Pages: 336
- ISBN: 978-1487009496

Cobalt: Cradle of the Demon Metals, Birth of a Mining Superpower is a 2022 book by Canadian politician Charlie Angus.

The non-fiction publication documents the mining history of Cobalt, Ontario, and tensions between mining corporations and the population.

== Publication ==
Cobalt is written by Canadian politician Charlie Angus. A member of the New Democratic Party, he had served as the Member of Parliament for Timmins—James Bay since 2004. It is published by House of Anansi Press.

== Synopsis ==
Cobalt documents the events in Cobalt, Ontario around the turn of the 20th century, in particular the power and role of mining companies.

The book examines the dominance of the perspectives of White settlers in histories of prospecting rushes, despite the trade in metals by Indigenous peoples for two thousand years prior. It notes the theft of land from Indigenous peoples, the exploitation of workers and the environmental damage that occurred in early-20th-century Ontario, and subsequently on a global scale. The book discusses the federal Government of Canada's complicity in mining companies' abuses of land ownership.

== Critical reception ==
Don Curry's review of the book in Bay Today described the book as "gripping", "hard hitting" and a "page turner". The book was shortlisted for the Legislative Assembly of Ontario's Speaker's Book Prize in 2022.

== See also ==
- Gold mining
- Mining in Canada
- List of gold mines in Canada
