= Larder Lake =

- Township (single-tier)
- Township of Larder Lake
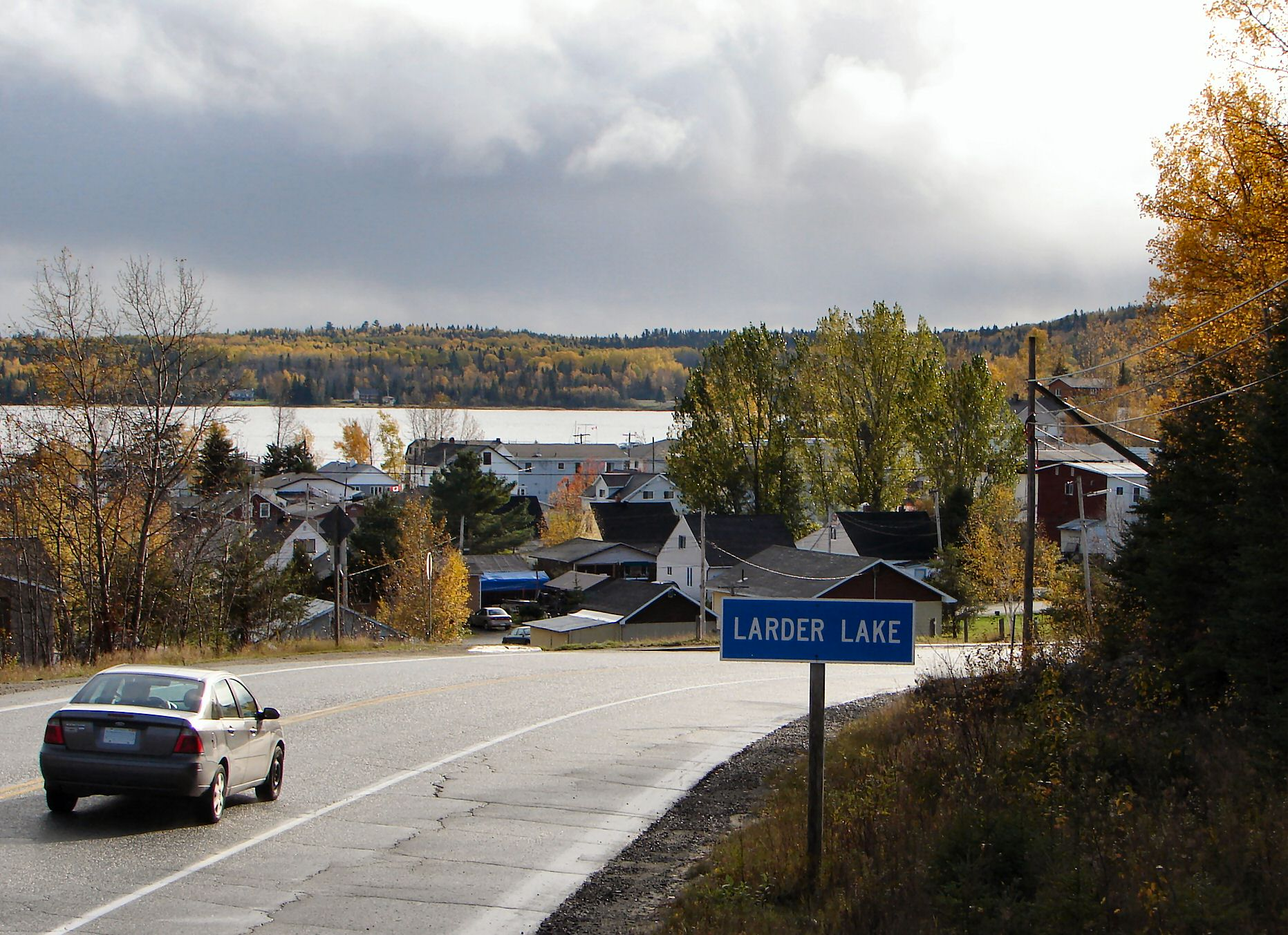

- Location within Ontario
- Coordinates: 48°03′55″N 79°41′55″W
- Country: Canada
- Province: Ontario
- District: Timiskaming
- Established: 1907
- Incorporated: 1938 (town)
- Incorporated: 1945 (township)

Government
  - Type: Township
  - Mayor: Patricia Quinn
  - MP: Gaétan Malette
  - MPP: John Vanthof

Area
  - Land: 227.62 km^{2} (87.88 sq mi)
- Elevation: 299 m (981 ft)

Population (2021)
  - Total: 745
  - Density: 3.3/km^{2} (8.5/sq mi)
- Time zone: UTC-5 (EST)
  - Summer (DST): UTC-4 (EDT)
- Postal code span: P0K
- Area codes: 705, 249
- Website: www.larderlake.ca

Larder Lake is an incorporated municipal township and eponymous constituent dispersed rural community in Timiskaming District in Northeastern Ontario, Canada. It is located along Highway 66 and Highway 624 at the north-western part of the lake bearing the same name. The area of the township is 227.62 km^{2} (87.88 sq mi) and includes the geographic townships of Hearst, McVittie, and Skead.

Located within the "Larder Lake-Cadillac Fault Zone", a geologic region rich in precious metals, the town was the site of the first gold rush in northeastern Ontario.

== History ==
Gold in the area was originally reported in the late 1800’s by Chief Ignace Tonené of the Temagami First Nation. He staked a claim near the north arm of Larder Lake but claimed it was stolen. He reported it, but Indian Affairs was unable to help. Chief Tonenè Lake was named in his honour.

The discovery of silver in Cobalt, Ontario in 1903 led prospectors to search across northern Ontario for new finds. The discovery of gold led to 4,000 claims by the winter of 1906 and the eventual development of the Omega (1936-1947), Chesterville gold mine (1938-1952), and Kerr Addison gold mines (started in 1936).

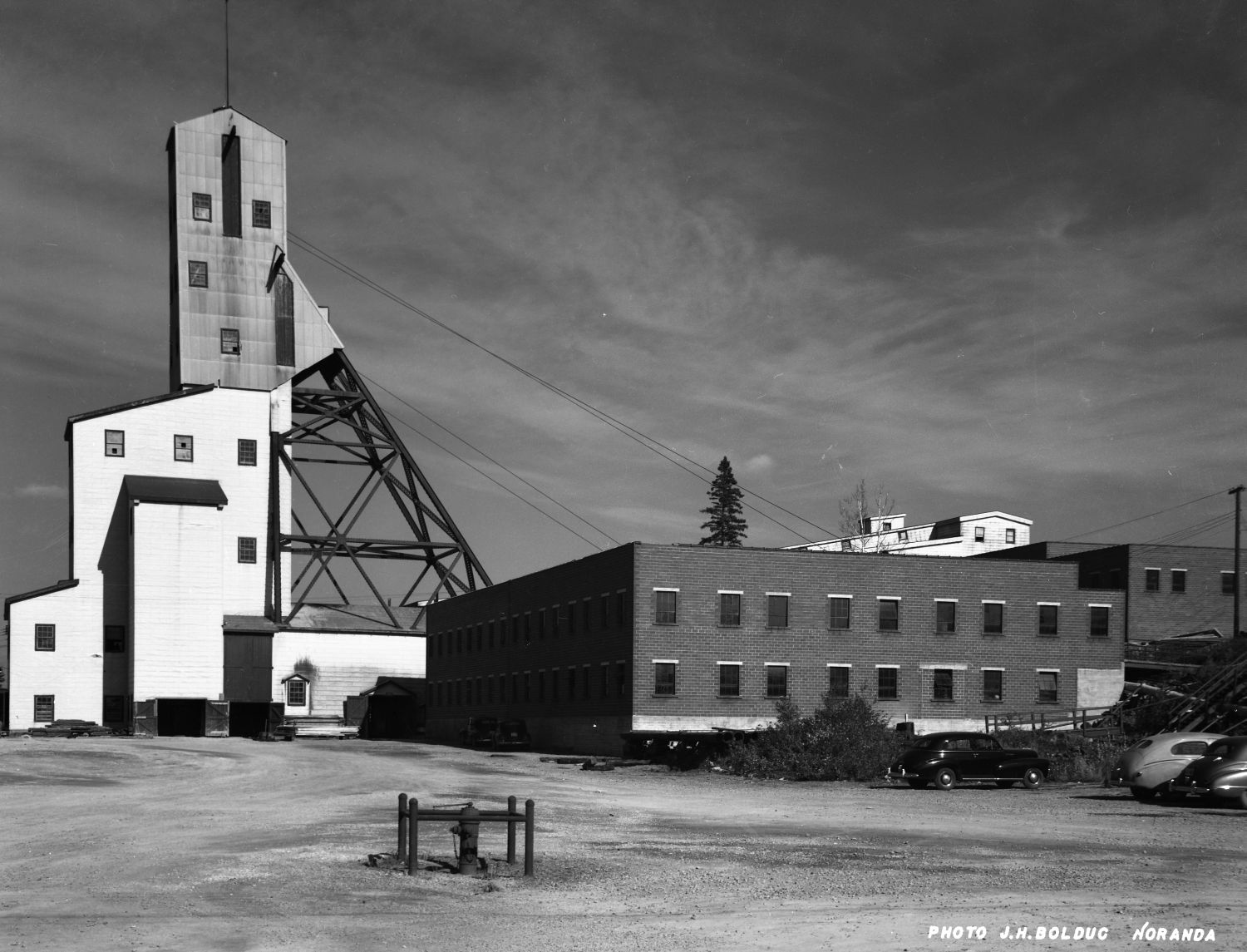
Kerr-Addison gold mine, 1947

H.L. Kerr explored the Larder Lake area in 1904, but did not find gold. He returned with his partner Bill Addison in 1906, and discovered traces of gold near the north arm of Larder Lake, next to Robert Reddick's claims. Within months, 40 gold mining companies were established, and there was tremendous optimism and financial speculation. A mining investment company published an advertisement in the Ottawa Citizen in 1907 stating: "The Larder Lake district is believed to be the richest gold country ever known, and it is just now being opened up. Soon will commence the most tremendous outpouring of gold known to civilization." Three-thousand men made their way to the area via canoe and portage to look for work, settling in a camp known as "Larder City". Excitement led to disappointment, as no large deposits of gold were found, and most of the town was abandoned by 1911. The Kerr-Addison Gold Mine, between 1907 and 1911, was able to produce just $314 worth of gold, though that small output was used to mint Canada's first $5 gold pieces.

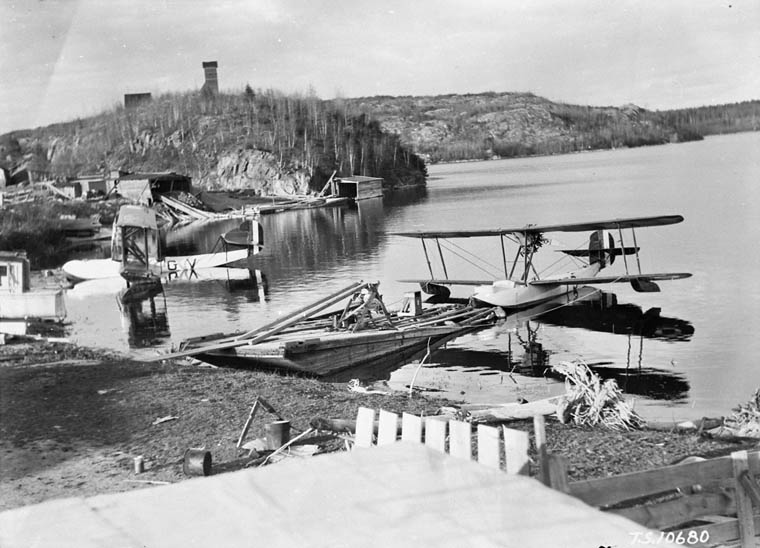
Royal Canadian Air Force planes at Larder Lake, 1926

In 1936, a large gold deposit was discovered in Larder Lake, leading to the establishment of several productive mines. In total 13 million ounces of gold were produced in the area.

Ontario Highway 66 was built in the 1930s to connect the various mining towns in the region. The highway connected Larder Lake to Kirkland Lake in the west, and to other mining communities to the east. The section between Kirkland Lake and Larder Lake was paved in 1944.

In 1937, a boat traveling across Larder Lake to Miller Island on a fishing expedition capsized, killing all 7 on board. Searchers discovered the boat filled with water, and slowly began to recover bodies. The boat's captain, John C. Skinner, Chief Engineer of the Lake Shore Mining Company, had been warned by a forest ranger that the weather conditions were too dangerous for the journey.

In 1938, the Town of Larder Lake was incorporated from previously unorganized area. The Lakeshore Hotel was destroyed by fire that same year. Guests lost all their belongings, though no injuries were reported.

By 1941, labourers at Larder Lake's Omega Gold Mine were earning $4.64 per day, and the mine captain was earning $8.70 per day. Omega was awarded the John T. Ryan Trophy in 1943 by the Canadian Institute of Mining, Metallurgy and Petroleum for having the lowest accident frequency in Canada during the previous year.

In 1945, the town was dissolved and absorbed in the newly-formed township municipality of Larder Lake.

The Catholic church in Larder Lake caught fire in 1947, just moments after Sunday mass. No injuries were reported, though all sacred vessels, organ drapes, vestments and pews were destroyed.

In 1952, the Larder Lake Fire Department took first place in a regional competition of the Timiskaming Firemen's Association, beating 22 other fire brigades.

Larder Lake's train station, located north-east of the town, was the site of a large robbery in 1965. Five gold bars worth $165,000 were awaiting shipment to the mint in Ottawa, when 4 armed men broke in. A float plane in Larder Lake was believed used in the getaway.

A damaging storm moved through northeastern Ontario on July 17, 2006, bringing with it winds of 120 km/h (75 mph) to 150 km/h (93 mph). Approximately 1,904 ha (4,700 acres) of forest southwest of Larder Lake suffered blowdown.

The 2010 Winter Olympics torch relay passed through Larder Lake on January 1, 2010.

== Demographics ==
In the 2021 Census of Population conducted by Statistics Canada, Larder Lake had a population of 745 living in 352 of its 440 total private dwellings, a change of 2.1% from its 2016 population of 730. With a land area of 227.62 km^{2} (87.88 sq mi), it had a population density of 3.3/km^{2} (8.5/sq mi) in 2021.

Canada census – Larder Lake community profile

| | 2021 | 2016 | 2011 |
| Population | 745 (+2.1% from 2016) | 730 (6.7% from 2011) | 684 (-6.9% from 2006) |
| Land area | 227.62 km^{2} (87.88 sq mi) | 229.52 km^{2} (88.62 sq mi) | 229.65 km^{2} (88.67 sq mi) |
| Population density | 3.3/km^{2} (8.5/sq mi) | 3.2/km^{2} (8.3/sq mi) | 3.0/km^{2} (7.8/sq mi) |
| Median age | 51.2 (M: 52.0, F: 50.4) | 50.9 (M: 50.8, F: 51.0) | 52.4 (M: 53.7, F: 50.8) |
| Private dwellings | 440 (total) 352 (occupied) | 466 (total) | 519 (total) |
| Median household income | $73,500 | $60,459 |

References: 2021 2016 2011

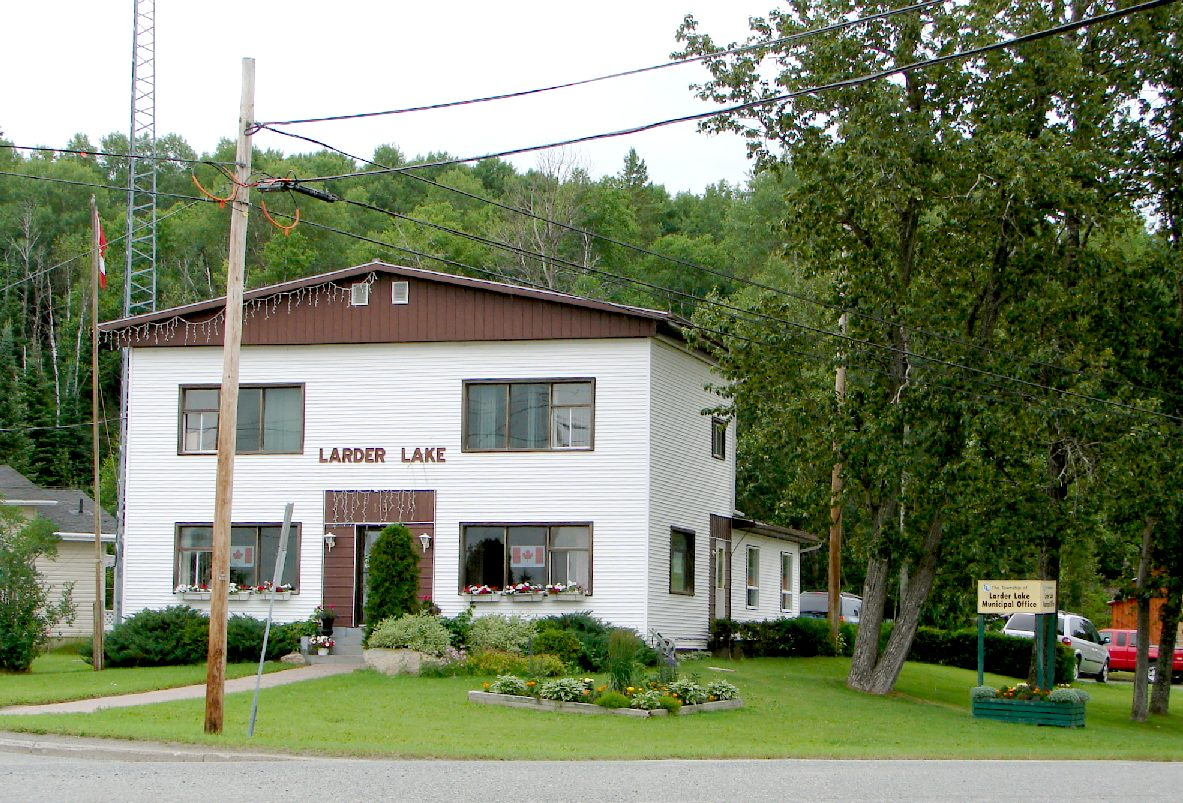
Larder Lake municipal building

Historical census populations – Larder Lake

| Year | Pop. | ±% |
|---|---|---|
| 1941 | 1,464 | — |
| 1951 | 2,129 | +45.4% |
| 1956 | 2,080 | −2.3% |
| 1961 | 2,187 | +5.1% |
| 1966 | 1,582 | −27.7% |
| 1971 | 1,475 | −6.8% |
| 1976 | 1,281 | −13.2% |
| 1981 | 1,113 | −13.1% |

| Year | Pop. | ±% |
|---|---|---|
| 1986 | 1,091 | −2.0% |
| 1991 | 1,030 | −5.6% |
| 1996 | 982 | −4.7% |
| 2001 | 790 | −19.6% |
| 2006 | 735 | −7.0% |
| 2011 | 684 | −6.9% |
| 2016 | 730 | +6.7% |
| 2021 | 745 | +2.1% |

1941 Population figure is for Larder Lake Town.
Source: Statistics Canada

Mother tongue (2021):

- English as first language: 75.2%
- French as first language: 18.8%
- English and French as first languages: 3.4%
- Other as first language: 2.0%

== See also ==
- Larder Lake (Ontario)
- Dobie, Ontario - community to the west of Larder Lake
- Virginiatown, Ontario - community to the east of Larder Lake
- List of townships in Ontario
- List of francophone communities in Ontario
