= Blanche River (Lake Timiskaming) =

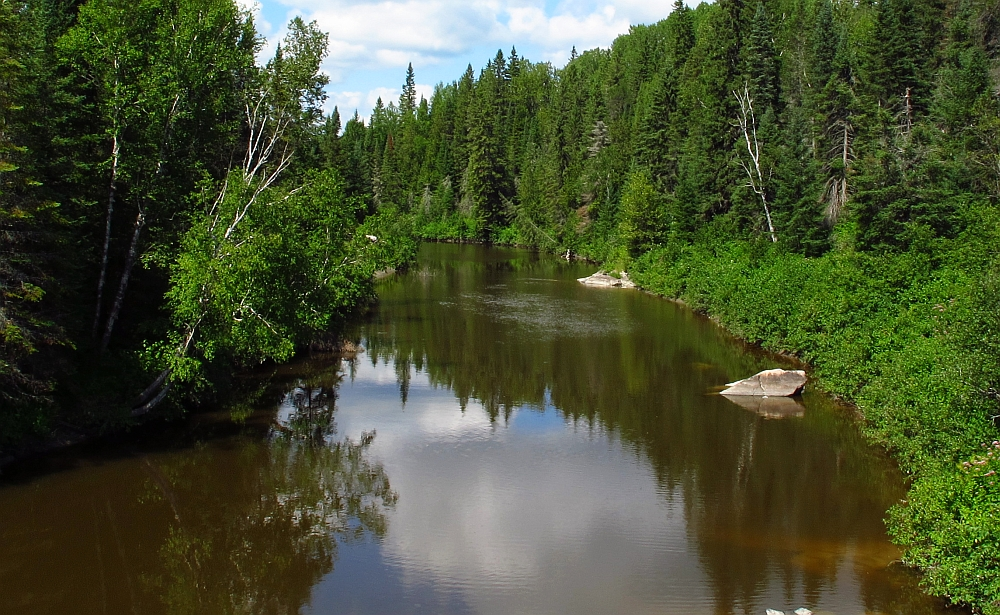
- Blanche River, looking north from Pacaud Chamberlain Boundary Road in Krugerdorf, Ontario

- Location of the mouth of the Blanche River in Ontario
- Etymology: from the French for "white"

Location
- Country: Canada
- Province: Ontario
- Region: Northeastern Ontario
- District: Timiskaming

Physical characteristics
- Source: Sesekinika Lake
  - location: Maisonville Township
  - coordinates: 48°12′22″N 80°15′32″W
  - elevation: 306 m (1,004 ft)
- Mouth: Lake Timiskaming
  - location: Harris, Cochrane District, Ontario, Canada
  - coordinates: 47°34′09″N 79°31′56″W
  - elevation: 178.4 m (585 ft)

Basin features
- River system: Saint Lawrence River drainage basin
- Tributaries
  - left: Larder River, Misema River
  - right: Englehart River

The Blanche River is a river in the Saint Lawrence River drainage basin in Timiskaming District in northeastern Ontario, Canada. The river is a tributary of Lake Timiskaming and its name is from the French for the colour "white".

== Course ==
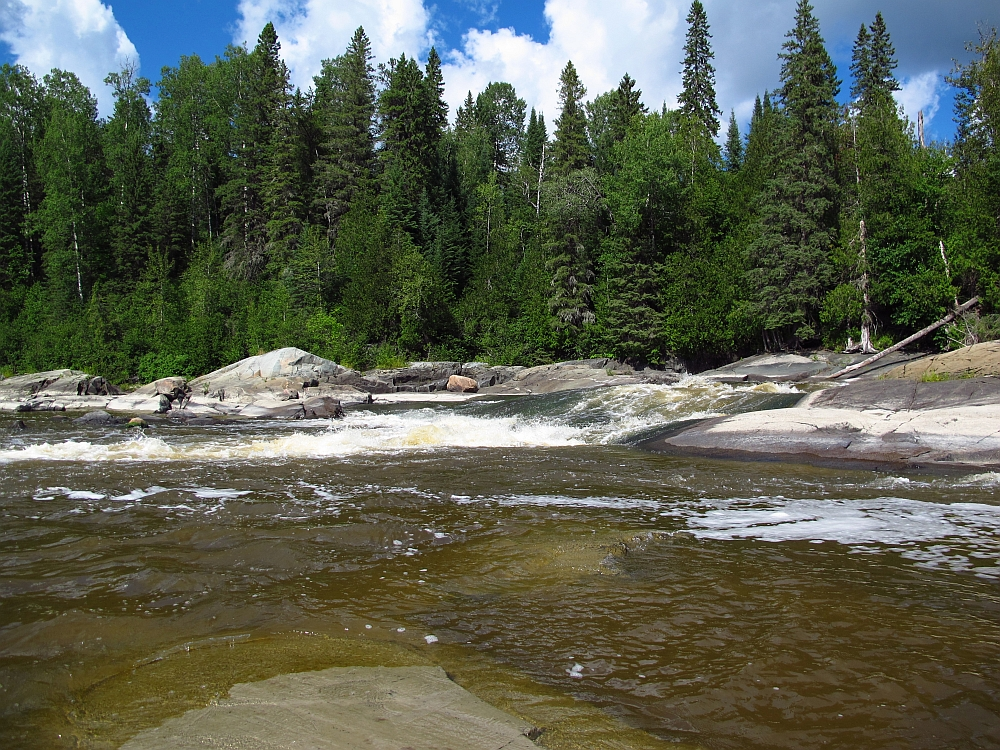
Stuart's Rapids on the Blanche River

The river begins as Sesekinika Lake in geographic Maisonville Township and flow west under Ontario Highway 11, turns south, heads through Kenogami Lake, then back under Ontario Highway 11 at the settlement of Kenogami Lake, flows under the Ontario Northland Railway (ONR) mainline and past Kenogami Lake Station, enters the municipality of Kirkland Lake and reaches the community of Swastika. It passes under Ontario Highway 66 and back under the ONR mainline, past the community of Tarzwell on Round Lake, under Ontario Highway 112, into the township of Chamberlain, once again under the ONR mainline, over the Eighty Foot Falls and Stuart's Rapids, takes in the left tributary Misema River and takes in the right tributary of Englehart River in geographic Marter Township, just north of the town of Englehart. The river heads under Ontario Highway 624, takes in the left tributary Larder River, passes into the municipality of Evanturel and then the geographic Ingram Township, flows under Ontario Highway 569 at the community of Tomstown and reaches the township of Hilliard where it passes once again under Ontario Highway 569. It heads briefly through the township of Brethour, then into the township of Casey, flows under Ontario Highway 65 at the community of Judge, and reaches its mouth at Baie Paulson (Paulson Bay) at the north end of Lake Timiskaming on the Ottawa River, east of the settlement of Sutton Bay in the township of Harris and just west of the border with the province of Quebec. The Ottawa River flows to the Saint Lawrence River at Montreal.

== Tributaries ==
- Wright Creek (left)
- Pontleroy Creek (left)
- Taylor Creek (left)
- Larder River (left)
- Englehart River (right)
- Moosehorn Creek (left)
- Misema River (left)
- Boston Creek (left)
- Aidie Creek (right)
- Smith Creek (left)
- Crooked Creek (right)
- Murdock Creek (left)
- Amikougami Creek (left)
- Perron Creek (left)
- Lillord Creek (right)

== See also ==
- List of rivers of Ontario
