= List of Zeta Psi members =

Zeta Psi is a social college fraternity in North America. It was established in 1847. The fraternity has over 100 chapters, encompassing roughly 50,000 brothers. Fraternity members have distinguished themselves in a wide range of professional fields, including government service, the military, literature, and the entertainment industry. The following is an incomplete list of notable members.

== Academics ==
Name	Original chapter	Notability	Ref.
John Bardeen	Lambda Psi 1928	Two-Time Nobel Laureate in Physics; co-inventor of the transistor; professor of electrical engineering of physics at the University of Illinois	
Conrad Harrington	Αlpha Psi 1933 and 1936	Chancellor of McGill University	
Arden Haynes	Pi Epsilon 1951	Chancellor of York University; chair and CEO of Imperial Oil	
E. Coppée Mitchell	1855	Chair of law of real estate, conveyancing and equity jurisprudence and dean of University of Pennsylvania Law School	
William Pepper	Sigma 1862 and 1864	Provost of the University of Pennsylvania	
Julius Adams Stratton	Phi Lambda 1923	President of Massachusetts Institute of Technology	
Henry Suzzallo	Phi Lambda 1920	President of the University of Washington	

== Business ==
Name	Original chapter	Notability	Ref.
Jim Balsillie	Theta Xi 1984	Chairman and co-CEO Research in Motion	
James Richard Cantalupo	Alpha Epsilon 1966	Chairman and chief executive officer of McDonald's Corporation	
Mark Fields	Delta	COO, Ford Motor Company	
Henry Ford II	Eta	CEO and chairman, Ford Motor Company	
William B. Harrison Jr.	Eta	CEO and chairman of JPMorgan Chase	
Arden Haynes	Pi Epsilon 1951	CEO and chair of Imperial Oil Limited, chancellor of York University	
Lawrence Heisey	Theta Xi 1948	President and chairman of Harlequin Enterprises	
Roderick M. Hills	Μu	Chairman, Securities and Exchange Commission	
Eric Molson	Alpha Psi	Chairman, Molson Beer Companies, received Order of Canada	
Brian L. Roberts	Sigma 1981	Chairman and CEO of Comcast Corporation	
Julian Robertson	Upsilon	Chairman of the Tiger Fund (Tiger Management Corp.)	
John Templeton	Eta 1934	Founder of the Templeton Growth Fund, philanthropist, namesake of Templeton College, Oxford	
Dean G. Witter	Iota 1909	Founder, Dean Witter & Company	

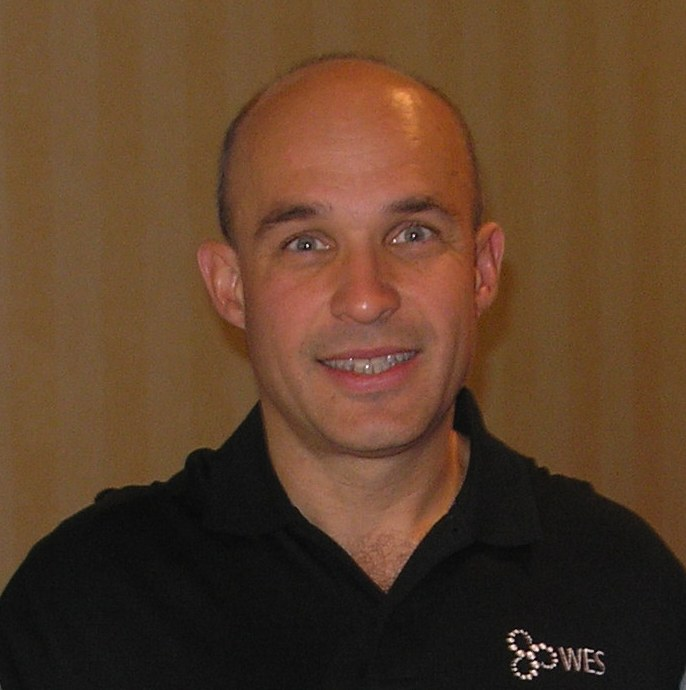
Jim Balsillie

== Crime ==
Name / Original chapter / Notability / Ref.; John du Pont / Sigma / Convicted murderer of Dave Schultz

== Entertainment ==
Name	Original chapter	Notability	Ref.
Dean Cain	Omicron Epsilon 1988	Actor	
Lauv	Phi 2016	Music artist	
Dizzy Reed	Psi, honorary	Musician, keyboardist for Guns N' Roses	
Michael Smerconish	1984	American radio host and television presenter	
Brian Sullivan	Αlpha Pi 1993	Anchor; Bloomberg Television, Morning Call; Fox Business Network	
Dick Wolf	Sigma 1969	Emmy Award-winning producer and creator of Law & Order	
Jared Miller	Psi 2028	YouTuber, writer, and sketch comedian	

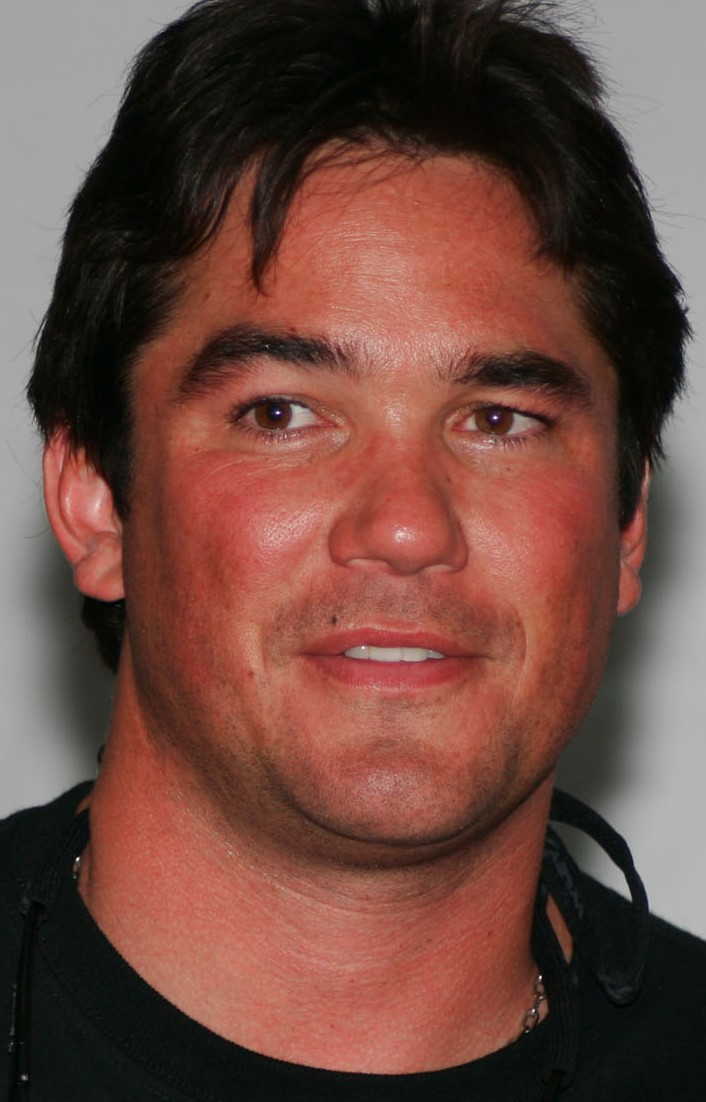
Dean Cain

== Law ==
Name	Original chapter	Notability	Ref.
James Biggs	Upsilon 1893	United States Solicitor General	
Brian Dickson	Pi Epsilon	Chief Justice of the Supreme Court of Canada, law professor	
Arthur Gajarsa	Pi 1962	United States Court of Appeals for the Federal Circuit	
Andrew Kirkpatrick	Delta 1863	Judge of the United States District Court for the District of New Jersey	
Roy McMurtry	Theta Xi 1954	Chief Justice Court of Appeal for Ontario, Canadian High Commissioner to the United Kingdom, Attorney General of Ontario, chancellor of York University	
John G. Sargent	Κappa 1887 and 1912	United States Attorney General	
Augustus Van Wyck	Upsilon 1864	New York Supreme Court justice	
Allan Wachowich	Μu Theta 1957	Chief Justice Court of Queen's Bench of Alberta	

== Literature and journalism ==
Name	Original chapter	Notability	Ref.
Steve Berman	Beta Tau 1990	Award-winning editor and author of gay speculative fiction.	
Stephen Butler Leacock	Theta Xi 1891	Writer and economist, namesake of the Stephen Leacock Award for Canadian literary humour	
John McCrae	Theta Xi 1894	Author of In Flanders Fields	
Arthur Harrison Motley	Alpha Beta	publisher, Parade	
Benjamin Spock	Αlpha 1929	Author of The Common Sense Book of Baby and Child Care; Olympic gold medalist in rowing (1924). See Athletics section for a photo.	

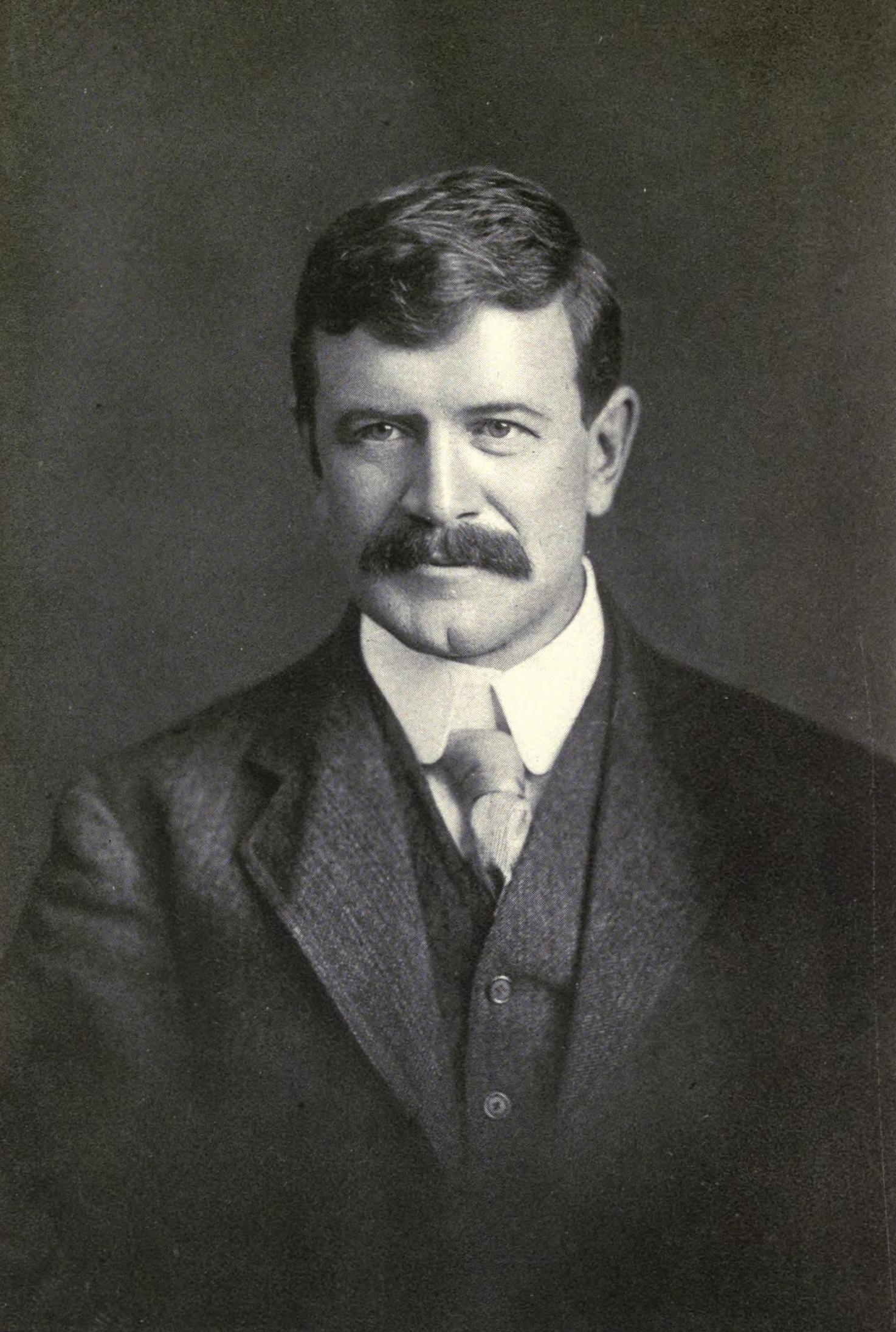
Stephen Leacock

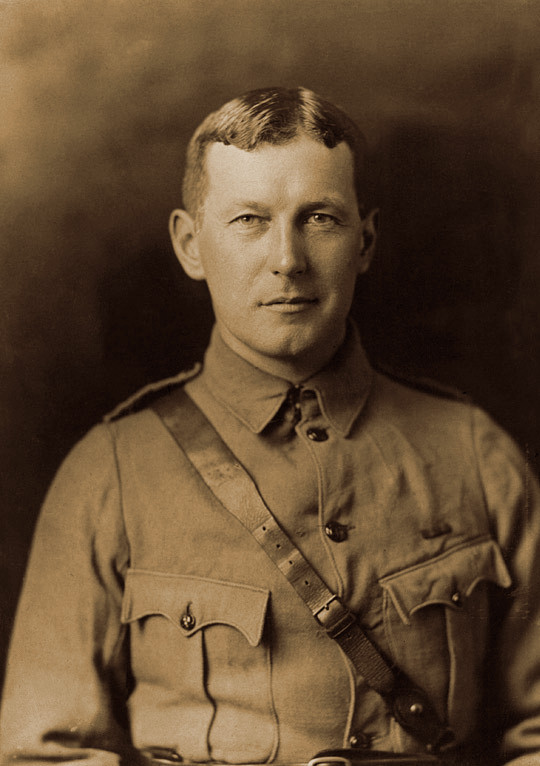
John McCrae

== Military ==
Name	Original chapter	Notability	Ref.
James J. Carey	Omega 1960	Rear Admiral of the United States Navy, chairman of the Federal Maritime Commission	
Jeff Cooper	Omega 1941	Lieutenant Colonel, USMC, creator of the modern technique of handgun shooting	
Frederick Fisher (VC)	Alpha Psi 1913	Recipient of the Victoria Cross	
James Parker	Delta	Major General; U.S. Army, Medal of Honor recipient (Philippine–American War)	
Thomas O. Seaver	Κappa 1855	Colonel in the United States Army during the American Civil War, Medal of Honor recipient	

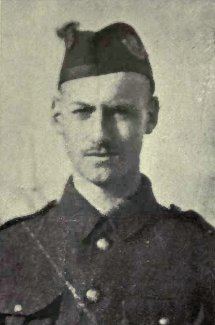
Frederick Fisher

== Politics ==
=== Governors ===
Name	Original chapter	Notability	Ref.
James Budd	Ιota 1873	Governor of California, United States House of Representatives	
William T. Cobb	Lambda 1877	Governor of Maine	
William Comstock	Xi 1899	Governor of Michigan	
Seldon Connor	Κappa 1859	Governor of Maine	
Gray Davis	Μu 1964	Governor of California	
Howard Dean	Eta 1971	Governor of Vermont and chairman of Democratic National Committee	
Nelson Dingley Jr.	Pis 1855	Governor of Maine and United States House of Representatives	
Elisha Dyer Jr.	Εpsilon 1859	Governor of Rhode Island	
Edward I. Edwards	Phi	Governor of New Jersey, United States Senator from New Jersey	
George D. Robinson	Rho 1856	Governor of Massachusetts and United States House of Representatives	
Pete Wilson	Eta 1955	Governor of California, United States Senator, and Mayor of San Diego	

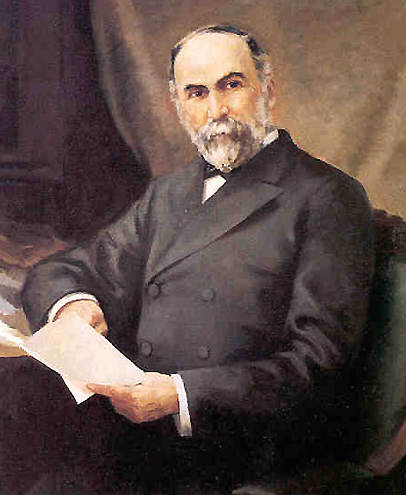
Nelson Dingley Jr.

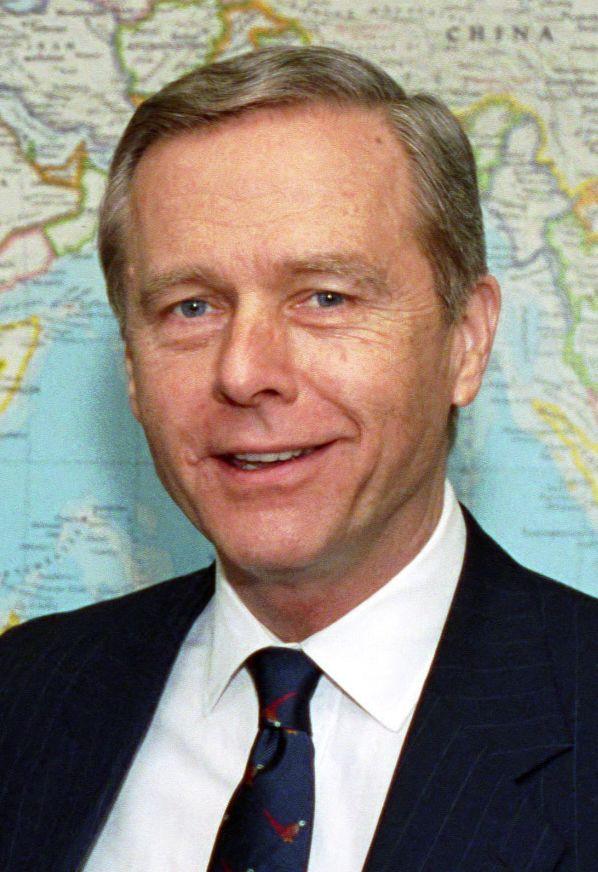
Pete Wilson

=== Federal senators ===
Name	Original chapter	Notability	Ref.
William Benton	Eta 1918	United States Senate from Connecticut, chairman of Encyclopædia Britannica	
Scott Brown	Kappa 1981	United States Senate from Massachusetts	
Prescott Bush	Eta 1917	United States Senate from Connecticut, father of President George H. W. Bush and grandfather of President George W. Bush	
Gilbert Hitchcock	Xi 1881	United States Senate from Nebraska and member of United States House of Representatives	
William F. Knowland	Ιota 1929	United States Senate from California	
Alex Padilla	Rho Alpha 1994	United States Senate from California	
George Wharton Pepper	Sigma 1887	United States Senate Pennsylvania, attorney, law professor, and founder of Pepper Hamilton LLP	

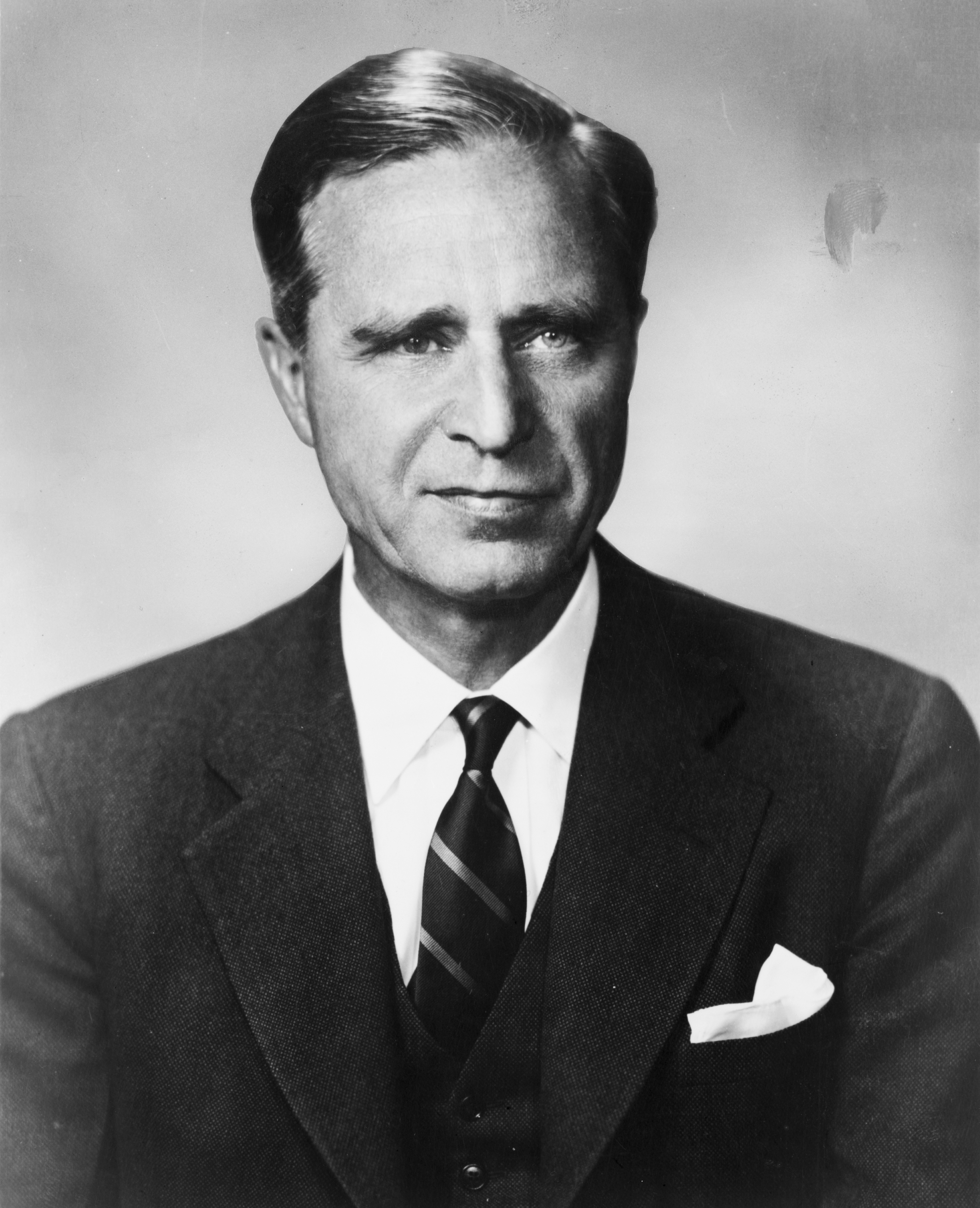
Prescott Bush

=== Federal representatives ===
Name	Original chapter	Notability	Ref.
Edmund James Bristol	Theta Xi 1983	Parliament of Canada	
John Dahmer	Μu Theta 1961	Member of Parliament (Canada)	
Bertrand W. Gearhart	Ιota 1910	United States House of Representatives	
Angier Goodwin	Chi 1902	United States House of Representatives	
John Edward Nelson	Chi 1898	United States House of Representatives	
Charles E. Phelps	Omicron Epsilon 1865	United States House of Representatives, judge of the Circuit Court of Baltimore, Brigadier General in the United States Army	
Charles A. Sumner	Zeta 1854	United States House of Representatives, Nevada Senate	

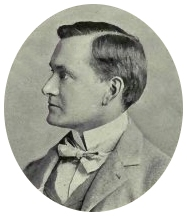
Edmund James Bristol

=== Federal cabinet and diplomacy ===
Name	Original chapter	Notability	Ref.
Les Aspin	Eta 1960	United States Secretary of Defense, United States House of Representatives	
Richard A. Ballinger	Ζeta 1884	United States Secretary of the Interior, Mayor of Seattle	
Erskine Bowles	Upsilon	White House Chief of Staff, president of the University of North Carolina system, Administrator of the Small Business Administration, and co-chair of the National Commission on Fiscal Responsibility and Reform	
Brett McGurk	Eta 1996	United States National Security Council coordinator for the Middle East and North Africa, Special Presidential Envoy for the Global Coalition to Counter the Islamic State of Iraq and the Levant	

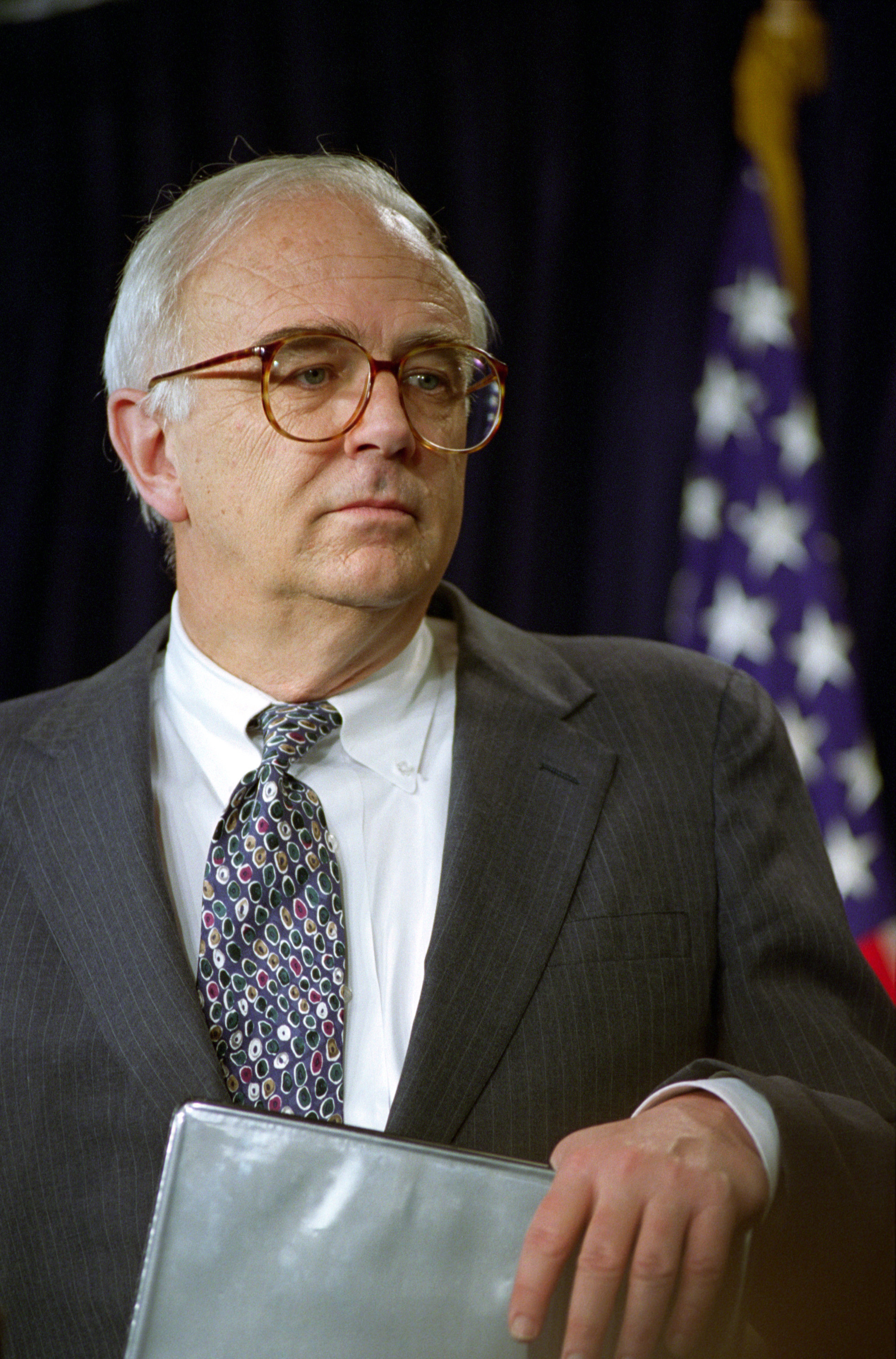
Les Aspin

=== State and local ===
Name	Original chapter	Notability	Ref.
George Bradley	Chi 1853	Speaker of the Minnesota House of Representatives	
William B. Harrison	Βeta 1910	Mayor of Louisville, Kentucky	

== Science and medicine ==
Name	Original chapter	Notability	Ref.
John V. N. Dorr	Delta 1894	industrial chemist and inventor	
Alfred Kinsey	Lambda 1916	Biologist and sex researcher; founder of The Kinsey Institute	

== Sports ==
=== Baseball ===
Name	Original chapter	Notability	Ref.
Bob Boone	Μu 1969	Professional baseball player and manager, four-time All-Star	
William C. Buck	Τau 1950	Part owner of the Philadelphia Phillies	
Joe Maddon	Τau	Major League Baseball manager with the Los Angeles Angels, Tampa Bay Rays, and Chicago Cubs; Manager of the Year in 2008, 2011, and 2015	
Bruce Robinson	Μu 1976	Professional baseball player with the Oakland A's and New York Yankees; National Baseball Hall of Fame	
William Shea	Phi	Owner of the New York Mets, namesake of Shea Stadium	

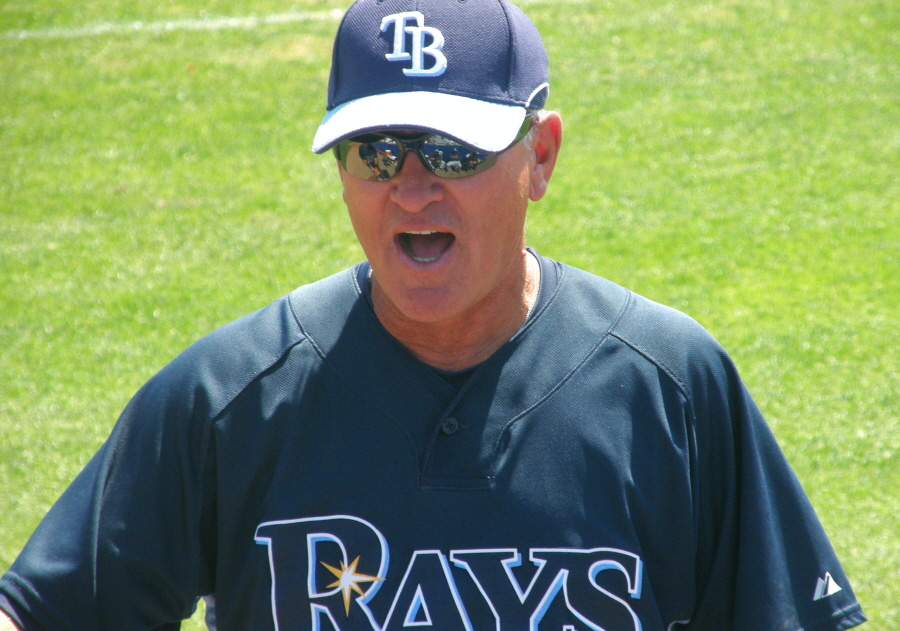
Joe Maddon

=== Football (American) ===
Name	Original chapter	Notability	Ref.
John Brodie	Μu 1956	Professional football player with the San Francisco 49ers; Senior PGA Tour professional golfer; television sports broadcaster	
Ken Dilger	Αlpha Epsilon 1995	Professional football player with the Indianapolis Colts	
Tom Fears	Sigma Zeta	Professional football player with the Los Angeles Rams	
Harold "Red" Grange	Alpha Epsilon 1925	Halfback, Chicago Bears; Named the greatest college football player of all time by ESPN	
Bert LaBrucherie	Sigma Zeta 1929	UCLA and Caltech football coach	

=== Olympians ===
Name	Original chapter	Notability	Ref.
Boyce Budd		Gold Medalist 1964 Rowing	
John Collier		Bronze Medalist in hurdles 1928 Summer Olympics	
Caldwell Esselstyn		Gold Medalist 1956 Rowing	
James Fitzpatrick		Rugby Gold Medalist in the 1956 Summer Olympics	
Edward Graff	1904	Rugby, gold medalist in the 1924 Summer Olympics	
Charles L. Grimes	Eta 1957	Olympic Gold Medalist in rowing - 1956	
Winslow Hall		Gold Medalist 1932 Rowing	
George Hodgson	Alpha Psi 1916	Olympic Gold Medalist in 400 meters and 1500 meters freestyle swimming	
Carl Knowles		Gold Medalist 1936 Basketball	
Henri LaBorde		Silver Medalist 1932 Discus	
Richmond Landon		Gold Medalist 1920 High Jump	
Benjamin Spock	Αlpha 1929	Best-selling author of The Common Sense Book of Baby and Child Care; Olympic gold-medalist in rowing (1924)	
David Wight		Gold Medalist 1956 Rowing	
Pete Zaremba		Bronze medalist for the Hammer toss in the 1932 Summer Olympics	

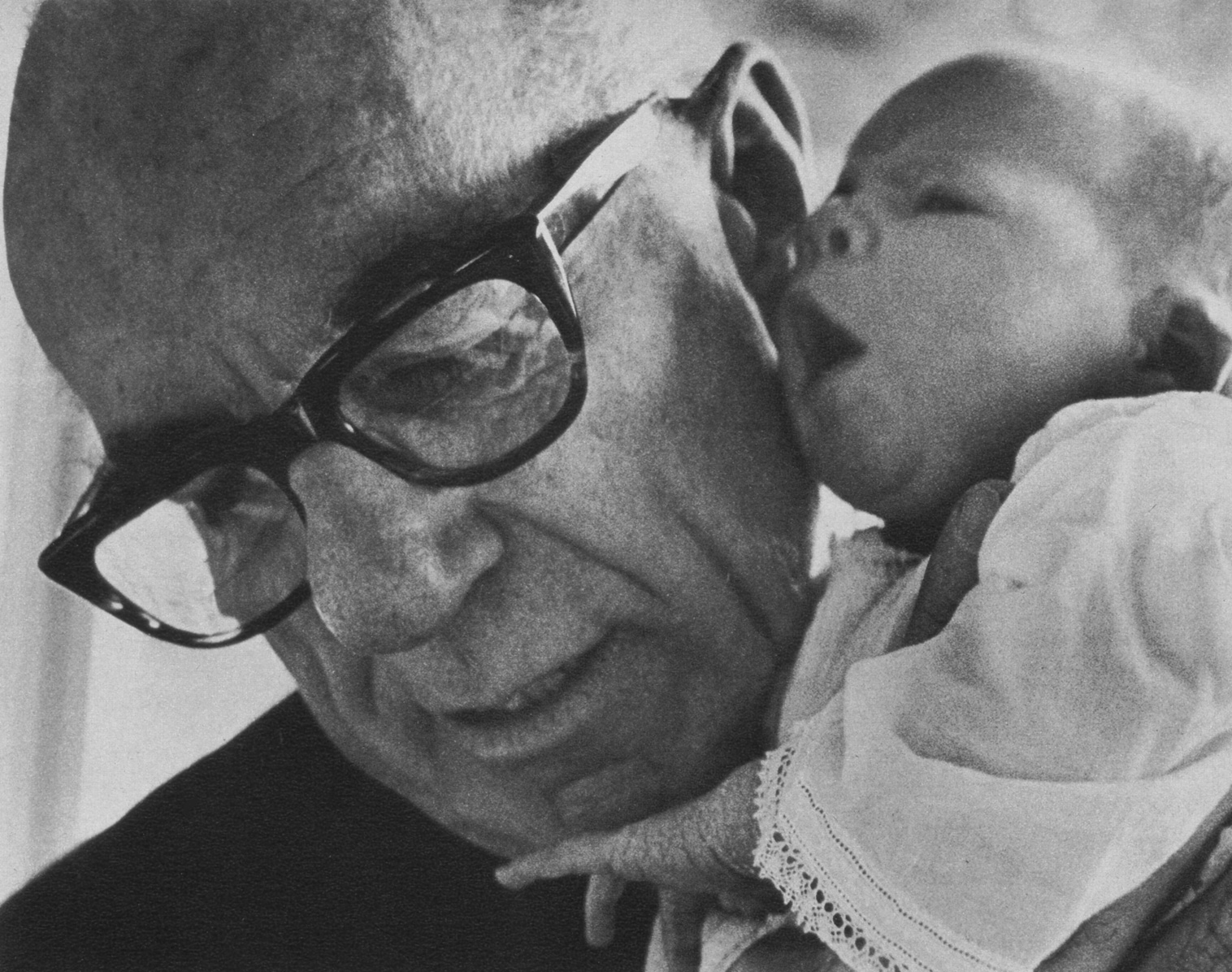
Benjamin Spock

=== Tennis ===
Name	Original chapter	Notability	Ref.
Pat DuPré	Μ 1976	Professional tennis player who won one singles title and four doubles titles, U.S. boys singles and doubles champion	
Sandy Mayer	Μ 1974	Professional tennis player, won 10 singles titles and 24 doubles titles	
Roscoe Tanner	Μ 1973	professional tennis player, won 16 singles titles and one Grand Slam singles	

=
