= Middleton Creek =

Middleton Creek may refer to:

== Australia ==
- Middleton Creek (Queensland)
- Middleton Creek (Victoria)

== Canada ==
- Middleton Creek (Ontario)

== United States ==
- Middleton Creek (California)
- Middleton Creek (Kentucky), crossed by highway KY 2920
- Middleton Creek (Tennessee)
