= Long Lake (Englehart River) =

Lake in Timiskaming District, Ontario, Canada

- Location within Ontario
- Location: Northeastern Ontario, Canada
- Coordinates: 47°55′10″N 80°15′24″W
- Primary inflows: Englehart River, Driftwood Creek, Tamarac Creek
- Primary outflows: Englehart River
- Basin countries: Canada
- Surface elevation: ~250 m (820 ft)
- Islands: 1 (Ryan Island)

Long Lake is a lake formed by the widening of the Englehart River in Timiskaming District of northeastern Ontario, Canada. It consists of several segments and was previously known as Kushog, Kindogami and Robillard Lakes.

The lake is a long, narrow lake, about 24 kilometres (15 mi) long, that runs generally in a straight line from the northwest to the southeast. It follows the Cross Lake Fault escarpment that forms the southwest boundary of the Lake Timiskaming Rift Valley.

The small community of Zeta can be found on the northeast bank of the lake in Robillard Township. Mount MacDonald and Glenvale are also nearby communities. The closest town is Charlton which is located further down the Englehart River. The lake spans five geographic townships, beginning in the southeast corner of Gross Township, then cutting the southwest corner of Blain Township before diagonally bifurcating Sharpe Township into two nearly equal parts. It then cuts through the northeast corner of Truax Township before entering Robillard Township where it narrows.

The fish species found in this lake include brown bullhead, lake herring, lake trout, ling, pike, smallmouth bass, yellow perch, walleye, and white sucker.

The Englehart River Fine Sand Plain and Waterway Provincial Park borders the northwestern third of the lake.
