= William Twaits =

William Twaits may refer to:

- William Twaits (businessman) (1910–1985), Canadian businessman
- William Twaits (actor) (1781–1814), British singer, dancer and actor-manager
- William Twaits (soccer) (1879–1941), Canadian amateur soccer player
