= Marter =

Marter may refer to:

== Places ==
- Marter, Ontario, an unincorporated community in Timiskaming District, Ontario, Canada
- Marter Township, Ontario, an unincorporated geographic township in Timiskaming District

== People with the surname ==
- Ian Marter, actor
- George Frederick Marter, politician

== See also ==
- Martyr
