= Terry Township =

Terry Township may refer to:

Canada

- Terry Township, Ontario

United States

- Terry Township, Finney County, Kansas
- Terry Township, Pennsylvania
