= Ioco, Port Moody =

Area of Port Moody, British Columbia

Coordinates: 49.3036°N 122.8751°W

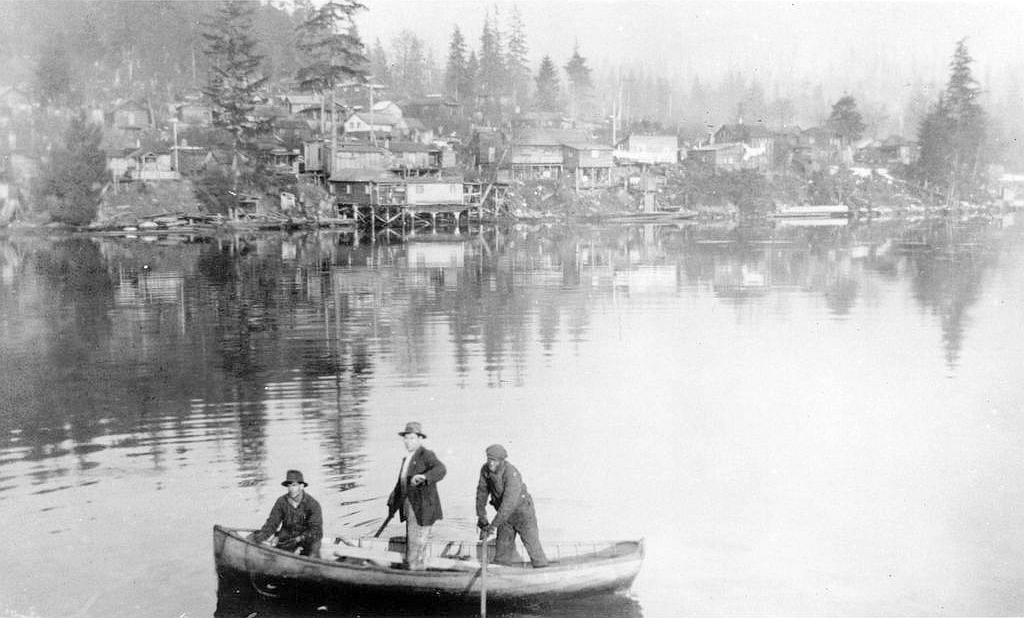
Ioco (c. 1914–1920)

Ioco is an area of Port Moody, British Columbia, located on the northern shore of the Burrard Inlet. Ioco, an abbreviation of Imperial Oil Corporation, was originally a townsite for an Imperial Oil refinery.

The refinery began operation in January 1915. By 1917, there were 200 people living in a shack town, which had a school and two grocery stores. The company wanted to buy land from the Federal government to build a townsite, but due to the land being a military reserve, they refused. Instead, they bought land from a private seller. The land was cleared and construction on houses began in 1920. In all, there were 83 houses built. The townsite also had a grocery store, community hall, a tennis court and lawn bowling green, and two churches.

As of 2015, the Ioco townsite has been sold to a Vancouver developer.
