= John Archibald Armstrong =

Canadian Business Executive

- Born: 24 March 1917; Dauphin, Manitoba
- Died: 26 December 2010 (aged 93); Nanaimo, British Columbia
- Education: University of Manitoba, (BSc, 1937); Queen's University, (BSc, 1942)
- Spouse: June Keith (m. 1943; died 1986)

John Archibald Armstrong OC (24 March 1917 – 26 December 2010) was a Canadian business executive.

Armstrong was chief executive officer of Imperial Oil from 1973 to 1981. He was also a director of the Royal Bank of Canada.

In 1983, he was made an Officer of the Order of Canada. He was inducted into the Canadian Petroleum Hall of Fame in 2004.

He died in his sleep in Nanaimo, British Columbia in 2010.
