= Avie Bennett =

Canadian businessman

- Born: January 2, 1928; Toronto
- Died: June 2, 2017 (aged 89); Toronto, Ontario
- Occupation: businessman
- Awards: Order of Canada; Order of Ontario

Avie Bennett, CC OOnt (January 2, 1928 – June 2, 2017) was a Canadian businessman and philanthropist. He was the founder of First Plazas, a real estate development company that built retail strip malls in Canada. Bennett also served as the tenth chancellor of York University.

== Work history ==
In 1985, he acquired the Canadian publishing company, McClelland & Stewart Inc. In 2000, he donated his shares, 75% of the company, to the University of Toronto. In 1991, he purchased Hurtig Publishers, publisher of the Canadian Encyclopedia, and the children's book publisher Tundra Books from May Cutler in 1995.

He was also chairman and president of First Plazas Inc., (his commercial real estate company), The Canadian Publishers; chair of the Historica Foundation of Canada; and president of the International Readings at Harbourfront.

== Honours ==
Avie Bennett received a Doctor of university (D.U.) from the University of Ottawa in 1997 and a Doctor of Laws (LL.D.) from the University of Toronto in 1995. In June 2004, Bennett was made a Doctor of Letters (D.Litt.) at York University

He was the tenth chancellor of York University from 1998 to 2004. After leaving the position, he was chancellor emeritus and a member of the board of directors of the York University Foundation. In recognition of his support of York University, the Student Services Centre at York's Keele campus was renamed the Bennett Centre for Student Services in 2006.

In 2003 he was appointed chair of The Historica Foundation of Canada. The Art Gallery of Ontario appointed him an honorary chair of the board of trustees in 2004.

In 1991 he was made a Member of the Order of Canada, promoted to Officer in 1997, and promoted to Companion in 2003. In 1996, he was awarded the Order of Ontario. He has received honorary degrees from the University of Ottawa, the University of Toronto and York University.

Academic offices
Preceded by Arden Haynes	Chancellor of York University; 1998–2004	Succeeded by Peter Cory
