= Jacob Lewis Englehart =

Canadian business magnate, entrepreneur (1847–1921)

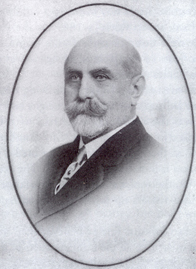
- Born: November 2, 1847; Cleveland, Ohio
- Died: April 1, 1921 (aged 73); Toronto, Ontario
- Occupations: Oil industry business magnate and philanthropist
- Spouse: Charlotte Eleanor Thompson

Jacob Lewis Englehart (November 2, 1847 – April 1, 1921) was a Canadian-American business magnate, entrepreneur and philanthropist. Englehart is best known for his role in the formation of Imperial Oil in 1880 to combat the growing influence of John D. Rockefeller's Standard Oil. Englehart was one of the most successful oil refiners in Canada during the 1800s and oversaw the completion of the Temiskaming and North Ontario Railway.

== Biography ==
=== Early life ===
Englehart was born in Cleveland, Ohio, on November 2, 1847. In 1860, he travelled to New York, where he found employment at Sonneborn, Dryfoos and Company as a salesman. The firm blended and sold whisky from various distilleries, and legal difficulties drove Englehart and his employers to emigrate to Canada in the spring of 1866. After arriving in Canada, Englehart grew interested in Ontario's oil market, and with the support of New York investors, he built an oil refinery in London that produced kerosene from the oil pumped from at Oil Springs and Petrolia. He also operated as a broker, buying kerosene from other Ontario refineries for shipment to markets in Europe and Asia. In an effort to control all oil refineries in Canada and drive up the price of kerosene by limiting production, Englehart partnered with Chicago Judge Ebenezer Higgins and set out to lease fifty-two Ontario refineries. The scheme fell apart in six months, and Englehart formed a kerosene refining partnership with Herman and Issac Waterman that was profitable until the Panic of 1873 and the discovery of oil reserves in Pennsylvania. In 1874, the partnership between Englehart and the Watermans was dissolved, and Englehart sold his London refinery to the London Refining Company.

After a two-year hiatus from the oil industry, Englehart reentered the scene in 1876 in partnership with Issac Guggenheim. With Guggenheim's financial backing, Englehart acquired the defunct Carbon Oil refinery in Petrolia and rebuilt it as the Silver Star Refinery. Englehart chose to build his refinery in Petrolia because of the Great Western Railway's expensive shipping rates. It became cheaper to have the oil refined closer to the source.

To encourage the construction of the refinery, Petrolia offered Englehart a five-year tax relief deal. When the Silver Star Refinery opened in January 1879, it was heralded as the largest and most modern of its kind in Canada, with state of the art equipment, an industrial agitator that could treat over 1,800 barrels and a 100,000-barrel reserve capacity. On-site, there was a barrel-making facility, plus a tin-making facility for shipping 10-barrel cans of refined oil to India, China, Japan, as well as Central and South America. Additionally, the refinery contained a boiler house, an engine house, a waterworks system with a 5,000 barrel tank and its own fire brigade. Overall, the Silver Star employed over 500 people, making it the largest employer in Petrolia until it closed down in 1898. Reportedly, Englehart always ensured the Silver Star was spotless and introduced many safety measures to prevent accidental explosions.

In 1882, Englehart, John Henry Fairbank and other businessmen from Petrolia formed the Crown Savings and Loan Company.

By all accounts, Englehart was always immaculately dressed, making him stand out in Ennskillen's industrial boomtown environment.

=== Imperial Oil ===
In April 1880, Englehart and sixteen leading refiners from London and Petrolia established Imperial Oil in response to Standard Oil's growing dominance in the oil market. Englehart was the driving force behind the partnership, hoping to amalgamate the entire Canadian oil industry, much as John D. Rockefeller was in the process of accomplishing in the United States. Englehart and the other refiners established Imperial Oil as a Joint Stock Company with a capitalized value of $500,000. Combined, the shareholders owned 12 refineries and 85 percent of the refining capacity in Canada. Imperial Oil's charter specified that their goal was to "find, produce, refine and distribute petroleum and its production throughout Canada." At the time of Imperial Oil's formation, Englehart was the largest shareholder, owning roughly 20 percent of the company, and was named the vice president. In a deliberate move to limit production and boost kerosene prices, Imperial closed every refinery in its possession except for the Silver Star in Petrolia and another in London. When the London refinery burnt down after being struck by lightning, Englehart concentrated Imperial's refining efforts in Petrolia.

Despite rising revenues throughout the 1890s, Imperial Oil did not have the capital to compete against Standard Oil, which was directing a chain of subsidiary companies across Canada. In 1895, Englehart and the board of directors attempted to sell the majority of shares in Imperial Oil to a British company- the Colonial Development Corporation for $585,000. The negotiations went on for three years with no successful outcome, and Imperial Oil's management instead chose to sell the company to Standard Oil. Under the deal, Standard Oil acquired 75 percent of Imperial Oil's shares, Imperial Oil would acquire all of Standard Oil's Canadian subsidiary companies, Imperial's capitalization would be increased to $1 million, and Imperial shareholders would receive a dividend of $93,000. Shortly after the deal took place, Standard Oil shut down the Silver Star refinery in Petrolia and moved Imperial Oil's refining operations to Sarnia. Englehart remained on Imperial Oil's Board of Directors after the buyout until his death in 1921.

=== Temiskaming and North Ontario Railway ===
In 1905, Ontario Premier James Whitney requested Englehart's aid in constructing the Temiskaming and North Ontario Railway. Englehart agreed to help and served as chairman of the commission from 1905 to 1920, overseeing the completion of the railroad. Reportedly, residents of Petrolia and employees at the Silver Star refinery were shocked at Englehart's departure, seeing his decision to support a railroad venture a "betrayal" due to their ongoing problems with high tariffs. In 1908, the town of Englehart was named after him.

When a fire in 1911 destroyed camps and towns along the railways, Englehart led efforts to raise relief funds for the affected workers and families. At the height of the disaster, Englehart posted a sign at the Englehart's train station that read: "No one need pass here hungry, J.L Englehart."

=== Marriage and children ===
Englehart married Charlotte Eleanor Thompson in 1891 at Petrolia's Christ Anglican Church. Shortly after the marriage, the couple built a red-bricked mansion in Petrolia, known as Glenview. Charlotte was highly involved in community affairs in Petrolia and stipulated in her will that upon the death of herself and Englehart, their home should be turned over to Petrolia for use as a hospital.

Although Englehart and Thompson were childless for 16 years, Thompson found out she was pregnant in 1908. She died on New Year's Eve 1908 due to complications of the pregnancy.

=== Philanthropy ===
In 1910, Englehart donated a set of tower bells to Petrolia's Christ Anglican Church. When the church burned to the ground on January 10, 1957, the church's tower and set of bells were the only part of the structure that survived.

After Charlotte's death in 1908, Englehart honoured his wife's wishes and donated Glenview mansion to Petrolia for use as a hospital. Named the Charlotte Eleanor Englehart Hospital, Englehart provided the institution with $36,000 in Imperial Oil shares, financing its operations for over fifty years. The hospital remains open today.

=== Death and afterward ===
On April 1, 1921, Englehart died from a brain hemorrhage at Wellesley Hospital, Toronto. Englehart's funeral was held at the Christ Anglican Church in Petrolia on April 9. Hundreds of citizens from Petrolia turned out to the funeral service, and shops closed throughout the day to pay their respects.

== Honours, decorations, awards and distinctions ==
In July 2016, the Jack Munroe Historical Society of Elk City posthumously awarded Englehart with the Order of the North for his work in building the Temiskaming and North Ontario Railway.

In Petrolia, a small park and street is named after Englehart.
