= Kap-Kig-Iwan Provincial Park =

Provincial park in Ontario, Canada

- IUCN category II (national park)
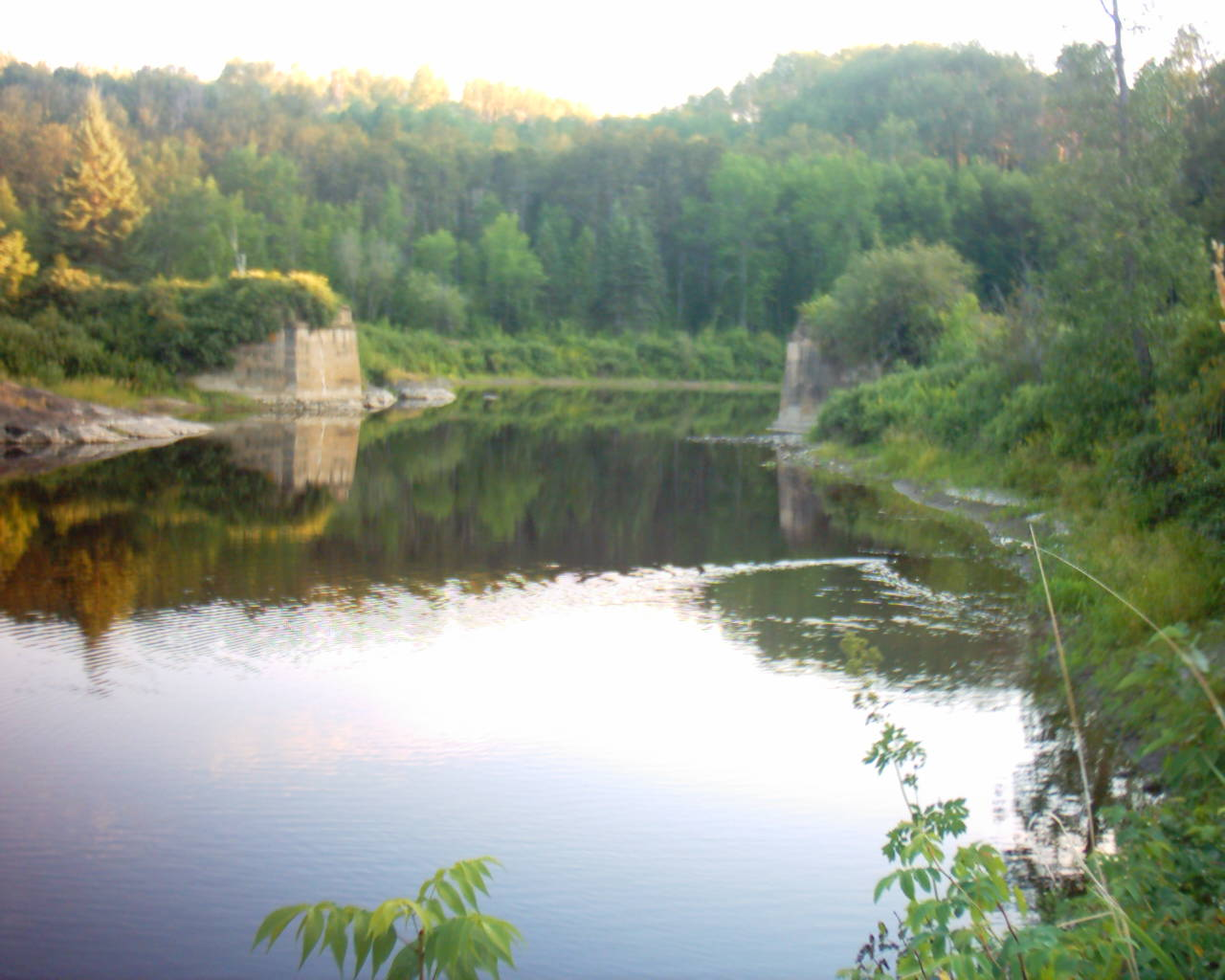

- Location within Ontario
- Interactive map of Kap-Kig-Iwan Provincial Park
- Location: Timiskaming District, Ontario, Canada
- Nearest city: Englehart
- Coordinates: 47°47′46″N 79°53′13″W
- Area: 325 hectares (803 acres)
- Established: 1957
- Visitors: 10,342 (in 2022)
- Governing body: Ontario Parks
- Website: www.ontarioparks.com/park/kapkigiwan

Kap-Kig-Iwan Provincial Park is a protected area in the incorporated townships of Charlton and Dack and Evanturel in Timiskaming District in Northeastern Ontario, Canada. Established in 1957, the 325-hectare (803-acre) park is located along the Englehart River, off Ontario Highway 11 about 2 kilometres (1.2 mi) south of the town of Englehart. Kap-Kig-Iwan is classified as a Natural Environment park and is a provincial park of Ontario.

Kap-Kig-Iwan has both electric and non-electric campsites. The park is often used by cross-country skiers during the winter months. Many of the trails double as ski trails.
