= Englehart =

- Town (single-tier)
- Town of Englehart
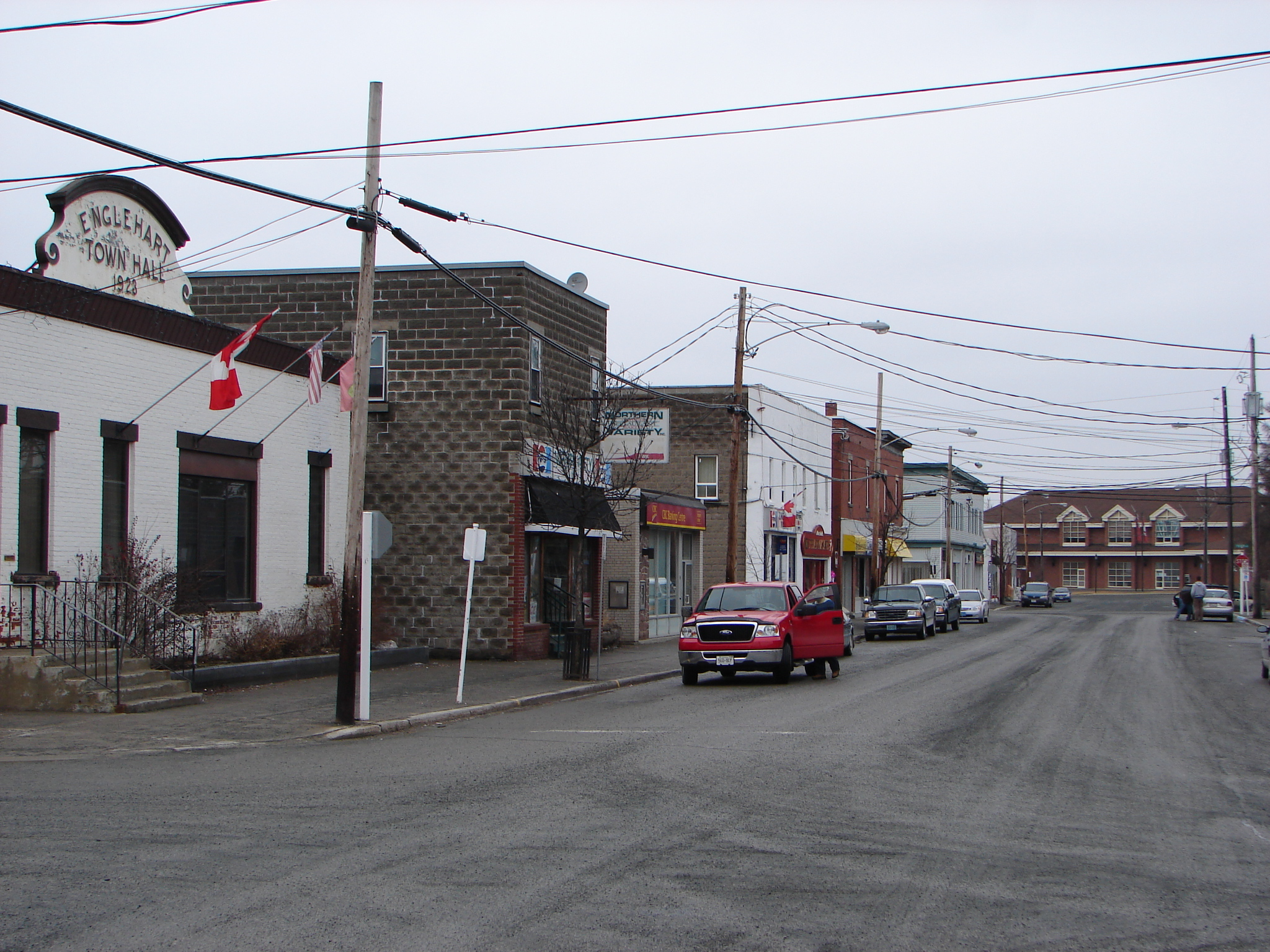
- Main street in Englehart, with the ONR train station visible at the end of the street.

- Location within Ontario
- Coordinates: 47°49′N 79°52′W
- Country: Canada
- Province: Ontario
- District: Timiskaming
- Established: 1900s
- Incorporated: 1908

Government
  - Mayor: Doug Metson

Area
  - Land: 2.92 km^{2} (1.13 sq mi)
- Elevation: 207 m (679 ft)

Population (2021)
  - Total: 1,442
  - Density: 494.2/km^{2} (1,280/sq mi)
- Time zone: UTC-5 (EST)
  - Summer (DST): UTC-4 (EDT)
- Postal code: P0J 1H0
- Area code: 705
- Website: www.englehart.ca

Englehart (2021 Canadian census population 1,442) is a town in the Canadian province of Ontario, located on the Englehart River in the Timiskaming District. The Kap-Kig-Iwan Provincial Park is located near the town.

== History ==
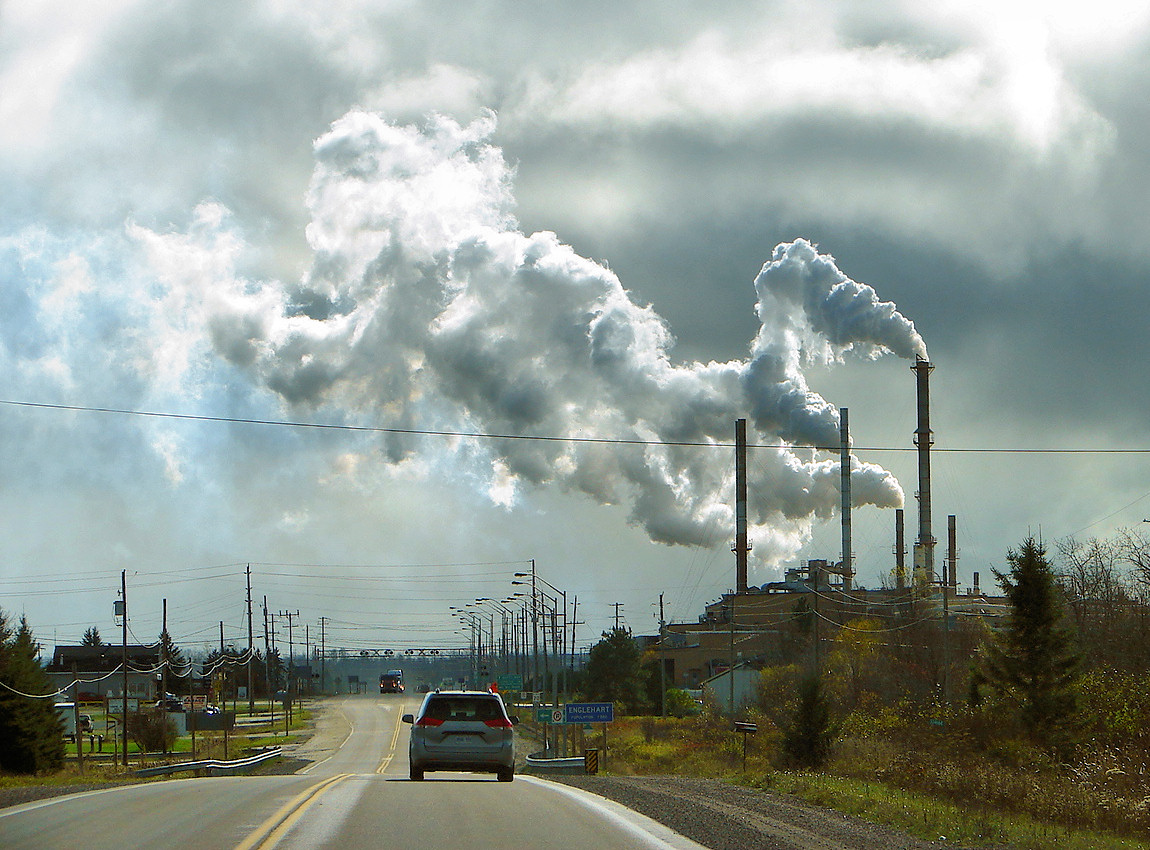
OSB plant in Englehart

The Town of Englehart was founded when the Temiskaming and Northern Ontario Railway (T & NO) was built through the area in the early 1900s, and named after Chairman Jacob Lewis Englehart. It was incorporated as the Town of Englehart in January 1908, as a half-way divisional point between North Bay and what became Cochrane, where the T & NO Railway met with the new National Transcontinental Railway line (now the CNR) being built west from Quebec City across the north to the Western Provinces, creating the town of Cochrane.

In 1905, Jacob Lewis Englehart, from Ohio, became a key figure in the development of the railway north of North Bay in Ontario. A successful businessman from Petrolia, Ontario, nearing the current age of retirement, he was appointed in 1905, by the Premier of Ontario, to the Ontario Commission in charge of building and operating the T & NO, which would, about 1945, become the Ontario Northland Railway. He served as Chairman of a new 3-man Commission from 1906 until the fall of 1919, when he retired after the United Farmers of Ontario won their first and only four-year term in the Province of Ontario. He died at York, now Toronto, in 1921 and was buried at Petrolia.

The new community of Englehart began to take shape with the construction of the line's first major bridge at the Charlton branch of Blanche River (Initially, there was a construction site for a high level trestle known as Blanche River Crossing, which opened in 1906. The Commission decided to develop a planned town on the west side of the river, from 1906-1908, as a half-way divisional point on the railway.

The railway was particularly central to the settlement and development of New Ontario (now N.E. Ont.); that is, until the first gravel road,(the Ferguson Highway, now part of Highway 11) was opened in 1927 north from North Bay to New Liskeard in the Temiskaming District, with future extensions north and west as the initial Trans-Canada Highway route.

The T & NO was eventually extended north to Moosonee on James Bay in the depression years of the 1930s. Today, Englehart's importance as a railway town has diminished, and the biggest employer is an oriented strand board (OSB) facility built by Grants Forest Products, which was sold to Georgia-Pacific in early 2010 as a result of the recession of 2008.

== Demographics ==
In the 2021 Census of Population conducted by Statistics Canada, Englehart had a population of 1,442 living in 684 of its 720 total private dwellings, a change of −2.5% from its 2016 population of 1,479. With a land area of 2.92 km^{2} (1.13 sq mi), it had a population density of 493.8/km^{2} (1,279.0/sq mi) in 2021.

Canada census – Englehart community profile

	2021	2016	2011
Population	1,442 (-2.5% from 2016)	1,479 (-2.6% from 2011)	1,519 (1.7% from 2006)
Land area	2.92 km^{2} (1.13 sq mi)	3.02 km^{2} (1.17 sq mi)	3.04 km^{2} (1.17 sq mi)
Population density	494.2/km^{2} (1,280/sq mi)	489.7/km^{2} (1,268/sq mi)	499.9/km^{2} (1,295/sq mi)
Median age	46.4 (M: 41.6, F: 50.8)	48.1 (M: 45.9, F: 49.8)	49.4 (M: 46.2, F: 52.0)
Private dwellings	720 (total) 684 (occupied)	711 (total)	727 (total)
Median household income	$67,500	$56,768

References: 2021 2016 2011

Historical census populations – Englehart

Year	Pop.	±%
1911	670	—
1921	759	+13.3%
1931	1,210	+59.4%
1941	1,262	+4.3%
1951	1,585	+25.6%
1956	1,705	+7.6%
1961	1,786	+4.8%

Year	Pop.	±%
1966	1,790	+0.2%
1971	1,721	−3.9%
1976	1,767	+2.7%
1981	1,686	−4.6%
1986	1,740	+3.2%
1991	1,726	−0.8%
1996	1,703	−1.3%

Year	Pop.	±%
2001	1,595	−6.3%
2006	1,494	−6.3%
2011	1,519	+1.7%
2016	1,479	−2.6%
2021	1,442	−2.5%

Source: Statistics Canada

== Media ==
CJBB-FM broadcasts a country music radio format from Englehart on 103.1 FM.

== Transportation ==
The Englehart railway station was served by the Northlander until the passenger service was ended in September 2012. Rail passenger service was replaced by increased bus service, also provided by Ontario Northland Railway. Englehart is located on Ontario Highway 11, part of the Trans-Canada Highway system.

On March 31, 2007, an Ontario Northland Railway freight train derailed about 15 kilometres (9.3 mi) north of Englehart, spilling an estimated 100 tonnes of sulfuric acid into a creek feeding the Blanche River.

== See also ==
- List of francophone communities in Ontario
- List of towns in Ontario
- List of townships in Ontario
- List of population centres in Ontario
