= Fallduck Lakes =

Group of lakes in Ontario, Canada

- Location in Ontario
- Location: Timiskaming District, Ontario
- Coordinates: 48°12′25″N 80°27′29″W
- Part of: Saint Lawrence River drainage basin
- Primary outflows: Englehart River
- Basin countries: Canada
- Max. length: 3.2 kilometres (2.0 mi)
- Max. width: .75 kilometres (0.5 mi)
- Surface elevation: 324 metres (1,063 ft)

Fallduck Lakes is a lake in geographic Terry Township, Timiskaming District in Northeastern Ontario, Canada. It is in the Saint Lawrence River drainage basin and is the source of the Englehart River.

There are three unnamed inflows at the north, west and east. The primary outflow is the Englehart River at the south, which flows via the Blanche River and Ottawa River to the Saint Lawrence River.

== See also ==
- List of lakes in Ontario
