= CJBB-FM =

Radio station in Englehart, Ontario, Canada

- Englehart, Ontario; Canada
- Frequency: 103.1 MHz
- Branding: Ranch Country 103.1

Programming
- Format: Country

Ownership
- Owner: Northern Radio Corp.

History
- First air date: September 14, 2001

Technical information
- Licensing authority: CRTC
- ERP: 1.6 kW (average); 2.94 kW (peak)
- HAAT: 74.3 metres (244 ft)
- Transmitter coordinates: 47°49′48″N 79°55′50″W

Links
- Website: ranchcountry103.com

CJBB-FM is a Canadian radio station, which broadcasts a country format at 103.1 FM in Englehart, Ontario.

The station received CRTC approval on September 9, 1999.

On March 20, 2001, CJBB-FM received CRTC approval to increase their effective radiated power (ERP) from 17 watts to 1,600 watts.

On March 27, 2018, Northern Radio Corp. (Northern Radio) submitted an application for authority to acquire from 1353151 Ontario Inc. the assets of the English-language commercial FM radio station CJBB-FM Englehart. The application was approved on July 3, 2018.

The station adopted the new branding 103.1 FM The Train in late 2018. Another format change happened in 2021, with the station adopting the new brand Ranch Country 103.1.
