= Middleton Creek (Tennessee) =

Stream in Tennessee, United States

Coordinates: 35.3466°N 88.3188°W

Middleton Creek is a stream in the U.S. state of Tennessee.

Middleton Creek has the name of John Middleton, who settled there in the 1820s. A variant name was "Middletons Creek".
