= Charlton and Dack =

- Municipality (single-tier)
- Municipality of Charlton and Dack
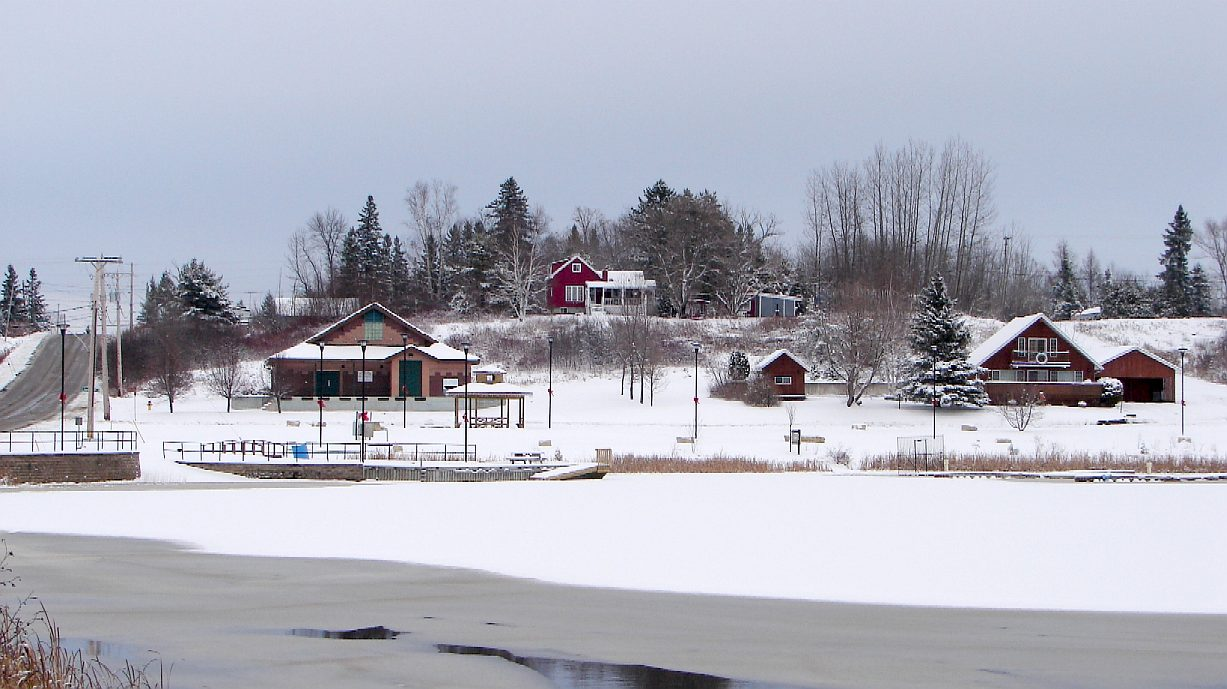

- Location within Ontario
- Coordinates: 47°48′30″N 80°00′00″W
- Country: Canada
- Province: Ontario
- District: Timiskaming
- Settled: 1900s
- Incorporated: January 1, 2003

Government
  - Type: Township
  - Reeve: Sandra Dawn Parkin
  - Fed. riding: Nipissing—Timiskaming
  - Prov. riding: Timiskaming—Cochrane

Area
  - Land: 92.74 km^{2} (35.81 sq mi)

Population (2021)
  - Total: 686
  - Density: 7.4/km^{2} (19/sq mi)
- Time zone: UTC-5 (EST)
  - Summer (DST): UTC-4 (EDT)
- Postal Code: P0J
- Area code: 705
- Website: www.charltonanddack.com

Charlton and Dack is a municipality in the Canadian province of Ontario, located within the Timiskaming District. Its population in 2021 was 686.

The municipality was incorporated on January 1, 2003, by amalgamating the former Town of Charlton with the former Township of Dack.

== Geography ==
Charlton and Dack is a small community located in North Eastern Ontario along Highway 11 and along the shoreline of Long Lake. The municipality, only a thirty-minute drive to either Temiskaming Shores and Kirkland Lake, is covered from one end to the other with forested rolling hills and fertile farmland.

== History ==
The Town of Charlton began as a settlement on the banks of the Englehart River within the Township of Dack. The Town's development was influenced by the large expanses of timber in the area and saw mills were established as early as 1903. In 1904, the lands on the east and west side of the river were surveyed into lots. To date, the Town's land use patterns have reflected the grid set out by the early settlers. The first settlers to the Township of Dack were attracted to the area for its agriculture and timber potential. At the turn of the 20th century land was cleared, farming began and homes were built.

=== Early settlement in Northern Ontario ===
There were a couple of significant events which led to the settlement of Northern Ontario. First there was a large population boom in Canada between 1881 and 1900. Many people emigrated from Europe in hopes of a bright future. The second was that the limits of Ontario had expanded to James and Hudson Bay and Northern Ontario became known as "New Ontario", 330,000 square miles (850,000 km^{2}) of land). People were curious as to what kind of natural resources were in New Ontario. Surveyors divided the land into townships; Alex Niven surveyed Dack Township in 1887. They began selling crown land for 50 cents/acre ($124/km²) and the land sold quickly. From 1897-1901 80,000 acres (320 km^{2}) of land had been sold in the Temiskaming area. The government had placed restrictions on the sale of each piece of property as a way to prevent speculators from buying up all of the land. Property owners were required to clear at least 15 acres (61,000 m^{2}) of land, build a 16x20ft house, and spend a certain amount of time on the property. Veterans of the Fenian Raids and the Boer Wars were given free land in the North.

Purchasing land in the north was the easy part, the journey was a different story. Settlers had the choice of two routes to take to Charlton. They could make a 30-mile (48 km) walk from New Liskeard or take a steamboat up the Blanche River (Englehart River) to Tomstown and continue the remainder of the journey over land. Both were very difficult routes to take, but somehow they made it to Dack Township.

There were a few major developments between 1902 and 1904 that continued to bring people to the area and keep them here. In February 1902, Premier Ross proposed a bill for the Temiskaming Northern Ontario Railway Commission, and it was not long before there was a railway from Quebec, through the Clay Belt, and on to Winnipeg. By 1904, the railway made it all the way to Englehart. This was one of the first stages to developing the north. Secondly, Temiskaming was introduced to a mineral rush in 1903 when the first piece of silver was found lying on the ground in Cobalt.

=== Early days in Charlton and Dack ===
In the early days, Dack Township was attractive for many reasons, not the least of which were its ingredients for a successful logging industry. It is believed that many of the settlers were from the Ottawa Valley area, who were skilled in logging and farming. It was not long before they began to build houses and businesses and soon a community was created. As more people arrived a post office was built, which started the debate over what the community would be called. It was eventually decided that they would name it after the MP for Norfolk at the time, John M. Charlton.

The first church in Charlton was built in 1905. It was Presbyterian by denomination, but many different faiths pitched in to build the church. The church was not just for Presbyterians, it was for the entire community, and it was used as a school for the children of Charlton during the week.

=== Early businesses and industry ===
Many buildings were constructed in Charlton, including a general store, sawmills, churches and the post office. By 1904, there were two sawmills operating in town. The first sawmill was owned and operated by Louis Hawkesworth, who set up a mill 1 mile (2 km) up the river on the south side. The second mill was opened by Stephen Ryan on the east side of the falls, he set up a dam using rocks and timber to create a water powered sawmill complete with trimmer and edger. In 1907, Early Ryckman built a sawmill on Tamarac Creek, which was later moved to the current beach site on Long Lake. That same year another sawmill was built in west Charlton. Throughout the years new mills came and went.

Unemployment was not an issue during this boom period. Almost all of the men were employed, and there was plenty that needed to be done. At the mill men were needed to feed the logs into the mill, to cut and trim the logs, to pile and sort the logs, and of course transport the logs to the railway. Farmers even found employment for themselves during the winter months. After the harvest they would bring their team of horses to the lumber camps and work all season.

The lake and river were often so busy from the logging industry, confrontation between the mill owners became common. One crew would be trying to send their logs down the river, while another was trying to get their supplies up the river.

=== Early transportation ===
The development of roads and methods of transportation came quite quickly to Charlton. It was necessary to have efficient transportation to support the growing industry. They needed to get their lumber and crops out of the town and get supplies into the town. Once the railway came to Charlton the products could easily get shipped out to a growing market. The first road to come to Charlton was built in 1904 and came from Tomstown. The second road came from Englehart through to Charlton in 1905. In 1907 a road was built all the way to Elk Lake. The settlers quickly realized the potential for the Blanche River (The Englehart River) as a transportation route. There was a business interest in this mode of transportation; soon gasoline boats, steamboats, and canoes were used to travel the lakes and rivers. In 1907 The Long Lake Navigation Company sent 3 gasoline launches to Charlton. Northern Ontario Steam Navigation Company launched the "Britannia" into service in the Lake. The railway coming to Charlton reaffirmed its success, in 1908, the T & NO Railway arrived in Charlton. During the Elk Lake- Gowganda Rush, the train brought supplies to the prospectors from Charlton. The railway gave Charlton a real economic boost and while passenger service ended in the 1930s, freight service continued until 1954.

=== Charlton-Englehart Electric Light & Power Company ===
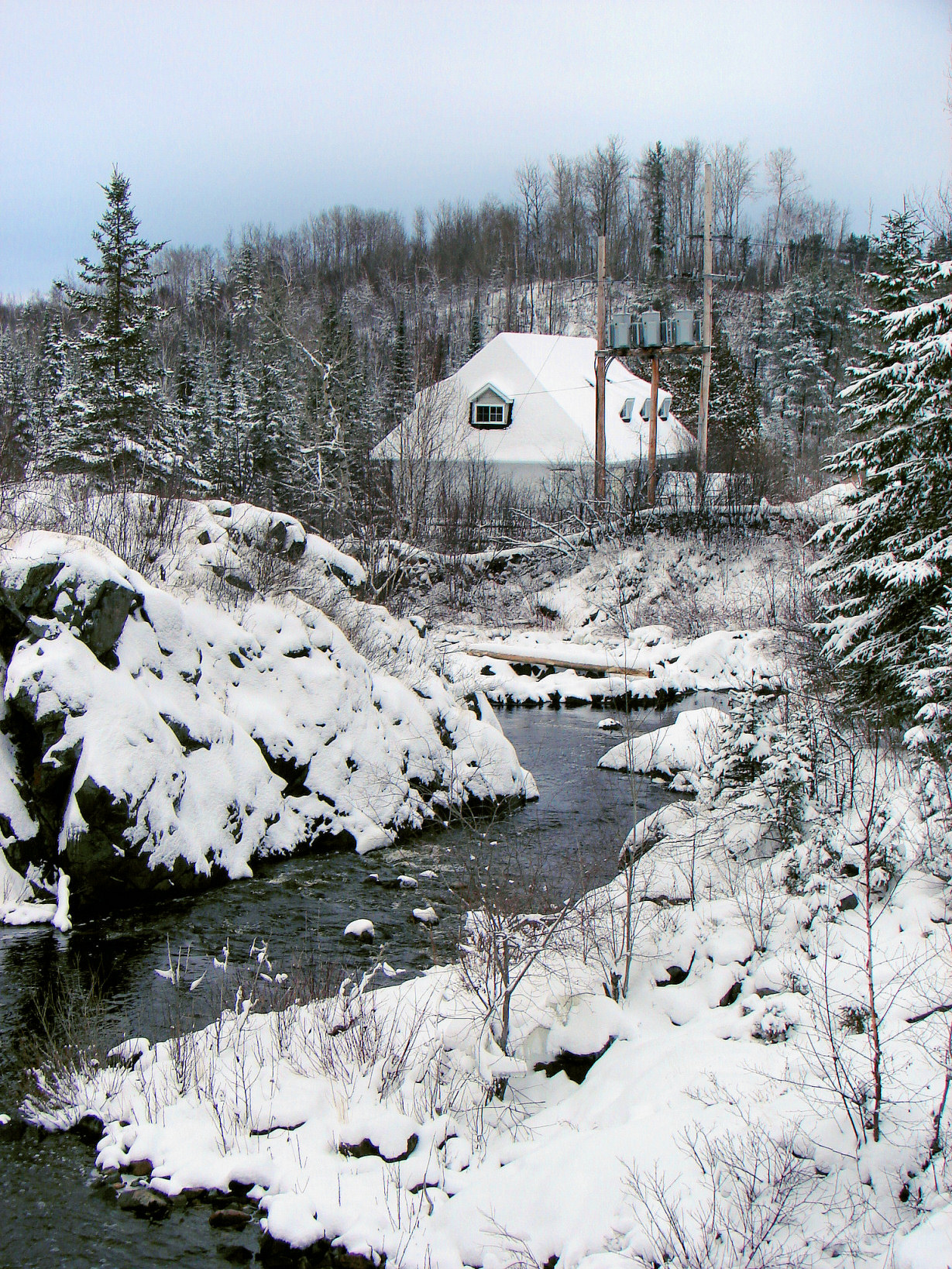
The Charlton Power House was built in 1914 and provided hydro-electric power to Charlton and Englehart. It was one of the buildings in Charlton to survive the Great Fire of 1922 along with the station masters house, sheltering many persons during that event. From 1944 to 1963 it was used as a gristmill.

An immigrant from Syria, by the name of "Big Pete" Farah ended up in the New Liskeard area around 1900. He was an ambitious businessman, who did a lot for the area. He built the Canada Hotel, made claims to minerals in Cobalt and grew to be a very rich man. He supplied New Liskeard with their first hydro site, what is today called Pete's Dam. It was not long before "Big Pete" came to Charlton and bought Stephen Ryan's water powered sawmill, including its power reserve at the falls. A few years later he sold all of his equipment and converted his business into a hydro company. He literally lit Charlton up with this conversion and by 1911, hydro was reaching as far as Englehart. He made plans to build an even bigger powerhouse, which he completed in 1914. A power line to the Tough-Oakes Mine in Kirkland Lake from Charlton carried 33,000 volts on a 26-mile (42 km) transmission line. In 1917, Farah sold his powerhouse to the Northern Ontario Light & Power Company.

=== Early agriculture ===
The first crops to grow in the township were cultivated with a grub hoe and were planted and harvested by hand and yielded an incredible harvest. The fertile land of the Clay Belt was quite impressive to the farmers from the Ottawa Valley who were used to large rocks in their soil. A lot of times those working at the sawmill would clear a small piece of their land and plant a small crop, which required little attention. The nearby rush in Elk Lake created much demand for crops from the Charlton farmers.

=== Fair ===
In 1907, the Charlton Agricultural Society was formed and there has been a fair every year since. There were displays of war souvenirs from the Boer War and the Riel Rebellion. Displays of agriculture and contests were an attraction. The fair grounds were purchased and are still the location used for the Charlton Fall Fair. Fairgrounds were sold off in 2021. The last fair was held in 2019 prior to covid.

=== Incorporation ===
In the fall of 1908, the residents of Dack sent a petition and an application to incorporate the township. Incorporation was granted and elections were called for January 1909. In 1909 or 1910 a courthouse/town hall was built on the corner of Bay St. and Robert St. in Charlton. The building contained offices, a meeting room and two jail cells. After the incorporation of the Town of Charlton, the courthouse was sold by Dack Township to the town of Charlton. The Township of Dack continued to use the building following the sale and paid Charlton monthly rent. The township of Dack took care of the Charlton affairs up until Charlton's incorporation in 1915.

During the war, however, Charlton was more concerned about their local politics and were planning to incorporate. At the end of 1914 the community of Charlton sent their petition to incorporate and at the beginning of 1915 incorporation became reality.

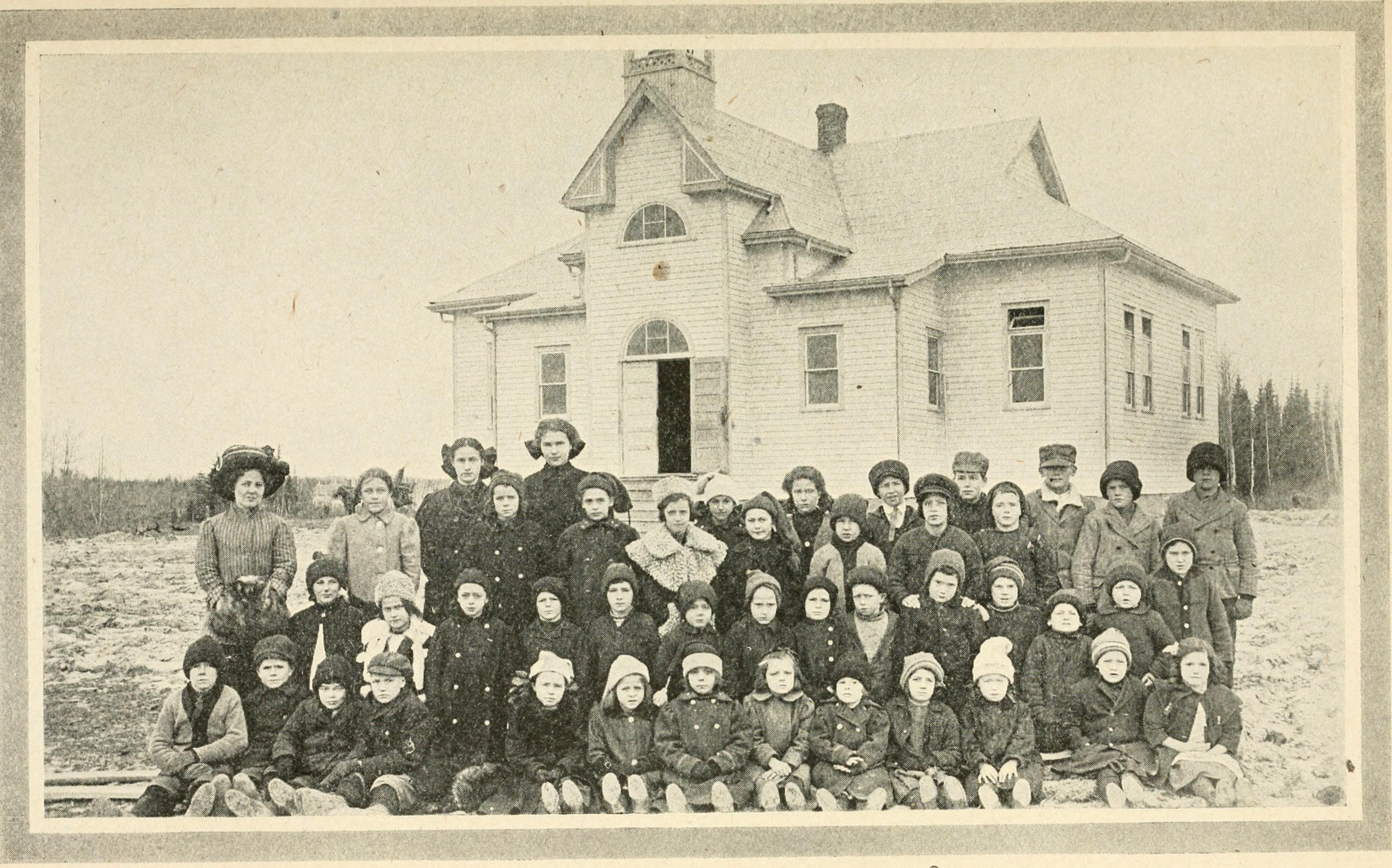
Public School, Charlton, Ontario, 1917

In 1916 good labour was in demand and the wages were quite high, because of the number of men sent off to war. The Duke and Duchess of Devonshire came for a visit to Englehart and all of the Charlton school children took the train to Englehart to wave at the royal couple.

=== The Great Fire of 1922 ===
A devastating turn of events came in the fall of 1922, when a fire destroyed the Town of Charlton and the Township of Dack almost completely. The area was speckled with small brush fires that had nearly died out during the night, but that morning a breeze swept through the area and ignited the almost extinguished coals. The wind got stronger and stronger and the small fires grew into big fires and eventually into one large fire. Charlton's fire is believed to have originated in the Township of Savard, however, there were other fires in southern Temiskaming that contributed to the destruction. The Great Fire killed 43 people, destroyed over 1000 kilometres of farmland and displaced over 6,000 people from their homes. As the fire approached the Town of Charlton the men tried to pacify the fire, while the women and children ran for safety. Many ran towards the river and others towards the powerhouse, which was one of the few remaining buildings once the fire seized. As night fell upon the town the residents sought shelter at the powerhouse, the station house and a farm that had not been destroyed. On the morning of the fire, the weather was that of a typical Indian Summer. This meant that many people were only wearing light clothes. The weather shifted the night of the fire to bitter cold (including snowfall).

The 1922 fire completely devastated Charlton, their main industry had been destroyed, all the infrastructure had been burned to the ground, and nearly everyone had lost their home. Following the fire, time was spent assessing the damage and burying loved ones. Old streetcars from Toronto were brought in as temporary shelter for the newly homeless residents of the community. The residents of Charlton maintained their optimistic spirit and were able to make the best of the situation. The exhibit hall at the fair grounds was used as a temporary post office. Support came from the Provincial Government, who agreed to take care of the unpaid taxes of burned out municipalities for the year.

The loss of the main industries meant that people began to move out of the area to seek work in other places. The decreased population required much less amenities than in the pre-fire days, fewer stores were needed and only a few were rebuilt. It took 28 years after the fire for Charlton to get electricity again, even though the surrounding townships saw power after only a few days.

In the 1970s people began to move back to the area and build new homes.

== Demographics ==
In the 2021 Census of Population conducted by Statistics Canada, Charlton and Dack had a population of 686 living in 261 of its 280 total private dwellings, a change of 0% from its 2016 population of 686. With a land area of 92.74 km^{2} (35.81 sq mi), it had a population density of 7.4/km^{2} (19.2/sq mi) in 2021.

Historical census populations – Charlton and Dack
Year	Pop.	±%
2001	702	—
2006	613	−12.7%
2011	671	+9.5%
2016	686	+2.2%
2021	686	+0.0%
Source: Statistics Canada

Historical census populations – Charlton Town (1915–2002)

Year	Pop.	±%
1911	412	—
1921	405	−1.7%
1931	225	−44.4%
1941	210	−6.7%
1951	169	−19.5%

Year	Pop.	±%
1956	159	−5.9%
1961	157	−1.3%
1966	147	−6.4%
1971	131	−10.9%
1976	189	+44.3%

Year	Pop.	±%
1981	213	+12.7%
1986	237	+11.3%
1991	279	+17.7%
1996	297	+6.5%
2001	276	−7.1%

Source: Statistics Canada

Historical census populations – Dack Township (1908–2002)

Year	Pop.	±%
1911	322	—
1921	380	+18.0%
1931	440	+15.8%
1941	533	+21.1%
1951	465	−12.8%

Year	Pop.	±%
1956	452	−2.8%
1961	507	+12.2%
1966	458	−9.7%
1971	429	−6.3%
1976	416	−3.0%

Year	Pop.	±%
1981	420	+1.0%
1986	439	+4.5%
1991	475	+8.2%
1996	478	+0.6%
2001	426	−10.9%

Source: Statistics Canada

== Attractions ==
Hunters, anglers and families have come to the area for years. Charlton and Dack is home to Moose Haven Lodge, Rosepoint Lodge and Trailer Park, Timberline Lodge, Tamarac Lodge and Jamieson Cottages and Camping.

In the winter, snowmobile trails are an attraction for locals and visitors. In addition, many enjoy ice fishing or cross-country skiing. Charlton and Dack provides residents and visitors with an outdoor skating rink, which is free for public use and is available for rent for private use. Kap-Kig-Iwan Provincial Park is an attraction for visitors from all across Canada. The park has three hiking trails, which vary in difficulty, a picnic area, and many places to bird watch.

The town's Heritage Centre is a source for historical information on the municipality, which is also the town's former town hall. The building still contains two jail cells. The Kagawon Powerhouse, which is still functional today, was the first source of hydro for the area in 1914. The original building was used as shelter in the 1922 fire.

== See also ==
- List of francophone communities in Ontario
- List of townships in Ontario
