= Marter, Ontario =

Marter
- Unincorporated community

- Location in Ontario
- Coordinates: 47°53′07″N 79°48′08″W
- Country: Canada
- Province: Ontario
- District: Timiskaming
- Census subdiv.: Unorganized West
- Time zone: UTC-5 (Eastern Time Zone)
  - Summer (DST): UTC-4 (Eastern Time Zone)
- Postal code FSA: P0J
- Area codes: 705, 249

Marter is an unincorporated community in geographic Marter Township in the Unorganized West part of Timiskaming District in Northeastern Ontario, Canada. Ontario Highway 624 runs through the community, which is named for George Frederick Marter.

The mouth of the Englehart River at the Blanche River is located in the township; the Blanche River flows from the northwest corner to the south centre border of the township. The community of Marter is in the centre of the township.
