= Imperial Oil =

Canadian petroleum company

Imperial Oil Limited
- Type: Public subsidiary
- Traded as: TSX: IMO; AMEX: IMO; S&P/TSX 60 component
- Industry: Oil and gas
- Founded: 1880; 146 years ago
- Headquarters: Calgary, Alberta, Canada
- Key people: John Whelan, Chairman (president & CEO)
- Products: Petroleum; Petrochemicals; Natural gas
- Production output: 438 thousand barrels of oil equivalent (2,680,000 GJ) per day (2025)
- Revenue: ▼CA$47.078 billion (2025)
- Net income: ▼CA$3.268 billion (2025)
- Total assets: ▼CA$42.309 billion (2025)
- Total equity: ▼CA$22.254 billion (2025)
- Number of employees: 5,100 (2025)
- Parent: ExxonMobil (69.6%)
- Website: www.imperialoil.ca

Imperial Oil Limited (French: Compagnie Pétrolière Impériale Ltée) is a Canadian petroleum company. It is Canada's second-largest integrated oil company and is also occasionally known as Imperial Esso. It is majority-owned by American oil company ExxonMobil, with a 69.6% ownership stake in the company. It is a producer of crude oil, diluted bitumen, and natural gas. Imperial Oil is one of Canada's major petroleum refiners and petrochemical producers. It supplies Esso-brand service stations.

Imperial owns 25% of Syncrude, which is one of the world's largest oil sands operations. It also has holdings in the Alberta Oil Sands, and operates the Kearl Oil Sands mining operation with ExxonMobil.

Imperial Oil is headquartered in Calgary, Alberta. It was based in Toronto, Ontario, until 2005. Most of Imperial's production is from its natural resource holdings in the Alberta oil sands and the Norman Wells oil field in the Northwest Territories.

Imperial Oil was ranked 34th in the Arctic Environmental Responsibility Index (AERI) for 2021 out of 120 mining, oil, and gas corporations that extract resources north of the Arctic Circle.

== History ==
=== Founding and early years ===
In April 1880, Jacob Lewis Englehart and 16 prominent oil refiners in London, Ontario, and Petrolia, Ontario, formed Imperial Oil in response to Standard Oil's growing dominance of the oil market. Englehart aimed to emulate John D. Rockefeller and merge the entire Canadian oil industry into one conglomerate. Although the majority of Ontario's top oil producers agreed to join in the enterprise, exceptions included John Henry Fairbank, who was then Canada's largest oil producer, and James Miller Williams, founder of the Canadian Oil Company. Englehart and the refiners established Imperial Oil as a joint-stock company with a capitalized value of $500,000. In addition to Englehart, the original shareholders included Frederick A. Fitzgerald, Isaac and Herman Waterman, William Spencer and his sons William and Charles, Thomas and Edward Hodgins, John Geary, Joseph Fallows, John Minhinnick, William English and John Walker. Together, the shareholders possessed twelve oil refineries and controlled 85% of the refining capacity in Canada. Fitzgerald and Englehart were the two largest stakeholders in the company and were named the president and vice president, respectively. Imperial Oil's charter noted that its goal was to "find, produce, refine and distribute petroleum and its products throughout Canada."

Despite its early successes, Imperial Oil struggled to make a profit and issue dividends in the early 1880s. The discovery of new oil fields in Pennsylvania and New York drove down the price of oil, and the creation of the Standard Oil Trust resulted in an increase of American oil imports into Canada. In a move to boost kerosene prices, Imperial closed down ten of the twelve refineries it had acquired through the merger, leaving only the Silver Star refinery in Petrolia and the Victor works in London. In 1883, the Victor works was struck by lightning and burned to the ground, and under Englehart's direction, the company concentrated its refining efforts at Petrolia.

=== Herman Frasch and the sulphur dilemma ===
In 1884, Imperial Oil purchased the exclusive use of Herman Frasch's fractional distillation patent, which was more efficient at separating crude oil into usable products. Imperial initially offered Frasch $10,000 and Imperial Oil stock, but he persuaded the company to offer him a salary that matched Fitzgerald's and a seat on the Board of Directors. Frasch had taken the position primarily to supervise the installation of his refining method at the Silver Star refinery and resigned in February 1885 once the work was complete. Frasch then joined John Minhinnick in forming a separate venture called the Empire Oil Company. The pair purchased an idle refinery in London, and Frasch began experimenting on a way to remove the sulphur content in the oil pumped at Lambton County. The high sulphur content in Canadian oil placed it at a disadvantage compared to the oil mined at Pennsylvania due to its "distinctive odour" when burned. Canadians called the product "skunk oil". Between 1885 and 1887, Frasch discovered that mixing copper oxide with the oil during the distilling process would remove the sulphur content and odour from the refined product.

By this time, Standard Oil had also become interested in the desulphurization process after moving production to oil fields in Ohio that had a similar sulphur content to Lambton County. In 1886, Standard Oil persuaded Frasch to return to the United States and join their company by offering "a salary higher than that of any other scientist in the country" and an exchange of his shares in the Empire Oil Company for an equivalent amount in Standard Oil. After returning to the United States, Frasch perfected his desulphurization strategy, and Standard Oil held a monopoly on the process until 1905.

=== The 1890s and the Standard Oil buyout ===
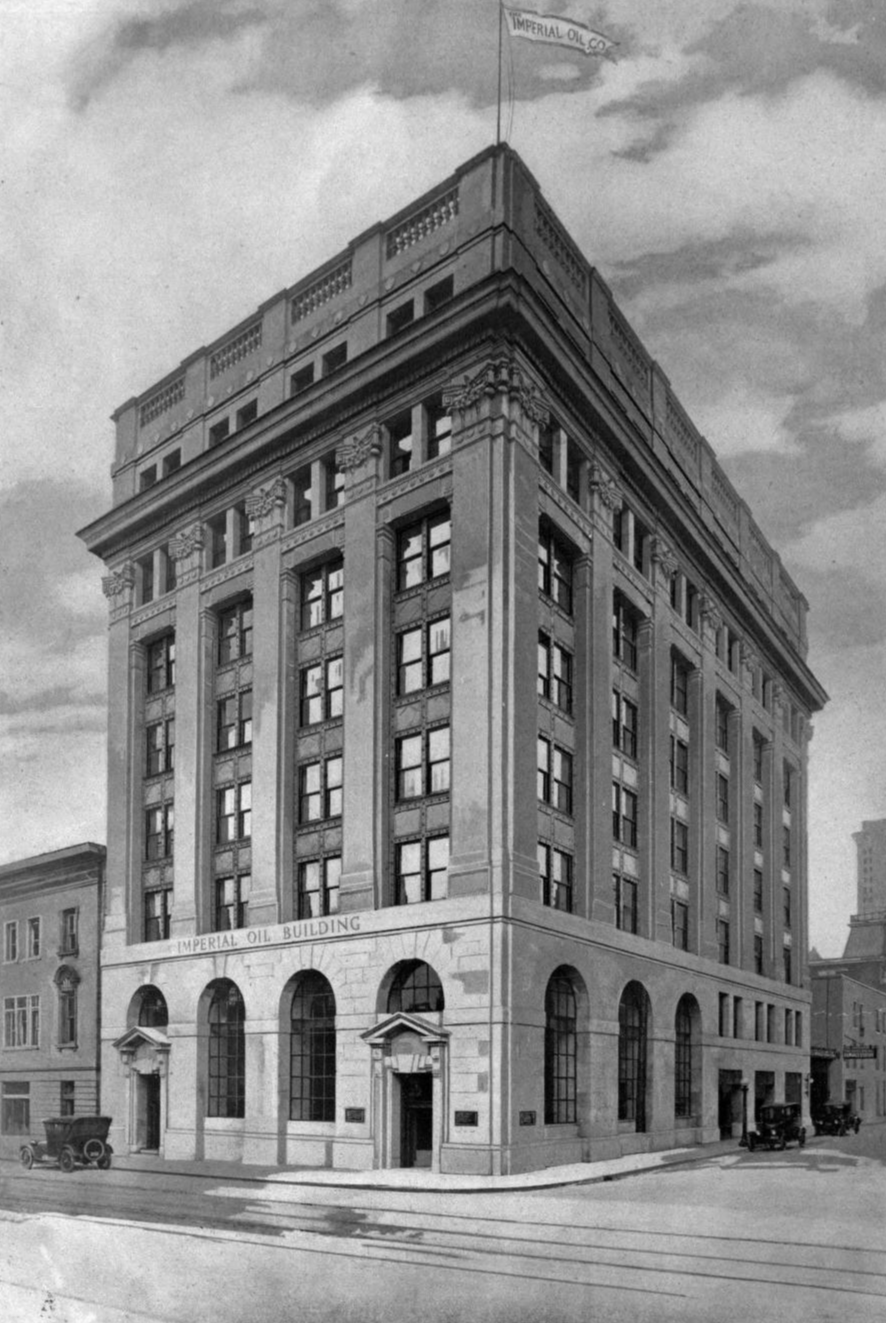
The Imperial Oil Building at 56 Church Street in Toronto was the company's headquarters from 1917 to 1957. It was designed by Clinton and Russell of New York and demolished in 1969.

Despite rising revenue and growth in the 1890s, Imperial Oil faced continuing challenges in its markets, primarily from Standard Oil, which operated a series of subsidiary companies across Canada. Although Imperial dominated the Western Canadian market, the company could not establish a strong foothold in the Maritimes or Quebec as Standard supplied these regions through long-term contracts with local companies. While the Conservative Party's National Policy had stopped Standard Oil from fully entering the Canadian market, the economic policy came under attack by Standard Oil lobbyists and Canadian consumers, who asked for a cheaper and higher quality product. In 1893, Ottawa reduced import duties on refined oil products from 7.2 cents to 6 cents per wine gallon, and in 1896, Wilfrid Laurier's government reduced the tariff again to 5 cents. Additionally, Laurier removed restrictions on tank cars and tank steamers, allowing foreign companies to bulk ship oil into Canada by rail or sea. Before, foreign companies had to repackage their product into oil barrels before entering Canada, adding roughly five cents in shipping and handling charges to each gallon of imported oil.

In 1895, Imperial Oil's Board of Directors began negotiations to sell the company to the Colonial Development Corporation, a British company. After three years, the deal collapsed, and the Board of Directors instead chose to sell the company to Standard Oil. The agreement specified that Standard Oil would acquire 75% of Imperial Oil's shares, Imperial Oil would acquire all of Standard Oil's Canadian subsidiary companies, Imperial's capitalization would be increased to $1 million, and Imperial shareholders would receive a dividend of $93,000. Following the deal, Imperial Oil shut down the Silver Star refinery in Petrolia and moved its refining operations to Sarnia, Ontario.

=== Later years ===
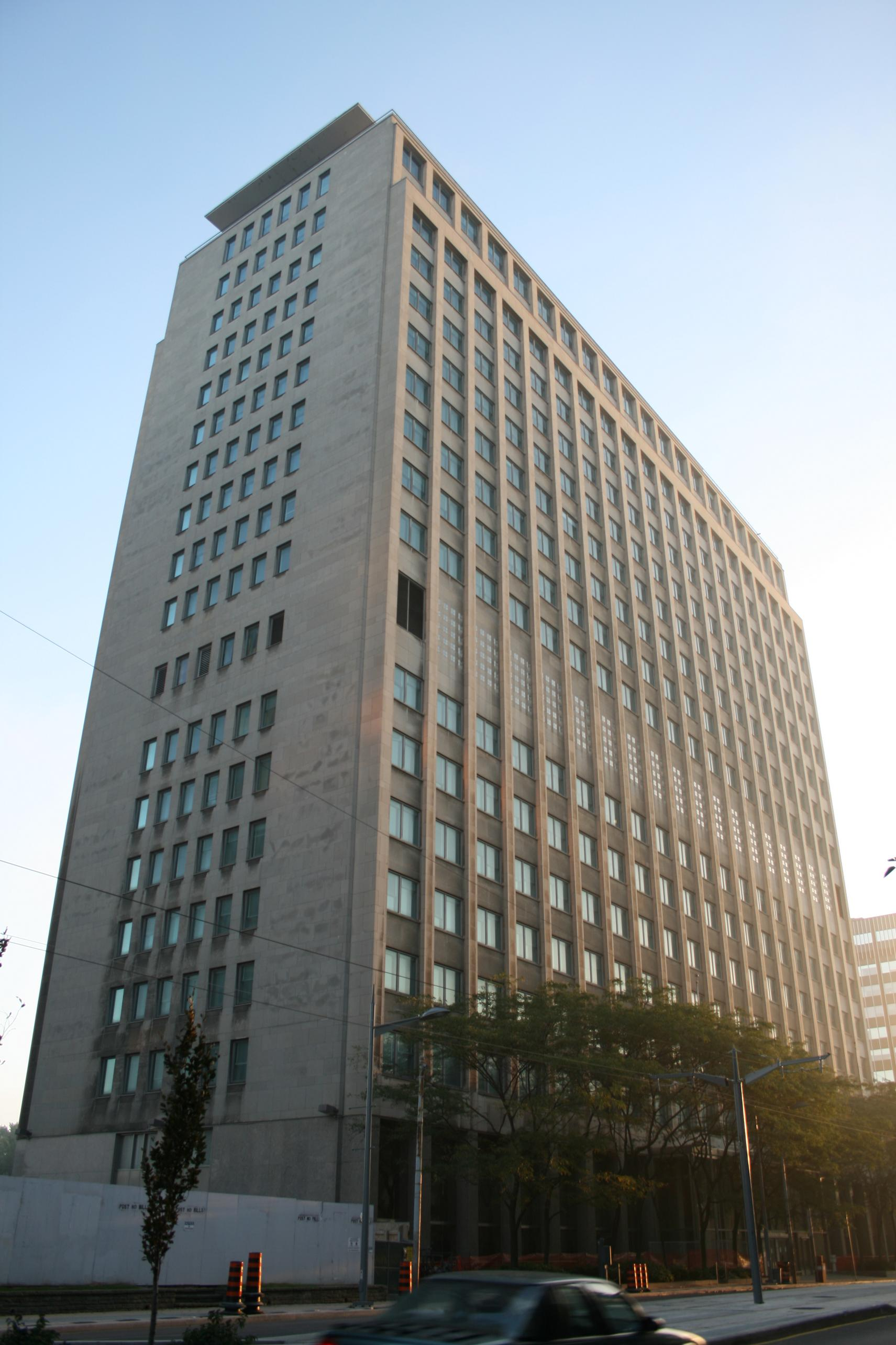
From 1957 to 2004, the company was headquartered in the Imperial Oil Building, designed by Mathers & Haldenby. The design was a failed entry in the competition for a new Toronto City Hall.

In a landmark 1911 anti-trust case, the U.S. Supreme Court ordered Standard Oil to break up into 34 separate companies. Ownership of Imperial Oil, as well Standard Oil's other subsidiaries outside the U.S., were all transferred to only one of those 34 successor firms, Jersey Standard (later renamed Exxon).

Imperial Oil discovered the Leduc Woodbend Devonian oil reef in 1947, marking the beginning of the contemporary period in Canadian oil and gas development. Drilling began on the landmark discovery well Leduc No. 1 on November 20, 1946.

In 1989, Imperial Oil acquired Texaco's Canadian operations.

When Exxon and Mobil merged in 1999 to form ExxonMobil, the combined company continued to maintain Mobil's Canadian operations as a separate subsidiary, independent of Imperial Oil.

Although ExxonMobil and Imperial are legally separate companies they have a very unique relationship. ExxonMobil provides, IT, procurement, payroll and technical services to Imperial through several service agreements. Imperial in the early 2000s was the operator of ExxonMobil Canada's assets in Canada. ExxonMobil also provides financing to Imperial. Many of the CEOs and board members of Imperial over the years were employees of ExxonMobil. Both companies also subcontract employees to each other. Despite this, the two companies have a clear policy of "corporate separateness" and are individually listed on the stock exchange. Ownership of Imperial stock does not reflect ownership of ExxonMobil but ownership of ExxonMobil stock represents ownership of the 69.6% share of Imperial stock ExxonMobil has.

=== Film and television ===
From the 1934-35 season through the 1975-76 season, Imperial Oil was a sponsor of the CBC Television program Hockey Night in Canada for both radio and television broadcasts. Esso, which had three stars on their signs, sponsored Hockey Night in Canada's three stars of the game.

In the same era, the company was also involved in film production, providing funding for independent documentary films. Glenbow Museum in Calgary holds a large collection of Imperial Oil's film inventory.

== Leadership ==
=== President ===
1. Frederick Ardiel Fitzgerald, 1880–1889
2. Frank Quarles Barstow, 1889–1908
3. Horace Chamberlain, 1908–1911
4. Walter Clark Teagle, 1914–1918
5. William John Hanna, 1918–1919
6. Charles Orrin Stillman Jr., 1919–1933
7. Gilead Harrison Smith, 1933–1944
8. Richard Vryling LeSueur, 1944–1945
9. Henry Hugo Hewetson, 1945–1949
10. George Lawrence Stewart, 1949–1953
11. John Rigsby White, 1953–1960
12. William Osborn Twaits, 1960–1970
13. John Archibald Armstrong, 1970–1974
14. Richard Gavin Reid Jr., 22 April 1974 – 21 July 1975
15. John Archibald Armstrong, 21 July 1975 – 1979
16. James George Livingstone, 1979 – 31 September 1982
17. Arden Ramon Haynes, 1 October 1982– 21 April 1988
18. Robert Byron Peterson, 21 April 1988 – 31 August 1992
19. Ronald Alvin Brenneman, 1 September 1992 – 1994
20. Robert Byron Peterson, 1994 – 31 December 2000
21. Timothy James Hearn, 1 January 2001– 31 December 2007
22. Bruce Harold March, 1 January 2008 – 28 February 2013
23. Richard Michael Kruger, 1 March 2013 – 17 September 2019
24. Bradley William Corson, 17 September 2019 – 31 March 2025
25. John Ronald Whelan, 1 April 2025 – present

=== Chairman of the Board ===
1. Frederick Ardiel Fitzgerald, 1889–1905
2. Gilead Harrison Smith, 1944–1945
3. Richard Vryling LeSueur, 1945
4. Frank Willis Pierce, 1945–1947
5. George Lawrence Stewart, 1947–1949
6. Henry Hugo Hewetson, 1949–1950
7. George Lawrence Stewart, 1953–1955
8. John Rigsby White, 1960
9. William Osborn Twaits, 1970 – 22 April 1974
10. John Archibald Armstrong, 22 April 1974 – 30 June 1981
11. Donald Kenneth McIvor, 1 July 1981 – 23 April 1985
12. Arden Ramon Haynes, 23 April 1985 – 31 August 1992
13. Robert Byron Peterson, 1 September 1992 – 23 April 2002
14. Timothy James Hearn, 23 April 2002– 31 March 2008
15. Bruce Harold March, 1 April 2008 – 28 February 2013
16. Richard Michael Kruger, 1 March 2013 – 31 December 2019
17. Bradley William Corson, 1 January 2020 – 8 May 2025
18. John Ronald Whelan, 8 May 2025 – present

== Retail ==
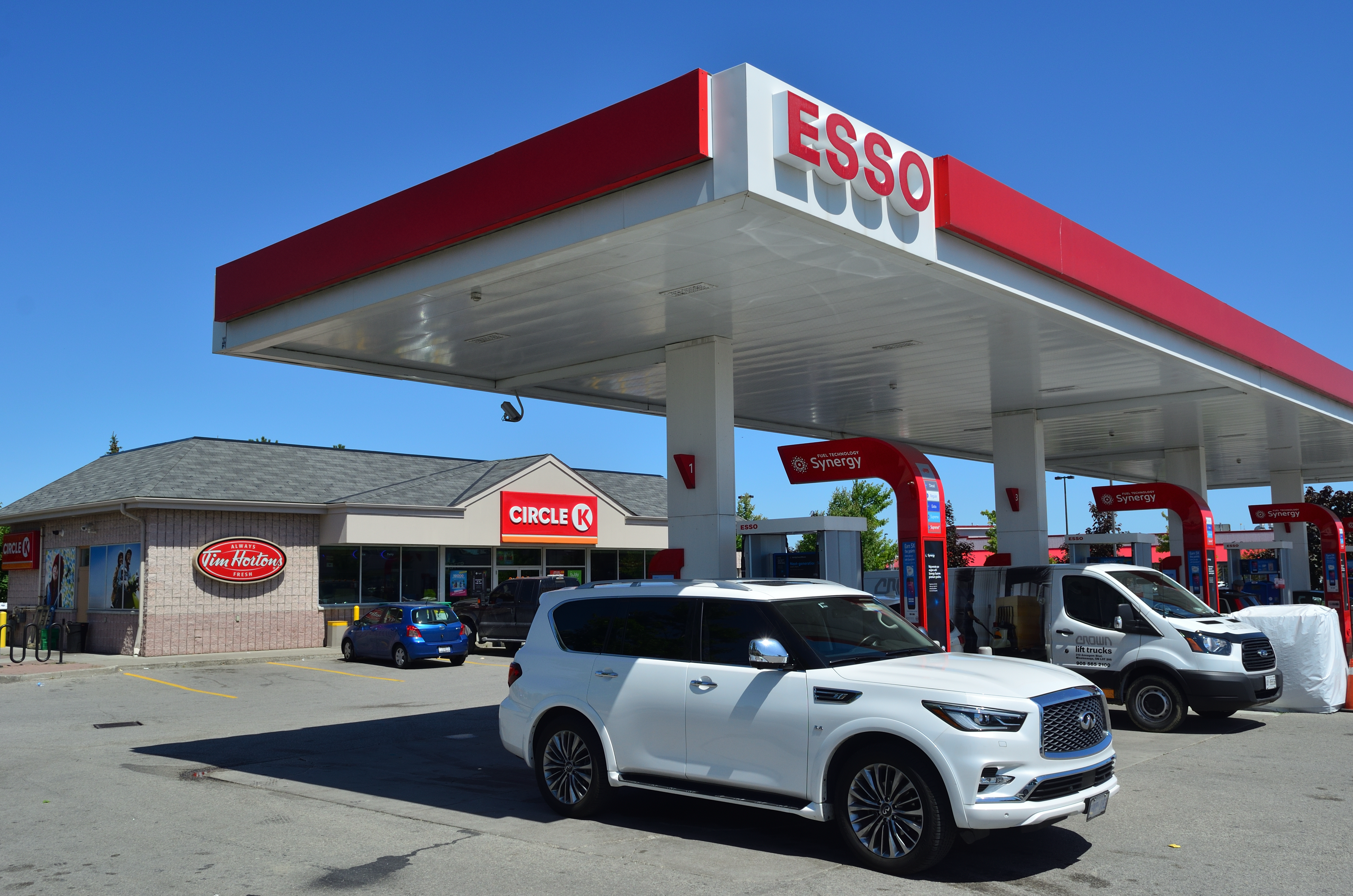
An Esso-branded service station, with Circle K convenience store, in Markham, Ontario.

With ExxonMobil having majority ownership, Imperial Oil licences its parent company's brands, including the Esso and Mobil names for service stations, and the Speedpass electronic payment system.

In 2016, Imperial sold its 497 remaining corporately-owned stations (out of approximately 1,700 nationwide) to five retailers — Alimentation Couche-Tard (mostly Ontario and Quebec), 7-Eleven (mostly Alberta and British Columbia), Parkland, Harnois (Quebec) and Wilson Fuel (Atlantic Canada), in deals totaling $2.8 billion.

In 2015, Husky Energy entered into an agreement with Imperial to integrate its commercial cardlock network with Esso; as part of the agreement, Husky converted selected retail locations—particularly its travel centres—to Esso stations.

Until 2018, Imperial Oil was a member of the rewards program Aeroplan. On March 13, 2018, Loblaw Companies announced that it had reached a deal for the Esso-branded stations to join the PC Optimum rewards program, beginning on June 1, 2018. Loblaw Companies had sold its network of 213 gas stations (all of which are attached to its various grocery store locations) to Brookfield Business Partners in 2017; Brookfield entered into an agreement with Imperial Oil to use the Mobil brand for these stations. As part of the sale agreement, these stations also continue to participate in PC Optimum.

== Controversies ==
=== Calgary layoffs and restructuring ===
In September 2025, Imperial Oil Ltd. announced a major restructuring plan that included laying off approximately 900 employees—representing 20 per cent of its workforce—most of them based in Calgary. The company, majority-owned by ExxonMobil, also revealed plans to sell its 800,000-square-foot Calgary campus in Quarry Park, citing reduced office space needs and a shift in operational strategy.

The layoffs drew criticism from Alberta Premier Danielle Smith, who blamed federal policies for weakening the oil and gas sector, while others pointed to global market trends and internal corporate decisions.

The restructuring was framed by Imperial's leadership as part of a long-term strategy to adapt to evolving business environments and technological change. However, critics questioned the timing and transparency of the decision, especially given the company's historical ties to Calgary and its symbolic presence in the city's energy sector.

== See also ==
- Dartmouth Refinery
- Nanticoke Refinery
- Strathcona Refinery
- Imperial Oil Building (former Toronto headquarters building)
- Nuns' Island gas station, an Esso station designed by Ludwig Mies van der Rohe in 1969
- Ioco, Port Moody
