= Terry Township, Ontario =

Coordinates: 48°13′59″N 80°28′05″W

Terry Township is an unincorporated geographic township in the Unorganized West part of Timiskaming District in Northeastern Ontario, Canada. The township lies on the northern edge of Timaskaming District on the border with Cochrane District.

Fallduck Lakes, the source of the Englehart River, is located in the township.
