= Arden Haynes =

Canadian businessman

- Born: 7 August 1927; Regina, Saskatchewan, Canada
- Died: 23 March 2017 (aged 89); Stony Lake, Ontario, Canada
- Education: University of Manitoba (BCom '51)
- Spouse: Helen Beverly Henderson (m. 1952; died 2015)

Arden Ramon Haynes OC (7 August 1927 – 23 March 2017) was a Canadian businessman and the ninth Chancellor of York University (1994 to 1998).

Born in Saskatchewan, he attended the University of Manitoba, where he was admitted to the Zeta Psi fraternity, graduating with a Bachelor of Commerce in 1951.

Early in his career at Imperial Oil, he had a desk in a hallway under an EXIT sign. He said the sign stood for Executive In Training.

He was the Chair and Chief Executive Officer of Imperial Oil Limited.

In 1988, he was made an Officer of the Order of Canada. He received honorary degrees from Acadia University and York University.

Academic offices
| Preceded by Oscar Peterson | Chancellor of York University; 1994–1998 | Succeeded by Avie Bennett |
