= Englehart River =

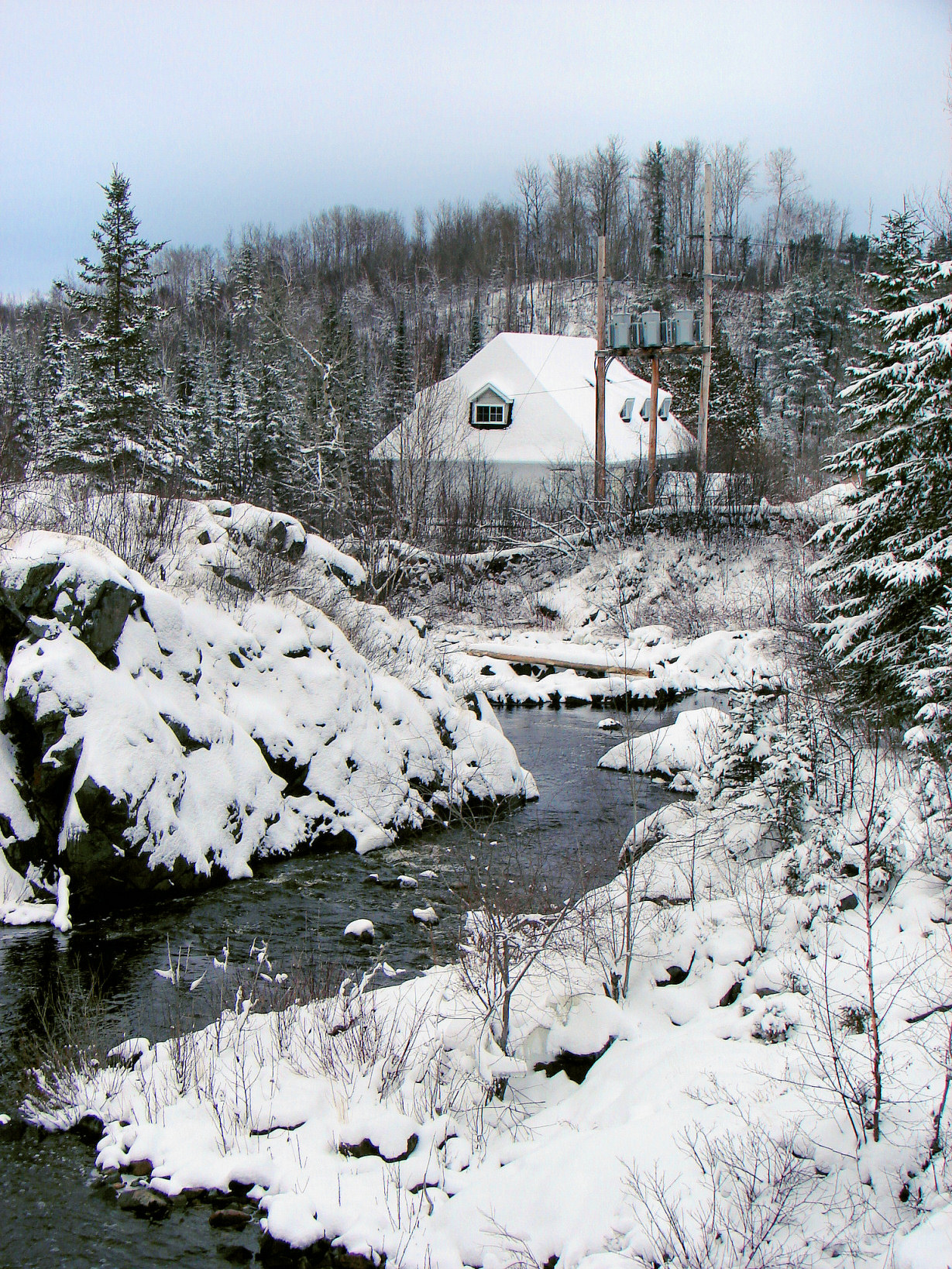
- Englehart River at Charlton in winter

- Location of the mouth of the Englehart River in Ontario

Location
- Country: Canada
- Province: Ontario
- Region: Northeastern Ontario
- District: Timiskaming

Physical characteristics
- Source: Fallduck Lakes
  - location: Terry Township
  - coordinates: 48°11′39″N 80°27′03″W
  - elevation: 324 m (1,063 ft)
- Mouth: Blanche River
  - location: Marter Township
  - coordinates: 47°50′48″N 79°50′22″W
  - elevation: 180 m (590 ft)
- Length: 105 km (65 mi)
- Basin size: 1,110 km^{2} (430 sq mi)
- Discharge
  - location: Englehart River near Englehart (WSC - 02JC001)
  - average: 17.83 m^{3}/s (630 cu ft/s)

Basin features
- River system: Saint Lawrence River drainage basin

The Englehart River is a river in Timiskaming District in northeastern Ontario, Canada. It is in the Saint Lawrence River drainage basin and is a right tributary of the Blanche River.

Its watershed is about 1,110 square kilometres (430 sq mi) in size and the river is about 105 kilometres (65 mi) long.

== Geography ==
The Englehart River begins at Fallduck Lakes in Terry Township. It flows southeast, and after passing under Highway 66, it flow through a swampy river corridor with several oxbow lakes and backwater sloughs. The silty clay river banks have shrub thickets with some black ash and balsam poplar. The higher banks support stands of old growth white cedar and white spruce.

The river enters Long Lake in the northwest and exits the lake in the southeast, heading east, passing over one of two dams and under Ontario Highway 573 at the community of Charlton (in the municipality of Charlton and Dack), then heads under Ontario Highway 560. The river passes over a series of waterfalls and rapids (Sunday Creek Falls, Horseshoe Falls, Hell's Gate, High Falls, and Nuisance Rapids), turns north, flows under Ontario Highway 11 and the Ontario Northland Railway mainline at the town of Englehart, then reaches its mouth at the Blanche River at Marter Township. The Blanche River flows via the Ottawa River to the Saint Lawrence River.

=== Tributaries ===
- Crocodile Creek (left)
- St. Jean Baptiste Creek (right)
- Sunday Creek (right)
- Long Lake
  - Tamarac Creek (right)
  - Aidie Creek (left)
  - Driftwood Creek (right)
- Teepee Creek (right)
- Flavelle Creek (right)
- Middleton Creek (right)
- Burt Creek (left)
- Kenaja Creek (right)
- Rib Creek (left)

== Provincial parks ==
Englehart River Fine Sand Plain and Waterway Provincial Park
- IUCN category II (national park)
- Interactive map of Englehart River Fine Sand Plain and Waterway Provincial Park
- Coordinates: 47°52′42″N 80°12′32″W
- Area: 4,041.00 ha (15.6024 sq mi)
- Designation: Waterway
- Established: 2002
- Governing body: Ontario Parks
- Website: www.ontarioparks.com/park/englehartriverfinesandplainandwaterway

The Englehart River Fine Sand Plain and Waterway Provincial Park protects a (nearly) contiguous portions of the Englehart River between Highway 66 and the northwestern part of Long Lake, as well as noncontiguous sections on the southeastern portion of Long Lake. The park, created to protect a recreational canoe route, is 48 kilometres (30 mi) southwest of the Town of Kirkland Lake and 20 kilometres (12 mi) west of the Town of Englehart.

The park includes, as its name indicates, an area with fine sandy ground moraine till on the west side of the Englehart River. Other notable features are two Areas of Natural and Scientific Interest (ANSI):

1. The Teepee Creek Gap ANSI has a small 20-metre-deep (66 ft) gorge through which the Teepee Creek flows before draining into Englehart River. Its vegetation is characterized by a mix of coniferous and intolerant hardwood species.
2. The Kushog Lake Dune Complex ANSI contains several linear dune ridges that are remants of postglacial conditions in the glacial Lake Barlow basin area. The dominant tree species there are poplar, jack pine, black spruce, and larch.

The Englehart River Fine Sand Plain and Waterway Provincial Park is a non-operating park. There are no facilities or services provided. Permitted activities include canoeing and hunting. The canoe route is recommended for intermediate to advanced-level paddlers.

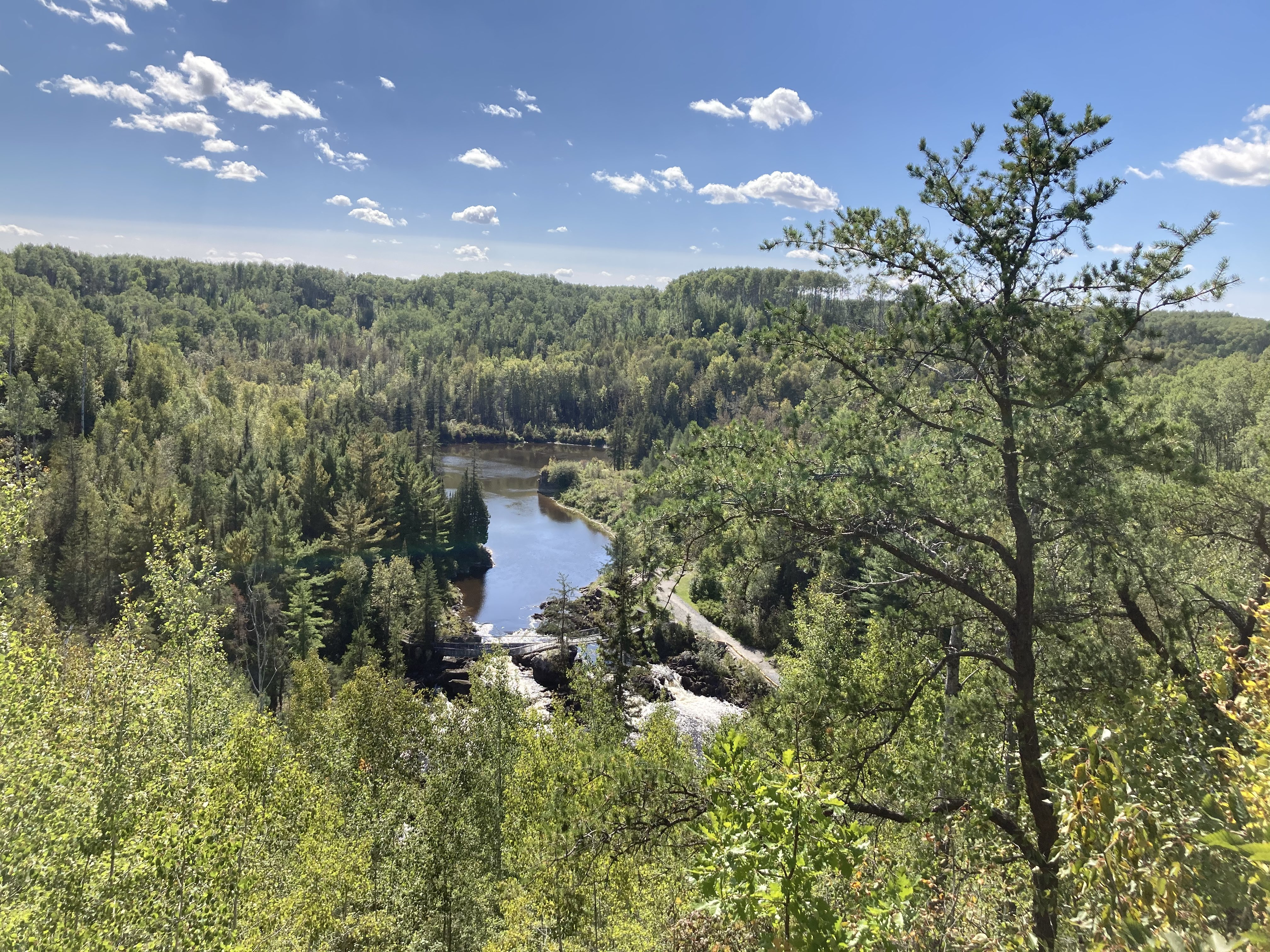
Englehart River at Kap-Kig-Iwan Park

Another small portion of the Englehart River is protected in the Kap-Kig-Iwan Provincial Park, located on the river between the communities of Charlton and Englehart.

== Geology ==
The river's course through Englehart River Fine Sand Plain and Waterway Provincial Park is in the Cross Lake Fault, the northeast facing escarpment of which is the southwest boundary of the Lake Timiskaming Rift Valley.

== See also ==
- List of rivers of Ontario
