= William Twaits (businessman) =

Canadian businessman (1910–1985)

William Osborn Twaits
- Born: 12 June 1910; Galt, Ontario
- Died: 3 April 1985 (aged 74); Dallas, Texas
- Education: University of Toronto (BComm '33)
- Spouse: Frances Helen Begg (m. 1937)

William Osborn Twaits CC (12 June 1910 – 3 April 1985) was a Canadian businessman who was chairman and chief executive officer of Imperial Oil Limited.

Born in Galt, Ontario, the son of William and Laura Josephine (Osborn), Twaits received his B.Comm. from the University of Toronto in 1933.

In 1950, Twaits joined the board of directors of Imperial Oil. He was appointed a vice president in 1952, executive vice-president in 1955, and president in 1960. In 1970 he became chairman of the board and chief executive officer. He retired in 1974. He was a director and a vice-president of the Royal Bank of Canada.

Twaits was a member of the board of governors of the University of Toronto and of the board of regents of the University of Ottawa.

In 1973, Twaits was made a Companion of the Order of Canada "for his many services to industry and government, and in the field of social welfare".

Twaits received honorary doctorates from Acadia University and the University of Ottawa.

Twaits married Frances Begg and had two daughters.
