= Misema =

Misema may refer to:

== Places ==
- Misema Lake, in northeastern Ontario, Canada
- Misema River, in northeastern Ontario, Canada
- Little Misema River, in northeastern Ontario, Canada

== Other uses ==
- Acrolophus misema, a moth of the family Acrolophidae
- Misema Caldera, a 2,704-2,707 million year old caldera in Ontario and Quebec, Canada
