= Arnold Township =

Arnold Township may refer to:

- Arnold Township, Custer County, Nebraska
- Arnold Township, Ontario
