= Arnold Township, Ontario =

Coordinates: 48°14′02″N 79°49′13″W

Arnold Township is an unincorporated geographic township in the Unorganized East part of Timiskaming District in Northeastern Ontario, Canada.

Misema Lake, on the Misema River, is partly in the township. The northern border of the township is the border with Cochrane District.
