= Noranda =

Noranda may refer to:

- Noranda (mining company)
- Noranda Caldera, an Archean caldera in Canada
- Noranda, Western Australia, a suburb of Perth
- Noranda, Quebec, a former city in Canada: see Rouyn-Noranda
