= Ben Nevis Township =

Coordinates: 48°19′14″N 79°41′44″W

Ben Nevis Township is an unincorporated geographic township in the Unorganized North part of Cochrane District in Northeastern Ontario, Canada. The township is named for Ben Nevis, the highest mountain in the British Isles.

Sullivan Lake and Little Misema Lake, the sources of the Misema River and Little Misema River respectively, are located in the township, as is Pushkin Lake, further along the Misema River. Also located in the township are the Pushkin Hills, part of the Blake River Megacaldera Complex. The southern border of the township forms part of the border between Cochrane District and Timiskaming District.
