= New Senator Caldera =

Archean era caldera complex in Quebec, Canada

- Calderas
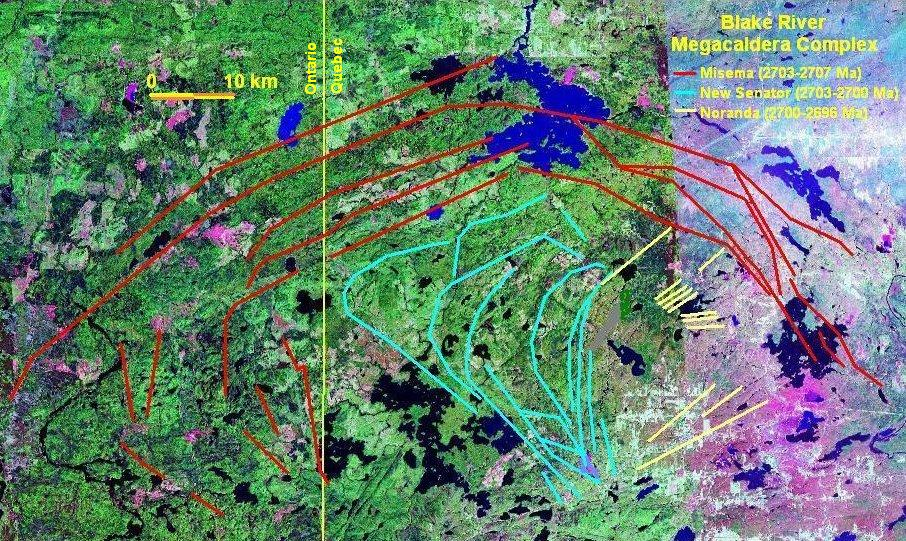
- New Senator Caldera is highlighted cyan
- Location: Ontario-Quebec, Canada
- Range: Canadian Shield

The New Senator Caldera is a large Archean caldera complex within the heart of the Blake River Megacaldera Complex, Quebec, Canada. It has a diameter of 15-30 kilometers and is made of thick massive mafic sequences. The caldera complex has inferred to be a subaqueous lava lake during the early stages of the caldera's development. Gabbro sills represent lava lakes, which are common in mafic summit calderas. These subaqueous lava lakes are large units with a change in grain size from coarse to fine grained and a hyaloclastite top. The Kiwanis (Norands) intrusion, a high-level synvolcanic magma chamber, intrudes felsic rocks, and is in turn cross-cut by basaltic dikes and sills.

The Glenwood fault forms the eastern margin of the New Senator Caldera.

== See also ==
- Noranda Caldera
- Misema Caldera
- Volcanism of Canada
- Volcanism of Eastern Canada
- List of volcanoes in Canada
