= Little Misema Lake =

Lake in Ontario, Canada

- Location in Ontario
- Location: Cochrane District, Ontario
- Coordinates: 48°17′29″N 79°38′45″W
- Primary outflows: Little Misema River
- Basin countries: Canada
- Max. length: 1,070 metres (3,510 ft)
- Max. width: 440 metres (1,440 ft)
- Surface elevation: 333 metres (1,093 ft)

Little Misema Lake is a lake in geographic Ben Nevis Township, Cochrane District in Northeastern Ontario, Canada. It is in the Saint Lawrence River drainage basin and is the source of the Little Misema River. The lake is also located in the Pushkin Hills, part of the Blake River Megacaldera Complex.

== See also ==
- List of lakes in Ontario
