= Sullivan Lake (Cochrane District) =

Lake in Cochrane District, Ontario, Canada

- Location in Ontario
- Location: Cochrane District and Timiskaming District, Ontario
- Coordinates: 48°16′39″N 79°42′22″W
- Part of: Saint Lawrence River drainage basin
- Primary outflows: Misema River
- Basin countries: Canada
- Max. length: 1,008 metres (3,310 ft)
- Max. width: 230 metres (750 ft)
- Surface elevation: 375 metres (1,230 ft)

Sullivan Lake is a lake in geographic Ben Nevis Township, Cochrane District, with a small tip in geographic Katrine Township, Timiskaming District, in Northeastern Ontario, Canada. It is in the Saint Lawrence River drainage basin and is the source of the Misema River. The lake is also located in the Pushkin Hills, part of the Blake River Megacaldera Complex.

== See also ==
- List of lakes in Ontario
