= Kazan Region =

Physiographic province in central Canada

Coordinates: 59.903°N 101.803°W

The Kazan Region is a physiographic province of Canada and the part of the Canadian Shield that is located in extreme north-eastern Alberta, northern Manitoba, and Saskatchewan, and also in parts of the Northwest Territories and Nunavut.

== Geography ==
The Kazan Region is subdivided into the following subregions: the Coronation Hills, the Bathurst Hills and the East Arm Hills; the Boothia Plateau; the Wager Plateau; the Kazan Upland; the Bear-Slave Upland; the Athabasca Plain, the Thelon Plain; and the Back Lowland.

== Geology ==
The base rocks in the Kazan Region are Precambrian crystalline rocks such as gneisses, quartzites and granites. In the eastern part of the Kazan Region these are the predominant rocks. In the western portion the Precambrian rocks are overlain by Paleozoic and Cretaceous sediments, many of which have been metamorphosed. In both east and west these rocks are in turn overlain in places by alluvial and lacustrian deposits, as well as glacial deposits.
