= Katrine Township, Ontario =

Katrine Township
- Geographic township
- Location in Ontario
- Coordinates: 48°14′14″N 79°41′40″W
- Country: Canada
- Province: Ontario
- Region: Northeastern Ontario
- District: Timiskaming
- Part: Unorganized East
- Time zone: UTC-5 (Eastern Time Zone)
  - Summer (DST): UTC-4 (Eastern Time Zone)

Katrine Township is an unincorporated geographic township in the Unorganized East part of Timiskaming District in Northeastern Ontario, Canada.

A small part of Sullivan Lake, the source of the Misema River, is in the township. Misema Lake, further downstream on the Misema River, is partly in the township and is the location of the mouth of the Little Misema River. The northern border of the township forms part of the border between Timiskaming District and Cochrane District.
