= Guaichane-Mamuta =

Volcano in Chile

Guaichane-Mamuta is a volcano in Chile. It is formed by a caldera and lava flows which form two separate systems. The volcano is of Miocene age.

Guaichane-Mamuta lies 150 kilometres (93 mi) northeast of Pisagua. One half is formed by the 6 kilometres (3.7 mi) wide and 700–800 metres (2,300–2,600 ft) deep erosion caldera of Mamuta, which rises to an altitude of 4,500 metres (14,800 ft). The other half, southeast of Mamuta, is the Guaichane half and is constructed by four different units of andesite-basaltic andesite lava flows; these include Cerro Churicoyo (4,503 metres (14,774 ft)), Cerro Colorado (4,421 metres (14,505 ft)), Cerro Guaichane (4,684 metres (15,367 ft)) and Cerro Limpire.(4,280 metres (14,040 ft))

Guaichane-Mamuta is constructed on the mid-Miocene Altos de Nama formation, which is formed by ignimbrites. Mamuta itself was also the origin of ignimbrites. Older pyroclastics from the same centre contain phenocrysts of clinopyroxene, olivine, orthopyroxene and plagioclase.

Mamuta is a volcano among a group of Miocene age stratovolcanoes on the western slope of the Andes. These are usually only partially eroded, although preferential erosion of the volcanos' central parts can cause the appearance of erosion calderas.

Three ages have been obtained on Mamuta, 8.8±0.5, 9.1±0.6 and 14.5 million years ago. The younger ages are considered more reliable. The older date was obtained on the Mamuta caldera. Ages obtained on Guaichane are 11.3±0.5 and 10.2±0.8 million years ago.
