= Misema Lake =

Lake in Timiskaming District, Ontario, Canada

- Location in Ontario
- Location: Timiskaming District, Ontario
- Coordinates: 48°12′56″N 79°45′06″W
- Primary inflows: Misema River, Little Misema River, Kinabik Creek
- Primary outflows: Misema River
- Basin countries: Canada
- Max. length: 7.4 kilometres (4.6 mi)
- Max. width: 4.5 kilometres (2.8 mi)
- Surface elevation: 285 metres (935 ft)

Misema Lake is a lake in geographic Katrine and geographic Arnold Township, Timiskaming District in Northeastern Ontario, Canada. It is in the Saint Lawrence River drainage basin and is in the Misema Caldera.

The primary inflows are the Misema River at the west and the Little Misema River at the northeast. A secondary inflow is Kinabik Creek at the east. The primary outflow is the Misema River at the south, which flows via the Blanche River and Ottawa River to the Saint Lawrence River.

== See also ==
- List of lakes in Ontario
