= Little Misema River =

- Location of the mouth of the Little Misema River in Ontario

Location
- Country: Canada
- Province: Ontario
- Region: Northeastern Ontario
- Districts: Timiskaming; Cochrane

Physical characteristics
- Source: Little Misema Lake
  - location: Ben Nevis Township, Cochrane District
  - coordinates: 48°17′31″N 79°38′16″W
  - elevation: 333 m (1,093 ft)
- Mouth: Misema Lake on the Misema River
  - location: Katrine Township, Timiskaming District
  - coordinates: 48°13′28″N 79°44′19″W
  - elevation: 285 m (935 ft)
- Length: 15.1 km (9.4 mi)

Basin features
- River system: Saint Lawrence River drainage basin

The Little Misema River is a river in Timiskaming District and Cochrane District in Northeastern Ontario, Canada. It is in the Saint Lawrence River drainage basin and is a left tributary of the Misema River.

== Course ==
The river begins at the mouth of Little Misema Lake (length: 1.0 kilometre (0.62 mi); altitude: 333 metres (1,093 ft)) in geographic Ben Nevis Township in Cochrane District. Little Misema Lake is also in the Pushkin Hills, part of the Blake River Megacaldera Complex. The river exits the lake at the east, travels southwest into Timiskaming District, and reaches its mouth at Misema Lake on the Misema River in Katrine Township. The Misema River flows via the Blanche River and Ottawa River to the Saint Lawrence River.

== See also ==
- Misema River
- List of rivers of Ontario

== Sources ==
- Map 15 (PDF) (Map). 1 : 1,600,000. Official road map of Ontario. Ministry of Transportation of Ontario. 2014.
- Restructured municipalities - Ontario map #3 (Map). Restructuring Maps of Ontario. Ontario Ministry of Municipal Affairs and Housing. 2006.
