= Noranda Caldera =

Archean era caldera complex in Quebec, Canada

Coordinates: 48°14′N 79°20′W

- Calderas
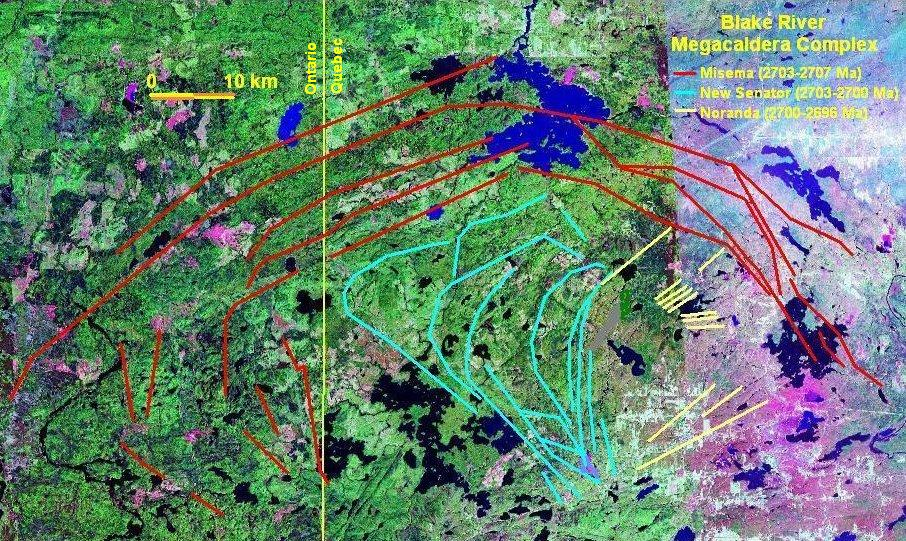
- Noranda Caldera is highlighted pale yellow
- Interactive map of Noranda Caldera
- Location: Quebec, Canada
- Range: Canadian Shield

The Noranda Caldera is a well-known large subaqueous Archean caldera complex not too far from Rouyn-Noranda, Quebec within the Blake River Megacaldera Complex. The caldera contains a 7-to-9-km-thick succession of bimodal mafic-felsic tholeiitic to calc-alkaline volcanic rocks which were erupted during five major series of volcanic activity.

The metallogenic impact of the Noranda Caldera is well-known, but the importance of the New Senator Caldera and Misema Caldera remains to be evaluated.

== See also ==
- Volcanism of Eastern Canada
- List of volcanoes in Canada
