= Misema Caldera =

2.7 billion year old caldera in Ontario and Quebec, Canada

Coordinates: 48.39°N 79.45°W

- Calderas
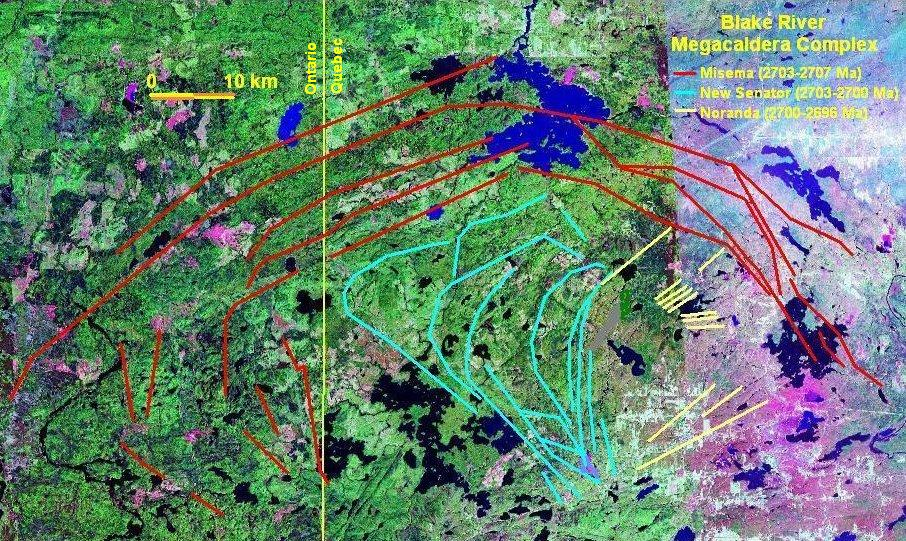
- Map of the Blake River Megacaldera Complex. Misema Caldera is highlighted in red.
- Interactive map of Misema Caldera
- Location: Ontario-Quebec, Canada
- Range: Canadian Shield
- Age: 2,704-2,707 MYA

The Misema Caldera is a 2,704-2,707 million year old caldera in Ontario and Quebec, Canada.

== Geographic extent ==
It is the caldera that forms the Blake River Megacaldera Complex and has a diameter of 40-80 kilometres.

== Composition ==
The caldera is also a coalescence of at least two large mafic shield volcanoes that formed more than 2703 million years ago. The rim of the Misema Caldera contains a 10-15 kilometre wide inner and outer ring zone, in which many mafic ring dike complexes and subaqueous pyroclastic sediments are detected.

The mafic ring dike structures may be deeper level expressions of summit calderas related to a shield volcano phase while the pyroclastic fragments could either be associated with satellite cones or the result of Misema caldera collapse.

Misema Caldera is the oldest and largest caldera associated with the Blake River Megacaldera Complex and is comparable in size to Lake Toba caldera in Indonesia.

== See also ==
- New Senator Caldera
- Noranda Caldera
- List of volcanoes in Canada
- Volcanism of Canada
- Volcanism of Eastern Canada
