= Misema River =

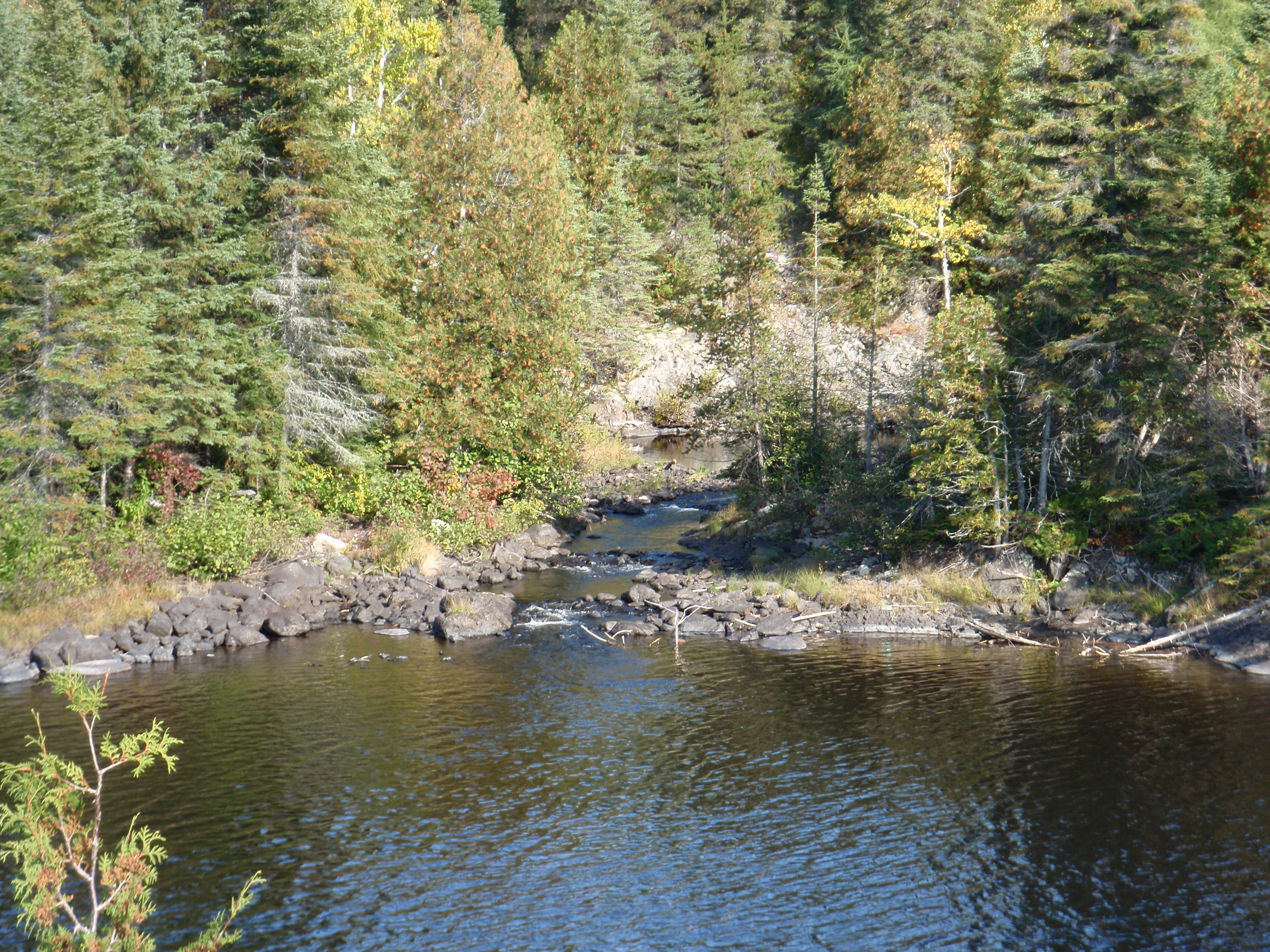
- Banks of the Misema

- Location of the mouth of the Misema River in Ontario

Location
- Country: Canada
- Province: Ontario
- Region: Northeastern Ontario
- Districts: Timiskaming; Cochrane

Physical characteristics
- Source: Sullivan Lake
  - location: Ben Nevis Township, Cochrane District
  - coordinates: 48°16′50″N 79°42′03″W
  - elevation: 375 m (1,230 ft)
- Mouth: Blanche River
  - location: Marter Township, Timiskaming District
  - coordinates: 47°54′03″N 79°52′38″W
  - elevation: 183 m (600 ft)

Basin features
- River system: Saint Lawrence River drainage basin
- Tributaries
  - left: Little Misema River

The Misema River is a river in Timiskaming District and Cochrane District in Northeastern Ontario, Canada. It is in the Saint Lawrence River drainage basin and is a left tributary of the Blanche River.

== Course ==
The river begins at Sullivan Lake in geographic Ben Nevis Township, Cochrane District. It exits the lake at the northeast and travels counterclockwise around the Pushkin Hills, part of the Blake River Megacaldera Complex, eventually heading south into Timiskaming District and Misema Lake, where it takes in the left tributary Little Misema River in geographic Katrine Township. It heads south, passes under the former Ontario Northland Railway's Nipissing Central Railway branchline and Ontario Highway 66, flows west through South Grassy Lake, the south and west again over the Eighty Foot Falls, site of Canadian Hydro Developers' Misema Dam and 3.2 MW hydroelectric powerplant, and reaches its mouth at the Blanche River in Marter Township on the border with Chamberlain to the west. The Blanche River flows via the Ottawa River to the Saint Lawrence River.

== Tributaries ==
- Spring Creek (left)
- McElroy Creek (right)
- Estrangement Creek (left)
- Victoria Creek (right)
- Kinabik Creek (left)
- Little Misema River (left)

== See also ==
- List of rivers of Ontario

== Sources ==
- Map 15 (PDF) (Map). 1 : 1,600,000. Official road map of Ontario. Ministry of Transportation of Ontario. 2014.
- Restructured municipalities - Ontario map #3 (Map). Restructuring Maps of Ontario. Ontario Ministry of Municipal Affairs and Housing. 2006.
