= Unorganized East Timiskaming District =

- Unorganized area
- Timiskaming, Unorganized, East Part
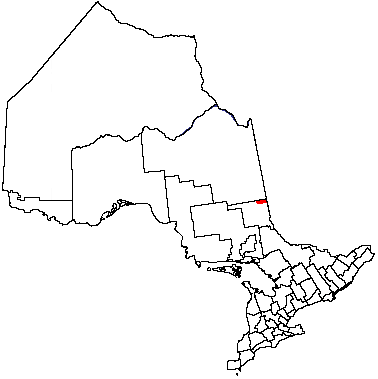
- Coordinates: 48°14′N 79°42′W
- Country: Canada
- Province: Ontario
- District: Timiskaming

Government
  - Fed. riding: Kapuskasing—Timmins—Mushkegowuk
  - Prov. riding: Timiskaming—Cochrane

Area
  - Land: 248.55 km^{2} (95.97 sq mi)

Population (2021)
  - Total: 5
  - Density: 0/km^{2} (0/sq mi)
- Time zone: UTC-5 (EST)
  - Summer (DST): UTC-4 (EDT)
- Area code: 705

Unorganized East Timiskaming District is an unorganized area in the Canadian province of Ontario, comprising the unincorporated portions of the Timiskaming District lying east of the municipal boundaries of Kirkland Lake and north of the municipal boundaries of Gauthier, Larder Lake and McGarry.

The division does not encompass any named communities, comprising only a small number of residential and recreational properties in the geographic townships of Arnold, Katrine and Ossian.

The division encompasses 248.55 square kilometres (95.97 sq mi), and had a population of 5 in the 2021 Canadian census.

== Demographics ==
Canada census – Timiskaming, Unorganized, East Part community profile

	2021	2016
Population	5 (0.0% from 2016)	5 (% from 2011)
Land area	248.55 km^{2} (95.97 sq mi)	249.63 km^{2} (96.38 sq mi)
Population density	0.0/km^{2} (0/sq mi)	0.0/km^{2} (0/sq mi)
Median age
Private dwellings	38 (total) 4 (occupied)	100 (total) 3 (occupied)
Median household income	$ n/a	$ n/a

Notes: Age and income data suppressed.
References: 2021 2016

Historical census populations – Timiskaming, Unorganized, East Part

Year	Pop.	±%
1976	0	—
1981	20	—
1986	24	+20.0%
1991	12	−50.0%
1996	0	−100.0%

Year	Pop.	±%
2001	0	0.00%
2006	10	—
2011	0	−100.0%
2016	5	—
2021	5	+0.0%

Source: Statistics Canada

== See also ==
- List of townships in Ontario
