= Sturgeon Lake Caldera =

Extinct caldera complex in Kenora District of Northwestern Ontario, Canada

Highest point
- Elevation: approx. 455 m (1,493 ft)
- Listing: List of volcanoes in Canada
- Coordinates: 49°52′13″N 91°00′10″W

Geography
- Location: Ontario, Canada

Geology
- Rock age: Neoarchean
- Mountain type: Caldera
- Volcanic belt: Sturgeon Lake greenstone belt
- Last eruption: Neoarchean

Sturgeon Lake Caldera is a large extinct caldera complex in Kenora District of Northwestern Ontario, Canada. It is one of the world's best preserved mineralized Neoarchean caldera complexes, containing well-preserved mafic-intermediate pillow lavas, pillow breccias, hyaloclastite and peperites, submarine lava domes and dome-associated breccia deposits. The complex is some 2.7 billion years old with a minimum strike length of 30 km (19 mi).

== Geology ==
The Sturgeon Lake Caldera contains a well preserved north facing homoclinal chain of greenschist facies metamorphosed intrusive, volcanic, and sedimentary layers. This piecemeal caldera complex includes nearly 3,000 m (9,843 ft) of major subaqueously deposited intracaldera fill. Episodes of subaerial and subaqueous explosive felsic volcanism created rhyodacitic to rhyolitic tuffs and lapilli tuffs. The caldera complex lies in the Sturgeon Lake greenstone belt.

The Sturgeon Lake Caldera contains volcanic units that outcrop over 30 km (19 mi) from east to west with up to five separate, major ash flow tuff units with thickness ranging from 100 m (328 ft) to 1,200 m (3,937 ft). The Mattabi pyroclastic flow, with a thickness in excess of 800 m (2,625 ft) and a strike length of at least 30 km (19 mi), is the third and most voluminous eruptive event associated with the Sturgeon Lake Caldera. It hosts the 12-Mt Mattabi massive sulfide deposit which is interpreted to have formed on and below the seafloor, the latter through the processes of pore-space filling and replacement.

== See also ==
- Volcanism of Canada
- Volcanism of Eastern Canada
- List of volcanoes in Canada
