= Caldera =

Cauldron-like volcanic feature formed by the emptying of a magma chamber

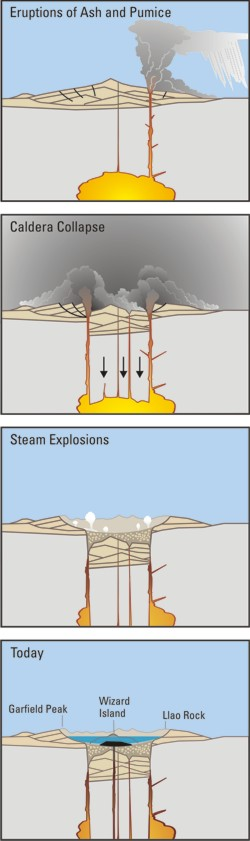
Mount Mazama's eruption timeline, an example of caldera formation

A caldera (/kɔːlˈdɛrə, kæl-/ kawl-DERR-ə, kal-) is a large cauldron-like hollow that forms shortly after the emptying of a magma chamber in a volcanic eruption. The ejection of large volumes of magma in a short time can upset the integrity of a magma chamber's structure by in effect removing much of the chamber's filling material. The walls and ceiling of a chamber may then not be able to support its own weight and any substrate or rock resting above. The ground surface then collapses into the emptied or partially emptied magma chamber, leaving a large depression at the surface that may have a diameter of dozens of kilometers. Although sometimes described as a crater, the feature is actually a type of sinkhole, as it is formed through subsidence and collapse rather than an explosion or impact. Compared to the thousands of volcanic eruptions that occur over the course of a century, the formation of a caldera is a rare event, occurring only a few times within a given window of 100 years. Only nine caldera-forming collapses are known to have occurred between 1911 and 2022, with the caldera collapses at Kīlauea, Hawaii, in 2018 and Hunga Tonga–Hunga Haʻapai in 2022 being the most recent. Volcanoes that have formed a caldera are sometimes described as "caldera volcanoes".

== Etymology ==
The term caldera comes from Spanish caldera, and Latin caldaria, meaning "cooking pot". In some texts the English term cauldron is also used, though in more recent work the term cauldron refers to a caldera that has been deeply eroded to expose the beds under the caldera floor. The term caldera was introduced into the geological vocabulary by the German geologist Leopold von Buch when he published his memoirs of his 1815 visit to the Canary Islands, (Note: Leopold von Buch's book Physical Description of the Canary Isles was published in 1825.) where he first saw the Las Cañadas caldera on Tenerife, with Mount Teide dominating the landscape, and then the Caldera de Taburiente on La Palma.

== Caldera formation ==
Animation of an analogue experiment showing the origin of a mock volcanic caldera in box filled with flour

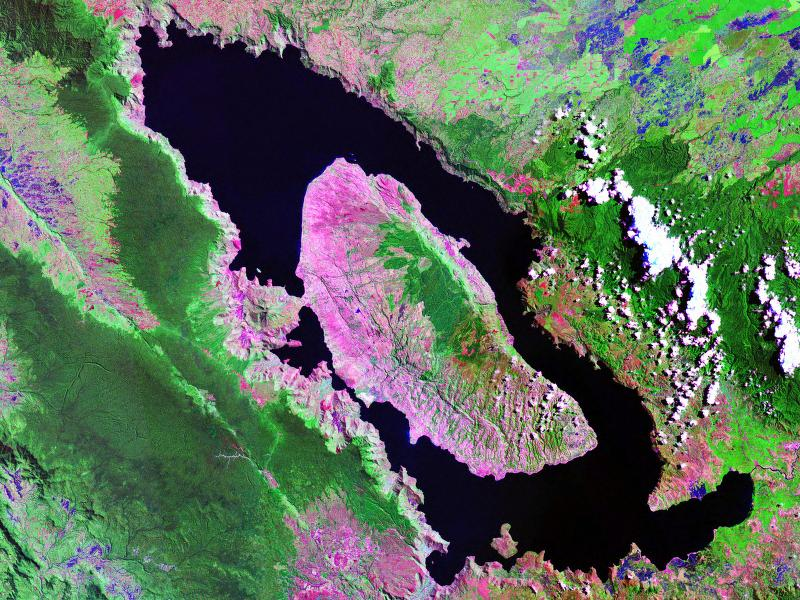
Landsat image of Lake Toba, on the island of Sumatra, Indonesia (100 km/62 mi long and 30 km/19 mi wide, one of the world's largest calderas). A resurgent dome formed the island of Samosir.

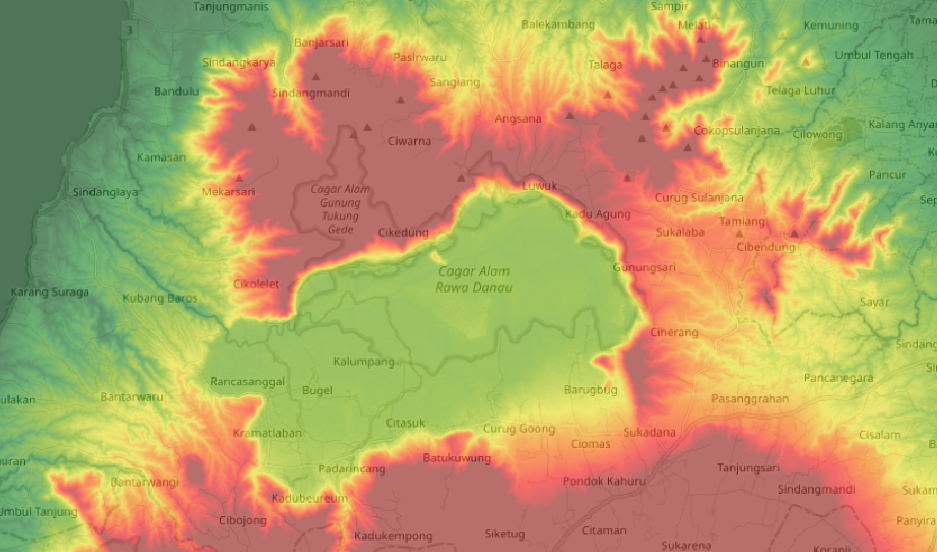
Topographic map of Cagar Alam Rawa Danau Caldera in Indonesia

A collapse is triggered by the emptying of the magma chamber beneath the volcano, sometimes as the result of a large explosive volcanic eruption (see Tambora in 1815), but also during effusive eruptions on the flanks of a volcano (see Piton de la Fournaise in 2007) or in a connected fissure system (see Bárðarbunga in 2014–2015). If enough magma is ejected, the emptied chamber is unable to support the weight of the volcanic edifice above it. A roughly circular fracture, the "ring fault", develops around the edge of the chamber. Ring fractures serve as feeders for fault intrusions, which are also known as ring dikes. Secondary volcanic vents may form above the ring fracture. As the magma chamber empties, the center of the volcano within the ring fracture begins to collapse. The collapse may occur as the result of a single cataclysmic eruption, or it may occur in stages as the result of a series of eruptions. The total area that collapses may be hundreds of square kilometers.

== Mineralization in calderas ==
Some calderas are known to host rich ore deposits. Metal-rich fluids can circulate through the caldera, forming hydrothermal ore deposits of metals such as lead, silver, gold, mercury, lithium, and uranium. One of the world's best-preserved mineralized calderas is the Sturgeon Lake Caldera in northwestern Ontario, Canada, which formed during the Neoarchean era about 2.7 billion years ago. In the San Juan volcanic field, ore veins were emplaced in fractures associated with several calderas, with the greatest mineralization taking place near the youngest and most silicic intrusions associated with each caldera.

== Types of caldera ==
=== Explosive caldera eruptions ===
Explosive caldera eruptions are produced by a magma chamber whose magma is rich in silica. Silica-rich magma has a high viscosity, and therefore does not flow easily like basalt. The magma typically also contains a large amount of dissolved gases, up to 7 wt% for the most silica-rich magmas. When the magma approaches the surface of the Earth, the drop in confining pressure causes the trapped gases to rapidly bubble out of the magma, fragmenting the magma to produce a mixture of volcanic ash and other tephra with the very hot gases.

The mixture of ash and volcanic gases initially rises into the atmosphere as an eruption column. However, as the volume of erupted material increases, the eruption column is unable to entrain enough air to remain buoyant, and the eruption column collapses into a tephra fountain that falls back to the surface to form pyroclastic flows. Eruptions of this type can spread ash over vast areas, so that ash flow tuffs emplaced by silicic caldera eruptions are the only volcanic product with volumes rivaling those of flood basalts. For example, when Yellowstone Caldera last erupted some 650,000 years ago, it released about 1,000 km^{3} of material (as measured in dense rock equivalent (DRE)), covering a substantial part of North America in up to two metres of debris.

Eruptions forming even larger calderas are known, such as the La Garita Caldera in the San Juan Mountains of Colorado, where the 5,000 cubic kilometres (1,200 cu mi) Fish Canyon Tuff was blasted out in eruptions about 27.8 million years ago.

The caldera produced by such eruptions is typically filled in with tuff, rhyolite, and other igneous rocks. The caldera is surrounded by an outflow sheet of ash flow tuff (also called an ash flow sheet).

If magma continues to be injected into the collapsed magma chamber, the center of the caldera may be uplifted in the form of a resurgent dome such as is seen at the Valles Caldera, Lake Toba, the San Juan volcanic field, Cerro Galán, Yellowstone, and many other calderas.

Because a silicic caldera may erupt hundreds or even thousands of cubic kilometers of material in a single event, it can cause catastrophic environmental effects. Even small caldera-forming eruptions, such as Krakatoa in 1883 or Mount Pinatubo in 1991, may result in significant local destruction and a noticeable drop in temperature around the world. Large calderas may have even greater effects. The ecological effects of the eruption of a large caldera can be seen in the record of the Lake Toba eruption in Indonesia.

At some points in geological time, rhyolitic calderas have appeared in distinct clusters. The remnants of such clusters may be found in places such as the Eocene Rum Complex of Scotland, the San Juan Mountains of Colorado (formed during the Oligocene, Miocene, and Pliocene epochs) or the Saint Francois Mountain Range of Missouri (erupted during the Proterozoic eon).

==== Valles ====
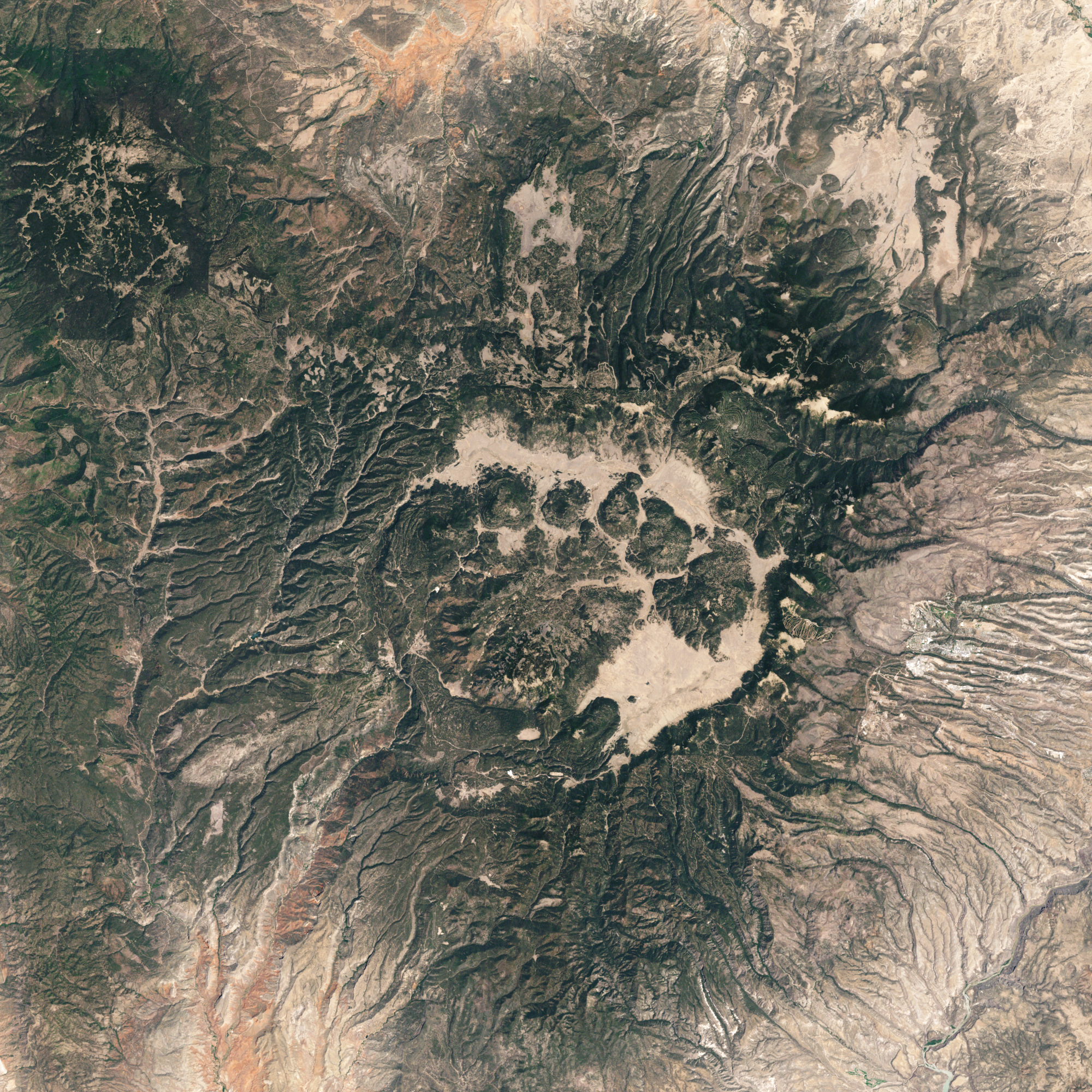
Valle Caldera, New Mexico

For their 1968 paper that first introduced the concept of a resurgent caldera to geology, R.L. Smith and R.A. Bailey chose the Valles caldera as their model. Although the Valles caldera is not unusually large, it is relatively young (1.25 million years old) and unusually well preserved, and it remains one of the best studied examples of a resurgent caldera. The ash flow tuffs of the Valles caldera, such as the Bandelier Tuff, were among the first to be thoroughly characterized.

==== Toba ====
About 74,000 years ago, this Indonesian volcano released about 2,800 cubic kilometres (670 cu mi) dense-rock equivalent of ejecta. This was the largest known eruption during the ongoing Quaternary period (the last 2.6 million years) and the largest known explosive eruption during the last 25 million years. In the late 1990s, anthropologist Stanley Ambrose proposed that a volcanic winter induced by this eruption reduced the human population to about 2,000–20,000 individuals, resulting in a population bottleneck. More recently, Lynn Jorde and Henry Harpending proposed that the human species was reduced to approximately 5,000–10,000 people. There is no direct evidence, however, that either theory is correct, and there is no evidence for any other animal decline or extinction, even in environmentally sensitive species. There is evidence that human habitation continued in India after the eruption.

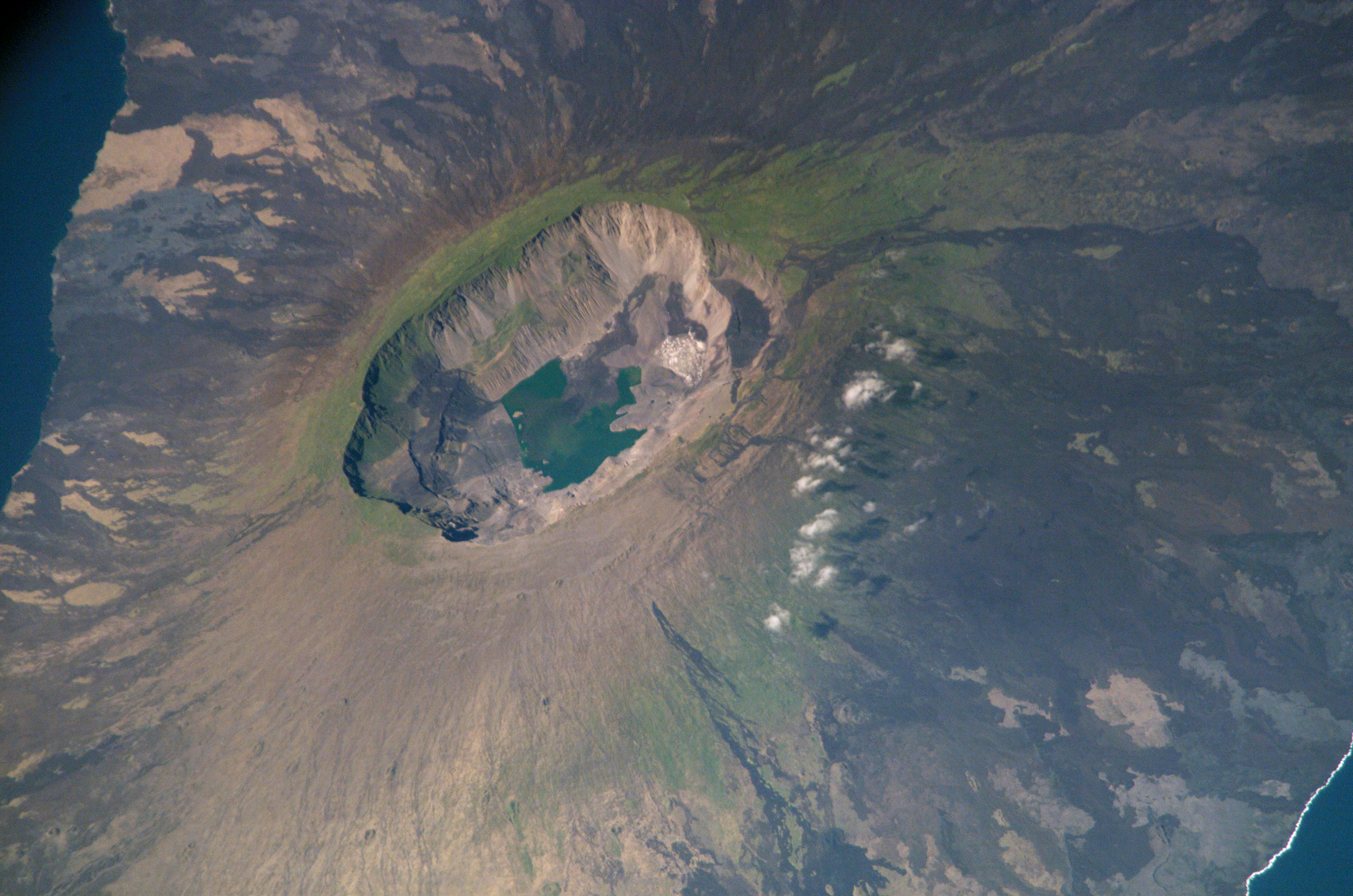
Satellite photograph of the summit caldera on Fernandina Island in the Galápagos archipelago

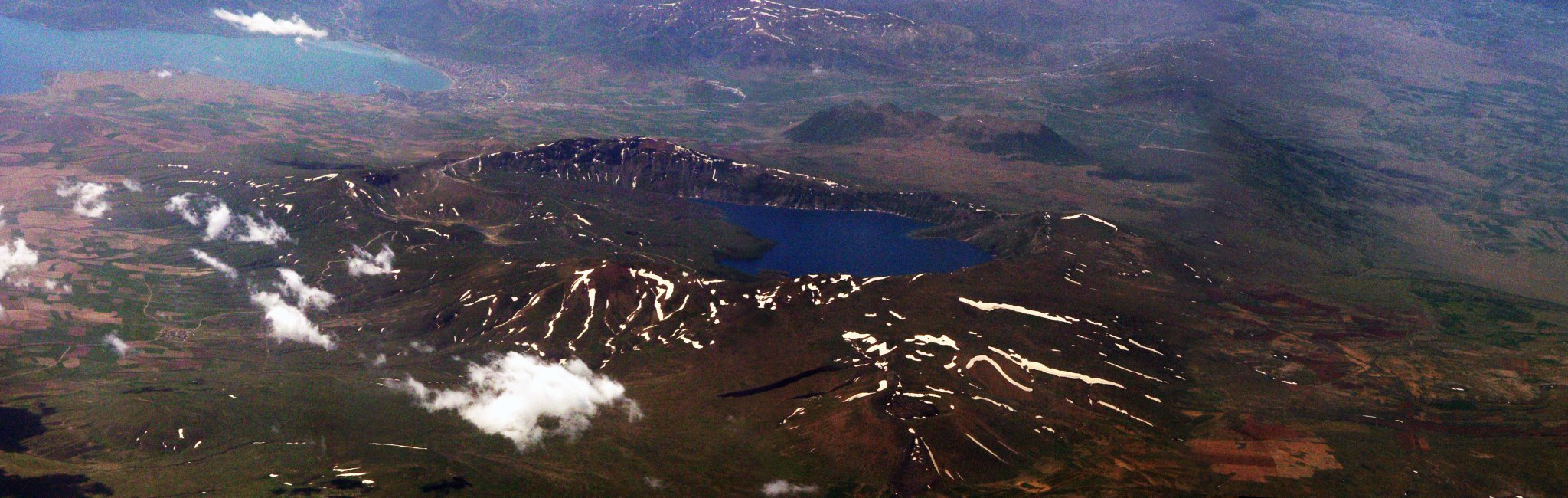
Oblique aerial photo of Nemrut Caldera, Van Lake, Eastern Turkey

=== Non-explosive calderas ===
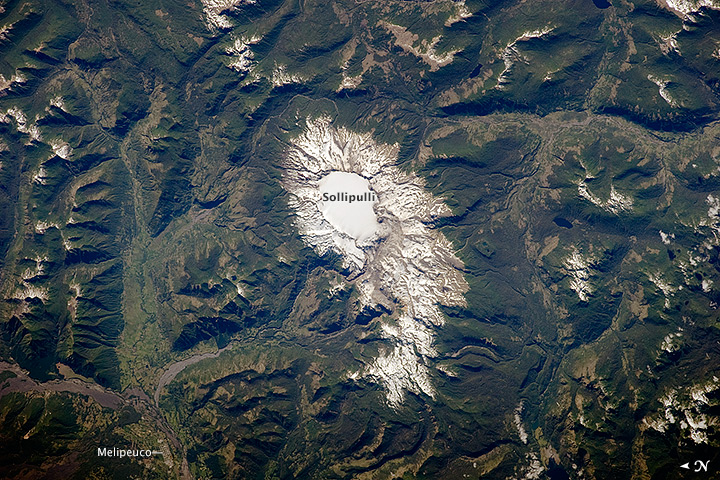
Sollipulli Caldera, located in central Chile near the border with Argentina, filled with ice. The volcano is in the southern Andes Mountains within Chile's Parque Nacional Villarica.

Some volcanoes, such as the large shield volcanoes Kīlauea and Mauna Loa on the island of Hawaii, form calderas in a different fashion. The magma feeding these volcanoes is basalt, which is silica poor. As a result, the magma is much less viscous than the magma of a rhyolitic volcano, and the magma chamber is drained by large lava flows rather than by explosive events. The resulting calderas are also known as subsidence calderas and can form more gradually than explosive calderas. For instance, the caldera atop Fernandina Island collapsed in 1968 when parts of the caldera floor dropped 350 metres (1,150 ft).

== Extraterrestrial calderas ==
Since the early 1960s, it has been known that volcanism has occurred on other planets and moons in the Solar System. Through the use of crewed and uncrewed spacecraft, volcanism has been discovered on Venus, Mars, the Moon, and Io, a satellite of Jupiter. None of these worlds have plate tectonics, which contributes approximately 60% of the Earth's volcanic activity (the other 40% is attributed to hotspot volcanism). Caldera structure is similar on all of these planetary bodies, though the size varies considerably. The average caldera diameter on Venus is 68 km (42 mi). The average caldera diameter on Io is close to 40 km (25 mi), and the mode is 6 km (3.7 mi); Tvashtar Paterae is likely the largest caldera with a diameter of 290 km (180 mi). The average caldera diameter on Mars is 48 km (30 mi), smaller than Venus. Calderas on Earth are the smallest of all planetary bodies and vary from 1.6–80 km (1–50 mi) as a maximum.

=== The Moon ===
The Moon has an outer shell of low-density crystalline rock that is a few hundred kilometers thick, which formed due to a rapid creation. The craters of the Moon have been well preserved through time and were once thought to have been the result of extreme volcanic activity, but are currently believed to have been formed by meteorites, nearly all of which took place in the first few hundred million years after the Moon formed. Around 500 million years afterward, the Moon's mantle was able to be extensively melted due to the decay of radioactive elements. Massive basaltic eruptions took place generally at the base of large impact craters. Also, eruptions may have taken place due to a magma reservoir at the base of the crust. This forms a dome, possibly the same morphology of a shield volcano where calderas universally are known to form. Although caldera-like structures are rare on the Moon, they are not completely absent. The Compton-Belkovich Volcanic Complex on the far side of the Moon is thought to be a caldera, possibly an ash-flow caldera.

=== Mars ===
The volcanic activity of Mars is concentrated in two major provinces: Tharsis and Elysium. Each province contains a series of giant shield volcanoes that are similar to what we see on Earth and likely are the result of mantle hot spots. The surfaces are dominated by lava flows, and all have one or more collapse calderas. Mars has the tallest volcano in the Solar System, Olympus Mons, which is more than three times the height of Mount Everest, with a diameter of 520 km (323 miles). The summit of the mountain has six nested calderas.

=== Venus ===
Because there is no plate tectonics on Venus, heat is mainly lost by conduction through the lithosphere. This causes enormous lava flows, accounting for 80% of Venus' surface area. Many of the mountains are large shield volcanoes that range in size from 150–400 km (95–250 mi) in diameter and 2–4 km (1.2–2.5 mi) high. More than 80 of these large shield volcanoes have summit calderas averaging 60 km (37 mi) across.

=== Io ===
Io, unusually, is heated by solid flexing due to the tidal influence of Jupiter and Io's orbital resonance with neighboring large moons Europa and Ganymede, which keep its orbit slightly eccentric. Unlike any of the planets mentioned, Io is continuously volcanically active. For example, the NASA Voyager 1 and Voyager 2 spacecraft detected nine erupting volcanoes while passing Io in 1979. Io has many calderas with diameters tens of kilometers across.

== List of volcanic calderas ==
=== Africa ===
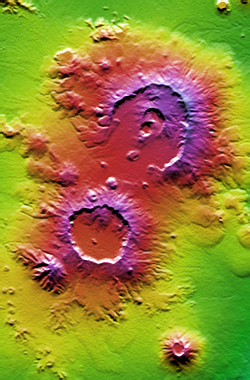
NASA False-colour topographical relief image of Nabro (top) and Mallahle volcanic calderas (centre left)

- Cape Verde
  - Mount Fogo (Fogo)
- Eritrea
  - Nabro Volcano (Southern Red Sea region)
- Ethiopia
  - Erta Ale (Afar Region)
  - Mallahle (Afar Region)
- Kenya
  - Menengai Crater (Great Rift Valley, Nakuru County)
  - Mount Elgon (Bungoma County and Trans Nzoia County, shared on border with Uganda)
  - Mount Longonot (Great Rift Valley, Nakuru County)
- Namibia
  - Brukkaros Mountain (ǁKaras Region)
  - Messum Crater (Erongo Region)
- Tanzania
  - Mount Meru (Arusha Region)
  - Ngorongoro Crater (Arusha Region)
- Uganda
  - Mount Elgon (Eastern Region, shared on border with Kenya)
- See Europe for calderas in the Canary Islands and the Azores

=== Antarctica ===
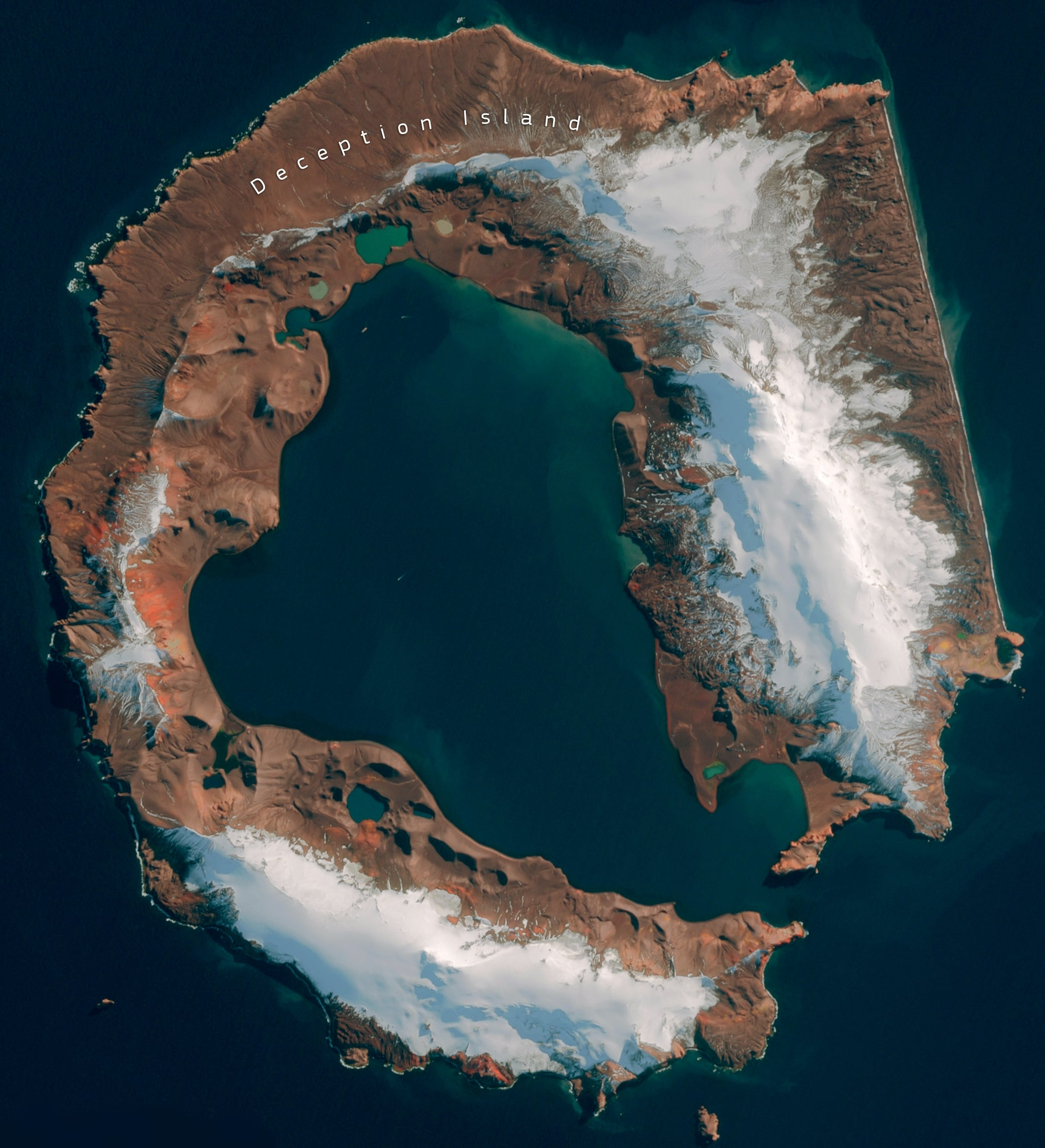
Satellite image of Deception Island by Sentinel-2 (March 2023)

- Deception Island
- Kemp Caldera

=== Asia ===
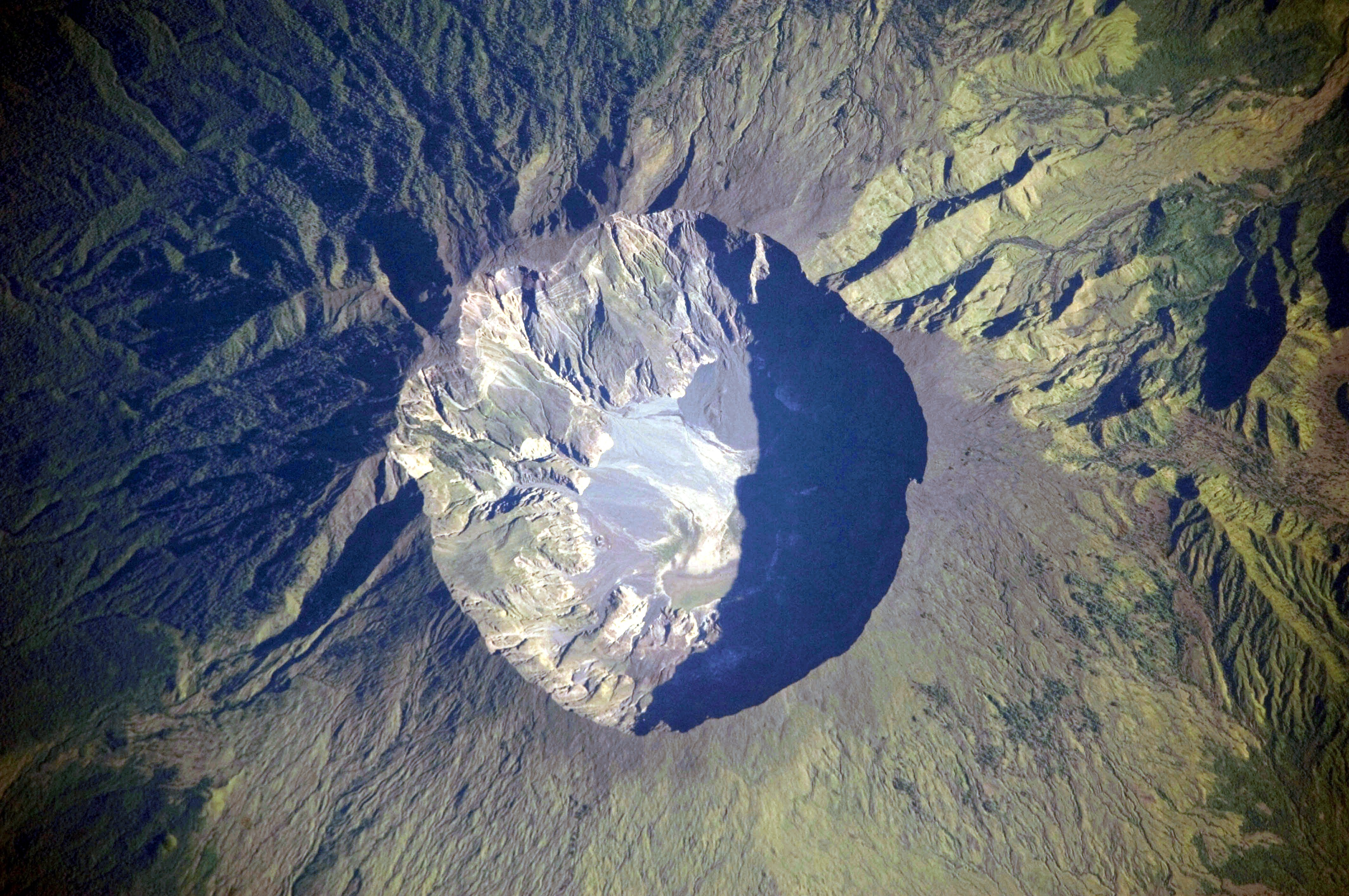
Caldera of Mount Tambora

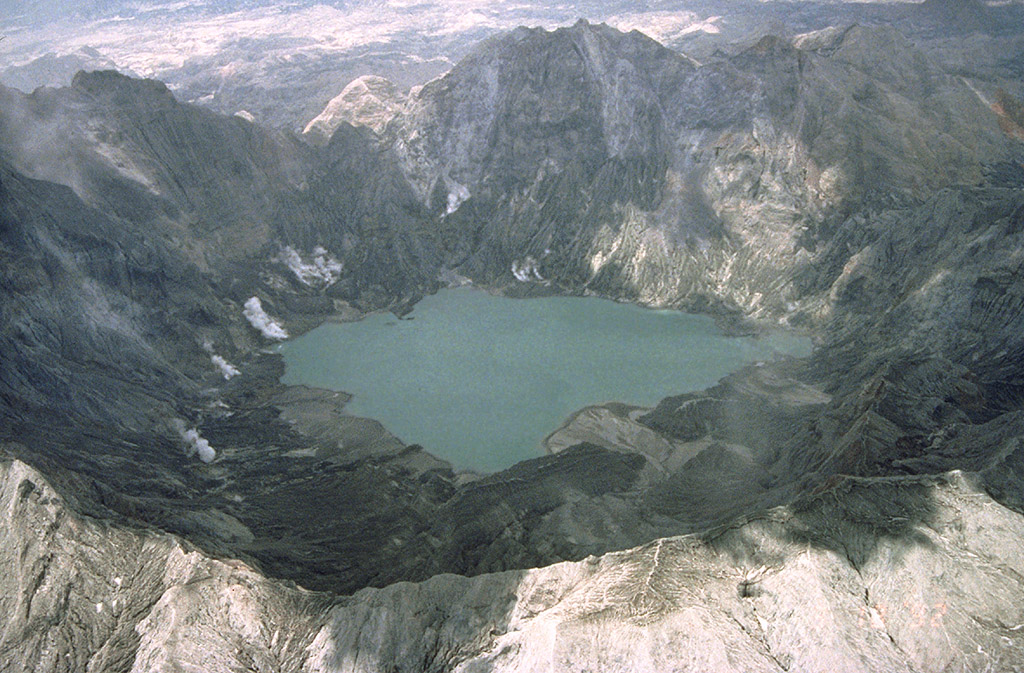
Mount Pinatubo, Philippines

- China
  - Dakantou Caldera (大墈头) (Shanhuyan Village, Taozhu Town, Linhai, Zhejiang)
  - Ma'anshan Caldera (马鞍山) (Shishan Town (石山镇), Xiuying, Hainan)
  - Yiyang Caldera (宜洋) (Shuangxi Town (双溪镇宜洋村), Pingnan County, Fujian)
- Indonesia
  - Batur (Bali)
  - Krakatoa (Sunda Strait)
  - Lake Maninjau (Sumatra)
  - Lake Toba (Sumatra)
  - Mount Rinjani (Lombok)
  - Mount Tondano (Sulawesi)
  - Mount Tambora (Sumbawa)
  - Tengger Caldera (Java)
- Japan
  - Aira Caldera (Kagoshima Prefecture)
  - Kussharo (Hokkaido)
  - Kuttara (Hokkaido)
  - Mashū (Hokkaido)
  - Aso Caldera, Mount Aso (Kumamoto Prefecture)
  - Kikai Caldera (Kagoshima Prefecture)
  - Towada (Aomori Prefecture)
  - Tazawa (Akita Prefecture)
  - Hakone (Kanagawa Prefecture)
- Korean Peninsula
  - Mount Halla (Jeju-do, South Korea)
  - Heaven Lake (Baekdu Mountain, North Korea/Changbai Mountains, China)
- Philippines
  - Apolaki Caldera (Benham Rise)
  - Corregidor Caldera (Manila Bay)
  - Mount Pinatubo (Luzon)
  - Taal Caldera (Luzon)
  - Laguna Caldera (Luzon)
  - Irosin Caldera (Luzon)
- Turkey
  - Derik (Mardin)
  - Nemrut (volcano)
- Russia
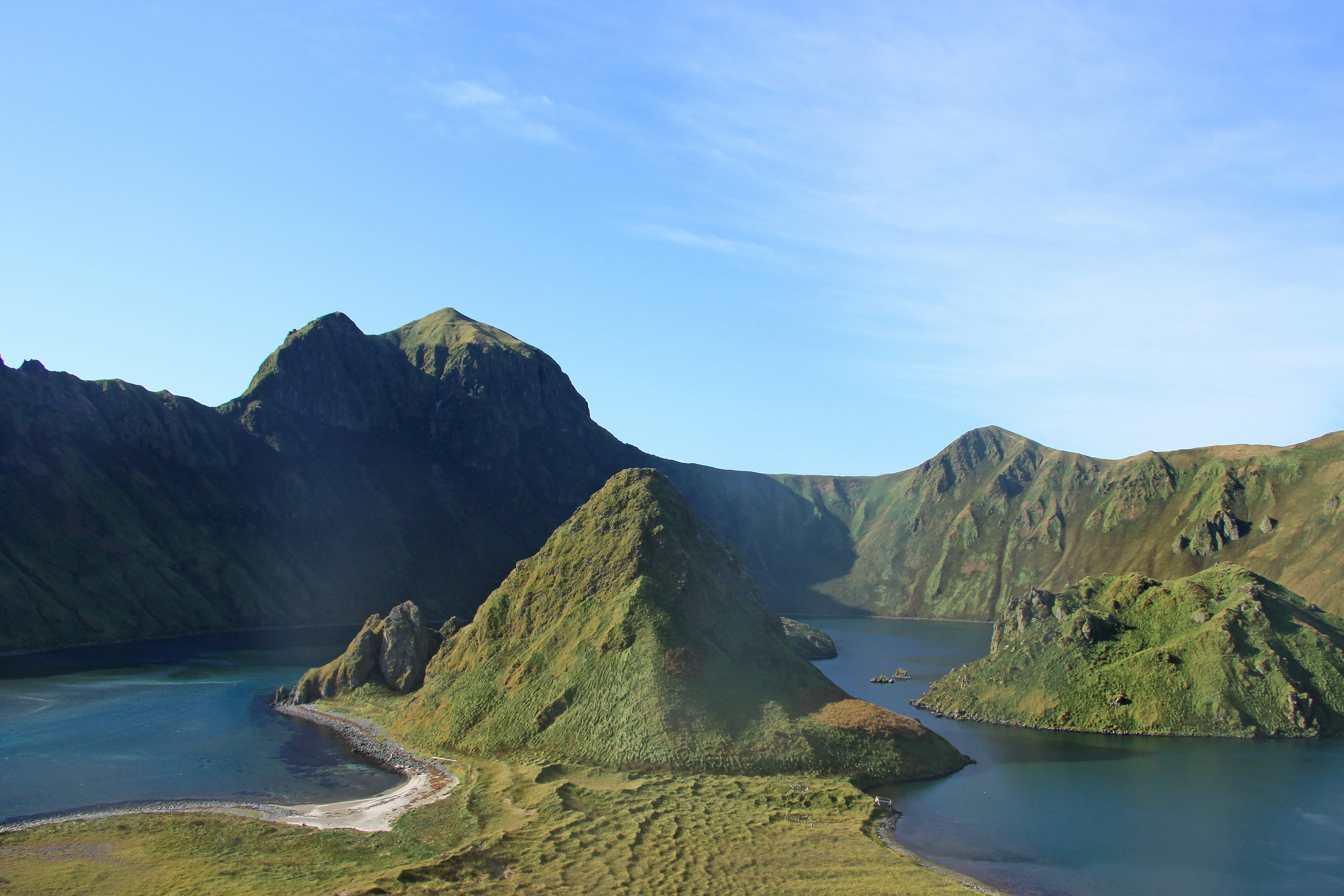
  Caldera of the island Yankicha/Ushishir, Kuril Islands
  - Akademia Nauk (Kamchatka Peninsula)
  - Golovnin (Kuril Islands)
  - Karymsky Caldera (Kamchatka Peninsula)
  - Karymshina (Kamchatka Peninsula)
  - Khangar (Kamchatka Peninsula)
  - Ksudach (Kamchatka Peninsula)
  - Kurile Lake (Kamchatka Peninsula)
  - Pauzhetka caldera (hosts Kurile Lake caldera, Kamchatka Peninsula)
  - Lvinaya Past (Kuril Islands)
  - Tao-Rusyr Caldera (Kuril Islands)
  - Uzon (Kamchatka Peninsula)
  - Zavaritski Caldera (Kuril Islands)
  - Yankicha/Ushishir (Kuril Islands)
  - Chegem Caldera (Kabardino-Balkarian Republic, North Caucasus)

=== Europe ===
3D CGI aerial spinning view over Santorini, Greece

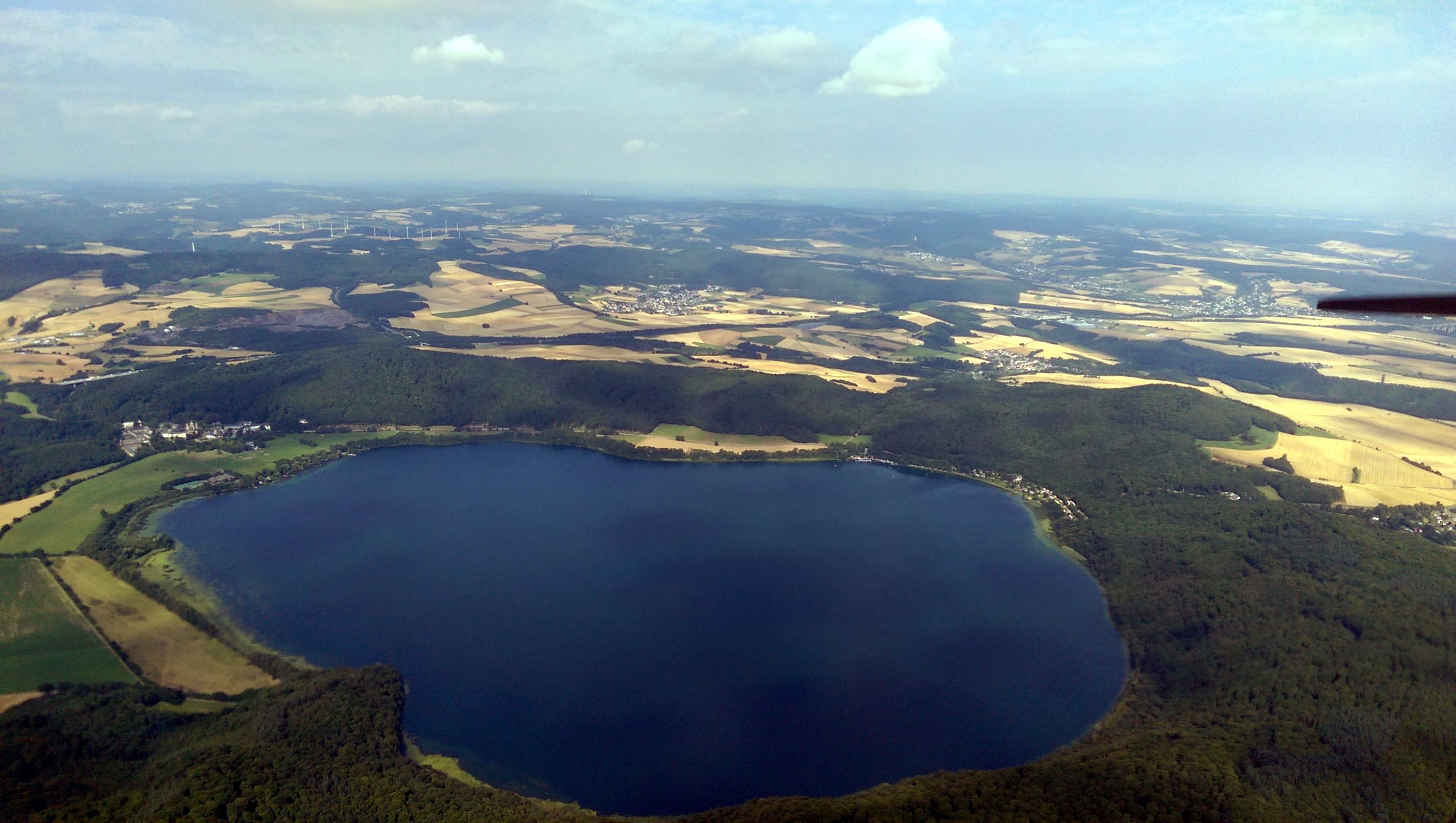
Aerial view of the Laacher See, Germany

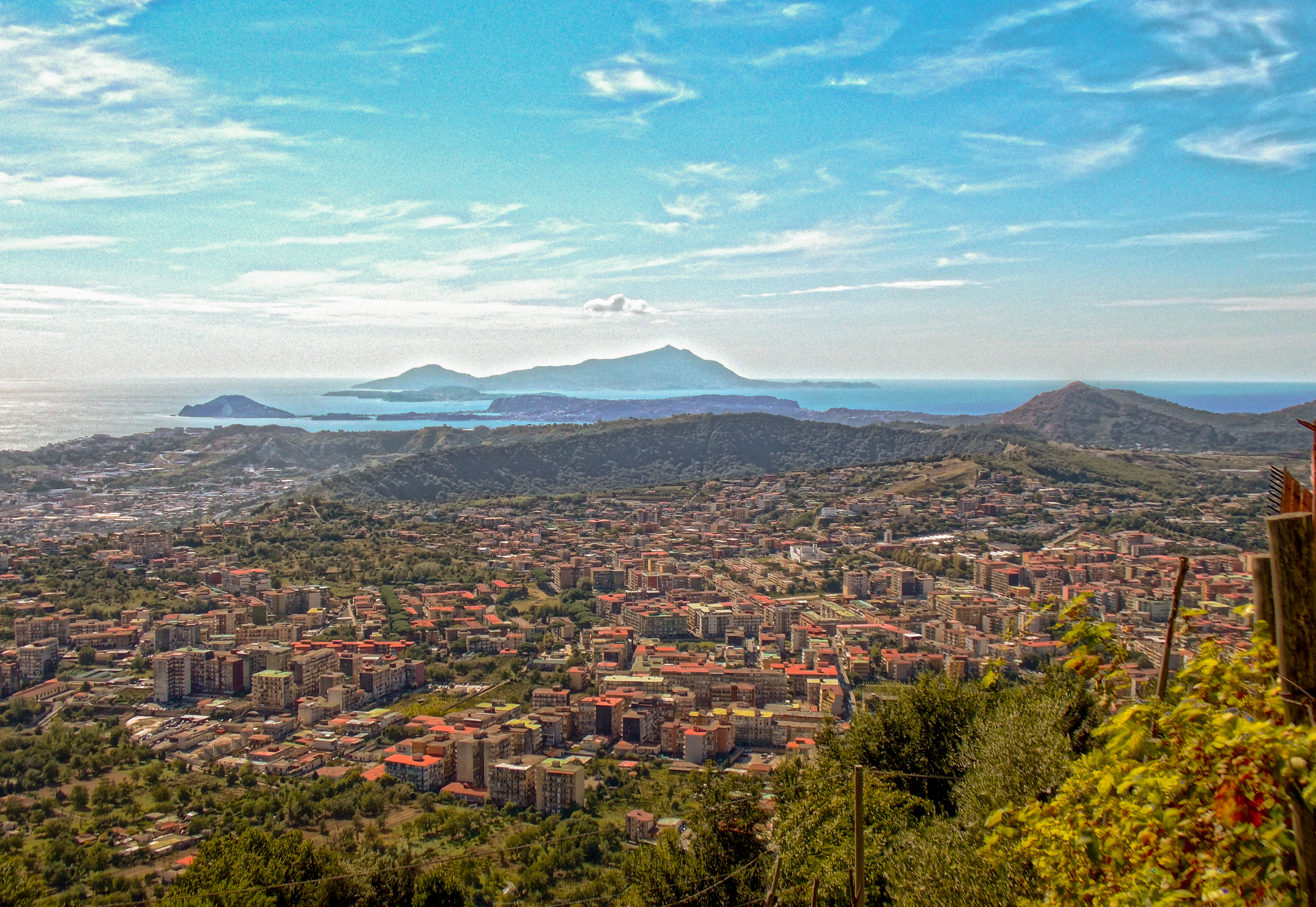
View of the Phlegraean Fields near Naples, Italy

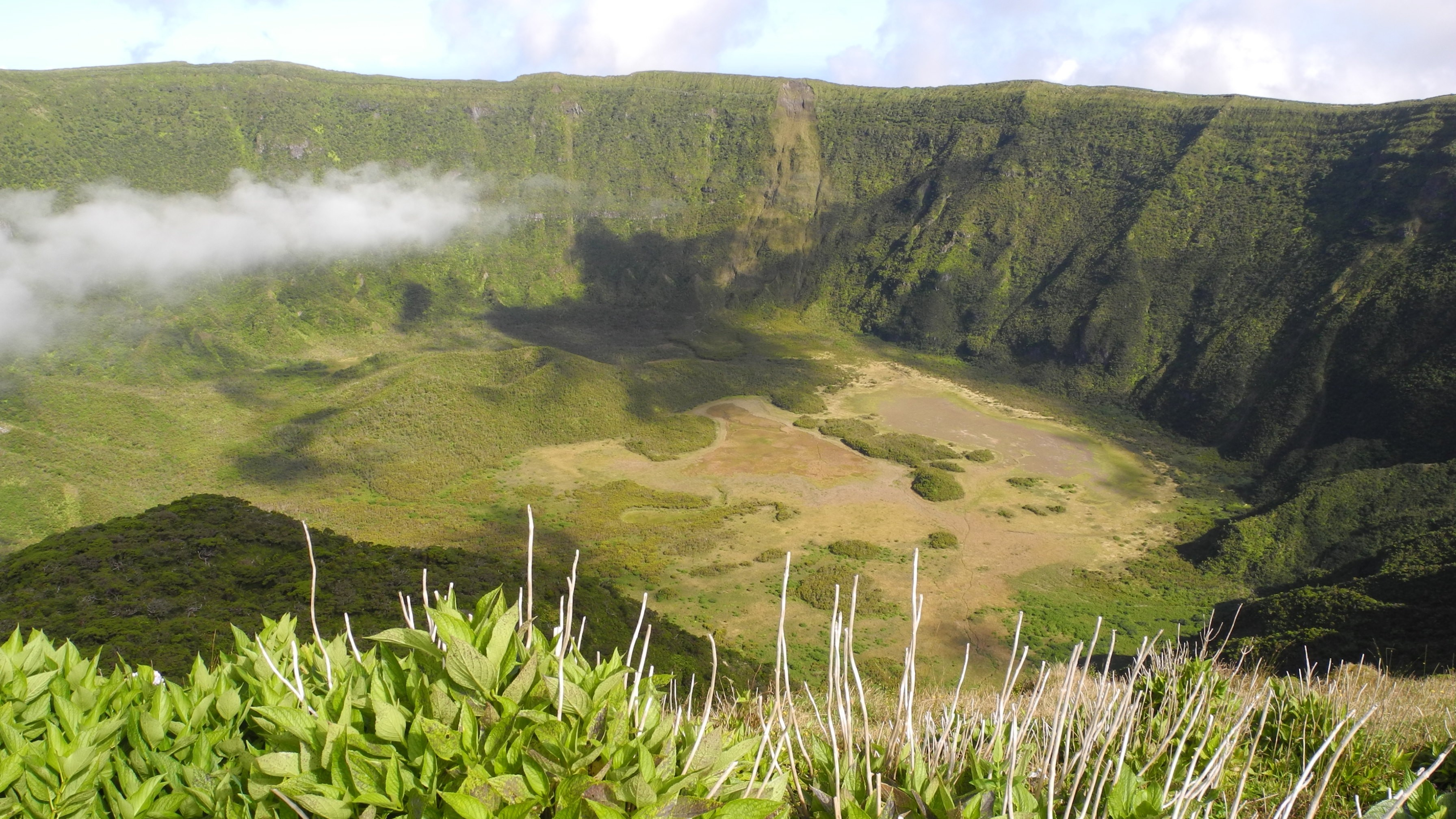
Caldeira do Faial on the Caldeira Volcano, Faial Island, Azores

- Georgia
  - Bakuriani/Didveli Caldera
  - Samsari
- Germany
  - Laacher See
- Greece
  - Santorini
  - Nisyros
- Iceland
  - Askja
  - Grímsvötn
  - Bárðarbunga
  - Katla
  - Krafla
- Italy
  - Phlegraean Fields
  - Lake Bracciano
  - Lake Bolsena
  - Mount Somma which contains Mount Vesuvius
- Portugal
  - Lagoa das Sete Cidades & Furnas (São Miguel, the Azores)
  - Caldeira do Faial (Faial)
  - Caldeirão do Corvo (Corvo)
- United Kingdom
  - Glen Coe (Scotland)
  - Scafell Caldera (Lake District, England)
- Slovakia
  - Banská Štiavnica
- Spain
  - Las Cañadas (Tenerife, Canary Islands)

=== North and Central America ===
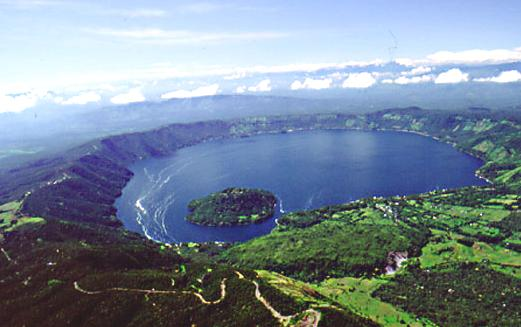
Coatepeque Caldera, El Salvador crater lake

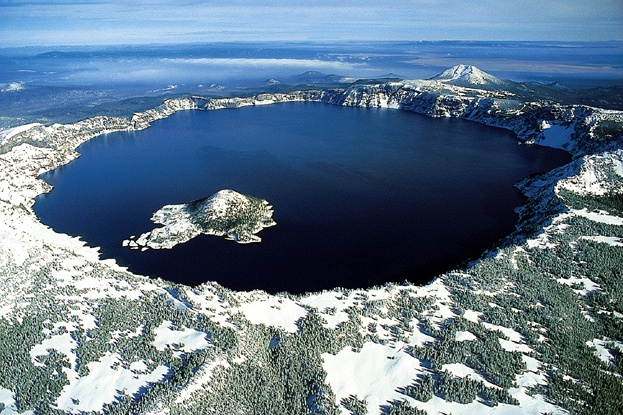
Crater Lake, Oregon, formed around 5,680 BC

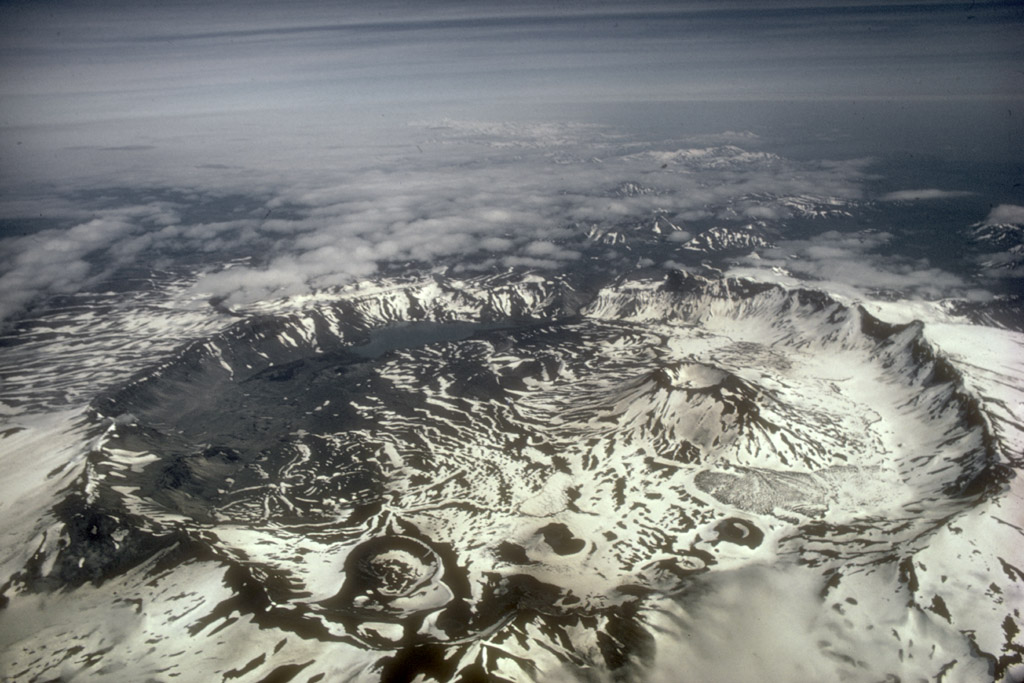
Aniakchak-caldera, Alaska

- Canada
  - Silverthrone Caldera (British Columbia)
  - Mount Edziza (British Columbia)
  - Bennett Lake Volcanic Complex (British Columbia/Yukon)
  - Mount Pleasant Caldera (New Brunswick)
  - Sturgeon Lake Caldera (Ontario)
  - Mount Skukum Volcanic Complex (Yukon)
  - Blake River Megacaldera Complex (Quebec/Ontario)
  - New Senator Caldera (Quebec)
  - Misema Caldera (Ontario/Quebec)
  - Noranda Caldera (Quebec)
- Mexico
  - La primavera Caldera (Jalisco)
  - Amealco Caldera (Querétaro)
  - Las Cumbres Caldera (Veracruz-Puebla)
  - Los Azufres Caldera (Michoacán)
  - Los Humeros Caldera (Veracruz-Puebla)
  - Mazahua Caldera (Mexico State)
- El Salvador
  - Lake Ilopango
  - Lake Coatepeque
- Guatemala
  - Lake Amatitlán
  - Lake Atitlán
  - Xela
  - Barahona
- Nicaragua
  - Masaya (Nicaragua)
- United States
  - Mount Aniakchak (Aniakchak National Monument and Preserve) (Alaska)
  - Cochetopa Caldera (Colorado)
  - Crater Lake on Mount Mazama (Crater Lake National Park, Oregon)
  - Mount Katmai (Alaska)
  - Kīlauea (Hawaii)
  - Mauna Loa (Hawaii)
  - La Garita Caldera (Colorado)
  - Long Valley (California)
  - Henry's Fork Caldera (Idaho)
  - Island Park Caldera (Idaho, Wyoming)
  - Mount Ossippee (New Hampshire)
  - Newberry Volcano (Oregon)
  - McDermitt Caldera (Oregon)
  - Medicine Lake Volcano (California)
  - Mount Okmok (Alaska)
  - Valles Caldera (New Mexico)
  - Yellowstone Caldera (Wyoming)

=== Indian Ocean ===
- Cirque de Cilaos (Réunion)
- Cirque de Mafate (Réunion)
- Cirque de Salazie (Réunion)
- Enclos Fouqué (Réunion)

=== Oceania ===
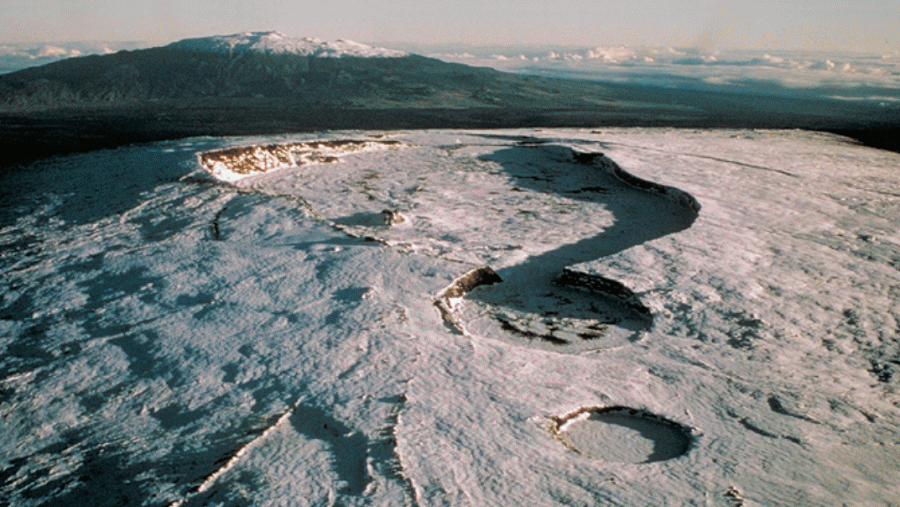
Mokuʻāweoweo, Mauna Loa's summit caldera, covered in snow

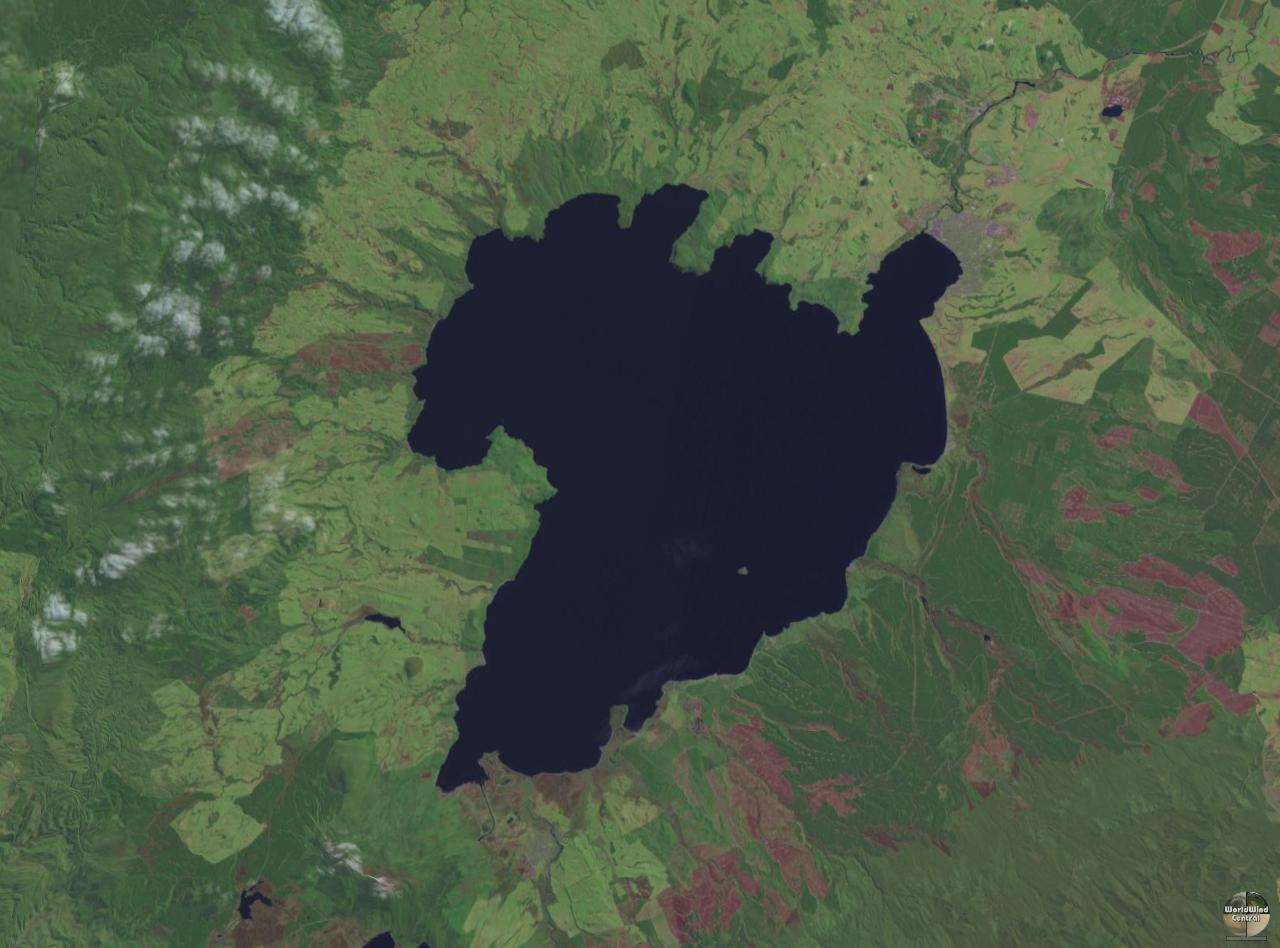
Satellite photo of Lake Taupō

- Australia
  - Cerberean Cauldron
  - Mount Warning
  - Prospect Hill
- Hawaii
  - Kilauea (Hawaii, US)
  - Moku'āweoweo Caldera on Mauna Loa (Hawaii, US)
- New Zealand
  - Kapenga
  - Lake Ohakuri
  - Lake Okataina
  - Lake Rotorua
  - Lake Taupō
  - Maroa
  - Otago Harbour
  - Reporoa caldera
- Papua New Guinea
  - Dakataua
- Polynesia
  - Rano Kau (Easter Island, Chile)
- Tonga
  - Hunga Tonga–Hunga Haʻapai

=== South America ===
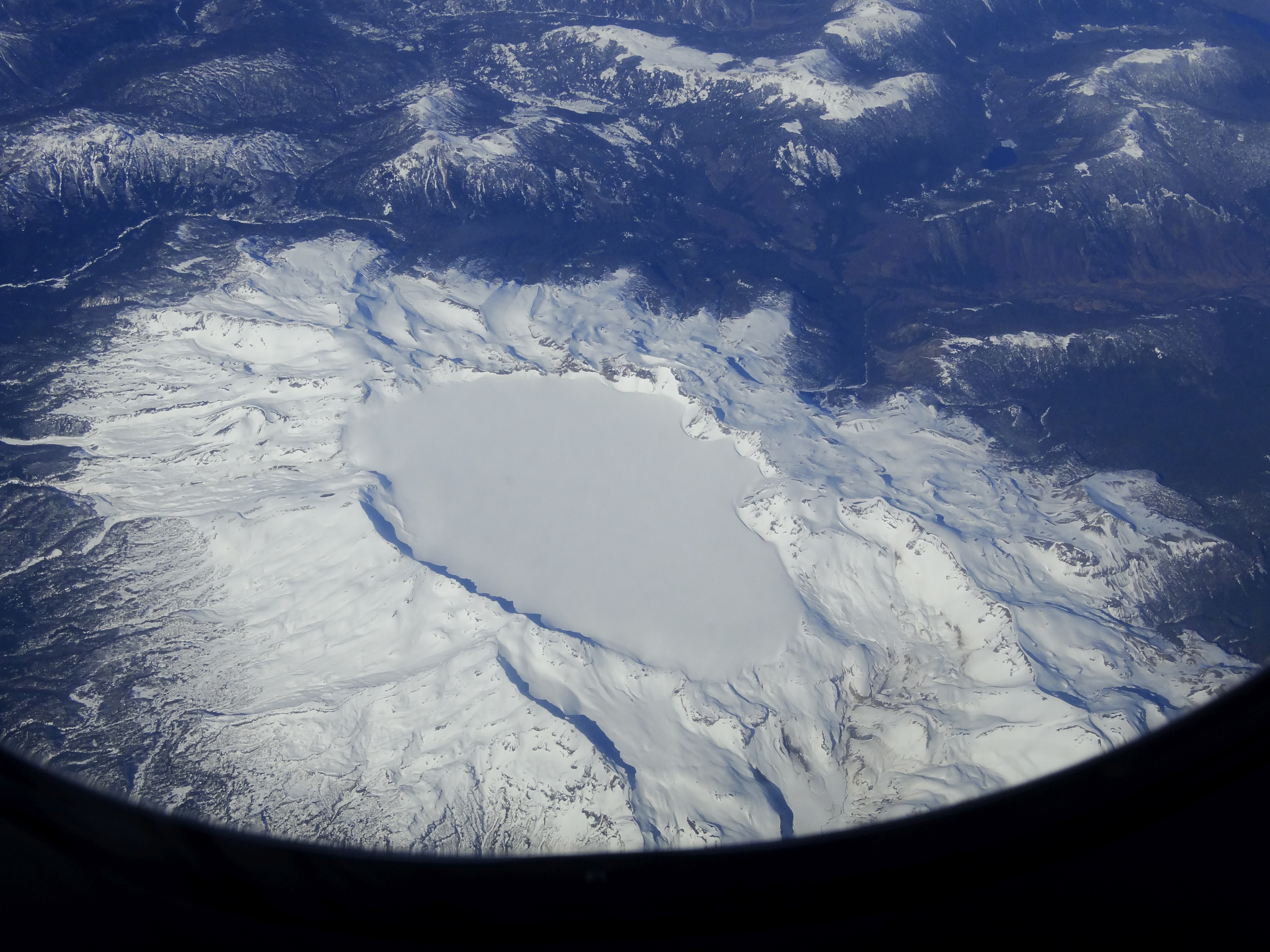
Aerial photograph of Sollipulli caldera, looking east

- Argentina
  - Aguas Calientes, Salta Province
  - Caldera del Atuel, Mendoza Province
  - Galán, Catamarca Province
- Bolivia
  - Pastos Grandes
- Colombia
  - Arenas crater caldera, Nevado del Ruiz volcano, Caldas Department
  - Laguna Verde caldera, Azufral volcano, Narino Department
- Chile
  - Chaitén
  - Cordillera Nevada Caldera
  - Laguna del Maule
  - Pacana Caldera
  - Sollipulli
- Ecuador
  - Pululahua Geobotanical Reserve
  - Cuicocha
  - Quilotoa
  - Fernandina Island, Galápagos Islands
  - Sierra Negra (Galápagos)
  - Chacana Caldera

== Extraterrestrial volcanic calderas ==
- Mars
  - Olympus Mons caldera
- Venus
  - Maat Mons caldera

== Erosion calderas ==
- Americas
  - Guaichane-Mamuta (Chile)
  - Mount Tehama (California, US)
- Europe
  - Caldera de Taburiente (Spain)
- Oceania
  - Tweed Valley (New South Wales, Queensland, Australia)
- Asia
  - Chegem Caldera (Kabardino-Balkarian Republic, Northern Caucasus Region, Russia)

== See also ==
- Complex volcano – Landform of more than one related volcanic centre
- Maar – Low-relief volcanic crater
- Somma volcano – Volcanic caldera that has been partially filled by a new central cone
- Supervolcano – Volcano that has erupted with a volcanic explosivity index of 8
- Volcanic Explosivity Index – (VEI) Predictive qualitative scale for explosiveness of volcanic eruptions
