= Canadian Shield =

Geographic and geologic area of North America

- Stratigraphic range: Precambrian
- Type: Shield
- Unit of: North American Craton
- Sub-units: Davis Region; James Region; Kazan Region; Laurentian Region
- Area: 8,000,000 km^{2}

Location
- Coordinates: 52°00′N 71°00′W
- Region: North America
- Country: Canada; Greenland; United States
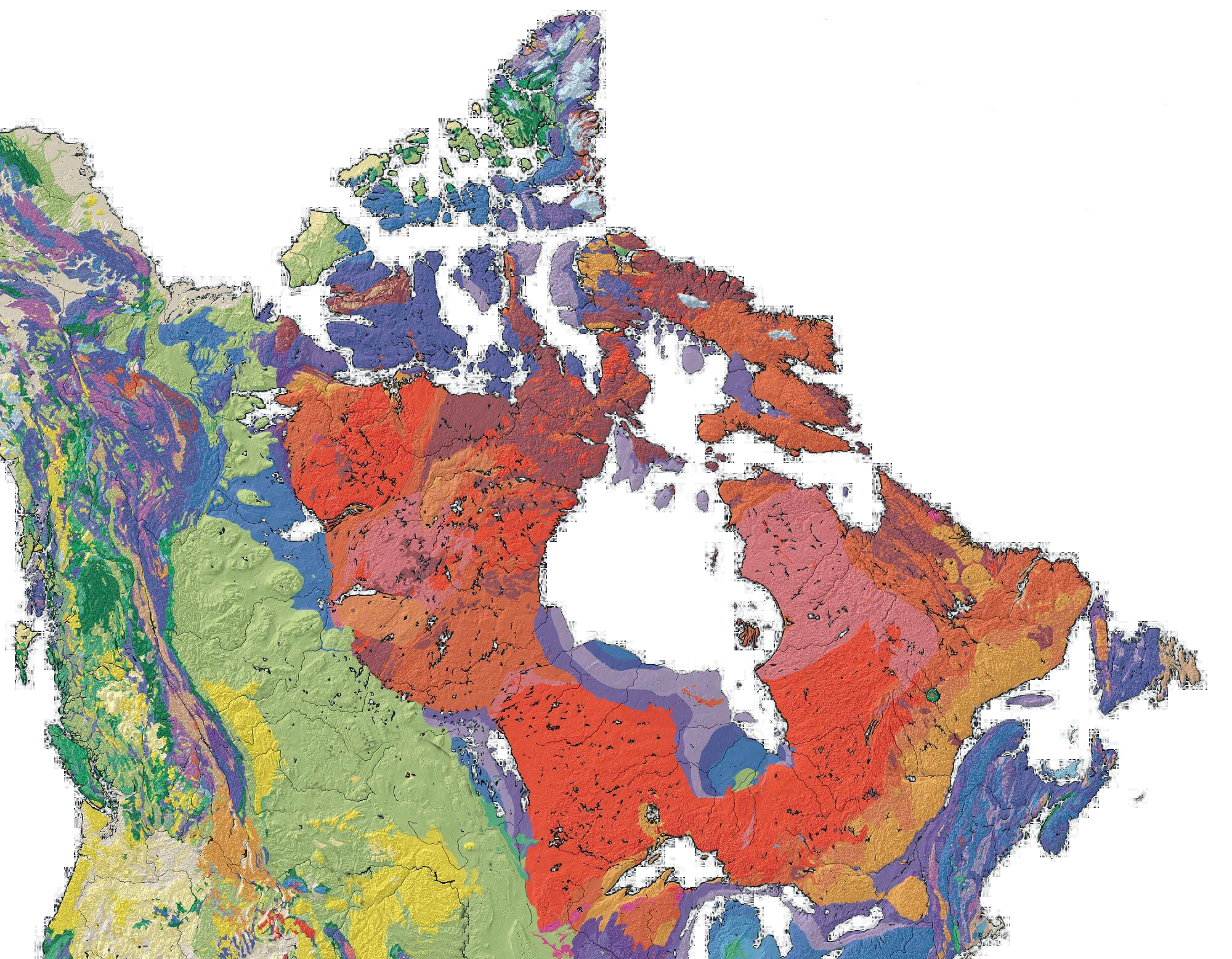
- The Canadian Shield is a broad region of Precambrian rock (pictured in shades of red) that encircles Hudson Bay. It spans eastern, northeastern, and east-central Canada and the upper midwestern United States.

The Canadian Shield (French: Bouclier canadien [buklje kanadjɛ̃]), also called the Laurentian Shield or the Laurentian Plateau, is a geologic shield, a large area of exposed Precambrian igneous and high-grade metamorphic rocks. It forms the North American Craton (or Laurentia), the ancient geologic core of the North American continent. Glaciation has left the area with only a thin layer of soil, through which exposures of igneous bedrock, resulting from its long volcanic history, are frequently visible. As a deep, common, joined bedrock region in eastern and central Canada, it also extends south into the northern reaches of the contiguous United States.

== Geographical extent ==
The Canadian Shield is a physiographic region comprising four smaller physiographic provinces: the Davis Region, the James Region, the Kazan Region, and the Laurentian Region. The Canadian Shield is a subsection of the Laurentia craton signifying the area of greatest glacial impact (scraping down to bare rock) creating the thin soils. The age of the Canadian Shield is estimated to be 4.28 Ga (4.28 billion years). The Canadian Shield once had jagged peaks, higher than any of today's mountains, but millions of years of erosion have transformed these mountains to rolling hills.

When the Greenland section is included, the Canadian Shield is approximately circular, bounded on the northeast by the northeast edge of Greenland, with Hudson Bay in the middle. It covers much of Greenland, all of Labrador and the Great Northern Peninsula of Newfoundland, most of Quebec north of the St. Lawrence River, much of Ontario including northern sections of the Ontario Peninsula, the Adirondack Mountains of New York, the northernmost part of Lower Michigan and all of Upper Michigan, northern Wisconsin, northeastern Minnesota, the central and northern portions of Manitoba, northern Saskatchewan, a small portion of northeastern Alberta, mainland Northwest Territories to the east of a line extended north from the Saskatchewan–Alberta border, most of Nunavut's mainland and, of its Arctic Archipelago, Baffin Island and significant bands through Somerset, Southampton, Devon and Ellesmere islands. In total, the exposed area of the shield covers approximately 8,000,000 km^{2} (3,100,000 mi^{2}). The true extent of the shield is greater still and stretches from the Western Cordillera in the west to the Appalachians in the east and as far south as Texas, but these regions are overlaid with much younger rocks and sediment.

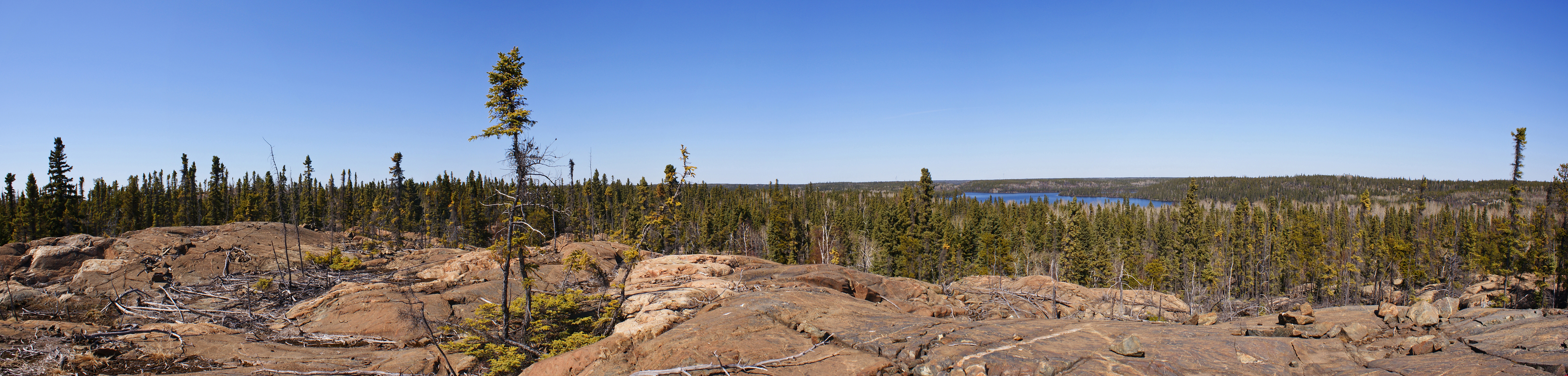
Panorama of typical Canadian Shield geography in the Flin Flon, Manitoba, region. Big Island Lake (Manitoba) is in the background.

== Geology ==
The Canadian Shield is among the oldest geologic areas on Earth, with regions dating from 2.5 to 4.2 billion years. The multitude of rivers and lakes in the region is classical example of a deranged drainage system, caused by the watersheds of the area being disturbed by glaciation and the effect of post-glacial rebound. The shield was originally an area of very large, very tall mountains (about 12,000 m or 39,000 ft) with much volcanic activity, but the area was eroded to nearly its current topographic appearance of relatively low relief over 500 Ma. Erosion has exposed the roots of the mountains, which take the form of greenstone belts in which belts of volcanic rock that have been altered by metamorphism are surrounded by granitic rock. These belts range in age from 3.6 to 2.7 Ga. Much of the granitic rock belongs to the distinctive tonalite–trondhjemite–granodiorite family of rocks, which are characteristic of Archean continental crust. Many of Canada's major ore deposits are associated with greenstone belts.

The Sturgeon Lake Caldera in Kenora District, Ontario, is one of the world's best preserved mineralized Neoarchean caldera complexes, which is 2.7 Ga. The Canadian Shield also contains the Mackenzie dike swarm, which is the largest dike swarm known on Earth. The North American craton is the bedrock forming the heart of the North American continent, and the Canadian Shield is the largest exposed part of the craton's bedrock. The Canadian Shield is part of an ancient continent called Arctica, which was formed about 2.5 Ga during the Neoarchean era.

Mountains have deep roots and float on the denser mantle much like an iceberg at sea. As mountains erode, their roots rise and are eroded in turn. The rocks that now form the surface of the shield were once far below the Earth's surface. The high pressures and temperatures at those depths provided ideal conditions for mineralization. Although these mountains are now heavily eroded, many large mountains still exist in Canada's far north called the Arctic Cordillera. This is a vast, deeply dissected mountain range, stretching from northernmost Ellesmere Island to the northernmost tip of Labrador. The range's highest peak is Nunavut's Barbeau Peak at 2,616 metres (8,583 ft) above sea level. Precambrian rock is the major component of the bedrock.

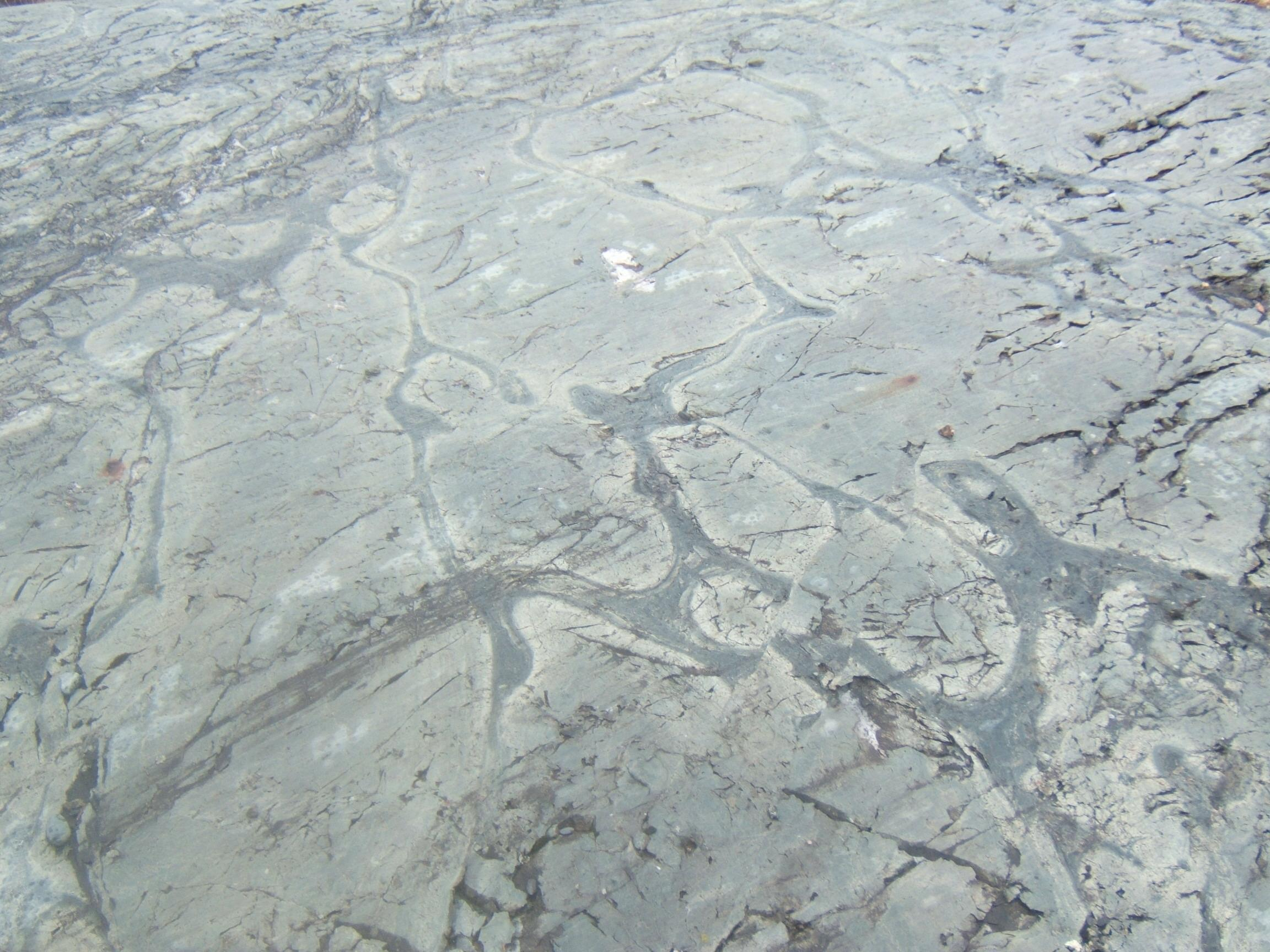
Weathered Precambrian pillow lava in the Temagami Greenstone Belt

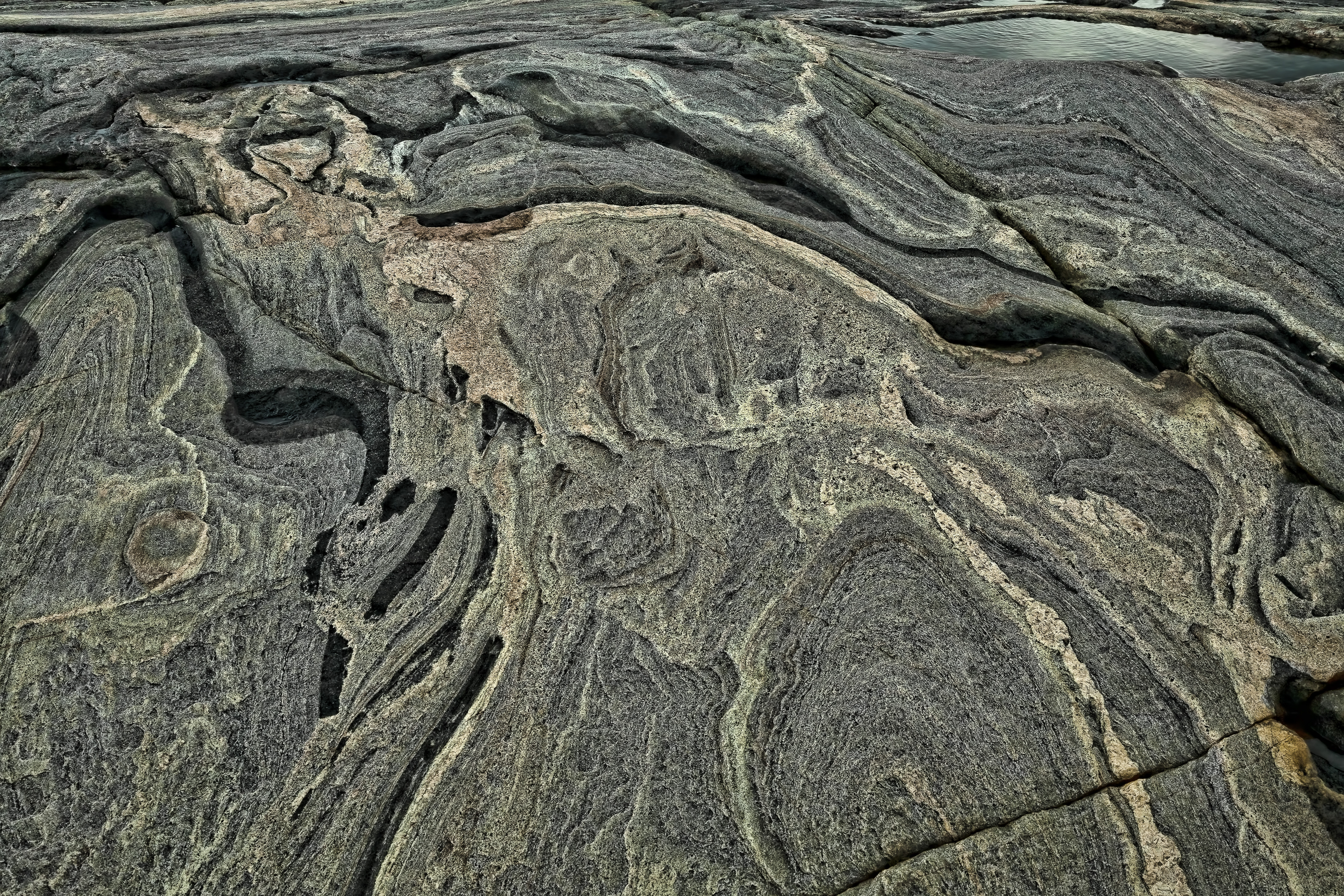
Folded Precambrian gneiss of the Canadian Shield in Georgian Bay, Ontario

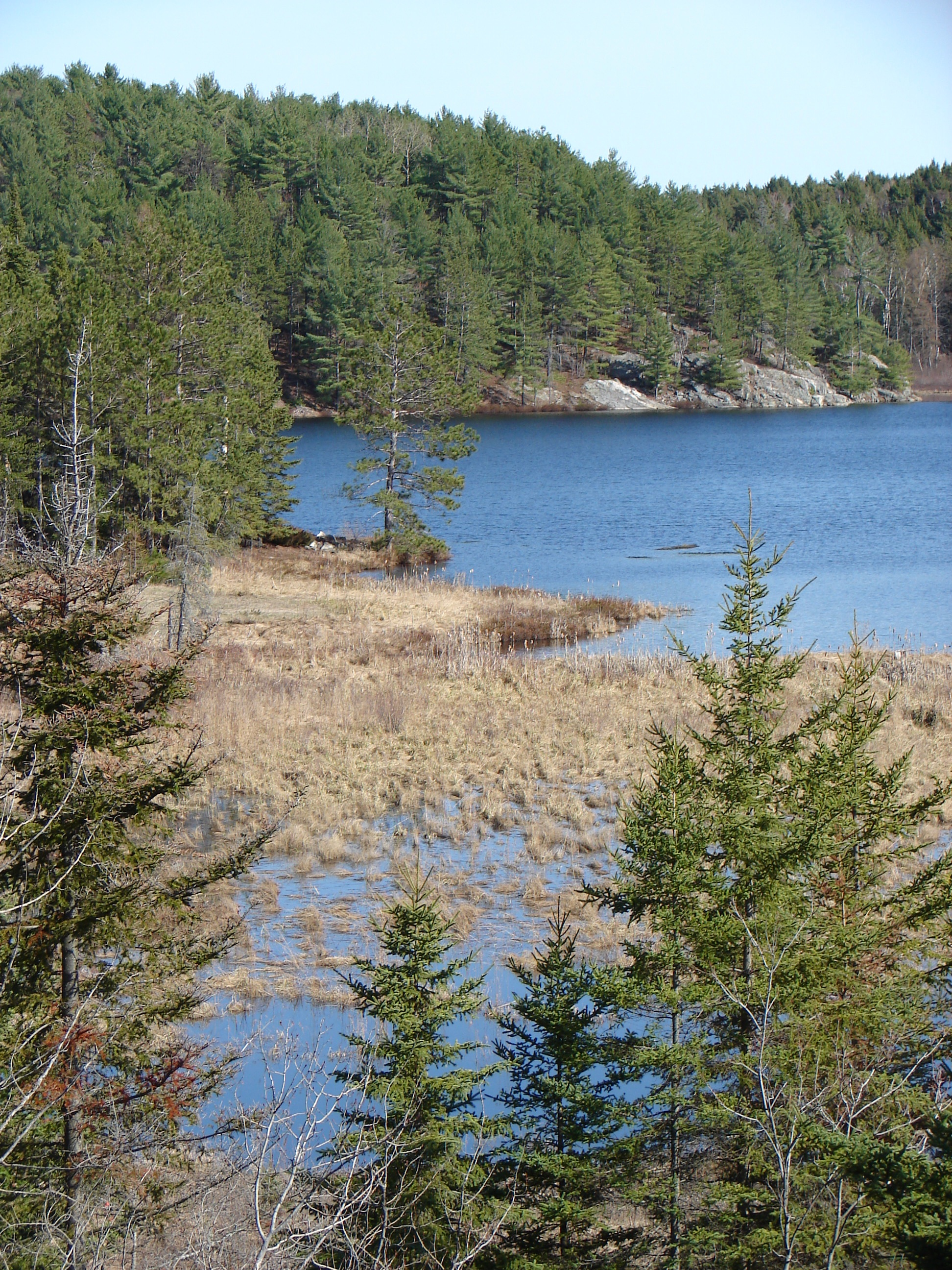
Typical Canadian Shield landscape: spruce, lakes, bogs, and rock

== Ecology ==
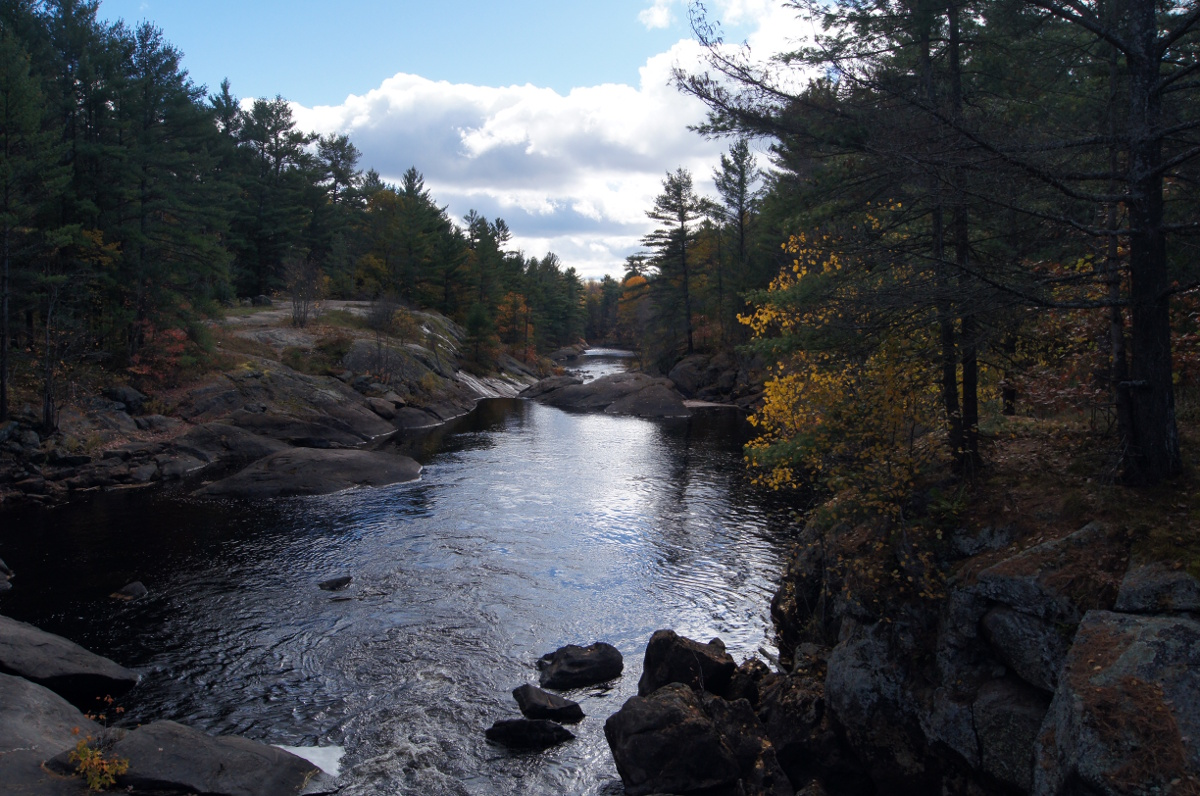
Typical shield landscape in a southern Ontario region with very few old growth trees, due to a history of logging and fires. Black River, Queen Elizabeth II Wildlands Provincial Park.

The current surface expression of the shield is one of very thin soil lying on top of the bedrock, with many bare outcrops. This arrangement was caused by severe glaciation during the ice ages that covered the shield and scraped the rock clean. The lowlands of the Canadian Shield have a very dense soil that is not suitable for forestation; it also contains many marshes and bogs (muskeg). The rest of the region has coarse soil that does not retain moisture well and is frozen with permafrost throughout the year. Forests are not as dense in the north.

The shield is covered in parts by vast boreal forests in the south that support natural ecosystems as well as a major logging industry. The boreal forest area gives way to the Eastern Canadian Shield taiga that covers northern Quebec and most of Labrador. The Midwestern Canadian Shield forests that run westwards from Northwestern Ontario have boreal forests that give way to taiga in the most northerly parts of Manitoba and Saskatchewan. Hydrologic drainage is generally poor, the soil-compacting effects of glaciation being one of the many causes. Tundra typically prevails in the northern regions.

Many mammals such as beaver, caribou, white-tailed deer, moose, wolves, wolverines, weasels, mink, otters, grizzly bear, polar bears and black bears are present. In the case of polar bears (Ursus maritimus), the shield area contains many of their denning locations, such as the Wapusk National Park. The many lakes and rivers on the shield contain a plentiful quantity of different sports fish species, including walleye, northern pike, lake trout, yellow perch, whitefish, brook trout, arctic grayling, and many types of baitfish. The water surfaces are also home to many waterfowl, most notably Canada geese, loons and gulls. The vast forests contain a myriad population of other birds, including ravens and crows, predatory birds and many songbirds.

== Mining and economics ==
The Canadian Shield is one of the world's richest areas for mineral ores. It is filled with substantial deposits of nickel, gold, silver, and copper. There are many mining towns extracting these minerals. The largest, and one of the best known, is Sudbury, Ontario. Sudbury is an exception to the normal process of forming minerals in the shield since the Sudbury Basin is an ancient meteorite impact crater. Ejecta from the meteorite impact was found in the Rove Formation in May 2007. The nearby but less-known Temagami Magnetic Anomaly has striking similarities to the Sudbury Basin. This suggests it could be a second metal-rich impact crater. In northeastern Quebec, the giant Manicouagan Reservoir is the site of an extensive hydroelectric project (Manic-cinq, or Manic-5). This is one of the largest-known meteorite impact craters on Earth, though not as large as the Sudbury crater.

The Flin Flon greenstone belt in central Manitoba and east-central Saskatchewan "is one of the largest Paleoproterozoic volcanic-hosted massive sulfide (VMS) districts in the world, containing 27 copper-zinc-(gold) deposits from which more than 183 million tonnes of sulfide have been mined." The portion in the Northwest Territories has recently been the site of several major diamond discoveries. The kimberlite pipes in which the diamonds are found are closely associated with cratons, which provide the deep lithospheric mantle required to stabilize diamond as a mineral. The kimberlite eruptions then bring the diamonds from over 150 kilometres (93 mi) depth to the surface. The Diavik mine, the longest running diamond mine in Canada, stopped producing diamonds in 2026 after 23 years.

== See also ==
- Athabasca Basin
- Baltic Shield
- Basement (geology)
- Geography of Canada
- Geology of Ontario
- Glacial history of Minnesota
- Platform (geology)
- Volcanology of Canada
- Wisconsin glaciation
