= Bon Echo Provincial Park =

Provincial park in Ontario, Canada

- IUCN category II (national park)
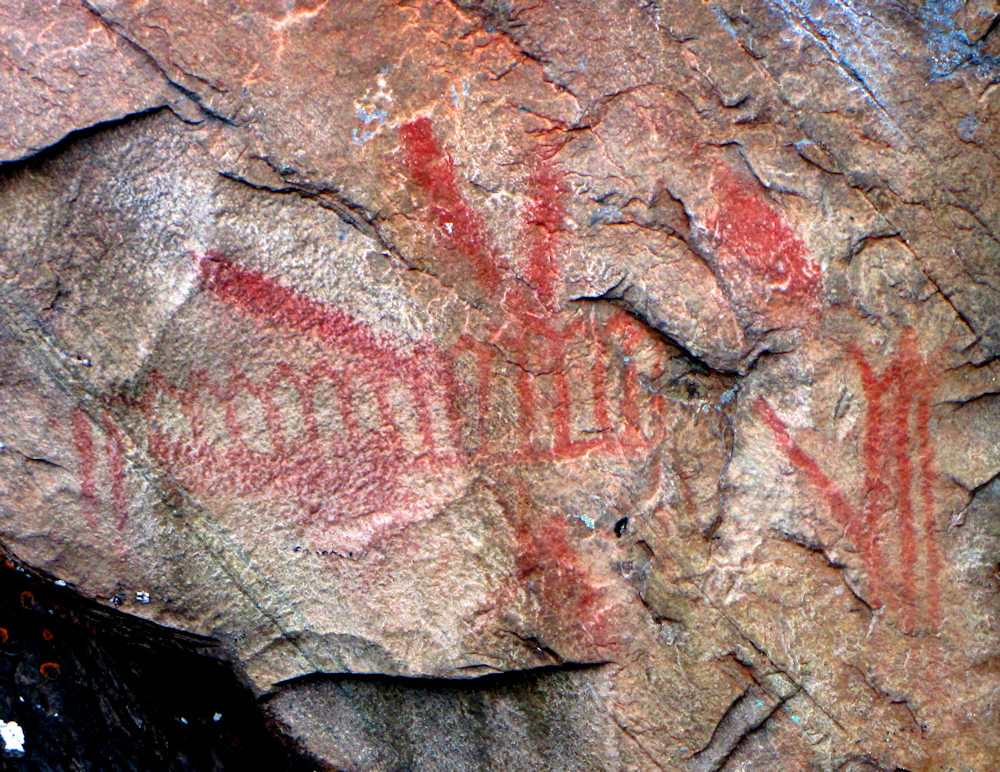
- Some of the pictographs on Mazinaw Rock

- Location within Southern Ontario
- Interactive map of Bon Echo Provincial Park
- Location: Cloyne, Ontario, Canada
- Nearest city: Napanee, Ontario
- Coordinates: 44°54′14″N 77°15′18″W
- Area: 66.43 km^{2} (25.65 sq mi)
- Established: 1965
- Visitors: 187,099 (in 2022)
- Governing body: Ontario Parks
- Website: ontarioparks.ca/park/bonecho

National Historic Site of Canada
- Official name: Mazinaw Pictographs National Historic Site of Canada
- Designated: June 1982

Bon Echo Provincial Park is a provincial park in southeastern Ontario, Canada, which is owned and operated by Ontario Parks. It is located approximately 6 kilometres (3.7 mi) north of Cloyne. The park is within township boundaries of both North Frontenac and Addington Highlands, roughly separated by Highway 41. The park gets approximately 180,000 visitors annually and is a popular tourist attraction among Canadians.

Bon Echo features several lakes, including Bon Echo Lake; Joeperry Lake, along Rainey Creek; and part of Mazinaw Lake, the seventh-deepest lake in Ontario. The southeastern shore of Mazinaw Lake features the massive 100-metre-high (330 ft) Mazinaw Rock, an escarpment rising out of the water, adorned with many native pictographs.

Nanabozho, a trickster from Ojibwe legend and cultural hero is the unofficial mascot of Bon Echo Park. He is featured prominently in pictographs adorning the sides of the rock escarpment on Mazinaw Lake. The site of the Mazinaw pictographs was designated a National Historic Site of Canada in 1982.

== History ==
The Bon Echo region – after enterprising lumbering companies came and went, along with the farming communities that accompanied them – was purchased in 1889 by Weston A. Price and his wife, who were inspired by Mazinaw Rock and the surrounding area. They named the area "Bon Echo" because of the acoustical properties of the Rock, which bounced sound across Mazinaw Lake. The Prices built a large hotel at the narrows, the Bon Echo Inn, which catered to the wealthy who were looking for a healthful retreat. Price banned alcohol on the premises due to strong religious beliefs and the Inn attracted primarily people who shared the Prices' beliefs. The hotel was also populated by a contingent of Methodist pastors, and attendance at Sunday church was required of those who stayed there.

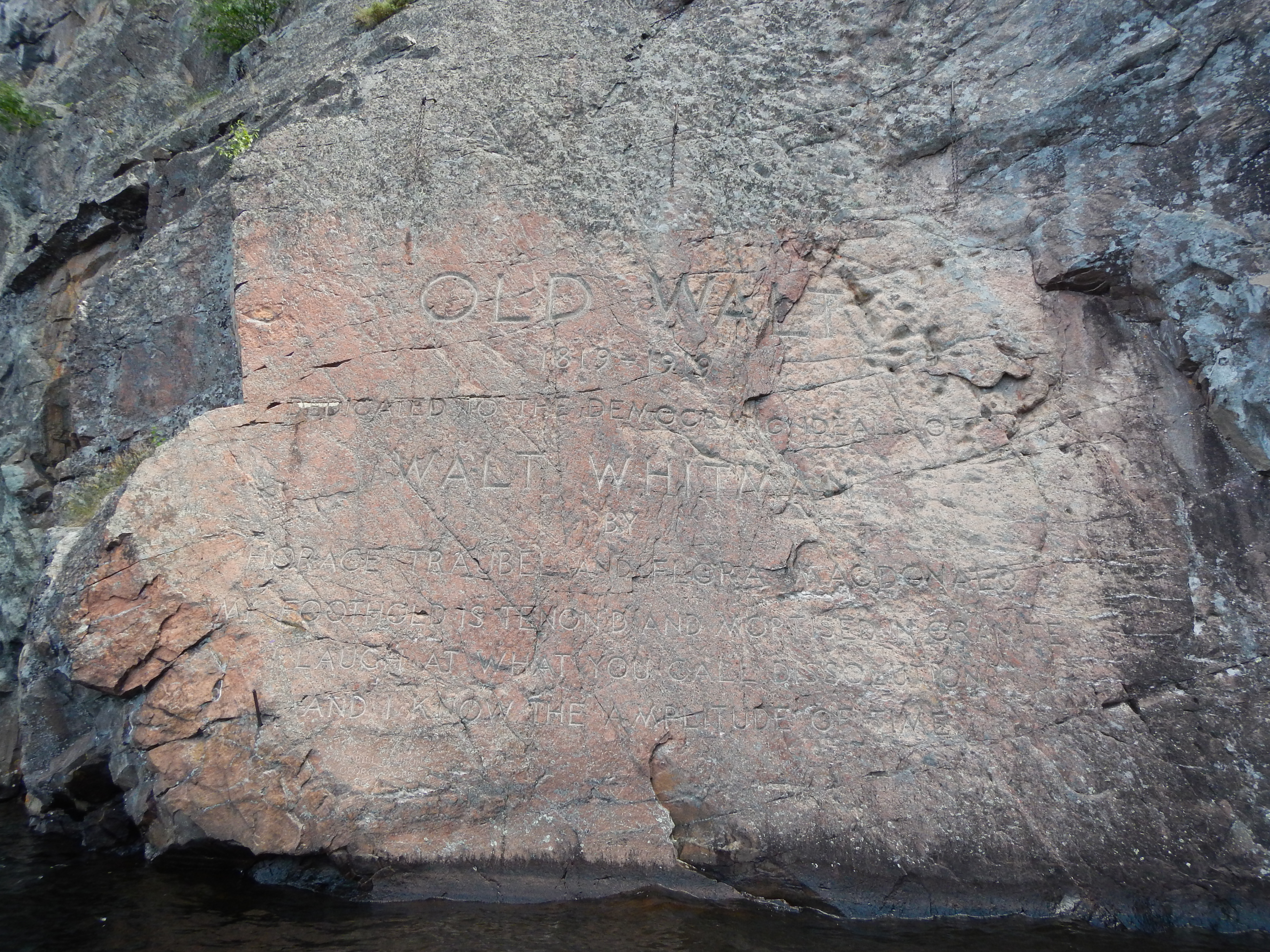
OLD WALT carving as it appears on July 24, 2014, almost 95 years after completion.

After several successful years at the Inn, a personal tragedy compelled Dr. Price to sell his holdings at Bon Echo. He found buyers in Howard and Flora MacDonald Denison. Flora was both a successful business operator in Toronto and a vocal proponent of women's rights who founded, along with other feminists, the Canadian Suffrage Association. Years earlier the Denisons had attempted to purchase a cottage from Price, but instead had settled for a lot south of the Inn when Price was reluctant to sell to them. After obtaining the property for $15,000, they sent away the pastors and turned Bon Echo Inn into a haven for artists, poets, and writers, most notably James Thurber and members of the Group of Seven.

Although Walt Whitman had never visited Bon Echo, Flora admired Whitman's work so much that she commissioned a piece of his poetry to be chiseled into the face of the rock in foot-tall lettering, where it can still be seen. The work was performed by two Aberdeen, Scotland stonemasons and took all of the summer of 1919 to complete.

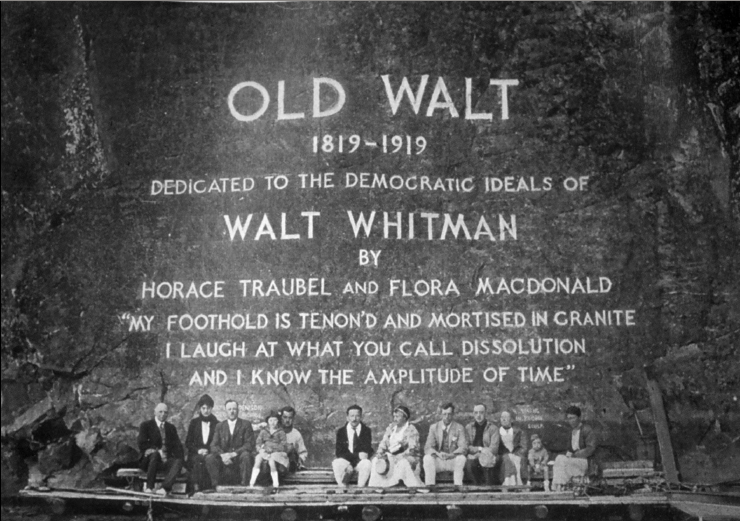
Flora MacDonald Denison (owner of the property) is under the "P" in "amplitude". Her son Merrill Denison is under "know".

After her death in 1921, the land and inn was inherited by Merrill Denison, her son and a very successful entrepreneur. He continued to operate the inn until the beginning of the Great Depression in 1929 along with his first wife, Muriel Denison, an author whose works include the "Susannah" series (Susannah of the Mounties, et al.), made famous by the Shirley Temple film adaptions. After that, the inn was leased to the Leavens Brothers who operated it as a summer hotel, and other portions of the property were rented out for use as a boys' camp and other recreational purposes. In 1936, the inn and many outbuildings were destroyed in a fire started by lightning striking the bakehouse. The loss was not fully covered by insurance, and the inn was never rebuilt.

Merrill Denison continued to spend summers at Bon Echo, using it as a quiet location to write. Some of the cottages, including Dollywood and Greystones, remained in use as summer getaways for years, but financially the property was often a burden on the Denisons. In 1955, the Province of Ontario passed legislation allowing them to accept donations of land to form provincial parks. Although he could have made a substantial profit dividing and selling sections of the property as building lots, Denison's interests in conservation led him to donate the land to the province for the purpose of forming a park in 1959.

In 1965, Bon Echo Provincial Park officially opened. A plaque was placed at The Narrows, dedicating the park to Flora MacDonald Denison and Muriel Denison.

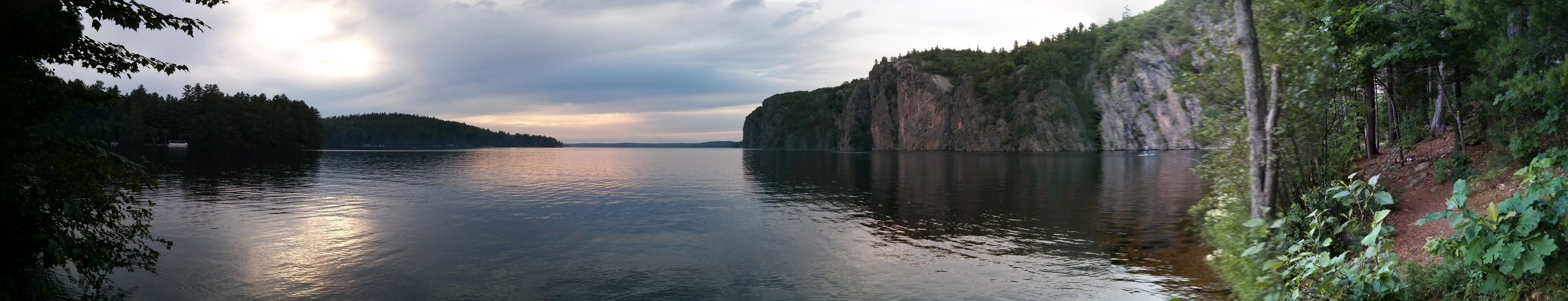
Upper Mazinaw Lake facing Mazinaw Rock from The Narrows, looking North.

== Recreation ==
=== Rock climbing ===
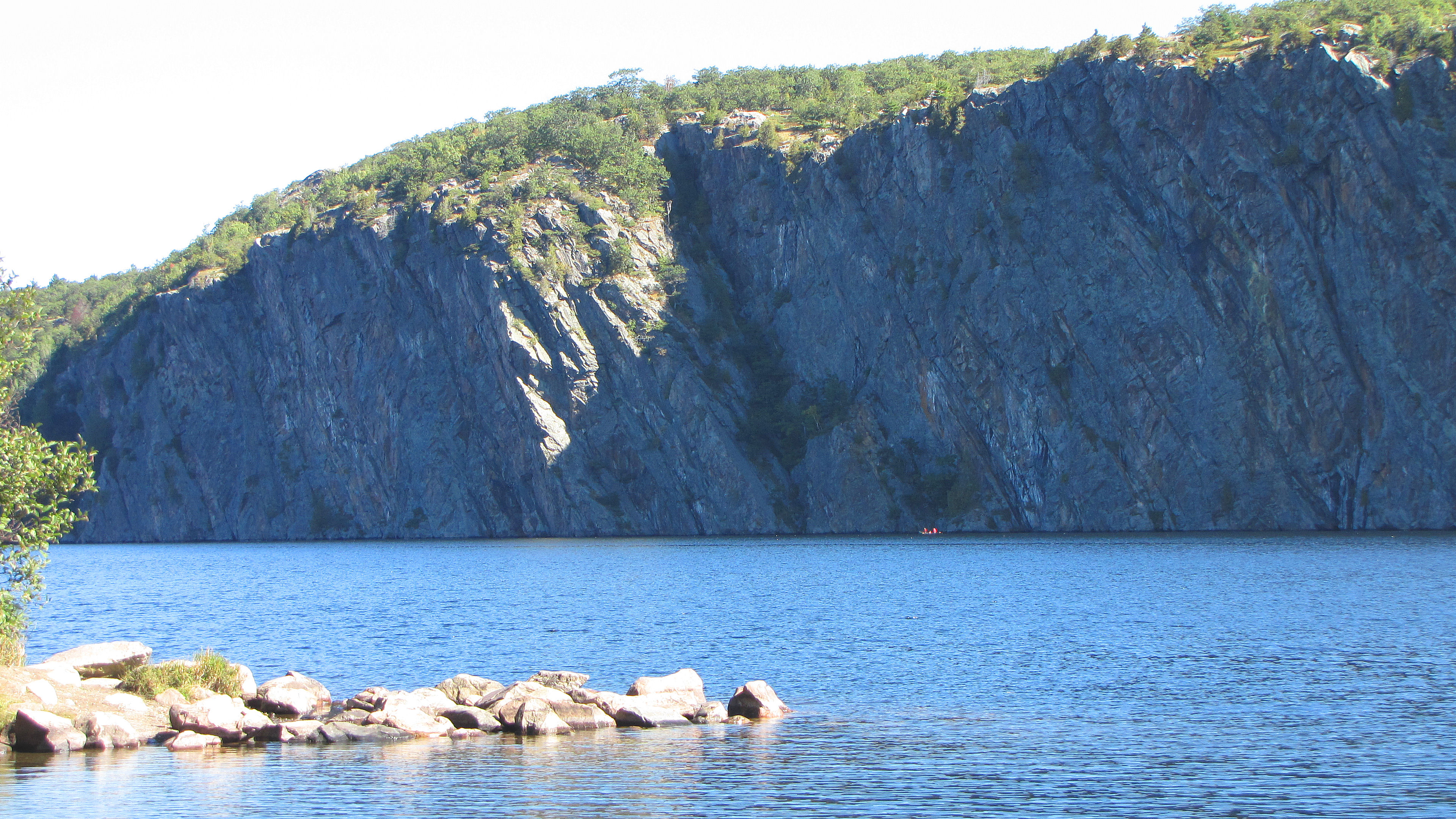
Mazinaw Rock, Upper Mazinaw Lake, notice canoers near base of rock

In 1956, Kay McCormick, Marnie Gilmour, David Fisher and Alan Bruce-Robertson paddled across Mazinaw Lake in a canoe on the Saturday of the Labour Day weekend, and climbed a rock outcropping subsequently named Birthday Ridge. On Sunday (Marnie's birthday), they climbed Front of the Pinnacle. This marked the first rock climbing on Mazinaw Rock. The Alpine Club of Canada maintains a hut on the lake, and Bon Echo rock climbing remains core to the ACC's Toronto Section to this day.

=== Camping, hiking, boating and swimming ===
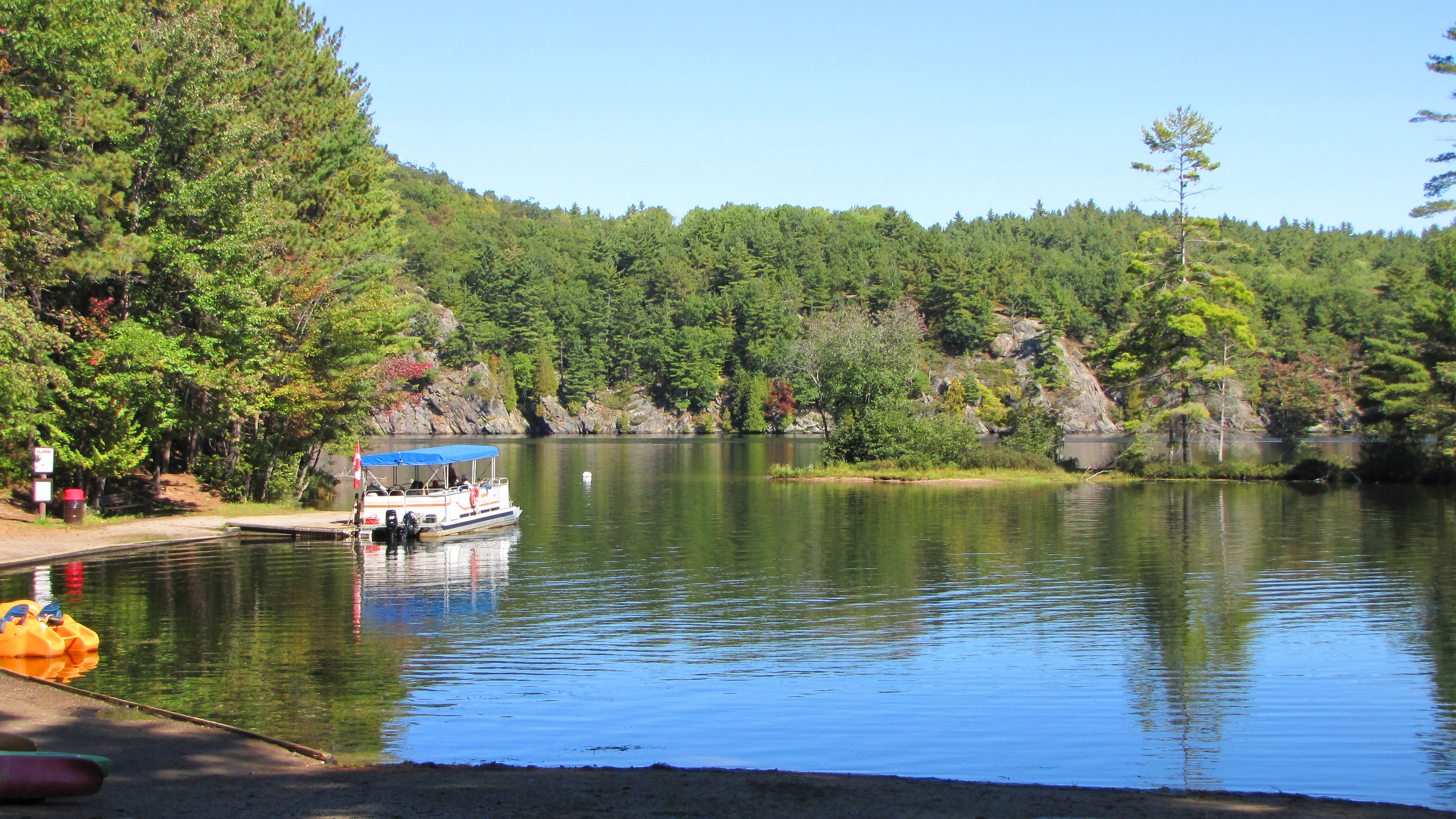
Lagoon, ferry, and boat launch near narrows between Upper and Lower Mazinaw Lake

Bon Echo's 400+ campsites in the Mazinaw and Hardwood Hills campgrounds are typical of those in the Ontario Parks system. Grassy or lightly wooded lots are set back from unpaved access roads and are backed by natural, untended land, which is generally conifer-deciduous forest. Both campgrounds host a number of RV-accessible lots. Electricity is also available to 130 campsites. All sites are located close to a source of running water, as well as a latrine or flush toilet. Comfort stations with washrooms, showers, and laundry facilities are available in each campground area. There are also radio-free areas, a visitor centre, and a gift shop/café.

In addition, accommodation in heated yurts is available in the Sawmill Bay camping area, as well as a number of cabins, most of which are located on Bon Echo Lake, west of Highway 41. The yurts and cabins are an alternative to tenting or RVs, accommodating up to 5 or 6 and providing a more protected environment for less hardy visitors.

Cutting and collecting firewood is prohibited on these sites to prevent environmental disturbances or damage. Firewood must be purchased at camp offices. Due to the emerald ash borer and other invasive species, moving firewood from regulated areas to non-regulated areas is not permitted without a movement certificate from the CFIA.

Bon Echo also offers backcountry camping along the Abes and Essens Trail. This trail in the northern reaches of the park hosts five campsites, each equipped with a picnic table, stone firepit, and dedicated outdoor box privy ("thunderbox"). Unlike other areas of the park, none of these sites have access to treated water, electricity, or any other park service. Disturbing these sites is also discouraged, although the collecting of fallen deadwood for a campfire is tolerated if done carefully.

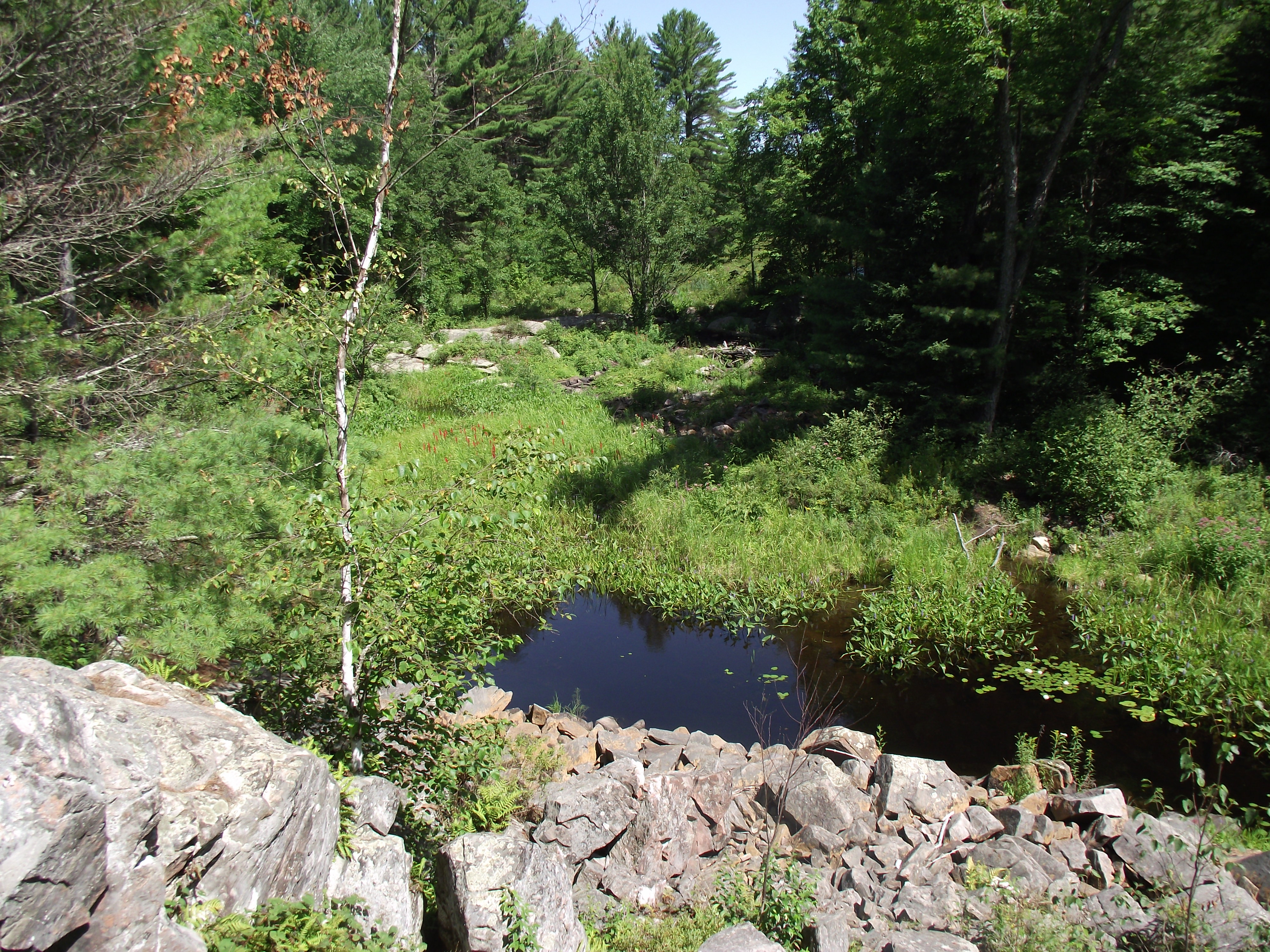
Stream feeding Essens Lake from the north on the 2nd Loop of the Abes and Essens Trail

Augmenting the ruggedness of the experience, Abes and Essens is regarded as a strenuous trail. The terrain is, in places, very rough and uneven, often with shield rock jutting up as on the Bruce Trail. Depending on the loops and paths one takes, the hike will take between 2 and 7 hours. The trail features three loops of 4 km (2.5 mi), 9 km (5.6 mi) and 17 km (11 mi), which intersect at various points, allowing navigation of the trail in many ways. The paths are not bold, preserving the ecology of the trail, and can be confusing at times, although the way is marked by flags on particularly difficult sections. Due to the length and difficulty of the trail, it is not recommended for the ill-prepared (or overpacked) camper, nor the unfit or inexperienced day-hiker.

Other, less strenuous hiking trails include the Shield Trail and the High Pines Trail, as well as the Clifftop Trail that leads up along the top of the Mazinaw Rock, providing views from its designated viewing areas above the narrows of Mazinaw Lake.

It is also possible to rent self-propelled water craft to explore the lakes and waterways of the park.

Bon Echo Provincial Park has beaches along Mazinaw Lake, including North Beach (at the southern end of Upper Mazinaw Lake), Main Beach and South Beach (both at the northern end of Lower Mazinaw Lake). The beach waters are generally at their warmest in August, and swimmer's itch is not uncommon.

== Facilities ==
=== Climbing hut ===
44°56′28″N 77°12′20″W

The Toronto chapter of the Alpine Club of Canada maintains a climbing hut as a base for climbing activities in the park. This is a day-use hut with no sleeping facilities. It is equipped with propane-powered lamps and stovetops and a wood-burning fireplace for heating and drying clothes. There are numerous tent sites on the property for use by Alpine Club members and guests during summer weekends. Unlike most other alpine huts managed by the Alpine Club, the ACC owns the land on which the hut is built. The hut can be reached by boat from the park's dock on Mazinaw Lake.

== Natural history ==
Several of the lakes on the Abes and Essens trail are stone-bottomed, hewn by glacial procession. They are relatively free of detritus and sand, and as such, the water is clear and cold. Consequently, these lakes are relatively devoid of fish and plant species found elsewhere throughout the park. Small fish can be observed, but generally only closer to the shores of these lakes, or clustered around the islands found therein.

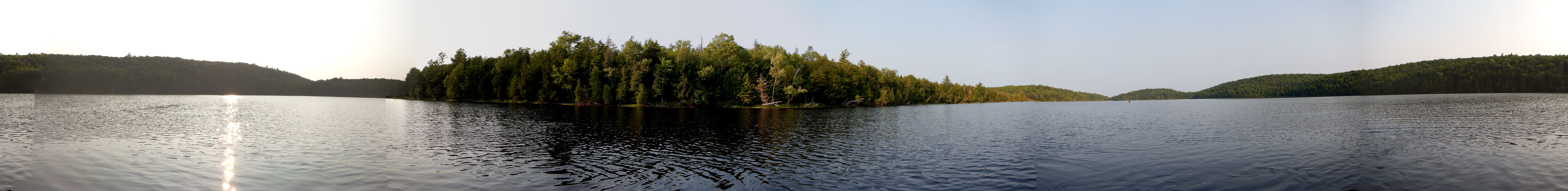
An almost completely isolated lake, Kishkebus Lake, at Bon Echo Provincial Park, but for a small waterfall at the south-east draining into Shabomeka Lake.

In most lakes, lake trout, yellow pickerel, smallmouth and largemouth bass, lake whitefish, and northern pike can all be found. Additionally, in the more secluded areas one may see white-tailed deer, moose, black bear, red fox, beaver, and raccoons. Commonly seen mammals include eastern cottontail rabbits, eastern chipmunks, red squirrels, gray squirrels, and voles. It also hosts Ontario's only lizard, the five-lined skink.
