= Bon Echo =

Bon Echo may refer to:

- The development name for Firefox 2
- Bon Echo Provincial Park in Ontario, Canada
