= Susannah of the Mounties (film) =

1939 film directed by William A. Seiter

- Theatrical release poster
- Directed by: William A. Seiter
- Screenplay by: Robert Ellis; Helen Logan
- Story by: Fidel LaBarba (as Fidel La Barba); Walter Ferris
- Based on: Susannah of the Mounties; 1936 novel by Muriel Denison
- Produced by: Kenneth Macgowan
- Starring: Shirley Temple; Randolph Scott; Margaret Lockwood
- Cinematography: Arthur C. Miller
- Edited by: Robert Bischoff
- Production company: 20th Century Fox
- Distributed by: 20th Century Fox
- Release date: June 23, 1939
- Running time: 79 minutes
- Country: United States
- Language: English

Susannah of the Mounties is a 1939 American Western film directed by William A. Seiter and starring Shirley Temple, Randolph Scott, and Margaret Lockwood. Based on the 1936 novel Susannah of the Mounties by Muriel Denison, the film is about an orphaned survivor of an Indian attack in the Canadian West who is taken in by a Mountie and his girlfriend. Following additional Indian attacks, the Mountie is saved from the stake by the young girl's intervention with the Indian chief.

The plot differs significantly from the book in that it is set twenty years earlier at a much smaller Mounted Police fort and Susannah's parents are dead rather than in India.

== Plot ==
As the Canadian Pacific Railway makes its way through the western frontier of Canada in the early 1880s, railroad workers and settlers come under frequent attack by Indians who resent the white man's encroachment on their land. One such attack on a wagon train leaves only one survivor, a young girl named Susannah Sheldon who is found by a mounted patrol in the command of Inspector Angus "Monty" Montague. Susannah is taken to the post where she is cared for by Monty and his friend, Pat O'Hannegan. They do their best to help her overcome her ordeal.

Some time later, Vicky Standing arrives from Toronto to visit her father, the Superintendent. Monty is immediately enchanted by the beautiful woman. The blossoming romance sparks a rivalry in Susannah and Harlan Chambers, the head of the railroad camp. The Indian attacks resume when renegades steal horses from the railroad camp. One of the friendly Indians, Chief Big Eagle, promises to track down the renegades and deliver them to the camp. As a show of good faith, the Chief leaves his son, Little Chief, at the post.

Little Chief teaches Susannah Indian ways. While the two are out riding, they run into a renegade, Wolf Pelt, attempting to sell his stolen horses to Chambers. The two argue and Chambers threatens the Indians with extinction. Wolf Pelt returns to his tribe and uses Chambers' threats to demand that the tribe go to war against the Europeans. That night, Wolf Pelt raids the post to retrieve Little Chief and kidnaps Monty. Soon after, Big Eagle sends a message demanding that the railroad abandon the area or they will kill Monty.

Susannah searches for Monty; she approaches the Indian camp, she is taken prisoner. As the tribe prepares to burn Monty at the stake, Susannah escapes the teepee and appeals to Big Chief, accusing Wolf Pelt of inciting Chambers by stealing his horses. Wolf Pelt denies the charges. To determine who is telling the truth, Big Chief uses the stick of truth that will point to the liar. When the stick drops towards Wolf Pelt, Big Chief frees Monty and offers him and Susannah his peace pipe.

== Cast ==
- Shirley Temple as Susannah Sheldon
- Randolph Scott as Monty - Inspector Angus Montague
- Margaret Lockwood as Vicky Standing
- Martin Good Rider as Little Chief
- J. Farrell MacDonald as Pat O'Hannegan
- Maurice Moscovitch as Chief Big Eagle (as Maurice Moscovich)
- Moroni Olsen as Supt. Andrew Standing
- Victor Jory as Wolf Pelt
- Lester Matthews as Harlan Chambers
- Leyland Hodgson as Randall
- Herbert Evans as Doctor
- Jack Luden as Williams
- Charles Irwin as Sergeant MacGregor
- John Sutton as Corporal Piggott

== Production ==
The film was announced in June 1937. Production was pushed back. Shooting started 23 January 1939. Walter Lang was meant to direct but he fell ill and was replaced by William Seiter.

Margaret Lockwood made the film during her brief stint in Los Angeles.

In the film there was a contingent of 12 full blooded Blackfoot Indians led by Chief Albert Mad Plume, who were brought in largely as extras. Another member of the Blackfoot tribe, Martin Goodrider, played the role of Little Chief. Temple and Goodrider struck up an instant friendship (something unusual with Temple as she was normally forbidden to mingle with her child costars). As an act of goodwill, Temple swore in all members of the Blackfoot tribe as members of the Shirley Temple Police Force while Temple was made an honorary member of the Blackfoot tribe and given the name Bright Shining Star.

== Soundtrack ==
The Maple Leaf Forever (Alexander Muir) played during opening titles

- "In the Gloaming" (Annie Fortescue Harrison, Meta Orred) sung a cappella by soldiers in Supt. Standing's home
- "I'll Teach You to Waltz" (M. F. Carrey) played on harmonica by J. Farrell MacDonald and sung by Shirley Temple
- "Down Went McGinty" (Joseph Flynn) sung a cappella by J. Farrell MacDonald

== See also ==
- List of American films of 1939
