= Mazinaw Rock =

Cliffs in Ontario, Canada

Coordinates: 44°54′00″N 77°11′00″W

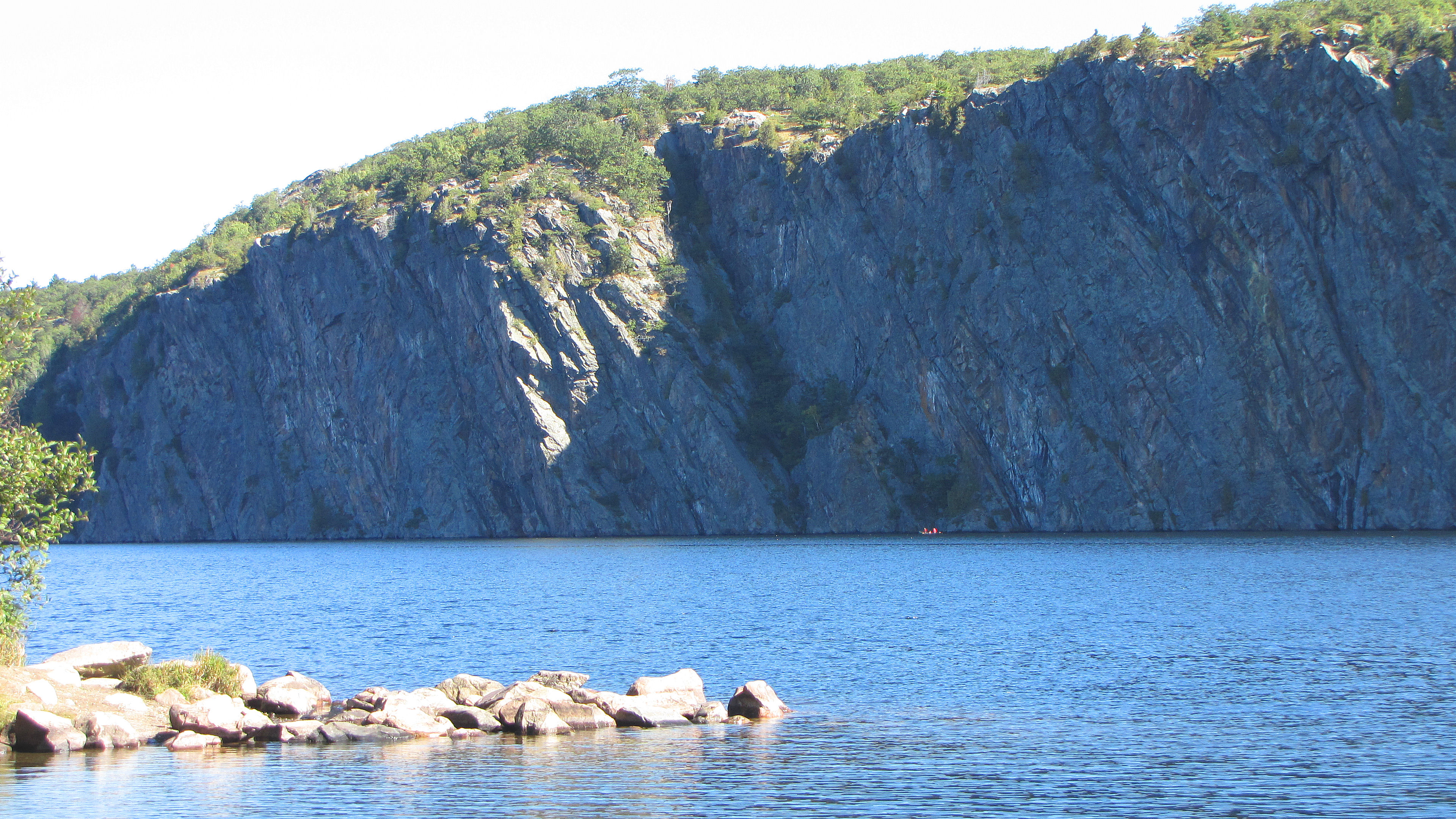
Mazinaw Rock on Mazinaw Lake

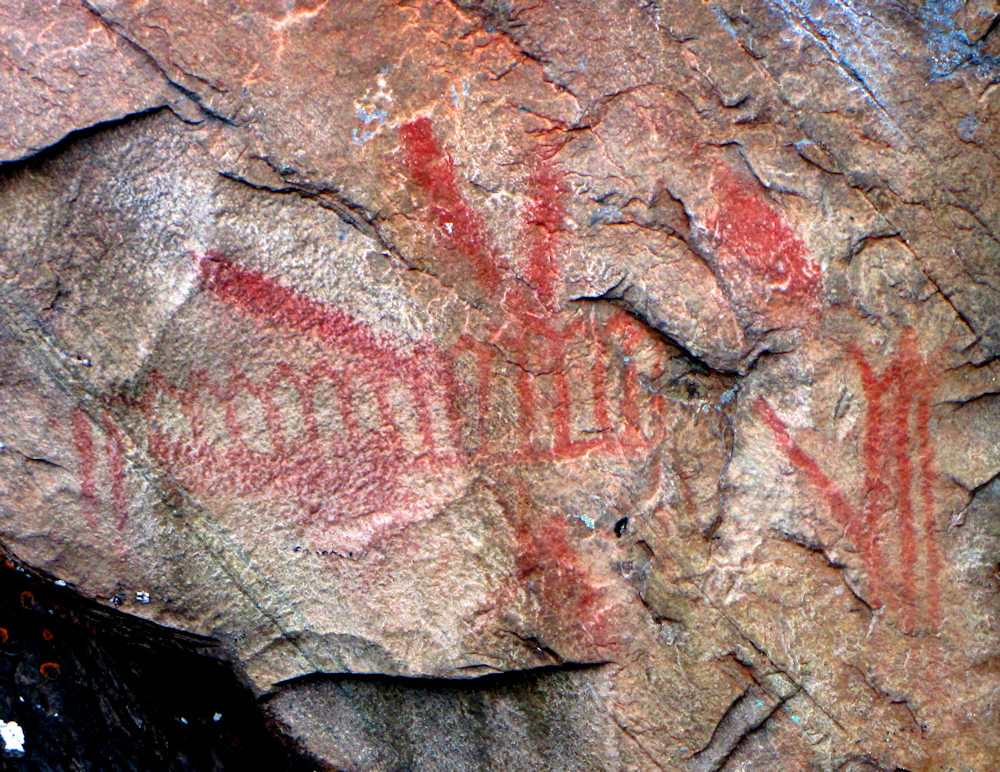
Pictographs on Mazinaw Rock

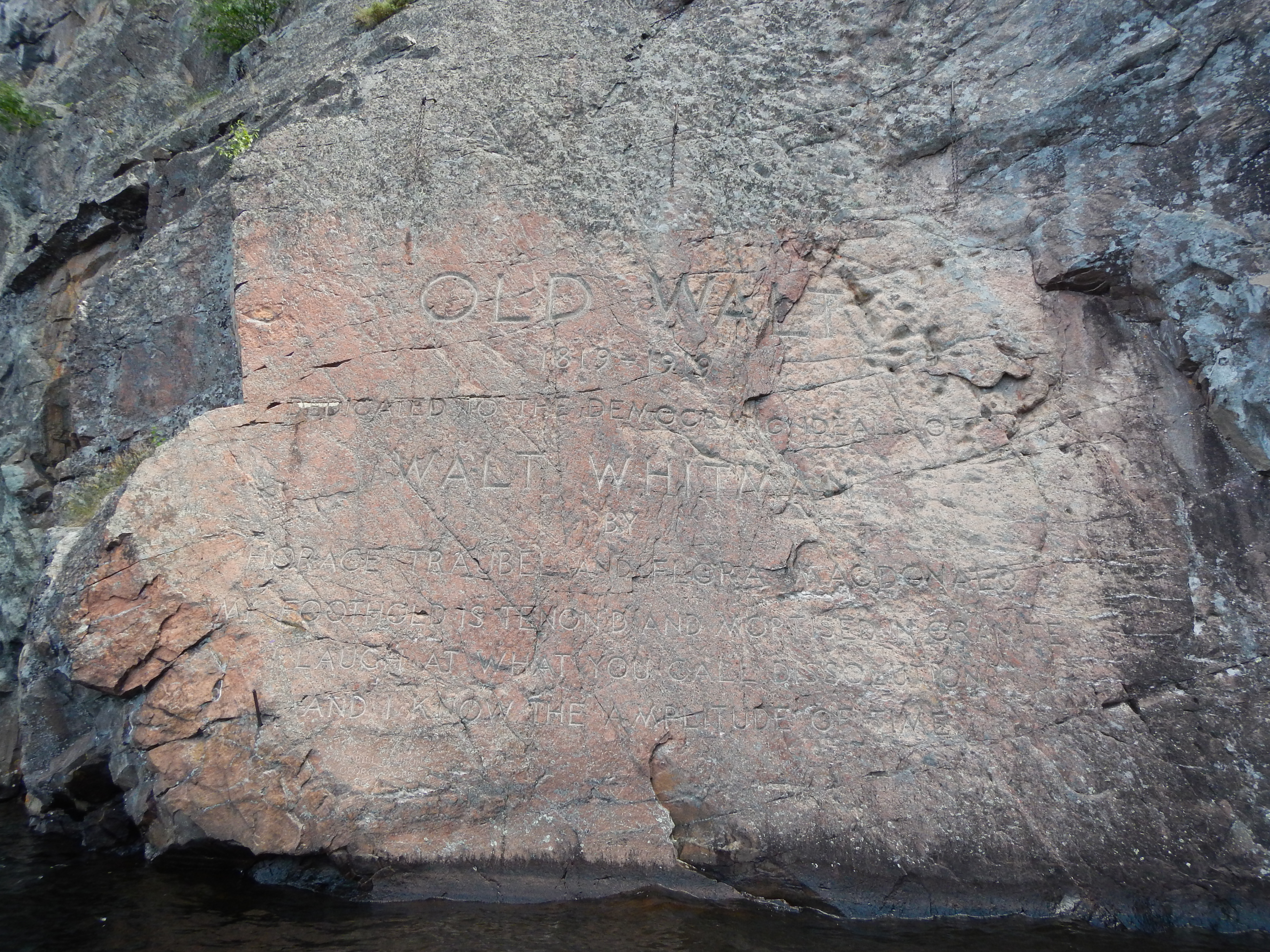
'Old Walt' text carved into Mazinaw Rock for Walt Whitman (Clear text here)

Mazinaw Rock is a 100-metre (330 ft) high cliff in the Addington Highlands, 30 kilometres (18.6 mi) north of Kaladar, with the closest settlement being Cloyne in south-central Ontario, Canada. It stretches for 1.5 kilometres (0.9 mi) along Mazinaw Lake, and is a landmark in the Bon Echo Provincial Park that draws the attention of many campers and cottagers all over Canada. The lake's depth reaches 145 metres (476 ft), making it the third deepest lake in Ontario besides the Great Lakes. The rock is composed of granite and black dykes. The quality of the rock varies from good on the more popular routes to bad on the less used routes.

The rock is credited in giving the name to Bon Echo Provincial Park, because it is responsible for the large echo that is unmistakable during thunderstorms and fireworks displays. Bon Echo is French for "good echo". The face of the rock is adorned with over 260 Indigenous pictographs. This gives it the largest collection of visible pictographs in Canada. Painted in red ochre on rock, they seem to depict animals—possibly creatures from Anishinābe mythology. These works may have been made by shamans, whose healing and prophetic powers are often represented in this way. Equally, they may also have served as warnings of territoriality. The pictographs are among the earliest surviving artworks in the Ottawa region.

The word Mazinaw originates from Algonkian, which means "painted rock" giving the rock its name. Near the bottom of the rock face there is also an engraved tribute to Walt Whitman, inscribed for Flora MacDonald Denison, who ran the inn in the provincial park during the 1910s.

== Tourist attractions ==
Mazinaw Rock is a notable tourist destination. Tourists can canoe or kayak around the face of the rock. A rock climbing service is also available from The Alpine Club of Canada which ferries climbers to the bottom of the rock face, they then climb directly onto the rock from the boat and begin their climb to be picked up when finished. The Cliff Top Trail allows people to hike to the top of Mazinaw Rock for a view of the lake and the surrounding area.
