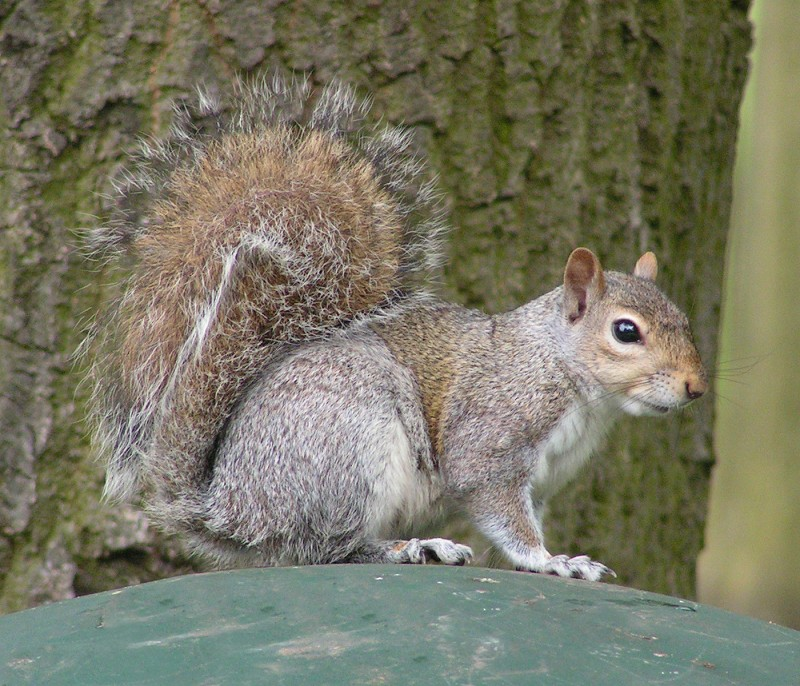
- Eastern gray squirrel (Sciurus carolinensis)

Scientific classification
- Kingdom: Animalia
- Phylum: Chordata
- Class: Mammalia
- Order: Rodentia
- Family: Sciuridae
- Subfamily: Sciurinae
- Tribe: Sciurini; G. Fischer, 1817

Type genus
- Sciurus Linnaeus, 1758

Genera
- ?Douglassciurus (extinct); ?Freudenthalia (extinct); Microsciurus; Miosciurus (extinct); Plesiosciurus (extinct); Rheithrosciurus; Sciurus; Syntheosciurus; Tamiasciurus

Diversity
- Five living genera and about forty species.

= Sciurini =

Sciurini Temporal range: Late Eocene–present

Tribe of rodents

Sciurini (/sɪˈjuːrɪniː/) is a tribe that includes about forty species of squirrels, mostly from the Americas. It includes five living genera—the American dwarf squirrels, Microsciurus; the Bornean Rheithrosciurus; the widespread American and Eurasian tree squirrels of the genus Sciurus, which includes some of the best known squirrel species; the Central American Syntheosciurus; and the American pine squirrels, Tamiasciurus. Like other arboreal squirrels, they are sometimes referred to as tree squirrels.

== Taxonomy ==
The name "Sciurini" was first employed by Hermann Burmeister in 1854, who used it for the entire squirrel family. In his influential 1945 classification of mammals, George Gaylord Simpson included four genera of squirrels in Sciurini, which he recognized as one of eight tribes within the subfamily Sciurinae (including all squirrels except the flying squirrels): Sciurus, Syntheosciurus, Microsciurus, and Sciurillus. He also classified Rheithrosciurus as "?Sciurini incertae sedis" (of uncertain placement). This grouping derives from Reginald Innes Pocock, who united these squirrels in 1923 as the subfamily Sciurinae.

In 1959, Joseph Curtis Moore published a review of the interrelationships of the squirrels. His definition of Sciurini was similar to Simpson's, but he no longer considered Rheithrosciurus to be incertae sedis. He noted that the members of Sciurini were united only by the possession of a special type of baculum (penis bone). He also divided the tribe into subtribes, producing the following classification:

- Tribe Sciurini
  - Subtribe Sciurina
    - Genus Sciurus
    - Genus Guerlinguetus (currently included in Sciurus)
    - Genus Rheithrosciurus
  - Subtribe Microsciurina
    - Genus Microsciurus
    - Genus Syntheosciurus
  - Subtribe Sciurillina
    - Genus Sciurillus

In their 1997 update to Simpson's classification, McKenna and Bell retained a similar definition for Sciurini, but also included several extinct genera, as follows:

- Tribe Sciurini
  - Freudenthalia (fossil, early Miocene of Europe; assignment to Sciurini "uncertain")
  - Rheithrosciurus
  - Plesiosciurus (fossil, middle Miocene of Asia)
  - Subtribe Sciurina
    - Douglassciurus (fossil, late Eocene of North America; McKenna and Bell used Douglassia, a preoccupied name replaced by Douglassciurus)
    - Protosciurus (fossil, early Oligocene to early Miocene of North America)
    - Miosciurus (fossil, early Miocene of North America)
    - Sciurus (including Syntheosciurus)
    - Microsciurus
  - Subtribe Sciurillina
    - Sciurillus

- Sciuridae
  - Sciurillus
  - Ratufa
  - - Callosciurinae
    - Xerinae
    - Sciurinae
      - Pteromyini
      - Sciurini
        - Tamiasciurus
        - Sciurus (Note: Syntheosciurus, Rheithrosciurus, and Microsciurus appear among the species of Sciurus.)

Phylogeny of the squirrels.

In the early 2000s, several studies were published using DNA sequences to study the interrelationships of squirrels. Two, published in 2003 and 2004 and both based on several different genes, produced largely concordant results, concluding that Sciurillus is not related to other Sciurini, but rather forms one of the most distinctive lineages of all squirrels; that Tamiasciurus is the closest relative to the other Sciurini; and that the group of Tamiasciurus and the other Sciurini is most closely related to the flying squirrels. The authors of the 2004 study formalized these results into a revised classification of squirrels. They removed Sciurillus from Sciurini, placed Tamiasciurus in it, and classified Sciurini with the flying squirrels (tribe Pteromyini) in a subfamily Sciurinae. Their classification was adopted in the 2005 third edition of Mammal Species of the World and remains current.

The same studies also provided insights into the interrelationships of genera within Sciurini. Microsciurus, Syntheosciurus, and Rheithrosciurus all appear among the various species of Sciurus included, making the latter genus paraphyletic; additionally, the two species of Microsciurus included in Mercer and Roth's 2003 study did not cluster with each other. A morphological study of Central American Sciurini also found that Microsciurus and Syntheosciurus are part of the Sciurus radiation, and suggested that Syntheosciurus be lumped into Sciurus while further work is needed on Microsciurus. In a 2008 monograph on Brazilian rodents, Bonvicino and others considered Guerlinguetus and Urosciurus, conventionally placed in Sciurus, as separate genera.

=== Fossil history ===
Douglassciurus, a fossil from the late Eocene (about 36 million years ago) of Wyoming, Montana, and Saskatchewan, is so similar to living Sciurus that the latter has been considered a living fossil. but some exclude this animal from the squirrel family because of several primitive characters. Emry and Korth, who re-described the animal in 1996, classified it within Sciurini and speculated that other squirrels may have evolved from animals similar to Sciurini squirrels. The Oligocene to early Miocene North American genera Protosciurus and Miosciurus are classified in Sciurini and may have given rise to the earliest known member of Sciurus, S. olsoni from the early late Miocene (about 10 million years ago) of Nevada. In Europe, Sciurus first appears early in the Pliocene. The 2005 discovery of S. olsoni provided evidence that the origin of the Sciurini lies in North America.

A Miocene squirrel from France and Spain, Freudenthalia, has been tentatively placed in Sciurini. Plesiosciurus from the Miocene of China has been interpreted as a member of Sciurini, but is unlikely to belong to the tribe.
