= Bangs's mountain squirrel =

Conservation status
- Data Deficient (IUCN 3.1)

Scientific classification
- Kingdom: Animalia
- Phylum: Chordata
- Class: Mammalia
- Order: Rodentia
- Family: Sciuridae
- Subfamily: Sciurinae
- Tribe: Sciurini
- Genus: Syntheosciurus; Bangs, 1902
- Species: S. brochus

Binomial name
- Syntheosciurus brochus Bangs, 1902

Species of rodent

Bangs's mountain squirrel (Syntheosciurus brochus) is a poorly known species of tree squirrel, that only lives in Costa Rica and Panama. It can be found in mountain rain forests at an altitude between 1,900 and 2,600 metres (6,200 and 8,500 ft), and lives mainly in the tree tops, but sometimes on the forest floor as well. One of its habitats is at the summit of the Poás Volcano in Costa Rica, in a Clusia forest that is almost inaccessible to humans.

== Description ==
The squirrel's head and body measure 15 centimetres (5.9 in), with a 13 centimetres (5.1 in) tail. It has an olive brown back and an orange-red belly. Because of the shape of its skull and teeth, the species has been separated from the genus of typical tree squirrels, Sciurus, into its own (monotypical) genus Syntheosciurus.

== Recent discovery ==
Until the 1980s, only four animals of this species were known. Since then, the species has been studied more in depth, especially by the zoologists N.M.Wells and J.Giacalone, who write that these mountain squirrels are sociable creatures. These squirrels live in pairs, together with their young, in a tree nest at a height of 6 to 12 metres (20–39 ft).
