= Merrill Denison =

Canadian playwright (1893–1975)

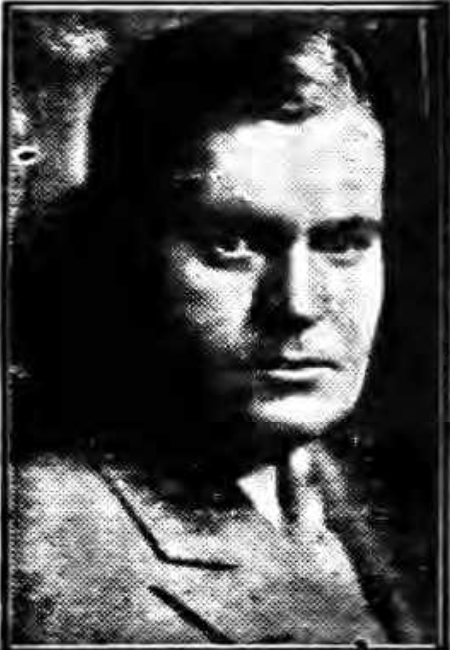
- Born: 23 June 1893; Detroit, Michigan, U.S.
- Died: 12 June 1975 (aged 81); San Diego, California, U.S.
- Education: University of Toronto
- Occupation: Playwright
- Spouse: Muriel Goggin (m. 1926; died 1954)
- Relatives: Flora MacDonald Denison (mother)
- Writing career
- Period: 1921–1967

Merrill Denison (23 June 1893 — 13 June 1975) was a Canadian playwright. He created many dramas which were broadcast during the early days of radio, and was the art director of Hart House Theatre, Toronto, Ontario.

== Early life ==
Denison was born in Detroit and raised in Ontario, the son of Canadian author, dressmaker, theosophist, Whitmanite, and feminist Flora MacDonald (Merrill) Denison and American garment salesman Howard Denison. He studied architecture at Columbia University, then at the Ecole des Beaux Arts in Paris and finally at the University of Toronto.

== Career ==
Instead of making a career as an architect, Denison began working as the art director of Hart House Theatre in Toronto in 1921. In 1926 he married Jessie Muriel Goggin. Denison soon began to write comedies, some of which were conceived at his summer home in what would later become Bon Echo and performed in the Tweed Playhouse in Tweed, Ontario.

The Romance of Canada, a series of historical plays written by Denison, were broadcast as radio dramas in 1931 and 1932 by CNRV. During the decades that followed, he lived and worked in the United States, working on radio plays.

Increasingly interested in business history, during the 1950s and 1960s Denison wrote several histories of Canadian corporations, including Harvest Triumphant: The Story of Massey-Harris and The People's Power: the History of Ontario Hydro (1960).

== Later life and death ==
Muriel Denison died in 1954; Merrill Denison subsequently remarried and lived in Canada, with homes in Montreal and eastern Ontario. In 1959, he donated his family property to the Province of Ontario for development into Bon Echo Provincial Park. Denison died in San Diego in 1975.

== Plays ==
- The Unheroic North: Four Canadian Plays (1923)
  - Brothers in Arms, the Weather Breeder, From Their Own Place, and Marsh Hay.
- Henry Hudson and other plays: Six Plays for the Microphone (1931) from the 'Romance of Canada' series of radio broadcasts
- The Raid on Grand Pre (1931) from the 'Romance of Canada' series of radio broadcasts
- America in action: twelve one-act plays for young people, dealing with freedom and democracy. (1941)
  - The U.S. vs. Susan B. Anthony, and Haven of the Spirit.

== Books and papers ==
- The educational program (1935) - a discussion of facts and techniques in educational broadcasting
- An American father talks to his son (1939)
- Klondike Mike: An Alaskan Odyssey (1943)
- Prodigy at sixty (1943)
- Canada, our dominion neighbor (1944)
- Harvest Triumphant: the Story of Massey-Harris (1949)
- Bristles and brushes: A footnote to the story of American war production (1949)
- The Barley and the Stream: the Molson story (1955)
- The power to go: the Story of the Automotive Industry (1956)
- The People's Power: the History of Ontario Hydro (1960)
- Canada's first bank: A History of the Bank of Montreal (1966–67) (in two volumes)
