= Canadian Anti-Vivisection Society =

Canadian anti-vivisection organization

- Formation: 1921
- Founders: Marguerite Mackay, Agnes Stanley
- Dissolved: 1949
- Purpose: Anti-vivisection
- Headquarters: Toronto
- Region served: Canada

The Canadian Anti-Vivisection Society was a Canadian anti-vivisection organization that gained support in the early 20th-century. The Society aimed to eliminate the "practice of cutting, burning or crushing any living man, bird or beast for experimental purposes". The Society was the first anti-vivisection organization in Canada.

The Society was formed in July 1921 by Marguerite Mackay and Agnes Stanley in Toronto. By the second month, the Society reported that they had 40 members. Theosophist Flora MacDonald Denison and her son were present at the first meeting. Denison's sister was Agnes Stanley. The Society had strong links to the Toronto Humane Society, Theosophical Society and the anti-vaccination movement. Most of the Society's members were women who supported the suffrage movement. Notable male members were cartoonist John Wilson Bengough and Toronto physician John B. Fraser. Bengough was a vice-president of the Toronto Humane Society.

The Society's first president was Agnes Stanley. John B. Fraser, an anti-vaccinationist and germ theory denialist was the second president of the Society in the 1920s. Fraser stated that the object of the Society was to prevent cruelty to animals in any way possible and that as a physician he did not know of any benefits that vivisection of animals had given humans. The Society denounced not only animal experimentation but the practice of vaccination as cruel to the animals from whom the serums were taken. In 1923, British anti-vivisectionist Walter Hadwen lectured at Forester's Hall, Toronto for the Society.

Dora Kitto (1873–1949), Honorary Secretary founded a separate branch of the Society in Victoria, British Columbia. Kitto's branch was renamed the Humane Education and Anti-Vivisection Society, the Anti-Vivisection Society of British Columbia in 1930 and the Animal Defence and Anti-Vivisection Society of British Columbia in 1946. After Kitto's death the Society was dissolved.

== See also ==
- American Anti-Vivisection Society
