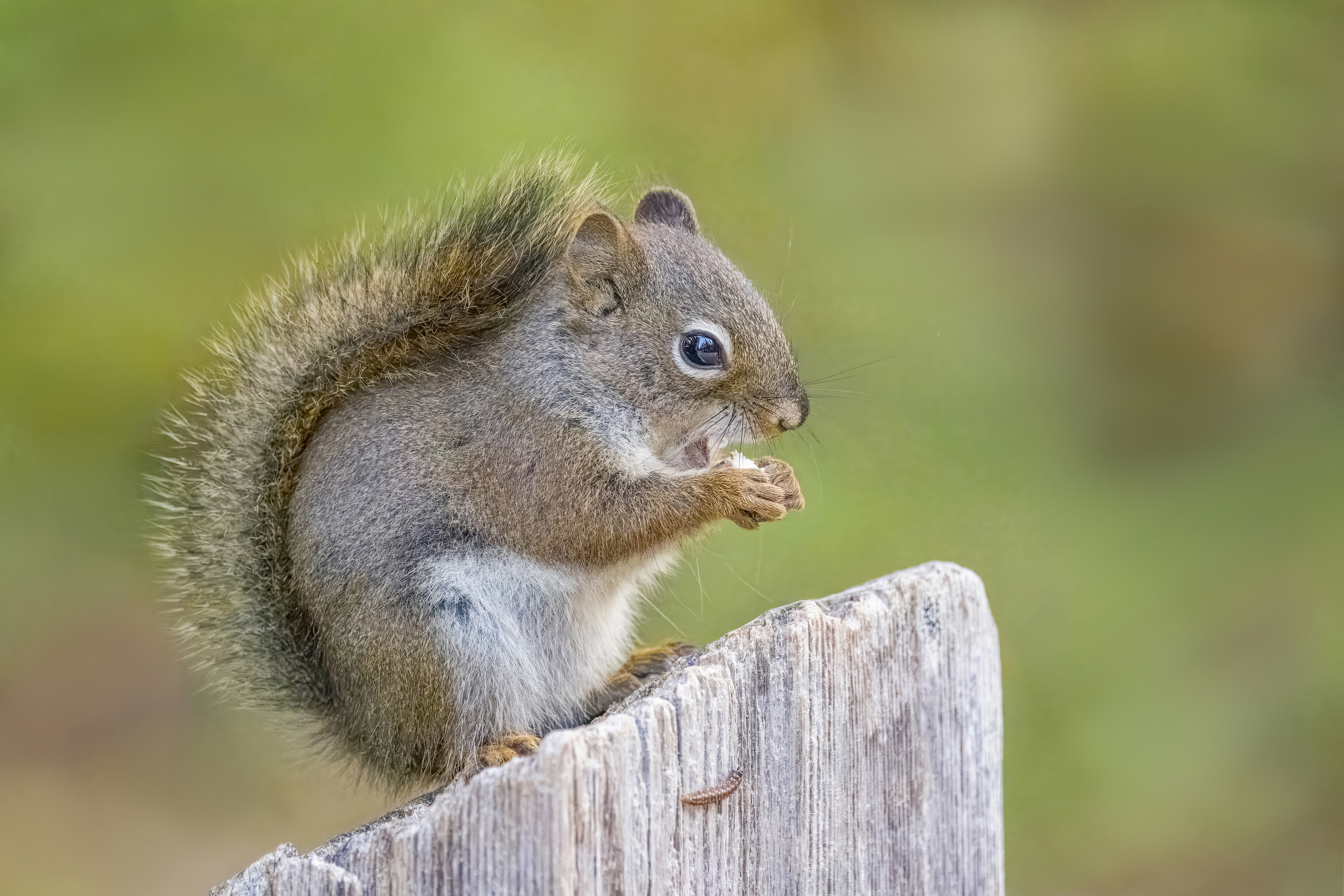
- T. h. richardsoni Moraine Lake, Banff National Park, Canada

Conservation status
- Least Concern (IUCN 3.1)

- Secure (NatureServe)

Scientific classification
- Kingdom: Animalia
- Phylum: Chordata
- Class: Mammalia
- Order: Rodentia
- Family: Sciuridae
- Genus: Tamiasciurus
- Species: T. hudsonicus

Binomial name
- Tamiasciurus hudsonicus (Erxleben, 1777)

Subspecies
- T. h. hudsonicus; T. h. abieticola; T. h. baileyi; T. h. columbiensis; T. h. dakotensis; T. h. dixiensis; T. h. gymnicus; T. h. kenaiensis; T. h. lanuginosus; T. h. laurentianus; T. h. loquax; T. h. lychnuchus; T. h. minnesota; T. h. pallescens; T. h. petulans; T. h. picatus; T. h. preblei; T. h. regalis; T. h. richardsoni; T. h. streatori; T. h. ungavensis; T. h. ventorum
- Distribution (including T. fremonti)

= American red squirrel =

Species of pine squirrel found in North America

The American red squirrel (Tamiasciurus hudsonicus) is one of three species of tree squirrels currently classified in the genus Tamiasciurus, known as the pine squirrels (the others are the Douglas squirrel, T. douglasii, and the southwestern red squirrel, T. fremonti). The American red squirrel is variously known as the pine squirrel or piney squirrel, North American red squirrel, chickaree, boomer, or simply red squirrel. The squirrel is a small, 200–250 g (7.1–8.8 oz), diurnal mammal that defends a year-round exclusive territory. It feeds primarily on the seeds of conifer cones, and is widely distributed across much of the United States and Canada wherever conifers are common, except in the southwestern United States, where it is replaced by the formerly conspecific southwestern red squirrel, and along the Pacific coast of the United States, where its cousin the Douglas squirrel is found instead.

The squirrel has been expanding its range into hardwood forests.

== Taxonomy ==
American red squirrels should not be confused with Eurasian red squirrels (Sciurus vulgaris); since the ranges of these species do not overlap, they are both commonly referred to as simply "red squirrel" in the areas where they are native. The specific epithet hudsonicus refers to Hudson Bay, Canada, where the species was first catalogued by Erxleben in 1777; accordingly, the species was formerly sometimes known as Hudson's Bay squirrel, such as in John James Audubon's work The Viviparous Quadrupeds of North America. A recent phylogeny suggests the squirrels as a family can be divided into five major lineages. Red squirrels (Tamiasciurus) fall within the clade that includes flying squirrels and other tree squirrels (e.g., Sciurus). In 1998, 25 subspecies of the American red squirrel were recognized, although some of these, including T. h. fremonti and T. h. grahamensis, are now placed in the southwestern red squirrel.

The southwestern red squirrel (T. fremonti) was long considered conspecific with T. hudsonicus, but a 2016 phylogenetic study found it to be a distinct species.

== Description ==
Red squirrels can be easily distinguished from other North American tree squirrels by their smaller size, 28–35 cm (11–14 in) total length (including tail), territorial behavior, and reddish fur with a white venter (underbelly). Red squirrels are somewhat larger than chipmunks.

The Douglas squirrel is morphologically similar to the American red squirrels, but has a rust-colored venter and is restricted to the southwestern coast of British Columbia and in the Pacific Northwest of the United States. The ranges of the American red squirrel and the Douglas squirrel overlap in southern British Columbia, northwestern Washington and eastern Oregon.

== Distribution ==
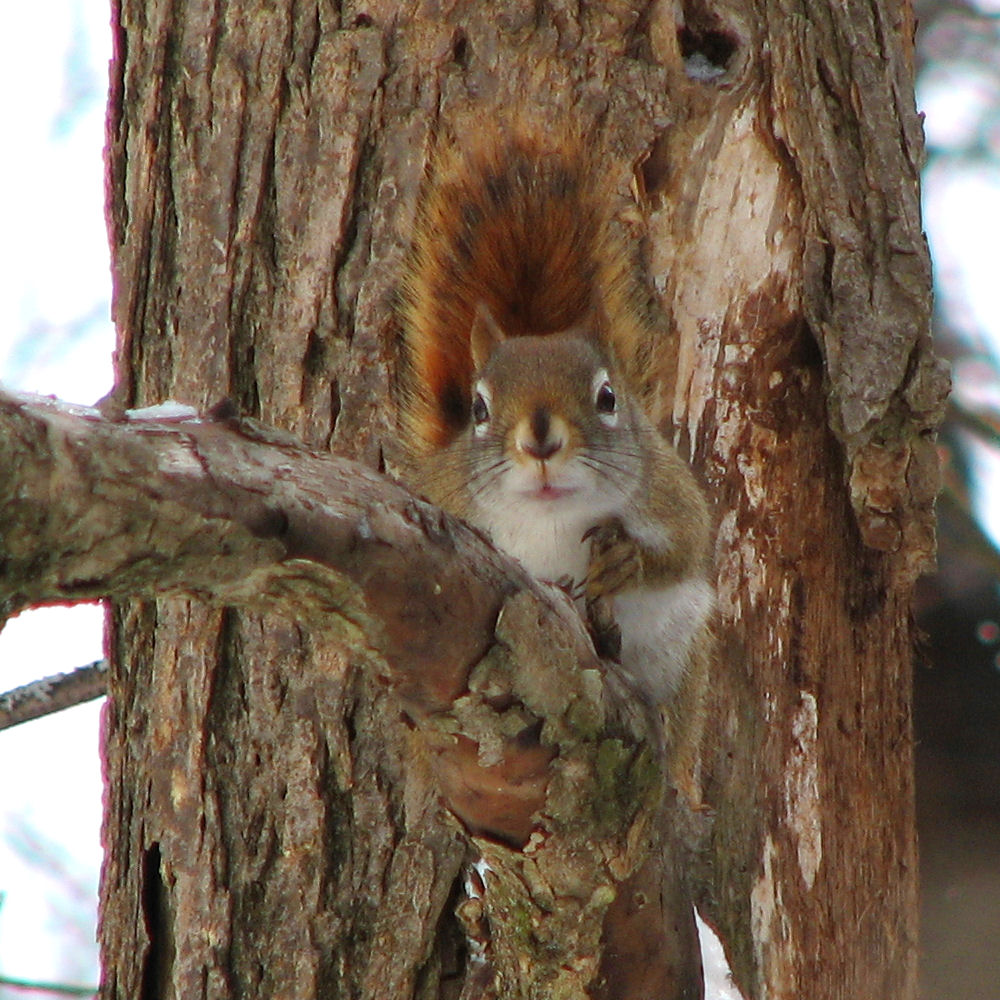
Front view, Gatineau Park, Quebec

T. h. preblei Tombstone Territorial Park, Yukon, Canada

American red squirrels are widely distributed across the North American continent. Their range includes: most of Canada, excluding northern areas with no tree cover and the southwestern coast of British Columbia; the southern half of Alaska; the Rocky Mountains area of the United States, and northern half of the eastern United States. In Alberta, where the species is associated with mature white spruce or conifer-dominated forests, it has been detected in all of the province's natural regions. American red squirrels are abundant and not of conservation concern throughout much of their range. American red squirrels were introduced on Newfoundland and have lived there in abundance for decades. The endangered subspecies T. h. grahamensis, found only on Mt. Graham, Arizona, was formerly considered a member of this species, but is now considered a subspecies of the southwestern red squirrel (Tamiasciurus fremonti).

The American red squirrel population on Vancouver Island is geographically and genetically unusual. Nuclear DNA places it within T. hudsonicus, while its mitochondrial DNA groups with the Douglas squirrel, a conflict attributed to historical hybridization, with gene flow having occurred between the island population and both mainland species. Red squirrels captured near Campbell River on Vancouver Island were introduced to Graham Island in Haida Gwaii around 1950, and the introduced population is believed to have contributed to an increase in Pacific martens on the islands.

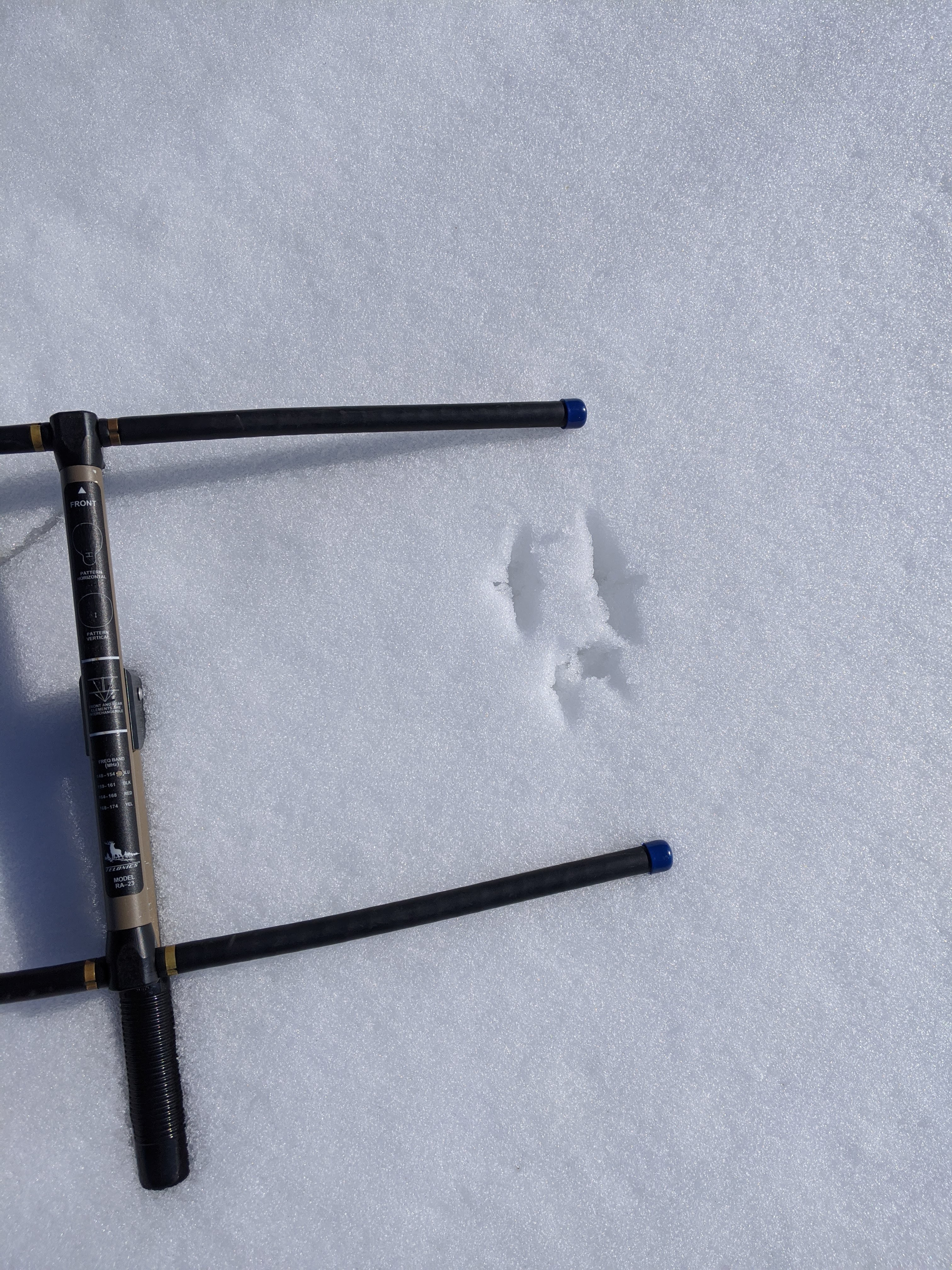
Fresh Red Squirrel tracks in snow.

== Behavior ==
=== Feeding ===
Eating a mushroom in Elk Island National Park

Video of a red squirrel eating, in Quebec

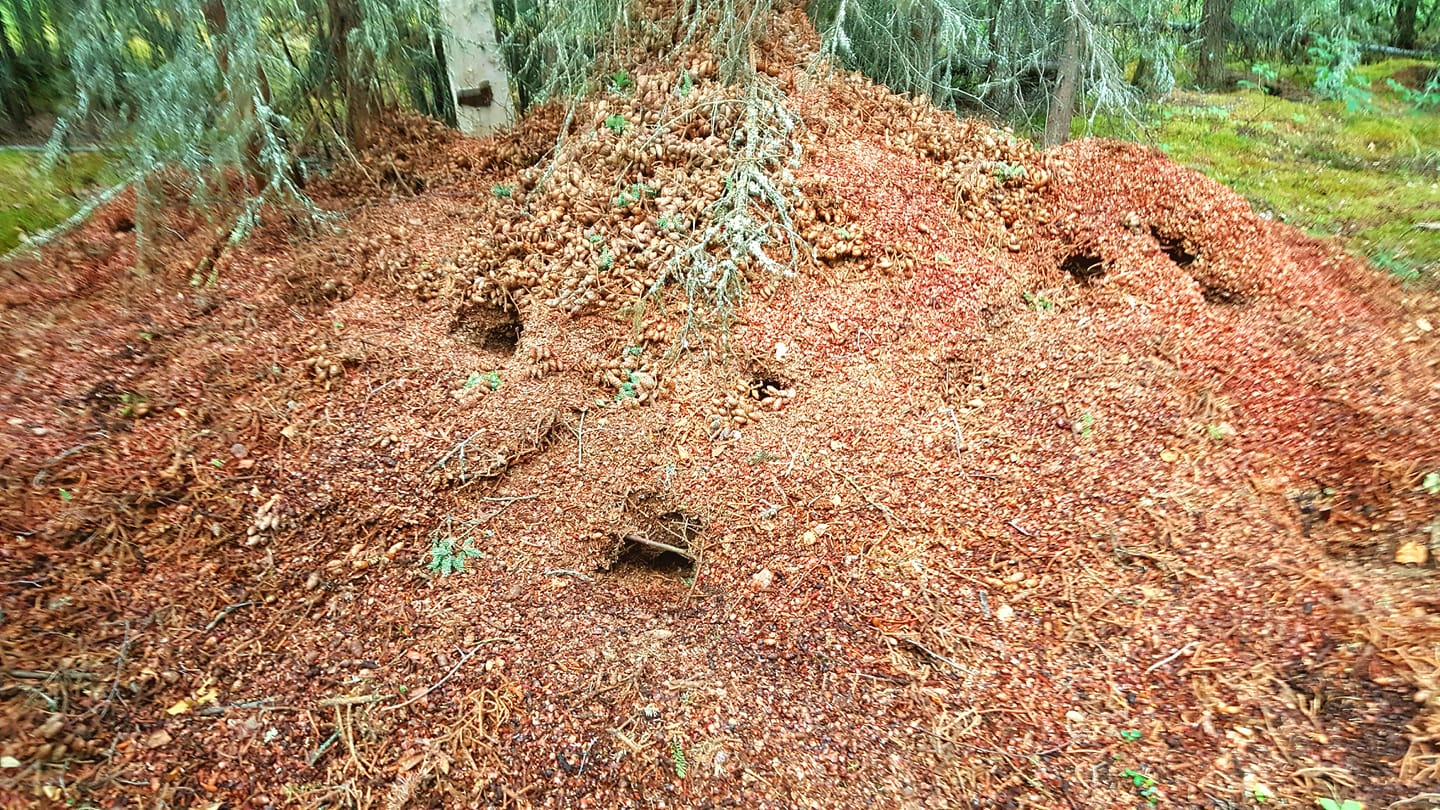
Large midden constructed by American red squirrels, Kenai National Wildlife Refuge, Alaska

American red squirrels are primarily granivores, but incorporate other food items into their diets opportunistically. In the Yukon, extensive behavioral observations suggest white spruce seeds (Picea glauca) comprise more than 50% of a red squirrel's diet, but squirrels have also been observed eating spruce buds and needles, mushrooms, willow (Salix sp.) leaves, poplar (Populus sp.) buds and catkins, bearberry (Arctostaphylos sp.) flowers and berries, and animal material such as bird eggs or even snowshoe hare leverets (young). White spruce cones mature in late July and are harvested by red squirrels in August and September. These harvested cones are stored in a central cache and provide energy and nutrients for survival over the winter and reproduction the following spring. The fallen scales from consumed seed cones can collect in piles, called middens, up to 12 meters (39 feet) across. White spruce exhibits two- to six-year masting cycles, where a year of superabundant cone production (mast year) is followed by several years in which few cones are produced. In southwest Yukon, where red squirrels have been studied since 1987 by the Kluane Red Squirrel Project, this variation means individual squirrels are likely to experience both very high and very low food levels within their lifetimes, and the project was designed as a long-term field experiment testing the importance of food abundance to the species' ecology and evolution. American red squirrel territories may contain one or several middens.

American red squirrels eat a variety of mushroom species, including some that are deadly to humans.

=== Reproduction ===
American red squirrels are spontaneous ovulators. Females enter estrus for only one day, but venture from their territory prior to ovulation, and these exploratory forays may serve to advertise their upcoming estrus. On the day of estrus, females are chased by several males in an extended mating chase. Males compete with one another for the opportunity to mate with the estrous female. Estrous females will mate with 4 to 16 males. Gestation has been reported to range from 31 to 35 days. Females can breed for the first time at one year of age, but some females delay breeding until two years of age or older. Most females produce one litter per year, but in some years reproduction is skipped, while in other years some females breed twice. Litter sizes typically range from one to five, but most litters contain three or four offspring. Offspring are pink and hairless at birth and weigh about 10 g. Offspring grow at approximately 1.8 g per day while nursing, and reach adult body size at 125 days. They first emerge from their natal nests at around 42 days, but continue to nurse until approximately 70 days.

Nests are most commonly constructed of grass in the branches of trees. Nests are also excavated from witches' broom – abnormally dense vegetative growth resulting from a rust disease – or cavities in the trunks of spruce, poplar, and walnut trees. American red squirrels rarely nest below ground. Each individual squirrel has several nests within its territory, and females with young move them between nests. Some behavior has been reported within human dwellings using insulation as nest material.

A three-year study of a population of red squirrels in southwest Yukon reported female red squirrels showed high levels of multiple-male mating, and the genetic relatedness of mates did not predict patterns of parentage. The relatedness of parents had no effect on the neonatal mass and growth rate of their offspring, nor did it affect the survival rate of offspring to one year of age. In the same population, multiple mating did not influence pregnancy rate, litter size, nest fate or offspring quality, and female mating behaviour appears to be a passive response to selection on males to mate with multiple females. Over a ten-year period, the average date of birth in the southwest Yukon population advanced by about 18 days; most of this change was attributed to phenotypic plasticity in response to increased food supply, with a smaller portion attributed to evolutionary change.

=== Sociality ===
Red squirrels are highly territorial and asocial with very few non-reproductive physical interactions (0.6% of all recorded behaviours in one 19-year study). The majority of physical interactions are in male-female matings and between females and their offspring before the offspring disperse to their own territories. The non-reproductive physical interactions recorded were all instances of chasing an intruder from a territory.

== Dispersal and survival ==
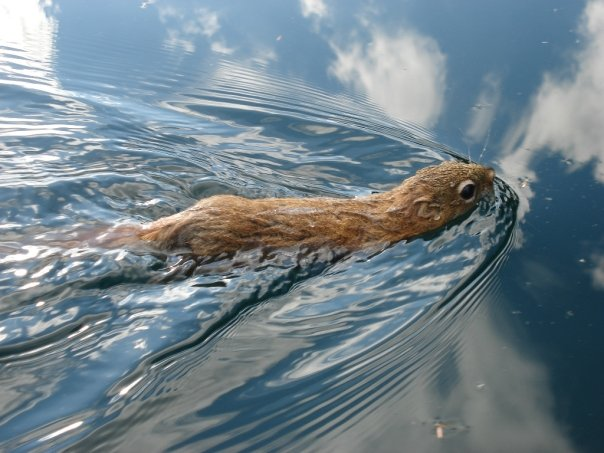
Red squirrel swimming

A red squirrel flees after hearing a potential predator, an American crow.

If juvenile American red squirrels are to survive their first winter, they must acquire a territory and midden. They can acquire a territory by competing for a vacant territory, creating a new territory or by receiving all or part of a territory from their mothers. This somewhat rare (15% of litters) female behavior is referred to as breeding dispersal or bequeathal, and is a form of maternal investment in offspring. The prevalence of this behavior is related to the abundance of food resources and the age of the mother. In some cases, females will acquire additional middens before reproduction, which they later bequeath to their offspring. Offspring that do not receive a midden from their mother typically settle within 150 m (3 territory diameters) of their natal territory. Observations suggest that male red squirrels have environmentally induced, alternative reproductive strategies that result in higher incidences of sexually selected infanticide in years when food is plentiful.

American red squirrels experience severe early mortality (on average only 22% survive to one year of age). The survival probability, however, increases to age three, when it begins to decrease again. Females that survive to one year of age have a life expectancy of 3.5 years and a maximum lifespan of 8 years. Increased maternal attention is correlated with increased offspring growth rate and higher lifetime reproductive success.

Chief predators include Canada lynx (Lynx canadensis), bobcat (Lynx rufus), coyote (Canis latrans), great horned owl (Bubo virginianus), American goshawk (Accipiter atricapillus), red-tailed hawk (Buteo jamaicensis), American crow (Corvus brachyrynchos), American marten (Martes americana), Pacific marten (Martes caurina), red fox (Vulpes vulpes), gray fox (Urocyon cinereoargenteus), wolf (Canis lupus), and weasel (Mustela sp.).
