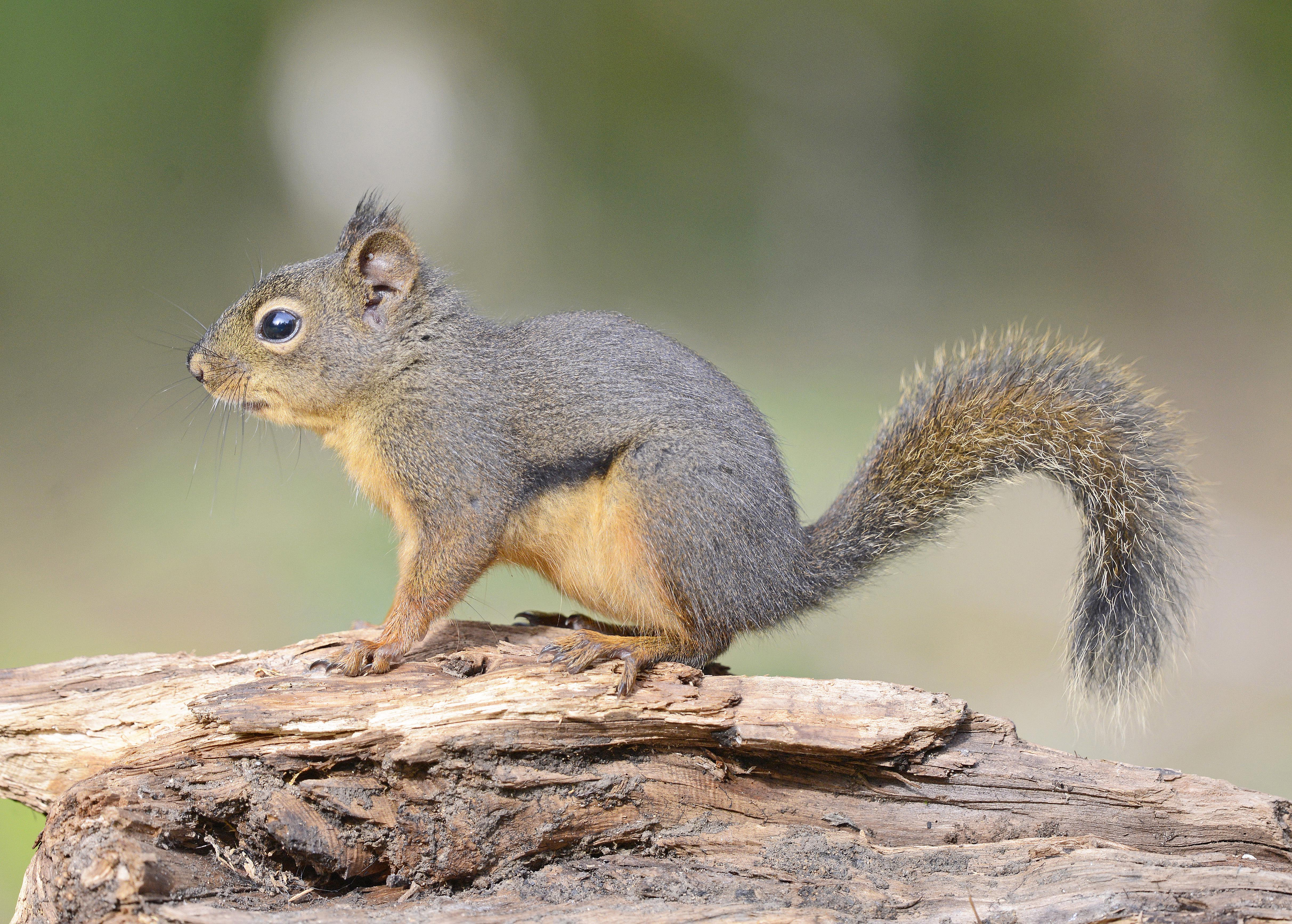

Conservation status
- Least Concern (IUCN 3.1)

- Secure (NatureServe)

Scientific classification
- Kingdom: Animalia
- Phylum: Chordata
- Class: Mammalia
- Order: Rodentia
- Family: Sciuridae
- Genus: Tamiasciurus
- Species: T. douglasii

Binomial name
- Tamiasciurus douglasii (Bachman, 1839)

Subspecies
- T. d. douglasii; T. d. mearnsi; T. d. mollipilosus
- Range (does not include T. d. mearnsi)

= Douglas squirrel =

Species of rodent

The Douglas squirrel (Tamiasciurus douglasii) is a pine squirrel found in western North America, from the Pacific Northwest (including the northwestern coastal states of the United States as well as the southwestern coast of British Columbia in Canada) to central California, with an isolated subspecies in northern Baja California, Mexico. It is sometimes known as the chickaree or pine squirrel, although these names are also used for the American red squirrel. Variant spellings of the common name are Douglas' squirrel and Douglas's squirrel. The Native Americans of Kings River called it the "Pillillooeet", in imitation of its characteristic alarm call.

== Description ==
John Muir described the Douglas squirrel as "by far the most interesting and influential of the California Sciuridæ". At full maturity, it is about 33 cm (13 in) in length (including its tail, which is about 13 cm (5 in) long), and weighs between 150 and 300 g (5.3 and 10.6 oz). Its appearance varies according to the season. In the summer, it is greyish or almost greenish-brown on its back, and pale orange on the chest and belly, while legs and feet appear brown. In the winter, the coat is browner and the underside is grayer; also, the ears appear even tuftier than they do in summer. Like many squirrels, the Douglas squirrel has a white eye-ring.

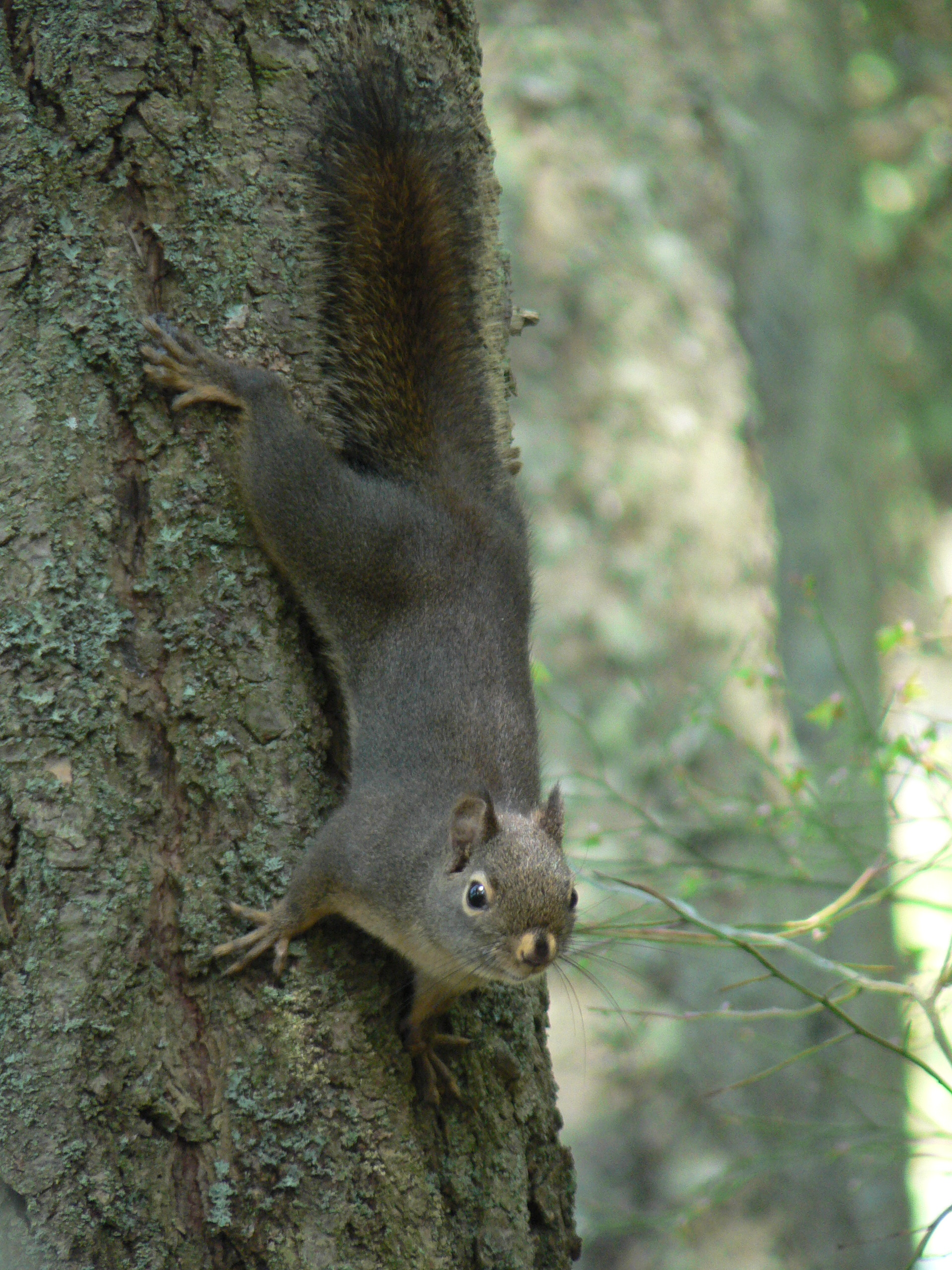
Anacortes Community Forest Lands (Washington)

== Breeding ==
Mating can occur as early as February. Gestation is about four weeks, and the young (which are altricial) are weaned at about eight weeks of age. There may be up to six kits in a litter, though four is more usual. In the southern and lower parts of their range, they produce two litters each year.

== Habitat ==
Douglas squirrels live in coniferous forest habitats along the Pacific Coast, from the Sierra Nevada (mountains) of California, northwards to the southwestern coast of British Columbia. Tamiasciurus douglasii prefer old-growth forests or mature second-growth forests, and some authors regard them as dependent on its presence. Mearns's squirrel is a distinctive subspecies of the Douglas squirrel that instead inhabits xeric pine forests in a small portion of Baja California.

Throughout most of their range, Douglas squirrels essentially replace the niche of the American red squirrel, which inhabits the coniferous forests of the rest of North America. The two species have very minimal overlap in the territory.

Douglas squirrels are territorial; in winter, each squirrel occupies a territory of about 10 000 square metres, but during the breeding season a mated pair will defend a single territory together. Douglas squirrels are active by day, throughout the year, often chattering noisily at intruders. On summer nights, they sleep in ball-shaped nests that they make in the trees, but in the winter they use holes in trees as nests. Groups of squirrels seen together during the summer are likely to be juveniles from a single litter.

== Diet ==
Douglas squirrels mostly eat seeds of coniferous trees such as Douglas fir (Pseudotsuga menziesii), Sitka spruce (Picea sitchensis) and shore pine (Pinus contorta). They also eat the fleshy scales of green giant sequoia cones, as well as acorns, berries, mushrooms, the eggs of birds such as yellow warblers, and some fruit including strawberries and plums. Douglas squirrels are larder hoarders, storing their food in a single location or 'larder' called a midden. As the squirrel peels the scales of cones to get at the seeds, the discarded scales accumulate into piles that can grow to several meters across as the same site is used by generations of squirrels.

Their predators include Pacific martens, bobcats, domestic cats, northern goshawks, and owls; although they quickly acclimatize to human presence, humans can be a threat to them, through robbing of their cone caches to find seeds for tree cultivation and through the destruction of old-growth forest. However, the squirrels' numbers appear to be unaffected by commercial thinning of forests.

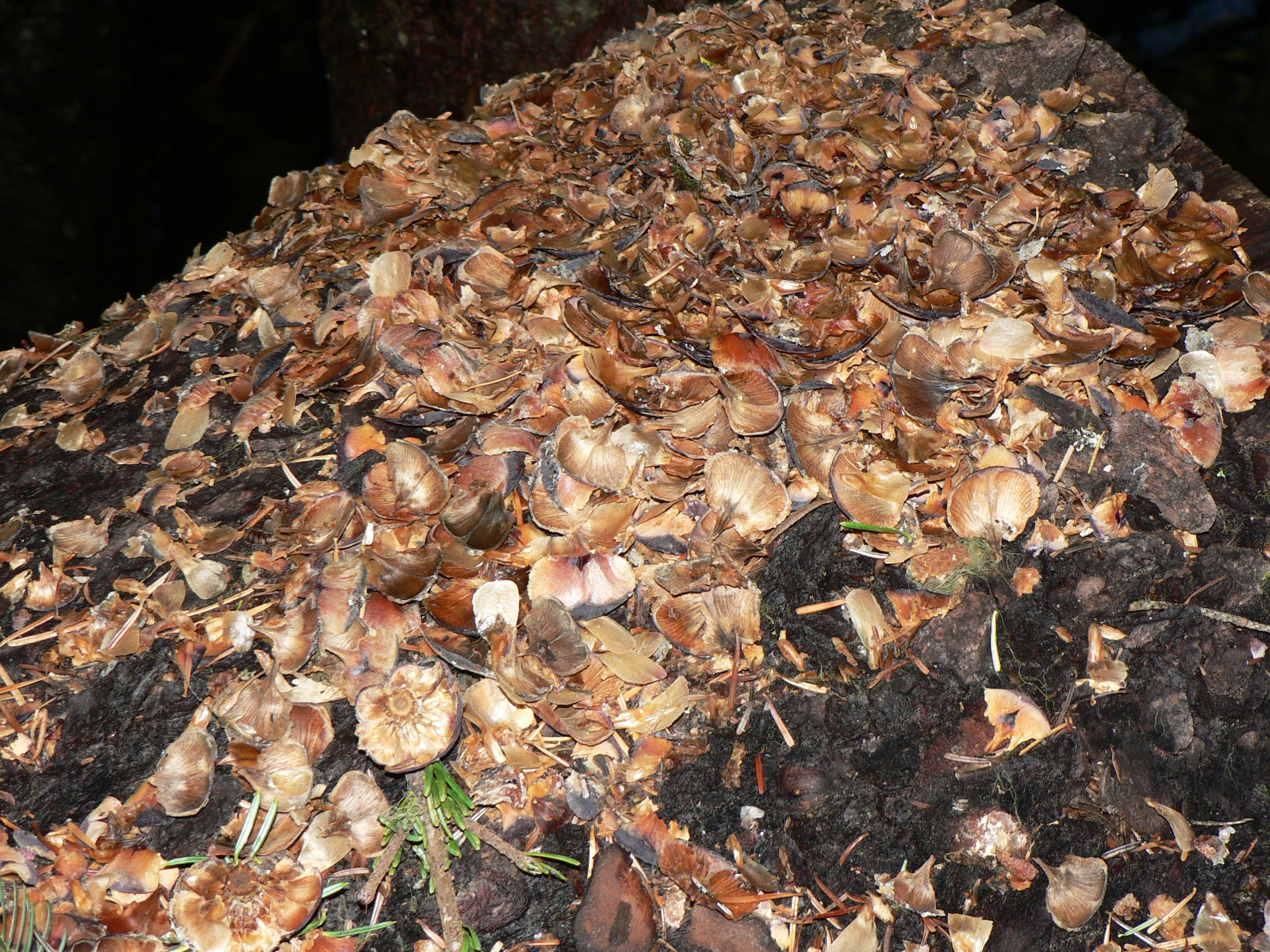
Pacific silver fir cone debris from Douglas squirrels feeding, North Cascades National Park

Tamiasciurus douglasii alarm call
Alarm call of the Douglas squirrel (Tamiasciurus douglasii)
