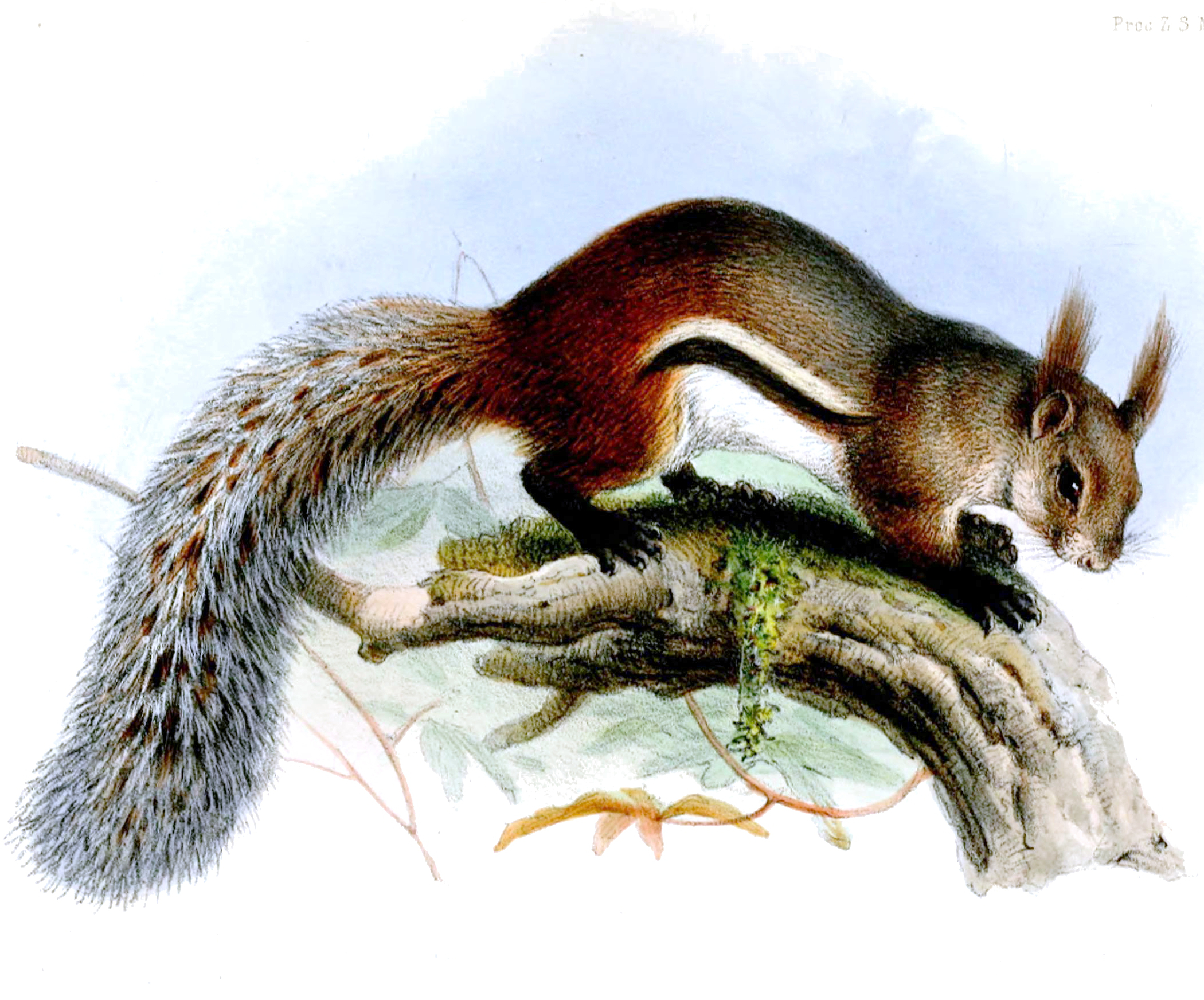

Conservation status
- Vulnerable (IUCN 3.1)

Scientific classification
- Kingdom: Animalia
- Phylum: Chordata
- Class: Mammalia
- Order: Rodentia
- Family: Sciuridae
- Tribe: Sciurini
- Genus: Rheithrosciurus; J. E. Gray, 1867
- Species: R. macrotis

Binomial name
- Rheithrosciurus macrotis (J. E. Gray, 1857)
- Tufted ground squirrel range

= Tufted ground squirrel =

Species of rodent

The tufted ground squirrel or groove-toothed squirrel (Rheithrosciurus macrotis) is a species of rodent in the family Sciuridae. It is the sole species in the genus Rheithrosciurus. It is found only on the island of Borneo. Confirmed elements of its diet include nuts, seeds and insects, for which it has been filmed foraging on the forest floor.

== Description ==
The squirrel's head and body measure about 335–352 mm (13.2–13.9 in) long, with the tail measuring a further 299–342 mm (11.8–13.5 in) long. It weighs about 1–2 kg (2.2–4.4 lb). Its incisors have 7-10 distinctive longitudinal grooves. Its skull is also distinctive, being longer and flatter than most squirrels. The animal's dorsum is predominantly brown with a reddish tone, and it has unusually hairy ears with large red to dark brown tufts. A longitudinal stripe of a white to buff to yellow colour, sometimes accompanied by a dark brown stripe, runs along the flank.

Rheithrosciurus is noted for having the largest known tail to body size ratio of any mammal, with the volume of its tail including the air included in the fluff being 130% of the volume of its body. (Compare 90% for the red squirrel.) It is unclear why the squirrel has such a large tail but scientists have suggested that it may have evolved to distract predators or to prevent them getting a firm grasp when attacking. It may alternatively have a function in communicating with other squirrels or in courtship. Other possible explanations, such as being used to keep the animal warm or for balance, seem unlikely as the squirrel lives on the ground in a warm region. The tail has a grizzled charcoal colour with white frosting and rises in a plume, with the longest hairs at the tip.

== Habitat ==
The species is known to live only on hillsides in lowland primary forest on the island of Borneo, at altitudes of under 1,100 metres (3,600 ft). It has occasionally been seen in orchards and secondary forests but sightings are rare. Due to deforestation it is considered to be vulnerable and is totally protected in Sarawak, one of the two Malaysian states on Borneo. Hunting with a licence is legal in Sabah, the island's other Malaysian state. Some natives use the squirrel's tail to decorate the hilt of their parang knives.

== Natural history ==
Rheithrosciurus is believed to forage on the ground and the lower canopy, holding its tail high over its head as it does so, and also climbs high trees to seek food. It appears to be diurnal in its habits.

The squirrel is locally reputed to be a carnivore and has been dubbed the "vampire squirrel". According to forest-dwelling Dayak hunters, it attacks and kills deer to eat their stomach contents, liver and heart. The squirrel is said to achieve this by waiting on low branches, jumping on passing deer and biting their jugular veins to make them bleed to death. Once the deer dies, the squirrel eats the deer's internal organs. The hunters report occasionally finding deer disembowelled in this way and attribute them to "squirrel kills". It is also said to kill domestic chickens and eat their hearts and livers. The naturalist Edward Banks recorded in 1949 that the squirrel was "wary, difficult to observe and biting fiercely", and other species of squirrel are known to be active hunters of small vertebrates.

The squirrel's reputed carnivorousness has not been observed scientifically but it is known to have a highly specialised diet that includes the nuts of the canarium tree. Other elements of its diet include fruits, seeds and insects.

== Research ==
Rheithrosciurus was the subject of a paper published in the scientific journal Taprobanica in June 2014. Very little is known about the biology and lifestyle of the squirrel, but in 2015 researchers working in the Gunung Palung National Park in the West Kalimantan region of Borneo managed for the first time to obtain clear video pictures of the animal using motion-activated cameras. They were able to record it foraging on the forest floor.
