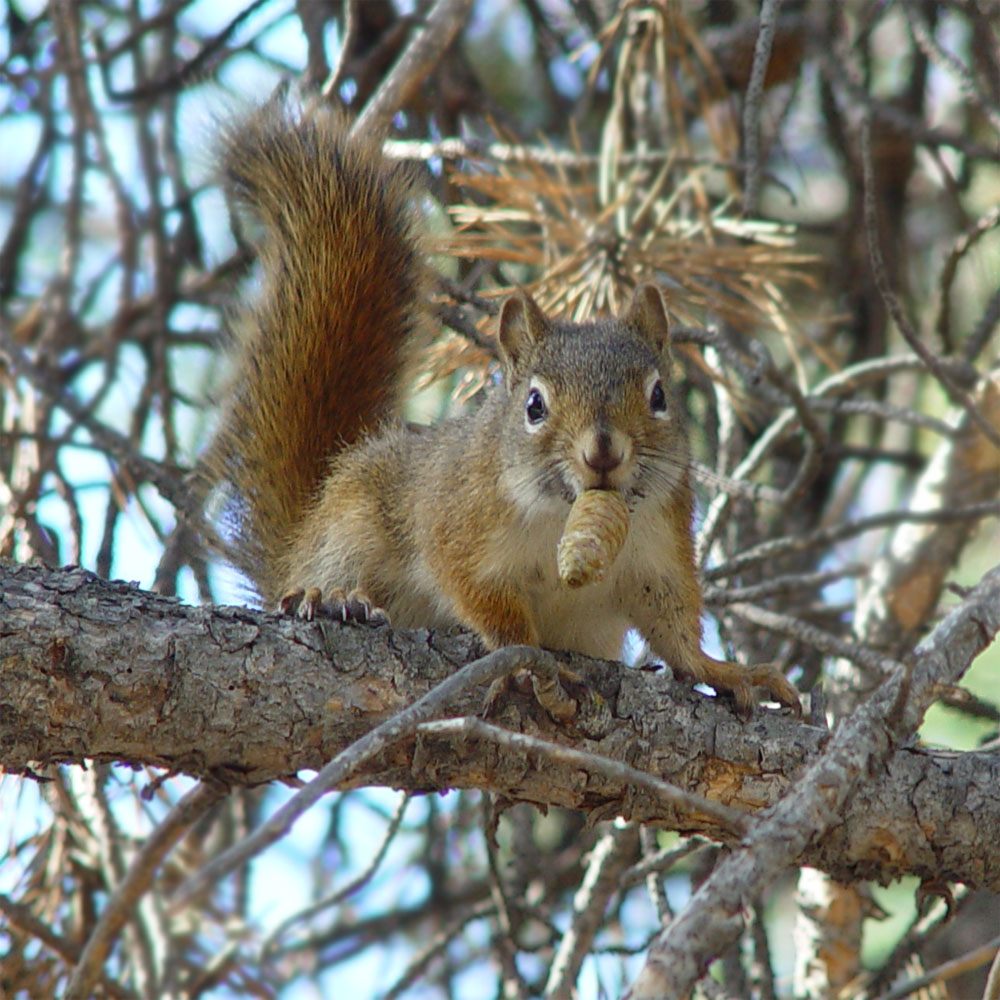
- American red squirrel (Tamiasciurus hudsonicus)

Scientific classification
- Kingdom: Animalia
- Phylum: Chordata
- Class: Mammalia
- Order: Rodentia
- Family: Sciuridae
- Tribe: Sciurini
- Genus: Tamiasciurus; Trouessart, 1880

Type species
- [Sciurus vulgaris] hudsonicus Erxleben, 1777

Species
- Tamiasciurus douglasii; Tamiasciurus fremonti; Tamiasciurus hudsonicus

= Pine squirrel =

Pine squirrels Temporal range: Middle Pleistocene - Recent

Genus of rodents

Pine squirrels are squirrels of the genus Tamiasciurus, in the Sciurini tribe, of the large family Sciuridae.

== Species ==
This genus includes three species:

- Tamiasciurus douglasii — Douglas squirrel
  - T. d. mearnsi — Mearns's squirrel
- Tamiasciurus fremonti — southwestern red squirrel
  - T. f. grahamensis — Mount Graham red squirrel
- Tamiasciurus hudsonicus — American red squirrel

All three species are native to North America. Pine squirrels can be found in the northern and western United States, most of Canada, Alaska, and northwestern Mexico.

== Description ==
Pine squirrels, Tamiasciurus species, are small tree squirrels with bushy tails. Along with members of the genus Sciurus, they are members of the Sciurini tribe.

The name Tamiasciurus comes from Greek wiktionary:ταμίας tamías ‘steward, dispenser’ and wiktionary:σκίουρος skíouros 'squirrel'.

The American red squirrel should not be confused with the Eurasian red squirrel (Sciurus vulgaris) — both are usually just referred to as the "red squirrel" in their home continents.

Pine squirrels rely on a variety of food sources including fungi, plants, arthropods and tree seed.
