= Mazinaw Lake =

Lake in Ontario, Canada

Lake Mazinaw
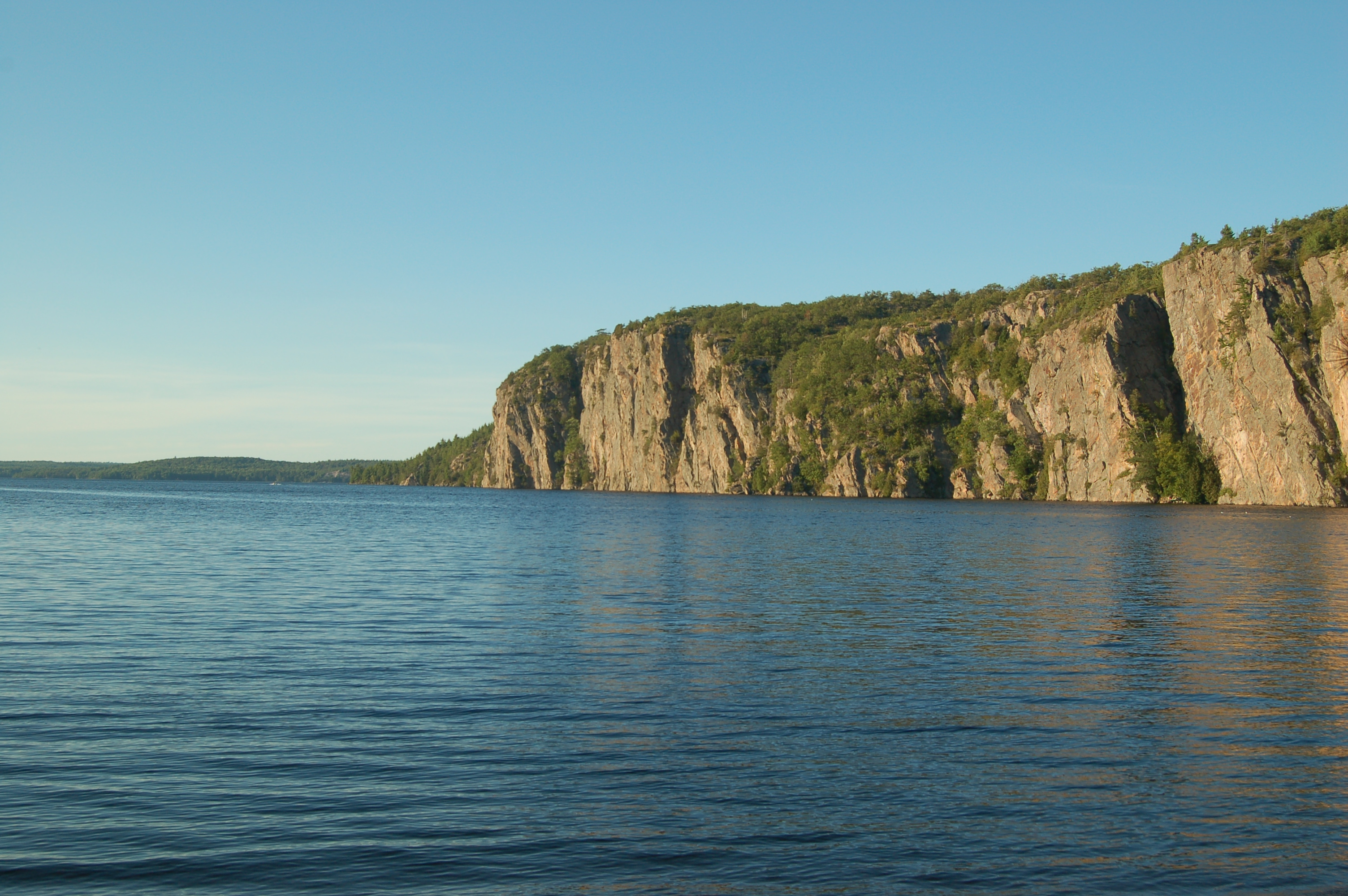

- Location within Ontario
- Location: Addington Highlands, Ontario
- Coordinates: 44°55′N 77°12′W
- Primary inflows: upper Mississippi River
- Primary outflows: upper Mississippi River
- Basin countries: Canada
- Average depth: 41 m (135 ft)
- Max. depth: 145 m (476 ft)
- Shore length^{1}: 49 km (30 mi)
- Surface elevation: 268 m (879 ft)
- Settlements: Cloyne Ontario
- ^{1} Shore length is not a well-defined measure.

Lake Mazinaw is a lake in the Addington Highlands north of Kaladar in Eastern Ontario. The lake is situated on the upper Mississippi River. It has a perimeter of 49 km (30 mi) and averages 41 m (135 ft) in depth with a maximum depth of 145 m (476 ft), making it the seventh-deepest lake in Ontario, including the Great Lakes. There is a narrows which divides the lake into two sections: South Mazinaw, and North Mazinaw, with North Mazinaw being larger and deeper.

Bon Echo Provincial Park encompasses the central section of the lake, including the narrows between North and South Mazinaw and the Bon Echo Rock formation attracts rock climbers from all over the world. The lake's name comes from Mazinaabikinigan-zaaga'igan, meaning "painted-image lake" in Algonkian, referring to the pictographs on Bon Echo which overlooks the lake. Bon Echo rock, located on the eastern side of North Mazinaw, features over 260 native pictographs- often confused with petroglyphs – the largest visible collection in Canada - including the Ojibwa trickster figure and culture hero, Nanabush. The Rabbit man is the most famous pictograph visible today.

The rock also contains a tribute to Walt Whitman, inscribed by Horace Traubel And Flora MacDonald Denison, who ran the Bon Echo Inn on the site of the provincial park during the 1910s. The inscription reads “my foothold is tenon’d and mortised in granite, I laugh at what you call dissolution and I know the amplitude of time.”

A dam is located at the outflow of the lake to maintain the level of the lake and to control water flow into the Mississippi River during the spring runoff time.

Peregrine Falcons have been reintroduced to the area- nesting on top of Bon Echo Rock. Mink can be spotted along the northern shores of the lake. Loons are native to the area and can be heard calling throughout the lake.

== See also ==
- List of lakes in Ontario
