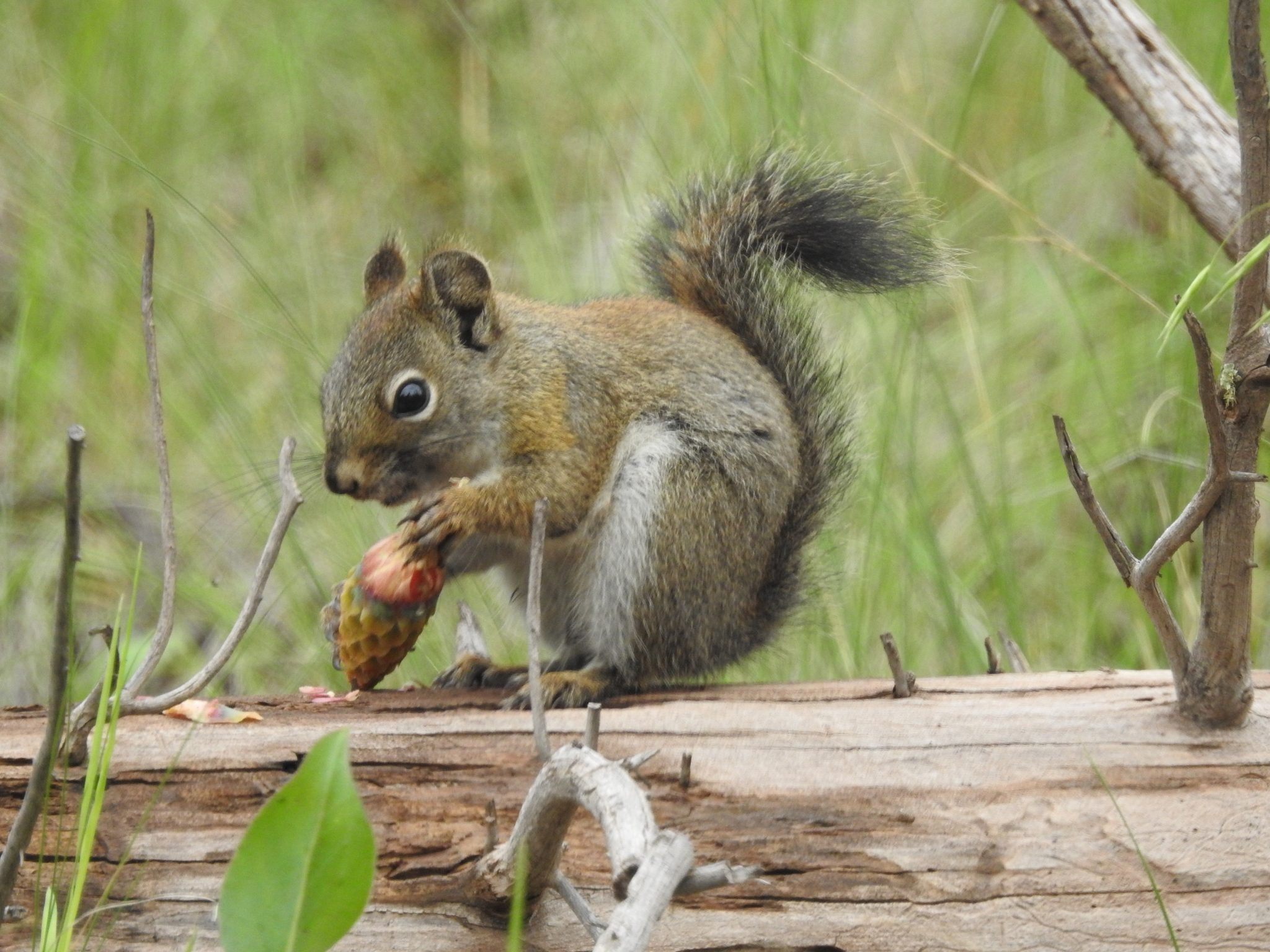

Conservation status
- Unrankable (NatureServe)

Scientific classification
- Kingdom: Animalia
- Phylum: Chordata
- Class: Mammalia
- Order: Rodentia
- Family: Sciuridae
- Genus: Tamiasciurus
- Species: T. fremonti

Binomial name
- Tamiasciurus fremonti (Audubon & Bachman, 1853)

Subspecies
- T. f. grahamensis T. f. mogollensis

Synonyms
- Tamiasciurus hudsonicus fremonti

= Southwestern red squirrel =

Species of tree squirrel

The southwestern red squirrel or Fremont's squirrel (Tamiasciurus fremonti) is a species of tree squirrel, in the genus of pine squirrel, endemic to high-altitude regions of the southwestern United States.

== Taxonomy ==
It was formerly considered conspecific with the American red squirrel (T. hudsonicus), but a 2016 study found sufficient phylogenetic evidence indicating it was a distinct species. The American Society of Mammalogists accepted the results of this study.

The Mount Graham red squirrel (T. f. grahamensis) is a notable, endangered subspecies of the southwestern red squirrel. In addition, genetic sampling indicates that squirrels from the Sacramento Mountains of New Mexico form a highly divergent clade that dates back to the Last Glacial Maximum, about 130,000 years ago. Squirrels in the San Mateo Mountains also appear to be genetically divergent, although this is only based on a single individual.

== Distribution ==
It ranges from the Rocky Mountains of Colorado into the Sacramento Mountains in New Mexico and the Mogollon Mountains in both New Mexico and Arizona. Its range overlaps with that of T. hudsonicus in the southern Rocky Mountains.

== Habitat ==
They largely inhabit mixed coniferous and spruce-fir forests. Although they occasionally venture down into ponderosa pine forests, they are absent from ranges that do not include the higher-elevation spruce-fir and mixed coniferous forests. Due to the limited range of this habitat, the population of southwestern red squirrels is naturally fragmented and has little gene flow between subpopulations; these populations may have been more widespread during the last glaciation, when these forests were more connected. Fossil remains of this species are known from the Guadalupe Mountains, indicating that they likely once had a suitable climate.

== Conservation ==
There is little evidence of demographic-driven expansion in populations of this species, and mountain ranges each have their own highly-divergent clades of species, indicating high separation and little gene flow between populations. If this lack of connectivity is compounded with further degradation of their habitats, the population dynamics of this species could eventually be driven by extinction. Thus, this species is thought to be of high conservation concern. One notable subspecies, the Mount Graham red squirrel, is already thought to be endangered.
