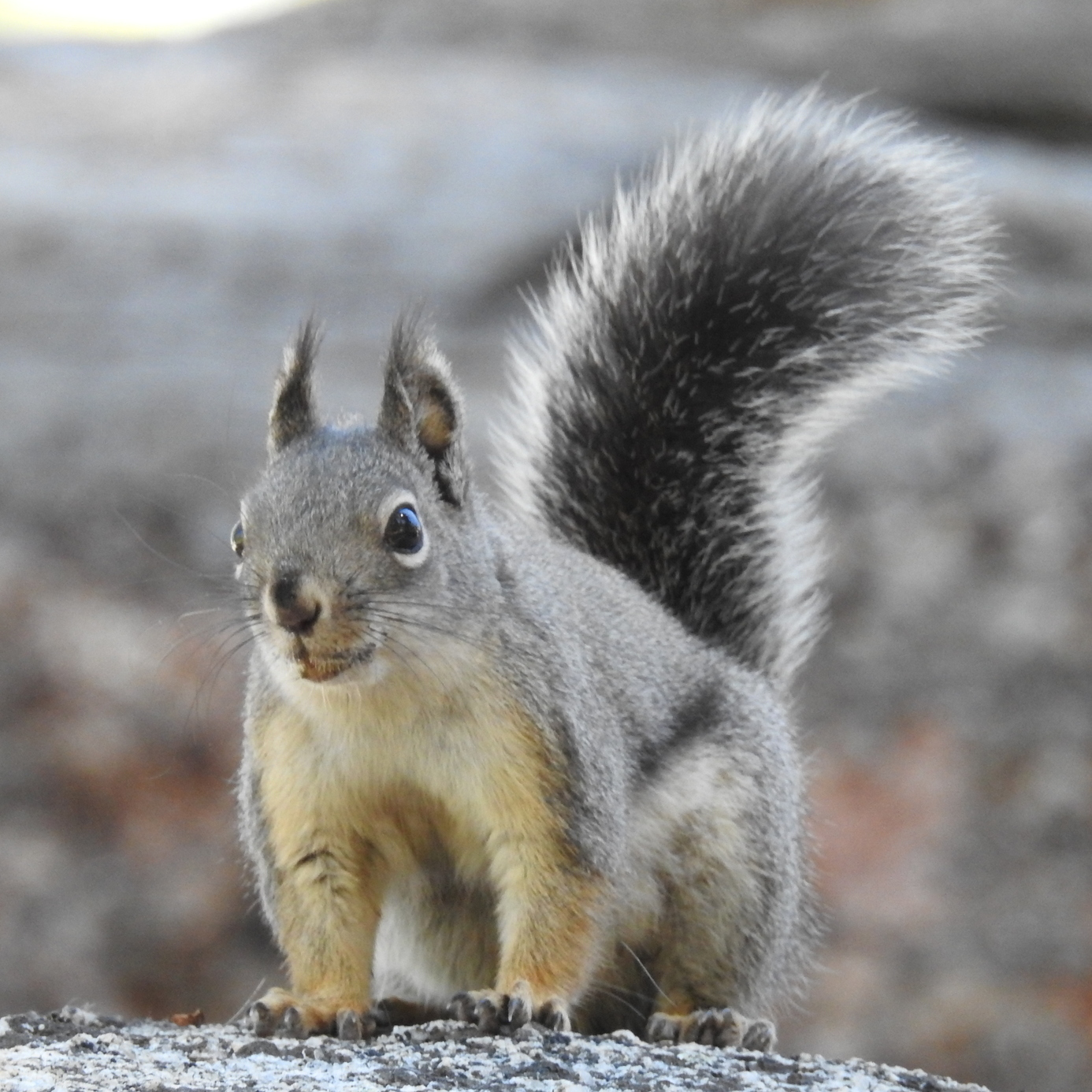

Conservation status
- Endangered (IUCN 3.1)

Scientific classification
- Kingdom: Animalia
- Phylum: Chordata
- Class: Mammalia
- Order: Rodentia
- Family: Sciuridae
- Genus: Tamiasciurus
- Species: T. douglasii
- Subspecies: T. d. mearnsi

Trinomial name
- Tamiasciurus douglasii mearnsi (Townsend, 1897)

Synonyms
- Tamiasciurus mearnsi

= Mearns's squirrel =

Subspecies of rodent

Mearns's squirrel (Tamiasciurus douglasii mearnsi) is a subspecies of the Douglas squirrel endemic to Mexico. It is endangered and occurs in low densities, and is threatened by habitat loss. It is possibly also threatened by competition from the eastern gray squirrel, which was introduced to the range of Mearns's squirrel in 1946, but may not be present anymore. It is closely related to other subspecies of the Douglas squirrel, but far less is known about its behavior, which was first studied in detail in 2004. It is named for the 19th-century American naturalist Edgar Mearns.

== Taxonomy ==
Although formerly considered a distinct species due to its isolated habitat, phylogenetic evidence indicates that it has little genetic differentiation from the Douglas squirrel, and that the clades comprising the Douglas squirrel are paraphyletic with respect to it, and due to this it was reclassified as a subspecies of the Douglas squirrel. Despite this, it is very different from any other member of Tamiasciurus in habitat and behavior, and thus it is thought to be of major conservation value.

== Description ==
Mearns's squirrel is a relatively small tree squirrel, with an average head-body length of 20 cm (7.9 in), and weighing about 270 g (9.5 oz). They have soft, dense, fur, which is grey-brown on the upper body and white with yellow patches on the underparts. There is a stripe of solid black fur on each flank, and a narrow band of reddish-yellow fur runs down the middle of the back. The tail is bushy, with darker fur than the body, but fringed with white and yellow. The fur on the head is mostly grey, becoming yellowish towards the snout, and with dark ears and clear rings of white fur around the eyes.

== Distribution and habitat ==
Mearns's squirrel is known from only three sites in the Sierra de San Pedro Mártir in Baja California, Mexico. The region is surrounded by areas of chaparral and desert, isolating the tree squirrel from its closest relatives elsewhere, and indicating that it is likely a relict population isolated by forest fragmentation during the Pleistocene. The three sites all consist of pine and fir forests at altitudes of 2,100–2,400 m (6,900–7,900 ft), and cover an area of no more than 40,655 ha (157 sq mi).

== Biology and behavior ==
Mearns's squirrel is diurnal and herbivorous, feeding mainly on the seeds of fir and pine trees. Unlike its closest relatives, such as the Douglas squirrel, it does not hoard food for future use, and it rests in cavities in trees, rather than constructing nests from leaves. The squirrels do not appear to be territorial, and two individuals may sometimes share the same resting cavity. Vocalizations are known to include a high-pitched "rattle", a chirp, and a barking sound.

The mating season lasts from around February to August, with one or two litters of two to five young being born each year.
