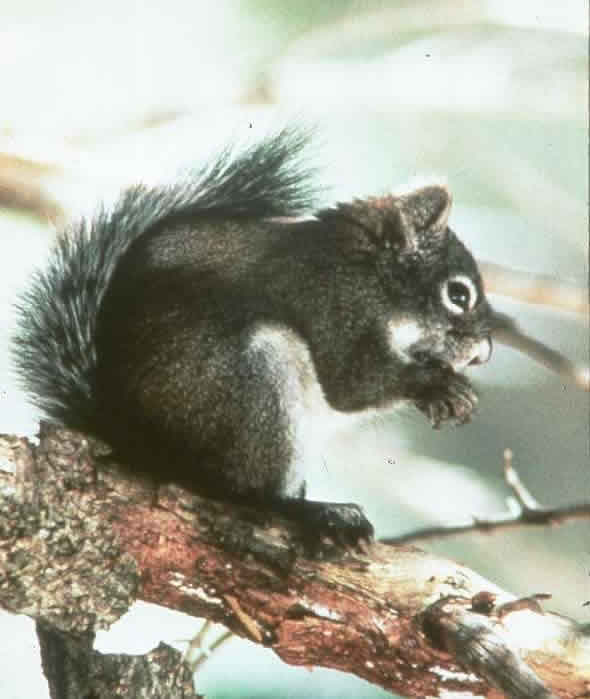

Conservation status
- Critically Imperiled (NatureServe)

- Endangered (ESA)

Scientific classification
- Kingdom: Animalia
- Phylum: Chordata
- Class: Mammalia
- Order: Rodentia
- Family: Sciuridae
- Genus: Tamiasciurus
- Species: T. fremonti
- Subspecies: T. f. grahamensis

Trinomial name
- Tamiasciurus fremonti grahamensis (J. A. Allen, 1894)

Synonyms
- Sciurus hudsonicus grahamensis J. A. Allen, 1894; Tamasciurus hudsonicus grahamensis (J. A. Allen, 1894)

= Mount Graham red squirrel =

Subspecies of rodent

The Mount Graham red squirrel (Tamiasciurus fremonti grahamensis) is an endangered subspecies of the southwestern red squirrel (Tamiasciurus fremonti) native to the Pinaleño Mountains of Arizona. It is smaller than most other subspecies of red squirrel, and also does not have the white-fringed tail that is common to the species. Its diet consists mainly of mixed seeds, conifer cones and air-dried fungi. It exhibits similar behavior to other squirrels in its species.

== Description ==
=== Physical ===
The Mount Graham red squirrel is a generally tiny squirrel weighing on average around 8 ounces (230 g) and measuring about 8 inches (20 cm) in length. The subspecies also has a 6-inch (15 cm) tail. Unlike most other squirrels in its species, the squirrels do not have a white-fringed tail. Both females and males share similar markings and features and are typically grayish brown in color with rusty yellow or orange markings on their backside. During the winter season, the squirrels' ears are tufted with fur, and during the summer a black lateral line is observed on the squirrel. The skull of the subspecies is rounded and its teeth are low-crowned.

=== Behavior ===
Mount Graham red squirrels behave in a manner similar to most other subspecies of American red squirrel. They are diurnal and do not hibernate during the winter months, but instead carry out activities in the mid-day sun. Mount Graham squirrels usually eat a diet of mixed seeds, conifer cones and air-dried fungi.

== Habitat ==
Historically, the Mount Graham red squirrel inhabited about 11,750 acres (47.6 km^{2}) of spruce-fir, mixed-conifer and ecotone zone habitats that were generally at higher elevations throughout the Pinaleño Mountains. Recent data shows that it occurs more frequently at the ecotone zone than the other habitats. When choosing a potential nesting site, the squirrels typically pick a cool, moist area with an abundance of food sources. Drought, forest fires, and insect infestation have been responsible for a decrease of the squirrel in the spruce-fir habitat.

== Conservation ==
The Mount Graham subspecies was believed to be extinct in the 1950s, but was "rediscovered" in the 1970s. After its rediscovery, it was suggested for threatened or endangered species status under the Endangered Species Act in 1982. On May 21, 1986, the subspecies was officially recommended to become an endangered species, and effective June 3, 1987, was listed as endangered. The Mount Graham International Observatory was controversial when it was built in the squirrel's habitat; the observatory has been required to monitor the community near the observatory to determine if its construction is having any negative effects on the population. Habitat loss is also occurring at high levels for a variety of natural and anthropogenic reasons. In 1988, the U.S. Fish and Wildlife Service designated most of this area as a refuge, and access to the area is granted only with a special permit. A lightning strike on June 7, 2017, started a wildfire that could have led to the extinction of this subspecies.

In September 2019, the U.S. Fish and Wildlife Service agreed to consider if the squirrel needed further protection. They were petitioned under a procedure of the Endangered Species Act by a group that contends it is necessary to remove the observatory and other private structures.
