= Flora MacDonald Denison =

Canadian suffragist (1867–1921)

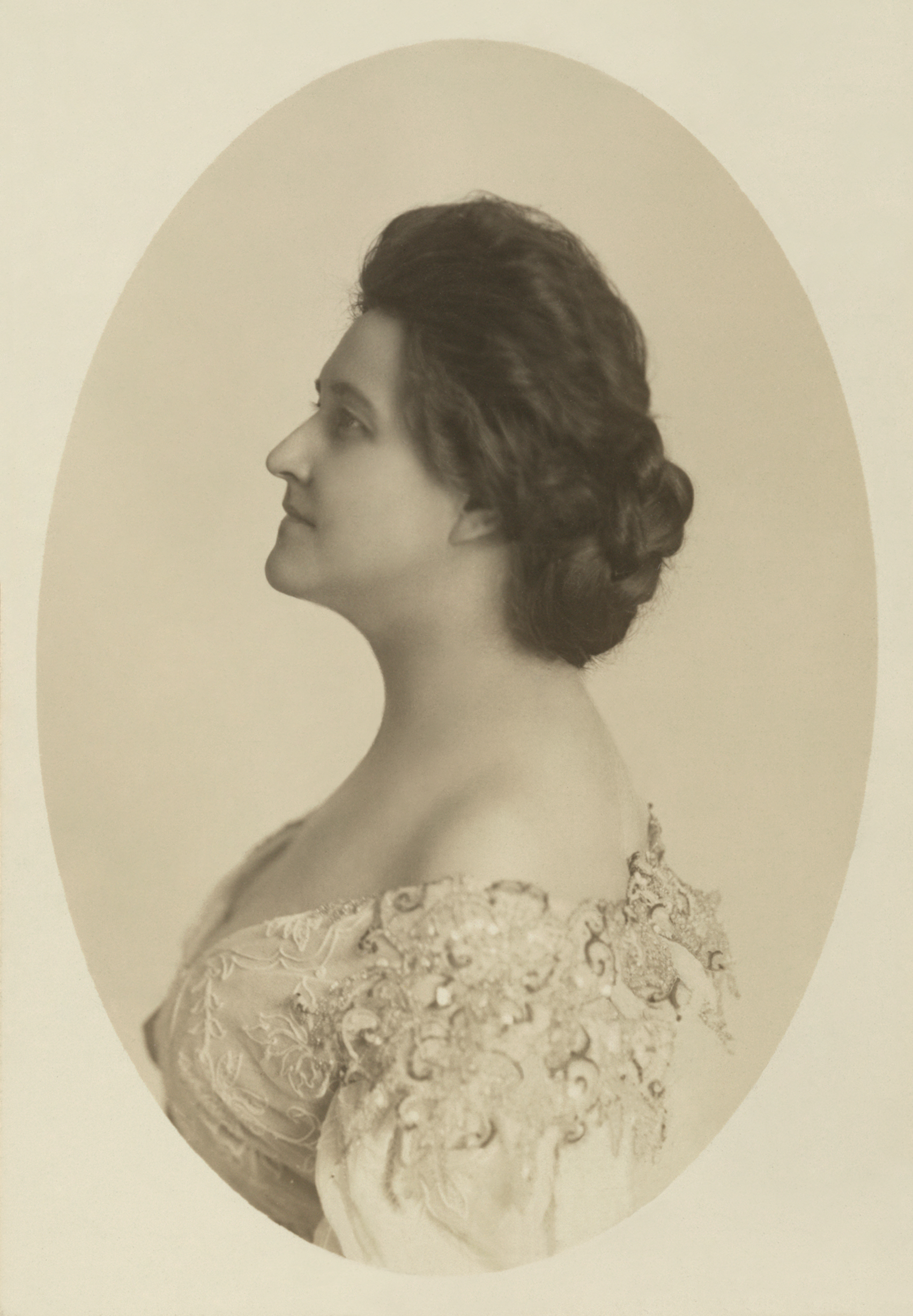
- Born: Flora Merrill; February 20, 1867; Tweed, Ontario, Canada
- Died: May 23, 1921 (aged 54); Toronto, Ontario, Canada
- Occupations: Political activist; journalist
- Spouse: Howard (Harry) Denison (1892-death)
- Children: Merrill Denison

Flora MacDonald Denison (née Merrill; February 20, 1867 – May 23, 1921) was a Canadian activist, journalist, and businesswoman known for her leadership in the Canadian suffragist movement and her stewardship of Bon Echo Provincial Park in Ontario.

== Early life and career ==
Flora Merrill was born on February 20, 1867, in Prince Edward County, Ontario. She was the third youngest of eight siblings born to George A Merrill and Elizabeth MacTavish Thompson. Denison grew up in a household that struggled financially. Her sister, Mary, died at a young age; Denison later wrote a novel, Mary Melville, about her sister's spiritualism.

After working as a seamstress and a teacher, she settled in Toronto in 1893 and became a dressmaker. In 1910, Denison and her husband bought the Echo Inn which they operated as a wilderness retreat for artists. An admirer of Walt Whitman, Denison published a literary magazine, The Sunset of Bon Echo, in tribute to Whitman's work and organized the creation of a large stone monument dedicated to him at the nearby Mazinaw Lake.

Denison was a Theosophist and member of the Canadian Anti-Vivisection Society.

== Involvement with the suffragist movement ==
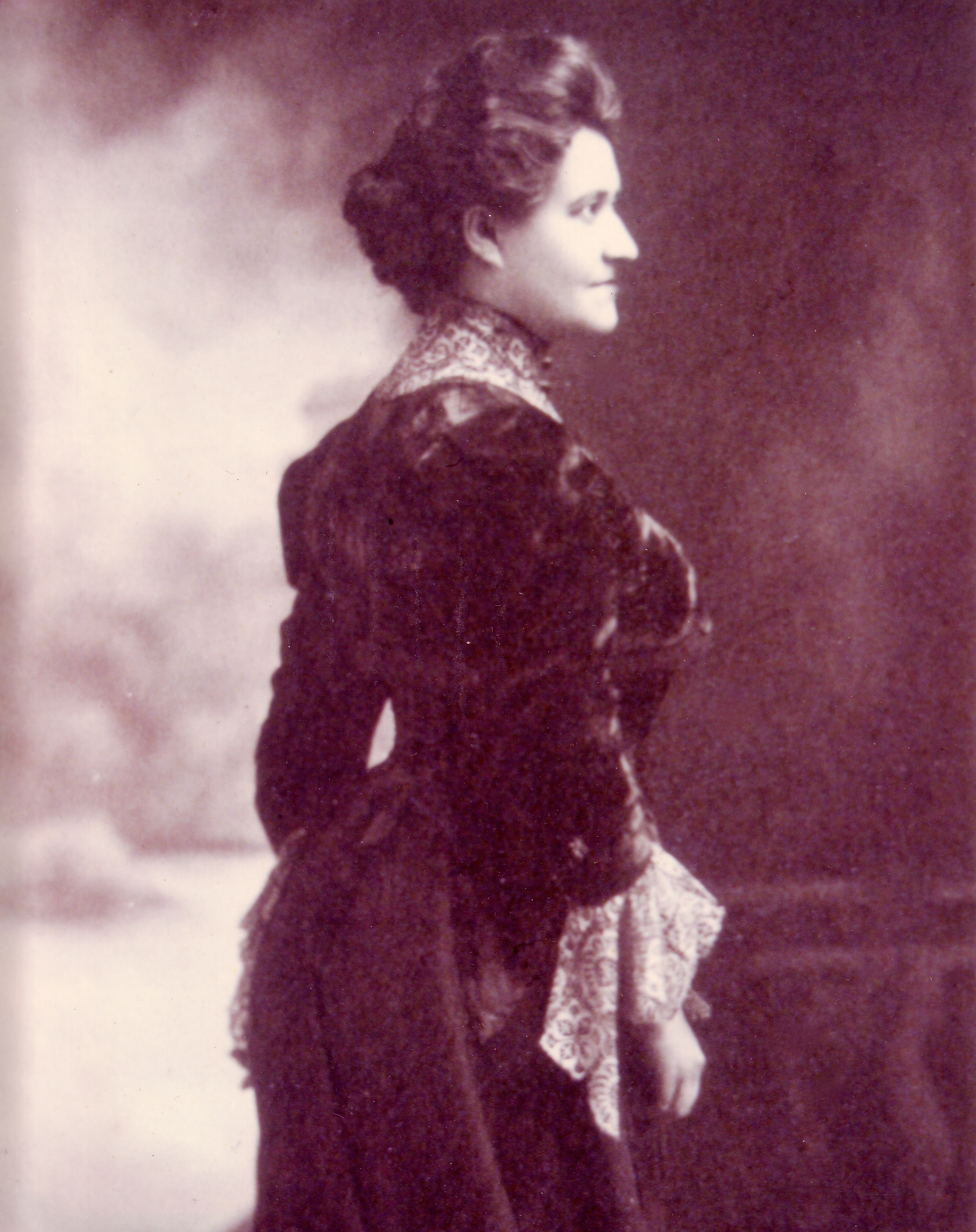
Denison

Denison's involvement in the movement for women's rights grew after her move to Toronto. She joined the Canadian Suffrage Association in 1906 when it was founded by Augusta Stowe-Gullen and became an active member and campaigner. In 1906, Denison traveled to Copenhagen as Canada's delegate to the International Woman Suffrage Alliance. She also attended the International Woman's Suffrage Alliance convention in Budapest in 1913. After meeting the British activist Emmeline Pankhurst in London, she organized the latter's first trip to Canada in 1909. She served as president of the Canadian Suffrage Association from 1911 to 1914, until her controversial support for the militant tactics of the Women’s Social and Political Union in England resulted in her forced resignation.

Denison also turned to writing and public speaking as a means of promoting her beliefs. Her first major speaking event took place in 1904 before an audience of 5,000 at the Lily Dale Spiritualist center in 1902. For four years from 1909 to 1913, Denison had her own weekly column in the Toronto Sunday World in which she wrote about women's issues. Denison encouraged women to imagine how they might create a different society, and promoted the creation of child care centers for poor working families. She argued that women's freedom would require them to gain financial independence from men and advocated against the gendered division of labor in society. Denison advocated for an anti-war position in her 1914 publication Women and War. She also corresponded about the women's vote with Ontario Premier James Whitney and Canadian Prime Minister Robert Borden. In the U.S., Denison worked as a lecturer for the National American Woman Suffrage Association in 1917.

== Family ==
Denison married Howard Denison in Detroit, in 1892. Denison's son, Merrill Denison, became a popular Canadian playwright.

== Later life ==
Towards the end of her life, Denison's health worsened as a result of several illnesses including the Spanish influenza. She died on May 23, 1921, as a result of pneumonia developed from influenza, at the age of 54.
