= Susannah of the Mounties =

Book by Muriel Denison

- First edition (US)
- Author: Muriel Denison
- Language: English
- Genre: Children's novel
- Publisher: Dodd, Mead & Co. (US); Dent (UK)
- Publication date: 1936
- Publication place: Canada
- Media type: Print (Hardback & Paperback)
- Pages: 286 pp
- Followed by: Susannah of the Yukon

Susannah of the Mounties is a children's novel by Canadian author Muriel Denison, first published in 1936. In the book 9-year-old Susannah is sent to Regina, Saskatchewan to spend the summer with her uncle who is a Mountie. There are several sequels to the book: Susannah at Boarding School, Susannah of the Yukon and Susannah Rides Again.

== Film adaptation ==
In 1939 it was adapted into the film Susannah of the Mounties starring Shirley Temple as Susannah. The movie plot differs significantly from the book: it is set twenty years earlier at a much smaller Mounted Police fort and Susannah's parents are dead rather than in India, while the character of the uncle is omitted. The film is a U.S. version of the West rather than the Canadian West of the book.
