= Muriel Denison =

Canadian writer

- Born: Jessie Muriel Goggin; 1886; Winnipeg, Manitoba, Canada
- Died: 1954 (aged 67–68); Toronto, Canada
- Other name: Frances Newton
- Education: Havergal College
- Occupation: Writer
- Spouse: Merrill Denison

Muriel Denison, née Jessie Muriel Goggin (1886–1954), was a Canadian writer.

Born in Winnipeg, Manitoba, she was educated at Havergal College, Edgehill School, and the Royal Conservatory of Music (Toronto). In 1926, she married author and playwright Merrill Denison.

Denison is best known as the author of the "Susannah" novels, a series of books set in the years 1896–1900, and featuring Susannah Winston, age 9–13: Susannah of the Mounties, Susannah of the Yukon, Susannah at Boarding School, and Susannah Rides Again. The first book was the inspiration for the Shirley Temple movie of the same name, though the two stories are very different.

Denison often wrote nonfiction using the pen name "Frances Newton" for articles in This Week, Reader's Digest, McCall's, and other magazines.

Denison lived in New York for 20 years before her death, but returned to Toronto to go to hospital and died there.
