= Big Doe Camp =

Coordinates: 43.7510°N 79.1919°W

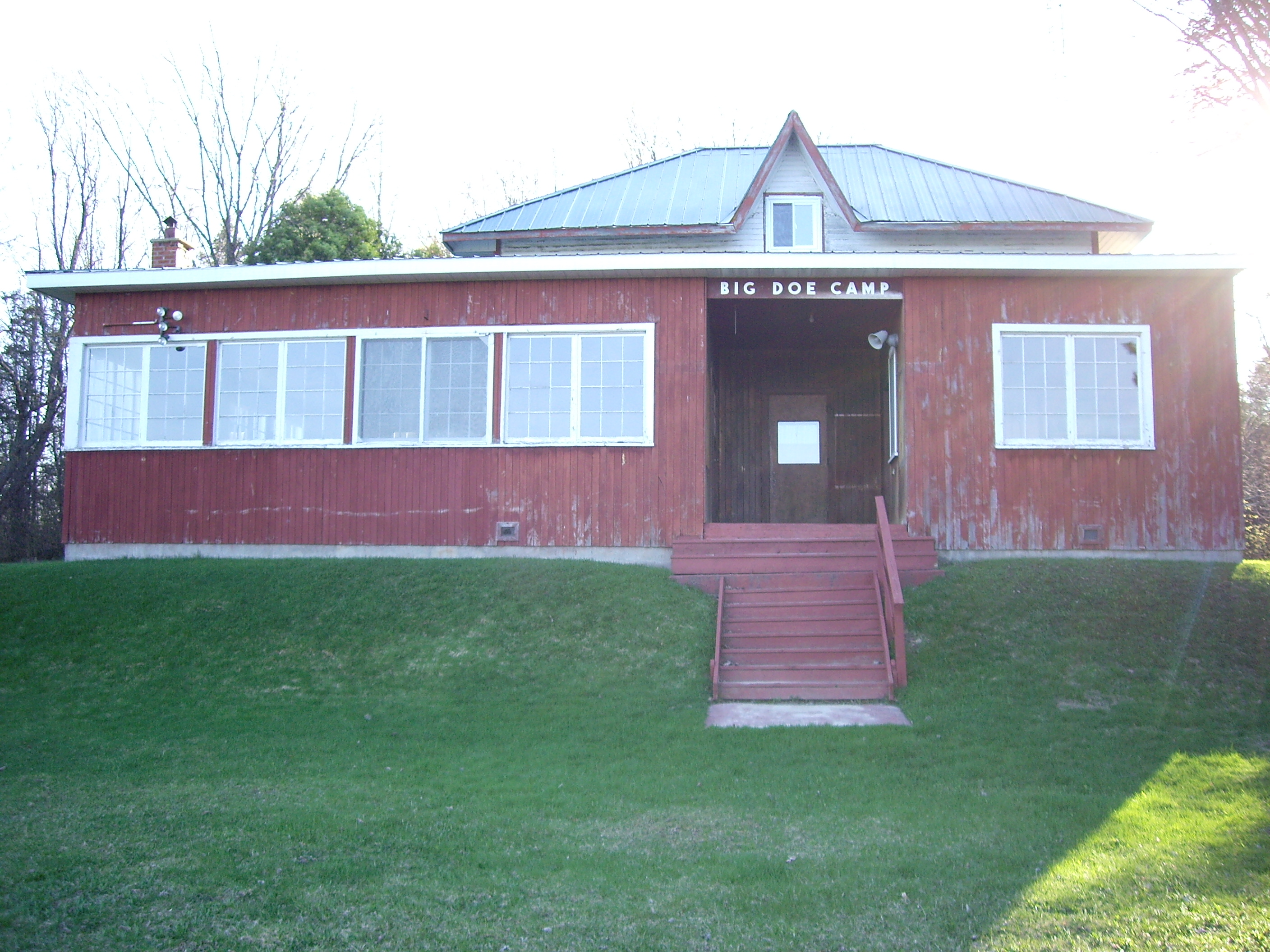
- Old Camp Dining Hall in May 2007
- Formation: c. 1946
- Founders: Aubrey Rhamey; Marjorie Rhamey
- Dissolved: c. 1998
- Type: Residential summer camp for boys
- Location(s): Big Doe Lake, Ontario, Canada
- Services: Summer camp for Campers (ages 7-14); CITs (ages 15-16)
- Members: 70 campers per session
- Website: Alumni Facebook Group

Big Doe Camp was a boys' residential summer camp located on Big Doe Lake not far from the village of Burk's Falls, Ontario.

== Background ==
The camp was founded in 1946 by Aubrey and Marjorie Rhamey and operated from its location on Big Doe Lake for more than 50 years. Big Doe Camp was an accredited member of the Ontario Camping Association and the Canadian Camping Association by its affiliation with the Ontario Camping Association.

The Camp was operated for more than merely commercial purposes. Aubrey and Marjorie aimed to break even every summer, though quite often they didn't even do that. It was a family tradition, family run operation about giving something back to the community and watching the boys' grow into young men.

During the prime years of operation, the founders had a tough time trying to keep a balance between bringing in new younger campers and allowing the older campers to keep returning every year due to a shortage of space. They were at times forced to turn boys away. But even with that pressure, they also kept a few spaces for boys from the Children's Aid Society who were allowed to attend camp for free. These boys were never grouped together, singled out, or identified.

== Program & Activities ==
The camp program consisted of three periods of assigned programs in the morning and two period of optional in the afternoon. Due to the number of camp activities which revolved around the water swimming was a core program and all campers had swimming as one of their assigned programs during one of the morning periods to receive swimming lessons.

Camp Activities included: Swimming, Fishing, Sailing, Canoeing, Campcraft, Water Skiing, Wakeboarding, Nature Lore, Horseback Riding, Archery, Arts and Crafts, Riflery (Shooting) and numerous sports including: Badminton, Volleyball, Basketball, Soccer, Football, Baseball, Rugby, Street Hockey, Tennis, and more.

== Football Camp ==
Football camps were held at Big Doe beginning in 1949 and ran for many years. The football camps were a brainchild of Argo's professional football player and U of T sports hall of fame member Ted Toogood and former North Toronto Collegeiate coach Bob Coulter.

In 1955 the football camp attracted 52 Toronto High School students and a couple of out of towners all trying to get into shape and prepare for the upcoming football season. Camp founder Aubrey Rhamey was himself head grid coach of the Malvern Collegiate football team at the time. There were very few if any football camps operating at the time and this was considered very much needed as the time to get the boys into shape and the start of the football season only a couple of weeks into the start of the school year was very short. The boys attending the camp were not from any one school but came from Lawrence Park, Bloor, UTS, East York, Downsview, Malvern, Scarborough, Vaughn Road and Forest Hill as well as a few out of towners from Brantford, Brampton, and Kirkland Lake.

== Canoe Tripping ==
The camp also operated a small canoe tripping program in which most campers got out on a canoe trip every summer. For beginners at Camp they lasted 1 or 2 nights, for the more experienced Campers up to 10 or more days. Some trips went to far off places such as Lake Temagami, Northern Quebec, James Bay, Algonquin Park, and Georgian Bay.

== Competition ==
Competitions and challenges always existed at camp and were a regular tradition. Competitions existed in Swimming, Running, and Portaging among others.

Some of the Competitions Included:

- The Mile Swim - just that a mile long swim across the lake
- The Kilometre Race - a kilometre long running race
- The Portage Race - a kilometre long run portaging a canoe.
- The Canoe Regatta
- The Swim Meet

== Following Closure ==
Following the closing of the camp, many of the camps cabins, buildings, docks, canoes, and sailboats were auctioned off. Today the main lodge of the camp where the dining hall and main office was located remains and was used as a cottage by the family until its sale in 2018.

Old Camp Memorabilia including photographs and old camp brochures can be found in the Ontario Camping Association Fonds located in the Trent University Archives. A taped interview with Camp founders Aubrey and Marjorie Rhamey talking about the camp can also be found in the Trent University Archives.

The old camp bell used to call campers to Free Swim during the day and down to the waterfront in the morning before breakfast can be seen on display at the Burk's Falls & District Historical Society along with some other memorabilia.

== See also ==
- Ahmic Lake
- Burk's Falls, Ontario
- Lake Cecebe
- Doe Lake (Parry Sound District)
- Magnetawan River
- List of Summer Camps
