= Scouting and Guiding in Grenada =

Scouting and Guiding movement in Grenada

The Scout and Guide movement in Grenada is served by two organisations

- The Girl Guides Association of Grenada, member of the World Association of Girl Guides and Girl Scouts
- The Scout Association of Grenada, member of the World Organization of the Scout Movement
