= Magnetawan =

- Township Municipality (single-tier)
- Municipality of Magnetawan
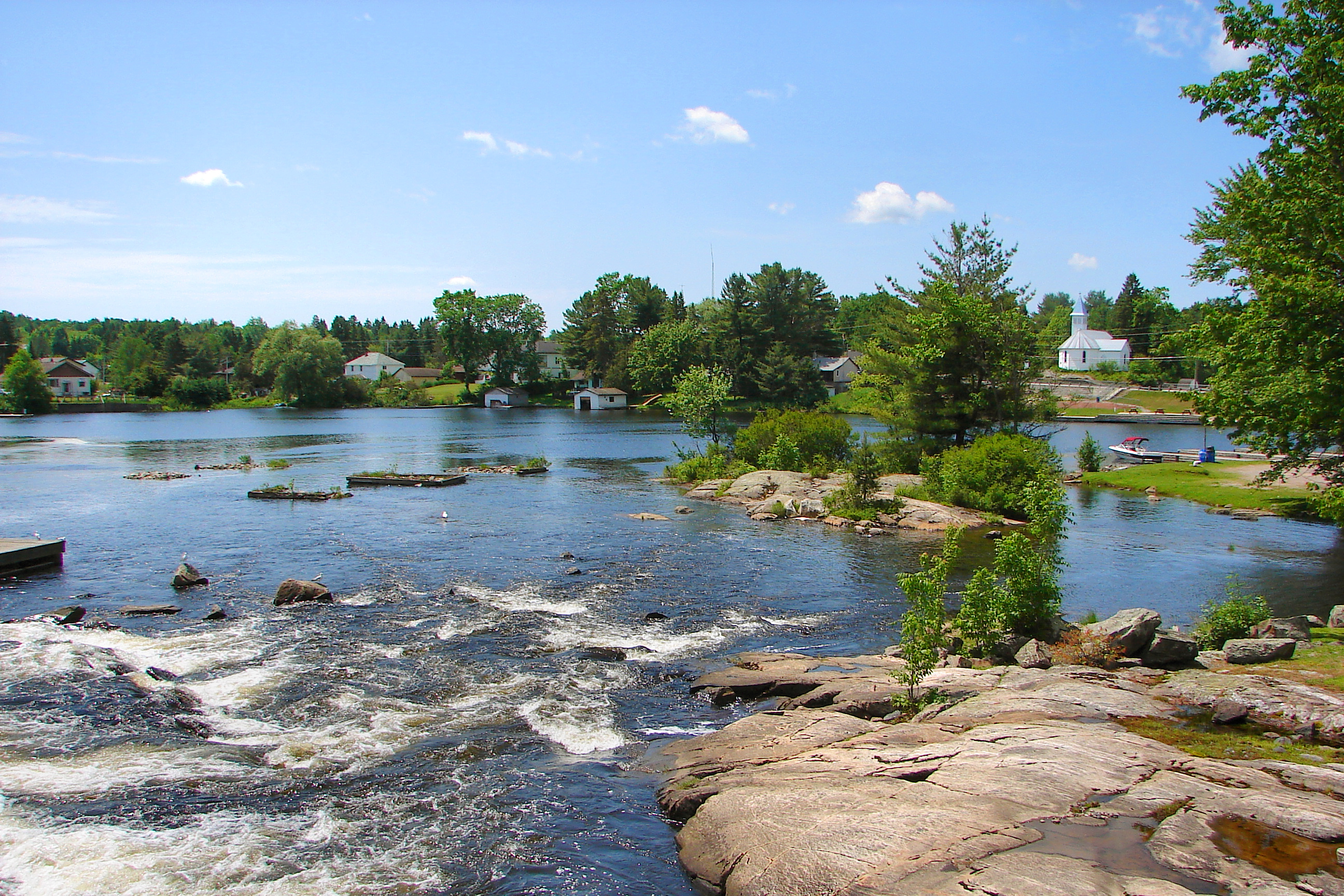
- Magnetawan on the Magnetawan River
- Interactive map of Magnetawan
- Location within Parry Sound District Location within Ontario
- Coordinates: 45°41′06″N 79°40′22″W<
- Country: Canada
- Province: Ontario
- District: Parry Sound
- Settled: 1870s
- Incorporated: January 1, 1998

Government
  - Type: Township
  - Mayor: Sam Dunnett
  - Fed. riding: Parry Sound-Muskoka
  - Prov. riding: Parry Sound—Muskoka

Area
  - Land: 526.31 km^{2} (203.21 sq mi)

Population (2021)
  - Total: 1,753
  - Density: 3.3/km^{2} (8.5/sq mi)
- Time zone: UTC-5 (EST)
  - Summer (DST): UTC-4 (EDT)
- Postal Code: P0A
- Area code: 705
- Website: magnetawan.com

Magnetawan is a township municipality in the Almaguin Highlands region of the Parry Sound District in the Canadian province of Ontario.

The Township of Magnetawan was formed on January 1, 1998, through the amalgamation of the former Township of Chapman and the former Village of Magnetawan, along with the unincorporated geographic township of Croft. On January 1, 2000, Magnetawan annexed additional unorganized areas.

The word Magnetawan in the Algonquin language means "swiftly flowing river."

Magnetawan is the setting for The Rogue Hunter, the tenth book in the popular Urban Fantasy Argeneau series by Ontario-born author Lynsay Sands.

== History ==
The first people to inhabit the region were the Hurons, Ojibway and Algonquins, who would visit the area in the summer for hunting and fishing but sheltered on Georgian Bay in the winter. While some Europeans explored the region in the early 19th century, settlement and colonization by Europeans was hardly taking place, so much so that the government considered turning the entire region into an Indian reserve.

But when pine stands in southern Ontario became depleted, the area attracted loggers and the government changed its mind and encouraged settlement through free land grants, first offered in 1853. Settlement happened slowly but accelerated when the colonization road from Rosseau to Nipissing began being built in 1866. In 1868, the government passed the Free Grand Land and Homestead Act and began advertising this extensively in European countries to attract new immigrants. Croft Township was surveyed in 1869, Chapman Township in 1870, and the village of Magnetawan was mapped out in 1873.

The Great North Road, from Parry Sound to Nipissing, reached the Magnetawan at Ahmic Harbour in 1870. The 76 miles (122 km) stretch of the colony road from Rousseau to Nipissing reached the Magnetawan in 1874, where the historic village of Magnetawan was built. In 1879 a pair of small steamships started carrying cargo and passengers over the 20 miles (32 km) reach from the rapids at the village upstream to Burk's Falls.

Burk's Falls was linked to the south by a railroad in 1885. A lock was completed, enabling navigation west of the rapids at the historic village of Magnetawan, in 1886. Following its completion larger steamships started carrying cargo and passengers, and towing log booms, over the reach from Burk's Falls to Ahmic Harbour. During its first 25 years of operation the lock-keeper recorded steamships transited the lock 17,590 times. The last steamship, a tugboat used to tow log-booms, used the river in 1934.

== Geography ==
Core rock samples done by Walfried Schwerdtner in the surrounding area, show mostly foliated Grenville Gneiss.

=== Communities ===
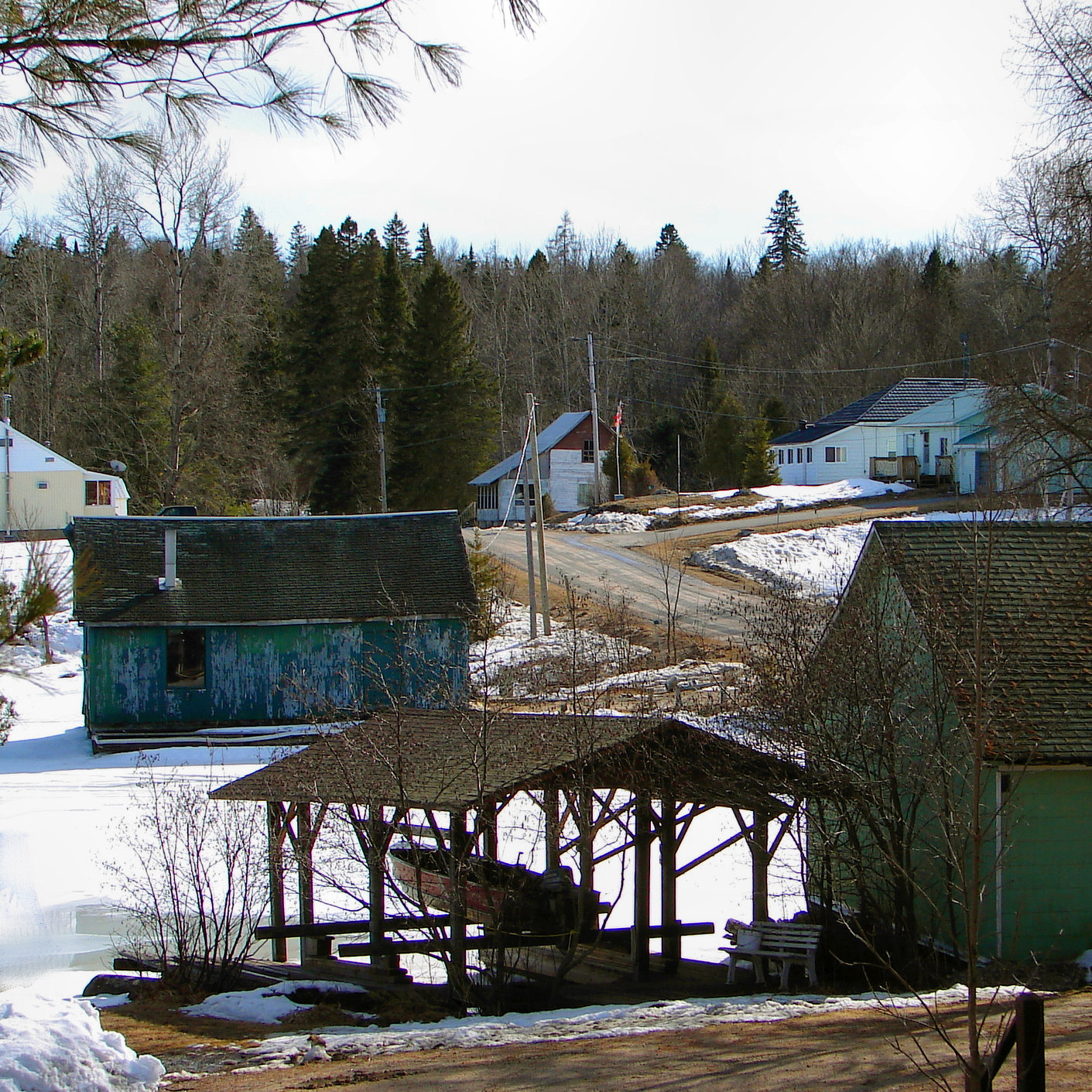
Ahmic Harbour

The township comprises the communities of Ahmic Harbour, Ahmic Lake, Cecebe, Cedar Croft, Chikopi, Dufferin Bridge, Magnetawan, North Seguin, Oranmore, Pearceley, Port Anson and Port Carmen, as well as the ghost town of Spence.

=== Lakes and rivers ===
- Old Man's Lake
- Ahmic Lake Filled with these species of fish: Smallmouth Bass, Largemouth Bass, Pickerel(Walleye)stocked yearly, Crappie, Sunfish, Rock Bass, Whitefish, Catfish, Perch, and Northern Pike.
- Lake Cecebe
- Magnetawan River
- Beaver Lake
- Horn Lake
- Distress River

== Demographics ==
In the 2021 Census of Population conducted by Statistics Canada, Magnetawan had a population of 1,753 living in 825 of its 1,717 total private dwellings, a change of 26.1% from its 2016 population of 1,390. With a land area of 526.31 km^{2} (203.21 sq mi), it had a population density of 3.3/km^{2} (8.6/sq mi) in 2021.

Canada census – Magnetawan community profile

	2021	2016	2011
Population	1,753 (+26.1% from 2016)	1,390 (-4.4% from 2011)	1,454 (-9.7% from 2006)
Land area	526.31 km^{2} (203.21 sq mi)	531.53 km^{2} (205.22 sq mi)	531.83 km^{2} (205.34 sq mi)
Population density	3.3/km^{2} (8.5/sq mi)	2.6/km^{2} (6.7/sq mi)	2.7/km^{2} (7.0/sq mi)
Median age	59.2 (M: 59.2, F: 59.2)	57.4 (M: 56.6, F: 58.1)	54.3 (M: 54.6, F: 54.1)
Private dwellings	1,717 (total) 825 (occupied)	1,698 (total)	1,782 (total)
Median household income	$67,000	$54,336

References: 2021 2016 2011

Historical census populations – Magnetawan

Year	Pop.	±%
1996	1,324	—
2001	1,342	+1.4%
2006	1,610	+20.0%

Year	Pop.	±%
2011	1,454	−9.7%
2016	1,390	−4.4%
2021	1,753	+26.1%

Source: Statistics Canada

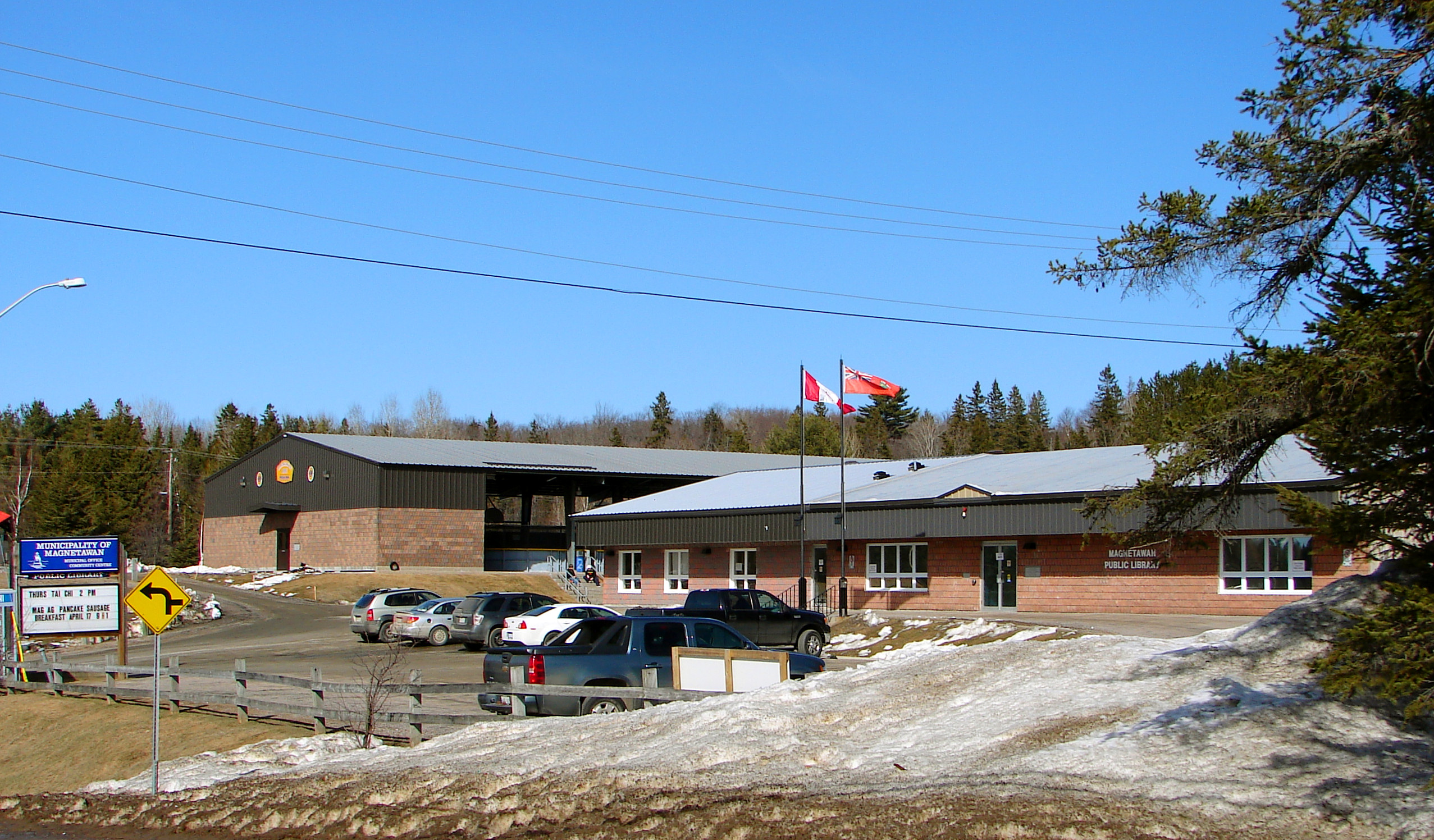
Municipal office and library of Magnetawan

Prior to amalgamation (1998):

- Population total in 1996: 1,324
  - Magnetawan (village): 241
  - Chapman (township): 645
- Population in 1991:
  - Magnetawan (village): 267
  - Chapman (township): 605

Mother tongue (2021):

- English as first language: 90%
- French as first language: 2%
- English and French as first language: 0.3%
- Other as first language: 7.4%

== Attractions ==
Magnetawan is a historic village with a surrounding municipality that provides various attractions. From the museum to the picturesque waters, are all a part of this municipality. The downtown used to consist of a restaurant named The Magnetawan Inn, also June's Inn, as well as a small hotel/bar, and a General Store. In the summer of 2011, on July 30, the General Store burned down taking part of the Magnetawan Inn with it.

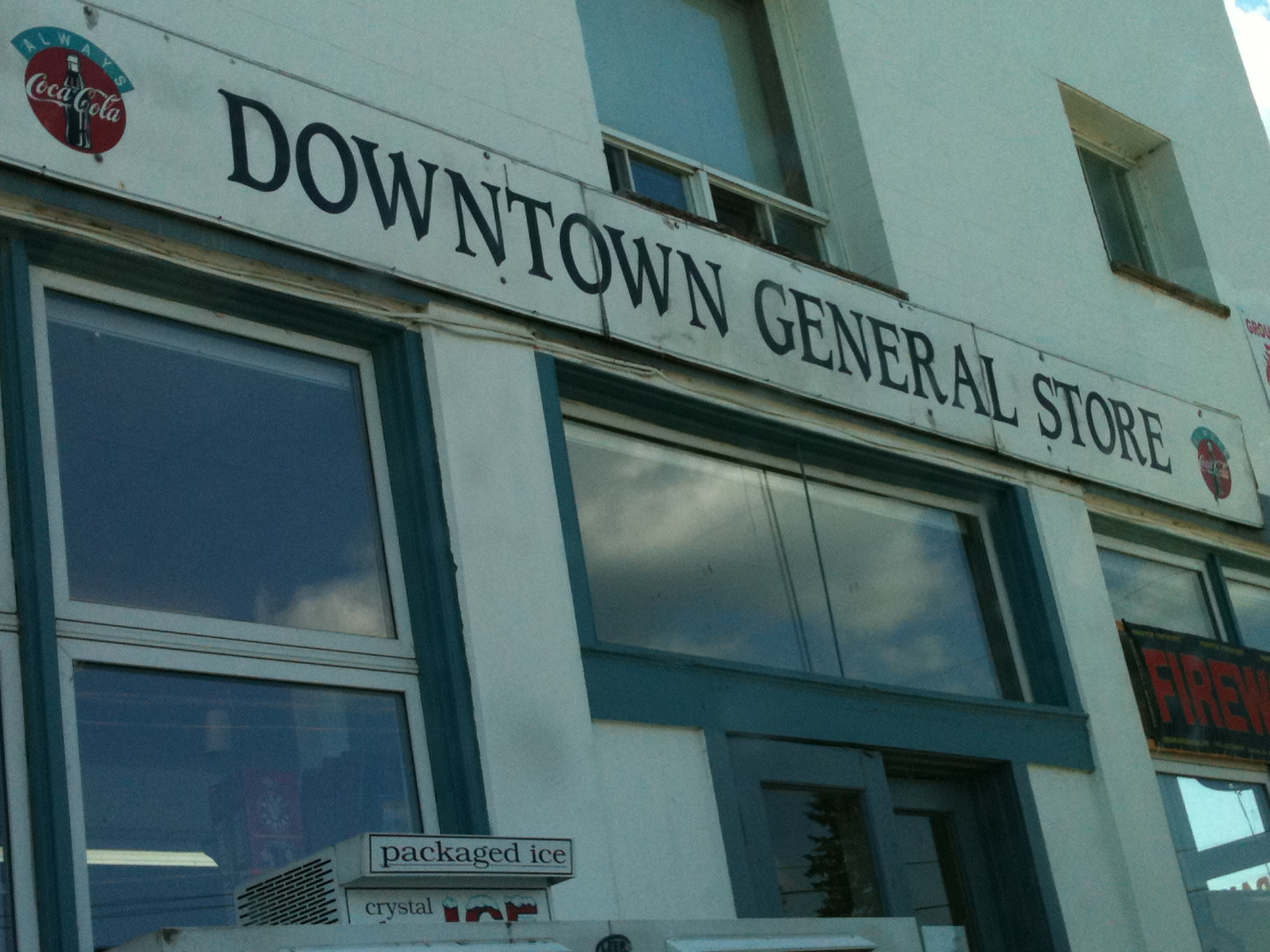
General Store in town until 2011

In the downtown, there is now a brand new general store/restaurant built between 2012 and 2013. Also, there is a museum, Lions Pavilion Park, farmers market, little shops, locks/dams, and a LCBO store. In the village, there is a school, churches, golf course named Ahmic Lake Golf Club, post office, a library, the municipality offices, and the municipality pavilion. Magnetawan is also home to many resorts and rentable cottages.

Following is a list of unique characteristics about this town.

- Echo Rock on Lake Cecebe
- The shipwreck of the steamboat Wenoah in Lake Cecebe
- The Trans Canada Trail
- Hand-operated dam and locks
- Knoepfli and Fagans Falls
- The Lighthouse on the Magnetawan River

== Notable people ==
Barbara Hanley, the first woman ever elected mayor of a community in Canada, was born in Magnetawan in 1882.

== See also ==
- List of townships in Ontario
