= World Conference (World Association of Girl Guides and Girl Scouts) =

Governing body of Girl Guides and Girl Scouts

The World Conference is the governing body of the World Association of Girl Guides and Girl Scouts (WAGGGS) and meets every three years. If a country has more than one association, the associations form a federation for coordination and world representation.

== Background ==
As the Girl Guiding and Girl Scouting movement spread, independent national Guiding associations were set up; however, a need for international cooperation was felt. Lady Baden-Powell founded an informal International Council in London in February 1918. In 1920, two leaders from each known Guide country were invited to the British County Commissioners Conference held at Saint Hugh's College, Oxford. This became known as the First International Conference. The 13th World Conference was held in the same college in 1950. The member organizations continue to meet every three years (initially every two years) at World Conferences.

== Formation of WAGGGS ==
At the fourth World Conference held at Camp Edith Macy in 1926, representatives from several countries suggested the formation of a World Association to take the place of the informal International Council. After the 1926 International Conference the Baden-Powells were approached about setting up a formal association and in 1928 the World Association of Girl Guides and Girl Scouts was founded at the 5th International Conference held in Parád, Hungary. Rose Kerr was Vice Chairman, later Commissioner for Tenderfoot Countries.

== Conferences ==
Year	Name	Location	Notes	Ref
1920	First International Conference	Oxford, England, 23–27 July		
1922	Second International Conference	Cambridge, England, 24 June - 1 July		
1924	Third International Conference	Foxlease, Hampshire, England, 15–23 July		
1926	Fourth International Conference	Camp Edith Macy, New York City, United States		
1928	Fifth International Conference	Parád, Hungary, 10 May	WAGGGS was formed at this conference	
1930	Sixth World Conference	Foxlease, Hampshire, England, 7–9 July		
1932	Seventh World Conference	Bucze, Lower Silesian Voivodeship, Poland		
1934	Eighth World Conference	Adelboden, Switzerland		
1936	Ninth World Conference	Stockholm, Sweden		
1938	Tenth World Conference	Adelboden, Switzerland		
1940			Cancelled due to WWII	
1942			Cancelled due to WWII	
1946	11th World Conference	Evian, France		
1948	12th World Conference	Cooperstown, New York, United States		
1950	13th World Conference	Oxford, England		
1952	14th World Conference	Dombås, Norway		
1954	15th World Conference	Zeist, The Netherlands		
1957	16th World Conference	Petrópolis, Brazil		
1960	17th World Conference	Athens, Greece		
1963	18th World Conference	Nyborg, Denmark		
1966	19th World Conference	Tokyo, Japan		
1969	20th World Conference	Otaniemi, Finland		
1972	21st World Conference	Toronto, Canada		
1975	22nd World Conference	Sussex, England		
1978	23rd World Conference	Tehran, Iran		
1981	24th World Conference	Orléans, France		
1984	25th World Conference	Tarrytown, New York, United States		
1987	26th World Conference	Njoro, Kenya		
1990	27th World Conference	Singapore		
1993	28th World Conference	Nyborg, Denmark		
1996	29th World Conference	Wolfville, Nova Scotia Canada		
1999	30th World Conference	Dublin, Ireland		
2002	31st World Conference	Manila, Philippines		
2005	32nd World Conference	Amman, Jordan		
2008	33rd World Conference	Johannesburg, South Africa	6–12 July	
2011	34th World Conference	Edinburgh, Scotland	11–15 July	
2014	35th World Conference	Hong Kong	5–9 July	
2017	36th World Conference	New Delhi, India	18–22 September	
2021	37th World Conference	Originally scheduled to be held in 2020 in Uganda	Postponed due to the COVID-19 pandemic and held online in July 2021	
2023	38th World Conference	Cyprus		

== Conference details ==
=== 13th World Conference ===
To mark the 1950 conference at Oxford, England, 27 vellum Scrolls of Friendship were created, and the accompanying notebooks were signed by 400,000 people.

=== 15th World Conference ===
At the 15th World Conference it was decided to mark the centenary of the birth of Lord Baden-Powell, the founder of Guiding, by holding a World Camp with four locations – Doe Lake, Ontario, Canada; Quezon City, Philippines; Lac de Conche, Switzerland; and Windsor Great Park, England, from 19 January to 2 February 1957.

=== 33rd World Conference ===
33rd World Conference
- Location: Johannesburg
- Country: South Africa
- Date: 6–12 July 2008

Held from 6 to 12 July 2008 in Johannesburg, South Africa, it was hosted by the Girl Guides Association of South Africa and held in the Birchwood Executive Hotel and Conference Centre. Graça Machel was the keynote speaker and received the World Citizenship Award. Over 450 delegates attended representing 144 countries.

The 33rd World Conference logo combined the WAGGGS logo and the South African Guides chosen pattern. The Girl Guides Association of South Africa wanted to portray their African dream and the sense of unity of all Girl Guides and Girl Scouts. Ten lines within the logo symbolise the ten Laws shared by Girl Guides and Girl Scouts. The three triangles symbolise the threefold Promise. The M shape symbolises the global challenges facing Girl Guiding and Girl Scouting that can be overcome through unity. The conference's theme was "Join in, reach out, change lives".

In her key note address, Machel spoke about her childhood and three women who had a significant impact on her life. She also expressed her views on the contemporary state of women's rights. Deputy President of South Africa, Phumzile Mlambo-Ngcuka, also addressed the meeting.

Graça Machel was presented with the World Citizenship Award. Elspeth Henderson, the outgoing chairman of the World Board, received the WAGGGS Silver Medal, WAGGGS' highest award.

=== 34th World Conference ===
34th World Conference
- Location: Edinburgh
- Country: Scotland
- Date: 11–15 July 2011

Held from 11 to 15 July 2011 in Edinburgh, Scotland, it was hosted by the Girlguiding UK and was held in the Edinburgh Conference Centre at Heriot-Watt University. Over 390 delegates attended representing 122 member organisations. It was the first WAGGGS World Conference to be held in the UK since 1975. The theme of the conference was "100 years changing lives".

UN Women Deputy Director and Assistant Secretary-General, Lakshmi Puri, delivered the keynote address on the first day of the conference, focusing on issues including gender equality and domestic violence.

Six new associations were officially given full member status of WAGGGS during the conference:

- Guides de la République Démocratique du Congo
- Association des Scouts et Guides du Congo
- Girl Guides Association of Cambodia
- Girl Guides Association of Grenada
- Swaziland Girl Guides Association
- Associazione Guide Esploratori Cattolici Sammarinesi (San Marino)
