= Barbara Hanley =

Canadian politician (1882–1959)

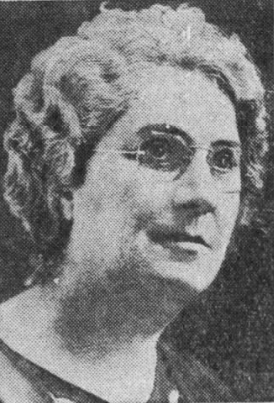

Mayor of Webbwood, Ontario
- In office 1936–1944
- Preceded by: Robert E. Streich
- Succeeded by: C. Dwyer

Personal details
- Born: Barbara McCallum Smith; March 2, 1882 Magnetawan, Ontario, Canada
- Died: January 26, 1959 (aged 76)
- Spouse: Joseph Hanley
- Occupation: teacher

Barbara McCallum Hanley (née Smith, March 2, 1882 – January 26, 1959) was a Canadian politician, who served as mayor of Webbwood, Ontario, from 1936 to 1944. She was the first woman in Canadian history to be elected as a mayor in a general election, although she was preceded by at least one appointed female reeve, Violet Barss in Delia, Alberta.

== Background ==
Born in Magnetawan, Ontario to parents Henry John Smith and Catherine Mitchell, she was educated at the North Bay Normal School and taught in Trout Creek, Emsdale and Chetwynd before moving to Webbwood, 70 km west of Sudbury, in 1908. She married Joseph Hanley, a Canadian Pacific Railway foreman, on 27 August 1913. She subsequently served on the public school board from 1923 to 1935, and then served one year on the town council.

She was also cofounder of a local theatre troupe, the Webbwood Dramatic Society.

She was the niece of Samuel Kedey, who was a mayor of Arnprior in 1902, and the sister of Robert Smith, who served as mayor of Cochrane in 1934-35 and 1944-45.

== Mayoralty ==
On January 6, 1936, Hanley defeated Robert E. Streich in Webbwood's mayoral election. She garnered 82 votes to Streich's 69. Early media coverage focused on the question of whether she would continue her housekeeping duties while serving as mayor, to which she responded that "Webbwood is hardly a big enough place for me to give up my housework just to be mayor." She was formally sworn into office on January 13, although the first meeting of the new council had to be postponed due to a snowstorm.

Her key election priority had been the provision of poverty relief due to the Great Depression. In one of her first acts as mayor, she supported a resolution which suspended the salaries of Webbwood's mayor and council, in order to help fund a program to buy Christmas turkeys for struggling families. Over her first year in office, the town also undertook repairs to the local jail and school facilities, erected the town's first traffic lights, and closed the local dog pound.

She was named one of that year's outstanding women by The New York Sun; she was the only Canadian named to the list, alongside figures such as Wallis Simpson, Florence Prag Kahn, Irène Joliot-Curie, Cécile Brunschvicg, Sally Salminen, Ruth Bryan Owen and Mary Ritter Beard. She disliked being included in the same list as Simpson, but otherwise took the honour in good spirits.

At the end of the year, as she announced that she would stand for reelection, she stated that "I won't say that I have done better than any man would, but I will say I have done equally well." Asked if she was convinced, after a year in office, that there was a place for women in public life, she responded that "the very fact I am in the work gives my answer to that." The two primary criticisms she faced in her second election campaign focused on her gender and on allegations that she had been too generous in her relief plans for poor and unemployed residents of the town. Her position was that she offered no apology for either criticism, although she then faced some additional controversy for a comment which singled out bachelor men as being uniquely ill-equipped to judge the abilities of women.

She faced Streich for a second time in the 1937 election, winning by a slightly larger margin of 86 votes to Streich's 66. In the same election, her husband Joseph was acclaimed to a seat on the school board. In her second year in office, she declared the entire council as a relief committee, and championed projects that would enhance and beautify the town, including the creation of public vegetable and flower gardens.

During World War II, she also served as chair of the local rations chapter of the Wartime Prices and Trade Board.

She served as mayor of Webbwood until 1944, winning eight consecutive elections, sometimes by acclamation. In 1941, for the first and only time in her career her main election challenger was another woman; three men had been nominated without their consent against her, but all withdrew and ran for council seats instead.

After stepping down as mayor in 1944, she served as town clerk from 1946 until 1950.

== Retirement ==
Once she retired from municipal politics, she championed the establishment of a home for the aged in Sudbury, serving on the Sudbury District Home for the Aged. In part, her efforts on the committee led to the opening of Pioneer Manor in Sudbury in 1953. She also spoke out against the forced sterilization of people with developmental disabilities, and encouraged young women to pursue professional careers.

Hanley died on January 26, 1959, in Sudbury. She was buried in her hometown of Burk's Falls.

== Historical status ==
She remains the longest-serving mayor in the history of Webbwood, which was dissolved into the larger municipality of Sables-Spanish Rivers in 1998.

Hanley's daughter, Ella Clifford Scutt, maintained a scrapbook of her mother's career accomplishments, which she donated to the Laurentian University archives in 1967. Due to a fire at Webbwood's municipal building, the town's own records from Hanley's time in office have been lost, and the Laurentian holdings are the main extant source for primary documentation of Hanley's career.

In 1967, Webbwood's then-mayor Dallas Wood confirmed to The Globe and Mail that the town had never undertaken any serious effort to commemorate Hanley's historic significance, such as naming a street after her or declaring a special event in her honour. He did indicate that he planned to write a letter to the provincial government requesting the installment of a historic plaque in front of the town's new municipal office. A community billboard along Highway 17 at the entrance to Webbwood currently commemorates Hanley's status.

In the early 2010s, Canada's federal government rejected a proposal to formally designate Hanley as a Person of National Historic Significance, on the grounds that simply being the first of something was not necessarily a sufficient condition by itself for being named to the registry. Her historic significance has sometimes been overlooked by media as well, with both Marjorie Hamilton in Barrie (elected 1950) and Charlotte Whitton in Ottawa (elected 1951) having been erroneously credited as Canada's or Ontario's first woman mayor.

Mike Commito, a history instructor at Laurentian University, was commissioned to write an article about Hanley for The Canadian Encyclopedia in 2015.
