= Scouting in the Congo =

Scouting in the Congo can refer to:

- Scouting in the Democratic Republic of the Congo
- Scouting in the Republic of the Congo
