= Lake Cecebe =

Lake in Ontario, Canada

- Location within Ontario Location within Canada
- Location: Parry Sound District, Ontario
- Coordinates: 45°38′30″N 79°34′24″W
- Primary inflows: Magnetawan River
- Primary outflows: Magnetawan River
- Basin countries: Canada
- Surface area: 7 km^{2} (2.7 sq mi)
- Max. depth: 19.5 m (64 ft)
- Shore length^{1}: 15 km (9.3 mi)
- Surface elevation: 281 m (922 ft)
- Settlements: Cecebe; Magnetawan; Midlothian; Port Carmen; Rockwynn
- ^{1} Shore length is not a well-defined measure.

Lake Cecebe is a lake in the Almaguin Highlands region of the Parry Sound District, Ontario, Canada. Lake Cecebe is part of the Magnetawan River waterway. The lake has over 20 miles of shoreline. The village of Burk's Falls is located upstream of Lake Cecebe on the Magnetawan River and the historic village of Magnetawan, Ontario is located where the river exits Lake Cecebe and flows into Ahmic Lake.

The communities of Midlothian, Cecebe, Rockwynn, Port Carmen, and Magnetawan can all be found on the lake.

At the outflow of Lake Cecebe a hand-operated lock and dam system between Lake Cecebe and Ahmic Lake can be found. These locks were built in 1886.

== See also ==
- List of lakes in Ontario
