= FESCO =

FESCO may refer to:

- Faisalabad Electric Supply Company
- Far East Shipping Company
- Fédération des Scouts de la République démocratique du Congo
- Fesco Transport Group
- Forum of European Securities Commissions
