= Old Man's Lake =

Lake in Ontario, Canada

- Location within Ontario
- Location: Ontario
- Coordinates: 45.6086188°N 79.643506°W
- Basin countries: Canada
- Surface area: 91.4 ha (226 acres)
- Max. depth: 8.8 m (29 ft)
- Shore length^{1}: 6.0 km (3.7 mi)
- Islands: 0
- ^{1} Shore length is not a well-defined measure.

Old Man's Lake, also known as Bilsland Lake, is a small lake near Magnetawan, in the Almaguin Highlands, Parry Sound District, Ontario, Canada. It is spring fed and hosts a handful of cottages. The lake drains over a small waterfall into Ahmic Lake.

Old Man's Lake received its name because, the story goes, the area once was divided into three large farms. Two farms were owned by two sons and the “Old Man” had the other. His house was on the east shore. The farm still exists today (although it is much smaller).

== Ecology ==
Old Man's Lake has a diverse fish population including smallmouth bass and yellow perch.

== See also ==
- List of lakes in Ontario
