= Doe Lake (Parry Sound District) =

Lake in Parry Sound District, Ontario, Canada

- Location within Ontario Location within Canada
- Location: Parry Sound District, Ontario
- Coordinates: 45°32′35″N 79°24′55″W
- Primary outflows: Magnetawan River
- Basin countries: Canada
- Settlements: Doe Lake, Katrine

Doe Lake is a lake in Parry Sound District, Ontario, Canada. The lake is composed of three sections and as such known locally for their size as Big Doe Lake, Middle Doe Lake, and Little Doe Lake. Doe Lake is the largest lake in the Almaguin Highlands area of the Magnetawan River system.

The communities of Katrine and Doe Lake can be found on the Lake. The community of Katrine has a small marina and is found on the Little Doe section of the lake. However Doe Lake is a classified as a dispersed rural community found in the area.

Many cottages can be found on the lake as well as rental cottages and camping resorts.

== Summer Camps ==
Various summer camps operate or have operated on the lake. These camps include:

- Doe Lake Girl Guide Camp (Girl Guides of Canada)
  - Founded in 1949 on 625 acres
  - The Doe Lake Girl Guide Camp is held every summer with girls travelling to the camp from across Ontario, and other parts of Canada.
- Big Doe Camp

== Girl Guides and Girl Scouts World Camp ==
At the 15th World Conference of WAGGGS it was decided to mark the centenary of the birth of Lord Baden-Powell, the founder of Guiding, by holding a World Camp with four locations — Doe Lake, Ontario; Quezon City, Philippines; Lac de Conche, Switzerland; and Windsor Great Park, England, from January 19 to February 2, 1957.

== Fish species ==
- Walleye
- Northern Pike
- Smallmouth Bass
- Largemouth Bass
- Perch
- Whitefish

== See also ==
- List of lakes in Ontario
