= Agnes Boden =

English charity worker and Girl Guide executive

Agnes Boden MBE
- Born: Agnes Leila Mildred Boden; 29 November 1894; Sutton, Surrey, England
- Died: 6 November 1967 (aged 72); Nottingham, England

Agnes Boden MBE (29 November 1894 – 6 November 1967) was a Girl Guide executive in Nottinghamshire. She was awarded an MBE for services to Guiding in 1957. She was associated with the Nottingham Cripples Guild for almost 25 years.

== Personal life and education ==
Agnes was born to Rev Charles John Boden and Mildred Louise Mary née Wollaston. She had two sisters. Boden served with the Red Cross during WWII. She worked as an administrative officer of the Nottingham Orthopaedic Clinic. She lived with Mary Hewitt (1895-1960), her close friend, at Barrack Lane, Nottingham, until Hewitt's death.

== Girl Guides ==
Boden started the 1st Nuttall Guide company in 1919, which she ran until at least 1939. She also worked with "crippled Guides" in Nottinghamshire hospitals. She went on to hold many appointments within the Girl Guide movement, including Nottingham division commissioner for five years and assistant county commissioner for ten years.

In 1944 she introduced the Trefoil Guild to Nottinghamshire Guiding, for ex-Guides and Rangers who had aged out of the movement. In July 1950 she added her name to a Scroll of Friendship which had travelled from an "outlying Guide post" overseas and was making its way to the international Guide rally in Oxford later that month. While she was division commissioner for Nottingham (Forest), she was awarded an MBE for service to Guiding in 1957.

Boden retired from Guiding because of ill health in 1962. Guides from Nottinghamshire created a guard of honour for her funeral at All Saints' Church, Nottingham in 1967.

== Charity work ==
Boden was secretary of the Nottingham Cripples' Guild for nearly 25 years. She was a founding member of the Nottingham Standing Conference of Youth Organisations. She was a member of the Soroptimist International and was a 'house-mother' at one their homes for several years. She co-organised the Infantile Paralysis Fellowship.
