= ASGC =

ASGC may refer to:

- ASGC Construction (Al Shafar General Contracting Construction)
- Association des Scouts et Guides du Congo
- Australasian Society of Genetic Counsellors
