= GRDC =

GRDC may refer to:

- Geographic Resources for Development Center, Nigeria
- Geological Research and Development Center, Indonesia
- Georgian Reconstruction and Development Company, Georgia
- Global Runoff Data Centre, Germany
- Grains Research and Development Corporation, Australia
- Guides de la République Démocratique du Congo
