= Magnetawan (former village) =

- Community
- Interactive map of Magnetawan
- Location in Ontario Magnetawan (Ontario)
- Coordinates: 45°39′56″N 79°38′39″W
- Country: Canada
- Province: Ontario
- District: Parry Sound
- Municipality: Magnetawan

Area
  - Total: 1.57 km^{2} (0.61 sq mi)
- Elevation: 289 m (948 ft)

Population (2021)
  - Total: 268
  - Density: 171/km^{2} (442/sq mi)
- Time zone: UTC-5 (EST)
  - Summer (DST): UTC-4 (EDT)
- Area codes: 705, 249, 683

Magnetawan is an unincorporated community in Ontario, Canada that previously held village status. It is currently part of the similarly named Municipality of Magnetawan which was established from the village, the hamlet of Ahmic Harbour, and the townships of Chapman, Croft, and Spence in 1998. It is recognized as a designated place by Statistics Canada.

== Demographics ==
In the 2021 Census of Population conducted by Statistics Canada, Magnetawan had a population of 268 living in 125 of its 156 total private dwellings, a change of 3.5% from its 2016 population of 259. With a land area of 1.57 km^{2} (0.61 sq mi), it had a population density of 170.7/km^{2} (442.1/sq mi) in 2021.

== See also ==
- List of communities in Ontario
- List of designated places in Ontario
