= Anglican High School (Grenada) =

School in St. George's, Grenada

Coordinates: 12.0493°N 61.7453°W

Anglican High School, formerly known as the Church of England High School is a secondary girls' school located in St. George's, Grenada. It is one of eighteen secondary schools located on the Caribbean island of Grenada and was founded in 1916.

== History ==
The Church of England High School was founded in 1916 by Archdeacon Walton as a private Anglican school located at Bachelor Hall on Simmons Alley and had three staff members and nineteen students. In the early days of the school, students paid for their schooling, entering at the grammar school level and continuing through secondary education. The school relocated to the Lamollie House on Church street, where currently the CIBC FirstCaribbean International Bank is located and moved again to a building on the site of the Grenada Boys' Secondary School between 1946 and 1952. Coinciding with the move in 1946, the school changed its name to Anglican High School and became solely a secondary educational facility. In September 1952, the school was established at the location on Tanteen Road. In 1957, the school was expanded to a two-storey concrete structure.

In October 1972, during the unrest precipitated by discussions with Great Britain over Grenada's independence, the school was destroyed by fire. Student protests, demanded inquiries into the fire, which left its 450 students without a facility. The public works employees were ordered to make repairs to an abandoned government school on Melville Street to temporarily house the students. Parents and teachers rejected the proposal. Construction began on a new facility in early 1973. The facility was destroyed again in 2004, when Hurricane Ivan struck the island. The Anglican High School Past Pupil Association and the Grenadian government worked together to rebuild the two-storey structure, and through the years have completed several expansions to the property. Some of the most recent additions included a library and an upgrade to the food and nutrition laboratory.

== Curriculum ==
From 1916 to the 1950s, the curriculum of the school included biology and general science, British history, geography, literature, mathematics, religion and a variety of language courses—English, French, Latin and Spanish. In the 1960s, Caribbean and European history were added and in the 1970s the curriculum expanded to include chemistry and physics, family life education, as well as cookery, music, sewing and physical education. The school currently offers 21 subjects including those mentioned previously, as well as accounting, business and office administration, information technology, and technical drawing.

== Extracurricular activities ==
The school, one of eighteen secondary schools in Grenada, excels in sporting activities and has been the Girls' Division Champion of the Inter-Collegiate games eighteen times. Its most recent victory was in 2017.

In 1925, The Girl Guides Association of Grenada was founded at the school, and continues to be one of several clubs and associations in which students of the school participate.
