= Magnetawan Lake =

Lake in Ontario, Canada

- Location within Ontario
- Location: Algonquin Provincial Park, Nipissing District, Ontario, Canada
- Coordinates: 45°39′46″N 78°59′12″W
- Basin countries: Canada

Magnetawan Lake (French: lac Magnetawan) is a lake in Nipissing District, Ontario, Canada. Magnetawan Lake is located just within the boundaries of Algonquin Provincial Park. Being located in the park the lake and its surroundings are protected. Magnetawan Lake also serves as an access point into Algonquin Park with a parking lot located on the shore acting as an entrance point for many canoeists. Algonquin Park Canoe routes pass through the lake and four campsites can be found on the shore as well as two portages. The two portages 340 m and 125 m found on Magnetawan Lake connect this lake with Little Eagle Lake and Hambone Lake respectively.

Magnetawan Lake is the source of the Magnetawan River.

== See also ==
- Algonquin Provincial Park
- Magnetawan River
- List of lakes in Ontario

== References & Sources ==
- Atlas of Canada - Magnetawan Lake
