= Lac de Conche =

Lake in Valais, Switzerland

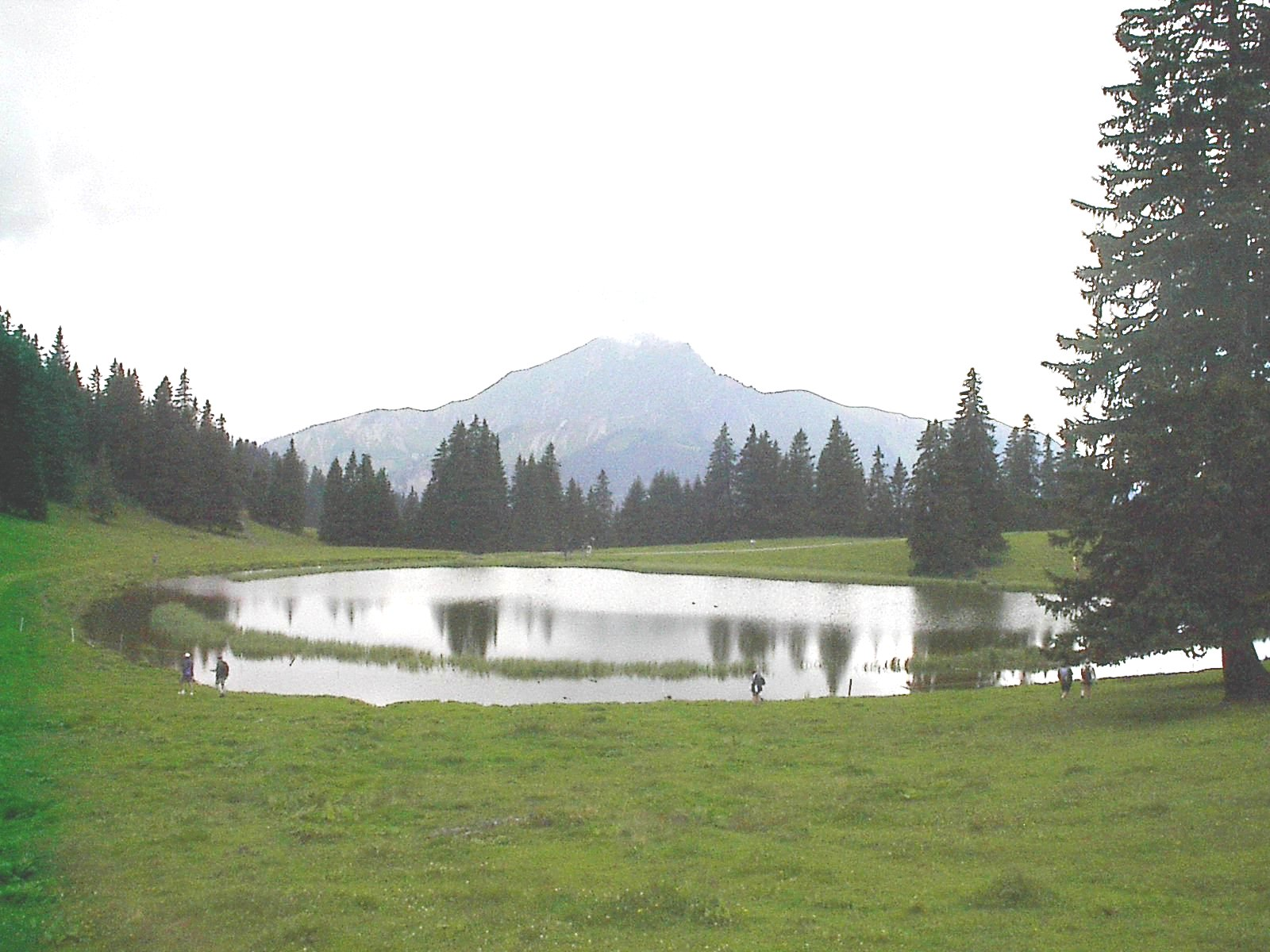

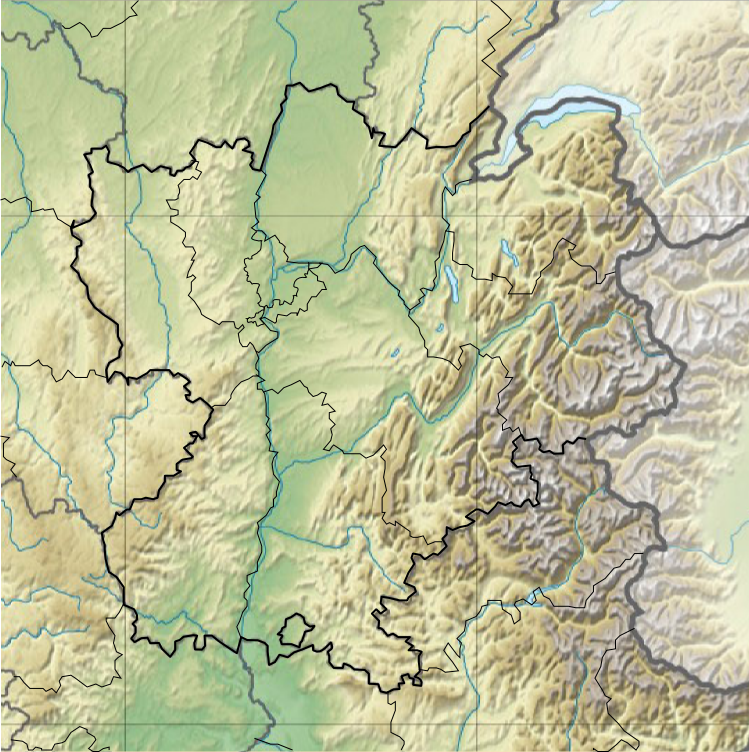
- Location within Canton of Valais Location within Rhône-Alpes Location within Switzerland Location within France Location within Alps
- Interactive map of Lac de Conche
- Location: Collombey-Muraz, Valais
- Coordinates: 46°15′53″N 6°51′45″E
- Basin countries: Switzerland
- Surface area: 0.48 ha (1.2 acres)
- Surface elevation: 1,687 m (5,535 ft)

Lac de Conche is a lake in the canton of Valais, Switzerland. It is located in the municipality of Collombey-Muraz, at an elevation of 1687 m, close to the French border.

== Girl Guides and Girl Scouts World Camp ==
At the 15th World Conference of WAGGGS it was decided to mark the centenary of the birth of Lady Baden-Powell, the founder of Guiding, by holding a World Camp with four locations — Doe Lake, Ontario, Canada; Quezon City, Philippines; Lac de Conche; and Windsor Great Park, England, from January 19 to February 2, 1957.
