= Scouting and Guiding in the Republic of the Congo =

Scouting and Guiding associations in Congo

Congolese Scout troop, prior to 1960

Congolese Scout, circa 1968

The Scout and Guide movement in the Republic of the Congo is served by at least thirteen associations. Five of them form the Conseil du Scoutisme congolais (Council of the Congolese Scout Mouvement):

- Association des Scouts et Guides du Congo, member of the World Association of Girl Guides and Girl Scouts
- Association des Eclaireurs kimbanguistes du Congo (Kimbanguist)
- Eclaireurs pluralistes du Congo
- Eclaireurs salutistes du Congo (Salvation Army)
- Eclaireurs unionistes du Congo (Protestant)

Among the independent organizations are:

- Eclaireurs communautaires du Congo
- Eclaireurs d'Afrique
- Eclaireurs du Congo
- Eclaireurs Louzolo Amour
- Eclaireurs neutres du Congo (interreligious)
- Eclaireuses et Eclaireurs libres du Congo-Brazzaville (laic)

The umbrella organization Scoutisme Congolais (formerly Mouvement du Scoutisme Congolais) was recognized as a full member of the World Organization of the Scout Movement in August 2023.

== History ==
Scouting was founded in French Equatorial Africa in 1941, but was banned during the long Marxist period. Guiding was introduced to the Republic of the Congo in 1927, and became a member of the World Association of Girl Guides and Girl Scouts in 1957, and again in 1996 after the renewal of the organization.

The Eclaireurs Neutres du Congo were founded by the Eclaireurs Neutres de France, a French non-aligned Scouting organization, in 2004.

== Motto ==
The Scout Motto is Sois Prêt (Be Prepared) or Toujours Prêt (Always Prepared) in French, depending on the organization.

== Emblems ==
Conseil du Scoutisme Congolais

Eclaireurs Neutres du Congo

== See also ==
- Scouting and Guiding in the Democratic Republic of the Congo
