= Scroll of Friendship =

Scroll and logbook

- Material: Vellum
- Writing: English
- Created: 1950
- Present location: Various, including London

The Girl Guide's Scroll of Friendship (also known as the Message of Friendship) was created with the intention of making the 13th World Conference held in Oxford more impactful to the Guides who attended in July 1950. Inspired by the journey of the Olympic flame, in the months prior to the conference a set of 27 scrolls and logbooks taken around the British Isles. The logbooks were signed by 400,000 people. During the conference, scrolls and logbooks were presented to representatives of every one of the 27 countries in attendance.

== The scroll and logbooks ==
Each vellum scroll read: "The Guides of the British Isles, who are happy to have as their guests at this time the members of the 13th World Conference, send this scroll as a token of friendship to their sister Guides in [country]. May many exchange visits between the two countries be possible in the coming years." Each scroll was uniquely illustrated.

Two logbooks accompanied each scroll. One was signed by everyone who handled the scrolls, amounting to around 400,000 names. These included the names of Girl Guides, leaders, transportation staff and celebrities. The second was illustrated with routes taken, photos, illustrations and items of interest from areas they passed through, including The Jolly Fisherman from Skegness, the Seal of the Chapter of Brechin Cathedral and the Nuneaton coat of arms.

== The routes ==
As the scrolls and logbooks were carried around Britain they were relayed between Brownies, Guides, Rangers and Sea Rangers, with dedication ceremonies held at each handover point. The scrolls were carried by as many different forms of transport as possible, including river, rail, road, horseback, bicycle, roller skate, scooter, trek cart, wheel-chair, tractor, bus, foot, governess cart, cable, jeep, skiff, model airplane, canal boat, parachute, donkey, dog, mechanical caddie, whaler, elephant, milk cart, hitch-hiking, relay runners, and at Scout pace.

As part of each dedication ceremony there was a short 'challenge' which were different at each point but went along the lines of: [In Buckinghamshire] "Stand and deliver. What is your business?" "We are taking this to Pakistan" or [In Kent] "Halt! Who goes there?" "A messenger for the Girl Guides of Brazil" "By what route do you travel?" "Along the Pilgrims' Way."

== Conference ==
During the conference's final campfire, which was attended by 10,000 people, Sea Ranger Commodore, Princess Margaret and Chief Guide, Olave Baden-Powell presented the scrolls to representatives of the 27 countries in attendance "as a gesture of friendship and amity between the nations."

The nations included: Australia, Belgium, Brazil, Canada, Costa Rica, Denmark, Egypt, Finland, France, Greece, Guatemala, Haiti, India, Ireland, Lichtenstein, Luxembourg, Mexico, Netherlands, New Zealand, Norway, Pakistan, South Africa, Switzerland and United States of America.

== After the conference ==
After returning to their home countries, the Guides shared the scrolls and logbooks with their local Guiding community. The Girl Guides of Canada toured their scroll 50,000 miles around the country, which inspired Canadian Guides to create their own logbook, with pages contributed by Guides from every province. This was then flown to the UK and was toured around Hampshire, Middlesex, Buckinghamshire and Berkshire, ending up at the London headquarters, where it "found an honoured resting place."

A film about the event, Journey of Goodwill, was shown to Girl Guides, and the Girl Guide Association printed a version of the scroll, which, together with a poem by John Masefield written for the occasion and a map showing the route of each scroll, was available to buy.

In October 1950 Olave Baden-Powell wrote of the event "this has certainly been quite one of our most enchanting and exciting co-operative episodes in our [40 year] history."
