= Fédération des Scouts de la République démocratique du Congo =

Scouting movement in Congo

- Federation of Scouts of the Democratic Republic of the Congo
- Country: Democratic Republic of the Congo
- Founded: 1924
- Membership: 71,486
- Chief Commissioner: Gilbert Mussumba
- Affiliation: World Organization of the Scout Movement

The Fédération des Scouts de la République démocratique du Congo (FESCO), the national federation of eleven Scouting organizations of the Democratic Republic of the Congo, was founded in 1924, and became a member of the World Organization of the Scout Movement (WOSM) first in 1963 and again in 1981. The coeducational Fédération des Scouts de la République démocratique du Congo has 71,486 members as of 2010.

Scouting was banned in the Congo in 1967 by the government, and was restarted in the late 1970s. In 1981, the Organisations des Eclaireurs du Zaïre (OEZA) was readmitted to the WOSM. In 1990, the OEZA changed its structure and was renamed Fédération des Scouts du Zaïre (FSZ), the direct predecessor of the present FESCO.

The FESCO consists of eleven regional national Scout associations, reflecting the structure of the country. There was a general meeting in 2004 of all the Scout Associations with the intention of helping pave the way for creating a single national Scout association.

== Program ==
The federations works in four branches:

- Louveteaux (Cub Scouts) — ages 6 to 12
- Scouts — ages 13 to 17
- Aînés (Senior Scouts) — ages 18 to 20
- Routiers (Rover Scouts) — ages 20 to 25

The Scouts are service-oriented. They are a non-denominational organization and open to all youngsters. Scouts have promoted primary health care and community development. Scouts have built bridges and buildings, repaired schools, cleaned dispensaries and organized hygiene and nutrition campaigns.

The Scout Motto is Uwe Tayari, Be Prepared in Swahili, and Sois Prêt (Be Prepared) or Toujours Prêt, Always Prepared in French, depending on the organization. The Scout emblem incorporates an earlier variant of the coat of arms of the Democratic Republic of the Congo.

== Regional associations ==
Among the regional members of FESCO are:

- Association des Scouts du Sud-Kivu (ASSK)
- Association des Scouts du Nord-Kivu (ASNK)

=== Scouting in Katanga ===

Scouts existed in the breakaway State of Katanga prior to its reabsorption into Congo in 1963, but it was never recognized by WOSM.

== See also ==
- Scouting in the Democratic Republic of the Congo

== Literature ==
- Samuel Tilman (1998). "Le scoutisme au Congo belge (1922-1960): une école de l'élite pour les jeunes indigènes" (PDF). Revue Belge d'Histoire Contemporaine (in French). XXVIII (3–4): 363–404. Archived from the original (PDF) on 19 March 2009.
