= Armour, Ontario =

Township in Ontario, Canada

Armour
- Township (single-tier)
- Township of Armour
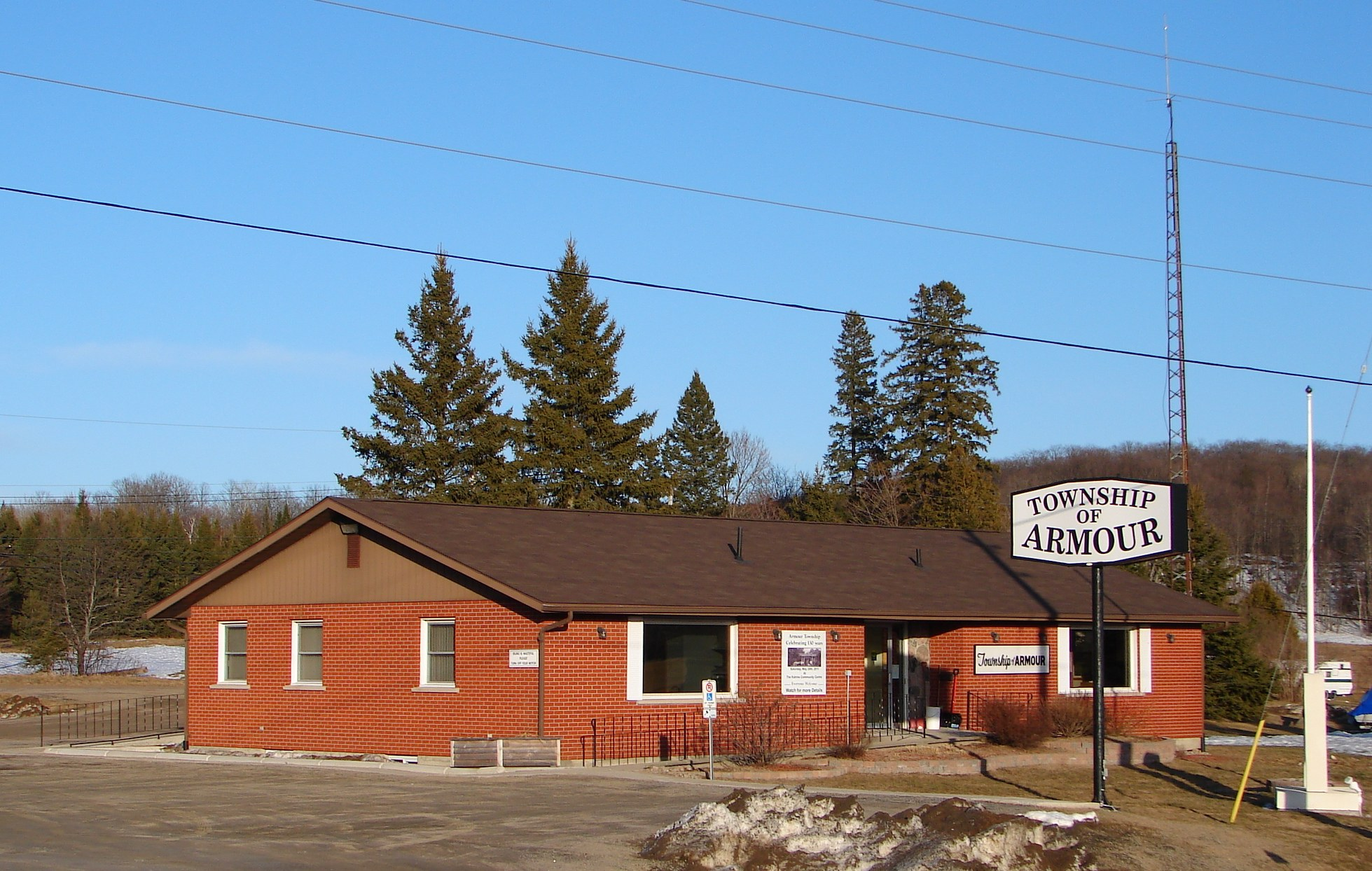
- Municipal office, 2011
- Etymology: John Douglas Armour.
- Location in Southern Ontario
- Coordinates: 45°37′44″N 79°20′38″W
- Country: Canada
- Province: Ontario
- District: Parry Sound
- Incorporated: 1881

Government
  - Type: Township
  - Mayor: Rod Ward
  - MP: Scott Aitchison (CPC)
  - MPP: Graydon Smith (OPC)

Area
  - Land: 163.52 km^{2} (63.14 sq mi)

Population (2021)
  - Total: 1,459
  - Density: 8.9/km^{2} (23/sq mi)
- Time zone: UTC-5 (EST)
  - Summer (DST): UTC-4 (EDT)
- Postal code span: P0A
- Area codes: 705, 249
- Website: www.armourtownship.ca

Armour is a township in the Canadian province of Ontario.

Located in the Almaguin Highlands region of Parry Sound District, the township surrounds but does not include the village of Burk's Falls. It was named in honour of Judge John Douglas Armour.

== Communities ==
The township includes the communities of Berriedale, Carss, Chetwynd, Katrine and Pickerel Lake.

Katrine overlooks Doe Lake, which is located on the west side of the village. Three Mile Lake and Deer Lake are located about 5 km east of the village. There is also a small public beach on Doe Lake, and a community centre located on Ontario Highway 11.

== History ==
Armour Township was established as part of The Free Grants and Homestead Act in 1868, which encouraged settlement of the area. In 1881, it was incorporated, with James Coleman as its first reeve.

In 1885, the Grand Trunk Railway was built through Armour.

In 1890, the Village of Burk's Falls split off from the township to form a separate village municipality.

In 1916, Highway 11 was built through the township.

== Demographics ==
In the 2021 Census of Population conducted by Statistics Canada, Armour had a population of 1,459 living in 667 of its 1,087 total private dwellings, a change of 3.2% from its 2016 population of 1,414. With a land area of 163.52 km^{2} (63.14 sq mi), it had a population density of 8.9/km^{2} (23.1/sq mi) in 2021.

Historical census populations – Armour, Ontario

Year	Pop.	±%
1881	1,203	—
1891	2,171	+80.5%
1901	915	−57.9%
1911	1,099	+20.1%
1921	963	−12.4%
1931	871	−9.6%
1941	776	−10.9%
1951	815	+5.0%

Year	Pop.	±%
1956	784	−3.8%
1961	788	+0.5%
1966	777	−1.4%
1971	842	+8.4%
1976	927	+10.1%
1981	933	+0.6%
1986	1,045	+12.0%
1991	1,403	+34.3%

Year	Pop.	±%
1996	1,464	+4.3%
2001	1,326	−9.4%
2006	1,249	−5.8%
2011	1,372	+9.8%
2016	1,414	+3.1%
2021	1,459	+3.2%

Population counts are not adjusted for boundary changes.
Source: Statistics Canada

Mother tongue (2021):

- English as first language: 93.5%
- French as first language: 1.7%
- English and French as first languages: 0%
- Other as first language: 4.5%

== See also ==
- List of municipalities in Ontario
- List of townships in Ontario
