= The Girl Guides Association of Grenada =

National guiding organization of Grenada

- Location: PO Box 626, St. George's
- Country: Grenada
- Founded: November 25, 1925
- Membership: 2,288 (2012)
- Patron: Dame Cecile La Grenade, Governor General of Grenada
- President: Deborah Baveghems
- Chief Commissioner: Tamara Savoury
- Affiliation: World Association of Girl Guides and Girl Scouts

The Girl Guides Association of Grenada (GGAG) is the national guiding organization of Grenada. It serves 2288 members as of 2012. Founded in November 1925, at the Anglican High School (formerly Church of England High School), the girls-only organization became an associate member of the World Association of Girl Guides and Girl Scouts (WAGGGS) in 1990. It became a full member in 2011 at the 34th World Conference - Edinburgh, Scotland, United Kingdom, 11–15 July 2011.

== History ==
The first Girl Guide company in Grenada was set up at the Anglican High School (formerly Church of England High School) in November 1925. Other Guide companies were soon formed. Brownie packs were introduced in 1927 and the first Ranger Guide company in 1928. Guiding had thrived in these early years and presently there are companies in every parish, the majority of which operate within schools.

On January 31, 1951, Olave Baden Powell visited Grenada.

In 1985 the Association held its first international camp, attended by neighbouring Caribbean Associations. During the next few years, trainers and advisers from WAGGGS visited Grenada to help the association develop.

In 1989 the first Rainbow unit was started in Birchgrove in the parish of St. Andrew.

== Sections ==
There are five sections within the Girl Guides Association of Grenada: Rainbows, Brownies, Girl Guides, Ranger Guides and Young Leaders. The programme is based on an eight-point system incorporating physical fitness, the mind, outdoors enjoyment, homecraft skills, service to others, human relations, creativity and character.

The ages of each section are as follows:

- Rainbows - ages 4 to 7
- Brownies - ages 7 to 11
- Girl Guides - ages 10 to 16
- Rangers - ages 15 to 25
- Young Leaders - ages 16 to 23

== Community projects ==
The Association is involved in various service projects and intends to extend its involvement in community development.

== Affiliates ==
The Girl Guides Association of Grenada works closely with local and regional social development organizations and NGOs on advocacy projects and WAGGGS initiatives. Affiliates include:

- Grenada National Organization for Women (GNOW)
- The Scout Association of Grenada
- The Rotary Club of Grenada
- The St. George's Lions Club
- The Conference of Churches in Grenada

Grenada belongs to the Caribbean Link for Guiding set up for the purpose of mutual development and consultation among member organization in the Caribbean.

== Regional activity ==
Grenada hosted the 15th Western Hemisphere Regional Conference in 2019.

== Leadership structure ==
The council, led by the President, is the governing body of the Girl Guides Association of Grenada. It is formed by an elected executive, the Chief Commissioner, and commissioners. Members of the council are expected to sit on at least one sub-committee.

The executive committee is a standing sub-committee of the council. It is led by the Chief Commissioner; the Council Secretary, the Treasurer, and Commissioners sit on the executive committee.

== See also ==
- The Scout Association of Grenada
