= The Scout Association of Grenada =

National Scouting organization of Grenada

- Location: Belmont, Saint George's
- Country: Grenada
- Membership: 1,378

The Scout Association of Grenada, the national Scouting organization of Grenada, was founded in 1924, and became a member of the World Organization of the Scout Movement in 1979. This coeducational association has 1,378 members as of 2011.

The Scout emblem features a budding nutmeg, the national symbol.

== Caribbean Cuboree ==
Grenada hosted the 4th and 10th Caribbean Cuborees, in 1985 and 2004 respectively.

== See also ==
- The Girl Guides Association of Grenada
