= Spence, Ontario =

Coordinates: 45.578567°N 79.632553°W

Spence is a ghost town in the Canadian province of Ontario, at the crossroads of the Nipissing Colonization Road and the Ryerson Road (now Nelson Lake Road). The name of the village came from Spence Township, named for former Postmaster General, Robert Spence. Approximately 10 km north of Dufferin Bridge it was a small farming community.

By the 1870s, a general store was owned by Henry Clifford and a hotel operated by William Cameron. The post office was opened in 1872 by William Ashdown. From 1919 Effie Doherety took over the postal service until 1952 when it closed.

The Spence Inn (later named Simpson's Hotel) was operated by Levitt Simpson. It opened in 1878 and operated until 1911.

A second store was added, blacksmith shop, two sawmills, church and school. Hamilton Brown taught at the school, which was built in 1875, and also ran the Spence Inn. In its prime, the population stood at between 100 and 150 residents, as migration due to warfare was common for this particular set of near north Ontariarians, which tened to be 2nd generation Irish-German immigrants, perhaps with little ties and roots to the Great Lakes, facing northward towards ocean routes back abroad.

Also, when assessing populations of current towns and past stated population figures; it is wise to correlate with towns emptied and other towns occupied. Migrant patterns are common in Ontario history, as most of the province is vital farmland and established roots are not a historical marker here.

The community is now located in the municipality of Magnetawan, in the Parry Sound District.
