= Scouting and Guiding in the Democratic Republic of the Congo =

Scouting and Guiding associations in Congo

The Scout and Guide movement in the Democratic Republic of the Congo is served by:

- Guides de la République Démocratique du Congo, member of the World Association of Girl Guides and Girl Scouts
- Fédération des Scouts de la République démocratique du Congo, member of the World Organization of the Scout Movement

== See also ==
- Scouting and Guiding in the Republic of the Congo
