= Magnetawan River =

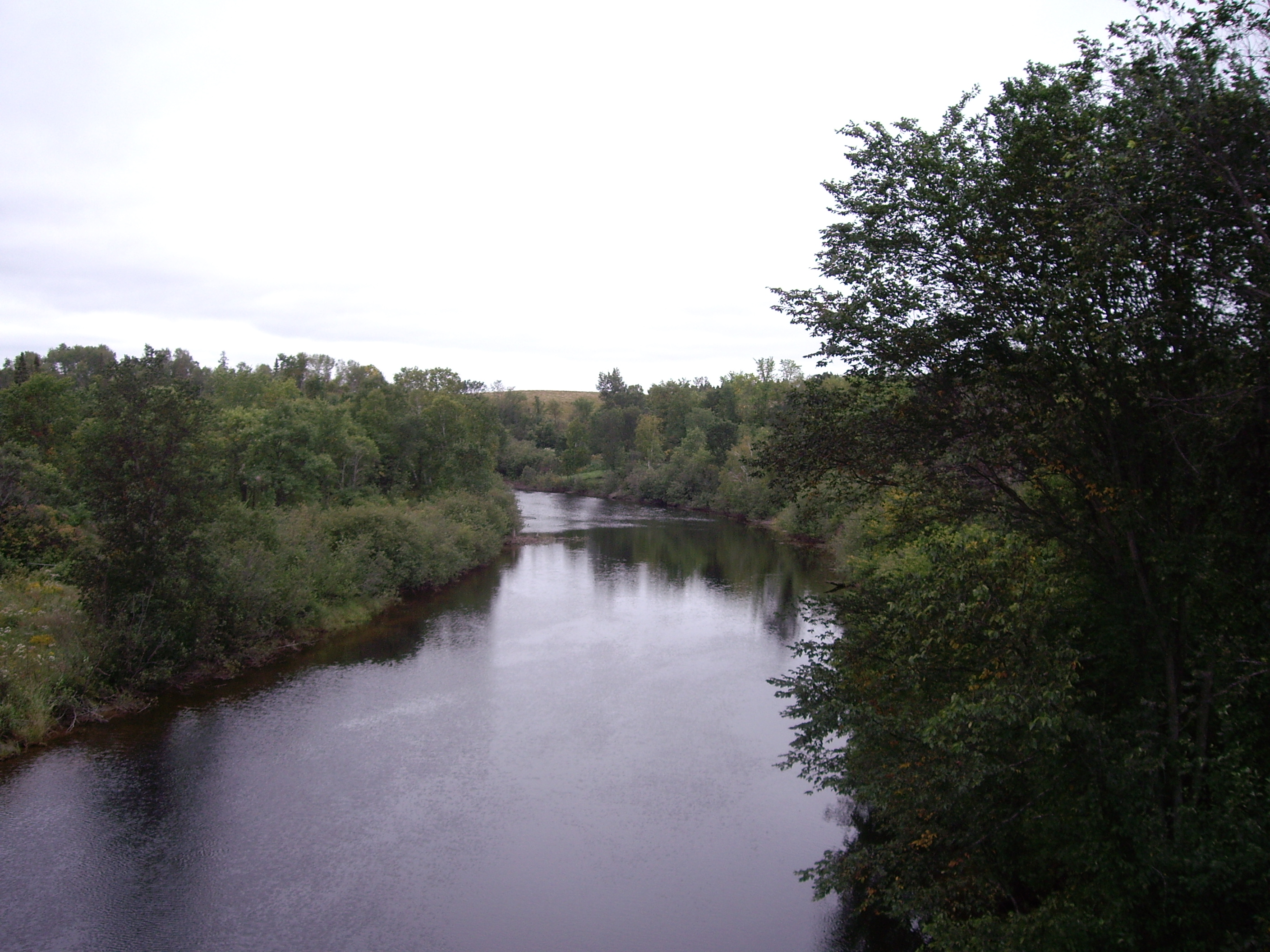
- Magnetawan River as seen looking downstream from the Highway 11 bridge at Burk's Falls

Location
- Country: Canada
- Province: Ontario
- District: Parry Sound

Physical characteristics
- Source: Magnetawan Lake
  - location: Algonquin Provincial Park, Nipissing District
  - coordinates: 45°39′45″N 78°59′12″W
- Mouth: Byng Inlet (Georgian Bay)
  - location: Britt, Parry Sound District
  - coordinates: 45°46′22″N 80°30′25″W
- Length: 175 km (109 mi)

The Magnetawan River is a long river in Parry Sound District, Ontario, Canada. The river flows 175 km from its source of Magnetawan Lake inside Algonquin Provincial Park to empty into Georgian Bay at the community of Britt on Byng Inlet.

The name of the river means "swiftly flowing waters" in the Ojibwa language.

At the end of the 19th century, the river was used to float white pine logs to sawmills downstream. The river gained recent renown when it was featured in Bill Mason's film Waterwalker.

The river has numerous rapids, such as, "The Thirty Dollar Rapids", "The Fourteen", "The Ten", the "Potato Rapids", "Poverty Bay Chutes", and "Cody Rapids".

The town of Magnetawan is located on the river between Lake Cecebe and Ahmic Lake. Locks were built here on the river to allow steamboats to travel further down the river from the railway station at Burk's Falls. The locks officially opened on July 8, 1886 and are still in use today.

There is an Ojibwe community with the name Magnetawan First Nation, the same name as the river. The community is on reserve lands on the river just east of Byng Inlet.

== Canoe routes ==
The Magnetawan River also provides great canoe routes for novice and more experienced canoe tripping. Canadian Canoe Routes lists three Magnetawan River Canoe Routes:

- Magnetawan River South Branch (35 km)
- Magnetawan River North Branch (43 km)
- Magnetawan River Loop No.2 (80 km)
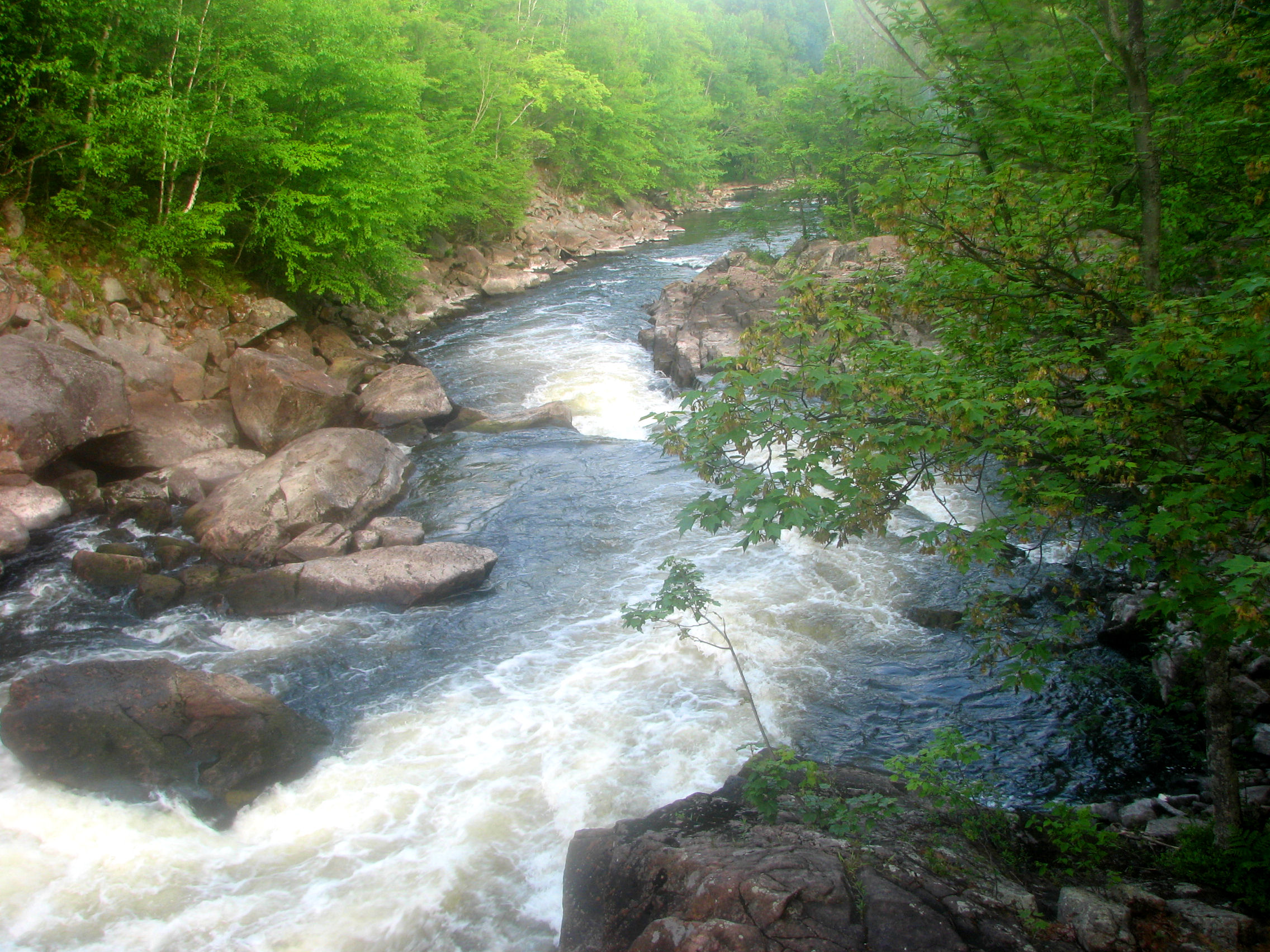
Upper Magnetawan

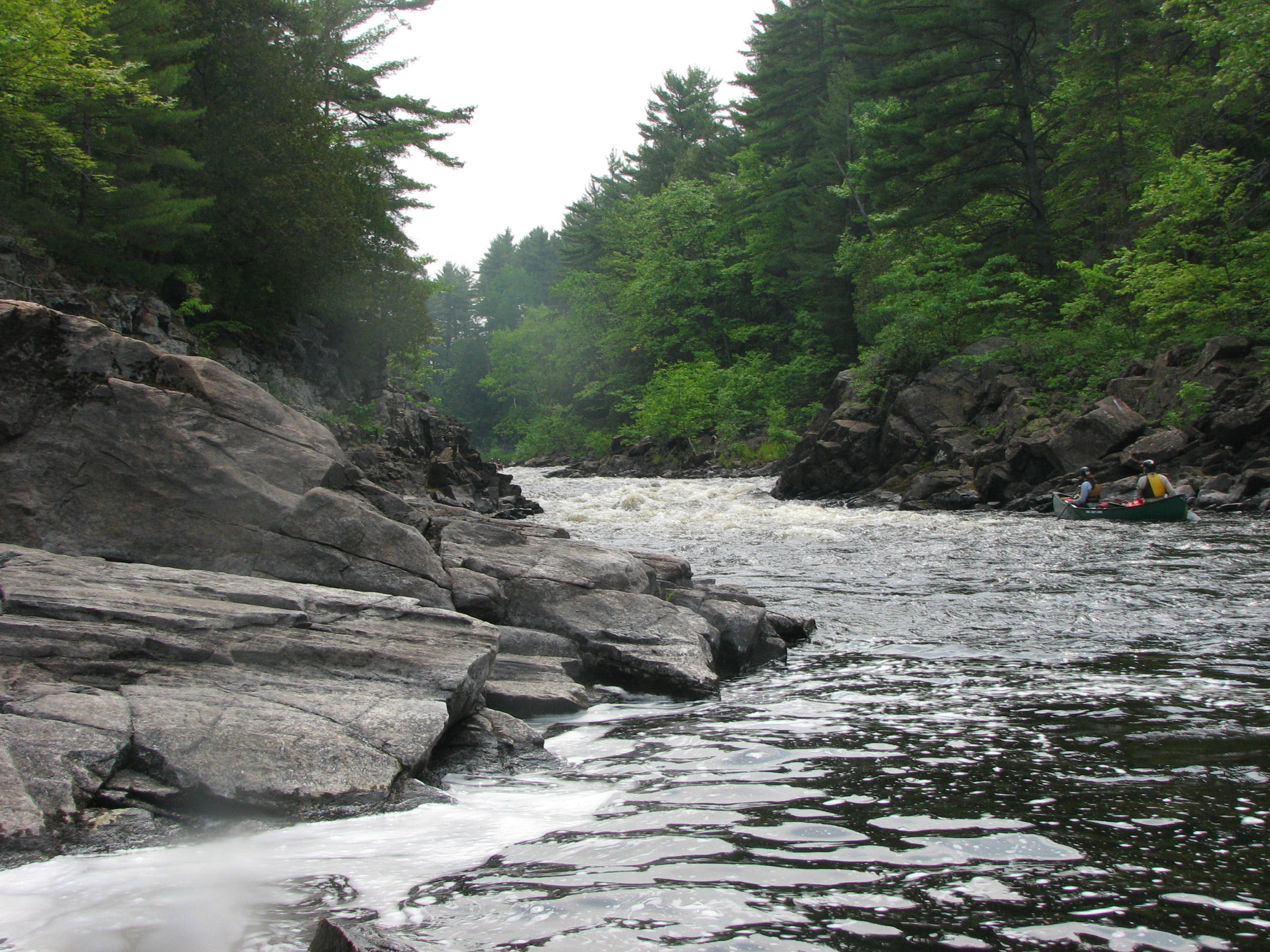
Canoers on Upper Magnetawan River

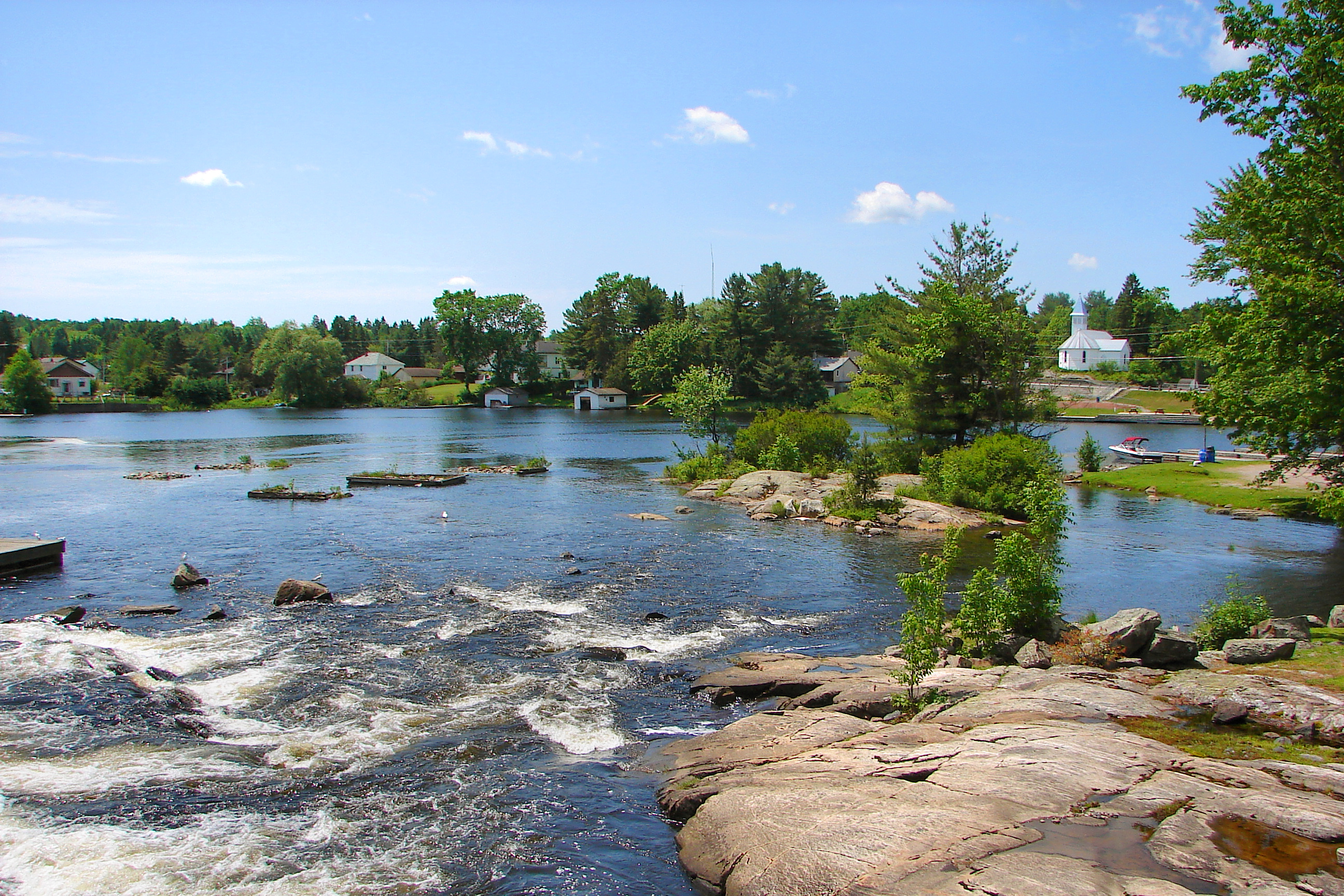
Magnetawan River flowing through Magnetawan

== See also ==
- List of rivers of Ontario
