= Guides de la République Démocratique du Congo =

National Guiding organization of Congo

Les Guides de la République Démocratique du Congo
- The Guides of the Democratic Republic of the Congo
- Country: Democratic Republic of the Congo
- Founded: 1991
- Membership: 7,784
- Affiliation: World Association of Girl Guides and Girl Scouts
- Website assogcongo.org

Les Guides de la République Démocratique du Congo (The Guides of the Democratic Republic of the Congo, GRDC; formerly Association des Guides du Congo) is the national Guiding organization of the Democratic Republic of the Congo. It was founded in 1991 and became an associate member of the World Association of Girl Guides and Girl Scouts (WAGGGS) in July 2008. The association serves 7,784 girls (as of 2008).

== History ==
Guiding came to the then Belgian Congo in 1928 when first groups where started by Roman Catholic and Protestant missionaries. However, the first official unit was not founded until 1937 in Elisabethville. In 1950, the country was visited by Olave Baden-Powell, who met Scouts and Guides in Leopoldville. After the country's independence in 1960, the World Association of Girl Guides and Girl Scouts assisted the Guiding association in its membership application. During the 21st World Conference of WAGGGS in June 1972, the Association des Guides du Zaire (Guides Association of Zaire) was accepted as an associated member. Only five months later, all youth organizations were banned by the government.

Guiding was restarted in 1991 under the name Association des Guides du Congo and rebuild with support from the Africa Region of WAGGGS. In 2008, Guiding was present in nine of the eleven provinces of the Democratic Republic of the Congo. The association was readmitted as an associate member of WAGGGS during WAGGGS' 33rd world conference in July 2008.

== Program ==
The association is divided in three sections according to age:

- Les Bengalis (Brownies) - ages 5 to 11
- Les Guides (Guides) - ages 12 to 17
- Les Ainees (Rangers) - ages 17 and older.

== See also ==
- Scouting in the Democratic Republic of the Congo
