= Association des Scouts et Guides du Congo =

Scouting organization of the Congo

- Guide and Scout Association of the Congo
- Country: Republic of the Congo
- Founded: 1992
- Membership: 3,000
- Affiliation: World Association of Girl Guides and Girl Scouts
- Website asgc.webnode.fr

The Association des Scouts et Guides du Congo (ASGC, Scout and Guide Association of the Congo) is one of the national Scouting and Guiding organizations of the Republic of the Congo (Brazzaville). The coeducational organization was founded in 1992 and has about 40 groups with 3,000 members, but there is no national organization recognized by the World Organization of the Scout Movement.

Guiding was introduced to French Equatorial Africa in 1927, and became a member of the World Association of Girl Guides and Girl Scouts in 1957, and again in 1996 after the renewal of the organization. The Guide section numbers 1,100 members as of 2008.

boy-specific badge

The emblem of the Association des Scouts et Guides du Congo incorporates the color scheme of the flag of the Republic of the Congo.
