= Burk's Falls =

- Village (single-tier)
- Village of Burk's Falls
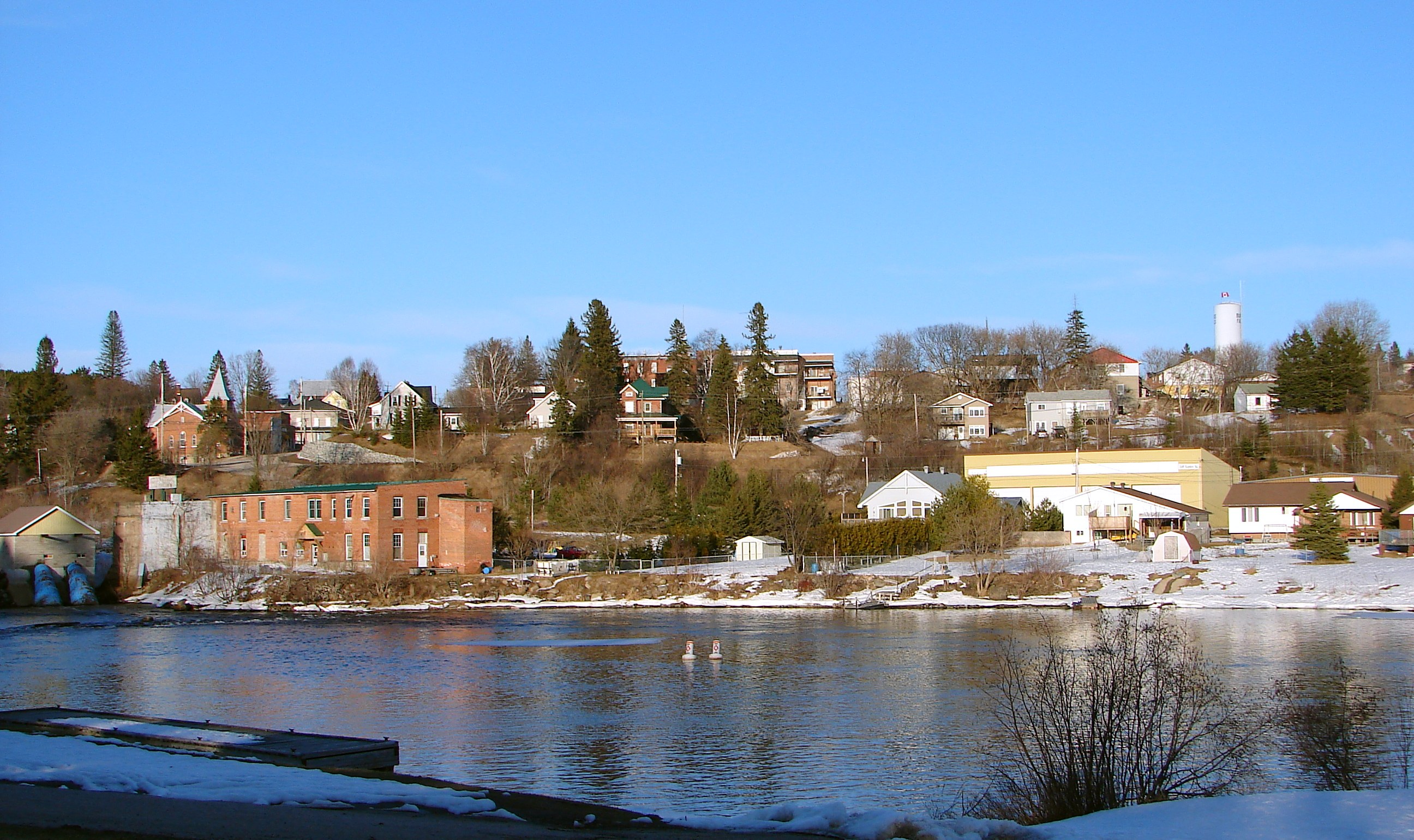

- Location within Southern Ontario
- Coordinates: 45°37′N 79°24′W
- Country: Canada
- Province: Ontario
- District: Parry Sound
- Settled: 1875
- Incorporation: 1890

Government
  - Mayor: Chris Hope
  - Fed. riding: Parry Sound-Muskoka
  - Prov. riding: Parry Sound—Muskoka

Area
  - Land: 3.09 km^{2} (1.19 sq mi)

Population (2021)
  - Total: 957
  - Density: 310/km^{2} (800/sq mi)
- Time zone: UTC-5 (Eastern (EST))
  - Summer (DST): UTC-4 (EDT)
- Postal Code: P0A 1C0
- Area code: 705
- Website: burksfalls.net

Burk's Falls is an incorporated village in the Almaguin Highlands region of Parry Sound District, Ontario, Canada, located 265 kilometres (165 mi) north of Toronto and 90 kilometres (56 mi) south of North Bay. The village, and the waterfall on the site, were named (for himself) by David Francis Burk of Oshawa, after he selected the land surrounding the waterfall in the Free Land Grant Act.

== Geography ==
Located about 60 kilometres (37 mi) west of Algonquin Provincial Park in picturesque cottage country, Burk's Falls is at the intersection of Ontario Highway 11 and the Magnetawan River. It is an enclave within Armour Township. The area is set amid the fresh-water bodies that make Northern Ontario famous; the largest of which are Horn Lake to the Northwest, Pickerel Lake to the Northeast, Three Mile Lake to the Southeast, and the joined Doe and Little Doe Lakes to the Southwest. The eponymous Burk's Falls are part of the Magnetawan River.

== History ==
The area was opened up for colonization as part of The Free Grants and Homestead Act, which was passed in 1868. This act granted 100 acres (40 ha) of land to any settler willing to clear, cultivate, and live on it. In fall 1875, David Francis Burk was one of the first settlers to arrive, staking his claim near the falls that he named after himself after winning a coin toss for the naming rights with another early settler. The following spring, he returned with his family and built a cabin on his land. Others followed and Burk opened a post office in his cabin.

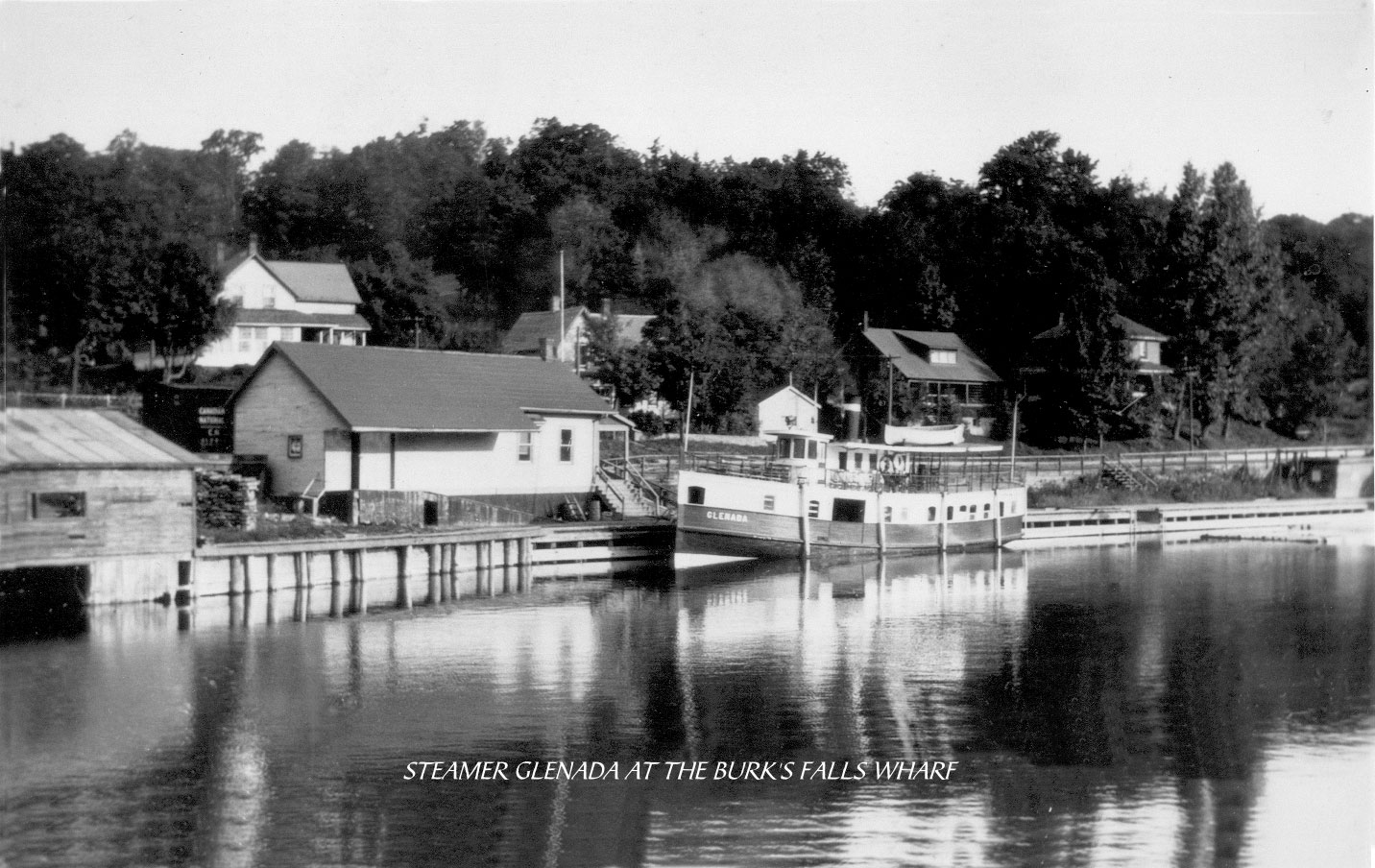
The steamship Glenada moored in Burk's Fall in 1920.

At that time, the only access to the region was via the Magnetawan River from Georgian Bay, or through the forests of the unsurveyed townships, north of Bracebridge. After 1875 the Rosseau-Nipissing Colonization Road allowed access from Muskoka, to the south. In 1879 steamboat service was established to the foot of the falls, from the village of Magnetawan.

Burk replaced his cabin with a large wooden building, known as The Burk House of Burk Hotel, that served as his home, general store, hotel, post office, and church. Other businesses sprung up along what became known as Ontario Street, the centre of the community, including its first school.

Railway service came to Burk's Falls in 1885, with the opening of Northern and Pacific Junction Railway (absorbed by the Grand Trunk Railway in 1888). The Village of Burk's Falls was incorporated in 1890, when it separated from the Township of Armour. Its first reeve was James Sharpe. At that time, the village consisted of 3 hotels, 2 printers, 5 churches, a school, several general stores, a hardware store, a butcher store, a bakery, several sawmills, and a tannery. There were also carpenters, lawyers, shoemakers, doctors, a harness maker, a tailor, and a surveyor.

In 1908, a large fire swept through Burk's Falls, destroying all buildings and businesses along Ontario Street. A by-law was passed requiring the reconstructed buildings to be made of stone or brick along this street.

A rare swing bridge was completed over the Magnetawan, just west of Burk's Falls.

=== Growth of the village ===
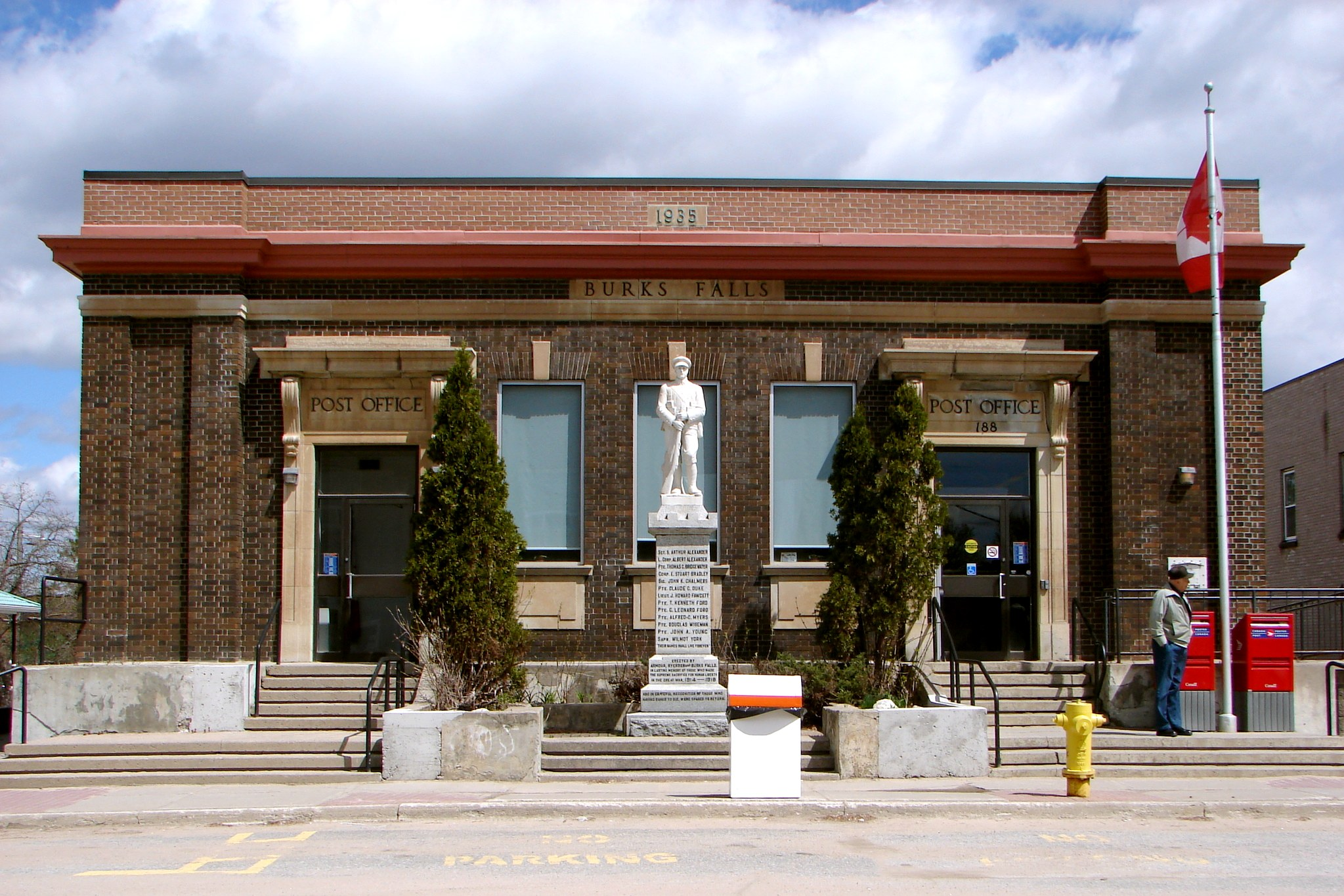
Post Office, built in 1935

This growth has been limited and Burk's Falls has not amalgamated with any nearby towns such as Katrine. The population has remained steady over the last decades, standing around 1000.

Also located in Burk's Falls is the Outward Bound Canadian Base Camp.

== Demographics ==
In the 2021 Census of Population conducted by Statistics Canada, Burk's Falls had a population of 957 living in 465 of its 523 total private dwellings, a change of −2.4% from its 2016 population of 981. With a land area of 3.09 km^{2} (1.19 sq mi), it had a population density of 309.7/km^{2} (802.1/sq mi) in 2021.

Canada census – Burk's Falls community profile

	2021	2016	2011
Population	957 (-2.4% from 2016)	981 (+1.4% from 2011)	967 (+8.3% from 2006)
Land area	3.09 km^{2} (1.19 sq mi)	3.07 km^{2} (1.19 sq mi)	3.12 km^{2} (1.20 sq mi)
Population density	310.0/km^{2} (803/sq mi)	319.2/km^{2} (827/sq mi)	309.9/km^{2} (803/sq mi)
Median age	45.2 (M: 43.2, F: 48.8)	44.8 (M: 43.8, F: 45.7)
Private dwellings	523 (total) 465 (occupied)	510 (total)	476 (total)
Median household income	$54,400	$40,288

References: 2021 2016 2011

Historical census populations – Burk's Falls

Year	Pop.	±%
1901	849	—
1911	976	+15.0%
1921	981	+0.5%
1931	855	−12.8%
1941	710	−17.0%
1951	891	+25.5%
1956	902	+1.2%

Year	Pop.	±%
1961	926	+2.7%
1966	864	−6.7%
1971	891	+3.1%
1976	871	−2.2%
1981	922	+5.9%
1986	927	+0.5%
1991	977	+5.4%

Year	Pop.	±%
1996	986	+0.9%
2001	940	−4.7%
2006	893	−5.0%
2011	967	+8.3%
2016	981	+1.4%
2021	957	−2.4%

Source: Statistics Canada

== Transportation ==
The village is served by provincial highways 11 and 520. Highway 11 was rerouted around the village in 2012 when it expanded as a dual carriageway with an interchange.

Intercity motor coach service to Burk's Falls is provided by Ontario Northland along its Toronto–Barrie–Parry Sound–Sudbury route's local schedule; it is bypassed by express schedules, but still receives twice-daily service northbound and southbound.
