= Ahmic Lake =

Lake in Ontario, Canada

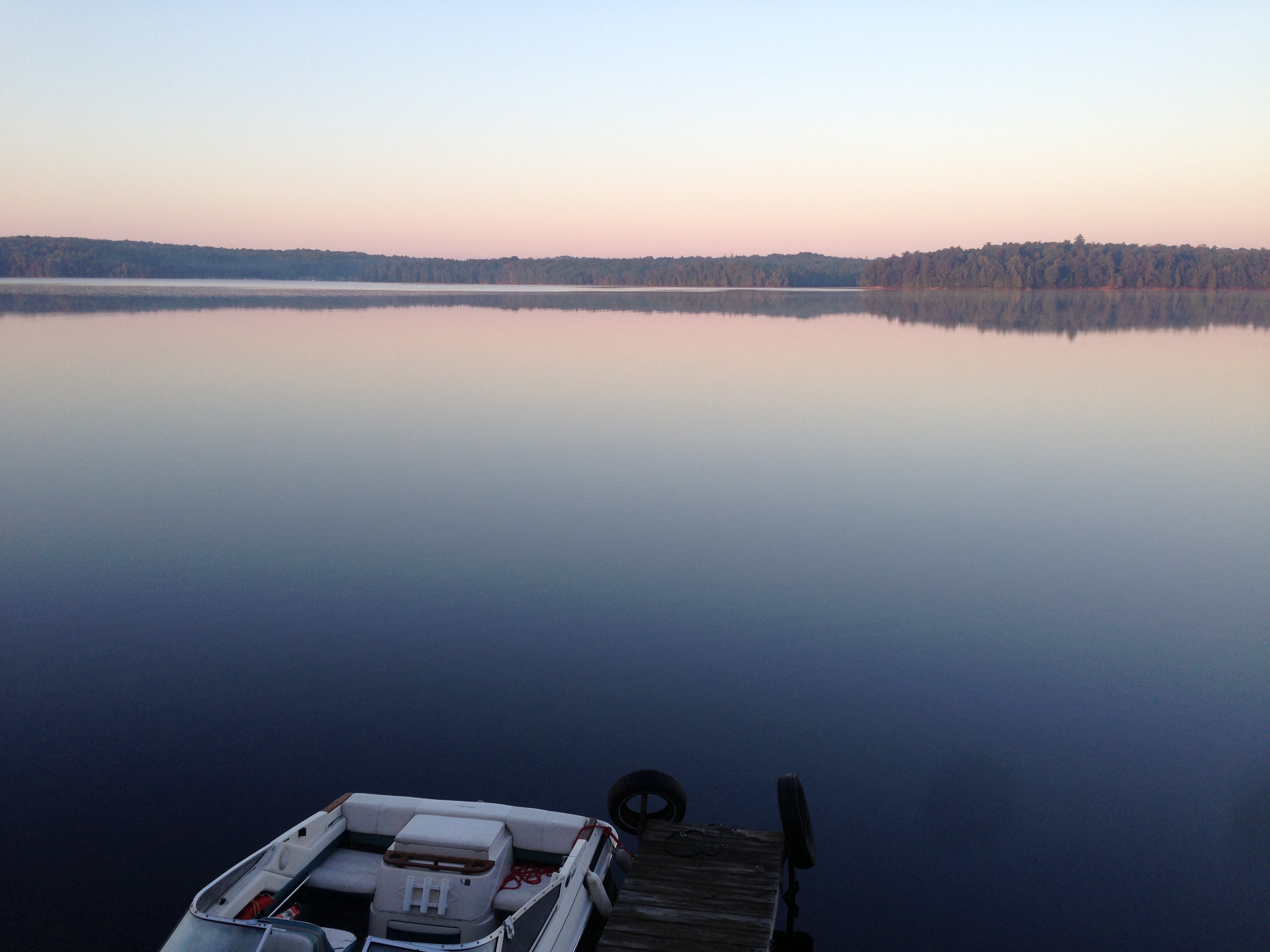

- Location within Ontario
- Location: Parry Sound District, Ontario
- Coordinates: 45°37′45″N 79°41′00″W
- Primary inflows: Magnetawan River
- Primary outflows: Magnetawan River
- Basin countries: Canada
- Max. length: 19 km (12 mi)
- Surface area: 8.7 km^{2} (3.4 sq mi)
- Average depth: 8.2 m (27 ft)
- Max. depth: 27 m (89 ft)
- Shore length^{1}: 72 km (45 mi)
- Surface elevation: 279 m (915 ft)
- Islands: 19
- ^{1} Shore length is not a well-defined measure.

Ahmic Lake is a lake in Parry Sound District, Ontario, Canada, part of the Magnetawan River waterway in the Almaguin Highlands region. Ahmic Lake is approximately 19 km long and connects to two smaller lakes, Neighick (nicknamed Beaver Lake) and Crawford Lake.

Wealthy American tourists have been visiting the area since the 1860s and bought large tracts of land around the lake. With most cottages staying in family hands, the lake's shores have been kept intact over the years, making Ahmic a lake with only moderate shoreline disturbance or alteration. Around the beginning of the 20th century, a number of fishing camps were built on Ahmic Lake, including Cedar Croft which stayed in business until the late 1950s.

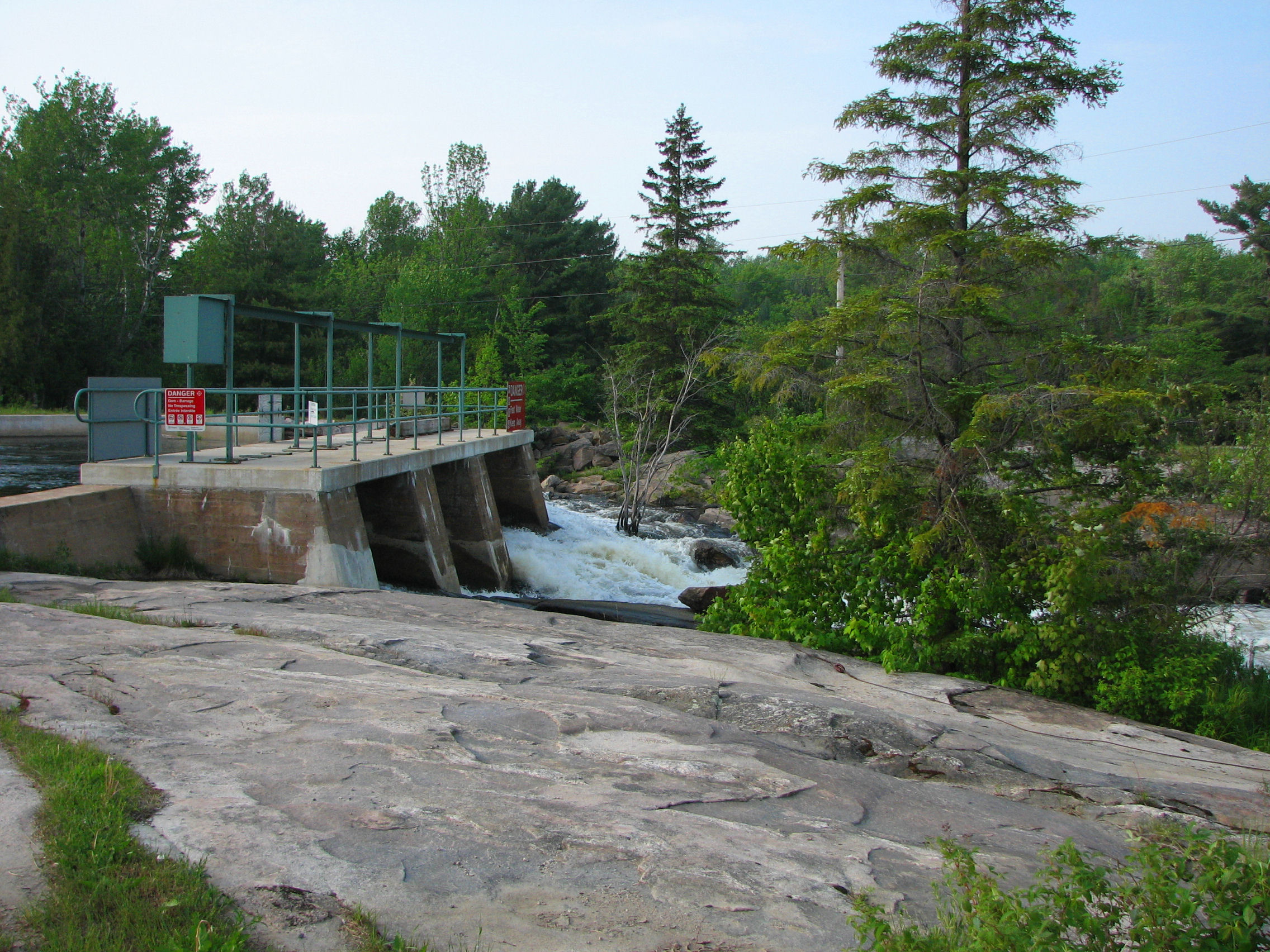
Dam near Ahmic Lake Resort

The lake is known for the presence of two swimming camps, Camp Chikopi, the boys camp, and Camp Ak-O-Mak, the girls camp. It is also known for Camp Kahquah, a Be In Christ Church of Canada camp. Camp Chikopi was the world's first competitive swim camp. Camp Chikopi and Camp Ak-O-Mak are directly across the lake from each other and to get from one to the other by water one paddles past Rocky Reef, which is a historic tourist peninsula. The tourist industry and the two swim camps are what kept the young people and adult residents in the small town of Ahmic Harbour employed for many decades and still contributes to the economic well-being of the area. Ahmic Harbour is located at the tip of the small bay of Ahmic Lake along Highway 124.

Ahmic Lake was an ideal lake for the two swim camps due to the clear water and a size that allowed for training of marathon swimmers such as Marty Sinn.

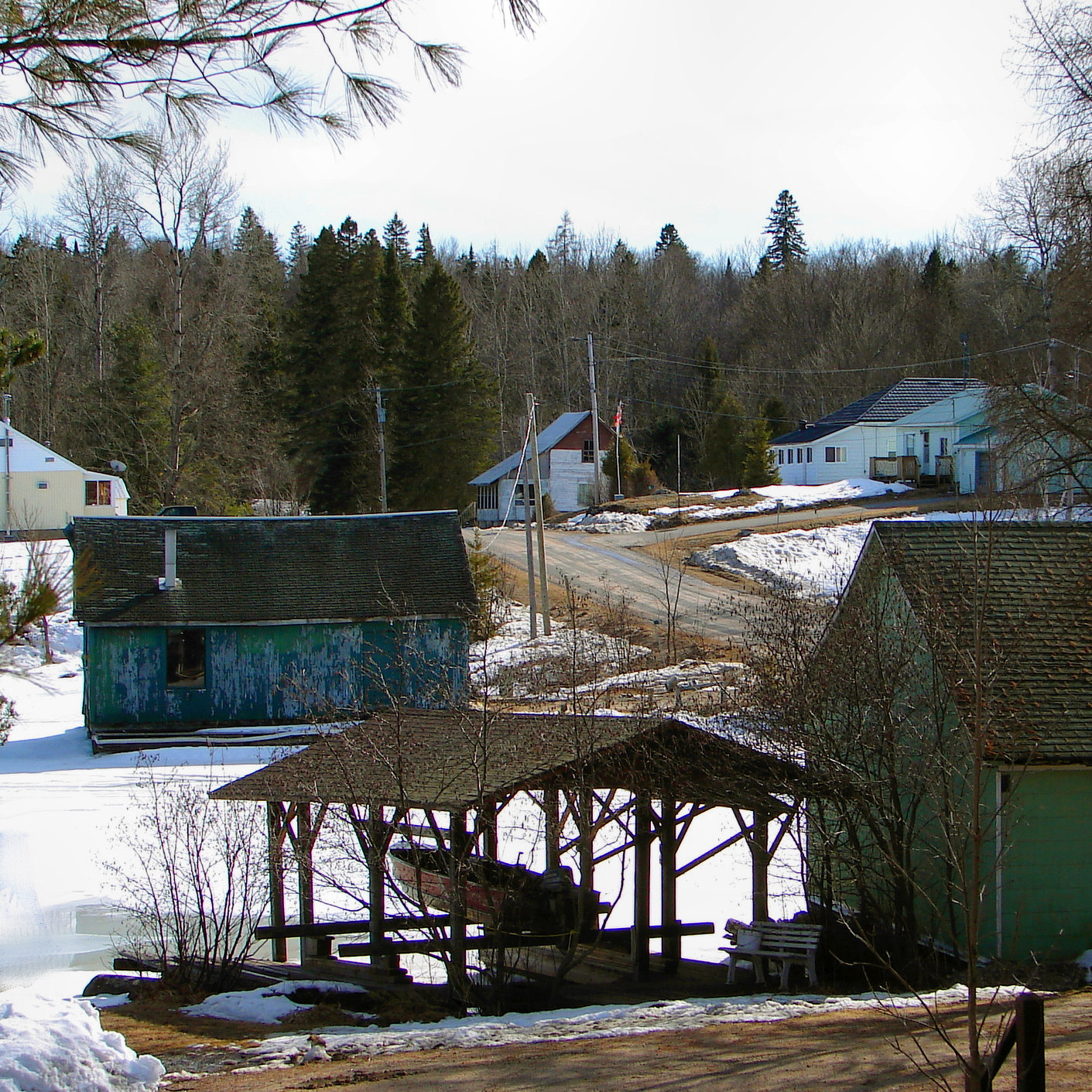
The community of Ahmic Harbour at the north-western end of Ahmic Lake

== Fish species ==
Fish species in the lake include:

- Walleye
- Northern pike
- Largemouth bass
- Smallmouth bass
- Lake whitefish
- Rainbow smelt
- Yellow perch
- Pumpkinseed
- Bluegill
- Brown bullhead
- Crappie
- Rock bass
- Pickerel

== See also ==
- List of lakes in Ontario
