= Commander-in-Chief, North Sea =

British senior appointment

- Department of Admiralty
- Reports to: Admiral of the Fleet
- Nominator: First Lord of the Admiralty
- Appointer: First Lord of the Admiralty; Subject to formal approval by the King-in-Council
- Term length: Not fixed, (usually 1-3 years)
- Inaugural holder: Rear-Admiral of the Blue John Byng
- Formation: 1745-1815

The Commander-in-Chief, North Sea, was senior appointment and an operational command of the British Royal Navy originally based at Great Yarmouth from 1745 to 1802 then at Ramsgate from 1803 until 1815.

The office holder commanded the North Sea Fleet.

== History ==
The North Sea has traditionally been an important command from the 13th to 15th centuries there was an Admiral of the North based at Yarmouth that office ceased when it was unified with the new office of Admiral of England. During the 16th and 17th centuries, Vice Admirals in the North Sea were appointed to the command of the North Sea Squadron though on an intermittent basis. From 1652 to 1654, Yarmouth used by the Royal Navy for stationing its fleets during the First Anglo-Dutch War. A more permanent appointment was then established in 1745 the Commander-in-Chief, North Sea he had overall responsibility for the North Sea Fleet usually anchored at Yarmouth Roads. The fleet is most well known for its key role in the Battle of Camperdown against the Batavian Navy on 11 October 1797, which resulted in a decisive British victory. The fleet was also involved in trade protection, with the advent of the looming Napoleonic Wars, and later, it turned to the blockading of enemy ports. The fleet also played an instrumental part in the British anti-invasion preparations of 1803–05 in response to Napoleon's planned invasion of the United Kingdom.

In May 1804, under the Commander-in-Chief, North Sea Admiral of the White George Elphinstone, the North Sea Fleet would reach its largest composition. It consisted of around 170 to 179 ships and divided primarily between squadrons each commanded by competent admirals.

The office was abolished in 1815, and its former duties were taken over by the Commander-in-Chief, The Nore whose role and geographic area of command was re-defined by the Admiralty.

== Commander-in-Chief, North Sea ==
Included:

- Rear-Admiral John Byng, 1745–1746.
- Rear-Admiral Thomas Smith, 1746–1747.
- Commodore John Towry, 1747.
- Vice-Admiral Hyde Parker, 1781-1782
- Commodore Keith Stewart, 1782
- Rear-Admiral John Lockhart-Ross, 1782.
- Vice-Admiral Mark Milbanke, 1782–1783.

No fleet present 1784-1789

- Vice-Admiral Samuel Hood, 1790.

No fleet present 1791-1793

- Rear-Admiral Henry Harvey, 1794–1795.
- Vice-Admiral Adam Duncan, 1st Viscount Duncan, 1795-1800
- Admiral Archibald Dickson, 1800-1802
- Admiral George Elphinstone, 1st Baron Keith, 1803-07
- Rear-Admiral Thomas Macnamara Russell, 1807-1810
- Rear-Admiral Sir Richard Strachan, 6th Baronet, 1809–1810.
- Vice-Admiral Sir Edward Pellew, 1st Baronet, 1810–1811.
- Admiral Sir William Young, 1811–1815.

== Sources ==
- A New Biographical Dictionary, of 3000 Contemporary Public Characters, British and Foreign, of All Ranks and Professions. G. B. Whittaker. 1835.
- Archives, The National. "Admiralty: Nore Station: Correspondence". discovery.nationalarchives.gov.uk. The National Archives, 1805–1939, ADM 151.
- Blake, Richard (2008). Evangelicals in the Royal Navy, 1775-1815: Blue Lights & Psalm-singers. Boydell Press. ISBN 9781843833598.
- Chambers, Robert; Thomson, Thomas (1855). A Biographical Dictionary of Eminent Scotsmen: Crichton-Hamilton, John. Blackie.
- Clarke, James Stanier; McArthur, John (2010). The Naval Chronicle: Volume 3, January–July 1800: Containing a General and Biographical History of the Royal Navy of the United Kingdom with a Variety of Original Papers on Nautical Subjects. Cambridge University Press. ISBN 9781108018425
- Davies, J. D. (2008). Pepys Navy: Ships, Men and Warfare 1649–89. Seaforth Publishing. ISBN 9781783830220.
- Ireland, Bernard (2001), Naval Warfare in the Age of Sail - War at Sea 1756–1815, 1st Ed, WW Norton & Co. ISBN 9780393049831.
- Knighton, edited by C.S.; Loades, David (2011). The Navy of Edward VI and Mary I. Farnham, Surrey: Ashgate for the Navy Records Society. ISBN 9781409418474.
- Loades, D. M. (1996). John Dudley, Duke of Northumberland, 1504–1553. Wotton-under-Edge, England: Clarendon Press. ISBN 9780198201939.
- Mace, Martin; Grehan, John (Nov 14, 2013). British Battles of the Napoleonic Wars 1793-1806: Despatched from the Front. Pen and Sword. ISBN 9781473831421.
- Marshall, John (2010). Royal Naval Biography: Or, Memoirs of the Services of All the Flag-Officers, Superannuated Rear-Admirals, Retired-Captains, Post-Captains, and Commanders. Cambridge University Press. ISBN 9781108022644.
- O'Byrne, William R. (1849). "Stewart, Keith" . A Naval Biographical Dictionary. London: John Murray. p. 1117.
- Palmer, Charles John (1856). The History of Great Yarmouth, Designed as a Continuation of Manship's History of that Town. Louis Alfred Meall, The Quay.
- Pettigrew, Thomas Joseph (1849). Memoirs of the Life of Vice-Admiral Lord Viscount Nelson. T. and W. Boone.
- Rodger, N.A.M. (2004), The Command of the Ocean: A Naval History of Britain, 1649–1815. New York and London: W.W. Norton and Company. ISBN 9780393060508.
- (Viscount), Horatio Nelson Nelson; Maffeo, Steven E. (2007). Seize, Burn, Or Sink: The Thoughts and Words of Admiral Lord Horatio Nelson. Scarecrow Press. ISBN 9780810857810.
