= Wallbridge Township =

Unorganised geographic township

Coordinates: 45°45′06″N 80°24′43″W

Wallbridge is an unorganized geographic township in Parry Sound District, Ontario, Canada. Part of the census subdivision of Unorganized Centre Parry Sound District, the township includes the communities of Britt, Byng Inlet and Harris Lake and the rail sidings of Drocourt and North Magnetawan. Although not an incorporated municipality, Britt and Byng Inlet are jointly served by a local services board.

== Geography ==
The township is adjacent to Georgian Bay on Lake Huron. The Magnetawan River flows from east to west across the breadth of the township to its mouth on Lake Huron. Other rivers flowing to Lake Huron include the Naiscoot River flowing east to west at the south of the township, and the Giroux River in the middle of the township.

The Magnetawan First Nation with the Magnetawan No. 1 reserve occupies a large portion of the centre of the township, and the majority of the Naiscoutaing 17A reserve of the Shawanaga First Nation is at the southeast.

== Transport ==
The township is served by provincial highways 69, 526, 529 and 645.

There are Ontario Northland motor coach flag stops on Highway 69 for Britt and Byng Inlet, at the turn offs for highways 526 and 529 respectively. They are both served by local buses on the Toronto–Barrie–Parry Sound–Sudbury corridor.

== See also ==
- List of townships in Ontario
