= Baker Phillips =

Royal Navy officer

Lieutenant Baker Phillips (c.1718 – 19 July 1745) was a Royal Navy officer who served in the War of the Austrian Succession. During the conflict, he served as second lieutenant abroad HMS Anglesea. In 1745, an unprepared Anglesea was attacked and captured by a French warship. Phillips was court-martialed and executed for surrendering his ship while in command, his superiors having fallen to French fire. His court-martial was widely criticised and led to an amendment of the British Articles of War.

== Naval service ==
On 28 March 1745, Anglesea sailed out of Kinsale, having landed her first Lieutenant, among others, due to illness and proceeded to the mouth of the English Channel. The warship was under the command of Captain Jacob Elton, and was tasked with patrolling the Channel for French shipping. On the afternoon of 29 March, a large sail was spotted windward (upwind) of Anglesea, with the vessel heading in the direction of the British warship. Believing the oncoming ship to be HMS Augusta, Captain Elton retired below deck to take his dinner. The ship quickly approached Anglesea, with it eventually being discovered that the ship flew French colours on her quarter. This was the 50-gun Apollon, which closed and prepared for action with the seemingly idle British warship. In the confusion aboard the British ship, Captain Elton ordered Anglesea's foresail raised in preparation for a retreat. The effect of this action was to blow the ship to one side and flood the lower gun decks. Apollon laid down a withering fire onto Anglesea, with the first broadside killing both Captain Elton and the master of the ship, leaving the second lieutenant Baker Phillips in command. Several more minutes saw 60 men killed or wounded by French fire. Apollon was able to engage the crippled Anglesea from its leeward side, granting the French ship an advantage in manoeuvrability. With Anglesea unable to fight and with the ship taking on water, Phillips ordered the colours struck and surrendered the vessel.

== Court-martial ==
Under the British Articles of War, Phillips was charged with the dishonourable surrendering of a vessel under his command to the enemy. Under Article 10, the military court sentenced Phillips to death for failing to put the ship in order for battle, for failing to encourage the officers and men of the vessel to fight courageously, for failing to do his utmost to command the vessel after the death of his superior officer, and for yielding his ship to an enemy. The court recommend that Philips should be treated mercifully on account of his youth and inexperience, writing:

... was unanimously of opinion that Captain Elton, deceased, did not give timely directions for getting his ship clear or in a proper posture of defence, nor did he afterwards behave like an officer or a seaman, which was the cause of the ship being left to Lieutenant Phillips in such distress and confusion. And that Lieutenant Baker Phillips, late second lieutenant of the said ship, by not endeavouring to the utmost of his power after Captain Elton's death to put the ship in order of fighting, not encouraging the inferior officers and common men to fight courageously, and by yielding to the enemy, falls under part of the tenth article. They do sentence him to death, to be shot by a platoon of musqueteers on the forecastle, ... but ... having regard to the distress and confusion the ship was in when he came to the command, and being a young man and unexperienced, they beg leave to recommend him for mercy.

An appeal against the sentence of death was refused, and Phillips was executed by firing squad on the forecastle of HMS Princess Royal at 11 am on 19 July 1745.

The execution of Lieutenant Phillips was controversial. Many in Parliament believed that a captain or other high-ranking officer caught in his position would not have been executed. The incident led to the Articles of War being amended to ensure one law for all, with that law recommending the death penalty for any officer of any rank who did not do his utmost against the enemy in battle or pursuit. The consensus within the Royal Navy was not that Phillips should have been spared execution, but rather that any commander, including high-ranking officers, should be executed if they surrendered or showed incompetence. Parliament on the other hand believed that Phillips was used as a scapegoat to cover the failures of a higher-ranking Royal Navy officer.

The new laws enacted in the aftermath of Phillips' execution were cited as being the cause of the execution of British admiral John Byng in 1757.
