= North Sea Fleet (United Kingdom) =

- Ensign of the White Squadron
- Active: 1745–1815
- Country: United Kingdom
- Branch: Royal Navy
- Type: Fleet
- Role: Trade Protection, Blockade
- Part of: Royal Navy
- Garrison/HQ: Yarmouth Roads, Great Yarmouth, (1745-1802); Ramsgate (1803-1815)
- Engagements: Battle of Dogger Bank (1781); First Anglo-Dutch War; Battle of Camperdown; British anti-invasion preparations of 1803–05

Commanders
- Notable commanders: Admiral of the White: George Elphinstone, Viscount Keith.

The North Sea Fleet was a naval formation and major operational command of the British Royal Navy based at Great Yarmouth from 1745 to 1802 then at Ramsgate from 1803 until 1815.

The fleet was commanded by the Commander-in-Chief, North Sea.

== History ==
From the thirteenth until the fifteenth century the North Sea had been an important command, with an Admiral of the North based at Yarmouth appointed to commanded a Northern Fleet. During the Tudor Period vice admirals were appointed to command a North Sea Squadron operating from Newcastle, though that squadron was usually formed only on a temporary basis. During the First Anglo-Dutch War (1652–1654) the Royal Navy stationed its North Sea Fleet at Yarmouth. A more permanent formation was established from 1745. In May 1804 Napoleon's planned invasion of the United Kingdom at the start of the War of the Third Coalition, although never attempted, was a major influence on British naval strategy and the fortification of the coast of southeast England.

In 1804 the North Sea Fleet, then under the command of Admiral of the White George Elphinstone, Viscount Keith, reached its largest size, consisting of some 170-179 ships (according to sources given). The fleet was divided primarily between squadrons commanded by competent admirals, including one off Boulogne, France under Rear-Admiral of the Blue Thomas Louis, one in the Downs under Vice-Admiral of the White John Holloway, one off Flushing, Batavian Republic under Rear-Admiral of the White Sidney Smith, under Edward Thornborough, one under Rear-Admiral of the Red at Texel, Batavian Republic, another in Scotland at Leith under Rear-Admiral of the White James Vashon and one stationed at Yarmouth Roads under Rear-Admiral of the Red Thomas Macnamara Russell, together with a cruising and convoy force, all reporting to Lord Keith.

== Composition of the fleet in May 1804 ==
North Sea Fleet
Formation/Units	Ships of the Line	Fourth Rate	Frigates	Sloops	Brigs	Other Ships	Total
Boulogne Squadron	1	5	3	3		11	23
Downs Squadron	5	1	4	4	6	9	29
Flushing Squadron		1	2	3		2	8
Leith Squadron	1	1	1		4	10	17
Texel Squadron	8	2	1		1	3	15
Yarmouth Squadron	5	2	3		3		13
Cruising & Convoy Forces		4	8		1	7	20
Off Heligoland		1	1			1	3
Off Hellevoetsluis		2				2	4
Off Le Havre		2	3			3	8
Hollesley Bay	1				6		7
In Port	1		2			16	19
Fitting Out	1	1	1		1		4
Other							9
Totals	21	17	31	12	24	65	170/179
