= Northern Belle (disambiguation) =

Northern Belle may refer to:

- FV Northern Belle, a fishing vessel that sank in the Gulf of Alaska on 20 April 2010
- Northern Belle (train), a luxury train in the UK
- Northern Belle (1875 ship), a steamship that served Great Lakes ports, until she was destroyed in a sudden fire
- Northern Belle, heroic efforts saved the crew of this widely publicized wreck
