= Byng Inlet (Ontario) =

Coordinates: 45°46′02″N 80°37′06″W

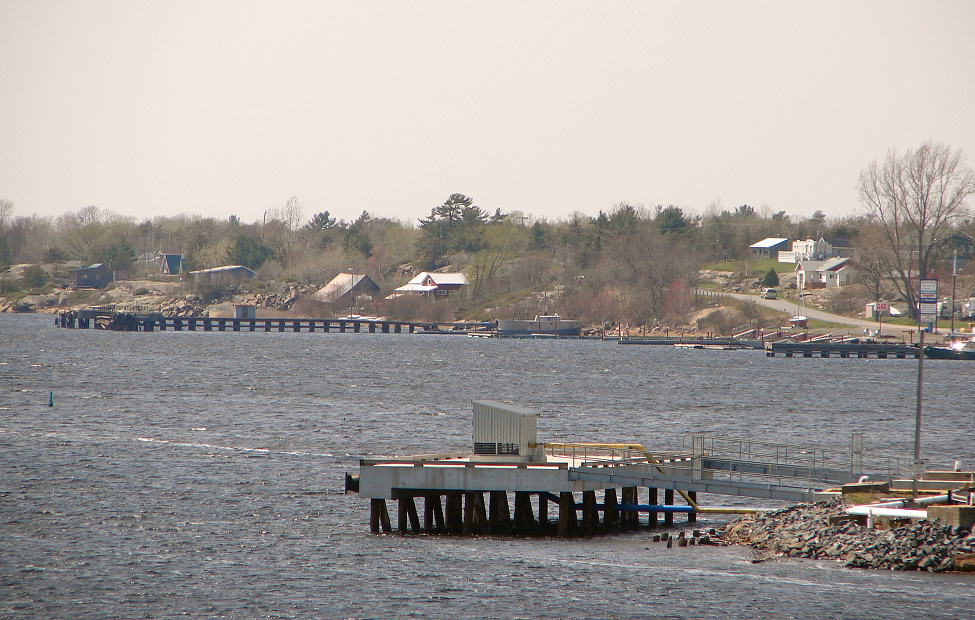
Britt as seen across Byng Inlet

Byng Inlet is a body of water on the eastern shore of Georgian Bay, between Parry Sound and the mouth of the French River. It is a widening of the Magnetawan River, near its mouth. The name of the river "Magnetawan", meaning "long open channel" in the Ojibwe language, refers to this section of the river.

== History ==
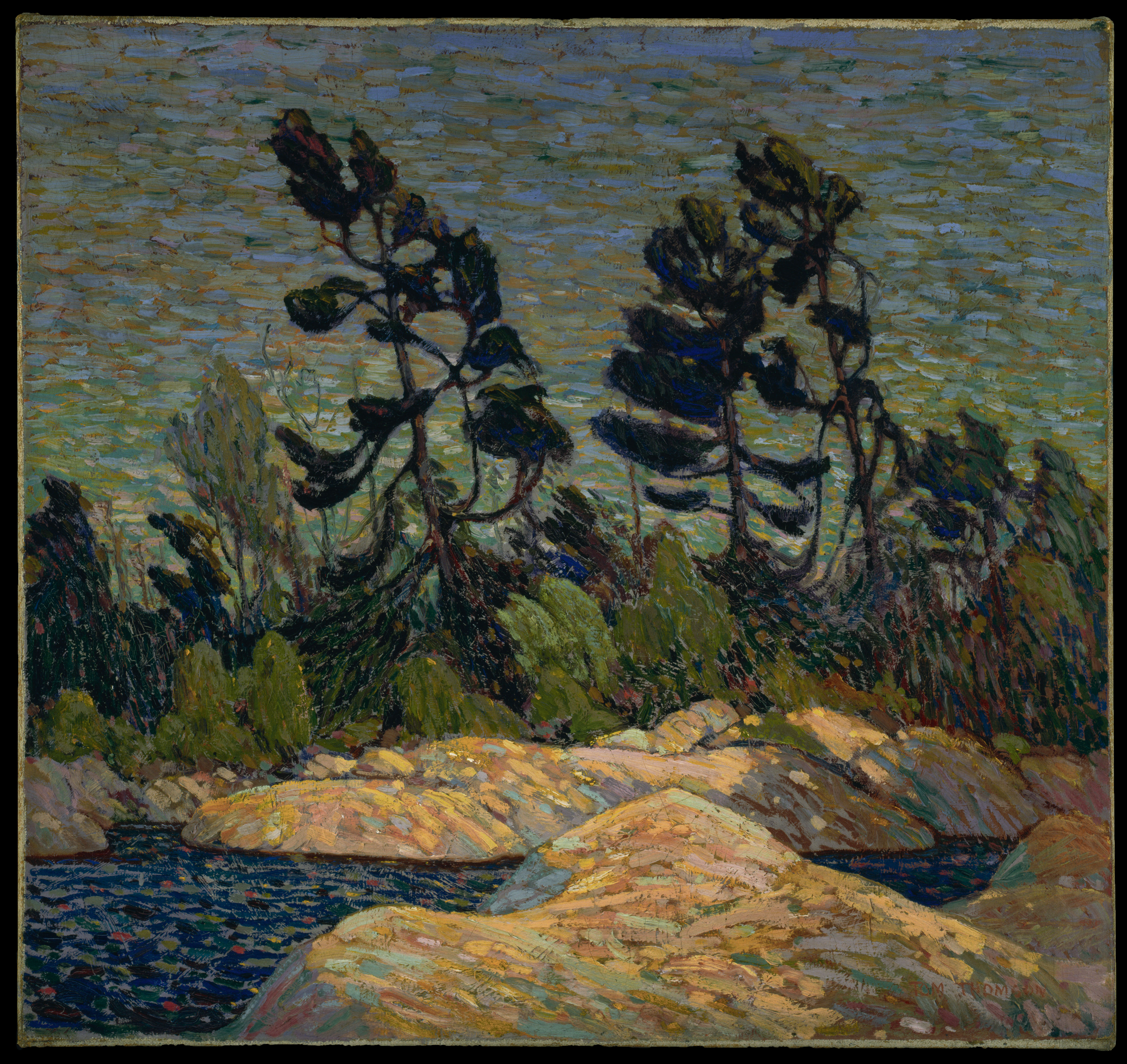
Tom Thomson, Byng Inlet, Georgian Bay, Winter 1914–1915. McMichael Canadian Art Collection, Kleinburg

=== Naming of the Inlet ===
Byng Inlet was named in the honor former British Naval officer John Byng. It was named by Captain Henry Wolsey Bayfield, who charted the Canadian shores of lakes Huron and Superior, formerly involved with Admiral William Fitzwilliam Owen, while surveying the lower Great Lakes Erie and Ontario. For surveying of this region, Bayfield made his headquarters at the Naval Establishment at Penetanguishene in 1819. In 1825, Bayfield returned to England to prepare his charts for the engraver.

=== Wreck of the Northern Belle ===
The steamship Northern Belle was suddenly engulfed in a devastating fire in Byng Inlet, on November 10, 1898. The wreck is a popular site for recreational divers.

== See also ==
- Byng Inlet, Ontario, the village on the south shore
- Britt, Ontario, on the north shore.
