= Nehemiah Bourne =

English Royal Navy admiral

Rear-Admiral Nehemiah Bourne
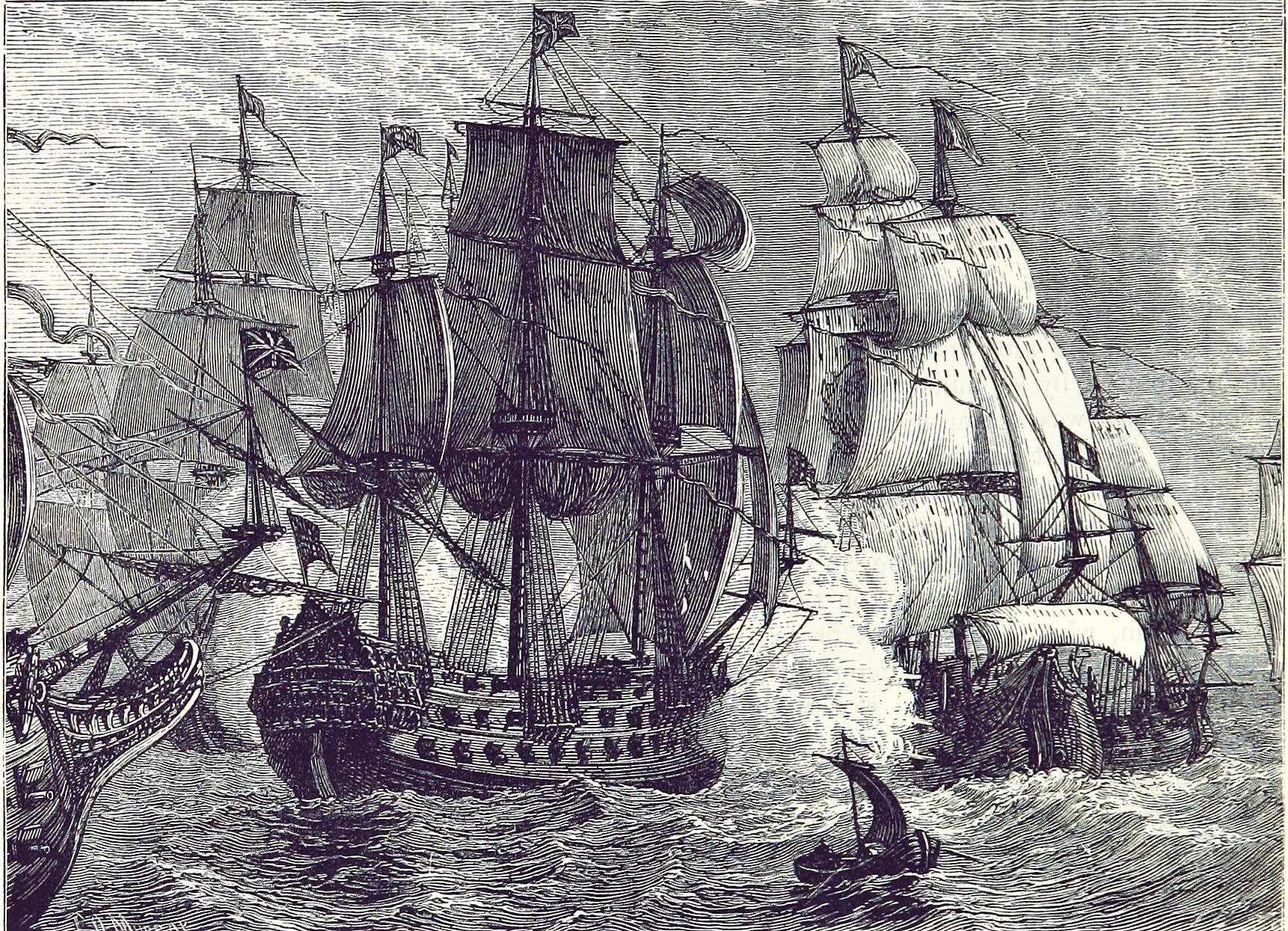
- Battle of Dover (1652), where Bourne commanded a squadron

Commissioner, Navy Office
- In office December 1652 – July 1660

Commander North Sea Squadron
- In office 1650–1652

Personal details
- Born: baptised 26 January 1611 Wapping, Middlesex, England
- Died: 1691 (aged 80) London
- Resting place: Bunhill Fields
- Spouse: Hannah Earning (1631–1684) her death
- Children: Five
- Parent(s): Robert and Mary Bourne
- Occupation: Naval officer, administrator and ship-owner

Military service
- Allegiance: Parliamentarian
- Years of service: 1643–1645; 1652–1660
- Battles/wars: First English Civil War; Siege of Crowland Abbey; Anglo-Scottish war (1650–1652); First Anglo-Dutch War; Battle of Dover (1652); Battle of the Kentish Knock

Nehemiah Bourne (baptised 26 January 1611, died 1691) was a naval officer and Puritan from London, who served Parliament during the Wars of the Three Kingdoms, and thereafter the Commonwealth.

Bourne emigrated to Massachusetts in 1638, then returned home in 1644 to take part in the First English Civil War. He later served with the Commonwealth navy during the Anglo-Scottish war (1650–1652) and First Anglo-Dutch War before being appointed to the Navy Office in December 1652. He retained this position until the 1660 Stuart Restoration, and died sometime between February and May 1691.

== Personal details ==
Nehemiah Bourne was born in Wapping, close to the Port of London, eldest son of Mary Bourne (died 1630) and her husband Robert (died 1625), a wealthy shipwright. Baptised on 26 January 1611, he was one of five surviving children, the others being Mary (born 1607), Martha (born 1609), Ruth (born 1616) and John (1620–1667), who later served under his brother in the Commonwealth navy.

He married Hannah Earning (1616–1684) in 1631, and they had five children. Two were still living when he made his will in February 1691, a son Nehemiah (1640–1709), and daughter Anna. His brother-in-law, Anthony Earning, was also a captain in the Commonwealth navy from 1651 to 1660.

== Career ==
Like his father, Bourne was part of a close-knit group of Puritan merchants and shipowners, among them future Parliamentarian soldier, sailor and political radical, Thomas Rainsborough. The period of Personal Rule exercised by Charles I from 1629 to 1640 led many Puritans to emigrate to New England, including Bourne. In 1638, he journeyed in a ship owned by the Rainsborough family to Massachusetts, where he established a ship-building company.

The First English Civil War began in August 1642, and in late 1643 Bourne travelled to England, where he was appointed major in a regiment of infantry raised by Thomas Rainsborough for the Eastern Association. Several members of this unit were returned emigrants like Bourne, among them Israel Stoughton, John Leverett, a future Governor of Massachusetts, and Stephen Winthrop, son of John Winthrop, the current governor.

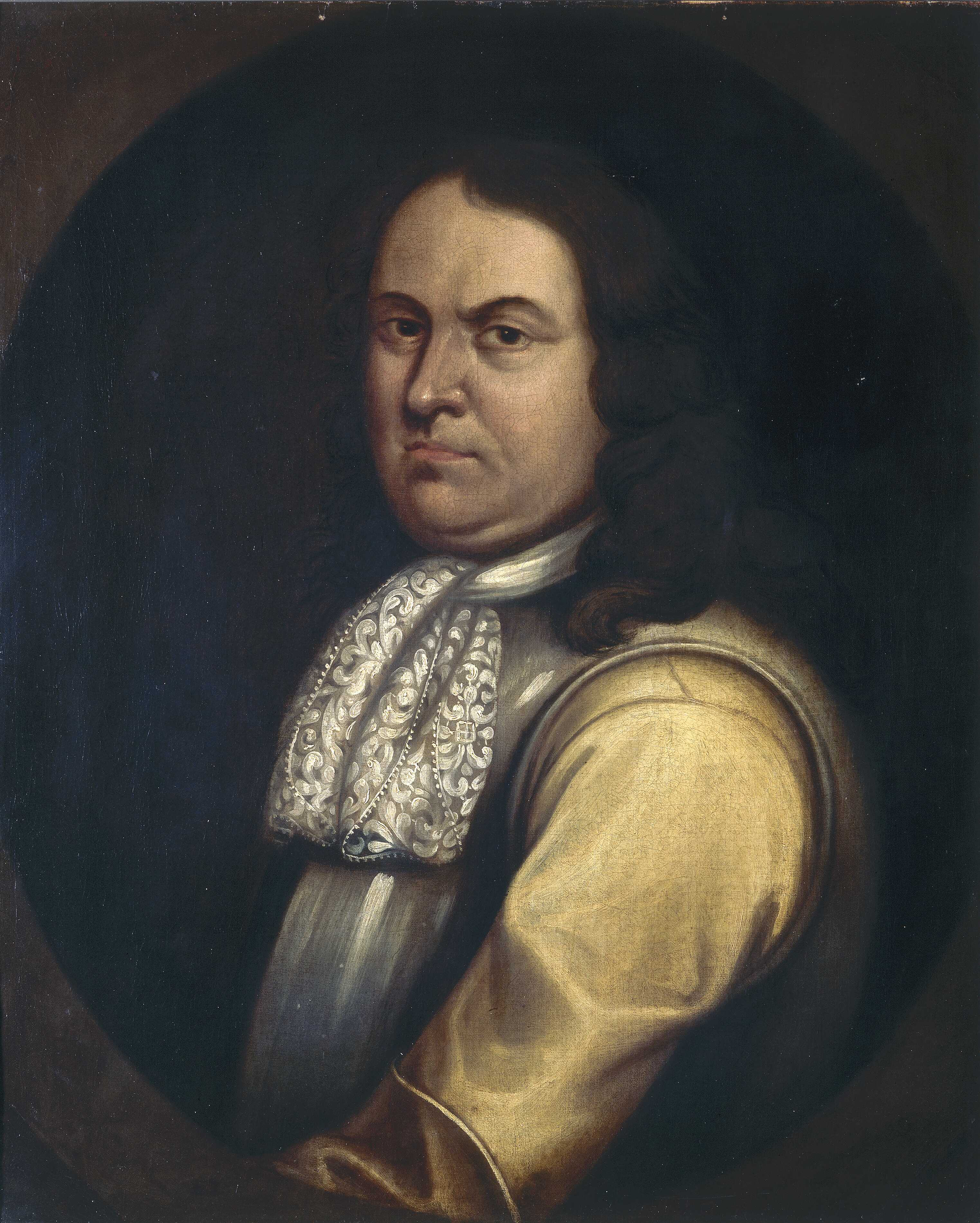
Admiral Robert Blake, Bourne's commander during the First Anglo-Dutch War

In October 1644, Bourne took part in an operation to expel a Royalist garrison from Crowland Abbey, but resigned his commission in early 1645, and returned to Boston. This may have been due to his Anabaptist sympathies, which he shared with Rainsborough and Leverett. Viewed as dangerous radicals by mainstream Protestants, including the moderate Presbyterians who dominated Parliament and had to approve the appointment of officers to the New Model Army, Anabaptists were widely persecuted in both Europe and the North American colonies. Leverett returned to Boston at the same time, where the two campaigned for amendments to Massachusetts laws that banned Anabaptists. When these efforts failed, Bourne sailed for England with his family in December 1646.

He spent the next few years building up his trade with New England, then became captain of the Commonwealth warship Speaker when the Anglo-Scottish war began in 1650. He was appointed commander-in-chief of the North Sea Squadron, providing support for land operations in Scotland, his brother John being captain of one of his ships. This was also a period of tension between the Commonwealth and Dutch Republic over trade, and in May 1652 Bourne was senior officer in The Downs when a Dutch fleet under Maarten Tromp anchored near Dover. Now using the Andrew as his flagship, Bourne immediately informed his commander Admiral Robert Blake. This initiated the inconclusive Battle of Dover on 19 May 1652, although the First Anglo-Dutch War did not formally begin until 10 July.

Promoted Rear admiral, on 28 September Bourne also commanded a squadron at the Battle of the Kentish Knock, but despite his good performance in the two battles, it was decided his talents were more urgently needed in administration. In December 1652, he was appointed one of three Commissioners at the Navy Office, responsible for managing the crews, ship repairs and marine supplies. He proved efficient enough to retain this position until the Stuart Restoration in May 1660, when he was replaced by the new regime. Although given permission in 1662 to return to New England with his family, his concerns over the treatment of Anabaptists there remained, and in the end he settled first in Hamburg, then Rotterdam. Bourne moved to Abchurch Lane in London around 1670, where he lived until his death sometime between February and May 1691. As stipulated in his will, he was buried next to his wife Hannah in Bunhill Fields, a graveyard used for Nonconformists.

== Sources ==
- Anderson, R.C (1938). "English Fleet-lists in the First Anglo-Dutch War". The Mariner's Mirror. 24 (4): 429–450. doi:10.1080/00253359.1938.10657308.
- Capp, Bernard (2004). "Bourne, John (bap. 1620, d. 1667)". Oxford Dictionary of National Biography (online ed.). Oxford University Press. doi:10.1093/ref:odnb/37210. (Subscription, Wikipedia Library access or UK public library membership required.)
- Capp, Bernard (2008). "Bourne, Nehemiah (1611–1691)". Oxford Dictionary of National Biography (online ed.). Oxford University Press. doi:10.1093/ref:odnb/3007. (Subscription, Wikipedia Library access or UK public library membership required.)
- Dean, John, ed. (1897). New England Historical and Genealogical Register. Vol. 51 (1998 ed.). Heritage Books. ISBN 978-0788408663.
