= HMS Anglesea (1742) =

British Navy ship

History

Great Britain
- Name: HMS Anglesea
- Ordered: 28 September 1741
- Builder: Hugh Blaydes, Port of Hull
- Laid down: November 1741
- Launched: 3 November 1742
- Commissioned: 6 February 1742 at Hull
- In service: 1742–1745
- Stricken: 29 March 1745
- Fate: Captured by the French, 1745

History

France
- Name: L'Anglesea
- Acquired: 29 March 1745
- In service: 1745–1753

General characteristics
- Class & type: 44-gun fifth-rate frigate
- Tons burthen: 711 48/94 bm
- Length: 126 ft 0 in (38.4 m) (gun deck); 102 ft 3 in (31.2 m) (keel)
- Beam: 36 ft 2 in (11.0 m)
- Depth of hold: 15 ft 6 in (4.72 m)
- Sail plan: Full-rigged ship
- Complement: 250
- Armament: 44 guns comprising: Gun deck: 20 × 18-pounder guns; Upper deck: 20 × 9-pounder guns; Quarterdeck: 4 × 6-pounder guns (from 1743)

HMS Anglesea was a 44-gun fifth-rate frigate of the Royal Navy which saw service between 1742 and 1745, during the War of the Austrian Succession. In 1745 Anglesea was captured in an engagement with the 50-gun French ship of the line Apollon. The capture of the vessel resulted in an amendment of the British Articles of War, regarding the responsibility of commanding officers to do their utmost to engage with the enemy.

Following her capture, the ship was taken into French service as L'Anglesea. She was removed from the French Navy lists in 1753.

== Engagement with Apollon ==
On 28 March 1745, Anglesea sailed out of Kinsale under the command of Captain Jacob Elton. Anglesea was ordered to join other warships in the English Channel and patrol for French shipping. On the afternoon of 29 March, a large sail was spotted windward (upwind) of Anglesea, with the unknown vessel heading in the direction of the British warship. Captain Elton believed the ship to be the 60-gun HMS Augusta and took no action in response to the sail. The vessel was in fact the 50-gun French ship of the line Apollon, which had detected Anglesea and made ready for an engagement.

When it was discovered that the approaching ship flew French colors, Captain Elton ordered Anglesea's mainsail raised in preparation for a flight. The effect of this action was to blow the ship to one side and flood the lower gun decks of the vessel. Apollon laid down a withering fire onto Anglesea, with the first broadside killing both Captain Elton and the ship's master, leaving Second Lieutenant Baker Phillips in command. Apollon's position granted it the advantage in maneuverability, and soon the British warship was crippled by repeated broadsides. Several more minutes saw Anglesea lose 60 men killed or wounded by French fire. Seeing no other option, Phillips surrendered the vessel, an action for which he would later be executed.

Following her capture, the vessel was commissioned into the French Navy as L'Anglesea. She remained in French service for eight years and was decommissioned in 1753.
