= James Vashon =

Royal Navy officer (1742–1827)

Admiral James Vashon
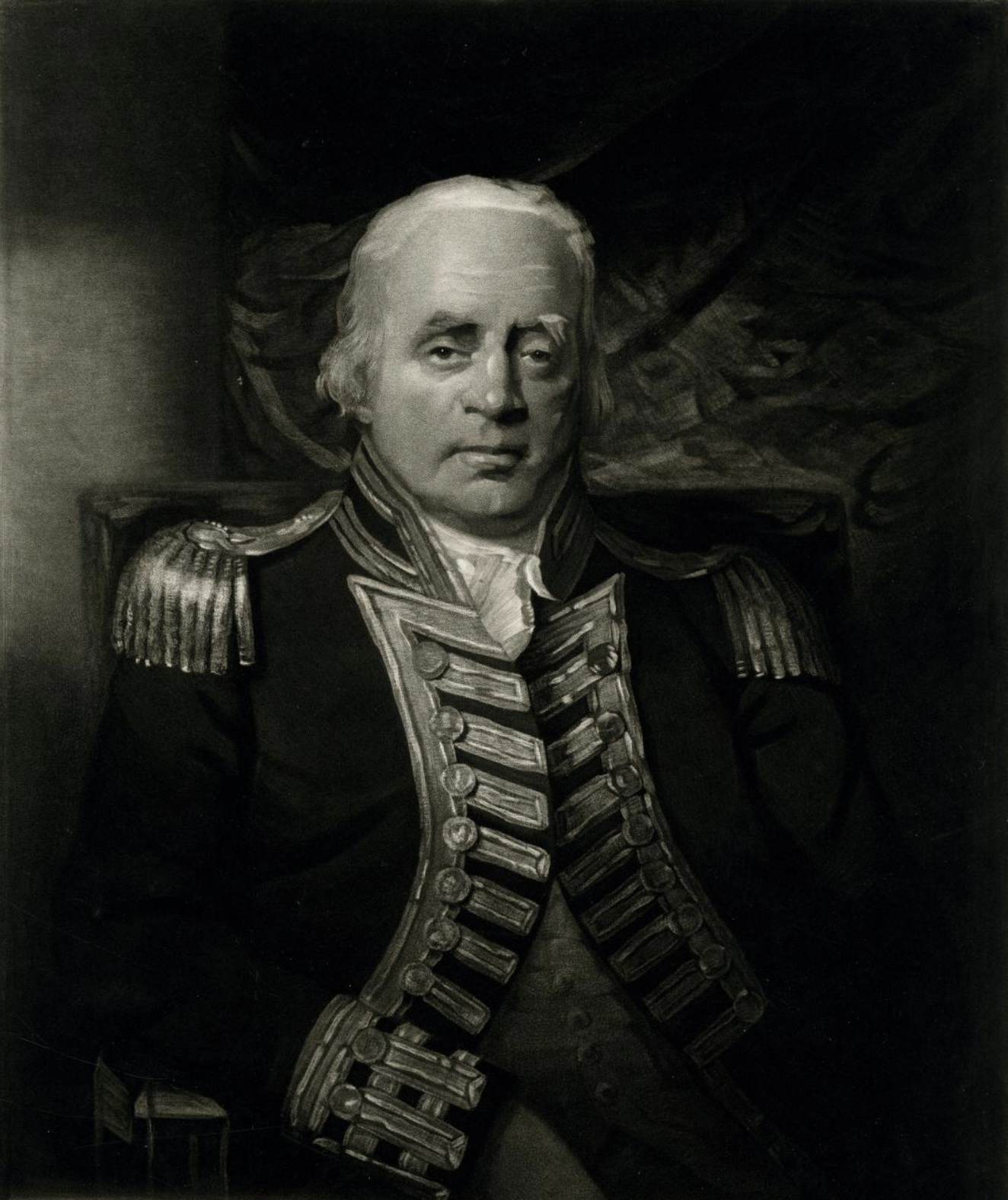
- Engraving by John Young after a George Watson portrait, 1809
- Born: 9 August 1742; Eye, Herefordshire
- Died: 20 October 1827 (aged 85); Ludlow, Shropshire
- Military career
- Allegiance: Great Britain; United Kingdom
- Branch: Royal Navy
- Service years: 1755–1827
- Rank: Admiral
- Commands: HMS Alert; HMS Prince William; HMS Formidable; HMS Sibyl; HMS Europa; HMS Ardent; HMS St Albans; HMS Dreadnought; HMS Pompee; Leith Station
- Conflicts: Seven Years' War; American War of Independence; Battle of the Saintes; French Revolutionary Wars; Napoleonic Wars

Admiral James Vashon (9 August 1742 – 20 October 1827) was a British officer of the Royal Navy. He saw service during the Seven Years' War, the American War of Independence and the French Revolutionary and Napoleonic Wars. He was first captain of HMS Dreadnought, between 1801 and 1802. Previously, he had commanded Alert (1781), Europa (1786), and Formidable.

Washington's Vashon Island was named after him by the explorer George Vancouver, who had been Vashon's subordinate in Europa. Vashon rose to the rank of Admiral of the White. He is reported to have been stationed for many years in the West Indies.

== Family and early life ==
James Vashon was born on 9 August 1742 in the village of Eye, near Leominster, Herefordshire. He was the son of the Vicar of Eye, the Reverend James Volant Vashon. The family was descended from Peter Vashon, a Huguenot apothecary c. 1636, who had immigrated from Paris. The family name is of French origins and became English. James Vashon entered the Royal Navy at age thirteen, in 1755, and first served aboard the 28-gun frigate HMS Revenge under Captain Cornwall. As a midshipman he served on a number of vessels and saw combat service in the Mediterranean, the coast of North America, and in the Caribbean. In 1763 he passed his examination for lieutenant, but continued to serve as a midshipman until 1772 for lack of a lieutenant's posting. Vashon was serving on HMS Quebec when the Seven Years' War ended and went ashore on half-pay until 1774 when the Navy began re-arming for the approaching American War of Independence.

== American War of Independence ==
He was appointed lieutenant on the frigate HMS Maidstone and was assigned to the West Indies. He was quickly promoted to first-lieutenant when Lieutenant Peter Rainier (for whom Mount Rainier was named) was promoted and transferred off the Maidstone. He achieved recognition with his action during the capture of the French ship Lion, when he was given command of the prize and over 200 prisoners, and successfully reached the British naval base at Antigua. As a reward, he was returned to England, promoted to commander, and given command of the 14-gun brig HMS Alert. During 1780–81, Alert served on convoy duty in the North Atlantic and in the Caribbean. During the second tour in the Caribbean for the Alert, Joseph Baker (after whom Mount Baker was named) served as cabin boy for Commander Vashon. Because of distinguished action as commander of the Alert during the battle of the Saintes, Vashon was promoted to captain and given command of the 64-gun ship-of-the-line HMS Prince William. He then served as flag captain aboard HMS Formidable, and then the frigate HMS Sibyl. With the end of the American wars, Vashon again went ashore on half pay in 1783. He and his wife Jane Bethell, who married in 1779, had a son in 1784, but Jane died suddenly in 1786. Vashon then married Sarah Rainier, the sister of his earlier shipmate Peter Rainier.

== French Revolutionary and Napoleonic Wars ==
In late 1786 Vashon was recalled to service and took command of the 50-gun HMS Europa, where serving under him were Midshipmen James Baker and Peter Puget, and Lieutenant George Vancouver, who would become significant in future explorations of the area of Washington state. Vashon commanded a series of ships during the period from 1789 to 1804 including the 64-gun ships HMS Ardent, HMS St Albans, HMS Dreadnought, and the 80-gun HMS Pompee. It was during this period that George Vancouver commanded the Pacific Northwest expedition that bears his name and during which Vancouver named a number of prominent features of the Northwest after his colleagues and friends in the Royal Navy. On 28 May 1792 Vancouver named Vashon's Island in honour of Captain Vashon. In 1842 Charles Wilkes of the United States Exploring Expedition named Maury Island as a separate island and the usage began to change to Vashon Island.

In April 1804 Vashon was promoted to Rear-Admiral in command of the Leith Station, Scotland with his flag aboard HMS Roebuck. He instituted a formal convoy system out of Leith to protect this vital shipping route, and was so successful that he was promoted to Vice-Admiral in 1808. When Vashon decided to retire in late 1808, the merchants and leaders of Leith were so pleased that they gave him a public dinner, awarded him two commemorative plates, and honoured him as a Freeman of the City of Edinburgh.

== After the Navy ==
Vashon retired to Ludlow where he lived at Number 54 Broad Street (which is marked with a Ludlow Civic Society blue plaque). He was promoted to Admiral in 1814, and died on 27 October 1827 at the age of 85. He was buried at St Laurence Church in Ludlow.

== Sources ==
- Wing, Robert C. (1992). Joseph Baker. Gray Beard Publications: Seattle. ISBN 978-0933686021.
