= Yarmouth Roads =

Coastal feature in Norfolk, England

Coordinates: 52°35′N 1°47′E

- Channel
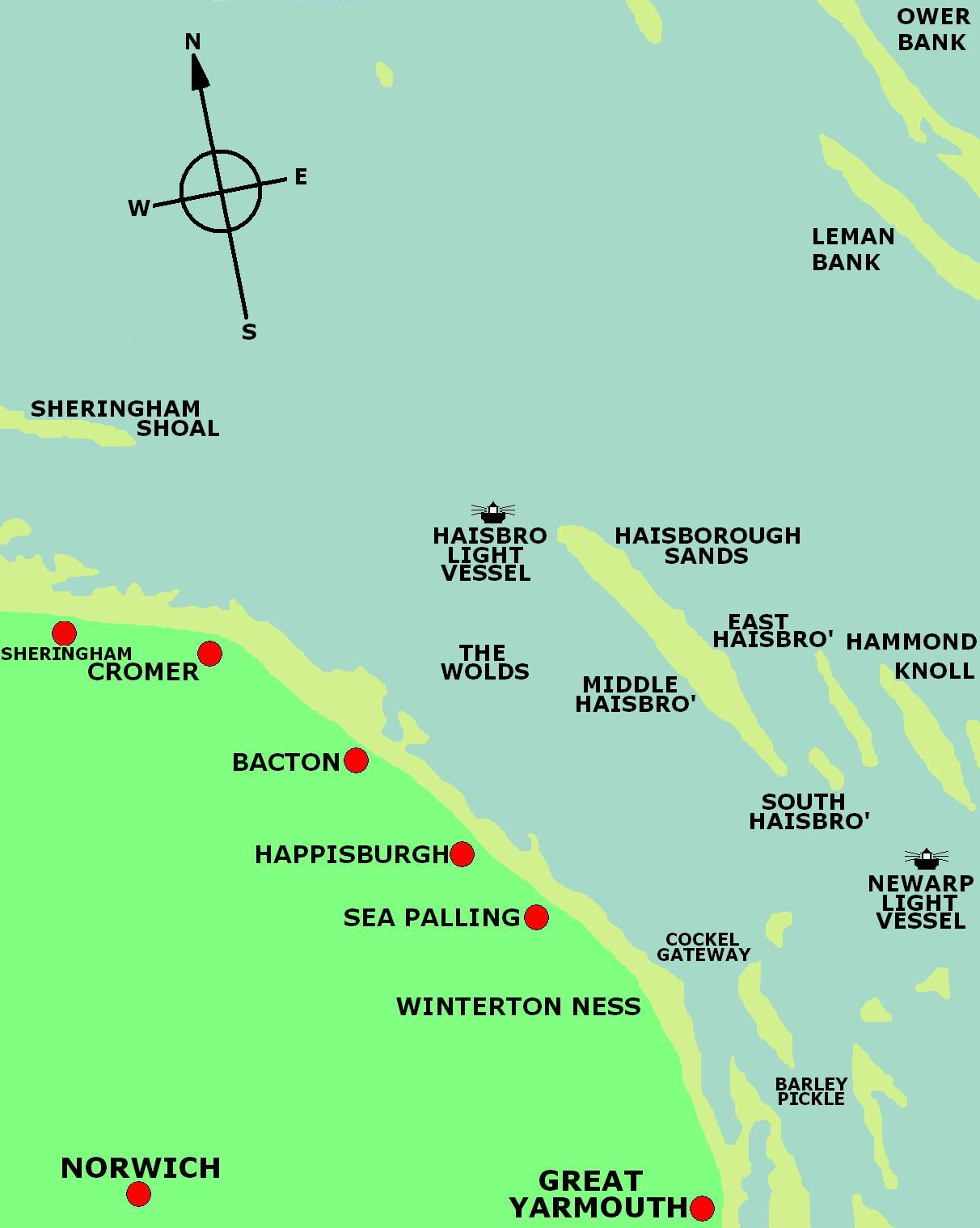
- The map shows the position of Cockle Gateway, the principal northern channel into Yarmouth Roads.
- Interactive map of Yarmouth Roads
- Location: Southern North Sea, United Kingdom

Yarmouth Roads is a coastal feature in Norfolk, England that was used by merchant and naval ships as an anchorage or roadstead off Great Yarmouth.

== Description ==
The following is a description of Yarmouth Roads that appeared in The Nautical Magazine and Naval Chronicle for 1837.

There have always been considered two principle channels or gatways into Yarmouth roads - one at the northern extreme called the Cockle gatway, or between Cockle and Barber sands on the one side, and the Sea Heads and Scroby on the other side; and the other called St. Nicolas gatway, leading in from the S.E. between the Corton sand on the one side, and the Kettle Bottom on the other. This latter was always used by the north sea fleet, and is still preferred by the larger class of merchant-vessels, and some deep laden colliers, to a secondary channel existing at the southern extreme of the roads; and it is to this principal channel into Yarmouth roads, that I am anxious in this communication, to draw the attention of my fellow seamen frequenting the eastern coast, and which I shall endeavour to do by an introductory remark or two.

== Other channels into the roads ==
There have been a number of other channels into yarmouth roads including: The St Nicholas Gat and the Hewett Channel.

== Royal Navy ==
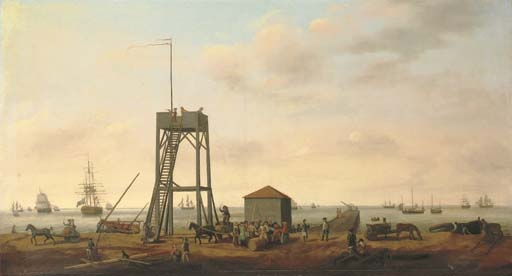
The 28-gun frigate 'Surprize' lying in Yarmouth Roads, off Great Yarmouth in 1775

Yarmouth Roads was one of a number of strategic East Coast anchorages used by the Royal Navy for its fleets between the 13th and 19th centuries. Yarmouth was the headquarters of the English Navy's, Admiral of the North and his naval units from 1294 to 1412. Between 1652 and 1654 it was used by the Royal Navy for stationing its fleets during the First Anglo-Dutch War. From 1781 to 1815 it was used as the base for the North Sea fleet. In 1801 it was the main assembly point for the British Fleet before its engagement at the Battle of Copenhagen.

== See also ==
- Roadstead
