= Thomas Smith (Royal Navy officer, died 1762) =

Royal Navy officer and colonial administrator

Admiral Thomas Smith
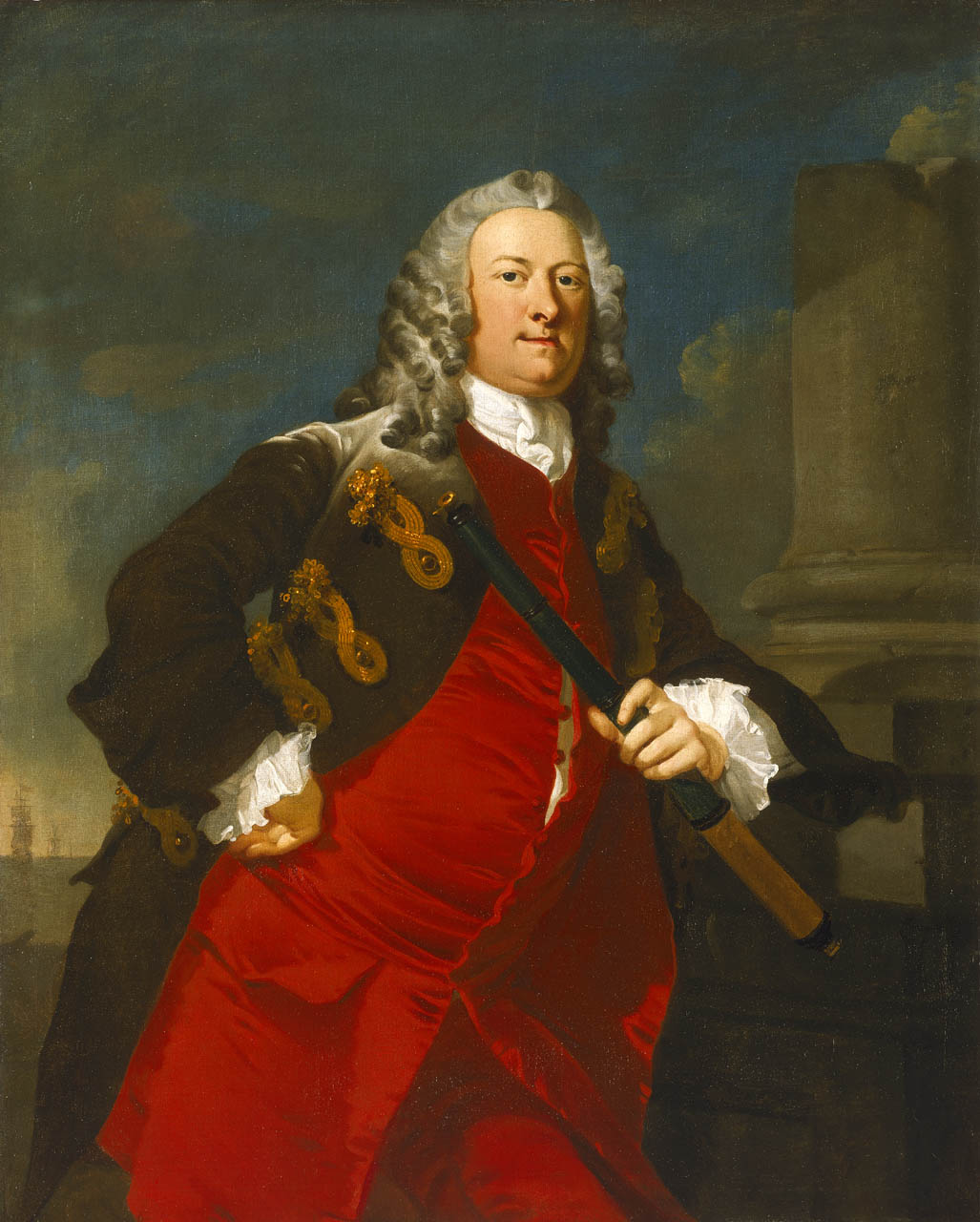
- Portrait by Richard Wilson
- Born: 1707
- Died: 28 August 1762 (aged 54–55)
- Military career
- Allegiance: Great Britain
- Branch: Royal Navy
- Rank: Admiral of the Blue
- Commands: HMS Success; HMS Dursley Galley; HMS Royal Sovereign; Newfoundland Station; North Sea Fleet; Leith Station; Downs Station

Viceregal styles of Thomas Smith
- Reference style: His Excellency
- Spoken style: Your Excellency

Admiral of the Blue Thomas Smith (1707 – 28 August 1762) was a Royal Navy officer and colonial administrator, credited with the invention of the divisional system that remains in use in the British navy. He served as Commander-in-Chief, North Sea, Commander-in-Chief, Leith and Commander-in-Chief, the Downs.

== Early life ==
Born in England around 1707, Smith was the illegitimate son of Sir Thomas Lyttelton and a woman of whom details are unknown. He was raised a member of the Lyttelton family, who provided for Smith's education and aided him in the beginnings of his career in the Royal Navy.

== Early naval career ==
The precise date as to when Smith entered the Royal Navy is unknown, but his first notable appointment in the Service was to the position of junior lieutenant aboard the Royal Oak on 6 February 1728, at the appointment of his commanding officer Sir Charles Wager. In June of the same year he was moved to the 44-gun Gosport under the command of Captain Duncombe Drake.

While a lieutenant aboard the Gosport, Smith attracted great controversy in an incident involving the French corvette Gironde on 23 November 1728. At the time of the incident the Gosport was harboured in Plymouth Sound and Smith was acting-commanding officer due to all of his superiors being ashore. While in command, a French corvette that had entered the Sound for shelter passed the Gosport while departing, and Smith signaled for the French captain ‘to haul in his pennant in respect to the king of Great Britain's colours’. Having already saluted the Royal Citadel of Plymouth, the French captain took this as an affront and the French authorities, upon receiving his report, presented an official letter of complaint to the British government. Smith was thus court-martialed and summarily dismissed from the Navy by king's order on 27 March 1729. However, due to popular outcry at his dismissal, he was reinstated at the same rank and made second lieutenant of the Enterprise on 12 May of the same year, receiving the nickname 'Tom o'Ten Thousand' from his fellow seamen.

On 5 May 1730, Smith was promoted to the rank of captain and given the command of the 24-gun Success. Two years after this Smith was given command of the Dursley Galley, a 20-gun fast frigate stationed in the Mediterranean, mainly tasked with patrolling against Barbary Pirates. Remaining mainly in the Mediterranean, Smith remained in this position for a decade.

== Tenures as Governor of Newfoundland ==
In 1740 Smith transferred to the 50-gun Romney, on board which he sailed back to Great Britain. Smith then departed aboard the Romney with the fishing fleet to Newfoundland, where he was to become Commodore-Governor. He only held this position for one year, resigning in April 1742, but was appointed again in 1743 after a brief return to the Mediterranean.

== Late naval career and the creation of the divisional system ==
Smith left the post of governor for good and was placed in command of the 100-gun Royal Sovereign in September 1745. On 11 February 1745 he was appointed Commander-in-Chief, North Sea a post he held till December 1746, during this period Smith spent a lot of time organising anti-invasion defences off the coast of Suffolk and Essex aboard the 40-gun Hastings. In February 1746 he replaced John Byng as Commander-in-Chief, Leith, a position he stayed in until January 1747. Smith was promoted to Vice-Admiral of the White in 1748, and in August 1755 he was made Commander-in-Chief, the Downs.

Soon after taking command of the Downs Squadron in 1755, Smith began to draft a scheme to combat the problems regarding relations between the officers and the men in the Royal Navy. Under this system the lieutenants on board a ship would be placed in charge of a division of the ship's company, and would be responsible for the health, welfare and efficiency of the men under their jurisdiction. This system became known as the divisional system. While originally confined to Smith's Downs Squadron, it soon spread to other ships in the Service and was widely, though not universally admired, by the end of the Seven Years' War. By 1765 the system appears to have been the structure of choice for ships in the Royal Navy. A very efficient arrangement, Smith's divisional system resulted in increased efficiency and closer control, as well as improved communications between the officers and men on board.

On 8 December 1756 he advanced to Vice-Admiral of the Red. In December 1756 he was ordered back from the Downs to preside over the trial of Admiral John Byng, at which Smith apparently did his utmost (albeit unsuccessfully) to see that the court's recommendation of leniency was followed. Smith then returned to the Downs Squadron on 24 February 1757 after promotion to the rank of Admiral of the Blue, but ill health forced Smith to declare his retirement the following year.

== Death ==
Thomas Smith died at his Rockingham Hall residence on 28 August 1762.

== See also ==
- Governors of Newfoundland
- List of people of Newfoundland and Labrador

Political offices
Preceded by Henry Medley	Commodore Governor of Newfoundland; First Term 1741 — 1741	Succeeded by John Byng
Preceded by John Byng	Commodore Governor of Newfoundland; Second Term 1743 — 1743	Succeeded by Charles Hardy
