= Britt, Ontario =

Community in unincorporated Wallbridge, Ontario

Britt
- Rural area
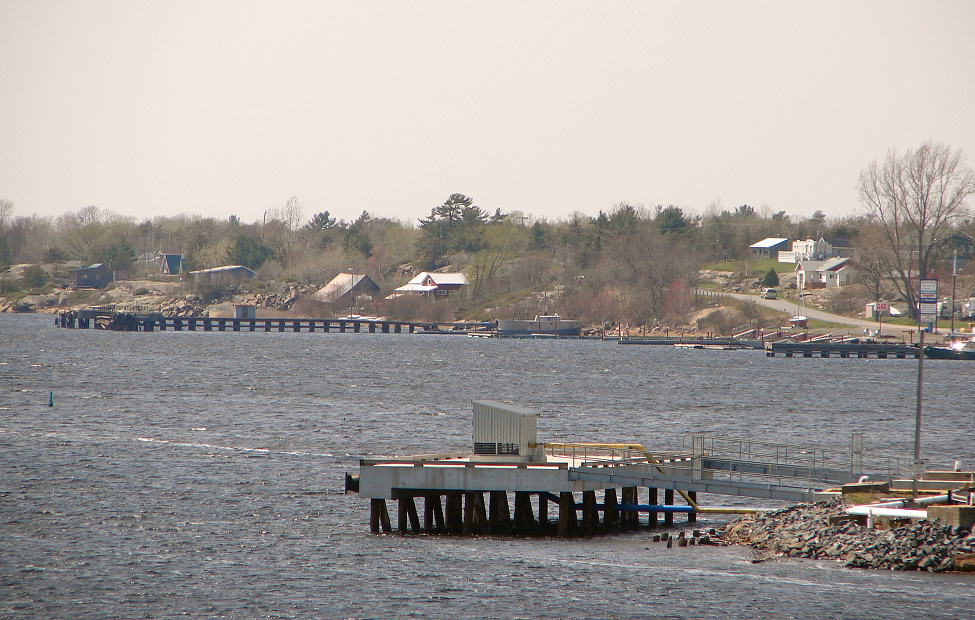
- Britt as seen across Byng Inlet

- Location within Parry Sound District Location within Southern Ontario
- Coordinates: 45°47′N 80°32′W
- Country: Canada
- Province: Ontario
- Unincorporated township: Wallbridge
- District: Parry Sound

Britt is a community in the Canadian province of Ontario, located in the unincorporated township of Wallbridge in the Parry Sound District.

The community is located on the north shore of the Magnetawan River at Byng Inlet, approximately five kilometres west of Highway 69, at the end of Highway 526.

Like its neighbouring community of Byng Inlet on the south shore, Britt was originally a sawmill village, known as Byng Inlet North when the Burton Mill located there in 1880. As the lumber industry in this area had reached its peak, prior to the building of the CPR between 1903 and 1908, the community on the north shore was established as a port for receiving coal, required for the railway's steam locomotives. It was after this, that Byng Inlet North was renamed Britt for Thomas Britt, the CPR Superintendent of Fuels.

The community is not an incorporated municipality, but part of the Unorganized Centre Parry Sound District and is administered by a local services board.

The village is name-checked in Stompin’ Tom Connors’s song, “Around the Bay and Back Again,” from his 1969 album On Tragedy Trail with Stompin’ Tom Connors.

== Demographics ==
In the 2021 Census of Population conducted by Statistics Canada, Britt had a population of 289 living in 163 of its 307 total private dwellings, a change of −1.4% from its 2016 population of 293. With a land area of 37.56 km^{2} (14.50 sq mi), it had a population density of 7.7/km^{2} (19.9/sq mi) in 2021.

Population of Britt
Name	Population (2021)	Population (2016)	Change	Land area (km^{2})	Population density
Britt part A	284	273	+4.0%	34.3	8.3/km^{2}
Britt part B	5	20	−75.0%	3.26	1.5/km^{2}
Total	289	293	−1.4%	37.56	7.7/km^{2}
