= Shawanaga Township =

- Geographic township
- Location in Southern Ontario
- Coordinates: 45°32′02″N 80°18′03″W
- Country: Canada
- Province: Ontario
- District: Parry Sound
- Part: Unorganized, Centre

Shawanaga is an unincorporated geographic township in the Unorganized Centre Part of Parry Sound District in central Ontario, Canada.

The communities of Madigans and Skerryvore are in the township, as is a portion of Round Lake Provincial Park. Provincial Highway 69 runs through the east of the township.

== See also ==
- List of townships in Ontario
