= Unorganized Centre Parry Sound District =

- Unorganized area
- Parry Sound, Unorganized, Centre Part
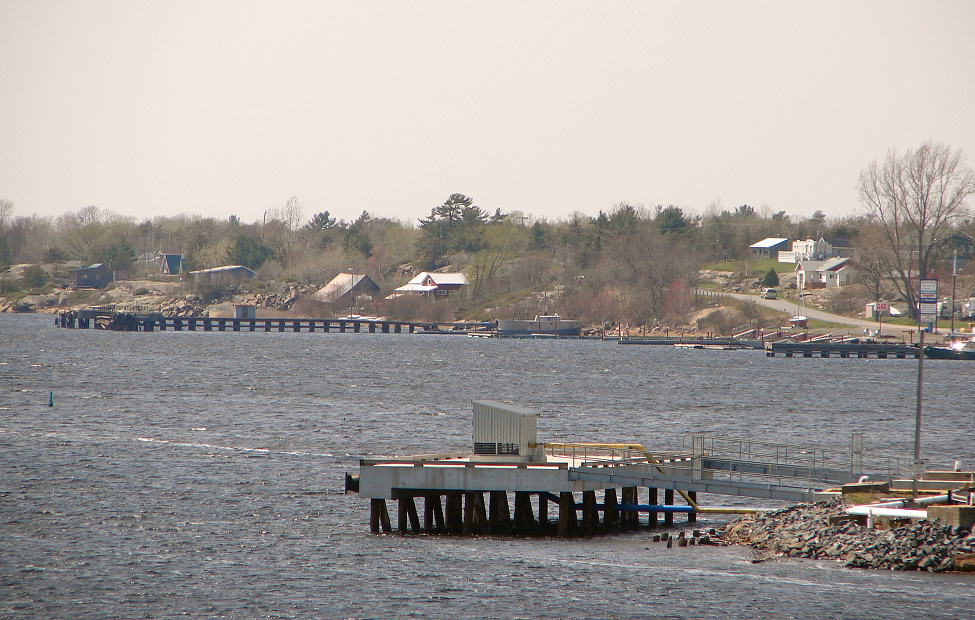
- Britt and Byng Inlet

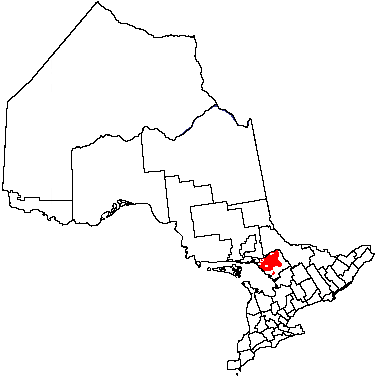
- Coordinates: 45°55′N 80°00′W
- Country: Canada
- Province: Ontario
- District: Parry Sound

Government
  - Fed. riding: Parry Sound-Muskoka
  - Prov. riding: Parry Sound—Muskoka

Area
  - Land: 2,587.29 km^{2} (998.96 sq mi)

Population (2021)
  - Total: 2,495
  - Density: 1/km^{2} (2.6/sq mi)
- Time zone: UTC−05:00 (EST)
  - Summer (DST): UTC−04:00 (EDT)
- Postal Code: P0G, P0H
- Area codes: 705, 249

Unorganized Centre Parry Sound District is an unorganized area in central Ontario, Canada, between Georgian Bay and Lake Nipissing in the District of Parry Sound. It is made up of geographic townships which have no governing bodies and which are not incorporated as municipalities. The territory consists of two non-contiguous areas, with the main part located directly south of the French River and Lake Nipissing, and east of Georgian Bay. Shawanaga Township is a small exclave south of it along Highway 69.

Its area has been gradually shrinking as surrounding municipalities annex portions of the unorganized area.

== Local services boards ==
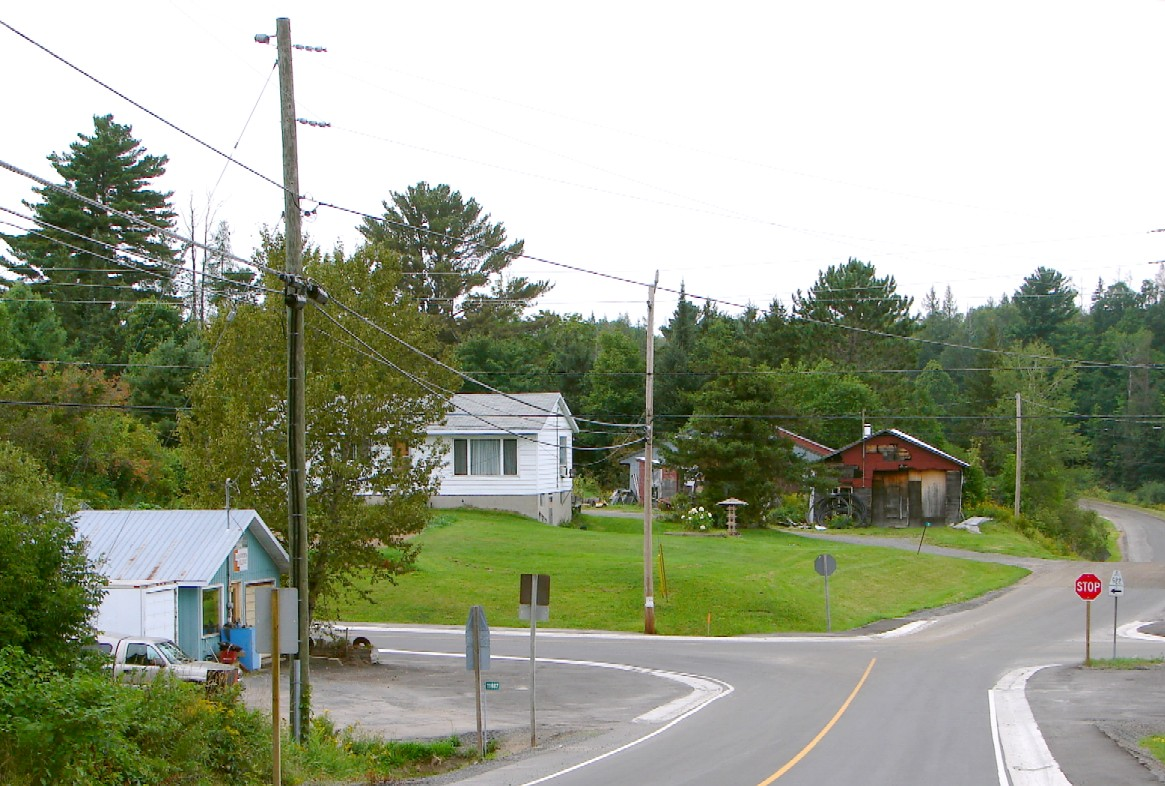
Loring

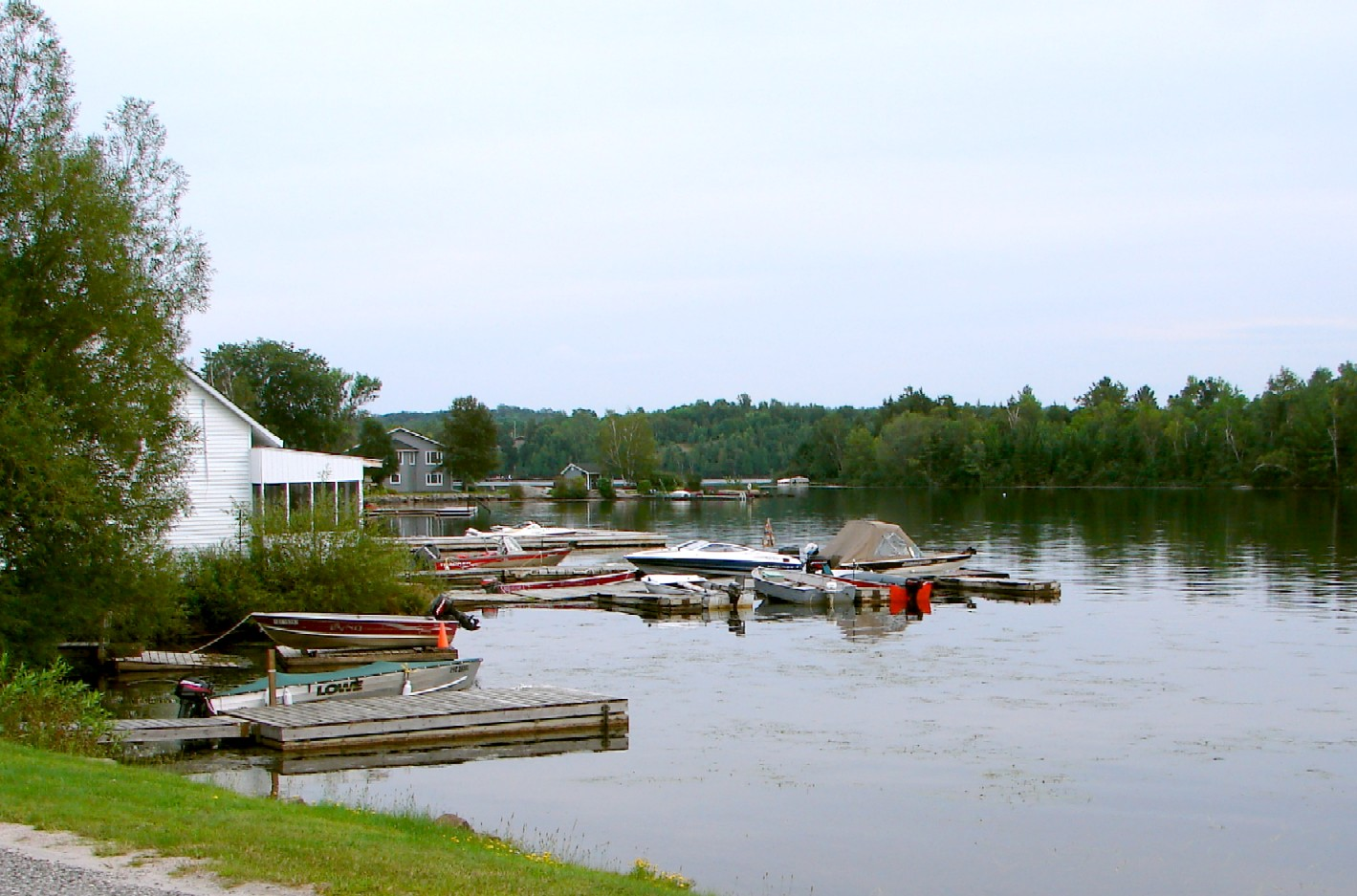
Port Loring

- Britt and Byng Inlet
- Loring, Port Loring and District
- Restoule

== Townships ==
List of geographic townships with its communities:

- Blair Township (Ess Narrows Landing, Lost Channel)
- East Mills Township (Arnstein, Loring, Port Loring)
- Hardy Township (Spring Creek)
- Henvey Township (Britt Station, Still River)
- Lount Township (Bummer's Roost, Rye, Wattenwyle)
- McConkey Township (Fleming's Landing)
- Mowat Township (Bon Air, Cranberry, Key River, Ludgate, Mowat, Pakesley, Wanikewin)
- Patterson Township (Restoule)
- Pringle Township (Bear Valley, Carr, Farleys Corners, Golden Valley)
- Shawanaga Township (Madigans)
- Wallbridge Township (Britt, Byng Inlet, Drocourt, Harris Lake, North Magnetawan)
- Wilson Township

In addition, the division also includes two geographic townships which are entirely unpopulated:

- Brown Township
- Harrison Township

== Demographics ==
Canada census – Parry Sound, Unorganized, Centre Part community profile

	2021	2016	2011
Population	2,495 (+16.4% from 2016)	2143 (-5.6% from 2011)	2199 (-9.3% from 2006)
Land area	2,587.29 km^{2} (998.96 sq mi)	2,698.17 km^{2} (1,041.77 sq mi)	2,697.64 km^{2} (1,041.56 sq mi)
Population density	1.0/km^{2} (2.6/sq mi)	0.8/km^{2} (2.1/sq mi)	0.8/km^{2} (2.1/sq mi)
Median age	61.2 (M: 61.6, F: 61.2)	61.0 (M: 60.8, F: 61.2)
Private dwellings	2,703 (total) 1,263 (occupied)	2,530 (total) 1,047 (occupied)	2637 (total)
Median household income	$57,600	$48,032

References: 2021 2016 2011

Historical census populations –
Parry Sound, Unorganized, Centre Part

Year	Pop.	±%
1976	3,400	—
1981	3,241	−4.7%
1986	3,122	−3.7%
1991	3,394	+8.7%
1996	3,336	−1.7%

Year	Pop.	±%
2001	2,198	−34.1%
2006	2,424	+10.3%
2011	2,271	−6.3%
2016	2,143	−5.6%
2021	2,495	+16.4%

2011 Population figure based on revised count. Population counts are not adjusted for boundary changes.
Source: Statistics Canada

Mother tongue (2021):

- English as first language: 92.4%
- French as first language: 3.0%
- English and French as first languages: 0.4%
- Other as first language: 3.6%

== See also ==
- List of townships in Ontario
