= French ship Apollon (1740) =

History

France
- Name: Apollon
- Launched: 1740
- Fate: Scuttled in 1758

General characteristics
- Type: Ship of the line
- Displacement: 1528 tonneaux
- Tons burthen: 800 port tonneaux
- Decks: 2

Apollon was an 18th-century ship of the line in service with the Royal French Navy. She was launched in 1740 at Rochefort as a two-decked ship of the line of the Vaisseaux de 50 class of warships. During her career, she was armed with between 50 and 58 canon. During the War of the Austrian Succession, she engaged and captured the 45-gun HMS Anglesea after the British ship was rendered inoperable. Apollon was scuttled in Louisbourg Harbor to prevent her from falling into British hands during the Siege of Louisbourg (1758). The remains of the warship, along with several other ships in wrecked in Louisbourg harbor, were later salvaged by the citizens of Louisbourg and used as building materials.
