= Leith Station =

Commander-in-Chief at Leith
- Active: 1745–1825
- Country: United Kingdom
- Branch: Royal Navy
- Role: Convoy Protection, Trade Protection
- Part of: Royal Navy
- Garrison/HQ: Leith Roads, Leith, Scotland

Commanders
- Notable commanders: Rear-Admiral John Byng

The Commander-in-Chief, Leith formally known as the Commander-in-Chief at Leith and on the Coast of Scotland was a military commander and formation of the Royal Navy from 1745 to 1825.

== History ==
Royal Navy forces first began operating from Leith between 1709 and 1713 during the War of the Spanish Succession when the then Lord High Admiral Thomas Herbert ordered a new squadron to Leith Roads naval anchorage which was then placed under the command of the Provost of Edinburgh Sir Patrick Johnston. Leith was initially used as an important port to protect convoys operating between the Orkney islands and Newcastle upon Tyne and to ports on the other side of the North Sea. The station was established in 1745 at the Port of Leith during the time of the French Revolutionary Wars and existed until 1825. The station throughout its existence was under the command of Commander-in-Chief, Leith who also duel-hatted in the role as Port Admiral, Leith.

== Commander-in-Chief, Leith ==
Incomplete list of post holders included:

- Rear-Admiral–John Byng–1745-1746
- Rear-Admiral Thomas Smith February 1746 – January 1747.
- Commodore Sir Alexander Cochrane 1793
- Vice-Admiral of the Red—Richard Rodney Bligh, 1803 – 1804
- Rear-Admiral of the White–James Vashon–April 1804–1808 (promoted 9.11.1805 Rear-Admiral of the Red)
- Rear-Admiral of the Red–Edmund Nagle–July 1808 – 1812 (promoted to V.Adm July 1810)
- Rear-Admiral William Johnstone Hope Nov. 1813 – August 1818
- Rear-Admiral: Robert Waller Otway August 1818 – 24 November 1821
- Vice-Admiral Sir John P. Beresford 1821–1825
