= Byng Inlet, Ontario =

Coordinates: 45°46′N 80°33′W

Byng Inlet is a ghost town and community in Unorganized Centre Parry Sound District, Ontario, Canada. For a period in the nineteenth century it was home to one of the largest sawmill operations in Canada. The name of the town came from that of the English Admiral John Byng. It is also the name of the body of water, on which the village is situated, on the south shore of the Byng Inlet a widening of the Magnetawan River, near its mouth on Georgian Bay.

The Byng Inlet area is administered as part of Britt's local services board.

== History ==
First established as a mill town in 1869, there have been a number mills at Byng Inlet. At first, growth of the village was sporadic, operations of the mills fluctuating with the changes in the tariffs on lumber exported to the United States, (the market for the output of Georgian Bay mills). Even the panic of 1873 with widespread affects, threatened the lumber industry at Byng Inlet. It would not be until the 1890s that mill workers established their roots, and Byng Inlet became their permanent home.

In 1897 the Holland and Emery Lumber Company of East Tawas, Michigan, relocated their mill from Saginaw Bay, to Byng Inlet. Having acquired the Magnetawan timber berths from Merrill and Ring, (another Michigan lumber firm). Nelson Holland and Temple Emery also acquired the Page mill, from Merrill and Ring in 1899, however, owing to financial difficulty of Mr. Emery, this was subsequently sold and removed.

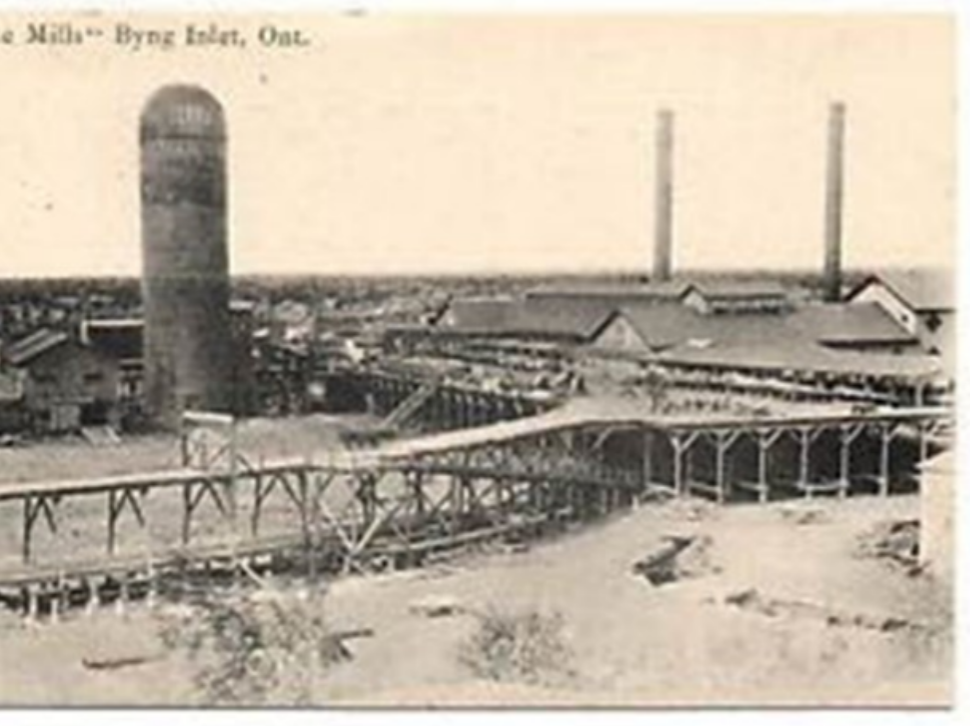
The Graves Lumber Mill, one of the three large lumber mills that made Byng Inlet one of the largest lumber towns in Canada

A new partnership was started with Nelson Holland and L P Graves, along with James Thissel Emery and others. Luther Pomeroy Graves, had been a longtime associate of Nelson Holland, being the head of the firm Graves, Manbert and George, at Black Rock, NY, which marketed Holland and Emery's lumber, forwarding it through the Erie Canal. Temple Emery's nephew, James Thissel Emery, a millwright also a longtime associate of Mr. Holland, had apprenticed at Henry W. Sage's mill in Bay City and at Holland's mill, previously located in East Saginaw.

In the early 1900s Holland and Graves expanded their operations, the connection of the Canadian Pacific Railway through the village, offered new markets for their lumber, which prior to 1908, was only shipped by water. Under the name of Graves, Bigwood and Company, since 1907, William Bigwood of this partnership was the son-in-law of Temple Emery.

As the mill grew, so did the town's population. To accommodate the growing town, a bakery, theatre, hotel and post office were constructed. The mill would continue to operate until it burned in 1912. It was quickly rebuilt and returned to operation in 1913. Approximately 450 people lived in the shanty houses and the 50 or so solid houses in the area. The mill employed some 1250 people, while the town's overall population was 4,200.

In 1927, after the resources dried up and the mill closed, without any other form of industry to keep the population employed, most of the people left. The town currently retains a small permanent population, which is primarily due to the services of nearby Highway 69.

A forestry fire tower was built in the village in the 1950s but was later dismantled. The footings can still be seen.
