= Northern Belle (1875 ship) =

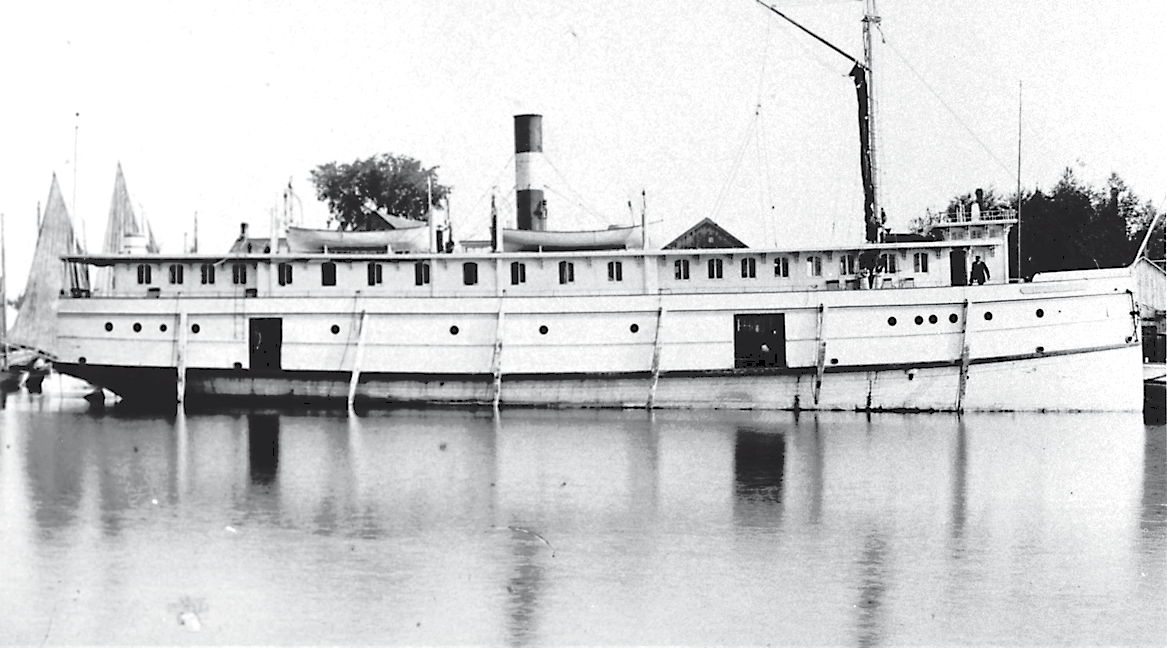

History
- Name: Gladys; Northern Belle
- Owner: Georgian Bay Navigation Company
- Completed: 1875
- Out of service: November 10, 1898
- Fate: Caught fire and grounded in Byng Inlet, Georgian Bay

General characteristics
- Type: Passenger/cargo ship
- Tonnage: 513 GRT
- Length: 129 ft (39 m)
- Beam: 23 ft (7.0 m)
- Draft: 10 ft (3.0 m)

Northern Belle was a steamship that provided service in Ontario, Canada, from 1875 to her accidental destruction by fire in 1898.

Shortly after she was launched, as Gladys, in Marine City, Michigan, she was purchased by the Georgian Bay Navigation Company, which renamed her Northern Belle.

She burned shortly after arriving in Byng Inlet, the mouth of the Magnetawan River, on November 7, 1898. The fire burst out unexpectedly and her captain, C. Jacques, barely had time to beach her. There were no deaths, but not only was her cargo lost, her crew and passengers lost all their possessions.

Her wreck became a popular site for recreational divers.
