= North Sea Squadron =

- Tudor Green Ensign 1485 to 1603
- Active: 1543–1563
- Allegiance: England Kingdom of England
- Branch: Navy Royal
- Type: Squadron
- Role: Patrol
- Part of: Navy Royal
- Garrison/HQ: Newcastle, England.

Commanders
- Notable commanders: Vice-Admiral, Sir John Dudley, Earl of Warwick

The North Sea Squadron was a temporary naval formation of the Tudor Navy Royal during the sixteenth century operating out of Newcastle, England.

Command of the squadron was usually vested in the Vice-Admiral in the North Sea.

== Historical background ==
The North Sea was an important command from the 13th to 15th centuries, when there was an Admiral of the North based at Yarmouth who commanded the Northern Fleet. During the 16th century Admirals and Vice Admirals were appointed to the command in the North Sea, though on a temporary basis. From 1652 to 1654 Yarmouth was used by the Royal Navy for the temporary stationing of its North Sea Fleet during the First Anglo-Dutch War. From 1745 the North Sea Fleet became a permanent formation.

== In command ==
=== Vice-Admiral in the North Sea ===
- Vice Admiral, Sir Francis Bryan, 1543, (also Vice-Admiral of England).
- Vice-Admiral Sir William Woodhouse, February- 1543–1544.
- Vice-Admiral, Sir John Dudley, Earl of Warwick, January-February 1547.
- Vice-Admiral, William Elmes, March 1547.
- Vice-Admiral, Sir John Henshaw, August-December, 1563.
