= John Byng =

Royal Navy officer and politician (1704–1757)

Admiral The Honourable John Byng
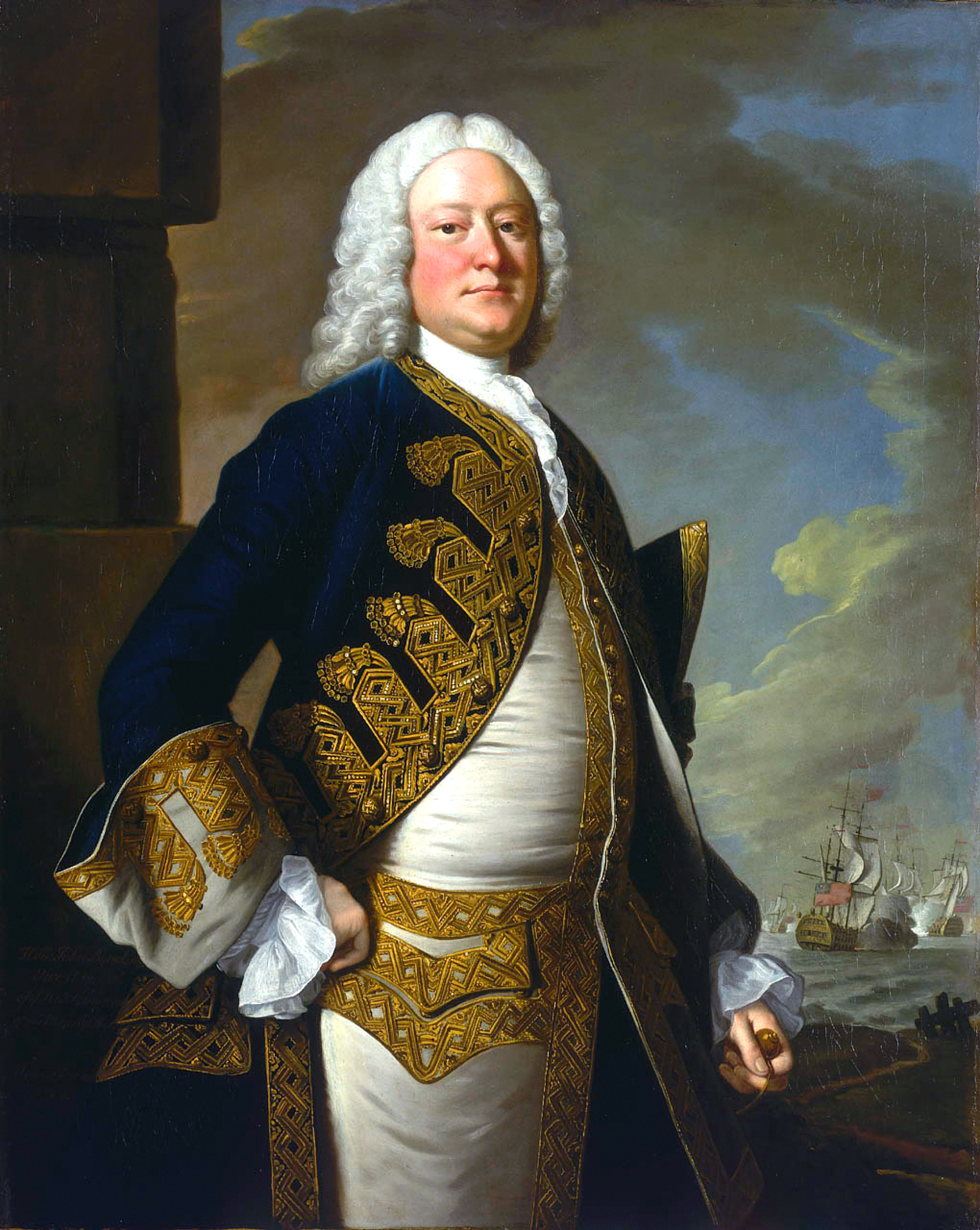
- Portrait of Admiral Byng by Thomas Hudson, 1749
- Born: baptised 29 October 1704; Southill, Bedfordshire, England
- Died: 14 March 1757 (aged 52); Portsmouth, England
- Cause of death: Execution by firing squad
- Military career
- Allegiance: Great Britain
- Branch: Royal Navy
- Service years: 1718–1757
- Rank: Admiral of the Blue
- Commands: Newfoundland Station; Leith Station; Mediterranean Fleet
- Conflicts: War of the Quadruple Alliance; Battle of Cape Passaro; Jacobite rising of 1745; War of the Austrian Succession; Siege of Antibes; Seven Years' War; Battle of Minorca (1756)

Viceregal styles of John Byng
- Reference style: His Excellency
- Spoken style: Your Excellency

Arms of Byng: Quarterly sable and argent in the first quarter a lion rampant of the second

Admiral of the Blue John Byng (baptised 29 October 1704 – 14 March 1757) was a Royal Navy officer and politician who was court-martialled and executed by firing squad. After joining the navy at the age of thirteen, he participated at the Battle of Cape Passaro in 1718. Over the next thirty years he built up a reputation as a solid naval officer and received promotion to vice-admiral in 1747. He also served as Commodore-Governor of Newfoundland Colony in 1742, Commander-in-Chief, Leith, 1745 to 1746 and was a member of Parliament from 1751 until his death.

Byng failed to relieve a besieged British garrison during the Battle of Minorca at the beginning of the Seven Years' War. He had sailed for Minorca at the head of a hastily assembled fleet of vessels, some of which were in poor condition. In the ensuing battle with a French Royal Navy squadron of ships off the Minorcan coast, he was defeated and the fleet under his command considerably damaged. He then elected to withdraw to Gibraltar to repair his ships. Upon return to Britain, Byng was court-martialled and found guilty of breaching the 12th Article of War in failing to "do his utmost" to prevent Minorca from falling to the French. He was sentenced to death and, after pleas for clemency were denied, was shot dead by a firing squad on 14 March 1757.

== Origins ==
John Byng was born at Southill Park in the parish of Southhill in Bedfordshire, England, the fourth son of Rear-Admiral Sir George Byng. His father had supported King William III in his successful bid to be crowned King of England in 1689 and had seen his own stature and fortune grow.

George Byng was a highly skilled naval commander, had won distinction in a series of battles, and was held in esteem by the monarchs whom he served. In 1721, he was rewarded by King George I with a viscountcy, being created Viscount Torrington.

== Career ==
John Byng entered the Royal Navy in March 1718, aged 13, when his father was a well-established admiral at the peak of a uniformly successful career. Early in his career, Byng was assigned to a series of Mediterranean postings. In 1723, aged 19, he was promoted lieutenant and, at 23, rose to become captain of HMS Gibraltar. His Mediterranean service continued until 1739 without much action.

In 1742 he was appointed Commodore-Governor of the British colony of Newfoundland. He was promoted to rear-admiral in 1745 and appointed Commander-in-Chief, Leith, a post he held until 1746. Byng, stationed off Scotland, thwarted the resupply of Bonnie Prince Charlie's forces during the 1745 Jacobite Rebellion. The admiral also assisted the Duke of Cumberland in Britain's crackdown after the Battle of Culloden. He was promoted to vice-admiral in 1747 and appointed Commander-in-Chief of the Mediterranean Fleet. He served as a Member of Parliament for Rochester from 1751 until his death.

=== Wrotham Park ===
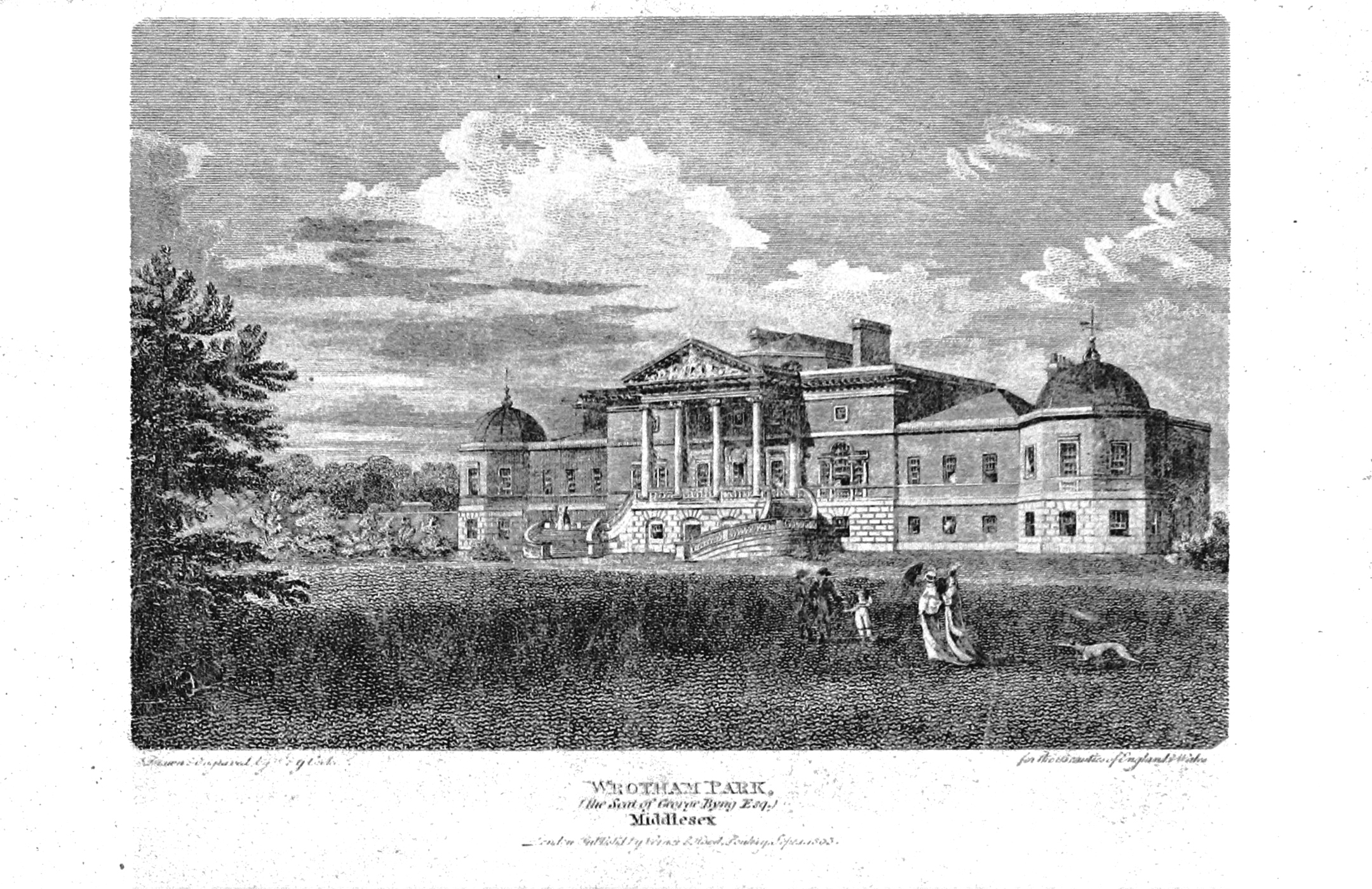
1820 view of Wrotham Park in Hertfordshire, the house built by John Byng

Having purchased a large estate in Hertfordshire, in 1754 Byng commissioned the building within it of Wrotham Park, a Palladian mansion (sited within the present-day bounds of Potters Bar). It is doubtful that he ever lived there. Byng never married and the house was left to a brother's eldest son, a descendant of whom still owns it.

=== Battle of Minorca ===
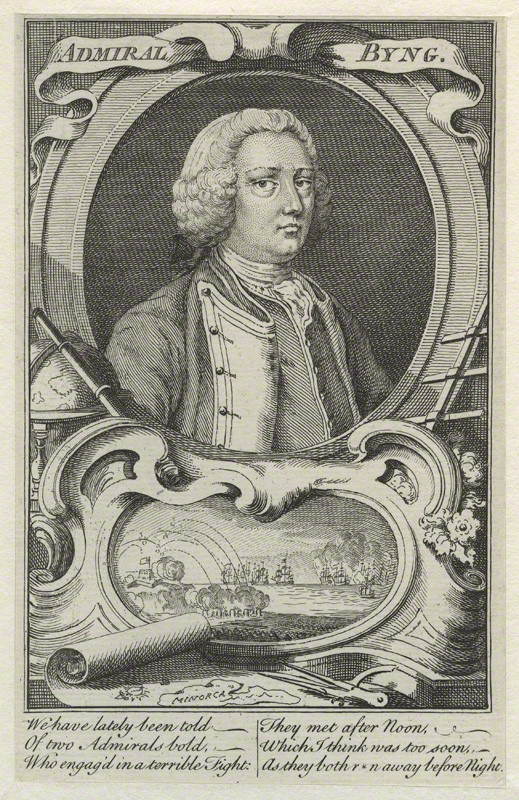
We have lately been told Of two admirals bold, Who engag'd in a terrible Fight: They met after Noon, Which I think was too soon, As they both ran away before Night.

The island of Minorca had been a British possession since 1708, when it was captured during the War of the Spanish Succession. On the approach of the Seven Years' War, numerous British diplomats based in the Mediterranean raised the alarm that Minorca was threatened by a French naval attack from Toulon. Since 1748, British downsizing of the Royal Navy meant that only three ships-of-the-line were assigned to protect trading interests in the Mediterranean by 1755. The London Evening Post had reported as far back as April 1755 that Toulon was outfitting twelve brand new "men of war". Lord George Anson, head of the Admiralty, chose to focus instead on preventing a French invasion, keeping warships close to Britain.

Byng was given orders to raise a fleet on 11 March 1756, with only six of ten assigned ships present in Portsmouth, and all of them severely undermanned. Byng's own flagship Ramillies was missing 220 crew, having loaned them to HMS Ludlow Castle prior to the fleet being formed. Byng's orders were multiplex, his first target being the alleged new French fleet at Toulon, while the British garrison of Fort St Philip at Port Mahon was a secondary concern.

Despite his protests, he was not given enough money or time to prepare the expedition properly. His fleet was delayed in Portsmouth for over a month, and he was ordered by the Admiralty Office to outfit other Channel ships ahead of his own fleet. Additionally, half of his assigned ships were in disrepair or missing. When the Defiance pulled into Portsmouth, for example, the warship was missing its fore and main topmast.

By 6 April, still short of over 800 men, Byng set sail from Portsmouth using Colonel Robert Bertie's fusiliers in place of sailors. While he was en route, the French Toulon fleet, on 17 April 1756, escorted over 1,000 tartanes and transport ships landing 15,000 troops under the command of General Richelieu at Ciutadella, on the far west end of Minorca.

Byng arrived at Gibraltar and was told of the French landing. Remarkably, General Thomas Fowke, then in command at Gibraltar, held a war council and refused to supply him with a regiment of marines, as ordered by the War Office. Further, naval facilities at Gibraltar were dilapidated.

Byng wrote a letter to the Admiralty Office, explaining the situation as dire. Many military historians have interpreted that dispatch as Byng preparing for failure and that he did not believe that the garrison could hold out against the French force. Without marines to land, and with only fusiliers to lend to the garrison (which would render his fleet once again severely undermanned), Byng nonetheless took his fleet to Minorca to assess the situation for himself.

Byng sailed on 8 May 1756. On 19 May, Byng's fleet appeared off Port Mahon, and he endeavoured to open communications with the fort. The French squadron appeared before he could open up a line of communication with any fort officer, however.

The Battle of Minorca was fought on the following day. Byng had gained the weather gage, which both forces had attempted to gain. However, the two fleets were not parallel with one another. Byng called for a lasking manoeuvre, meaning that all his ships would turn in unison and, with the wind behind them, sail straight toward the enemy bow first. But Captain Thomas Andrews of the Defiance, the lead ship due to the angled approach, did not steer directly for the first French ship in the enemy's line, but instead steered a parallel course. The Portland, Buckingham, Lancaster and Captain followed the example set by the Defiance. It took two cannon shots from Byng's flagship, the Ramillies, and some ten to fifteen minutes for the admiral to redirect the lasking. But by this time, the French admiral had ordered his ships to pull more sail and lead away from the attempted lasking. This delay cost Byng the element of surprise, and it also allowed the French to make the rest of the battle a "running fight", as Captain Augustus Hervey later called it.

Because of the angle, the leading van took the brunt of the damage. The last ship in that squadron, the Intrepid, was heavily damaged, losing three of its masts, including the main. The next three ships, the Revenge, Princess Louisa and Trident, did not pass the now listing Intrepid to keep the sanctity of the battle line. Instead, those ships nearly collided with one another, with Captain Frederick Cornwall of the Revenge eventually navigating his ship between the Intrepid and the enemy.

Byng's battle line was broken. It cost him twenty to thirty minutes to reform the line, and once the line was reformed, the French pulled full sail and expediently pulled away. Byng was told by Captain Arthur Gardiner, his flag captain, that he could set full sail for the enemy, thus providing an example to the three bottled-up ships on what to do. He declined, recalling that Admiral Thomas Mathews had been dismissed for doing so at the Battle of Toulon in 1744. After four to four and a half hours, neither side had lost a ship in the engagement, and casualties were roughly even, with 43 British sailors killed and 168 wounded, against French losses of 38 killed and 175 wounded.

Byng remained near Minorca for four days without establishing communication with the fort or sighting the French. On 24 May, he called a war council of his own where, by unanimous voting, the fleet would return to Gibraltar for repairs, succour, sailors and more marines for the garrison. The fleet arrived at Gibraltar on 19 June, where they were reinforced with four more ships of the line and a 50-gun frigate. Repairs were effected to the damaged vessels and additional water and provisions were loaded aboard. But, before his fleet could return to sea, another ship arrived from England with further instructions, relieving Byng, Fowke and several others of their command and ordering a return to home.

On arrival in England, Byng was placed in custody. The garrison resisted the Siege of Fort St Philip until 29 June, when it was forced to capitulate.

=== Fallout after Minorca ===
News of the Battle of Minorca's outcome was wanting. The Newcastle ministry had suffered military setbacks elsewhere in the British Empire; The defeat of George Washington at Fort Necessity by the French and Indians, Edward Braddock's army's losses in Pennsylvania, the siege of Fort Oswego, and the renewal of the Carnatic Wars in India, with the fall of Calcutta. Domestically, conditions were also horrid: food riots had broken out, beginning in the Midlands, spreading to Wales to the south and as far north as Glasgow. Another failure would challenge Newcastle's hold on power. Indeed, in the wake of publication of the battle, George II was flooded with petitions and addresses to investigate the government's poor handling of a whole host of issues.

When news of the Battle of Minorca did arrive, it was via a Spanish diplomat, who carried a dispatch from the French admiral, Byng's counterpart, Roland-Michel Barrin de La Galissonière. Without any word from Byng, or any other naval or army officer attached to his fleet, ministers chose to recall several officers, Byng included. It would be another 20 days before Byng's version of the battle arrived in London. By then, however, ministers had chosen a course of action detrimental to Byng.

On 26 June 1756, the government newspaper, The London Gazette, printed an edited version of Byng's report removing passages and rewording others to make the admiral appear a coward. Protest against Byng began with effigy burnings mostly in port cities throughout England and one as far away as Boston, Massachusetts.

Newcastle also received his share of odium. In a letter to Robert Craggs-Nugent, the First Minister wrote,

I have touched upon a Ticklish Point... I thought it not fair, to lay the Loss expressly upon Byng, Tho' there it will, & must be laid, & there only.

Even prior to the battle, George Bubb Dodington informed Henry Fox that ministers had already chosen a scapegoat in case events in the Mediterranean went astray. Clearly the government had chosen Byng to take the fall for their neglect of the Mediterranean theatre.

== Court-martial ==
Byng's perceived failure to relieve the garrison at Minorca caused public outrage among fellow officers and the country at large. Byng was brought home to be tried by court-martial for breach of the Articles of War which had been revised eleven years prior to mandate capital punishment for officers who did not do their utmost against the enemy, either in battle or pursuit.

The revision followed an event in 1745 during the War of the Austrian Succession, when a young lieutenant named Baker Phillips had been court-martialled and shot after his ship was captured by the French. His captain had done nothing in order to prepare the vessel for action and was killed almost immediately by a broadside. Taking command, the inexperienced junior officer had been forced to surrender the ship when she could no longer be defended. The negligent behaviour of Phillips's captain was noted by the subsequent court-martial and a recommendation for mercy was entered, but Phillips's sentence was approved by the Lords Justices of Appeal.

This sentence angered some in parliament, who felt that an officer of higher rank would have been likely to have been spared or else given a lighter punishment and that Phillips had been executed because he had been a powerless junior officer and thus a useful scapegoat. The Articles of War were amended to become one law for all: the death penalty for any officer of any rank who did not do his utmost against the enemy in battle or pursuit.

Byng's court-martial was convened on 28 December 1756 aboard the elderly 96-gun vessel HMS St George, which was anchored in Portsmouth Harbour. The presiding officer was Admiral Thomas Smith, supported by rear admirals Francis Holburne, Harry Norris and Thomas Broderick, and a panel of nine captains. The verdict was delivered four weeks later on 27 January 1757, in the form of a series of resolutions describing the course of Byng's expedition to Minorca and an interpretation of his actions.

The court acquitted Byng of personal cowardice. However, its principal findings were that Byng had failed to keep his fleet together while engaging the French; that his flagship had opened fire at too great a distance to have any effect; and that he should have proceeded to the immediate relief of Minorca rather than returning to Gibraltar. As a consequence of these actions, the court held that Byng had "not done his utmost" to engage or destroy the enemy, thereby breaching the 12th Article of War. (Note: The 12th Article of War read as follows: "Every person in the fleet who, through cowardice, negligence or disaffection, shall in time of action withdraw, or keep back, or not come to the fight or engagement, or shall not do his utmost to take or destroy every ship ... [or to] assist all and every of His Majesty's ships, or those of allies, which it shall be his duty to assist and relieve; every such person so offending and being convicted thereof by the sentence of a court-martial shall suffer death or such other punishment as the circumstances of the offence shall deserve and the court-martial shall judge fit." The final clause was struck from the Article in 1745, eleven years before Byng's trial.)

Once the court determined that Byng had "failed to do his utmost", it had no discretion over punishment under the Articles of War. In accordance with those Articles the court condemned Byng to death, but unanimously recommended that the Lords of the Admiralty ask King George II to exercise his royal prerogative of mercy.

=== Death warrant ===
It fell to Admiral John Forbes, in his role as Lord Commissioner of the Admiralty, to sign Byng's death warrant. This he refused to do, believing the sentence to be illegal, instead attaching to the warrant a document explaining his refusal. A copy of the document, believed to be Forbes' draft, on three sheets of paper, is in the archives of the Society of Genealogists. Another copy, signed "J.F. 16 February 1757", is in the Senate House Library at the University of London. It was also published as a broadside.

== Denial of clemency and execution ==
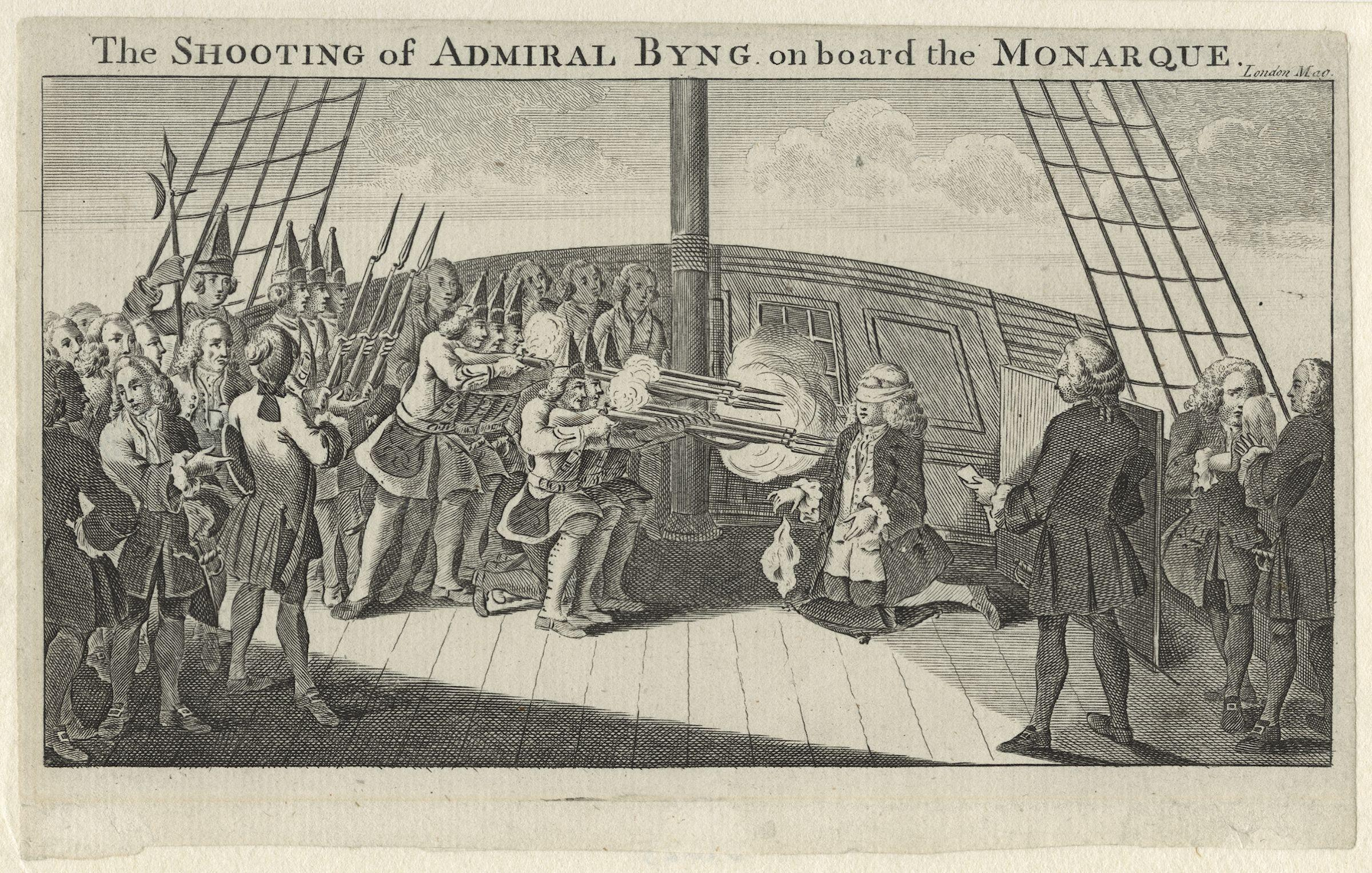
The Shooting of Admiral Byng, artist unknown

First Lord of the Admiralty Richard Grenville-Temple was granted an audience with George II, to request clemency, but this was refused in an angry exchange. Four members of the board of the court-martial petitioned Parliament, seeking to be relieved from their oath of secrecy to speak on Byng's behalf. The Commons passed a measure allowing this, but the Lords rejected the proposal.

William Pitt the Elder, Secretary of State for the Southern Department at the time, was aware that the Admiralty was at least partly to blame for the loss at Minorca due to the poor manning and repair of the fleet. The Duke of Newcastle, the politician responsible, had by now joined the Prime Minister in an uneasy political coalition and this made it difficult for Pitt to contest the court-martial's verdict as strongly as he would have liked. He did, however, petition the King to commute the death sentence. The appeal was refused; Pitt and the king were political opponents, with Pitt having pressed for George to relinquish his hereditary position of Elector of Hanover as being a conflict of interest with the government's policies in Europe.

The severity of the penalty, combined with suspicion that the Admiralty had sought to protect themselves from public anger over the defeat by throwing all the blame on the admiral, led to a reaction in favour of Byng in both the Navy and the country, which had previously demanded retribution. Pitt, then Leader of the House of Commons, told the King: "the House of Commons, Sir, is inclined to mercy", to which George responded: "You have taught me to look for the sense of my people elsewhere than in the House of Commons."

The King did not exercise his prerogative to grant clemency. Following the court-martial and pronouncement of sentence, Byng was detained aboard HMS Monarch in the Solent and, on 14 March 1757, he was taken to the quarterdeck for execution in the presence of all hands and men from other ships of the fleet in boats surrounding Monarch. The admiral knelt on a cushion and signified his readiness by dropping his handkerchief, whereupon a squad of Marines shot him dead.

== Burial and succession ==
He is buried in the Byng Mausoleum in All Saints' Church in Southill, Bedfordshire, built for the burial of his father. He died unmarried, so having left no children he bequeathed his estates, including Wrotham Park, to one of his younger nephews, George Byng (c. 1735–1789), the eldest son of his next elder brother Robert Byng (1703–1740), Governor of Barbados, who had died 17 years before the admiral's death. (His eldest surviving nephew, George Byng, 4th Viscount Torrington, had already inherited the grand paternal mansion and estate at Southill Park.) In 2018, the estate and house, largely unchanged, remained the home and property of George Byng's descendant (via a female line) Robert Michael Julian Wentworth Byng (born 1962), the grandson of Lady Elizabeth Alice Byng (1897–1987), briefly the wife of Michael Lafone, eldest daughter and co-heiress of Edmund Henry Byng, 6th Earl of Strafford (1861–1951).

== Legacy ==
Byng's execution was satirised by Voltaire in his novel Candide. In Portsmouth, the novel's protagonist Candide witnesses the execution of a British admiral by firing squad and is told that "in this country, it is good to kill an admiral from time to time to encourage the others" (Dans ce pays-ci, il est bon de tuer de temps en temps un amiral pour encourager les autres). Byng was the last of his rank to be executed in this fashion; 22 years after the event, the Articles of War were amended to allow "such other punishment as the nature and degree of the offence shall be found to deserve" as an alternative to capital punishment.

In 2007, some descendants of the Byng family petitioned the government for a posthumous pardon. The Ministry of Defence refused. Members of his family continue to seek a pardon, along with a group at Southill in Bedfordshire where the Byng family lived. Byng's execution has been called "the worst legalistic crime in the nation's annals". Some defend the policy, however; the English naval historian Nicholas A. M. Rodger believes it may have influenced the behaviour of later naval officers by helping inculcate:

a culture of aggressive determination which set British officers apart from their foreign contemporaries, and which in time gave them a steadily mounting psychological ascendancy. More and more in the course of the century, and for long afterwards, British officers encountered opponents who expected to be attacked, and more than half expected to be beaten, so that [the latter] went into action with an invisible disadvantage which no amount of personal courage or numerical strength could entirely make up for.

Such policy considerations were no comfort to the family of their victim. Warren Tute said "far from encouraging anyone at all, this judicial murder had the opposite effect". Admiral Byng was buried in the Byng vault at the Church of All Saints in Southill, Bedfordshire. His epitaph there expresses their view:

To the perpetual Disgrace
of PUBLICK JUSTICE
The Honble. JOHN BYNG Esqr
Admiral of the Blue
Fell a MARTYR to
POLITICAL PERSECUTION
March 14th in the year 1757 when
BRAVERY and LOYALTY
were Insufficient Securities
For the
Life and Honour
of a
NAVAL OFFICER

== Honorific eponyms ==
- Byng Drive, a road in Potters Bar, Hertfordshire
- The Admiral Byng, a pub in Potters Bar, Hertfordshire
- Byng, New South Wales, a locality in New South Wales, Australia
- Byng Street, one of the main streets in Orange, New South Wales, Australia
- "A Tribute to Admiral Byng", a song on the 12" Extended Play single by anarcho-punk-folk band Blyth Power, on All The Madmen Records (1986)
- Byng Street and Byng Lane, Maroubra, New South Wales, Australia
- Byng Inlet, Ontario, Canada
- Byng Island Conservation Area, Dunnville Ontario Canada

== See also ==
- Battle of Arginusae (406 BC), another case in which admirals were executed after a loss
- Great Britain in the Seven Years' War

== Bibliography ==
- Clowes, William L. (1898). The Royal Navy : A History from the Earliest Times to the Present. Vol. 2. Sampson, Low, Marston and Company. OCLC 645627800.
- Clowes, William Laird (1898). The Royal Navy: A History from the Earliest Times to the Present. Vol. 3. London: Sampson, Low, Marston and Company. OCLC 645627800.
- Krulder, Joseph J. (2021). The Execution of Admiral John Byng as a Microhistory of Eighteenth-Century Britain. London: Routledge. ISBN 978-0-367-76755-6.
- Mackay, Ruddock F. (1965). Admiral Hawke. London: Oxford University Press. OCLC 460343756.
- Robson, Martin (2016). A History of the Royal Navy: The Seven Years War. I.B. Taurus. ISBN 978-1-78076-545-7.
- Scott, Michael (2013). Scapegoats: Thirteen Victims of Military Injustice. London: Elliott and Thompson. ISBN 978-1-63220-482-0.
- Tute, Warren (1983). The True Glory, The Story of the Royal Navy Over a Thousand Years. London, UK: Macdonald & Co. ISBN 0-356-10403-6.

Political offices
| Preceded by Thomas Smith | Commodore-Governor of Newfoundland; 1742 | Succeeded by Thomas Smith |
Parliament of Great Britain
| Preceded by Chaloner Ogle; David Polhill | Member of Parliament for Rochester; 1751–1757; With: David Polhill 1751–1754; Nicholas Haddock 1754–1757 | Succeeded by Nicholas Haddock; Isaac Townsend |
