= List of lakes of Ontario: M =

This is a list of lakes of Ontario beginning with the letter M.

== Mab ==
- Mabel Lake (Kenora District)
- Mabel Lake (Algoma District)
- Mabel Pond
- Maben Lake
- Mabie Lake

== Mac–MacI ==
- Mac Lake (Cochrane District)
- Mac Lake (Rainy River District)
- Mac Lake (Timiskaming District)
- Mac Lake (Kenora District)
- MacAdam Lake
- Macamic Lake
- Macara Lake
- Macauley Lake
- MacCormack Lake
- MacCuaig Lake
- Macdonald Lake (Haliburton County)
- Macdonald Lake (Emo Township, Sudbury District)
- Macdonald Lake (Thunder Bay District)
- Macdonald Lake (Asquith Township, Sudbury District)
- MacDonald Lake (Parry Sound District)
- MacDonald Lake (Thunder Bay District)
- MacDonalds Lake
- MacDonnell Lake
- Loch Macdougall
- MacDowell Lake
- Macduff Lake
- MacDuff Lake
- Macey Lake
- Macfie Lake
- MacFie Lake
- MacGibbon Lake
- MacGillivray Lake
- MacGregor Lake
- Machan Lakes
- Machawaian Lake
- Machesney Lake
- Machine Gun Lake
- MacInnes Lake
- MacIntosh Lake

== Mack–Macv ==
- Mack Lake (Sudbury District)
- Mack Lake (Algoma District)
- Mack Lake (Nipissing District)
- Mack Lake (Rainy River District)
- Mack Lake (Kenora District)
- Mackavoy Lake
- Mackay Lake (Kenora District)
- Mackay Lake (Timiskaming District)
- MacKay Lake
- MacKeith Lake
- Mackenzie Lake (Shuniah)
- Mackenzie Lake (Flett Township, Nipissing District)
- Mackenzie Lake (Clearwater Lake, Thunder Bay District)
- Mackenzie Lake (Anglin Township, Nipissing District)
- Mackenzie Lake (Renfrew County)
- MacKenzie Lake (Cochrane District)
- MacKenzie Lake (Kenora District)
- Mackey Lake (Sudbury District)
- Mackey Lake (Algoma District)
- Mackeys Lake
- Mackie Lake (Kenora District)
- Mackie Lake (Frontenac County)
- Mackie Lake (Thunder Bay District)
- Mackie Lake (Sudbury District)
- Mackinaw Lake
- Macklin Lake
- MacLaren Lake
- Macle Lake
- MacLean Lake (Simcoe County)
- MacLean Lake (Kenora District)
- MacLeod Lake
- MacMaster Lake
- MacMillan Lake
- Maconner Lake
- Macoun Lake
- Macpherson Lake
- MacPherson Lake (Thunder Bay District)
- MacPherson Lake (Renfrew County)
- MacRae Lake
- Mac's Lake (Manitoulin District)
- Mac's Lake (Thunder Bay District)
- Macsmith Lake
- Macutagon Lake
- Macutagon Ponds
- Macvicar Lake

== Mad–Mag ==
- Madaire Lake
- Madalaine Lake
- Madawanson Lake
- Lake Madawaska
- Madawaska Lake
- Madden Lake (Lanark County)
- Madden Lake (Thunder Bay District)
- Madden Lake (Kenora District)
- Madden Lake (Timiskaming District)
- Mad Dog Lake
- Mader Lake
- Madge Lake (Delmage Township, Sudbury District)
- Madge Lake (Creelman Township, Sudbury District)
- Madill Lake
- Madoson Lake
- Madwort Lake
- Mae Lake
- Maeck Lake
- Mafeking Lake
- Mag Lake
- Mageau Lake (Timiskaming District)
- Mageau Lake (Sudbury District)
- Magee Lake (Nipissing District)
- Magee Lake (Sturgeon Lake, Thunder Bay District)
- Magee Lake (Adamson Township, Thunder Bay District)
- Maggie Lake (Sudbury District)
- Maggie Lake (Nipissing District)
- Maggie Lake (Timiskaming District)
- Maggie's Lake
- Maggotte Lake
- Magie Lake
- Magiskan Lake
- Magiss Lake
- Magnesium Lake
- Magnet Lake (Kenora District)
- Magnet Lake (Thunder Bay District)
- Magnet Lake (Algoma District)
- Magnetawan Lake
- Magnetic Lake (Thunder Bay District)
- Magnetic Lake (Rainy River District)
- Magnetite Lake
- Magneto Lake
- Magnus Lake
- Magoffin Lake
- Magog Lake
- Magone Lake (Algoma District)
- Magone Lake (Thunder Bay District)
- Magpie Lake (Kenora District)
- Magpie Lake (Nipissing District)
- Magrath Lake
- Maguire Lake

== Mah–Mak ==
- Mahagan Lake
- Mahamo Lake
- Maher Lake
- Mahkahtahkahmaekoo Sahkaheekahn/Sampson Lake
- Mahogany Lake
- Mahon Lake (Rainy River District)
- Mahon Lake (Timiskaming District)
- Mahoney Lake
- Mahree Lake
- Mahzenazing Lake
- Maiden Lake
- Maidens Lake
- Maika Lake (Kenora District)
- Maika Lake (Renfrew County)
- Maille Lake
- Mainey Lake
- Mainhood Lake
- Mainprize Lake
- Mainville Lake
- Mair Lake (Frontenac County)
- Mair Lake (Kenora District)
- Majata Lake
- Major Lake (Thunder Bay District)
- Major Lake (Sudbury District)
- Major Lake (Nipissing District)
- Majores Lake
- Makada Lake
- Makadawa Lake
- Makami Lake
- Makataiamik Lake
- Maki Lake (Thunder Bay District)
- Maki Lake (Algoma District)
- Maki Lake (Nipissing District)
- Maki Lake (Sudbury District)
- Making Ground Lake
- Makins Lake
- Makobe Lake
- Makoki Lake
- Makokibatan Lake
- Makomesut Lake
- Makonie Lake
- Makoop Lake
- Makwa Lake

== Mal ==
- Mal Lake (Algoma District)
- Mal Lake (Sudbury District)
- Malachi Lake
- Malaher Lake
- Malastikweyau Lake
- Malbeuf Lake
- Malborne Lake
- Malcolm Lake (Timiskaming District)
- Malcolm Lake (Frontenac County)
- Male Lake
- Malette Lake
- Mall Lake (Kenora District)
- Mall Lake (Cochrane District)
- Mall Lake (Algoma District)
- Mallard Lake (Hastings County)
- Mallard Lake (Timiskaming District)
- Mallard Lake (Parry Sound District)
- Mallard Lake (Cochrane District)
- Mallard Lake (Sudbury District)
- Mallard Lake (Renfrew County)
- Mallard Lake (Thunder Bay District)
- Mallard Lake (Nipissing District)
- Mallards Pond
- Mallet Lake
- Mallett Lake
- Mallic Lake
- Malloch Lake (Nipissing District)
- Malloch Lake (Cochrane District)
- Mallory Lake
- Mallot Lake
- Mallow Lake
- Malloy Lake
- Malmo Lake
- Malone Lake (Renfrew County)
- Malone Lake (Nipissing District)
- Malone Lake (Rainy River District)
- Malone Lake (Timiskaming District)
- Maloney Lake (Cochrane District)
- Maloney Lake (Timiskaming District)
- Maloney's Lake
- Malotte Lake
- Malpa Lake
- Malta Lake
- Maltese Lake
- Maluish Lake
- Malzan Lake

== Mam ==
- Mama Lake
- Mamainse Lake
- Mamakwash Lake
- Mamamia Lake
- Mameigwess (Fishbasket Lake, Kenora District)
- Mameigwess (Bradshaw Township, Kenora District)
- Mamie Lake
- Mamiegowish Lake

== Man ==
- Man Lake
- Manabezi Lake
- Manard Lake
- Manchester Lake (Thunder Bay District)
- Manchester Lake (Bruce County)
- Mandeville Lake
- Manford Lake
- Mang Lake (Algoma District)
- Mang Lake (Kenora District)
- Mangotasi Lake
- Manido Lake
- Manikoman Lake
- Manion Lake (Thunder Bay District)
- Manion Lake (Rainy River District)
- Manitoosh Lake
- Lake Manitou
- Manitou Lake (Clement Township, Nipissing District)
- Manitou Lake (Wilkes Township, Nipissing District)
- Manitounamaig Lake
- Manitouwaba Lake
- Manitouwabing Lake
- Manitouwadge Lake
- Manitowik Lake
- Manitumeig Lake
- Manitush Lake
- Mank Lake
- Mann Lake (Nipissing District)
- Mann Lake (Hastings County)
- Mann Lake (Thunder Bay District)
- Mann Lake (Parry Sound District)
- Mann Lake (Lanark County)
- Mannajigama Lake
- Mannerheim Lake
- Manning Lake
- Manomin Lake (Kenora District)
- Manomin Lake (Rainy River District)
- Mansell Lake
- Manson Lake
- Manta Lake
- Mantan Lake
- Mantario Lake
- Mantle Lake
- Manton Lake
- Mantricia Lake
- Many Branches Lake
- Lake of Many Islands
- Manzell Lake

== Map–Maq ==
- Maple Lake (Haliburton County)
- Maple Lake (Rainy River District)
- Maple Lake (Manitoulin District)
- Maple Lake (Thunder Bay District)
- Maple Lake (Algoma District)
- Maple Lake (Sudbury District)
- Maple Lake (Seguin)
- Maple Lake (Whitestone)
- Maple Lake (Oxford County)
- Maple Lake (Nipissing District)
- Maple Leaf Lake
- Mapleleaf Lake
- Maquatie Lake
- Maquon Lake

== Mar–Marg ==
- Mar Lake
- Mara Lake
- Maraboeuf Lake
- Maraboo Lake
- Maracle Lake
- Maran Lake
- Marathon Lake
- Marble Lake (Hastings County)
- Marble Lake (Frontenac County)
- Marble Lake (Thunder Bay District)
- Marble Lake (Renfrew County)
- Marceau Lake (Timiskaming District)
- Marceau Lake (Cochrane District)
- Marcelle Lake
- March Hare Lake
- March Lake (Kenora District)
- March Lake (Rainy River District)
- March Lake (Algoma District)
- Marchant Lake
- Marchington Lake
- Marcia Lake
- Marcy Lake
- Margaree Lake
- Margaret Lake (Sudbury District)
- Margaret Lake (Rainy River District)
- Margaret Lake (Muskoka District)
- Margaret Lake (Timiskaming District)
- Margaret Lake (Cochrane)
- Margaret Lake (Pearce Township, Cochrane District)
- Margaret Lake (Kenora District)
- Margaret Lake (Renfrew County)
- Margo Lake
- Margon Lake
- Margot Lake
- Margret Lake
- Margueratt Lake
- Marguerite Lake (Rainy River District)
- Marguerite Lake (Sudbury District)

== Mari–Marj ==
- Maria Lake (Thunder Bay District)
- Maria Lake (Kenora District)
- Maria Lake (Rainy River District)
- Marian Lake
- Marie Lake (Cochrane District)
- Marie Lake (Bryant Township, Thunder Bay District)
- Marie Lake (Nipissing District)
- Marie Lake (Greenstone)
- Marie Lake (Sudbury District)
- Marie Louise Lake
- Marigold Lake
- Marila Lake
- Marilyn Lake (Kenora District)
- Marilyn Lake (Renfrew County)
- Marina Lake
- Marion Lake (Ycliff Creek, Kenora District)
- Marion Lake (Muskoka District)
- Marion Lake (Alanen Township, Algoma District)
- Marion Lake (Mallard Township, Sudbury District)
- Marion Lake (Miramichi Township, Sudbury District)
- Marion Lake (Nipissing District)
- Marion Lake (Whitefish River, Kenora District)
- Marion Lake (Moncrieff Township, Sudbury District)
- Marion Lake (Rainy River District)
- Marion Lake (Timiskaming District)
- Marion Lake (McConnell Township, Sudbury District)
- Marion Lake (Plourde Township, Algoma District)
- Marion Lake (Pellatt Township, Kenora District)
- Marionette Lake
- Marisea Lake
- Marius Lake
- Marj Lake
- Marjorie Lake (Sudbury District)
- Marjorie Lake (Manitoulin District)
- Marjorie Lake (Timiskaming District)
- Marjorie Lake (Algoma District)
- Marjory Lake

== Mark–Marr ==
- Mark Lake (Kenora District)
- Mark Lake (Cochrane District)
- Mark Lake (Sudbury District)
- Mark Lake (Rainy River District)
- Markell Lake
- Markle Lake
- Markop Lake
- Marks Lake (Cochrane District)
- Marks Lake (Weikwabinonaw River, Thunder Bay District)
- Marks Lake (Marks Township, Thunder Bay District)
- Marl Lake (Simcoe County)
- Marl Lake (Sudbury District)
- Marl Lake (Frontenac County)
- Marl Lake (Bruce County)
- Marl Lake (Rainy River District)
- Marl Pond
- Marland Lake
- Marley Lake
- Marline Lake
- Marlow Lake
- Marly Lake
- Marmil Lake
- Marmion Lake
- Marmot Lake
- Marmota Lake
- Marne Lake
- Marquardt Lake
- Marquardt Pond
- Marquardts Lake
- Marquette Lake
- Marquis Lake
- Marr Lake (Bruce County)
- Marr Lake (Rainy River District)
- Marr Lake (Thunder Bay District)
- Marrin Lake
- Marron Lake

== Mars ==
- Mars Lake (Kenora District)
- Mars Lake (Cochrane District)
- Marsden Lake
- Marsh Lake (Selkirk Township, Sudbury District)
- Marsh Lake (Lac Seul, Kenora District)
- Marsh Lake (Parry Sound District)
- Marsh Lake (Elliot Lake)
- Marsh Lake (Renfrew County)
- Marsh Lake (Aguonie Township, Algoma District)
- Marsh Lake (Manitoulin District)
- Marsh Lake (Sutherland Township, Rainy River District)
- Marsh Lake (Mongowin Township, Sudbury District)
- Marsh Lake (Frontenac County)
- Marsh Lake (Cochrane District)
- Marsh Lake (Cherry River, Rainy River District)
- Marsh Lake (Margaret Lake, Kenora District)
- Marshall Lake (Nipissing District)
- Marshall Lake (Lower Manitou Lake, Kenora District)
- Marshall Lake (Lanark County)
- Marshall Lake (Timiskaming District)
- Marshall Lake (Thunder Bay District)
- Marshall Lake (Breithaupt Township, Kenora District)
- Marshall Lake (Sudbury District)
- Marshall Lake (Lennox and Addington County)
- Marshall's Lake
- Marshalok Lake
- Marshland Lake
- Marshrat Lake
- Marshy Lake (Kenora District)
- Marshy Lake (Algoma District)
- Marshy Lake (Sudbury District)
- Marshy Lake (Nipissing District)
- Marston Lake

== Mart ==
- Mart Lake (Nipissing District)
- Mart Lake (Algoma District)
- Marta Lake
- Martel Lake
- Martell Lake
- Marten Lake (Moonbeam)
- Marten Lake (Hornepayne)
- Marten Lake (Thunder Bay District)
- Marten Lake (Nipissing District)
- Marten Lake (Kenora District)
- Marten Lake (Meen Township, Algoma District)
- Marten Lake (Clifford Township, Cochrane District)
- Martencamp Lake
- Martin Lake (McEwing Township, Algoma District)
- Martin Lake (Crawford Township, Cochrane District)
- Martin Lake (Vibert Township, Algoma District)
- Martin Lake (Robertson Creek, Kenora District)
- Martin Lake (Parry Sound District)
- Martin Lake (Thunder Bay District)
- Martin Lake (Rainy River District)
- Martin Lake (Manitoulin District)
- Martin Lake (Meath Township, Algoma District)
- Martin Lake (Timiskaming District)
- Martin Lake (Haliburton County)
- Martin Lake (Muskoka District)
- Martin Lake (Mewhinney Township, Cochrane District)
- Martin Lake (Ashaweig River, Kenora District)
- Martin's Pond
- Martindale Pond
- Martineau Lake
- Martinet Lake
- Martini Lake
- Martins Lake
- Martinsen Lake
- Martinson Lake
- Martison Lake
- Marty Lake

== Maru–Mary ==
- Marugg Lake
- Marven Lake
- Mary Ann Lake (Algoma District)
- Mary Ann Lake (Timiskaming District)
- Mary Jane Lake (Thunder Bay District)
- Mary Jane Lake (Parry Sound District)
- Mary Jane Lake (Muskoka District)
- Mary Lake (Pitt Lake, Kenora District)
- Mary Lake (Rainy River District)
- Mary Lake (Muskoka District)
- Mary Lake (Algoma District)
- Mary Lake (Ben Nevis Township, Cochrane District)
- Mary Lake (Studholme Township, Cochrane District)
- Mary Lake (York Region)
- Mary Lake (Thunder Bay District)
- Mary Lake (Grey County)
- Mary Lake (Stink Lake, Kenora District)
- Mary Lake (St. John Township, Cochrane District)
- Maryann Lake
- Maryjane Lake
- Maryjo Lake
- Marylyn Lake
- Marys Lake
- Maryville Lake

== Mas ==
- Masalin Lake
- Mash Lake
- Mashagama Lake
- Mashkigomin Lake
- Mashkik Lake
- Masikesk Lake
- Masinabik Lake
- Mask Lake (Kenora District)
- Mask Lake (Algoma District)
- Maskara Lake
- Maskerine Lake
- Maskinonge Lake (Renfrew County)
- Maskinonge Lake (Sudbury District)
- Maskinonge Lake (Algoma District)
- Maskooch Lake
- Maskosi Lake
- Maskuti Lake
- Maskwa Lake
- Mason Lake (Mackenzie River, Thunder Bay District)
- Mason Lake (Sudbury District)
- Mason Lake (Amethyst Lake, Thunder Bay District)
- Mason Lake (Laurentian Hills)
- Mason Lake (Greater Madawaska)
- Mason Lake (Kenora District)
- Mason Lake (Parry Sound District)
- Masse Lake
- Massey Lake
- Massia Lake
- Masten Lake
- Master Lake
- Masterson Lake

== Mat–Mau ==
- Matachewan Lake
- Matagamasi Lake
- Mataris Lake
- Matchett Lake
- Matchinameigus Lake
- Mate Lakes
- Mathe Lake
- Mather Lake (Sudbury District)
- Mather Lake (Kenora District)
- Mather Lake (Cochrane District)
- Mather's Lake
- Mathew Lake
- Mathews Lake
- Mathieu Lakes
- Matier Lake
- Matikwan Lake
- Matilda Lake (Algoma District)
- Matilda Lake (Kenora District)
- Matinenda Lake
- Matson Lake (Rainy River District)
- Matson Lake (Northumberland County)
- Matson Lake (Thunder Bay District)
- Mattagami Lake
- Mattawa Lake
- Mattawishkwia Lake
- Matthews Lake (Algoma District)
- Matthews Lake (Muskoka District)
- Matthews Lake (Kenora District)
- Matthews Lake (Grey County)
- Matthie Lake
- Matti Lake
- Mattice Lake
- Mattin Lake
- Mattless Lake
- Mattowacka Lake
- Mattson Lake
- Maud Lake (Kenora District)
- Maud Lake (Algoma District)
- Maude Lake (Thunder Bay District)
- Maude Lake (Algoma District)
- Maun Lake
- Maund Lake
- Maunsell Lake
- Maureen Lake

== Mav–Maz ==
- Maves Lake
- Maville Lake
- Mavin Lake
- Mavis Lake (Algoma District)
- Mavis Lake (Timiskaming District)
- Mavis Lake (Kenora District)
- Maw Lake (Rainy River District)
- Maw Lake (Kenora District)
- Mawgi Lake
- Mawibuha Lake
- Mawley Lake
- Mawn Lake
- Mawson Lake
- Max Lake (Nipissing District)
- Max Lake (Thunder Bay District)
- Maxam Lake
- Maxey Lake
- Maxim Lake
- Maxon Lake
- Maxwell Lake (Kenora District)
- Maxwell Lake (Cochrane District)
- May Lake (Sioux Lookout)
- May Lake (Gould Township, Algoma District)
- May Lake (Parry Sound District)
- May Lake (Rainy River District)
- May Lake (Greater Sudbury)
- May Lake (Cochrane District)
- May Lake (Mickle Creek, Kenora District)
- May Lake (Nipissing District)
- May Lake (Sables-Spanish Rivers)
- May Lake (Gallagher Township, Sudbury District)
- May Lake (Elliot Lake)
- Mayer Lake
- Mayfair Pond
- Mayfield Lake
- Mayflower Lake
- Mayhew Lake (Rainy River District)
- Mayhew Lake (Renfrew County)
- Maynard Lake
- Mayo Lake
- Maytham Lake
- Mazinaw Lake
- Mazur Lake

== McA–McB ==
- McAdam Lake
- McAlpine Lake (Rainy River District)
- McAlpine Lake (Lindbergh Lake, Cochrane District)
- McAlpine Lake (McAlpine Township, Cochrane District)
- McAra Lake
- McAree Lake
- McArthur Lake
- McAuley Lake (Thunder Bay District)
- McAuley Lake (Sudbury District)
- McAvany Lake
- McAvay Lake
- McBain Lake (Sudbury District)
- McBain Lake (Kenora District)
- McBean Lake
- McBride Lake
- McBrien Pond

== McCa–McCl ==
- McCabe Lake
- McCabes Lake
- McCaffery Lake
- McCallum Lake (Sudbury District)
- McCallum Lake (Hastings County)
- McCallum's Pond
- McCambly Lake
- McCan Lake
- McCann Lake (Thunder Bay District)
- McCann Lake (Haliburton County)
- McCarrel Lake
- McCarrolls Lake
- McCarron Lake
- McCarston's Lake
- McCarthy Lake (Algoma District)
- McCarthy Lake (Nipissing District)
- McCarthy Lake (Perth County)
- McCartney Lake
- McCaslim Lake
- McCastle Pond
- McCaulay Lake (Rainy River District)
- McCauley Lake (Nipissing District)
- McCauley Lake (Parry Sound District)
- McCauley Lake (Kenora District)
- McCausland Lake (Frontenac County)
- McCausland Lake (Thunder Bay District)
- McCaw Lake
- McCharles Lake (Renfrew County)
- McCharles Lake (Sudbury District)
- McChesney Lake
- McCleary Lake
- McClung Lake
- McClures Lake
- McCluskey Lake
- McCluskie Lake

== McCo–McCu ==
- McColl Lake
- McCollough Lake
- McComb Lake
- McComber Lake
- McConnel Lake
- McConnell Lake (Thunder Bay District)
- McConnell Lake (Kenora District)
- McConnell Lake (Nipissing District)
- McCool Lake (Renfrew County)
- McCool Lake (Sudbury District)
- McCool Lake (Algoma District)
- McCormack Lake
- McCormick Lake (Grey County)
- McCormick Lake (Herschel Township, Hastings Highlands)
- McCormick Lake (Algoma District)
- McCormick Lake (Bangor Township, Hastings Highlands)
- McCormick Lake (Thunder Bay District)
- McCormick Lake (Sudbury District)
- McCormicks Pond
- McCoshen Lake
- McCowan Lake
- McCoy Lake (Algoma District)
- McCoy Lake (Nipissing District)
- McCoy Lake (Kenora District)
- McCoy Lake (Parry Sound District)
- McCracken Lake
- McCrae Lake (Cochrane District)
- McCrae Lake (Muskoka District)
- McCraig Lake
- McCraney Lake
- McCrea Lake (McCrea Creek, Thunder Bay District)
- McCrea Lake (Sudbury District)
- McCrea Lake (Savant River, Thunder Bay District)
- Lac McCready
- McCreary Lake
- McCreery Lake
- McCreight's Pond
- McCrimmon Lake
- McCrone's Lakes
- McCuaig Lake (Priske Township, Thunder Bay District)
- McCuaig Lake (Poshkokagan River, Thunder Bay District)
- McCubbin Lake
- McCue Lake
- McCulley Lake
- McCulloch Lake (Timiskaming District)
- McCulloch Lake (Cochrane District)
- McCullochs Mud Lake
- McCullough Lake
- McCurdy Lake
- McCurry Lake

== McD–McE ==
- McDiarmid Lake (Nipissing District)
- McDiarmid Lake (Cochrane District)
- McDonald Lake (Rowell Township, Kenora District)
- McDonald Lake (Parry Sound District)
- McDonald Lake (Haycock Township, Kenora District)
- McDonald Lake (Cochrane District)
- McDonald Lake (Nipissing District)
- McDonald Lake (Grey County)
- McDonald Lake (Lennox and Addington County)
- McDonald Lake (Haliburton County)
- McDonald Lake (Renfrew County)
- McDonald Lake (Muskoka District)
- McDonald's Lake
- McDonalds Lake
- McDonalds Pond
- McDonaldson Lake
- McDonell Lake
- McDonnel Lake
- McDonough Lake
- McDonoughs Lake
- McDott Lake
- McDouall Lake
- McDougal Lake
- McDougall Lake (Thunder Bay District)
- McDougall Lake (Sudbury District)
- McDougall Lake (Rainy River District)
- McDougall Lake (Manitoulin District)
- McDougalls Mud Lake
- McDowall Lake
- McDowell Lake
- McEachan Lake
- McEachern Lake (Cochrane District)
- McEachern Lake (Parry Sound District)
- McEachern Lake (Algoma District)
- McEdwards Lake
- McElrea Lake
- McEnaney Lake
- McEwen Lake (Rainy River District)
- McEwen Lake (Muskoka District)
- McEwen Lake (Beauparlant Township, Algoma District)
- McEwen Lake (Thunder Bay District)
- McEwen Lake (Parry Sound District)
- McEwen Lake (Esquega Township, Algoma District)
- McEwing Lake

== McF–McG ==
- McFadden Lake (Renfrew County)
- McFadden Lake (Algoma District)
- McFadden Lake (Haliburton County)
- McFall Lake
- McFarlan Lake
- McFarlands Lake
- McFarlane Lake (Nipissing District)
- McFarlane Lake (Bruce County)
- McFarlane Lake (Sudbury District)
- McFaulds Lake
- McFee Lake (Hastings County)
- McFee Lake (Nipissing District)
- McFie Lake
- McGarry Lake (Algoma District)
- McGarry Lake (Cochrane District)
- McGarvey Lake
- McGaughey Lake
- McGee Lake (Sudbury District)
- McGee Lake (Parry Sound District)
- McGee Lake (Peterborough County)
- McGees Pond
- McGhie Lake
- McGibbon Lake
- McGiffin Lake
- McGill Lake (Thunder Bay District)
- McGill Lake (Grey County)
- McGimsie Lake
- McGinnis Lake (Thunder Bay District)
- McGinnis Lake (Peterborough County)
- McGiverin Lake
- McGivney Lake
- McGlinn Lake
- McGoey Lake
- McGonegal Lake
- McGovern Lake
- McGowan Lake (Lanark County)
- McGowan Lake (Parry Sound District)
- McGowan Lake (Sudbury District)
- McGown Lake
- McGrath Lake (Thunder Bay District)
- McGrath Lake (Algoma District)
- McGraw Lake
- McGregor Lake (Kenora District)
- McGregor Lake (Thunder Bay District)
- McGrindle Lake
- McGruer Lake
- McGruther Lake
- McGuey Lake
- McGuinns Lake
- McGuire Lake (Nipissing District)
- McGuire Lake (Renfrew County)
- McGuire Lake (Frontenac County)
- McGuire Lakes

== McH–McI ==
- McHenry Lake
- McIlwroth Lake
- McInnis Lake (Nipissing District)
- McInnis Lake (Cochrane District)
- McIntosh Lake (Lanark County)
- McIntosh Lake (Timiskaming District)
- McIntosh Lake (Cochrane District)
- McIntosh Lake (Kenora District)
- McIntosh Lake (Rainy River District)
- McIntosh Lake (Nipissing District)
- McIntyre Lake (Rainy River District)
- McIntyre Lake (Kenora District)
- McIntyre Lake (Timiskaming District)
- McIntyre Lake (Nipissing District)
- McIntyre Lake (Algoma District)
- McIntyre Lake (Thunder Bay District)
- McIver Lake
- McIvor Lake (Kenora District)
- McIvor Lake (Thunder Bay District)

== McK ==
- McKaskill Lake
- McKay Lake (Cochrane District)
- McKay Lake (Ottawa)
- McKay Lake (Muskoka District)
- McKay Lake (Simpson Island)
- McKay Lake (Pic River, Thunder Bay District)
- McKechnie Lake (Algoma District)
- McKechnie Lake (Parry Sound District)
- McKee Lake (Kenora District)
- McKee Lake (Timiskaming District)
- McKee Lake (Algoma District)
- McKellar Lake (Parry Sound District)
- McKellar Lake (Thunder Bay District)
- McKellar Lake (Kenora District)
- McKelvie Lake
- McKendry Lake
- McKenna Lake (Birmingham Creek, Kenora District)
- McKenna Lake (Renfrew County)
- McKenna Lake (Attawapiskat River, Kenora District)
- McKenzie Lake (Nipissing District)
- McKenzie Lake (Cochrane District)
- McKenzie Lake (Sudbury District)
- McKenzie Lake (Rainy River District)
- McKenzie Lake (Timiskaming District)
- McKenzie Pond
- McKeown Lake (Timiskaming District)
- McKeown Lake (Sudbury District)
- McKergow Lake
- McKernan Lake
- McKessock Lake
- McKewen Lake
- McKiggan Lake
- McKinley Lake (Thunder Bay District)
- McKinley Lake (Cochrane District)
- McKinney Lake
- McKinnon Pond
- McKinstry Lake
- McKirdy Lake
- McKnight Lake (Hastings County)
- McKnight Lake (Cochrane District)
- McKnight Lake (Thunder Bay District)

== McL ==
- McLachlan Lake
- McLachlin Depot Lake
- McLachlin Lake
- McLagan Lake
- McLander Lake
- McLaren Lake (Nipissing District)
- McLaren Lake (Thunder Bay District)
- McLaren Lake (Sudbury District)
- McLaren Lake (Rainy River District)
- McLaren Lake (Lanark County)
- McLaren Lake (Timiskaming District)
- McLauchlin Lake
- McLaughlin Lake (Nipissing District)
- McLaughlin Lake (Frontenac County)
- McLaughlin Lake (Renfrew County)
- McLaughlin Lake (Kenora District)
- McLaurin Lake (Thunder Bay District)
- McLaurin Lake (Kenora District)
- McLaws Lake
- McLay Lake
- McLean Lake (Cochrane District)
- McLean Lake (North Bay)
- McLean Lake (Seguin)
- McLean Lake (Temagami)
- McLean Lake (Grey County)
- McLean Lake (East Mills Township, Parry Sound District)
- Loch McLean
- McLean Pond
- McLean's Lake
- McLeans Lake
- McLeish Lake
- McLeister Lake
- McLellan Lake
- McLennan Lake (Thunder Bay District)
- McLennan Lake (Parry Sound District)
- McLennan Lake (Halliday Township, Sudbury District)
- McLennan Lake (Chappise Township, Sudbury District)
- McLennan Lake (Kenora District)
- McLennon Lake
- McLeod Lake (Hancock Township, Sudbury District)
- McLeod Lake (Timiskaming District)
- McLeod Lake (McKee Lake, Kenora District)
- McLeod Lake (Glen Township, Thunder Bay District)
- McLeod Lake (Ellard River, Kenora District)
- McLeod Lake (Tyrone Township, Sudbury District)
- McLeod Lake (McKay Lake, Thunder Bay District)
- McLeod Lake (Algoma District)
- McLouds Lake

== McM–McN ==
- McMahon Lake (Thunder Bay District)
- McMahon Lake (Algoma District)
- McManus Lake
- McMaster Lake (Algoma District)
- McMaster Lake (Muskoka District)
- McMaster Lake (Madawaska Valley)
- McMaster Lake (Greater Madawaska)
- McMillan Lake (McMillan Township, Cochrane District)
- McMillan Lake (Black River-Matheson)
- McMinn Lake
- McMullen Lake
- McMurdo Lake
- McMurray Lake
- McMurtry Lake
- McMurty Lake
- McNab Lake (Hastings County)
- McNab Lake (Grey County)
- McNab Lake (Nipissing District)
- McNall Lake
- McNally Lake (Sudbury District)
- McNally Lake (Kenora District)
- McNamara Lake (Sudbury District)
- McNamara Lake (Kenora District)
- McNary Lake
- McNaught Lake (Sudbury District)
- McNaught Lake (Rainy River District)
- McNaughton Lake (Timiskaming District)
- McNaughton Lake (Kenora District)
- McNeely Lake
- McNeil Lake
- McNeil Lakes
- McNeil Mud Lake
- McNeils Lake
- McNevin Lake (Nipissing District)
- McNevin Lake (Kenora District)
- McNiece Lake (Rainy River District)
- McNiece Lake (Sudbury District)
- McNish Lake
- McNorton Lake
- McNulty Lake
- McNultys Lake
- McNutt Lake (Cochrane District)
- McNutt Lake (Parry Sound District)

== McO–McW ==
- McOuat Lake
- McOwen Lake
- McParlon Lake
- McPhail Lake (Donoghue Lake, Kenora District)
- McPhail Lake (Timiskaming District)
- McPhail Lake (Farrow Lake, Kenora District)
- McPhee Lake
- McPherson Lake
- McQuaby Lake
- McQuah Lake
- McQuaig Lake
- McQuaker Lake
- McQueen Lake
- McQuesten Lake
- McQuibban Lake
- McQuillan Lake
- McQuillen Lake
- McQuoid Lake
- McQuown Lake
- McRae Lake
- McRey Lake
- McReynolds Lake
- McSourley Lake
- McTaggart Lake (Parry Sound District)
- McTaggart Lake (Rainy River District)
- McTavish Lake
- McVean Lake
- McVeety Lake
- McVey Lake
- McVicar Lake
- McVittie Lake
- McWade Lake
- McWater Lake
- McWhinney Lake
- McWhirter Lake
- McWilliams Lake

== Mea–Mek ==
- Meach Lake
- Meach Lakes
- Mead Lake (Plourde Township, Algoma District)
- Mead Lake (Beaudry Township, Algoma District)
- Meadow Lake (Cochrane District)
- Meadow Lake (Parry Sound District)
- Meadow Lake (Thunder Bay District)
- Meadow Lake (Frontenac County)
- Meadow Lake (Renfrew County)
- Meadow Pond
- Meadows Lake
- Meadwell Lake
- Meandering Lake
- Meandrine Lake
- Mearow Lake
- Mears Lake
- Measor Lake
- Meat Axe Lake
- Meatbird Lake
- Meath Lake (Algoma District)
- Meath Lake (Renfrew County)
- Mecheegune Lake
- Mechita Lake
- Meda Lake
- Lake Medad
- Medallion Lake
- Medcalf Lake (Algoma District)
- Medcalf Lake (Thunder Bay District)
- Meddick Lake
- Medhurst Lake
- Medicine Lake (Algoma District)
- Medicine Lake (Tustin Township, Kenora District)
- Medicine Lake (Haycock Township, Kenora District)
- Medicine Stone Lake
- Medora Lake
- Medwick Lake
- Meekin Lake
- Meen Lake
- Meenach Lake
- Meers Lake
- Meeteekooneekahmeeng/Dolphin Lake
- Meeting Lake
- Mefrau Lake
- Meg Lake
- Meggisi Lake
- Megisan Lake
- Megit Lake
- Mego Lake
- Meilleur Lake
- Meitz Lake
- Mekenak Lake

== Mel–Mep ==
- Mel Lake
- Melady Lake
- Melanson Lake
- Melborne Lake
- Melchett Lake
- Melema Lake
- Melgund Lake (Kenora District)
- Melgund Lake (Thunder Bay District)
- Melia Lake
- Melick Lake
- Melin Lake
- Mellish Lake
- Mellon Lake (Lennox and Addington County)
- Mellon Lake (Algoma District)
- Melly Lake
- Melnyk Lake
- Melody Lake
- Melrose Lake
- Melville Lake
- Melville Pond
- Melvin Lake
- Memesagamesing Lake
- Memoir Lake
- Menaeko Lake
- Menako Lakes
- Lac Menard
- Menard Lake
- Mendelssohn Lake
- Menet Lake
- Meniss Lake
- Mennin Lake
- Menominee Lake
- Menona Lake
- Mensour Lake
- Menzie Lake (Lessard Township, Algoma District)
- Menzie Lake (Sudbury District)
- Menzie Lake (Greenwood Township, Algoma District)
- Menzies Pond
- Mephisto Lake
- Mephitis Lake

== Mer–Mes ==
- Mercer Lake (Algoma District)
- Mercer Lake (Nipissing District)
- Merchands Lake
- Merchant Lake
- Mercutio Lake
- Merdie Lake
- Mere Lake
- Merekeme Lake
- Merganser Lake (Nipissing District)
- Merganser Lake (Cochrane District)
- Meridian Lake (Ladysmith Township, Kenora District)
- Meridian Lake (Barrel Lake, Kenora District)
- Merkley Lake (Esnagami River, Thunder Bay District)
- Merkley Lake (Dubroy Lake, Thunder Bay District)
- Merl Lake
- Mermaid Lake (Kenora District)
- Mermaid Lake (Nipissing District)
- Merpaw Lake
- Merrill Lake (Lennox and Addington County)
- Merrill Lake (Kenora District)
- Merritt Lake
- Merson Lake
- Mervyn Lake
- Meskwatessi Lake
- Mesomikenda Lake
- Messada Lake
- Messy Lake
- Meston Lake
- Mestowana Lake

== Met–Mez ==
- Meta Lake
- Metacryst Lake
- Metcalfe Lake
- Meteor Lake
- Metevier Lake
- Methuen Lake
- Metig Lake (Sudbury District)
- Metig Lake (Thunder Bay District)
- Metikemedo Lake
- Metionga Lake
- Metivier Lake (Algoma District)
- Metivier Lake (Thunder Bay District)
- Mettawi Lake
- Metzger Pond
- Mew Lake
- Mewburn Lake
- Mews Lake
- Mexican Hat Lake
- Meyer Lake
- Meyers Lake
- Mezhisk Lake

== Mic ==
- Mica Lake
- Mice Lake
- Michabo Lake
- Michaelis Lake
- Michaels Lake
- Michal Lake
- Michaud Lake (Kenora District)
- Michaud Lake (Sudbury District)
- Michel Lake (Cochrane District)
- Michel Lake (Kenora District)
- Michell Lake (Sturgeon Lake, Thunder Bay District)
- Michell Lake (Fuchsite Lake, Thunder Bay District)
- Michi Lake
- Michie Lake
- Michigan Lakes
- Michikamog Lake
- Michikan Lake
- Michikenis Lake
- Michikenopik Lake
- Michiwakenda Lake
- Mick Lake (Sudbury District)
- Mick Lake (Renfrew County)
- Mickey Lake (Sudbury District)
- Mickey Lake (Renfrew County)
- Mickle Lake

== Mid–Mik ==
- Lac de Midas
- Midcross Lake
- Middle Fox Lake
- Middle Lake (Kenora District)
- Middle Lake (Sudbury District)
- Middle Lake (Algoma District)
- Middle Lake (Stormont, Dundas and Glengarry United Counties)
- Middle Long Lake
- Middle Muldrew Lake
- Middle Pancake Lake
- Middle Pond
- Middle Roland Lake
- Middle Shanty Bay Lake
- Middle Shanty Lake
- Middle Shebandowan Lake
- Middle Stetham Lake
- Middle Wildcat Lake
- Middleton Lake (Algoma District)
- Middleton Lake (Timiskaming District)
- Midge Lake
- Midget Lake (Timiskaming District)
- Midget Lake (Nipissing District)
- Midlothian Lake
- Midportage Lake
- Midway Lake (Kenora District)
- Midway Lake (Sudbury District)
- Mieske Lake
- Migisi Lake
- Mignet Lake
- Mihell Lake
- Mij Lake
- Mijinemungshing Lake
- Mikado Lake
- Mikano Lake
- Mike Lake (Sudbury District)
- Mike Lake (Kenora District)
- Mike's Lake
- Mikel Lake
- Miki Lake
- Mikinak Lake
- Mikomebil Lake
- Mikwam Lake
- Mikwawukaw Lake

== Mila–Milk ==
- Milanese's Lakes
- Milbean Lake
- Mildred Lake (Mildred Township, Algoma District)
- Mildred Lake (Haliburton County)
- Mildred Lake (Wawa)
- Mile Board Lake
- Mile Lake (Renfrew County)
- Mile Lake (Del Villano Township, Algoma District)
- Mile Lake (Kenora District)
- Mile Lake (Timiskaming District)
- Mile Lake (Redsky Township, Algoma District)
- Miles Lake (Cochrane District)
- Miles Lake (Sudbury District)
- Miles Lake (Kenora District)
- Milfair Lake
- Lac du Milieu
- Military Lake
- Milk Lake (Rainy River District)
- Milk Lake (Frontenac County)
- Milks Lake
- Milkshake Lake
- Milk-vetch Lake
- Milky Lake

== Mill ==
- Mill Lake (Head, Clara and Maria)
- Mill Lake (Algoma District)
- Mill Lake (Parry Sound District)
- Mill Lake (Laurentian Hills)
- Mill Lake (Manitoulin District)
- Mill Pond (Oxford County)
- Mill Pond (Stormont, Dundas and Glengarry United Counties)
- Mill Pond (Halton Region)
- Mill Pond (Hastings County)
- Mill Pond (Kenora District)
- Mill Pond (Waterloo Region)
- Mill Pond (Durham Region)
- Mill Pond (Leeds and Grenville United Counties)
- Mill Pond (Frontenac County)
- Mill Pond (Prince Edward County)
- Mill Pond (Middlesex County)
- Mill Pond (Grey County)
- Lac des Mille Lacs
- Millen Lake
- Miller Lake (Miller Creek, Kenora District)
- Miller Lake (Frontenac County)
- Miller Lake (Renfrew County)
- Miller Lake (Bruce County)
- Miller Lake (Nipissing District)
- Miller Lake (Parry Sound District)
- Miller Lake (Maund Township, Cochrane District)
- Miller Lake (Algoma District)
- Miller Lake (Bayly Township, Timiskaming District)
- Miller Lake (Thunder Bay District)
- Miller Lake (Irwin Creek, Kenora District)
- Miller Lake (Nicol Township, Timiskaming District)
- Miller Lake (Timmins)
- Millercamp Lake
- Millerd Lake
- Millers Lake (Renfrew County)
- Millers Lake (Frontenac County)
- Millers Lake (Waterloo Region)
- Millichamp Lake
- Millie Lake
- Milligan Lake
- Millman Lake
- Mills Lake (Lanark County)
- Mills Lake (Kenora District)
- Mills Lake (Rupert Township, Thunder Bay District)
- Mills Lake (Sudbury District)
- Mills Lake (Algoma District)
- Mills Lake (Grenville Township, Thunder Bay District)
- Millward Lake
- Milly Lake

== Miln–Milt ==
- Milne Lake (Stinger Lake, Thunder Bay District)
- Milne Lake (Cochrane District)
- Milne Lake (Making Ground River, Thunder Bay District)
- Milne Lake (Nipissing District)
- Milner Lake (Kenora District)
- Milner Lake (Timiskaming District)
- Milogamau Lake
- Milon Lake
- Milotte Lake
- Milt Lake
- Milton Lake (Parry Sound District)
- Milton Lake (Thunder Bay District)
- Milton Lake (Sudbury District)
- Milty Lake

== Mim ==
- Mima Lake
- Mimi Lake
- Miminiska Lake

== Min–Minj ==
- Min Lake
- Minataree Lake
- Minchin Lake
- Mindedo Lake
- Mindemoya Lake
- Minden Lake
- Mine Lake (Cochrane District)
- Mine Lake (Nicolet Township, Algoma District)
- Mine Lake (Deroche Township, Algoma District)
- Miner Lake (Frontenac County)
- Miner Lake (Parry Sound District)
- Miner Lake (Dorion)
- Miner Lake (Pifher Township, Thunder Bay District)
- Mineral Lake
- Miners Lake (Nipissing District)
- Miners Lake (Thunder Bay District)
- Miners Lake (Rainy River District)
- Mining Corporation Lake
- Mining Lake
- Minisinakwa Lake
- Miniss Lake
- Ministic Lake
- Ministik Lake (Seal River, Cochrane District)
- Ministik Lake (Ministik Creek, Cochrane District)
- Ministiko Lake
- Miniwaski Lake
- Minjekawon Lake

== Mink ==
- Mink Lake (Lake of Bays)
- Mink Lake (Abaraham Township, Algoma District)
- Mink Lake (Hinchinbrooke Township, Central Frontenac)
- Mink Lake (East Ferris)
- Mink Lake (Cunningham Township, Sudbury District)
- Mink Lake (Pentland Township, Nipissing District)
- Mink Lake (Hotte Township, Algoma District)
- Mink Lake (Spanish)
- Mink Lake (South Frontenac)
- Mink Lake (South Algonquin)
- Mink Lake (Fisher Lake, Rainy River District)
- Mink Lake (Carter Lake, Kenora District)
- Mink Lake (Elliot Lake)
- Mink Lake (Killarney)
- Mink Lake (Renfrew County)
- Mink Lake (Pickerel River, Rainy River District)
- Mink Lake (Wawa)
- Mink Lake (Bracebridge)
- Mink Lake (Olden Township, Central Frontenac)
- Mink Lake (McEwing Township, Algoma District)
- Mink Lake (Mink Creek, Kenora District)
- Minkaduza Lake
- Minkes Lake
- Minkey Lake
- Minko Lake
- Minkspaw Lake
- Minktail Lake
- Minktrack Lake

== Minn–Minu ==
- Minn Lake
- Minnaweiskag Lake
- Minnehaha Lake (Nipissing District)
- Minnehaha Lake (Kenora District)
- Minnesabik Lake
- Minnesota Lake
- Minnett Lake
- Minnewawa Lake
- Minnicock Lake
- Minnie Lake
- Minnipuka Lake
- Minnitaki Lake
- Minnow Lake (Eisenhower Township, Sudbury District)
- Minnow Lake (Red Lake)
- Minnow Lake (Finlayson Township, Nipissing District)
- Minnow Lake (Lac Seul, Kenora District)
- Minnow Lake (Roberts Township, Sudbury District)
- Minnow Lake (Parry Sound District)
- Minnow Lake (Demorest Township, Sudbury District)
- Minnow Lake (Rainy River District)
- Minnow Lake (Frontenac County)
- Minnow Lake (Norman Township, Greater Sudbury)
- Minnow Lake (McKim Township, Greater Sudbury)
- Minnow Lake (Hawkins Township, Algoma District)
- Minnow Lake (Cochrane District)
- Minnow Lake (Renfrew County)
- Minnow Lake (Raimbault Township, Algoma District)
- Minnow Lake (Gladman Township, Nipissing District)
- Minnow Lake (South Algonquin)
- Minnow Lake (Peterborough County)
- Minnow Lake (Kashabowie Lake, Thunder Bay District)
- Minnow Lake (Strey Township, Thunder Bay District)
- Minnow Pond
- Minnowtrap Lake
- Mino Lake
- Minominatik Lake
- Minor Lake
- Minson Lake
- Mint Lake
- Minto Lake (Algoma District)
- Minto Lake (Nipissing District)
- Minute Lake

== Mir ==
- Mirage Lake (Thunder Bay District)
- Mirage Lake (Parry Sound District)
- Miramichi Lake
- Miranda Lake
- Mire Lake (Timiskaming District)
- Mire Lake (Nipissing District)
- Miriam Lake (Algoma District)
- Miriam Lake (Timiskaming District)
- Miriam Lake (Thunder Bay District)
- Mirimoki Lake
- Miron Lake (Algoma District)
- Miron Lake (Thunder Bay District)
- Mirror Lake (Shuniah)
- Mirror Lake (Haliburton County)
- Mirror Lake (Algoma District)
- Mirror Lake (Little Morraine Lake, Thunder Bay District)
- Mirror Lake (Kenora District)
- Mirror Lake (Timiskaming District)
- Mirror Lake (Muskoka District)
- Mirror Lake (Seguin)
- Mirror Lake (Carling)
- Miry Lake

== Mis ==
- Misamikwash Lake
- Misema Lake
- Miserable Lake (Thunder Bay District)
- Miserable Lake (Haliburton County)
- Misery Lake
- Misfit Lake
- Mishap Lake (Renfrew County)
- Mishap Lake (Sudbury District)
- Mishewawa Lake
- Mishi Lake
- Mishibishu Lake
- Mishimagwa Lake
- Mishionga Lake
- Misikeyask Lake
- Misiwaweya Lake
- Miska Lake
- Miskeesik Lake
- Miskodee Lake
- Miskokway Lake
- Miskwabi Lake
- Miskwamabi Lake
- Mison Lake
- Misquamaebin Lake
- Missery Lake
- Missibay Lake
- Missinaibi Lake
- Missing Lake (Jacques Township, Thunder Bay District)
- Missing Lake (Floating Heart River, Thunder Bay District)
- Mission Lake
- Missisa Lake
- Mississagagon Lake
- Mississagi Lake
- Mississagua Lake
- Mississippi Lake
- Missus Lake
- Mist Lake (Timiskaming District)
- Mist Lake (Kenora District)
- Mistahayo Lake
- Mistake Lake
- Mistaken Lake
- Mistango Lake
- Mistassin Lake
- Mistassini Lake
- Mistawak Lake
- Mister Lake
- Mistinikon Lake
- Mistry Lake
- Misty Lake (Sewell Township, Sudbury District)
- Misty Lake (Moffat Township, Sudbury District)
- Misty Lake (Nipissing District)

== Mit–Miz ==
- Mit Lake
- Mitchele Lake
- Mitchell Lake (Timiskaming District)
- Mitchell Lake (Algoma District)
- Mitchell Lake (Upper Manitou Lake, Kenora District)
- Mitchell Lake (Nipissing District)
- Mitchell Lake (Hastings County)
- Mitchell Lake (Jackman Township, Kenora District)
- Mitchell Lake (Thunder Bay District)
- Mitchell Lake (Frontenac County)
- Mitchell Lake (Kawartha Lakes)
- Mitigonaganing Lake
- Mitre Lake
- Mitt Lake (Cochrane District)
- Mitt Lake (Timiskaming District)
- Mitt Lake (Rainy River District)
- Mitta Lake
- Mittay Lake
- Mitten Lake (Kenora District)
- Mitten Lake (Lennox and Addington County)
- Mix Lake
- Mizzy Lake

== Moa–Mom ==
- Moar Lake
- Mobbs Lake
- Moberley Lake (Terrace Bay)
- Moberley Lake (GTP Block 6 Township, Thunder Bay District)
- Moberly Lake
- Mobout Lake
- Mocassin Lake
- Moccasin Lake (Algoma District)
- Moccasin Lake (Timiskaming County)
- Moccasin Lake (Renfrew County)
- Moccasin Lake (Nipissing District)
- Mocking Lake
- Modden Lake
- Modder Lake
- Modo Lake
- Modred Lake
- Moffat Lake (Timiskaming District)
- Moffat Lake (Renfrew County)
- Moffat Lake (Parry Sound District)
- Moffat Lakes
- Moffat Pond
- Moger Pond
- Mogridge Lake
- Mohan Lake
- Mohawk Lake (Nipissing District)
- Mohawk Lake (Brant County)
- Moher Lake (Kenora District)
- Moher Lake (Sudbury District)
- Moir Lake
- Moira Lake
- Mojikit Lake
- Moki Lake
- Mold Lake
- Mole Lake (McEwing Township, Algoma District)
- Mole Lake (Nipissing District)
- Mole Lake (Galbraith Township, Algoma District)
- Molinski Lake
- Mollet Lake
- Mollie Lake
- Mollison Lake
- Molly Lake
- Molson Lake
- Molybdenite Lake
- Molzan Lake
- Mom Lake

== Mon ==
- Mona Lake (Algoma District)
- Mona Lake (Thunder Bay District)
- Monaco Lake
- Monaghan Lake
- Monahan Lake
- Monarch Lake
- Monck Lake
- Moncrieff Lake
- Mond Lake (Sudbury District)
- Mond Lake (Greater Sudbury)
- Monday Lake (Thunder Bay District)
- Monday Lake (Sudbury District)
- Monet Lake
- Monetoues Lake
- Mong Lake (Rainy River District)
- Mong Lake (Sudbury District)
- Mongoose Lake (Walls Township, Algoma District)
- Mongoose Lake (Vibert Township, Algoma District)
- Mongus Lake
- Monk Lake (Sudbury District)
- Monk Lake (Greater Sudbury)
- Monkeywrench Lake
- Monkshood Lake
- Monmonawson Lake
- Monmouth Lake
- Monocle Lake
- Monrock Lake
- Mons Lake
- Monster Lake
- Montcrief Lake
- Monte Lake
- Lake Montgomery
- Montgomery Lake (Sudbury District)
- Montgomery Lake (Renfrew County)
- Montgomery Lake (Cochrane District)
- Montgomery Lake (Rainy River District)
- Montgomery Lake (Muskoka District)
- Montgomerys Lake
- Montreal Lake
- Montreuil Lake (Cochrane District)
- Montreuil Lake (Nipissing District)
- Montrose Lake
- Montserrat Lake
- Monty Lake
- Monument Lake
- Monypenny Lake

== Mood–Moor ==
- Lake Moodie
- Moodie Lake
- Moon Lake (GTP Block 6 Township, Thunder Bay District)
- Moon Lake (Syine Township, Thunder Bay District)
- Moon Lake (Cockeram Township, Thunder Bay District)
- Moon Lake (Sudbury District)
- Moon Lake (Cochrane District)
- Moon Lake (Temagami)
- Moon Lake (White Township, Nipissing District)
- Moon Lake (Wawa)
- Moon Lake (Neebing)
- Moon Lake (Viel Township, Algoma District)
- Moon Lake (Timiskaming District)
- Moon Lake (Garden River 14)
- Moon Lake (Kenora District)
- Moon Lake (Monestime Township, Algoma District)
- Moon Lake (Greater Sudbury)
- Moonbeam Lake (Cochrane District)
- Moonbeam Lake (Nipissing District)
- Mooney Lake (Haliburton County)
- Mooney Lake (Rainy River District)
- Mooney Lake (Kenora District)
- Moonlight Lake
- Moonshine Lake (Algoma District)
- Moonshine Lake (Sudbury District)
- Moonshine Lake (Rainy River District)
- Moonshine Lake (Stirling Township, Thunder Bay District)
- Moonshine Lake (Big River, Thunder Bay District)
- Moonyear Lake
- Moor Lake
- Moore Lake (Frontenac County)
- Moore Lake (Yeo Township, Sudbury District)
- Moore Lake (Cochrane District)
- Moore Lake (Minden Hills)
- Moore Lake (Bruce County)
- Moore Lake (Oswald Township, Sudbury District)
- Moore Lake (Calvin)
- Moore Lake (Dysart et al)
- Moore Lake (Lennox and Addington County)
- Moore Lake (South Algonquin)
- Moore Lake (Greater Sudbury)
- Moore Lake (Thunder Bay District)
- Moore Lake (Peterborough County)
- Moore Pond
- Moore's Lake
- Moorecamp Lake
- Mooreland Lake
- Mooreson Lake
- Moorhouse Lake

== Moose ==
- Moose Lake (Atikokan)
- Moose Lake (Redditt Township, Kenora District)
- Moose Lake (Laurier Township, Parry Sound District)
- Moose Lake (Sables-Spanish Rivers)
- Moose Lake (Timiskaming District)
- Moose Lake (Dorion)
- Moose Lake (Rain River, Kenora District)
- Moose Lake (Sayer Township, Algoma District)
- Moose Lake (Bomby Township, Thunder Bay District)
- Moose Lake (Bevin Township, Sudbury District)
- Moose Lake (Ermine Township, Algoma District)
- Moose Lake (Winnipeg River, Kenora District)
- Moose Lake (Laronde Township, Algoma District)
- Moose Lake (Vista Lake, Rainy River District)
- Moose Lake (Muskoka District)
- Moose Lake (Nagagami Township, Algoma District)
- Moose Lake (Moose Creek, Kenora District)
- Moose Lake (Ivanhoe Township, Sudbury District)
- Moose Lake (Wallbridge Township, Parry Sound District)
- Moose Lake (Nipissing District)
- Moose Lake (Cochrane District)
- Moose Lake (Haliburton County)
- Moose Lake (Robbins Township, Thunder Bay District)
- Moose Lake (The Archipelago)
- Moose Lake (Mameigwess River, Kenora District)
- Moose Lake (Killarney)
- Moose Lake (Hall Township, Sudbury District)
- Moose Lake (Dart Lake, Thunder Bay District)
- Moose Lake (Norman Township, Greater Sudbury)
- Moose Lake (Capreol Township, Greater Sudbury)
- Moose Lake (Levack Township, Greater Sudbury)
- Moose Lake (Renfrew County)
- Moose Lake (Scattergood Creek, Kenora District)
- Moose Lake (Ord River, Kenora District)
- Moose Lake (MacLennan Township, Greater Sudbury)
- Moose Lake (Shuniah)
- Moose Pond

== Moose B–Moosev ==
- Moose Bay Lake
- Moosecall Lake
- Moosegrass Lake
- Moosegrove Lake
- Moosehaunt Lake
- Moosehead Lake (Hartle Township, Nipissing District)
- Moosehead Lake (Timiskaming District)
- Moosehead Lake (Temagami)
- Mooseheart Lake
- Moosehorn Lake (Rainy River District)
- Moosehorn Lake (Algoma District)
- Moosehorn Lake (Thunder Bay District)
- Mooseland Lake
- Moosemuck Lake
- Mooseridge Lake
- Mooserun Lake
- Mooseskull Lake
- Moosetegon Lake
- Moosetrack Lake (Haliburton County)
- Moosetrack Lake (Rainy River District)
- Mooseview Lake

== Mooso–Moot ==
- Moosolf Lake
- Moosonee Lake
- Moot Lake

== Mor ==
- Morah Lake
- Moraine Lake
- Moran Lake (Algoma District)
- Moran Lake (Renfrew County)
- Moran Lake (Thunder Bay District)
- Moray Lake (Zavitz Township, Sudbury District)
- Moray Lake (Nipissing District)
- Moray Lake (Green Township, Sudbury District)
- Morden Lake (Thunder Bay District)
- Morden Lake (Sudbury District)
- Moreau Lake
- Moreland Lake (Hastings County)
- Moreland Lake (Algoma District)
- Morelly Lake
- Morey Lake
- Morgan Lake (Kenora District)
- Morgan Lake (Gzowski Township, Thunder Bay District)
- Morgan Lake (Sudbury District)
- Morgan Lake (Frontenac County)
- Morgan Lake (Camel Read Lake, Thunder Bay District)
- Morgan's Lake
- Morham Lake
- Morin Lake (Roberts Township, Sudbury District)
- Morin Lake (Addison Township, Sudbury District)
- Morin Lake (Renfrew County)
- Morin Lake (Thunder Bay District)
- Morin Lake (Timiskaming District)
- Morison Lake
- Morley Lake
- Morn Lake
- Morrill Lake
- Morris Lake (Cochrane District)
- Morris Lake (Lumby Lake, Kenora District)
- Morris Lake (Sudbury District)
- Morris Lake (Morris River, Kenora District)
- Morrisette Lake
- Morrison Lake (Muskoka District)
- Morrison Lake (Timiskaming District)
- Morrison Lake (Nahwegezhic Township, Algoma District)
- Morrison Lake (Huron County)
- Morrison Lake (Aguonie Township, Algoma District)
- Morrow Lake
- Morse Lake
- Mortar Lake
- Mortimer Lake
- Mortley Lake
- Morton Lake (Timiskaming District)
- Morton Lake (Sudbury District)

== Mos–Mot ==
- Mosambik Lake
- Mose Lake
- Moseau Lake
- Moseley Lake
- Moses Lake (Rainy River District)
- Moses Lake (Timiskaming District)
- Moses Lake (Sudbury District)
- Mosher Lake (Greenstone)
- Mosher Lake (Timiskaming District)
- Mosher Lake (Seine River, Thunder Bay District)
- Moshikopaw Lake
- Moshkinabi Lake
- Mosie Lake (Renfrew County)
- Mosie Lake (Kenora District)
- Mosier Lake
- Mosque Lake
- Mosquito Lake (Frontenac County)
- Mosquito Lake (Nipissing District)
- Mosquito Lake (Leeds and Grenville United Counties)
- Mosquito Lake (Muskoka District)
- Mosquito Lake (Greater Sudbury)
- Mosquito Lake (Thunder Bay District)
- Mosquito Lake (Cascaden Township, Sudbury District)
- Mosquito Lake (Caverley Township, Sudbury District)
- Mosquito Lake (Algoma District)
- Moss Lake (Moss Township, Thunder Bay District)
- Moss Lake (Norm Lake, Kenora District)
- Moss Lake (Nipissing District)
- Moss Lake (Grey County)
- Moss Lake (North Washagami River, Kenora District)
- Moss Lake (Nipigon Bay, Thunder Bay District)
- Moss Lake (Timiskaming District)
- Moss Lake (Aweres Township, Algoma District)
- Moss Lake (Bourinot Township, Algoma District)
- Moss Lake (Forgie Township, Kenora District)
- Mossberry Lake (Kenora District)
- Mossberry Lake (Renfrew County)
- Mossy Lake
- Moth Lake (Kenora District)
- Moth Lake (Muskoka District)
- Motherwell Lake
- Motley Lake
- Mott Lake
- Mottle Lake
- Motz Lake

== Moul ==
- Mould Lake
- Moule Lake (Algoma District)
- Moule Lake (Thunder Bay District)
- Moulton Lake (Frontenac County)
- Moulton Lake (Parry Sound District)

== Moun ==
- Mound Lake
- Mount Lake (Rainy River District)
- Mount Lake (Kenora District)
- Mount Lake (Thunder Bay District)
- Mount Lake (Algoma District)
- Lake on the Mount
- Mountain Lake (Monmouth Township, Highlands East)
- Mountain Lake (South Algonquin)
- Mountain Lake (Parry Sound District)
- Mountain Lake (Meaford)
- Mountain Lake (Butler Township, Nipissing District)
- Mountain Lake (Vale Creek, Thunder Bay District)
- Mountain Lake (North Frontenac)
- Mountain Lake (Timiskaming District)
- Mountain Lake (Simcoe County)
- Mountain Lake (Lascelles Township, Algoma District)
- Mountain Lake (South Frontenac)
- Mountain Lake (Georgian Bluffs)
- Mountain Lake (Finan Township, Algoma District)
- Mountain Lake (Cardiff Township, Highlands East)
- Mountain Lake (Hastings County)
- Mountain Lake (Temagami)
- Mountain Lake (Chatsworth)
- Mountain Lake (Nameigos Township, Algoma District)
- Mountain Lake (Shuniah)
- Mountain Lake (Bog Creek, Kenora District)
- Mountain Lake (Renfrew County)
- Mountain Lake (Peterborough County)
- Mountain Lake (Rubanoe Lake, Kenora District)
- Mountain Lake (Wawa)
- Mountain Lake (Preston Township, Nipissing District)
- Mountain Lake (Minden Hills)
- Mountain Lake (Sudbury District)
- Mountain Lake (Minnesota–Ontario)
- Lake on the Mountain (Haliburton County)
- Lake on the Mountain (Prince Edward County)
- Mountain Ash Lake
- Mountain Basin
- Mountain Island Lake
- Lake of the Mountains
- Mountain Top Lake
- Mountaintop Lake
- Mountairy Lake
- Mount Baldy Lake
- Mountbatten Lake
- Mountdew Lake
- Mountjoy Lake
- Mountney Lake
- Mountsberg Reservoir
- Mount Sinclair Lake

== Mous–Mout ==
- Mouse Lake (Lennox and Addington County)
- Mouse Lake (Rainy River District)
- Mouse Lake (Nipissing District)
- Mouse Lake (Sudbury District)
- Mouse Lake (Haliburton County)
- Mouse Lake (Parry Sound District)
- Mousetrap Lake
- Mousseau Lake (Frontenac County)
- Mousseau Lake (Sudbury District)
- Mousseau Lake (Timiskaming District)
- Mousseau Lake (Renfrew County)
- Mousseau Lake (Kenora District)
- Mouton Lake

== Mow–Moz ==
- Mowat Lake (Timiskaming District)
- Mowat Lake (Sudbury District)
- Mowat Lake (Nipissing District)
- Mowbray Lake
- Mowe Lake
- Mowry Lake
- Moxam Lake
- Moxley Lake
- Moxness Lake
- Moyer Lake
- Moyle Lake
- Moyneur Lake
- Moza Lake
- Mozhabong Lake

== Mub–Muc ==
- Mubwayaka Lake
- Much Lake
- Muchmore Lake
- Muck Lake

== Mud (Algoma–Kenora) ==
Algoma District

- Mud Lake (Sagard Township, Algoma District)
- Mud Lake (Finan Township, Algoma District)
- Mud Lake (Barager Township, Algoma District)
- Mud Lake (Varley Township, Algoma District)
- Mud Lake (White River)

Bruce County

- Mud Lake (Bruce County)

Cochrane District

- Mud Lake (Colquhoun Township, Cochrane District)
- Mud Lake (Timmins)

Dufferin County

- Mud Lake (Dufferin County)

Durham Region

- Mud Lake (Durham Region)

Frontenac County

- Mud Lake (South Frontenac)
- Mud Lake (North Frontenac)

Greater Sudbury

- Mud Lake (Telfer Township, Greater Sudbury)
- Mud Lake (Waters Township, Greater Sudbury)
- Mud Lake (Norman Township, Greater Sudbury)
- Mud Lake (Snider Township, Greater Sudbury)
- Mud Lake (Fairbank Township, Greater Sudbury)

Grey County

- Mud Lake (Georgian Bluffs)
- Mud Lake (Chatsworth)
- Mud Lake (Grey Highlands)

Hastings County

- Mud Lake (Hastings County)

Huron County

- Mud Lake (Huron County)

Kenora District

- Mud Lake (MacNicol Township, Kenora District)
- Mud Lake (Selby Lake, Kenora District)
- Mud Lake (Sioux Lookout)
- Mud Lake (Hook Lake, Kenora District)

== Mud (Lanark–Parry Sound) ==
Lanark County

- Mud Lake (Lanark County)

Leeds and Grenville United Counties

- Mud Lake (Lansdowne Township, Leeds and the Thousand Islands)
- Mud Lake (Escott Township, Leeds and the Thousand Islands)
- Mud Lake (Elizabethtown-Kitley)
- Mud Lake (Athens)
- Mud Lake (Bastard Township, Rideau Lakes)
- Mud Lake (South Crosby Township, Rideau Lakes)

Lennox and Addington County

- Mud Lake (Addington Highlands)
- Mud Lake (Greater Napanee)

Manitoulin District

- Mud Lake (Northeastern Manitoulin and the Islands)
- Mud Lake (Central Manitoulin)

Nipissing District

- Mud Lake (Pardo Township, Nipissing District)
- Mud Lake (West Nipissing)
- Mud Lake (Fitzgerald Township, Nipissing District)
- Mud Lake (Kenny Township, Nipissing District)

Northumberland County

- Mud Lake (Northumberland County)

Oxford County

- Mud Lake (Oxford County)

Ottawa

- Mud Lake (Ottawa)

Parry Sound District

- Mud Lake (Brown Township, Parry Sound District)
- Mud Lake (Nipissing)
- Mud Lake (Burton Township, Whitestone)
- Mud Lake (The Archipelago)
- Mud Lake (Wilson Township, Parry Sound District)
- Mud Lake (Hagerman Township, Whitestone)
- Mud Lake (Lount Township, Parry Sound District)

== Mud (Rainy River–Timiskaming) ==
Rainy River District

- Mud Lake (La Vallee)
- Mud Lake (Spohn Township, Rainy River District)
- Mud Lake (Little Turtle River, Rainy River District)
- Mud Lake (Weaver Township, Rainy River District)
- Mud Lake (Chapple)
- Mud Lake (Atikokan)

Renfrew County

- Mud Lake (Blithfield Township, Greater Madawaska)
- Mud Lake (Brougham Township, Greater Madawaska)
- Mud Lake (Bonnechere Valley)
- Mud Lake (Laurentian Valley)
- Mud Lake (Killaloe, Hagarty and Richards)

Simcoe County

- Mud Lake (Ramara)
- Mud Lake (Tay)

Stormont, Dundas and Glengarry United Counties

- Mud Lake (Stormont, Dundas and Glengarry United Counties)

Sudbury District

- Mud Lake (Hess Township, Sudbury District)
- Mud Lake (Servos Township, Sudbury District)

Thunder Bay District

- Mud Lake (Terrace Bay)
- Mud Lake (Haines Township, Thunder Bay District)
- Mud Lake (Dawson Road Lots Township, Thunder Bay District)
- Mud Lake (Saganaga Lake, Thunder Bay District)

Timiskaming District

- Mud Lake (Brigstocke Township, Timiskaming District)
- Mud Lake (Ingram Township, Timiskaming District)
- Mud Lake (Lebel Township, Timiskaming District)

== Mud Lake North–Mudv ==
- Mud Lake North
- Mud Lakes
- Mud Pond (Ottawa)
- Mud Pond (Hastings Highlands)
- Mud Pond (Carlow/Mayo)
- Mud Pond (Renfrew County)
- Mudcat Lake (West Nipissing)
- Mudcat Lake (Fitzgerald Township, Nipissing District)
- Mudchannel Lake
- Mudding Lake
- Muddle Lake
- Muddu Lake
- Muddy Lake
- Mudge Lake
- Mudhen Lake
- Mudhole Lake (Algoma District)
- Mudhole Lake (Thunder Bay District)
- Mudpack Lake
- Mudswamp Lake
- Mudturtle Lake (Rainy River District)
- Mudturtle Lake (Renfrew County)
- Mud Turtle Lake (Nipissing District)
- Mud Turtle Lake (Hastings County)
- Mudville Lake

== Mug–Mun ==
- Mug Lake (Thunder Bay District)
- Mug Lake (Nipissing District)
- Mug Lake (Muskoka District)
- Muhekun Lake
- Muhquoh Lake
- Loch Muich
- Muir Lake (Thunder Bay District)
- Muir Lake (Sudbury District)
- Muir Lake (Nipissing District)
- Muise Lake
- Mujekiwis Lake
- Mukukee Lake
- Mukwa Lake
- Mulcahy Lake
- Muldrew Lake
- Muldrew Lakes
- Mule Lake (Sudbury District)
- Mule Lake (Timiskaming District)
- Mullen Lake (Renfrew County)
- Mullen Lake (Kenora District)
- Mullen Lake (Timiskaming District)
- Mullen Lake (Algoma District)
- Muller Lake
- Mullet Lake
- Mulligan Lake (Kenora District)
- Mulligan Lake (Timiskaming District)
- Mullin Lake
- Mullin's Mill Pond
- Mulloy Lake
- Mulven Lake
- Mulvey Lake
- Mumford Lake
- Mums Lake
- Munch Lake
- Mund Lake
- Mundell Lake
- Mungall Lake
- Munnery Lake
- Munro Lake (Thunder Bay District)
- Munro Lake (Rainy River District)
- Munro Lake (Cochrane District)
- Munroe Lake
- Munsons Lake
- Munster Lake
- Munuscong Lake

== Mur ==
- Murack Lake
- Murdoch Lake
- Murdock Lake (Sudbury District)
- Murdock Lake (Parry Sound District)
- Murdock Lake (Kenora District)
- Murdock Lake (Nipissing District)
- Murfitt Lake
- Muriel Lake (Manitoulin District)
- Muriel Lake (Muriel River, Thunder Bay District)
- Muriel Lake (Hogarth Township, Thunder Bay District)
- Muriel Lake (Kenora District)
- Murk Lake
- Murky Lake
- Murphy Lake (Kawartha Lakes)
- Murphy Lake (Jackson Township, Algoma District)
- Murphy Lake (Lamport Township, Thunder Bay District)
- Murphy Lake (Renfrew County)
- Murphy Lake (GTP Block 2 Township, Thunder Bay District)
- Murphy Lake (Lennox and Addington County)
- Murphy Lake (Cochrane District)
- Murphy Lake (Abotossaway Township, Algoma District)
- Murphy Lake (Tiernan Township, Algoma District)
- Murphy Lake (Arnott Township, Algoma District)
- Murphys Lake (Brudenell, Lyndoch and Raglan)
- Murphys Lake (Madawaska Valley)
- Murr Lake
- Murray Lake (Roosevelt Township, Sudbury District)
- Murray Lake (Grasett Township, Algoma District)
- Murray Lake (Bruyere Township, Algoma District)
- Murray Lake (Davis Township, Sudbury District)
- Murray Lake (Martel Township, Algoma District)
- Murray Lake (Lanark County)
- Murray Lake (Thunder Bay District)
- Murrell Lake

== Musc–Musi ==
- Musca Lake (Thunder Bay District)
- Musca Lake (Kenora District)
- Musclow Lake (Kenora District)
- Musclow Lake (Renfrew County)
- Muscovite Lake
- Musgrave Lake
- Musgrove Lake
- Mush Lake
- Musher Lake
- Mushkasu Lake
- Music Lake (Parry Sound District)
- Music Lake (Nipissing District)

== Musk–Musw ==
- Musk Lake (Sudbury District)
- Musk Lake (Kenora District)
- Muskasenda Lake
- Muskeg Lake (Sudbury District)
- Muskeg Lake (Thunder Bay District)
- Muskeg Lake (Rainy River District)
- Muskeg Lake (Nipissing District)
- Muskeg Narrows Lake
- Muskego Lake
- Muskegsagagen Lake
- Muskie Lake (Echo Township, Kenora District)
- Muskie Lake (Kirkup Township, Kenora District)
- Muskiga Lake
- Lake Muskoka
- Muskosung Lake
- Muskrat Dam Lake
- Muskrat Lake (Muskrat River, Thunder Bay District)
- Muskrat Lake (Frontenac County)
- Muskrat Lake (Umbach Township, Kenora District)
- Muskrat Lake (Madawaska Valley)
- Muskrat Lake (Sudbury District)
- Muskrat Lake (Cochrane District)
- Muskrat Lake (Greater Madawaska)
- Muskrat Lake (Rainy River District)
- Muskrat Lake (Whitewater Region)
- Muskrat Lake (Parry Sound District)
- Muskrat Lake (Cat Tail River, Thunder Bay District)
- Muskrat Lake (Nipissing District)
- Muskrat Lake (Pettypiece Township, Kenora District)
- Muskrat Lake (Hastings County)
- Muskrat's House Lake
- Muskwash Lake
- Muskwaysee Lake
- Musky Narrows Lake
- Muslim Lake
- Muslin Lake
- Musquash Lake (Sudbury District)
- Musquash Lake (Thunder Bay District)
- Musselman Lake
- Musser Lakes
- Mussy Lake
- Mustela Lake
- Muswabik Lake

== Mut ==
- Mutch Lake
- Mutcheguis Lake
- Mutrie Lake
- Mutt Lake (Sudbury District)
- Mutt Lake (Thunder Bay District)
- Mutton Lake

== My ==
- My Lake
- Myers Lake
- Mykiss Lake
- Myles Lake
- Myra Lake
- Myre Lake
- Myrick Lake
- Myrt Lake
- Myrtle Lake (Algoma District)
- Myrtle Lake (Kenora District)
- Myrtle Lake (Timiskaming District)
- Myrtle Lake (Parry Sound District)
- Mystery Lake (Thunder Bay District)
- Mystery Lake (Kenora District)
- Mystery Lake (Vankoughnet Township, Algoma District)
- Mystery Lake (Dumas Township, Algoma District)
- Mystery Lake (McIlveen Township, Algoma District)
- Myth Lake
