= McKenzie Lake (disambiguation) =

McKenzie Lake or Lake McKenzie may refer to:

in Australia

- Lake McKenzie, a lake in Queensland
- Lake Mackenzie (Tasmania), a lake in Tasmania

in Canada

- McKenzie Lake, Calgary, a neighborhood of Calgary, Alberta
- Ontario
  - McKenzie Lake (Cochrane District), a lake in Cochrane District
  - McKenzie Lake (Madawaska River), a lake mostly in Nipissing District and partly in Hastings County, that is part of the Madawaska River (Ontario) drainage basin
  - McKenzie Lake, Ontario, a settlement in the township of South Algonquin that is on McKenzie Lake (Madawaska River)
  - McKenzie Lake (Rainy River District), a lake in Rainy River District and within Quetico Provincial Park
  - McKenzie Lake (Sudbury District), a lake in Sudbury District near the border with Timiskaming District
  - McKenzie Lake (Timiskaming District), a lake in Timiskaming District

in the United States

- McKenzie Lake (Washington), a lake in Washington state

== See also ==
- Lake Helen Mackenzie
