= Mud Lake (Ontario) =

Mud Lake may refer to one of 74 lakes of the same name in Ontario, Canada, including:

== Algoma District ==
- Mud Lake (Sagard Township, Algoma District)
- Mud Lake (Finan Township, Algoma District)
- Mud Lake (Barager Township, Algoma District)
- Mud Lake (Varley Township, Algoma District)
- Mud Lake (White River)

== Bruce County ==
- Mud Lake (Bruce County)

== Cochrane District ==
- Mud Lake (Colquhoun Township, Cochrane District)
- Mud Lake (Timmins)

== Dufferin County ==
- Mud Lake (Dufferin County)

== Durham Region ==
- Mud Lake (Durham Region)

== Frontenac County ==
- Mud Lake (South Frontenac)
- Mud Lake (North Frontenac)

== Greater Sudbury ==
- Mud Lake (Telfer Township, Greater Sudbury)
- Mud Lake (Waters Township, Greater Sudbury)
- Mud Lake (Norman Township, Greater Sudbury)
- Mud Lake (Snider Township, Greater Sudbury)
- Mud Lake (Fairbank Township, Greater Sudbury)

== Grey County ==
- Mud Lake (Georgian Bluffs)
- Mud Lake (Chatsworth)
- Mud Lake (Grey Highlands)

== Hastings County ==
- Mud Lake (Hastings County)

== Huron County ==
- Mud Lake (Huron County)

== Kenora District ==
- Mud Lake (MacNicol Township, Kenora District)
- Mud Lake (Selby Lake, Kenora District)
- Mud Lake (Sioux Lookout)
- Mud Lake (Hook Lake, Kenora District)

== Lanark County ==
- Mud Lake (Lanark County)

== Leeds and Grenville United Counties ==
- Mud Lake (Lansdowne Township, Leeds and the Thousand Islands)
- Mud Lake (Escott Township, Leeds and the Thousand Islands)
- Mud Lake (Elizabethtown-Kitley)
- Mud Lake (Athens)
- Mud Lake (Bastard Township, Rideau Lakes)
- Mud Lake (South Crosby Township, Rideau Lakes)

== Lennox and Addington County ==
- Mud Lake (Addington Highlands)
- Mud Lake (Greater Napanee)

== Manitoulin District ==
- Mud Lake (Northeastern Manitoulin and the Islands)
- Mud Lake (Central Manitoulin)

== Nipissing District ==
- Mud Lake (Pardo Township, Nipissing District)
- Mud Lake (West Nipissing)
- Mud Lake (Fitzgerald Township, Nipissing District)
- Mud Lake (Kenny Township, Nipissing District)

== Northumberland County ==
- Mud Lake (Northumberland County)

== Oxford County ==
- Mud Lake (Oxford County)

== Ottawa ==
- Mud Lake (Ottawa)

== Parry Sound District ==
- Mud Lake (Brown Township, Parry Sound District)
- Mud Lake (Nipissing)
- Mud Lake (Burton Township, Whitestone)
- Mud Lake (The Archipelago)
- Mud Lake (Wilson Township, Parry Sound District)
- Mud Lake (Hagerman Township, Whitestone)
- Mud Lake (Lount Township, Parry Sound District)

== Rainy River District ==
- Mud Lake (La Vallee)
- Mud Lake (Spohn Township, Rainy River District)
- Mud Lake (Little Turtle River, Rainy River District)
- Mud Lake (Weaver Township, Rainy River District)
- Mud Lake (Chapple)
- Mud Lake (Atikokan)

== Renfrew County ==
- Mud Lake (Blithfield Township, Greater Madawaska)
- Mud Lake (Brougham Township, Greater Madawaska)
- Mud Lake (Bonnechere Valley)
- Mud Lake (Laurentian Valley)
- Mud Lake (Killaloe, Hagarty and Richards)

== Simcoe County ==
- Mud Lake (Ramara)
- Mud Lake (Tay)

== Stormont, Dundas and Glengarry United Counties ==
- Mud Lake (Stormont, Dundas and Glengarry United Counties)

== Sudbury District ==
- Mud Lake (Hess Township, Sudbury District)
- Mud Lake (Servos Township, Sudbury District)

== Thunder Bay District ==
- Mud Lake (Terrace Bay)
- Mud Lake (Haines Township, Thunder Bay District)
- Mud Lake (Dawson Road Lots Township, Thunder Bay District)
- Mud Lake (Saganaga Lake, Thunder Bay District)

== Timiskaming District ==
- Mud Lake (Brigstocke Township, Timiskaming District)
- Mud Lake (Ingram Township, Timiskaming District)
- Mud Lake (Lebel Township, Timiskaming District)

== See also ==
- Mud Lake, Ontario, a community in the municipality of North Algona Wilberforce, Renfrew County
