= Howard Shaw =

Howard Shaw may refer to:

- Howard Van Doren Shaw (1869–1926), American architect
- Howard Shaw (author) (born 1934), British teacher and writer
- SS Howard L. Shaw, a Great Lakes freighter

== See also ==
- Shaw–Howard University station, a station on the Washington Metro often referred to as Shaw-Howard
