= Little Black Donald Creek =

Stream in Renfrew County, Ontario, Canada

Little Black Donald Creek petit ruisseau Black Donald
- Location of the mouth of the creek in Southern Ontario

Location
- Country: Canada
- Province: Ontario
- Region: Eastern Ontario
- County: Renfrew
- Municipality: Greater Madawaska

Physical characteristics
- Source: Mud Lake
  - coordinates: 45°16′24.5″N 76°56′43.7″W
  - elevation: 297 m (974 ft)
- Mouth: Black Donald Lake on the Madawaska River
  - coordinates: 45°14′20″N 76°56′26″W
  - elevation: 248 m (814 ft)

Basin features
- River system: Saint Lawrence River drainage basin

Little Black Donald Creek (French: petit ruisseau Black Donald) is a stream in Greater Madawaska, Renfrew County in Eastern Ontario, Canada. It is in the Saint Lawrence River drainage basin and is a left tributary of the Madawaska River at Black Donald Lake.

== Course ==
Little Black Donald Creek begins at the south end of Mud Lake. It flows southwest, then turns south. The creek passes under Renfrew County Road 65, and reaches its mouth at the north shore of Black Donald Lake on the Madawaska River. The Madawaska River flows via the Ottawa River to the Saint Lawrence River.
