= Harebell Lake =

Lake in Ontario, Canada

- lac Harebell
- Location in Ontario
- Location: Timiskaming District, Ontario
- Coordinates: 47°32′46″N 80°14′06″W
- Part of: Saint Lawrence River drainage basin
- Primary inflows: unnamed creek
- Primary outflows: unnamed creek
- Basin countries: Canada
- Max. length: 440 m (1,440 ft)
- Max. width: 190 m (620 ft)
- Surface elevation: 319 m (1,047 ft)

Harebell Lake (French: lac Harebell) is a lake in geographic Speight Township in the Unorganized West Part of Timiskaming District in Northeastern Ontario, Canada. It is part of the Saint Lawrence River drainage basin, and is about 22 kilometres (14 mi) southwest of the community of Kenabeek.

The lake has one unnamed inflow, at the southwest. The primary outflow is an unnamed creek at the northeast which flows to McKenzie Lake and onward, flowing subsequently via Spray Creek, Spring Creek, the Montreal River and the Ottawa River to the Saint Lawrence River.

== See also ==
- List of lakes in Ontario
