= SS Howard L. Shaw =

Great Lakes freighter (1900)

Coordinates: 43.626487°N 79.417418°W

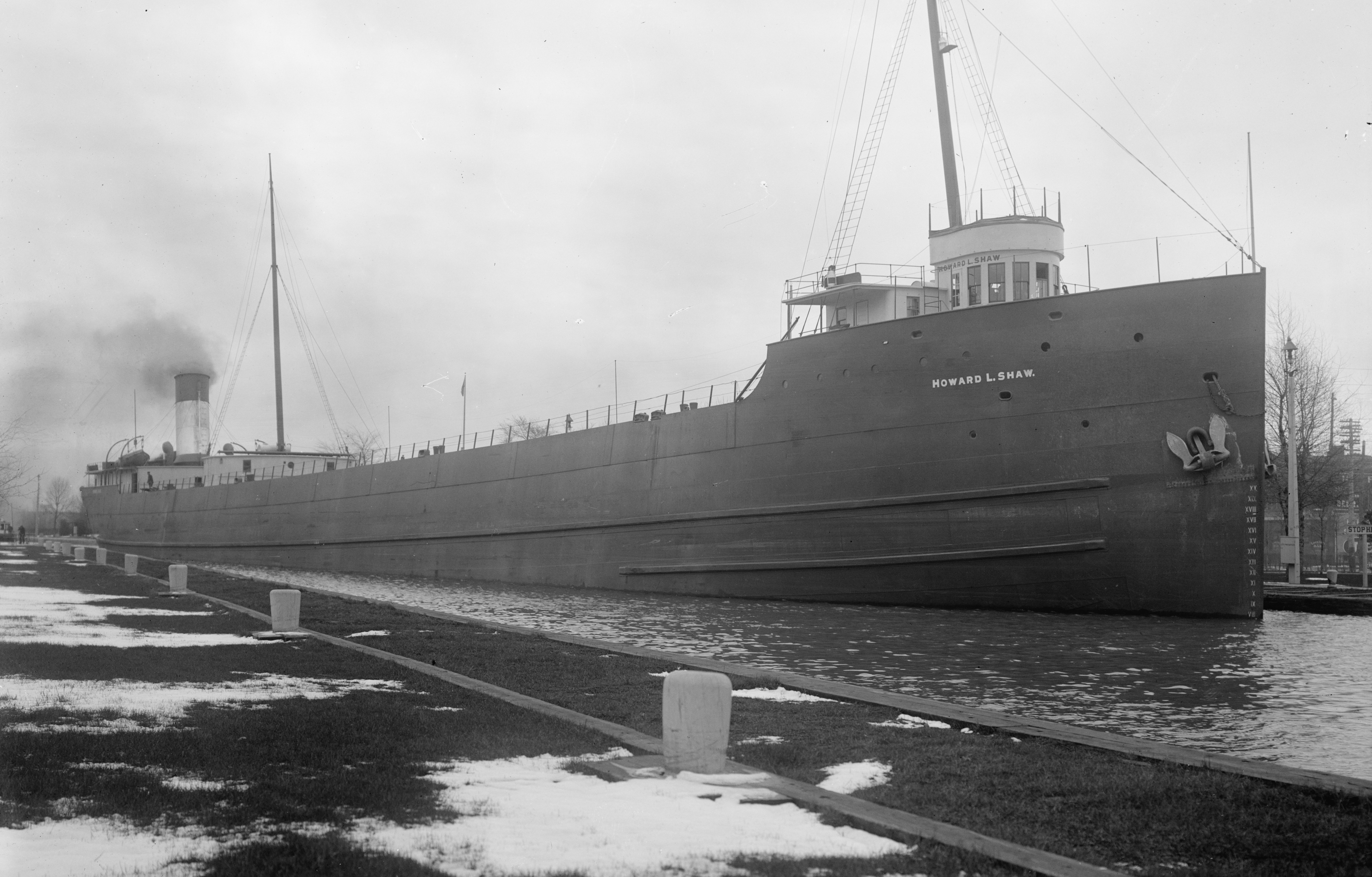
- Howard L. Shaw in Poe Lock

History

United States
- Name: Howard L. Shaw
- Operator: John Shaw Transit Company (1900-1901); Eddy Shaw Transit Company (a subsidiary of John Shaw Transit Company) (1901-1902); Donora Mining Company (a subsidiary of U.S. Steel) (1902-1904); Pittsburgh Steamship Company (1904-1940); Upper Lakes & St. Lawrence Transportation Company (1940-1969)
- Port of registry: United States, Port Huron, Michigan 1900-1902; Duluth, Minnesota 1902-1940; Toronto, Ontario 1940-1969
- Builder: Detroit Shipbuilding Company, Wyandotte, Michigan
- Yard number: 136
- Launched: September 15, 1900
- Completed: 1900
- In service: 1900
- Out of service: 1969
- Identification: U.S. Registry #96524
- Fate: Sunk as a breakwater at Ontario Place

General characteristics
- Class & type: Bulk Freighter
- Tonnage: 4,901 gross 3,802 net
- Length: 451 ft (137 m)
- Beam: 50 ft (15 m)
- Height: 28 ft (8.5 m)
- Installed power: 2 x Scotch marine boilers; 1,150 hp (860 kW)
- Propulsion: triple expansion steam engine; 1 × propeller
- Speed: 10 knots

Howard L. Shaw was a propeller driven freighter that operated on the Great Lakes of North America from her launching in 1900 to her retirement 1969. She is currently serving as a breakwater in Ontario Place on Lake Ontario.

== Design and construction ==
Howard L. Shaw was built by the Detroit Shipbuilding Company of Wyandotte, Michigan. Her hull had an overall length of 451 feet (137.5 m) and a length between perpendiculars of 428 feet (130.5 m), a beam of 51.5 feet (15.7 m), and was 28 feet (8.5 m) deep. She had a gross tonnage of 4,901, and a net tonnage of 3,802. She was driven by a 1,150 hp (860 kW) triple expansion steam engine, with two coal–fired Scotch marine boilers providing steam. Howard L. Shaw was launched on 15 September 1900 as hull #136.

== Service history ==
She entered service for the Eddy-Shaw Transit Company of Bay City, Michigan, the year she was built. On 1 November 1900, Howard L. Shaw loaded 260,000 bushels of flax in Duluth, Minnesota which was a new port record. The cost of the cargo was valued at $468,000.

In 1902 Howard L. Shaw was purchased by U.S. Steel. In 1904 Howard L. Shaw was transferred to the Pittsburgh Steamship Company. On 25 May 1906 Howard L. Shaw passed between the cable connecting the steamer Coralia and her barge Maia which raked the deck of spars and the smokestack. Howard L. Shaw ran aground after the collision. Howard L. Shaw was the last vessel to see the wooden steamer John Owen on 12 November 1919 before she was lost in a storm on Lake Superior. In 1922 Howard L. Shaw's hull was reconstructed with arch frames by the Toledo Shipbuilding Company of Toledo, Ohio, while in Toledo she also had her old boilers replaced by brand new Scotch marine boilers. On 26 April 1926, Howard L. Shaw ran aground in Mud Lake while downbound from the St. Marys River.

== Canadian registry ==
Howard L. Shaw was sold to the Upper Lakes & St. Lawrence Transportation Company (renamed Upper Lakes Shipping Ltd. in 1959) in late 1940 (her Canadian identification was C172356). On 13 December 1958 Howard L. Shaw while downbound was stuck in ice delaying eleven other freighters. On 6 September 1963 Howard L. Shaw was dynamited in Chicago, Illinois because of a labor dispute between American and Canadian labor unions. The explosion blew a 2-foot (0.61 m) hole in the port side of the vessel. The ship was later towed to Chicago, Illinois for repairs. Howard L. Shaw was tied up at a pier since 22 April.

== Breakwater ==
Howard L. Shaw was sold to the Toronto Harbor Commissioners. On 4 July 1969 she was sunk as a breakwater at Ontario Place along with her fleet mates the steamers Douglas Houghton and Victorius.
