= Maynard Lake =

Lake in Ontario, Canada

- View from the Western shoreline around 7:45 AM

- Location within Ontario
- Location: Ontario
- Coordinates: 50.359°N 93.888°W
- Primary inflows: English River
- Primary outflows: Maynard Falls
- Basin countries: Canada
- Surface area: 12.3 square miles (32 km^{2})
- Max. depth: 135 feet (41 m)
- Surface elevation: 1,050 feet (320 m) Above Sea Level
- Islands: 10 - 20

Maynard Lake is located on the English River system, 80 kilometres (50 mi) northeast of Kenora, Ontario.

== Access ==
Maynard Lake is only accessible via seaplane. During the winter it can be accessed by logging roads and ice roads.

Walsten Air Otter tied to the dock at Maynard

== See also ==
- List of lakes in Ontario
