= Morrison Lake (Ontario) =

Lake in Muskoka District Municipality, Ontario, Canada

- Location within Ontario
- Location: Ontario
- Coordinates: 44.869933°N 79.454412°W
- Basin countries: Canada

Morrison Lake is a lake in Muskoka District, Ontario, Canada. There is also a Wetland Conservation Reserve located on the west of the lake. It is a rather large lake with a number of islands within, amongst these are Mile Island, Betula Island, Belle Isle, Ida Isle and Otiosus.

== See also ==
- List of lakes in Ontario
