= Mud Lake (Brougham Township) =

Lake in Renfrew County, Ontario, Canada

- lac Mud
- Location in Southern Ontario
- Location: Renfrew County, Ontario
- Coordinates: 45°16′34″N 76°56′37″W
- Part of: Saint Lawrence River drainage basin
- Primary outflows: Little Black Donald Creek
- Basin countries: Canada
- Max. length: 640 m (2,100 ft)
- Max. width: 510 m (1,670 ft)
- Surface elevation: 297 m (974 ft)

Mud Lake (French: lac Mud) is a lake in Greater Madawaska, Renfrew County in Eastern Ontario, Canada. It is in geographic Brougham Township, is part of the Saint Lawrence River drainage basin, and is the source of Little Black Donald Creek.

The lake has two unnamed inflows: one at the north, and a second at the east. The primary outflow is Little Black Donald Creek at the south, which flows via Black Donald Lake, the Madawaska River, and the Ottawa River to the Saint Lawrence River.

== See also ==
- List of lakes in Ontario
