= Mameigwess Lake (Bradshaw Township) =

- lac Mameigwess
- Location in Ontario
- Location: Kenora District, Ontario
- Coordinates: 49°33′03″N 91°49′32″W
- Type: Lake
- Part of: Hudson Bay drainage basin
- Primary outflows: Mameigwess River
- Basin countries: Canada
- Max. length: 14 kilometres (8.7 mi)
- Max. width: 8 kilometres (5.0 mi)
- Surface elevation: 405 metres (1,329 ft)

Mameigwess Lake (French: lac Mameigwess) is a lake in the south of the Unorganized Part of Kenora District in northwestern Ontario, Canada. The lake is in the Hudson Bay drainage basin.

The lake is 14 kilometres (8.7 mi) long and 8 kilometres (5.0 mi) wide, and lies at an elevation of 405 metres (1,329 ft). The southwest corner of the lake is in geographic Isley Township and the southeast corner of the lake in geographic Bradshaw Township. The lake is about 15 kilometres (9.3 mi) northwest of the community of Ignace; and 6 kilometres (3.7 mi) north of Ontario Highway 17, and can be reached from that highway by road. There is a hunting and fishing camp on the lake.

There are numerous unnamed inflows. The primary outflow, at the southeast in geographic Bradshaw Township, is the Mameigwess River, which flows via the Agimak River, the English River, the Winnipeg River and the Nelson River to Hudson Bay.
