= MacDowell Lake =

Lake in Ontario, Canada

- Location within Ontario
- Location: Ontario
- Coordinates: 52.232°N 92.730°W
- Basin countries: Canada

MacDowell Lake is a lake in northwestern Kenora District, Ontario, Canada.

== See also ==
- List of lakes in Ontario
