= McKenzie Lake (Cochrane District) =

Lake in Cochrane District, Ontario, Canada

- lac McKenzie
- Location in Ontario
- Location: Cochrane District, Ontario
- Coordinates: 49°41′11″N 82°26′52″W
- Part of: James Bay drainage basin
- Primary inflows: unnamed creek
- Primary outflows: unnamed creek
- Basin countries: Canada
- Max. length: 1,650 m (5,410 ft)
- Max. width: 680 m (2,230 ft)
- Surface elevation: 220 m (720 ft)

McKenzie Lake (French: lac McKenzie) is a lake in geographic Pearce Township in the Unorganized North Part of Cochrane District in northeastern Ontario, Canada. It is part of the James Bay drainage Basin, and is about 30 kilometres (19 mi) north of the town of Kapuskasing.

The lake has two unnamed inflows at the west and northeast. The primary outflow is an unnamed creek at the northwest which flows via Guilfoyle Creek, the Opasatika River, the Missinaibi River and the Moose River to James Bay.

== See also ==
- List of lakes in Ontario
