= McKenzie Lake (Rainy River District) =

Lake in Rainy River District, Ontario, Canada

- lac McKenzie
- Location in Ontario
- Location: Rainy River District, Ontario
- Coordinates: 48°27′34″N 91°03′18″W
- Part of: Hudson Bay drainage basin
- Primary inflows: Ferguson Creek, unnamed creek
- Primary outflows: unnamed creek
- Basin countries: Canada
- Max. length: 10.5 km (6.5 mi)
- Max. width: 5 km (3.1 mi)
- Surface elevation: 417 m (1,368 ft)

McKenzie Lake (French: lac McKenzie) is a lake in the Unorganized Part of Rainy River District in northwestern Ontario, Canada. It is part of the Hudson Bay drainage basin, and lies within Quetico Provincial Park.

The primary inflows are Ferguson Creek at the northwest, arriving from Ferguson Lake, and an unnamed creek at the northeast. The primary outflow is an unnamed creek at the southwest which flows to McKenzie Bay on Kawnipi Lake. Kawnipi Lake drains via the Maligne River, the Namakan River, the Rainy River, the Winnipeg River and the Nelson River to Hudson Bay.

== See also ==
- List of lakes in Ontario
