= McKenzie Lake (Sudbury District) =

Lake in Sudbury District, Ontario, Canada

- lac McKenzie
- Location in Ontario
- Location: Sudbury District, Ontario
- Coordinates: 47°19′01″N 81°05′05″W
- Part of: Great Lakes Basin
- Primary inflows: unnamed creek
- Primary outflows: unnamed creek
- Basin countries: Canada
- Max. length: 870 m (2,850 ft)
- Max. width: 470 m (1,540 ft)
- Surface elevation: 379 m (1,243 ft)

McKenzie Lake (French: lac McKenzie) is a lake in geographic Unwin Township in the Unorganized North Part of Sudbury District in northeastern Ontario, Canada. It is part of the Great Lakes Basin, and is just 300 metres (980 ft) from the border with the southwest corner of geographic Dufferin Township in Timiskaming District.

The lake has one unnamed inflow at the southwest. The primary outflow is an unnamed creek at the north which flows via Demott Creek, Silvester Creek, the Wanapitei River and the French River to Lake Huron.

== See also ==
- List of lakes in Ontario
