= McKenzie Lake (Timiskaming District) =

Lake in Timiskaming District, Ontario, Canada

- lac McKenzie
- Location in Ontario
- Location: Timiskaming District, Ontario
- Coordinates: 47°33′25″N 80°13′18″W
- Part of: Saint Lawrence River drainage basin
- Primary inflows: unnamed creek
- Primary outflows: unnamed creek
- Basin countries: Canada
- Max. length: 2,100 m (6,900 ft)
- Max. width: 550 m (1,800 ft)
- Surface elevation: 309 m (1,014 ft)

McKenzie Lake (French: lac McKenzie) is a lake in geographic Speight Township in the Unorganized West Part of Timiskaming District in Northeastern Ontario, Canada. It is part of the Saint Lawrence River drainage basin, and is about 20 kilometres (12 mi) southwest of the community of Kenabeek.

The lake has two unnamed inflows: one at the south, arriving from Harebell Lake, and one at the west. The primary outflow is an unnamed creek at the north which flows via Spray Creek, Spring Creek, the Montreal River and the Ottawa River to the Saint Lawrence River.

== See also ==
- List of lakes in Ontario
