= Mud Lake (Bruce County) =

Lake in Ontario, Canada

- lac Mud
- Location in southern Ontario
- Location: Peterborough County, Ontario
- Coordinates: 44°47′58″N 81°14′32″W
- Part of: Great Lakes Basin
- Primary outflows: unnamed creek
- Basin countries: Canada
- Max. length: 940 m (3,080 ft)
- Max. width: 530 m (1,740 ft)
- Surface elevation: 187 m (614 ft)

Mud Lake (French: lac Mud) is a lake in South Bruce Peninsula, Bruce County in southwestern Ontario, Canada. It is part of the Great Lakes Basin, and is about 10 kilometres (6.2 mi) northwest of the community of Wiarton.

The lake has one unnamed inflow at the northeast. The primary outflow is an unnamed creek at the southwest which flows to Isaac Lake on the Rankin River, which in turn flows via the Sauble River to Lake Huron.

== See also ==
- List of lakes in Ontario
