= Mud Lake (Blithfield Township) =

Lake in Renfrew County, Ontario, Canada, in geographic Blithfield Township

- lac Mud
- Location in Eastern Ontario
- Location: Renfrew County, Ontario
- Coordinates: 45°13′52″N 76°44′18″W
- Part of: Saint Lawrence River drainage basin
- Primary outflows: unnamed creek
- Basin countries: Canada
- Max. length: 180 m (590 ft)
- Max. width: 140 m (460 ft)
- Surface elevation: 277 m (909 ft)

Mud Lake (French: lac Mud) is a lake in Greater Madawaska, Renfrew County in Eastern Ontario, Canada. It is in geographic Blithfield Township, and is part of the Saint Lawrence River drainage basin.

The lake has no inflows. The primary outflow is an unnamed creek at the north, which flows via the Madawaska River, and the Ottawa River to the Saint Lawrence River.

== See also ==
- List of lakes in Ontario
