= List of countries with Burger King franchises =

Map of countries where Burger King operates worldwide: Burger King Burger King (Russia, without corporate support) Hungry Jack's (Australia)

This is a list of countries with Burger King franchises. As of December 31, 2025, Burger King operated over 19,000 restaurants across 126 countries and territories.

Burger King (BK) itself began as a franchise of its progenitor company, Insta-Burger King. It grew in the United States using a combination of corporate locations and franchising, before divesting itself of its corporate holdings in 2013. It began its international expansion in 1969 with a location in Canada, followed by Australia in 1971, and Europe in 1975. Latin America and South America became part of its market later in that decade, Asia followed in the 1980s, and Northern Africa and the Middle East followed shortly thereafter. Sub-Saharan Africa and the former nations of the Iron Curtain came much later, beginning in the late 1990s and continuing into the 2010s.

Today, Burger King operates in almost every country in the Western Hemisphere, and most of Europe and East Asia. Burger King also has a longstanding presence at U.S. Army and U.S. Air Force installations worldwide, dating back to the 1980s under a contract with Army & Air Force Exchange Service. Today, while other chains such as Taco Bell, Popeyes, and Subway have a presence on military bases, virtually every major Army and Air Force installation hosts a BK restaurant.

== History ==
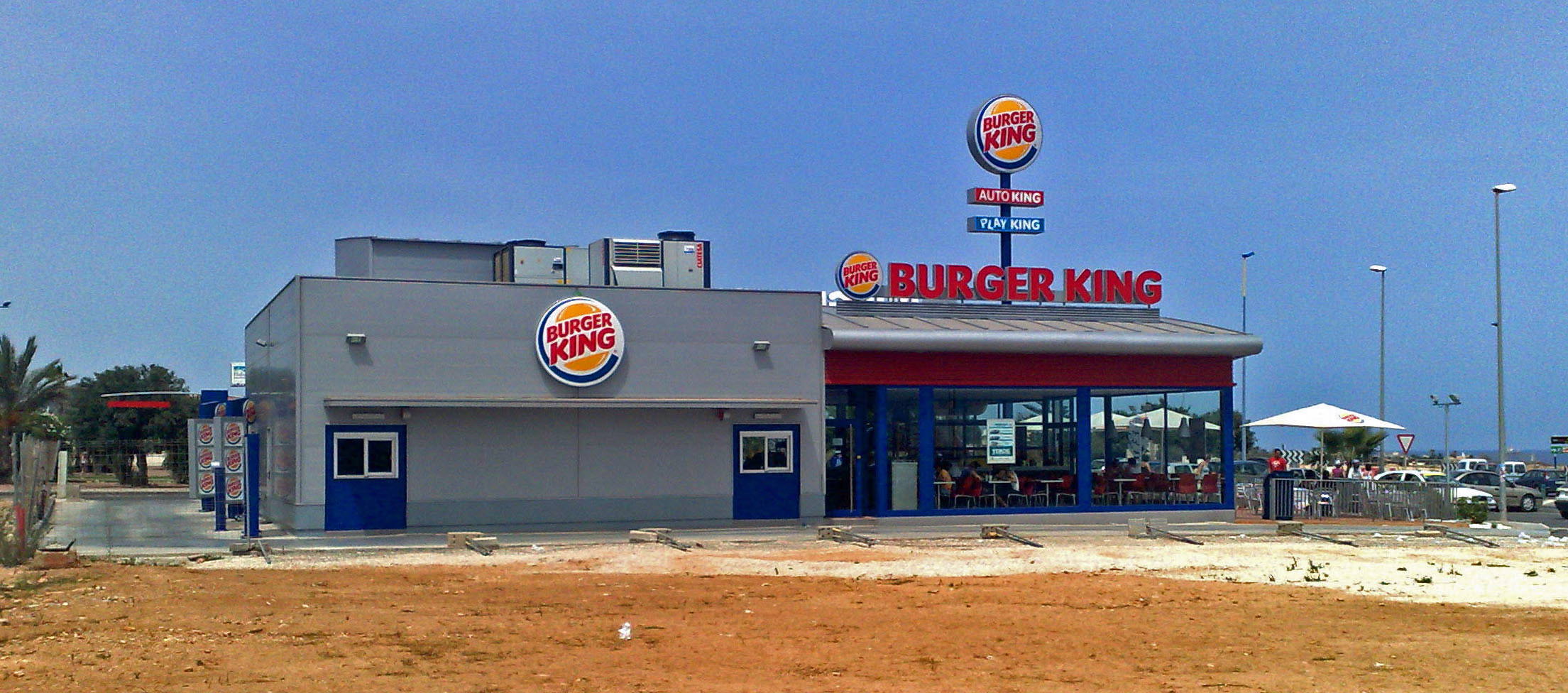
A Burger King restaurant with drive-thru, playground and terrace in Orihuela Costa, Spain. Spain was the location of the first continental European Burger King.

Burger King was first founded in Jacksonville, Florida, in 1953, as Insta-Burger King. Shortly after the acquisition of the chain by Pillsbury in 1967, Burger King opened its first Canadian restaurant in Windsor, Ontario, in 1969. Other international locations followed soon after: Oceania in 1971 with its Australian franchise Hungry Jack's, and Europe in 1975 with a restaurant in Madrid, Spain. Beginning in 1982, BK and its franchisees began operating stores in several East Asian countries, including Japan, Taiwan, Singapore and South Korea. Due to high competition, all of the Japanese locations were closed in 2001; however, BK reentered the Japanese market in June 2007. BK's Central and South American operations began in Mexico in the late 1970s, and by the early 1980s it was operating locations in Caracas, Venezuela, Santiago, Chile and Buenos Aires, Argentina.

While Burger King lags behind McDonald's in international locations by over 12,000 stores, by 2008 it had managed to become the largest chain in several countries, including Mexico and Spain.

The company divides its international operations into three segments: The Middle East, Europe and Africa division (EMEA), Asia-Pacific (APAC) and Latin America and the Caribbean (LAC). In each of these regions, Burger King has established several subsidiaries to develop strategic partnerships and alliances to expand into new territories. In its EMEA group, Burger King's Switzerland-based subsidiary Burger King Europe GmbH is responsible for the licensing and development of BK franchises in those regions. In the APAC region, the Singapore-based BK AsiaPac, Pte. Ltd. business unit handles franchising for East Asia, the Asian subcontinent and all Oceanic territories. The LAC region includes Mexico, Central and South America and the Caribbean Islands.

== Africa ==
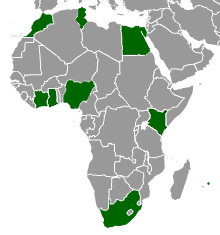
Map of countries in Africa with Burger King locations

During 2012, the African market saw a new agreement with Grand Parade Investments of South Africa to enter what was then Africa's largest economy, with the foundation of Burger King South Africa (BKSA). The first restaurant opened in 2013, in Cape Town. The company sold franchise rights to local gaming and slots machine operator Grand Parade Investments Ltd. In a deal with local petrochemical company Sasol, outlets were opened at filling stations across the country starting in 2014. BKSA was sold, as a master franchise to Emerging Capital Partners in 2021, for around R700 million.

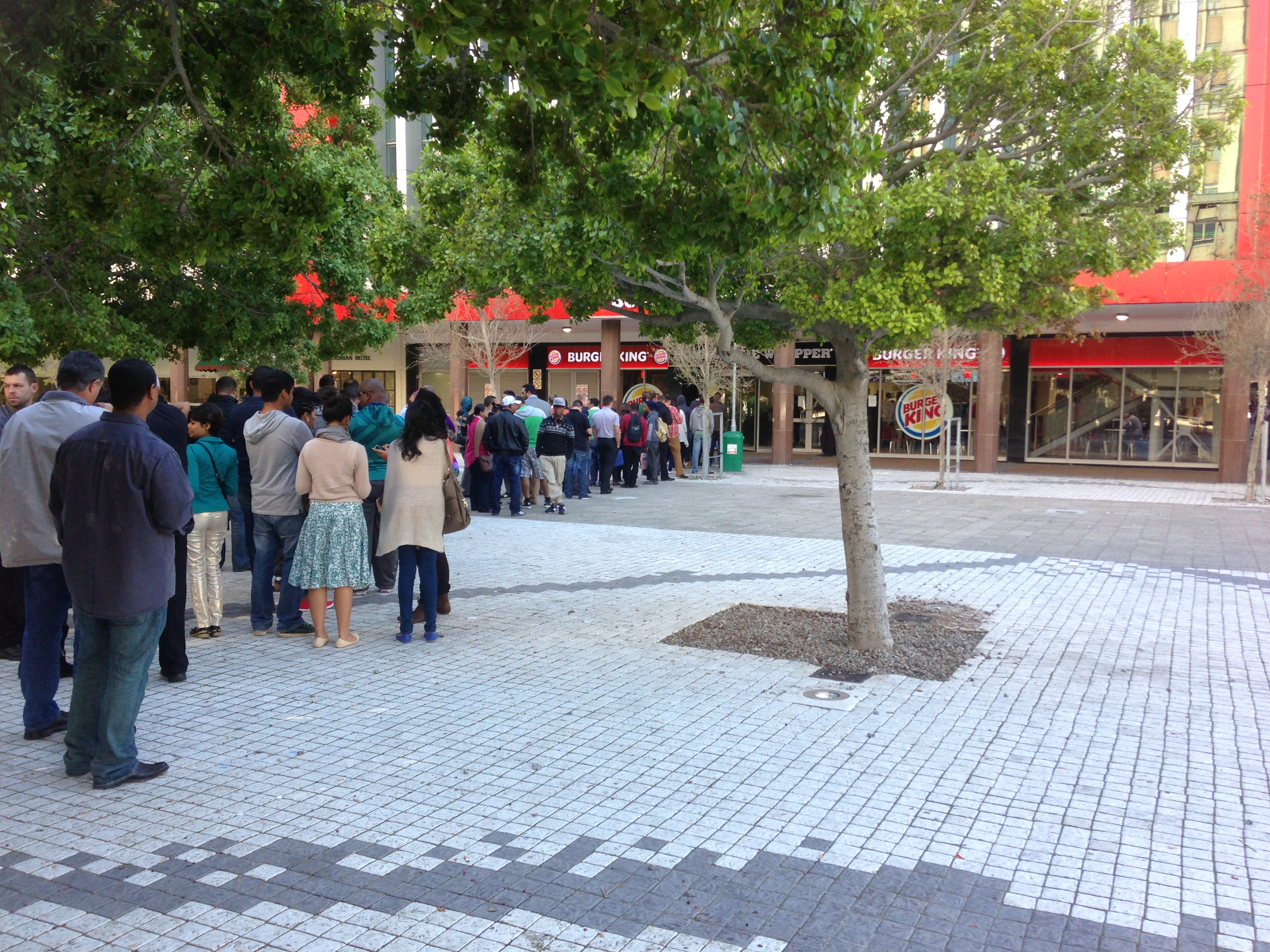
The opening of BK's first outlet in SA was located in Cape Town, and opened in May 2013

Country/territory	Year entered	No. of restaurants	Master franchisee	Notes
Djibouti	2022	2	Olayan Group	First location in Bawadi Mall, Djibouti.
Egypt	2007	44	Olayan Group	برغر كينغ (in Arabic). Olayan's food service subsidiary, Hana International, is the master franchisee for the Middle East and North Africa.
Ethiopia	2020	2	Belayab Foods Production PLC.	First location in Bole International Airport.
Ghana	2018	8	SIA QSR Ghana Ltd.	First location is in the Accra Mall.
Ivory Coast	2015	9	Servair	First location is in Marcory.
Kenya	2016	5	Servair	First location in the Hub Karen, Nairobi.
Mauritius	2021	7	CG Royal Food	First location at Bagatelle Mall.
Morocco	2011	41	General First Food Services	First location is in Casablanca.
Nigeria	2021	25	Allied Food and Confectionery Services Ltd	First location is in Victoria Island, Lagos.
Réunion	2017	17	Groupe Iriben	17 outlets. First outlet opened in Le Port on September 19, 2017.
Seychelles	2017	1	Minor International	One location at the airport, open to the general public.
South Africa	2013	169	Burger King South Africa (wholly owned by Emerging Capital Partners)	First location opened in Cape Town on 9 May 2013.
Tunisia	2019	1	General First Food Services Tunisia	First location is in Sousse in the Mall of Sousse; Halal.

== Asia ==
The first Burger King in Asia opened in Granville Road, Hong Kong on August 7, 1979, as the 2500th Burger King globally. In 1982, franchisees opened stores in several East Asian countries, including Japan, Taiwan, Singapore and South Korea.

In 1982, the license for Burger King's operations in Singapore was given to Food Systems. It planned to open its first outlet at Peninsular Plaza.

Burger King expanded to Japan in 1993 as a 50-50 venture with Seibu Railways Group. Its first outlet in Iruma opened on 22 September, with another in Yokohama and another suburb expected to open that year. Additional outlets were expected to open in station buildings owned by Seibu. Burger King was a latecomer in Japan's hamburger market, coming at a time of "recession". Unlike its competitor McDonald's, Burger King plans to leave its original menu untouched. Later owned by Japan Tobacco, it withdrew from the Japanese market in February 2001 with all of its 25 outlets sold to Lotteria. Burger King reentered the Japanese market by opening the first outlet in Shinjuku, Tokyo in November 2006.

It also reentered the Hong Kong market in December 2007. This time its Hong Kong operation is wholly owned by North Asia Strategic, who obtained the exclusive right to operate from BK AsiaPac Pte Limited. As of 2008, 15 stores were in operation. The brand subsequently downsized, closing its last urban branch in the territory on August 31, 2025 and leaving only one location remaining at the airport.

Country/territory	Year entered	No. of restaurants	Master franchisee	Notes
Bahrain	2007	1	Olayan Group	Halal
Bangladesh	2016	8	Tiffin Box (Bangla Trac)	
Brunei	2014	5	Sinofood Express	The first outlet opened on 25 February 2014 in Ambrym Road, Bandar Seri Begawan.
Cambodia	2013	14	Mong Reththy Group	Opened in Phnom Penh International Airport on 1 March 2013.
China	2005	1,247	CPE	汉堡王 (in Chinese). First outlet opened in Shanghai on 28 June 2005.
Hong Kong	1979	1	–	First operated in Hong Kong between the 1970s–1990s, and re-entered in 2007. Currently only one restaurant remaining active at Hong Kong International Airport, operated by SSP Group.
India	2014	577	Restaurant Brands Asia	The first store opened in November 2014 in Delhi.
Indonesia	1986	138	Restaurant Brands Asia	Previously operated in the country from 1986 to 1998, closing after the 1997 Asian financial crisis. It was reopened on April 26, 2007 with management from PT Sari Burger Indonesia.
Iraq	2019	16	Burger King Iraq GG	The first branch was opened in Erbil on November 18, 2019.
Israel	1994	18	Delek Group	ברגר קינג (in Hebrew). Burger King previously operated in Israel from 1994 to 2010, after which its locations were rebranded as Burgeranch. In June 2015, the chain announced plans to relaunch, and its first new branch opened on February 1, 2016.
Japan	1993	337	Goldman Sachs Alternatives	バーガーキング (bāgākin-gu, katakana spelling of Burger King) (in Japanese). Previously operated in the country from 1993 to 2001, returning in 2007.
Kuwait	1990	97	Olayan Group	First opened at an AAFES location following the First Gulf War.
Kazakhstan	2012	58	Holten Group	The first restaurant was opened in Almaty on May 28, 2012.
Lebanon	2001	18	Olayan Group	Halal.
Malaysia	1997	201	Rancak Selera	First location opened at Sungai Buloh Overhead Bridge in Sungai Buloh in 1997.
Maldives	2013	2	Minor International	First location opened at Ibrahim Nasir International Airport on July 8, 2013.
Mongolia	2015	17	Max Group	
Oman	1994	10	Olayan Group	Originally operated in the country from 1994 to 2005, reopening in 2010.
Philippines	1997	132	Jollibee Foods Corporation	The first Burger King branch in the Philippines opened at Robinsons Galleria, Quezon City in December 1997. PERF Restaurants Inc. (formerly PhilKing Restaurants and Development Corp.) was owned by Ayala Corporation until it was sold to BK Titans Inc. in 2006.
Qatar	1996	23	Olayan Group	Halal.
Saudi Arabia	1992	156	Olayan Group	برغر كينغ (in Arabic). Halal.
Singapore	1982	71	Rancak Selera	Halal. First BK Whopper Bar in Asia.
South Korea	1984	552	Affinity Equity Partners	버거킹 (in Korean).
Sri Lanka	2013	22	Softlogic Restaurants	
Taiwan	1989	106	Taiwan Steel Group	漢堡王 (in Chinese).
Thailand	1994	124	Minor International	Offers delivery services.
Timor-Leste	2013	2	East Timor Trading	Burger King is currently the first and only foreign fast food chain in East Timor. The first store opened in Dili in December 2013.
United Arab Emirates	1993	116	Olayan Group	Halal.
Uzbekistan	2025	5	Holten Group	
Vietnam	2011	20	Imex Pan-Pacific Group	First location opened at Tan Son Nhat International Airport on November 27, 2011.

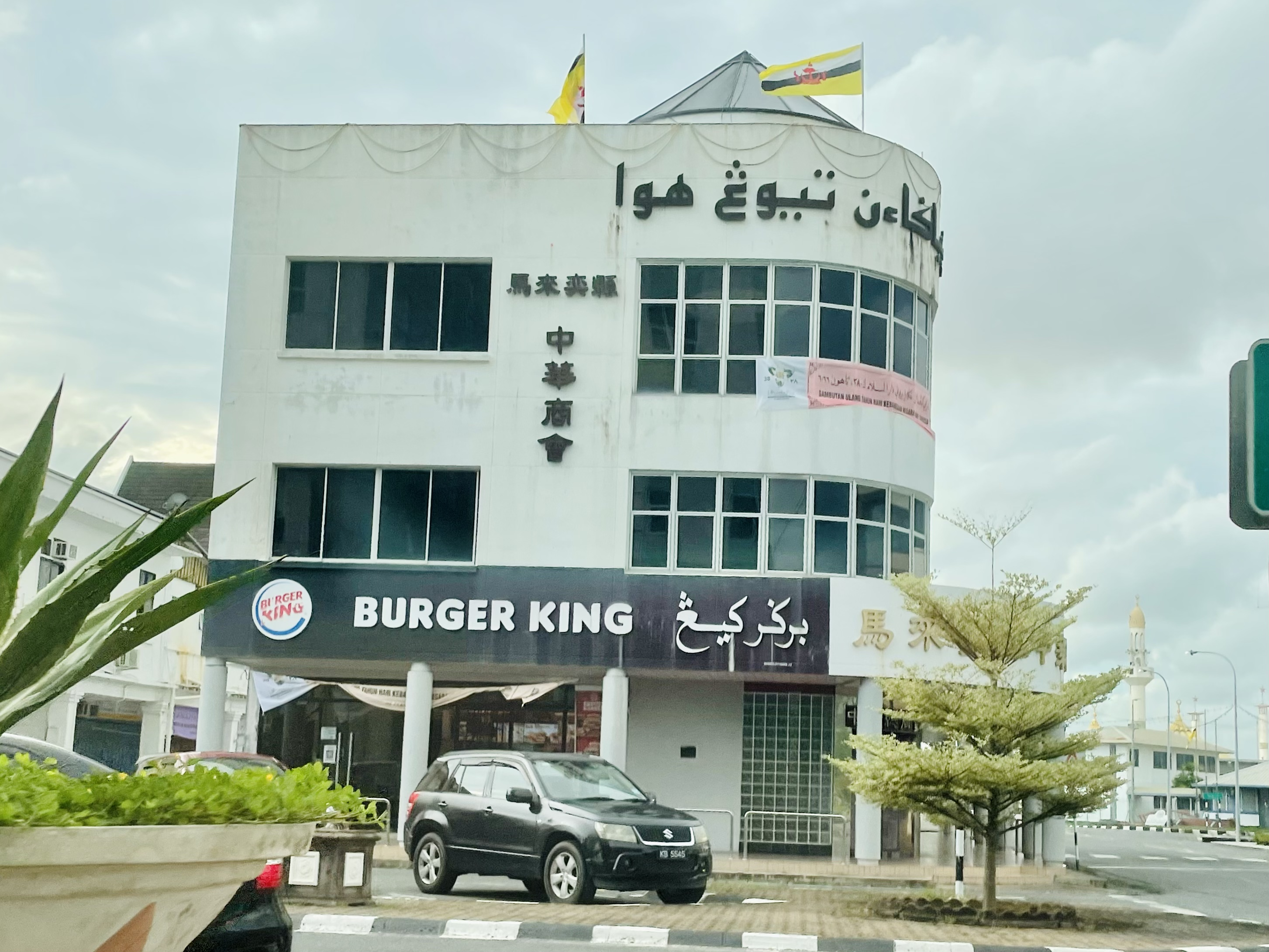
A Burger King restaurant in Kuala Belait, Brunei

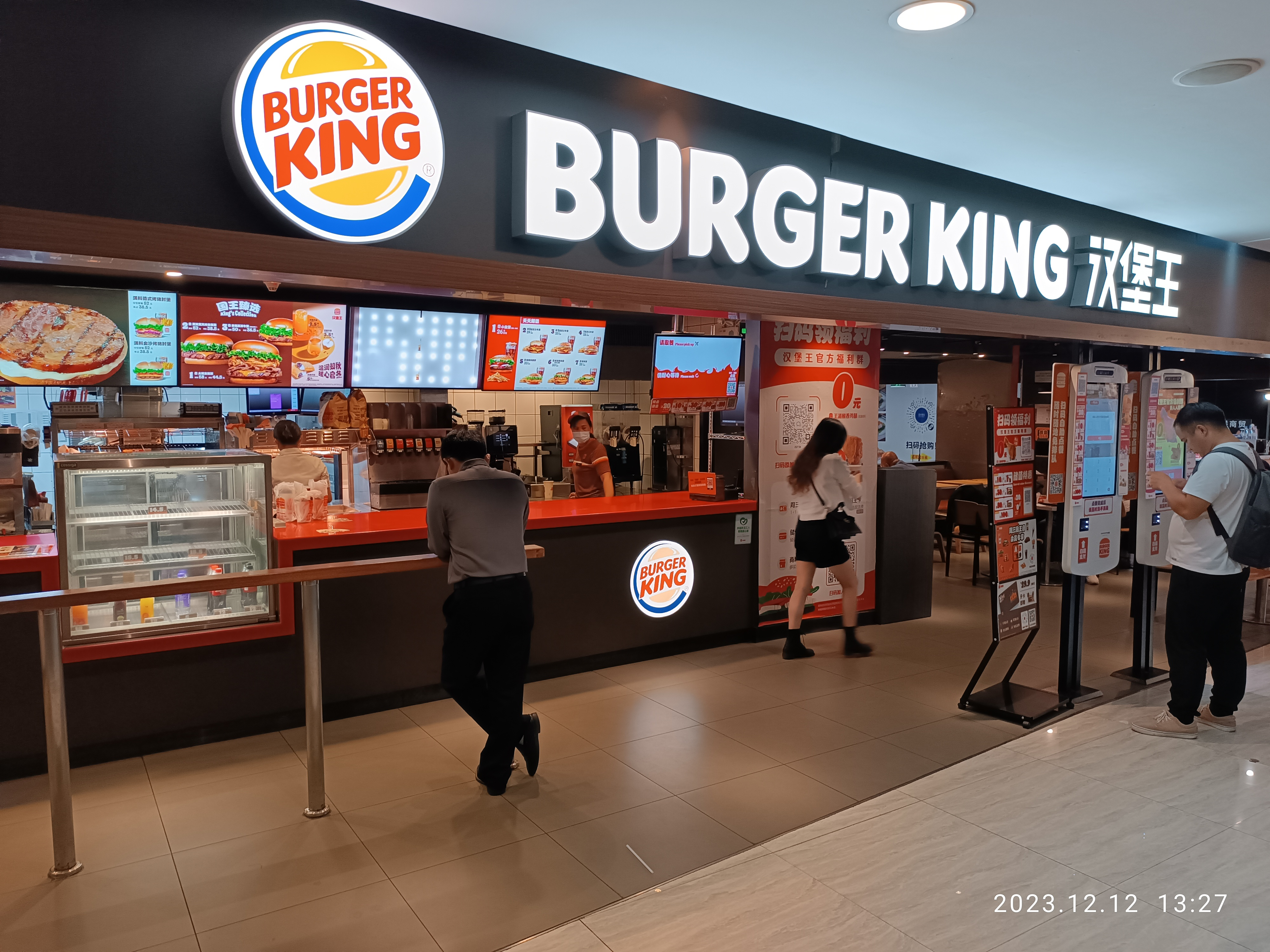
A Burger King restaurant in Shenzhen, China

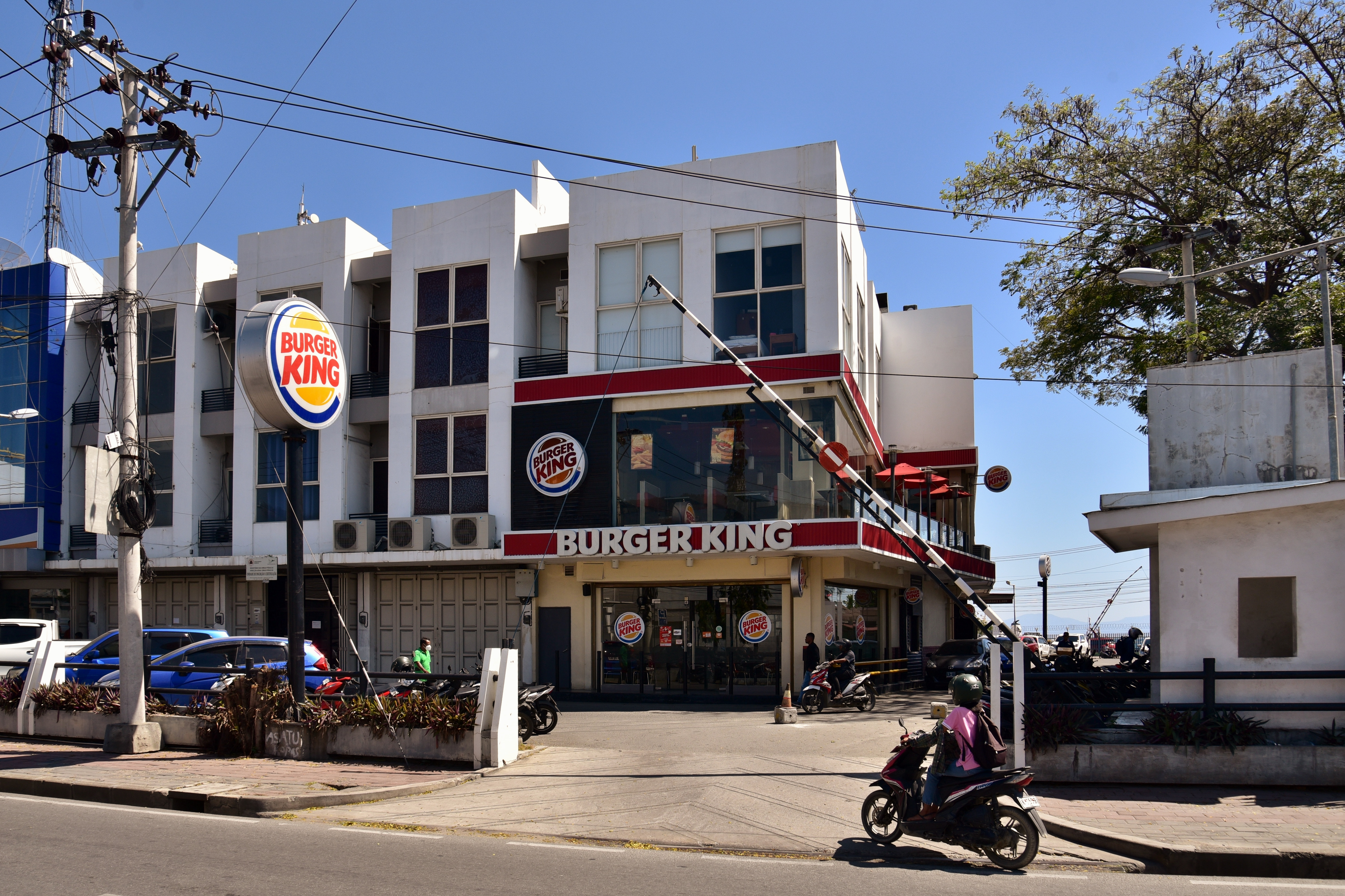
A Burger King restaurant in Dili, East Timor

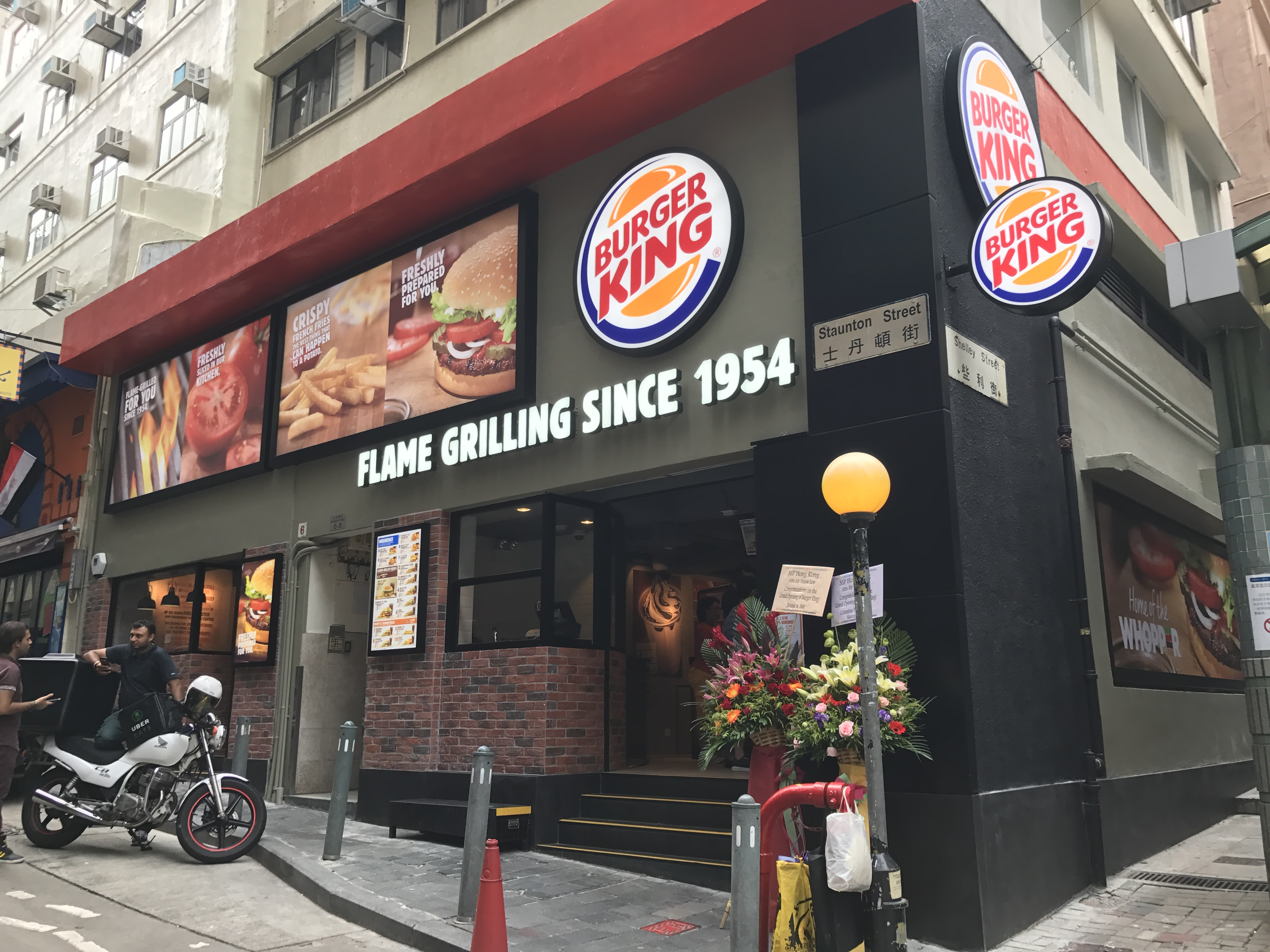
A Burger King restaurant in Hong Kong

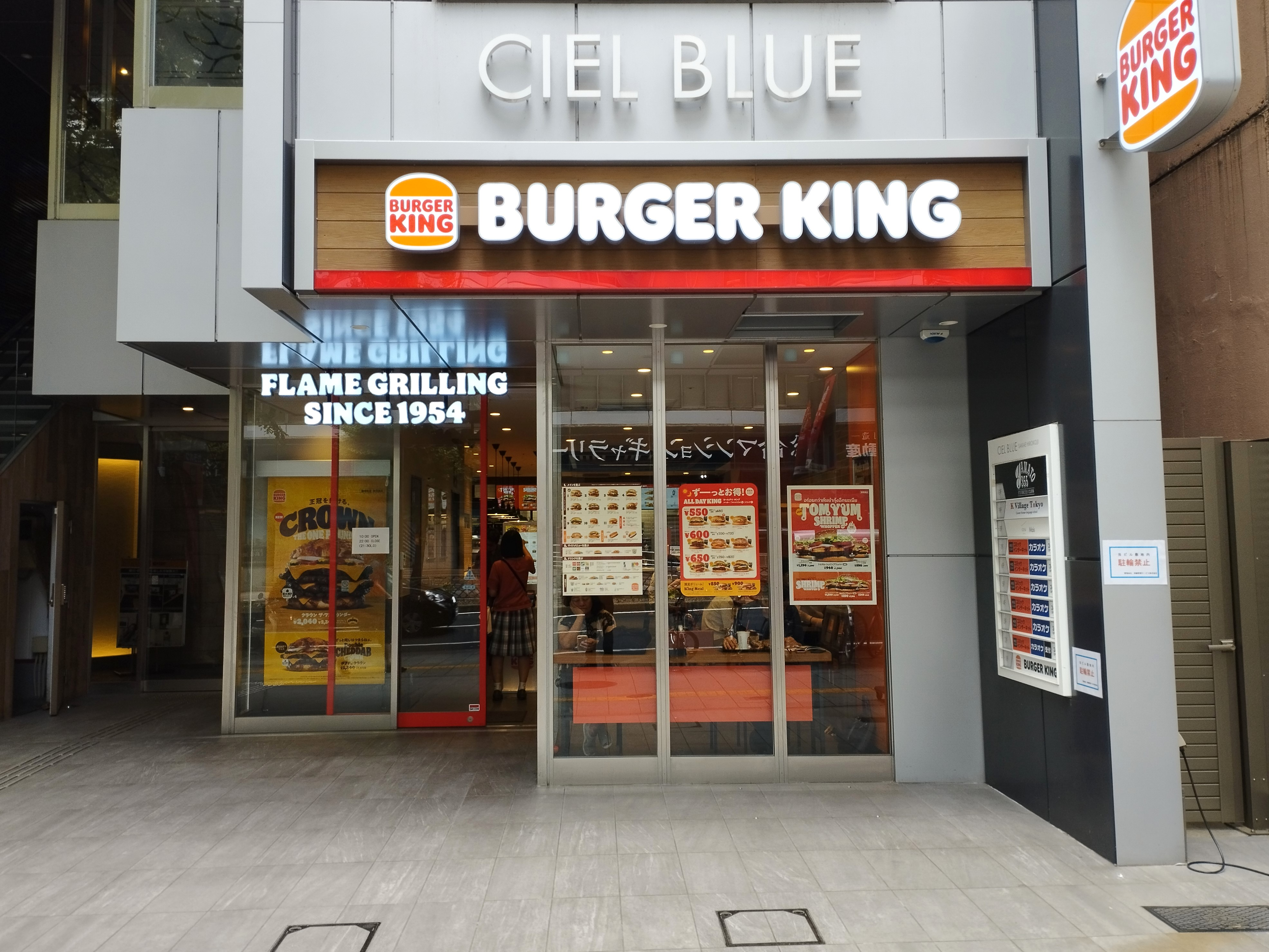
A Burger King restaurant in Sakae, Nagoya, Japan

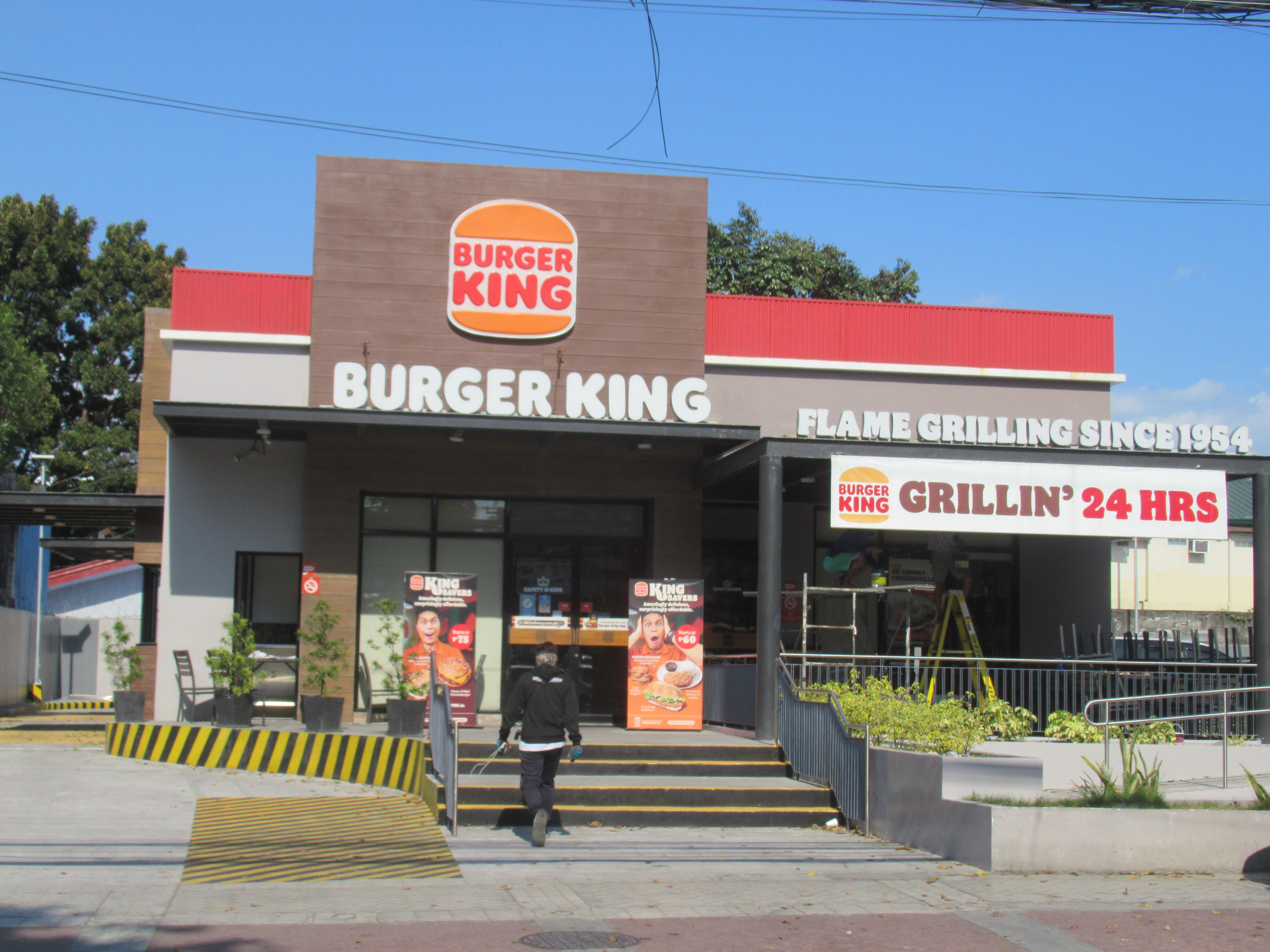
A Burger King restaurant in Quezon City, Philippines

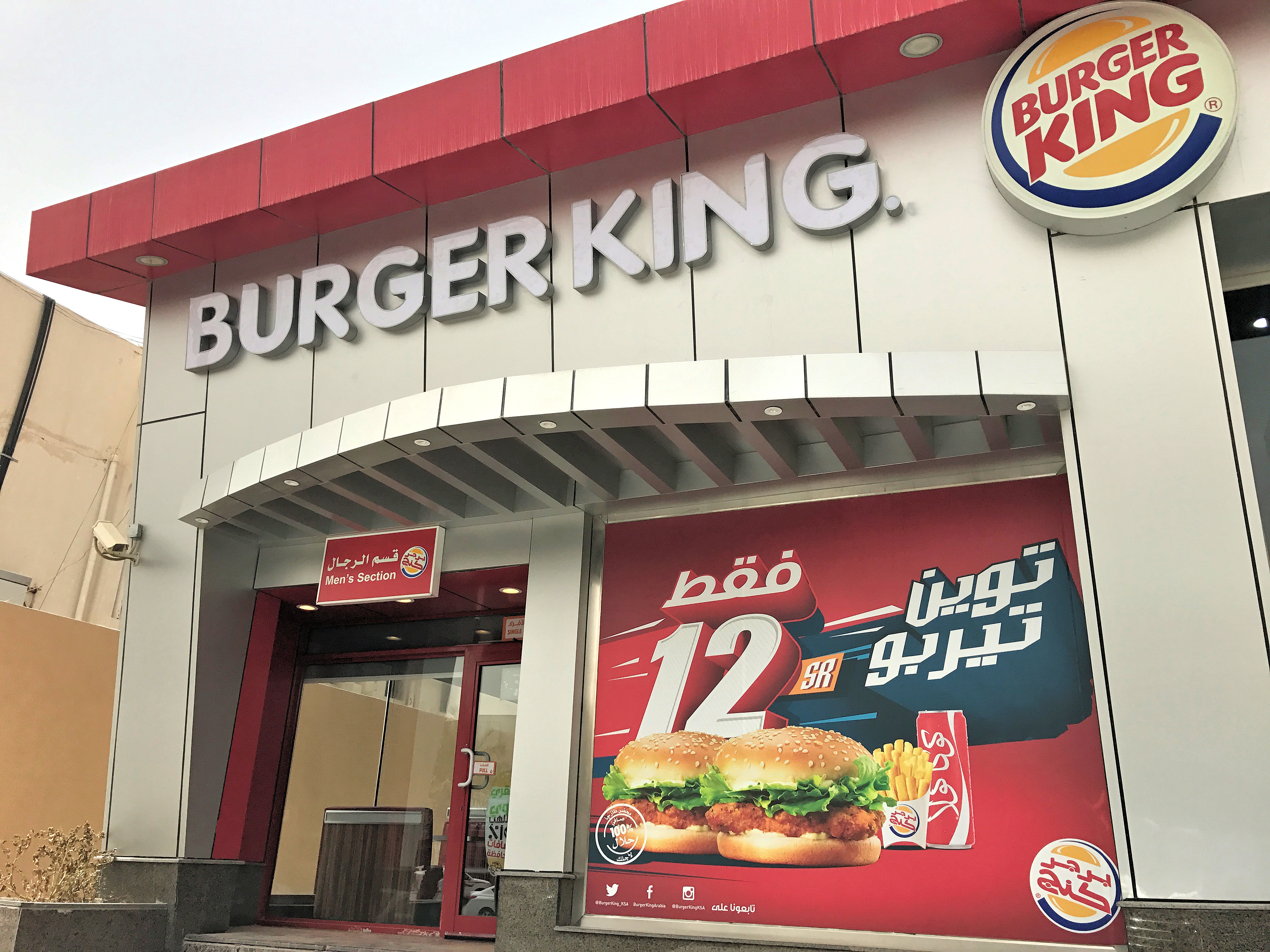
A Burger King restaurant in Riyadh, Saudi Arabia

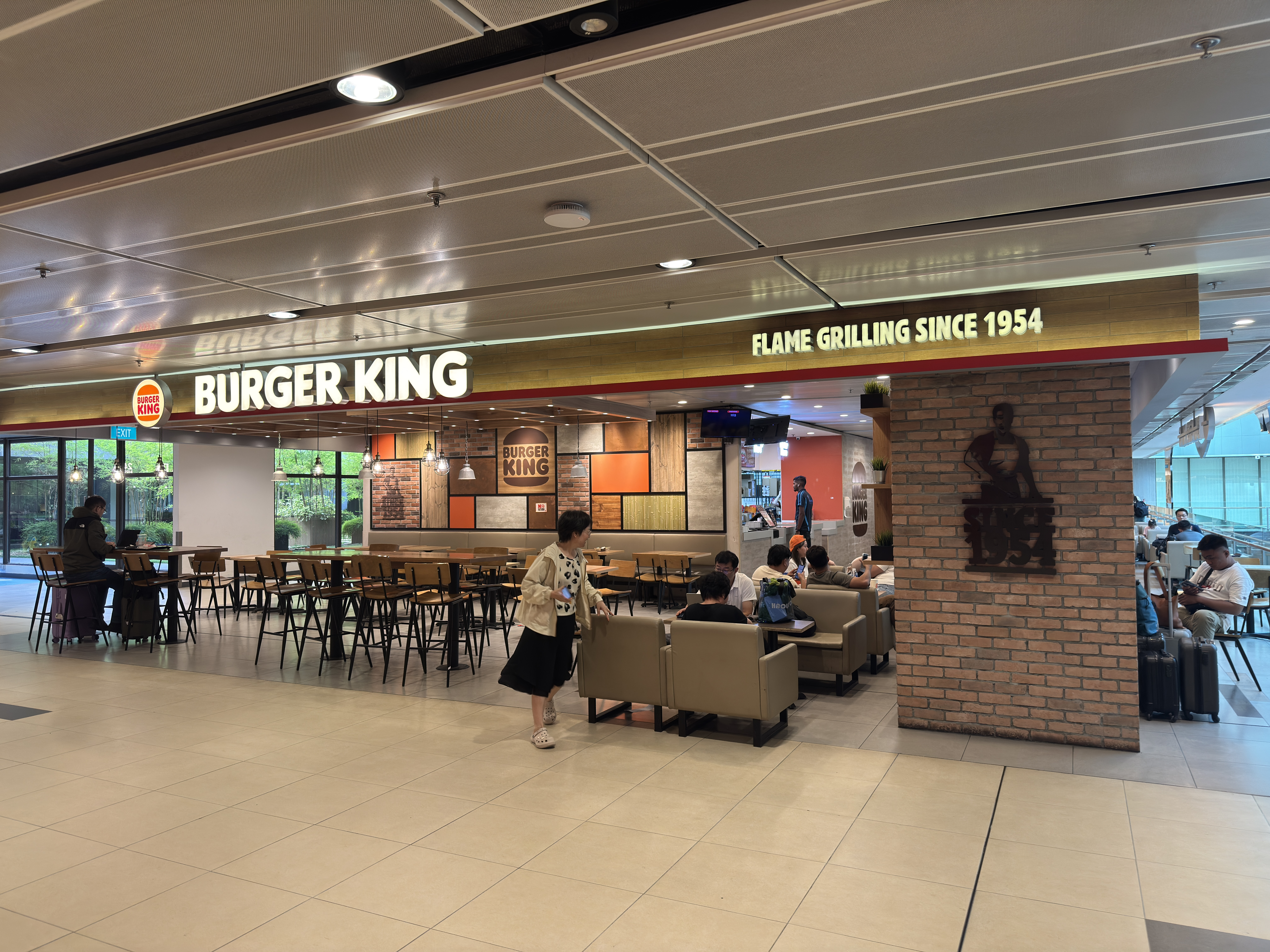
A Burger King restaurant at Changi Airport, Singapore

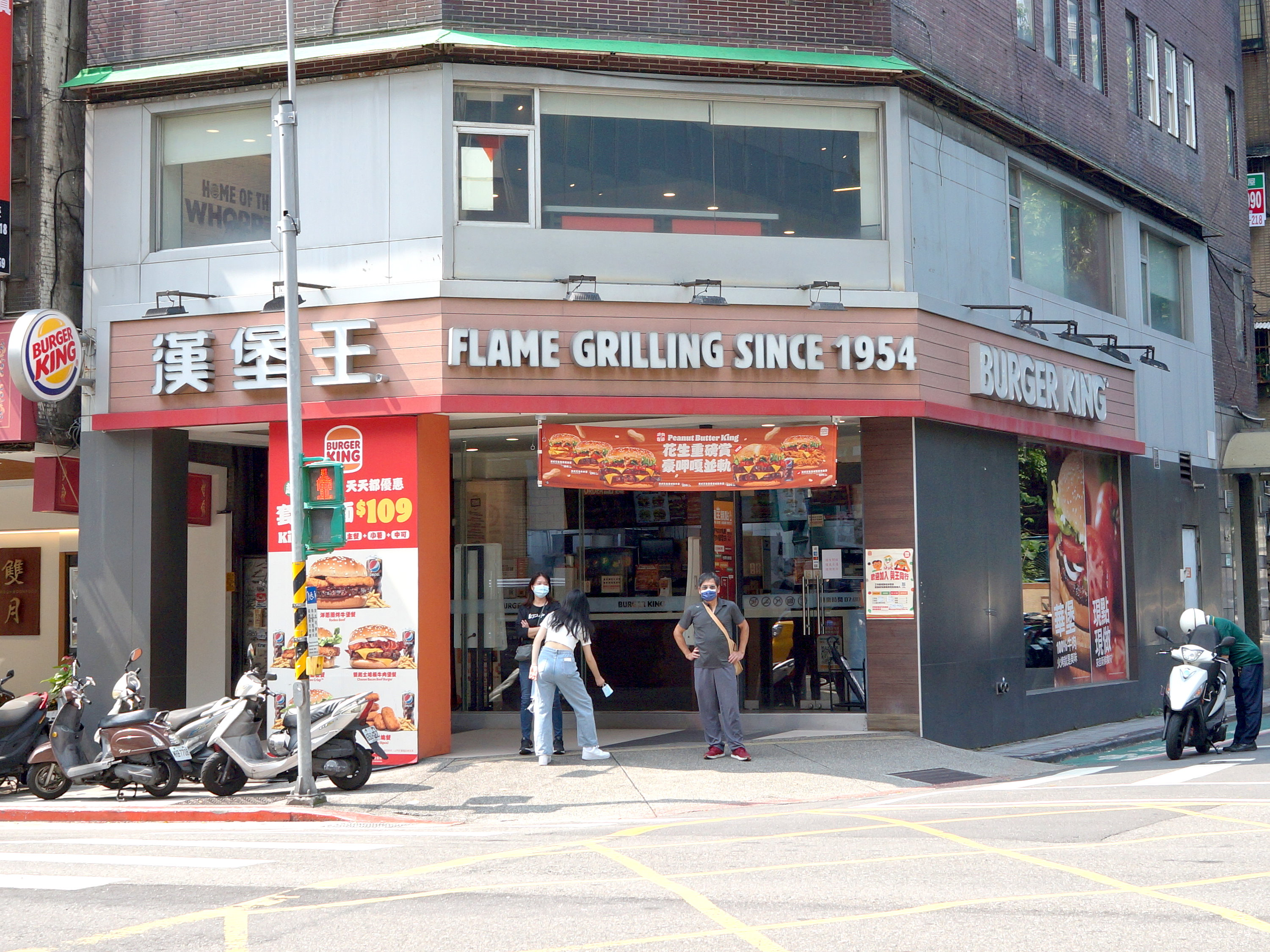
A Burger King restaurant in Taipei, Taiwan

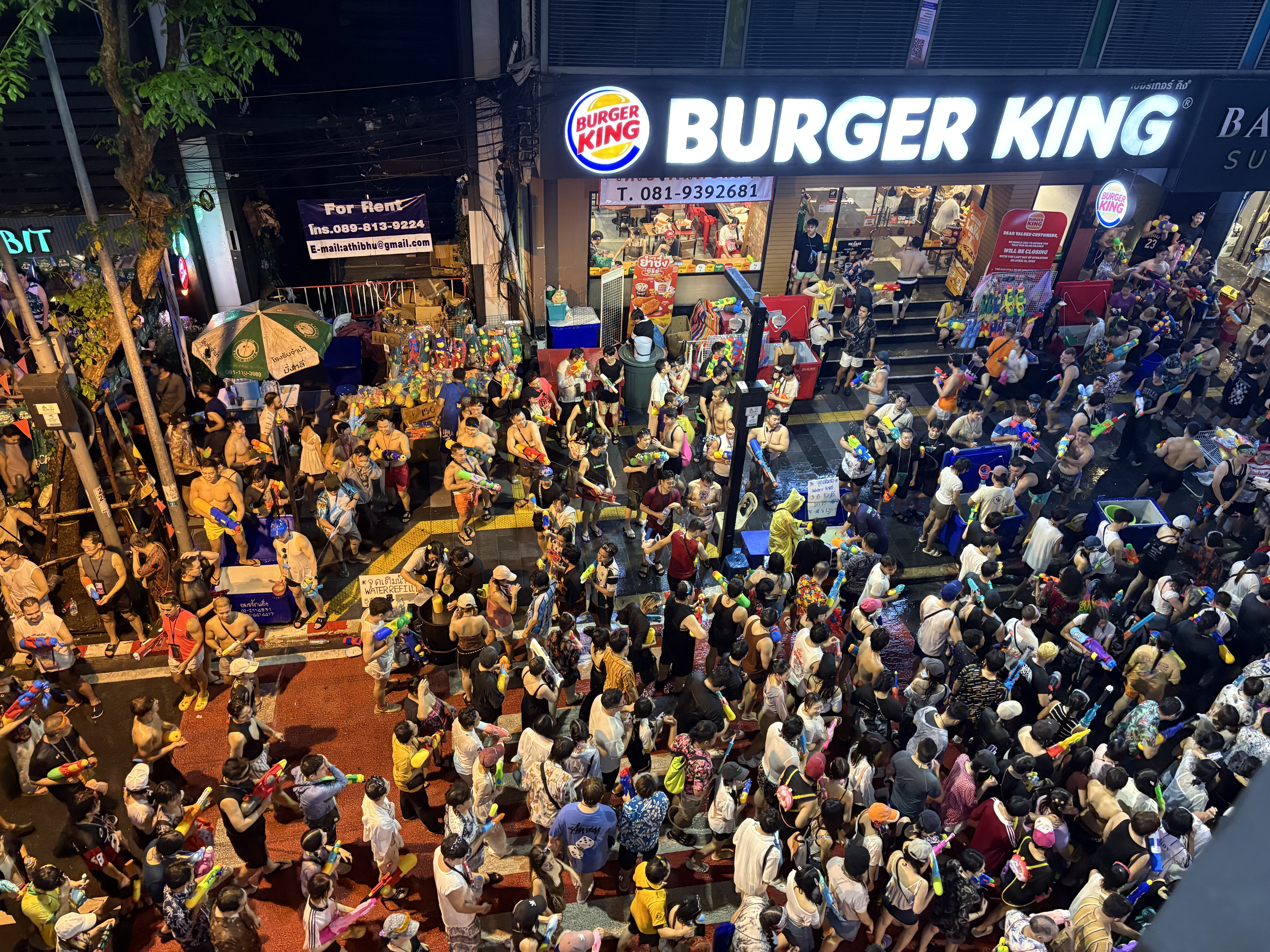
A Burger King restaurant in Bangkok, Thailand, photographed during a Songkran water fight

== Europe ==
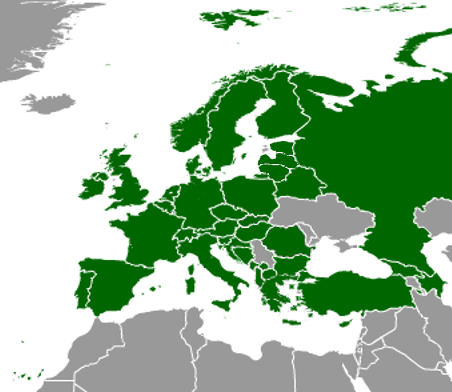
Countries of Europe with Burger Kings

Burger King began its expansion in Europe in 1975 with its first location in Madrid, Spain. The first German branch of Burger King was opened in 1976 at the Kurfürstendamm in West Berlin. In 1990, an East German branch was opened in the town of Dresden.

In December 2012, BK returned to the French market, based on an agreement with multinational operator Autogrill, a move that has met with some excitement in the country. In July 1997, it was announced the chain would be leaving the country, closing its 22 franchised and 17 corporate locations, after a poorly executed entry into the market that left it unable to compete against McDonald's and local chain Quick.

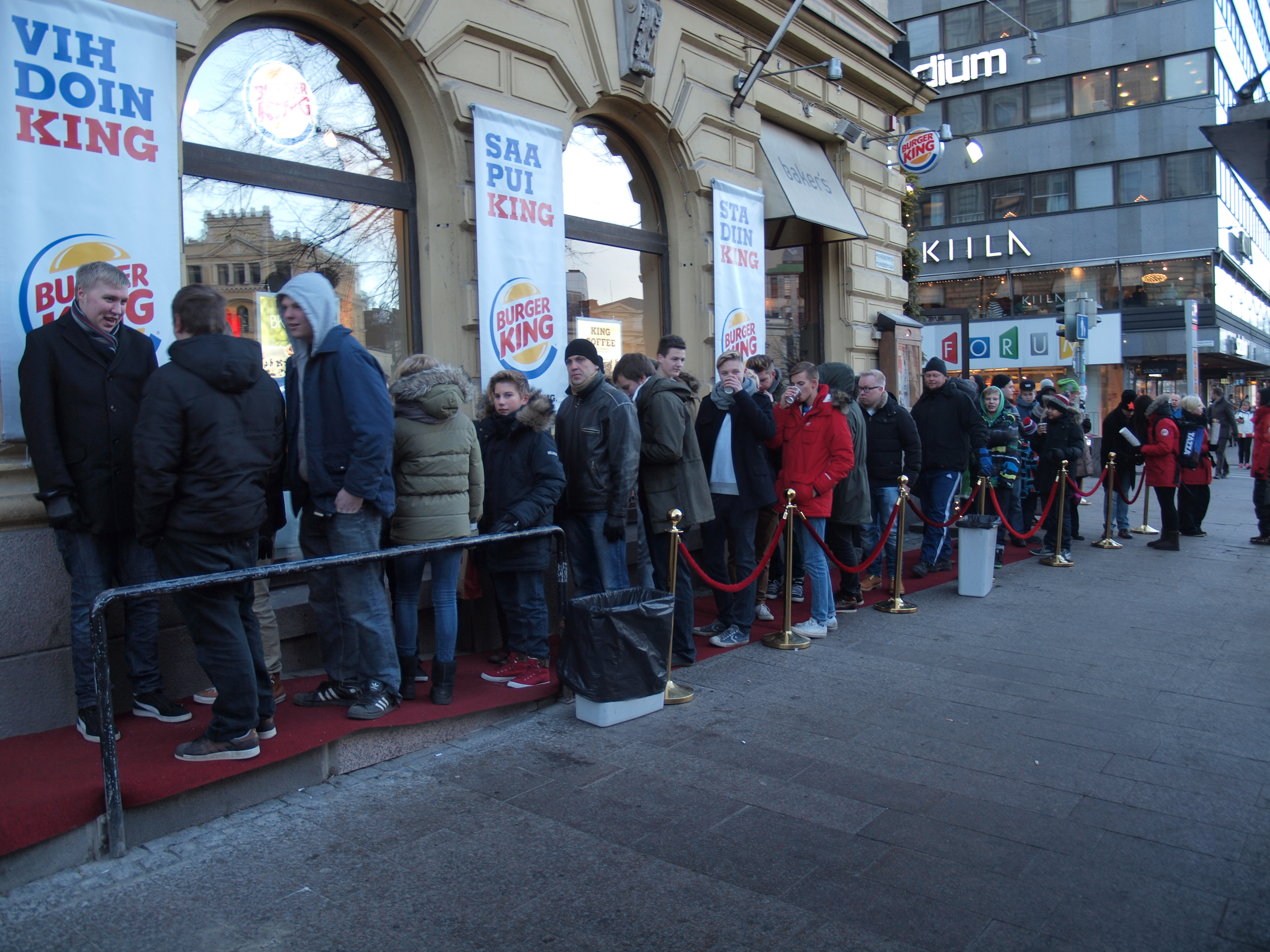
In late 2013, BK returned to Finland after three decades of absence. This caused so much interest that people had to stand in queue for half an hour just to get in.

In November 2013, Groupe Bertrand, who owns several restaurant franchises, acquired the BK master franchise Autogrill, becoming one of their franchisees. In September 2015, Groupe Bertrand announced being in talks with Quick's owner, investment fund Qualium, to take over all the franchise and convert all Quick restaurants in France into BKs.

In December 2013, BK returned to Finland, after three decades of absence. The first restaurant, located on Mannerheimintie in central Helsinki, instantly proved so popular that on every day since its opening, people queued in front of the restaurant to get in, sometimes for over half an hour. The only exception so far has been Christmas time, when the restaurant was closed.

In 2018, BK expanded into Armenia, Azerbaijan, Greece, and the partially unrecognized state Kosovo, as well as re-entering the Slovak market after nearly 7 years of absence under a exclusive license from AmRest. In June 2019, BK opened its doors in Albania after 7 months of hype in the QTU Shopping Mall.

Country/territory	Year entered	No. of restaurants	Master franchisee	Notes
Albania	2019	13	Buçaj Retail	The first outlet opened at the QTU Shopping Mall in early June 2019.
Andorra	1981	4	Restaurant Brands Iberia	
Armenia	2017	5	Burger Arm	Բուրգեր Քինգ (in Armenian). First outlet opened in 2017 at Dalma Garden Mall.
Austria	2000	63	Theophil Group	First outlet opened in Vienna.
Azerbaijan	2017	7	TAB Food Investments	
Belarus	2015	56	Mostra Group	First outlet opened in Minsk on July 9, 2015.
Belgium	2017	62	QSRP (Kharis Capital)	Former Quick restaurants rebranded as BK.
Bosnia and Herzegovina	2023	4	Buçaj Retail	First outlet opened in Sarajevo.
Bulgaria	2008	7	Balkan Foods	
Croatia	2014	8	Kraljevi Restorani	First outlet is located at the Draganić rest area on A1 motorway near Karlovac.
Cyprus	2003	22	WOW Burgers (PHC Franchised Restaurants); TAB Gıda (Northern Cyprus)	Closed in 2012 amid litigation; reopened March 2014 in Paphos; brand present in Northern Cyprus since 2019 via rebranding of Burger City.
Czech Republic	2008	65	Rex Concepts CEE (McWin)	
Denmark	1977	61	King Food	
Estonia	2020	8	Tallink	First 3 restaurants opened in May 2020. These were the first BKs to be opened via Zoom. Two restaurants opened in 2016 and 2022 operate aboard Tallink cruise ships MS Megastar and MyStar, sailing between Tallinn and Helsinki.
Faroe Islands	2002	1	King Food	Opened October 9, 2002 at the SMS shopping centre in Tórshavn.
Finland	1982	73	Restel	First BKs opened in Helsinki and Tampere in 1982, but closed a few years on. Returning to Finland in late 2013, the first new BK was opened in Helsinki on December 13. As of July 2019, there are also two restaurants aboard cruise ships of ferry company Tallink, sailing between Helsinki and Tallinn.
France	1980	617	Bertrand Group	Between 1997 and 2012, Burger King had no permanent presence in France. The brand returned in 2012 with a restaurant at Marseille Provence Airport, which opened on December 22. In 2015, Burger King’s franchisee acquired the French fast-food chain Quick and began converting most of its restaurants into Burger King outlets.
Georgia	2013	5	TAB Gıda	ბურგერ კინგი (in Georgian)
Germany	1976	757	Burger King Deutschland (McWin)	First BK Whopper Bar in Europe (Munich).
Gibraltar	1993	1	Restaurants Brands Iberia	First and only operational outlet is located at Casemates Square.
Greece	1997	6	SSP Group	First outlet opened at the airport of Rhodes, followed by the second at Athens' airport. The next opened at Thessaloniki, Corfu, Zante, and Kos airports. The first BK outlet outside an airport opened in January 2026 in Chalandri district, Athens.
Hungary	1991	63	Fusion Group	First outlet opened in Budapest.
Ireland	1981	50	OKR Group	
Italy	1999	315	QSRP (Kharis Capital)	First outlet opened in Milan.
Kosovo	2018	16	Buçaj Retail	First outlet opened at Albi Mall, Pristina in early December 2018.
Latvia	2020	6	Tallink	First outlet opened at Akropolis shopping center in Riga on December 4, 2020.
Lithuania	2020	6	Tallink	First outlet opened at Akropolis shopping center in Vilnius on December 11, 2020.
Luxembourg	2017	13	QSRP (Kharis Capital)	Former Quick restaurants rebranded as BK.
Malta	1995	8	Food Chain (Quinco Holdings)	First Outlet opened in June 1995 in Valletta Repubblic Street.
Montenegro	2022	7	Buçaj Retail	First BK restaurant opened on December 26, 2022 in the capital of Podgorica.
Netherlands	1981	68	BKNL B.V. (Standard Investment)	
North Macedonia	2011	9	TAB Gıda	First BK opened in August 2011, located at the Skopje airport.
Norway	1988	118	King Food	
Poland	1992	78	Rex Concepts CEE (McWin)	Originally operated from 1992 to 2001; re-entered the market in 2007.
Portugal	2001	214	Restaurant Brands Iberia	
Romania	2008	47	Rex Concepts CEE (McWin)	Burger King expanded again in Romania in 2019 with new restaurants in Bucharest, after operating a single location at Otopeni Airport since 2008.
Russia	2010	920	Burger Rus LLC (BKR ICLLC)	Бургер Кинг (in Russian). First Russian outlet opened in Moscow on 21 January 2010. Following the 2022 Russian invasion of Ukraine and the start of the Russo-Ukrainian war, parent company RBI suspended corporate support, marketing, and supply chain operations. The local operator refused to close the restaurants, which remained fully operational. In September 2025, the holding company redomiciled from Cyprus to Russia as BKR ICLLC, with its current ownership structure undisclosed.
Serbia	2026	2	Nomberg Management GmbH	The first two restaurants are scheduled to open in Belgrade during the autumn of 2026. On November 12, 2026, the first restaurant opened in the Ušće Shopping Center.
Slovakia	2010	8	–	The first restaurant opened in March 2010 under Tekaz and closed in December 2011 following its bankruptcy. In 2018, AmRest obtained the master franchise rights for Burger King in Slovakia and opened its first restaurant in the country on 23 November. Burger King terminated its franchising contract with AmRest, which means no new Burger King restaurants would be opened.
Slovenia	2011	1	Lagardère Travel Retail	Closed in 2020. New location in Logatec opened in 2025.
Spain	1975	998	Restaurant Brands Iberia	First ever BK in Europe opened in Madrid. Largest burger chain in Spain, the country with the most numerous BK's in Europe.
Sweden	1976	113	King Food	The first store in Sweden opened on Gustav Adolfs torg, Malmö, it remains open to this day.
Switzerland	1981	92	QR Group	The first Burger King restaurant in Switzerland opened in Lugano. By May 2017, the chain had expanded in the country, including the first Burger King Express in Europe.
Turkey	1995	803	TAB Gıda	BK was introduced into Turkey in 1995. Permissible for Muslims.
United Kingdom	1976	574	BKUK GROUP LIMITED	The first outlet was located on Coventry Street in Central London.

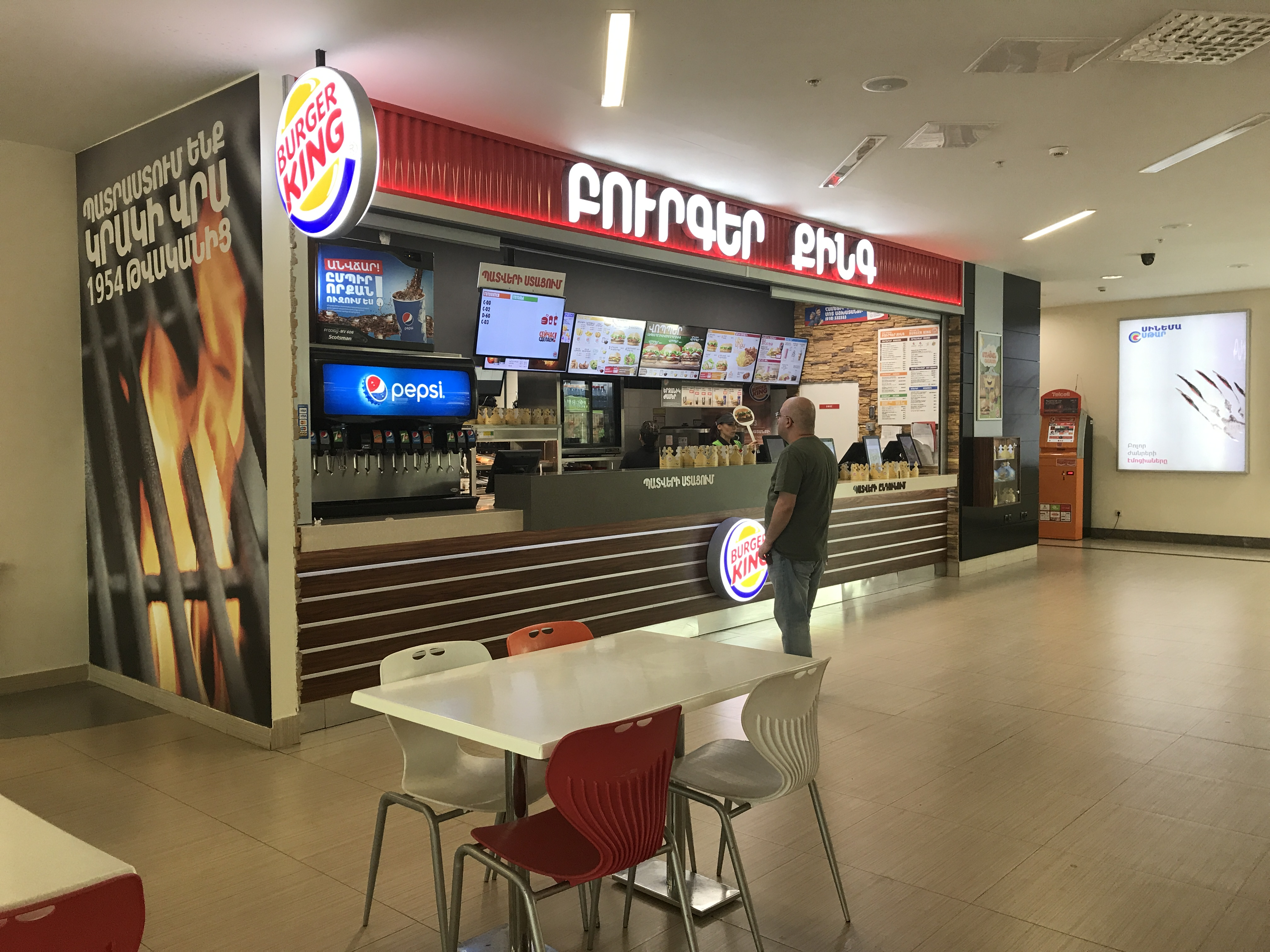
Burger King's first outlet in Armenia, located at Dalma Garden Mall

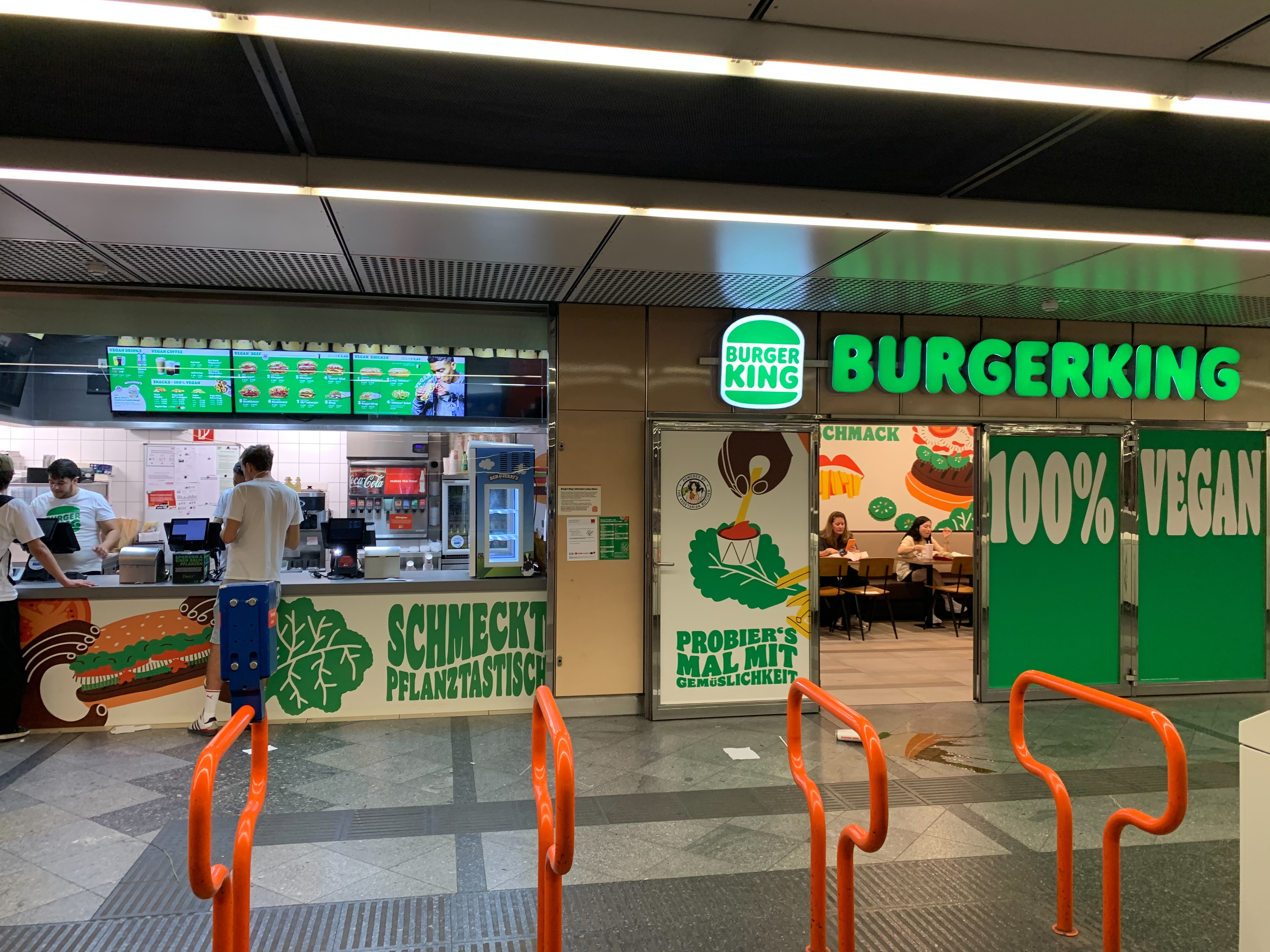
A vegan Burger King restaurant in Vienna, Austria

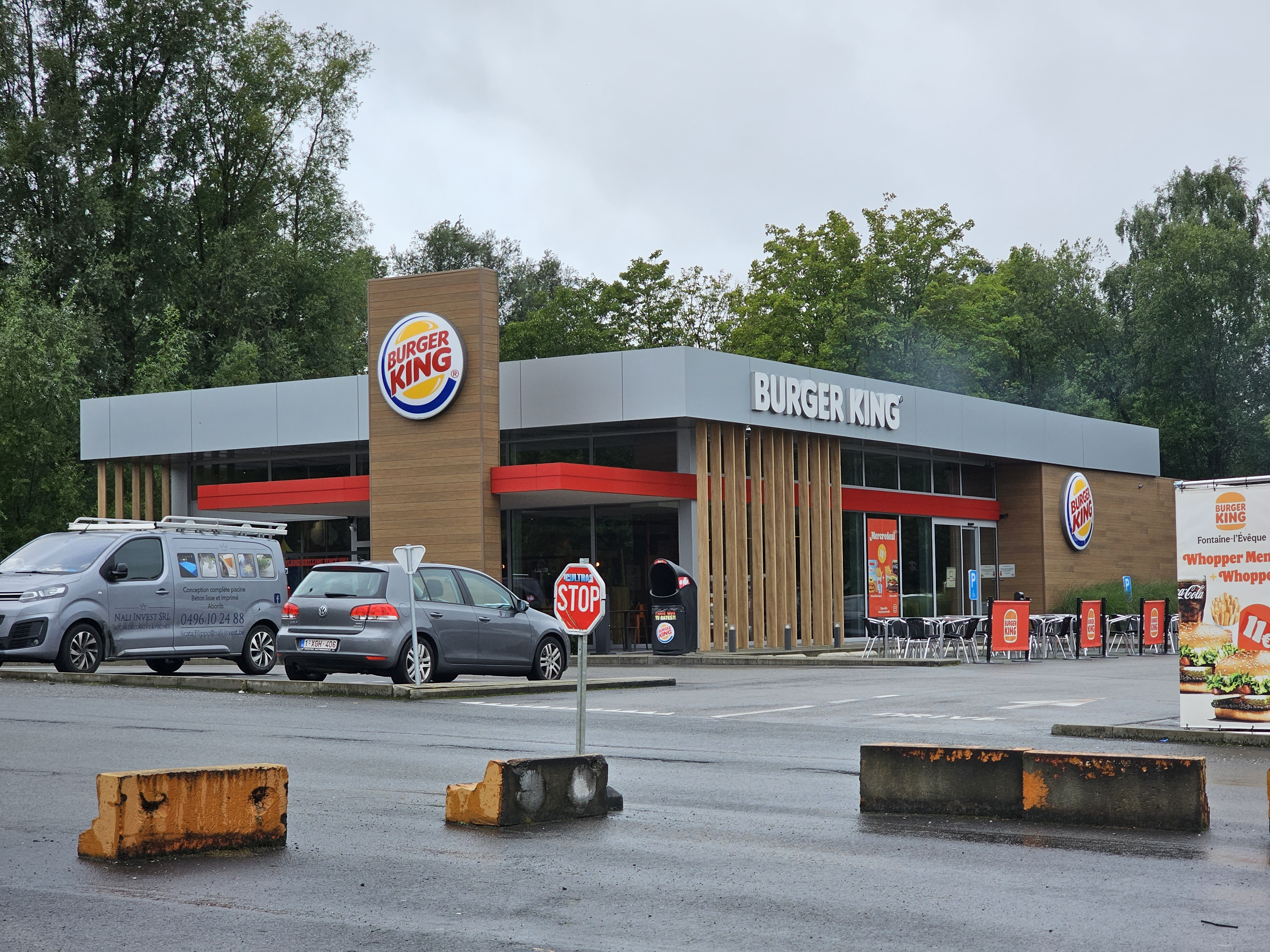
A Burger King restaurant in Fontaine-l'Évêque, Belgium

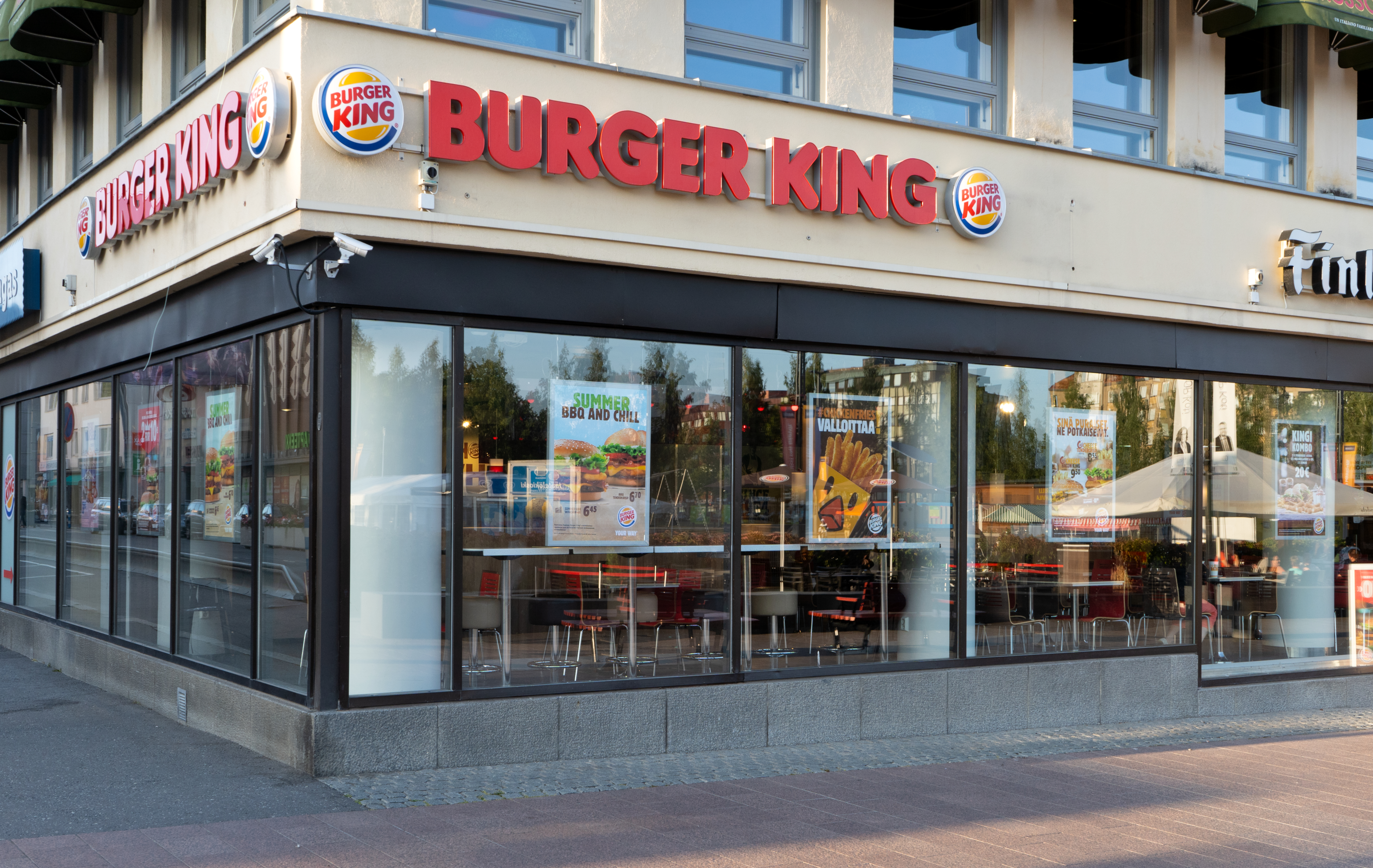
A Burger King restaurant in Mikkeli, Finland

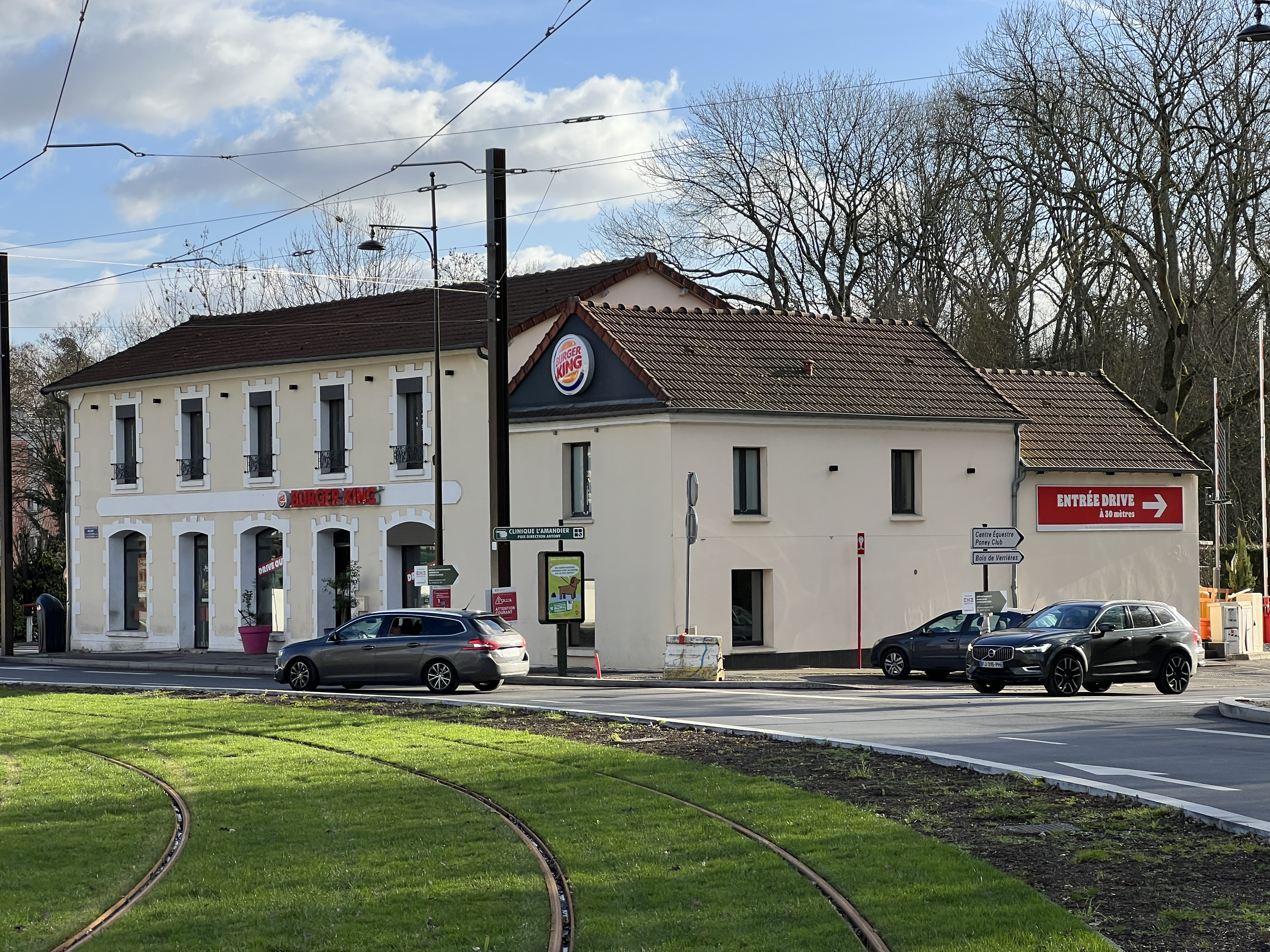
A Burger King restaurant in Châtenay-Malabry, France

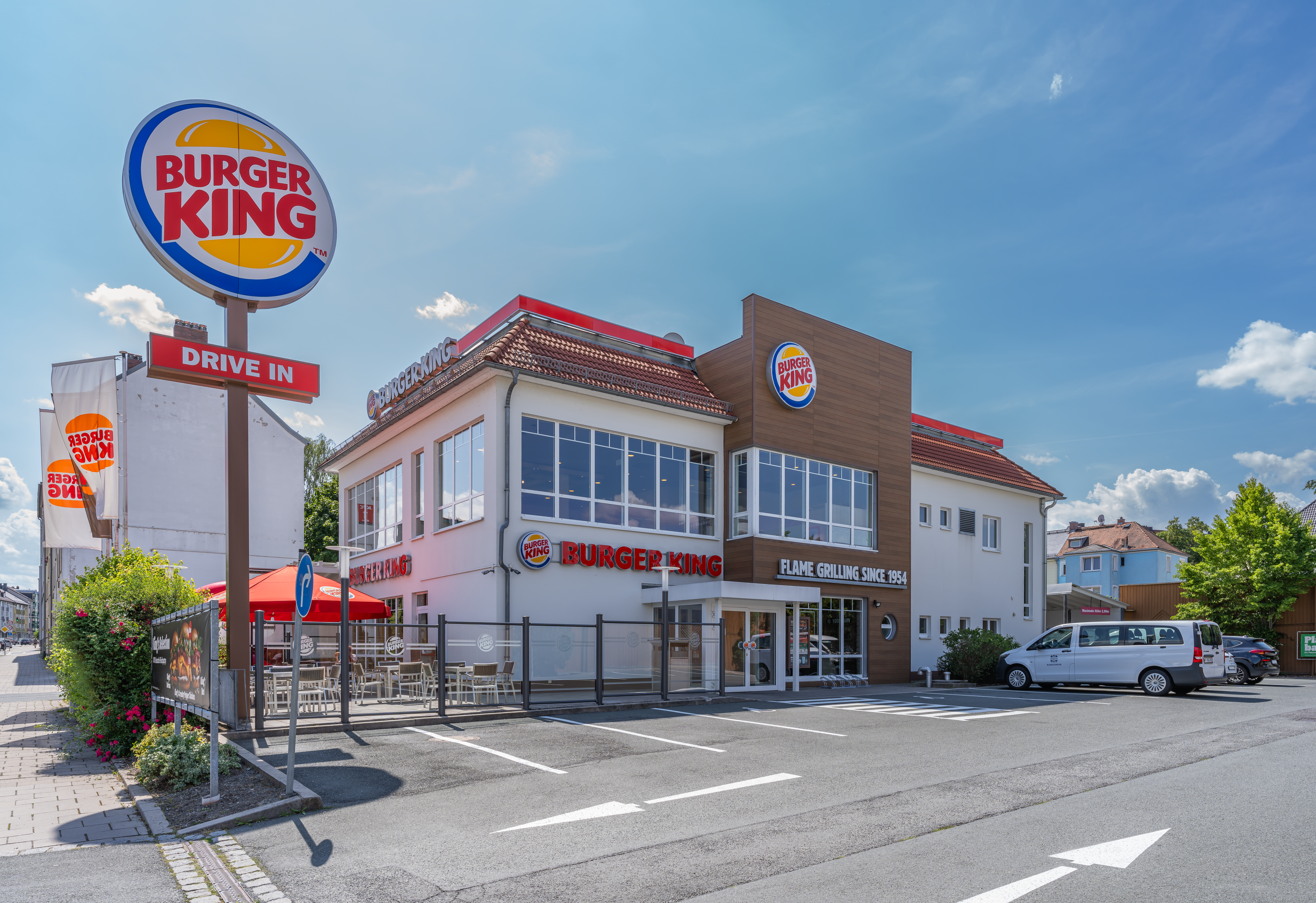
A Burger King restaurant in Bavaria, Germany

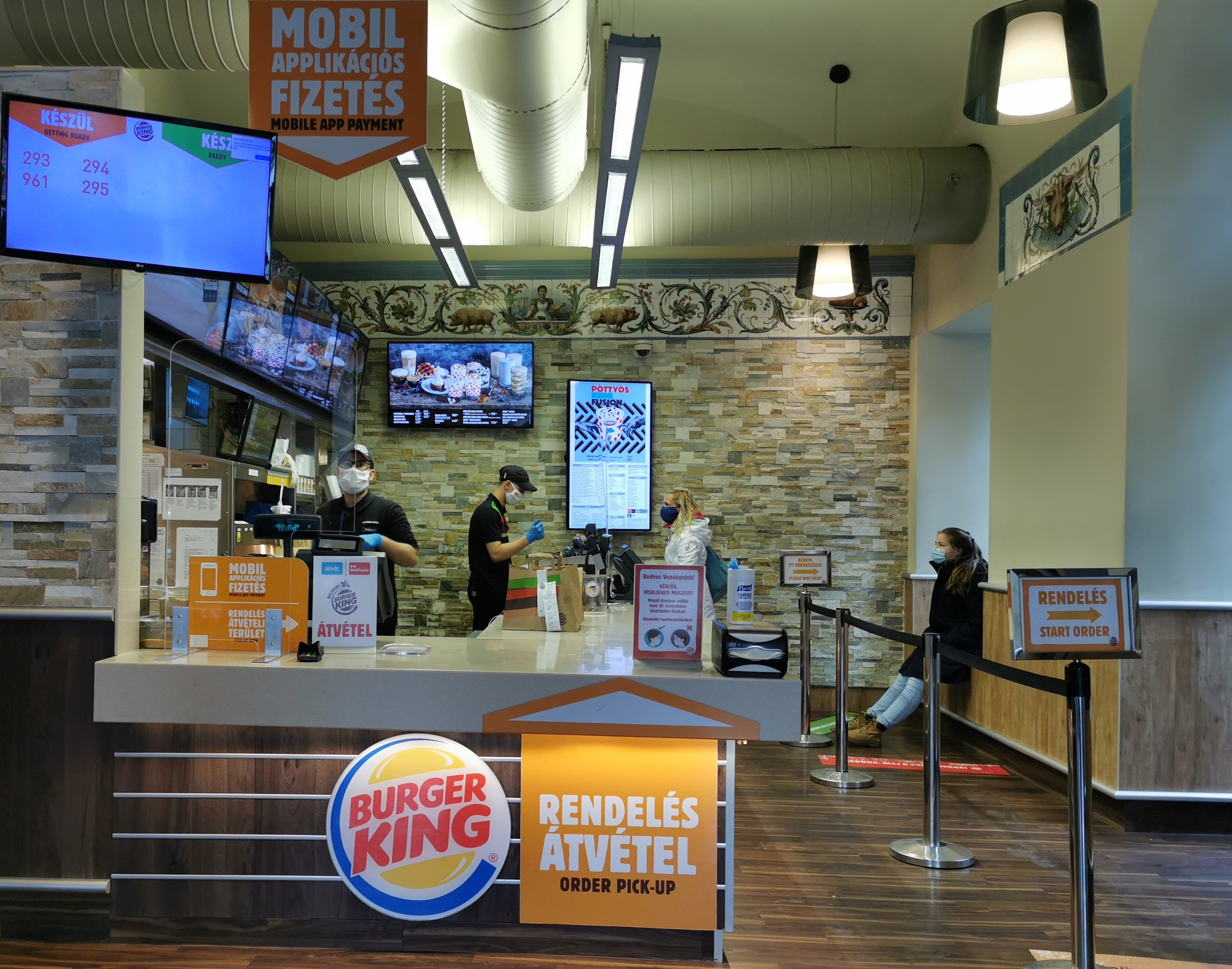
Inside a Burger King restaurant in Budapest, Hungary

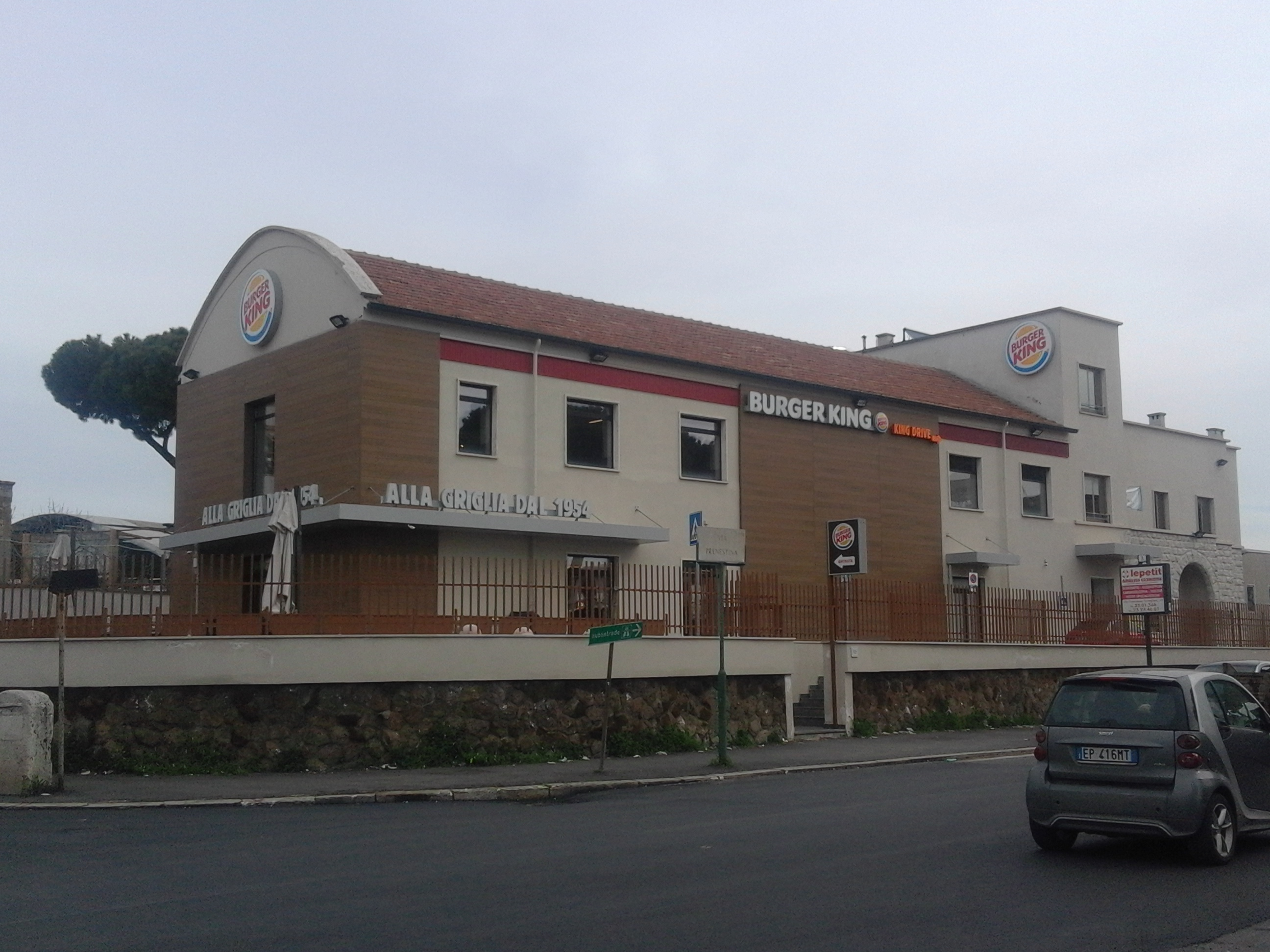
A Burger King restaurant in Rome, Italy

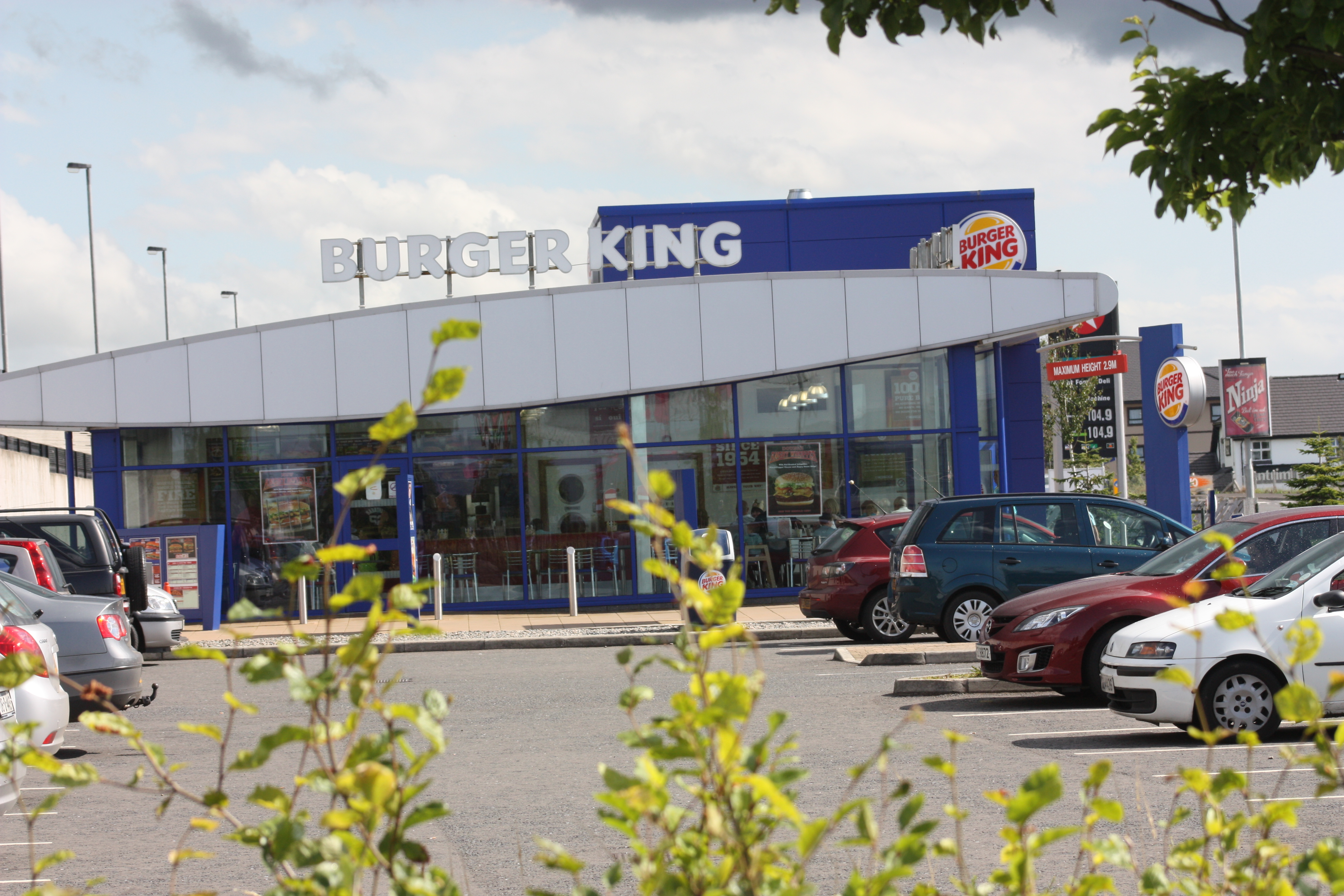
Burger King restaurant beside Junction One Retail Park, Antrim, County Antrim, Northern Ireland

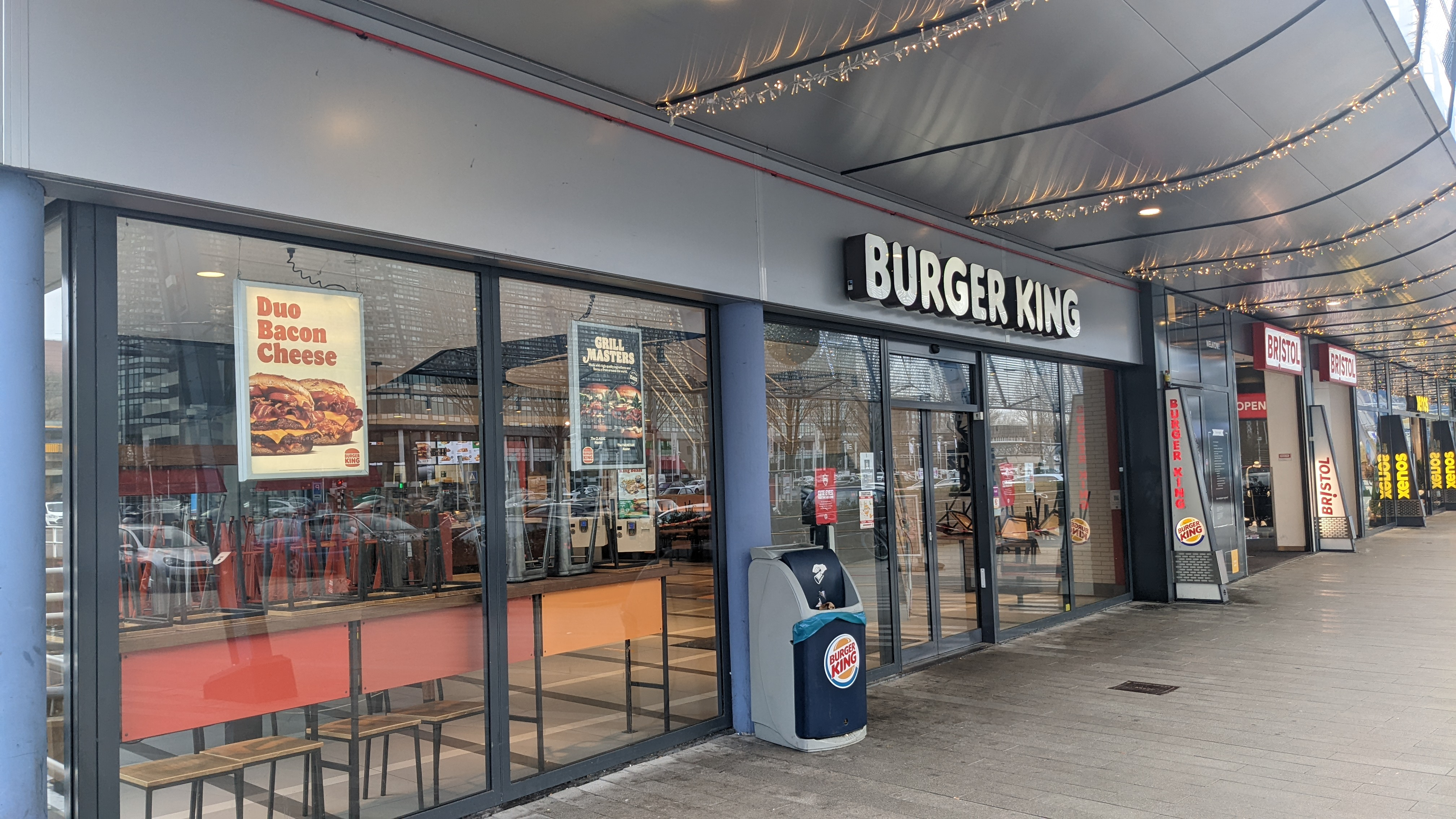
A Burger King restaurant in Rotterdam, Netherlands

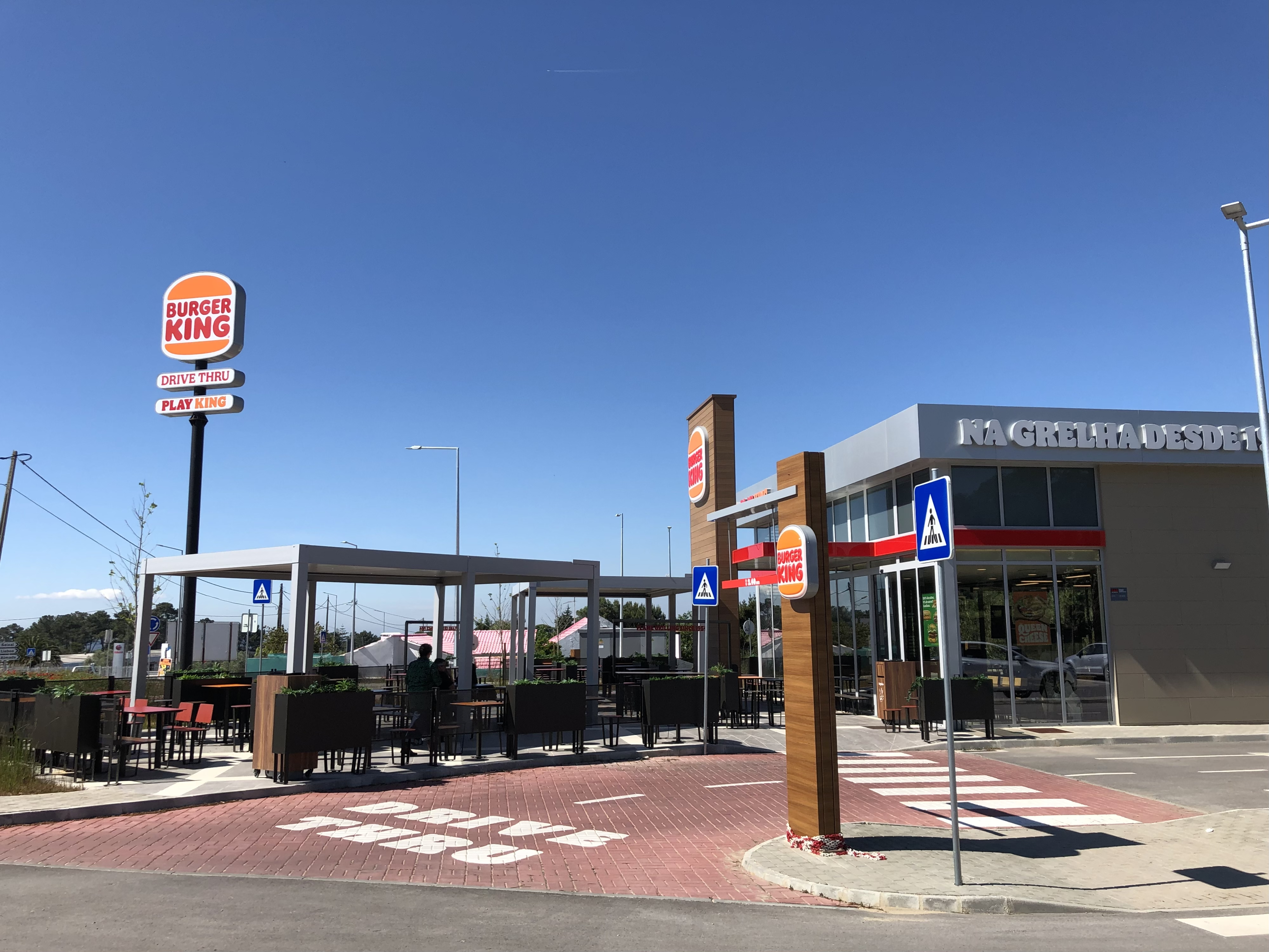
A Burger King restaurant in Sesimbra, Portugal

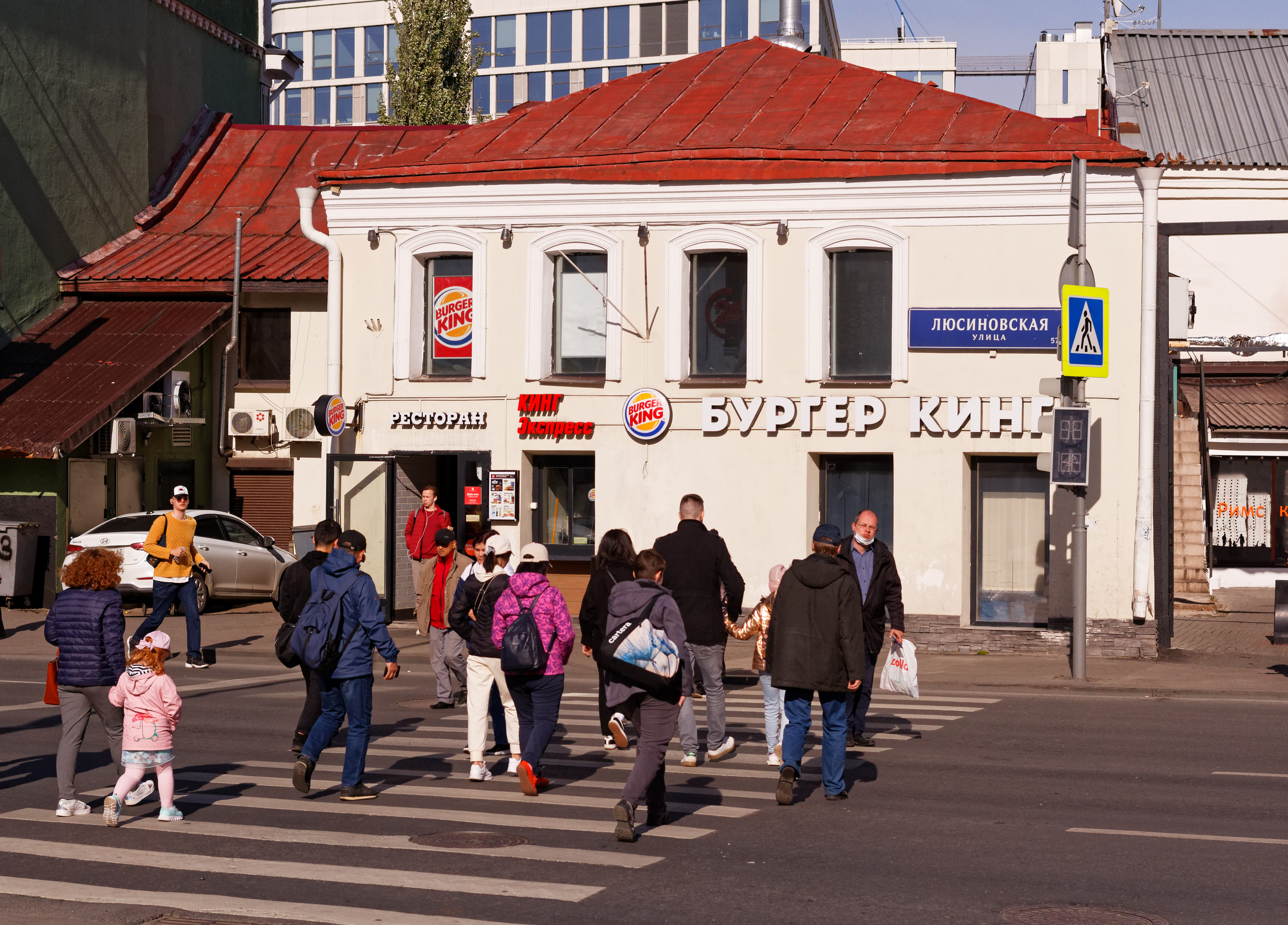
A Burger King restaurant in Moscow, Russia

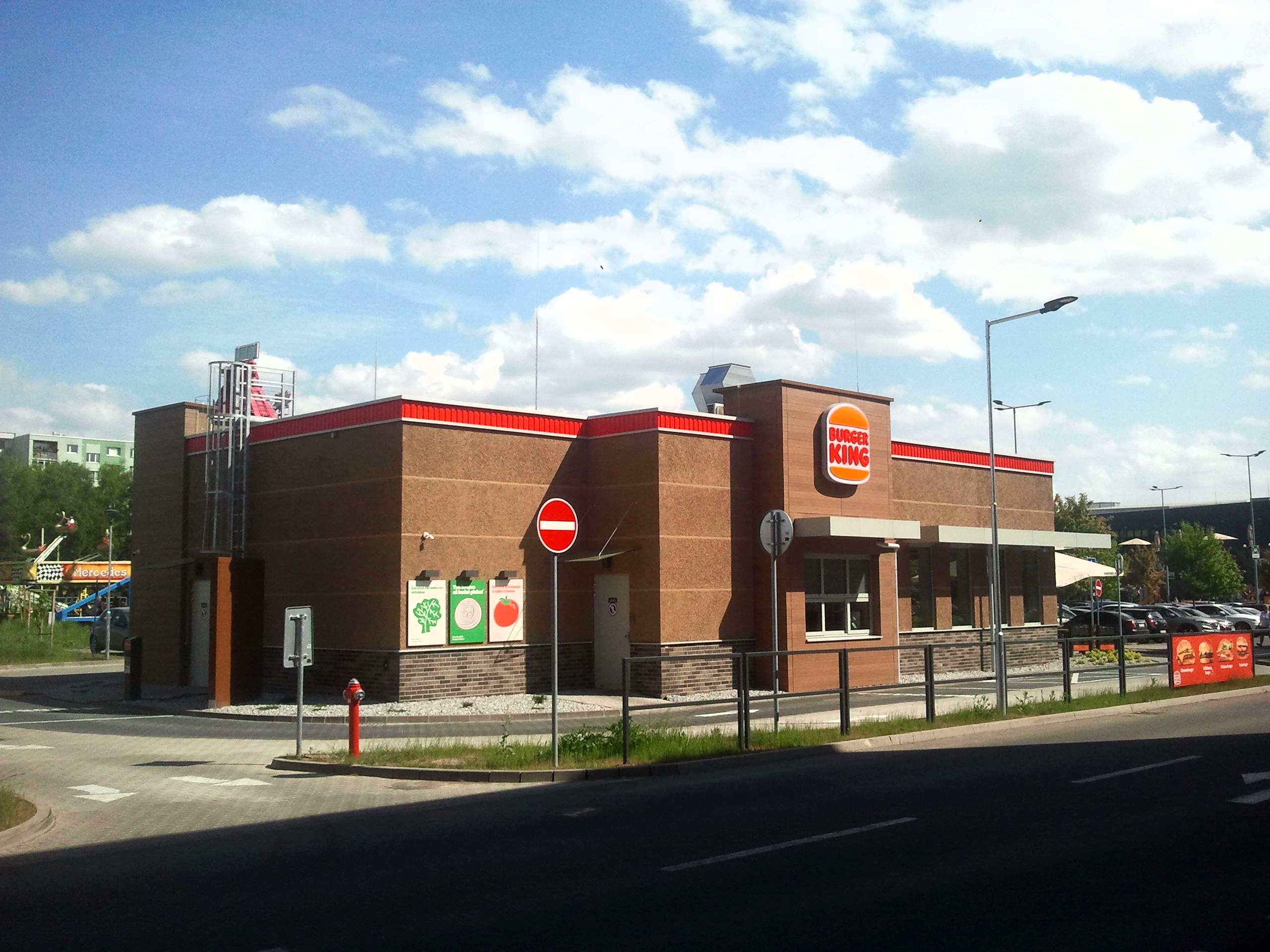
A Burger King restaurant in Prešov, Slovakia

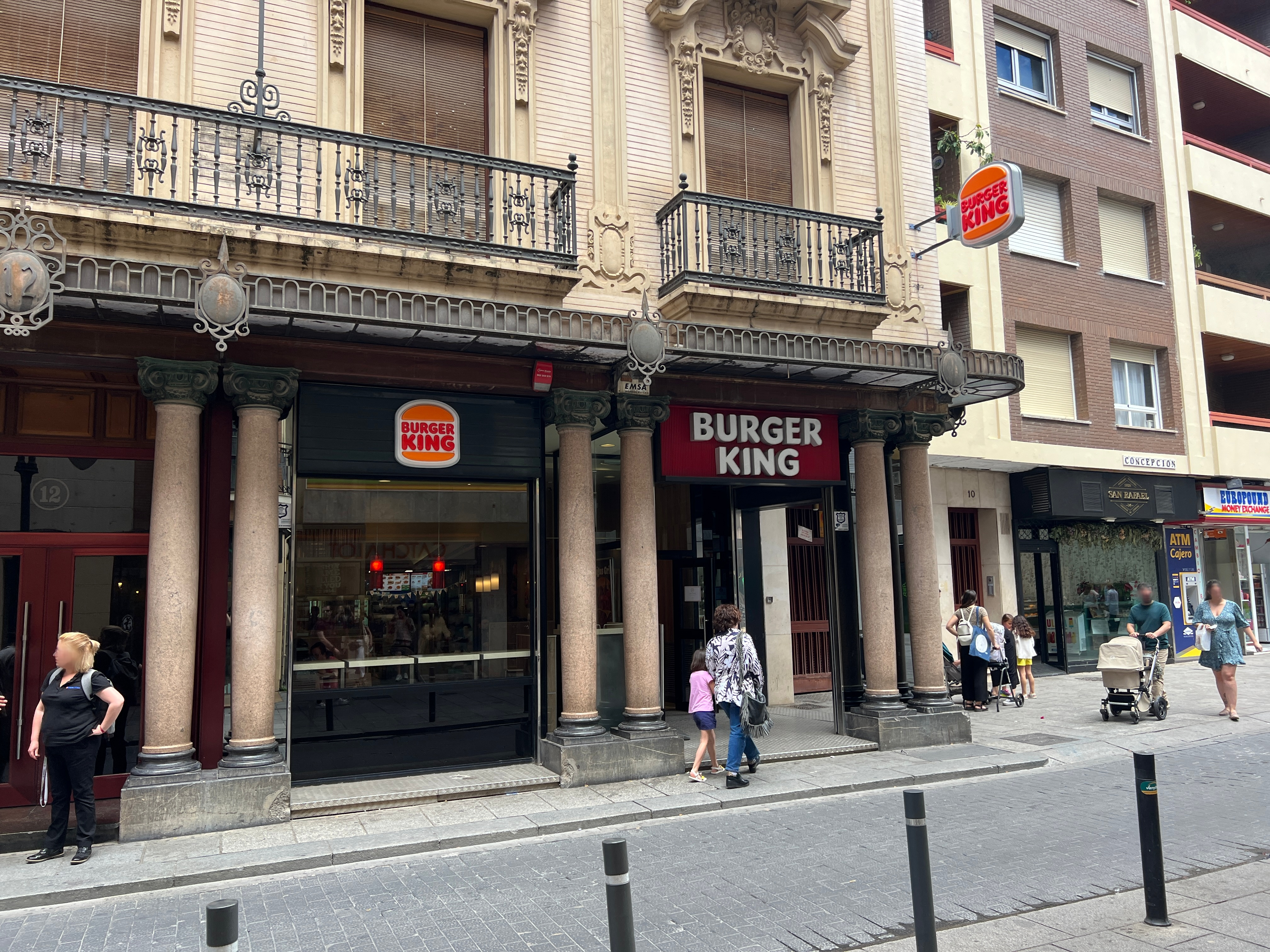
A Burger King restaurant in Córdoba, Spain

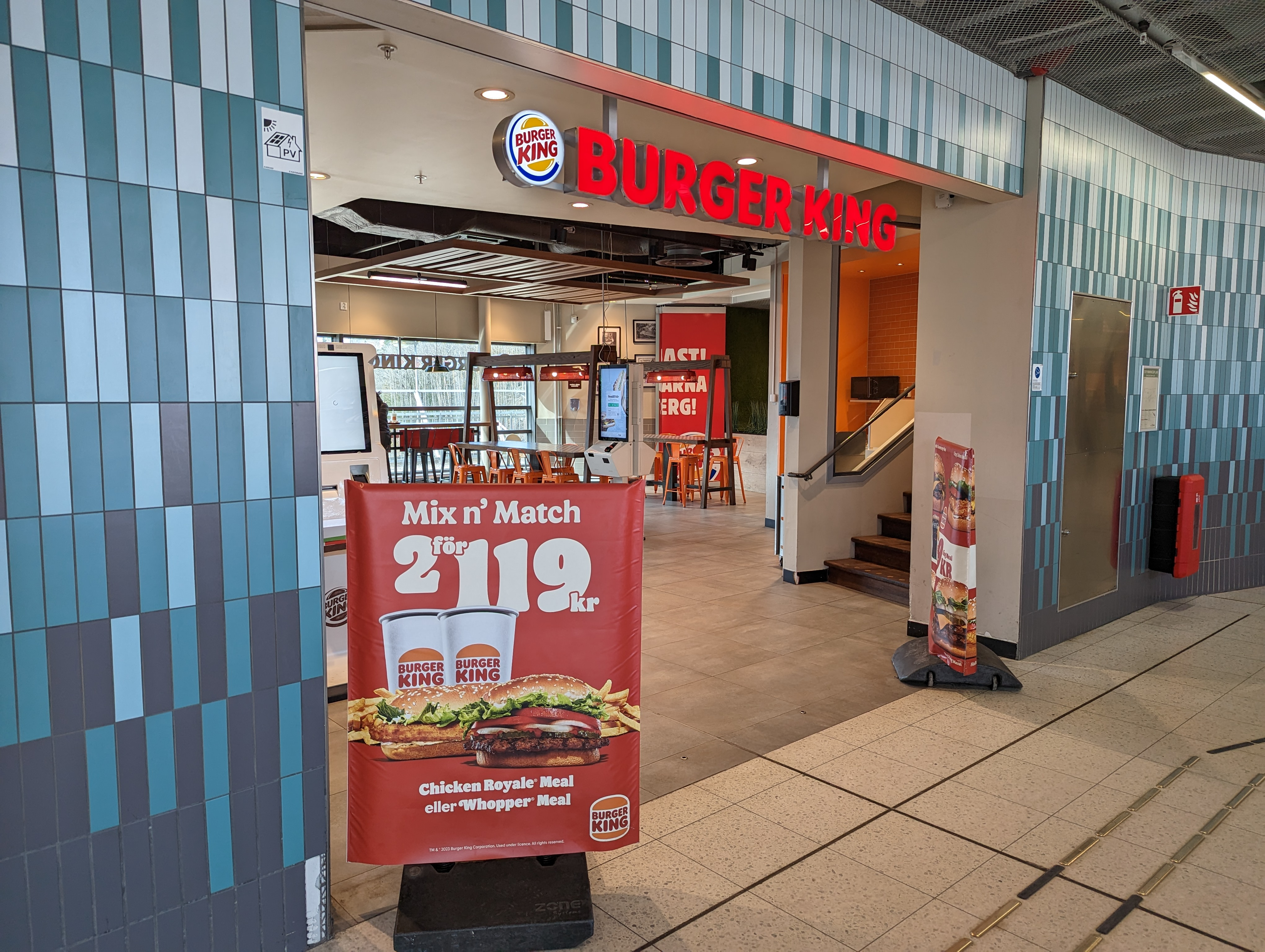
A Burger King restaurant in Huddinge, Sweden

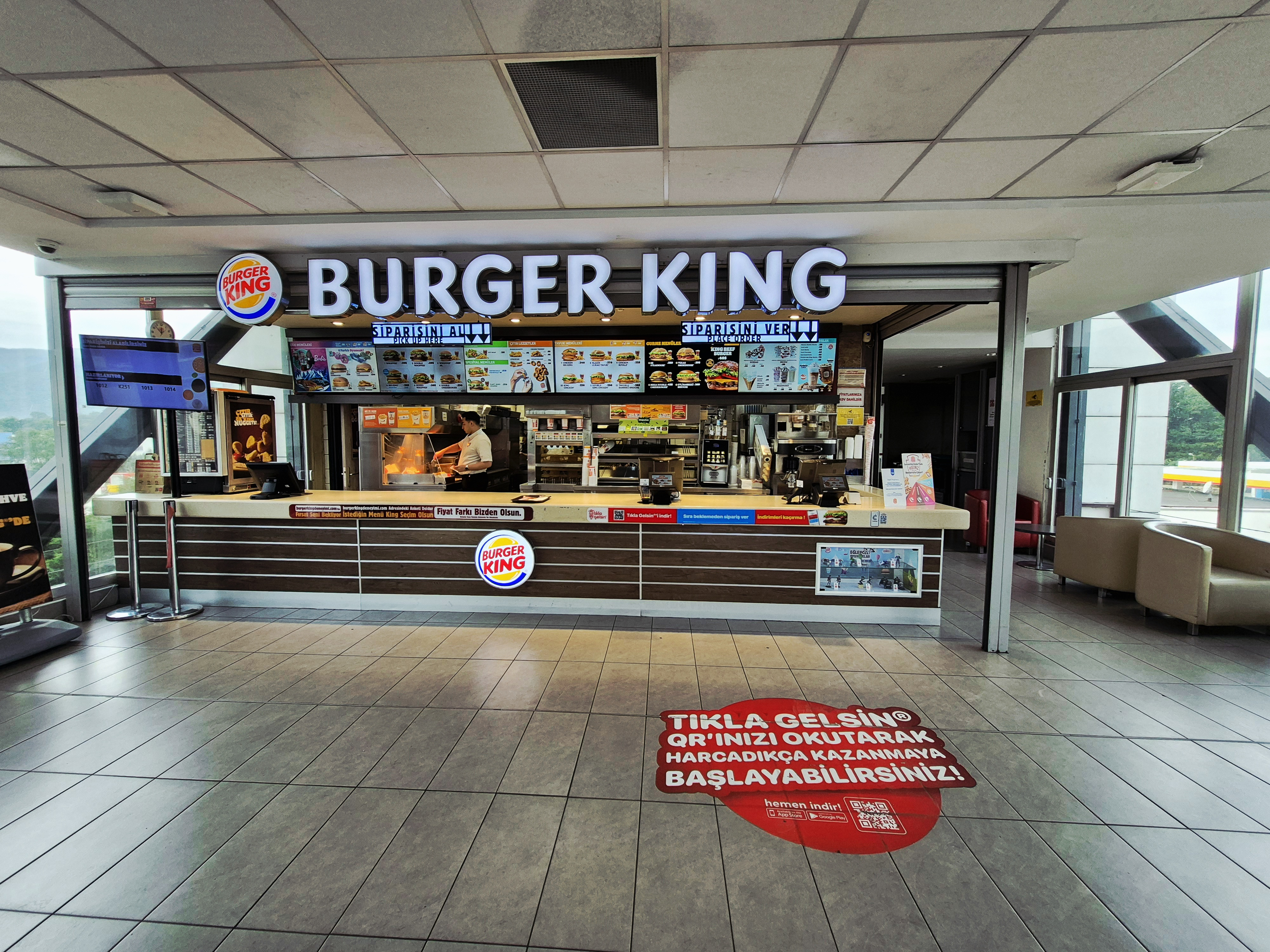
A Burger King restaurant in Kartepe, Turkey

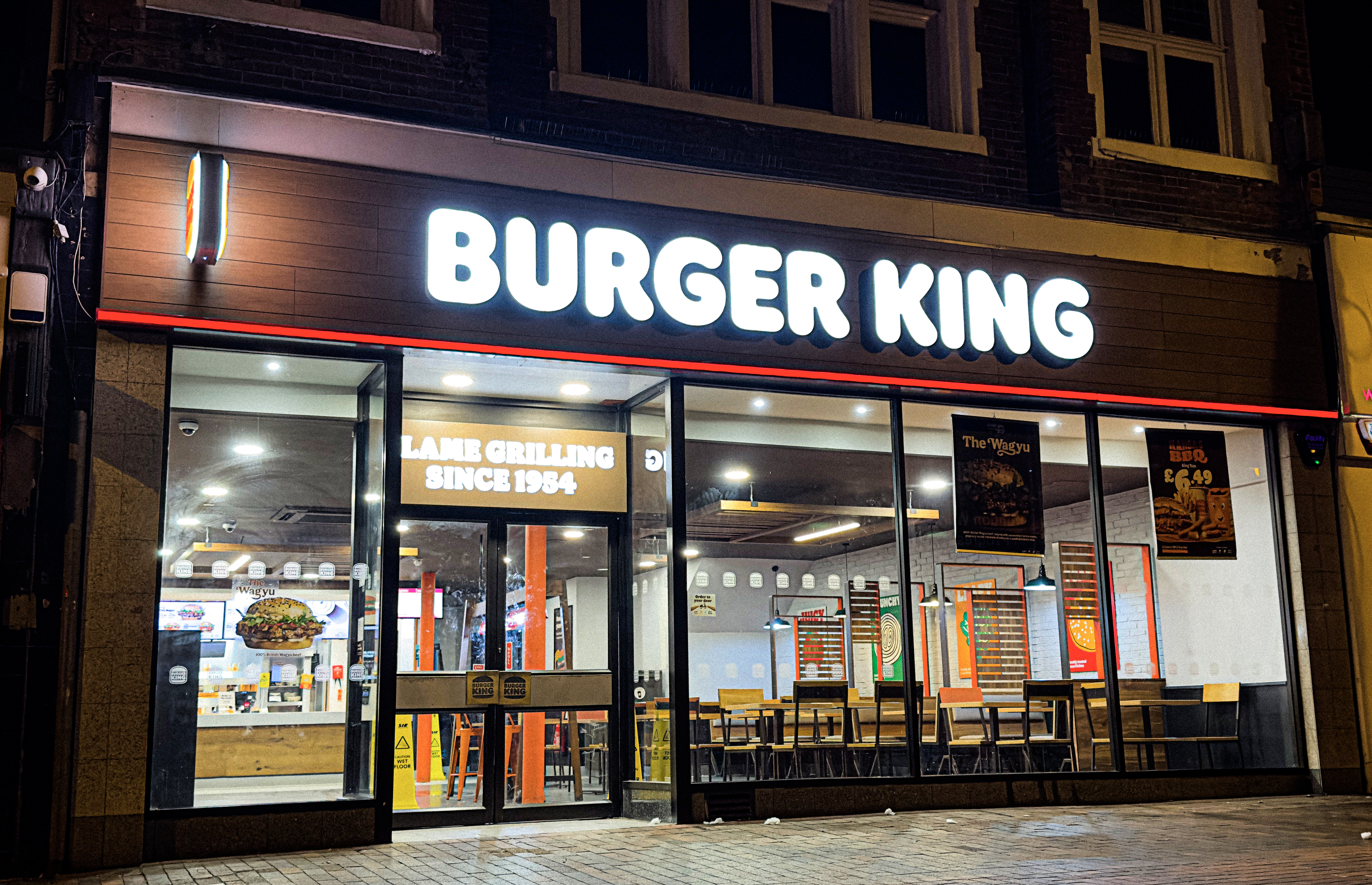
A Burger King restaurant in Chatham, England

== North America ==
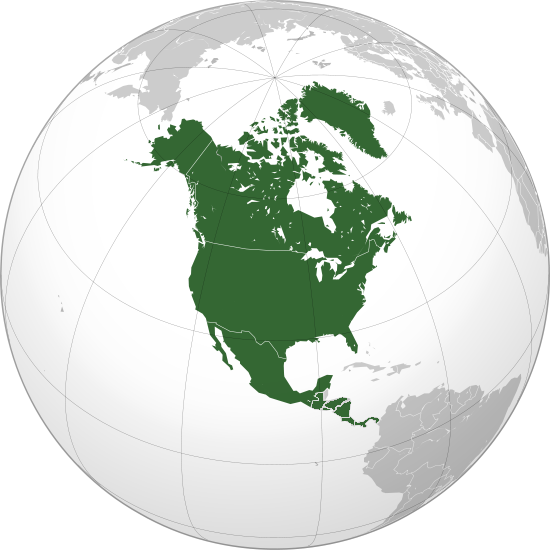
Map of countries in North America with Burger King locations (excluding Caribbean Islands)

North America is the company's home territory and home to its first non-American stores; it opened its first international restaurant in Windsor, Ontario, Canada in 1969.

Since its purchase in 2011, Burger King has seen a 14% sales increase in its Latin American and Caribbean operations. The continued expansion in these market could provide a significant portions of Burger King's growth during the decade of the 2010s. In the Mexican market, Burger King sold 97 corporate-owned locations to its largest franchisee in that country. The deal means multi-chain operator Alsea, S.A.B. de C.V will eventually operate approximately half of Mexico's 400+ Burger King locations while receiving exclusive expansion rights in Mexico for a twenty-year period.

Elsewhere in Central America, Burger King entered in a deal with another of its franchises, the Beboca Group of Panama, to create a new corporate entity to handle expansion and logistics in the LAC region, which until this time had no centralized operations group. The deal follows a unification of the company's web presence in Latin America and the Caribbean, as well as aligning all of its various web initiatives including mobile services, Facebook presence and guest relation tools. The Latin American moves are part of a corporate plan to take advantage of the growing middle class in these regions.

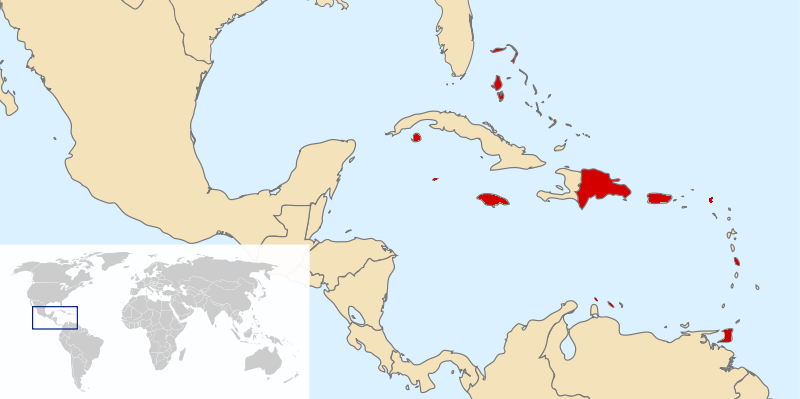
Map of countries in the Caribbean with Burger King locations

Burger King's growth into the Caribbean began in 1963 when the company opened its first location in Puerto Rico. These locations were the first restaurants the company opened outside the continental United States.

Country/territory	Year entered	No. of restaurants	Master franchisee	Notes
Antigua and Barbuda	2012	2	Island Burger Ltd.	Opened on March 27, 2012, second branch opened in 1st half of 2013.
Aruba	1981	4	All American Burgers Inc.	First hamburger QSR (quick service restaurant) to enter market.
(The Bahamas) Bahamas	1966	11	Edmiranda Restaurants Ltd.	
Barbados	2013	7	Restaurant Associates Limited	
Canada	1968	376	Redberry Investments Inc.	First international location.
Cayman Islands	1982	5	Burger Holdings Ltd.	
Costa Rica	1992	49	BK Centro America (BK and Beboca Ltd.)	Closed in October 2015 because of numerous issues with local franchiser and license usage; returned in June 2016 with a new restaurant opened in San José.
Curaçao	2008	3	JDA Foods B.V.	
Dominican Republic	1994	35	Concesiones y Servicios, S.A.S.	
El Salvador	1994	49	BK Centro America (BK and Beboca Ltd.)	It originally started in 1993 as a food truck.
Guatemala	1989	60	BK Centro America (BK and Beboca Ltd.)	First location in La zona nueve.
Greenland	2025	2	Pisiffik A/S	Currently, Burger King is the first and only US international fast food chain to enter in the island. First location opened in Sisimiut on October 30, 2025.
Honduras	1990	45	BK Centro America (BK and Beboca Ltd.)	
Jamaica	1985	32	Restaurant Associates Limited	First location in Ocho Rios.
Martinique	2014	3	Monplaisir Group	
Mexico	1991	467	Burger King Mexicana, S.A. de C.V.	First outlet in Yucatán.
Nicaragua	2008	4	BK Centro America (BK and Beboca Ltd.)	Reentered in 2020 after closing in 2018.
Panama	1981	31	Adiser (Grupo Vierci)	
Puerto Rico	1963	160	Caribbean Restaurants, LLC	First Burger King Location outside the continental United States.
Saint Kitts and Nevis	2017	1	DJ Food and Beverages	
Sint Maarten	?	3	JDA Foods	
Trinidad and Tobago	2008	14	Restaurant Holdings Limited	
United States	1953	6,649	Burger King Corporation	Founded as Insta-Burger King in 1953; purchased in 1959 by current company.

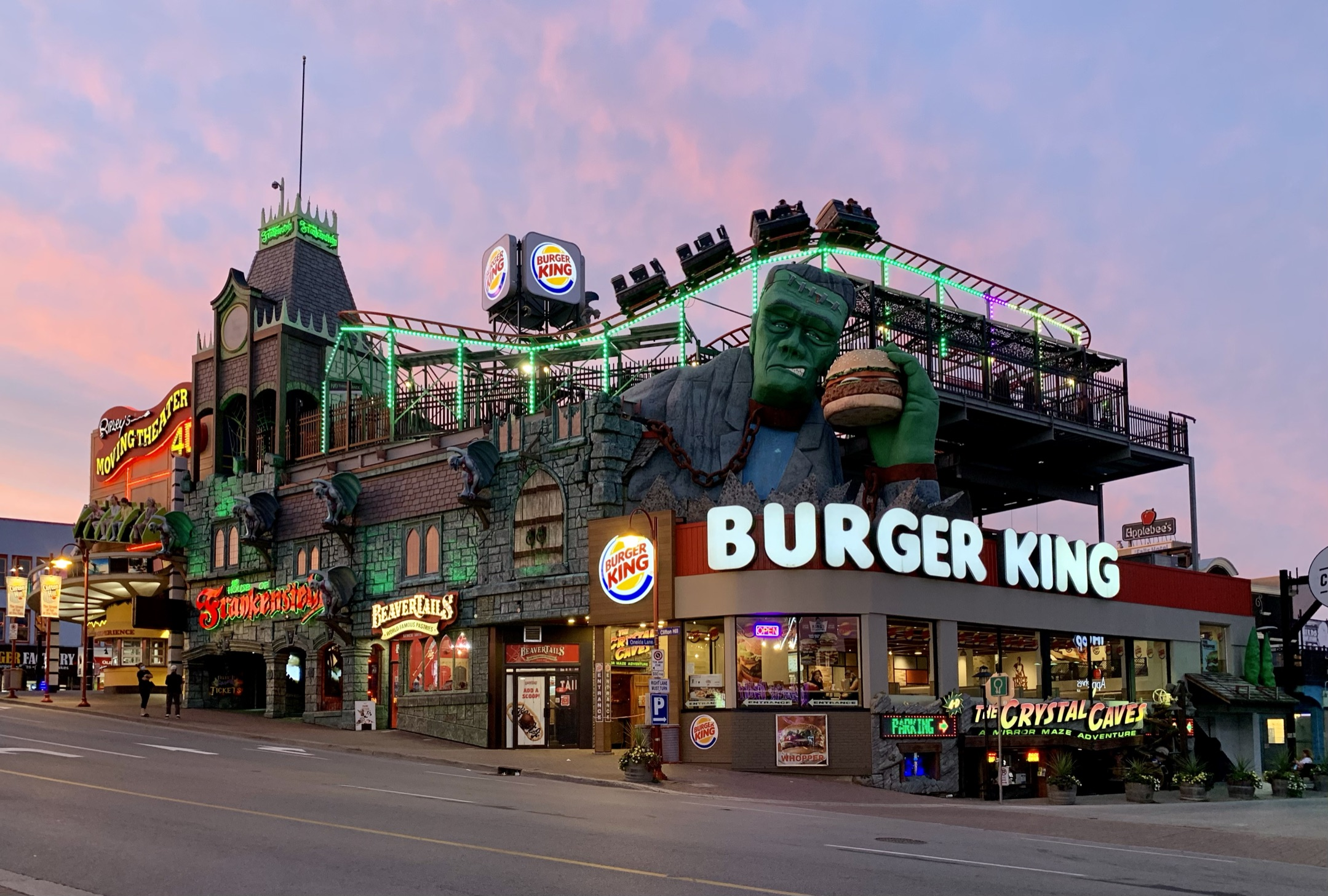
A Burger King restaurant at Clifton Hills, Niagara Falls, Ontario, Canada

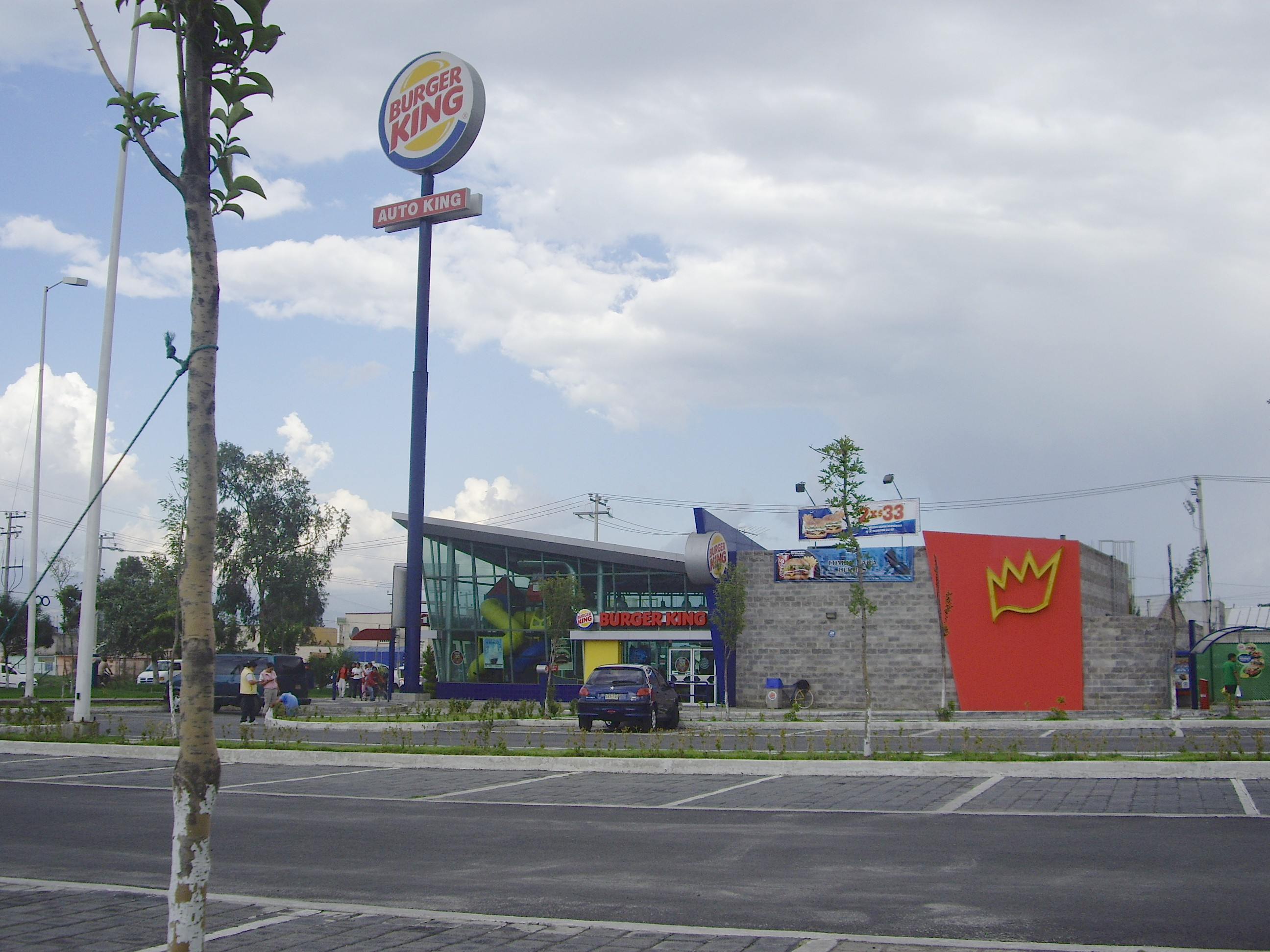
A Burger King restaurant in Chalco, Mexico City, Mexico

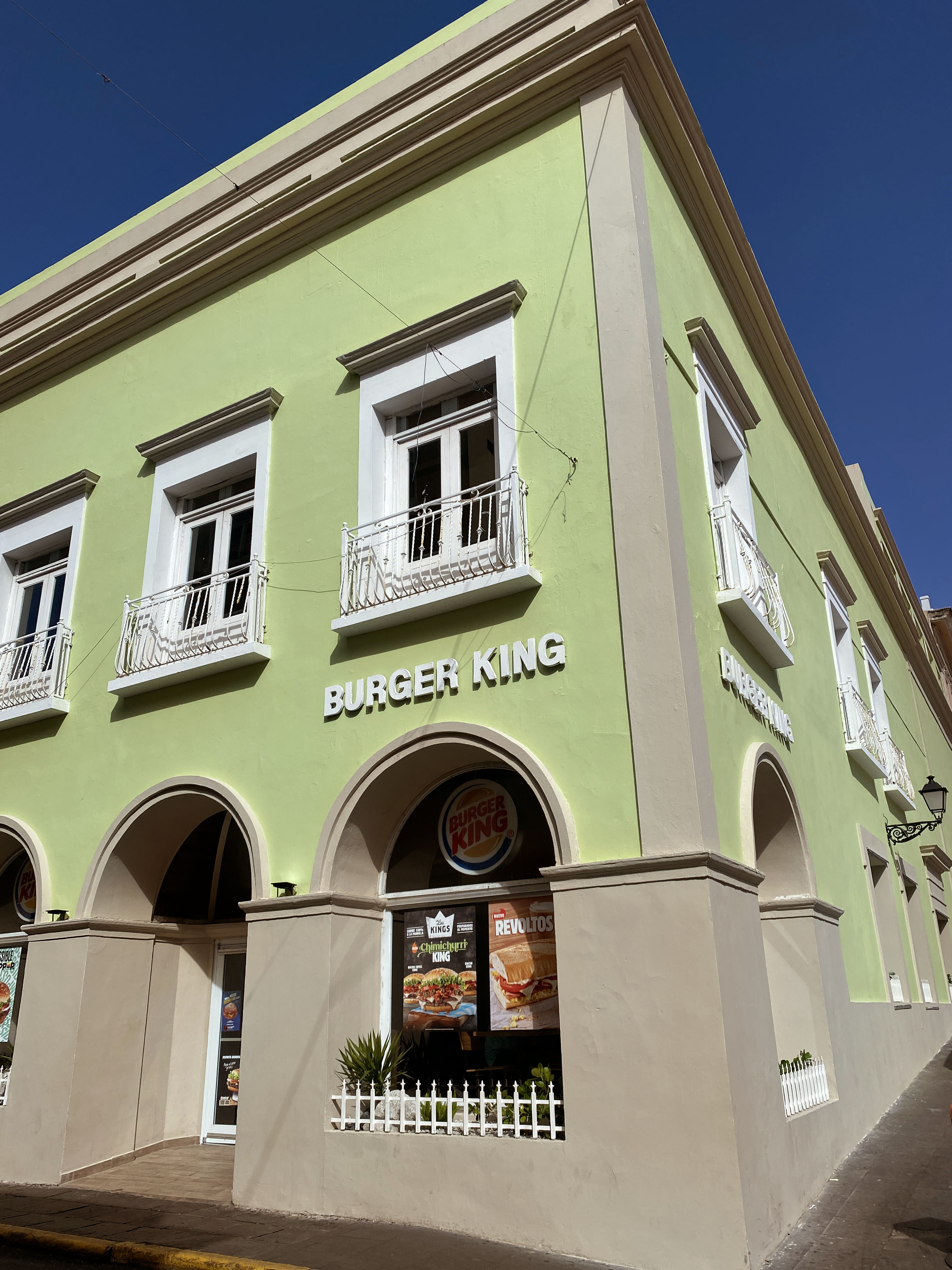
A Burger King restaurant in Old San Juan, Puerto Rico, United States

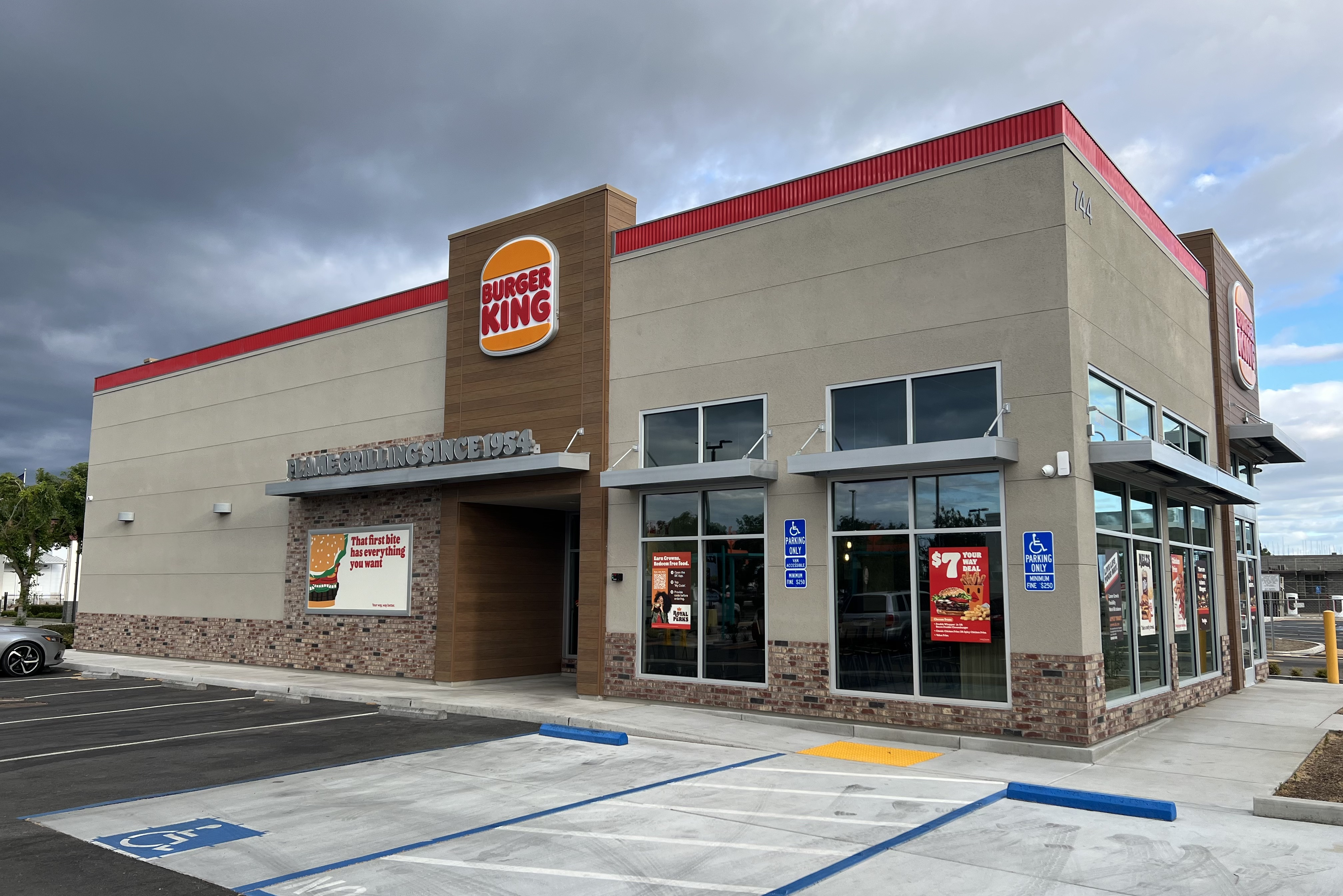
A Burger King restaurant in Ripon, California, United States

== Oceania ==
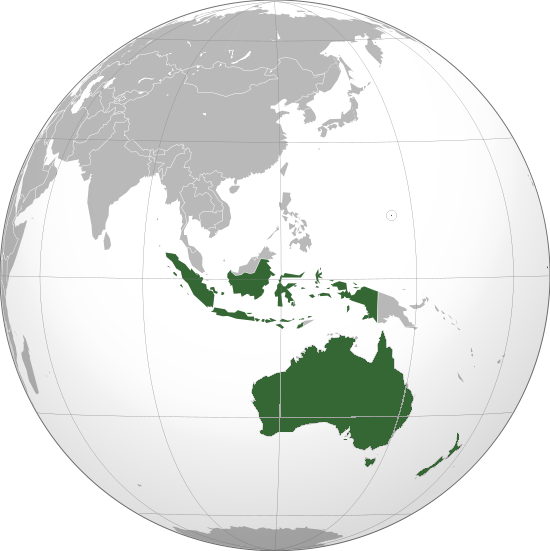
Map of countries in Oceania with Burger King locations

When Burger King moved to expand its operations into Australia, it found that its business name was already trademarked by a takeaway food shop in Adelaide. The Canadian-Australian franchisee, Jack Cowin, selected the "Hungry Jack" brand name, one of then Burger King's owner Pillsbury's U.S. pancake mixture products, and slightly changed the name to a possessive form by adding an apostrophe and "s" to form the new name "Hungry Jack's". In 1996, shortly after the Australian trademark on the Burger King name lapsed, Burger King began to open its own Australian stores in 1997. As a result of Burger King's actions, Hungry Jack's owner Jack Cowin and his company Competitive Foods Australia, began legal proceedings in 2001 against the Burger King Corporation. Hungry Jack's won the case, and Burger King eventually left the country. Hungry Jack's took ownership of the former Burger King locations and subsequently renamed the remaining Burger King locations as Hungry Jack's. As of June 2019, Burger King had 83 stores operating in New Zealand. Due to the COVID-19 pandemic, Burger King went into receivership in April 2020.

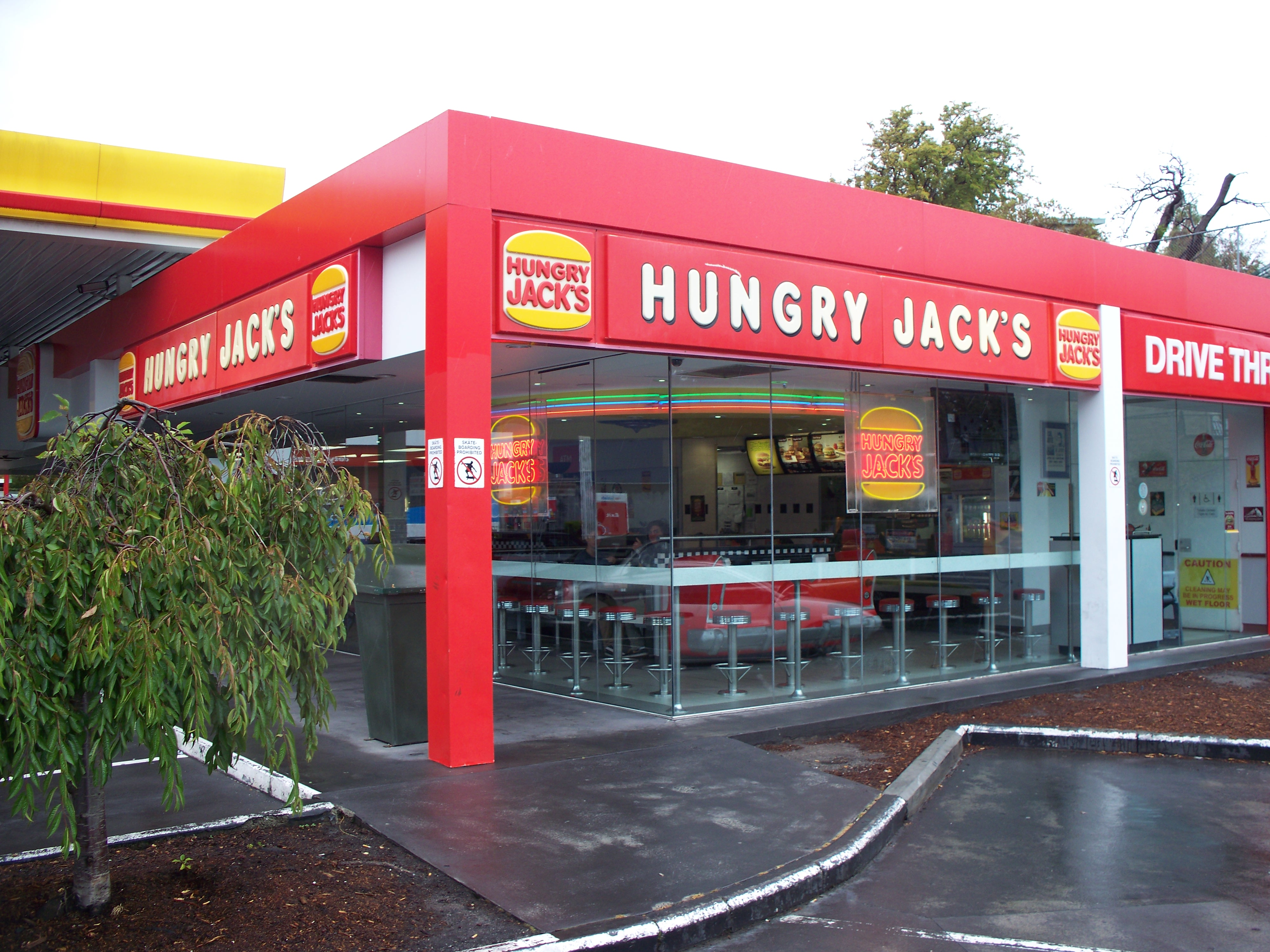
A Hungry Jack's/Coles Express/Shell outlet in Elizabeth Street, Hobart. From 1997 until it was rebranded in 2003 this was Hobart's first and only Burger King-branded outlet, and was the first Burger King in Australia to be located outside an airport.

Country/territory	Year entered	No. of restaurants	Master franchisee	Notes
Australia	1971	480	Hungry Jack's Pty Ltd (Competitive Foods Australia)	Operated under Hungry Jack's brand.
Guam	?	4	Baba Corp	
Fiji	2015	7	Motibhai Group	
French Polynesia	2023	1	Groupe Malmezac JV	
New Caledonia	2017	3	SODEC	The first store opened in Nouméa in 2017.
New Zealand	1993	79	Antares Restaurant Group (Tahua Partners)	Original owners, TPF Group, sold the company in 2009. Went into receivership under Blackstone Group, sold to Tahua Partners in 2021.

== South America ==
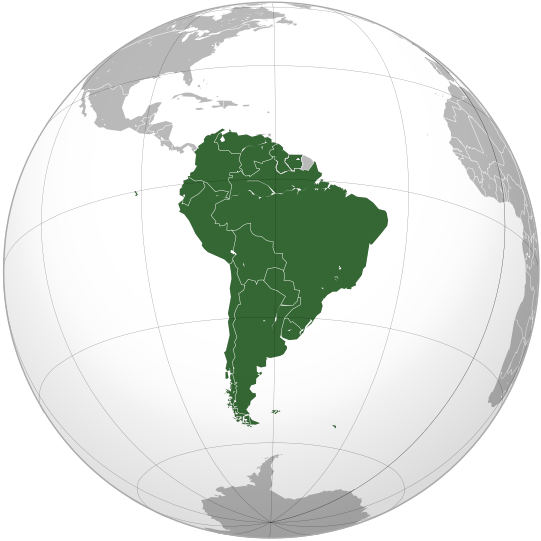
Map of countries in South America with Burger King locations

Country/territory	Year entered	No. of restaurants	Master franchisee	Notes
Argentina	1989	112	Alsea	
Bolivia	1999	19	Samuel Doria Medina	
Brazil	2004	985	ZAMP S.A.	Operates with a territorial franchises system.
Chile	1994	91	Alsea	
Colombia	2008	43	Kinco S.A.	Originally operated during 1980s.
Ecuador	1982	29	Resrap/Alicosta Bk Holding	
French Guiana	2025	1	Rudisa International N.V.	First restaurant announced for Saint-Laurent-du-Maroni (Hyper U); recruitment underway. Not listed by RBI as of 31 Dec 2024.
Guyana	2017	6	Corum Group	
Paraguay	1995	43	Fast Food Sudamericana (Grupo Vierci)	
Peru	1993	37	Franquicias Alimentarias (Delosi)	
Suriname	2008	2	Burger King Suriname	The first outlet is located in the capital city of Paramaribo.
Uruguay	December 2015	28	Adiser S.A. (Grup Vierci)	
Venezuela	1980	15	Grupo Rica Internacional	

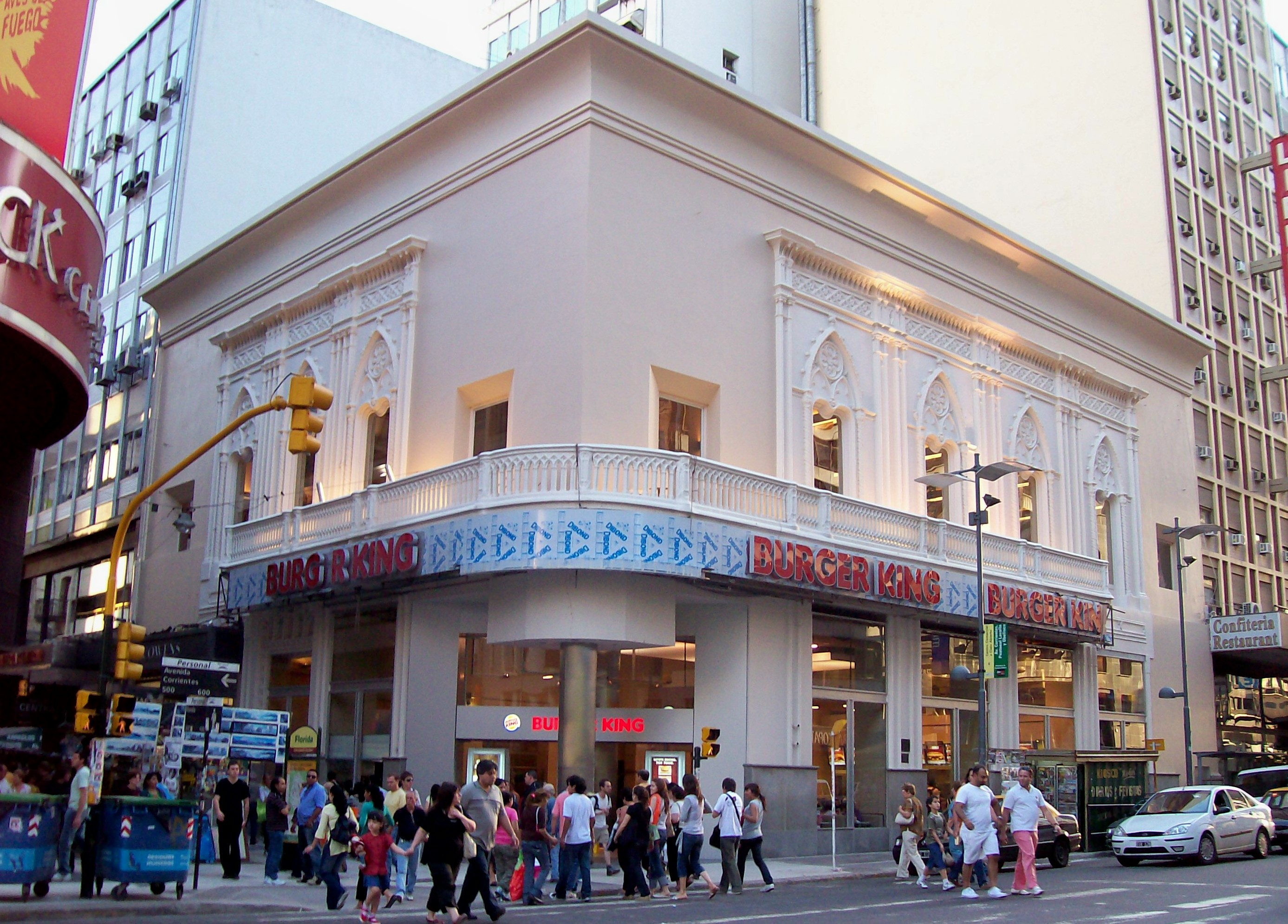
A Burger King restaurant in Buenos Aires, Argentina

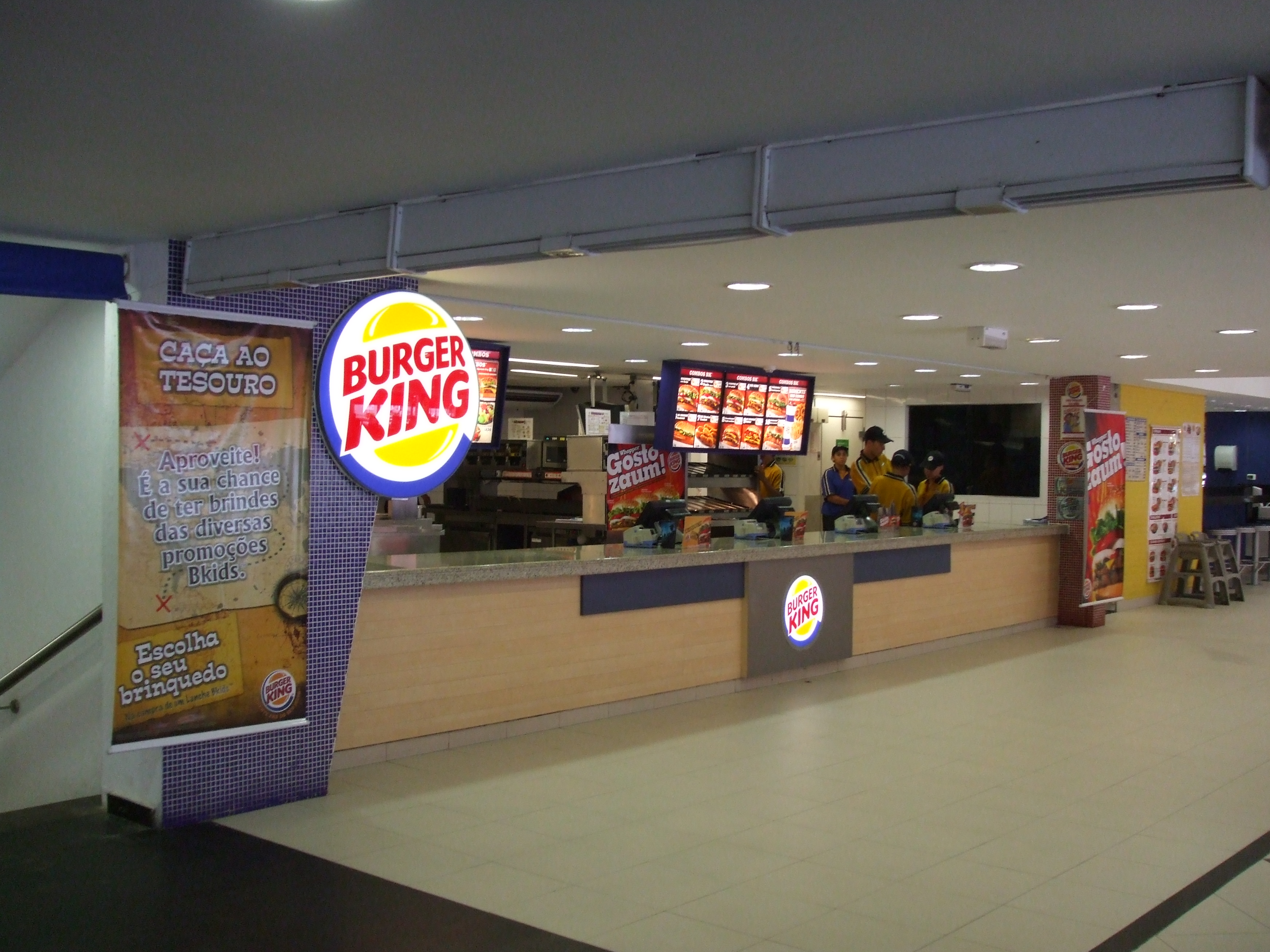
A Burger King restaurant in Guarujá, Brazil

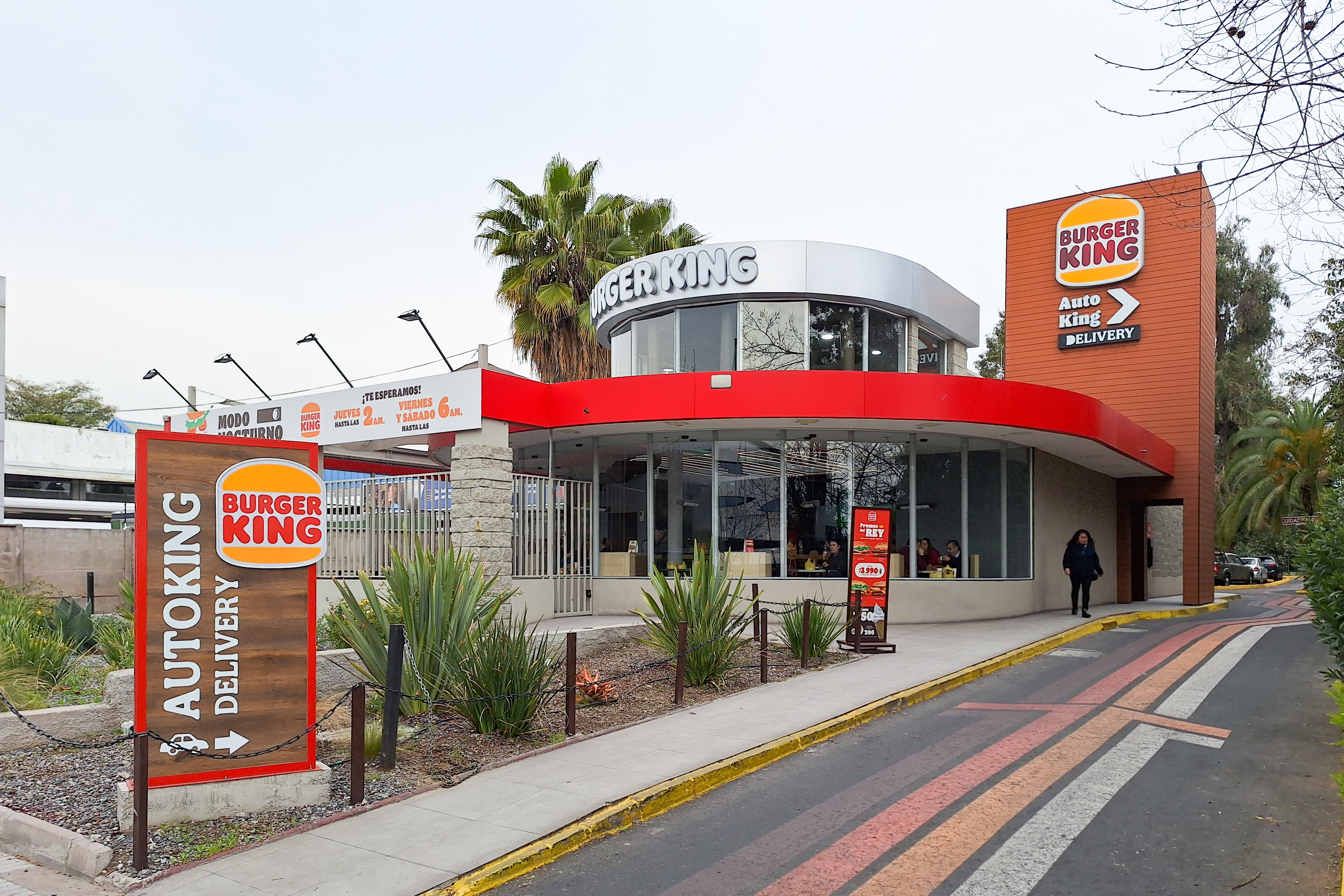
A Burger King restaurant in Santiago, Chile

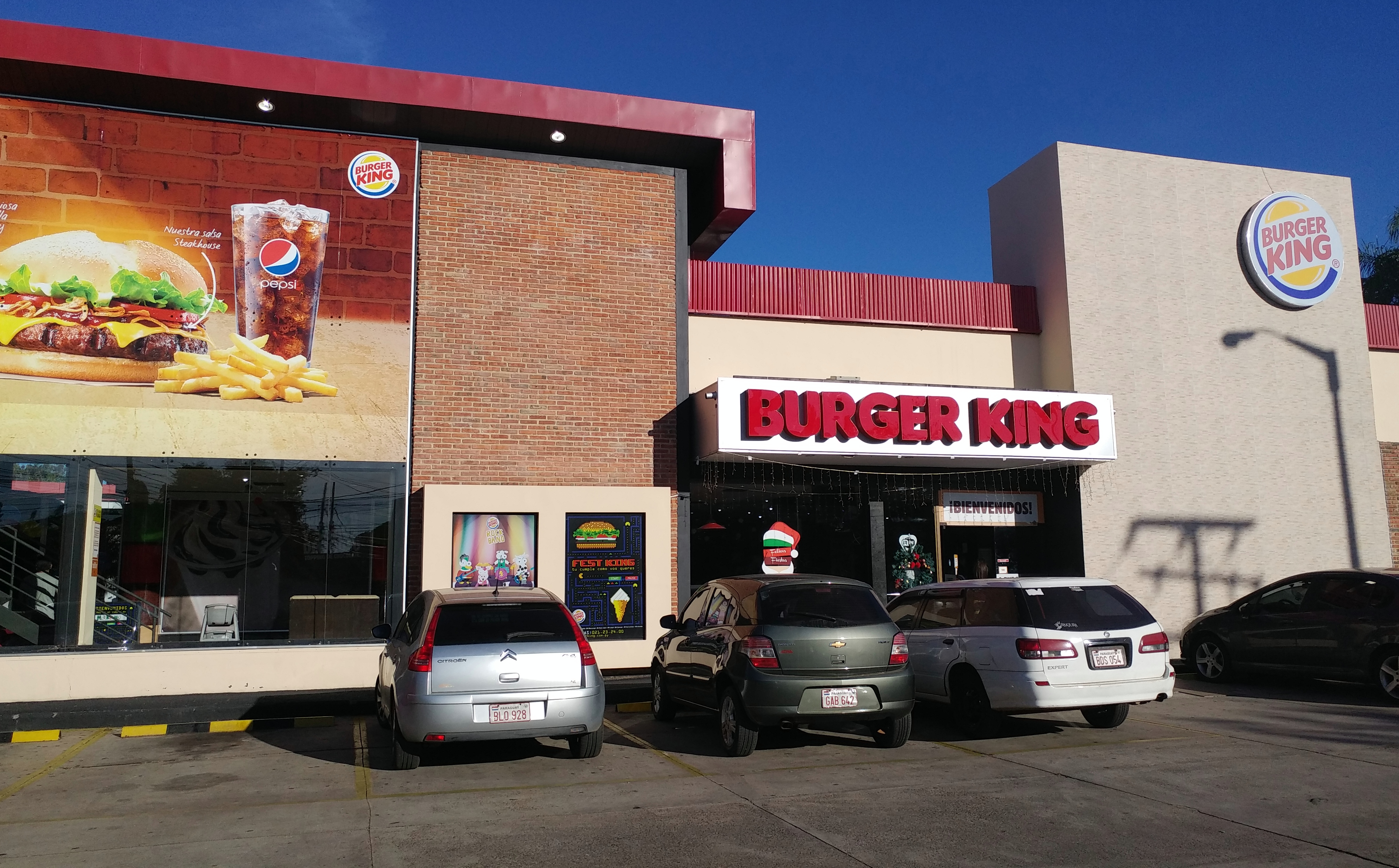
A Burger King restaurant in Asunción, Paraguay

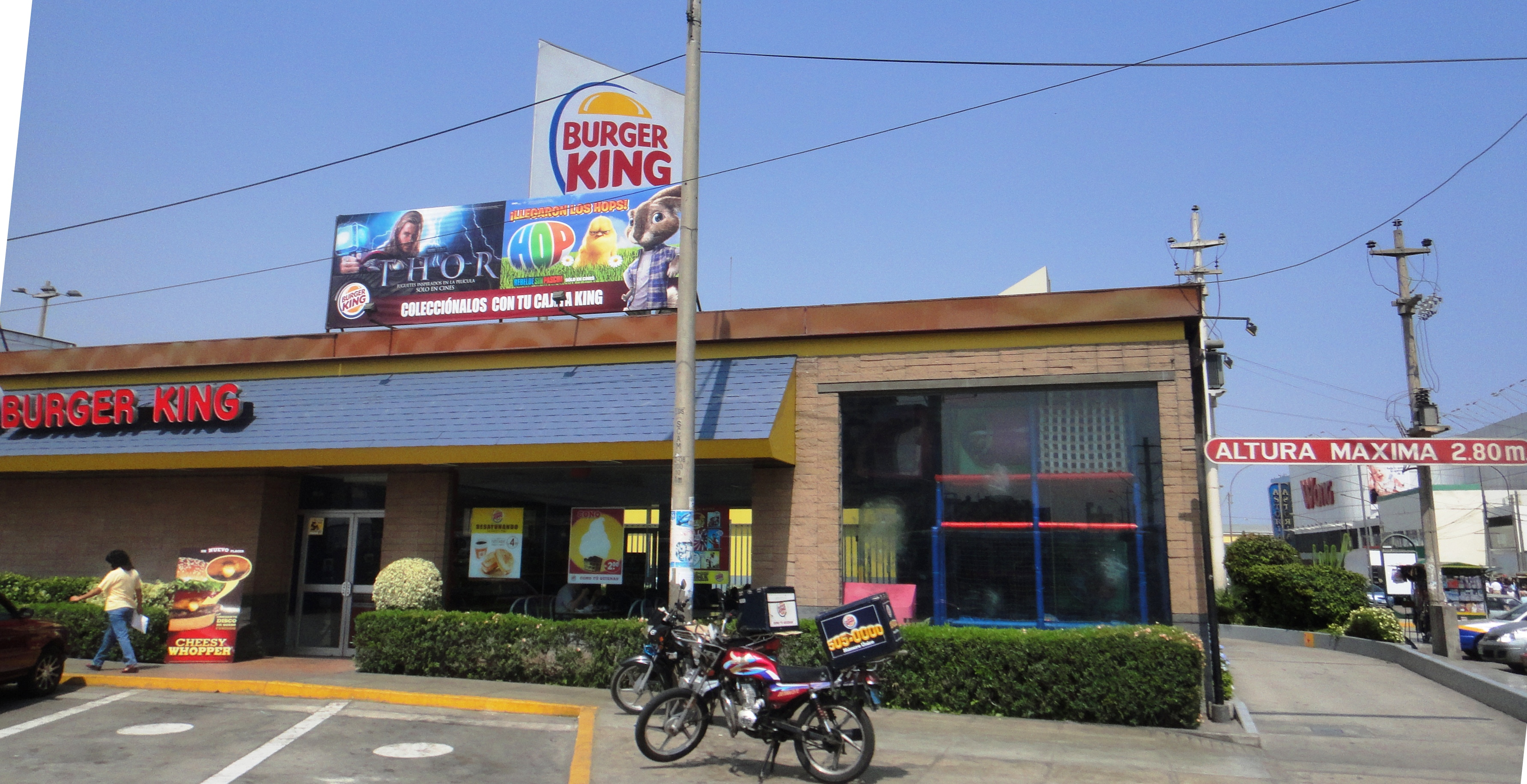
A Burger King restaurant in Lima, Peru.

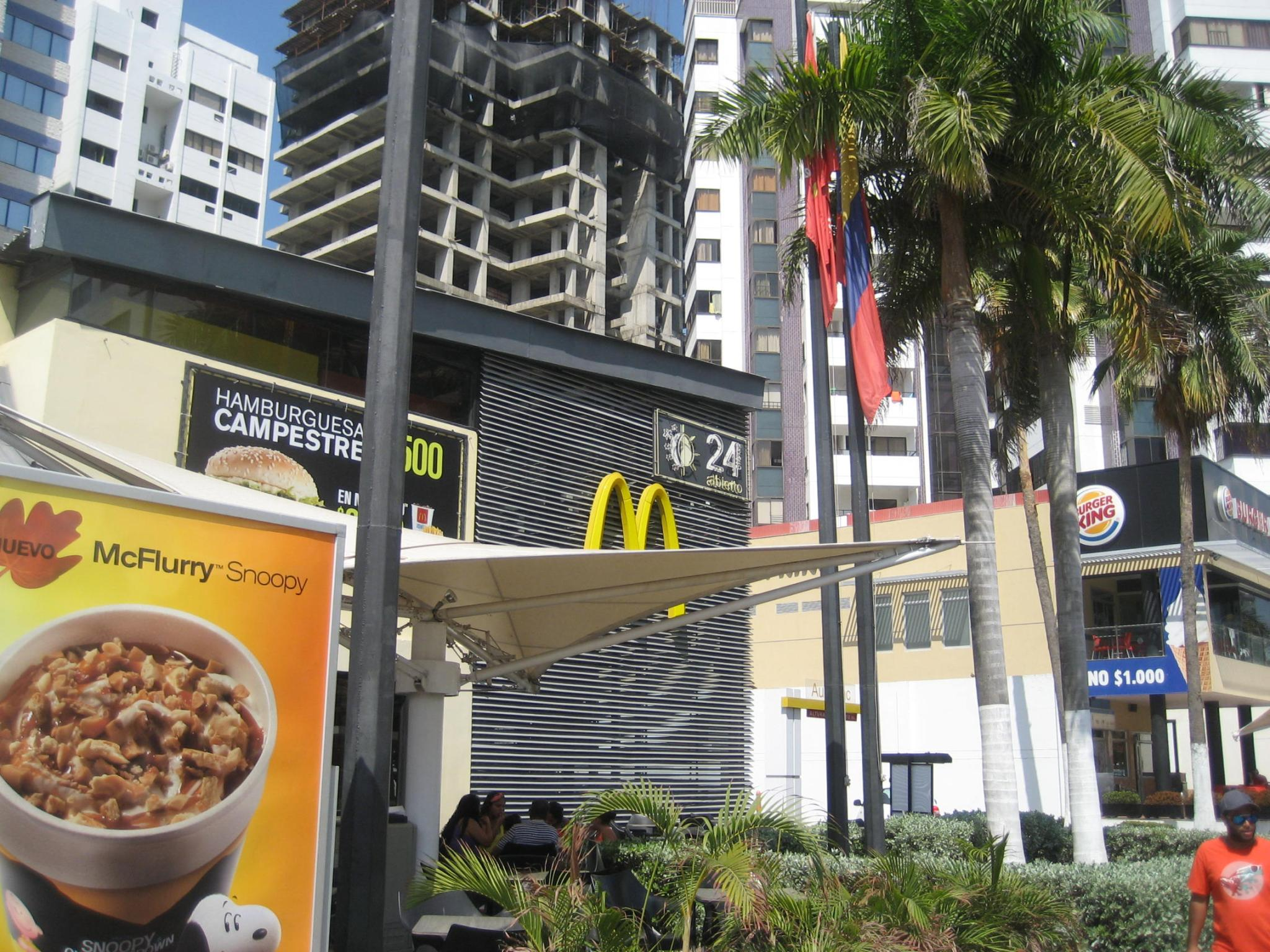
A Burger King restaurant in Cartagena, Colombia.

== Former markets ==
Country/territory	Year entered	Year closed	Master franchisee	Notes
Iceland	2004	2008	Tankur.ehf	Left on December 31, 2008.
Jersey	2016	2025	Sandpiper CI	Formerly three BK outlets in Jersey, later only one. Closed in 2025.
Pakistan	2013	2022	MCR Group	Opened in Karachi on October 5, 2013; operations suspended and all outlets closed in 2022; nine outlets at time of sale; planned relaunch under Maaks International.
Saint Lucia	2010	2024	–	Former presence in Rodney Bay; not listed by RBI as of December 31, 2024.
Ukraine	2006	2016	Ysa Group	Operated in Kyiv and Odesa in 2006, closed in 2016.
(United States Virgin Islands) U.S. Virgin Islands	1983	1997	?	Left both St. Croix and St. Thomas in 1997.

== International subsidiaries ==
Burger King has approximately 20 foreign subsidiaries to oversee operations in the markets it does business in.

Subsidiary	Country/territory
Administracion de Comidas Rapidas, S.A. de C.V.	Mexico
BK Argentina Servicios, S.A.	Argentina
BK Asiapac (Japan) Y.K.	Japan (Note: Oversees franchise operations in Japan)
BK Asiapac, Pte. Ltd.	Singapore (Note: Oversees franchise operations in east Asia, the Pacific rim and Oceania except Australia)
BK Grundstücksverwaltungs Beteiligungs GmbH & Co. KG	Germany
BK Venezuela Servicios, C.A.	Venezuela
BK (Hong Kong) Development Co. Limited	Hong Kong
Burger King (Gibraltar) Ltd.	Gibraltar
Burger King (Luxembourg) S.a.r.l.	Luxembourg
Burger King (Shanghai) Restaurant Company Ltd.	China
Burger King (United Kingdom) Ltd.	United Kingdom
Burger King SEE S.A.	Belgium (Note: Subsidiary of Burger King Luxembourg; master franchisee for the Burger King Brand in Italy, Poland, Greece and Romania)
Burger King A.B	Sweden
Burger King B.V.	Netherlands
Burger King Restaurant Operations of Canada, Inc.	Canada
Burger King de Puerto Rico, Inc.	Puerto Rico
Burger King do Brasil Assessoria a Restaurantes Ltda.	Brazil
Burger King España S.L.U.	Spain
Burger King Europe GmbH	Switzerland (Note: Oversees franchise operations in Europe, Africa and west Asia)
Burger King Gıda Sanayi ve Ticaret Limited Şirketi	Turkey
Burger King Interamerica, LLC	Florida
Burger King Israel Ltd.	Israel
Burger King Italia, S.r.L	Italy
Burger King Korea Ltd.	South Korea
Burger King (RUS) LLC	Russia
Burger King Sweden, Inc.	Sweden
