= List of restaurants in Israel =

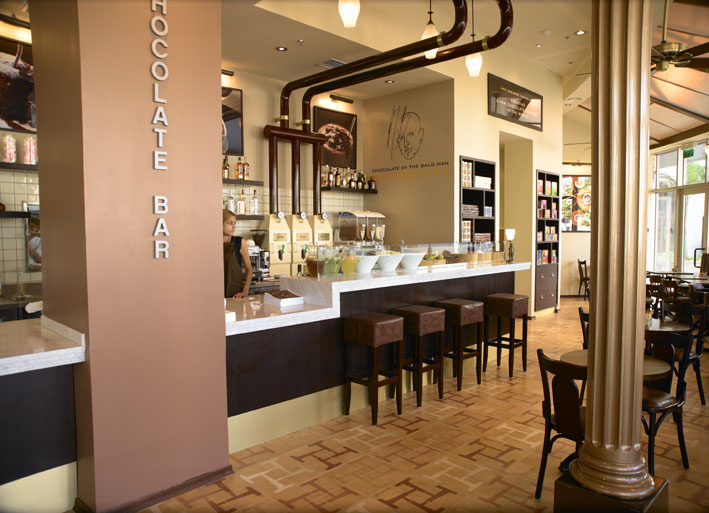
Max Brenner chocolate bar in Herzliya

This list of restaurants in Israel contains a selection of restaurant chains and individual chains that operate and operated in Israel. In 2007 there were about 4,400 food and beverage vendors in Israel. By 2012 about 8000 such business were reported. With the highest percentage of vegan population by some estimates, Israel is home to many vegan restaurants.

== Restaurant chains ==
=== International chains operating in Israel ===
==== Israeli international chains ====
- Aroma Espresso Bar – espresso and coffee chain with (in 2026) 188 branches in Israel and 23 in Canada. It exited Kazakhstan, Romania, Ukraine, and the United States.
- B-Fresh – Israeli international smoothie chain with (in 2026) 93 outlets in Israel and 7 in the United States, exactly 100 combined.
- Cofix – Israeli coffee house chain selling affordable items with locations in Asian and European countries
- Cafe Landwer – restaurant chain with (in 2026) 47 locations in Israel, 7 in the United States, and 1 in Canada.
- Machneyuda Group – International restaurant group centered in Jerusalem, includes the Machneyuda restaurant.
- Max Brenner – Israeli chocolate shop and restaurant with (in 2026) 2 restaurants in Israel, 2 in the US, and 15 separate branches in Australia. It also operates 4 stores in Israel.
- Miznon – Israeli chain with (in 2026) 20 restaurants around Asia, Europe, North America, and Oceania.
- Pizza Shemesh – chain of (in 2026) 101 pizzerias in Israel and 1 in Phuket, Thailand. Owned by the Hassid Yeshurun Group in Rishon Lezion.
- HaSalon – International chain of restaurants based in Tel Aviv

==== American international chains ====
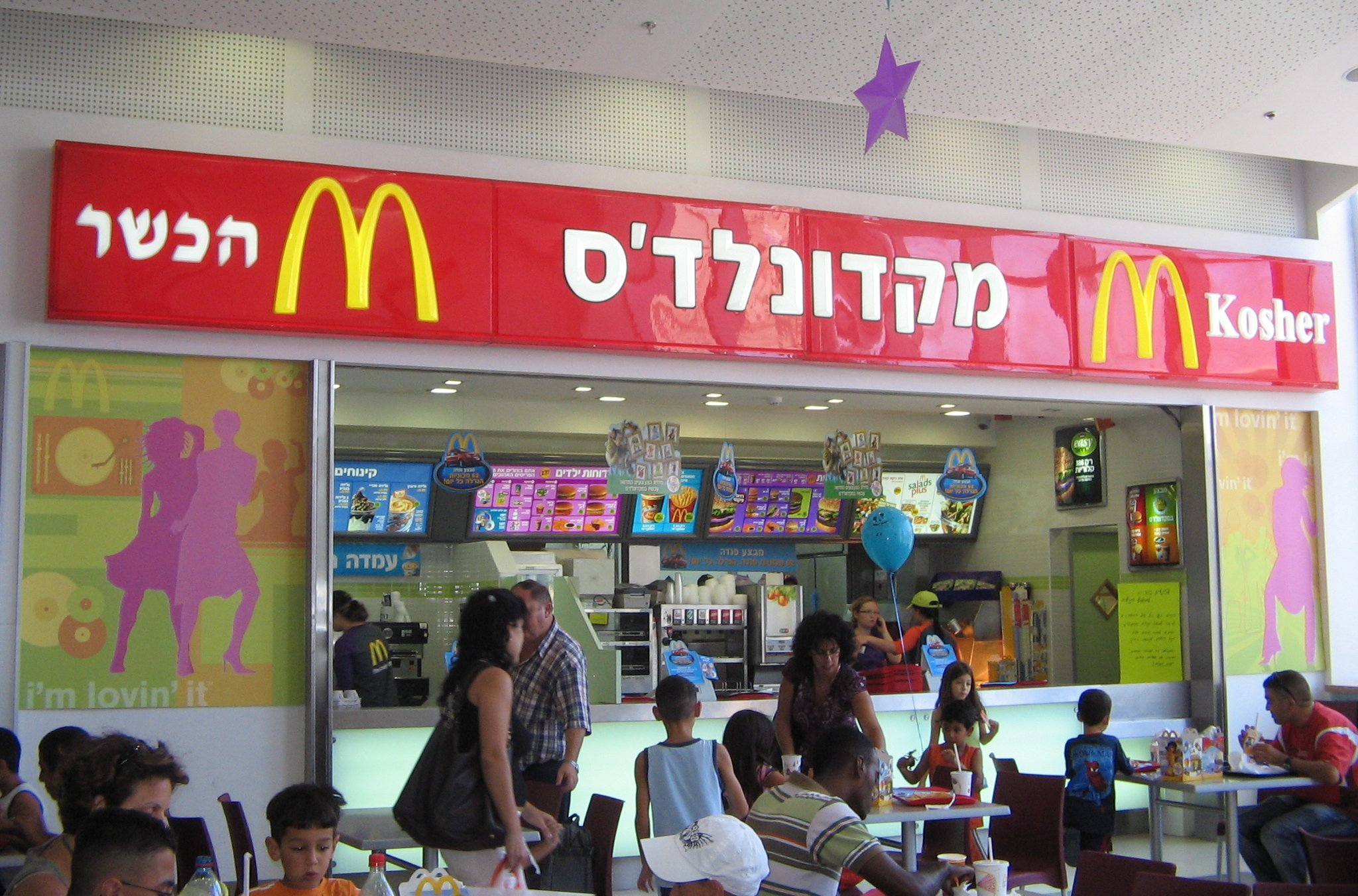
Former Kosher McDonald's in Ashkelon

- Burger King – operating (in 2026) 19 locations, out of (in 2023) 19,000 worldwide.
- Domino's Pizza – operating (in 2026) 131 locations around Israel out of (in 2024) 21,000 worldwide.
- KFC – Operating (in 2026) 12 branches in Israel out of (in 2025) 32,000 worldwide.
- McDonald's – 225 locations out of 40,000 locations worldwide
- Papa John's Pizza – operates 25 locations around Israel, out of 5,000 locations worldwide
- Pizza Hut – operating 43 locations around Israel out of 19,000 locations worldwide.

=== Israeli chains operating only in Israel ===
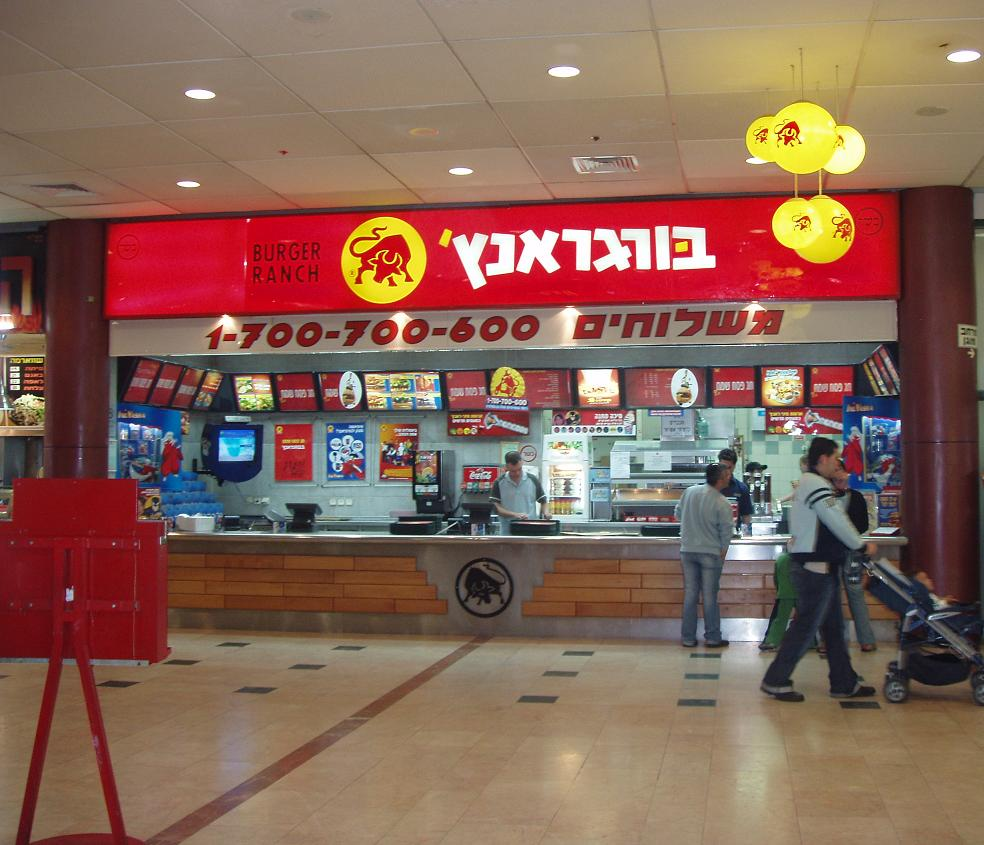
Burgeranch in Ashdod

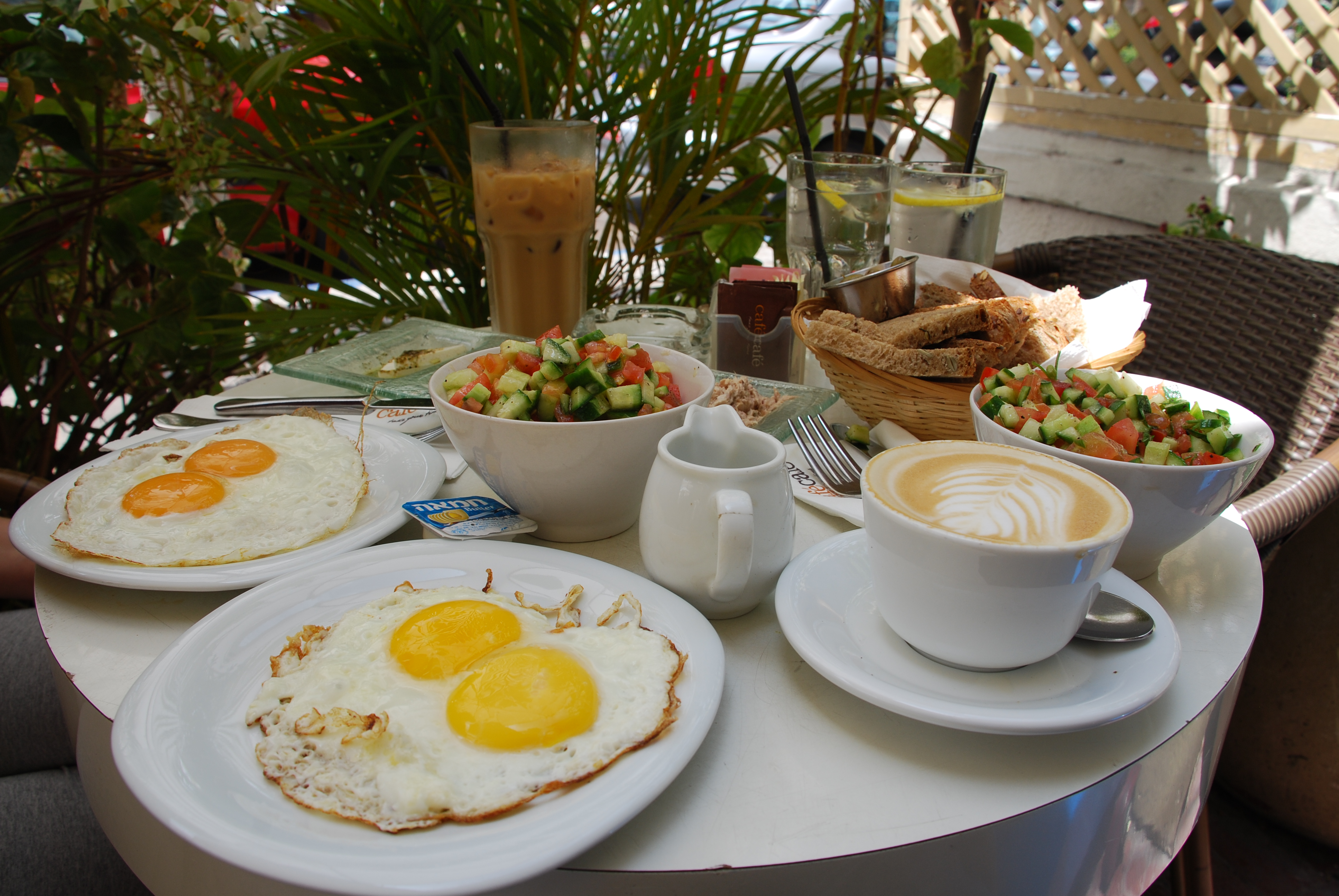
Israeli breakfast served at Café Café

==== Large: 80 branches and more ====
- Burgers Bar – sit-down, American-style bar restaurant with (in 2026) 90 locations across Israel
- Café Café – Israeli coffee chain with about (in 2026) 81 locations. Went international for a while, before fully concentrating on the Israeli market. The Café Café Group includes additional Israeli chains.
- Golda - chain of (in 2026) 114 ice cream parlors
- Greg Cafe – Israeli café-restaurant chain with in (in 2026) 82 locations.
- Hummus Eliyahu – chain of (in 2026) 85 hummus restaurants, founded in 2008 by Eliyahu Shmueli.
- Ilan's – Café chain with (in 2025) about 80 locations in Israel, including in railway stations and at Ben Gurion Airport. Founded by Ilan Shenhav in 1994.
- Rebar chain of (in 2026) 117 smoothie and food outlets
- Roladin – largest bakery chain in Israel, with (in 2026) 95 locations around Israel

==== Midsize: 15–79 branches ====
- Arcaffe – chain of cafes in Israel with (in 2026) 51 outlets across the country
- Burgeranch – fast-food chain with (in 2026) 56 restaurants
- Dr. Lek – Icecream parlor chain with (in 2026) 18 outlets. Started in Yafo.
- Falafel Baribua – Restaurant chain with (in 2026) 24 branches. Owned by Y Food Brands Group.
- Janpanika – Sushi chain with (in 2026) 46 locations around Israel

==== Small: 5–14 branches ====
- Beit Haful – chain of (in 2026) 10 Mediterranean restaurants in Southern Israel
- Big Apple Pizza – New York City–style pizza chain with (in 2026) 11 locations around Israel
- Biscotti – Cafe-restaurant-bakery-catering chain with (in 2026) 9 suburban branches, founded in 2003. Centered in Bnei Brak.
- Black Bar 'n' Burger – burger chain with (in 2026) 7 locations across Israel
- Cafeneto – Café-restaurant chain founded 1994 with (in 2026) 6 locations: three in Tel Aviv, two in Ra'anana in one in Jerusalem.
- Café Joe – Café chain with (in 2026) 13 locations. Along with Burger King Israel, owned by Delek.
- Holy Bagel – bagel store chain with (in 2026) 8 locations around Israel
- HaShamen – Shawarma chain with (in 2026) 10 locations
- Si Café – café-restaurants with (in 2026) 11 locations, serving Segafredo Zanetti coffee. Owned by and operated at Dor Alon gas stations.

==== Tiny: 2–4 branches ====
- Abu Hassan – hummus restaurant with (in 2026) 3 locations in Jaffa
- Abulafia – bakery with three branches in Tel Aviv-Yafo
- Mercaz HaHummus HaAsli – a tiny chain of Mediterranean restaurants in Tel Aviv-Yafo
- Mike's Place – American-style bar with (in 2026) 3 locations around Israel: Tel Aviv, Jerusalem and Eilat.
- Papagaio – churrascaria-style restaurant with (in 2026) 1 location in Herzliya and 1 Jerusalem
- Café Rimon – chain of (in 2026) 3 locations: two in Jerusalem and one in Beit Shemesh
- Shfaram Ice Cream – Ice cream, pastries and cafe since 1939. Has (in 2026) three branches.
- Villa Mare – tiny bistro chain with (in 2026) 2 seaside locations, one in Tel Aviv and one in Bat Yam.

=== International chains that failed in Israel ===
- The Cheesecake Factory – operated 8 locations around Israel until 2020. The Rishon restaurant continued for a while as The Factory.
- Dunkin' Donuts – At one time operated 9 branches in Israel, then folded.
- Sbarro – entered Israel in 1995. Had 25 branches at the height of its success, then folded.
- Starbucks – had 20 locations in the greater Tel Aviv region. Pulled out for lack of profitability.
- Subway – had 23 locations around Israel. Closed in 2004.
- Wendy's – operated a few years from 1987, had just a few branches.
- Wimpy – An Israeli branch started in the 1960s. It expanded to Sinai, Greece, Turkey, Cyprus, and Iran before folding in the 1980s.

== Restaurants ==
=== North ===
- Abu Christo – Waterfront Mediterranean seafood restaurant in Acre, founded 1948 by Anastas Triantafyll.
- Beit Lishansky – Israeli cuisine restaurant in Metula, founded 1936 by Mela Lishansky.
- El Janina – Arab restaurant in Nazareth, founded between 1943 and 1947 by Abu Maher Aonalla.
- Uri Buri – Waterfront Mediterranean seafood restaurant in Acre, founded 1989 in Nahariya by Uri Jeremias.

=== Haifa ===
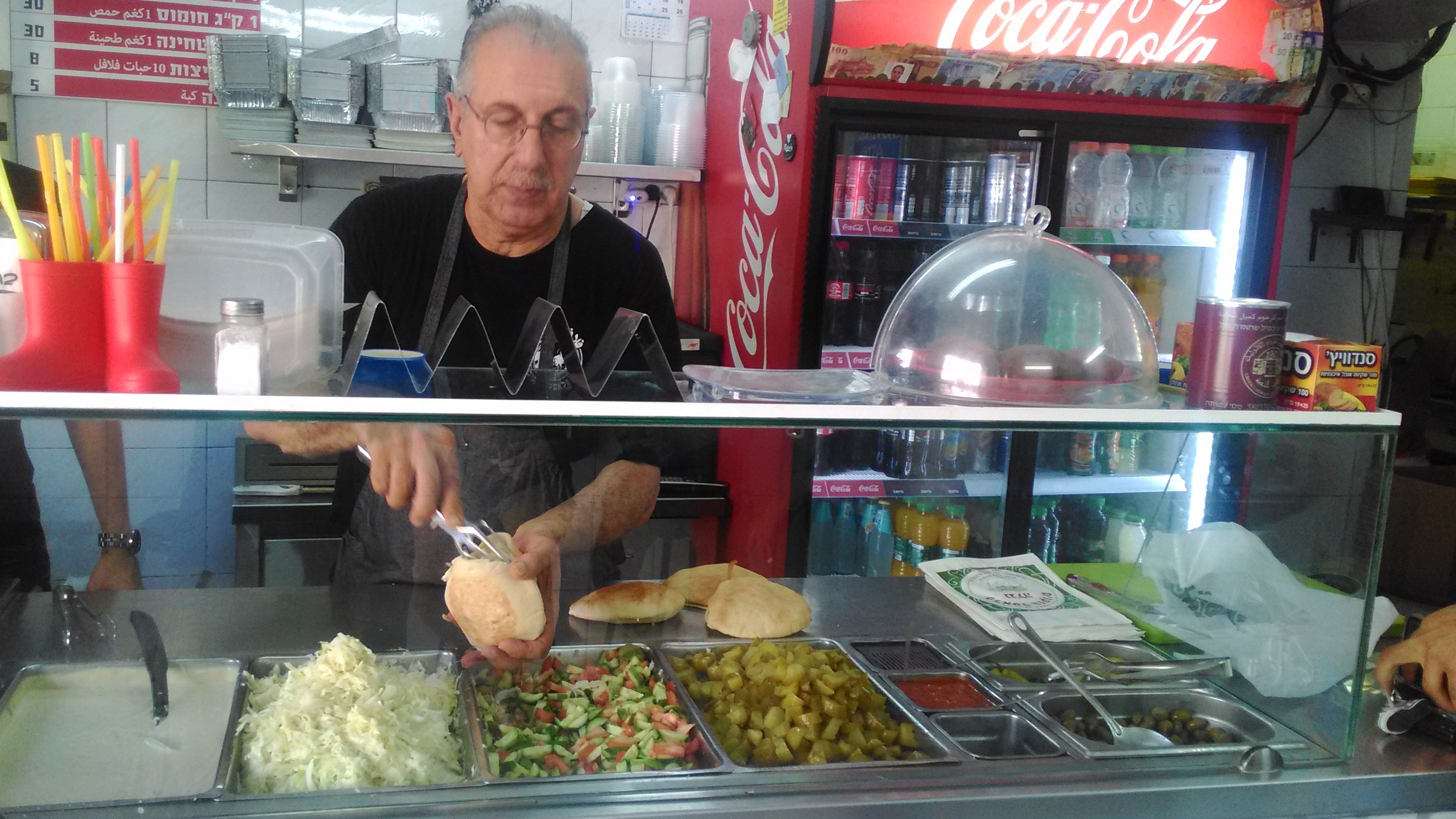
The owner fills a pita with falafel at Falafel HaZkenim.

- Falafel HaZkenim, Haifa – famous Israeli falafel restaurant. Briefly had a branch.
- Maayan Habira – Haifa butcher shop and smokehouse from 1950. In 1962 became a tavern and Polish restaurant.
- MacDavid – started in 1978 as a hamburger restaurant in Tel Aviv, grew to 28 branches nationwide, now one restaurant in Haifa.
- HaOgen, Haifa – founded 1942, this is Israel's oldest pub.
- Yonk – Romanian grill, founded in 1948 as a Haifa ice cream factory by the Milstein family.

=== Tel Aviv & Center ===
- Anastasia – vegan restaurant in Tel Aviv, founded in 2014
- Mashya – fine dining in Tel Aviv, founded in 2015
- Herbert Samuel – Kosher fine-dining in Herzliya, formerly a chain of 3 restaurants.
- Olympus – Greek restaurant in Tel Aviv, founded in 1932. Israel's oldest restaurant at present.
- Dr. Shakshuka – Libyan restaurant at the Yafo Flea Market, founded by Bino Gabso in 1991. Had a short-lived branch in the 1990s.
- Shmulik Cohen – oldest restaurant in Tel Aviv still operating at its original location, serving kosher Ashkenazi cuisine.

=== Jerusalem & South ===
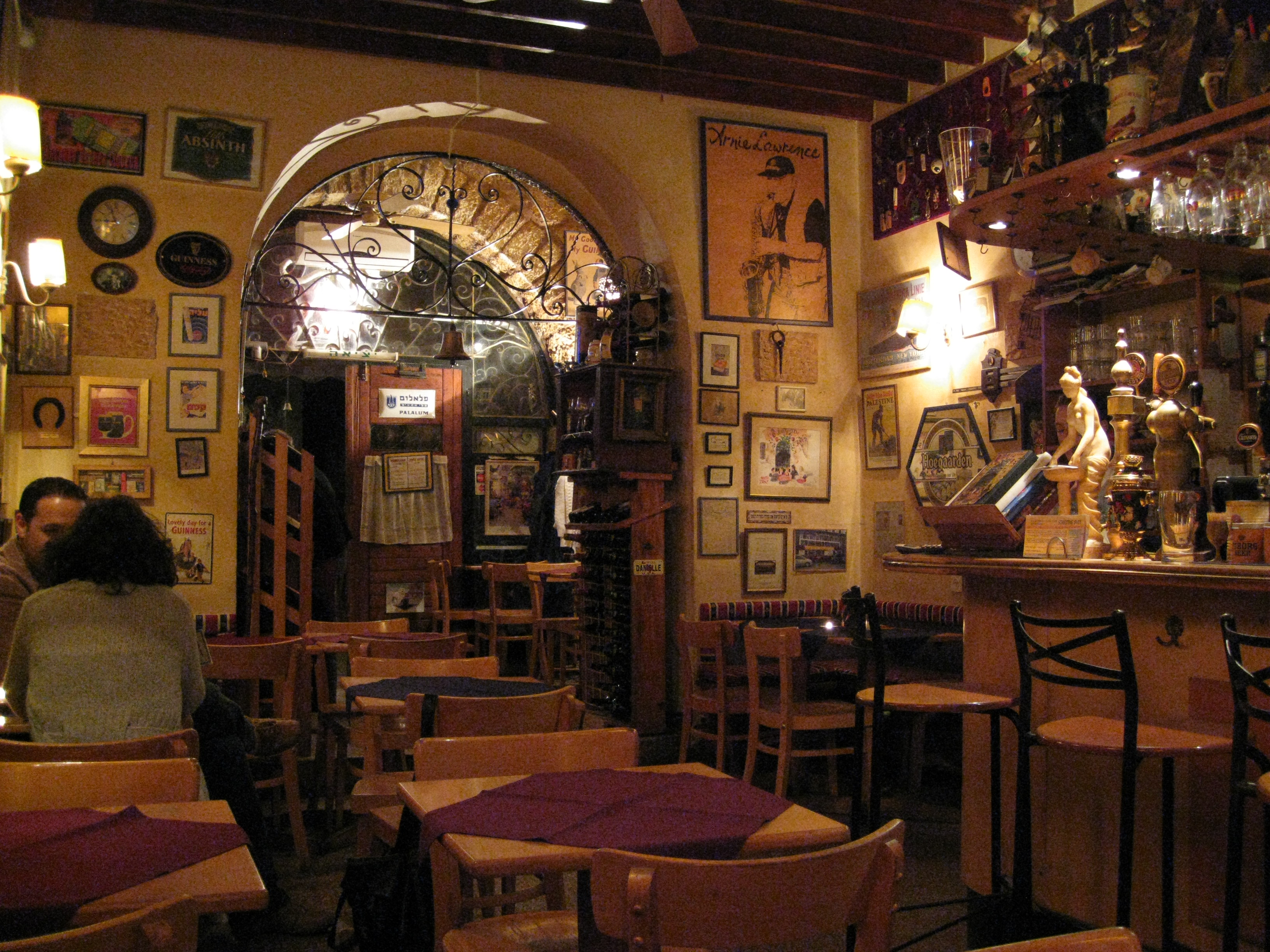
Barood, Jerusalem

- Abu Shukri – name of several, largely unrelated, Mediterranean restaurants in Jerusalem and Abu Ghosh
- Azura - Kosher Middle Eastern restaurant in Jerusalem, founded 1952.
- Beer Sheva Ice Cream – popular ice cream parlor in the Old City of Beersheba, founded in 1950. Had branches for a while.
- Barood – bar-restaurant in Jerusalem serving Sephardic cuisine
- Café Hileni – cafe restaurant in Jerusalem, remnant of the Café Hillel chain that closed down in 2003
- Eucalyptus – kosher meat restaurant in Jerusalem
- Yakuta – Moroccan restaurant in Beersheba since 1965.

=== No longer operating ===
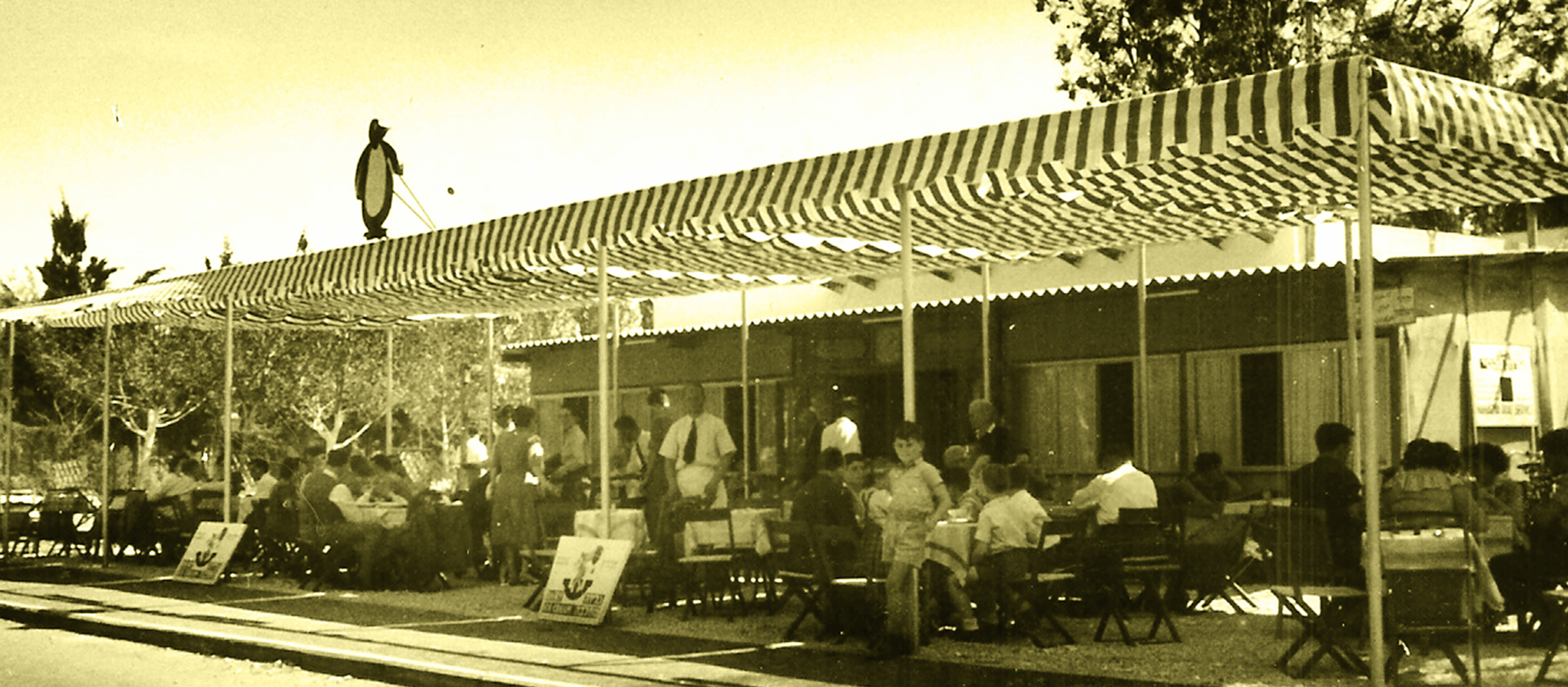
Penguin, Nahariya in the 1950s

- Café Kassit – legendary cafe in Tel Aviv
- Mișu King of the Kebab - Romanian cuisine in Jaffa.
- Mul Yam – restaurant that was located in Tel Aviv Port. It was founded in 1995 and burned down in 2015.
- Nizahon Restaurant – Romanian grill in Ashkelon, founded in 1949, closed in 2019
- Penguin – German-Israeli family restaurant from 1940 to 2022 in Nahariya
- Sami VeSusu – Romanian cuisine restaurant from 1970 to 2019 at the municipal market of Beersheba
- Spaghettim – Italian cuisine in Petach Tikva. Was a chain with 17 restaurants nationwide in 2010.

== See also ==
- Israeli cuisine
- Kosher restaurant
- List of companies of Israel
- List of kosher restaurants
- Lists of restaurants
