= Cofix =

Coffee shop chain founded in Israel

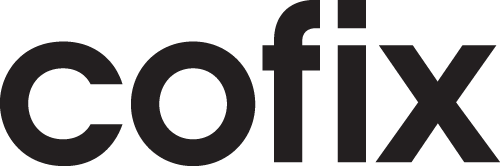

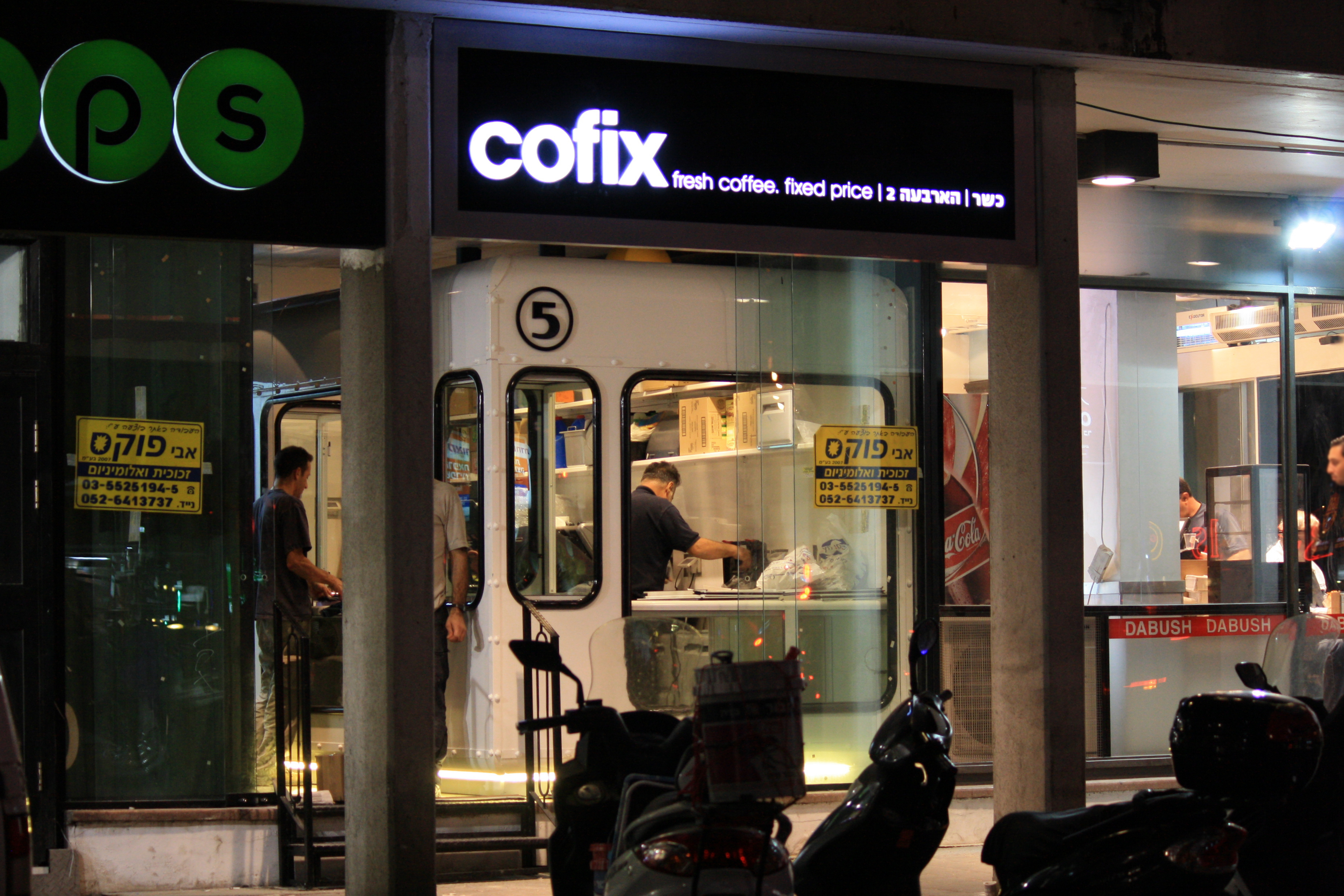
- Cofix, HaArba'a Street, Tel Aviv
- Type: Public
- Traded as: TASE: CFX
- Industry: Coffee shops
- Founded: 2013; 13 years ago
- Founder: Avi Katz; Benny Farkas
- Headquarters: Tel Aviv
- Number of locations: Israel: 145 (2019); Poland: 17 (2023); Kazakhstan: 1 (2022); Russia: 277 (2022); Belarus: 45 (2022); Spain: 1 (2023); Armenia: 3 (2024)
- Key people: Ron Efraty (Chairman); Blazej Reiss (CEO); Shaun M. Lewis (COO)
- Operating income: NIS 287 million (2018)
- Owners: Avi Katz; Rami Levy; Benny Farkas; Gil Unger; Hagit Shinover; Hanan Shemesh
- Website: cofix.global

Cofix (Hebrew: קופיקס, a portmanteau of coffee and fix) is an Israeli coffee shop, bar and supermarket chain established in 2013 by Avi Katz, which uses a fixed price menu system. Most Cofix branches are in city centers, and other popular areas, but some are located in or next to educational institutions, such as Haifa University

The chain sells fresh coffee at a fixed and low price, as well as associated food products, under the slogan "fresh coffee, fixed price". The Cofix Bar part of the chain also includes alcoholic beverages, and Super Cofix is a Cofix-based supermarket. The chain originally offered all of its products at a fixed price of NIS 5 ($1.55), including in the bar and supermarket branches,

Cofix Israel is listed on the Tel Aviv Stock Exchange under AGRI. Upon its entrance into the stock market, it was valued at NIS 90 million (~$28 million). As such, Cofix became the first coffee shop chain to be listed at TASE. In 2018, Cofix was acquired by Rami Levy Hashikma Marketing.

== History ==
=== Israel ===
Cofix's entrance into the market caused a significant reduction in take-away coffee prices in Israel, notably in the Aroma Espresso Bar chain, which was forced to reduce take-away coffee prices. Some stores and chains reduced prices on coffee, sandwiches, and other products similar to Cofix's to NIS 5 to compete. This has been termed the Cofix Effect in major mass media outlets. Cofix's entry into the market has been compared to the "cellular revolution" which took place in Israel a few years prior and saw massive reductions in cellular communication prices.

Cofix's business model has led to a number of competitors, but as of 2015, only the Cofizz chain has remained as a major competitive force in the same market segment. The major coffee and fast casual restaurant chains, such as Aroma Espresso Bar, Café Café and others, also compete with Cofix. In late 2013, the Israel Antitrust Authority investigated claims that these chains coordinated prices in order to hurt Cofix's position.

Cofix operates both directly and through franchisees. Its first franchise was granted in March 2015 for the King George Street branch in Tel Aviv. In 2015, it entered the Tel Aviv Stock Exchange through the shelf corporation AGRI. The public owns 15.5% of the company. In January 2016, Cofix partnered with Israeli burger chain Burgeranch that would see Cofix products sold next to Burgeranch ones.

Cofix was set to open a factory in Yavne for supplying the chain with 13,000 sandwiches each day.

In June 2015, Cofix opened a supermarket chain, called Super Cofix, that contains a relatively small number of common items sold at competing chains, in smaller packages so they can be sold for a fixed price of NIS 5. The business model calls for a gross profit of 22–23%. Some major manufacturers, such as Tnuva, created new packaging lines to be able to supply Super Cofix.

In February 2017, Cofix raised its fixed price to NIS 6 per item, and in December 2017 the scheme was changed yet again to a variation of prices, mostly either NIS 5 for smaller items and NIS 8 for larger items.

In January 2018, 20% of Cofix was purchased by Rami Levy Hashikma Marketing. In June 2018, Cofix announced a streamlining plan, following a Q1 2018 loss of NIS 5.4 million. In July 2018, Rami Levi's share of the company increased to 50.01%, making him the majority stakeholder. In January 2020, Rami Levi acquired the sweets store chain Little Switzerland through Cofix.

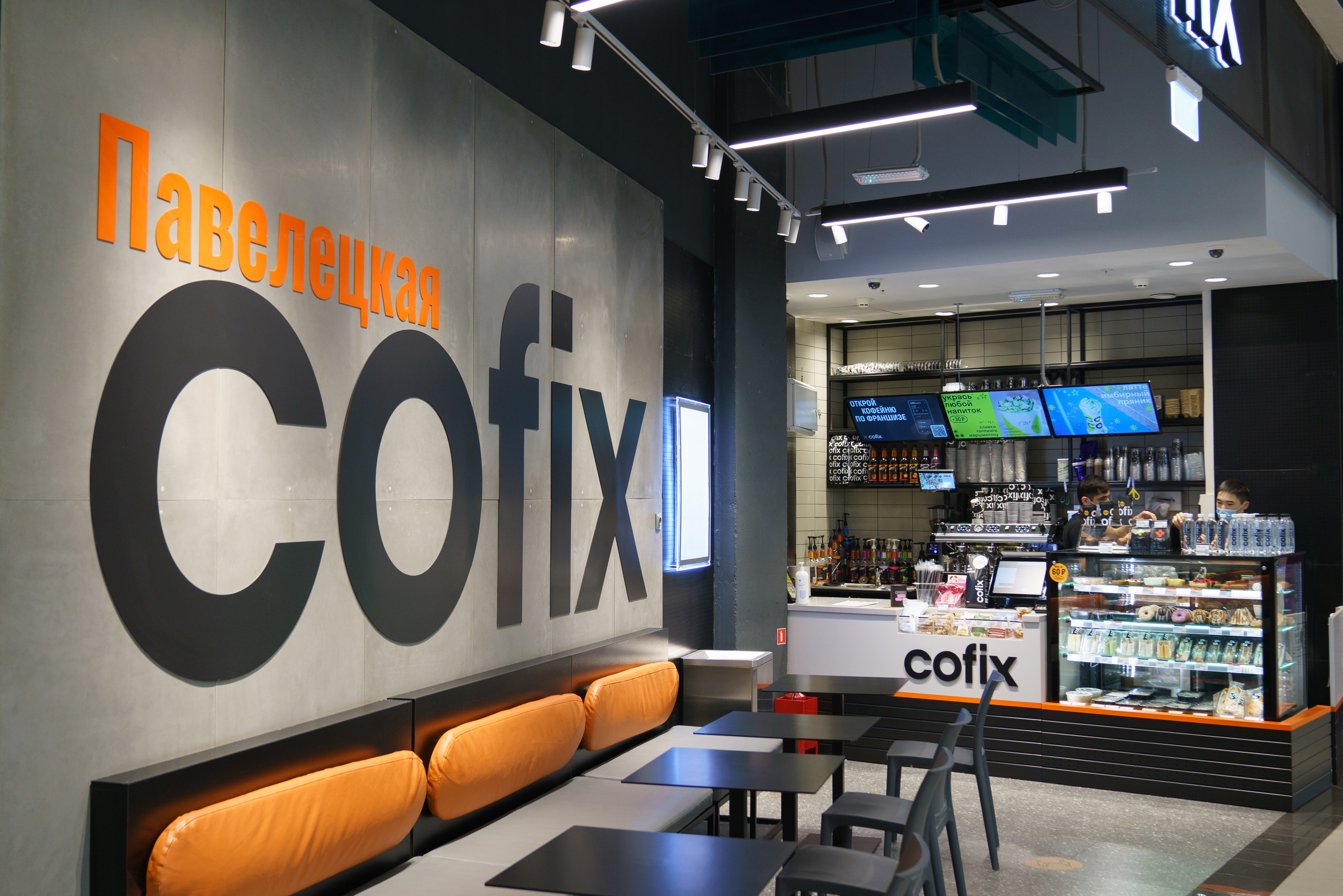
Cofix in Moscow

=== Russia ===
With the help of Russian investors, Cofix opened its first store in Moscow near the Red Square in October 2016. The investment in Russia totaled $2 million as of December 2016. By late 2017 the chain had 39 stores in Moscow, and four in Saint Petersburg.

In 2018, the turnover of Cofix in Russia was estimated at 2 billion rubles. Due to the rapid growth in Russia, Cofix became the leader in relative growth rates among European coffeehouses according to «FoodService Europe & Middle East» magazine.

In 2019, the Russian Cofix was estimated as the sixth largest coffeehouse chain in the country. In July 2019 Forbes Russia listed Cofix among TOP-10 most profitable franchises costing between 5 and 25 million rubles. At the end of the year Cofix launches a vegan product line designed for people adopting healthy and responsible lifestyle.

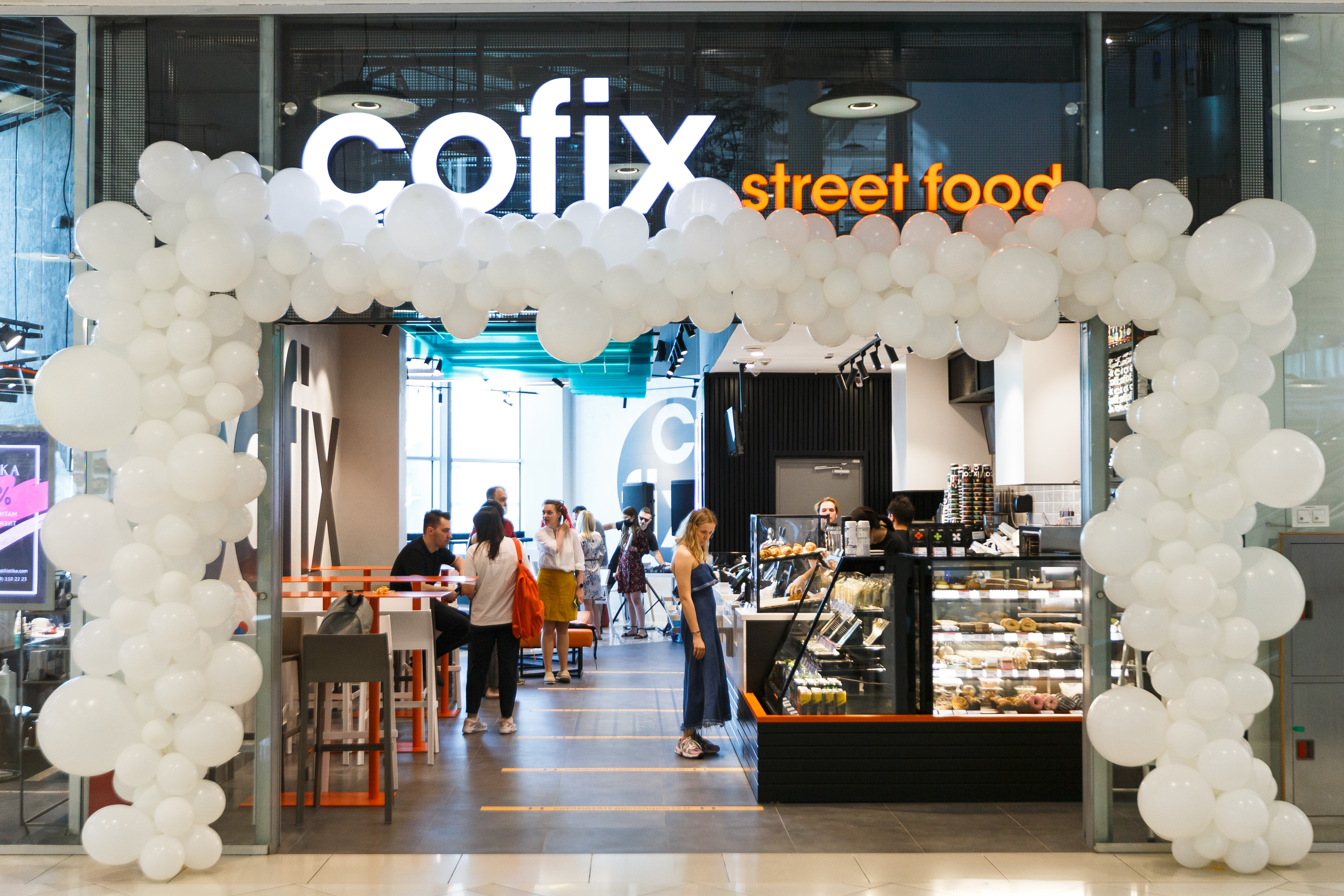
Cofix Street Food

In 2021, Cofix opened its first new concept ‘Cofix street food' store and came in second in the rating of coffee chains with highest levels of customer loyalty.

In 2022, the Russian Cofix remains one of market leaders and consists of more than 270 coffee shops located in Moscow, Saint Petersburg and Irkutsk, Ekaterinburg, Kazan, Sochi, Tula, Nizhniy Novgorod, Samara, and Ivanovo. The coffee chain is actively developing in the regions by opening stores in other cities.

=== Belarus ===
The first Cofix coffee shops in Belarus opened in 2019. By 2022 the local chain expanded to more than 30 outlets. According to the Project Café Europe 2022 report, published by the Allegra World Coffee Portal, Cofix became the largest branded coffee chain in Belarus.

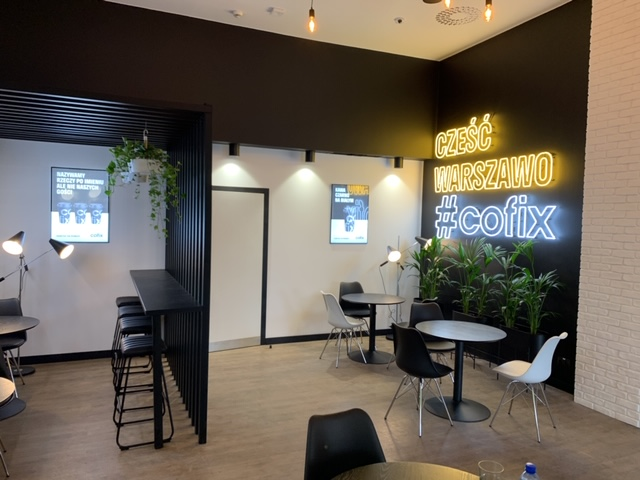
Cofix in Warsaw

=== Poland ===
The first Cofix coffee shop was opened in Warsaw in 2020 on Świętokrzyska Street. Despite the COVID-19 pandemic, Cofix remained on the market and successfully continued to open new stores. Currently, the Polish branch has 18 outlets, 7 of which is franchised. Allegra Project Cafe Europe 2023 ranked Cofix among the top 10 largest branded coffee shop chains in the country.

As in other countries, Cofix in Poland uses a fixed price menu system. Here they sell coffee, freshly prepared sandwiches, cakes and other types of desserts for 8, 12, 14, 16, 18 and 20 zlotys. Several coffee shops also offer freshly prepared breakfast and handmade ice cream.

=== Spain ===
The first Cofix coffee shop in Spain was opened in Valencia in September 2023.

== Controversy ==
Cofix has waged a battle against its main Israeli competitor, Cofizz. Cofix claims that the latter plagiarized its logo and exploited the success of its brand, while Cofizz founders claim that they worked for Cofix without a salary and in exchange for unfulfilled franchise promises, which forced them to open a competing chain. The battle has reached the Israeli court system.

== See also ==
- Economy of Israel
- List of restaurants in Israel
