= Barood =

Barood may refer to:

- Gunpowder, which is known as "barood" or "barud" in various languages
- Barood (1960 film), a Bollywood film of 1960 starring Kumkum
- Barood (1976 film), an Indian Hindi-language film by Pramod Chakravorty starring Rishi Kapoor and Reena Roy
- Barood (1998 film), an Indian Hindi-language film starring Akshay Kumar and Raveena Tandon
- Barood (2000 film), a Pakistani film of 2000
- Barood (2003 film), an Indian Assamese-language film
- Barood (2004 film), an Indian Bengali-language film starring Mithun Chakraborty, Usha Sree, Lokesh and Rajatava Dutt
- Barood: Man On Mission, Hindi title of the 2004 Indian Telugu-language film Andhrawala
- Barood (restaurant), a bar-restaurant in Jerusalem

== See also ==
- Barud, village in Iran
