= MacDavid =

Israeli fast food restaurant brand

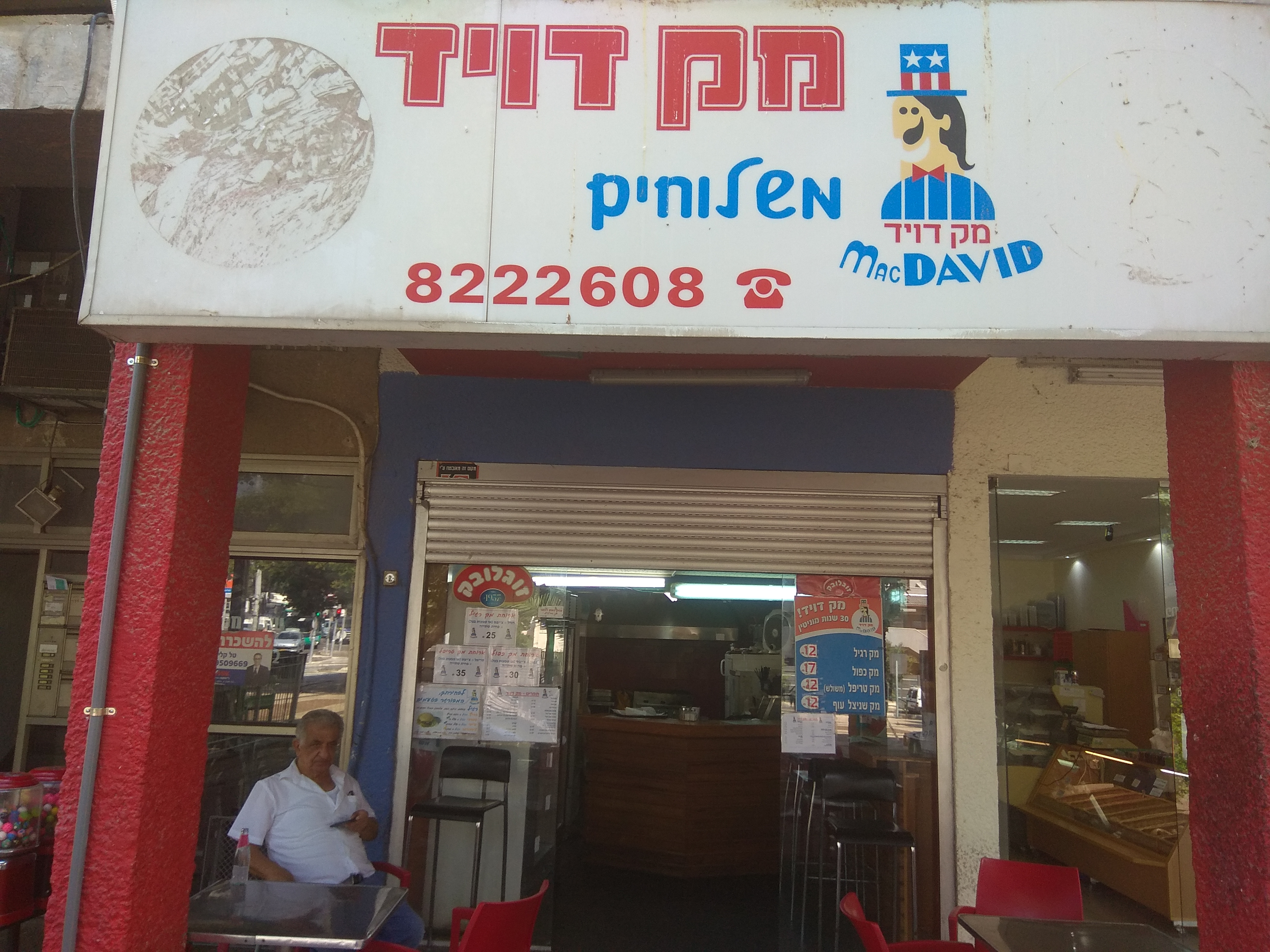
- Native name: מק דויד
- Industry: Fast-food restaurant
- Founded: MacDavid was founded in 1978; 48 years ago MacDavid Haifa stems from 1982; 44 years ago
- Headquarters: Haifa, Israel
- Number of locations: 1 (28 in 1989)
- Area served: Israel

MacDavid (Hebrew: מק דויד) is an Israeli fast food brand, that started in 1978 in Tel Aviv. After growing to the peak of 28 branches, most branches have closed, leaving one location, in Haifa.

== History ==
The original branch was opened in 1978 on Tel Aviv's Frishman Street. In 1979 McDonald's sued MacDavid over name infringement. MacDavid claimed its name was dissimilar, but stopped serving "Big Macs".

MacDavid expanded to a peak of 28 in 1989. In 1993 McDonald's entered the market, and competitor Burgeranch expanded its presence, causing the number of MacDavid restaurants to decline. By the year 2000 only four restaurants remained, with the locations in Eilat and Haifa still open by the end of 2010.

In 2011 a new MacDavid company opened a branch in Nazareth Illit. This new and unrelated MacDavid was unsuccessful and the restaurant closed down.

Since sometime in the early 2010s, the Haifa branch of the original chain, opened 1982, on Trumpeldor Boulevard, continues to operate as MacDavid's sole location.

== See also ==
- Culture of Israel
- Israeli cuisine
- Economy of Israel
- List of restaurants in Israel
