= Burgers Bar =

Israeli burger chain

Burgers Bar (בורגרס בר)
- Industry: Fast-food restaurant
- Founded: Israel (1999; 27 years ago)
- Headquarters: Israel
- Number of locations: 30
- Area served: Israel, United States
- Products: Hamburgers, chicken, french fries, soft drinks
- Website: www.burgersbar.co.il

Burgers Bar (Hebrew: בורגרס בר Burgers Bar) is an Israeli burger chain with 30 locations around Israel, and previously had three locations in the United States.

== History ==
Burgers Bar opened their first location in 1999 in the German Colony of Jerusalem. Due to the restaurants popularity, they began expanding quickly all over Israel. Burgers Bar was able to carve out a niche for themselves and in 2005 became the only nominee in Haaretz's Best Kosher Burger in Israel. Many attribute Burgers Bar's success to them offering burgers at a similar price to McDonald's Israel.

All locations are kosher Mehadrin certified. Additionally they offer a wide variety of toppings and side dishes not found at typical burger restaurants.

== American expansion attempt ==
After experiencing success in Israel with the American tourists, Burgers Bar expanded to the United States with 3 locations. The locations were in Teaneck, Cedarhurst, and Brooklyn however all three locations were closed within a couple of years.

In a new attempt to expand in the United States, Burgers Bar has opened in February 25th a new branch in Brooklyn.

== See also ==
- Culture of Israel
- Israeli cuisine
- Economy of Israel
- List of hamburger restaurants
- List of restaurants in Israel
