= HaShamen =

Israeli restaurant chain

HaShamen (הַשָׁמֵן)
- Industry: Fast-food restaurant
- Founded: Israel (2006; 20 years ago)
- Headquarters: Israel
- Number of locations: 7 (January 2023)
- Area served: Israel
- Products: Shawarma
- Website: hashamen.co.il

HaShamen (Hebrew: הַשָׁמֵן - lit. The Fat Guy) is an Israeli restaurant chain that sells Shawarma and other Middle Eastern food 7 branches across Israel. HaShamen opened its first restaurant in 2006.

== Concept ==
HaShamen has corporate owned locations and franchises.

HaShamen's menu is simplified with very few options. Shawarma is their main product with the option of turkey or lamb meat. The only other options offered are salad, humus platters and falafel.

All of the products sold at HaShamen facilities come kosher certified by the Beit Shemesh Kosher's Rabbi Mutzafi.

The chain grew to 11 branches in December 2018 than shrank to 7 in January 2023.

== See also ==
- Culture of Israel
- Israeli cuisine
- Economy of Israel
- List of restaurants in Israel
