= Café Café =

Coffee shop chain in Israel

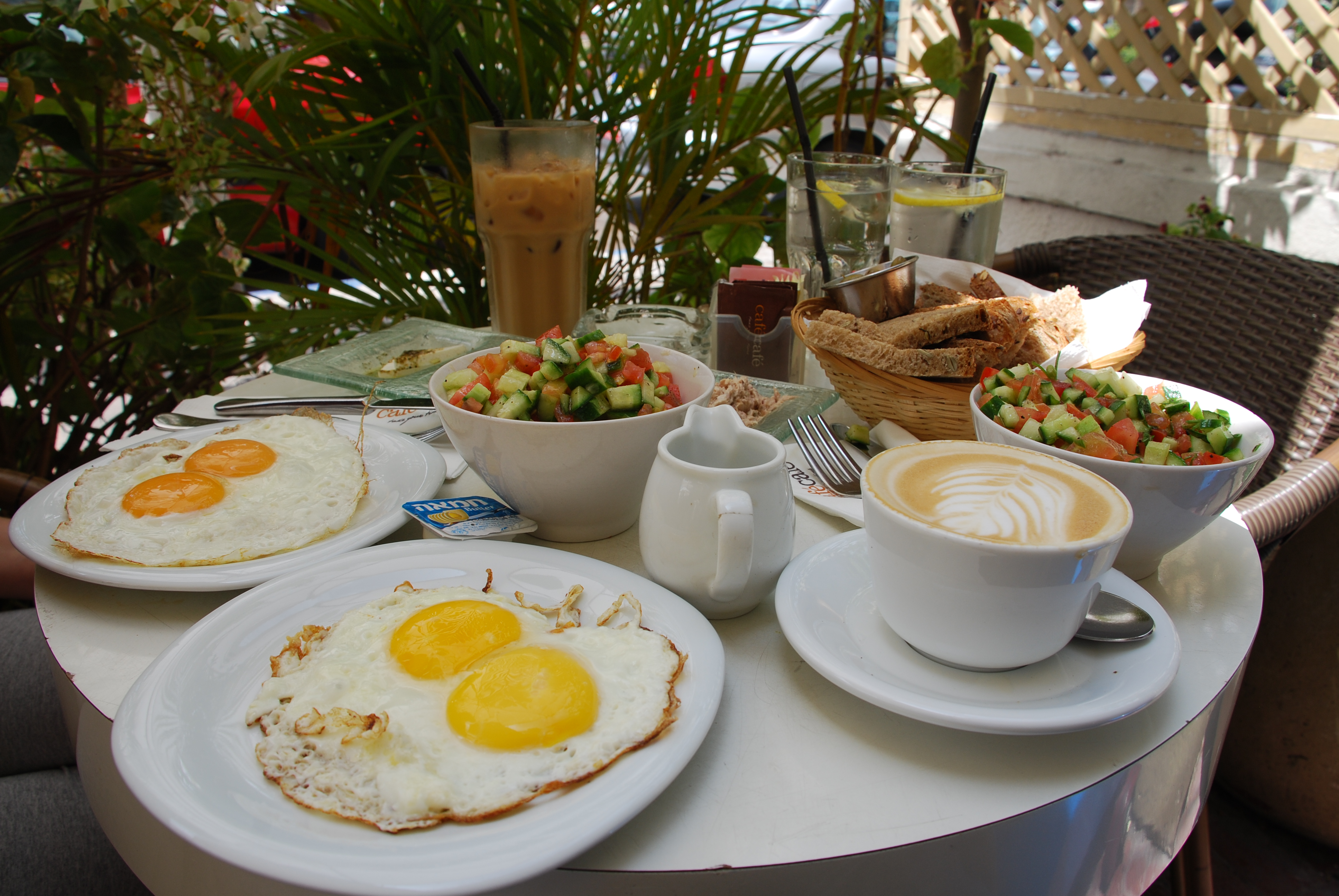
- Israeli breakfast served at Café Café
- Industry: Café chain
- Founded: 2001; 25 years ago
- Number of locations: ~65
- Area served: Israel
- Products: Hot beverages
- Website: Cafecafe.co.il

Café Café (Hebrew: קפה קפה) is a chain of cafés in Israel. In February 2010, Café Café had 112 locations, making it the largest coffee chain in the country at the time, overtaking Aroma Espresso Bar.

== History ==
Café Café was founded in 2001 in Israel. The chain expanded in 2010 to 112 branches, becoming the largest coffee shop chain in Israel.

In 2016, about 12% of Israelis said that Café Café was their favorite chain. In January 2023, about 65 branches operate, down from about 150.

== See also ==
- List of restaurants in Israel
- Economy of Israel
- Israeli cuisine
