= Aroma Espresso Bar =

Israeli coffee shop chain

Aroma Espresso Bar Ltd.
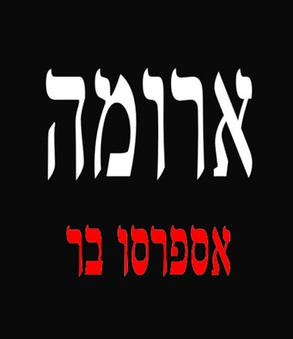
- Industry: Food and beverage; Coffeehouse
- Founded: Israel (1994; 32 years ago)
- Founder: Yariv and Sahar Shefa
- Headquarters: Beit Shemesh, Israel
- Number of locations: 162
- Products: espresso bar
- Website: Aroma Israel; Aroma Canada; Aroma US

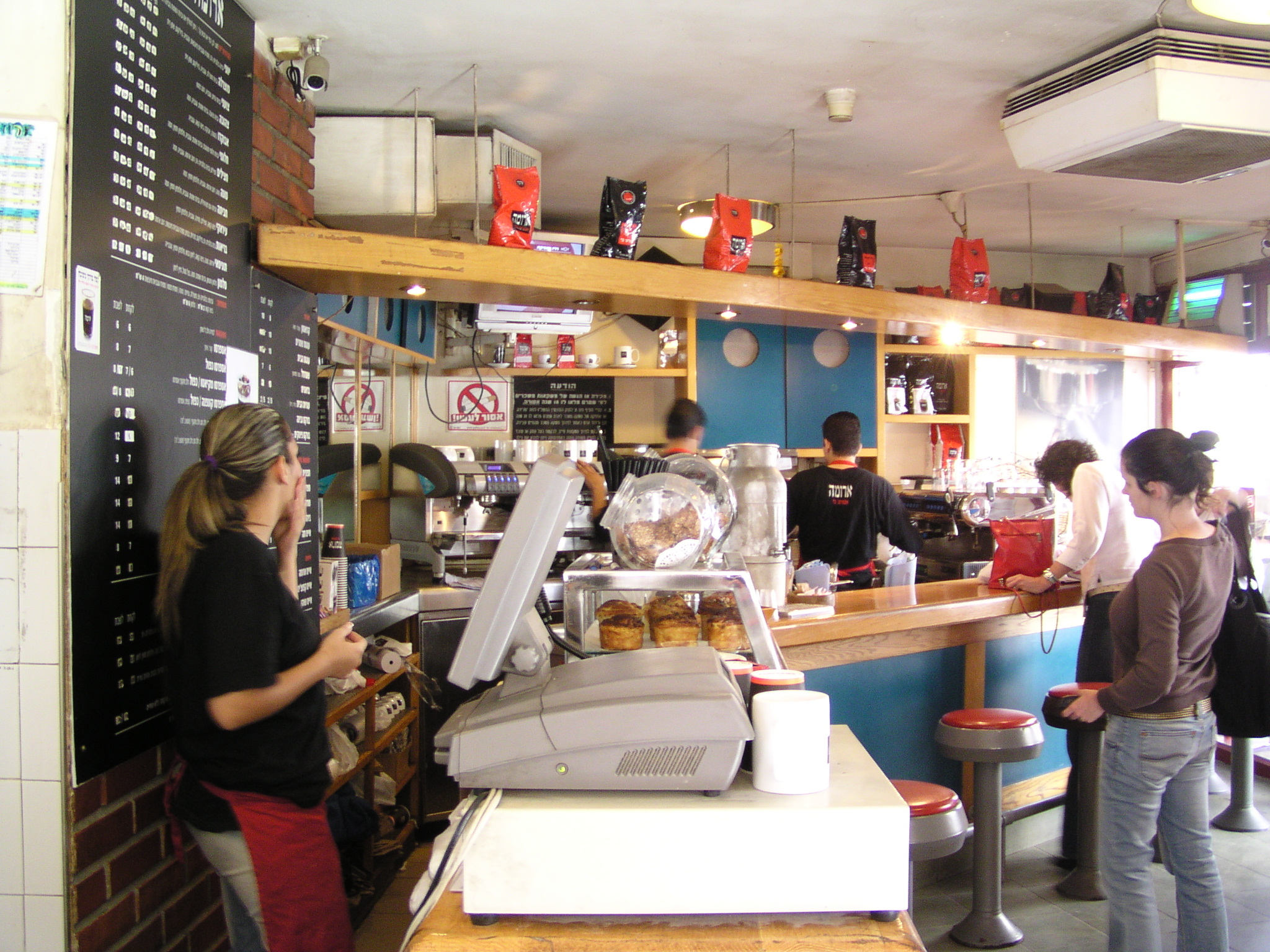
The first Aroma on Hillel Street in Jerusalem (2006).

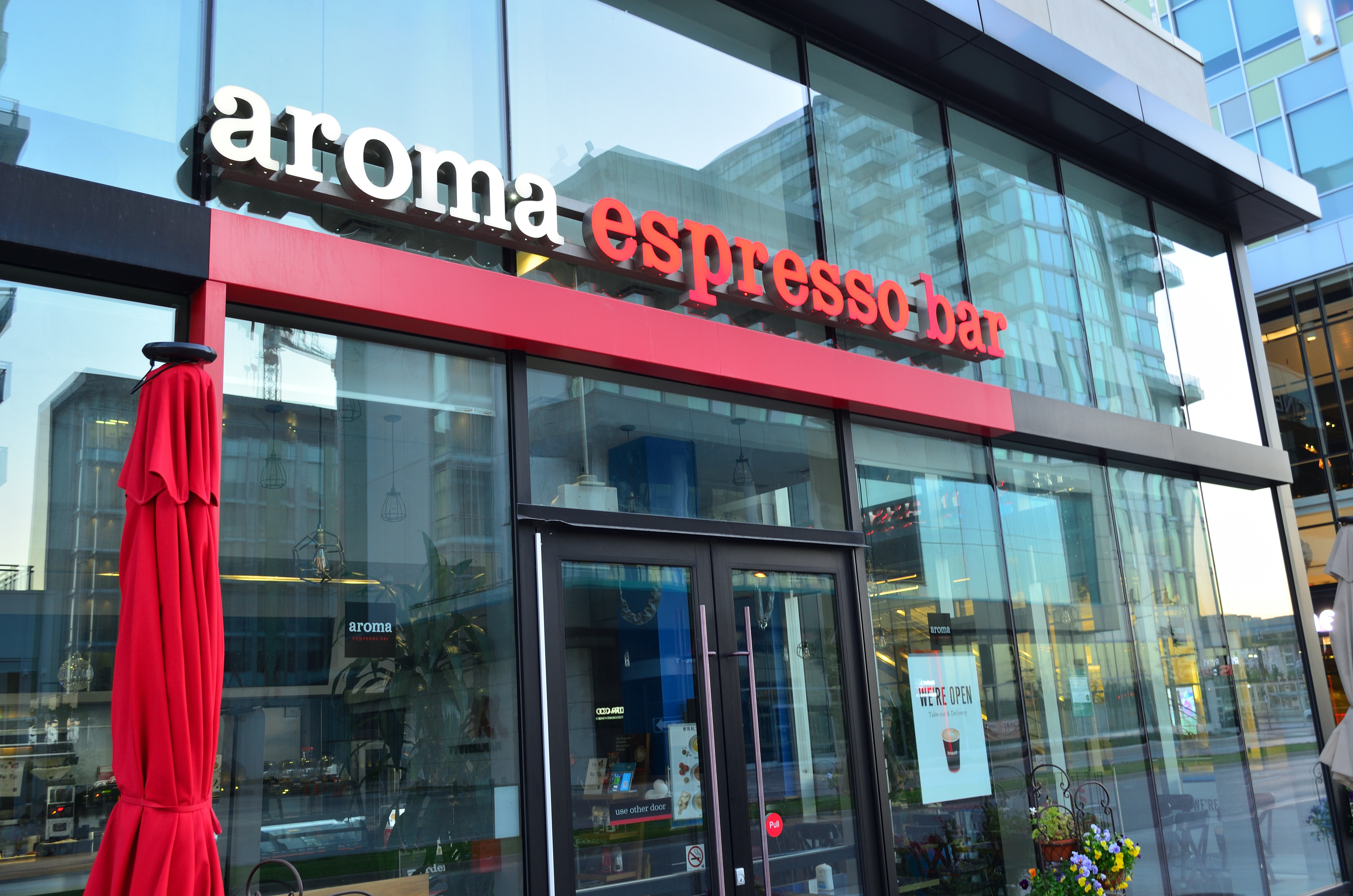
Aroma Espresso Bar in the Greater Toronto Area

Aroma Espresso Bar (Hebrew: ארומה אספרסו בר), or simply Aroma, is an Israeli coffeehouse chain with 162 locations around the country, and several locations in the United States, Canada, and Ukraine.

== History ==
Founded in 1994 on Hillel Street in downtown Jerusalem by brothers Yariv and Sahar Shefa, Aroma first started branching out beyond that city in 2000, following a 1999 dispute between the two brothers which led to the formation of separate chains, Aroma Tel Aviv (run by Sahar) operating in Tel Aviv-Yafo, and Aroma Israel (run by Yariv) operating in the rest of the world. Despite being separate companies, the two chains maintain similar branding, creating a misconception of being a common entity, up to the point that Aroma Israel put labels on its products emphasizing the lack of "business, logistical or management links" between the two following a food poisoning incident in an Aroma Tel Aviv branch.

In 2006 the first overseas branch opened in SoHo in New York City. In 2007 Aroma opened its first location in Canada, in downtown Toronto in The Annex. In the following years, branches continued to open in Toronto, as well as the first location in Kyiv, Ukraine. Aroma has 46 Canadian locations in Ontario (mostly in the Greater Toronto Area), as well as in Florida (2). Aroma has since closed its locations in New York City and Maryland.

In 2021, Aroma Tel Aviv and Aroma Israel were merged under the name Aroma Espresso Bar. The merged company decided to be operated under the current owner, Yariv Shefa.

== Social responsibility ==
In 1996, Aroma's first branch in Jerusalem began integrating workers with special needs. Today the chain employs such people in nearly every branch in the country.

In March 2022, Aroma donated 1 million dollars to Michal Sela Forum, an organization that seeks to prevent domestic violence. Part of the donation was given a project by the organization in which guard dogs are given to high risk threaten women.

== Comparison surveys ==
A survey by an Israeli market research company found that more Israeli consumers are inclined to choose a cafe based on accessibility and availability, ahead of cost and taste of the food. According to Haaretz newspaper, this may explain the success of Aroma, which has 153 outlets in Israel. Respondents were asked which chain they thought had the cheapest prices and best service. Aroma won by a wide margin.

== See also ==
- Café Café
- Café Hillel
- Cofix
- Economy of Israel
- List of coffeehouse chains
- List of restaurants in Israel
