= Roladin =

Bakery chain in Israel

Roladin (רולדין)
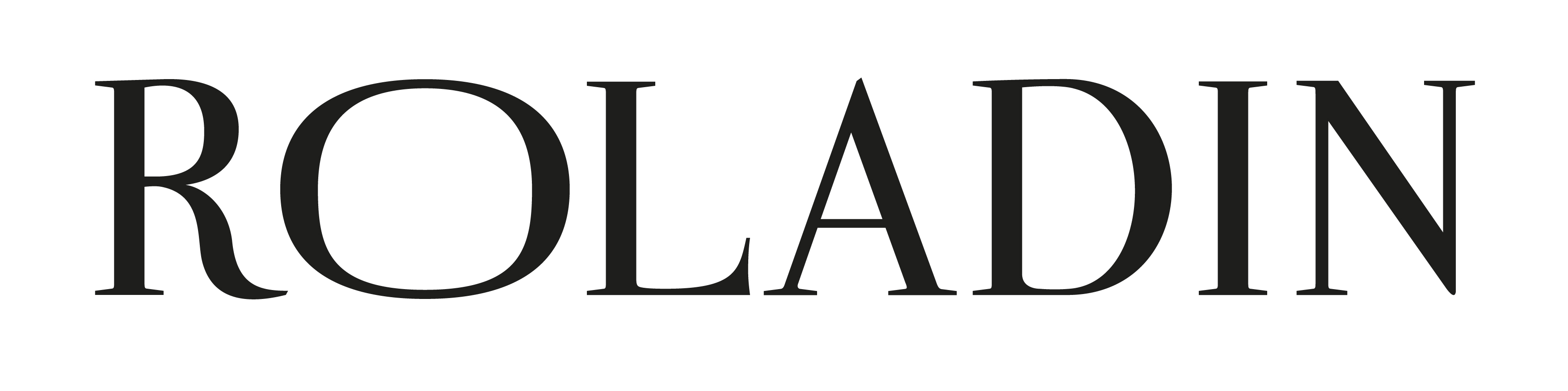

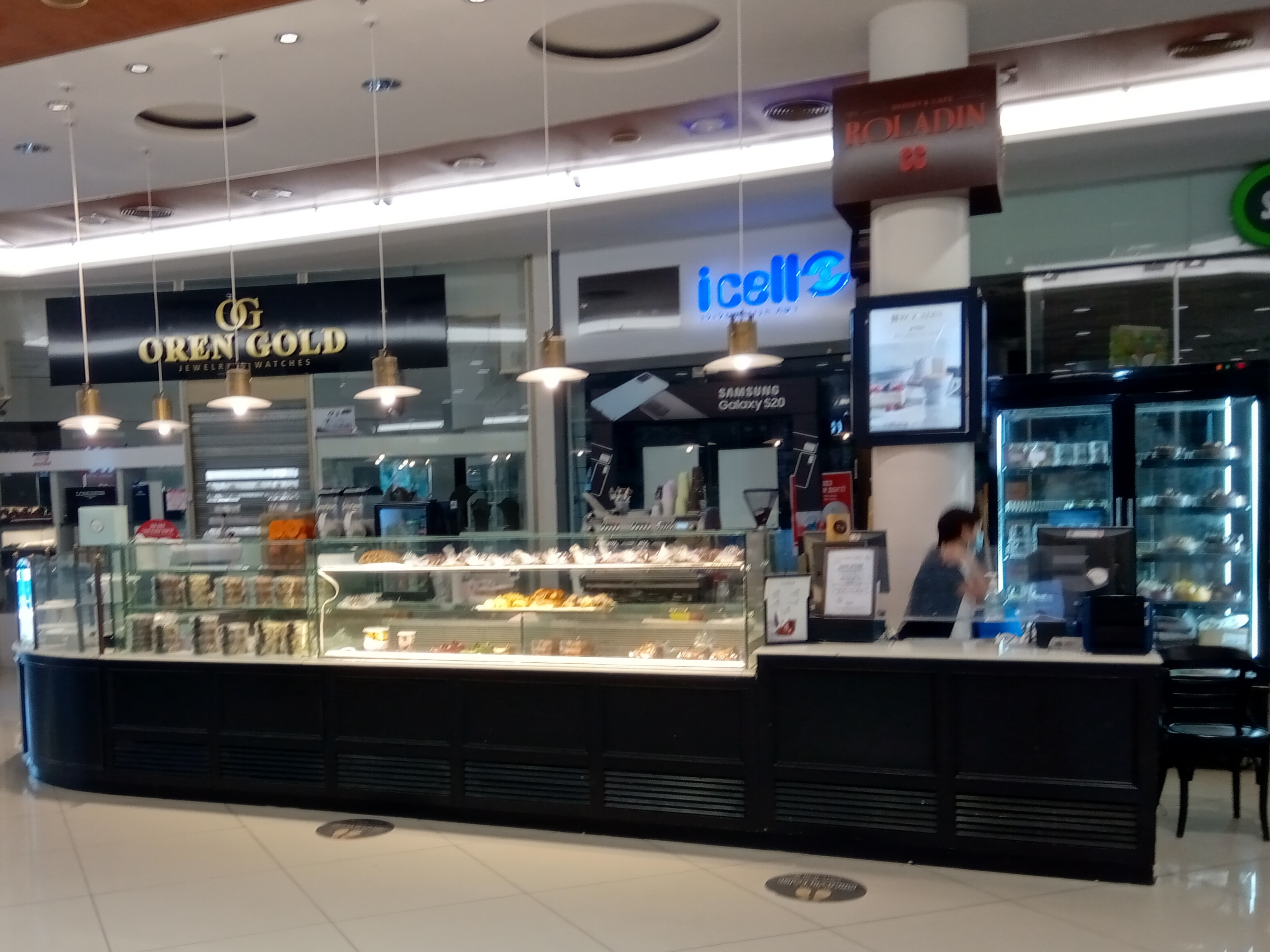
- Founded: Ramat HaSharon (1989; 37 years ago)
- Headquarters: Israel
- Number of locations: 104
- Area served: Israel
- Key people: CEO – Kobi Hakak; Owner – Golan Einat
- Website: http://www.roladin.co.il/

Roladin or Roladin Bakery & Café (Hebrew: רולדין) is the largest bakery chain in Israel, with 104 locations around Israel.

== History ==
The concept for Roladin was created in 1987 by two brothers Kobi and Avi Hakak. Homemade cakes were sold from door to door, since they had no physical location.

In 1989 they opened a their first retail shop in Ramat HaSharon. Menashe Hakak, the two brothers’ father, built the counters and the shelves for the store himself. The recipes for the baked goods were from various sources including their sister-in-law, aunt and neighbors. As the business expanded, Kobi ran the business, and Avi led new products after completing advanced confectionery courses in France and Belgium. Their brother Dudi manages overseas the different locations.

As of August 2014 Roladin had 43 locations around Israel. Some still owned by the Hakak family, while others are franchised. They have expanded considerably in the past few years, growing from 15 branches in 2005. In 2011, Roladin announced plans to add 30 suburban locations by the end of 2013.

The bakery facility is located in Kadima in the Sharon area.

== Other ventures ==
In addition to the cafes, Roladin also provides food to El Al Airlines.

Roladin also sells packaged goods through a partnership with Tnuva.

== Holidays ==
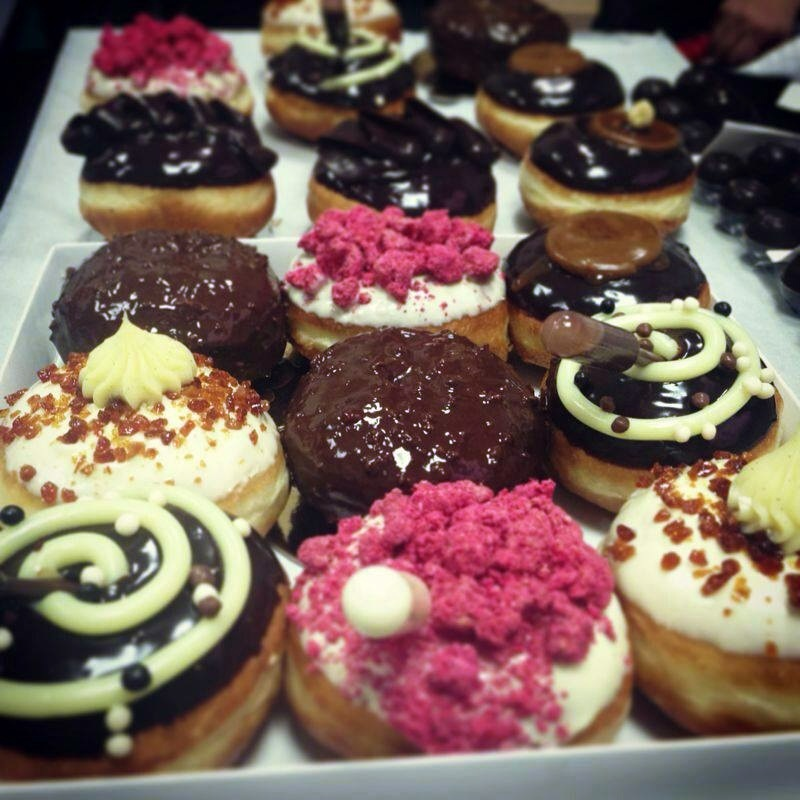
Assorted sufganiyot by Roladin

The Jewish holidays are some of the busiest times for Roladin. Some well known specialty products include:

- Chanukah – Roladin most years wins the competition between Israeli bakeries for the best Sufganiyah. Chanukah is also Roladin's busiest time of the year.
- Purim – Roladin, similar to the Sufganiyah, are usually ranked high in competitions for the best Hamantash.
- Passover – During Passover, Roladin offers a wide selection of Passover desserts
- Rosh HaShana – In honor of the Jewish new year, Roladin offers a wide variety of honey cakes.
- Tu Bishvat – For Tu Bishvat, Roladin carries a wide selection of dried fruit and nuts.
- Shavuot – During Shavuot, Roladin offers a wide range of dairy desserts including cheesecake.

== See also ==
- Israeli cuisine
- List of restaurants in Israel
