= Subway Israel =

Former Israel branch of Subway, an American fast food chain

Subway Israel (סאבוויי)
- Industry: Fast-food restaurant
- Founded: Israel (1992)
- Defunct: 2004
- Headquarters: Israel
- Number of locations: 23 (2004)
- Area served: Israel
- Products: Submarine sandwiches
- Parent: Subway
- Website: Main - isr.subway.com/ Franchising – www.subwayisrael.com/

Subway Israel (Hebrew: סאבוויי) was a fast food sandwich chain, an international franchise of the U.S.-based Subway. Opening in 1992, the chain expanded to 23 branches around Israel before it closed in 2004.

== History ==
In the early 1990s, Subway began expanding their international franchises at a much more rapid pace, with Israel being one of those places.

In 1992 Subway entered Israel for the first time. In 2004, when the original franchisee died, the chain closed their 23 locations. Although not all Subway restaurants in Israel were kosher, all did refrain from pork products.

In May 2009 it was announced that a new investor, Gur Gal, had purchased the franchise rights to Subway in Israel. The new investor had rented space in Herzliya and was in talks to rent additional space in on Rothschild Boulevard in Tel Aviv. His plans stated he would eventually open 130 branches around Israel. The new locations never opened, and a lawsuit between Gur Gal and Subway was settled in arbitration, with no details released.

In June 2014, it was once again announced that Subway was looking to return to Israel and was looking for franchises.

== See also ==
- List of restaurants in Israel
