= Sami VeSusu =

Israeli restaurant serving Romanian food

Sami VeSusu was an Israeli restaurant serving Romanian cuisine at 179 Ohelei Keidar Street in Beersheba, inside the city's municipal market.

== History ==
The restaurant was established in April 1970. It was named after a popular Arabic-language television series that was broadcast in the early days of Israeli television.

Sami VeSusu closed in 2019, shortly after the founder and owner died at the age of 82.

== Concept ==
Sami and Susu was a simple workers' restaurant with formica tables and wooden chairs. On the walls was embroidery from Romania that the founder Marcel Lerer brought with him, when he immigrated to Israel in 1964, and circles resembling beer barrels with advertisements for Goldstar beer.

Sami and Susu was the first restaurant in Beersheba to serve meat by weight. It has been frequented by celebrities, including actors, singers, and politicians.

The restaurant's flagship dishes included Romanian kebabs, brain, oats, veal, chorba and homemade salads ikra and Romanian eggplant salad.
