= Holy Bagel =

Israeli restaurant chain

Holy Bagel (הולי בייגל)
- Industry: Fast-food restaurant
- Founded: Israel (1999; 27 years ago)
- Headquarters: Israel
- Number of locations: 9 (As of November 2016)
- Area served: Israel
- Products: Bagels
- Operating income: NIS 10 million (2009)
- Number of employees: 70 (As of September 2014)
- Website: www.holybagel.com/

Holy Bagel (Hebrew: הולי בייגל) is an Israeli restaurant chain which sells bagel sandwiches, salads, and other light fare.

== History ==
Holy Bagel was founded in 1999 in Jerusalem as an American-style bagel store, by Ari Dubin and Zev Wernick. Both had previously worked in the restaurant business within Israel and knew they could utilize their experience to tap into the bagel market. Their paths first crossed when they both were working at Bonkers Bagels in Jerusalem next door to where they opened their first store. Both had previously made Aliyah from the United States.

In 2002 Holy Bagel opened an additional location on Jaffa Road when Dunkin' Donuts Israel closed in that location. Later their business at this location dropped by over 50% due to the Sbarro restaurant suicide bombing.

Holy Bagel later expanded adding locations in Ramot, Geula Jerusalem Central Bus Station, the Old City, and beyond Jerusalem in Beit Shemesh, Modi'in, Ra'anana and Netanya.

== Locations ==
As of November 2016 Holy Bagel has 9 locations around Israel. All of the locations are franchises.

Holy Bagel runs a catering business that offers service throughout the country, for parties of 60 or more.

Holy Bagel's main factory is located in Talpiot, Jerusalem.

== Kashrut ==
All Holy Bagel locations are kosher Mehadrin.

== See also ==
- Culture of Israel
- Israeli cuisine
- Economy of Israel
- List of restaurants in Israel
