= Big Apple Pizza =

Israeli pizza chain

Big Apple Pizza (ביג אפל פיצה)
- Industry: Fast-food restaurant
- Founded: 1986; 40 years ago
- Founder: Haim Kedem
- Headquarters: Israel
- Number of locations: 11 (2025)
- Area served: Israel
- Products: Pizza
- Website: www.bigapplepizza.co.il/

Big Apple Pizza (Hebrew: ביג אפל פיצה) is an Israeli pizza chain with 11 branches throughout Israel, founded in 1986.

== History ==
Big Apple Pizza was founded in 1986 by Haim Kedem, in the Jerusalem mall, Dorot Rishonim. Kedem had spent many years in New York City and upon moving to Israel decided to open a pizza shop to bring the piece of NYC with him. Kedem's pizza, in traditional NYC fashion was made with a thin crust.

In 1996, Kedem expanded the business outside of Jerusalem for the first time, opening his first pizza shop in Eilat. In 2000, Kedem died and left the business to his two sons, who still run the business.

== Branches ==
The inside of all the Big Apple Pizza locations is set up to remind patrons of the NYC experience. The tables are set up as if to be a New York City café, with pictures of the city. Additionally, they have many American license plates on their walls.

As of April 2025, there are 11 branches of Big Apple Pizza:

- Jerusalem – Ben Yehuda Pedestrian Mall
- Jerusalem – Beit Hakerem
- Jerusalem – Katamon
- Jerusalem – Gilo
- Jerusalem – Ramat Eshkol
- Jerusalem – Givat Shaul
- Azrieli Modi’in Mall
- Gush Etzion
- Eilat
- Mevaseret Zion
- Beit Shemesh

== Kashrut ==
All of Big Apple Pizza's locations throughout Israel are kosher, including those in Eilat, which is primarily secular.

The six Jerusalem locations are Rabbanut Yerushalayim Mehadrin.

== In popular culture ==
In August 2014, Andrew Cuomo, the former Governor of New York, went to Israel to show support for the country during Operation Protective Edge. As part of his trip, Cuomo met with students from New York studying in Israel at Big Apple Pizza.

== See also ==
- Culture of Israel
- Israeli cuisine
- Economy of Israel
- List of pizza chains
- List of restaurants in Israel
