= Black Bar 'n' Burger =

Restaurant chain based in Israel

- Industry: Sit-down restaurant
- Founded: Israel (2004; 22 years ago)
- Headquarters: Israel
- Number of locations: 14 (August 2014)
- Area served: Israel
- Products: Hamburgers
- Website: blackbarburger.co.il/

Black Bar 'n' Burger is an Israeli hamburger and bar chain with 14 locations around the country. The chain provides 12 different burger varieties, all named after people in American pop culture. They provide vegetarian burgers as well as offering gluten-free buns, in an attempt to expand their customer base. The locations have large bars with a wide variety of beers, cocktails and liquor.

== History ==
Black Bar 'n' Burger was founded in 2004 with their first branch opening in Rehovot. The chain became very popular very quickly. They opened their second branch in Herzliya in 2007, before expanding to four branches by 2008. By 2014 they had expanded to 14 branches. Locations are now both owned by Bukshester and franchised.

The chain's owner and head chef is Tzahi Bukshester. He has a cooking TV show on Israel's channel 2 in addition to owning the chain. Bukshester was trained to be a chef in Europe.

== Kashrut ==
Most of Black Bar 'n' Burger's locations are not kosher; however, the locations in Petah Tikva, Jerusalem, and four other locations are.

== See also ==
- Culture of Israel
- Israeli cuisine
- Economy of Israel
- List of restaurants in Israel
- List of hamburger restaurants
