= Nizahon Restaurant =

Former Romanian restaurant in Israel

Coordinates: 31.66414°N 34.58653°E

Nizahon Restaurant (מסעדת הניצחון) was a Romanian grill in Ashkelon and one of Israel's oldest restaurants. The restaurant did not have kashrut certification and was open on Shabbat.

== History ==
Nizahon was founded in 1949, by Yeshayahu "Shaya" Leiboshor, who had just finished his military service. Leiboshor, a descendant of a Jewish-Romanian butcher family, had made aliyah in 1947. The structure and basic needs were paid for with a disability loan that Shaya could secure after his service. The new mayor Ashkelon recommended the name (The) Victory Restaurant, as the 1947–1949 Palestine war was just over. The restaurant started off as a coffee house with a few food choices.

Shaya later put on the roof of the restaurant himself and also worked in construction elsewhere to keep the restaurant running in the 1950s. Eventually, a partner joined, who had been a restaurant regular, and two families operated the restaurant together. It became increasingly successful. The restaurant took a financial hit during the Gaza wars when few customers came in. Also, the deteriorating situation of the pedestrian mall and the increased competition around Ashkelon took their toll. In May 2019, 70 years after its foundation, the restaurant closed down.
