= Papagaio =

Papagaio (פאפאגאיו)
- Industry: Churrascaria
- Founded: Tel Aviv (1997; 29 years ago)
- Headquarters: Israel
- Number of locations: 2
- Area served: Israel
- Website: www.papagaio.co.il/

Papagaio (Hebrew: פאפאגאיו) is a Brazilian steakhouse (churrascaria) restaurant, with two locations in Israel: one in Herzliya and one in Jerusalem. Papagaio, which opened their first location in Tel Aviv in 1997, is a Brazilian steakhouse with kosher menus.

== Concept ==
Their best known option is an all-you-can-eat meal which for a set price includes a salad, bread and unlimited meats. Although the menu varies from day to day, most days provide at least 10–12 different types of meat to choose from. A series of waiters go from table to table with the different selections of meat, allowing diners to try every type for one flat price.

Papagaio also offers a meat sampler.

== Locations ==
As of 2026 there are two locations around Israel:

- Herzliya
- Jerusalem

There used to be locations also in Eilat, Haifa, and Tel Aviv.

== Kashrut ==
Both locations are certified kosher: the Jerusalem location is certified L'Mehadrin by the Orthodox Union and the Herzliya location is under the Rabbanut.
