= Yonk =

Restaurant in Haifa, Israel

Cafe Ice Cream Yonk (Hebrew: קפה גלידה יונק), founded in 1948, is one of Israel's oldest restaurants, located in Haifa. While the name implies otherwise, it is a Romanian grill. The restaurant is located at Kibbutz Galuyot Street 23, adjacent to the Haifa Flea Market on the same street. Their flagship dish is the Romanian kebab.

== History ==
The restaurant was founded in 1948 as a tiny ice cream and popsicle factory, by Yehuda "Yonk" and Yocheved Milstein, who had arrived from Poland. In the back of their factory Romanians from the neighborhood operated a little grill. Impressed by the potential, the Milsteins changed their tiny factory into a Romanian restaurant, serving the cuisine they had learned from the tenants. After Yehuda Milstein's death, the restaurant was continued and perfected by his son-in-law. In 2019 it is managed by the third generation of the founding family.
