= Penguin (restaurant) =

Restaurant in Israel

Coordinates: 33.0065°N 35.0936°E

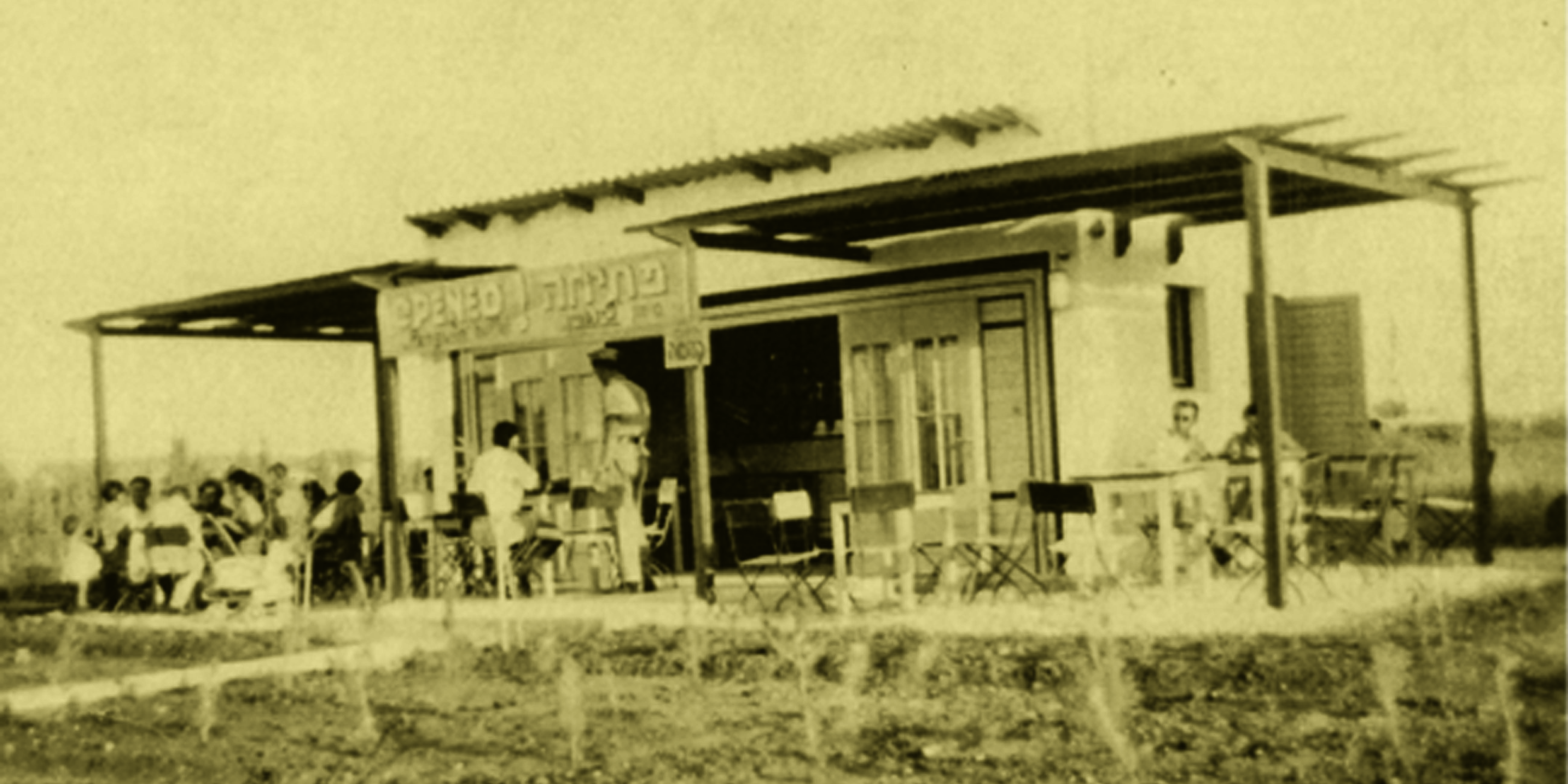
Penguin in the 1940s

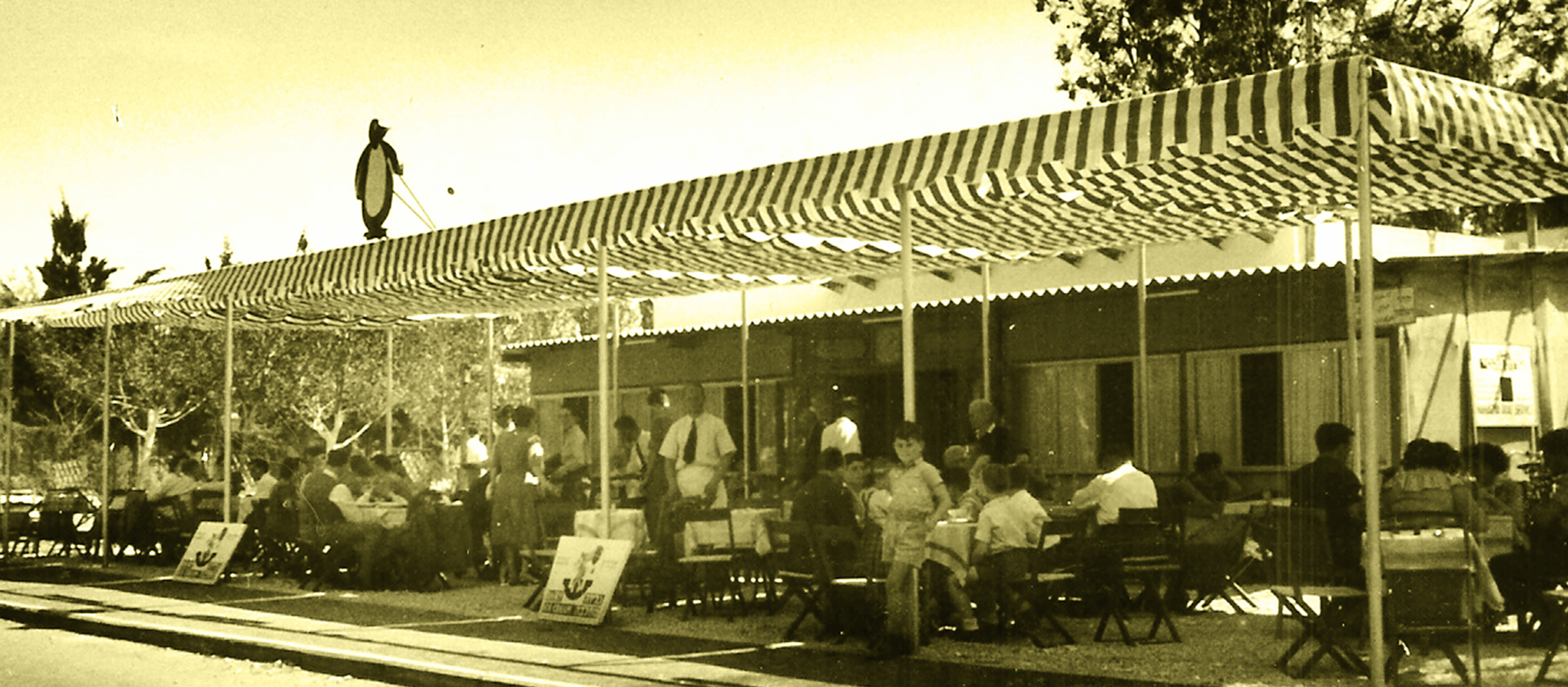
Penguin in the 1950s

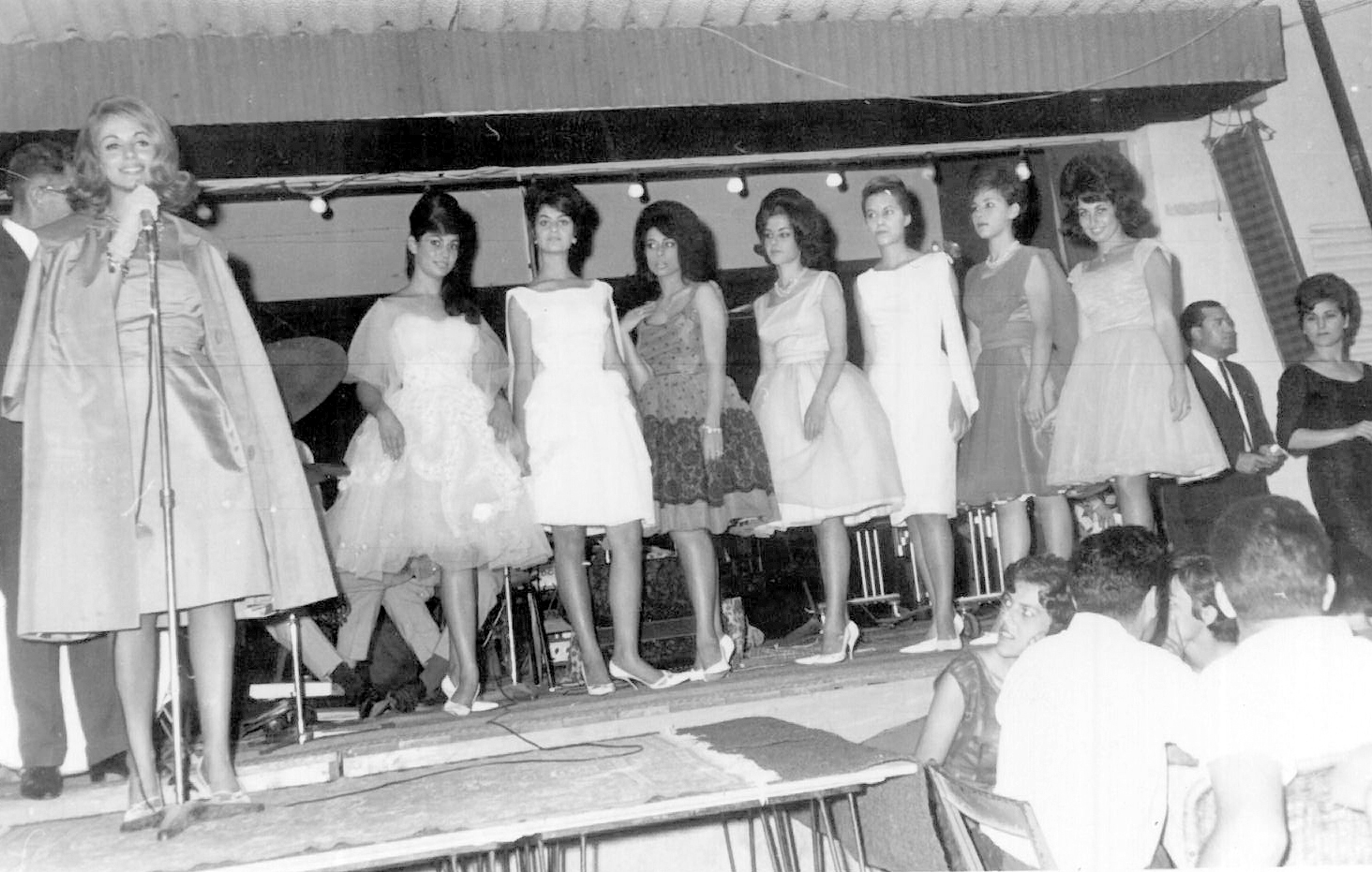
A 1960s fashion show at Penguin

Penguin (Hebrew: פינגווין, German: Pinguin) was the oldest restaurant in Nahariya and one of Israel's oldest surviving restaurants. It was located on the Ga'aton Boulevard, opposite the Ga'aton River. The cuisine was Israeli with German influences. Its signature dish was the chicken schnitzel. The restaurant was continuously family owned and operated.

== History ==
Penguin was founded as a 1940 kiosk by Ernst Oppenheimer, who arrived in 1936 from Offenbach am Main, Germany and initially tried to make a living by farming. It was named after Penguin Books. Penguin developed into a restaurant and bar that was popular with the German immigrants of Nahariya and, until 1948, with the British Mandate soldiers.

In the 2010s, the restaurant was managed by Amir Oppenheimer, a great-grandson of the founder. The restaurant closed on 26 December 2022. Its area, by now precious real-estate, will be redeveloped.
