= Mashya (restaurant) =

Restaurant in Tel Aviv Israel

Coordinates: 32.0793°N 34.7687°E

- Interactive map of Mashya

Restaurant information
- Established: 2015
- Chef: Yossi Shitrit
- Food type: Fine dining, Mediterranean cuisine
- Location: 5 Mendele Mocher Sfarim Street, Tel Aviv, Israel

Mashya (Hebrew: משייה) is an Israeli fine dining restaurant located at 5 Mendele Mocher Sfarim Street in Tel Aviv. It is led by chef Yossi Shitrit, who also designed the menus for Onza and Kitchen Market (all under the same ownership). Mashya consistently ranks between Israel's prime restaurants. The food served is not kosher.

== History ==
Mashya was founded in 2015. On 18 October 2018 smoke from the kitchen drove tens of guests out of the restaurant. Business returned to usual the next day.
