= Falafel HaZkenim =

Israeli restaurant and falafel stand

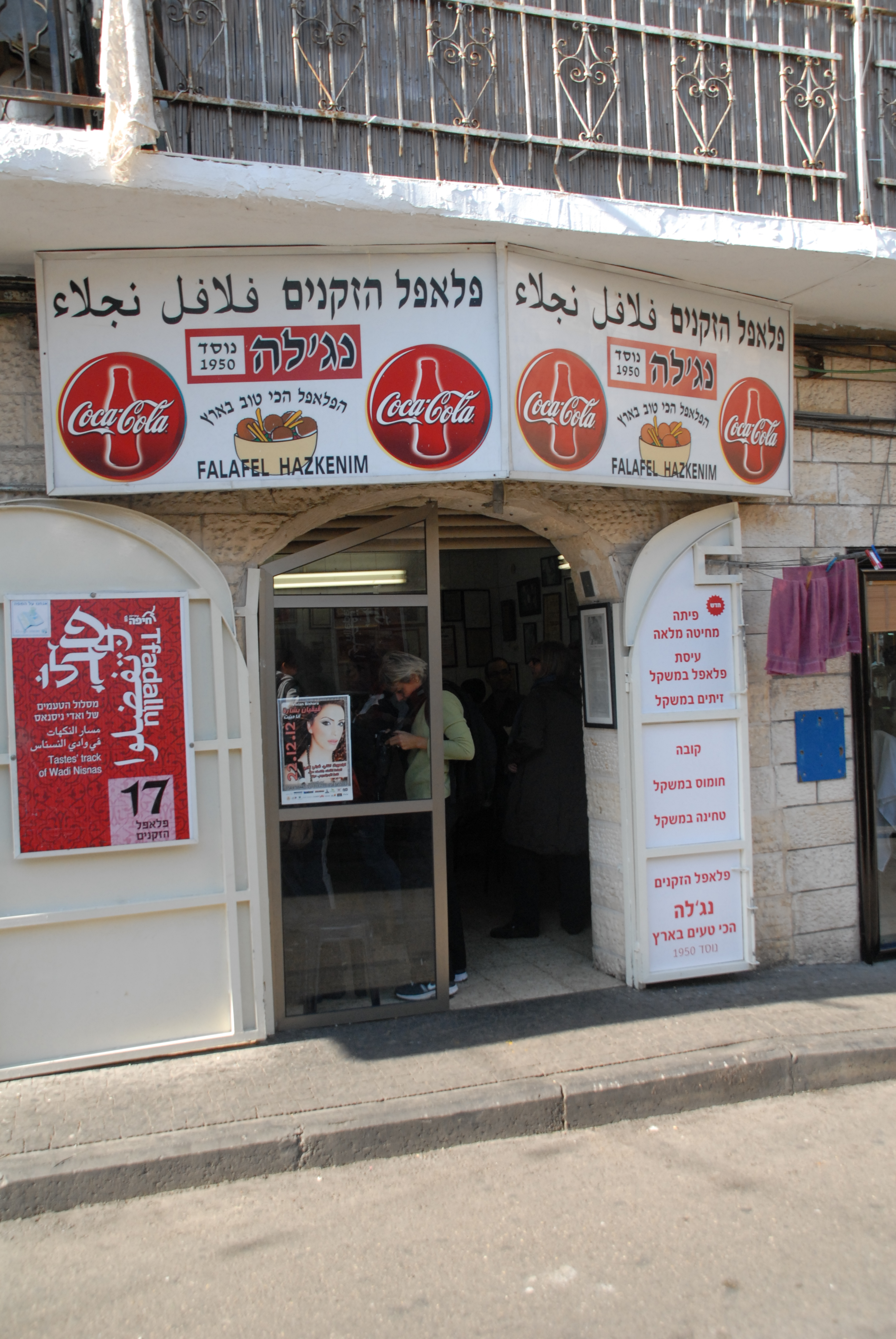
Falafel HaZkenim

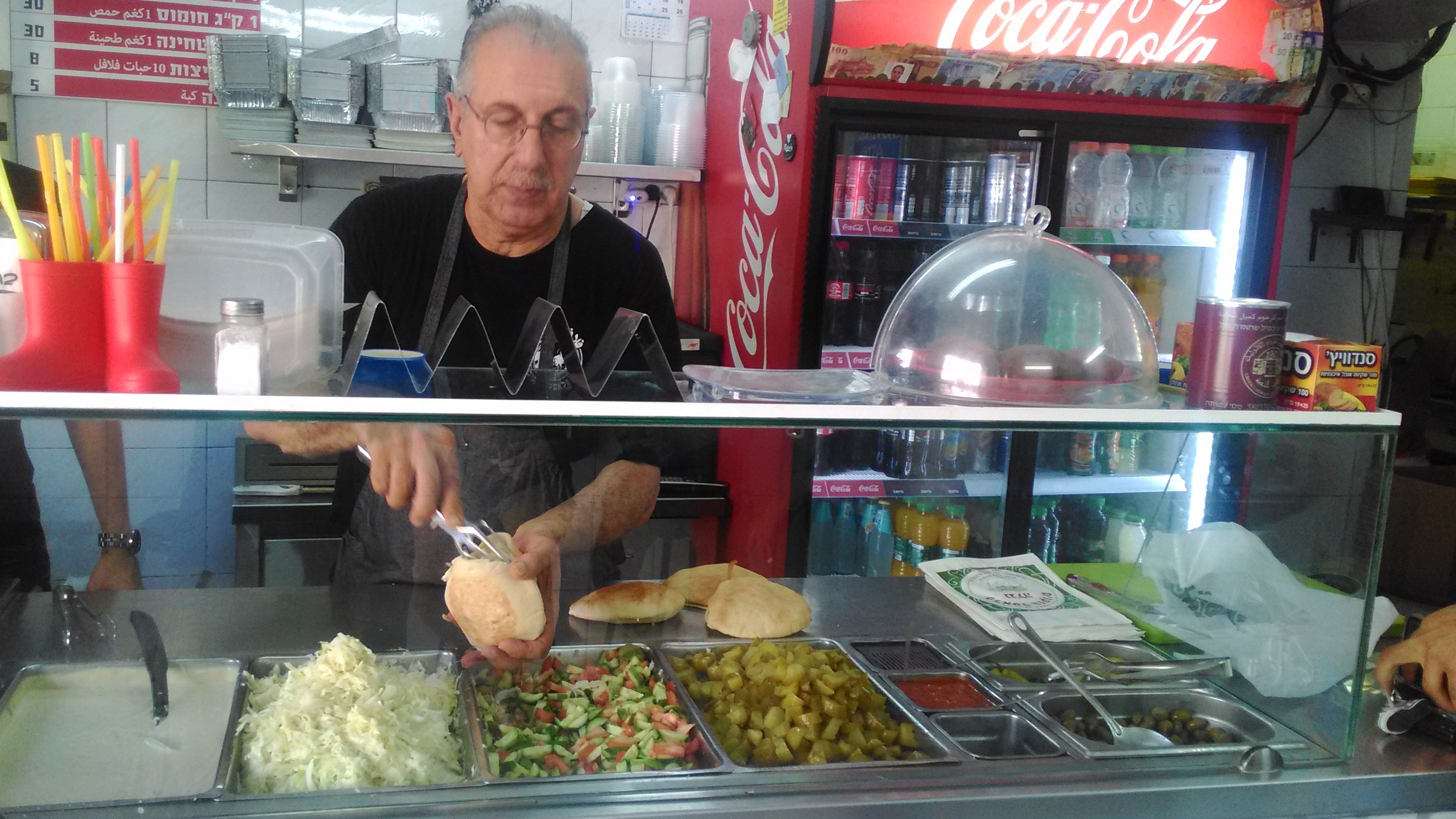
Afif Sabit at Falafel HaZkenim

Falafel HaZkenim (Hebrew: פלאפל הזקנים) or Falafel Najala (Arabic: فلافل نجلاء) is an Israeli restaurant and falafel stand, located in Wadi Nisnas, Haifa. Since foundation, guests are greeted with a free falafel ball dipped in tahini. Foodies consider HaZkenim's falafel among the best in Israel.

== History ==
It was founded in 1950 by George and Najala Afara. The falafel stand initially had no signage. Jewish customers often said that they would go to "hazkenim" (the old folks) for falafel, while Arab customers identified the place with the female co-owner. When the owners did put up a sign, it contained both names.

As the couple had no children, they sold in 1984 to Afif Sabit, who had been a loyal customer. In the early 2000s the restaurant had a branch. The former branch still exists but is no longer associated to Falafel HaZkenim.
