= Mișu King of the Kebab =

Romanian restaurant in Jaffa, Israel

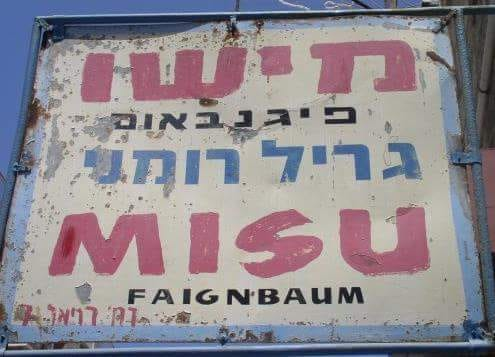
- Interactive map of Mișu King of the Kebab

Restaurant information
- Established: 1960
- Closed: 2015
- Previous owners: Sara and Mișu Feigenbaum
- Food type: Romanian restaurant
- Location: Jaffa, Israel
- Coordinates: 32.05637549°N 34.75878456°E

Mișu restaurant (Hebrew: מישו), or as it was commonly called, "Mișu the King of the Kebab", was a Romanian cuisine restaurant that operated between 1960 and 2015 (55 years) in Jaffa, Israel.

== History ==
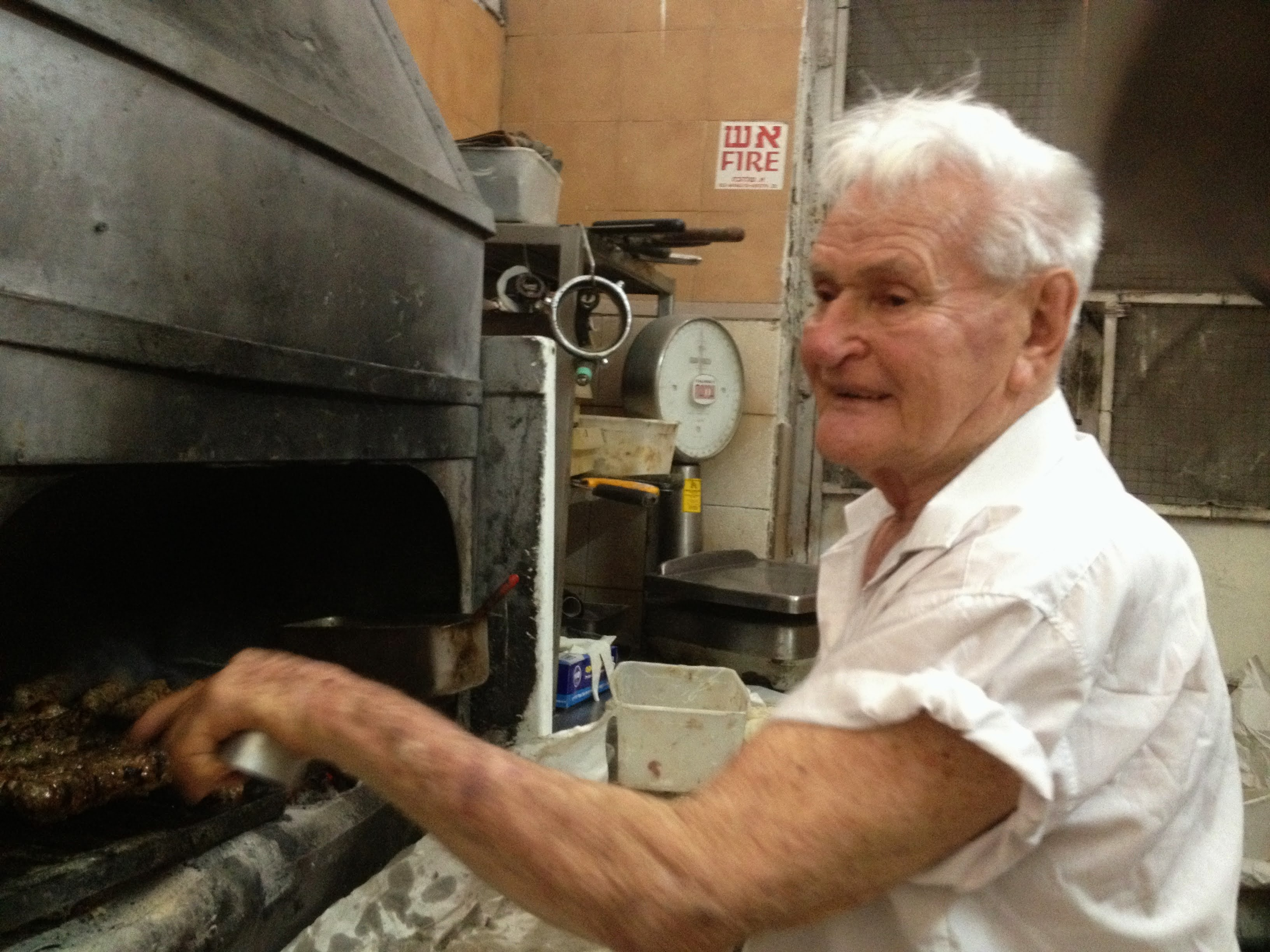
Mișu working at age 90

In 1960, the Romanian-Israeli couple Mișu and Sara Feigenbaum founded a delicatessen on HaMered Street in Jaffa, which later became a Romanian grill restaurant under the name "Mișu". The "Mișu" restaurant operated at 5 HaMered Street for about 25 years, and then moved to 7 Raziel Street in Jaffa, where it operated for another 30 years until its closure in the summer of 2015.

For most of its years of operation, the restaurant was open between 12PM to 3PM, and only 4–5 days a week. The owners of the place also worked in the restaurant themselves: Mișu prepared all the meat dishes on a charcoal grill in the kitchen, while Sara worked the tables and the cash register.

Each year the owners of the restaurant went on a summer vacation and closed the restaurant during the month of August.

== Menu ==
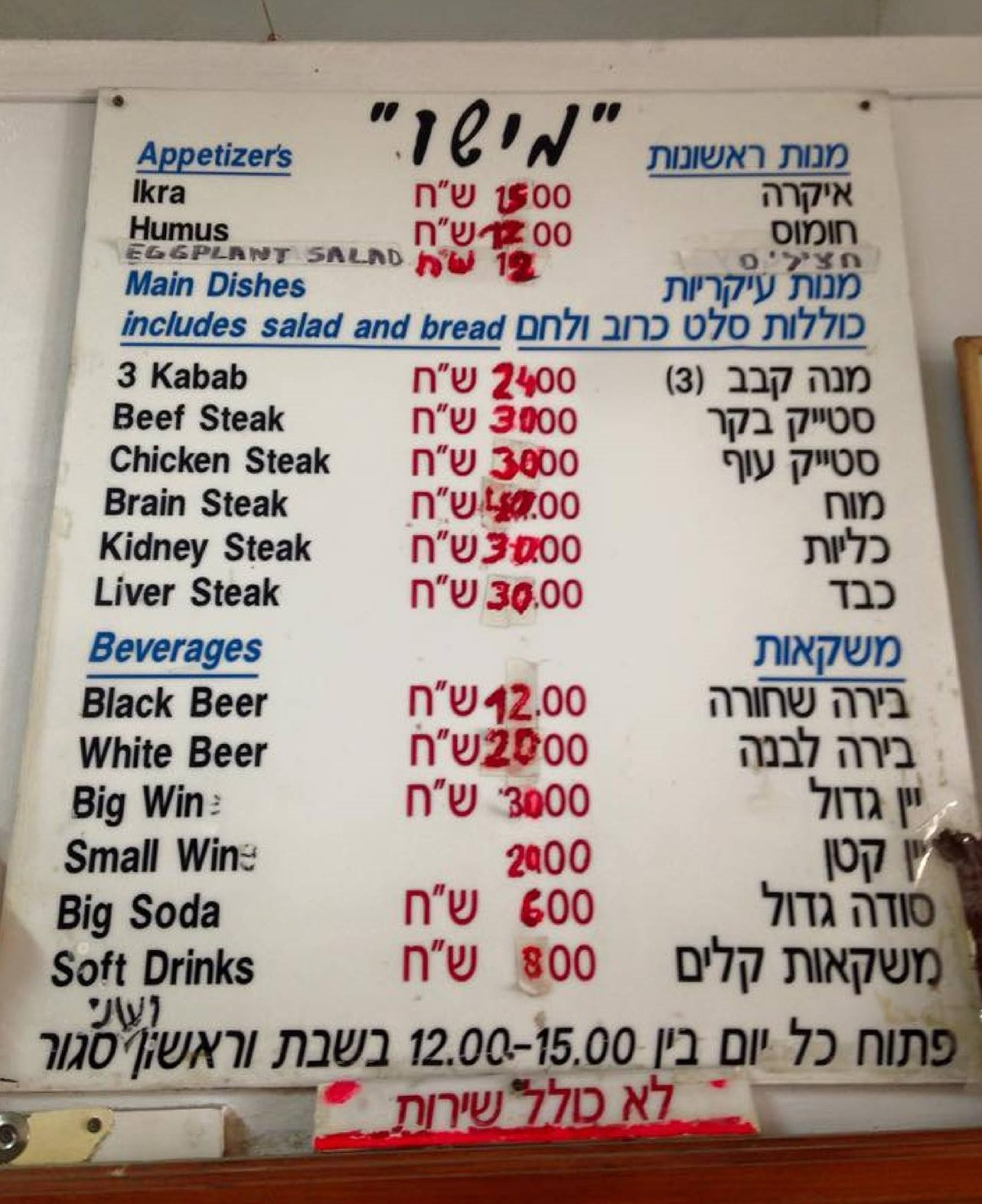
Restaurant menu

The restaurant's menu consisted mainly of meat dishes; most popular was the Mititei dish, which included three Romanian kebabs made of ground turkey and beef and seasoned with garlic.

Other main dishes included beefsteak, chicken steak (grilled chicken breast), brain in breadcrumbs served with lemon wedges, kidneys, and grilled liver. On special days, the menu also included momiță. All dishes were served alongside sauerkraut, thick slices of white bread, freshly-crushed garlic, and yellow mustard.

The restaurant also served first courses: handmade ikra with onions, hummus, eggplant salad, and chopped liver.

Drinks included Spritz: white wine served with sparkling water from a siphon bottle.

== The Founders ==
Mișu Feigenbaum was born in Bacău, in the Western Moldavia region of Romania, on March 27, 1923 and died in Tel Aviv on September 20, 2022 at the age of 99.

Mișu was a Holocaust survivor who was exiled during World War II to the Bystrica labor camp on the border of Ukraine, where he was employed in breaking rocks into small gravel stones and survived due to the fact that he completed a double amount of stones every day also for the quota of his brother Aurel. His brother, who also ran a Romanian restaurant in Jaffa on Nechama Street in the neighborhood Noga, managed to get out of the camp and get food for both of them. At the end of the war in 1945, Mișu went to Vienna, studied at the Technicum school and from there he went to Italy. In 1950 he immigrated to Israel and worked in the construction of the copper mines of Timna.

Sara "Koka" Rosenzweig was born in Buhăiești, a village that was predominantly Jewish before World War II, near Iași in Western Moldavia, on October 28, 1933. In 1945, as part of the youth immigration, Sara began her journey to the Land of Israel via Bulgaria on the Pan Crescent ship in December 1947. She was not allowed to enter Mandatory Palestine and was deported to the detention camps in Cyprus. With the establishment of the state, she immigrated to Israel and studied at the Mikva Israel Agricultural School and then at the Henrietta Sold School of Nursing in Hadassah. Upon her certification, she enlisted in the IDF and served as a nurse in the Medical Corps in Unit 542. Upon her release from the army, Sarah began working at the Kirya Maternity Hospital as a midwife.
