= Israeli breakfast =

Distinctive style of breakfast that originated in Israeli kibbutzim

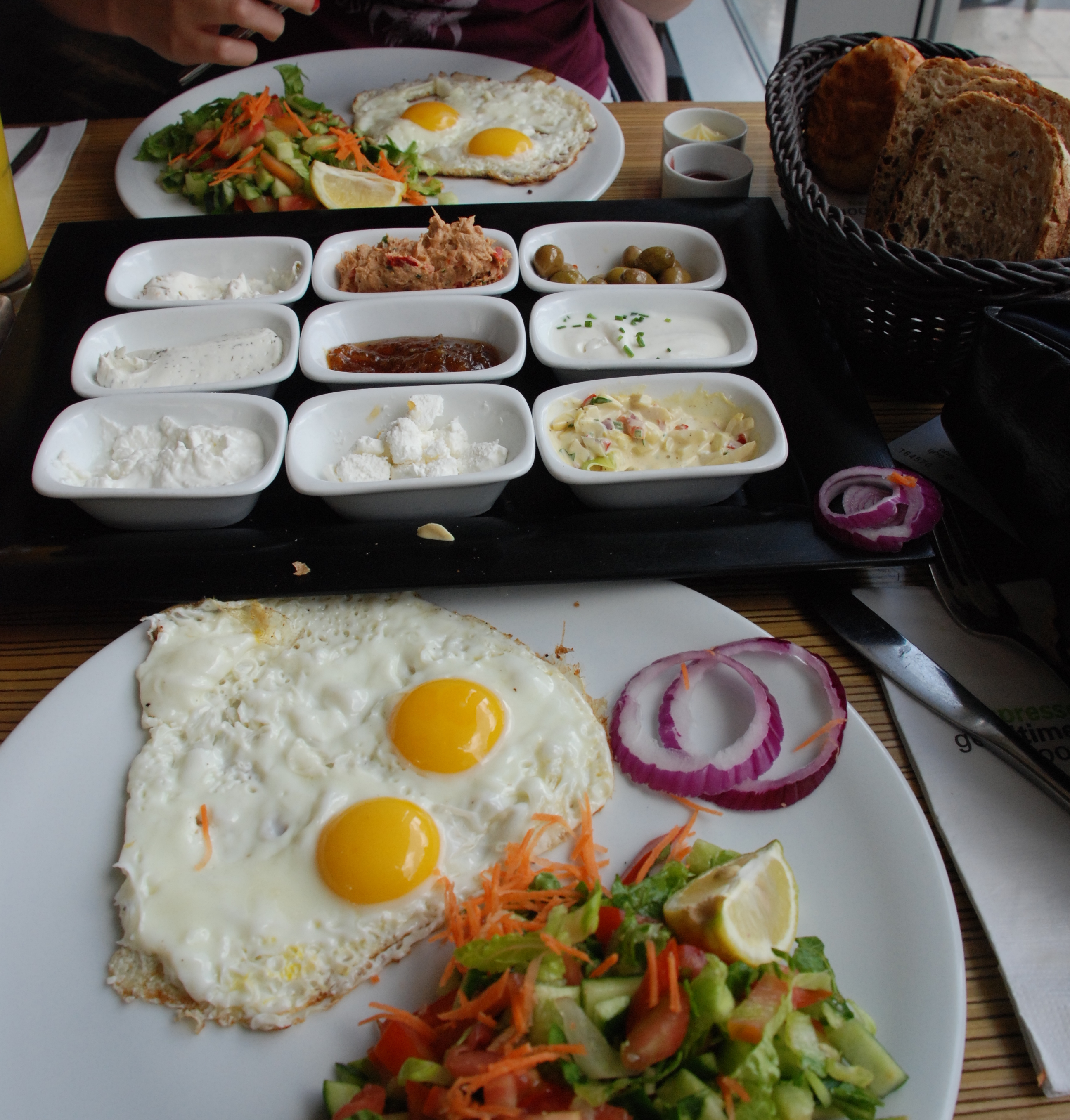
An Israeli breakfast with eggs, Israeli salad, bread and various accompaniments

An Israeli breakfast is a style of breakfast that originated on Israeli collective farms called kibbutzim, and is now served at most hotels in Israel and many restaurants. It is usually served buffet style, and consists of fruits, vegetables, salads, breads, pastries, dairy foods, eggs and fish. Meat is almost never included.

== History ==
During the early days of the state of Israel, residents of a kibbutz ate their meals in a communal dining hall. It was common for the residents to eat a light snack early in the morning, and then work in the fields for several hours. Then they returned to the dining hall for a hearty mid morning buffet meal, similar to a brunch. By the 1950s, Israeli hotels were promoting the "Israeli breakfast" in a style similar to the kibbutz meals.

In 1979, members of the Jerusalem Hotel Association and the Israeli Hotel Owners Association decided to phase out the full Israeli breakfast as a part of their basic hotel room rate, substituting it with a more modest Continental breakfast instead, in order to reduce costs. The Israeli breakfast of the time, as per the Sarasota Herald Tribune, had been described as follows:

The breakfast buffet traditionally includes juice, fresh fruit, stewed fruit, pickled and smoked herring, perhaps some smoked salmon, olives, cucumbers, green peppers, yogurt, cottage cheese, sliced yellow cheeses, tomatoes, boiled eggs, jams, butter, bread, rolls, croissants, and, of course, coffee or tea.

Reasons cited for the discontinuation of the Israeli breakfast included rising costs and the need to combat the tourist impulse to hoard breakfast items for later meals. The discontinuation effort was not successful, and the tradition of serving a hearty breakfast buffet resumed.

== Characteristics and typical dishes ==
At hotels in Israel, the Israeli breakfast is commonly presented as a self-service buffet. In smaller restaurants, a more streamlined menu may be presented through sit down table service.

The Israeli breakfast never includes meats such as ham and bacon, which are common on breakfast menus in many other countries. In accordance with the Jewish laws of Kashrut, meat and dairy ingredients are never served together in a meal and pork products are forbidden. The Israeli breakfast is a dairy meal, and a variety of cheeses are offered. Fish is pareve and so is permitted with a dairy meal, and herring is frequently served. Other smoked or pickled fish dishes are also common, including sprats, sardines and salmon.

Egg dishes are almost universal, which may be pre-cooked or cooked to order. The Maghrebi egg dish shakshouka (shakshuka), brought to Israel by Tunisian Jews, is a common choice, comprising eggs poached in tomato sauce.

Other Middle Eastern dishes may include Israeli salad, hummus, tehina, halloumi, ful medames, baba ghanoush and the strained yogurt known as labaneh. Fresh vegetables such as tomatoes, cucumbers, green peppers, radishes, onions and shredded carrots are common, as are olives. A variety of salads are available. Coffee, tea, juices, fresh fruits, bread and pastries complete the menu.

== Gallery ==
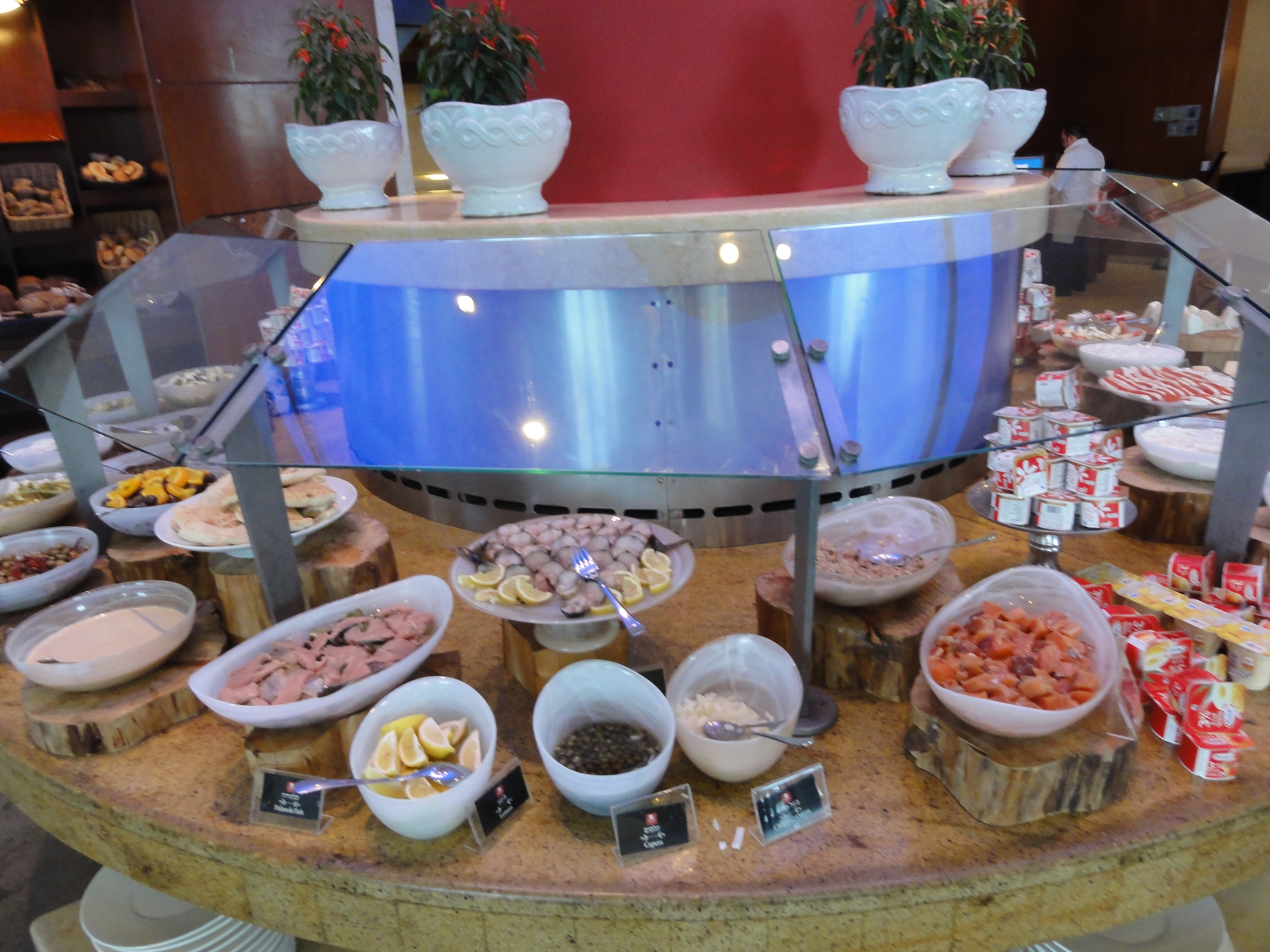
A breakfast buffet at a hotel in Haifa, Israel

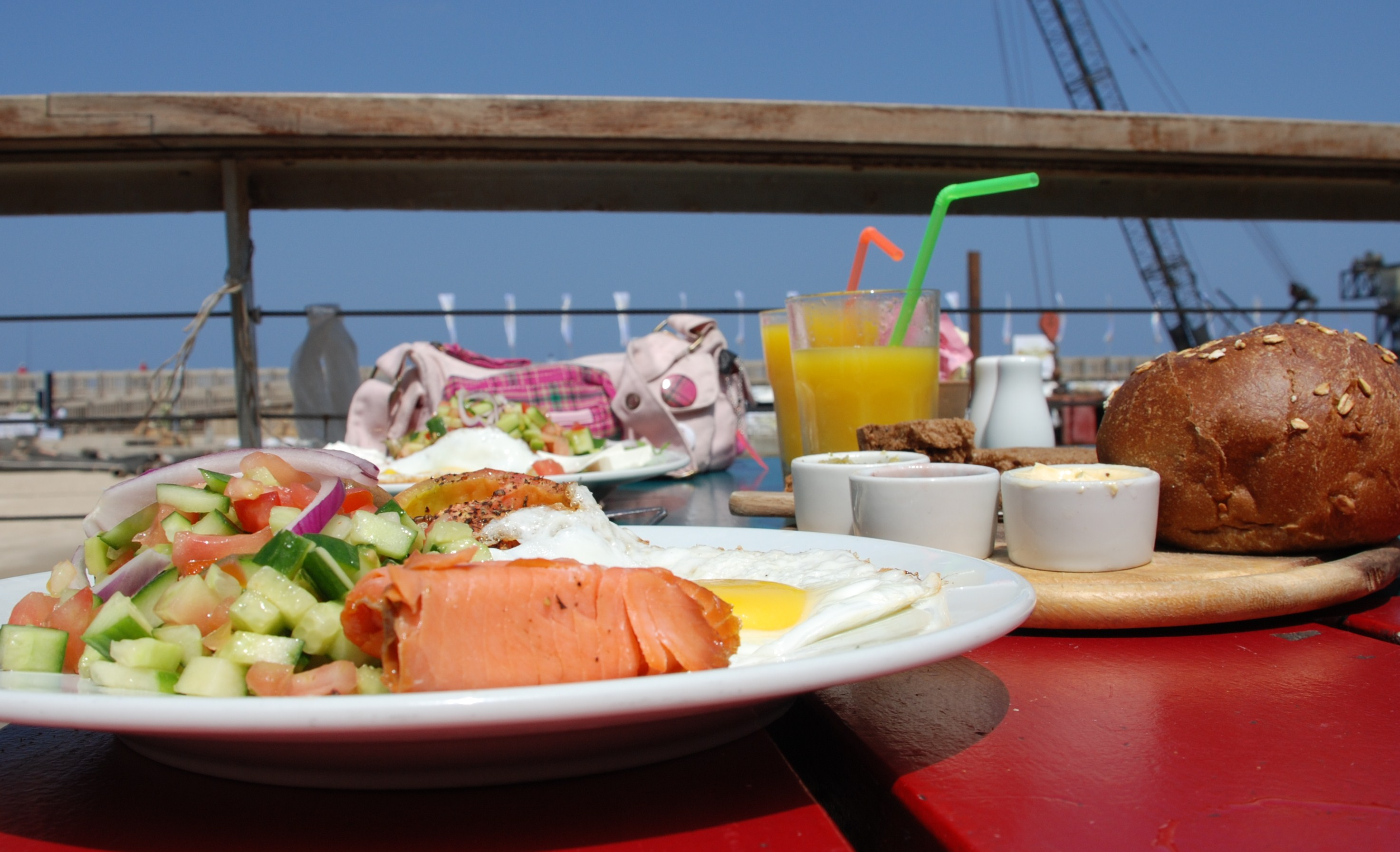
An Israeli breakfast

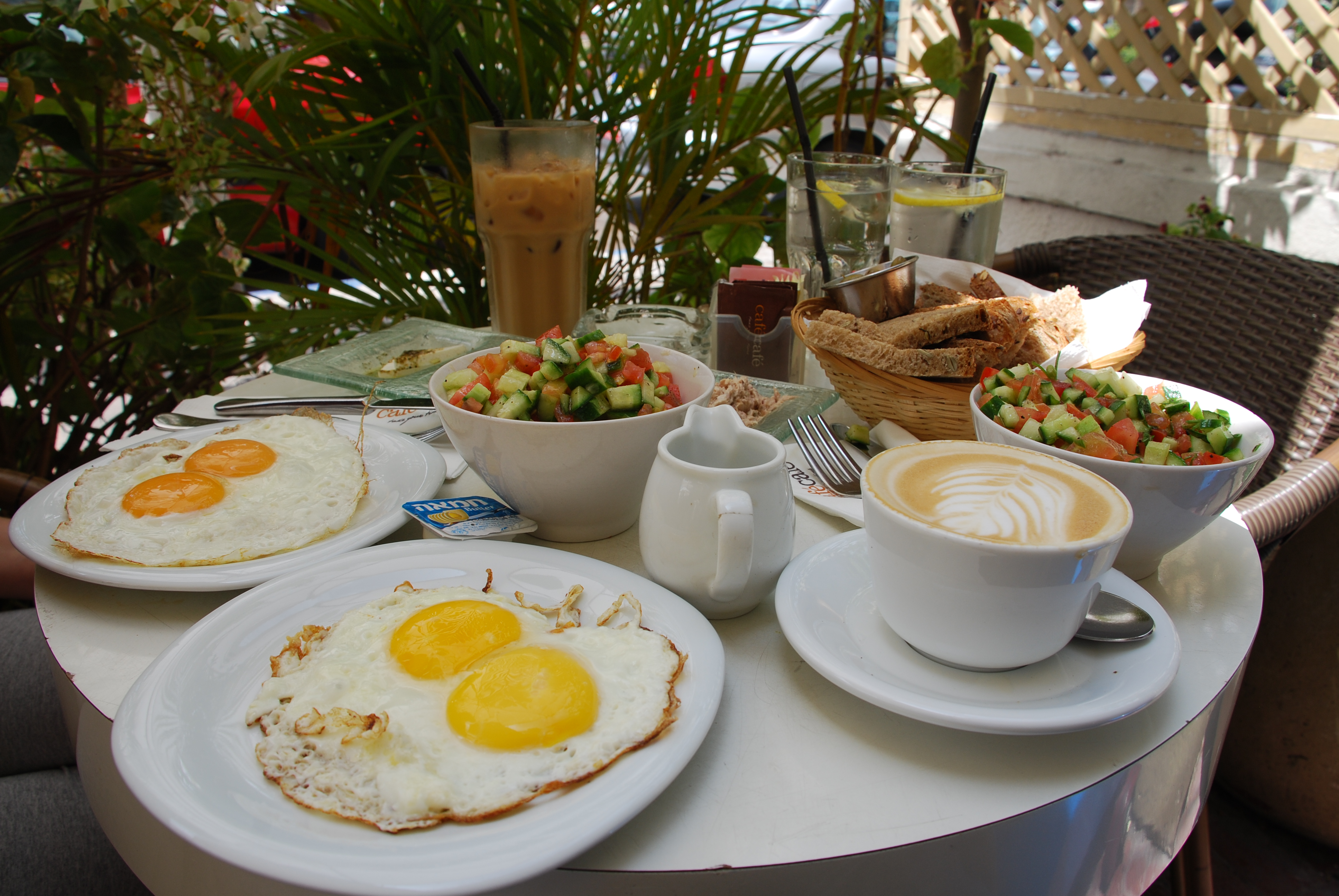
An Israeli breakfast with eggs, Israeli salad, bread and various accompaniments

== See also ==
- Israeli cuisine
- Culture of Israel
- Full breakfast
