= Barood (restaurant) =

Israeli restaurant in Jerusalem

Coordinates: 31.7808°N 35.2208°E

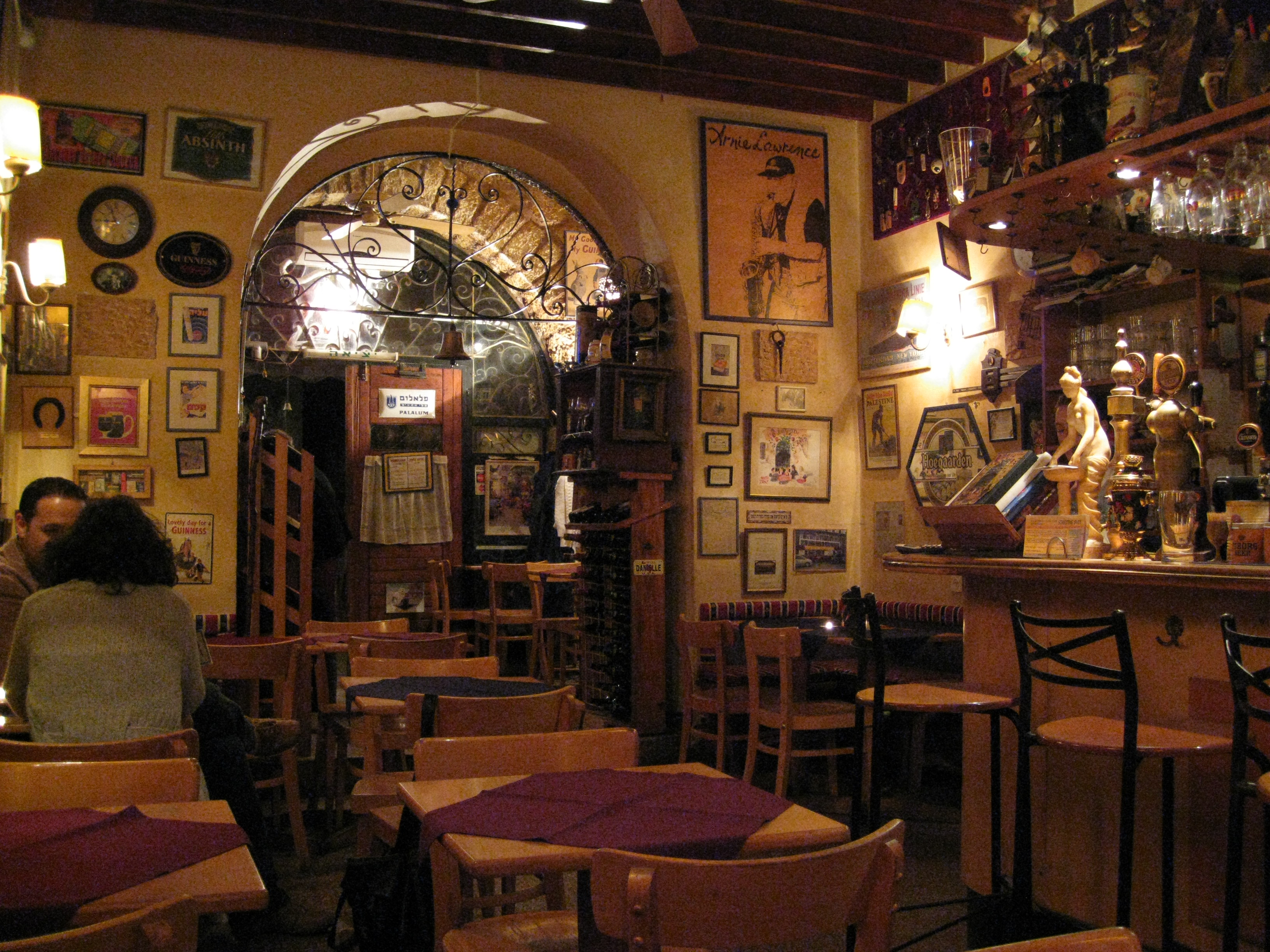
Barood, Jerusalem

Barood (Barud) is an Israeli bar-restaurant off Jaffa Road in Jerusalem, serving Sephardic cuisine. It was founded in 1995. The last restaurant in its area open on Shabbat, the restaurant is a frequent scene of demonstrations by Haredi Jews. The restaurant features live music.

== Gallery ==
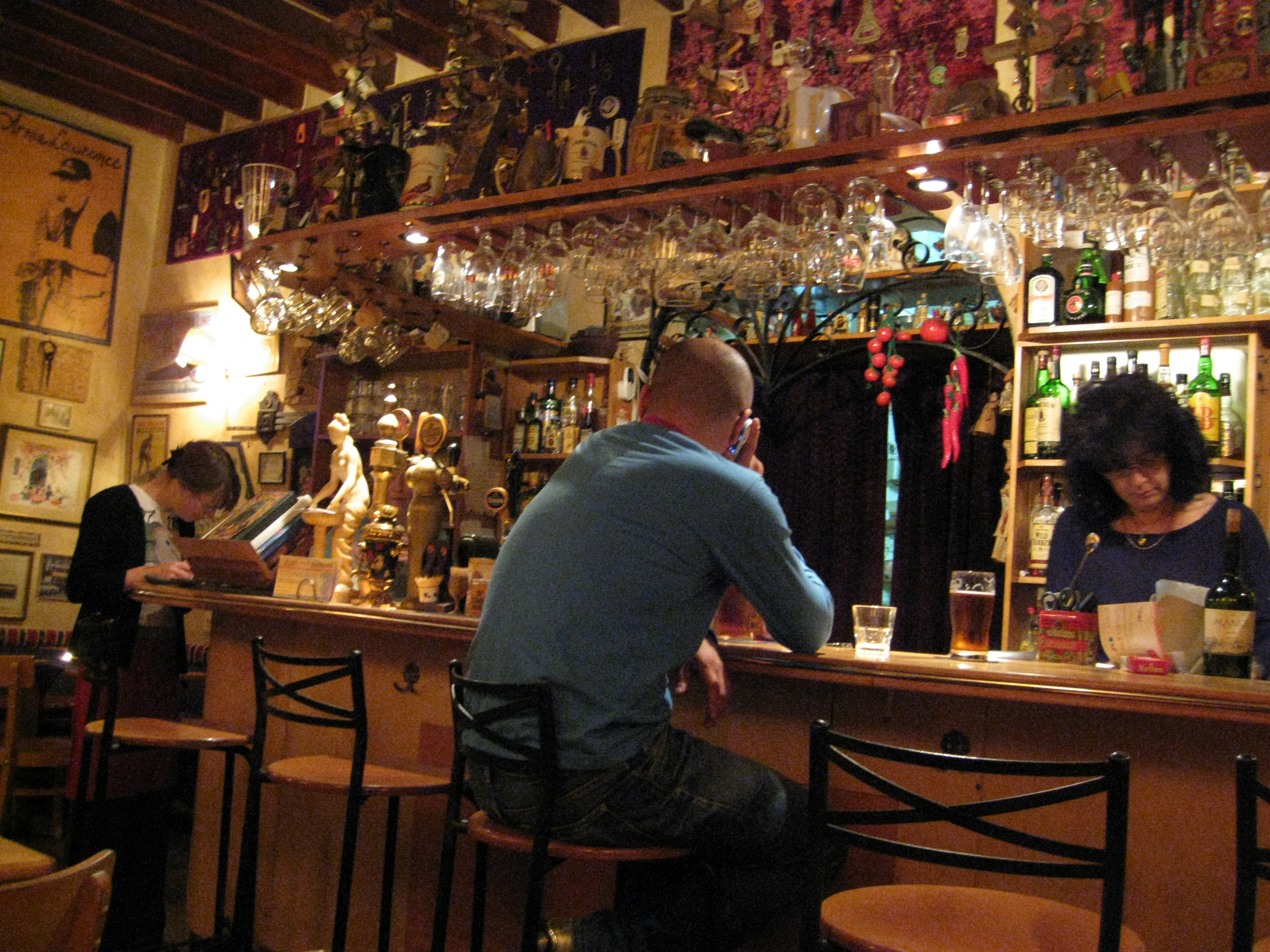
