= David Warner (cricketer) =

Australian international cricketer (born 1986)

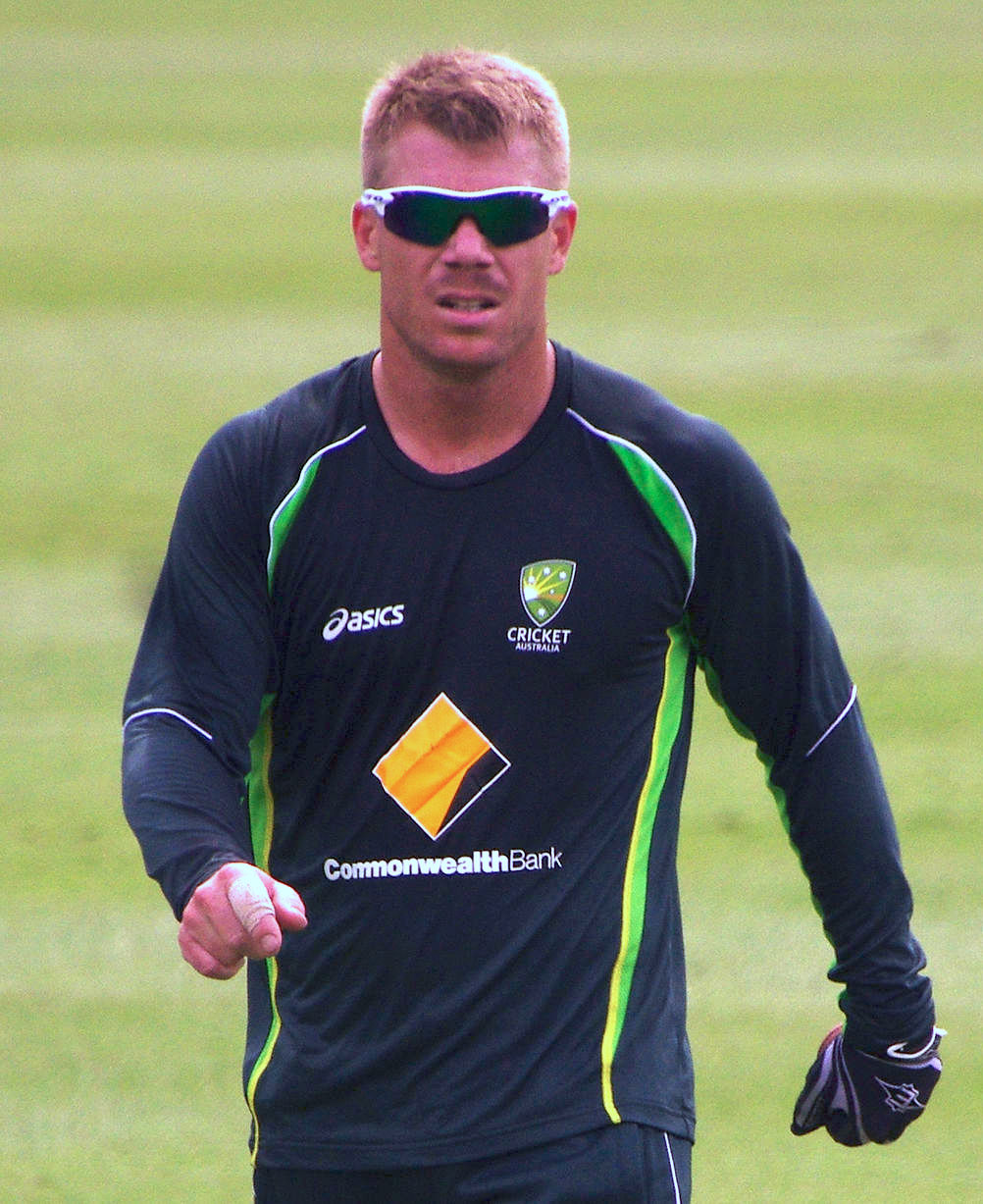
- Warner in 2014

Personal information
- Full name: David Andrew Warner
- Born: 27 October 1986 (age 40); Paddington, New South Wales, Australia
- Nickname: Lloyd, Bull
- Batting: Left-handed
- Bowling: Right arm leg break
- Role: Opening batter

International information
- National side: Australia (2009–2024)
- Test debut (cap 426): 1 December 2011 v New Zealand
- Last Test: 3 January 2024 v Pakistan
- ODI debut (cap 170): 18 January 2009 v South Africa
- Last ODI: 19 November 2023 v India
- ODI shirt no.: 31
- T20I debut (cap 32): 11 January 2009 v South Africa
- Last T20I: 24 June 2024 v India
- T20I shirt no.: 31

Domestic team information
- Years: Team
- 2006/07–2020/21: New South WaIes
- 2009–2013, 2022–2024: Delhi Capitals
- 2009: Durham
- 2010: Middlesex
- 2010/11: Northern Districts
- 2011/12, 2013/14, 2022/23–present: Sydney Thunder
- 2012/13: Sydney Sixers
- 2014–2021: Sunrisers Hyderabad
- 2018: St Lucia Stars
- 2018: Winnipeg Hawks
- 2019: Sylhet Sixers
- 2024–present: Dubai Capitals
- 2025–present: Karachi Kings
- 2025: Seattle Orcas
- 2025: London Spirit
- 2026: Kathmandu Gorkhas

Career statistics
Competition	Test	ODI	T20I	FC
Matches	112	161	110	143
Runs scored	8,786	6,932	3,277	11,265
Batting average	44.59	45.30	33.43	45.60
100s/50s	26/37	22/33	1/28	34/46
Top score	335*	179	100*	335*
Balls bowled	342	6	–	595
Wickets	4	0	–	6
Bowling average	67.25	–	–	75.83
5 wickets in innings	0	–	–	0
10 wickets in match	0	–	–	0
Best bowling	2/45	–	–	2/45
Catches/stumpings	91/–	71/–	62/–	108/–
Medal record
Men's Cricket
Representing Australia
ICC Cricket World Cup
Winner	2015 Australia and New Zealand
Winner	2023 India
ICC T20 World Cup
Winner	2021 UAE and Oman
ICC World Test Championship
Winner	2021–2023
- Source: ESPNcricinfo, 24 June 2024

David Andrew Warner (born 27 October 1986) is an Australian former international cricketer, captain of Big Bash League team Sydney Thunder and captain of Pakistan Super League team Karachi Kings. A left-handed opening batter, Warner was the first Australian cricketer in 132 years to be selected for the national team in any format without experience in first-class cricket. He captained Australia in ODIs and T20Is and served as a vice-captain across formats before his suspension and played his domestic cricket for New South Wales Cricket Team. Warner was a prominent member of the victorious Australian squad of the 2015 Cricket World Cup, the 2021 T20 World Cup, where he was the Player of the Tournament, the 2021–2023 ICC World Test Championship, and the 2023 ICC Cricket World Cup. Warner also guided Indian Premier League team Sunrisers Hyderabad to their first and only IPL title, becoming the third Australian captain after Adam Gilchrist and Shane Warne to do so. Warner holds the record of the most international centuries as an opening batsman across all international formats. He also holds the record for most 50+ scores in T20 cricket.

In January 2017, he became the fourth player to win the Allan Border Medal more than once and to win the award in consecutive years. On 28 September 2017, he played in his 100th One Day International (ODI).

In March 2018, following a preliminary investigation into ball tampering by the Australian team in the third match of their Test series against South Africa, Warner was suspended and charged with bringing the game into disrepute. Following a board meeting later in the month, Cricket Australia banned Warner from all international and domestic cricket in Australia for one year, and from any leadership positions permanently. The ban on leadership positions was lifted on 18 October 2024.

In January 2024, Warner played his final Test match for Australia and also announced his retirement from ODI cricket. On 25 June 2024, Warner announced his retirement from international cricket after Australia's exit from the 2024 ICC Men's T20 World Cup.

== Early life ==
David Warner was born on 27 October 1986 in Paddington, a suburb in eastern Sydney. At the age of 13, he was asked by his coach to switch to right-handed batting because he kept hitting the ball in the air. However his mother, Lorraine Warner (née Orange), encouraged him to return to batting left-handed and he broke the under-16's run-scoring record for the Sydney Coastal Cricket Club. He then made his first grade debut for the Eastern Suburbs club at the age of 15 and later toured Sri Lanka with the Australian under-19s and earned a rookie contract with the state team. Warner grew up in a housing commission estate in Matraville in Sydney's south-east and attended Matraville Public School and Randwick Boys High School.

== Domestic career ==
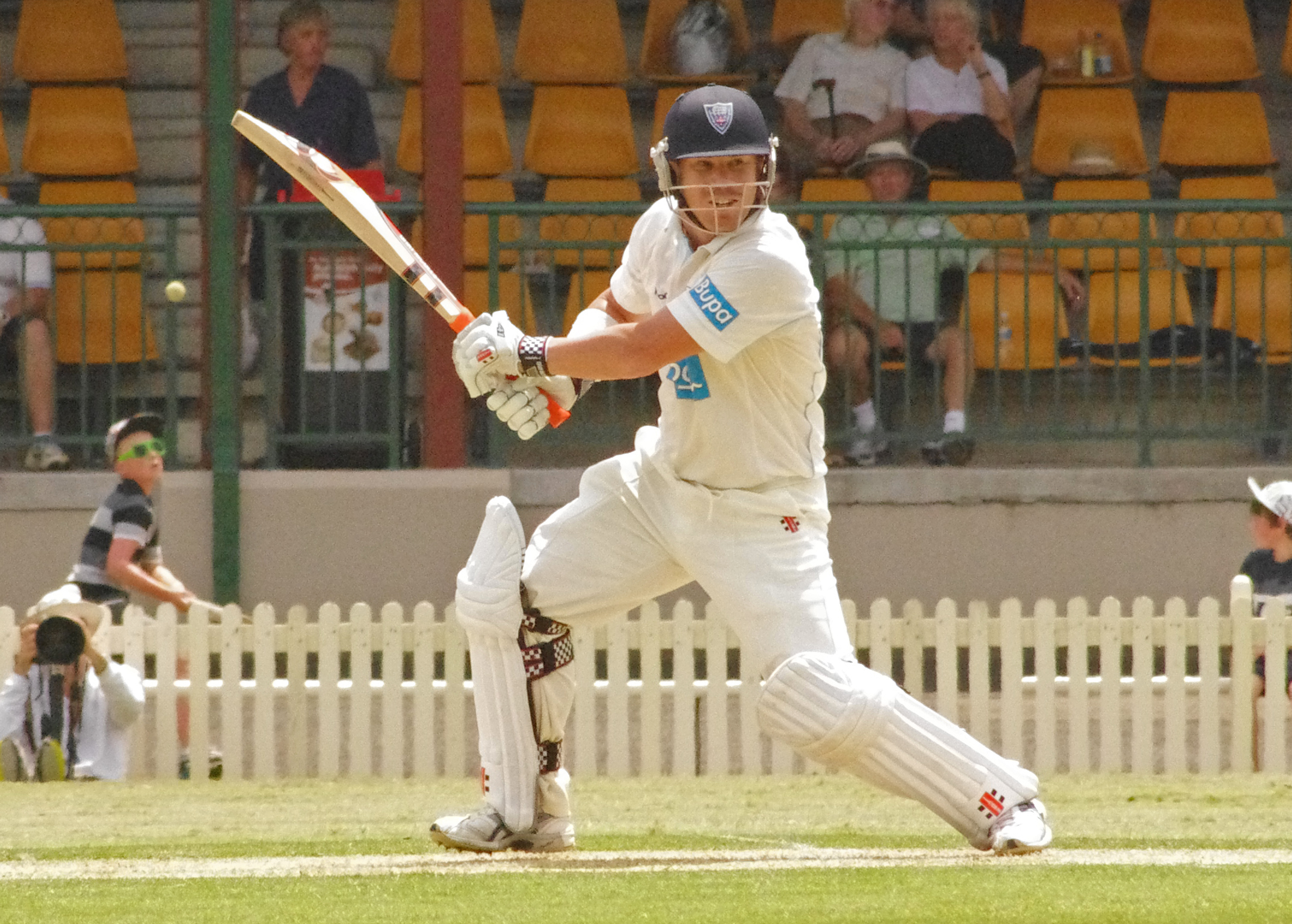
Warner playing for New South Wales in 2011.

On 29 November 2008, Warner hit his first domestic One Day century for New South Wales with a score of 165* against Tasmania at Hurstville Oval in Sydney. This innings got him the record of the highest one day score by a Blues player. In the reverse fixture at Hobart, he backed it up with a 54-ball 97 to narrowly miss the record for the fastest ever century in Australian domestic cricket.

Warner made his first-class debut playing for New South Wales against Western Australia in the final match of the 2008–09 Sheffield Shield season at the Sydney Cricket Ground on 5–8 March 2009. Batting only once and coming in at number six in the batting order, Warner scored 42 runs off 48 deliveries.

While playing for New South Wales, Warner broke the record for the highest Australian one-day domestic score. His score of 197 came off just 141 balls and included 20 fours and 10 sixes, surpassing Jimmy Maher's previous record of 187.

=== Big Bash League ===
In 2009, Warner set a new record for the fastest half-century scored in the Australian domestic Twenty20 cricket, completing his 50 in 18 balls against Tasmania. In the first season of the newly revamped Big Bash League, Warner was named as captain for the Sydney Thunder and scored 102 not out from 51 balls in his first match for the team. Warner played for Sydney Sixers in 2012–13 season.

Warner returned to the BBL in 2022 with the Sydney Thunder. He was named captain of the Thunder in November 2024. He was named in the Team of the Tournament for BBL14 after scoring 346 runs.

=== Indian Premier League ===
Warner has been one of the most successful overseas batsmen in the Indian Premier League, scoring over 6,000 runs and winning the Orange Cap award for the highest scoring batter in a season three times.

Warner was signed by Delhi Daredevils in 2009, playing for the team until 2013. Following the 2014 IPL auction, however, he moved to Sunrisers Hyderabad for US$880,000. In 2015, he was appointed captain of the team and ended the season as the tournament's leading run scorer.

He continued as captain in 2016, leading the team to its first championship, scoring 69 runs from 38 balls in the final against Royal Challengers Bangalore. Warner finished the season with 848 runs, the second highest in the tournament. In 2017, Warner scored 126 runs against Kolkata Knight Riders, breaking his previous career highest IPL score of 109 not out. He finished the season as the leading run scorer, and was awarded the Orange cap for the second time.

After having been named as captain again for the 2018 season, Warner stepped down from the role following the ball tampering affair in South Africa, and the Board of Control for Cricket in India banned him from playing during the season. He returned to the team in 2019, scoring 85 runs in his first match before scoring an unbeaten century against Royal Challengers Bangalore two days later. He finished the season as the leading run scorer with 692 runs despite leaving the team after due to Australia's World Cup preparations.

In February 2020, Warner was reinstated as captain, replacing Kane Williamson. In October, he became the first overseas player and fourth overall to score over 5,000 runs in the IPL, achieving the milestone in 135 innings, the fastest to do so. In 2021 Warner was replaced as captain by Williamson after six matches, with the team winning only one match. In the second stage of the tournament, he was dropped from the team after two matches. The team's assistant coach Brad Haddin later revealed that the decision to drop him was not a cricket decision.

Hyderabad chose not to retain Warner ahead of the 2022 IPL auction, and he was bought by Delhi Capitals for ₹6.25 crore (equivalent to ₹7.2 crore or US$770,000 in 2026). He finished the season as Delhi's top run-scorer with 432 runs. In 2023, he captained Delhi following an injury to Rishabh Pant. He once again finished as the highest run scorer for the team with 516 runs. In the following 2024 season, which marked effectively his last in the IPL, Warner had a disappointing campaign, scoring only 168 runs across 8 matches with a single half-century, and was benched several times. After this season, he was released by the Delhi Capitals and went unsold in the 2025 IPL auction. He chose not to register for the 2026 IPL auction.

=== Other T20 cricket ===
Warner has played In England for Durham and Middlesex County Cricket Clubs. In 2018 he captained Winnipeg Hawks in the first season of the Global T20 Canada tournament and in 2019 played in the Bangladesh Premier League for Sylhet Sixers. In November 2023, David Warner was rumored to join Lahore Qalandars with his inclusion in the 2024 Pakistan Super League draft. In the 2025 Pakistan Super League, David Warner joined Karachi Kings as their captain and led them to the playoffs where Lahore Qalandars beat them.

On 11 February 2026, the first-ever Pakistan Super League auction was held where Warner was one of the biggest names in pool. He was signed by Karachi Kings for a mega price of PKR 7.90 crore.

== International career ==
=== Debut years ===
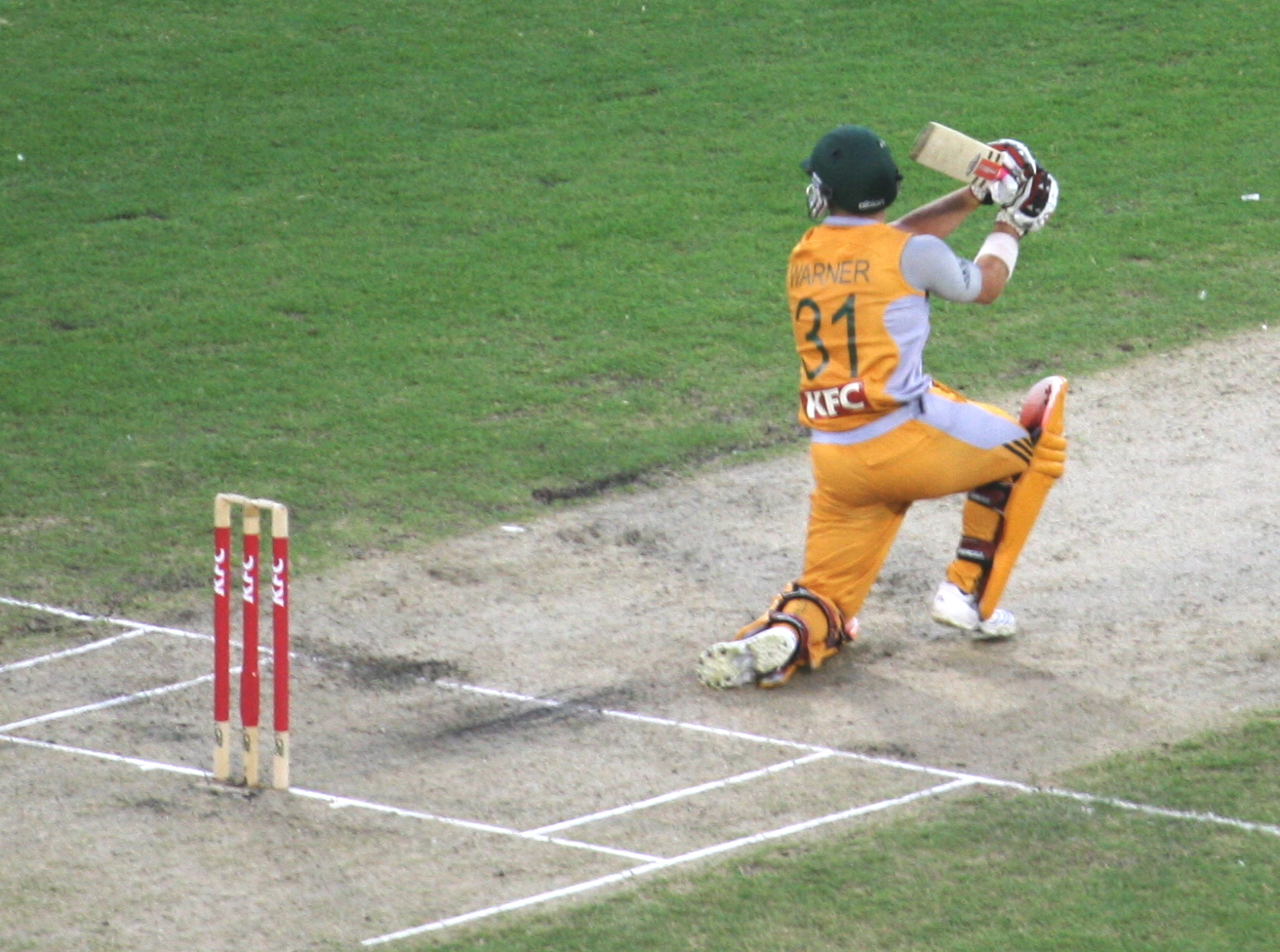
Warner on his T20 International debut against South Africa in 2009

Warner made his international debut for Australia in a Twenty20 International against South Africa at the Melbourne Cricket Ground on 11 January 2009. Warner was the first man since 1877 to represent Australia without having played in a first-class match. He made an immediate impact, scoring 89 off 43 balls with 7 fours and 6 sixes, including the then second-fastest fifty in Twenty20 International history. His 89 was the second highest score on Twenty20 international debut.

He made his Test debut on 1 December 2011 against New Zealand at Brisbane, Queensland in the first Test of the Trans-Tasman Trophy due to an injury to Shane Watson. He made three runs in the first innings. In the second innings he scored 12 not out off four balls, scoring the winning runs with a pull shot through mid on.

On 23 February 2010, playing a Twenty20 international against the West Indies at the Sydney Cricket Ground, he made 67 off just 29 balls. His 50 came in just 18 balls, breaking his old record of 19.

=== Start of good form ===
Warner scored his maiden Test century on 12 December 2011 in Australia's unsuccessful run chase against New Zealand in Hobart. Warner made 123* in his team's second innings total of 233. In doing so he became just the sixth person to carry his bat through the fourth innings of a Test match. Warner bowls right arm leg-break and on his first delivery in Test cricket, the ball was dropped in the outfield denying Warner a maiden Test wicket.

On 13 January 2012, in only his fifth Test match, Warner scored a 69-ball century against India at the WACA. At the time, this equalled West Indian Shivnarine Chanderpaul for the fourth fastest Test century of all time, in terms of balls faced. He ultimately built his innings to a score of 180 from 159 balls, setting a new personal high score in Test cricket.

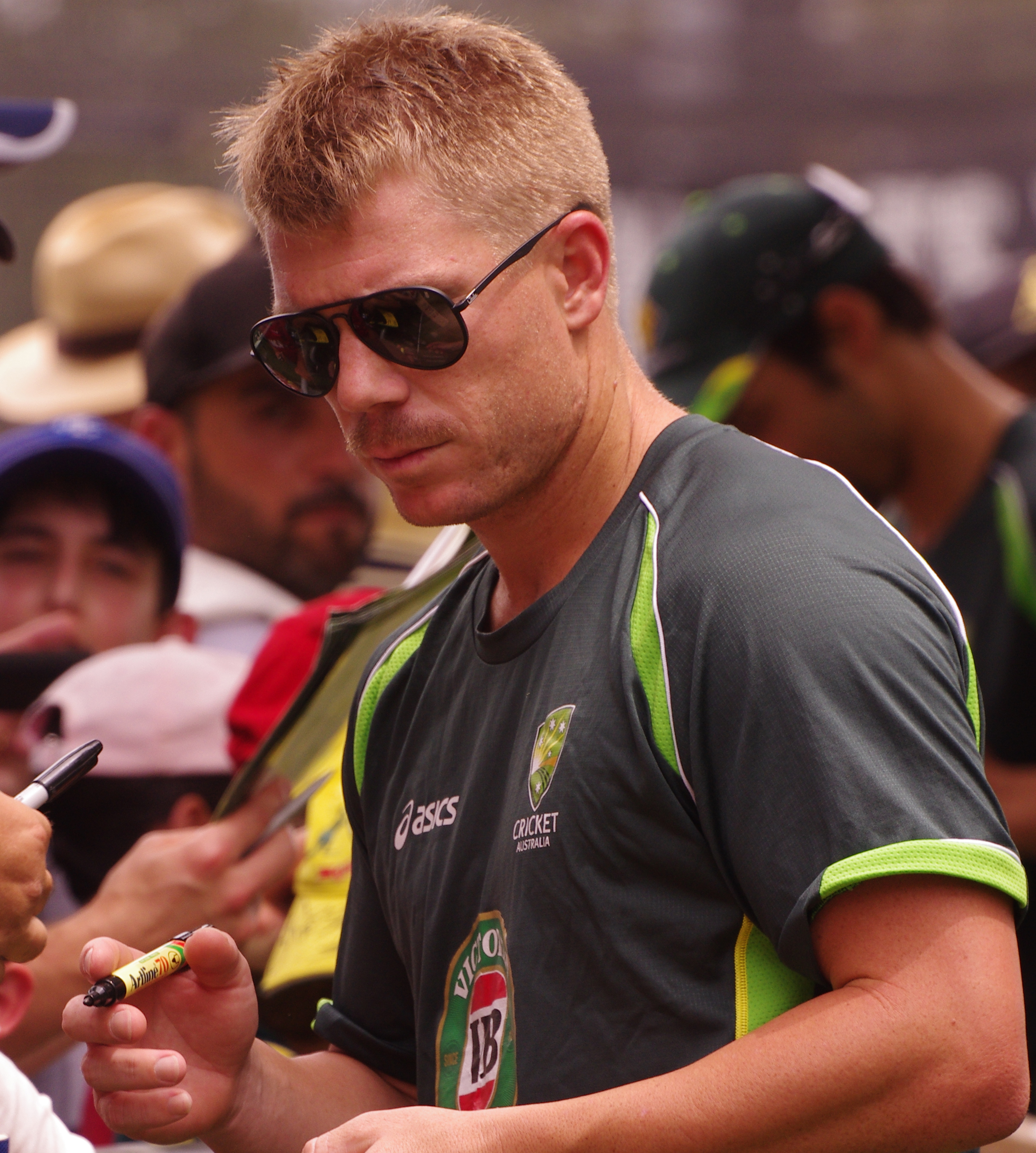
Warner in 2014

Warner scored 163 off 157 balls at the Gabba on 4 March 2012 in the first final of the CB Series against Sri Lanka. He batted until the last ball of the innings. It was his first ODI hundred for Australia. He followed it up with 100 and 48 in the other two finals at the Adelaide Oval. Warner's aggregate of 311 runs was the highest ever for the finals of an Australian Tri-Series, surpassing Greg Chappell's 266 runs in 1981.

During the 2015 Cricket World Cup, Warner started the World Cup decently by scoring 22 against England and 34 against New Zealand. But in their fourth match against Afghanistan, he scored 178 runs off 133 balls, which became his highest score in ODIs, helped Australia to score the highest team total in any World Cup and the highest in Australia. Warner ended up as the tournament's 11th highest scorer, scoring 345 runs at an average of 49.28.

Warner was one of Australia's better players during the 2015 Ashes in which Australia lost 3–2. Despite not registering a century, Warner scored 418 runs during the series, the fourth highest run-scorer behind Steve Smith, Chris Rogers and Joe Root. During the one-day series in England, bowler Steve Finn hit Warner's thumb, breaking it. This meant Warner took no part in the rest of the series and the scheduled series to Bangladesh which did not take place due to security issues.

In 2016, Warner had a reversal of form, scoring more runs in ODIs than Tests. Nevertheless, he still scored his 5,000th Test run and 3,000th home Test run against Pakistan on 28 December 2016.

=== Records and achievements ===
Warner was the first Australian cricketer in 132 years to be selected for a national team in any format without experience in first-class cricket. He is the first Australian batsman to score 7 ODI centuries in a calendar year.

Warner and Shane Watson have been the most successful opening pair in T20I history with 1108 runs (highest overall partnership runs by openers in T20Is). They are also the only opening pairs to have scored over 1000 runs in T20Is. Both Warner and Watson as pairs scored 1154 runs in T20I history, the most by any pair in T20I history. Warner is the first Australian and sixth overall to reach 1,500 T20I runs.

Warner also became the first batsman to ever score three centuries at the WACA, with his top 2 scores in Tests both achieved in the same stadium. His top score of 253 was also the second-highest individual score to be surpassed by an opposition batsman in the same Test match, which was surpassed during Ross Taylor's knock of 290.

On 7 November 2015, Warner became only the third batsman in history of Test cricket to score centuries in both innings of a Test match thrice, after Sunil Gavaskar and Ricky Ponting. In the very next Test match against New Zealand, he scored his maiden Test double century at the WACA, Perth, his fourth consecutive century against New Zealand.

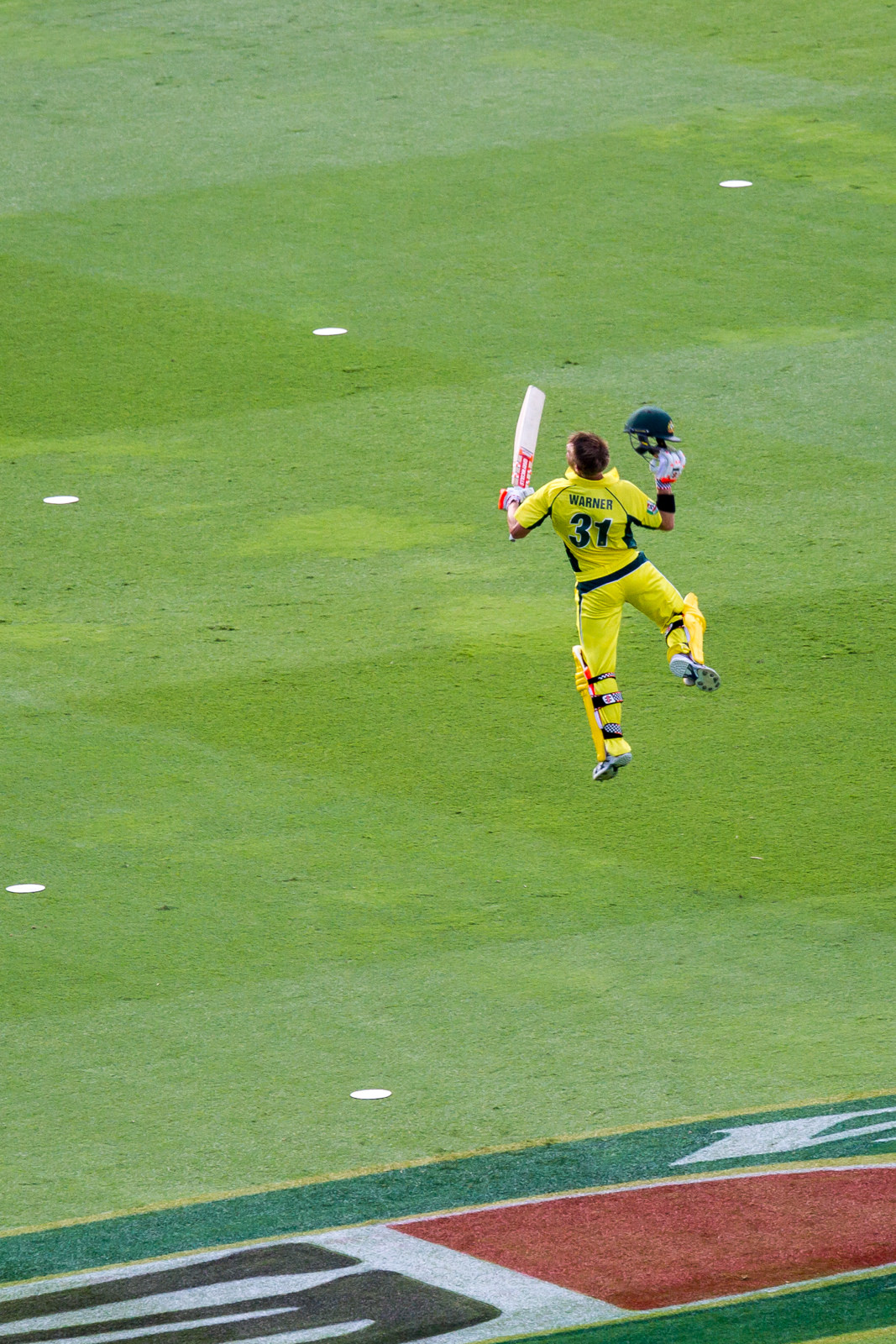
Warner celebrating his century in the fifth ODI against India at the Sydney Cricket Ground in 2016

In that same match, Warner also became the second opener in Test cricket history, after India's Sunil Gavaskar, to score three consecutive Test hundreds twice in his career, and the only Australian since Adam Gilchrist to score three consecutive hundreds (a feat Warner had done twice in just 13 months), while completing his 4,000 Test career runs as the 4th fastest Aussie batsman, the top three being the legendary Don Bradman, Matthew Hayden and Neil Harvey respectively.

On 3 January 2017, while playing against Pakistan at the Sydney Cricket Ground, he became only the fifth cricketer to score a century before lunch on the first day of a Test match, after Victor Trumper, Charlie Macartney, Don Bradman and Majid Khan. Of the five, he was the first to do so in Australia.

In Australia's second innings, with the team in need of quick runs, Warner clobbered a half century in a rapid 23 deliveries, making it the second fastest Test fifty of all time and the fastest by an Australian in the format. In the scheduled five ODIs against Pakistan, Warner progressed in a slow start but made two centuries in the final two ODIs at Sydney and Adelaide. At the 2017 Allan Border Awards, he was awarded Australia's ODI Player of the year and the elusive AB Medal.

His two centuries made him man of the series and in the following days, he ascended to the top of the ICC ODI Player Batting Rankings – marking his ascent to the top of ODI rankings his first.

He was later rested for the Chappell–Hadlee Trophy series in New Zealand, joining the second group of players in Dubai in preparation for a four-test series in India.

On 6 September 2017, while playing against Bangladesh at the Zohur Ahmed Chowdhury Stadium, Chittagong, he became the sixth Australian player to score back-to-back test hundreds in Asia after Allan Border, Bob Simpson, Damien Martyn, Michael Hussey and Michael Clarke.

On 28 September 2017 he played in his 100th ODI and became the first batsman for Australia and 8th batsman overall to score a century in his 100th ODI after Gordon Greenidge, Chris Cairns, Mohammad Yousuf, Kumar Sangakkara, Chris Gayle, Marcus Trescothick and Ramnaresh Sarwan. On 27 December 2017, Warner scored a century in MCG during 2017–18 Ashes series, and on 5 January 2018, his 3rd consecutive half-century in the SCG. On 27 October 2019, he scored his maiden T20I century, becoming the third Aussie to score centuries in all three formats of the game.

On 30 November 2019, Warner became the first batsman to score a triple century at Adelaide Oval with a score of 335* against Pakistan. He was the seventh Australian batsman to score a triple century, and the fourth to do so at an Australian ground. This score saw Warner surpass Sir Donald Bradman (334) and Mark Taylor (334*) to hold the second highest Test score by an Australian batsman, behind only Matthew Hayden.

On 6 June 2024, in Australia's first match of the 2024 T20 World Cup against Oman, Warner became Australia's highest run scorer in T20 Internationals surpassing Aaron Finch.

=== International captaincy ===
David Warner's record as captain
	Matches	Won	Lost	Drawn	Tied	No result	Win %
One Day Internationals	3	3	0	0	0	0	100%
Twenty20 Internationals	9	8	1	0	0	0	88.88%
Date last Updated:		30 October 2018					

When regular captain Steve Smith was rested for the end of the 2016 ODI series against Sri Lanka, Warner led the team for rest of the tour. In the fifth ODI at Pallekele, Warner scored the first century by an Australian batsmen in Sri Lanka in an ODI. Australia won all five matches he captained (three ODIs and two T20Is), won the ODI series 4–1 and the T20I series 2–0. He again deputised as captain for the 2017–18 Trans-Tasman Tri-Series (also involving New Zealand and England), with Australia winning the competition.

=== Ball-tampering incident and suspension ===
On the morning of 25 March 2018, during a Test match against South Africa, Steve Smith and Warner were forced to step down as captain and vice-captain of the Australian team, but still took to the field, after the ICC found Smith guilty of being "party to a decision to attempt to change the condition of the ball". The day before, opening batsman Cameron Bancroft was seen using yellow sandpaper for ball tampering during South Africa's second innings. Smith had admitted that the "leadership group" had discussed ball tampering during the lunch break, but did not name those involved.

Cricket Australia launched a separate investigation into the incident as a matter of urgency, led by Executive general manager Team Performance Pat Howard, along with Senior Legal Counsel and Head of Integrity Iain Roy. Their interviews of players and support staff began on 26 March 2018. CA CEO James Sutherland joined the investigators in South Africa. On 27 March 2018, before the findings of that investigation were handed down, specialist opening batter Matt Renshaw was urgently recalled to the squad from Australia for the Fourth Test.

On 27 March 2018, Sutherland announced that as a result of the preliminary investigation Smith, Warner and Bancroft had been charged with bringing the game into disrepute, suspended and sent home. He said that further sanctions against the trio would be announced within 24 hours. He added that as well as Renshaw, Joe Burns and Glenn Maxwell had been recalled to the squad for the Fourth Test to replace them. While he also announced that Tim Paine had been appointed as the captain for the upcoming Fourth Test, there was no announcement as to who would fill Warner's previous role as vice-captain. The Cricket Australia board convened on 28 March 2018 to determine the sanctions to be imposed on Smith, Warner and Bancroft. Warner was found to be responsible for the development of the plan to alter the condition of the ball and instructing Bancroft on how to do it, including demonstrating the technique to him. He was also found to have misled match officials by concealing his knowledge of the plan and not voluntarily reporting his involvement. As a result, Warner was banned from playing international and Australian domestic cricket for 1 year, must perform 100 hours of community service, and was permanently banned from leadership positions.

At the same time, Warner's contract with personal sponsor LG Electronics was due for renewal. On 28 March 2018, they announced that they had decided not to continue their commercial relationship with him in light of the recent controversial events and dropped him as the brand ambassador of the LG Electronic Company. Later that day, Warner's contract with Asics was terminated; the company announced that it was a result of the prior weekend's events in Cape Town and following the sanctions made by Cricket Australia.

On 28 March 2018, it was announced by a team executive that Warner had stood down from the captaincy of his IPL team, Sunrisers Hyderabad, and after the Cricket Australia sanctions announced, Warner was banned from the 2018 IPL. Warner broke his silence by posting on Twitter on 29 March. He apologized for his part in the incident, and took responsibility for it. He said that he would spend some time with his family, friends and trusted advisers, and would make another statement in the coming days.

In April 2018, Surrey head coach and former Australian cricketer Michael Di Venuto stated that he would be open to David Warner and Steven Smith playing for his county team.

=== Return to international cricket ===
In April 2019, he was named in Australia's squad for the 2019 Cricket World Cup. After missing the 2018–19 season, Warner was awarded a national contract by Cricket Australia for the 2019–20 season. On 1 June 2019, Warner played in Australia's opening match of the Cricket World Cup, against Afghanistan, at the County Ground in Bristol and was awarded player of the match for scoring 89 not out off 114 balls. He was also named player of the match in Australia's third match against Pakistan. Here he made 107, his first century on returning to international cricket. On 20 June 2019, in the match against Bangladesh, Warner scored 166 runs, becoming the first batsman to score two 150+ scores in the Cricket World Cup. Nine days later, in the match against New Zealand, Warner scored his 13,000th run in international cricket. He finished the tournament as the leading run-scorer for Australia and with 647 runs in ten matches, he also finished as the second highest run-scorer in the entire tournament behind Rohit Sharma.

In July 2019, he was named in Australia's squad for the 2019 Ashes series in England. However, he had a poor series, scoring only 95 runs over 10 innings at an average of 9.5. His only score of note was 61 at Headingley, that being his only score above 50, whilst he made a pair at Old Trafford and was dismissed seven times by Stuart Broad during the series.

On 27 October 2019, in the first T20I match against Sri Lanka, Warner scored his first century in T20I cricket, from just 56 balls, becoming the third Australian batsman to score centuries in all three formats of the international game after Shane Watson and Glenn Maxwell. He continued his good form with an unbeaten 60 in the second T20I and 57 in the third. He scored a total of 217 runs (most ever runs by an Australian in a three-match T20I series) and was awarded the player of the series. On 30 November 2019, Warner scored his maiden Test Triple century, scoring 335 not out against Pakistan, which is the second-highest individual score for an Australian Test batsman behind Matthew Hayden's 380 and also saw Warner surpassing the record of Azhar Ali's 302 to register the highest ever individual score in an innings of a day/night test match. He also became the second batsman to score a triple century in a pink ball test.

On 14 January 2020, in the first ODI match against India, Warner completed his 5000 runs in One Day Internationals becoming the fastest Australian and fourth fastest batsman in the world to reach this milestone. On 16 July 2020, Warner was named in a 26-man preliminary squad of players to begin training ahead of a possible tour to England following the COVID-19 pandemic. On 14 August 2020, Cricket Australia confirmed that the fixtures would be taking place, with Warner included in the touring party.

Warner was included in the ODI, T20I and Test squads for India's tour of Australia taking place from November 2020 to January 2021. After scoring 69 and 83 runs in the first and second ODI respectively, he sustained a groin injury while fielding in the second innings of the second ODI and was ruled out for the remaining ODI, T20Is and the first two Tests. Following his return for the final two Tests, he failed to make any major impact after scoring just 67 runs across the four innings at an average of 16.75.

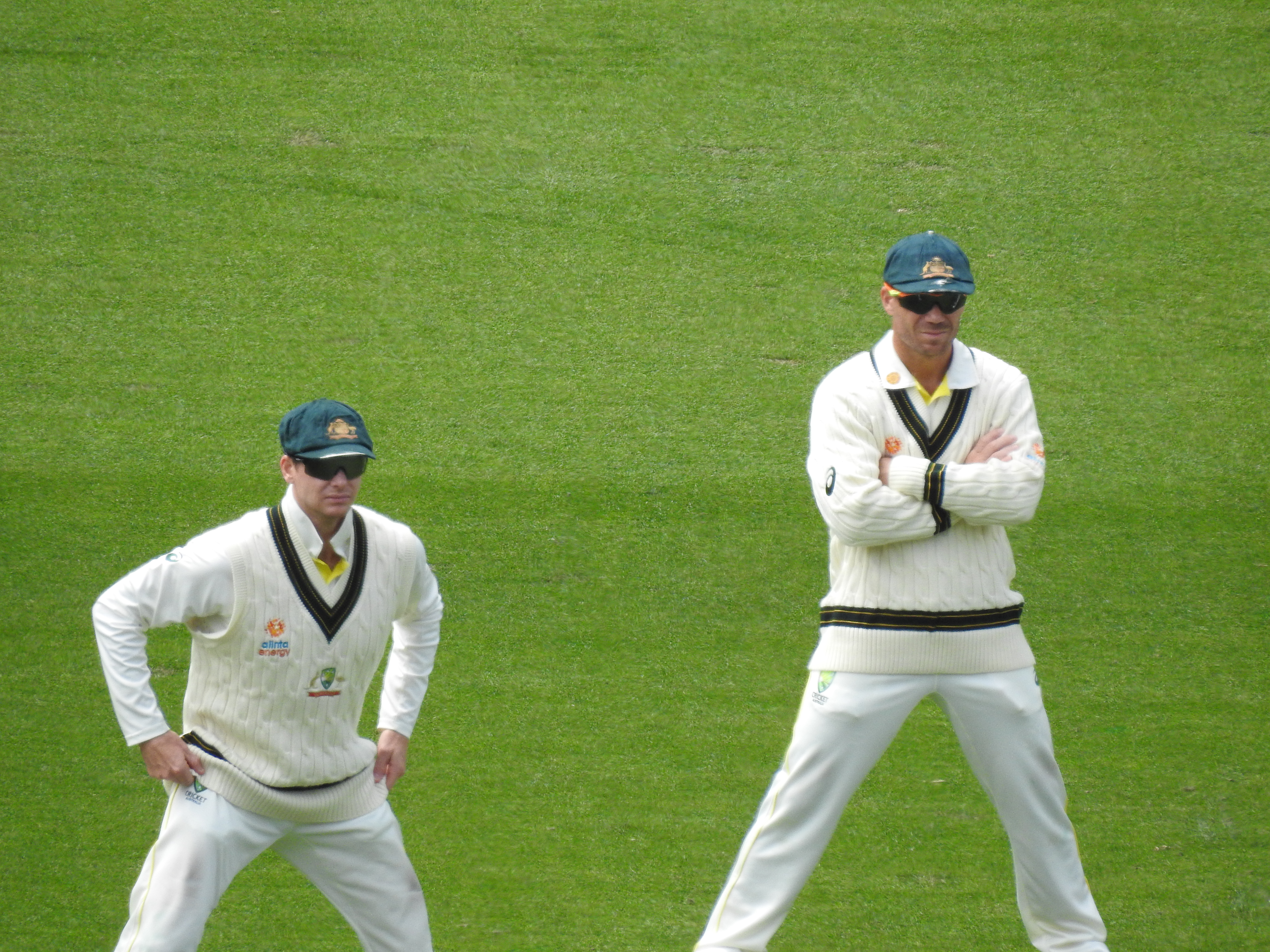
Steve Smith (left) and David Warner fielding in the slips against England during the 2021–22 Ashes series

In August 2021, Warner was named in Australia's squad for the 2021 ICC Men's T20 World Cup. He entered the T20 World Cup following a disappointing IPL season with Sunrisers Hyderabad, however he quickly turned around his form around and went on to play a crucial role for Australia in the tournament. He scored 289 runs (second-highest in the tournament) with three half-centuries including one in the final where he scored 53 off 38 balls helping Australia win their maiden T20 World Cup and was named Player of the Tournament. In November 2021, Warner was named in Australia's squad for the 2021–22 Ashes taking place in Australia. He scored 273 runs across 8 innings at an average of 34.12, he scored two fifties and also made a pair at Hobart in the series.

During Australia's 2022 tour of Pakistan, Warner failed to impress, scoring 169 runs in 5 innings, at an average of 33.80 and scored 2 fifties with a high score of 68. Warner had also missed the 3 match ODI series and the one-off T20I. However, Warner performed considerably better against Sri Lanka during Australia's 2022 tour of Sri Lanka; as he scored 130 runs in 3 innings, at an average of 65.00, with a high score of 70 during the T20I series and was the leading run scorer. Warner was not able to translate this during the ODI series, as he scored 155 runs in five innings at and average of 31.0 and reached a high score of 99 during the fourth ODI, before being stumped by Niroshan Dickwella. This became the second time a batsman was dismissed on 99 in an ODI by the way of stumping, the first being VVS Laxman in November 2002. Warner failed to impress again during the test series, as during the first innings of the first test, he scored 25 runs off of 24 balls before being dismissed. In the second innings, Warner scored a four and a six to win the first test match by 10 wickets, as the target was 5 runs. In the first innings of the second test, Warner scored 5 runs off of 13 balls before being dismissed. He scored 24 runs off of 44 balls in the second innings, where Australia collapsed and were bowled out for 151 runs. Sri Lanka won the second test match by an innings an 39 runs and drew the series 1–1. Warner finished the test series with 64 runs in 4 innings, with a high score of 25 and a batting average of 21.33.

In September 2022, Warner was named in Australia's squad for the 2022 ICC Men's T20 World Cup. He had a poor T20 World Cup scoring only 44 runs in 4 matches.

Warner made his return to form in series against England, in the first match he scored 86 runs. In the final match of series, he scored a century and his 269 run partnership with Travis Head was the highest stand for any wicket in ODIs at the Melbourne Cricket Ground, he was also named Player of the series.

On 27 December, Warner scored a double century in the second Test in the series against South Africa, this was Warner's first test ton since January 2020. On a day with many milestones, Warner passed 8000 test runs. He also became the first Australian since Ricky Ponting to score a century and only the second batsman to score a double century in his 100th Test match.

In the 2023 Ashes, Warner scored 285 runs at average of 28.50. He only passed 50 twice with a highest score of 66.

In September 2023, Warner was named in Australia's squad for the 2023 ICC Cricket World Cup in India. Australia started the tournament slow, losing their first two matches but then went on to win all the matches in the tournament including the final. In the fourth group stage match against Pakistan, Warner scored an impressive 163 runs off 124 balls and helped Australia win by 62 runs. Five days later, he scored his second consecutive century in the World Cup against Netherlands and surpassed Ricky Ponting to score the most centuries in the World Cup (6) by an Australian. In the semi-final against South Africa, he became the third batsman after Rohit Sharma and Sachin Tendulkar to complete 500 runs twice in World Cup tournaments. In the final, he missed out with the bat scoring 7 off 3 balls but put in a strong fielding display as Australia beat India to clinch their sixth World Cup title with Warner winning his second. He finished as Australia's top run scorer with 535 runs which included two centuries and two half centuries.

On 9 February 2024, Warner played his 100th T20I in the first match of the T20I series against the West Indies at the Blundstone Arena. He scored 70 off 36 balls, earning him player of the match in a 10 run victory for Australia. This made Warner the first Australian to reach 100 appearances for Australia in each format of the game. He was also player of the match in his 100th game of each format. On 13 February, in the third T20I against West Indies, Warner scored 81 runs off 49 balls. Despite his performance, his team lost but went on to win the series 2–1. He was named the player of the series for scoring a total of 173 runs across the three matches.

In May 2024, he was named in Australia's squad for the 2024 ICC Men's T20 World Cup tournament. On 24 June, he played his final match with Australia, losing by 24 runs to India in the Super 8 stage, where Australia were eliminated from the tournament.

=== Retirement ===
On 3 June 2023, just before the ICC World Test Championship 2021–2023 final against India, David Warner announced that the New Year's Test at the SCG against Pakistan would be his last, also hinting that his international retirement would come after the 2024 T20 World Cup.

In the first match of the three match test series between Australia and Pakistan, Warner scored 164, his 26th and his final Test century. On 1 January 2024, Warner announced his retirement from ODI cricket ahead of his farewell test match against Pakistan at the SCG but said that he would make himself available for the 2025 Champions Trophy if he was still playing decent cricket. In the third test match, he scored 57 in his final test innings helping Australia complete a 3–0 sweep over Pakistan to win the series.

During the T20I series against the West Indies, at the post-match presentation ceremony of the third and last T20I, Warner confirmed his retirement plan from international cricket after the 2024 T20 World Cup. On 25 June 2024, Warner confirmed his retirement from international cricket after Australia were knocked out from the 2024 T20 World Cup. However, he kept the possibility of a return in the 2025 Champions Trophy open. Australia's national selector George Bailey later confirmed that Warner would not be considered for the tournament.

== Playing style ==
Warner is known for his aggressive left-handed batting style favoring the aerial route and for his ability to switch hit, using the back of his bat or by taking a right-handed stance. He prefers to score on his off side, and has a very high strike rate as a Test batsman. In all of his Test centuries (as of 26 December 2017), he had never had a strike rate of below 52.5, and only 3 of below 72.

He is an athletic fielder and also a part-time spin bowler. His bowling style is rare in that he mixes medium-pace bowling with his more usual leg spin bowling. At 170 cm in stature, Warner generates his batting power from strong forearms and his low centre of gravity allows him to get underneath deliveries and hit them high in the air. In a Twenty20 match for New South Wales in 2009, he hooked a six off Shaun Tait that landed on the roof of the Adelaide Oval, only a month after hooking the same bowler 20 rows back at the SCG.

== Cricket controversies ==
On 12 June 2013, Warner was dropped for Australia's second match in 2013 ICC Champions Trophy match against New Zealand following an attack on Joe Root. The event happened hours after Saturday's loss to England at Edgbaston. According to the sports journalist Pat Murphy, the incident took place at 2 am at the Walkabout bar in the centre of Birmingham, UK. On 13 June 2013, Cricket Australia announced that Warner was to be fined £7,000 (AU $11,500) and would not play for his country until the first Ashes Test on 10 July 2013. Warner subsequently missed the rest of the 2013 ICC Champions Trophy and the tour matches against Somerset and Worcestershire.

Warner attracted further controversy soon after. On 27 July 2013, whilst playing for Australia A against South Africa A in Pretoria he was involved in an on-field altercation with South Africa A wicket-keeper Thami Tsolekile. This was deemed serious enough for the umpires to step in twice; however, no formal complaints were made and Warner tweeted later in the day describing it as "friendly banter". Despite this, writers called into question his return to the Australia squad for the third Ashes Test against England, which seemed likely after scoring 193 in the first innings of this match. He was eventually recalled.

In 2015, former New Zealand captain Martin Crowe called for a yellow-card and red-card system to be introduced to international cricket to curb Warner's "thuggish" on-field behaviour, stating that Warner was "the most juvenile cricketer I have seen on a cricket field".

On 4 March 2018, during tea in the 1st Test in Durban, Warner was involved in an altercation with South African Wicket-keeper Quinton de Kock. De Kock had allegedly made a vulgar comment about Warner's wife Candice. Warner fired back at De Kock and was restrained by teammates Usman Khawaja and Steve Smith. Warner was charged with a Level 2 Offence and bringing the game to disrepute by the International Cricket Council and was given three demerit points and was fined 75% of his match fee.

On 22 March 2018, after being dismissed in the first innings of the Third Test of that series held in Cape Town, Warner responded to baiting from a spectator which escalated into an unsavoury heated exchange as he walked to the dressing room. The spectator was subsequently ejected from the ground. In the same series, he was instrumental in bringing the game into disrepute by orchestrating changing the condition of the match ball with sandpaper, for which he was given a 12-month ban.

== International centuries ==
As of December 2023, Warner has scored 26 Test centuries, 22 ODI centuries and 1 T20I century, totalling 49 centuries in his international career.

== Awards ==
- ICC Test Team of the Year: 2014, 2015, 2016, 2017
- ICC ODI Team of the Year: 2016, 2017
- ICC Test Team of the Decade: 2011–2020
- ICC ODI Team of the Decade: 2011–2020
- ICC Men's Player of the Month: November 2021.
- Allan Border Medal: 2016, 2017, 2020
- Australian Test Player of the Year: 2016
- Australian One Day International Player of the Year: 2017, 2018, 2023
- Australian Twenty20 International Player of the Year: 2020
- Bradman Young Cricketer of the Year: 2012
- Indian Premier League Orange Cap: 2015, 2017, 2019
- ICC Men's T20 World Cup Player of the Tournament: 2021
- Australian One Day Cup Player of the Tournament: 2020–21

== Personal life ==
Warner married Australian former Ironwoman Candice Falzon in April 2015. They have three daughters. He lives in Maroubra, a suburb of Sydney and is a supporter of the Sydney Roosters in the National Rugby League.

On 7 April 2026, Warner was charged by New South Wales Police with Drunk driving following a random breath test in Maroubra in east Sydney. He was reported to have blown a Blood Alcohol Reading of 0.104, over twice the legal limit in New South Wales. In July, Warner entered a guilty plea. Warner was fined $1,500 and had a conviction recorded.

== Endorsements and commercial activities ==
Warner has appeared in advertising and brand campaigns in Australia and overseas. In 2015 he fronted a KFC Australia cricket campaign on television and digital platforms, and in 2018 his official website listed partners including Gray-Nicolls, Channel Nine, Toyota, Nestlé Milo and the Make-A-Wish Foundation, according to the ABC.

Several personal sponsorships ended in the wake of the 2018 ball-tampering scandal: LG Electronics declined to renew his ambassador deal, and Asics terminated its contract with him the following day. Other media also reported sponsor exits during that week.

Warner's bat sponsorships have included Gray-Nicolls, a switch to Spartan during 2018, and a move to DSC ahead of the 2021 ICC Men's T20 World Cup. In December 2024 Gray-Nicolls announced Warner's return to the brand.

In July 2024 he was announced as a brand ambassador for online betting operator 1win, in a role covering marketing and social media campaigns.

In 2023, media reported that Warner won a Sydney District Court case against former bat sponsor Spartan Sports over unpaid endorsement fees, with the award stated to be in excess of A$420,000.

== Filmography ==
David Warner made his acting debut in a Telugu film Robinhood, with a cameo appearance.

Year	Title	Role	Notes	Ref.
2025	Robinhood	David Bhai	Debut Film/Cameo	

== See also ==
- List of cricketers who have scored centuries in both innings of a Test match
- List of cricketers who have carried the bat in international cricket
