= Operations of KFC by country =

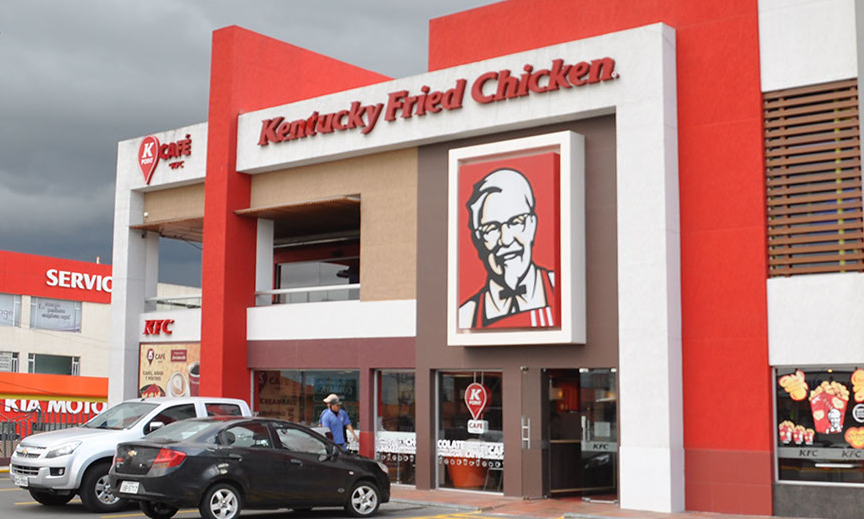
A KFC outlet in Quito, Ecuador; the largest market for the chain in the Caribbean and South America.

Map of countries with KFC franchises as of October 2025

KFC is a subsidiary of Yum! Brands, one of the largest restaurant companies in the world. KFC had sales of $23 billion in 2013. KFC is incorporated under Delaware General Corporation Law, and has its headquarters at 1441 Gardiner Lane, Louisville, Kentucky, in a three-story colonial style building known colloquially as the "White House" due to its resemblance to the US president's home. The headquarters contain executive offices and the company's research and development facilities.

By December 2013, there were 18,875 KFC outlets in 118 countries and territories. There are 4,563 outlets in China, 4,491 in the United States and 9,821 across the rest of the world. Outlets are owned by franchisees or directly by the company. Eleven percent of outlets are company owned, with the rest operated by franchise holders. Although capital intensive, company ownership allows for faster expansion of the chain.

Most restaurants are furnished with images of the company founder, Colonel Harland Sanders. As well as dine-in and take-out, many stand-alone KFC outlets offer a drive-through option. KFC offers a limited delivery service in a small number of markets. Units include express concessions and kiosks which feature a limited menu and operate in non-traditional locations such as filling stations, convenience stores, stadia, theme parks and colleges, where a full scale outlet would not be practical. Average annual sales per unit was $1.2 million in 2013. Worldwide, the daily average number of food orders at an outlet is 250, with most occurring within a two-hour peak period.

As Chairman and CEO of Yum!, Greg Creed ultimately has foremost responsibility for KFC operations. Sam Su is chairman and CEO of Yum!'s Chinese operations and Tony Lowings is the president and CEO of KFC, replacing Roger Eaton who retired in 2018. David Gibbs is president, CFO and COO of Yum! Brands, Inc. On March 7, 2019, KFC announced a new executive position "Chief Communications Officer" and Staci Rawls will fill that position.

== Africa ==
The company hopes to expand its African operations, where it is already the regional leader among US fast food chains. The company is slowly expanding across the African continent, opening 70 outlets, but progress has been hampered by sourcing issues, such as a lack of quality suppliers. The first three African countries in which KFC opened were South Africa in 1971, Egypt in 1989 and Mauritius in 1983. Mauritius has over 21 KFC outlets. Morocco has KFC outlets as well. Libya open first restaurant in 2021 without license in Tripoli. The first KFC in Senegal was opened in 2019.

== Asia ==
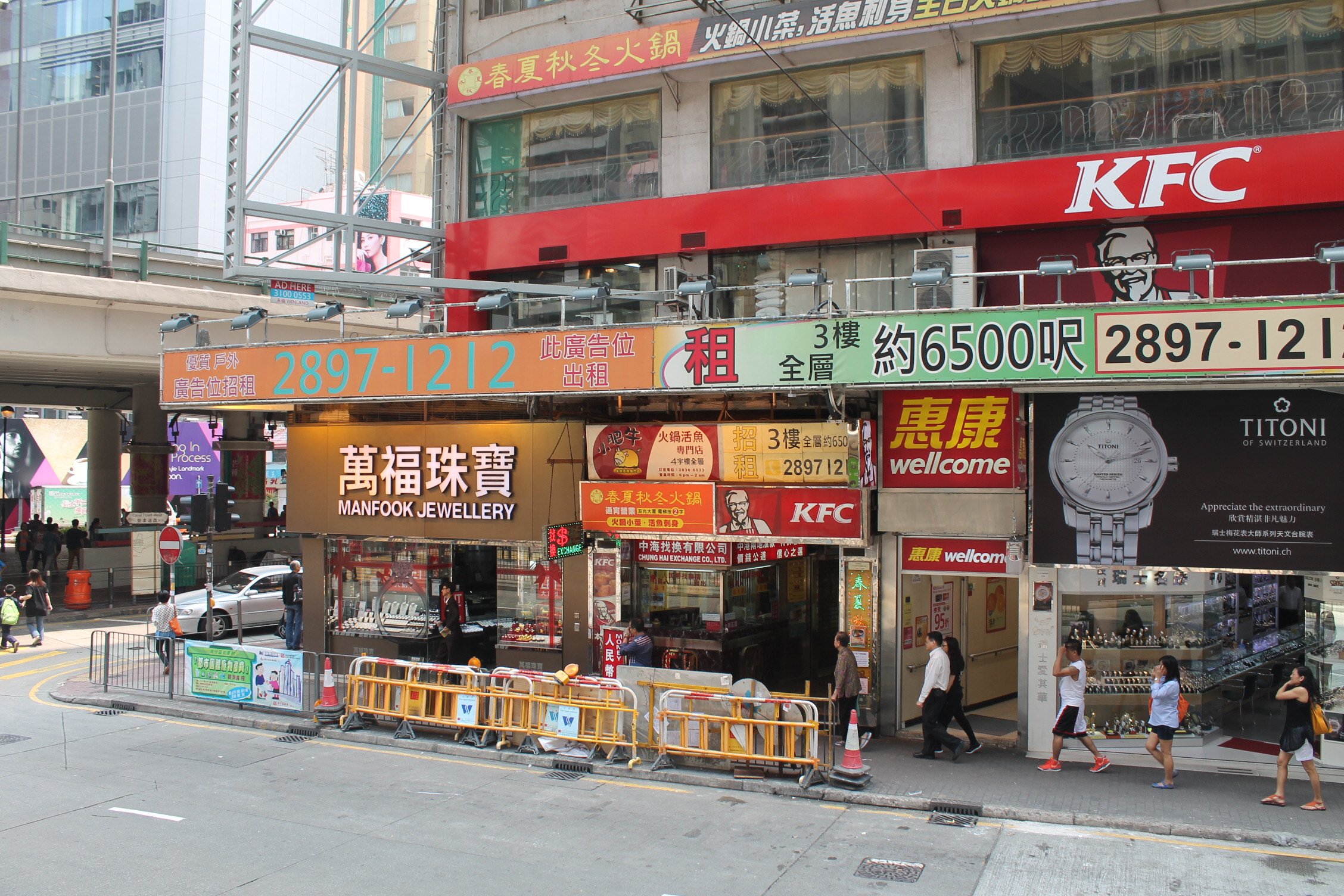
KFC outlet in Hong Kong Island, Hong Kong

KFC operates restaurants in several Asian countries.

In Sri Lanka, KFC was launched in 1995 at Majestic City. There were 62 KFC restaurants in Sri Lanka as of April 2024. It is currently operated by Cargills Ceylon PLC.

In Singapore, the first KFC franchise was opened in 1977 along Somerset Road. In 1993, KFC Singapore was the first KFC in Asia to develop and launch the Zinger. KFC restaurants in Singapore are currently owned and operated by KFC (Malaysia) Holdings Bhd.

In Cambodia, KFC first opened on Monivong Boulevard in Phnom Penh in 2008.

In Myanmar, the first KFC outlet was officially opened on Bogyoke Aung San Road in Yangon in 2015.

In the Philippines, KFC opened their first store in Asia in 1967.

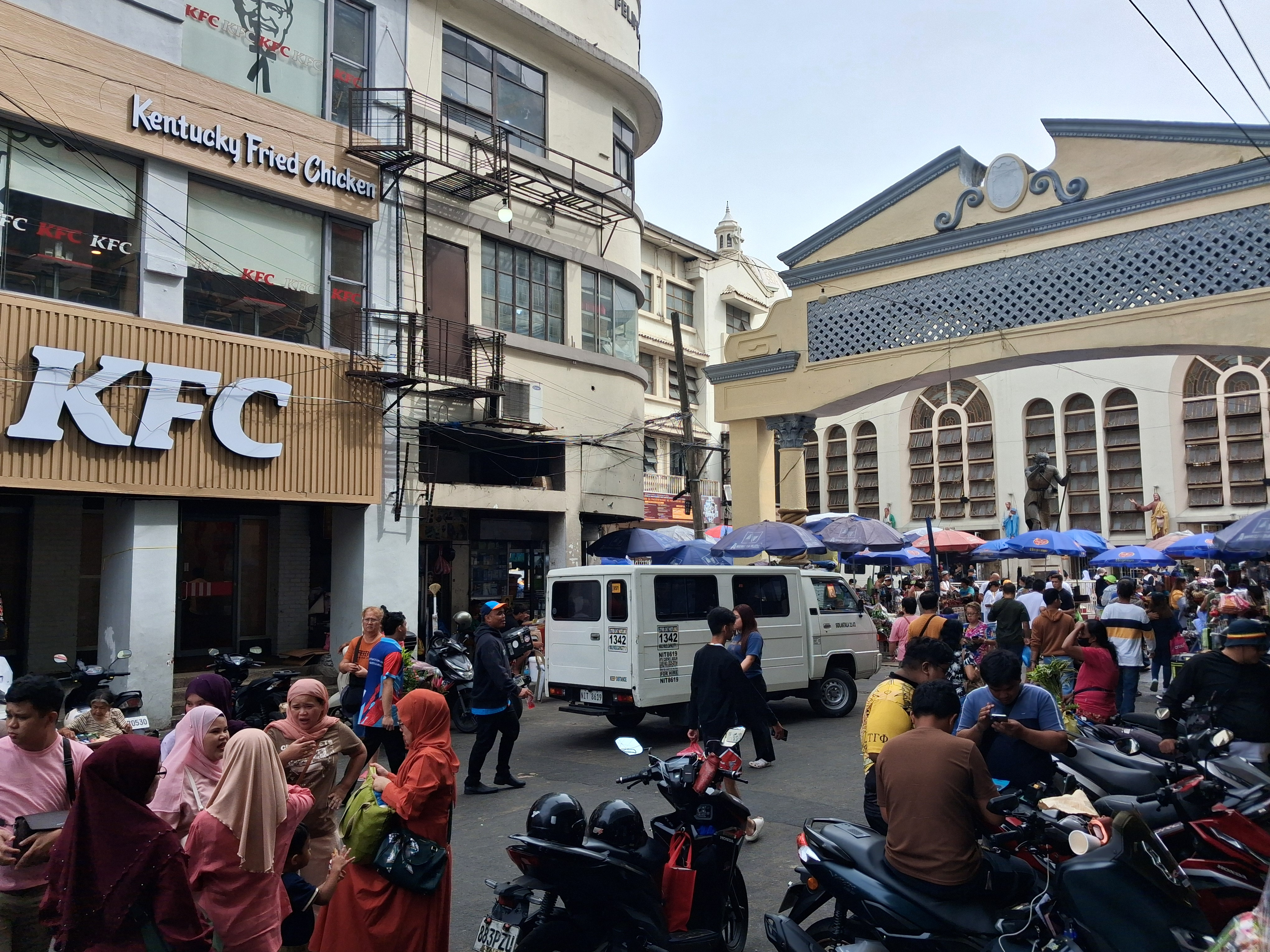
KFC in the Philippines

In Taiwan, KFC entered the market in 1984 and opened its first store in 1985 in Taipei City. The 100th store in Taiwan opened in 1999. It was the second-largest fast-food chain restaurant in Taiwan until Mos Burger exceeded the number of branches of KFC in 2008. Now KFC is the third-largest fast-food chain restaurant, with 137 stores as of 2017.

=== Bangladesh ===
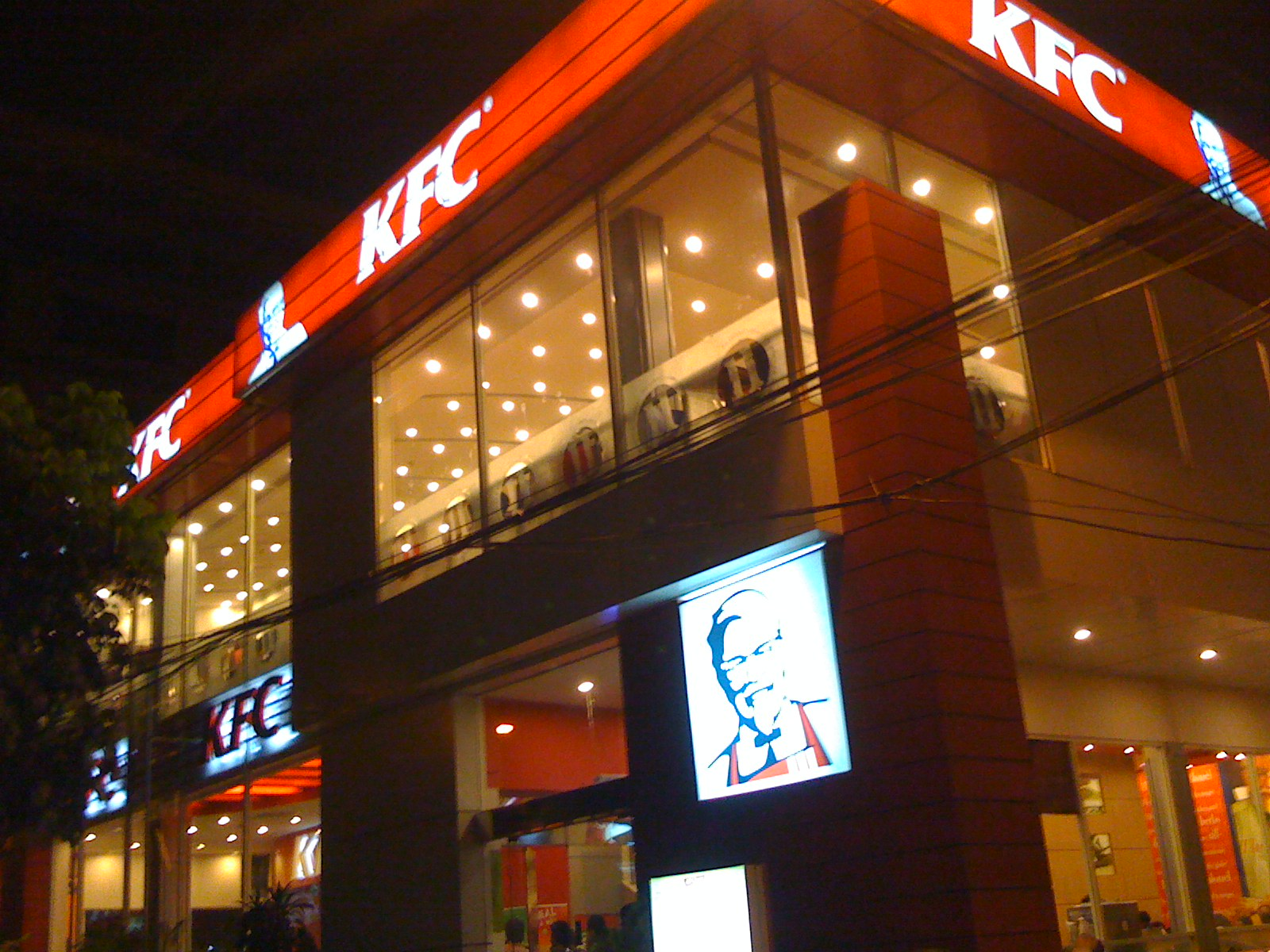
KFC outlet in Sonargaon Janapath, Uttara

In Bangladesh, the first KFC outlet was opened at Gulshan in 2006. KFC operates 46 outlets across twelve cities — 34 in Dhaka, 3 in Chittagong, and one each in Cox's Bazar, Narayanganj, Bogra, Khulna, Gazipur, Mymensingh, Barisal, Rajshahi and Comilla.

Variation in the menu includes the Fiery Grill'd and Tom Yum. Bangladesh is the first, and so far, only country that has served beef in its outlets.

=== Pakistan ===
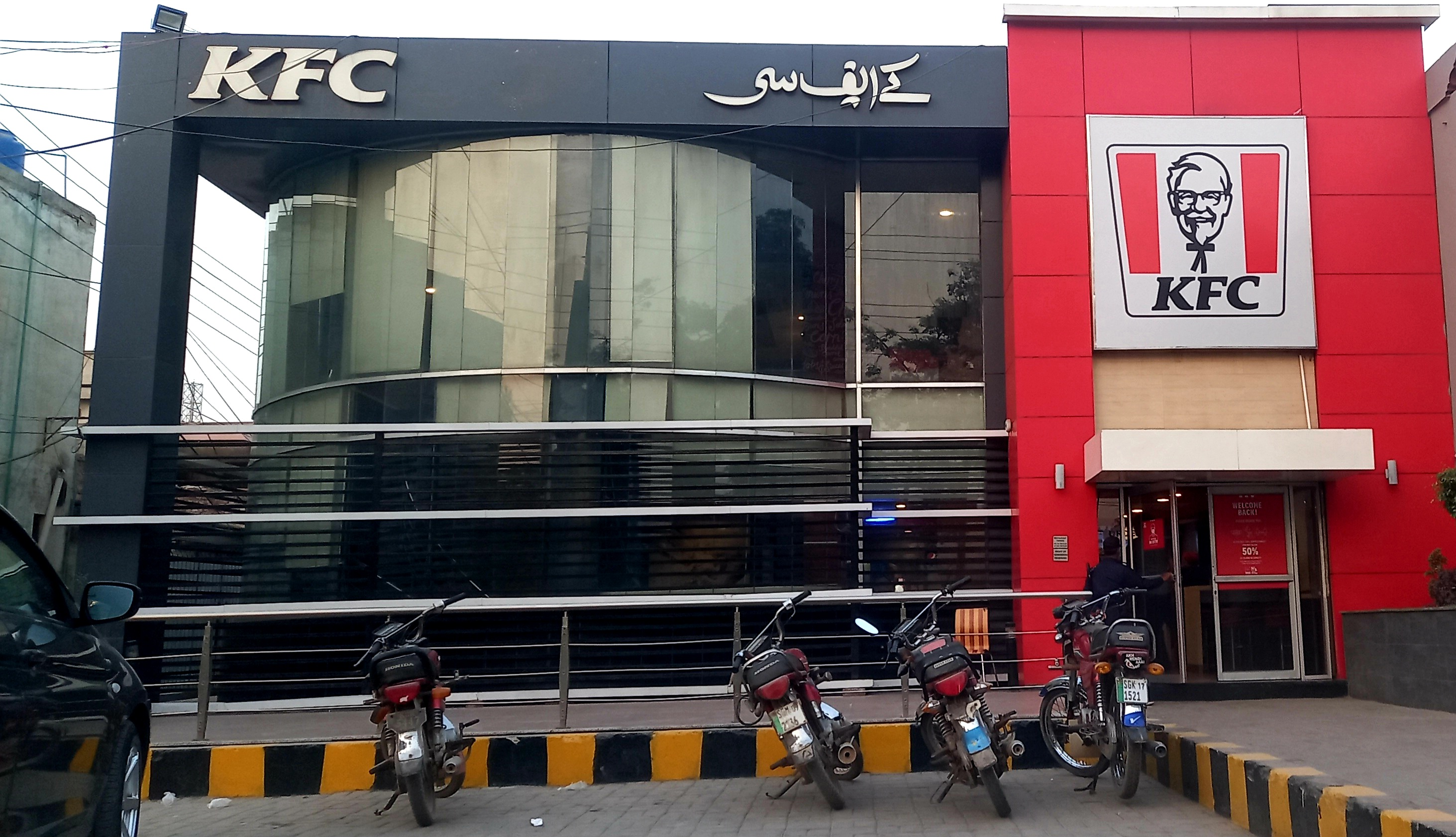
KFC outlet, University Road, Sargodha

In Pakistan, the first outlet of KFC was opened in Gulshan-e-Iqbal, Karachi in 1997. KFC has a presence in 31 major cities of Pakistan with more than 150 outlets nationwide, out of which 38 are in Karachi and 31 are in Lahore.

KFC Pakistan's menu consists of burgers, sandwiches, fried chicken, nuggets, hot wings, French fries, rice dishes, twister wraps and drinks. KFC in Pakistan introduced a new food item named "Zingeratha" which is a fusion of the Zinger and paratha, a traditional bread in Pakistan. In January 2020, KFC Pakistan introduced Thai sweet chili wings and Buffalo wings.

=== China ===
KFC is the largest restaurant chain in China, with 12,600 outlets as of the end of September 2025. They are operated by the Yum! China division. KFC became the first Western fast food company in China after its first outlet opened in Qianmen, Beijing in November 1987.

Local food items include rice congee and tree fungus salad, with an average of 50 different menu items per store.

In December 2012, the chain faced allegations that some of its suppliers injected antiviral drugs and growth hormones into poultry in ways that violated food safety regulations. This resulted in the chain severing its relationship with 100 suppliers and agreeing to "actively co-operate" with a government investigation into its use of antibiotics. KFC China sales in January 2013 were down 41 percent against the previous year. To counter sluggish sales, the menu was revamped in 2014.

In July 2014, Chinese authorities closed down the Shanghai operations of the OSI Group amidst allegations that it had supplied KFC with expired meat. Yum! immediately terminated its contract with the supplier and stated that the revelation had led to a "significant [and] negative" decline in sales.

KFC opened its first outlet in Tibet in March 2016.

=== India ===
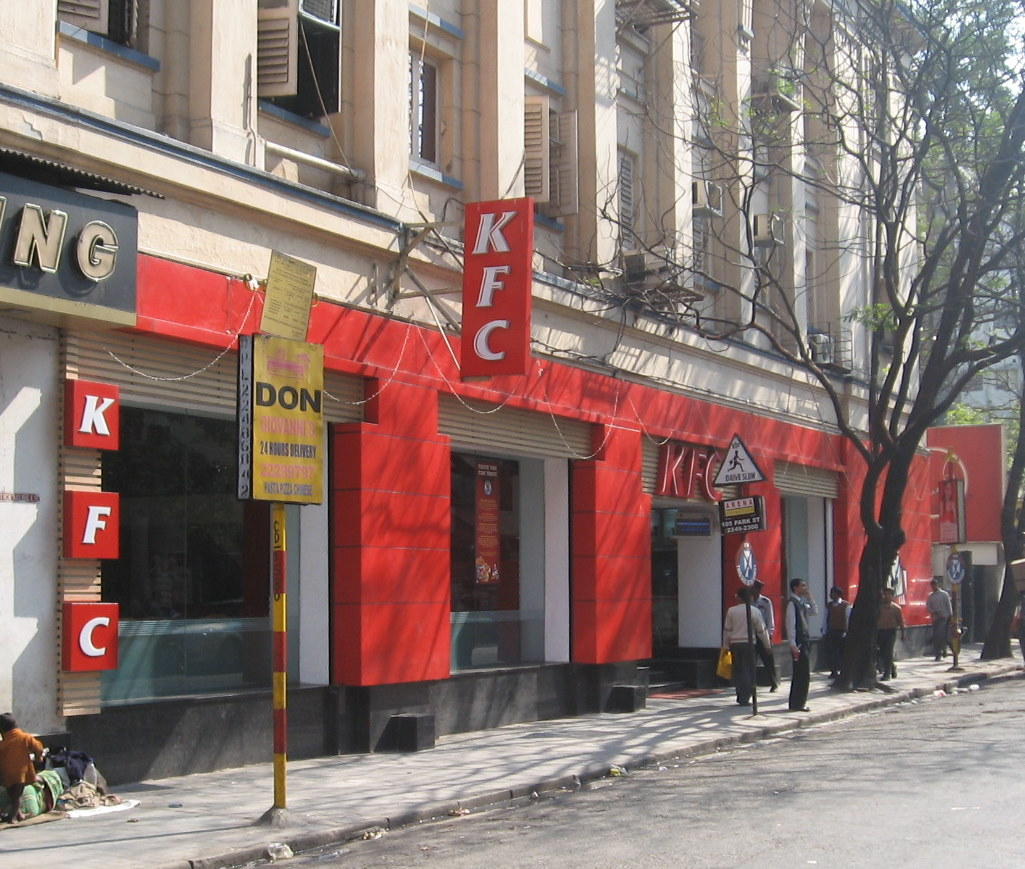
KFC outlet on Middleton Row in Kolkata

There are 1,191 KFC outlets in India. The company has adapted the standard KFC offerings to Indian tastes and the menu options in India include the Hot & Crispy Chicken and Fiery Grilled bucket options, the Chicken Zinger, Krushers, Rice Bowlz and the more recently launched 5-in-1 Meal Box. The business was refranchised in October 2015 after Yum concluded a year-and-a-half-long exercise to reorganize its business under larger, well-capitalized franchisees. In this regard, about a third of its outlets, operated by several of its franchisees, have been sold to a newly formed entity — Sapphire Foods India Pvt. Ltd. The new entity is owned by a consortium of four private equity funds, led by Samara Capital. The other investors are CX Partners, Goldman Sachs Group Inc. and a fourth fund, said a top executive at the local arm of the American food company.

The first Indian KFC was a two-story outlet on the fashionable Brigade Road in Bangalore in June 1995. According to journalist Michael White, the company could not have chosen a "more difficult venue for its maiden entrée into the country". Bangalore housed the headquarters of the Karnataka Rajya Raitha Sangha, one of the most influential, vocal and anti-foreign investment farmers' associations in the country. The first outlet suffered protests from anti-globalisation and environmental campaigners as well as local farmers, who objected to the chain bypassing local producers. Many Indians were concerned about the onslaught of consumerism, the loss of national self-sufficiency, and the disruption of indigenous traditions. The protests came to a head in August 1995, when the Bangalore outlet was repeatedly ransacked. The KFC outlet in Bangalore demanded, and received, a police van permanently parked outside for a year. The outlet was closed on September 13, 1995, by local authorities, who claimed the company used illegally high amounts of monosodium glutamate (MSG) in its food. The outlet re-opened a few hours later as the result of an appeal by KFC to the Karnataka High Court. The company stated the recipe was no different than that used in any other KFC store. Rural activist M. D. Nanjundaswamy claimed KFC would adversely affect the health of the impoverished by diverting grain from poor people to make the more profitable animal feed. Environmentalist Maneka Gandhi joined the anti-KFC movement. A second outlet opened in Delhi but was closed by the authorities throughout November, purportedly for health reasons, but more likely to avoid a repetition of the Bangalore incident. The Delhi outlet soon closed permanently.

KFC began to expand outside of Bangalore in 2004, with a localized menu that was the most extensive meat-free menu across the chain's worldwide operations. It introduced a vegetarian menu that included rice meals, wraps and side dishes and, like McDonald's, served eggless mayonnaise and sauces. Unnat Varma, marketing director of KFC India, states "The vegetarian offerings have made the brand more relevant to a larger section of consumers and that is necessary for KFC's growth." KFC also began using Indian spices and cooking techniques to localize its chicken dishes. By 2008–09, KFC operated 34 outlets in India. In 2014, KFC launched the "So Veg, So Good" menu as part of an India-specific promotional strategy focused on enhancing their vegetarian range. The company launched the Chizza, a chicken fillet with pizza toppings, in December 2016. In 2016, KFC partnered with dabbawalas in Mumbai to deliver 5-in-1 Meal Boxes. In June 2026, it launched Watt a Box, a 5-in-1 Meal Box which can also charge phones.

In July 2025, ‘Hindu Raksha Dal terrorized KFC in Ghailzand over sawan.

In January 2026, KFC and Pizza Hut operators Sapphire Foods and Devyani International announced that they are going to merge in a US$934 million deal.

=== Indonesia ===
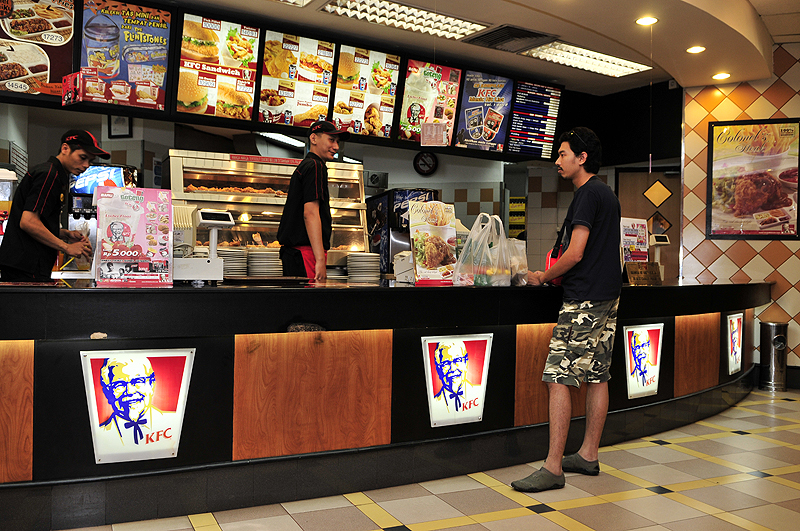
A counter at a KFC outlet in Bandung, Indonesia

In Indonesia, KFC is the largest Western restaurant chain, with 466 outlets as of December 2013, and 738 outlets as of September 2020. The chain has grown to hold an estimated 32 percent market share and menu items include spaghetti, wraps and chicken porridge. The master franchisee is PT Fastfood Indonesia.

The first outlet opened on Melawai Street in Jakarta in 1979. The Salim Group, Indonesia's largest conglomerate, became a major shareholder in 1990, which provided the company with funds for major expansion. Its master franchisee, PT Fastfood Indonesia, was publicly listed on the Indonesian Stock Exchange in 1993.

In November 2024, KFC Indonesia reported a net loss of 557.08 billion IDR (above US$36 million) during the third quarter of 2024. In response, PT Fastfood Indonesia closed 47 stores and laid off 2,274 employees by September 2024. PT Fastfood attributed the financial losses to the economic effects of the COVID-19 pandemic in Indonesia and the Gaza war.

=== Japan ===
KFC Japan was formed in 1970 as a joint venture between the American parent and the Japanese Mitsubishi Corporation. In December 1974, KFC Japan began to promote fried chicken as a Christmas meal. Eating KFC at Christmas time has become a "Traditional Christmas Eve Dinner" in Japan. As of 2013, Japan is the third-largest market for KFC after China and the United States with 1,200 outlets.

In December 2007, Mitsubishi assumed majority control of KFC Japan in a JP¥ 14.83 billion transaction.

=== Sri Lanka ===
In Sri Lanka, KFC was launched in 1995 at Majestic City. There were 62 KFC restaurants in Sri Lanka as of April 2024. It is currently operated by Cargills Ceylon PLC.

=== Malaysia ===
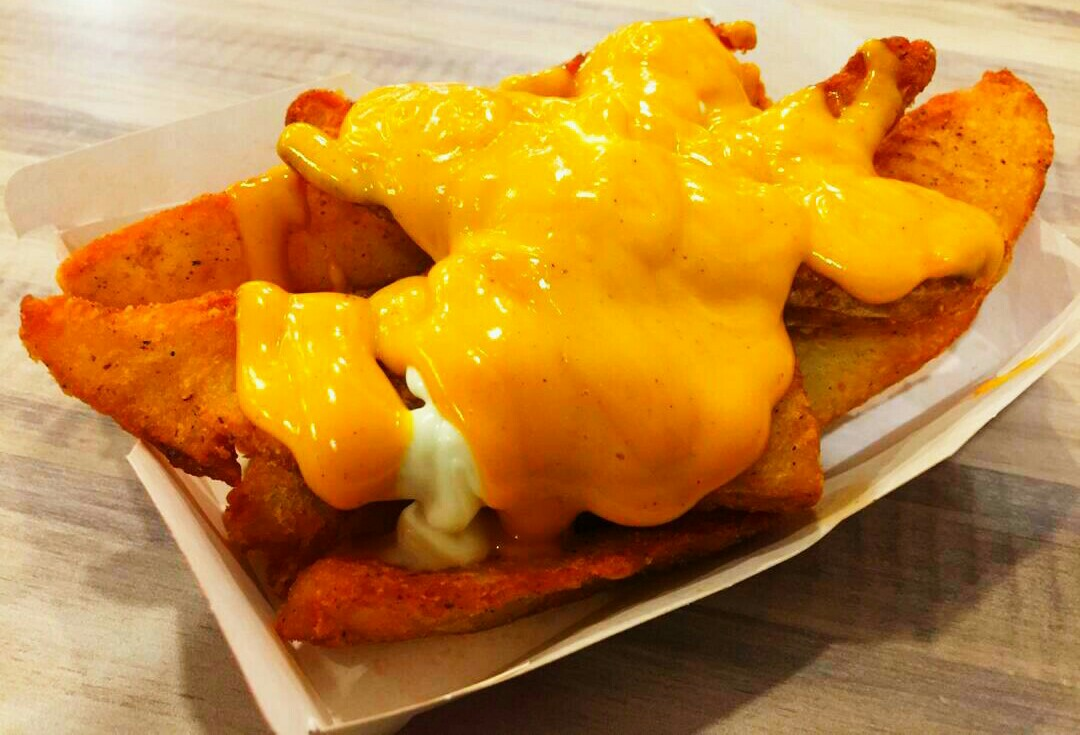
KFC "Cheezy" Wedges, available under the QSR operated KFC (in Malaysia, Cambodia and Brunei Darussalam). First introduced around 2005 in Malaysia, it is one of the best-selling items in the country.

Being one of its largest overseas markets, the Malaysian KFC traces its origin from January 1, 1973, from its first outlet in Jalan Tunku Abdul Rahman, Kuala Lumpur. In 2016, the brand has been crowned as the largest fast-food chain in Malaysia and dominating 45% of the local fast-food market shares, with its traditional rival McDonald's following in second, while its sister restaurant, Pizza Hut, spots at third place. By 2018, the restaurant has established a strong presence in the country, estimated to serve almost an equal proportion with the total population of Malaysia, with 25 million customers every month by its 14,000 employees.

Additionally, the KFC chicken nuggets also trace their origin from Malaysia before being expanded to many international outlets. Similar to other international KFC markets, the Malaysian KFC also featuring various localized and seasonal food items in addition to the universal KFC Menu. The Malaysian KFC customarily offers two types of fried chicken: Original and Hot & Spicy, moreover, other types of fried chickens and food products are also being periodically introduced to the local consumers. Among other common year-long regional items unique to the Malaysian market includes Colonel rice (derived from the local chicken rice), rice congee, zinger porridge, spicy nuggets, wrap, cheesy potato wedges, butterscotch bun and Nasi Lemak. Furthermore, being a predominantly Muslim country, all meats are slaughtered in accord to the Halal-method under the supervision of the Shariah Advisory Council and the Department of Islamic Development Malaysia.

The KFC business design in Malaysia is generally offering a mid-range dining option to cater the predominantly middle-class Malaysian population. The premise is typically large in area and able to accommodate the dining culture commonly practiced among the Malaysian society, a contrast to the primarily take-out model seen in the American market. Many of the Malaysian KFC also operate around the clock, offering drive-through and delivery service. In 2012, KFC began offering food delivery in Malaysia to continue to improve its service.

As of 2024, QSR Brands (M) Holdings Bhd, the shareholder of the company in Malaysia, is also responsible on managing 850 KFC outlets and managing over 30,000 people across Malaysia, Singapore, Brunei and Cambodia, with more than 600 of these outlets being located domestically in Malaysia, hence making the country one of the largest global market for the fast-food chain. The chain has been witnessed rapid expansion since the opening of its 250th Malaysian outlet on May 8, 1998, located in the Petronas Twin Towers, the 500th branch in Subang launched on January 15, 2011, and the 700th restaurant in Seremban on September 18, 2018.

Additionally, QSR Brands is also in change on handling over 500 Pizza Hut outlets in Malaysia and Singapore; similar to some international developments, many of these restaurants are being traditionally combined with a KFC premise.

In 1995, Projek Penyayang KFC was founded in an effort to provide food to more than 150 orphanages every quarter. The social service by the restaurant was then extended by the introduction of the Tabung Penyayang Fund in 1997, Add Hope Malaysia in 2006 and Add Hope Worldwide in 2007 as means to aid the local and international community.

The chain is also one of the earliest fast-food eateries in Malaysia to employ people with different abilities from its outlet in Jalan Imbi, Kuala Lumpur on November 15, 1986 (it has since relocated to Sentul Raya, Jalan Ipoh in 1992).

From the first fully operated KFC in the world run by speech-and hearing-impaired staff in Kuala Lumpur, the operation has expanded to its Malaysian operation in Tanjung Aru (Kota Kinabalu) and Saujana (Kuching) outlets in 1996. Similarly, the model has also being adopted by several KFC eateries in Egypt, India, Pakistan, Singapore and Thailand. To date, the establishment has employed more than 350 Malaysian individuals predominantly of speech and hearing impairment.

=== West Asia ===
The first KFC in the West Asia opened in 1973 in Kuwait. KFC operates in the region certified halal outlets, including the United Arab Emirates, Qatar, Bahrain, Oman, Jordan, Lebanon, Iraq and Saudi Arabia. KFC Israel existed from 1993 to 2013 and featured kosher restaurants. In December 2019 KFC has announced that it will be back to Israel until Christmas, planning to open dozens of restaurants by 2020. By January 2023, KFC had 16 branches in Israel. There has also been instances of violations of their certified halal and kosher restaurant models since the late 2010s.

In 2012 KFC opened in Ramallah in the Palestinian Authority^{[8]} and later expanded to Hebron,^{[9]} Bethlehem,^{[10]} Jenin^{[11]} and three separate outlets in Ramallah: the Ersal Branch (Bacri), Plaza Mall Branch and Masyoun Branch. In 2013, the New York Times reported that KFC was being smuggled into Gaza through tunnels.

In February 2025, IS Gida, operator of KFC restaurants in Turkey, filed for bankruptcy with over 7.7 billion lira ($214 million) in debt. In September, HD Holding announced that they bought the franchising rights and expected that the first branches will be reopened by the end of the year.

== Europe ==
=== United Kingdom ===
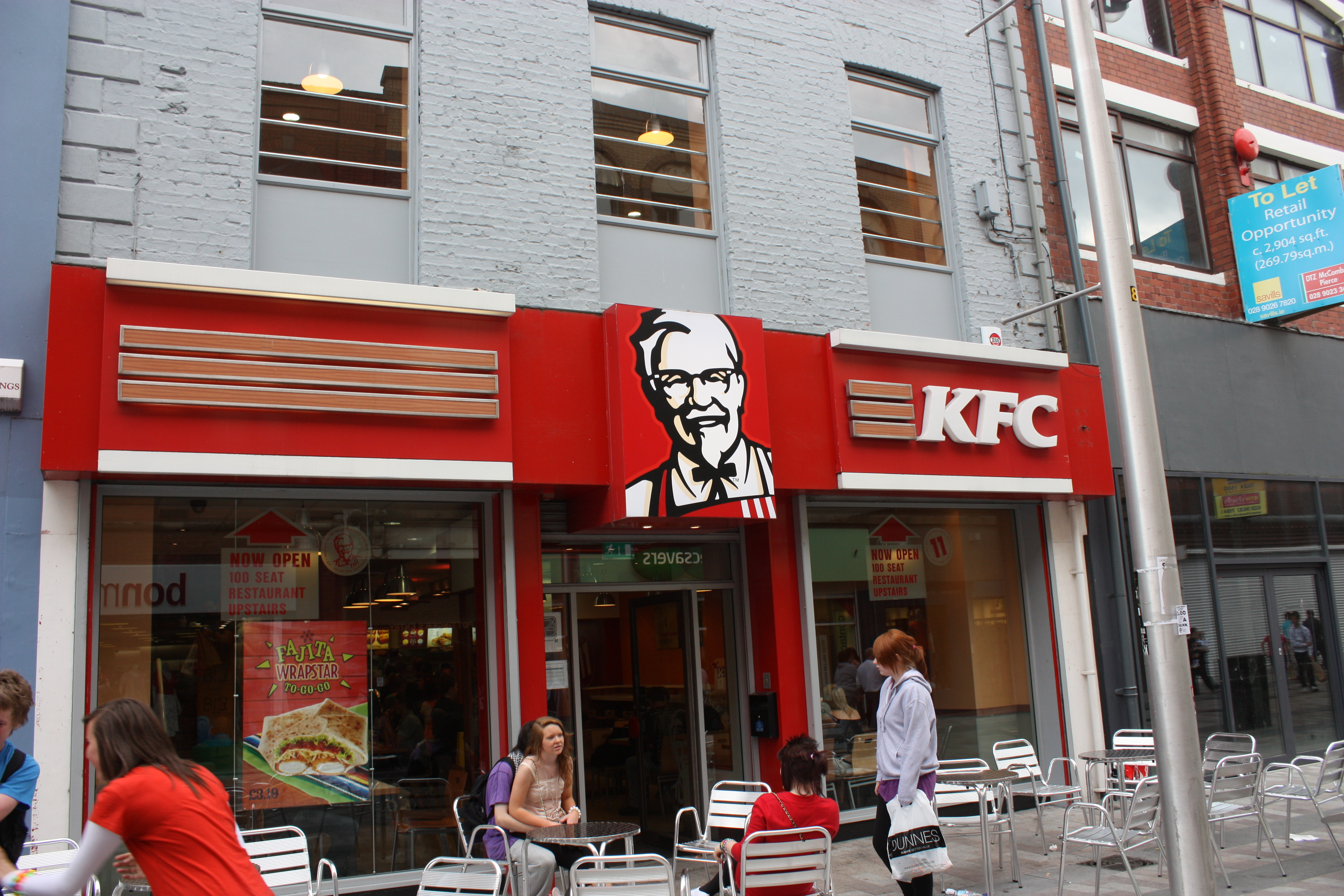
A KFC restaurant in Belfast, Northern Ireland

As of December 2013, there were 784 KFC outlets in the United Kingdom. British turnover was around £684.5 million in 2013, according to Technomic. About 70 percent of outlets are run by franchisees, with the remainder company owned. The company employs 24,000 people. Around 400 sites are drive-through outlets. Average outlet turnover is between £1 and £1.5 million.

Annual sales amount to 60,000 tonnes of chicken, 60 percent of which is purchased from the four largest suppliers in the UK, including Faccenda Group and 2 Sisters Food Group, and delivered fresh to outlets at least three times a week. The remaining 40 percent is sourced from companies in Europe, Thailand (including Charoen Pokphand Foods) and Brazil. All of the Original Recipe chicken is sourced within the UK.

England had the first overseas branch of KFC which opened in Preston, Lancashire in May 1965 and was the first American fast food restaurant chain in the country, pre-dating the arrival of McDonald's, Burger King and Pizza Hut by almost a decade. Ray Allen, an experienced Lancashire caterer, was the first franchisee. The first London branch opened in North Finchley in November 1968. In 1971 there were 31 outlets; by 1975 the chain had grown to 250 outlets. In the late 1970s and throughout the 1980s, KFCs began to introduce seating. KFC opened its first drive-through restaurant in the UK in 1984. By 1987 the company had almost 400 outlets.

In May 1997, the "Tower Burger", a fried chicken fillet sandwich with the addition of a hash brown, was first launched in the United Kingdom. In 2006, the company stopped pre-salting its fries and removed trans fats from its products. In 2012 palm oil was replaced by rapeseed oil in the fryers. Between 2004 and 2014, KFC UK increased its offering of "portable" foods: sandwiches, wraps and salads. During that period, sales rose from around £500 million to almost £1 billion. In 2012, KFC UK invested £9 million to install ovens in all of its outlets so that it could offer griddled chicken. In 2013, KFC rolled out Lavazza coffee across all of its UK outlets. In February 2018, KFC had to temporarily close 575 of its UK outlets and restrict menus and opening hours in other branches as a result of its newly contracted distributor, DHL, failing to deliver chicken to the outlets. As of February 2019, KFC in the UK has around 110 restaurants that are Halal approved out of more than 900 units. In March 2020, the restaurant announced that it would be closing all its stores temporarily in response to lockdown measures during the COVID-19 outbreak. On April 15, 2020, the store announced it would be reopening some stores for delivery services as well as donating free meals to the NHS.

=== Finland ===
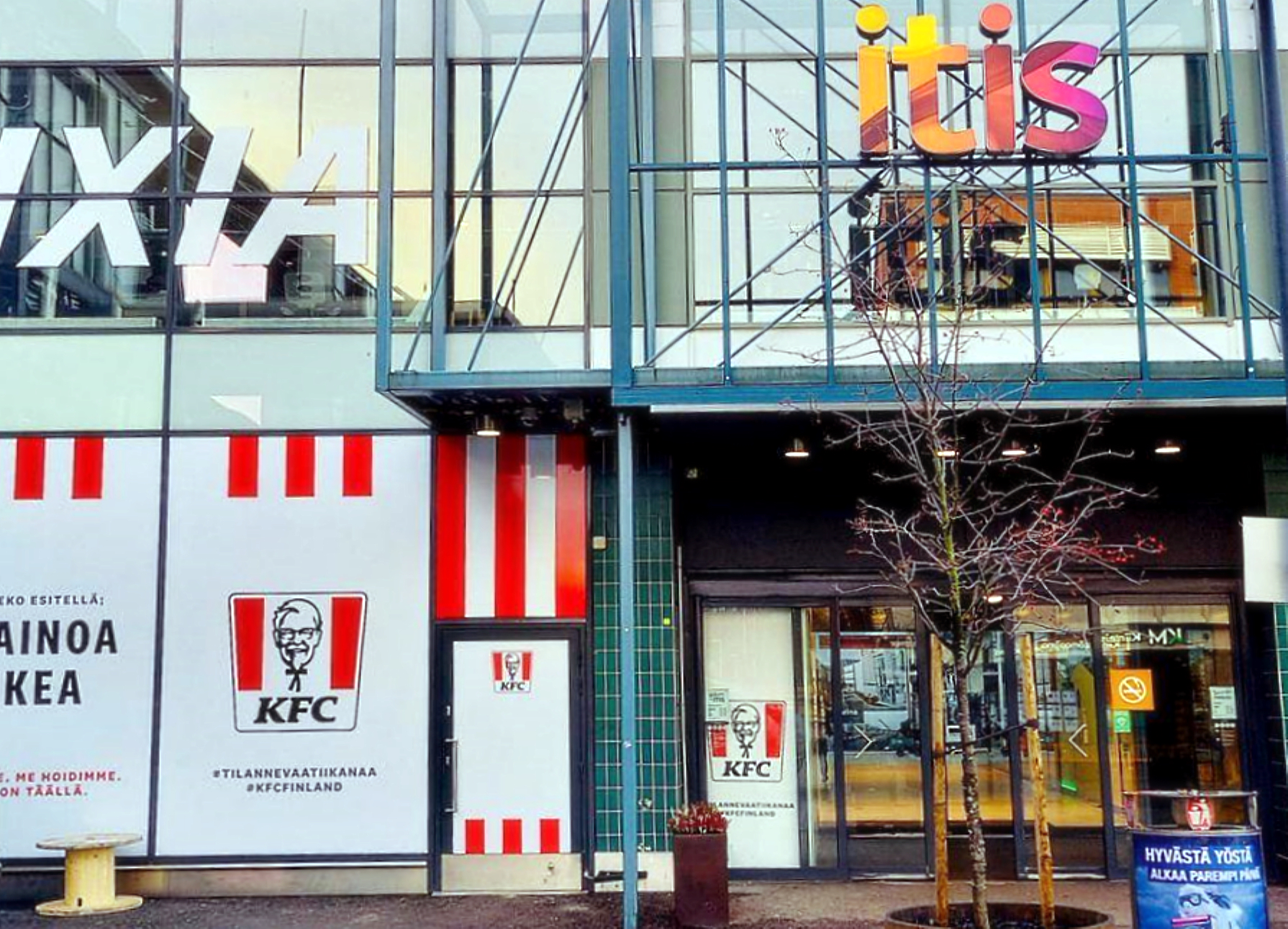
Finland's first KFC restaurant viewed from the Tallinnanaukio square at the Itis shopping centre in Itäkeskus, Helsinki, Finland

KFC originally planned on opening up to 50 franchise restaurants in Finland in 2019. In 2021 it became official that KFC will open its first restaurants in Finland 2021 despite COVID-19. The CEO of KFC Finland CEO will be Janne Einola. The restaurants will be operated by Apollo Group, which already operates the KFC restaurants in Baltic states.

On 11 November 2021, Finland's first KFC restaurant was finally opened at the Itis shopping center in Itäkeskus, Helsinki. A few days before the opening day, a tent had appeared in front of the restaurant, where a man who had kept his identity secret for a few days had stayed, and who on the opening day revealed himself to the public as a vegan activist defending animal rights. After trying to give his speech to those present, the security company carried him away. In an interview before the opening and the revelation of the animal rights campaign, the man gave a statement "Kanoista tykkään. Kuka muu olisi niin hullu, että olisi täällä näin pitkään?" ("I like chickens. Who else would be crazy enough to be here for so long?"). On November 18, it was reported that there would be about two hour-long queues at Itis' KFC restaurant even a week after the opening, which would extend as far as the entrance to the mall.

KFC is planning on opening three more restaurants in Finland, two in Espoo (in the Sello and Iso Omena shopping centres) and one in central Turku.

== North America ==
=== Canada ===
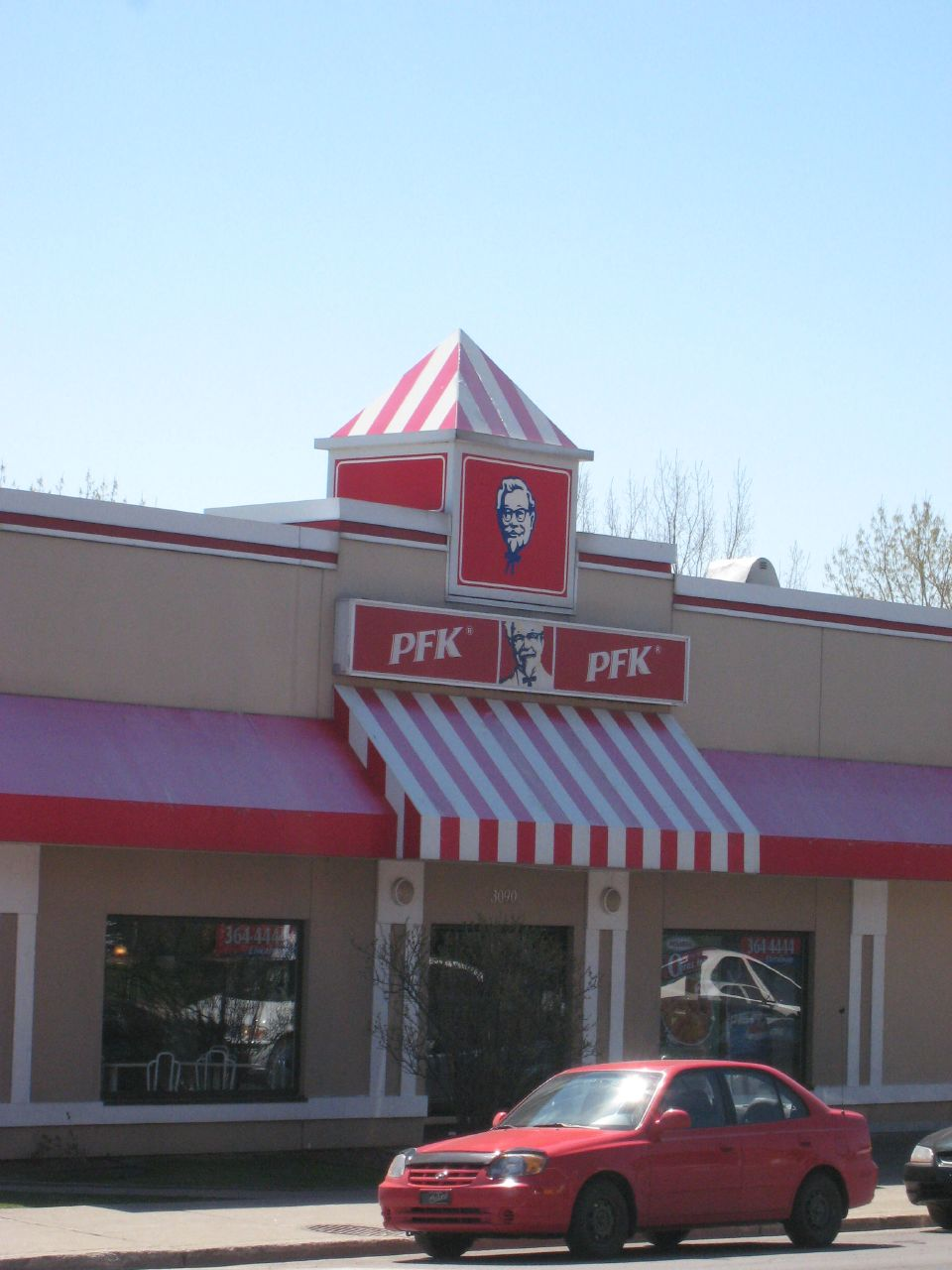
Restaurant branded "PFK" in Montreal, Quebec

The first KFC opened in 1955; 71 years ago in Saskatoon, Canada. In 1957, Colonel Harland Sanders gave an interview to CBC Radio (Note: For the audio recording taped in an interview made in Edmonton, see this link.) detailing his experience with Canadian food that led to the opening of one of his restaurants in Canada.

In the 1970s, Alberta-based Burger King (not to be confused with the US company), had a local franchise rights in Edmonton. However, as the market became more competitive, the relationship between the two companies deteriorated, with KFC attempting legal action to end the partnership. The matter was ultimately resolved in 1990 when KFC, then under the ownership of PepsiCo, refused to extend the franchise and Jarvis and Rae instead sold their remaining dual-branded restaurants to them.

In Quebec, KFC is known as "PFK" (derived from Poulet Frit Kentucky), due to provisions of the provincial government's Charter of the French Language that restrict use of English on signs and in business names. However, KFC had voluntarily changed their name to PFK mainly to avoid confusion when Kentucky Fried Chicken was renamed KFC as the restaurant has always been known as Poulet Frit Kentucky in the province.

=== Guantanamo Bay Naval Base ===
The United States naval base at Guantanamo has one KFC restaurant.

=== Mexico ===
KFC was the first fast food restaurant opened in Mexico, in 1963 in Monterrey, Nuevo León. By 2017, there were 341 outlets in the country.

=== Costa Rica ===
KFC opened in Costa Rica, in 1970 in the capital city of San Jose. By 2025 it has 67 restaurants in the country.

=== United States ===
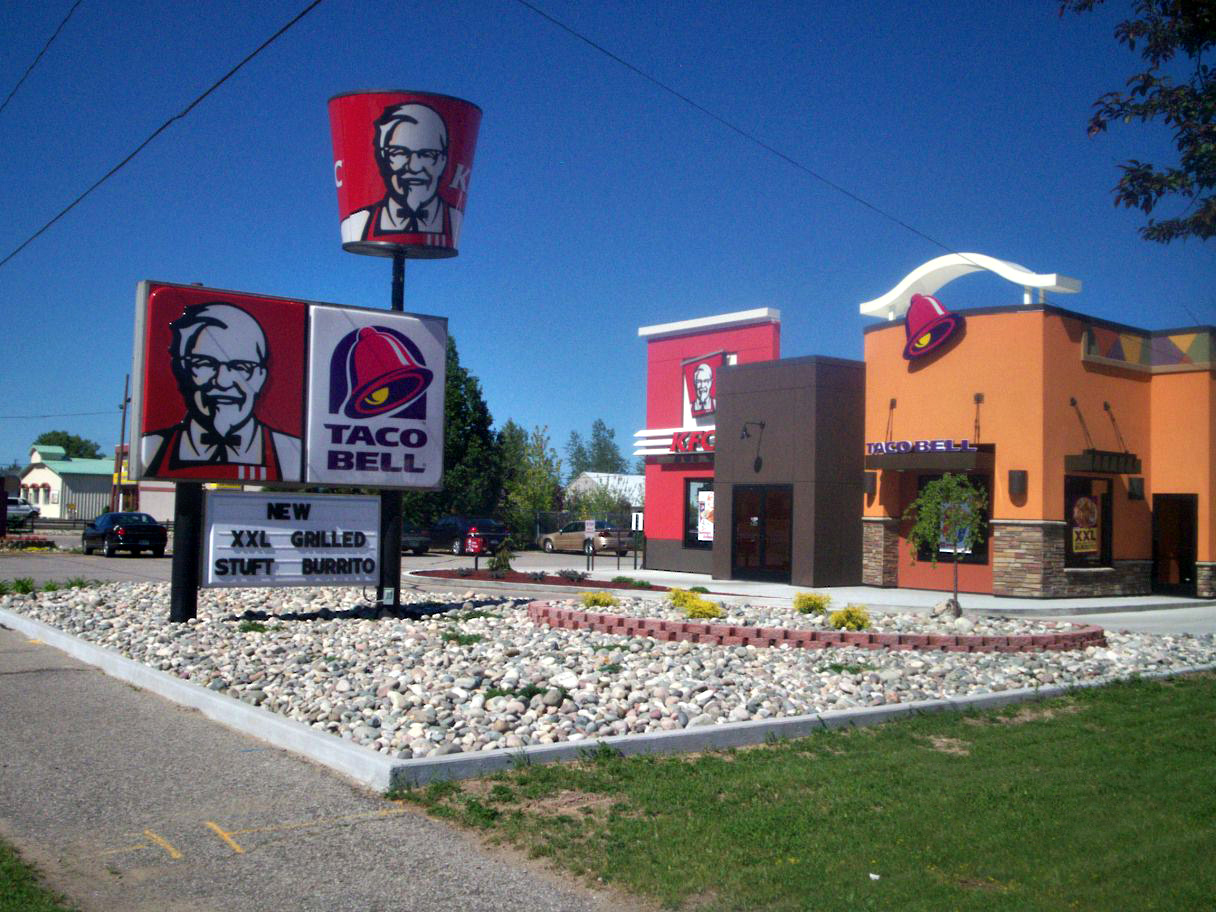
A co-branded KFC-Taco Bell in Oscoda, Michigan

KFC sales in the United States in 2013 were estimated at $4.22 billion by Technomic.

The basic model for KFC in the United States, not necessarily duplicated elsewhere, is a focus on low prices, a limited menu (29 items on average) and an emphasis on takeout. Many KFC locations are co-located with either Taco Bell or Pizza Hut, or other Yum! restaurants. When Yum! owned Long John Silver's and A&W Restaurants, these brands were often co-branded with KFC as well. Often these locations behave like a single restaurant, offering one menu with food items from both restaurant brands. In 2003, there were 354 KFC-Taco Bell combines, offering the full KFC menu and Taco Bell items, and 13 units offering the full KFC menu and a limited number of Pizza Hut items. The concept originated in 1991, when a KFC-Taco Bell combination opened in Virginia. Some locations were also opened as three-way combinations of KFC, Taco Bell and Pizza Hut, but this failed to catch on and Yum! CEO David Novak blamed a lack of franchisee commitment for its lack of success.

Initially, Sanders and KFC used hydrogenated vegetable oil for frying, but in the 1980s the company began to switch to cheaper oils such as palm or soybean. In the 2000s it became apparent that these oils contain relatively high levels of trans fat, which increases the risk of heart disease. By April 2007, the chain had switched to trans fat-free soybean oil in all of its US outlets.

In 2008, Novak credited low US sales as being the result of a lack of new ideas and menu items. The spring 2009 launch of Kentucky Grilled Chicken only resulted in a temporary halt to the sales decline. In 2010 KFC announced a turnaround plan that included improving restaurant operations, introducing value items and providing healthier menu options. In the same year, Advertising Age noted that KFC was losing market share to its smaller chicken restaurant rival, Chick-fil-A. In 2011 Bloomberg News referred to KFC US as "an also-ran to McDonald's Corp". In 2012, Forbes magazine described how many of the KFC outlets were "aged and uninviting", and that the chain "hasn't introduced an exciting new food item in ages".

KFC was described in 2012 by Bloomberg Businessweek as a "muscular player" in developing regions, specifically Africa, China, and India while noting its falling market share in the US to rivals such as Chick-fil-A and Popeyes. Some analysts speculated that KFC would begin spinning off its ailing US operations. That year, the company began divesting control of company-owned US restaurants to franchised operations, with the intention of reducing overall company ownership from 35 percent to 5 percent.

In November 2026, Yum! Brands temporarily closed all KFC locations in Puerto Rico as the operator, Encanto Restaurants, filed for Chapter 11 bankruptcy protection.

== South America ==
The first KFC in South America opened in Bahamas in 1967. There are a total of 974 locations in all of South America.

== Oceania ==
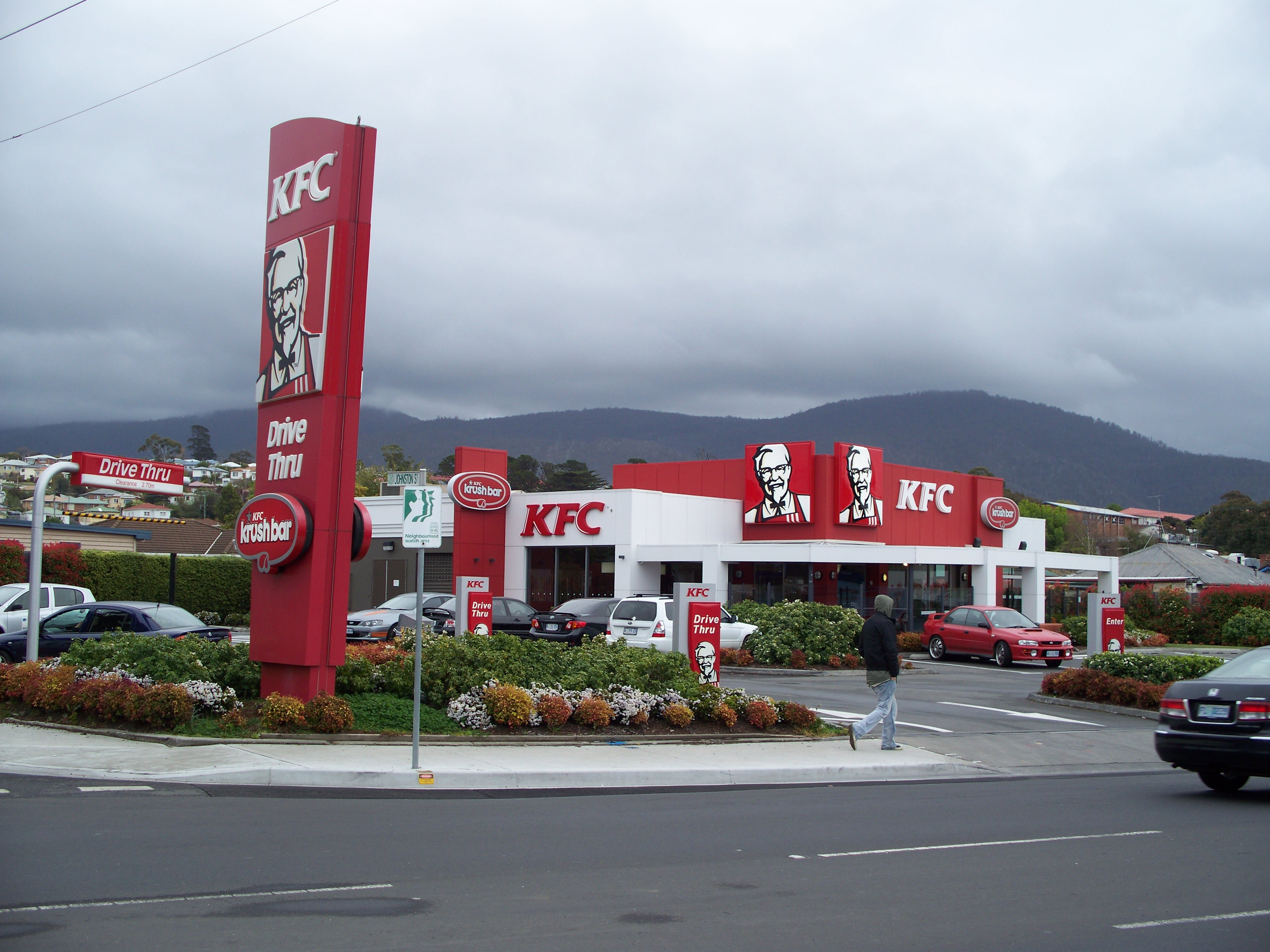
A KFC outlet in Derwent Park, a northern suburb of Hobart, Australia

There are over 800 KFC outlets in Australia, and around 100 in New Zealand. KFC was the first American style fast food chain to open in both countries. In 2013, KFC reported an annual turnover of almost 2 billion AUD for its Australia and New Zealand operations.

=== Australia ===
Yum! directly operates 160 KFC outlets in Australia. The largest of the 53 independent franchisees in Australia is Collins Foods, which operates 169 stores. KFC's major poultry suppliers in Australia are Inghams, Steggles and Turi Foods.

The first Australian KFC was opened in 1968 in Guildford, a suburb of Sydney. The franchise was owned by a Canadian entrepreneur called Bob Lapointe. Between 1970 and 1971, 75 outlets were opened. This had a major impact on Australian chicken production, which increased by 38 percent during the period. By 1995 there were 452 outlets and the company employed 12,000 staff. That year, Australia produced 35 percent of KFC's international earnings.

=== New Zealand ===
The first KFC opened in New Zealand in 1971 at Royal Oak, a suburb of Auckland. By September 1973, KFC had opened nine outlets in New Zealand – four in Auckland, and one each in Hamilton, Rotorua, Wellington, Christchurch and Dunedin. By 1980, there were 37 outlets. In 1989, PepsiCo acquired the 50 percent stake in KFC New Zealand that it did not already own from the local Goodman Fielder conglomerate. In 1991, New Zealand turnover topped 100 million NZD for the first time.
