= KFC Israel =

Israeli fast food chain

KFC Israel (קנטאקי פרייד צ'יקן)
- Industry: Fast-food restaurant
- Founded: Israel (1993)
- Headquarters: Israel
- Number of locations: 20 (2024)
- Area served: Israel
- Products: Fried chicken
- Parent: KFC
- Website: www.kfc.co.il

KFC Israel (Hebrew: קנטאקי פרייד צ'יקן) is the Israeli franchise of KFC, which opened its first branch in Israel in the 1980s. The chain closed its last location in 2012. In February 2020, the chain re-entered the country. Currently there are 20 branches located in Netanya, Rishon LeZion, Ra'anana, Haifa, Rosh Pina, Nof HaGalil, Yarka, Be'er Sheba, Ramla, Ashdod, Tiberias, Zikhron Ya'akov, Kiryat Bialik, Petah Tikva, Emek HaYarden, Tel Aviv, Kiryat Ekron, and Kfar Saba. The company has plans to open more locations across the country.

== History ==
In the 1980s, KFC made their first attempt to enter Israel, however it failed and did not last long.

On 13 October 1993, KFC announced their intention of reopening in Israel. Their first location would open two weeks later in Rishon LeZion. KFC in Israel was originally franchised by Clal Trading Limited, who also held the Pizza Hut Israel franchise.

In 2002, Dor Energy purchased the rights to the KFC Israel franchises and elected to close 4 of the chain's 6 locations, however they began expanding again and by 2009 they had 10 locations. By 2012 all locations had closed.

During the summer 2018, KFC announced interest in reopening franchises in Israel, and sent a delegation to meet with potential franchisees, stating that they have strong confidence in the Israeli market, especially the Anglo community. This would mark KFC's fourth attempt at entering the Israeli market. KFC announced their hopes at opening 100 branches in Israel. In February 2019, KFC began hiring for their re-opening in Israel. The first branch was opened one year later in the city of Nazareth on 3 February 2020.

With Israelis preferring healthier and more local food choices, the number of branches is reducing: from 20 in 2024, to 16 in 2025, and 12 in 2026.

== Kashrut ==
In 2009 KFC Israel received permission, after two years of requesting, to replace their milk-based coating with a soy-based coating. By making this substitution KFC was able to make their locations in Israel kosher, even though the kosher branches already had non-dairy coating. Two out of the eight locations at the time were already kosher locations; however, the soy coating was utilized at all locations. KFC Israel stated at the time that the new coating tasted identical to the old one; however, the former owner later claimed that becoming kosher had been the main reason for the chain's failure.

== See also ==
- Culture of Israel
- Israeli cuisine
- Economy of Israel
- List of restaurants in Israel
