= Jubilant FoodWorks =

Indian restaurant company

Jubilant FoodWorks Limited
- Formerly: Domino's Pizza India Private Ltd
- Type: Public
- Traded as: BSE: 533155; NSE: JUBLFOOD
- ISIN: INE797F01012
- Industry: Restaurants; Food and Beverage
- Founded: 16 March 1995; 31 years ago
- Headquarters: Noida, Uttar Pradesh, India
- Number of locations: 3,663 outlets (2024)
- Areas served: India, Turkey, Bangladesh, Sri Lanka, Azerbaijan, Georgia
- Key people: Shyam Sunder Bhartia (Chairman); Sameer Khetarpal (MD & CEO)
- Brands: Domino's Pizza; Popeyes; Dunkin'; Hong's Kitchen; COFFY
- Services: Master franchisee
- Revenue: ₹9,544 crore (US$1.0 billion) (FY26)
- Operating income: ▼₹308 crore (US$32 million) (FY25)
- Net income: ▼₹217 crore (US$23 million) (FY25)
- Total assets: ▲₹8,527 crore (US$890 million) (2025)
- Total equity: ▼₹2,182 crore (US$230 million) (2025)
- Number of employees: 34,120 (2024)
- Parent: Jubilant Bhartia Group
- Subsidiaries: Jubilant FoodWorks Lanka; Jubilant Golden Harvest; DP Eurasia NV (49.04%)
- Website: www.jubilantfoodworks.com

Jubilant FoodWorks Limited is an Indian food service company based in Noida, which holds the master franchise for Domino's Pizza in India, Nepal, Sri Lanka and Bangladesh, for Popeyes in India, Bangladesh, Nepal, and Bhutan, and also for Dunkin' Donuts in India. The company also operates two homegrown restaurant brands called Ekdum! and Hong's Kitchen. Jubilant FoodWorks is a part of the Jubilant Bhartia Group, owned by Shyam Sunder Bhartia (husband of Shobhana Bhartia) and Hari Bhartia.

== History ==
On the recommendation of a friend who owned other foreign pizza licences, Shyam Sunder Bhartia and Hari Bhartia of the Jubilant Bhartia Group entered into a master franchise partnership with Domino's Pizza. Domino's Pizza India Private Ltd. was incorporated on 16 March 1995, and began operations in 1996. The company opened India's first Domino's Pizza outlet in New Delhi in 1996. The company changed its name to Jubilant FoodWorks Ltd in 2009. It was headed by Ajay Kaul since 2005. Pratik Rashmikant Pota became the CEO from April 2017. Pota announced his resignation in March 2022 and stepped down in June.

On 24 February 2011, Jubilant FoodWorks signed a master franchise agreement with American coffeehouse chain Dunkin' Donuts to operate the brand in India. Jubilant FoodWorks opened India's first Dunkin' Donuts outlet in Connaught Place, New Delhi in April 2012.

The company launched its first homegrown brand called Hong's Kitchen, offering fast casual Chinese dining, with the first restaurant opening at Eros Mall in Gurugram on 13 March 2019. On 24 March 2021, Jubilant FoodWorks entered into a master franchise and development agreement with Restaurant Brands International to operate Popeyes restaurants in India, Bangladesh, Nepal and Bhutan. The company opened India's first Popeyes outlet at Koramangala, Bangalore on 20 January 2022.

Jubilant FoodWorks suffered a security breach in April 2021 and hackers reportedly obtained 13 terabytes of data including 180 million order details, customer names, phone numbers, email IDs, addresses, payment details, and at least 1 million credit cards.

=== Acquisitions ===
On 1 January 2021, Jubilant FoodWorks purchased a 10.76% stake in Barbeque Nation for ₹92 crore (US$9.6 million). The company acquired a 35% stake in Mumbai-based food tech startup Thrive for ₹24.75 crore (US$2.6 million) in October 2021.

On 19 February 2021, the company announced that it would acquire complete ownership of Netherlands-based Fides Food Systems Coöperatief UA for £24.80 million through its subsidiary Jubilant Foodworks Netherlands BV. Fides held a 32.81% stake in DP Eurasia NV, which is the master franchisee for Dominos Pizza in Turkey, Russia, Azerbaijan and Georgia. In November 2021, Jubilant Foodworks acquired an additional 6.98% stake in DP Eurasia, taking its total stake in the company to 39.79%. Jubilant merged Fides Food Systems Coeratief UA with Jubilant Foodworks Netherlands BV on 2 March 2022, and stated that it now owned 41.32% of DP Eurasia NV.

== Domino's Pizza ==
=== India ===
The first Domino's Pizza in India opened in New Delhi in January 1996. India surpassed the United Kingdom to become Domino's second-largest market in December 2014, behind the United States. Domino's Pizza operates 1,995 stores across 421 Indian cities as of September 2024.

Domino's began accepting online orders in 2011, and online orders accounted for approximately 18-20% of total sales by December 2013. On 19 March 2014, the 700th Domino's Pizza outlet was opened at HUDA City Centre metro station in Sector-29, Gurugram, Haryana. The company opened 47 new restaurants between January–March 2014 and 150 outlets in the 2013–2014 financial year. Domino's opened its 1000th outlet at Unity One Mall, Janakpuri, Delhi in January 2016.

In May 2016, the Centre for Science and Environment (CSE) reported that Domino's pizza bread was laced with toxins and carcinogens such as potassium bromate and potassium iodate. Potassium bromate is a category 2B carcinogen, meaning it can cause cancer. Potassium bromate was banned in India in June 2016. In 2017, a customer in Delhi claimed to have found live bugs in Domino's Pizza seasoning sachets. A video of the same went viral. This prompted Domino's to stop giving seasoning sachets for some time. When they restarted, they changed the packing from transparent to opaque.

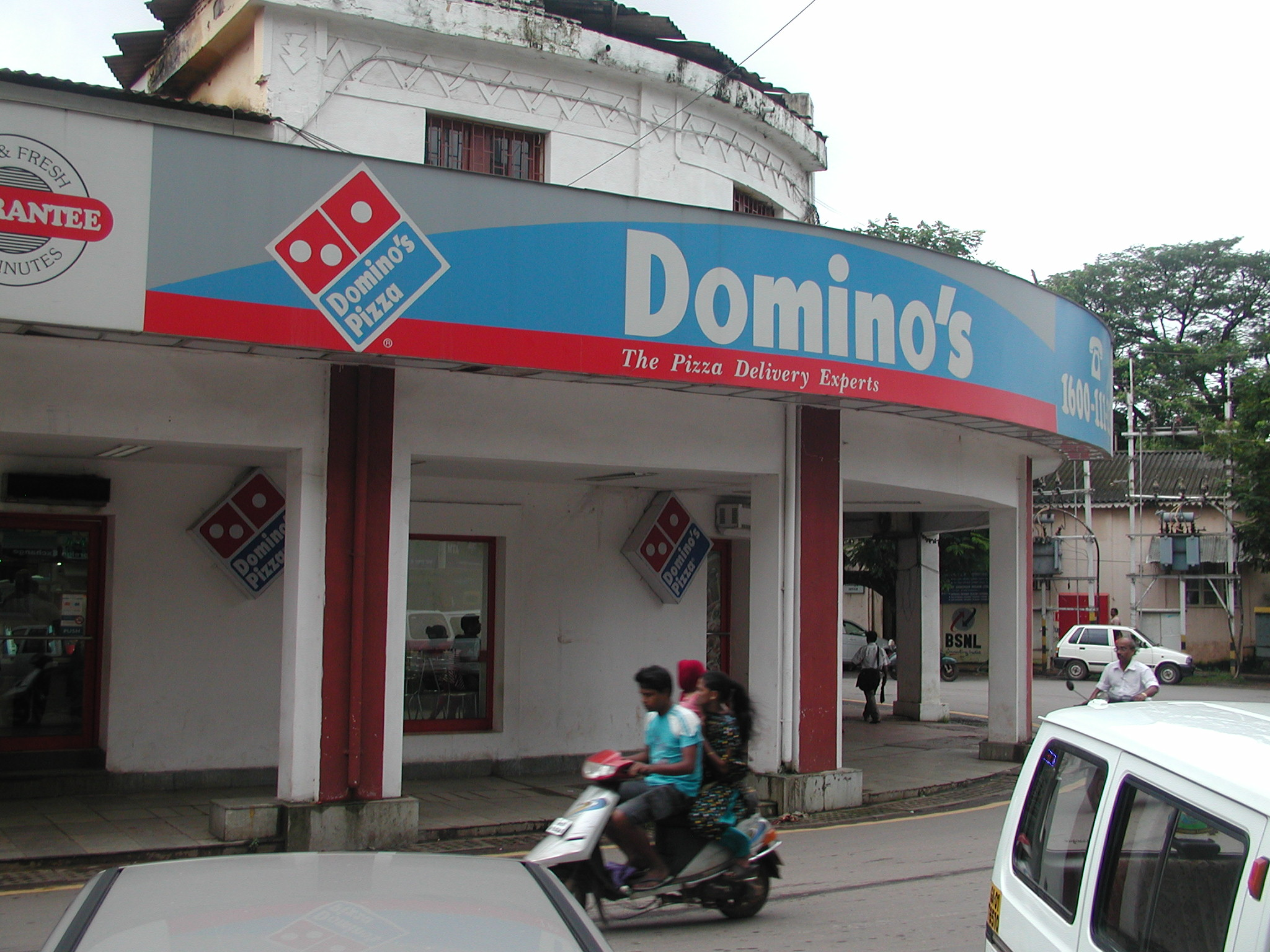
A Domino's Pizza outlet in Panaji, Goa

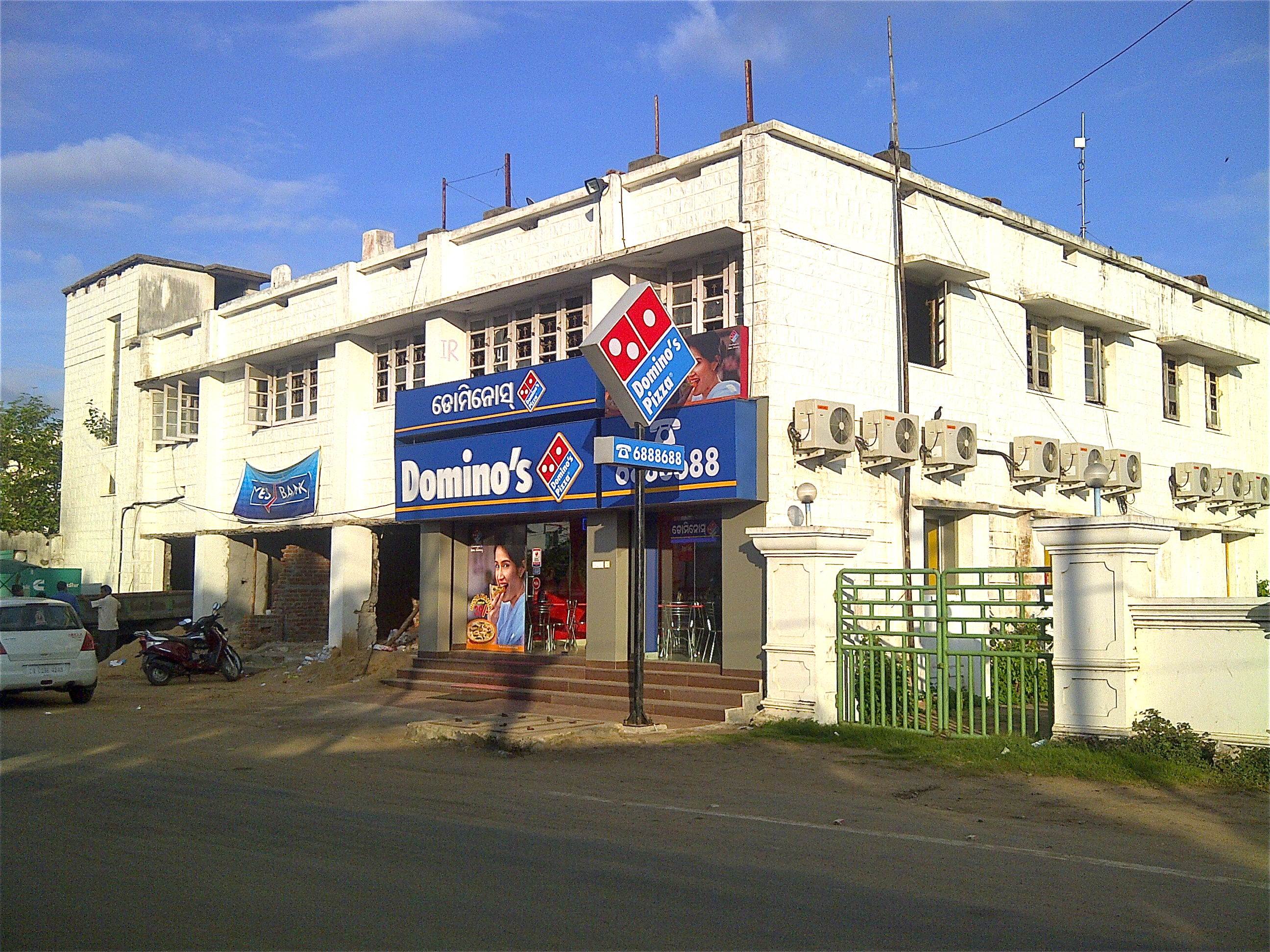
Domino's outlet in Puri, Odisha

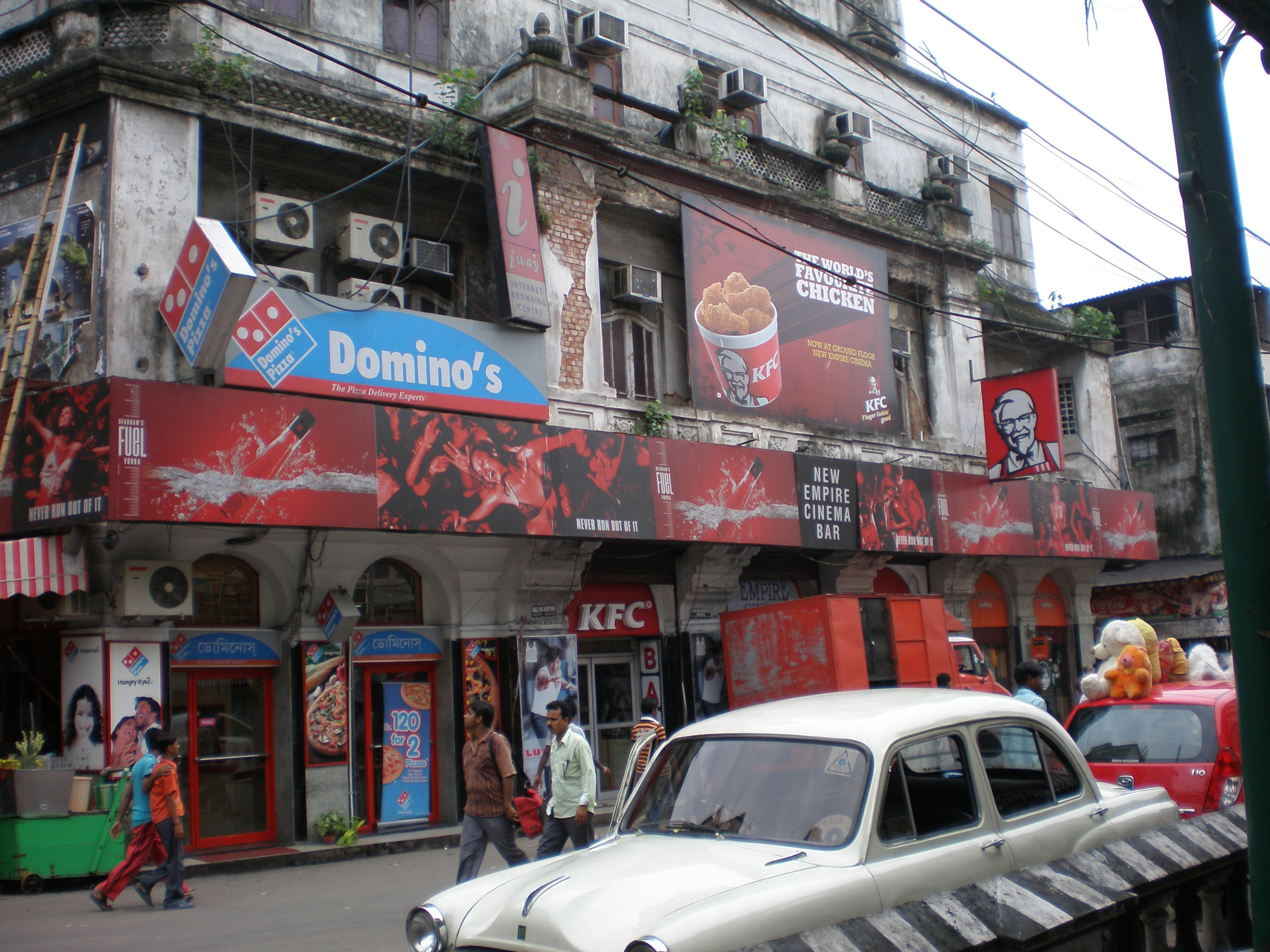
Domino's, next to a KFC, in New Market, Kolkata

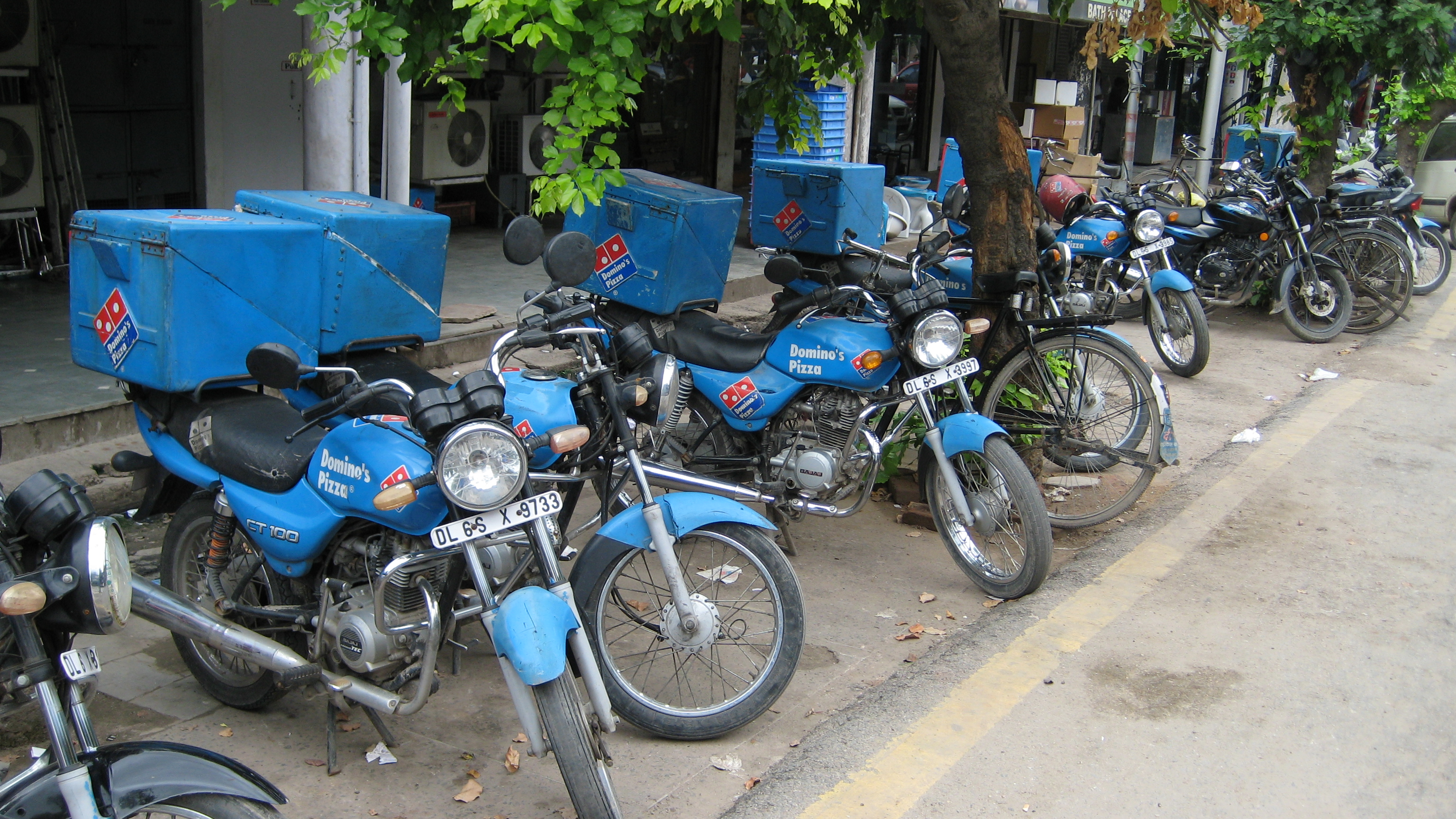
Domino's delivery motorcycles in Noida, Uttar Pradesh

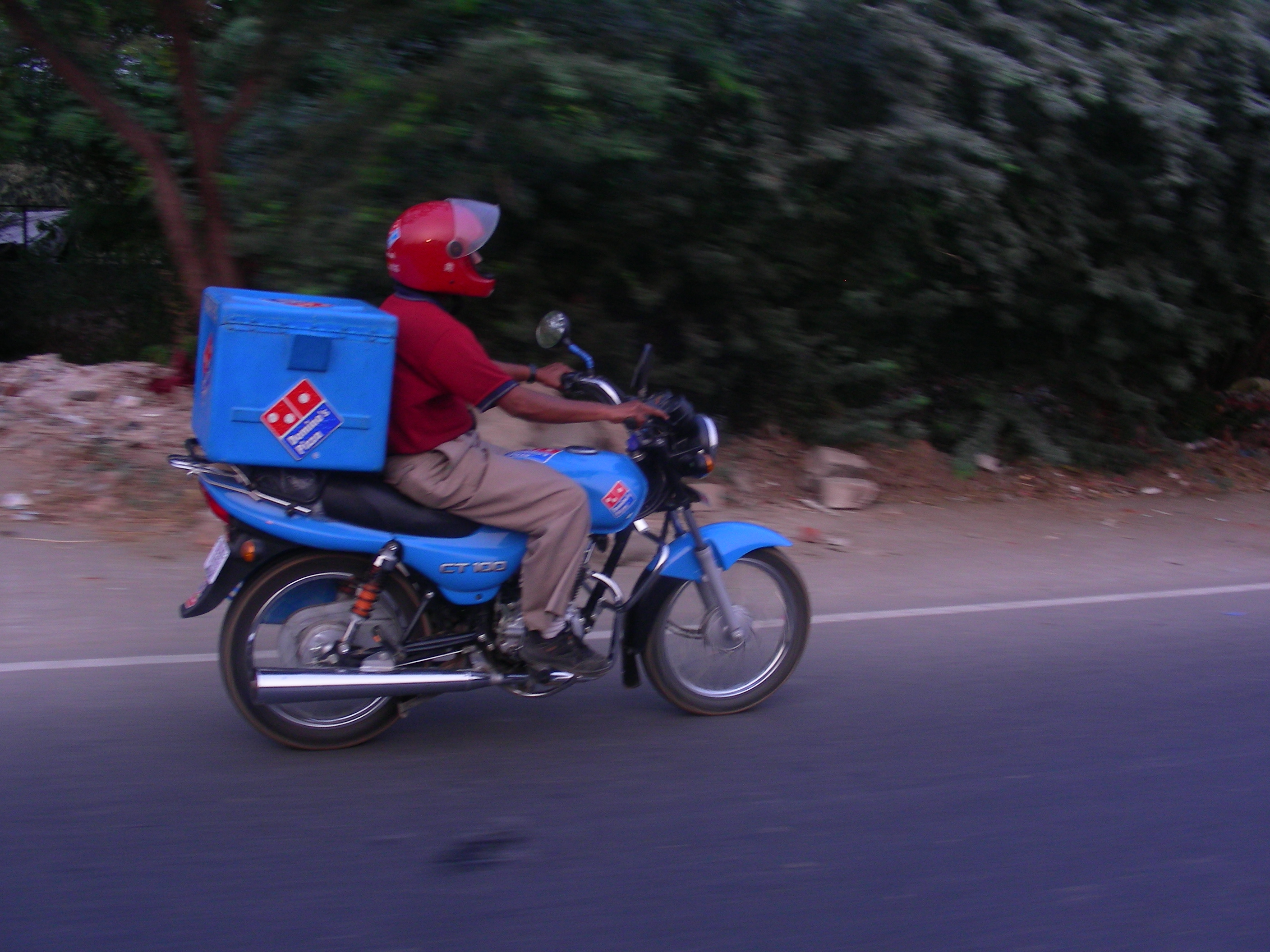
A Domino's delivery man in Delhi.

=== Bangladesh ===
Jubilant Golden Harvest Ltd., a wholly owned subsidiary of Jubilant FoodWorks, operates Domino's Pizza outlets in Bangladesh. Jubilant Golden Harvest Ltd. was established in early 2019 with Jubilant holding a 51% stake, and Bangladeshi company Golden Harvest Group holding the remaining 49%. The first Domino's Pizza outlet opened in Dhaka in February 2019. In September 2021, Jubilant FoodWorks exercised its first call option to acquire an additional 39% stake in the joint venture taking its ownership to 90%. Jubilant FoodWorks exercised its second call option to acquire the remaining 10% stake and took complete control of the joint venture in May 2022. The cost of the two call options to acquire the 49% stake was BD৳38.90 crore (US$3.2 million). One share in Jubilant Golden Harvest remains with a company nominee in order to comply with Bangladeshi regulations.

There are currently 44 Domino's Pizza outlets in Bangladesh.

=== Sri Lanka ===
Jubilant FoodWorks Lanka Pvt. Limited, a wholly owned subsidiary of Jubilant FoodWorks, operates Domino's Pizza outlets in Sri Lanka. The first Domino's outlet opened in Colombo in February 2011. There were 23 Domino's Pizza outlets in Sri Lanka as of December 2017.

== Dunkin' Donuts ==
On 24 February 2011, Jubilant FoodWorks signed a master franchise agreement with American coffeehouse chain Dunkin' Donuts to operate the brand in India. Jubilant FoodWorks opened India's first Dunkin' Donuts outlet in Connaught Place, New Delhi in April 2012. Apart from donuts, Munchkins, and coffee, the chain also serves vegetarian and non-vegetarian hot and cold food. Jubilant FoodWorks operates 21 Dunkin' Donuts outlets across 6 Indian cities as of 30 June 2023.

== Popeyes ==
On 24 March 2021, Jubilant FoodWorks entered into a master franchise and development agreement with Restaurant Brands International to operate Popeyes restaurants in India, Bangladesh, Nepal and Bhutan. The company opened India's first Popeyes outlet at Koramangala, Bangalore on 20 January 2022.

== Other brands ==
=== Hong's Kitchen ===
Jubilant FoodWorks launched its first homegrown brand called Hong's Kitchen, offering fast casual Chinese dining, with the first restaurant opening in Gurugram on 13 March 2019.

=== Ekdum! ===
Jubilant FoodWorks launched its second homegrown brand called Ekdum!, offering a variety of biryanis from across India in addition to kebabs, curries, breads, desserts and beverages. The first three Ekdum! restaurants were opened in Gurugram, Haryana in December 2020.

=== ChefBoss ===
In August 2020, Jubilant FoodWorks launched its ChefBoss, a brand of ready-to-cook sauces, gravies and pastes.
