= List of countries with McDonald's restaurants =

Countries with current and former McDonald's locations

McDonald's is one of the largest chains of fast-food restaurants in the world, with more than 40,000 outlets worldwide. The majority of McDonald's outlets are franchises.

The list of countries follows the company's own calculation and contains several non-sovereign territories. Today, (Note: As of 2024) there are over 13,000 McDonald's restaurants in the United States, over 7,700 in mainland China, and over 3,000 in Japan. Its home country and the two largest foreign markets make up more than half of McDonald's stores worldwide. In addition, there are also over 1,600 McDonald's restaurants in France, over 1,500 in Canada and the United Kingdom, almost 1,400 in Germany, over 1,200 in Brazil, over 1,000 in Australia, over 800 in the Philippines and Italy, and over 700 in India. McDonald's has also ceased operations in some countries it previously operated in.

== History of global operations ==
The first McDonald's restaurant was opened in 1940 by Dick and Mac McDonald. However, on 15 April 1955, Ray Kroc launched the first McDonald's in Des Plaines, Illinois, featuring a ten-item menu built around a 15-cent hamburger.

The company expanded outside the United States beginning in 1967, in Canada as well as the US territory of Puerto Rico. In the early 1970s, within a few short years, McDonald's expanded further overseas by opening stores in Japan, Australia, Western Europe (Netherlands, West Germany, France and Sweden) and Central America (Costa Rica, Panama and El Salvador). By this time, there were over 1,600 McDonald's restaurants.

McDonald's opened its first restaurant in South America in 1979 in Brazil as well as the first in Southeast Asia in Singapore (followed by the Philippines and Malaysia in the early 1980s). It later expanded into Eastern Europe and the communist world in 1988 (Yugoslavia and Hungary). In 1992 it opened its first restaurant in Morocco, becoming the first in Africa and the Arab World and meaning that McDonald's for the first time had operations in every inhabited continent of the world. Today, McDonald's has operated more than 40,000 restaurants worldwide.

== Notable stores ==
The largest McDonald's store in the world is the World's Largest Entertainment McDonald's in Florida. The biggest temporary McDonald's restaurant in the world was opened during the 2012 Summer Olympics in London, England, which was 3,000 square metres (32,000 sq ft) by area. The northernmost McDonald's restaurant in the world is located in Tromsø, Norway (previously held by Rovaniemi, Finland after the restaurant in Murmansk, Russia, was closed in 2022), and the southernmost in the world is located in Invercargill, New Zealand.

== Countries and territories with at least one McDonald's outlet ==
#	Country/territory	Date of first store	First outlet location	No. of operating outlets	Source and date of source	Population per outlet	Notes
1	United States	May 15, 1940; Franchise: April 15, 1955	San Bernardino, California; Des Plaines, Illinois (Franchise)	13,697	(source: Corporate McDonald's December 31, 2025)	25,483	First outlet. See McDonald's USA
2	Canada (details)	June 3, 1967	Richmond, British Columbia (Reopened June 23, 2017)	1,520	(source: Corporate McDonald's December 31, 2025)	26,624	First outlet outside the United States. See McDonald's Canada
3	Puerto Rico (territory of United States)	November 10, 1967	San Juan	94	(source: Corporate McDonald's December 31, 2025)	34,284	First McDonald's in Latin America and in the Caribbean and the first McDonald's in a Hispanophone area. See McDonald's Puerto Rico
4	(United States Virgin Islands) U.S. Virgin Islands (territory of United States)	September 5, 1970	Saint Croix	5	(source: Corporate McDonald's December 31, 2025)	16,680	
5	Costa Rica	December 8, 1970	San José, 4th street, between 1st and Central Avenue.	79	(source: Corporate McDonald's December 31, 2025)	65,504	Third country (not U.S. possession) where McDonald's opened. See McDonald's Costa Rica
6	Australia	May 30, 1971	Yagoona, New South Wales	1,076	(source: Corporate McDonald's December 31, 2025)	25,304	First outlet in Oceania, outside the Americas, and in the Southern Hemisphere. See McDonald's Australia. Locally nicknamed as Maccas.
7	Guam (territory of United States)	June 10, 1971	Dededo	6	(source: McDonald's Guam 2025)	28,364	First outlet in Micronesia. See McDonald's Guam & Saipan
8	Japan	July 21, 1971	Ginza Mitsukoshi, Ginza, Chuo City, Tokyo	3,025	(source: Corporate McDonald's December 31, 2025)	40,472	First outlet in Asia, McDonald's Holdings Company Japan, Inc. locally known as makku (マック) and makudo. See McDonald's Japan
9	Netherlands	August 21, 1971	Zaandam	266	(source: Corporate McDonald's December 31, 2025)	69,356	This was the first outlet in Europe. Opened in 1971 by European Master Franchisees Jan Sybesma McDonald's Europe – Plan to open 15 more stores in the next 4 years. See McDonald's Netherlands
10	Panama	September 1, 1971	Panama City	84	(source: Corporate McDonald's December 31, 2025)	55,068	See McDonald's Panama
11	Germany	November 22, 1971 (West Germany); March 1, 1983 (West Berlin); December 21, 1990 (former East Germany)	Munich (West Germany); Plauen (former East Germany)	1,382	(source: Corporate McDonald's December 31, 2025)	60,524	First outlet in West Germany opened in Munich-Obergiesing in 1971. McDonald's is locally known as Mäkkes. First outlet in the new states of Germany opened in Plauen in 1990 following reunification. See McDonald's Germany
12	France (details)	June 30, 1972	Créteil	1,629 (Note: Excluding overseas departments)	(source: Corporate McDonald's December 31, 2025)	40,974	First outlet in Créteil in 1972 even though McDonald's officially recognizes the first outlet in Strasbourg in 1979. In 2019, France was the largest European market for the hamburger chain. See McDonald's France.
13	El Salvador	July 20, 1972	San Salvador	28	(source: Corporate McDonald's December 31, 2025)	228,259	
14	Sweden	October 27, 1973	Kungsgatan 4, Stockholm	205	(source: Corporate McDonald's December 31, 2025)	52,200	First outlet in Scandinavia. See McDonald's Sweden
15	Guatemala	June 6, 1974	Guatemala City	124	(source: Corporate McDonald's December 31, 2025)	152,968	See McDonald's Guatemala
16	Curaçao (part of Netherlands Antilles at the time)	August 16, 1974	Willemstad	5	(source: Corporate McDonald's December 31, 2025)	37,088	
17	United Kingdom	England: November 13, 1974; Wales: December 3, 1984; Scotland: November 23, 1987; Northern Ireland: October 12, 1991	Woolwich, London (England); Cardiff (Wales); Dundee (Scotland); Belfast (Northern Ireland)	1,505	(source: Corporate McDonald's December 31, 2025)	46,466	See McDonald's UK
18	Hong Kong (British Hong Kong at the time)	January 8, 1975	Paterson Street, Causeway Bay, Hong Kong Island (now closed)	266	(source: Corporate McDonald's December 31, 2025)	27,739	First outlet in a Chinese-speaking territory. Hong Kong was then a British Crown colony/Dependent Territory; McDonald's would open up a restaurant in China itself 15 years later. See McDonald's Hong Kong
19	(The Bahamas) Bahamas	August 4, 1975	Nassau	3	(source: Corporate McDonald's December 31, 2025)	134,876	First outlet in an independent country of the Caribbean. See McDonald's Bahamas
20	New Zealand (details)	June 7, 1976	Porirua Central, Wellington	176	(source: Corporate McDonald's December 31, 2025)	30,042	Founded in New Zealand by Wally and Hugh Morris; First South Island restaurants opened at Linwood and Merivale, both Christchurch, on November 3, 1987. See McDonald's New Zealand.
21	Switzerland	October 20, 1976	Geneva	188	(source: Corporate McDonald's December 31, 2025)	47,914	First outlet in a landlocked country. See McDonald's Switzerland
22	(Republic of Ireland) Ireland	May 9, 1977	Grafton Street, Dublin	95	(source: Corporate McDonald's December 31, 2025)	56,389	First drive-thru in Europe opened in Nutgrove, Dublin and first McCafé in Europe Grafton Street, Dublin. See McDonald's Ireland
23	Austria	July 21, 1977	Schwarzenbergplatz, Vienna	212	(source: Corporate McDonald's December 31, 2025)	42,959	See McDonald's Austria
24	Belgium	March 21, 1978	Brussels	128	(source: Corporate McDonald's December 31, 2025)	91,989	See McDonald's Belgium
25	Brazil	February 13, 1979	Copacabana, Rio de Janeiro	1,230	(source: Corporate McDonald's December 31, 2025)	173,628	First outlet opened in Copacabana, Rio de Janeiro, in 1979. First outlet opened in South America and first outlet in a lusophone country. Locally known as Méqui.
26	Singapore	October 20, 1979	Liat Towers, Orchard Road	153	(source: Corporate McDonald's December 31, 2025)	38,600	First outlet in Southeast Asia at Liat Towers. See McDonald's Singapore
27	Spain	March 10, 1981	Gran Vía, Madrid	659	(source: Corporate McDonald's December 31, 2025)	72,611	First outlet in the Iberian Peninsula. See McDonald's Spain
28	Denmark	April 15, 1981	Vesterbrogade 2D, Copenhagen	121	(source: Corporate McDonald's December 31, 2025)	49,781	See McDonald's Denmark
29	Philippines (details)	September 27, 1981	Nicanor Reyes Street (Morayta), Sampaloc, Manila	851	(source: Corporate McDonald's December 31, 2025)	138,337	Licensed to Alliance Global Group. See McDonald's Philippines.
30	Malaysia	April 29, 1982	Jalan Bukit Bintang, Kuala Lumpur	372	(source: Corporate McDonald's December 31, 2025)	97,809	First outlet in a Muslim-majority country. See McDonald's Malaysia
31	Norway	November 18, 1983	Nedre Slottsgate, Oslo	101	(source: Corporate McDonald's December 31, 2025)	55,810	The world's northernmost branch is located in Tromsø. See McDonald's Norway
32	Taiwan	January 28, 1984	Minsheng East Road, Taipei	430	(source: Corporate McDonald's December 31, 2025)	53,515	All restaurants were temporarily closed in 1992 during investigations of restaurant bombings in Taiwan; they reopened after investigations had concluded. See McDonald's Taiwan
33	Andorra	June 29, 1984	Andorra la Vella	5	(source: McDonald's Andorra December 27, 2024)	16,751	See McDonald's Andorra
34	Finland	December 14, 1984	Hämeenkatu 17, Tampere	90	(source: Corporate McDonald's December 31, 2025)	62,464	The branch in Rovaniemi was the world's northernmost McDonalds from 1997 to 2013 and again from 2022 to 2024. See McDonald's Finland
35	Thailand	February 23, 1985	Bangkok	242	(source: Corporate McDonald's December 31, 2025)	295,701	See McDonald's Thailand
36	Italy	March 20, 1985	Bolzano	805	(source: Corporate McDonald's December 31, 2025)	73,200	See McDonald's Italy
37	Aruba (part of Netherlands Antilles at the time)	April 4, 1985	Oranjestad	3	(source: Corporate McDonald's December 31, 2025)	36,055	See McDonald's Aruba
38	Luxembourg	July 17, 1985	Luxembourg City	11	(source: Corporate McDonald's December 31, 2025)	62,495	See McDonald's Luxembourg
39	Venezuela	August 31, 1985	El Rosal, Caracas (now closed)	79	(source: Corporate McDonald's December 31, 2025)	362,452	See McDonald's Venezuela
40	Mexico	October 29, 1985	El Pedregal, Mexico City	380	(source: Corporate McDonald's December 31, 2025)	349,994	See McDonald's Mexico
41	Cuba (Note: The United States federal government is the de facto owner of the Guantanamo Bay Naval Base, where the only McDonald's outlet in Cuba is located.)	April 24, 1986	Guantanamo Bay	1	(source: Corporate McDonald's December 31, 2025)	6,100 (Note: Approximate population of the Guantanamo Bay Naval Base)	Guantanamo Bay; open only to residents of the U.S. military base. Not accessible for Cuban citizens.
42	Turkey	October 24, 1986	Istanbul	306	(source: Corporate McDonald's December 31, 2025)	287,340	First outlet opened in East Thrace; outlets in Anatolia would open later. Also first outlet in the Turkic-speaking world, with Azerbaijan coming second at 1999. See McDonald's Turkey
43	Argentina	November 24, 1986	Belgrano, Buenos Aires	231	(source: Corporate McDonald's December 31, 2025)	199,150	See McDonald's Argentina
44	Macau (Portuguese Macau at the time)	April 11, 1987	Rua do Campo, Cathedral Parish, Macau Peninsula	41	(source: Corporate McDonald's December 31, 2025)	17,639	Then Portuguese territory; Technically first on Portuguese land, McDonald's would only open a restaurant in Portugal itself 4 years later. see List of restaurants.
45	Serbia (part of Yugoslavia at the time)	March 24, 1988	Slavija Square, Belgrade	42	(source: Corporate McDonald's December 31, 2025)	170,307	First outlet in a communist country and in the Balkans. See McDonald's Serbia
46	South Korea	March 29, 1988	Gangnam District, Seoul	401	(source: Corporate McDonald's December 31, 2025)	128,679	See McDonald's South Korea
47	Hungary	April 13, 1988	Budapest	129	(source: Corporate McDonald's December 31, 2025)	77,933	First outlet in a Warsaw Pact country, thus first outlet behind the Iron Curtain. Locally known as Meki. See McDonald's Hungary
48	China	October 8, 1990	Dongmen, Luohu District, Shenzhen	7,740	(source: Corporate McDonald's December 31, 2025)	182,547	The most in a market besides the US. See McDonald's China
49	Chile	November 19, 1990	Las Condes, Santiago	125	(source: Corporate McDonald's December 31, 2025)	159,567	See McDonald's Chile
50	Indonesia	February 23, 1991	Sarinah, Jakarta (now closed)	314	(source: Corporate McDonald's December 31, 2025)	916,837	In 2008, McDonald's franchise license were transferred to Rekso Group. First branch in Sarinah closed in 2020 due to refurbishment of Sarinah itself, the outlet would move 3 years later to the adjacent Jaya Building. See McDonald's Indonesia
51	Portugal	May 23, 1991	CascaiShopping, Cascais	220	(source: Corporate McDonald's December 31, 2025)	47,252	See McDonald's Portugal
52	Greece	November 12, 1991	Athens Syntagma Square	34	(source: Corporate McDonald's December 31, 2025)	291,092	See McDonald's Greece
53	Uruguay	November 18, 1991	Montevideo Shopping, Montevideo	35	(source: Corporate McDonald's December 31, 2025)	96,644	See McDonald's Uruguay
54	Martinique (part of France)	December 16, 1991	Fort-de-France	10	(source: Corporate McDonald's December 31, 2025)	33,771	See McDonald's French Antilles
55	Czech Republic (part of Czechoslovakia at the time)	March 20, 1992	Vodičkova street, Prague	140	(source: Corporate McDonald's December 31, 2025)	75,198	First McDonald's outlet to open after the Cold War. See McDonald's Czech Republic
56	Guadeloupe (part of France)	April 8, 1992	Centre de Leyton Square Area, Capesterre-Belle-Eau	9	(source: Corporate McDonald's December 31, 2025)	41,384	See McDonald's French Antilles
57	Poland	June 17, 1992	Marszałkowska Street, Warsaw in department store "Sezam" (now closed)	618	(source: Corporate McDonald's December 31, 2025)	61,235	See McDonald's Poland
58	Monaco	November 20, 1992	Monte Carlo	1	(source: McDonald's France September 2023)	38,087	
59	Brunei	December 13, 1992	Mission Hill Road, Bandar Seri Begawan	7	(source: Corporate McDonald's December 31, 2025)	67,111	See McDonald's Brunei
60	Morocco	December 18, 1992	Casablanca	79	(source: Corporate McDonald's December 31, 2025)	490,664	First outlet in Africa and the first outlet in the Arab World; McDonald's is now present in all continents except Antarctica. See McDonald's Morocco
61	Northern Mariana Islands (territory of United States)	March 18, 1993	Saipan	2	(source:McDonald's US 2024)	21,457	First outlet opened on the island of Saipan; second outlet opened in 1997
62	Israel (details)	October 14, 1993	Ayalon Mall, Ramat Gan	235	(source: Corporate McDonald's December 31, 2025)	41,054	First outlet in the Middle East. See McDonald's Israel.
63	Slovenia	December 2, 1993	Čopova Street, Ljubljana	29	(source: Corporate McDonald's December 31, 2025)	72,916	See McDonald's Slovenia
64	Saudi Arabia	December 8, 1993	Riyadh	458	(source: Corporate McDonald's December 31, 2025)	76,781	Home to the most McDonald's in the Middle East. First outlet in the Arabian Peninsula. See McDonalds's Central, Eastern and Northern. See McDonald's Western and Southern
65	Kuwait	June 15, 1994	Kuwait City (now closed)	89	(source: Corporate McDonald's December 31, 2025)	57,335	Home to the biggest McDonald's in the Middle East. See McDonald's Kuwait The first McDonald's in Kuwait closed after 25 years of service due to an expired contract between McDonald's and the Touristic Enterprises Company See McDonald's Kuwait
66	New Caledonia (territory of France)	July 26, 1994	Nouméa	4	(source: McDonald's New Caledonia 2025)	74,473	See McDonald's New Caledonia
67	Oman	July 30, 1994	Salalah	35	(source: Corporate McDonald's December 31, 2025)	162,042	See McDonald's Oman
68	Egypt	October 20, 1994	Cairo	194	(source: Corporate McDonald's December 31, 2025)	619,078	See McDonald's Egypt
69	Bulgaria	December 10, 1994	Plovdiv	47	(source: Corporate McDonald's December 31, 2025)	141,865	See McDonald's Bulgaria
70	Bahrain	December 15, 1994	Manama	32	(source: Corporate McDonald's December 31, 2025)	52,362	See McDonald's Bahrain
71	Latvia	December 15, 1994	Riga	15	(source: Corporate McDonald's August 20, 2026)	122,815	First outlet in the Post-Soviet area after Russia. See McDonald's Latvia
72	United Arab Emirates	December 21, 1994 (Dubai); June 10, 1995 (Abu Dhabi)	Dubai (1994); Abu Dhabi (1995)	222	(source: Corporate McDonald's December 31, 2025)	52,138	See McDonald's UAE
73	Estonia	April 29, 1995	Tallinn	11	(source: Corporate McDonald's December 31, 2025)	121,006	See McDonald's Estonia
74	Romania	June 16, 1995	Unirii Square, Bucharest	114	(source: Corporate McDonald's December 31, 2025)	164,918	See McDonald's Romania
75	Malta	July 7, 1995	Valletta	10	(source: Corporate McDonald's December 31, 2025)	54,901	See McDonald's Malta
76	Colombia	July 14, 1995	Centro Andino, Bogotá	73	(source: Corporate McDonald's December 31, 2025)	738,852	See McDonald's Colombia
77	Slovakia	October 14, 1995	Banská Bystrica	54	(source: Corporate McDonald's December 31, 2025)	100,951	See McDonald's Slovakia
78	South Africa	November 11, 1995	Durban, KwaZulu-Natal	407	(source: Corporate McDonald's December 31, 2025)	160,818	First outlet in Sub-Saharan Africa and Southern Africa. See McDonald's South Africa
79	Qatar	December 13, 1995	Doha	78	(source: Corporate McDonald's December 31, 2025)	40,687	See McDonald's Qatar
80	Honduras	December 14, 1995	Tegucigalpa	16	(source: Corporate McDonald's December 31, 2025)	699,048	See McDonald's Honduras
81	Sint Maarten (part of Netherlands Antilles at the time)	December 15, 1995	Philipsburg	2	(source: Corporate McDonald's December 31, 2025)	22,224	
82	Croatia	February 2, 1996	Zagreb	50	(source: McDonald's Croatia, November 15, 2026)	76,447	See McDonald's Croatia
83	Samoa (named Western Samoa at the time)	March 2, 1996	Apia	1	(source: Corporate McDonald's December 31, 2025)	220,528	Facebook
84	Fiji	May 1, 1996	Suva	5	(source: Corporate McDonald's December 31, 2025)	187,456	See McDonald's Fiji
85	Liechtenstein	May 3, 1996	Triesen	1	(source: 2018)	40,368	See McDonald's Switzerland
86	Lithuania	June 11, 1996	Vilnius	19	(source: Corporate McDonald's December 31, 2025)	147,228	See McDonald's Lithuania
87	India	October 13, 1996	New Delhi	757	(source: Corporate McDonald's December 31, 2025)	1,950,628	First outlet in South Asia. See McDonald's India
88	Peru	October 18, 1996	San Isidro, Lima	30	(source: Corporate McDonald's December 31, 2025)	1,164,072	See McDonald's Peru
89	Jordan	November 7, 1996	Amman	45	(source: Corporate McDonald's December 31, 2025)	257,545	See McDonald's Jordan
90	Paraguay	November 21, 1996	Asunción	30	(source: Corporate McDonald's December 31, 2025)	236,509	See McDonald's Paraguay
91	Dominican Republic	November 30, 1996	Santo Domingo	25	(source: Corporate McDonald's December 31, 2025)	464,380	Country with the second most locations of McDonald's in the Caribbean, after Puerto Rico. See McDonald's Dominican Republic
92	French Polynesia (territory of France)	December 10, 1996	Tahiti	5	(source: Corporate McDonald's December 31, 2025)	56,615	See: https://www.facebook.com/McDonalds.Tahiti
93	Trinidad and Tobago	May 6, 1997	The Falls at West Mall	4	(source: Corporate McDonald's December 31, 2025)	378,317	McDonald's previously had stores in Trinidad (May 6, 1997 – October 25, 2003) but closed due to low sales. Re-opened at The Falls at West Mall in 2011.
94	Ukraine	May 24, 1997	Near Lukianivska metro station in Kyiv	135	(source: Corporate McDonald's December 31, 2025)	292,858	All three restaurants in the peninsula of Crimea were permanently closed after the Russian military invasion in March 2014. The 2 restaurants in Donetsk and the only one in Luhansk were also permanently closed after the War in Donbas intensified in late 2014. All restaurants in Ukraine were temporarily closed down due to the Russian invasion of Ukraine in February 2022; they reopened in September that same year. The restaurant in Kherson was destroyed during the Russian occupation and the restaurant in Melitopol remains closed as the city is under Russian control since March 2022. See McDonald's Ukraine
95	Cyprus	June 12, 1997	Larnaca	23	(source: Corporate McDonald's December 31, 2025)	42,603	See McDonald's Cyprus
96	Jersey (British Crown dependency)	August 1, 1997	Saint Helier	1	?	104,540	
97	Ecuador	October 9, 1997	Centro Comercial Iñaquito (CCI), Quito	36	(source: Corporate McDonald's December 31, 2025)	512,347	See McDonald's Ecuador
98	Réunion (part of France)	December 14, 1997	Saint-Denis	18	(source: Corporate McDonald's December 31, 2025)	49,239	See McDonald's Réunion
99	Isle of Man (British Crown dependency)	December 15, 1997	Douglas	1	?	84,055	
100	Suriname	December 18, 1997	Paramaribo	2	(source: Corporate McDonald's December 31, 2025)	322,628	
101	Moldova	April 30, 1998	Chișinău	11	(source: Corporate McDonald's December 31, 2025)	269,205	See McDonald's Moldova
102	Nicaragua	July 11, 1998	Managua	10	(source: Corporate McDonald's December 31, 2025)	709,733	All McDonald's outlets in Nicaragua temporarily ceased operation during the Nicaraguan Civil War and were re-opened in 1998 after an absence of two decades. Amidst the war, however, one outlet continued operations as "Donald's". See McDonald's Nicaragua
103	Lebanon	September 18, 1998	Beirut	23	(source: Corporate McDonald's December 31, 2025)	256,412	See McDonald's Lebanon
104	Pakistan (details)	September 19, 1998	Lahore	70	(source: Corporate McDonald's December 31, 2025)	3,704,283	See McDonald's Pakistan
105	(Georgia (country)) Georgia	February 5, 1999	Rustaveli Avenue, Tbilisi	27	(source: Corporate McDonald's December 31, 2025)	140,913	First outlet in the Caucasus. See McDonald's Georgia
106	Gibraltar (territory of United Kingdom)	August 13, 1999	Westside	1	(source: 2018)	40,867	See McDonald's Spain
107	Azerbaijan	November 6, 1999	Fountains Square, Baku	34	(source: Corporate McDonald's December 31, 2025)	307,496	See McDonald's Azerbaijan
108	French Guiana (part of France)	February 22, 2000	Cayenne	3	(source: Corporate McDonald's December 31, 2025)	106,291	See McDonald's French Antilles
109	American Samoa (territory of United States)	September 29, 2000	Pago Pago	1	(source: McDonald's US 2024)	45,319	
110	Mauritius	July 4, 2001	Port Louis	18	(source: Corporate McDonald's December 31, 2025)	70,281	See McDonald's Mauritius
111	Vietnam	February 8, 2014	Ho Chi Minh City	45	(source: Corporate McDonald's December 31, 2025)	2,270,610	See McDonald's Vietnam
112	(Collectivity of Saint Martin) Saint Martin (territory of France)	December 29, 2014	Marigot	1	(source: McDonald's Saint-Martin)	31,496	
113	Western Sahara (Morocco's Southern Provinces)	August 10, 2017	Laayoune	1	(source: Publico)	610,813	

== Former locations ==
This is a list of sovereign states around the world in which McDonald's previously operated restaurants. (Note: Sources such as NY Times, LA Times and the Telegraph have claimed that McDonald's operated stores in Iran prior to 1979, but no source has provided evidence for this claim. The number of McDonald's outlets in pre-1979 Iran, or even the existence of such outlets, remains unclear.)

#	Country/territory	Date of first store	Date of closure	Reason for closure	Number of stores
1	Barbados	August 25, 1989	December 13, 1990	Closed due to extremely poor sales.	1
2	Bermuda (territory of United Kingdom)	November 10, 1985	March 9, 1995	Closed after the passage of a government law banning franchised restaurants in the territory. The McDonald's restaurant was located on a US Naval Air Station and was thus exempt from the law. When the base closed in 1995, the restaurant was required to do likewise.	1
3	Bolivia	November 21, 1997	November 30, 2002	Closed due to poor sales and high prices. McDonald's has since attempted to reenter the Bolivian market, but with no success so far.	8
4	Jamaica	April 15, 1995	October 14, 2005	Closed due to serious political issues with the government of the country and declining sales and Highest Prices.	11
5	Montenegro (part of Serbia and Montenegro at the time)	June 1, 2004	May 2007	A seasonal McDonald's restaurant was opened in Budva, but was later closed due to the lack of interest for a permanent location.	1
6	Iceland	September 9, 1993	October 31, 2009 (Halloween)	Closed due to the 2008–2011 Icelandic financial crisis. All former McDonald's restaurants were renamed locally as Metro, which served the same menu as McDonald's along with domestic products.	3
7	North Macedonia (named Republic of Macedonia at the time)	September 6, 1997	May 14, 2013	Closed due to a dispute in contract and contractual obligations with the franchise owner Sveto Janevski.	7
8	San Marino	July 6, 1999	July 6, 2019	The one and only Sammarinese McDonald's restaurant was located in Borgo Maggiore. It ceased operations on July 6, 2019, 20 years after its opening, due to its close proximity to (and ultimately insurmountable competition from) restaurants in nearby Italian communities, which resulted in a great decline in interest of sales.	1
9	Russia (details) (part of Soviet Union at the time)	January 31, 1990	May 16, 2022	First restaurant was opened in Pushkin Square, Moscow in 1990. It was the first outlet in the Soviet Union itself, which then dissolved in December 1991 after its opening. In March 2022, McDonald's suspended all operations in Russia due to the Russian invasion of Ukraine and the Russo-Ukrainian War. McDonald's later chose to permanently shut down all McDonald's operations in Russia, citing geopolitical concern. Before its closure, McDonald's had opened 850 restaurants in Russia. The brand was technically relaunched in the country on June 12, 2022, as Vkusno i tochka (Вкусно и точка, "Tasty, period") by local franchisee Alexander Govor, who acquired the operations in May from McDonald's. While the menu and equipment remains the same, most of the trademarks were dropped. It is expected that McDonald's will have an option to reacquire the 850 restaurants and reenter the Russian market in the next 15 years.	850
10	Belarus	December 10, 1996	November 27, 2022	In November 2022, it was announced that McDonald's would be suspending operations in Belarus, and did so on November 27, and claimed the Russian fast food chain Vkusno i tochka (Вкусно и точка, Tasty, period) would take its place. Instead, the restaurants began operating under the sign, "We are open!". On April 18, 2023, the restaurant chain was renamed Mak.by.	25
11	Bosnia and Herzegovina	July 20, 2011	December 31, 2022	Closed "until further notice" due to McDonald's having its license to operating in the country revoked. The restaurants were later rebranded as Bash.	6
12	Kazakhstan	March 8, 2016	January 5, 2023	Suspended due to serious supply restrictions that buying burger patties from Russia was prohibited due to Russian invasion of Ukraine. Since August, the network had operated under different names, based on the names of company employees. On November 23, they were rebranded to I'm.	24
13	Sri Lanka	October 16, 1998	March 25, 2024	On March 25, 2024, all 12 outlets were temporarily closed until further notice as a result of McDonald's terminating its agreement with its Sri Lankan franchisee, Abans Plc, after being ordered by the Colombo High Court not to use the McDonald's branding. There were also allegations of poor hygiene. McDonald's Corporation and International Restaurant Systems (Private) Limited have mutually agreed to end their franchise relationship in Sri Lanka. The companies reached a legal settlement that both parties found agreeable.	12

== Planned or restricted locations ==
#	Country/territory	Date of first store	First outlet location	No. of operating outlets	Notes
1	Guernsey	August 1, 1997	L'Ancresse	1	
2	Mayotte	May 1, 2003	Mamoudzou	1	See McDonald's Guadeloupe, Martinique and Guiana
3	Iraq	August 10, 2006	Baghdad	1	One outlet in Baghdad for the U.S. Army, but there is a knock-off chain called MaDonal.

== See also ==
- Big Mac Index
- Dell Theory of Conflict Prevention
- Golden Arches Theory of Conflict Prevention
- International availability of McDonald's products
- List of countries with Burger King franchises
- List of countries with KFC franchises
- List of countries with Jollibee outlets
- List of sovereign states
- Lists of restaurants
- MaDonal
- McDonaldization
- McWorld
