= Bhartia =

Bhartia may refer to:

- Shobhana Bhartia (born 1957), Indian businesswoman
- Jubilant Bhartia Group, Indian conglomerate
