= McDonald's South Africa =

South African fast food chain

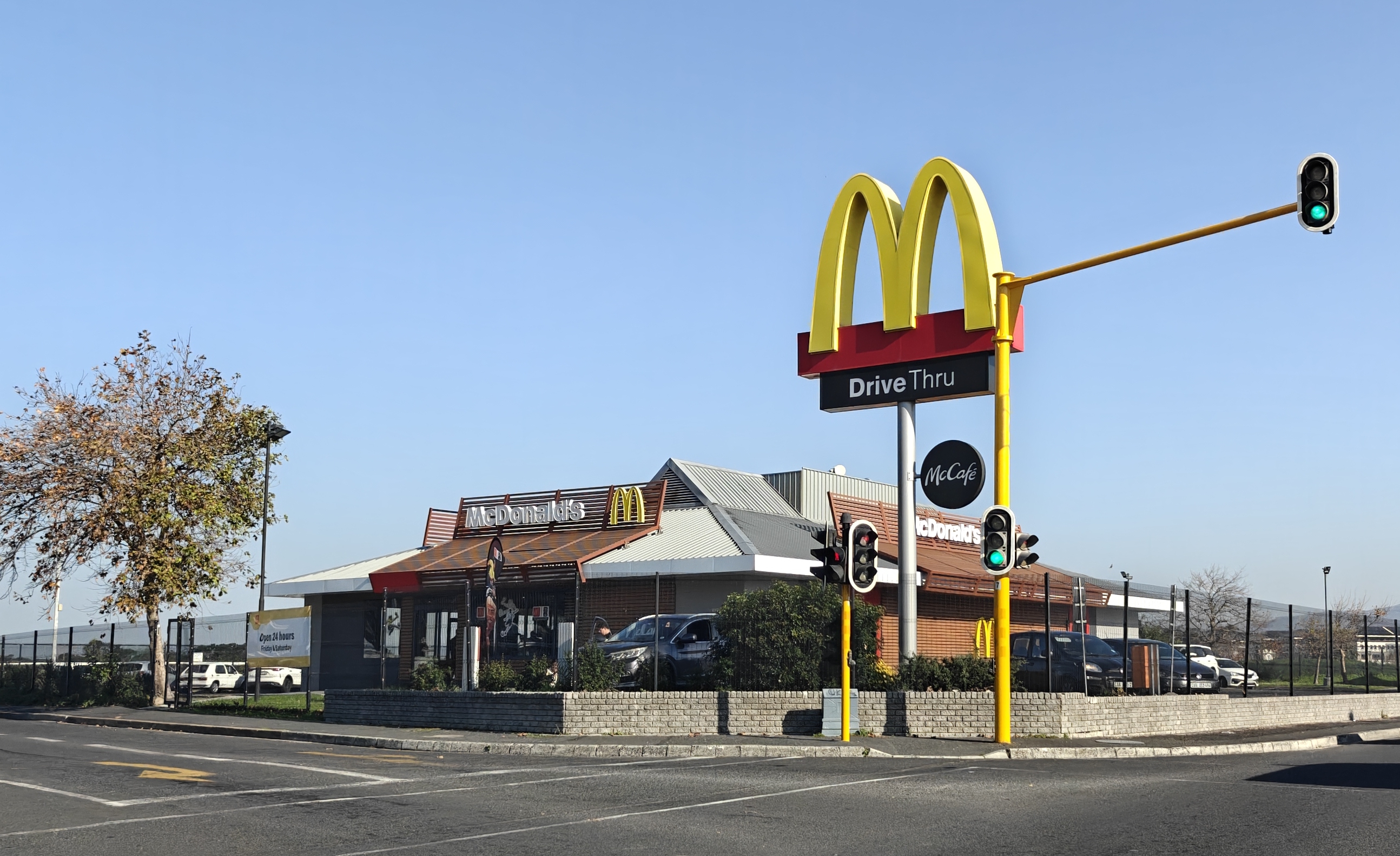
- McDonald's outlet in Kenilworth, Cape Town
- Type: Subsidiary (master franchise)
- Industry: Fast food
- Founded: 1995; 31 years ago
- Headquarters: Sandton, Gauteng, South Africa
- Number of locations: 400+ (2026)
- Area served: South Africa
- Key people: Max Oliva (CEO)
- Products: Food; Beverages
- Number of employees: 17,000+ (2025)
- Parent: McDonald's
- Website: www.mcdonalds.co.za

McDonald's South Africa (MDSA) is a fast food chain, and the South African master franchise of major US company McDonald's.

The company was founded in 1995, and is headquartered in Sandton, Gauteng. As of late 2025, it operates over 400 outlets across South Africa.

== History ==
McDonald's South Africa opened its first restaurant in 1995. Upon establishment in South Africa, the local franchise was owned directly by its American parent company.

In 2001, McDonald's South Africa had reached 100 stores.

In 2008, McDonald's launched the McCafé concept in South Africa.

In 2011, it was announced that South African billionaire businessman Cyril Ramaphosa, who served on the Advisory Boards of Coca-Cola SA and Unilever SA, would become McDonald's SA's new owner. Ramaphosa signed a 20-year master franchise agreement under the parent company's development licensee model, which at the time was operational in over 50 of the company's 117 markets of operation. Under this model, the licensee owns all the assets in the market, including the real estate. At the time of the agreement, MDSA had 145 outlets in South Africa.

In 2014, MDSA reached a total of 200 stores, across all nine of South Africa's provinces, and was employing over 10,000 individuals.

In September 2016, then-Deputy President of South Africa Cyril Ramaphosa sold MDSA to Emirati company MSA Holdings. At the time the company was sold, Ramaphosa had already stepped down as chairman of investment firm Shanduka Group. He did so in May 2015, after entering politics the year before.

In November that same year, it was announced that McDonald's SA had partnered with WeChat to offer the latter's Quick Pay QR code-based payment option at certain MDSA outlets in Cape Town and Johannesburg.

In 2018, McDonald's SA launched free-standing self-service kiosks in its stores.

In October 2024, McDonald's SA began rolling out a feature where customers could place orders for pickup on the company's app. Pricing was the same as in-store. Before the feature launched, MDSA customers could only order the company's food via third-party apps like Uber Eats and Mr D. The service, which was expanded the following month, offered pickup options including curbside pickup, drive-through, counter, and table service.

== Operations ==
As of mid-2026, McDonald's SA operates over 400 franchised stores throughout the country. Over 80% of food produced at MDSA outlets uses locally sourced ingredients.

== See also ==
- List of countries with McDonald's restaurants
- International availability of McDonald's products
