= Burgeranch =

Israeli fast-food chain

- Native name: בורגראנץ'
- Company type: Private
- Industry: Restaurants
- Founded: 1972; 54 years ago
- Founder: Barry Scop; Ron Lapid
- Headquarters: Netanya, Israel
- Number of locations: 64 restaurants
- Area served: Israel and the West Bank
- Products: Fast food (hamburgers · chicken · french fries · soft drinks · salads · desserts)
- Number of employees: 1600
- Website: burgeranch.co.il

Burgeranch, also known as Burger Ranch, (Hebrew: בורגראנץ') is an Israeli fast-food chain. In 2010, the Burgeranch chain included 107 restaurants with over 1500 employees, competing primarily with McDonald's Israel and Burger King Israel. In October 2014 there were 79 restaurants in the system and in 2022 there were 64, according to the company website.

== History ==
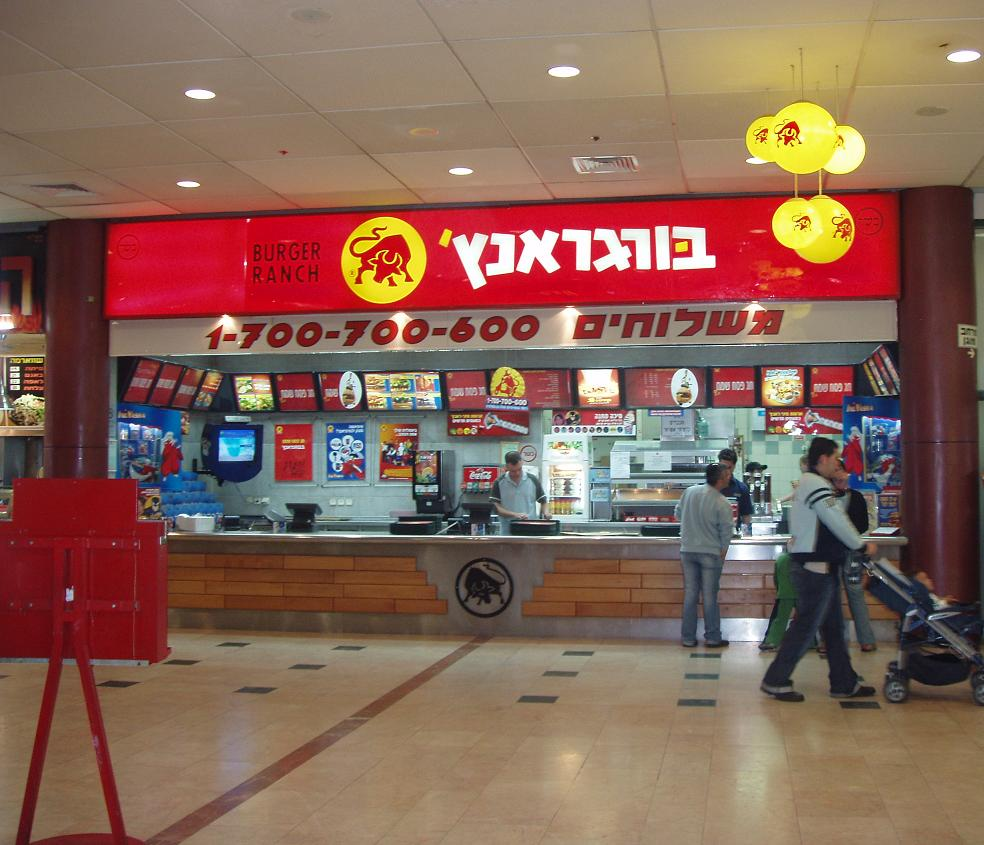
A Burgeranch restaurant in Ashdod, Israel

The first Burgeranch in Israel opened in 1972 on Ben Yehuda Street in Tel Aviv by Barry Scop and Ron Lapid. An article in the Jerusalem Post claimed that the chain had origins in South Africa. In 1978, a second restaurant opened on Ibn Gvirol Street. Two more branches opened in 1979 in Ramat Hasharon and Dizengoff Center. By 1993, when McDonald's entered the Israeli market, Burgeranch was the largest restaurant chain in Israel, with 49 restaurants.

In 1997, 74 percent of Burgeranch was acquired by Paz Oil Company Ltd. At the end of 2001, Paz completed the acquisition, becoming 100 percent owners of the chain. New branches of Burgeranch were opened at Paz gas stations. In 2006, Paz sold the chain to the Israeli businessman Yossi Hoshinski. In early 2008 Hoshinshki died of a heart attack, and the company went into bankruptcy. In 2008, Orgad Holdings bought out Burgeranch for over NIS 20 million.

One scholar connected the rise of Burgerranch, along with Burger King and McDonalds, to the Americanization of Israeli society.

=== Discussions with Burger King ===
In 1992, when Burger King entered the Israeli market, it discussed a deal with Burgeranch but the talks failed. Burger King Israel went on to open over 50 restaurants. Burgeranch tried to take over Burger King in Israel, but was blocked by monopoly laws. In 2005, after Burger King declared bankruptcy – following a series of other American-based companies such as Starbucks, Wendy's, and Dunkin' Donuts that had struggled to succeed in the Israeli market – it was purchased by Orgad Holdings.

In 2010, it announced that Orgad Holdings would be re-branding Burger King Israel as Burgeranch. At the time the two chains were merged there were 55 Burgeranches and 52 Burger Kings, creating 107 Burgeranches.

In November 2014, it was reported that a group of investors (including Yair Hasson, the first Israeli Burger King franchiser) was in talks to purchase 51 of the then 72 Burgeranch locations for conversion to Burger Kings. The remaining 21 locations would be shut down. The proposed sale failed and Burger King was relaunched in Israel, without ties to Burgeranch, in December 2015.

=== Ben Gurion Airport ===
In October 2011 it was announced that Burgeranch had outbid McDonald's for the two prime locations in Ben Gurion Airport. Due to the large influx of people through the airport these locations are estimated to have $8 million a year in sales, or approximately four times the $2.2 million rent for these locations. In October 2019, Burger Ranch closed at Ben Gurion airport. Reports say it is to be replaced by McDonald's.

== Kashrut ==
Around two-thirds of Burgeranch restaurants purvey all-kosher foods, the rest do not. This is primarily for business reasons, because certified kosher restaurants are required to close on Saturdays and Jewish holidays. This also occurs because a restaurant is not permitted to purvey both kosher and non-kosher foods.

== See also ==
- List of hamburger restaurants
