= Burger King Israel =

Fast food chain of Israel

Burger King Israel (ברגר קינג)
- Industry: Restaurant
- Genre: Fast food
- Founded: Israel (1993-2010, 2016-present)
- Headquarters: Israel
- Number of locations: 18
- Area served: Israel
- Key people: Pierre Besnainou (Chairman)
- Products: hamburgers, chicken, french fries, desserts and soft drinks
- Number of employees: TBA
- Parent: Burger King
- Website: burgerking.co.il

Hebrew logo used until 2003.

Burger King Israel (Hebrew: ברגר קינג) is the Israeli franchise of international fast food chain Burger King. Burger King first entered the Israeli market in 1993. It eventually closed in 2010, after the franchise owner Orgad Holdings purchased local chain Burgeranch and converted all Burger King locations in the country into Burgeranch locations. In July 2013, it was announced that Burger King was attempting to re-enter Israel. Initial discussions with its original Israeli franchise owner Yair Hasson were unsuccessful, and it finally secured re-entrance to the country by entering into a deal with a French company. The first restaurant, under the new franchise group opened in February 2016, at Rabin Square in Tel Aviv. As of 2025, there are 18 branches around the country, of which 16 are in Tel Aviv and its suburbs. Out of all these locations, 10 are Kosher branches. The two locations outside Gush Dan are in Mizpe Ramon and at the Ramon Airport in Eilat.

== History ==
=== Initial run, 1993–2010 ===
Burger King first entered Israel in 1993, under the ownership of Yair Hasson, Meshulam Riklis and Kamor Motors. In 1998, Hasson and Riklis bought out Kamor for USD$14.8 million. In 2001 Hasson sold his share to Riklis, making Riklis the sole owner.

Upon Hasson's departure, the company's management underwent several changes, including several new CEOs over the next few years. Each CEO tried to change the chain's strategy, all of which proved ineffective. Eventually, this led to the franchise's collapse after Burger King slowed down the deployment of its branches. In 2003, Burger King Israel had accumulated ₪98 million (US$27 million) in debt. Brothers Eli and Yuval Orgad bought the chain's fifty-six restaurants for ₪30 million (US$8.3 million).

Burger King Israel was purchased by Orgad Holdings after declaring bankruptcy in 2005, the locations remained open.

The owner of Burgeranch, Yossi Hoshinski, died of a heart attack in early 2008; shortly thereafter, Burgeranch entered bankruptcy. Orgad Holdings bought Burgeranch from bankruptcy for over NIS 100 million. In 2010, it was announced that Orgad Holdings would be re-branding its Burger King locations as Burgeranch. At the time the two chains were merged there were 55 Burgeranch locations and 52 Burger King locations, creating 107 locations in the country.

=== Failed re-emergence, 2013–14 ===
In July 2013 it was announced that Burger King was attempting to return to the Israeli market, three years after the dissolution of its franchise in the country. The company's desire to re-enter Israel stemmed from recent ownership changes in the parent company. In late 2010, the chain was acquired by Brazilian private equity fund 3G Capital for US$4 billion. The new ownership enacted an aggressive strategy of entering markets Burger King was currently not operating in, in a bid to chip away at the market share of its competitors. Discussions for a new franchise owner included Yair Hasson, Burger King's former franchisee in Israel. If the negotiations had proved successful, twelve new Burger King restaurants were expected to open within the first year it reentered the Israeli market, with fifteen more set to open in 2014.

In November 2014, news began to circulate that Burgeranch was in talks to sell fifty-one of their seventy-two locations to a new business group, including Hasson, that would convert them back into Burger King locations. The remaining twenty-one locations would be shut down under the agreement. The deal fell through.

=== Re-emergence, since 2015 ===
In June 2015, a group of investors, including Pierre Besnainou, obtained the Israeli franchise for the brand. Fifty branches around the country are planned within five years, at an initial investment of US$12 million. The first branch opened on 1 February 2016 across from Rabin Square in Tel Aviv, which is not kosher. On 9 March their second location opened, in the Ramat HaHayal neighborhood in Tel Aviv. As of 2020, there are 11 branches in the country.

On 6 April and 11 April 2016, the third and fourth locations opened, in Dizengoff Center and Azrieli Center respectively. Both of these locations were kosher, making half of the locations in Israel kosher. In 2017, an additional kosher branch was opening in Hod Hasharon and an unkosher branch in Beersheba.

During the Jewish festival of Hanukkah, Jews traditionally indulge in eating oily and fried foods—such as sufganiyot (Hebrew: סופגניות), an Israeli round jelly doughnut—in connection to the miracle of the cruse of oil. In 2016, Burger King Israel introduced their "SufganiKing" (Hebrew: סופגניקינג): a Whopper with two sufganiyot in place of the bun. The SufganiKing was available during Hanukkah 2016 (25 December 2016 – 1 January 2017), and costed ₪14.90 (US$4.00). Burger King Israel's chief executive officer, Steve Benchimol, said of the SufganiKing, "This matching of two popular Israeli food items was inevitable for us. We’re proud to be able to end 2016 on a creative, festive note." Burger King Israel employees who had eaten the SufganiKing called it "delicious".

== Controversy ==
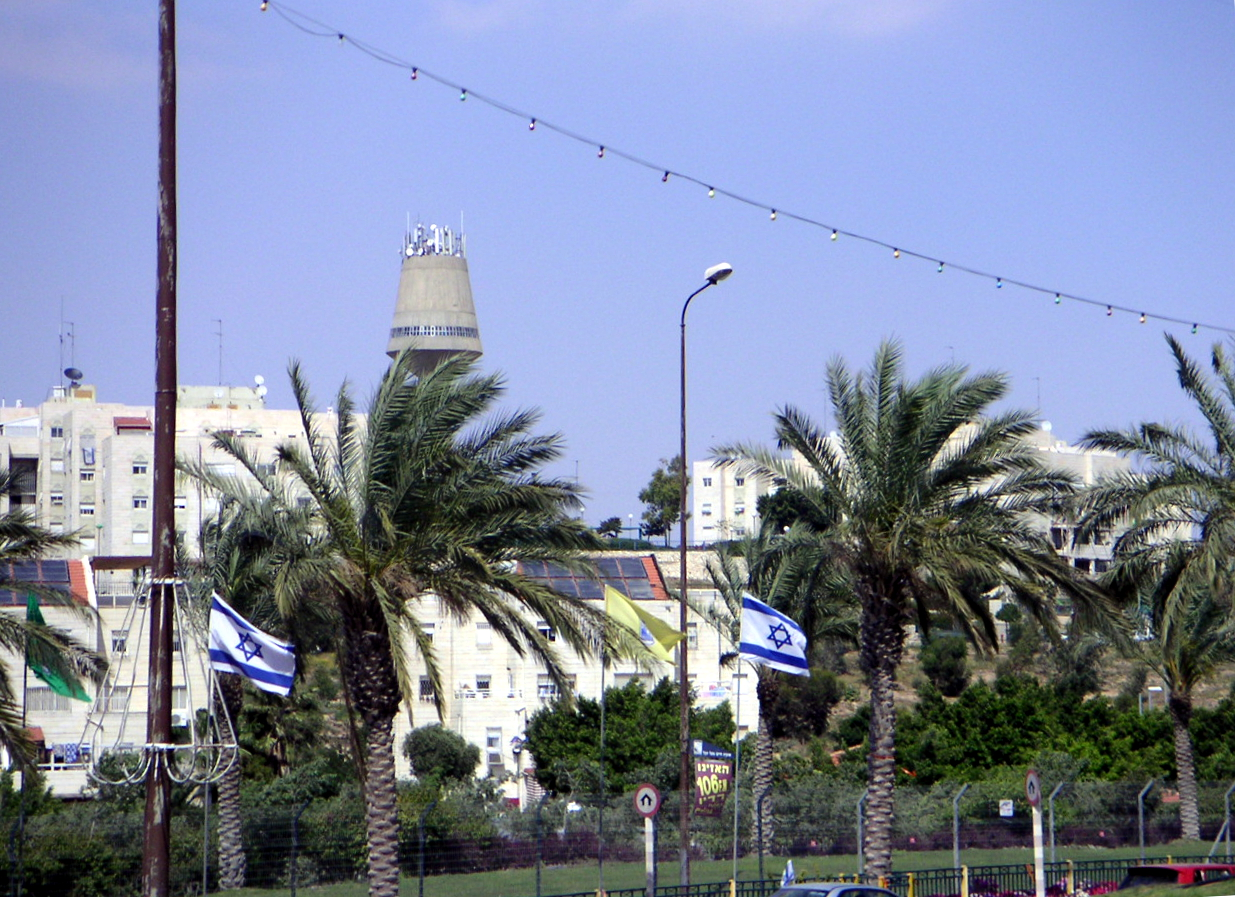
A view of the Ma'aleh Adumim settlement

In the middle of 1999, a geopolitical dispute with the global Islamic community and Jewish groups in the United States and Israel arose over an Israeli franchisee opening stores in the West Bank. When Burger King franchisee in Israel, Rikamor, Ltd., opened a store in the West Bank settlement of Ma'aleh Adumim in August of that year, Islamic groups, including the Arab League and American Muslims for Jerusalem, argued that international Burger King parent Burger King Corporation's licensing of the store helped legitimize the illegal settlement. Beyond the called-for Islamic boycott of the company, the Arab League also threatened the revocation of the business licenses of Burger King's primary Middle Eastern franchise in the twenty-two countries that are part of the league's membership.

Burger King Corporation quickly pulled the franchise license for that location and had the store shuttered explaining that Rikamor, Ltd. had violated its contract by opening the location in the West Bank. Several American-based Jewish groups issued statements that denounced the decision as acceding to threats of boycotts by Islamic groups. Burger King Corporation issued a statement that it "made this decision purely on a commercial basis and in the best interests of thousands of people who depend on the Burger King reputation for their livelihood".

Following the Israel-Hamas war, Burger King Israel has faced boycott calls after it donated food to the Israel Defence Forces.

== See also ==
- Culture of Israel
- Israeli cuisine
- Economy of Israel
- List of hamburger restaurants
- List of restaurants in Israel
