= McDonald's France =

French subsidiary of international fast food chain McDonald's

- Company type: Subsidiary
- Industry: Restaurant
- Genre: Fast food
- Founded: June 30, 1972 (first restaurant)
- Headquarters: Guyancourt, Yvelines, France
- Number of locations: 1,485 (as of 2020)
- Area served: France
- Key people: Raymond Dayan (Franchisee); Michel Ksiazenicer (Franchisee)
- Products: Hamburgers; chicken; french fries; soft drinks; milkshakes; desserts; pies; coffee; breakfast
- Services: Franchising
- Number of employees: 1,485 (2020)
- Parent: McDonald's Corporation
- Website: mcdonalds.fr

McDonald's France, colloquially called McDo, (Note: French pronunciation: [makdo]) is the French subsidiary of the international fast food restaurant chain McDonald's. Its first location opened in 1972 by franchisee Raymond Dayan in Creteil, France, although the company itself still recognizes the first outlet as opening in Strasbourg in 1979. McDonald's France currently has over 1,485 restaurants operating nationwide, serving an estimated forty-six million people each week.

McDonald's French operations are based in Guyancourt, Yvelines.

== History ==
According to McDonald's official history, the chain created its first restaurant in France in 1979. However, in reality, the first "McDo" in France opened its doors on June 30, 1972, in Créteil, a suburb of Paris, thanks to the initiative of French businessman Raymond Dayan, who had signed a franchise agreement with the company. Since McDonald's didn't believe that the hamburger would be successful in the country of gastronomy, the contract authorized the Frenchman to create up to 150 restaurants over thirty years for a royalty of only 1.5% of the turnover instead of the usual 10 to 20%.

Due to its success, by the end of the decade, Dayan had 14 establishments that sold almost twice as much as in any other country, and McDonald's offered to buy his restaurants. However, Dayan refused, and McDonald's filed a lawsuit against him for non-compliance with production and hygiene standards, which they won in 1982 after a long legal battle. Dayan kept his restaurants, but he had to rename them O'Kitch and eventually sold them to Quick restaurants in 1986.

Without even waiting for the end of the lawsuit, McDonald's opened a restaurant in Strasbourg in 1979.

In 2009, McDonald's France modified its logo, replacing the red color with green, in a marketing strategy to fight against the reputation of being environmentally unconscious and present a greener image.

== Menu ==
As with McDonald's locations worldwide, the franchise primarily sells hamburgers, cheeseburgers, chicken, french fries, breakfast items, soft drinks, milkshakes and desserts. In response to changing consumer tastes, the company has expanded its menu to include salads, fish, wraps, smoothies, and fruit. The company also operates the McCafé chain within many of its stores. McDonald's in France is known for its pastries such as croissants, doughnuts, pain au chocolat, and macarons. There is also a McBaguette, introduced in 2012, filled with two burger patties, two slices of Emmental cheese, lettuce, and French mustard. It is typically offered seasonally and resurged in popularity in 2022 after being featured in the TV series Emily in Paris.

== Technology ==
In 2016, in what U.S. media described as "McDonald's of the future," over 90% of McDonald's France had self-ordering touchscreen kiosks. McDonald's France smartphone app, GoMcDo, was one of the first in France to offer integration with Apple Wallet.

McDonald's France also has introduced reusable tableware in an effort to cut down on food waste after French law banned single-use packaging and tableware for dine-in customers at all fast-food restaurants and other catering establishments with a seating capacity of 20 or more in 2023. The tableware has been praised internationally for its aesthetics and design language.
