= McDonald's Israel =

Israeli master franchise of the fast food restaurant chain McDonald's

McDonald's Israel מקדונלד'ס ישראל

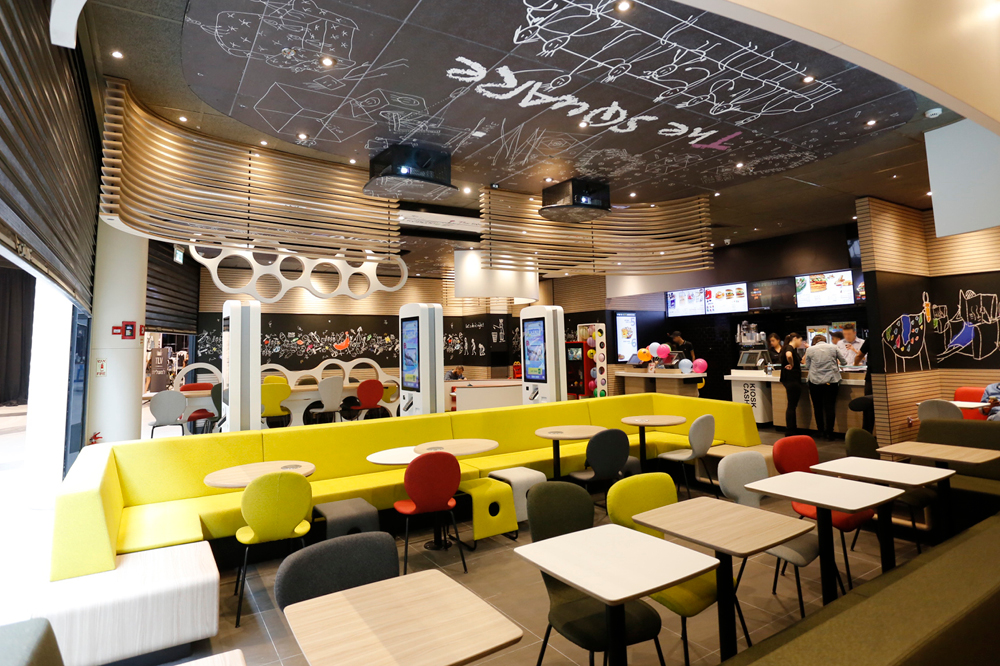
- A McDonald's Restaurant in Tel Aviv
- Type: Subsidiary
- Industry: Fast food
- Founded: 14 October 1993; 33 years ago in Ramat Gan, Israel
- Founder: Omri Padan
- Headquarters: Ga'ash, Israel
- Number of locations: 161 standard non kosher restaurants 68 kosher restaurants (2023)
- Area served: Israel
- Services: Master franchise
- Owner: McDonald's Corporation
- Number of employees: 6,000+ (2015)
- Website: www.mcdonalds.co.il

McDonald's Israel (Hebrew: מקדונלד'ס ישראל, romanized: McDonald's Yisra'el) is the Israeli master franchise of the fast food restaurant chain McDonald's. Previously operated and licensed by Alonyal Limited (Hebrew: אלוניאל בע"מ, Alonyal Ba'am), McDonald's Israel is the largest of Israel's burger chains with a 60% market share. It was the first Israeli outlet to be opened in 1993 and a major competitor of the local restaurant chain Burger Ranch. The world's first kosher McDonald's was opened in Mevaseret Zion in October 1995. After a sales decline attributed to consumer boycotts as part of the BDS movement, McDonald's Corporation announced in 2024 that it would buy Alonyal pending regulatory approval.

McDonald's Israel was founded by Israeli businessman Omri Padan. As of 2023, McDonald's has 228 restaurants in Israel, with 69 of them under Kosher supervision. This means that they are closed on Shabbat and Jewish holidays, have no mixed meat and dairy products (such as cheeseburgers), and for Passover serve the meat on Passover buns. In Israel, most branches are non-kosher since they serve cheeseburgers (which are non-kosher, i.e. do not conform to traditional Jewish dietary law) by special request (they are not on the menu) and serve milk-based desserts (ice cream, milkshakes). Some of the kosher branches serve milk products in a separate section of the restaurant. McDonald's Israel does not operate restaurants in the West Bank and Golan Heights.

McDonald's Israel claims to source over 80% of its ingredients locally. This includes kosher beef patties, potatoes, lettuce, buns and milkshake mix.

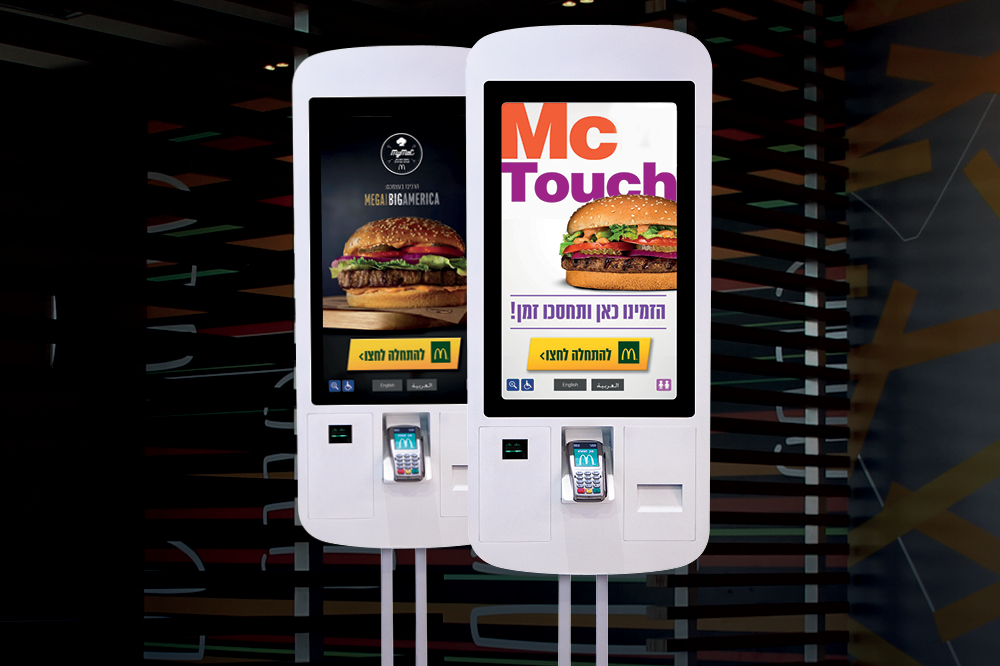
McTouch - McDonald's Israel

== History ==
=== 1990s ===
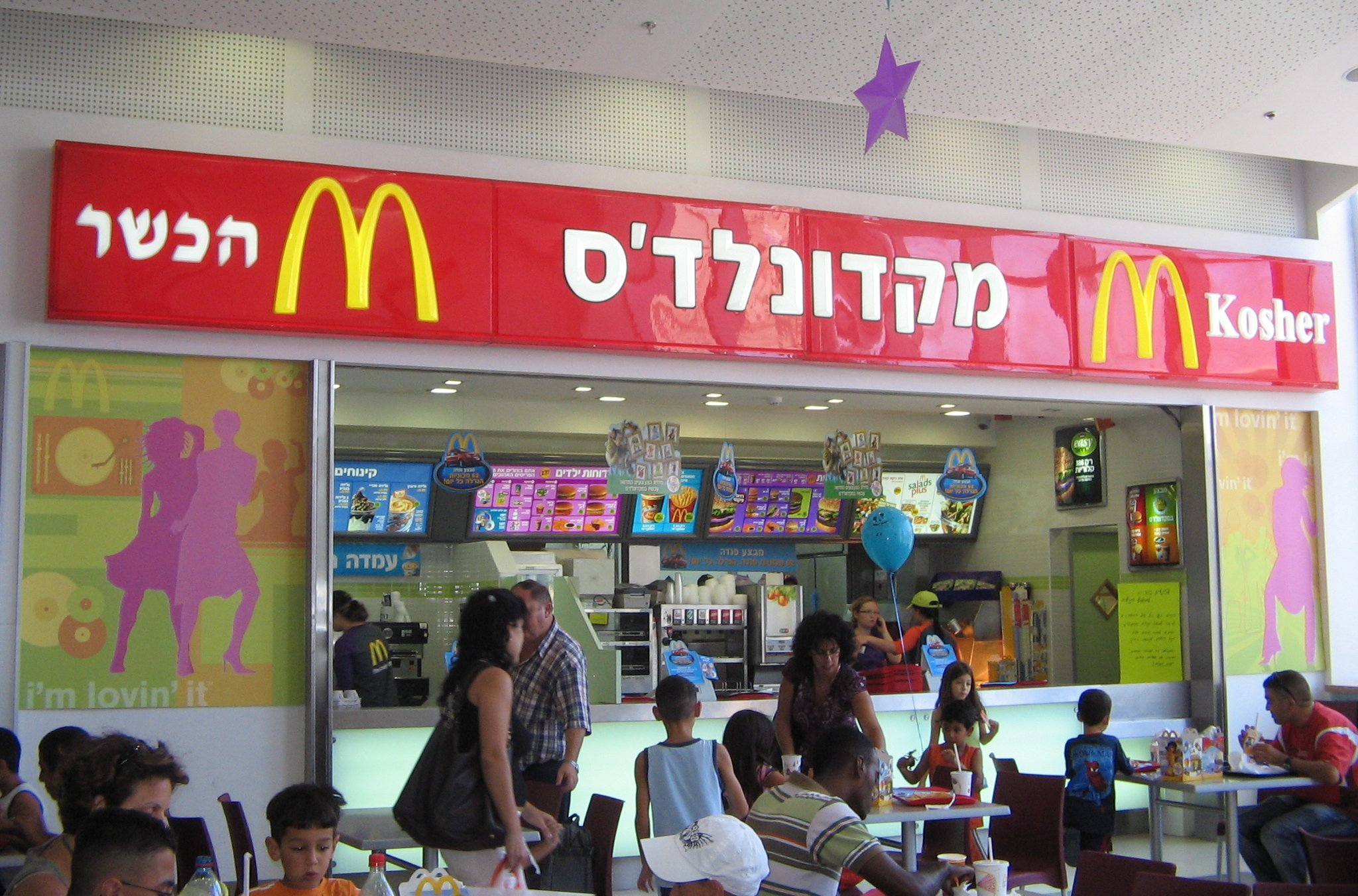
A McDonald's in Ashkelon, Israel (2007)

McDonald's entered Israel in 1993. The first branch was at the Ayalon Mall in Ramat Gan. In the wake of a controversy over importing French fries to Israel, the American fast food chain decided to manufacture frozen French fries in Israel at a cost of $5 million US.

In 1994, the Golani Interchange branch aroused controversy when the restaurant installed a large 'golden arches' sign in front of the Golani Brigade museum and memorial. Bereaved families and other citizens claimed this desecrated the site. The sign was later reduced in size.

In 1997, McDonald's Israel opened its first branch in an Israeli Arab city. The restaurant was in Tamra, 27 kilometers (17 mi) northeast of Nazareth, and the menu was bilingual, in Hebrew and Arabic.

In 1998, McDonald's Israel began to barbecue hamburgers on charcoal instead of frying them. This represented a shift in McDonald's policy, which previously required uniformity at all its locations. In the wake of this decision, grilling equipment was installed at the restaurants, and the size of the patty and bun were increased.

=== 2000s ===
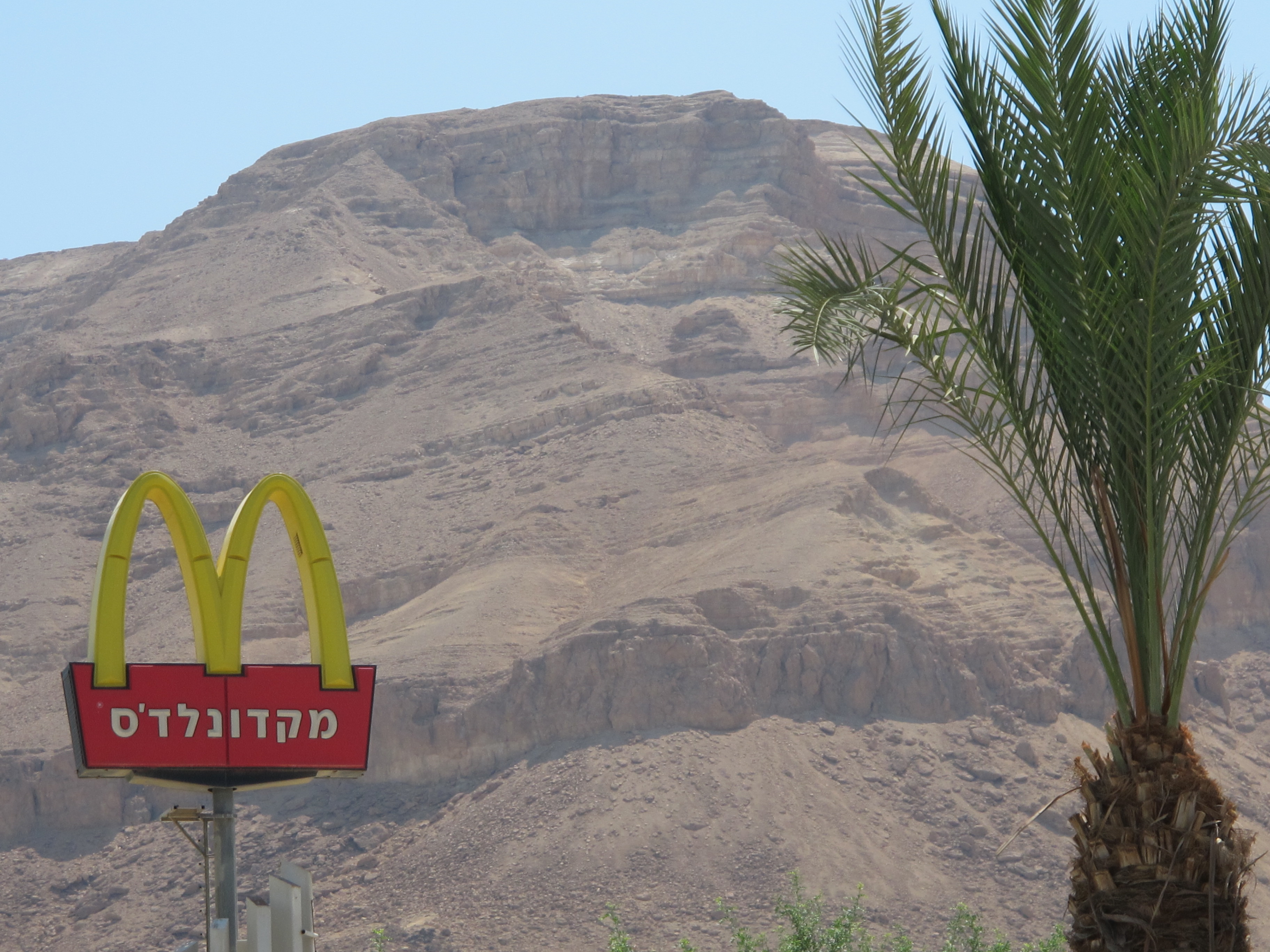
McDonald's sign in the middle of a desert near the Dead Sea

In 2004, the company was criticized for ordering its Arabic and Russian-speaking staff to speak only Hebrew during work hours. Their motivation behind this decision was to "prevent uncomfortable situations for workers and clients who mostly speak Hebrew," but the order was subsequently withdrawn.

In 2006, the international chain's trademark yellow and red signs were replaced at two branches in Tel Aviv with blue and white signs with the Hebrew word "kosher" in order to avoid confusion over which branches were kosher.

=== 2010s ===
McDonald's Israel, in June 2013, turned down an offer to open a restaurant in Ariel in June 2013, citing its declared policy not to open any branches in West Bank settlements across the Green Line.

In 2015, McDonald's Israel introduced the mobile application McApp, which enabled customers to order on line and pick up their order when ready.

In January 2017, McDonald's Israel introduced McTouch stands to their restaurants, which enable customers to order meals without standing in line. The McTouch offers the 'My Mac' option, allowing customers to create their own hamburgers with their preferences and favorites, choosing from various dressings and extra components such as guacamole and fried onion rings.

In 2017, McDonald's Israel's McRoyal hamburger was chosen by Channel 10's "Osot Cheshbon" (translated: Making The Bill) program as "The Most Outstanding & Healthiest Hamburger in Israel", following laboratory exam.

=== 2020s ===
On 4 April 2024, McDonald's Corporation announced that it would purchase the franchise owner Alonyal, which would make the Israeli McDonald's franchise corporate-owned, pending regulatory approval. The announcement was after a boycott was called due to the franchise offering free meals to the Israel Defense Forces during the Gaza war.

== Kashrut ==
While McDonald's operates several Kosher and non-Kosher restaurants, all the beef served in the restaurants is kosher beef. The difference is that the non-Kosher branches open on Shabbat and Jewish holidays, in addition to serving dairy products and cheeseburgers. A kosher McDonald's was also opened in Argentina, at the Abasto de Buenos Aires shopping mall. Argentina and Israel are the only branches in the world that barbecue their burgers on charcoal.

== Charities ==
Similar to McDonald's charitable efforts in the other countries they operate, McDonald's Israel has donated to charities which benefit children such as Schneider Children's Hospital, "Make A Wish Association", and "The Fighting Cancer Association." McDonald's Israel also has its own "McSmile Program," which sponsors trips for children recovering from cancer.

== Menu ==
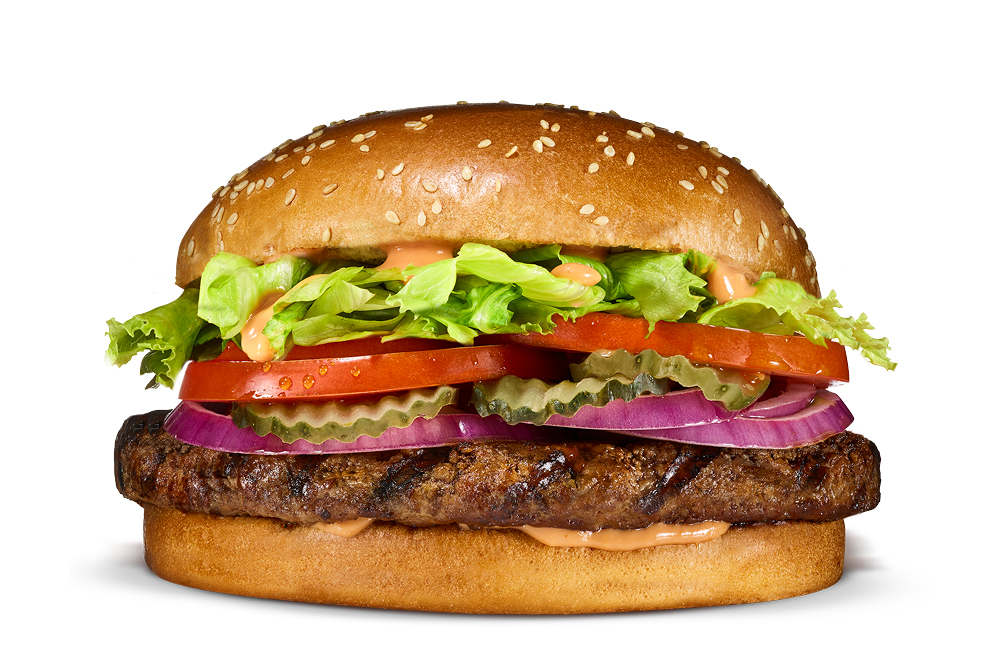
McRoyal on the McDonald's Israel menu

The regular McDonald's menu has some additions catering to local tastes. McKebab (Hebrew: מקקבב) was served in tortilla. Israeli salad was added to the menu in 2007. In January 2011, McDonald's Israel introduced McFalafel (Hebrew: מקפלאפל) in all its restaurants, but was removed from the menu in July 2011, until its revival in July 2021. McDonald's Israel also serves the Big America series, which consists of six burgers - the Big New York, the Big Texas, the Big Chicago, the Big Miami, the Big Las Vegas and the Big Broadway. All of the burgers are served with either a 0.5 pound patty (225 grams) or a 0.275 pound patty (125 grams) and with slight differences in the sauce and the onions.

As with most McDonald's locales, McDonald's Israel uses beef patty containing around 10% fat. In addition, it uses canola oil and has reduced sodium and increased the proportion of vegetables in the dishes.

In compliance with kashrut, McDonald's restaurants in Israel do not serve pork products. However, they have been criticized by Jewish religious leaders for serving cheeseburgers and employing Jewish workers on Saturdays, the Jewish Sabbath.

== Controversies ==
During the Gaza war, amidst the Israeli blockade of supplies in Gaza, McDonald's in Israel was condemned after giving free food to the Israel Defense Forces who were accused of committing war crimes against Palestinians. The hashtag #BoycottMcDonalds gained worldwide traction on social media. There were also large gatherings outside restaurants in Lebanon and Egypt protesting the move. McDonald's in other Muslim countries such as Turkey and Pakistan, distanced themselves from the Israeli brand and pledged aid to Gaza.

In January 2024, McDonald's CEO Chris Kempczinski acknowledged the backlash, stating, "Several markets in the Middle East and some outside the region are experiencing a meaningful business impact due to the war and associated misinformation that is affecting brands like McDonald's". In April 2024, McDonald's purchased the franchise, from its previous owner, Alonyal, due to falling sales in nearby Arab countries.

== See also ==
- Culture of Israel
- Economy of Israel
- Israeli cuisine
- List of hamburger restaurants
- List of restaurants in Israel
