= Hugh Morris (businessman) =

New Zealand businessman

- Born: Hugh William Morris; 2 July 1929; Oxford, New Zealand
- Died: 20 May 2010 (aged 80); Auckland, New Zealand
- Occupation: Businessman
- Known for: Co-founder of McDonald's in New Zealand

Hugh William Morris (2 July 1929 – 20 May 2010) was a New Zealand businessman who co-founded McDonald's New Zealand in 1976.

Morris established the first McDonald's in New Zealand in 1976 with business partners Lionel Whitehead, Gary Lloydd, Ray Stonelake, and his brother, Wally Morris. The first McDonald's restaurant opened in Porirua on 7 June 1976. Morris emphasised employee training and franchising, and headed the McDonald's New Zealand company for more than 20 years, until his retirement in the mid-1990s.

Morris died on 20 May 2010, after an extended illness. He was survived by his wife, Meryl, three children and three stepchildren.
