= Jubilant Bhartia Group =

Indian company

- Type: Conglomerate
- Founded: 21 June 1978; 48 years ago in Noida
- Founders: Shyam Sundar Bhartia; Hari Bhartia
- Headquarters: 1A, Sector 16A, Noida, Uttar Pradesh, India
- Area served: Worldwide
- Key people: Shyam Bhartia (Chairman & MD); Hari Bhartia (Co-Chairman & MD)
- Revenue: $3 billion (2012)
- Owners: Shyam Sundar Bhartia; Hari Bhartia
- Number of employees: 46,000 (2021)
- Website: www.jubilantbhartia.com

The Jubilant Bhartia Group is an Indian conglomerate with interests in pharmaceuticals, food services, agribusiness, energy, and other services. It was founded in 1978 by Shyam Sundar Bhartia and Hari Bhartia and is headquartered in Noida, Uttar Pradesh.

== History ==
Brothers Shyam Sundar Bhartia (husband of Shobhana Bhartia) and Hari Bhartia founded Vam Organics Limited on 21 June 1978. The name was the abbreviation of the product the company manufactured, vinyl acetate monomer (VAM). The business was seeded with funds obtained from their father Mohan Lal Bhartia, who was a steel wire and Rolex watch trader in Kolkata. Vam Organics gained opportunities to carry out higher-value work for drug and chemical industries following economic liberalisation in India in the 1990s. The company was renamed Jubilant Organosys in 2001, which began the use of the name "Jubilant" for the group.

On the recommendation of a friend who owned foreign pizza licences, the Bhartias entered into a master franchise partnership with Domino's Pizza in 1996 and established Dominos Pizza India Private Limited. The company changed its name to Jubilant FoodWorks in 2009.

The Jubilant Bhartia Group had revenues of over $3 billion in 2012.

== Companies ==
The Jubilant Bhartia Group has four flagship companies - Jubilant Pharmova, Jubilant Ingrevia, Jubilant FoodWorks and Jubilant Industries - all of which are publicly listed. The Group's other businesses are registered as private limited companies.

=== Jubilant Pharmova ===
Jubilant Pharmova is the Jubilant Bhartia Group's first company and was established in 1978. The company was renamed Jubilant Organosys Limited in 2001, and Jubilant Life Sciences Limited in July 2010. Jubilant Life Sciences was demerged to Jubilant Ingrevia on 1 February 2021, and Jubilant Life Science Limited was renamed Jubilant Pharmova Limited. The company has 3 business segments; pharmaceuticals, contract research and development services (CRO), and proprietary novel drugs. Jubilant Pharmova is also a contract manufacturer of sterile injectables, ophthalmics, otics and ointments (sterile and non-sterile), creams and liquids. The company has the second largest commercial radio pharmacy network in the United States (US), and is the second largest company in the allergenic extract market in the US.

=== Jubilant Ingrevia ===
The Jubilant Bhartia Group demerged its pharma and life sciences business, Jubilant Life Sciences Limited, to a new company called Jubilant Ingrevia Limited on 1 February 2021. The name Ingrevia is a portmanteau of the words "ingredients" and "life" (vie in French). Jubilant Ingrevia was listed on the Bombay Stock Exchange on 19 March 2021. The company is diversifed life sciences and chemicals company. The company's operations can be divided into three segments; speciality chemicals, nutrition and health solutions and life science chemicals. As of 2022, the speciality chemicals contributed 33% of Jubilant Ingrevia's revenue, nutrition and health solutions contributed 18% and life science chemicals contributed 49%.

As of 2022, Jubilant Ingrevia is the world's lowest cost producer of pyridine-based derivative products, one of the two producers of pyridine and a leader in 14 pyridine derivatives. The company is one of the two largest manufactures of vitamin B3 globally, one of India's largest manufactures of vitamin B4, one of the two largest producers of acetic anhydride, and a large producer of ethyl acetate. Jubilant Ingrevia also offers speciality grades of ethanol, for uses in the pharmaceuticals, agrochemicals, personal care, and fuel blending sectors. The company produces the ethanol from sugarcane molasses.

Jubilant Ingrevia also offers contract development and manufacturing (CDMO) services to international innovator pharmaceutical and agrochemical companies. In 2022, the company signed a Rs 270 crore speciality chemicals CDMO contract with a top 10 globally leading innovator pharmaceutical company.

=== Jubilant FoodWorks ===
Jubilant FoodWorks Limited is a food service company which holds the master franchise for Domino's Pizza in India, Nepal, Sri Lanka and Bangladesh, for Popeyes in India, Bangladesh, Nepal and Bhutan, and also for Dunkin' Donuts in India.

=== Jubilant Industries ===
Jubilant Industries was founded on 23 February 2007 as a private limited company. It was publicly listed on 16 March 2010. It is a specialty chemical company that manufactures agrichemicals, polymers, adhesives and latex.

=== Jubilant Enpro ===
Jubilant Enpro Private Limited (JEPL) was established in 1992. Jubilant Energy, a subsidiary of Jubilant Enpro, was awarded a 10% stake in the KG Deendayal gas discovery block in 2003.

=== Jubilant MotorWorks ===
Jubilant MotorWorks Private Limited was established in 2009. The company is an official dealer and partner for Audi in India. The company is also an official dealer MG Motors India and Porsche India.

=== Jubilant Consumer ===
Jubilant Consumer Private Limited was established in 2013.
