= MaDonal =

Restaurant in Sulaymaniyah, Iraqi Kurdistan

Restaurant information
- Owner: Suleiman Qassab
- Location: Sulaymaniyah, Iraq

MaDonal (Sorani Kurdish: مادۆنال) is a restaurant located in the city of Sulaymaniyah, Iraqi Kurdistan. It is designed to resemble the fast food chain McDonald's both in appearance and in menu; for instance, MaDonal's menu includes "Big Macks." It is one of two McDonald's-like restaurants in the town; the other one, Matbax, claims that MaDonal is "cheap quality".

The owner, Suleiman Qassab, fought in the Kurdish resistance during the 1970s. He became a refugee in Vienna, Austria, where he got a job as a cook at McDonald's. In the 1990s, he applied for permits to create a McDonald's in Iraq, but the McDonald's Corporation turned him down, due to economic sanctions imposed during the regime of Saddam Hussein, as well as the controlled economy of Iraq at the time. In response, he established MaDonal Restaurant, which is still in business. Since establishing MaDonal, Qassab has offered free food to U.S. forces, been threatened, and has become a "Kurdish celebrity." Qassab hopes to one day turn MaDonal into an actual McDonald's restaurant.

MaDonal is popular with Sulaymaniyah's youth, and the upper middle class. It is open even during Ramadan, the month of fasting in Islam.

Sociologist George Ritzer sees MaDonal as part of a trend of other countries developing their own regional variations of McDonald's. Journalist Christopher Hitchens said it was "reassuring" to see signs of progress like MaDonal "in an atmosphere that only a few years ago was heavy with miasmic decay and the reek of poison gas."

Qassab is just one of many who have requested permission to open up a McDonald's in Iraq. Should this happen, there has been speculation by some about whether McDonald's will eventually take legal action against MaDonal. However, MaDonal appears safe for now, as one journalist notes: "The flow of applications to open an Iraqi McDonald's stopped as quickly as it started, and the corporate lawyers never came to Sulaymaniyah."

== See also ==
- List of hamburger restaurants
- McDonaldization
- Trademark infringement
