= Shobhana Bhartia =

Indian businesswoman (born 1957)

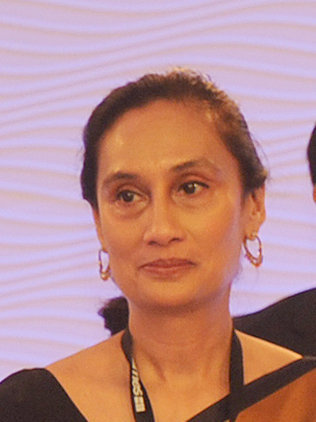
- Bhartia at the Hindustan Times Leadership Summit in 2013
- Born: 4 January 1957 (age 69); Calcutta, West Bengal, India
- Occupation: Business magnate
- Term: 2006–2012
- Political party: Indian National Congress
- Spouse: Shyam Sunder Bhartia
- Father: KK Birla
- Awards: Padma Shri

Member of Parliament, Rajya Sabha
- In office 16 February 2006 – 15 February 2012
- Constituency: Nominated

Shobhana Bhartia (born 4 January 1957) is an Indian businesswoman. She is the chairperson and editorial director of the HT Media, one of India's largest newspapers and media houses, which she inherited from her father. She has also recently taken charge as the Chancellor BITS School of Management and Pro-Chancellor of BITS-Pilani (Birla Institute of Technology and Science, Pilani) which was founded by her grandfather G. D. Birla and is the current chairperson of Endeavor India.

Closely associated with the Congress party, Shobhana served as a nominated member of the Rajya Sabha, the upper chamber of the Indian parliament from 2006 to 2012. In 2016, she was listed as the 93rd most powerful woman in the World by Forbes. She is married to Shyam Sunder Bhartia, co-founder of the Jubilant Bhartia Group.

== Background ==
Born in a Marwari family on 4 January 1957, Bhartia is the daughter of the industrialist and Congress party member KK Birla, and the granddaughter of GD Birla, one of the Birla family patriarchs. The KK Birla family owned a 75.36 per cent stake in HT Media, valued at ₹834 crores in 2004. She grew up in Kolkata and had her schooling at Loreto House. She is a graduate of Calcutta University, and is married to Shyam Sunder Bhartia, Chairman of the ₹1400 crore pharmaceutical firm Jubilant LifeScience Limited (a spinoff from the earlier chemicals venture Vam Organics). Shyam Sunder Bhartia is the son of Late Mohan Lal Bhartia. She has two sons, Priyavrat Bhartiya, born on 4 October 1976 and Shamit Bhartiya, born on 27 April 1979. Their son Shamit Bhartia is also a Director at the HT Media group, and also looks after lifestyle businesses such as the Domino's Pizza franchise and also the convenience store chain Monday to Sunday in Bangalore. In 2013, Shamit Bhartia married Nayantara Kothari, daughter of Bhadrashyam Kothari, a Chennai-based industrialist, and Nina, daughter of Dhirubhai Ambani.

=== Media career ===
Bhartia joined Hindustan Times in 1986, as a 29 year old and directly as Chief Executive. She was the first woman chief executive of a national newspaper and probably one of the youngest. She is considered to be one of the motive forces behind the transformation of the Hindustan Times "into a bright, young paper." She looks after editorial as well as financial aspects, and is credited with raising ₹400 crore through a public equity launch of HT Media in September 2005.

She has received the Global Leader of Tomorrow award from the World Economic Forum (1996). She is also the recipient of the Outstanding Business Woman of the Year, 2001, by the PHD Chamber of Commerce & Industry and the National Press India Award, 1992. In 2005, she received the Entrepreneur of the Year - ICE Category at the EY Entrepreneur of the Year Award, India. She has also won the Business Woman award, The Economic Times Awards for Corporate Excellence awards 2007. She was named one of Forbes Asia's 50 Women in the Mix. She has received the Delhi Women of the Decade Achievers Award 2013 from the ASSOCHAM Ladies League in recognition for her Excellence in Nation Building through Media & Leadership.

== Political career ==
Shobhana was one of the first Padma Shri award nominees in 2005. The award was given for journalism. The following year, in February 2006, Shobhana was nominated to the Rajya Sabha, the upper house of parliament, on a recommendation by the ruling United Progressive Alliance headed by Sonia Gandhi. The nomination, reserved for eminent people from the fields of literature, science, art and social service, was challenged in the Supreme Court of India on the grounds that she was a "media baron" and not a journalist, and that she was politically affiliated with the Indian National Congress. However, the court dismissed the appeal at the admission stage itself, saying that the scope of "social service" was broad enough to include her. She introduced "The Child Marriage (Abolition) and Miscellaneous Provisions Bill, 2006". Among her close friends included BJP politician Arun Jaitley.
