= Master franchise =

Type of franchise relationship

A master franchise is a franchise arrangement in which the owner of the franchise brand (the master franchisor) grants to another party the right to recruit and manage franchisees within a defined geographic area. In return, the master franchisee typically pays a fee and assumes some or all responsibilities for training and supporting franchisees in that region. Because their role resembles that of a franchisor within their territory, master franchisees are sometimes referred to as sub-franchisors. As of 2020, an industry survey of U.S.-based franchisors reported that approximately 20% used master franchising as part of their international expansion strategy. The study found it to be the most common method, alone or combined with multi-unit development, for U.S. franchisors entering foreign markets.

== Business model ==
A franchise system allows a company to distribute its products or services across multiple locations while maintaining brand consistency. It enables the franchisor to achieve efficiencies comparable to those of a large chain, without directly managing each outlet. Although the franchisor delegates day-to-day management to franchisees, it retains oversight of brand standards, operational procedures, and the overall presentation of its businesses across regions.

In a master franchise arrangement, the master franchisor grants the master franchisee (or subfranchisor) the authority to develop and administer franchise operations within a defined territory. Within that area, the subfranchisor performs many of the functions normally undertaken by the franchisor, such as selecting franchisees, providing training, and ensuring compliance with brand requirements. However, the sub-franchisor typically does not own or operate the outlets directly. This additional administrative layer can introduce some local inefficiencies due to duplication of roles, but it often reduces coordination and monitoring challenges at the national or international level. The structure also allows the franchisor to draw upon regional management expertise and local sources of investment.

These combined factors can lead to faster market entry and a higher rate of network expansion. The hierarchical structure allows the franchisor to focus on recruiting, screening, and supporting sub-franchisors, who in turn oversee the development of their respective territories. This division of responsibilities can improve scalability and organisational growth. Other potential advantages include accelerated development timelines, a broader financial foundation, access to local capital, a steadier revenue stream, greater proximity to consumers, and improved responsiveness to local market conditions and competition.

== Drawbacks ==
Despite its advantages, master franchising also presents challenges. Legal complexity and long-term contractual obligations can create difficulties for both parties. Agency costs may increase because it is difficult to monitor compliance across multiple layers of the franchise system. Since not all franchise behaviors can be specified in contracts, there is potential for inconsistent performance among subfranchisors or franchisees. Some studies suggest that new franchise systems using the master franchising model have higher failure rates than those that do not.

== Examples ==
Industries that often use the master franchise model include domestic cleaners, fast food restaurants, computer equipment distribution, real estate agencies, and convenience food stores.
