= New Democratic Party of Prince Edward Island candidates in the 1978 Prince Edward Island provincial election =

The Prince Edward Island New Democratic Party fielded six candidates in the 1978 provincial election, none of whom were elected. Information about these candidates may be found here.

== Candidates ==
=== 4th Kings Assemblyman: Garry Herring ===
Garry Wayne Herring was born and raised in Prince Edward Island. The son of a fisherman, he left school in the tenth grade and moved to Toronto, where he worked in security. He later moved to Oklahoma—where he became a police officer and owned a small restaurant—before returning to Prince Edward Island to work in the lobster fishery. He was a New Democratic Party candidate in the 1978 provincial election and finished third against future premier Pat Binns.

Herring moved to Peterborough, Ontario, in 1995, where he operated a diner and acted as a Christian minister with the small Fisher of Men fellowship. He was elected to the Peterborough City Council in the 2003 election, finishing second in the Otonabee Ward. He was 53 years old at the time. In the same year, Herring was appointed as chair of the social services committee and was reassigned as chair of the city's natural area strategy two months later.

In office, Herring expressed a social conservatism at variance with his former party. He opposed the proclamation of a gay pride day for Peterborough in 2004 and later spoke against safe sex advertisements that he regarded as pornographic. He referenced several passages from the Christian Bible at a council meeting in early 2005, in an unsuccessful attempt to convince other councillors that Peterborough should not sanction same-sex marriages. The journal Peterborough This Week rated him lowest among Peterborough councillors in its 2004 and 2005 report cards. Herring ran for mayor of Peterborough in the 2006 municipal election and finished seventh in a field of eight candidates. He made an unsuccessful attempt to return to council in 2010.

Herring supported Conservative candidate Dean Del Mastro in the 2006 federal election.

Electoral record
| Election | Division | Party | Votes | % | Place | Winner |
|---|---|---|---|---|---|---|
| 1978 provincial | 4th Kings Assemblyman | New Democratic Party | 88 | 3.49 | 3/3 | Pat Binns, Progressive Conservative |
| 2003 Peterborough municipal | Councillor, Otonabee Ward | n/a | 1,685 | 19.94 | 2/7 | Paul Rexe and himself |
| 2006 Peterborough municipal | Mayor | n/a | 721 | 2.90 | 7/8 | Paul Ayotte |
| 2010 Peterborough municipal | Councillor, Town Ward | n/a | 582 | 11.57 | 4/4 | Dean Pappas and Bill Juby |
