= 2006 Peterborough municipal election =

Municipal elections in Canada

The 2006 Peterborough municipal election was held in the city of Peterborough, Ontario, Canada on November 13, 2006. All municipal elections in the province of Ontario are held on the same date; see 2006 Ontario municipal elections for elections in other cities.

The election chose the mayor and city councillors to sit on the Peterborough city council.

== Mayor ==
2006 Peterborough municipal election: Mayor of Peterborough
| Candidate | Votes | % |
|---|---|---|
| Paul Ayotte | 12,095 | 48.60 |
| Linda Slavin | 5,569 | 22.38 |
| Paul Rexe | 2,609 | 10.48 |
| Bill Juby | 1,646 | 6.61 |
| John Pritchard | 1,088 | 4.37 |
| David R. Edgerton | 920 | 3.70 |
| Garry Herring | 721 | 2.90 |
| Gord Vass | 238 | 0.96 |
| Total valid votes | 24,886 | 100.00 |

- John Pritchard was a township representative, deputy reeve, and reeve in Cavan before moving to Peterborough in 1992. After a failed bid for the Peterborough city council in 1997, he was elected for Northcrest Ward in 2000. During the campaign, he supported a controversial parkway extension through municipal green space. After the election, he chaired the transportation committee and continued to promote the parkway. In 2001, he was one of only two councillors to vote against a grant to Showplace Peterborough. He later recommended replacing the city's Memorial Centre with a new building and was the only councillor to vote against a renovation plan. Pritchard also opposed a comprehensive smoking ban. In 2003, he voted against a symbolic motion opposing the American invasion of Iraq. He was defeated in his bid for re-election in 2003. There was some speculation that Pritchard could become the Liberal Party candidate for Peterborough in the 2006 federal election, although nothing came of this. In the 2006 mayoral election, he said that he would work for high-quality jobs in Peterborough.
- Gord Vass was fifty-four years old at the time of the election; he worked for a taxi firm and ran an online distribution company. He reserved the name "Royal Canadian Equity Party" (RCEP) with Elections Ontario in 1999, though he has never registered the party. He has said the RCEP was intended to address issues of the working poor, including fair taxation and an expanded social safety net. He is the brother of city councillor Len Vass. The 2006 mayoral campaign was his first bid for public office.

== Council (partial) ==
2006 Peterborough municipal election: Council, Otonabee Ward (two members elected)
| Candidate | Votes | % |
|---|---|---|
| Doug Peacock | 2,019 | 27.35 |
| Eric Martin | 1,835 | 24.86 |
| Clayton Wade | 1,266 | 17.15 |
| Stephen Morgan | 1,085 | 14.70 |
| Paul Peterson | 500 | 6.77 |
| Fred Chamberlain | 344 | 4.66 |
| Annette Rose Lavine | 333 | 4.51 |
| Total valid votes | 7,382 | 100.00 |

- Doug Peacock (born November 15, 1943) worked in Ontario's education system for thirty-five years. Starting as a teacher in Scarborough, he later became a secondary school principal in Peterborough from 1991 to 2001. He was first elected to the Peterborough city council in 2000, finishing first in the Ashburnham ward. After the election, he chaired the city's newly formed youth committee. He was offered a job with the Ontario Ministry of Education in 2001 to implement changes in the education system, but turned it down. In early 2003, he introduced a symbolic motion that called for Canada to stay out of the American invasion of Iraq. He ran for mayor of Peterborough in 2003 and finished a very close second to incumbent Sylvia Sutherland. During this campaign, he called for a limited tax increase to pay for sewer and road improvements and homeless shelters. He also opposed the construction of a parkway through municipal green space. Following the mayoral contest, Peacock taught at Trent University's School of Education and wrote a column for the Peterborough Examiner. There was a rumour that Peacock would challenge Peter Adams for the Liberal Party nomination in the buildup to the 2004 federal election, although Peacock himself dismissed the possibility; he also declined to stand for the nomination when Adams retired in 2005. In September 2004, he was appointed to the Peterborough Community Social Plan committee. Peacock was re-elected to city council in 2006 for the Otonabee Ward and later served as chair of the mayor's anti-poverty task force. Peterborough This Week rated him among Peterborough's better councillors in its 2007 and 2008 "report cards." He was not a candidate in the 2010 election.
- Paul Peterson was the anticipated Progressive Conservative candidate for Peterborough in the 2000 federal election, but he withdrew from the contest for personal reasons two days before the nomination date. Fifty-two years old at the time, he was president of Craaytech Painted Plastics and a founding president of the Peterborough Safe Communities Coalition. He attended the 2003 Progressive Conservative Party of Canada leadership contest. Initially a supporter of Scott Brison, he shifted his support to Jim Prentice after Brison was forced from the ballot. He later sought the Conservative Party nomination for Peterborough in the leadup to the 2006 federal election. Peterson described himself as a right-wing Conservative in this period, noting his opposition to same-sex marriage. He lost to Dean Del Mastro.

2006 Peterborough municipal election: Council, Ashburnham Ward (two members elected)
| Candidate | Votes | % |
|---|---|---|
| (x)Len Vass | 2,960 | 36.54 |
| Patti S. Peeters | 2,349 | 29.00 |
| Keith Riel | 1,975 | 24.38 |
| Cameron Holmstrom | 816 | 10.07 |
| Total valid votes | 8,100 | 100.00 |

- Cameron Holmstrom was twenty-six years old during the 2006 election and worked as an elementary school French teacher with the Kawartha Pine Ridge District School Board. In declaring his candidacy, he said the council could use some "young blood." During the campaign, he criticized another council candidate (in a different ward) for proposing to jail panhandlers. An individual named Sean Cameron Holmstrom later sought the federal New Democratic Party nomination for Peterborough in the buildup to the 2008 federal election, but lost to Steve Sharpe. It is assumed this is same person. After the 2008 election, Holmstrom worked as an assistant to Member of Parliament John Rafferty.

Election results source: City of Peterborough website
