= 2010 Peterborough municipal election =

The 2010 Peterborough municipal election was held on October 25, 2010, to elect a mayor, city councillors, and school trustees in the city of Peterborough, Ontario, Canada. All other municipalities in Ontario also held elections on the same day. In the mayoral contest, challenger Daryl Bennett defeated one-term incumbent Paul Ayotte.

== Results ==
2010 Peterborough municipal election: Mayor of Peterborough
Candidate	Votes	%
Daryl Bennett	14,061	58.46
(x)Paul Ayotte	9,990	41.54
Total valid votes	24,051	100.00

2010 Peterborough municipal election: Councillor, Otonabee Ward (two members elected)
Candidate	Votes	%
Lesley Parnell	2,994	36.16
Dan McWilliams	2,514	30.36
Gary Baldwin	1,701	20.54
(x)Eric Martin	1,071	12.93
Total valid votes	8,280	100

2010 Peterborough municipal election: Councillor, Monaghan Ward (two members elected)
Candidate	Votes	%
(x)Henry Clarke	4,077	32.07
(x)Jack Doris	3,520	27.69
David R. Edgerton	2,843	22.36
Karen (Rennie) Marshall	2,272	17.87
Total valid votes	12,712	100

- David R. Edgerton was born and raised in Peterborough and has worked as a chartered financial advisor. He is past president of Royal Canadian Legion Branch 52 and for many years worked to create a "Wall of Honour" for Peterborough city and county veterans. Edgerton is also a perennial candidate for public office, having stood in every Peterborough municipal election since 1985. His only success came in 1988, when he was elected as a councillor for the Monaghan Ward. He ran for mayor of Peterborough in the 2006 municipal election on a platform of financial restraint and finished sixth against Paul Ayotte; he was fifty-six years old at the time.

2010 Peterborough municipal election: Councillor, Town Ward (two members elected)
Candidate	Votes	%
(x)Dean Pappas	2,106	41.85
Bill J. Juby	1,273	25.30
Tim Rowat	1,071	21.28
Garry Herring	582	11.57
Total valid votes	5,032	100

- Bill Juby was raised in Peterborough and has worked as a realtor in the city. He was first elected to city council in the 2000, representing the Town Ward. Fifty-three years old at the time, he called for an increased police presence and a binding decision on the city's longstanding plans for a parkway extension through green space. After the election, he chaired the city's renovation committee. He oversaw a comprehensive renovation for the Peterborough Memorial Centre and was criticized when the project went over budget by more than one million dollars. Juby also supported the parkway when council opponents tried to cancel it. In 2003, he opposed a symbolic motion against the American invasion of Iraq. Re-elected in 2003, he was subsequently named as second deputy mayor and chair of the committee of the whole. He supported surveillance cameras for the downtown area, and in early 2006 he established a committee to target illegal drug use. He was a late entry into the 2006 mayoral contest and finished fourth against Paul Ayotte. In 2010, Juby was re-elected as a councillor for the Town Ward; his platform included a call for much of Bethune Street to be made into a linear park.

2010 Peterborough municipal election: Councillor, Ashburnham Ward (two members elected)
Candidate	Votes	%
(x)Len Vass	2,662	29.17
Keith G. Riel	2,102	23.03
Paul Teleki	1,761	19.30
John McNutt	1,318	14.44
(x)Patti S. Peeters	1,283	14.06
Total valid votes	9,126	100

- Len Vass was raised in Peterborough and is a businessman in the city. He finished third in the 1997 mayoral election, centering his campaign on local concerns relating to the opening of a hazardous waste facility. He ran again in 2000 and placed second to incumbent Sylvia Sutherland. Forty years old in his second campaign, he called for more open government and said he was concerned with the quality of employment in the city. He also said that did not belong to any political party and was neither right-wing nor left-wing. In January 2001, he was appointed to the Peterborough Youth Commission. Vass was first elected to city council for Ashburnham Ward in the 2003 election. He was subsequently appointed to chair the city's transportation committee and commissioned a review for Peterborough's Transportation Master Plan. The Peterborough This Week journal, while ambivalent toward Vass's overall record on council, described him as "shin[ing] with his devotion to public transit." In 2004, he was one of two councillors to vote against a rezoning that allowed Wal-Mart to open a new store in the city. He was elected to a second term in 2006 and to a third term in 2010.

2010 Peterborough municipal election: Councillor, Northcrest Ward (two members elected)
Candidate	Votes	%
Andrew Beamer	3,201	32.40
(x)Bob Hall	2,478	25.08
Dave Haacke	2,340	23.68
Rosemary A. Ganley	1,697	17.18
Alex E. Lamore	164	1.66
Total valid votes	9,880	100
