= Liberal Party of Canada candidates in the 2006 Canadian federal election =

The Liberal Party of Canada ran a full slate of 308 candidates in the 2006 federal election, and won 103 seats to form the Official Opposition against a Conservative minority government. The party had previously been in power since 1993.

Many of the party's candidates have their own biography pages. Information about others may be found here.

== Newfoundland and Labrador ==
=== Bill Morrow (Avalon) ===
William G. "Bill" Morrow is a lawyer. For 17 years, he and his wife Judy Morrow have their own practice, Morrow and Morrow in Bay Roberts with his 2 sons Neil and Aaron. He also practised as in-house legal counsel for the Newfoundland and Labrador Hydro Group of Companies. He served as board chair of the Avalon Health Care Institutions Board from 1994 to 2003, and as a volunteer board member with the Provincial Health Care Association. He was defeated in the 2006 election, winning 14,318 votes to Fabian Manning's 19,132.

=== Gerry Byrne (Humber—St. Barbe—Baie Verte) ===
Gerry Byrne has been the incumbent Member of Parliament since a 1996 by-election to succeed Brian Tobin.

== Quebec (incomplete) ==
Riding	Candidate's Name	Notes	Gender	Residence	Occupation	Votes	%	Rank
Argenteuil—Papineau—Mirabel	François-Hugues Liberge	Liberge worked for the youth wing of the Quebec Liberal Party from 1997 to 2000, contested Terrebonne—Blainville as a Liberal candidate in the 2000 federal election, and was an economic affairs assistant to parliamentarian Raymonde Folco in the early 2000s. He was later elected without opposition to a seat on the Commission scolaire de Laval in the 2007 school board elections.	M			7,171	13.42	3rd
Richelieu	Ghislaine Provencher	Provencher was born in 1958 in Saint-Sylvère. A grain and dairy farmer, she has a certificate in administration from the University of Quebec in Trois-Rivières. She was once a member of the Bloc Québécois and was part of a group of Quebec nationalists who joined the Liberals in 2004 to support Canadian prime minister Paul Martin's leadership. She was a Liberal candidate in the 2004 and 2006 elections and supported Michael Ignatieff in the Liberal Party's 2006 leadership contest.	F			6,438	12.98	3rd

== Ontario ==
=== Hamilton Centre: Javid Mirza ===
Mirza received 11,224 votes (23.49%), finishing second against New Democratic Party incumbent David Christopherson.

=== Lanark—Frontenac—Lennox and Addington: Geoff Turner ===
Turner (born in Perth, Ontario) has a degree in political science from Wilfrid Laurier University, and has worked on development projects in India and Southeast Asia. He joined the Liberal Party in 1997,, and was twenty-four years old during the election. Several media reports from the campaign highlighted his energy as a candidate (Kingston Whig-Standard, 2 January 2006).

He received 14,709 votes (24.74%), finishing second against Conservative incumbent Scott Reid.

=== Peterborough: Diane Lloyd ===
Diane Lloyd was born in Peterborough and moved to the nearby rural community of Lakefield as a child. She has a social work certificate from Renison College through the University of Waterloo. She is best known for serving as chair of the Kawartha Pine Ridge District School Board and is a longtime activist with the Liberal Party. In private life, she has been a real estate agent and accounts receivable manager.

Lloyd criticized the policies of Mike Harris's provincial government in 2000, arguing that health and education were more important than tax cuts. She was first elected to the Kawartha-Pine Ridge school board in the 2000 municipal election, defeating three other candidates in a rural division. In 2001, she joined a minority of councillors in opposing a motion that deferred passage of an operating budget with strict cuts imposed by the Harris government. She was defeated in her first bid to chair the board in late 2002, and was re-elected as a trustee over a strong challenge in 2003. She was first chosen as chair of the school board in December 2004.

She won the Peterborough Liberal Party nomination in May 2005, defeating councillor Henry Clarke. In December of the same year, she stood down as chair of the board. Her candidacy was supported by the Peterborough Professional Fire Fighters Association. During the campaign, she indicated her support for same-sex marriage. On election day, she finished a close second to Conservative Party candidate Dean Del Mastro. She was re-elected as a school trustee in 2006 and served again as chair.

Electoral record
Election	Division	Party	Votes	%	Place	Winner
2000 municipal	Kawartha Pine Ridge District School Board, Galway-Cavendish-Harvey, North Kawartha, and Smith-Ennismore-Lakefield	n/a	3,420	34.03	1/4	herself
2003 municipal	Kawartha Pine Ridge District School Board, Galway-Cavendish-Harvey, Smith-Ennismore-Lakefield and Douro-Dummer	n/a	5,883	50.73	1/2	herself
2006 federal	Peterborough	Liberal	20,532	32.37	2/6	Dean Del Mastro, Conservative
2006 municipal	Kawartha Pine Ridge District School Board, Galway-Cavendish-Harvey, Smith-Ennismore-Lakefield and Douro-Dummer	n/a	not listed	not listed	1/2	herself

=== Simcoe—Grey: Elizabeth Kirley ===
Kirley is a lawyer in Tottenham, Ontario. She has a Bachelor of Arts degree in English and a Bachelor of Education degree from the University of Windsor, and a Bachelor of Laws degree from the University of Western Ontario. She has practised criminal, family and children's law for fourteen years in the Simcoe region, and has worked as an assistant Crown Attorney. At the time of the election, Kirley was working toward completion of a Master of Laws degree in international law from Osgoode Hall Law School. She received 18,689 votes (30.86%), finishing second against Conservative incumbent Helena Guergis.

=== Windsor West: Werner Keller ===
Keller (born 1959) holds Bachelor of Applied Science (1981), Master of Business Administration (1987) and Bachelor of Laws (1987) degrees from the University of Windsor. He is an associate partner in the law firm of Sutts, Strosberg, practising in the areas of corporate law, commercial and class action litigation. He is also a Business Law Instructor at the University of Windsor. Before entering law, he worked as a chemical engineer for Union Carbide Canada as a Product Development Specialist in Montreal, Quebec.

He was president of the Windsor West riding association for seven years, and was an organizer for longtime Liberal Member of Parliament (MP) Herb Gray (Windsor Star, 10 and 24 January 2006). Following Gray's retirement in 2001, he co-chaired Dana Howe's unsuccessful bid for the Windsor West Liberal nomination (Star, 16 March 2002).

Keller was forty-six years old in 2006. He received 12,110 votes (25.39%), finishing second against New Democratic Party incumbent Brian Masse.

== Manitoba ==
=== Tanya Parks (Elmwood—Transcona) ===
Parks was born and resides in Winnipeg, Manitoba. She is the owner of Distant Caravans in the Forks Market region, has volunteered for UNICEF and Folklorama, and has produced fashion shows for Winnipeg charities. Parks has been Chair of the Manitoba Liberal Party Women's Association and director of the Manitoba Provincial Liberal Women's Association.

She supported Michael Ignatieff's 2006 bid to become Liberal Party leader, and also endorsed Marie Poulin's bid to become party president.

Electoral record
Election	Division	Party	Votes	%	Place	Winner
2003 provincial	Concordia	Liberal	419	7.22	3/3	Gary Doer, New Democratic Party
2004 federal	Elmwood—Transcona	Liberal	4,923	16.81	3/7	Bill Blaikie, New Democratic Party
2006 federal	Elmwood—Transcona	Liberal	4,108	12.31	3/5	Bill Blaikie, New Democratic Party

=== Garry McLean (Portage—Lisgar) ===
McLean was born on September 22, 1951, at Manitoba's Dog Creek Indian Reserve. He has a Social Services Certificate from Assiniboine Community College in Brandon, and worked a social worker for over twenty years. McLean has been a Band Councillor and General Manager at the Lake Manitoba First Nation, and was once a political advisor to former Manitoba Grand Chief Rod Bushie.

In 1996, he argued that government assistance programs were not adequately addressing the cost of food shipments to northern Manitoba. According to McLean, many northern families on social assistance were unable to pay their monthly food bills and were forced into cycles of debt as a result (Winnipeg Free Press, 15 November 1996). To address the problem, he co-founded the First Nations Buying Group and arranged bulk purchases for isolated First Nations groups across the country. In September 2002, McLean was hired by the Vickar Community Chev Olds car dealership in Winnipeg as a liaison with First Nations consumers (WFP, 7 February 2003).

McLean was one of three aboriginal candidates for the Liberal Party in Manitoba in the 2006 election (Canadian Press, 5 January 2006). He received 4,199 votes (11.39%), finishing a distant second against Conservative incumbent Brian Pallister.

=== Wes Penner (Provencher) ===
Penner received 6,077 votes (15.84%), finishing second against Conservative incumbent Vic Toews.

=== Parmjeet Singh Gill (Winnipeg North) ===
Gill is a prominent member of Winnipeg's Sikh community. He holds Bachelor of Arts and Master of Arts degrees from Panjab University in Chandigarh, Punjab, India. He is the fundraising chairperson for the Manitoba Sikh Cultural and Seniors' Centre, and in 1988 helped to found the Sikh Volunteers Association, which operates blood drives. He also operates a Subway restaurant and small trucking company (WPF, 2 January 2006). He was forty-four years old in 2006.

Gill joined the Liberal Party in 1989, and gave active support to Rey Pagtakhan's election campaigns. He originally supported Allan Rock's abortive efforts to succeed Jean Chrétien as Liberal Party leader, and was elected to the Manitoba Liberal Party's executive vice-presidency in 2001 on a "Rock slate" (Winnipeg Free Press, 2 December 2001). When Rock announced that he would not campaign for the party leadership, Gill declared his support for Paul Martin (WFP, 2 March 2003).

He received 5,752 votes (21.11%) in 2006, finishing second against New Democratic Party incumbent Judy Wasylycia-Leis.

== Alberta ==
=== Mike Swanson (Calgary Southwest) ===
Swanson was raised in Claresholm, Alberta, and received a Bachelor of Laws degree from the University of Alberta in 1982. He has practised law in Edmonton, Calgary and other Alberta communities, and is now a partner in the firm Beaumont Church LLP, working in civil and criminal litigation and agricultural law. He also operates a farm and ranch that his family has owned since 1902. He was forty-eight years old at the time of the election.

Swanson's family has long-standing Liberal roots in Alberta (Globe and Mail, 29 December 2005). He received 6,553 votes (11.41%), finishing second against Conservative Party leader Stephen Harper, who became Prime Minister as a result of that federal election.
