= 2010 Ontario municipal elections =

- October 25, 2010
- Turnout: 44.35% (▲3.02%)

Municipal elections were held in Ontario, Canada, on October 25, 2010. Voters in Ontario elected mayors, councillors, school board trustees and all other elected officials in all of the province's municipalities. A total of 444 elections were held. Several smaller municipalities in Northern Ontario held no council elections, as their entire councils were acclaimed into office, although the towns still saw contested elections for their school board seats.

== Voting date ==
Notwithstanding advance polling arrangements, municipal elections were held on the fourth Monday of October. From 1978 until 2006 the second Monday of November was the fixed date.

== Nomination period ==
Candidate registration opened on January 4, 2010 and ended on September 10.

== Term lengths ==
The Legislative Assembly of Ontario legislation (Bill 81, Schedule H), passed in 2006, sets the length of terms in office for all municipal elected officials at four years.

== Campaigns in major cities ==
The Toronto municipal election saw an open contest for mayor, due to the retirement of David Miller after two terms. In Ottawa, former MPP and Mayor Jim Watson ran against incumbent Larry O'Brien, who was cleared of bribery charges in 2009.

Some media, including a Sudbury Star editorial which was republished in several other Sun Media newspapers, noted the seeming emergence of a Tea Party mentality in some parts of the province, with a number of self-styled "outsider" or populist candidates – including Rob Ford in Toronto, Joe Fontana in London, David D'Intino in St. Catharines, Rob Matheson in Kingston, Ron Schinners in Sault Ste. Marie and Marianne Matichuk in Greater Sudbury – campaigning on platforms that traded heavily in mistrust of the existing municipal governments.

== Single tier municipalities ==
=== Brant County ===
Mayoral Candidate	Vote	%
Ron Eddy (X)	3,187	33.65
Steve Comisky	3,048	32.18
John Weaver	1,695	17.89
Roy Haggart	1,155	12.19
Shawn Pratt	387	4.09

=== Brantford ===
2010 Brantford municipal election: Mayor of Brantford
Candidate	Votes	%
(x)Chris Friel	11,334	41.80
John Sless	5,466	20.16
Mark Littell	3,417	12.60
Dianne M. Austin	3,267	12.05
Mike Quattrociocchi	1,875	6.92
James Calnan	1,068	3.94
Richard E. Casey	495	1.83
Winston C. Ferguson	131	0.48
John Turmel	61	0.22
Total valid votes	27,114	100

=== Chatham-Kent ===
Mayoral Candidate	Vote	%
Randy Hope (X)	13,169	40.87
Tom McGregor	10,956	34.00
Ian McLarty	6,608	20.51
Austin Wright	765	2.37
Mary Kwong Lee	549	1.70
Allan R. Traylor	171	0.53

=== Greater Sudbury ===
Mayoral Candidate	Vote	%
Marianne Matichuk	25,042	46.1
John Rodriguez (X)	19,819	36.5
Ted Callaghan	7,298	13.4
Derek Young	1,432	2.6
Zack Gauthier	390	0.7
Dennis Gorman	167	0.3
Ed Pokonzie	102	0.2
David Popescu	96	0.2
Total valid votes	54,346	

=== Haldimand County ===
Mayoral Candidate	Vote	%
Ken Hewitt	6,984	44.6
Marie Trainer (X)	5,748	36.7
Buck Sloat	2,929	18.7

Summary of the October 25, 2010 Haldimand County Ward Three Councillor Election
Candidate	Popular vote		
Candidate	Votes	%	±%
Craig Grice (incumbent)	1,578	41.43%	n/a
Gary McHale	1,097	28.8%	n/a
Bryan Barker	933	24.5	n/a
Rob Duncan	177	5.27%	n/a
Total Votes	3,809	100%	
Registered Voters	8,090	47.08%	n/a
Note: All Haldimand County Municipal Elections are officially non-partisan. Note: Candidate campaign colours are based on the prominent colour used in campaign items (signs, literature, etc.) and are used as a visual differentiation between candidates.
Sources: Haldimand County Clerk's Office Archived March 4, 2016, at the Wayback Machine

=== Hamilton ===
Mayoral Candidate	Vote	%
Bob Bratina	52,684	37.32
Larry Di Ianni	40,091	28.40
Fred Eisenberger (X)	38,719	27.43
Michael James Baldasaro	2,892	2.05
Tone Marrone	1,052	0.75
Mahesh P. Butani	950	0.67
Glenn Hamilton	949	0.67
Pat Filice	768	0.54
Ken Leach	577	0.41
Andrew Haines	557	0.39
Mark Wozny	433	0.31
Steven Waxman	429	0.30
Edward H. C. Graydon	404	0.29
Gino Speziale	356	0.25
Victor Veri	313	0.22

=== Kawartha Lakes ===
Mayoral Candidate	Vote	%
Ric McGee (X)	13,850	47.78
Andy Letham	12,722	43.88
Lynne Boldt	2,417	8.34

=== Norfolk County ===
Mayoral Candidate	Vote	%
Dennis Travale (X)	11,018	66.24
Clarence Wheaton	5,615	33.76

=== Ottawa ===
Mayoral Candidate	Vote	%
Jim Watson	131,258	48.70
Larry O'Brien (X)	64,853	24.06
Clive Doucet	40,147	14.89
Andrew S. Haydon	18,904	7.01
Mike Maguire	6,617	2.45
Robert Gauthier	1,413	0.52
Jane Scharf	1,169	0.43
Charlie Taylor	1,125	0.42
Cesar Bello	926	0.34
Idris Ben-Tahir	729	0.27
Samuel Wright	371	0.14
Robin Lawrence	300	0.11
Joseph Furtenbacher	299	0.11
Sean Ryan	360	0.13
Julio Pita	265	0.10
Robert Larter	219	0.08
Michael St. Arnaud	200	0.07
Daniel J. Lyrette	166	0.06
Vincent M. Libeshya	122	0.05
Fraser Liscumb	104	0.04

=== Prince Edward County ===
Mayoral Candidate	Vote	%
Peter Mertens	3489	33.18
Sandy Latchford	2327	22.13
Monica Alyea	1828	17.38
Lori Slik	1203	11.44
Gordon Fox	1073	10.20
Paul Boyd	593	564

=== Toronto ===
Mayoral Candidate	Vote	%
Rob Ford	380,201	47.098
George Smitherman	287,393	35.602
Joe Pantalone	94,840	11.749
Rocco Rossi	4,973	0.616
George Babula	3,242	0.402
Rocco Achampong	2,781	0.345
Abdullah-Baquie Ghazi	2,746	0.34
Michael Alexander	2,452	0.304
Vijay Sarma	2,233	0.277
Sarah Thomson	1,876	0.232
Jaime Castillo	1,862	0.231
Dewitt Lee	1,685	0.209
Douglas Campbell	1,420	0.176
Kevin Clarke	1,400	0.173
Joseph Pampena	1,308	0.162
David Epstein	1,198	0.148
Monowar Hossain	1,186	0.147
Michael Flie	1,178	0.146
Don Andrews	1,023	0.127
Weizhen Tang	885	0.11
Daniel Walker	795	0.098
Keith Cole	794	0.098
Michael Brausewetter	791	0.098
Barry Goodhead	736	0.091
Charlene Cottle	730	0.09
Tibor Steinberger	729	0.09
Christopher Ball	690	0.085
James Di Fiore	649	0.08
Diane Devenyi	627	0.078
John Letonja	587	0.073
Himy Syed	576	0.071
Carmen Macklin	565	0.07
Howard Gomberg	472	0.058
David Vallance	442	0.055
Mark State	433	0.054
Phil Taylor	425	0.053
Colin Magee	397	0.049
Selwyn Firth	392	0.049
Ratan Wadhwa	288	0.036
Gerald Derome	249	0.031

== Separated municipalities ==
=== Barrie ===
Mayoral Candidate	Vote	%
Jeff Lehman	13,562	39.2%
Joe Tascona	9,650	27.9%
Rob Hamilton	5,140	14.8%
Mike Ramsay	4,507	13%
David Aspden (X)	1,249	3.6%
Harry Ahmed	304	0.8%
Carl Hauck	115	0.4%
Darren Roskam	68	0.3%

=== Belleville ===
Mayoral Candidate	Vote	%
Neil R. Ellis (X)	10,081	75.09
Mitch Panciuk	2,825	21.17
Lonnie D. Herrington	350	2.62
Graham K. Longhurst	149	1.12

=== Brockville ===
Mayoral Candidate	Vote	%
David L. Henderson (X)	2,718	33.6
Ben Tekamp	2,553	31.6
Louise Severson	2,093	25.8
Robert A. Marleau	393	4.8
Hannelore Walther	328	4.0

=== Gananoque ===
Mayoral Candidate	Vote	%
Erika Demchuk	1,260	68.6
James E. Garrah (X)	577	31.4

=== Guelph ===
Mayoral Candidate	Vote	%
Karen Farbridge (X)	14,902	54.1
David Birtwistle	10,576	38.4
Ray Mitchell	1,182	4.3
Scott Nightingale	878	3.2

=== Kingston ===
Mayoral Candidate	Vote	%
Mark Gerretsen	17,096	56.4
Rob Matheson	6,905	22.8
Barrie Chalmers	5,486	18.1
John Last	377	1.2
Nathaniel Wilson	227	0.8
Kevin Lavalley	215	0.7

=== London ===
Mayoral Candidate	Vote	%
Joe Fontana	48,626	47.2
Anne Marie DeCicco-Best (X)	46,089	44.8
Cynthia Etheridge	4,402	4.3
Eric Southern	644	0.6
Ivan W. Kasiurak	612	0.6
Christopher R. Foerster	462	0.4
Aaron Broughm	427	0.4
Wayne Ford	375	0.4
Zak Young	298	0.3
Stephen Elliott Beckles	252	0.2
Tomasz Winnicki	234	0.2
Dan Lenart	173	0.2
Tom Ha	149	0.1
Ma'in Sinan	128	0.1
Jonas Richard White	83	0.1

=== Orillia ===
Mayoral Candidate	Vote	%
Angelo Orsi	5,398	48.4
Tim Lauer	3,844	34.5
Ralph Cipolla	1,913	17.1

=== Pembroke ===
Mayoral Candidate	Vote	%
Ed Jacyno (X)	2,803	66.7
Stanley E. Sambey	1,398	33.3

=== Peterborough ===
2010 Peterborough municipal election: Mayor of Peterborough
Candidate	Votes	%
Daryl Bennett	14,061	58.46
(x)Paul Ayotte	9,990	41.54
Total valid votes	24,051	100.00

=== Prescott ===
Mayoral Candidate	Vote	%
Brett Todd	913	62.5
Suzanne Dodge (X)	547	37.5

=== Quinte West ===
Mayoral Candidate	Vote	%
John R. Williams (X)	8,159	94.0
Claudor du-Lude	522	6.0

=== Smiths Falls ===
Mayoral Candidate	Vote	%
Dennis Staples (X)	1,925	50.9
Jeffrey G. Keays	1,857	49.1

=== St. Marys ===
Mayoral Candidate	Vote	%
Steve Grose	1,767	62.4
Jamie Hahn (X)	989	34.9
Eric Farquhar	76	2.7

=== St. Thomas ===
Mayoral Candidate	Vote	%
Heather Jackson-Chapman	3,666	37.7
Cliff Barwick (X)	3,158	32.4
Albert Riddell	2,910	29.9

=== Stratford ===
Mayoral Candidate	Vote	%
Dan Mathieson (X)	7,857	79.2
Martin Weatherall	2,061	20.8

=== Windsor ===
Mayoral Candidate	Vote	%
Eddie Francis (X)	39,384	56.2
Rick Limoges	28,354	40.4
Anthony Brothers	979	1.4
Michael Mosgrove	748	1.1
Robert W. Vinson	377	0.5
Sam Sinjari	273	0.4

== In fiction ==
The 2010 first season of the TV sitcom Dan for Mayor takes place during the municipal election in the fictional city of Wessex.

== See also ==
- Canadian electoral calendar, 2010
- Electronic voting in Canada
- Municipal elections in Canada
- 2006 Ontario municipal elections
