= Daryl Bennett =

Canadian politician (born 1948)

Mayor of Peterborough
- In office December 1, 2010 – November 26, 2018
- Preceded by: Paul Ayotte
- Succeeded by: Diane Therrien

Personal details
- Born: May 27, 1948 (age 78) Peterborough, Ontario, Canada
- Party: Independent

Daryl Bennett (born May 27, 1948) is a retired Canadian politician in the Canadian province of Ontario. He was twice-elected as the mayor of Peterborough, having won the position in 2010 and was re-elected in 2014. In October 2018, councillor Diane Therrien defeated him in his bid for a third term.

== Early life and business career ==
Bennett was born in Peterborough and graduated from the Peterborough Collegiate and Vocational School. His father, George Bennett, was a city councillor from 1971 to 1980, and his father-in-law, Keith Brown, was a Progressive Conservative Member of Provincial Parliament (MPP) from 1959 to 1967.

Bennett worked for his father-in-law's businesses after graduating high school, founded Liftlock Coach Lines in 1974, and later established the Liftlock Group of Companies. He chaired the Greater Peterborough Business Development Centre and the Greater Peterborough Community Futures Development Corporation in the 2000s. Bennett was also a founding member of the Market Hall Fund-raising Committee, and in 2003 he was named to a committee that oversaw plans for Peterborough's centennial celebrations.

He served on the board of governors of Trent University from 2000 to 2004, and there was some surprise when his position was not renewed; Bennett has suggested this may have been because of difficult questions he posed to university officials. He organized a campaign for local businesses affected by a major flood in mid-2004 and shortly thereafter was named as person of the year by the Greater Peterborough Chamber of Commerce.

In the 2003 provincial election, Bennett co-chaired the unsuccessful re-election campaign of Progressive Conservative incumbent Gary Stewart. He supported Sylvia Sutherland's re-election as mayor of Peterborough in the same year's municipal election.

== Politician ==
Bennett challenged one-term incumbent mayor Paul Ayotte in the 2010 Peterborough municipal election and won by a significant margin. Bennett's supporters included former MPPs Keith Brown, John Turner, and Gary Stewart, as well as prominent municipal politician Paul Rexe (who died before the election). Ayotte has said that some of his financial backers from 2006 shifted to Bennett's campaign in 2010.

In the 2014 municipal election, Bennett was reelected to a second term as mayor.

In the 2018 municipal election, Bennett was defeated by city councillor Diane Therrien.

Bennett ran for mayor of Cavan Monaghan in the 2022 municipal elections, but lost.

== Electoral record ==
2014 Peterborough municipal election – Mayor of Peterborough
Candidate	Votes	% of vote
Daryl Bennett	11,210	41.4
Maryam Monsef	9,879	36.5
Alan Wilson	4,052	14.9
Patti S. Peeters	1,564	5.8
George "Terry" LeBlanc	202	0.7
Tom Young	183	0.7
Total	27,090	100.0

2010 Peterborough municipal election: Mayor of Peterborough
Candidate	Votes	%
Daryl Bennett	14,061	58.46
(x)Paul Ayotte	9,990	41.54
Total valid votes	24,051	100.00
