= Fred Stenson =

Fred Stenson may refer to:

- Fred Stenson (politician), former Canadian MP for Peterborough
- Fred Stenson (writer), writer of historical fiction from Alberta

== See also ==
- Fred Stinson, a puppeteer; see Cult of Chucky
- Fred C. Stinson (1922–2007), Canadian politician
