= Parmjeet =

Parmjeet is a given name. People with the given name include:

- Parmjeet Gill, Canadian Liberal Party politician
- Parmjeet Kumar, Indian para athlete
- Parmjeet Parmar, New Zealand politician

== See also ==
- Parmjit Singh Gill, British Liberal Democrat politician
- Parmjit Dhanda, British former Labour politician and public affairs executive
