= Bruce Hodgins =

Canadian historian and author (1931–2019)

Bruce W. Hodgins
- Born: January 29, 1931; Kitchener, Ontario
- Died: August 8, 2019 (aged 88); Peterborough, Ontario
- Education: Waterloo College, Queen's University at Kingston, Duke University
- Occupations: Historian, author
- Employer: Trent University
- Organization: Canadian Canoe Museum
- Political party: New Democratic Party
- Awards: Canadian Historical Association's Clio Award for the North (2000)

Bruce W. Hodgins (January 29, 1931 – August 8, 2019) was a Canadian academic historian and author.

He was a co-founder of Trent University's history department, a federal New Democratic Party candidate, and a co-founder of the Canadian Canoe Museum.

He was the author of the 2003 book Blockades and resistance and the co-author of the 1989 book Temagami Experience.

== Early life and education ==
Bruce Hodgins was born on January 29, 1931, in Kitchener, Ontario. His father, Stanley Hodgins, was a school principal and his mother Laura Belle Hodgins (née Turel) was a nurse. He had a younger brother named Larry.

Hodgins studied at Waterloo College and Queen's University at Kingston and had a PhD from Duke University in North Carolina where he attended from 1958.

== Career ==
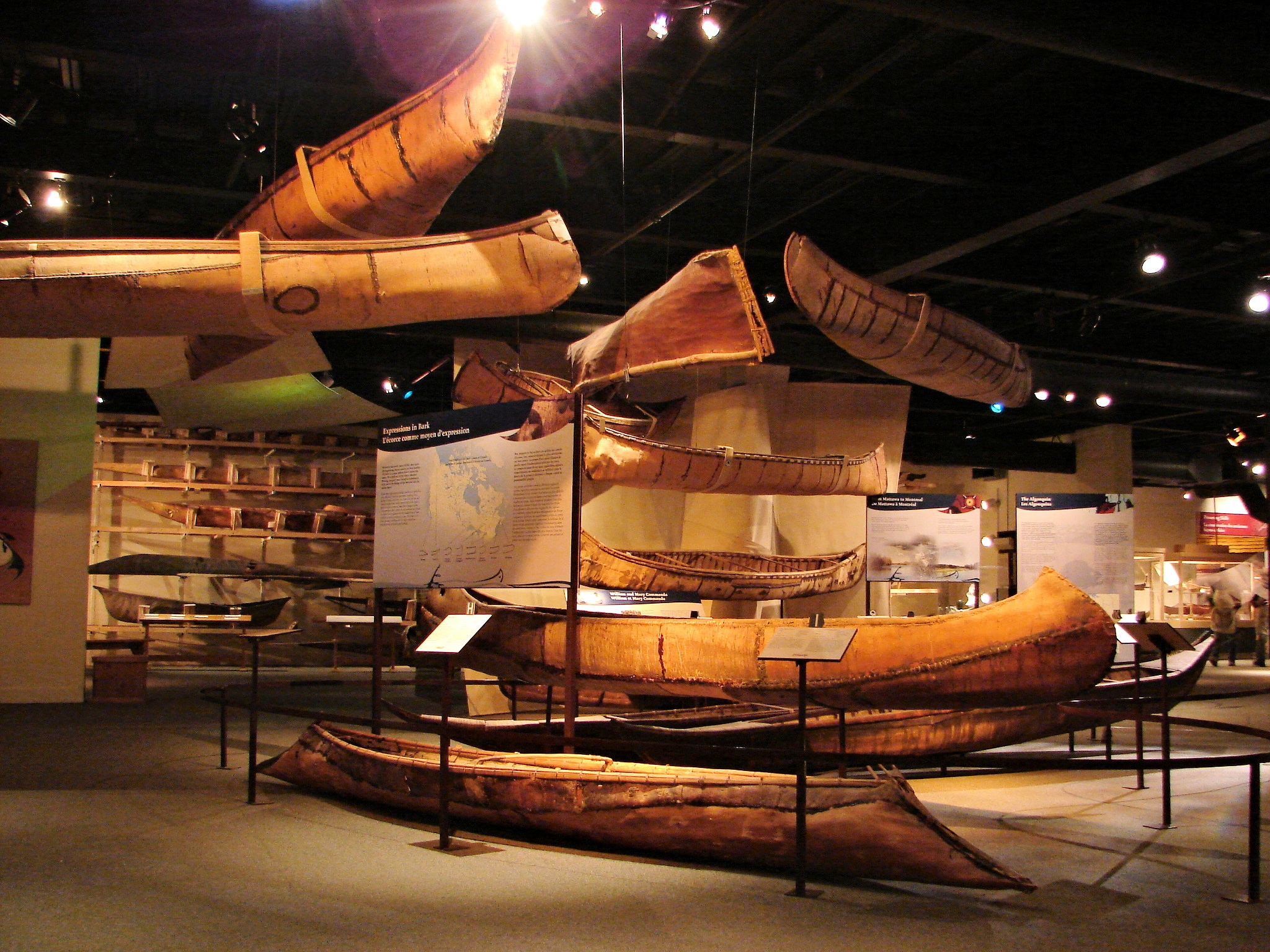
Inside the Canadian Canoe Museum

Hodgins taught Canadian history and worked in the history departments of Prince of Wales College and at the University of Western Ontario as well as with Trent University's Leslie M. Frost Centre for Canadian Heritage and Development Studies. He was a specialist in the study of John Sandfield Macdonald, Temagami, Charles Alfred Marie Paradis [FR], the colonization of Canada, Camp Wanapitei, Canadian federalism, and his home town of Peterborough, Ontario. Along with Alan Wilson, he was a co-founder of Trent University's history department, where he worked as a professor from 1965, being promoted to associate professor in 1967. He retired in 1996.

Hodgins was the chair of the National Administrative Committee for the United Nations Association Canada. With John Jennings, Hodgins was a co-founder of the Canadian Canoe Museum.

Hodgins was the New Democratic Party candidate for Peterborough—Kawartha in the 1968 Canadian federal election, losing to Hugh Faulkner, and remaining an active party member throughout his adult life.

Hodgins won the Canadian Historical Association's Clio Award for the North in 2000.

=== Selected publications ===
- Bruce Hodgins and Jamie Benidickson, Temagami Experience (1989) University of Toronto Press.
- Bruce Hodgins, Blockades and resistance: Studies in actions of peace and the Temagami blockades of 1988-89 (2003) Wilfrid Laurier University Press.
- The Canoe in Canadian Cultures/Bark, Skin and Cedar (1999) Natural Heritage/Natural History (co-editor with John Jennings and Doreen Small).
- Bruce Hodgins, Nastawgan: The Canadian North by Canoe and Snowshoe (1995) Betelgeuse Books
- Changing Parks: The History, Future and Cultural Context of Parks and Heritage Landscapes (1998) (co-editor) Toronto: Natural Heritage/Natural History Inc.

== Personal life ==
Hodgins met Carol, his wife-to-be, in Charlottetown, while working at the Prince of Wales College. They had sons Shawn and Geoff and daughter Gillian Nesbitt. He moved to Peterborough, Ontario in 1965 and lived on Engleburn Place.

Hodgins was a supporter of the Peterborough Historical Society. With other family members, he was a part owner of Camp Wanapitei, purchased in 1956.

Hodgins was one of over 300 people arrested in 1989 for taking part in a protest of a road expansion in Temagami.

== Death ==
Hodgins died on August 8, 2019, at Peterborough Regional Health Centre, aged 88, after what was presumed to be a series of small strokes.

== See also ==
- List of Canadian historians
