= Bill Domm =

Canadian politician

William Henry Domm (July 24, 1930 – January 8, 2000) was a Member of Parliament (MP) in the House of Commons of Canada from 1979 to 1993. He was best known for his crusades against the metric system and in favour of capital punishment.

Domm represented the riding of Peterborough, Ontario, from the 1979 federal election until his defeat in the 1993 election.

Born in St. Catharines, Ontario, Domm was the son of a United Church of Canada minister. He was educated at the Ryerson Institute of Technology and became a radio broadcaster in Peterborough.

Domm's campaign against Metric conversion in Canada was most vocal during the final Pierre Trudeau government of 1980 to 1984. In 1983, he and other Tory MPs illegally pumped gas using Imperial measurements at their "Freedom to Measure" gas station. The station was leased by the MPs in hopes of provoking the government into laying charges and thus allowing a legal challenge to mandatory use of metric. The government ignored the station and it closed after a year. When the Progressive Conservatives formed government following the 1984 federal election, Domm became parliamentary secretary to the Minister of Consumer and Corporate Affairs, the government minister responsible for the metrification program. However, while the Metric Commission was disbanded and rules on enforcing metric were loosened, the "metrification" of the country was not reversed.

Domm's lobbying for the death penalty resulted in a free vote being held in the House of Commons in 1988; however, the motion to restore capital punishment was defeated.

He was more successful in his campaign for the restoration of Via Rail service on the Toronto-Peterborough-Havelock line. Domm also took stands against bilingualism, abortion and gun control voting against his party on several occasions.

== Electoral record ==
1993 Canadian federal election
Party	Candidate	Votes	%	±%
Liberal	Peter Adams	27,575	47.6	+17.3
Reform	Len Bangma	13,460	23.2	
Progressive Conservative	Bill Domm	11,628	20.1	-20.8
New Democratic	Merv Richards	3,072	5.3	-22.2
National	Herb Wiseman	1,858	3.2	
Natural Law	Sandy Callender	368	0.6	
Total valid votes		57,961	100.0	

1988 Canadian federal election
Party	Candidate	Votes	%	±%
Progressive Conservative	Bill Domm	22,492	40.9	-11.8
Liberal	Barry MacDougall	16,693	30.3	+7.5
New Democratic	Gill Sandeman	15,147	27.5	+6.8
Libertarian	Mike Lantz	277	0.5	-2.4
Rhinoceros	C. Fibber mcGee	238	0.4	-0.2
Green	George Kerr	208	0.4	0.0
Total valid votes		55,055	100.0	

1984 Canadian federal election: Peterborough
Party	Candidate	Votes	%	±%
Progressive Conservative	Bill Domm	27,121	52.69	
Liberal	Barry MacDougall	11,737	22.80	
New Democratic	Linda Slavin	10,648	20.69	
Libertarian	John Hayes	1,479	2.87	
Rhinoceros	Washboard Hank Fisher	309	0.60	–
Green	Simon Shields	175	0.34	
Total valid votes		51,469	100.00	
Total rejected ballots		148		
Turnout		51,617	76.52	
Electors on the lists		67,458		

1980 Canadian federal election: Peterborough
Party	Candidate	Votes	%	±%
Progressive Conservative	Bill Domm	19,417	40.25	
Liberal	Sylvia Sutherland	17,202	35.66	
New Democratic	Paul Rexe	10,776	22.34	
Libertarian	Sally Hayes	469	0.97	
Rhinoceros	Mark Elson	243	0.50	–
Independent	Robert J. Norris	69	0.14	
Marxist–Leninist	Richard Anthony	67	0.14	
Total valid votes		48,243	100.00	
Total rejected ballots		116		
Turnout		48,359	73.16	
Electors on the lists		66,097		

Parliament of Canada
Preceded by Hugh Faulkner	Member of Parliament for Peterborough; 1979-1993	Succeeded by Peter Adams

== Archives ==
There is a Bill Domm fonds at Library and Archives Canada. Archival Reference number is R3302 (Former Archival Reference number MG32-C93).

== Sources ==
- Canadian Archival Information Network biography of Domm
- Bill Domm – Parliament of Canada biography
