= Michelle Ferreri =

Canadian politician

Member of Parliament for Peterborough—Kawartha
- In office September 20, 2021 – April 28, 2025
- Preceded by: Maryam Monsef
- Succeeded by: Emma Harrison

Personal details
- Born: May 30, 1979 (age 47) Douro, Ontario, Canada
- Party: Conservative
- Children: 3
- Education: Trent University
- Occupation: Politician; news anchor

Michelle Leahy Ferreri (born May 30, 1979) is a Canadian politician who was the member of Parliament (MP) representing the riding of Peterborough—Kawartha from 2021 until her defeat in the 2025 federal election. A member of the Conservative Party, she served as shadow minister of tourism and families, children, and social development under Erin O'Toole and Pierre Poilievre. Ferreri was a television news anchor and consultant before entering politics.

== Early life and career ==
Ferreri is a graduate of Trent University, where she majored in biology and anthropology, and Loyalist College, where she studied biotechnology.

Ferreri worked as a television news anchor for the local Peterborough television station CHEX-DT from 2003 to 2014. Before entering federal politics, Ferreri described herself on her website as a vlogger, speaker, and a marketing consultant.

== Political career (2021–2025) ==
Ferreri was elected to the House of Commons in the 2021 federal election defeating Liberal cabinet minister Maryam Monsef. After her election, she continued to upload videos talking about politics to her accounts and planned to use her accounts to promote the riding.

In November 2021, Ferreri was appointed by Erin O'Toole as shadow minister of tourism. In October 2022, after new Conservative leader Pierre Poilievre won the party's leadership election, Ferreri was appointed to as shadow minister of families, children and social development.

In December 2021, Ferreri implemented paywall to view her Facebook video uploads. She later apologized after some subscribers spread a March 2020 video in which she drank wine and used expletives as falling below the standard that she wanted to uphold as an elected politician and removed the paywall.

In March 2022, Ferreri faced criticism after stating in the House of Commons that she was "...a single mom with six children". In actual fact, she is a mother of three, and her partner has three children from his prior marriage. She clarified this in the House on March 22.

In December 2023, Ferreri backed an official House of Commons e-petition with 170,000 signatures that called for Prime Minister Justin Trudeau to resign and call a snap election, citing non confidence.

In July 2024, after Ferreri commended Peterborough Police for arresting a man accused of burning a stolen Pride flag while using homophobic slurs and charging him with criminal harassment in a post on X, formerly Twitter, she received dozens of angry social media posts, including some that called her a fake Conservative and being a groomer for her support of the LGBTQ community. In response to one comment criticizing An Act to amend the Canadian Human Rights Act and the Criminal Code (Bill C-16) that falsely equated gay people with pedophilia, Ferreri criticized that position, saying that they were "not pedophiles. Pedophiles are pedophiles, don't lump the radical woke with them."

In August 2024, Ferrerri called on fellow MPs on the status of women committee to recall themselves for an emergency committee meeting after an incident the previous month in which two witnesses left the committee in tears after procedural disputes derailed the hearing. At the time, Ferreri had apologized on behalf of the committee as did Liberal MP Anita Vandenbeld in a later statement.

Later that month, Ferreri deleted a post that claimed that Canada's increased cost of living was causing parents to traffic their kids after a visit to the Kawartha Sexual Assault Centre in Peterborough. She described the post as "inartfully worded". The executive director of KSAC issued a statement saying that parents trafficking their children has been an issue for several decades and the centre did not hold any particular political party or government responsible.

During the 2025 federal election, Ferreri was opposed by a registered third-party campaign group, "No More MP Ferreri". Ferreri was defeated by Liberal candidate Emma Harrison, who won 54.25% of the vote to Ferreri's 41.04%.

== Personal life ==
Ferreri and her husband divorced by 2019. They share three children together. At the time of the 2025 Canadian federal election, she lived in Lakefield, Ontario.

== Electoral record ==
=== Peterborough ===
2025 Canadian federal election: Peterborough
Party	Candidate	Votes	%	±%
Liberal	Emma Harrison	42,890	54.25	+19.43
Conservative	Michelle Ferreri	32,446	41.04	+1.85
New Democratic	Heather Ray	2,406	3.04	–16.12
Green	Jazmine Raine	655	0.83	–1.40
People's	Jami-Leigh McMaster	272	0.34	–3.97
Independent	Chad Jewell	222	0.28	N/A
Christian Heritage	Matthew Grove	168	0.21	N/A
Total valid votes		79,059	99.60	
Total rejected ballots		314	0.40	-0.16
Turnout		79,373	74.10	+5.06
Eligible voters		107,119		
Liberal notional gain from Conservative		Swing		+8.79
Source: Elections Canada

=== Peterborough—Kawartha ===
2021 Canadian federal election: Peterborough—Kawartha
Party	Candidate	Votes	%	±%	Expenditures
Conservative	Michelle Ferreri	27,402	39.03	+4.14	$105,628.34
Liberal	Maryam Monsef	24,664	35.13	–4.12	$115,503.91
New Democratic	Joy Lachica	13,302	18.94	+1.93	$30,208.37
People's	Paul Lawton	3,073	4.38	+3.10	$11,111,91
Green	Chanté White	1,553	2.21	–4.85	$8,788.53
Independent	Robert M. Bowers	218	0.31	+0.05	none listed
Total valid votes		70,212	99.44		
Total rejected ballots		395	0.56		
Turnout		70,607	70.09	+0.09	
Eligible voters		100,735			
Conservative gain from Liberal		Swing		+4.13	
Source: Elections Canada
