= Emma Harrison (politician) =

Canadian politician

Emma Harrison MP

Member of Parliament for Peterborough
- Incumbent
- Assumed office April 28, 2025
- Preceded by: Michelle Ferreri

Personal details
- Party: Liberal
- Occupation: Farmer, businessperson, politician

Emma-Lee Harrison Hill is a Canadian politician who was elected to the Canadian House of Commons in the 2025 federal election. She represents Peterborough as a member of the Liberal Party. She defeated incumbent Michelle Ferreri.

At the time of the 2025 Canadian federal election, she lived in Lakefield, Ontario.

== Electoral record ==
2025 Canadian federal election: Peterborough
Party	Candidate	Votes	%	±%	Expenditures
Liberal	Emma Harrison	42,890	54.25	+19.43	
Conservative	Michelle Ferreri	32,446	41.04	+1.85	
New Democratic	Heather Ray	2,406	3.04	–16.12	
Green	Jazmine Raine	655	0.83	–1.40	
People's	Jami-Leigh McMaster	272	0.34	–3.97	
Independent	Chad Jewell	222	0.28	N/A	
Christian Heritage	Matthew Grove	168	0.21	N/A	
Total valid votes/expense limit		79,059	99.71		
Total rejected ballots		314	0.29		
Turnout		79,373	74.33	+3.94	
Eligible voters		106,789			
Liberal notional gain from Conservative		Swing		+8.79	
Source: Elections Canada
