= 2022 Peterborough County municipal elections =

Municipal election in Peterborough County, Ontario, Canada

- October 24, 2022

Elections were held in Peterborough County, Ontario, on October 24, 2022, in conjunction with municipal elections across the province.

== Peterborough County Council ==
Peterborough County Council consists of the mayors and deputy mayors from each of the county's constituent municipalities.

Position	Elected
Asphodel-Norwood Mayor	Patrick Wilford
Asphodel-Norwood Deputy Mayor	Lori Burtt (acclaimed)
Cavan Monaghan Mayor	Matthew Graham
Cavan Monaghan Deputy Mayor	Ryan Huntley
Douro-Dummer Mayor	Heather Watson
Douro-Dummer Deputy Mayor	Harold Nelson
Havelock-Belmont-Methuen Mayor	Jim Martin
Havelock-Belmont-Methuen Deputy Mayor	Hart Webb (acclaimed)
North Kawartha Mayor	Carolyn Amyotte (acclaimed)
North Kawartha Deputy Mayor	Jim Whelan (acclaimed)
Otonabee-South Monaghan Mayor	Joe Taylor (acclaimed)
Otonabee-South Monaghan Deputy Mayor	Bonnie Clark (acclaimed)
Selwyn Mayor	Sherry Senis (acclaimed)
Selwyn Deputy Mayor	Ron Black (acclaimed)
Trent Lakes Mayor	Terry Lambshead
Trent Lakes Deputy Mayor	Carol A. Armstrong

== Asphodel-Norwood ==
The following were the results for mayor and deputy mayor of Asphodel-Norwood.

=== Mayor ===
Mayoral Candidate	Vote	%
Patrick Wilford	813	51.36
Rodger Bonneau (X)	699	44.16
Gregory Bloom	71	4.49

=== Deputy mayor ===
Deputy mayoral candidate	Vote	%
Lori Burtt (X)	Acclaimed	

== Cavan Monaghan ==
The following were the results for mayor and deputy mayor of Cavan Monaghan.

=== Mayor ===
Incumbent mayor Scott McFadden did for re-election. Running to replace him was deputy mayor Matthew Graham and former Peterborough mayor Daryl Bennett.

Mayoral Candidate	Vote	%
Matthew Graham	2,120	60.24
Daryl Bennett	1,399	39.76

=== Deputy mayor ===
Deputy mayoral candidate	Vote	%
Ryan Huntley	2,001	57.42
Dean Del Mastro	1,484	42.58

== Douro-Dummer ==
The following were the results for mayor and deputy mayor of Douro-Dummer.

=== Mayor ===
Douro Ward councillor Heather Watson ran against businessman Jim Coyle.

Mayoral Candidate	Vote	%
Heather Watson	1,501	57.18
Jim Coyle	1,124	42.82

=== Deputy mayor ===
Deputy mayoral candidate	Vote	%
Harold Nelson	1,499	59.74
Marc Trudeau	1,010	40.26

== Havelock-Belmont-Methuen ==
The following were the results for mayor and deputy mayor of Havelock-Belmont-Methuen.

=== Mayor ===
Incumbent mayor Jim Martin was challenged by former firefighter Rolf Joss.

Mayoral Candidate	Vote	%
Jim Martin (X)	1,640	76.85
Rolf Joss	494	23.15

=== Deputy mayor ===
Deputy mayoral candidate	Vote	%
Hart Webb	Acclaimed	

== North Kawartha ==
The following candidates are running for mayor and deputy mayor of North Kawartha.

=== Mayor ===
Mayoral Candidate	Vote	%
Carolyn Amyotte (X)	Acclaimed	

=== Deputy mayor ===
Deputy mayoral candidate	Vote	%
Jim Whelan (X)	Acclaimed	

== Otonabee-South Monaghan ==
Incumbent mayor Joe Taylor and deputy mayor Bonnie Clark have been re-elected by acclamation.

=== Mayor ===
Mayoral Candidate	Vote	%
Joe Taylor (X)	Acclaimed	

=== Deputy mayor ===
Deputy mayoral candidate	Vote	%
Bonnie Clark (X)	Acclaimed	

== Selwyn ==
The following candidates are running for mayor and deputy mayor of Selwyn.

=== Mayor ===
Mayor Andy Mitchell has announced he will not be running for re-election. Only deputy mayor Sherry Senis has announced they will be running for mayor so far.

Mayoral Candidate	Vote	%
Sherry Senis	Acclaimed	

=== Deputy mayor ===
Deputy mayoral candidate	Vote	%
Ron Black	Acclaimed	

== Trent Lakes ==
The following were the results for mayor and deputy mayor of Trent Lakes.

=== Mayor ===
Mayoral Candidate	Vote	%
Terry Lambshead	1,940	63.34
Bev Matthews	1,123	36.66

=== Deputy mayor ===
Deputy mayoral candidate	Vote	%
Carol A. Armstrong	1,772	59.07
Ed Dewhurst	740	24.67
Gerry Forestell	488	16.27
