= Maryam Monsef =

Canadian politician (born 1984)

The Honourable Maryam Monsef PC
- مریم منصف
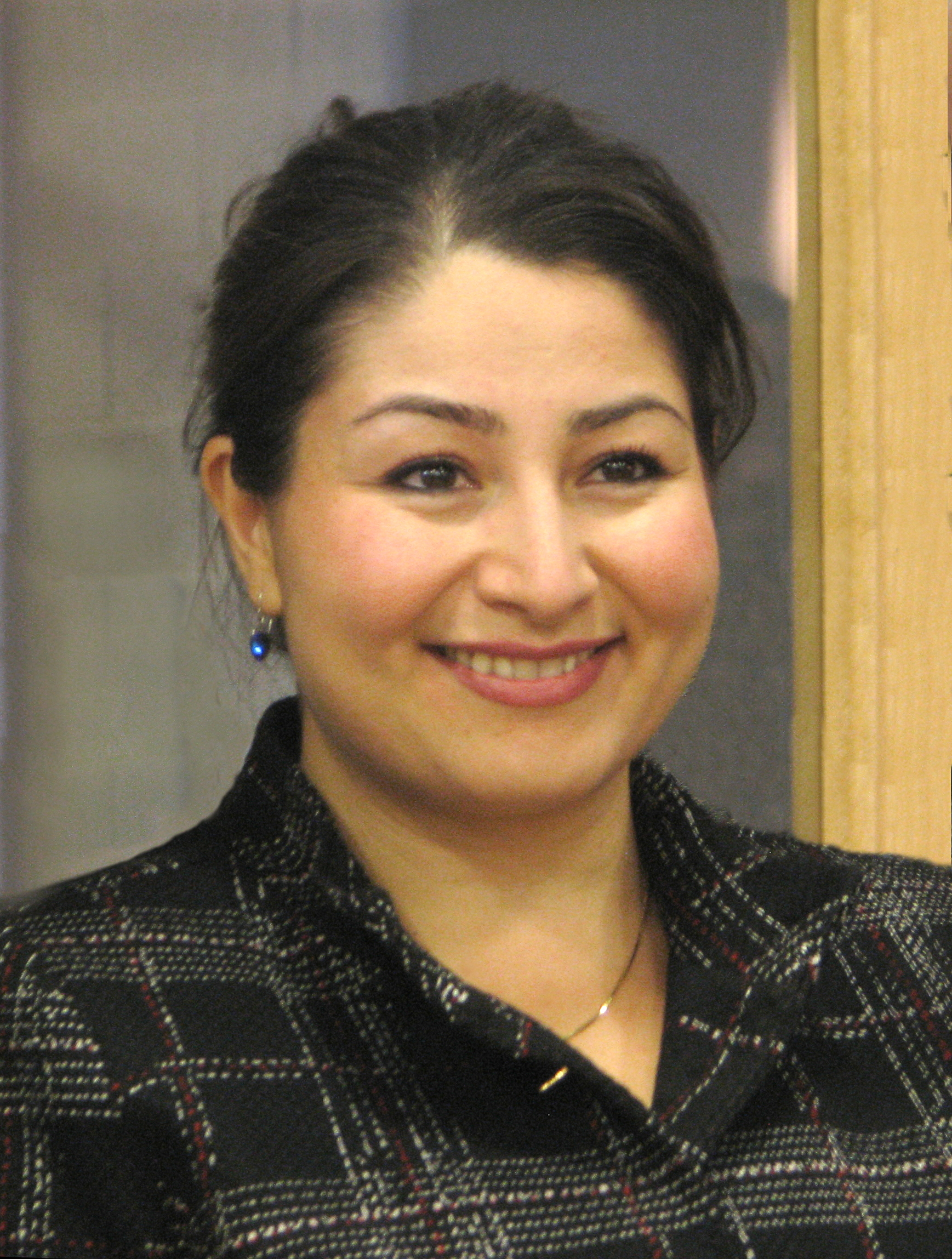
- Monsef in 2016

Minister for Women and Gender Equality (Note: Office became known as "Minister of Status of Women" from 2017 to 2018.)
- In office January 10, 2017 – October 26, 2021
- Prime Minister: Justin Trudeau
- Preceded by: Patty Hajdu
- Succeeded by: Marci Ien

Minister of Rural Economic Development
- In office November 20, 2019 – October 26, 2021
- Prime Minister: Justin Trudeau
- Preceded by: Bernadette Jordan
- Succeeded by: Gudie Hutchings

Minister of International Development
- In office March 1, 2019 – November 20, 2019
- Prime Minister: Justin Trudeau
- Preceded by: Marie-Claude Bibeau
- Succeeded by: Karina Gould

Minister of Democratic Institutions
- In office November 4, 2015 – February 1, 2017
- Prime Minister: Justin Trudeau
- Preceded by: Pierre Poilievre
- Succeeded by: Karina Gould

President of the Queen's Privy Council for Canada
- In office November 4, 2015 – January 10, 2017
- Prime Minister: Justin Trudeau
- Preceded by: Denis Lebel
- Succeeded by: Karina Gould

Member of Parliament for Peterborough—Kawartha
- In office October 19, 2015 – September 20, 2021
- Preceded by: Dean Del Mastro (2014)
- Succeeded by: Michelle Ferreri

Personal details
- Born: Maryam Monsefzadeh; November 7, 1984 (age 42) Mashhad, Iran
- Party: Liberal
- Children: 1
- Education: Trent University

Maryam Monsef PC (Persian: مریم منصف, born Monsefzadeh; November 7, 1984) is an Afghan Canadian politician. She served as the member of Parliament for the riding of Peterborough—Kawartha from 2015 to 2021 as a member of the Liberal Party of Canada.

A member of the 29th Canadian Ministry, she served as the Minister for Women and Gender Equality from 2017 to 2021, as Minister of Rural Economic Development from 2019 to 2021, and as Minister of International Development in 2019. She also served as Minister of Democratic Institutions and President of the Queen's Privy Council for Canada from 2015 to 2017. Monsef was defeated in her riding in the 2021 federal election.

== Family and education ==
Monsef was born at the Imam Reza Hospital (Note: Part of the Mashhad University of Medical Sciences) in Mashhad, Iran, to Afghan parents who had fled during the Soviet–Afghan War, and lived with her family there in childhood, together with periods in Herat, Afghanistan, in 1987–1988 and 1993–1996. Because Iran and Afghanistan (before 2000) followed the principle of jus sanguinis in their respective nationality laws, Monsef was born an Afghan citizen. Her father was killed on the Iran–Afghanistan border while travelling in 1988, although it is unknown whether he was killed by bandits or Soviet troops. Her uncle had, years earlier, vanished along with several roommates while attending the University of Kabul, in circumstances suggested to have been connected to anti-communist political activity. The family struggled in Iran because of low economic and social prospects for Afghan migrants, even though they had legal status as "involuntary migrants" (mohajerin) under Iranian rules in effect prior to 1992. (Note: subsequently subject to progressive tightening, until replaced by the Amayesh registration scheme in 2003) In 1996, during their second return to Herat, her mother opted to move the family to Canada, and the resulting journey involved travelling through Iran, Pakistan, and Jordan.

Upon arrival, the family took up residence in Peterborough, where Monsef's uncle already lived. They relied on the support of several charity organizations, including the YMCA and the Salvation Army. Monsef has continued to raise money for humanitarian activities in Afghanistan.

In 2003, Monsef enrolled at Trent University, from which she graduated in 2010 with a Bachelor of Science in biology and psychology. After graduation, from 2011 to 2014, she worked in several public sector positions in the Peterborough area. (Note: Immigration Portal Researcher for WelcomePeterborough.ca; Outreach Coordinator for the New Canadians Centre; Outreach Coordinator for the Community Foundation of Greater Peterborough; Community Communications Consultant for the Peterborough Economic Development Commission; and Coordinator of Diversity & International Student Supports/ Community Engagement & Stewardship Officer at Fleming College.)

In 2019, she announced her engagement to former Liberal member of Parliament Matt DeCourcey.

Monsef holds dual citizenship with Afghanistan.

== Political career ==
In 2014, Monsef was offered a job in Afghanistan but was unable to enter the country because of security concerns. She then went to Iran to work on relief efforts for Afghan refugees, which encouraged her to focus on political endeavours.

=== Municipal politics ===
When Monsef returned to Canada, she ran for Mayor of Peterborough in 2014, finishing a close second.

=== Federal politics ===
Later that same year, she was nominated as the Liberal Party candidate for the 2015 federal election. She was elected on October 19, 2015, with 43.8% of the vote.

==== Cabinet appointments ====
Monsef was appointed as Minister of Democratic Institutions in Justin Trudeau's Cabinet on November 4, 2015. She has variously been referred to as the second- or fourth-youngest minister ever appointed to the Cabinet. According to The Hill Times, Monsef was named President of the Queen's Privy Council in Canada although it was unclear at the time whether she had been sworn into that office. Monsef has described this position as "largely ceremonial." The Parliamentary website subsequently indicated that she had assumed the position on November 4.

On January 10, 2017, Monsef was sworn in as Minister for Women and Gender Equality (previously known as the Minister of Status of Women). On March 1, 2019, she was appointed Minister of International Development. She was sworn in as Minister of Rural Economic Development on November 20, 2019.

=== Criticism and controversy ===
==== Handling of portfolio ====
On May 10, 2016, Monsef gave notice in the House of Commons of the government's plans for the composition of the Special Committee on Electoral Reform, which was to have ten members—six members of the Liberal Party, three members from the Conservative Party, and one member from the New Democratic Party. This attracted immediate controversy, as the government possessed a majority of the committee seats and thus could theoretically recommend alterations to the electoral system without the support of any other party. As well, the Green Party and the Bloc Québécois objected to their lack of voting representation on the committee, although they were invited to attend meetings.

On June 2, 2016, the Liberal government reversed course, and both Trudeau and Monsef advised that they would support Nathan Cullen's motion for the composition of the committee, which would instead have twelve members—five Liberals, three Conservatives, two New Democrats, and one member from each of the Bloc Québécois and the Green Party.

Following the release of the final report of the Electoral Reform Committee Monsef criticized the Members of the committee stating "On the main question on the hard choices that we had asked the committee to make, the members of the committee took a pass," and "We asked the committee to help answer very difficult questions for us. It did not do that." The remarks were considered inaccurate and offensive to the Members of the Committee. Monsef later apologized for her comments.

In late 2016, the Government contracted Vox Pop Labs to create an online survey for Canadians on electoral reform at a website called mydemocracy.ca. The survey was condemned as unscientific and misleading by journalists for allowing unlimited entries from one person and failing to ask direct questions about electoral systems. It was also widely mocked by political observers and electoral reform advocates. Conservative MP Scott Reid and Green Party leader Elizabeth May both claimed the survey looked more like an online dating survey.

In early 2017 Monsef was replaced as Democratic Institutions Minister by Karina Gould and the Liberal campaign promise to replace the first-past-the-post electoral system was not pursued further.

==== Place of birth ====
Monsef has been criticized for stating that she was born in Afghanistan, when in fact she was born in Iran. When this was revealed in September 2016, some commentators pointed out that this could lead to revocation of her Canadian citizenship and potential deportation, while others have criticized the absurdity of the present law or decried the importation of birtherism into Canadian politics. The Trudeau government has regularly revoked citizenship from individuals who had become citizens through fraudulent means – including individuals who came to Canada as children but whose parents had made false claims on their immigration forms. In an interview at that time, former MP Dean Del Mastro said that political workers in the 2014 municipal and 2015 federal campaigns knew she was not born in Afghanistan, but chose not to make an issue of it. Monsef made a request to Immigration, Refugees and Citizenship Canada to update her information.

In October 2016, her office revealed that she had travelled to Iran with pilgrimage visas in an Afghan passport in 2010, 2013 and 2014 in order to visit the Imam Reza shrine in Mashhad. As this type of visa is normally for a single entry to Iran and does not allow a holder to work, her previous admissions that she had crossed over to Afghanistan and back in 2014, together with working with an Iran-based charity at that time, have caught the attention of Iranian authorities. In a 2014 interview in Peterborough, Monsef admitted that she wanted the trip to "remain hush-hush."

==== Open microphone incident ====
In November 2020 Monsef accidentally left her microphone on during a vote in the House of Commons while participating virtually on Zoom. As a result, the camera showed her saying "The question they're going to ask me — how much do I make now? Like 250?" As a cabinet minister, her annual salary at the time was $269,800.00.

Monsef was criticized for the comments as her salary was more than four times the median wage in her riding and yet she was casually discussing her own salary without knowing it to the nearest $20,000. It was unclear what prompted Monsef to make the comment; however, her office later released a statement claiming "Due to a technical error a private conversation was broadcasted."

==== Taliban comments ====
I want to take this opportunity to speak with our brothers, the Taliban. We call on you to ensure the safe and secure passage of any individual in Afghanistan out of the country. We call on you to immediately stop the violence, the genocide, the femicide, the destruction of infrastructure, including heritage buildings

— Maryam Monsef

On August 25, 2021, during a press conference regarding the Taliban overthrow of the Islamic Republic of Afghanistan, Monsef sparked controversy after she referred to Taliban militants as her "brothers" while calling on them to allow safe passage for refugees and stop engaging in genocide and femicide. The Canadian government designates the Taliban as a terrorist organization, which has been responsible for the deaths of 158 Canadian soldiers since 2001. In response to widespread criticism, Monsef stated that Muslims around the world refer to non-family members as brothers and sisters, and that she "believe[s] deeply that the Taliban are a terrorist organization." Many Farsi speakers and Afghans debunked Monsef's premise on the cultural context of calling the Taliban "brothers", and some have even attributed her defeat in 2021 Canadian election to that comment.

=== 2021 election ===
Monsef was defeated in the 2021 federal election.

== Electoral record ==
=== Federal ===
2021 Canadian federal election: Peterborough—Kawartha
Party	Candidate	Votes	%	±%	Expenditures
Conservative	Michelle Ferreri	27,402	39.03	+4.14	$105,628.34
Liberal	Maryam Monsef	24,664	35.13	–4.12	$115,503.91
New Democratic	Joy Lachica	13,302	18.94	+1.93	$30,208.37
People's	Paul Lawton	3,073	4.38	+3.10	$11,111,91
Green	Chanté White	1,553	2.21	–4.85	$8,788.53
Independent	Robert M. Bowers	218	0.31	+0.05	none listed
Total valid votes		70,212	99.44		
Total rejected ballots		395	0.56		
Turnout		70,607	70.09	+0.09	
Eligible voters		100,735			
Conservative gain from Liberal		Swing		+4.13	
Source: Elections Canada

2019 Canadian federal election: Peterborough—Kawartha
Party	Candidate	Votes	%	±%	Expenditures
Liberal	Maryam Monsef	27,400	39.25	-4.57	$99,034.55
Conservative	Michael Skinner	24,357	34.89	-0.17	$97,460.55
New Democratic	Candace Shaw	11,872	17.01	-1.68	none listed
Green	Andrew MacGregor	4,930	7.06	+4.84	none listed
People's	Alexander Murphy	890	1.28		none listed
Independent	Robert M. Bowers	180	0.26		$0.00
Stop Climate Change	Ken Ranney	172	0.25		$1,666.19
Total valid votes/expense limit		69,801	99.36		
Total rejected ballots		448	0.64	+0.35	
Turnout		70,249	70.00	-1.61	
Eligible voters		100,351			
Liberal hold		Swing		-2.20	
Source: Elections Canada

2015 Canadian federal election: Peterborough—Kawartha
Party	Candidate	Votes	%	±%	Expenditures
Liberal	Maryam Monsef	29,159	43.82	+22.42	$153,380.94
Conservative	Michael Skinner	23,335	35.07	-14.60	$160,866.22
New Democratic	Dave Nickle	12,437	18.69	-6.19	–
Green	Doug Mason	1,480	2.22	-1.34	$82.52
Strength in Democracy	Toban Leckie	131	0.20	–	$729.98
Total valid votes/Expense limit		66,542	100.0	–	$232,452.91
Total rejected ballots		190	0.28	-0.01	
Turnout		66,732	73.19	+7.88	
Eligible voters		91,180			
Source: Elections Canada

=== Municipal ===
2014 Peterborough municipal election - Mayor of Peterborough
Candidate	Votes	% of vote
Daryl Bennett	11,210	41.4
Maryam Monsef	9,879	36.5
Alan Wilson	4,052	14.9
Patti S. Peeters	1,564	5.8
George "Terry" LeBlanc	202	0.7
Tom Young	183	0.7
Total	27,090	100.0

== Notes ==
29th Canadian Ministry (2015–2025) – Cabinet of Justin Trudeau
Cabinet posts (5)
Predecessor	Office	Successor
Bernadette Jordan	Minister of Rural Economic Development; November 20, 2019 – October 26, 2021	Gudie Hutchings
Marie-Claude Bibeau	Minister of International Development; March 1, 2019 – November 20, 2019	Karina Gould
Patty Hajdu	Minister for Women and Gender Equality; January 10, 2017 – October 26, 2021	Marci Ien
Denis Lebel	President of the Queen's Privy Council for Canada; November 4, 2015 – January 10, 2017	Karina Gould
Pierre Poilievre	Minister of Democratic Institutions; November 4, 2015 – February 1, 2017	Karina Gould
