= Gary Stewart (politician) =

Canadian politician

The Honourable Gary Stewart ECO

Ontario MPP
- In office June 8, 1995 – October 2, 2003
- Preceded by: Jenny Carter
- Succeeded by: Jeff Leal
- Constituency: Peterborough

Personal details
- Born: March 23, 1938 (age 88) Peterborough, Ontario, Canada
- Party: Progressive Conservative
- Occupation: Business Owner

Richard Gary Stewart (born March 23, 1938) is a former Canadian politician in Ontario. He was a Progressive Conservative member of the Legislative Assembly of Ontario from 1995 to 2003 and briefly served as a cabinet minister under Mike Harris.

== Background ==
Stewart was educated at Banting Institute, receiving a Mortician Certificate, and worked for a time at Comstock Funeral Home in Peterborough. In 1974, he became president of G. Stewart Travel Services in Peterborough, which he continued to operate throughout his political career. He also served as a director of the Peterborough Civic Hospital.

== Politics ==
Stewart became deputy reeve of the Township of Otonabee in 1985 and was a warden of Peterborough County from 1992 to 1994.

He was elected to the Ontario legislature in the provincial election of 1995, defeating Liberal candidate Sylvia Sutherland and incumbent New Democrat Jenny Carter by a significant margin. He was a backbench supporter of Mike Harris for the next four years.

In the provincial election of 1999, Stewart was elected over Liberal Jeff Leal by about 2,500 votes. He served as chief government whip and minister without portfolio from July 31, 2001 to April 14, 2002. When Ernie Eves became premier in 2002, he was dropped from cabinet. In 2003, Stewart recommended that provincial governments stop enforcing the federal gun registry.

In the 2003 provincial election, Stewart lost to Leal by over 6,000 votes in a rematch from 1999.

Gary’s son Scott Stewart lost to Leal in the general election of 2014.

=== Parliamentary positions ===
Harris ministry, Province of Ontario (1995–2002)
Sub-Cabinet Post
| Predecessor | Title | Successor |
|---|---|---|
| | Minister Without Portfolio (2001-2002) | |
Special Parliamentary Responsibilities
| Predecessor | Title | Successor |
| Frank Klees | Chief Government Whip; 2001-2002 | John Baird |

== Electoral record ==
2003 Ontario general election: Peterborough
| Party | Candidate | Votes | % | ±% | Expenditures |
|---|---|---|---|---|---|
| Liberal | Jeff Leal | 24,626 | 44.74 | +4.54 | $59,358 |
| Progressive Conservative | Gary Stewart | 18,418 | 33.46 | −11.53 | $83,317 |
| New Democratic | Dave Nickle | 9,796 | 17.80 | +4.80 | $22,783 |
| Green | Tim Holland | 1,605 | 2.92 | +1.82 | $6,817 |
| Family Coalition | Max Murray | 414 | 0.75 | – | $212 |
| Independent | Bob Bowers | 178 | 0.32 | +0.05 | not listed |
| Total valid votes | | 55,037 | 100.00 | | |
| Rejected, unmarked and declined ballots | | 245 | | | |
| Turnout | | 55,282 | 62.76 | −0.01 | |
| Electors on the lists | | 88,080 | | | |

1999 Ontario general election: Peterborough
| Party | Candidate | Votes | % | ±% | Expenditures |
|---|---|---|---|---|---|
| Progressive Conservative | Gary Stewart | 24,422 | 44.99 | | $66,248 |
| Liberal | Jeff Leal | 21,820 | 40.20 | – | $45,608 |
| New Democratic | Dave Nickle | 7,058 | 13.00 | | $26,105 |
| Green | Larry Tyldsley | 598 | 1.10 | – | $1,651 |
| Independent | Bob Bowers | 151 | 0.28 | | $862 |
| Independent | Kenneth T. Burgess | 125 | 0.23 | | not listed |
| Natural Law | Robert Mayer | 106 | 0.20 | | $0 |
| Total valid votes | | 54,280 | 100.00 | | |
| Rejected, unmarked and declined ballots | | 297 | | | |
| Turnout | | 54,577 | 62.77 | | |
| Electors on the lists | | 86,951 | | | |

1995 Ontario general election: Peterborough
| Party | Candidate | Votes | % | ±% | Expenditures |
|---|---|---|---|---|---|
| Progressive Conservative | Gary Stewart | 22,735 | 52.66 | | $45,102 |
| Liberal | Sylvia Sutherland | 10,326 | 23.92 | – | $42,101 |
| New Democratic | Jenny Carter | 7,581 | 17.56 | | $26,275 |
| Family Coalition | Paul Morgan | 2,064 | 4.78 | – | $12,225 |
| Libertarian | Vic Watts | 251 | 0.58 | | $1,047 |
| Natural Law | Peter Leggat | 213 | 0.49 | | $0 |
| Total valid votes | | 43,170 | 100.00 | | |
| Rejected, unmarked and declined ballots | | 329 | | | |
| Turnout | | 43,499 | 66.23 | | |
| Electors on the lists | | 65,678 | | | |
