= Elizabeth McGregor =

Canadian veterinarian

Elizabeth McGregor CM was a Canadian veterinarian, author, and feminist.

== Early life and career ==
McGregor was born and raised in Peterborough, Ontario. She completed a master’s degree in geography, and graduated as a doctor in veterinary medicine from the Ontario Veterinary College at the University of Guelph in 1987. Previously, McGregor worked for two years in Indonesia with United Nations’ Food and Agricultural Organization, was a federal civil servant with Industry Canada and Agriculture Canada, a former fellow of the Harvard Kennedy School and Harvard Medical School, and founded the World Women’s Veterinary Association.

McGregor ran as the federal Liberal candidate in the riding of Peterborough—Kawartha in the 2008 and 2011 federal elections, but lost to Conservative Dean Del Mastro both times. In 2019, McGregor wrote a book, titled Women on the Ballot: Pathways to Political Power, highlighting Canadian women with diverse backgrounds who entered into politics at all levels.

In 2021, McGregor was appointed as a Member of the Order of Canada for "her promotion of women in science and for her commitment to nurturing Canada’s next generation of leaders."
