= Hugh Faulkner (politician) =

Canadian politician

The Honourable Hugh Faulkner PC
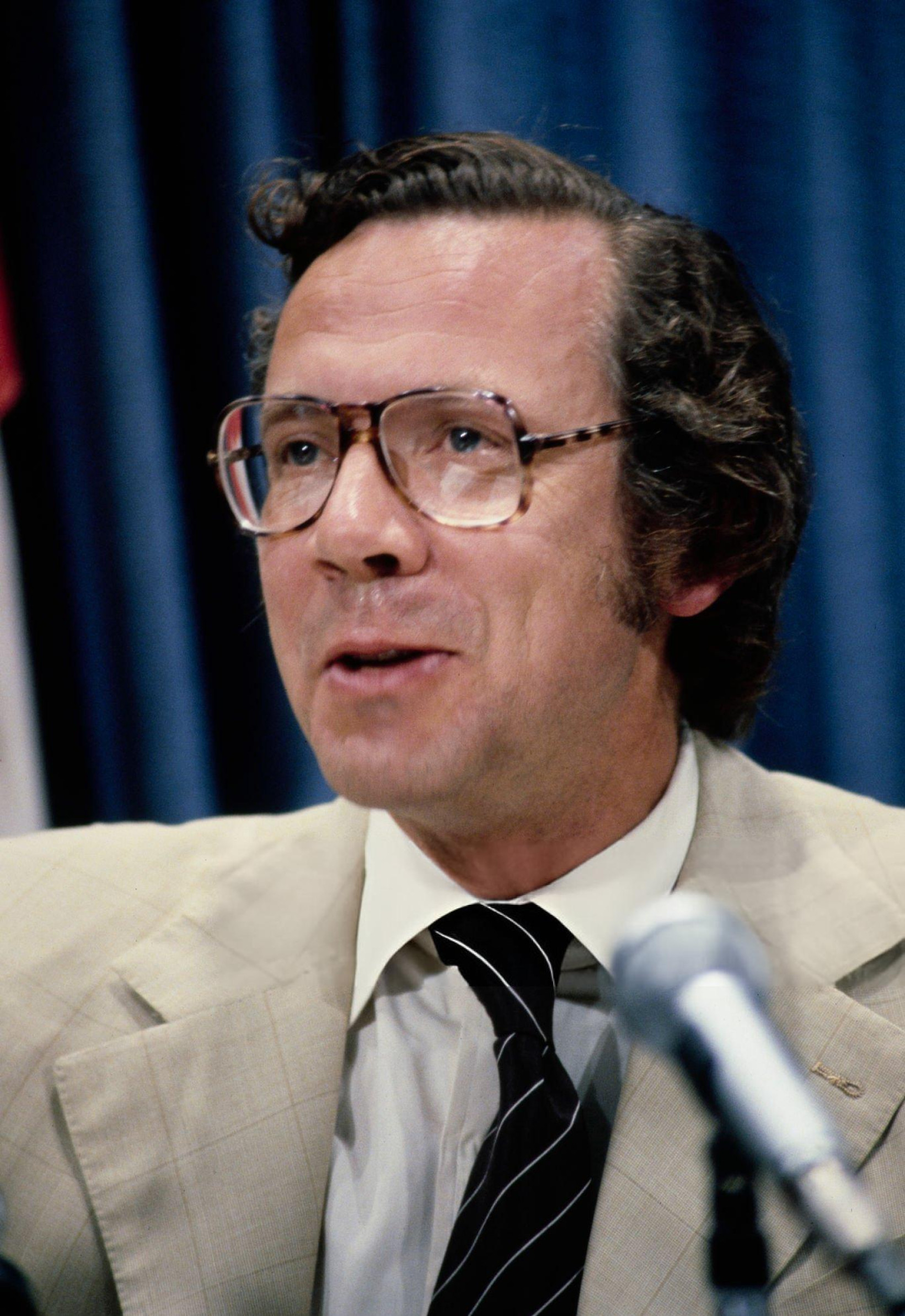
- Faulkner, c. 1979

Minister of Indian Affairs and Northern Development
- In office September 16, 1977 – June 3, 1979
- Prime Minister: Pierre Trudeau
- Preceded by: Warren Allmand
- Succeeded by: Jake Epp

Secretary of State for Canada
- In office November 27, 1972 – September 13, 1976
- Prime Minister: Pierre Trudeau
- Preceded by: Gérard Pelletier
- Succeeded by: John Roberts

Member of Parliament for Peterborough
- In office November 8, 1965 – May 21, 1979
- Preceded by: Fred Stenson
- Succeeded by: Bill Domm

Personal details
- Born: James Hugh Faulkner; March 9, 1933 Montreal, Quebec, Canada
- Died: April 18, 2016 (aged 83) Rougemont, Switzerland
- Party: Liberal
- Spouse: Jane Meintjies (m. 1973)
- Children: 3
- Profession: Teacher; business executive

James Hugh Faulkner PC (March 9, 1933 – April 18, 2016) was a Canadian politician. He completed a BA at McGill University and an MBA at the International Management Institute (IMI) in Geneva, Switzerland.

== Life and career ==
Faulkner was born in Montreal. A businessman by profession, Faulkner entered politics as the Liberal candidate in Peterborough, Ontario in the 1962 federal election. He came in third behind Progressive Conservative candidate Fred Stenson, and incumbent Walter Pitman of the New Democratic Party.

Faulkner again placed third behind Fred Stenson and Pitman in the 1963 federal election before prevailing in the 1965 election. In 1967 he represented Canada at the 22nd UN General Assembly and chaired the labour and employment committee of the House of Commons. He was re-elected in the 1968 election and was appointed Deputy Speaker of the House of Commons of Canada. In 1970, he was made parliamentary secretary to the Secretary of State for Canada.

Following the 1972 election, Faulkner was appointed to the Cabinet of Prime Minister Pierre Trudeau as Secretary of State. Faulkner surprised political observers by handily defeating former Premier of Manitoba Dufferin Roblin who ran in Peterborough as a "star candidate" for the Progressive Conservative Party in the 1974 election.

In 1976, he was appointed to Minister of State for Science and Technology before becoming Minister of Indian Affairs and Northern Development in 1977. Faulkner continued in that position until his defeat in the 1979 election at the hands of Progressive Conservative Bill Domm.

After leaving politics, Faulkner joined Alcan as Vice President. In 1983 he was appointed Managing Director of all Alcan operations in India and Sri Lanka. In 1987 he was appointed President Alcan SA Europe. In 1990 he joined Swiss industrialist Stephan Schmiheiny to form the Business Council for Sustainable Development, Geneva. In 1995 he formed the development NGO Sustainable Project Management to undertake urban infrastructure projects in the developing world. In 1990 he bought the vineyard Domaine de Grand Cros, Provence, France which he and his family operate. He died in Chateau d'Oex, Switzerland after complications from surgery on April 18, 2016.

Parliament of Canada
Preceded by Fred Stenson	Member of Parliament for Peterborough; 1965–1979	Succeeded by Bill Domm
Political offices
Preceded by Herman Maxwell Batten	Deputy Speaker and Chairman of Committees of the Whole of the House of Commons; 1968–1970	Succeeded by Russell Honey
Preceded by Charles Mills Drury	Minister of State for Science and Technology; 1976–1977	Succeeded by J. Judd Buchanan
Preceded by William Warren Allmand	Minister of Indian Affairs and Northern Development; 1977–1979	Succeeded by Arthur Jacob Epp
