= Paul Ayotte =

Canadian politician

Mayor of Peterborough
- In office 2006–2010
- Preceded by: Sylvia Sutherland
- Succeeded by: Daryl Bennett

Member of the Peterborough City Council for Ashburnham Ward
- In office 1978–1985
- In office 1987–2003 Serving with John Duncan (1997–2000) and Doug Peacock (2000–2003)
- Preceded by: Paul Rexe
- Succeeded by: Terry Guiel; Len Vass

Personal details
- Born: Peterborough, Ontario, Canada
- Party: Independent

D. Paul Ayotte is a retired Canadian politician in the Canadian province of Ontario. Formerly a city councillor, he was the mayor of Peterborough from 2006 to 2010.

== Early life and private career ==
Ayotte was born and raised in Peterborough, where members of his family have lived since 1835. He has a certificate in public administration and was a technical writer for General Electric before retiring in 2002. He is a member of the American Institute of Parliamentarians and is known for being very knowledgeable on parliamentary procedure.

Ayotte was diagnosed with multiple sclerosis in the 1981. In a 2003 interview, he said that the disease had been in remission for years.

== Councillor ==
Ayotte first ran for the Peterborough city council in 1978, saying he did not want the only two other candidates in Ashburnham Ward to win without opposition. He finished at the head of the polls and was returned in every subsequent election until 1985. After a two-year break, he returned to council in 1987 and served until his first mayoral run in 2003. He was chair of the city's finance committee for sixteen years, chair of the planning committee for nine years, and deputy mayor for fifteen years. An editorial in the Peterborough Examiner describes him as having focused his attention on city-wide issues, rather than acting as a "parochial ward councillor."

In 2003, he voted against a motion that advised the government of Canada to remain out of the American invasion of Iraq. He was quoted as saying, "I don't think I'm elected to advise the federal government on foreign policy."

== Mayor ==
Ayotte first ran for mayor of Peterborough in the 2003 municipal election. He supported a controversial parkway extension from Clonsilla Avenue to Cumberland Avenue, an area that covered municipal green space. He also called for increased public transportation and greater private sector involvement in affordable housing. Fifty-nine years old at the time, he finished third against incumbent mayor Sylvia Sutherland. After the election, he wrote a series of columns on municipal politics for Peterborough This Week. When flood waters damaged more than three thousand homes in mid-2004, he was appointed to chair the Peterborough Area Flood Relief Committee.

Ayotte was elected mayor on his second attempt in 2006, after Sutherland announced her retirement. As mayor, he has established an Action Committee on Poverty that identified six priority areas for investment, including a day warming room, shelter services for adult women, and reduced transportation fare for people receiving Ontario Works benefits. He also recommended several procedural changes for council meetings in 2008.

Peterborough This Week rated him as the best member of city council in its 2007 annual report card, notwithstanding what it described as his "low-key, cut-and-dry [sic] manner." His 2008 rating was somewhat lower, as the journal noted that some of his key proposals on poverty and procedural reform had not yet been fulfilled. In 2009, Ayotte appeared with federal and provincial representatives to announce more than three million dollars for affordable housing.

Ayotte sought re-election in the 2010 municipal election and lost to local businessman Daryl Bennett. He indicated after the election that some of his financial backers from 2006 had shifted to Bennett's campaign.

== Electoral record (partial) ==
2010 Peterborough municipal election: Mayor of Peterborough
Candidate	Votes	%
Daryl Bennett	14,061	58.46
(x)Paul Ayotte	9,990	41.54
Total valid votes	24,051	100.00

2006 Peterborough municipal election: Mayor of Peterborough
Candidate	Votes	%
Paul Ayotte	12,095	48.60
Linda Slavin	5,569	22.38
Paul Rexe	2,609	10.48
Bill Juby	1,646	6.61
John Pritchard	1,088	4.37
David R. Edgerton	920	3.70
Garry Herring	721	2.90
Gord Vass	238	0.96
Total valid votes	24,886	100.00

2003 Peterborough municipal election: Mayor of Peterborough
Candidate	Votes	%
(x)Sylvia Sutherland	11,194	39.70
Doug Peacock	10,522	37.32
Paul Ayotte	5,155	18.28
Margeree Edwards	1,326	4.70
Total valid votes	28,197	100.00

2000 Peterborough municipal election: Council, Ashburnham Ward (two members elected)
Candidate	Votes	%
Doug Peacock	3,396	39.04
(x)Paul Ayotte	2,955	33.97
(x)John Duncan	2,348	26.99
Total valid votes	8,699	100.00
