= Fred Stenson (politician) =

Canadian politician

Fred Frise Stenson

Member of Parliament for Peterborough
- In office June 1962 – September 1965

Personal details
- Born: 26 July 1914 Peterborough, Ontario
- Died: 5 June 1990 (aged 75) Peterborough, Ontario
- Party: Progressive Conservative
- Profession: Farmer

Fred Frise Stenson (26 July 1914 – 5 June 1990) was a Progressive Conservative party member of the House of Commons of Canada. He was a farmer by career.

He was first elected at the Peterborough riding in the 1962 general election, then re-elected there in 1963. Stenson was defeated in the 1965 election by Hugh Faulkner of the Liberal party.

He died in 1990 in Peterborough.
