= Rosemary Ganley =

Canadian educator, journalist and activist (born 1937)

Rosemary Anne Burns Ganley CM (born 1937) is a Canadian educator, journalist, and activist born in Kirkland Lake, Ontario.

Ganley was a high school teacher by profession prior to her retirement. In the late 1970s, she and her husband John founded the Jamaican Self-Help organization in Peterborough, Ontario, to provide aid in Jamaican communities. In 1995 she was chosen as the representative for Canadian women at the Fourth United Nations Conference on Women in Beijing; she appeared at the Beijing Plus Five Review in 2000 in New York.

Ganley was co-editor of the independent Catholic New Times from 2001 to 2006.

During her career she has led workshops on various topics such as women's issues and justice across cultural boundaries. Among the awards she has received was the 150th Anniversary Medal from the Government of Canada, given to her in 1992. More recently, she has served on the G7's council on issues of gender equality worldwide. Her book Jamaica Journal: The Story Of A Grassroots Canadian Aid Organization was published in 2016. Other books include Positive Community in 2018, Gleanings in 2019, and Groundings in 2021. These last three are collections of her columns in the Peterborough Examiner.

In 2022, Ganley was awarded an honorary Doctorate in Laws from Trent University. She was appointed to the Order of Canada in 2024.
