= Jenny Carter =

Canadian politician (born 1931)

The Honourable Jenny Carter ECO
- Succeeded by: Gary Stewart
- Constituency: Peterborough

Personal details
- Born: December 26, 1931 (age 94) Worcester Park, Surrey, England
- Party: New Democratic
- Spouse(s): Cyril Carter (died 1993), Ken Ranney
- Children: 3
- Occupation: Teacher

Jenny Carter (born December 26, 1931) is a former politician in Ontario, Canada. She was a New Democratic Party member of the Legislative Assembly of Ontario from 1990 to 1995, and served as a cabinet minister in the government of Bob Rae.

== Background ==
Carter obtained a degree in French from the University of London and degrees in English and Canadian Studies from Trent University in Peterborough, Ontario, and a post-graduate certificate from the Institute of Education. She worked as a secondary school teacher before entering political life.

Carter's husband Cyril, who once ran for the federal New Democratic Party, died in 1993. As of 2017, Trent University offers Cyril and Jenny Carter Scholarships in Environmental Studies and Mathematics.

== Politics ==
In the 1990 provincial election, she ran as the NDP candidate in the riding of Peterborough. She defeated Liberal incumbent Peter Adams by 134 votes.

She was appointed to Rae's first cabinet on October 1, 1990, as the provincial Minister of Energy. A self-confessed novice, she said that her husband knew more about the energy sector then she did. Shortly after her appointment, her husband, who was a member of the Peterborough Utilities Commission, resigned his post. He said, "Legally, I have no conflict, but I recognize the public perception of conflict of interest is wider than the strict legal definition of a specific pecuniary interest."

In November 1990, Carter announced that the government was putting a freeze on the construction of nuclear plants. She told Ontario Hydro to divert $240 million earmarked for site preparation for new nuclear plants to instead be used for energy conservation efforts. Carter, who earlier said in a speech to the house that she was an anti-nuclear activist, declared, "We cannot afford to keep building power stations at $25 billion each." She promised to give priority to new hydroelectric and natural gas projects. Rather than a total ban, she said that she would await the outcome of a study of Ontario's energy needs for the next 25 years.

In March 1991, Carter announced that the government would switch heating in public housing projects to gas from electricity. She said, "installing gas heating in new non-profit homes will save 100 megawatts."

In July 1991, Carter was dropped from cabinet. Critics said that she failed to establish herself as energy minister. She was replaced by Will Ferguson. For the remainder of her term, she served as parliamentary assistant to the Minister of Citizenship.

In 1995, Carter lost to Progressive Conservative Gary Stewart in her bid for re-election.

=== Cabinet positions ===
Rae ministry, Province of Ontario (1990–1995)
Cabinet post (1)
| Predecessor | Office | Successor |
| Lyn McLeod | Minister of Energy; 1990–1991 | Will Ferguson |

== After politics ==
Since leaving politics, Carter has contributed occasional articles to the Peterborough Collective and has served on the Peterborough NDP riding association executive. She married climate change activist Ken Ranney, co-founder of the Stop Climate Change political party.
