= 2003 Peterborough municipal election =

The 2003 Peterborough municipal election took place on November 10, 2003, to elect a mayor, councillors, and school trustees in the city of Peterborough, Ontario.

Sylvia Sutherland was narrowly re-elected in the mayoral contest.

== Results ==
=== Mayor ===
2003 Peterborough municipal election: Mayor of Peterborough
Candidate	Votes	%
(x)Sylvia Sutherland	11,194	39.70
Doug Peacock	10,522	37.32
Paul Ayotte	5,155	18.28
Margeree Edwards	1,326	4.70
Total valid votes	28,197	100.00

- Margeree Edwards was raised in the Welland area and attended Cornell University in New York, where she received a Master's Degree in communications and a Ph.D. in education (curriculum and instruction). She also holds a Bachelor of Science degree in nutritional science from the University of Guelph (1964). She taught at Brock University's College of Education before moving to Peterborough in 1979. She moved to Toronto in 1981 to work at the old City of York's health unit; after leaving this employment, she returned to Peterborough in 1989. In 1994, she started a communications company. She has also co-ordinated the Ontario Drug Awareness Partnership, and in 2000 she authored a book entitled First I bought a Paddle: A Beginner's Guide to Canoeing in the Kawarthas. Edwards served on the Peterborough Utilities Commission from 1991 until her first election to city council in 1997. Following this election, she chaired the community funding committee and the transportation committee. She was re-elected in 2000, promising to improve transportation and health care and to revitalize Peterborough with programs celebrating its diversity. She returned to the utilities commission in 2001 as a council representative. In the same year, she worked to establish an effective anti-loitering bylaw. She also supported a grant to Showplace Peterborough, although she unsuccessfully tried to have the grant reduced from forty-five thousand to twenty-five thousand dollars. She opposed a controversial parkway extension through municipal green space. In 2003, she supported a symbolic motion asking Canada to stay out of the American invasion of Iraq. Sixty-two years old in the 2003 mayoral election, she refused to accept donations from Peterborough developers or Ontario numbered companies. During the campaign, she was diagnosed with colon cancer and took time off for surgery and recuperation. This delayed her campaign launch, but she did not withdraw from the contest; her campaign highlighted environmental issues, youth employment, and affordable housing. There was some discussion that Edwards could become the New Democratic Party candidate for Peterborough in the 2004 federal election, but nothing came of this. She later became chair of the group Peterborough Green-Up. In 2008, she was appointed to the council of the College of Midwives of Ontario.

=== Council ===
2003 Peterborough municipal election: Council, Otonabee Ward (two members elected)
Candidate	Votes	%
Paul Rexe	1,832	21.68
Garry Herring	1,685	19.94
Eric Martin	1,425	16.86
Allan Deck	1,321	15.63
Bruce Kendall	1,219	14.42
Ivan Mills	684	8.09
Matthew Vidler	286	3.38
Total valid votes	8,452	100.00

- Allan Deck ran for the Peterborough City Council in the elections of 1997, 2000 and 2003. He finished third in his first campaign and received 1,768 votes (21.02%) for another third-place finish in 2000. A businessman, he was sixty-four years old in 2003 and called for more parkland, lower taxes, and more activities for seniors. He also supported hiring more police officers.

2003 Peterborough municipal election: Council, Monaghan Ward (two members elected)
Candidate	Votes	%
(x)Henry Clarke	4,976	39.07
(x)Jack Doris	4,717	37.04
David R. Edgerton	3,042	23.89
Total valid votes	12,735	100.00

2003 Peterborough municipal election: Council, Town Ward (two members elected)
Candidate	Votes	%
Bernard Cahill	1,645	23.39
(x)Bill Juby	1,633	23.22
George Barron	1,022	14.53
Brent Wood	787	11.19
Eamon Anderson	505	7.18
Bill Weekes	410	5.83
Max Murray	316	4.49
Joe Baptista	233	3.31
Saima A. Shaikh	195	2.77
Tom Young	150	2.13
Justin Wagner	137	1.95
Total valid votes	7,033	100.00

2003 Peterborough municipal election: Council, Ashburnham Ward (two members elected)
Candidate	Votes	%
Terry Guiel	2,566	26.05
Len Vass	1,900	19.29
Murray Batten	1,494	15.17
Keith Riel	959	9.74
Christine Jaros	800	8.12
Bill Casey	788	8.00
Geoffrey Eve	658	6.68
Katherine O'Keefe	566	5.75
Greg Riddle	119	1.21
Total valid votes	9,850	100.00

2003 Peterborough municipal election: Council, Northcrest Ward (two members elected)
Candidate	Votes	%
(x)Bob Hall	2,660	23.56
Shirley Eggleton	2,431	21.53
(x)John Pritchard	2,157	19.11
George Mitchell	2,067	18.31
Dave Haacke	1,800	15.94
Brad Bradamore	174	1.54
Total valid votes	11,289	100.00

== Peterborough County ==
Smith-Ennismore-Lakefield

2003 Smith-Ennismore-Lakefield election, Reeve of Smith-Ennismore-Lakefield
Candidate	Total votes	% of total votes
Ron Millen	accl.	.

2003 Smith-Ennismore-Lakefield election, Deputy Reeve of Smith-Ennismore-Lakefield
Candidate	Total votes	% of total votes
Burritt Mann	3,439	62.29
William T. McLeave	2,082	37.71
Total valid votes	5,521	100.00

2003 Smith-Ennismore-Lakefield election, Councillor, Ennismore
Candidate	Total votes	% of total votes
Donna Ballantyne	accl.	.

2003 Smith-Ennismore-Lakefield election, Councillor, Smith
Candidate	Total votes	% of total votes
(incumbent)Dale Cavanagh	accl.	.

2003 Smith-Ennismore-Lakefield election, Councillor, Lakefield
Candidate	Total votes	% of total votes
(incumbent)Mary Smith	accl.	.
