= Sylvia Sutherland =

Canadian politician

Mayor of Peterborough
- In office 1985–1991
- Preceded by: Robert J. Barker
- Succeeded by: Jack Doris
- In office 1997–2006
- Preceded by: Jack Doris
- Succeeded by: Paul Ayotte

Personal details
- Party: Independent
- Other political affiliations: Liberal (until 1986)
- Profession: Broadcaster

Sylvia Sutherland is a retired Canadian politician who was mayor of Peterborough from 1985 to 1991 and from 1997 to 2006.

Sutherland has a diploma in journalism from the Ryerson Institute of Technology, a BA (Hons) in history from Trent University, and a Post Graduate Certificate in Education from the University of Reading.

She ran as the Liberal candidate against Progressive Conservative MP Bill Domm in the federal election of 1980, losing by 2,215 votes. Sutherland was also a Liberal candidate for Member of Provincial Parliament in the 1995 provincial election. She lost to Progressive Conservative candidate Gary Stewart.

In March 2007, she was appointed to the Ontario Municipal Board for a 5-year term.

On April 5, 2010, Sutherland hit a passenger van, killing the female passenger, Min-Hua Shao. Sutherland was convicted on August 10, 2010, of driving through a stop sign. Sutherland was fined $500, and donated $500 to a charity selected by the victim's family.

== Electoral record ==
2003 Peterborough municipal election: Mayor of Peterborough
Candidate	Votes	%
(x)Sylvia Sutherland	11,194	39.70
Doug Peacock	10,522	37.32
Paul Ayotte	5,155	18.28
Margeree Edwards	1,326	4.70
Total valid votes	28,197	100.00

2000 Peterborough municipal election: Mayor of Peterborough
Candidate	Votes	%
(x)Sylvia Sutherland	15,962	59.21
Len Vass	9,933	36.84
Jeff Ruhl	813	3.02
Kenneth T. Burgess	252	0.93
Total valid votes	26,960	100.00

1995 Ontario general election: Peterborough
Party	Candidate	Votes	%	±%	Expenditures
Progressive Conservative	Gary Stewart	22,735	52.66	+31.45	$45,102
Liberal	Sylvia Sutherland	10,326	23.92	–8.61	$42,101
New Democratic	Jenny Carter	7,581	17.56	–15.42	$26,275
Family Coalition	Paul Morgan	2,064	4.78	–3.94	$12,225
Libertarian	Vic Watts	251	0.58	–	$1,047
Natural Law	Peter Leggat	213	0.49	–	$0
Total valid votes		43,170	99.24		
Total rejected, unmarked and declined ballots		329	0.76	+0.05	
Turnout		43,499	66.23	–0.42	
Eligible voters		65,678			
Progressive Conservative gain from New Democratic		Swing		+23.44	
Source: Elections Ontario

1980 Canadian federal election: Peterborough
Party	Candidate	Votes	%	±%
Progressive Conservative	Bill Domm	19,417	40.25	
Liberal	Sylvia Sutherland	17,202	35.66	
New Democratic	Paul Rexe	10,776	22.34	
Libertarian	Sally Hayes	469	0.97	
Rhinoceros	Mark Elson	243	0.50	–
Independent	Robert J. Norris	69	0.14	
Marxist–Leninist	Richard Anthony	67	0.14	
Total valid votes		48,243	100.00	
Total rejected ballots		116		
Turnout		48,359	73.16	
Electors on the lists		66,097		
