= 1997 Ontario municipal elections =

- November 10, 1997
- Turnout: 40%

The 1997 Ontario municipal elections were led in all municipalities across the Canadian province of Ontario on November 10, 1997, to elect mayors and reeves, councillors, and school trustees. There were also referendum questions in some municipalities.

The most closely watched contest was in the newly amalgamated city of Toronto, where Mel Lastman narrowly defeated Barbara Hall to win the mayoralty. In other results, Hazel McCallion was re-elected in Mississauga, Bob Morrow was returned in Hamilton, and Dianne Haskett was elected in London.

== Elected mayors ==
- Ajax: Steve Parish
- Aurora: Tim Jones
- Barrie: Janice Laking
- Belleville: Ross McDougall
- Brampton: Peter Robertson
- Brantford: Chris Friel (details)
- Burlington: Robert MacIsaac
- Caledon: Carol Seglins
- Cambridge: Jane Brewer
- Chatham-Kent: Bill Erickson
- Clarington: Diane Hamre
- Cornwall: Brian Sylvester
- Cumberland: Brian Coburn (details)
- Flamborough: Ted McMeekin
- Fort Erie: Wayne Redecop
- Georgina: Robert Grossi
- Gloucester: Claudette Cain (details)
- Guelph: Joe Young (details)
- Halton Hills: Marilyn Serjeantson
- Hamilton: Bob Morrow (details)
- Innisfil: Brian Jackson
- Kanata: Merle Nicholds (details)
- Kingston: Gary Bennett
- Kitchener: Carl Zehr
- London: Dianne Haskett
- Markham: Don Cousens
- Milton: Gordon Krantz
- Mississauga: Hazel McCallion
- Nepean: Mary Pitt (details)
- Newmarket: Tom Taylor
- Niagara Falls: Wayne Thomson
- North Bay: Jack Burrows (details)
- Oakville: Ann Mulvale
- Orillia: Ken McCann
- Oshawa: Nancy Diamond
- Ottawa: Jim Watson (details)
- Peterborough: Sylvia Sutherland
- Pickering: Wayne Arthurs
- Quinte West: Jack Arthur
- Richmond Hill: Bill Bell
- Sarnia: Mike Bradley
- Sault Ste. Marie: Steve Butland
- St. Catharines: Tim Rigby (details)
- Stoney Creek: Anne Bain
- Stratford: David Hunt
- St. Thomas: Stephen Peters
- Sudbury: Jim Gordon (details)
- Thunder Bay: Ken Boshcoff
- Timmins: Vic Power
- Toronto: Mel Lastman (details)
- Vaughan: Lorna Jackson
- Waterloo: Joan McKinnon
- Welland: Dick Reuter
- Whitby: Marcel Brunelle
- Windsor: Mike Hurst (details)
- Woodstock: John Geoghegan

== Elected regional chairs ==
- Hamilton–Wentworth: Terry Cooke
- Ottawa–Carleton: Bob Chiarelli (details)
- Sudbury: Peter Wong
- Waterloo: Ken Seiling

== Results ==
=== Lakefield ===
1997 Lakefield election, Reeve of Lakefield
Candidate	Total votes	% of total votes
Bob Helsing	663	89.23
Bill Wellman	80	10.77
Total valid votes	743	100.00

1997 Lakefield election, Deputy Reeve of Lakefield
Candidate	Total votes	% of total votes
Mary Smith	accl.	.

Source: Bill Hodgins, "Battle on for Lakefield pair," Peterborough Examiner, 6 November 2000, B3.
