= Dean Del Mastro =

Canadian politician (born 1970)

Dean A. Del Mastro

Member of Parliament for Peterborough
- In office 2006–2014
- Preceded by: Peter Adams
- Succeeded by: Maryam Monsef

Parliamentary Secretary to the Prime Minister of Canada
- In office 2011–2013
- Succeeded by: Paul Calandra

Personal details
- Born: August 16, 1970 (age 56) Peterborough, Ontario
- Party: Independent Conservative (2013–2014)
- Other political affiliations: Conservative (2006–2013)
- Spouse: Kelly Del Mastro
- Education: Odette School of Business (University of Windsor)
- Profession: Used Car Dealer

Dean A. Del Mastro (born August 16, 1970) is a former Canadian politician. He represented Peterborough in the House of Commons of Canada as a member of the Conservative Party from January 23, 2006 until November 5, 2014. He resigned from parliament after being convicted of breaking the Elections Canada Act during the 2008 election. He had previously served as the parliamentary secretary to the Prime Minister of Canada and the Minister of Intergovernmental Affairs.

== Early life and career ==
Del Mastro was born to an Italian Canadian family in Peterborough, began high school in Lakefield, and graduated from the Adam Scott Collegiate and Vocational Institute. The Del Mastro family founded an automobile dealership that now sells RVs. Del Mastro had been a supporter of the Liberal Party of Canada, but he has said he became disillusioned with the party after the 1993 federal election.

== Political career ==
Del Mastro won the Conservative nomination for Peterborough over six other contenders in May 2005, defeating former party nominee James Jackson by only eight votes on the final ballot. He was elected in the 2006 federal election, narrowly defeating his Liberal Party opponent. The Conservatives won a minority government in this election, and Del Mastro entered parliament as a backbench supporter of Stephen Harper's administration. He was re-elected with an increased majority in the 2008 election, as the Harper government increased its seat total but fell short of a majority.

He was appointed as parliamentary secretary to the minister of Canadian Heritage on November 7, 2008. According to his website, he was also the parliamentary secretary to the minister of Sport. He was the parliamentary secretary to the Prime Minister of Canada and the Minister of Intergovernmental Affairs.

=== Cultural issues ===
After the 2006 election, Harper charged Del Mastro with coordinating the Conservative Party's outreach to Lebanese Canadian voters. Del Mastro planned to participate in a parliamentary delegation to the Middle East organized by the National Council on Canada-Arab Relations in August 2006, during the period of the 2006 Israel-Lebanon conflict. He withdrew from the trip at the last minute, and there are conflicting reports as to the reasons for this decision. Some charge that the Prime Minister's Office pressured him not to participate in a trip that would challenge the government's pro-Israel line, although Del Mastro denied this and cited security concerns.

Del Mastro spoke against a private member's bill introduced by Liberal Member of Parliament Massimo Pacetti in 2010 that called on the government to issue an official apology for the internment of Italian Canadians in World War II. Del Mastro argued that the bill was poorly drafted and could leave the government vulnerable to lawsuits, and said that most Italian Canadians were satisfied with an informal apology issued by Prime Minister Brian Mulroney twenty years earlier. The bill was approved by the House of Commons, without Conservative support.

=== Passenger rail service ===
In 2007, Del Mastro lobbied the Harper government to reopen a passenger train service link from Peterborough to Toronto that was cut by Via Rail seventeen years earlier. He estimated that the track upgrades would cost $150 million and that the service would be used by nine hundred people daily. In February 2008, Finance Minister Jim Flaherty announced that his government would reopen the line. Although locally popular, this plan was widely criticized as impractical, improperly planned, and designed for political gain. Some editorials noted that the line would travel through several Conservative ridings, including Flaherty's own. A 2010 study commissioned by the provincial and federal governments estimated that capital costs for the project would run between $541 million and $1.5 billion. Del Mastro criticized these figures and accused the study's creators of bias, while acknowledging that the project would probably not move forward if assessed solely on the basis of that one report. In 2011, Del Mastro promised that the first passenger train would leave Peterborough on July 1, 2014. It did not.

Del Mastro has also led a non-partisan House of Commons Rail Caucus and has lobbied for a high-speed link connecting Toronto, Montreal, and Ottawa.

=== Social issues ===
Del Mastro is a social conservative. In 2006, he supported an unsuccessful government motion that would have reopened the parliamentary debate on same-sex marriage (which has been legal in Canada since 2005). He has also taken part in anti-abortion rallies on Parliament Hill, including one organized by the Campaign Life Coalition in 2007.

=== Robocall scandal ===
Del Mastro was charged as being responsible for the Conservative response to the Robocall scandal. He has called the robocall scandal "baseless smears." He has asked Elections Canada if it had leaked details around the robocalls. Elections Canada replied such an accusation was smearing Elections Canada by indicating that details of the robocall scandal were purposefully leaked.

=== 2008 election overspending investigation, and 2014 conviction ===
In June 2012 Elections Canada was investigating Del Mastro for overspending during the 2008 elections. The investigation surrounds a payment of $21,000 made by a personal cheque to Ottawa-based polling firm Hollinshed Research Group for which Del Mastro was not reimbursed, exceeding his personal spending limit of $5,000. Del Mastro has insisted he has not broken any election law and claimed that the $21,000 cheque was for a riding-mapping software called GeoVote that Holienshed intended to launch, and not for telephone calls to constituents during the campaign.

In June 2013, Del Mastro, speaking in Parliament and protected from defamation law, accused Frank Hall, a witness in the Elections Canada investigation, of having "concerning details" in his background that required investigation.

Del Mastro was charged by Elections Canada with four breaches of the Elections Canada Act on September 26, 2013. The charges carried a maximum penalty of five years in jail with a $5,000 fine.

On October 31, 2014, Justice Lisa Cameron of the Ontario Court of Justice found Del Mastro guilty of violating the Canada Elections Act by overspending his elections limit and attempting to cover up the violation. As a result of the convictions, Del Mastro resigned in a speech to the House of Commons on November 5, 2014. Del Mastro was scheduled to be sentenced on January 27, 2015.

During the sentencing hearing held on January 27, 2015, Dean Del Mastro's new lawyer argued that the judge should set aside the previous election overspending guilty verdicts. On February 18, 2015, Justice Cameron dismissed Del Mastro's application for a mistrial. He was scheduled to be sentenced on February 19, 2015.

At a hearing on 23 February 2015, prosecution lawyer Tom Lemon stated that Del Mastro's activities "were planned and deliberate and involved a high degree of sophistication". He asked for a sentence of at least nine to twelve months. "Mr. Del Mastro does not seem to get the consequences of his actions—or the seriousness of those actions." On June 25, 2015, Justice Lisa Cameron, calling Del Mastro's crimes an "affront" to Canadian democracy, sentenced him to a month in jail, four months' house arrest, and 18 months' probation. She also banned him from holding any public office while serving his conditional sentence, and from running federally for a period of five years. Del Mastro appealed the conviction. On 13 September 2017, the Ontario Court of Appeal upheld his convictions, dismissing his appeal. Leave to appeal to the Supreme Court of Canada was refused on April 5, 2018.

=== Other ===
Del Mastro was a Conservative representative on the House of Commons Ethics Committee in 2007 and took part in the committee's work on the controversial business dealings between Karlheinz Schreiber and Brian Mulroney.

In 2009, he spoke against a proposal that would have allowed Canada's broadcasters to bill cable and satellite companies for transmitting their signals.

In 2012, Del Mastro claimed in the House of Commons that the Liberal Party used an American telemarketing firm during the 2011 federal election when it was in fact a Canadian company. It was later revealed that his own campaign was one of 14 Conservative Party campaigns to enlist the services of Ohio-based Front Porch Strategies. Del Mastro maintains that none of these activities are tied to the so-called "Robocalls" controversy.

In 2012, veteran CBC parliamentary reporter Kady O'Malley wrote a scathing article accusing Del Mastro of going "in camera" too often thereby contradicting his own party policy of openness and transparency.

While addressing criticism of the digital locks provision within proposed copyright legislation under Bill C-11 (formerly C-32, and C-61 and C-60 before that), Del Mastro compared format-shifting to the act of buying socks from a retailer, only to return later and take a pair of shoes without paying.

On October 28, 2014, in a Facebook posting, he made allegations of sexual blackmail against an unnamed member of the Parliamentary Press Gallery.

=== Provincial politics ===
When John Tory resigned as leader of the Progressive Conservative Party of Ontario in 2009, Del Mastro was briefly rumoured as a candidate to become his successor. Nothing came of this, and he later announced his support for Christine Elliott's candidacy. Elliott is the widow of Del Mastro's former Tory colleague in the House of Commons the former Finance Minister the late Jim Flaherty.

=== Ethics committee ===
In March 2013, New Democratic Party MP Charlie Angus called on Prime Minister Stephen Harper to remove Del Mastro from the Canadian House of Commons Standing Committee on Access to Information, Privacy and Ethics. Del Mastro has missed 26 consecutive meetings since June 2012. Prior to his last meeting in June the Ottawa Citizen revealed Elections Canada was investigating Del Mastro for alleged campaign overspending during his 2008 re-election campaign. Del Mastro's annual salary is $173,565 but does not include extra pay for sitting on the committee.

== Out of politics ==
After his conviction, Del Mastro was sentenced to one month in jail, of which he served the night of June 25, 2015, before being granted bail pending an appeal to be heard in 2016. As part of his sentence he was banned from politics for five years, therefore Del Mastro could not run in the 2015 federal election.

On April 5, 2016, Del Mastro's appeal was dismissed by Ontario Judge Bryan Shaughnessy. Justice Shaughnessy called the former Conservative MP's contravention of election spending limits and deliberate attempts to avoid detection a "grave offence," and ordered Del Mastro to serve the balance of his original sentence.

Del Mastro ran for deputy mayor of Cavan Monaghan in the 2022 municipal elections, but lost.

== Electoral record ==
2011 Canadian federal election: Peterborough
Party	Candidate	Votes	%	±%	Expenditures
Conservative	Dean Del Mastro	29,393	49.67	+2.27	$89,982.35
New Democratic	Dave Nickle	14,723	24.88	+10.96	$44,675.03
Liberal	Betsy McGregor	12,664	21.40	-10.20	$76,896.98
Green	Michael Bell	2,105	3.56	-3.35	$2,858.90
Independent	Gordon Scott	189	0.32	–	$202.50
Canadian Action	Michael Bates	104	0.18	–	none listed
Total valid votes/expense limit		59,178	100.0		$95,207.51
Total rejected ballots		170	0.29	+0.01	
Turnout		59,348	65.31	+1.99	
Eligible voters		90,870	–	–	

2008 Canadian federal election: Peterborough
Party	Candidate	Votes	%	±%	Expenditures
Conservative	Dean Del Mastro	27,630	47.40	+11.50	$111,988
Liberal	Betsy McGregor	18,417	31.60	−0.77	$83,805
New Democratic	Steve Sharpe	8,115	13.92	−11.76	$47,973
Green	Emily Berrigan	4,029	6.91	+1.86	$10,235
Marxist–Leninist	Elaine Couto	98	0.17		none listed
Total valid votes/expense limit		58,289	100.00	–	$92,567
Total rejected ballots		164	0.28	−0.04	
Turnout		58,453	63.32	−6.34	
Electors on the lists		92,317			
Conservative hold		Swing		+11.6	

2006 Canadian federal election: Peterborough
Party	Candidate	Votes	%	±%	Expenditures
Conservative	Dean Del Mastro	22,774	35.90	+3.98	$80,784
Liberal	Diane Lloyd	20,532	32.37	−11.18	$68,799
New Democratic	Linda Slavin	16,286	25.68	+6.67	$61,606
Green	Brent Wood	3,205	5.05	−0.47	$7,949
Marijuana	Aiden Wiechula	455	0.72		none listed
Independent	Bob Bowers	179	0.28		none listed
Total valid votes/expense limit		63,431	100.00	–	$86,008
Total rejected ballots		207	0.33	−0.01	
Turnout		63,638	69.66	+4.47	
Electors on the lists		91,361			
Sources: Official Results, Elections Canada and Financial Returns, Elections Canada.
