= 2000 Peterborough municipal election =

The 2000 Peterborough municipal election was held in the city of Peterborough, Ontario, Canada on November 13, 2000, to choose the mayor and city councillors to sit on the Peterborough city council. Electors in Peterborough also voted for the city's representatives on the regional public and separate school boards.

== Results ==
=== Mayor ===
2000 Peterborough municipal election: Mayor of Peterborough
Candidate	Votes	%
(x)Sylvia Sutherland	15,962	59.21
Len Vass	9,933	36.84
Jeff Ruhl	813	3.02
Kenneth T. Burgess	252	0.93
Total valid votes	26,960	100.00

=== Council ===
2000 Peterborough municipal election: Council, Otonabee Ward (two members elected)
Candidate	Votes	%
(x)Jeff Leal	3,461	41.15
Glenn Pagett	3,182	37.83
Allan Deck	1,768	21.02
Total valid votes	8,411	100.00

- Glenn Pagett was born in Peterborough. He served on the Peterborough city council from 1969 to 1972, from 1974 to 1982, and from 1985 to 1997. In 1997, he was acclaimed to a seat on the Peterborough Utilities Commission. He returned to council for a final term from 2000 to 2003 and served as chair of the public works committee. He worked for General Electric in private life from 1952 to 1996 and was sixty-four years old during the 2000 election. Pagett was one of only two councillors to oppose a bailout grant to Showplace Peterborough in 2001; at the time, he argued that he did not want to pre-commit the budget. He later declined to sign a latter drafted by Mayor Sylvia Sutherland that called on the federal government to stay out of the American invasion of Iraq; he said that the matter was beyond his mandate as a city councillor. He also opposed Sutherland's decision to proclaim a gay pride day in Peterborough in late 2003, and was quoted as saying, "I don't believe in same-sex marriage. [...] Right now, I just don't condone what's happening." Pagett was a long-time council ally and personal friend of Jeff Leal, who served with him in the Otonabee Ward. After Leal was elected to the Legislative Assembly of Ontario in the 2003 provincial election, Pagett worked part-time in Leal's constituency office for a few months. Pagett himself did not seek re-election to council in 2003. He served on a disaster relief committee in 2004, following extensive flooding in the city.

2000 Peterborough municipal election: Council, Ashburnham Ward (two members elected)
Candidate	Votes	%
Doug Peacock	3,396	39.04
(x)Paul Ayotte	2,955	33.97
(x)John Duncan	2,348	26.99
Total valid votes	8,699	100.00

- John Duncan is a former police officer. He was first elected to the Peterborough city council in 1997. In April 2000, he introduced a motion opposing privatized prisons for Ontario. Later in the year, he initiated debate on constructing a baseball diamond in the city's north end. He was defeated in his bid for re-election in 2000 and later worked with the Peterborough Baseball Council.

2000 Peterborough municipal election: Council, Town Ward (two members elected)
Candidate	Votes	%
(x)Margeree Edwards	1,861	28.06
Bill Juby	1,538	23.19
Bill Weekes	901	13.59
Brian Slack	779	11.75
Tony Buell	762	11.49
Philip Oakley	570	8.59
Saima Shaikh	221	3.33
Total valid votes	6,632	100.00

2000 Peterborough municipal election: Council, Monaghan Ward (two members elected)
Candidate	Votes	%
(x)Henry Clarke	4,359	38.15
Jack Doris	4,175	36.54
David R. Edgerton	2,891	25.30
Total valid votes	11,425	100.00

2000 Peterborough municipal election: Council, Northcrest Ward (two members elected)
Candidate	Votes	%
(x)Bob Hall	4,232	42.70
John Pritchard	3,060	30.87
(x)Paul Crough	2,619	26.43
Total valid votes	9,911	100.00

== Peterborough County ==
Smith-Ennismore-Lakefield

2000 Smith-Ennismore-Lakefield election, Reeve of Smith-Ennismore-Lakefield
Candidate	Total votes	% of total votes
Burritt Mann	4,281	66.51
Richard Doyle	2,156	33.49
Total valid votes	6,437	100.00

2000 Smith-Ennismore-Lakefield election, Deputy Reeve of Smith-Ennismore-Lakefield
Candidate	Total votes	% of total votes
Ron Millen	3,688	58.96
Don Boa	1,659	26.52
Ken Dunn	908	14.52
Total valid votes	6,255	100.00

2000 Smith-Ennismore-Lakefield election, Councillor, Ennismore
Candidate	Total votes	% of total votes
Helen Young	accl.	

2000 Smith-Ennismore-Lakefield election, Councillor, Smith
Candidate	Total votes	% of total votes
Dale Cavanagh	1,663	50.12
Don Doughty	1,090	32.85
Derry Wilford	565	17.03
Total valid votes	3,318	100.00

2000 Smith-Ennismore-Lakefield election, Councillor, Lakefield
Candidate	Total votes	% of total votes
Mary Smith	725	54.59
Bob Helsing	603	45.41
Total valid votes	1,328	100.00

Source: Bill Hodgins, "Mann reeve of Smith, Lakefield, Ennismore," Peterborough Examiner, 14 November 2000, B5.
