= Peterborough This Week =

Newspaper in Canada

- Type: Weekly newspaper
- Format: Tabloid
- Owner: Metroland Media
- Publisher: Dana Robbins
- Editor: Marcus Tully
- Founded: 1989
- Headquarters: Peterborough, Ontario, Canada
- Circulation: 48,000

Peterborough This Week is a section of the Peterborough Examiner website. From 1989 to 2023, it was a weekly non subscription-distribution newspaper in Peterborough, Ontario. It is one of three newspapers in the Kawartha Division of Metroland Media, a company that owns newspapers across Ontario.

Staff also produced niche magazines and a variety of online services and provides digital media solutions.

Peterborough This Week had a circulation reaching 48,000 homes and employs 150 people. The current publisher is Dana Robbins, the general manager is Mary Babcock, and the editor-in-chief is Marcus Tully.

Peterborough This Week published a 3D issue on Wednesday, March 31, 2011, thanks in part to local business Kawartha Chrysler Jeep Dodge and their ad campaign.

== Past editors ==
- Editor in Chief - Wendy Gallagher 1994-2002
- Managing Editor - Paul Rellinger (1989–2016)
- Editor in Chief - Lois Tuffin (2003–2018)

== Past sales managers ==
- Chuck McLaren (1989–1992)
- Jennifer Bronsma (1992–1995)
- Gavin Beer (1995–2001)
- Adam Milligan (2002-2015)
- Shane Lockyer (2010-2014)

== Past publishers ==
- Greg Walsh (1989–1990)
- Andy Cook (1990–1993)
- Hugh Nicholson (1993-2001)
- Bruce Danford (2002–2014)
- Mike Mount (2014-2016)
- Peter Bishop (2016-2019)

== See also ==
- List of newspapers in Canada
