= Peterborough (federal electoral district) =

Federal electoral district in Ontario, Canada

Coordinates: 44.462°N 78.185°W

Ontario electoral district
- Interactive map of riding boundaries from the 2025 federal election

Federal electoral district
- Legislature: House of Commons
MP
Emma Harrison
Liberal
- District created: 1953
- First contested: 1953
- Last contested: 2025
- District webpage: profile, map

Demographics
- Population (2011): 115,269
- Electors (2015): 90,352
- Area (km²): 3,473
- Pop. density (per km²): 33.2
- Census division: Peterborough County
- Census subdivision(s): Peterborough, Selwyn, Douro-Dummer, Otonabee–South Monaghan, Trent Lakes (part), Havelock-Belmont-Methuen, Asphodel–Norwood, Curve Lake, Hiawatha

Peterborough (formerly Peterborough—Kawartha) is a federal electoral district in Ontario, Canada, that has been represented in the House of Commons of Canada since 1953.

From 2015 to 2025, the riding was known as Peterborough—Kawartha.

== Geography ==
It now consists of the City of Peterborough and the municipalities of: Douro-Dummer, Havelock-Belmont-Methuen, Selwyn, Otonabee-South Monaghan, Asphodel-Norwood and Hiawatha First Nation plus the Curve Lake First Nation.

== History ==
The riding's borders have differed slightly since its creation in 1953, but has always included most or all of Peterborough County and its county seat of Peterborough, Ontario. Prior to 1952, Peterborough was split into two ridings, one of which was sometimes partly joined to neighbouring Hastings County. Since 1999, the riding boundaries and names of the provincial and federal electoral districts have been identical.

It was created in 1953 from Peterborough West and Hastings—Peterborough. It consisted initially of the city of Peterborough and the townships of Galway, Cavendish, Harvey, Ennismore, Smith, Douro, Otonabee, and North Monaghan. In 1966, the townships of Galway, Cavendish and Harvey were removed from the riding, and the townships of Belmont and Methuen, Dummer, Smith and Asphodel (excluding the Village of Hastings) were added.

In 1976, it was redefined to consist of the part of the County of Peterborough lying south of the Townships of Burleigh and Anstruther, Chandos and Harvey, but excluding the Township of Cavan and the Village of Hastings. In 1987, the Village of Millbrook was excluded, and the Village of Hastings was added to the riding.

In 2003, the Township of North Monaghan was removed from the riding.

In 2013, the riding lost the Townships of Otonabee-South Monaghan, Asphodel-Norwood, and the Hiawatha First Nation, while subsequently gaining the townships of Trent Lakes and North Kawartha.

The riding is a noted bellwether normally held by a member of the governing party of the day. It has only elected an opposition MP at four general elections since its creation—in 1953, 1963, 1980, and 2021. Former MP Dean Del Mastro, who was elected as a member of the Conservative Party of Canada, resigned from the Conservative caucus in 2013. In 2014, Del Mastro was found guilty of falsifying his expense report in the 2008 election, failing to include $21,000 in expenses and spending more than the election spending limit. He resigned his seat on November 5, 2014.

Following the 2022 Canadian federal electoral redistribution, this riding was renamed Peterborough. With a boundary almost identical to 2003, it regained all of the city of Peterborough. Specifically, it gained Otonabee-South Monaghan, Asphodel-Norwood and Hiawatha First Nation from Northumberland—Peterborough South. Meanwhile, it lost Trent Lakes and North Kawartha to Haliburton—Kawartha Lakes.

== Demographics ==
According to the 2021 Canadian census, 2023 representation

Racial groups: 87.7% White, 5.2% Indigenous, 2.2% South Asian, 1.1% Black
Languages: 93.1% English, 1.4% French
Religions: 53.2% Christian (20.5% Catholic, 9.5% United Church, 6.1% Anglican, 1.7% Presbyterian, 1.5% Pentecostal, 1.3% Baptist, 12.6% Other), 1.1% Muslim, 42.7% None
Median income: $38,800 (2020)
Average income: $49,160 (2020)

== Members of Parliament ==
This riding has elected the following members of Parliament:

Parliament	Years	Member	Party
Peterborough; Riding created from Peterborough West and Hastings—Peterborough
22nd	1953–1957	Gordon Fraser	Progressive Conservative
23rd	1957–1958	Gordon Fraser	Progressive Conservative
24th	1958–1960	Gordon Fraser	Progressive Conservative
24th	1960–1961	Walter Pitman	New
24th	1961–1962	Walter Pitman	New Democratic
25th	1962–1963	Fred Stenson	Progressive Conservative
26th	1963–1965	Fred Stenson	Progressive Conservative
27th	1965–1968	Hugh Faulkner	Liberal
28th	1968–1972	Hugh Faulkner	Liberal
29th	1972–1974	Hugh Faulkner	Liberal
30th	1974–1979	Hugh Faulkner	Liberal
31st	1979–1980	Bill Domm	Progressive Conservative
32nd	1980–1984	Bill Domm	Progressive Conservative
33rd	1984–1988	Bill Domm	Progressive Conservative
34th	1988–1993	Bill Domm	Progressive Conservative
35th	1993–1997	Peter Adams	Liberal
36th	1997–2000	Peter Adams	Liberal
37th	2000–2004	Peter Adams	Liberal
38th	2004–2006	Peter Adams	Liberal
39th	2006–2008	Dean Del Mastro	Conservative
40th	2008–2011	Dean Del Mastro	Conservative
41st	2011–2013	Dean Del Mastro	Conservative
41st	2013–2014	Dean Del Mastro	Independent Conservative
Peterborough—Kawartha
42nd	2015–2019	Maryam Monsef	Liberal
43rd	2019–2021	Maryam Monsef	Liberal
44th	2021–2025	Michelle Ferreri	Conservative
Peterborough
45th	2025–present	Emma Harrison	Liberal

== Election results ==
Graph of election results in Peterborough—Kawartha/Peterborough (minor parties that never received 2% of the vote are omitted)

=== Peterborough ===
2025 Canadian federal election
Party	Candidate	Votes	%	±%
Liberal	Emma Harrison	42,890	54.25	+19.43
Conservative	Michelle Ferreri	32,446	41.04	+1.85
New Democratic	Heather Ray	2,406	3.04	–16.12
Green	Jazmine Raine	655	0.83	–1.40
People's	Jami-Leigh McMaster	272	0.34	–3.97
Independent	Chad Jewell	222	0.28	N/A
Christian Heritage	Matthew Grove	168	0.21	N/A
Total valid votes		79,059	99.60	
Total rejected ballots		314	0.40	-0.16
Turnout		79,373	74.10	+5.06
Eligible voters		107,119		
Liberal notional gain from Conservative		Swing		+8.79
Source: Elections Canada

2021 federal election redistributed results
Party	Vote	%
Conservative	28,144	39.19
Liberal	25,008	34.82
New Democratic	13,762	19.16
People's	3,095	4.31
Green	1,603	2.23
Independent	203	0.28
Total valid votes	71,815	99.44
Rejected ballots	403	0.56
Registered voters/ estimated turnout	104,612	69.03

=== Peterborough—Kawartha ===
2021 Canadian federal election: Peterborough—Kawartha
Party	Candidate	Votes	%	±%	Expenditures
Conservative	Michelle Ferreri	27,402	39.03	+4.14	$105,628.34
Liberal	Maryam Monsef	24,664	35.13	–4.12	$115,503.91
New Democratic	Joy Lachica	13,302	18.94	+1.93	$30,208.37
People's	Paul Lawton	3,073	4.38	+3.10	$11,111,91
Green	Chanté White	1,553	2.21	–4.85	$8,788.53
Independent	Robert M. Bowers	218	0.31	+0.05	none listed
Total valid votes		70,212	99.44		
Total rejected ballots		395	0.56		
Turnout		70,607	70.09	+0.09	
Eligible voters		100,735			
Conservative gain from Liberal		Swing		+4.13	
Source: Elections Canada

2019 Canadian federal election: Peterborough—Kawartha
Party	Candidate	Votes	%	±%	Expenditures
Liberal	Maryam Monsef	27,400	39.25	-4.57	$99,034.55
Conservative	Michael Skinner	24,357	34.89	-0.17	$97,460.55
New Democratic	Candace Shaw	11,872	17.01	-1.68	none listed
Green	Andrew MacGregor	4,930	7.06	+4.84	none listed
People's	Alexander Murphy	890	1.28		none listed
Independent	Robert M. Bowers	180	0.26		$0.00
Stop Climate Change	Ken Ranney	172	0.25		$1,666.19
Total valid votes/expense limit		69,801	99.36		
Total rejected ballots		448	0.64	+0.35	
Turnout		70,249	70.00	-1.61	
Eligible voters		100,351			
Liberal hold		Swing		-2.20	
Source: Elections Canada

2015 Canadian federal election
Party	Candidate	Votes	%	±%	Expenditures
Liberal	Maryam Monsef	29,159	43.82	+22.42	$153,380.94
Conservative	Michael Skinner	23,335	35.07	-14.60	$158,210.30
New Democratic	Dave Nickle	12,437	18.69	-6.19	$56,760.61
Green	Doug Mason	1,480	2.22	-1.34	$82.52
Strength in Democracy	Toban Leckie	131	0.20	–	$729.98
Total valid votes/Expense limit		66,542	99.72	–	$232,452.91
Total rejected ballots		190	0.28		
Turnout		66,732	73.61		
Eligible voters		93,190			
Source: Elections Canada

2011 federal election redistributed results
Party	Vote	%
Conservative	28,435	49.55
New Democratic	14,341	24.99
Liberal	12,231	21.32
Green	2,106	3.67
Others	268	0.47

=== Peterborough ===
2011 Canadian federal election: Peterborough
Party	Candidate	Votes	%	±%	Expenditures
Conservative	Dean Del Mastro	29,393	49.67	+2.27	$89,982.35
New Democratic	Dave Nickle	14,723	24.88	+10.96	$44,675.03
Liberal	Betsy McGregor	12,664	21.40	-10.20	$76,896.98
Green	Michael Bell	2,105	3.56	-3.35	$2,858.90
Independent	Gordon Scott	189	0.32	–	$202.50
Canadian Action	Michael Bates	104	0.18	–	none listed
Total valid votes/expense limit		59,178	100.0		$95,207.51
Total rejected ballots		170	0.29	+0.01	
Turnout		59,348	65.31	+1.99	
Eligible voters		90,870	–	–	

2008 Canadian federal election: Peterborough
Party	Candidate	Votes	%	±%	Expenditures
Conservative	Dean Del Mastro	27,630	47.40	+11.50	$111,988
Liberal	Betsy McGregor	18,417	31.60	−0.77	$83,805
New Democratic	Steve Sharpe	8,115	13.92	−11.76	$47,973
Green	Emily Berrigan	4,029	6.91	+1.86	$10,235
Marxist–Leninist	Elaine Couto	98	0.17		none listed
Total valid votes/expense limit		58,289	100.00	–	$92,567
Total rejected ballots		164	0.28	−0.04	
Turnout		58,453	63.32	−6.34	
Electors on the lists		92,317			
Conservative hold		Swing		+11.6	

2006 Canadian federal election: Peterborough
Party	Candidate	Votes	%	±%	Expenditures
Conservative	Dean Del Mastro	22,774	35.90	+3.98	$80,784
Liberal	Diane Lloyd	20,532	32.37	−11.18	$68,799
New Democratic	Linda Slavin	16,286	25.68	+6.67	$61,606
Green	Brent Wood	3,205	5.05	−0.47	$7,949
Marijuana	Aiden Wiechula	455	0.72		none listed
Independent	Bob Bowers	179	0.28		none listed
Total valid votes/expense limit		63,431	100.00	–	$86,008
Total rejected ballots		207	0.33	−0.01	
Turnout		63,638	69.66	+4.47	
Electors on the lists		91,361			
Sources: Official Results, Elections Canada and Financial Returns, Elections Canada.

2004 Canadian federal election: Peterborough
Party	Candidate	Votes	%	±%	Expenditures
Liberal	Peter Adams	25,099	43.55	–	$82,907
Conservative	James Jackson	18,393	31.92		$51,318
New Democratic	Linda Slavin	10,957	19.01		$33,309
Green	Brent Wood	3,182	5.52		$4,730
Total valid votes/expense limit		57,631	100.00	–	$83,531
Total rejected ballots		192	0.33	0.00	
Turnout		57,823	65.19	4.42	
Electors on the lists		88,695			
Percentage change figures are factored for redistribution. Conservative Party percentages are contrasted with the combined Canadian Alliance and Progressive Conservative percentages from 2000.
Sources: Official Results, Elections Canada and Financial Returns, Elections Canada.

Note: Conservative vote is compared to the total of the Canadian Alliance vote and Progressive Conservative vote in 2000 election.

2000 Canadian federal election: Peterborough
Party	Candidate	Votes	%	±%	Expenditures
Liberal	Peter Adams	25,310	48.41	–	$55,442
Alliance	Eric John Allan Mann	14,924	28.54		$61,961
Progressive Conservative	Darrin Langen	7,034	13.45		$22,256
New Democratic	Herb Wiseman	3,967	7.59		$20,021
Green	Tim Holland	903	1.73		$1,738
Independent	Bob Bowers	147	0.28		$1,097
Total valid votes/expense limit		52,285	100.00		
Total rejected ballots		175	0.33		
Turnout		52,460	60.77		
Electors on the lists		86,319			
Sources: Official Results, Elections Canada and Financial Returns, Elections Canada.

Note: Canadian Alliance vote is compared to the Reform vote in 1997 election.

1997 Canadian federal election
Party	Candidate	Votes	%	±%
Liberal	Peter Adams	25,594	46.5	-1.0
Reform	Nancy Branscombe	15,759	28.7	+5.4
Progressive Conservative	Tom Macmillan	8,757	15.9	-4.1
New Democratic	Fred Birket	4,874	8.9	+3.6
Total valid votes		54,984	100.0	

1993 Canadian federal election
Party	Candidate	Votes	%	±%
Liberal	Peter Adams	27,575	47.6	+17.3
Reform	Len Bangma	13,460	23.2	
Progressive Conservative	Bill Domm	11,628	20.1	-20.8
New Democratic	Merv Richards	3,072	5.3	-22.2
National	Herb Wiseman	1,858	3.2	
Natural Law	Sandy Callender	368	0.6	
Total valid votes		57,961	100.0	

1988 Canadian federal election
Party	Candidate	Votes	%	±%
Progressive Conservative	Bill Domm	22,492	40.9	-11.8
Liberal	Barry MacDougall	16,693	30.3	+7.5
New Democratic	Gill Sandeman	15,147	27.5	+6.8
Libertarian	Mike Lantz	277	0.5	-2.4
Rhinoceros	C. Fibber McGee	238	0.4	-0.2
Green	George Kerr	208	0.4	0.0
Total valid votes		55,055	100.0	

1984 Canadian federal election
Party	Candidate	Votes	%	±%
Progressive Conservative	Bill Domm	27,121	52.7	+12.4
Liberal	Barry MacDougall	11,737	22.8	-12.9
New Democratic	Linda Slavin	10,648	20.7	-1.6
Libertarian	John Hayes	1,479	2.9	+1.9
Rhinoceros	Washboard Fisher	309	0.6	+0.1
Green	Simon Shields	175	0.3	
Total valid votes		51,469	100.0	

1980 Canadian federal election
Party	Candidate	Votes	%	±%
Progressive Conservative	Bill Domm	19,417	40.2	-4.2
Liberal	Sylvia Sutherland	17,202	35.7	-1.0
New Democratic	Paul Rexe	10,776	22.3	+5.4
Libertarian	Sally Hayes	469	1.0	-0.6
Rhinoceros	Mark Elson	243	0.5	+0.2
Independent	Robert J. Norris	69	0.1	
Marxist–Leninist	Richard Anthony	67	0.1	0.0
Total valid votes		48,243	100.0	

1979 Canadian federal election
Party	Candidate	Votes	%	±%
Progressive Conservative	Bill Domm	22,195	44.5	+11.5
Liberal	Hugh Faulkner	18,288	36.6	-16.3
New Democratic	Cyril Carter	8,451	16.9	+3.3
Libertarian	John Hayes	787	1.6	
Rhinoceros	Brian Flynn	150	0.3	
Marxist–Leninist	Richard Anthony	47	0.1	
Total valid votes		49,918	100.0	

1974 Canadian federal election
Party	Candidate	Votes	%	±%
Liberal	Hugh Faulkner	23,865	52.9	+7.4
Progressive Conservative	Duff Roblin	14,891	33.0	-7.1
New Democratic	Gill Sandeman	6,171	13.7	-0.7
Independent	Linda Peevers	187	0.4	
Total valid votes		45,114	100.0	

1972 Canadian federal election
Party	Candidate	Votes	%	±%
Liberal	Hugh Faulkner	20,282	45.5	+3.4
Progressive Conservative	John Doris	17,885	40.1	+5.3
New Democratic	Ray Peters	6,422	14.4	-8.7
Total valid votes		44,589	100.0	

1968 Canadian federal election
Party	Candidate	Votes	%	±%
Liberal	Hugh Faulkner	15,675	42.1	+5.1
Progressive Conservative	Archie McLean	12,972	34.8	-0.2
New Democratic	Bruce Hodgins	8,593	23.1	-4.9
Total valid votes		37,240	100.0	

1965 Canadian federal election
Party	Candidate	Votes	%	±%
Liberal	Hugh Faulkner	12,335	37.0	+7.0
Progressive Conservative	Fred Stenson	11,693	35.1	-0.9
New Democratic	Arthur Parker	9,327	28.0	-5.6
Total valid votes		33,355	100.0	

1963 Canadian federal election
Party	Candidate	Votes	%	±%
Progressive Conservative	Fred Stenson	11,909	35.9	-2.1
New Democratic	Walter Pitman	11,131	33.6	-2.7
Liberal	Hugh Faulkner	9,927	29.9	+4.3
Social Credit	David Hartman	180	0.5	
Total valid votes		33,147	100.0	

1962 Canadian federal election
Party	Candidate	Votes	%	±%
Progressive Conservative	Fred Stenson	12,185	38.1	+2.6
New Democratic	Walter Pitman	11,605	36.3	-9.5
Liberal	Hugh Faulkner	8,215	25.7	+7.0
Total valid votes		32,005	100.0	

By-election on 1960 By-election
Party	Candidate	Votes	%	±%
New	Walter Pitman	13,207	45.8	+39.2
Progressive Conservative	Harold Matthews	10,246	35.5	-31.3
Liberal	Donald Munro	5,394	18.7	-6.8
Total valid votes		28,847	100.0	

Note: New Party vote is compared to CCF vote in 1958 election.

1958 Canadian federal election
Party	Candidate	Votes	%	±%
Progressive Conservative	Gordon Fraser	19,032	66.8	+8.9
Liberal	Glenn Price	7,254	25.5	-3.5
Co-operative Commonwealth	John T. Taylor	1,887	6.6	0.0
Social Credit	Martin Graves	326	1.1	-5.4
Total valid votes		28,499	100.0	

1957 Canadian federal election
Party	Candidate	Votes	%	±%
Progressive Conservative	Gordon Fraser	16,598	57.9	+5.4
Liberal	Claire Hickman Stuart	8,301	29.0	-11.6
Co-operative Commonwealth	William Binney	1,887	6.6	-0.4
Social Credit	Martin Graves	1,887	6.6	
Total valid votes		28,673	100.0	

1953 Canadian federal election
Party	Candidate	Votes	%
Progressive Conservative	Gordon Fraser	13,206	52.5
Liberal	Maxwell Swanston	10,218	40.6
Co-operative Commonwealth	Maurice Ketcheson	1,747	6.9
Total valid votes		25,171	100.0

== See also ==
- List of Canadian electoral districts
- Historical federal electoral districts of Canada
