= Holy Cross Secondary School =

Holy Cross Secondary School may refer to:

- Holy Cross Catholic Secondary School (St. Catharines) in St. Catharines, Ontario, Canada
- Holy Cross Secondary School (Peterborough) in Peterborough, Ontario, Canada

== See also ==
- Holy Cross School (disambiguation)
