= Holy Cross School =

Holy Cross School may refer to:

== Places ==
=== Canada ===
- Holy Cross Catholic Secondary School (St. Catharines), Ontario
- Holy Cross Catholic Secondary School, Kingston, Ontario
- Holy Cross High School (Saskatoon), Saskatchewan
- Holy Cross Regional High School, Surrey, British Columbia
- Holy Cross Secondary School (Peterborough), Ontario

=== India ===
- Holy Cross Convent High School, Thane, Maharashtra
- Holy Cross High School (Kurla), Mumbai, Maharashtra
- Holy Cross School, Bokaro, Bokaro Steel City, Jharkhand

=== United Kingdom ===
- Holy Cross (Belfast), Northern Ireland, primary school picketed by loyalists
- Holy Cross Catholic High School, Chorley, Lancashire, England
- Holy Cross College (UK), Bury, Greater Manchester, England
- Holy Cross High School, Hamilton, South Lanarkshire, Scotland
- Holy Cross RC Primary School, Bristol, England
- Holy Cross Preparatory School, Kingston upon Thames, England
- Holy Cross School, New Malden, Kingston upon Thames, England

=== United States ===
- Holy Cross High School (Connecticut), Waterbury, Connecticut
- Holy Cross High School (River Grove, Illinois)
- Cathedral High School (Indianapolis), Indiana
- Holy Cross High School (Covington, Kentucky)
- Holy Cross High School (Louisville), Kentucky
- Holy Cross School (New Orleans), Louisiana
- Academy of the Holy Cross, Kensington, Maryland
- Hellenic College Holy Cross Greek Orthodox School of Theology, Brookline, Massachusetts
- Holy Cross Catholic School, Marine City, Michigan, a K-8 school
- Holy Cross High School (Marine City, Michigan)
- Holy Cross High School (New Jersey), Delran, New Jersey
- Holy Cross School, Bronx, New York
- Holy Cross School (Manhattan), New York
- Holy Cross High School (Queens), New York
- Holy Cross School (Philadelphia), Pennsylvania
- Holy Cross High School (Pennsylvania), Dunmore, Pennsylvania
- Holy Cross High School (San Antonio, Texas)
- Holy Cross Regional Catholic School (Lynchburg, Virginia)

=== Elsewhere ===
In alphabetical order of country:

- Holy Cross College, Ryde, New South Wales, Australia
- Holy Cross Girls' High School (Dhaka), Bangladesh
- Holy Cross High School (Bandura), Bangladesh
- Holy Cross School (Papatoetoe), New Zealand
- Holy Cross School, Henderson, New Zealand
- Holy Cross High School (Cape Town), the Western Cape, South Africa

== See also ==
- HCHS (disambiguation)
- HCS (disambiguation)
- Holy Cross (disambiguation)
- Holy Cross College (disambiguation)
- Holy Cross Convent School (disambiguation)
