= HCHS =

HCHS may refer to:

== Schools ==
=== U.S. ===
- Haines City High School, Florida
- Halifax County High School, South Boston, Virginia
- Hamilton County High School, Jasper, Florida
- Hanover Central Junior-Senior High School, Cedar Lake, Indiana
- Haralson County High School, Tallapoosa, Georgia
- Harlan County High School, Rosspoint, Kentucky
- Harnett Central High School, Angier, North Carolina
- Hoke County High School, Raeford, North Carolina
- Harrison Central High School (Mississippi), Lyman, Mississippi
- Harrison Central High School (Ohio), Cadiz, Ohio
- Hart County High School, Hartwell, Georgia
- Health Careers High School, San Antonio, Texas
- Helix Charter High School, La Mesa, California
- Henderson City High School, Henderson, Kentucky
- Henderson County High School, Kentucky
- Henry Clay High School, Lexington, Kentucky
- Hillwood Comprehensive High School, Nashville, Tennessee
- Hinsdale Central High School, Hinsdale, Illinois
- Holmes County High School, Bonifay, Florida
- Holyoke Catholic High School, Chicopee, Massachusetts
- Homer-Center Junior/Senior High School, Homer City, Pennsylvania
- Hononegah Community High School, Rockton, Illinois
- Houghton Central High School, Michigan
- Houston County High School (disambiguation)
- Hudson Catholic High School (Hudson, Massachusetts)
- Humphreys County High School, Belzoni, Mississippi
- Hunter College High School, New York City

=== Elsewhere ===
- Han Chiang High School, Penang
- Hanley Castle High School, Worcestershire, England
- Harry Collinge High School, Hinton, Alberta
- Heywood Community High School, Rochdale, England
- Hsinchu Senior High School, Hsinchu City
- Kaohsiung Municipal Hsin Chuang High School, Kaohsiung City

=== Other uses ===
- Thioformaldehyde, chemical formula HCHS

== See also ==
- Holy Cross High School (disambiguation)
