= St. Peter Catholic Secondary School =

Location
- 730 Medical Drive; Peterborough, Ontario, K9J 8M4; Canada; 44.305731°N 78.344107°W

Information
- School type: Catholic High School
- Motto: Per Angusta, Ad Augusta (Through trials, to triumph.)
- Religious affiliation: Catholic
- Founded: 1914
- School board: Peterborough Victoria Northumberland and Clarington Catholic District School Board
- Superintendent: Timothy Moloney
- School number: 845361
- Principal: Shannon Brady
- Chaplain: Rico Fuerzas
- Staff: 105
- Grades: 9 to 12
- Enrolment: 1175 (2019–2020)
- Language: English, French immersion
- Colours: Garnet and Gold
- Mascot: Saint Peter
- Team name: Saints
- Website: www.spcss.ca/en/

St. Peter Catholic Secondary School, abbreviated SPSS, is an urban high school located in Peterborough, Ontario, Canada. The school was originally opened in 1914, before moving to its current location in the mid-1990s. The school is administered by the Peterborough Victoria Northumberland and Clarington Catholic District School Board. The school is built for 1400 students from Grade 9 to 12. The school is within the Diocese of Peterborough.

== Notable alumni ==
- Kathryn Durst, artist and illustrator
- Carl Fitzgerald, Canadian football player
- Dan O'Toole, Canadian Sports Broadcaster

== See also ==
- Education in Ontario
- List of secondary schools in Ontario
