= HCC =

HCC may refer to:

== Computing ==
- Hobby Computer Club, Netherlands
- Holland Computing Center, University of Nebraska
- Human-centered computing

== Companies and organizations ==
- HCC Insurance Holdings, Texas, US
- Hampshire County Council, England
- Hindustan Construction Company, India
- Housing Conservation Coordinators, a tenants' rights organization, Manhattan, New York, US
- Hsinchu County Council, Taiwan
- NYC Health + Hospitals (New York City Health and Hospitals Corporation), New York City, US

== Schools ==
=== U.S. ===
- Hagerstown Community College, Maryland
- Heartland Community College, Normal, Illinois
- Henderson Community College, Henderson, Kentucky
- Highland Community College (Kansas)
- Hillsborough Community College, Florida
- Holyoke Community College, Massachusetts
- Honolulu Community College, Hawaii
- Hopkinsville Community College, Kentucky
- Housatonic Community College, Bridgeport, Connecticut
- Houston Community College, Texas
- Howard Community College, Maryland
- Hutchinson Community College, Kansas

=== Elsewhere ===
- Hailsham Community College, East Sussex, England
- Hameldon Community College, in Burnley, Lancashire, England
- Han Chiang College, Malaysia

== Other uses ==
- The IATA code for Columbia County Airport
- HCC (classification), for Paralympic Games cycling
- Hartford Civic Center, Connecticut, US
- Hawaii Cryptologic Center, of U.S. National Security Agency
- Hepatocellular carcinoma, a liver cancer
- Hindustani Covenant Church
- Hoosier Crossroads Conference, an athletic conference, Indiana, US

== See also ==
- Holy Cross College (disambiguation)
