= HCSS =

HCSS may refer to:

- The Hague Centre for Strategic Studies, The Hague, Netherlands
- Holy Cross Secondary School (Peterborough), Ontario
- Hypercompact stellar system, stars around a supermassive black hole
- Hardcore Superstar, Swedish rock band
  - HCSS (album), by Hardcore Superstar
