= Kathryn Durst =

Canadian artist and illustrator

Kathryn Durst is a Canadian artist and illustrator based in Toronto, Ontario.

== Early life and education ==
Durst was born in Peterborough, Ontario, where she graduated from St. Peter Catholic Secondary School. She attended Sheridan College.

== Career ==
After graduation, Durst worked as an animator for five years. She later worked as a freelance illustrator, and created illustrations for four books, including Vlad the World's Worst Vampire: Midnight Fright by Anna Wilson, and Merry Christmas, Mary Christmas by Laurie Friedman.

In 2017, Durst's artwork was included in Toronto's "Sketching the Line" art series.

In 2018, Durst began collaborating with musician Paul McCartney to create illustrations for a children's book, Hey Grandude! that was published on September 5, 2019 by Random House Books. A second book called Grandude's Green Submarine was published in September 2021.
