= Carl Fitzgerald (Canadian football) =

Canadian football player

No. 45
- Position: Fullback

Personal information
- Born: January 13, 1990 (age 36); Peterborough, Ontario, Canada
- Listed height: 6 ft 5 in (1.96 m)
- Listed weight: 239 lb (108 kg)

Career information
- College: Saint Mary's
- CFL draft: 2013: 3rd round, 20th overall pick

Career history
- 2013–2014: Winnipeg Blue Bombers
- 2015: Saskatchewan Roughriders
- Stats at CFL.ca (archive)

Carl Fitzgerald (born January 13, 1990) is a Canadian former professional football fullback. He was drafted by the Winnipeg Blue Bombersin the third round of the 2013 CFL draft.

At the conclusion of the 2015 CFL season, Fitzgerald was re-signed for 2016 by the Saskatchewan Roughriders.

== Early life ==
Fitzgerald grew up in Peterborough, Ontario and attended St. Peter Catholic Secondary School where he played high school football.
