= Holy Cross Convent School =

Holy Cross Convent School may refer to:

- Holy Cross Convent School, Windhoek, Namibia
- Holy Cross Convent High School, Thane, Maharashtra, India

== See also ==
- Holy Cross School (disambiguation)
