= Peterborough Regional Health Centre =

- Location in Ontario

Geography
- Location: 1 Hospital Drive, Peterborough, Ontario; K9J 7C6
- Coordinates: 44.3001°N 78.3476°W

Organisation
- Care system: Ontario Health Insurance Plan (OHIP)
- Type: District

Services
- Emergency department: Yes
- Beds: 518

Helipads
- Helipad: TC LID: CNU3

History
- Founded: 1999

Links
- Website: www.prhc.on.ca

Peterborough Regional Health Centre (PRHC) is a tertiary care hospital located in Peterborough, Ontario, Canada. The hospital was established in January 1999, and it is a combination of the former Peterborough Civic Hospital and St. Joseph's Health Centre. All acute care services were provided at 1 Hospital Drive (the former Civic Hospital), located in the Central-West part of the city, while chronic, rehabilitation and palliative care services, along with some out-patient medical and surgical services, were provided from the 384 Rogers Street site (the former St. Joseph's Health Centre) located in the "East City" or Ashburnham neighbourhood of Peterborough. Effective June 2008, all services of the PRHC (excluding some Outpatient Mental Health services and the Women's Health Care Centre) moved into a new 715,000 sq ft (66,400 m^{2}) hospital building located directly in front of the old Civic Hospital across from the Nicholls Building, which continued to house some Outpatient Mental Health services (including the Schizophrenia Clinic, Family & Youth Clinic, and Psychiatric Services for the Elderly) until 2010.

In late 2010, all patient services were moved into the new hospital building located at 1 Hospital Drive. Demolition of the Nicholls building began in November 2011 and was completed in December 2011.

The hospital is affiliated with the Queen's University School of Medicine, and is a training site for the Family Medicine Residency Program.

== Service area ==
The City of Peterborough, located in Central-East Ontario, is one of the largest cities between the Greater Toronto Area (GTA) and Ottawa, and is the business, culture, education, and health care centre of a greater region stretching from the Counties of Northumberland (south) to Haliburton (north), and the City of Kawartha Lakes (west) to Hastings County (east). The region covers a large geographic area, and is home to a population of approximately 350,000.

As a regional hospital, the PRHC receives many urgent and emergency transfers of seriously ill or injured patients from smaller hospitals in and around its catchment area, including hospitals in Bancroft, Barry's Bay, Belleville, Campbellford, Cobourg, Haliburton, Lindsay, and Trenton.

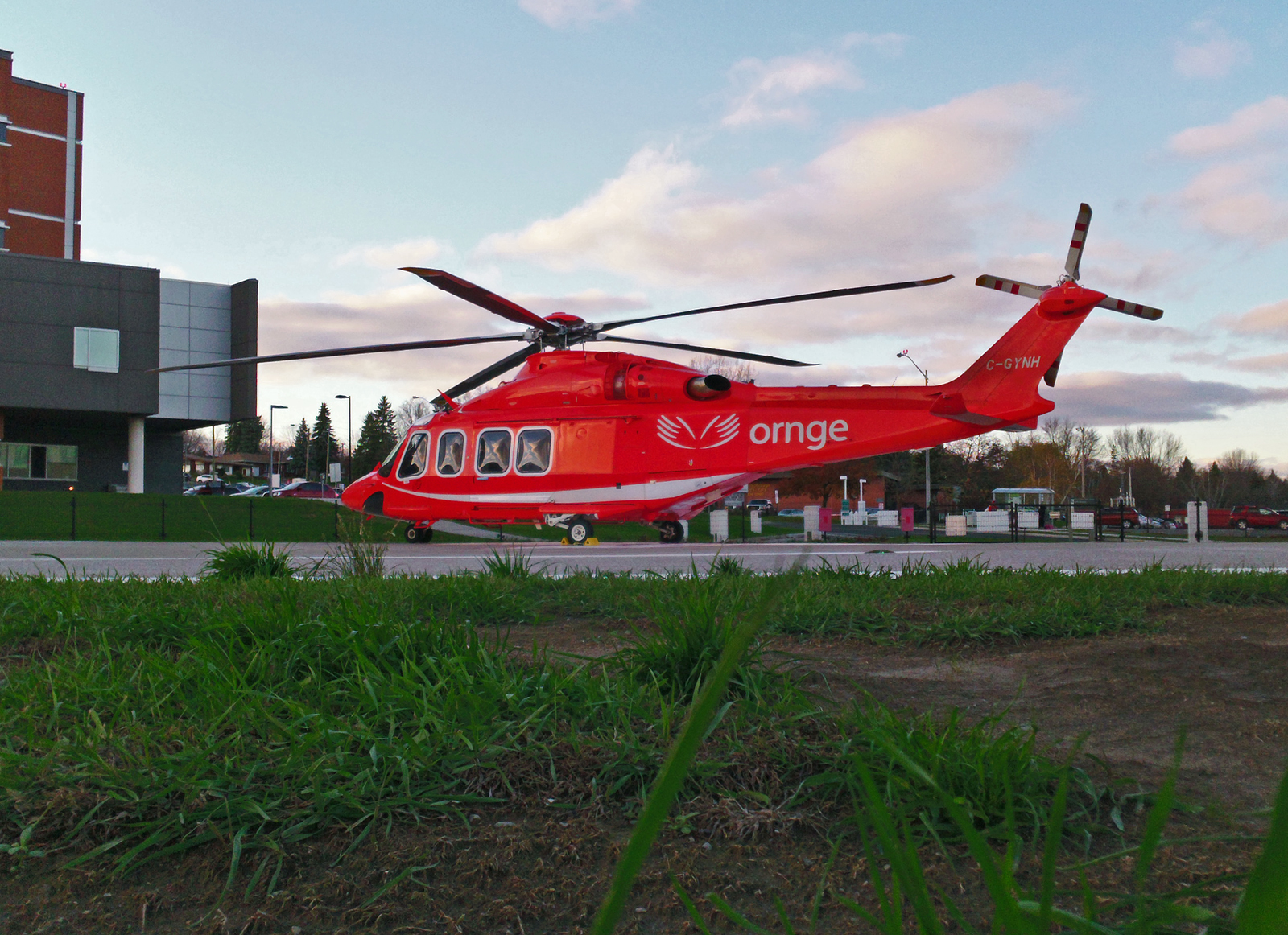
Peterborough Regional Health Centre is often accessed by ORNGE - both to incoming and outgoing patients.

== Staff and volunteers ==
PRHC is the region's largest employer with a staff of approximately 2,500 and about 500 physicians with various privileges. The hospital has more than 600 volunteers.

== Program and service areas ==
- Cancer Care (oncology and radiation services)
- Cardiac (including Interventional Cardiac Catheterisation, Telemetry, CCU and Pacemaker Insertion)
- Critical Care Medicine (ICU, Rapid Response Team, Plasmapheresis, Hemodialysis)
- Diagnostic Imaging Services (including General Radiology and Fluoroscopy, CT, MRI, Ultrasound)
- Dialysis
- Emergency Services (including Base Hospital and District Stroke Centre)
- General Medicine
- Geriatrics
- Internal Medicine (Cardiology, Dermatology, Endocrinology, Gastroenterology, Nephrology, Neurology, Rheumatology)
- Interventional Radiology
- Laboratory Medicine and Pathology
- Long-term Care
- Medical Oncology (including Outpatient Cancer Clinic)
- Mental Health Services (including Inpatient, Outpatient Clinics)
- Paediatrics (including Inpatient, Paediatric surgery)
- Perinatal & Women's Health (including Gynaecology, Labour & Delivery, Maternity, Basinettes, Level II Nursery, Women's Health Centre)
- Pharmacy
- Surgery (General, Gynaecology, Ophthalmology, Orthopaedics, Otolaryngology/ENT, Plastics, Urology, Vascular)Cardiac surgery

== Controversy ==
In October 2012, a lawyer leading a class-action lawsuit over the breach of privacy affecting more than 280 patients at Peterborough Regional Health Centre announced plans to file the action before the end of the year. Several affected patients reported that their medical records had been accessed by hospital staff not involved in their treatment. Some patients disclosed that they had been victims of earlier breaches the previous year and received notification letters from the hospital in the fall.

In November 2014, Ken Tremblay, the hospital's CEO, left his position under unclear circumstances. Alan Wotherspoon, speaking on behalf of the board of directors, declined to specify whether Tremblay resigned or was dismissed, stating only that it was a human resources matter. Two weeks later, three additional executives also departed from the hospital, with the institution stating that their exits were unrelated. Around the same time, the hospital announced a financial review, which later revealed that $57 million had been misclassified on the hospital's financial records, appearing on the balance sheet instead of the statement of operations as usable revenue. These events sparked criticism from the local community and the Peterborough Health Coalition, particularly as budget cuts had been ongoing for years.

== Helipad ==
The hospital has a ground level helipad located next to the hospital. A short walkway provides access from the helipad to transfer patients to the emergency room. This helipad is primarily used by Ornge.
