= St. Mary Catholic Secondary School, Cobourg =

Coordinates: 43.98285°N 78.16911°W

St. Mary Catholic Secondary School
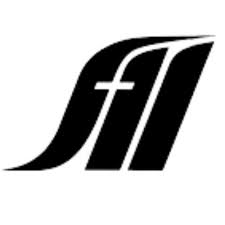

Location
- 1050 Birchwood. Trail; Cobourg, Ontario, K9A 5S9; Canada

Information
- School type: Catholic High School
- Religious affiliation: Roman Catholic
- Founded: 1984 (41–42 years)
- School board: Peterborough Victoria Northumberland and Clarington Catholic District School Board
- Principal: Shannon Brady
- Grades: 9 - 12
- Language: English, French
- Colours: Blue white and green
- Mascot: Thundy
- Team name: Thunder
- Website: www.smcss.ca/home

St. Mary Catholic Secondary School is a Catholic high school located in the town of Cobourg, Ontario. It provides classes for approximately 900 students from the surrounding Northumberland County area. the school is located the along Birchwood Trail in Cobourg, about 95 kilometres (59 mi) east of Toronto.

== History ==
The school has been part of the Cobourg community for over 40 years. St. Mary Catholic Secondary School was founded in 1984 and moved to its current site in September 1998. The school’s current site was later expanded in 2005 with a new wing of twelve classrooms

== Athletic and academic excellence ==
St Mary has a long history of athletic victories. Sports teams at St. Mary have won OFSAA titles in rowing, badminton, swimming, rugby, and javelin. It is also well known for its programming in arts and music. Students from St Mary School are often recipients of important academic and athletic awards.

== Feeder schools ==
St Mary has a long line of feeder schools

- St. Joseph Catholic Elementary School, Cobourg
- St. Michael Catholic Elementary School, Cobourg
- Notre Dame Catholic Elementary School, Cobourg
- St. Anthony Catholic Elementary School, Port Hope
- St. Mary Catholic Elementary School, Campbellford
- St. Mary Catholic Elementary School, Grafton

== French immersion ==
St. Mary Catholic Secondary School is the Secondary French Immersion Centre for all of Northumberland County.

== Notable alumni ==
- Josh Richards, musician, influencer, actor and internet personality
- Mason Flesch, Team Canada Rugby (captain)

== See also ==
- Education in Ontario
- List of secondary schools in Ontario
