= Kawartha String Orchestra =

Ontario community orchestra

The Kawartha String Orchestra (KSO) is based in Peterborough, Ontario, Canada. Founded in 2017, the KSO consists of experienced local community string musicians, and is run by an executive committee. The current conductor and music director is Tak Kwan, who is a professional violinist, and has been the concertmaster of both the Peterborough Symphony Orchestra as well as the Northumberland Orchestra and Choir.

The orchestra performs works both traditional and modern, ranging from Mozart and Corelli to Manookian and popular movie themes. The KSO also enjoys featuring guest musicians from the community.
