= Holy Cross College =

The College of the Holy Cross is a Catholic liberal arts college in Worcester, Massachusetts, United States. Holy Cross College may also refer to:

== Asia and Oceania ==
- Holy Cross College, Dhaka, Bangladesh
- Holy Cross College (Gampaha), a primary and secondary school in Gampaha, Sri Lanka
- Holy Cross College (New Zealand)
- Holy Cross College Ryde, a high school in Sydney, Australia

=== India ===
- Holy Cross College, Agartala, in Tripura
- Holy Cross College, Tiruchirapalli

=== Philippines ===
- Holy Cross College of Calinan, Calinan District, Davao City, Davao del Sur province
- Holy Cross of Davao College, Santa Ana Ave, Davao City, Davao del Sur province
- Holy Cross College Pampanga, in the municipality of Santa Ana, Pampanga
- Holy Cross College of Sasa, Buhangin municipality, Davao City, Davao del Sur province
- Holy Cross College, Santa Rosa, Catholic school established in the municipality of Santa Rosa, Nueva Ecija in 1946

== Ireland ==
- Holy Cross College (Dublin), Ireland

== United Kingdom ==
- Holy Cross College (UK), in Bury, England
- Holy Cross College, Strabane, Northern Ireland

== United States ==
- Holy Cross College (Indiana), Notre Dame, Indiana
- University of Holy Cross, New Orleans, Louisiana, formerly known as "Our Lady of Holy Cross College"

== West Indies ==
- Holy Cross College (Trinidad), in Arima, Trinidad and Tobago

== See also ==
- Hellenic College Holy Cross Greek Orthodox School of Theology, Brookline, Massachusetts
- Holy Cross (disambiguation)
- Holy Cross School (disambiguation)
- Holy Cross University (disambiguation)
- HCC (disambiguation)
- Pontifical University of the Holy Cross, Rome
- Roman College of the Holy Cross, Rome
