= Arborough Games =

Youth sports competition

The Arborough Games were an Olympics-like competition held between young people representing the cities of Ann Arbor, Michigan and Peterborough, Ontario in the 1980s and 1990s.

== Creation ==
In 1983, Peterborough became Ann Arbor's third sister city (after towns in Germany, and Japan; Ann Arbor has since twinned with cities in Nicaragua, Senegal and Cuba). The arrangement was inspired by Doug Walker, then head of the Ann Arbor Recreation Department, who suggested the cities set up a Junior Olympics-type exchange. The name "Arborough Games" was a portmanteau of the two cities' names.

At its height in the early 1990s, the Arborough Games brought numerous busloads of middle school students to Ontario to compete in soccer, baseball, track, volleyball, field hockey, and basketball, followed by a return delegation to Michigan the following year. Participants stayed in the homes of the opposing team and enjoyed a big party after the games.

== Decline ==
"It was the gem of the recreation department," remembers Larry Dishman. "When it first started, so many kids wanted to participate that we had to have tryouts." But as more opportunities to play sports opened up in Ann Arbor, interest waned. Toward the end "we were so frustrated we would practically hustle kids off the streets of Ann Arbor and tell them they didn't have to pay, just come," Dishman recalls.

By the late 1990s, the Arborough Games were reduced to a biennial competition. It was finally cancelled due to a lack of volunteers after the 2000 edition.
