= Coat of arms of Peterborough, Ontario =

The coat of arms of Peterborough, Ontario, was adopted on 7 May 1951.

Peterborough is one of the few cities in Canada to have an authentic coat of arms with exclusive right to its use. It was devised and granted by the College of Heralds of England. The shield itself has a green background. This represents the 'champs' (French for 'field') in the word "Champlain", a reference to the explorer's expedition through the Peterborough area in 1615. The green can also refer to the Emerald Isle, from which the first Irish immigrants were brought under the direction of the Peter Robinson in 1825. It also refers to the fields and forests of the area. The sword refers to the British soldiers and officers who fought in the Napoleonic Wars and in the War of 1812, and were granted tracts of land in the Peterborough region. The wavy blue-and-white bars signify the Otonabee River that cuts through the city, as well as the other numerous lakes and rivers in the area.

The crest above Peterborough's shield of arms is mounted on a wreath of the two chief colours of the shield, green and silver. On a log of wood cross-wise is a Canadian beaver, grasping in its left (sinister) forepaw a gold key pointing upwards and to the left. This is to represent the key of St. Peter, a tribute to the Roman Catholic third of the city's population, to the religion of the Irish immigrants, and to 'Peter' in the city's name.

The supporters of the shield represent the history and nature of Peterborough. The stag on the left-hand side is symbolic of Peterborough's natural surroundings. On the right-hand side is a red lion with its neck encircled by a golden crown chained over its back. The lion is taken from the Duke of Wellington's arms, as it was under him that many officers and men settled the area.

The green mound under the shield and supporters refers to the pastoral nature of the country south of the city. The city of Peterborough's motto, "Nature Provides, Industry Develops", is interpretively translated into Latin (Dat Natura, Elaborant Artes), which in turn broadly means that Nature gives bountifully and the crafts and energy of the people elaborate nature's gift.

Source: The City of Peterborough website
