= Peterborough Victoria Northumberland and Clarington Catholic District School Board =

Catholic school district in Ontario, Canada

Location
- 1355 Lansdowne Street West, Peterborough, Ontario, K9J 7M3, Canada Peterborough, City of Kawartha Lakes (Victoria), Northumberland and Clarington Canada
- Coordinates: 44.27813°N 78.35632°W

District information
- Chief executive officer: Stephen O'Sullivan
- Chair of the board: Kevin MacKenzie
- Schools: 30 Elementary; 6 Secondary
- Budget: CA$204,977,928
- District ID: B67067

Students and staff
- Students: 14,623 in 2015
- Teachers: 915
- Staff: 1,019

Other information
- Website: www.pvnccdsb.on.ca

The Peterborough Victoria Northumberland and Clarington Catholic District School Board (known as English-language Separate District School Board No. 41 prior to 1999) is the Catholic English school board for the region and is headquartered in Peterborough, Ontario, Canada.

The Peterborough Victoria Northumberland and Clarington Catholic District School Board has 30 elementary schools and six secondary schools to serve its urban and rural communities.

== Schools ==
=== Elementary ===
- Good Shepherd Elementary School, Courtice
- Holy Family Elementary School, Bowmanville
- Immaculate Conception Elementary School, Peterborough
- Monsignor Leo Cleary Elementary School, Courtice
- Monsignor O'Donoghue Elementary School, Peterborough
- Notre Dame Elementary School, Cobourg
- St. John Paul II Elementary School, Lindsay
- St. Alphonsus Elementary School, Peterborough
- St. Anne Elementary School, Peterborough
- St. Anthony Elementary School, Port Hope
- St. Catherine Elementary School, Peterborough
- St. Dominic Elementary School, Lindsay
- St. Elizabeth Elementary School, Bowmanville
- St. Francis of Assisi Elementary School, Newcastle
- St. John Catholic Elementary School, Peterborough
- St. Joseph Elementary School, Bowmanville
- St. Joseph Elementary School, Cobourg
- St. Joseph Elementary School, Douro
- St. Luke Elementary School, Lindsay
- St. Martin Elementary School, Ennismore
- St. Mary Elementary School, Grafton
- St. Mary Elementary School, Lindsay
- St. Mary Elementary School, Port Hope
- St. Michael Elementary School, Cobourg
- St. Mother Teresa Elementary School, Courtice
- St. Patrick Elementary School, Peterborough
- St. Paul Elementary School, Lakefield
- St. Paul Elementary School, Norwood
- St. Paul Elementary School, Peterborough
- St. Teresa Elementary School, Peterborough

=== Secondary ===
- Holy Cross Secondary School, Peterborough
- Holy Trinity Secondary School, Courtice
- St. Mary's Secondary School, Cobourg
- St. Peter's Secondary School, Peterborough
- St. Stephen's Secondary School, Bowmanville
- St. Thomas Aquinas Secondary School, Lindsay

== Students ==
- 10,015 Elementary students
- 4,608 Secondary students
  - Total of 14,623

== Statistics ==
Facts and figures - 2015/2016

- 30 elementary schools
- 6 secondary schools
- 1,934 employees
  - Academic staff - 915
  - Occasional academic staff - 360
  - Support staff (CUPE) - 558
  - Administration (includes supervisory officers, administrative support, principals and vice-principals) - 101
  - Trustees - 7

== See also ==
- List of school districts in Ontario
- List of high schools in Ontario
