= Hey Grandude! =

Children's picture book by Paul MCCartney

- Author: Paul McCartney
- Illustrator: Kathryn Durst
- Language: English
- Genre: Children's picture book
- Publisher: Puffin (UK) Random House (US)
- Publication date: 5 September 2019
- Publication place: United Kingdom
- Pages: 32
- ISBN: 9780241375655

Hey Grandude! is a picture book for children written by Paul McCartney and illustrated by Kathryn Durst. It was published by Puffin Books, an imprint of Penguin Random House, in September 2019. An audio version of the book with an instrumental soundtrack was also released.

McCartney has eight grandchildren. McCartney said in an interview with the BBC that the title of the book came from one of his grandchildren who "...used to call me 'Grandad' - just happened one day to say 'Grandude' and it kind of stuck...So the other kids started calling me 'Grandude'".

The title is also a reference to McCartney's 1968 song "Hey Jude".

McCartney started making up stories about Grandude, who he conceived of "as a kind of retired hippie having adventures with his grandchildren". McCartney said in an interview with the BBC that "I imagined him as a sort of eccentric old guy. He's got a grey beard, a little bit of a ponytail, so he's a little bit groovy. He has a little hat and a bow tie. And he has this magic compass so when he rubs that you can go anywhere". McCartney has stressed that Grandude is not based on him.

A sequel, Grandude's Green Submarine, was released in September 2021.

== Plot ==
The book is about a grandpa and his four grandchildren with a magic compass on an adventure. The group "ride horses with a cowboy in the desert, face an army of crabs on a tropical beach and dodge an avalanche while having a picnic up a mountain".

== Critical reception ==
Reviewing the book in The Guardian, Kitty Empire wrote that the reader would "struggle to detect the imprimatur of one of the 20th-century's creative greats here" feeling that as with other celebrity writers of children's books, "The famous seem to miss the fact that intelligence is not wasted on the young" and contrasts Hey Grandude!'s plot with the "phenomenally sophisticated" 'con trick' that the mouse plays on the Gruffalo in Julia Donaldson's eponymous picture book. Empire concludes by writing that there is an "all-round risk-averseness here that's puzzling. The book concludes with everyone safely tucked up in bed...But every gleeful scenario ends badly, with Grandude and the chillers fleeing when some avalanche or stampede invariably kiboshes the thrills. Why didn't an editor ask McCartney to take this sad song and make it better?"

The Sun wrote that it was a "charming tale from the music legend - with the most glorious illustrations that will be enjoyed by old and young" and OK Magazine wrote that "it's sure to take pride of place on any little one's bookshelf".
