= Peterborough Liftlock U11 Hockey Tournament =

Hockey Tournament for ages 9–11 in Peterborough, Ontario

- Most recent season or competition: 62nd Annual
- Formerly: Peterborough Liftlock Atom Hockey Tournament
- Website: liftlockatomhockey.ca/index.php

The Peterborough Liftlock U11 Hockey Tournament, formerly the Peterborough Liftlock Atom Hockey Tournament, is a hockey tournament for 9 to 11 year olds in Peterborough Ontario, Canada.

== History ==
The tournament was started in 1958 as a 1-day tournament with 8 teams, held in March annually. The tournament ran in this way for the first 11 years with chairman Neil Clark.

In fall 1969, Jack Guerin, Lloyd Hardy, Dan Dorsett and Howie Eastman approached the League Executive with a proposal to increase the size and length of the tournament from a 1-day, 8 team event, to a two-day, 16 team event. Since then the tournament has grown substantially, with 87 teams playing across four days in 2023 alone

== See also ==
- Peterborough, Ontario
- Ontario Minor Hockey Association, OMHA
