= Holy Cross High School (Cape Town) =

School in South Africa

Coordinates: 33.92068°S 18.49314°E

Location
- 161 Coronation Road; Cape Town; South Africa

Information
- Funding type: Private school
- Religious affiliation: Catholicism
- Website: holycrossonline.co.za

Holy Cross High School is a Catholic and independent school in the Western Cape.
