= Houston County High School =

Houston County High School is the name of several schools:

- Houston County High School (Alabama), Columbia, Alabama
- Houston County High School (Georgia), Warner Robins, Georgia
- Houston County High School (Tennessee), Erin, Tennessee
