= Kaohsiung Municipal Hsin Chuang High School =

Senior high school in Zuoying, Kaohsiung, Taiwan

Kaohsiung Municipal Hsin-Chuang Senior High School 高雄市立新莊高級中學
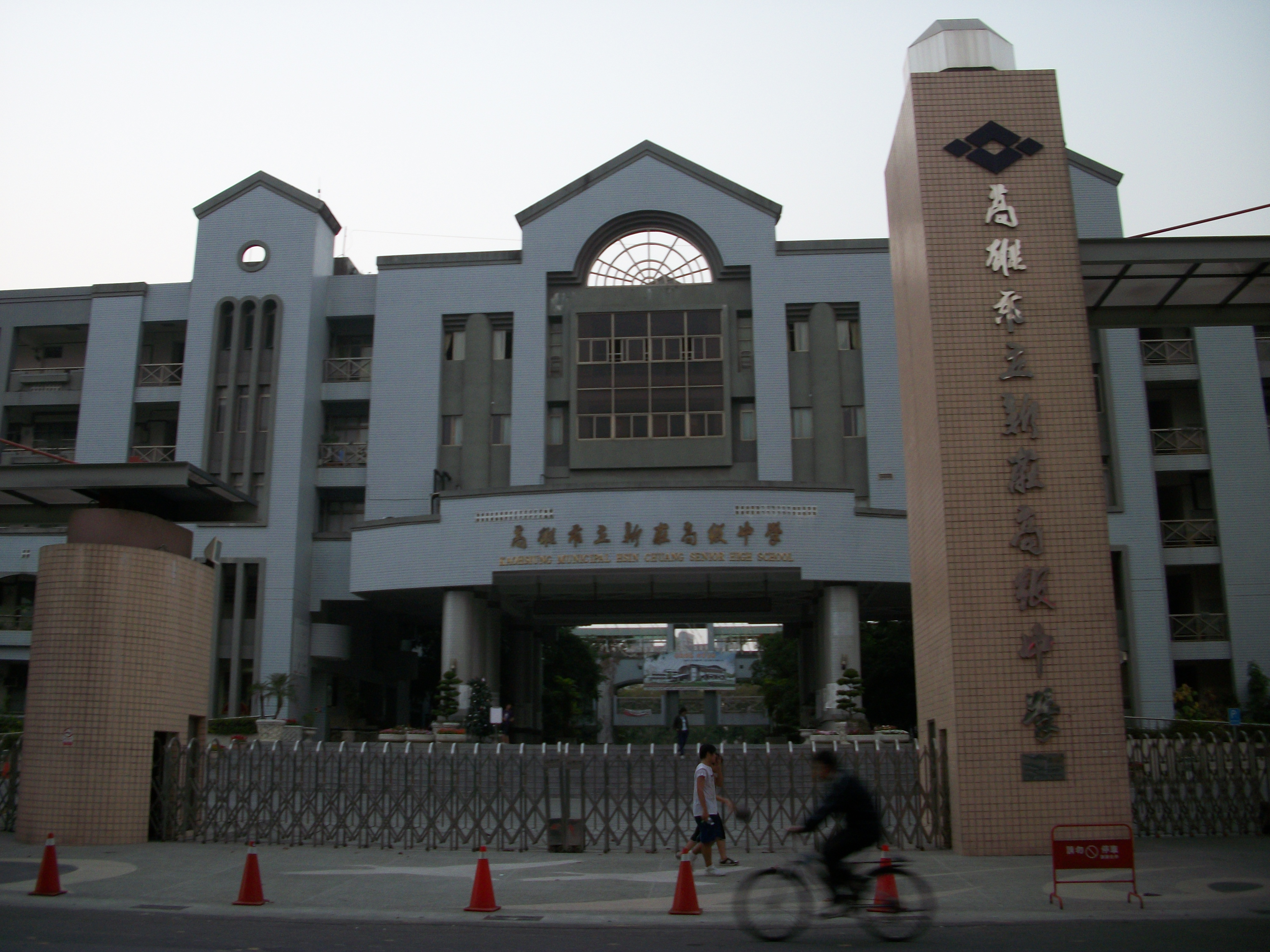

Location
- 99 Wenci Rd. Zuoying, Kaohsiung 813; Taiwan; 22°40′52.76″N 120°19′02.38″E

Information
- School type: public secondary
- Opened: 1995
- Principal: Wen-Zong Xu
- Grades: 10-12
- Gender: coed
- Website: http://www.hchs.kh.edu.tw/

The Kaohsiung Municipal Hsin-Chuang Senior High School (HCHS; Chinese: 高雄市立新莊高級中學) is a senior high school located in Zuoying district of Kaohsiung City, Taiwan. Established in 1995, it serves as a public high school mostly for the students in northern Kaohsiung. The current principal is Wen-Zong Xu.

== Transportation ==
The school is accessible within walking distance south east of Xinzuoying Station of Taiwan Railway.

== See also ==
- Education in Taiwan
