= Holy Cross Convent High School, Thane =

School for girls in Maharashtra, India

Coordinates: 19.204225°N 72.978997°E

Holy Cross Convent High School & Junior college is an all-girls school located in K'Villa, Thane, Maharashtra, India. It was founded in 1964 and celebrated its Golden Jubilee in 2014.

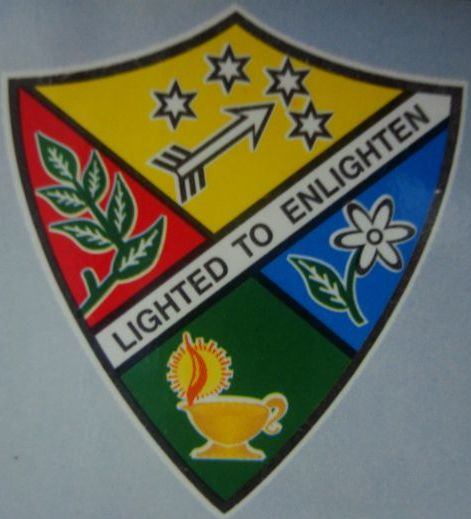
Holy Cross Convent High School Emblem

== History ==
In 1839, Mother Claudine Echernier founded the Congregation of the Sisters of the Cross of Chavanod in France with the help of Friar Peter Marie Mermier (who founded the Congregation of the Missionaries of St. Francis de Sales, known worldwide for its Salesian Convent Schools). The Sisters of the Cross spread to India in 1886 propagating their charitable educational goals for women in Amravati.
