= Holy Cross Secondary School (Peterborough) =

Catholic high school in Ontario, Canada

Holy Cross Catholic Secondary School

Location
- Peterborough, Ontario, Ontario, K9J 7M3; Canada; 44.279252°N 78.358054°W

Information
- School type: Catholic High School
- Religious affiliation: Roman Catholic
- School board: Peterborough Victoria Northumberland and Clarington Catholic District School Board
- Superintendent: Julie Selby
- School number: 704261
- Principal: Natalie Bittner
- Enrollment: approx 900 (2026)
- Language: English
- Colours: Green, Maroon and White
- Mascot: HurriK-9
- Team name: Hurricanes
- Website: www.hccss.ca

Holy Cross Catholic Secondary School is a Catholic Secondary School in Peterborough, Ontario, Canada. The school is administered by the Peterborough Victoria Northumberland and Clarington Catholic District School Board. It was founded in 1998 and is located at 1355 Lansdowne Street West. As of 2006, it had 867 students and 86 staff. Its mascot is a green tornado for the school's team the "Hurricanes".

In fall of 2011, Holy Cross Catholic Secondary School received the official opening ceremony and blessing to its new edition that had taken just over two years to completely build. The new addition had a cost of $8,743,000. Its features include 12 new classrooms, a new automotive technology classroom, a new library addition, new administrative offices, renovations to create new cosmetology/health care program spaces as well as improvements to kitchen, sewing/fashion areas and the construction technology space.

In late March 2012, Holy Cross Catholic Secondary School launched its new website as part of a larger initiative for all schools under the administration of the Peterborough Victoria Northumberland and Clarington Catholic District School Board to have a website by 2012 .

In early Spring 2019, construction started on a new $3.7-million artificial turf sports field. The field will be equipped with full LED lighting and an eight-lane running track. The total cost to build the field was $3.7-million, split between the Peterborough Victoria Northumberland and Clarington Catholic District School Board, and the Peterborough, Ontario City.

== See also ==
- Education in Ontario
- List of secondary schools in Ontario
