= Peterborough, Ontario =

City in Ontario, Canada

Peterborough
- City (single-tier)
- City of Peterborough
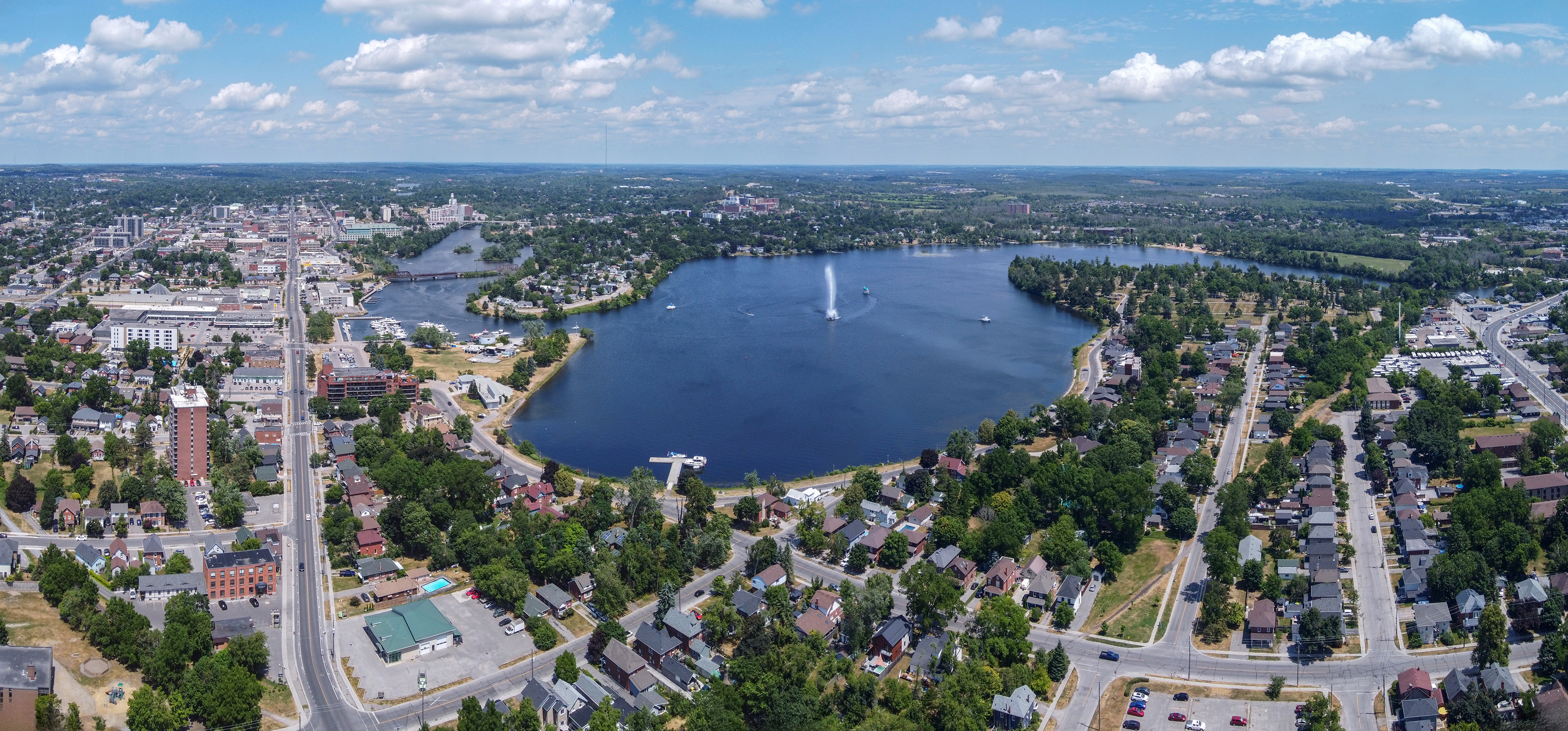
- Aerial view of Peterborough Little Lake in 2025

- Flag Coat of arms
- Nickname: "The Electric City"
- Motto: Dat natura, elaborant artes (Nature Provides, Industry Develops)
- Interactive map of Peterborough
- Location within Southern Ontario
- Coordinates: 44°18′04″N 78°20′00″W
- Country: Canada
- Province: Ontario
- County: Peterborough
- Established: 1819: Scott's Plains
- Incorporated as town: 1850: Peterborough
- Incorporated as city: July 1, 1905

Government
  - Body: Peterborough City Council
  - Mayor: Michael Eamon
  - MP: Emma Harrison (LPC)
  - MPP: Dave Smith (OPCP)

Area
  - Land: 64.76 km^{2} (25.00 sq mi)
  - Water: 12.67 km^{2} (4.89 sq mi)
  - Urban: 54.58 km^{2} (21.07 sq mi)
  - Metro: 1,508.44 km^{2} (582.41 sq mi)
- Elevation: 195 m (640 ft)

Population (2021)
  - City (single-tier): 83,651 (72nd)
  - Density: 1,291.8/km^{2} (3,346/sq mi)
  - Urban: 84,793
  - Urban density: 1,553.7/km^{2} (4,024/sq mi)
  - Metro: 128,624 (32nd)
  - Metro density: 85.3/km^{2} (221/sq mi)

Gross Metropolitan Product
  - Peterborough CMA: CA$6.0 billion (2022)
- Time zone: UTC−05:00 (EST)
  - Summer (DST): UTC−04:00 (EDT)
- Postal code span: K9H, K9J, K9K, K9L
- Area codes: 705, 249, 683
- Highways: Highway 7 / TCH; Highway 115
- Website: www.peterborough.ca

Peterborough (/ˈpiːtərbʌroʊ/ PEE-tər-burr-oh) is a city and county seat of Peterborough County, Ontario, Canada, about 125 kilometres (78 miles) northeast of Toronto. According to the 2021 Census, the population of the City of Peterborough was 83,651. The population of the Peterborough Census Metropolitan Area (CMA), which includes the surrounding Townships of Selwyn, Cavan Monaghan, Otonabee-South Monaghan, and Douro-Dummer, was 128,624 in 2021. In 2021, Peterborough ranked 32nd among the country's 41 census metropolitan areas according to Statistics Canada. The current mayor is Michael Eamon, who was sworn into office on November 19, 2026.

Peterborough is known as the gateway to the Kawarthas "cottage country", a large recreational region of the province. It is named in honour of Peter Robinson, an early Canadian politician who oversaw the first major immigration to the area. The city is the seat of Peterborough County, though it is politically independent from the county.

Peterborough's nickname in the distant past was "The Electric City" as it was the first town in Canada to use electric streetlights. This nickname also underscores the historical and present-day importance of technology and manufacturing as an economic base of the city, which has operations from large multi-national companies such as Siemens, Rolls-Royce Limited, General Electric, and local businesses such as Merit Precision Ltd., Dynacast, and Bryston. Electricity was one of the reasons Quaker Oats moved to the city, and as part of PepsiCo it remains a major fixture in the downtown area. However, over the years the number of major manufacturing plants has declined, and General Electric closed its last remaining facility in 2018. As a result, employment has been shifting toward the service industries and tourism is now the leading industry in the area.

== History ==
In 1615, Samuel de Champlain travelled through the area, coming down from Lake Chemong and portaging down a trail, which is approximated by present-day Chemong Road, to the Otonabee River and stayed for a brief time near the present-day site of Bridgenorth, just north of Peterborough.

=== 19th century ===
In 1818, Adam Scott settled on the west shore of the Otonabee River. The following year he began construction of a sawmill and gristmill, establishing the area as Scott's Plains. The mill was located at the foot of present-day King Street and was powered by water from Jackson Creek. This location, adjacent to the Ontario government Ministry of Natural Resources building, and Peterborough's Millennium Park may have been the site of landfall for a portage which connects in a direct line with Bridgenorth. The site has an Ojibway name "Nogojiwanong" which means "the place at the end of the rapids".

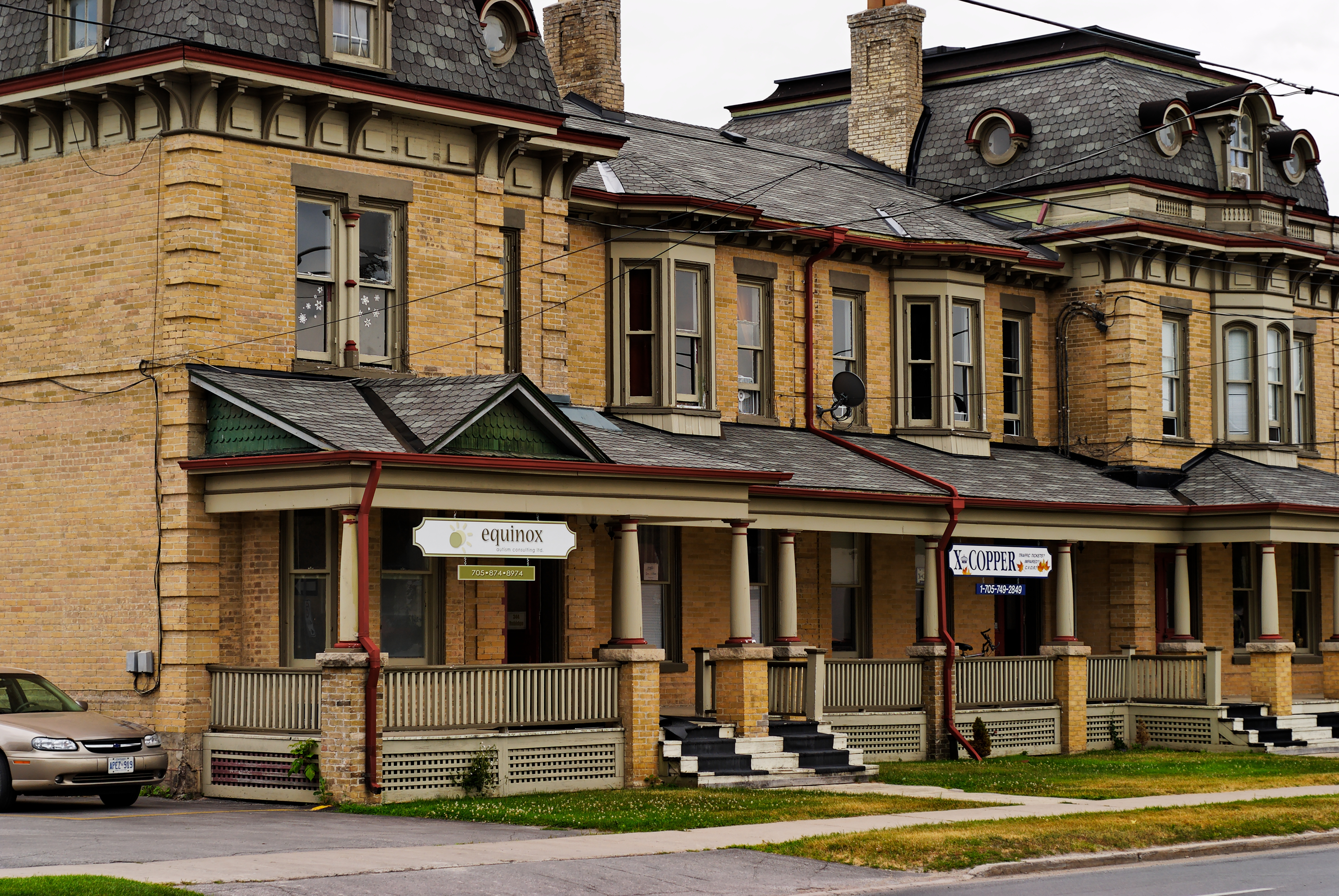
Cox Terrace on Rubidge Street, built in 1884 and declared a National Historic Site of Canada in 1991

The year 1825 marked the arrival of Irish immigrants from the City of Cork to Scott's Plains. In 1822, the British Parliament had approved an experimental emigration plan to transport poor Irish Catholic families to Upper Canada.

Peter Robinson, a member of the Legislative Assembly of Upper Canada and a prominent businessman from York, Upper Canada was the man who took on the emigration plan of 1825. Scott's Plains was renamed Peterborough in his honour. Robinson interviewed families and individual males to make the long voyage. These families had to meet specific criteria in order to be eligible for the voyage. The specifics required for Robinson's settlers were that they had to be Catholic, poor and with a knowledge of farming. Males had to be less than forty-five years of age, in good health, and families were unrelated. The majority of the Irish emigrants were chosen from Fermoy, North Cork.

Robinson was urged by landlords to remove the "pauper and undesirables". He resisted and stated that he had "no wish" to hold out a bounty to persons of bad character. But as Robinson travelled through the countryside they became flesh and blood 'people of a good sort' he called them, 'bred to farming. I found them much more intelligent than I expected. Most of them could read and write'".

Thomas Poole, a nineteenth century writer, wrote that all 2,024 passengers boarded nine ships in June 1825, with everything they owned, from Cork across the Atlantic Ocean to Quebec City. The journey took 30 days to cross the Atlantic, and on board the ship they were provided with bunks and food rations. Hard tack or ship biscuits were one of the many foods that were made to provide energy for the passengers. Hard tack was very easy to make and could be stored for months without spoiling. After the settlers landed in Quebec City, they travelled further down the St. Lawrence River, eventually reaching Lachine where they boarded a bateau, heading west to Kingston, and ultimately to Kingston and Cobourg. They camped in tents in Cobourg for several weeks until Peter Robinson joined them to lead them up to their final destination. The long voyage across the ocean was enough to weaken the emigrants but having to camp out in tents in the mid-summer heat brought on several other complications. Nearly all of the settlers experienced fever and ague, and several perished from it. Even faced with these hardships they forged ahead and put their trust in Peter Robinson, the man leading them to their settlement in Peterborough.

In 1845, Sandford Fleming, inventor of Standard Time and designer of Canada's first postage stamp, moved to the city to live with Dr. John Hutchison and his family, staying until 1847. Dr. Hutchison was one of Peterborough's first resident doctors.

By 1846, the community was flourishing, with a population of about 2000. A stone jail and court house had been built and there were seven churches and various government offices. There was a fire company, two newspapers and a post office that received mail daily. Industry included two grist mills, two saw mills, one brewery, one ashery, two distilleries, three foundries, three tanneries and tradesmen of various types worked here. One school and one bank agency were operating.

Peterborough was incorporated as a town in 1850, with a population of 2,191.

Beginning in the late 1850s, a substantial canoe building industry grew up in and around Peterborough. The Peterborough Canoe Company was founded in 1893, with the factory being built on the site of the original Adam Scott mill. By 1930, 25 percent of all employees in the boatbuilding industry in Canada worked in the Peterborough area.

Peterborough would also see extensive industrial growth as one of the first places in the country to begin generating hydro-electrical power (even before the plants at Niagara Falls). Companies like Edison General Electric Company (later Canadian General Electric) and America Cereal Company (later to become Quaker Oats, and in 2001 PepsiCo, Inc.), opened to take advantage of this new cheap resource.

=== 20th century ===
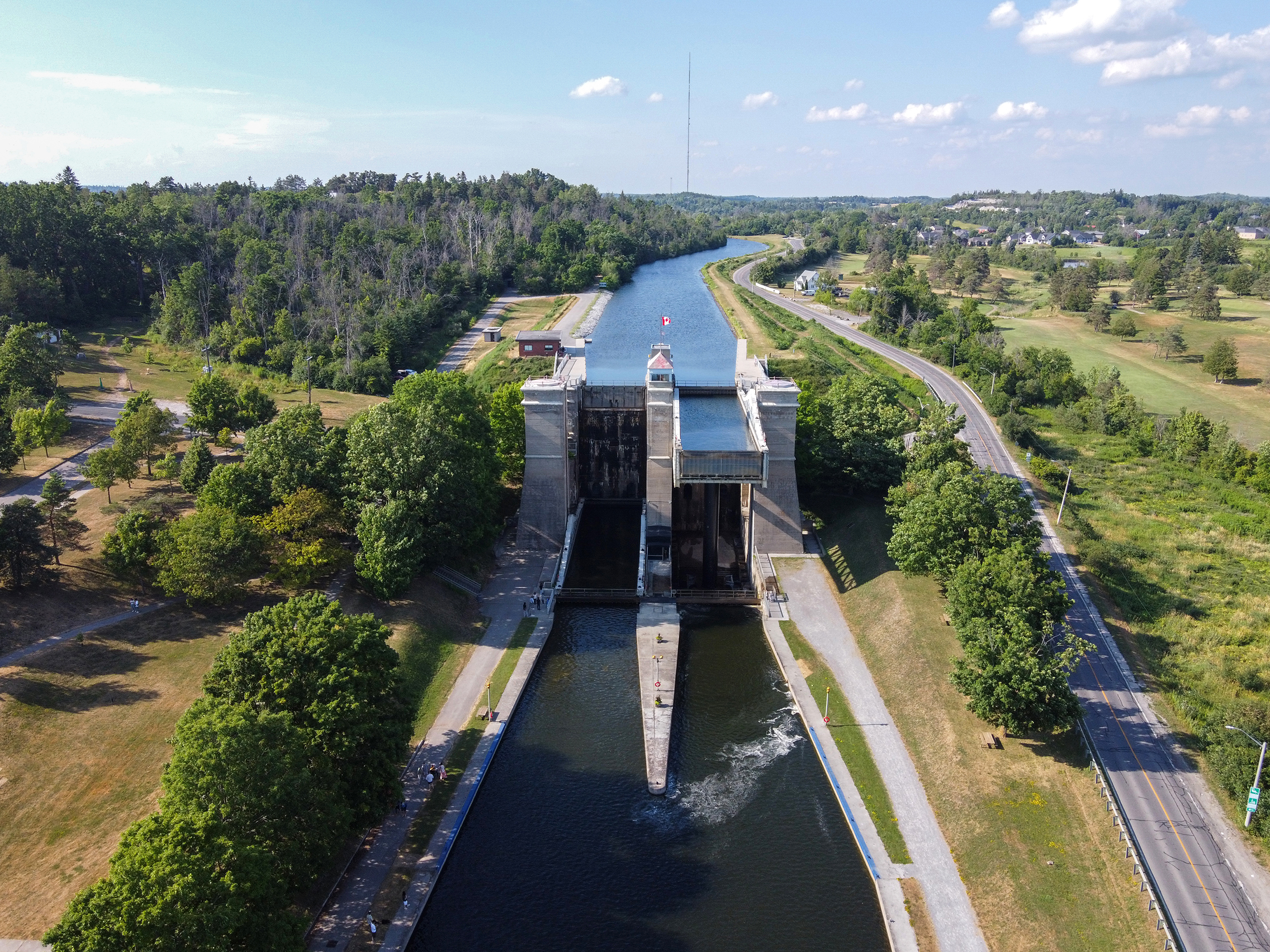
The Peterborough Lift Lock, constructed in 1904

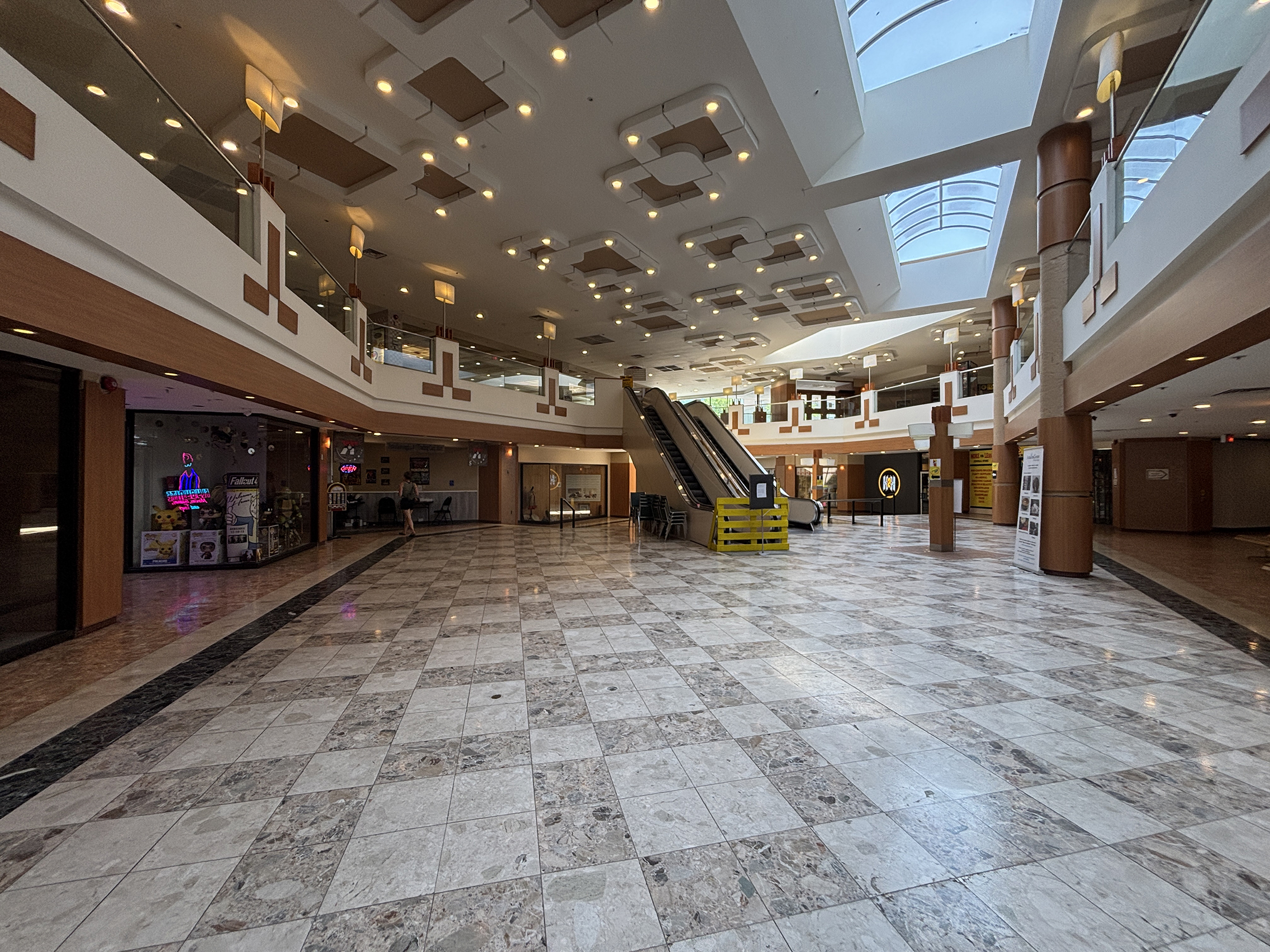
Interior of Peterborough Square

The first major events of the 20th century in Peterborough occurred in 1904. The first occurrence was the completion of the Peterborough Lift Lock on July 9, eight years after construction was initially approved. To this day, many landmarks in Peterborough memorialize Richard Rogers, conceptual father of the Lift Lock, such as Rogers Cove on Little Lake and Rogers Street in the eastern part of the city.

On July 1, 1905, Peterborough was incorporated as a city with a population of about 14,300. The city's flag and coat of arms were adopted later, in 1951.

In the 1970s, the Government of Ontario helped sponsor the building of Peterborough Square with the aid of the Ontario Downtown Renewal Programme (ODRP). The mall was anchored by an Eaton's store until the collapse of the Eaton's chain of stores in the late 1990s; it now houses offices, stores and a food court. The provincial government relocated the central office of the Ministry of Natural Resources to 300 Water Street, kitty-corner from Peterborough Square.

=== 21st Century ===
In 2008, the Peterborough Regional Health Centre opened, replacing the Civic Hospital and St. Joseph's Health Centre.

Lansdowne Place, the primary shopping centre in Peterborough, underwent a renovation in 2009, adding over 15 000 m^{2} (165 000 sqft) of retail space.

In September 2025, GE Vernova announced their plans to demolish the former General Electric factory complex, located at 107 Park St N. Despite controversy surrounding the plan for demolition, Peterborough city council approved GE Vernova's plan to demolish 26 vacant buildings on the property on October 14, 2025.

== Geography ==
Peterborough is situated in Central Ontario within the Kawartha Lakes region. Peterborough lies in the St. Lawrence Lowlands ecoregion, just south of the Canadian Shield and approximately 35 km (22 mi) north of Lake Ontario. The city is sited on a series of rapids in the Otonabee River, approximately halfway between the river's source (Katchewanooka Lake) and its mouth (Rice Lake). The city completely surrounds the only lake on the Otonabee, Little Lake, and the Trent Canal runs along the eastern edge of the city, connecting Little Lake to a section of the Otonabee above the rapids.

=== Topography ===
Peterborough's topography is largely defined by land formations created by the receding Wisconsian glaciers 10,000–15,000 years ago. The South End and Downtown portions of the city sit on what was the bottom of the glacial Lake Peterborough—part of a glacial spillway created when glacial meltwaters from ancient Lake Algonquin (now Lake Huron) travelled south to ancient Lake Iroquois (now Lake Ontario). This area of relatively low and flat relief (approximately 191–200 m (627–656 ft) above sea level) is prone to flooding, exemplified in the major flood that occurred on July 15, 2004. The ground elevation rises to the west, north, and east where a large upland area (the Peterborough Drumlin field) defines the landscape. Much of the land in the north and west ends of the city rises to 230–274 m (755–899 ft) above sea level, with Tower Hill, at 286 m (938 ft) above sea level, being the highest point. Armour Hill, another prominent drumlin located in east city, forms the physical obstacle that the Trent-Severn Waterway ascends by way of the Peterborough Lift Lock. The Oak Ridges Moraine is located approximately 15 km (9.3 mi) south of the city.

=== Climate ===
Peterborough has a humid continental climate (Köppen climate classification Dfb) with four distinct seasons. It lies in a transitional zone between areas to the south, which have a milder winter climate, and areas to the north (within the Canadian Shield), where the winters are snowier and sharply colder. Peterborough's Hardiness zone is 5b. Peterborough's climate can be quite unpredictable and vary greatly from one part of the city to another due to the effects of the Oak Ridges Moraine and changes in elevation. In the south end and areas south of the city, the Moraine acts as a barrier for weather patterns moving off Lake Ontario, reducing precipitation. In the north and west ends of Peterborough the effects of the Moraine are not as prominent, at times creating slightly cooler temperatures and more precipitation than the more southern parts of the city and county.

The highest temperature ever recorded in Peterborough was 38.9 °C (102.0 °F) on July 11, 1936. The coldest temperature ever recorded was −39.4 °C (−38.9 °F) on December 21, 1871.

Climate data for Peterborough (Trent University), 1991–2020 normals, extremes 1866–present (Note: Climate data was recorded in the city of Peterborough from April 1866 to December 1870 and at Trent University from January 1968 to present.)
| Month | Jan | Feb | Mar | Apr | May | Jun | Jul | Aug | Sep | Oct | Nov | Dec | Year |
|---|---|---|---|---|---|---|---|---|---|---|---|---|---|
| Record high °C (°F) | 14.4 (57.9) | 16.2 (61.2) | 26.0 (78.8) | 30.6 (87.1) | 35.0 (95.0) | 36.7 (98.1) | 38.9 (102.0) | 37.2 (99.0) | 37.2 (99.0) | 30.6 (87.1) | 23.9 (75.0) | 18.5 (65.3) | 38.9 (102.0) |
| Mean daily maximum °C (°F) | −2.3 (27.9) | −1.5 (29.3) | 4.4 (39.9) | 11.9 (53.4) | 20.0 (68.0) | 24.3 (75.7) | 27.5 (81.5) | 26.0 (78.8) | 21.8 (71.2) | 14.0 (57.2) | 6.9 (44.4) | −0.2 (31.6) | 12.7 (54.9) |
| Daily mean °C (°F) | −7.1 (19.2) | −6.7 (19.9) | −1.0 (30.2) | 6.0 (42.8) | 13.3 (55.9) | 18.1 (64.6) | 21.0 (69.8) | 19.6 (67.3) | 15.6 (60.1) | 9.0 (48.2) | 2.5 (36.5) | −4.0 (24.8) | 7.2 (45.0) |
| Mean daily minimum °C (°F) | −12.0 (10.4) | −11.9 (10.6) | −6.5 (20.3) | 0.0 (32.0) | 6.5 (43.7) | 11.8 (53.2) | 14.5 (58.1) | 13.3 (55.9) | 9.2 (48.6) | 3.7 (38.7) | −2.7 (27.1) | −8.0 (17.6) | 1.5 (34.7) |
| Record low °C (°F) | −37.8 (−36.0) | −38.9 (−38.0) | −31.1 (−24.0) | −20.0 (−4.0) | −7.8 (18.0) | −1.7 (28.9) | 2.2 (36.0) | −2.8 (27.0) | −7.8 (18.0) | −14.4 (6.1) | −23.9 (−11.0) | −39.4 (−38.9) | −39.4 (−38.9) |
| Average precipitation mm (inches) | 57.3 (2.26) | 48.8 (1.92) | 56.5 (2.22) | 66.4 (2.61) | 88.7 (3.49) | 83.0 (3.27) | 73.6 (2.90) | 87.0 (3.43) | 92.4 (3.64) | 77.0 (3.03) | 85.5 (3.37) | 66.0 (2.60) | 882.1 (34.73) |
| Average rainfall mm (inches) | 22.4 (0.88) | 23.1 (0.91) | 34.0 (1.34) | 60.9 (2.40) | 88.7 (3.49) | 83.0 (3.27) | 73.6 (2.90) | 87.0 (3.43) | 92.4 (3.64) | 75.7 (2.98) | 73.3 (2.89) | 35.0 (1.38) | 749.0 (29.49) |
| Average snowfall cm (inches) | 38.9 (15.3) | 28.8 (11.3) | 23.7 (9.3) | 6.1 (2.4) | 0.0 (0.0) | 0.0 (0.0) | 0.0 (0.0) | 0.0 (0.0) | 0.0 (0.0) | 1.4 (0.6) | 13.9 (5.5) | 34.3 (13.5) | 147.2 (58.0) |
| Average precipitation days (≥ 0.2 mm) | 14.0 | 9.3 | 11.3 | 12.0 | 12.8 | 11.2 | 10.1 | 11.4 | 11.8 | 14.3 | 14.2 | 12.8 | 145.2 |
| Average rainy days (≥ 0.2 mm) | 3.8 | 3.8 | 6.5 | 11.0 | 12.8 | 11.2 | 10.1 | 11.4 | 11.8 | 14.2 | 11.2 | 5.7 | 113.6 |
| Average snowy days (≥ 0.2 cm) | 11.0 | 6.6 | 5.8 | 2.0 | 0.0 | 0.0 | 0.0 | 0.0 | 0.0 | 0.23 | 3.8 | 8.2 | 37.6 |
| Mean monthly sunshine hours | 87.9 | 114.4 | 143.5 | 175.5 | 217.8 | 268.4 | 294.9 | 247.9 | 170.2 | 132.7 | 76.7 | 69.2 | 1,999.1 |
| Percentage possible sunshine | 30.6 | 38.9 | 38.9 | 43.5 | 47.6 | 57.9 | 62.7 | 57.1 | 45.2 | 38.9 | 26.5 | 25.0 | 42.7 |
Source 1: Infoclimat.fr
Source 2: Environment and Climate Change Canada (precipitation/rain/snow/sun 1981–2010)

Climate data for Peterborough, Ontario (Peterborough Airport) 1991–2020 normals, extremes 1969–2020
| Month | Jan | Feb | Mar | Apr | May | Jun | Jul | Aug | Sep | Oct | Nov | Dec | Year |
|---|---|---|---|---|---|---|---|---|---|---|---|---|---|
| Record high °C (°F) | 13.4 (56.1) | 13.1 (55.6) | 26.0 (78.8) | 29.7 (85.5) | 32.5 (90.5) | 34.4 (93.9) | 36.1 (97.0) | 36.2 (97.2) | 33.9 (93.0) | 28.9 (84.0) | 22.8 (73.0) | 19.2 (66.6) | 36.2 (97.2) |
| Mean daily maximum °C (°F) | −2.6 (27.3) | −1.8 (28.8) | 4.1 (39.4) | 11.6 (52.9) | 19.3 (66.7) | 24.0 (75.2) | 26.6 (79.9) | 25.5 (77.9) | 21.4 (70.5) | 13.9 (57.0) | 6.6 (43.9) | 0.4 (32.7) | 12.4 (54.3) |
| Daily mean °C (°F) | −7.6 (18.3) | −7.3 (18.9) | −1.5 (29.3) | 5.7 (42.3) | 12.5 (54.5) | 17.4 (63.3) | 19.7 (67.5) | 18.6 (65.5) | 14.4 (57.9) | 8.0 (46.4) | 1.9 (35.4) | −3.9 (25.0) | 6.5 (43.7) |
| Mean daily minimum °C (°F) | −12.8 (9.0) | −12.8 (9.0) | −7.1 (19.2) | −0.3 (31.5) | 5.6 (42.1) | 10.7 (51.3) | 12.8 (55.0) | 11.7 (53.1) | 7.3 (45.1) | 2.0 (35.6) | −2.9 (26.8) | −8.3 (17.1) | 0.5 (32.9) |
| Record low °C (°F) | −37.9 (−36.2) | −37.8 (−36.0) | −31.4 (−24.5) | −15.0 (5.0) | −7.7 (18.1) | −0.7 (30.7) | 3.5 (38.3) | 0.0 (32.0) | −6.3 (20.7) | −9.9 (14.2) | −22.9 (−9.2) | −33.9 (−29.0) | −37.9 (−36.2) |
| Average precipitation mm (inches) | 66.5 (2.62) | 42.3 (1.67) | 53.6 (2.11) | 72.7 (2.86) | 79.4 (3.13) | 87.8 (3.46) | 69.1 (2.72) | 77.6 (3.06) | 75.7 (2.98) | 74.7 (2.94) | 76.3 (3.00) | 64.1 (2.52) | 839.6 (33.06) |
| Average rainfall mm (inches) | 30.5 (1.20) | 21.0 (0.83) | 27.6 (1.09) | 63.7 (2.51) | 82.9 (3.26) | 80.6 (3.17) | 77.2 (3.04) | 69.4 (2.73) | 82.6 (3.25) | 72.4 (2.85) | 70.0 (2.76) | 31.7 (1.25) | 709.7 (27.94) |
| Average snowfall cm (inches) | 45.2 (17.8) | 26.8 (10.6) | 27.6 (10.9) | 7.2 (2.8) | 0.0 (0.0) | 0.0 (0.0) | 0.0 (0.0) | 0.0 (0.0) | 0.0 (0.0) | 1.1 (0.4) | 16.9 (6.7) | 32.6 (12.8) | 157.5 (62.0) |
| Average precipitation days (≥ 0.2 mm) | 16.4 | 12.4 | 12.9 | 12.7 | 12.5 | 11.9 | 10.6 | 12.1 | 11.8 | 14.5 | 15.1 | 14.5 | 157.3 |
| Average rainy days (≥ 0.2 mm) | 5.5 | 4.6 | 7.4 | 11.3 | 12.3 | 11.1 | 11.3 | 11.3 | 12.1 | 14.1 | 11.5 | 7.0 | 119.5 |
| Average snowy days (≥ 0.2 cm) | 14.9 | 11.0 | 8.6 | 3.3 | 0.0 | 0.0 | 0.0 | 0.0 | 0.0 | 0.56 | 6.3 | 9.7 | 54.4 |
| Average relative humidity (%) (at 15:00 LST) | 69.7 | 64.9 | 57.3 | 52.1 | 52.8 | 58.0 | 57.1 | 58.0 | 59.5 | 63.6 | 68.8 | 72.9 | 61.2 |
Source: Environment and Climate Change Canada

==== Significant weather events ====
In 2004, Peterborough experienced a flood which caused much damage to the city and surrounding areas. On July 15, 2004, the region received up to 240 millimetres (or 9.5 inches) of rain. The sewage treatment plant recorded 32 million litres (7×10^{6} imp gal) of water as opposed to the 5.9 million litres (1.30×10^{6} imp gal) average. Existing pipes in the city's storm water system struggled with the rainfall amount as they were undersized and aged. Jackson Creek flooded the streets of downtown and many buildings had flooded basements. Over 1300 people received emergency clothing from the city of Peterborough, over 1000 households required emergency food and 171 residents of a long-term care home were evacuated. The city recorded 12,500 t (12,300 long tons; 13,800 short tons) of debris added to landfills due to the amount of damage caused by excessive rain and wind. Damage to private property and infrastructure exceeded $100 million and the Ontario government contributed $25 million in emergency funding. As a result of the "one in a century flood" damage, storm sewers received improvements in Peterborough, largely completed between 2021 and 2023. Much of these improvements were focused on Little Lake, Jackson Creek, and with the installation of storm sewers under Townsend Street and Bethune Street.

In May 2022, the City of Peterborough was involved in the May 2022 Canadian derecho. This left citizens without power for several days and an estimated cost of cleanup of $3.3 million. Hydro poles and lines were brought down by the winds and residents of Peterborough were some of the 500,000 Ontarians left without power because of the storm. Environment Canada recorded the derecho's wind speeds up to 132 km/hour and other regions of Ontario had tornadoes touch down.

Peterborough declared a state of emergency yet again in 2025 when an ice storm hit parts of central Ontario at the end of March. Over 20 millimetres of ice blanketed trees, hydro lines, houses, and the roads as a result of the multi-day event. Over 660,000 Ontario households lost power and some residents of Peterborough were out of power for a week or longer. Fallen trees knocked down numerous powerlines and made roads impassable. The ice storm cleanup cost the city of Peterborough over $11 million.

== Demographics ==
In the 2021 Census of Population conducted by Statistics Canada, Peterborough had a population of 83,651 living in 35,977 of its 38,006 total private dwellings, a change of 3.2% from its 2016 population of 81,032. With a land area of 64.76 km^{2} (25.00 sq mi), it had a population density of 1,291.7/km^{2} (3,345.5/sq mi) in 2021.

Historical populations

| Year | Pop. | ±% |
|---|---|---|
| 1841 | 2,000 | — |
| 1851 | 2,191 | +9.5% |
| 1871 | 4,611 | +110.5% |
| 1881 | 6,812 | +47.7% |
| 1891 | 9,717 | +42.6% |
| 1901 | 11,239 | +15.7% |
| 1911 | 18,360 | +63.4% |

| Year | Pop. | ±% |
|---|---|---|
| 1921 | 20,994 | +14.3% |
| 1931 | 22,372 | +6.6% |
| 1941 | 24,977 | +11.6% |
| 1951 | 38,272 | +53.2% |
| 1961 | 47,185 | +23.3% |
| 1971 | 58,111 | +23.2% |
| 1981 | 60,620 | +4.3% |

| Year | Pop. | ±% |
|---|---|---|
| 1991 | 68,371 | +12.8% |
| 1996 | 69,742 | +2.0% |
| 2001 | 71,446 | +2.4% |
| 2006 | 74,898 | +4.8% |
| 2011 | 78,698 | +5.1% |
| 2016 | 81,032 | +3.0% |
| 2021 | 83,651 | +3.2% |

At the census metropolitan area (CMA) level in the 2021 census, the Peterborough CMA had a population of 128,624 living in 53,370 of its 57,761 total private dwellings, a change of 5.7% from its 2016 population of 121,721. With a land area of 1,508.44 km^{2} (582.41 sq mi), it had a population density of 85.3/km^{2} (220.8/sq mi) in 2021.

=== Religion ===
Largest non-Christian religion in Peterborough CMA by census tract based on the 2021 census

50.9% of Peterborough residents were Christian, down from 67.3% in 2011. 20.6% were Catholic, 19.2% were Protestant, and 6.4% were Christian n.o.s. All other Christian denominations and Christian-related traditions accounted for 4.7% of the population. 43.7% of residents were non-religious or secular, up from 29.9% in 2011. Followers of other religions made up 5.5% of residents, up from 2.7% in 2011. The largest non-Christian religions were Islam (1.5%), Hinduism (1.4%) and Buddhism (0.5%).

=== Ethnicity ===
As of 2021, 85.7% of Peterborough residents were white/European, 9.4% were visible minorities and 5.0% were Indigenous. The largest visible minority groups were South Asian (3.1%), Black (1.4%), and Chinese (1.0%).

Largest ethnic origin in Peterborough CMA by census tract based on the 2021 census

| Ethnic and Cultural origins (2021) | Population | Percent |
|---|---|---|
| English | 25,955 | 31.8% |
| Irish | 24,390 | 29.9% |
| Scottish | 20,120 | 24.7% |
| Canadian | 13,360 | 16.4% |
| French n.o.s | 7,745 | 9.5% |
| German | 7,160 | 8.8% |
| British Isles n.o.s | 4,350 | 5.3% |
| Dutch | 4,285 | 5.3% |
| Caucasian (White) n.o.s+ European n.o.s | 3,615 | 4.4% |
| Italian | 3,315 | 4% |
| First Nations (North American Indian) n.o.s.+ North American Indigenous, n.o.s. | 2,520 | 3.1% |
| Polish | 2,285 | 2.8% |
| Welsh | 2,050 | 2.5% |

Panethnic groups in the City of Peterborough (2001−2021)
| Panethnic group | 2021 | | 2016 | | 2011 | | 2006 | | 2001 | |
| Panethnic group | Pop. | % | Pop. | % | Pop. | % | Pop. | % | Pop. | % |
|---|---|---|---|---|---|---|---|---|---|---|
| European (Note: Statistic includes all persons that did not make up part of a visible minority or an indigenous identity.) | 69,920 | 85.69% | 70,450 | 89.71% | 70,605 | 92.48% | 69,495 | 94.15% | 65,910 | 94.76% |
| Indigenous | 4,040 | 4.95% | 3,275 | 4.17% | 2,605 | 3.41% | 1,690 | 2.29% | 1,355 | 1.95% |
| South Asian | 2,570 | 3.15% | 1,315 | 1.67% | 705 | 0.92% | 555 | 0.75% | 720 | 1.04% |
| East Asian (Note: Statistic includes total responses of "Chinese", "Korean", and "Japanese" under visible minority section on census.) | 1,205 | 1.48% | 1,155 | 1.47% | 765 | 1% | 985 | 1.33% | 615 | 0.88% |
| African | 1,115 | 1.37% | 795 | 1.01% | 490 | 0.64% | 440 | 0.6% | 390 | 0.56% |
| Southeast Asian (Note: Statistic includes total responses of "Filipino" and "Southeast Asian" under visible minority section on census.) | 1,100 | 1.35% | 655 | 0.83% | 535 | 0.7% | 215 | 0.29% | 230 | 0.33% |
| Middle Eastern (Note: Statistic includes total responses of "West Asian" and "Arab" under visible minority section on census.) | 745 | 0.91% | 350 | 0.45% | 265 | 0.35% | 150 | 0.2% | 115 | 0.17% |
| Latin American | 420 | 0.51% | 205 | 0.26% | 210 | 0.28% | 215 | 0.29% | 115 | 0.17% |
| Other (Note: Statistic includes total responses of "Visible minority, n.i.e." and "Multiple visible minorities" under visible minority section on census.) | 470 | 0.58% | 330 | 0.42% | 170 | 0.22% | 65 | 0.09% | 110 | 0.16% |
| Total responses | 81,600 | 97.55% | 78,530 | 96.91% | 76,350 | 96.92% | 73,810 | 98.55% | 69,555 | 97.35% |
| Total population | 83,651 | 100% | 81,032 | 100% | 78,777 | 100% | 74,898 | 100% | 71,446 | 100% |
Note: Totals greater than 100% due to multiple origin responses

=== Language ===
90.2% of the population spoke English as their mother tongue. Other common first languages were French (1.0%), Chinese languages (0.6%), and Arabic (0.5%).

== Economy ==
The Peterborough Regional Health Centre is the largest employer, with about 2,500 employees and 500 volunteers in 2023. Trent University and the Ontario Ministry of Natural Resources are other large employers.

General Electric operated in Peterborough from 1892 to 2018, and employed about 6,000 people at its peak. The North American Free Trade Agreement (NAFTA) of the early 1990s led to shifts in trading patterns for many Canadian companies.

In 2025, Siemens, a large manufacturing employer, announced it would be winding down its Peterborough facility, impacting 160 jobs. Shortly afterward another major employer, airline company Lufthansa announced it would be closing its Peterborough customer service centre, laying off 400 employees.

In the 2000s, the city faced high unemployment, and its unemployment rate often led the country for census metropolitan areas in Canada. By December 2017, the rate was roughly on par with the national average at under 5%.

An analysis in 2017 said: "A moderate but improving growth environment is foreseen for the region and the Peterborough CMA in 2017 and 2018. The region’s shift to service-producing industries will continue as in other regions in Ontario and a growing portion of service industries will become export-oriented".

In 2018, mayor Daryl Bennett said there has been a shift toward employment in smaller manufacturing plants and service industries, leading to a moderate level of unemployment, and that the shift away from manufacturing had started before the NAFTA free trade agreements.

In 2018, the city had plans for a $24-million Canadian Canoe Museum, a new casino, a new library, the VentureNorth building in downtown, and development of lands at Trent University. The Canadian Canoe Museum was completed in 2024.

Peterborough is a shopping destination for the region, with three shopping centres: Peterborough Square, Portage Place, and Lansdowne Place. Walmart, Costco, Sobey's and Real Canadian Superstore have large operations in Peterborough, drawing customers from the surrounding area. Sears, in Lansdowne Place, closed in 2018 due to bankruptcy.

== Notable sites ==
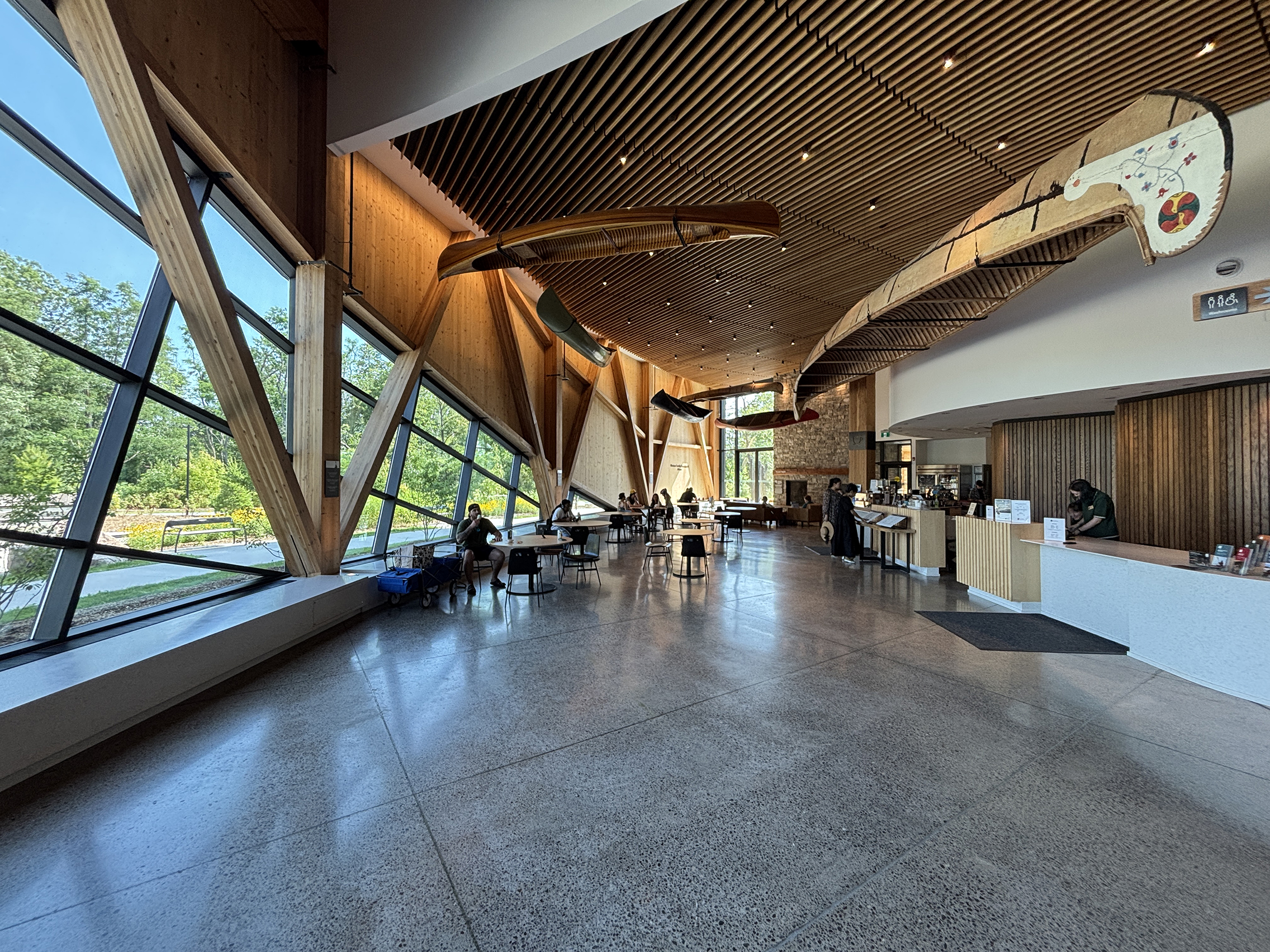
Canadian Canoe Museum

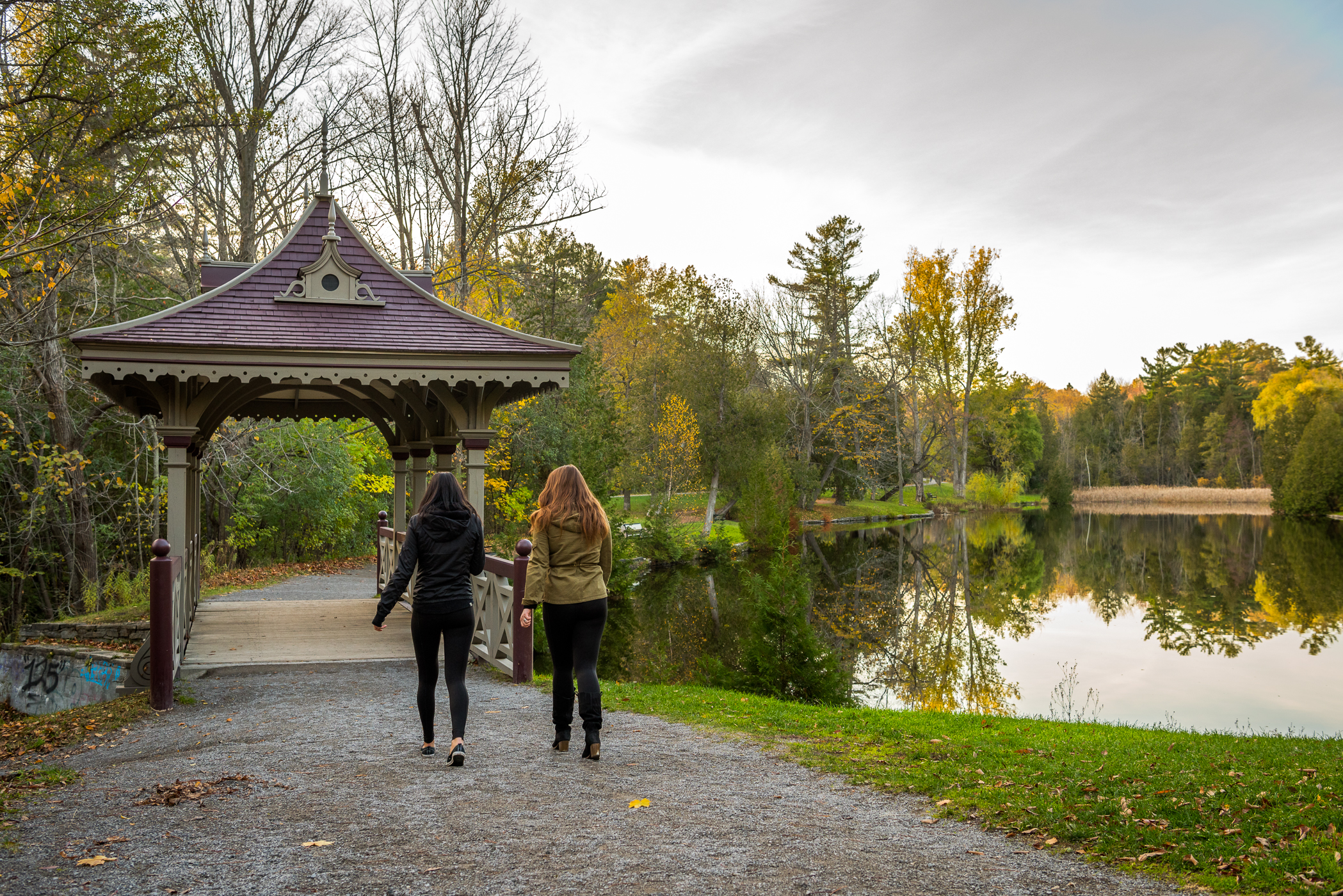
Jackson Park

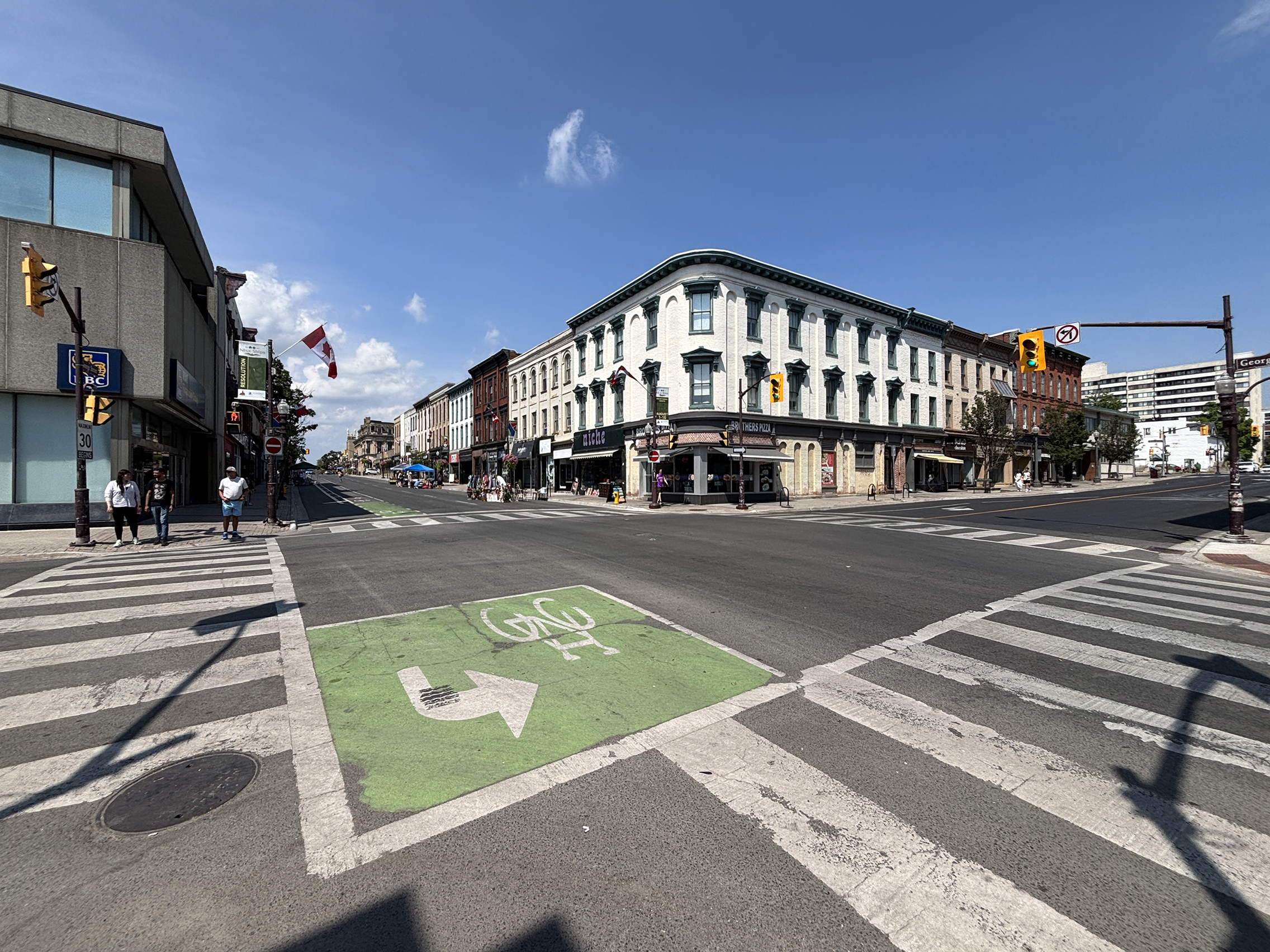
Peterborough downtown

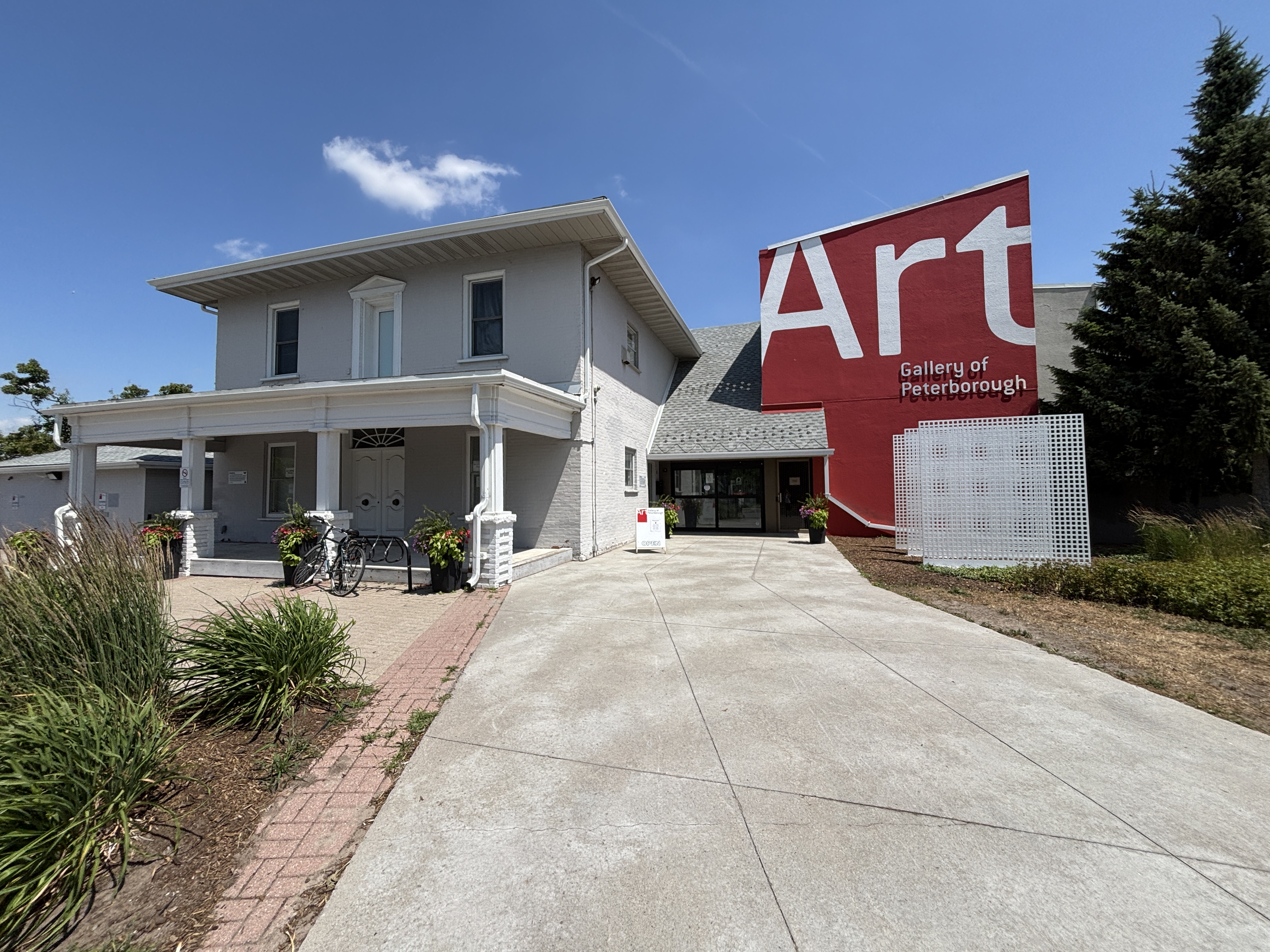
Art Gallery of Peterborough

The YMCA building is a designated architectural landmark.

The Peterborough Museum & Archives was established in 1897 and moved to its site on Armour Hill in 1967. The Archives collection includes items from Catharine Parr Traill, the original Peter Robinson papers, the Park Studio Fonds and the Balsillie collection of Roy Studio Images, over 300,000 film and glass plate negatives dating back to 1896.

Walter Seymour Allward designed a municipal cenotaph, the Peterborough Memorial (1929), Valour Defeating Barbarism.

The Trent–Severn Waterway passes through Peterborough and includes the Peterborough Lift Lock, the world's largest hydraulic lift lock, which opened in 1904. It was for many years the world's highest hydraulic lift lock with a rise of 20 m (65 ft).

Peterborough offers a sightseeing option called Liftlock and River Boat Cruise. This cruise boat takes passengers through the Peterborough Liftlock while broadcasting various facts about the city's sights and history. The cruise operates daily from mid-May to mid-October every year.

Showplace Performance Centre is a 647-seat performance facility located downtown that opened in 1996.

Jackson Park contains old-growth forest with trees up to 250 years old. The 4.5 ha old-growth forest can be visited from the parking area at the north end of Monaghan Rd.

The Riverview Park & Zoo is a 22.5 ha (55.5-acre) zoo operated by the Peterborough Utilities Group at the north end of Water Street. In addition to its animal exhibits, the zoo features a miniature train ride and the park contains a disc golf course.

The Canadian Canoe Museum, located in Peterborough since 1997, relocated to a new facility which opened in 2024. This new 65,000-square-foot building features 600 watercraft and hundreds of other artifacts. It is a national heritage centre that explores the canoe's enduring significance to the peoples of North America.

The Peterborough Skateboard park is one of the largest skateboard parks in Ontario. It includes several half-pipes as well as multiple ramps and rails. Its construction was sponsored by West 49. In 2015 the park was expanded from 8,700 square feet to 17,000 square feet.

The 'Wall Of Honour' monument was recently unveiled in Confederation Park across from City Hall on North George Street. It contains the names of the 11,300 servicemen and women from the Peterborough area who served in Canada's Armed Forces in World War I, World War II and the Korean War.

During the summer, Peterborough is home to the longest-running free admission music fest summer concert series.

=== Downtown ===
Peterborough's downtown is home to locally owned shops and restaurants including music stores, fine dining and jewellery stores.

== Arts and culture ==
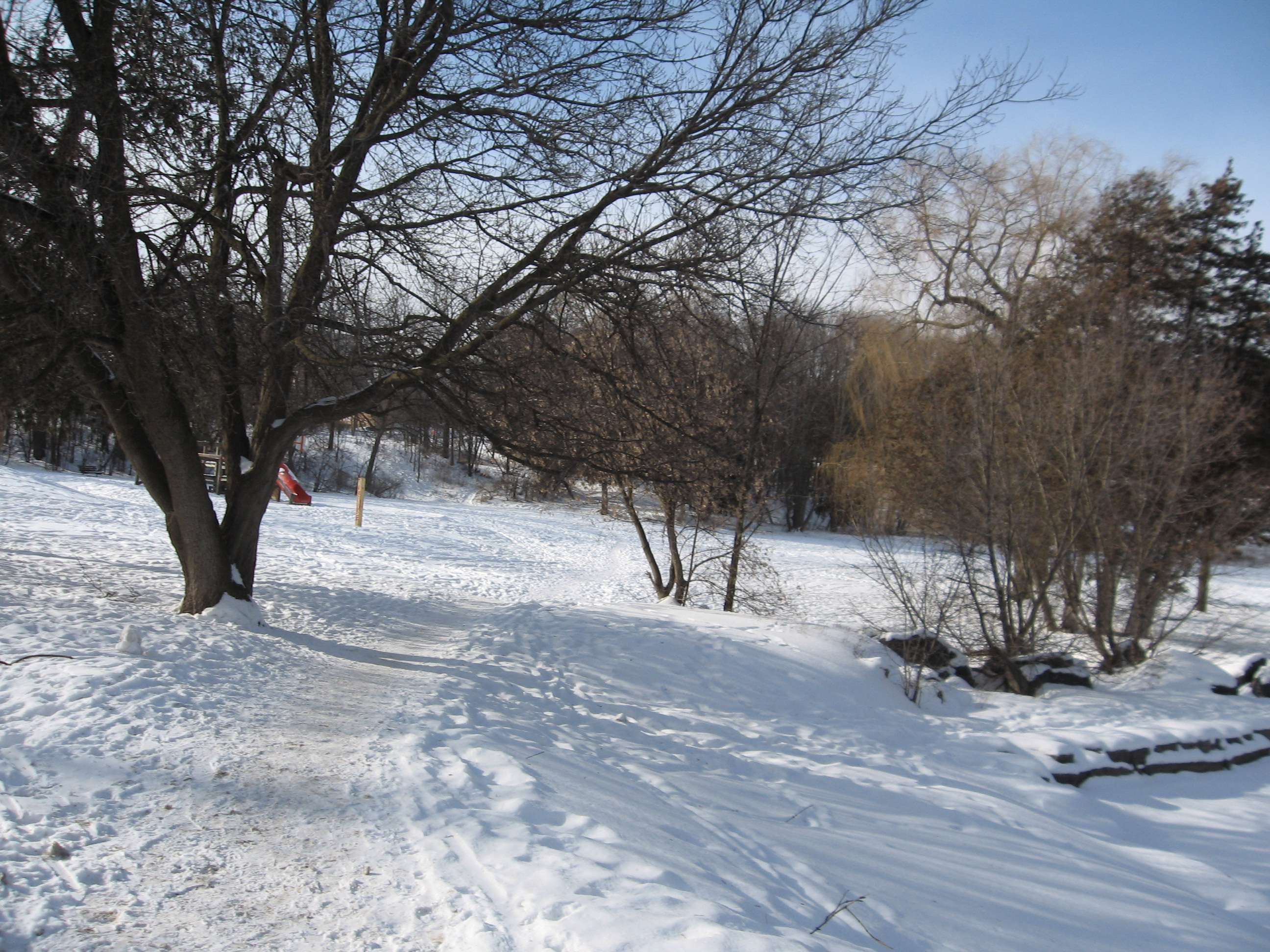
Trans Canada Trail

A portion of the Trent-Severn Canal below the lift lock is flooded and maintained for skating each winter.

Beavermead Campground is located on Little Lake at the centre of Peterborough. Beavermead Campground has 98 individual campsites, 46 un-serviced and 52 serviced. Beavermead has rental options for kayaks and a supervised swimming area. There are multiple athletic fields and public washrooms on the grounds. Beavermead Park hosts the Soul Beach Volleyball program that facilitates games and recreation during the summer months.

The Kawartha String Orchestra recruits musicians from Peterborough and the nearby communities. The orchestra was established around 2015 / 2016 and is composed of string musicians of all ages and backgrounds.

=== Public library ===
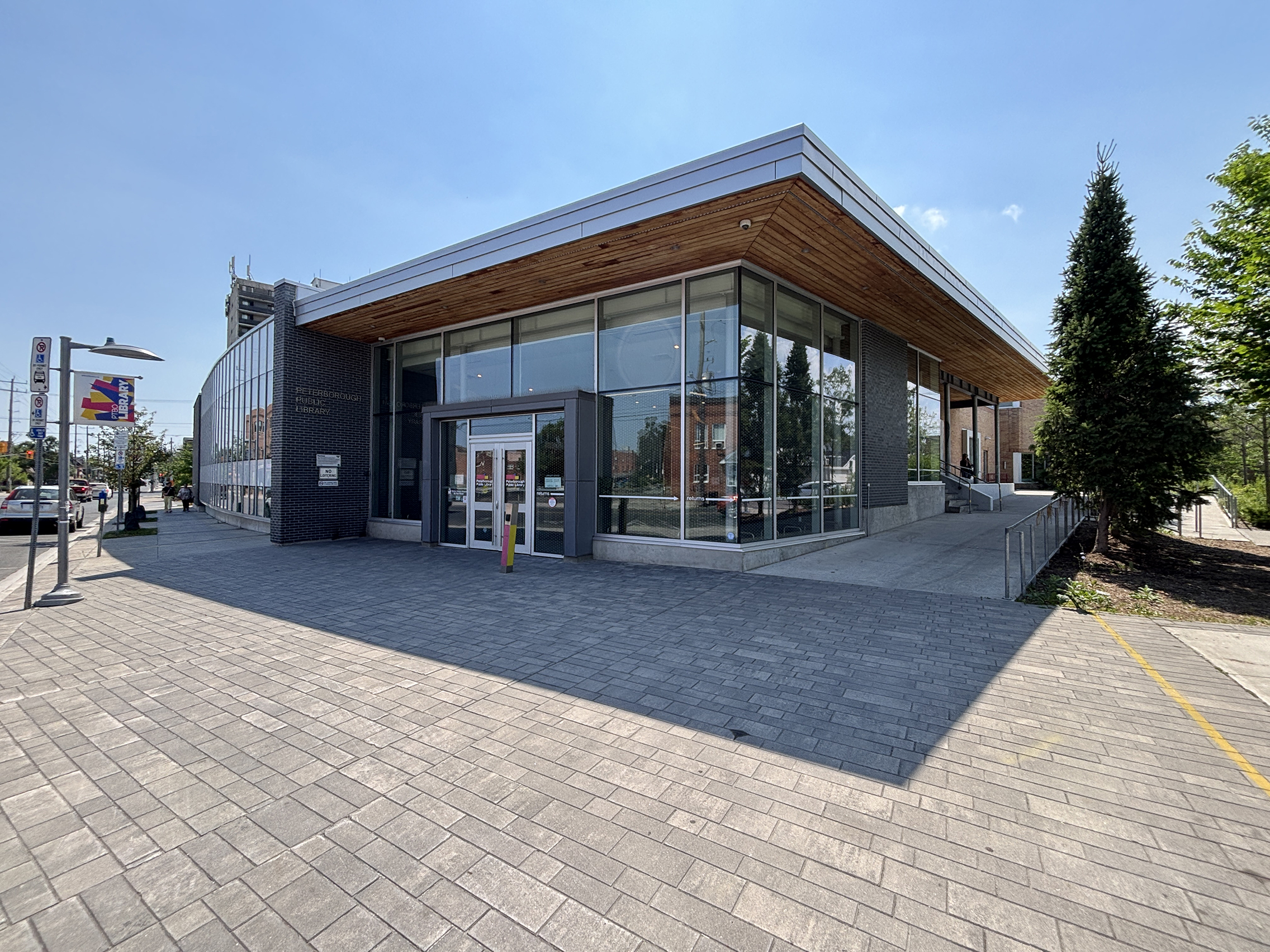
Peterborough's main library

The Peterborough Mechanics Institute, established in 1868, housed a subscription library that allowed members who paid a fee to borrow books. Mechanics Institutes were established across Ontario to make education universal and accessible to all citizens. Later, the Peterborough Public Library received funding from the Andrew Carnegie Foundation a Carnegie Library was erected in 1911. This building is currently the Carnegie Wing of City Hall. In February 1949, a branch library opened in the south end of Peterborough. The DelaFosse Branch Library opened in 1965. A new branch was constructed inside the Miskin Law Community Complex. The main library opened in 1980.

== Sports ==
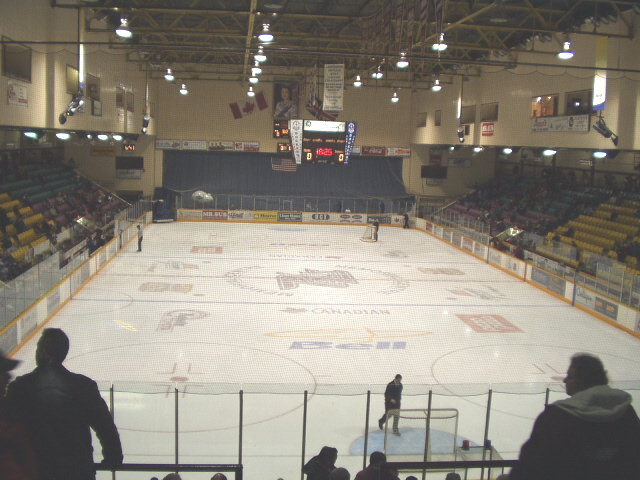
Interior of the Peterborough Memorial Centre before the 2003 renovations

Peterborough has many sports and recreational opportunities.

Peterborough's junior level hockey team, the Peterborough Petes of the Ontario Hockey League, were established in 1956 and have become the longest continuously operating team in the league. They have participated in the Memorial Cup tournament nine times in their history and won it once. The Petes have produced a record number of National Hockey League (NHL) players such as Eric Staal, Jordan Staal, Cory Stillman, Chris Pronger, Steve Yzerman, Bob Gainey, Mike Ricci, Larry Murphy, Tie Domi, Mickey Redmond, Wayne Gretzky (who played three games and achieved three assists), and coaches such as Scotty Bowman, Roger Neilson, Mike Keenan, Gary Green and Dick Todd. They have also graduated 96 players who have played 100 or more games in the NHL.

The Peterborough Memorial Centre, constructed in 1956, is the home of the Peterborough Petes as well as the Peterborough Lakers and was named in honour of the many war veterans who came from the region. It is located at the east of the exhibition grounds at the corner of Lansdowne and George Streets. In 2003, the Memorial Centre was renovated adding 24 box suites, improved concessions, a licensed restaurant, new seats, boards, scoreboard and air conditioning.

Peterborough is also host to the Peterborough Liftlock U11 Hockey Tournament, formerly the Peterborough Liftlock Atom Hockey Tournament. The tournament began in 1958 as a one-day, eight-team event. The tournament expanded in 1969 to a two-day, 16-team event, when Jack Guerin, Lloyd Hardy, Don Dorsett and Howie Eastman made a proposal to the League Executive. Since then, the tournament has grown substantially, hosting 87 teams across four days in 2023.

The city also has a girl hockey association (PGHA) known as the Ice Kats, the PGHA fields approximately 15 representative hockey teams and nine house league teams. Box lacrosse is also popular in the area. Teams include the Major Series Lacrosse Peterborough Sr. A Lakers and the Peterborough Jr. Lakers, who hold a Junior A record of 12 Canadian Minto Cup championships.

Peterborough also participated in an Olympics-like competition with sister city Ann Arbor, Michigan: the Arborough Games were held annually (later biennially), rotating between the cities starting in 1983. It ended, due to a lack of volunteers, after the 2000 edition.

Peterborough is home to a rowing club with programs for learning to row, recreational rowing, as well as competitive regattas. This club is home to Trent University Rowing and hosts many secondary school teams in the area. This club was established in 1977 and is located along the shores of the Otonabee River in the north end of the city.

While in 2021, Electric City FC was founded to play in the semi-professional League1 Ontario and played its home games at Fleming College’s sports complex in 2024 after two seasons of operation the team was permanently disbanded due to declining attendance and ownership mismanagement and sold its license to play in the league to Pickering FC.

PYSC (The Peterborough Youth Soccer Club) offers recreational and competitive soccer for children aged four to 18.

== Government ==
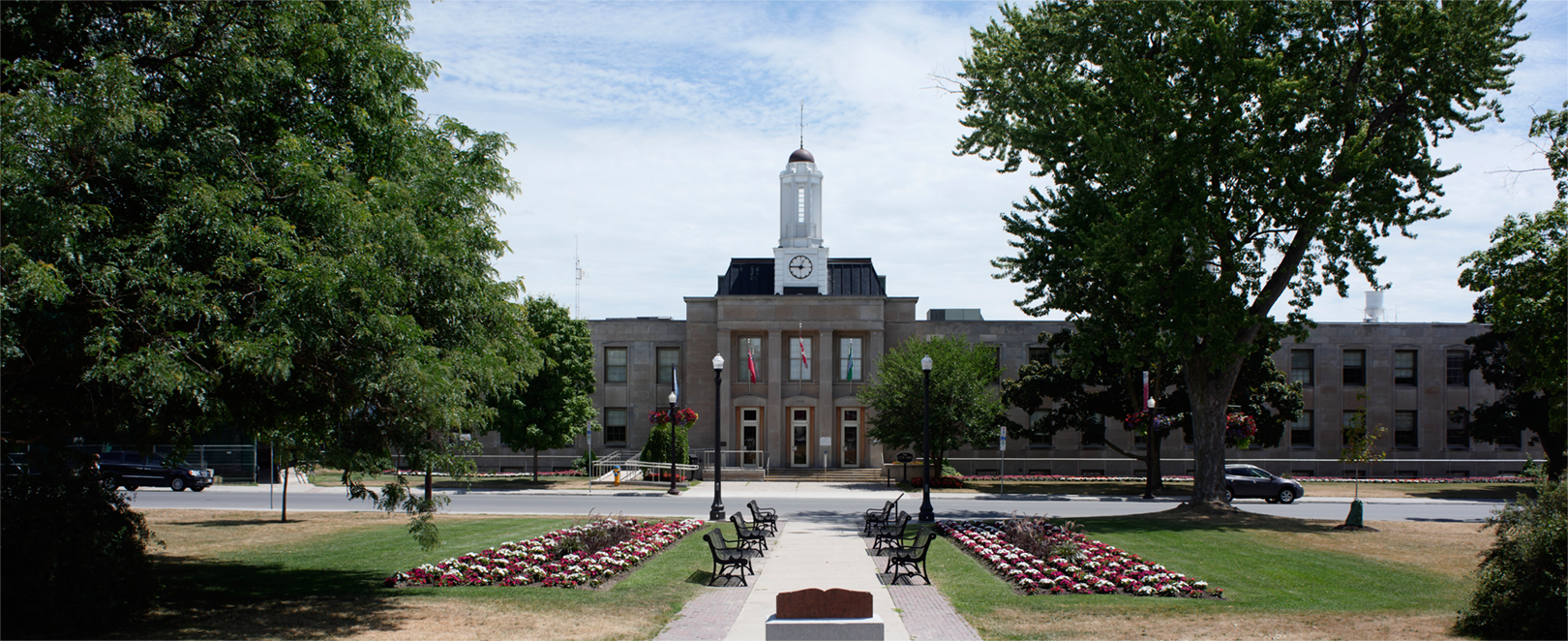
Peterborough's City Hall

Peterborough is a single-tier municipality governed by a mayor-council system. The Mayor of Peterborough, Michael Eamon, was elected by direct popular vote to serve as the chief executive of the city. The Peterborough City Council is a unicameral legislative body, comprising the mayor and ten city councillors representing five geographical wards of the city.

Peterborough City Hall at 500 George Street North in downtown Peterborough houses the municipal government and also the central offices of Peterborough Social Services. The municipal budget for 2008 for the city is projected to be $190.9 million, an increase from 2007's actual expenditures of $185.4 million, or 2.9 percent.

Despite the city being separated from it, the city is also the seat of Peterborough County, with council meetings taking place in the Peterborough County Courthouse. The Peterborough County Court House is located at 470 Water Street and was built between 1838 and 1840 and still holds a portion of the county's offices.

At the provincial level, the riding is held by Dave Smith of the Ontario Progressive Conservative Party, who has held it since the 2018 Ontario election.

On a federal level the riding is held by MP Emma Harrison of the Liberal Party, who won the seat in 2025.

In 2014, MP Dean Del Mastro was found guilty of overspending on his 2008 election campaign. This trial and guilty verdict led to his resignation.

=== Crime ===
Policing in Peterborough is provided by the Peterborough Police Service, located at 500 Water Street. Peterborough Police Services also serves the village of Lakefield and the township of Cavan-Monaghan in Peterborough County.

Peterborough's crime rate in 2013 was 4,489 crimes per 100,000 people, a 3 percent reduction from 2012, according to Statistics Canada. That was the 19th highest crime rate out of Canada's 34 census metropolitan areas. (Peterborough's CMA includes the city and four surrounding townships.)

Peterborough had the sixth lowest crime severity rate in 2013 out of Canada's 34 census metropolitan areas, according to Statistics Canada. Peterborough's crime severity index of 54.4 is a 14% reduction compared to the 2012 rate. Only Toronto, Ottawa, Quebec City, Barrie and Guelph had lower crime severity indexes, according to the survey. None of the census metropolitan areas had increases in crime severity in 2013. The crime severity index is calculated by Statistics Canada and takes into account both the volume and severity, based on average sentences for offenders, of police-reported crime in Canada. Nationally the CSI was down 9% in 2013 compared to 2012 and is 36% lower than ten years ago.

In 2011, Peterborough had the highest rate of hate crimes reported of any Canadian cities. Peterborough retained this position in 2020, with nearly triple the national rate of hate crimes. In November 2015, Peterborough gained nationwide notoriety after an arson took place at the Masjid Al-Salaam mosque. The resulting community response raised over $110,000 for repairs in less than two days. The mosque has since been rebuilt and reopened.

== Infrastructure ==
=== Transportation ===
==== Air ====
Peterborough Airport is located off Highway 115, just south of the city. It is primarily a recreation and business airport, offering no scheduled flights by any airlines. It has two asphalt runways, one 7,000 by 100 ft (2,134 by 30 m) and the other 2,000 by 49 ft (610 by 15 m). The airport services approximately 25,000–30,000 aircraft movements per year.

==== Bridges ====
There are four road bridges that cross the Otonabee River within the city limits of Peterborough. The most northerly one is the Nassau Mills Road Bridge near Trent University. The next most northerly bridge is the Parkhill Road Bridge. The Hunter Street Bridge crosses the river just north of Little Lake, linking East City with the downtown core. The most southerly bridge is the Lansdowne Street Bridge. In addition, Highway 115 crosses the river near the southern edge of the city. There are also numerous other bridges which cross the Trent Canal (notably the crossing at the lift lock which actually passes under the canal), Jackson Creek and the other minor creeks in the city. There are also numerous other river crossings throughout the CMA, the longest of which is the James A. Gifford Causeway, which crosses Chemong Lake linking Bridgenorth with Ennismore.

==== Canals ====
Otonabee River and Trent Canal are part of the Trent–Severn Waterway, providing a link from Lake Ontario to Lake Huron. The canal runs through the very eastern portion of the city and is home to the Peterborough Lift Lock, formerly the highest hydraulic boat lift in the world. The Peterborough Marina is located on Little Lake near where Jackson Creek drains into the lake, beside Del Crary Park and just east of George Street. It contains 90 slips for docking and a host of amenities.

==== Highways ====
Peterborough is served by provincial Highway 115, a freeway that connects the city to Toronto via Highway 401 and Highway 407 East. Provincial Highway 7, part of the Trans-Canada Highway, connects to Lindsay heading west and eventually to Ottawa heading east. Other Provincial Highways important to Peterborough are Highway 7A, which junctions onto Highway 115 just southwest of the city, and Highway 28, which routes from Highway 7 just east of the city to Lakefield and on further north.

==== Public transit ====
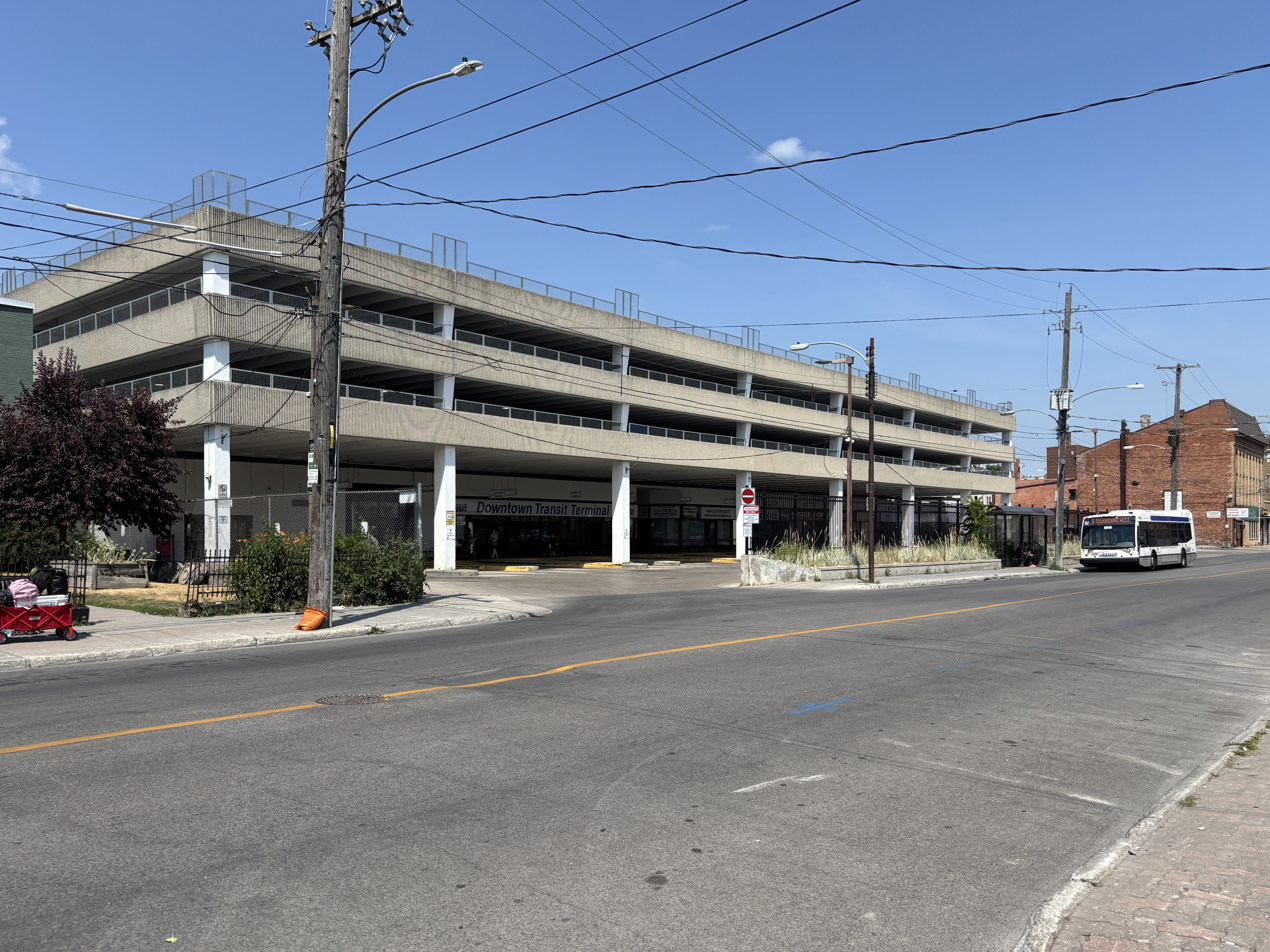
Peterborough Transit Terminal

Public transit in the city of Peterborough is run by Peterborough Transit which runs nine regular bus routes and three colour-coded community bus routes throughout the city. Peterborough Transit's central terminal is located on Simcoe Street in the city's downtown core and includes a customer service desk where passes can be purchased and inquiries can be made during regular business hours. In July 2021, Peterborough city council opted to keep the temporary changes made to the bus routes during the COVID-19 pandemic. This included a change from a radial-based bus network to a grid-based bus network.

Other transit agencies provide service to Peterborough and popular destinations in the region, including Trent University. GO Transit established a bus service from Peterborough to Oshawa starting September 5, 2009 that provides service to Trent University. A rural transit option connecting Curve Lake and Selwyn to Trent University was launched May 3, 2021.

==== Rail ====
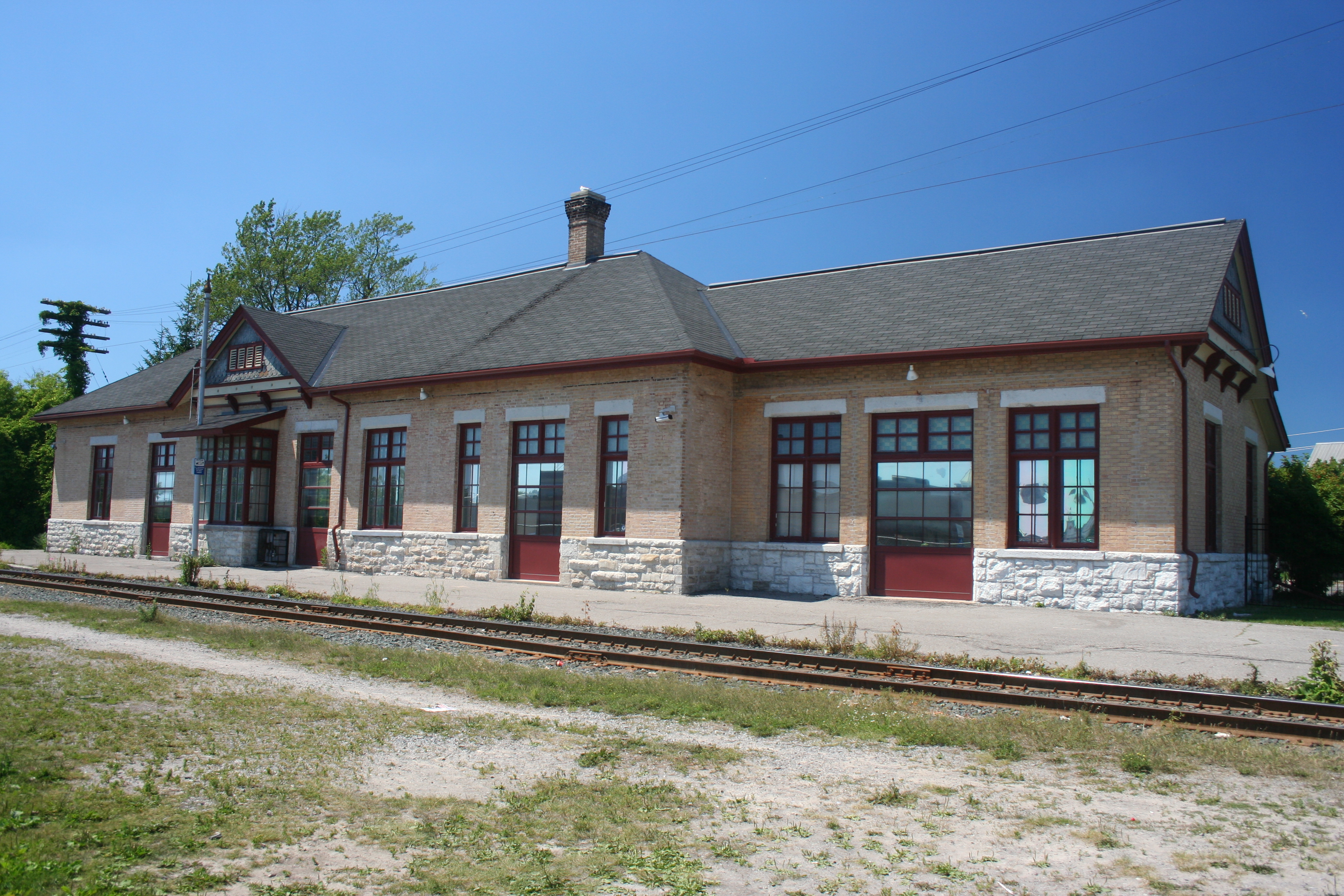
Heritage railway station

Peterborough is served by Canadian Pacific Railway. Via Rail provided train service from Toronto to Havelock via Peterborough from 1978 to 1990. In 2025 the federal government announced plans to reinstate passenger rail service between Toronto and Peterborough as part of a new high-speed rail route between Toronto and Quebec City, making stops in Ottawa, Montréal and Trois-Rivières. The route is proposed to follow existing rail lines not currently used for passenger train travel. Then-MP Dean Del Mastro lobbied for passenger rail to be brought back to the small city, and there has been government funding put aside for a Peterborough–Toronto rail link.

The Peterborough's disused railway station is historically significant for its association with the early development of the Canadian Pacific Railway and its predecessor the Ontario and Quebec Railway.

==== Walking and cycling ====
Peterborough is home to several multi-use trails for exclusive use by pedestrians and cyclists that crisscross the city and connect to destinations like Trent University, rural farmland, and nearby towns or villages. In 2022 the city is considering adopting a cycling master plan that would add to the existing multi-use trails and add or improve bike routes in the city to increase safety, connections, and year-round maintenance to support year-round use.

The Rotary Greenway Trail is a 25-kilometre stretch of multi-use trail with benches, historic, environmental and ecological signage that travels through the city of Peterborough from Little Lake and continues past Trent University to the village of Lakefield in Selwyn Township.

The Jackson Creek Kiwanis trail is a 10 kilometre stretch of the Trans-Canada Trail that connects from Jackson Park in Peterborough to the towns of Hastings and Lindsay. This multi-use path also travels along the Otonabee River through Millennium park.

The Parkway Trail is a 4 kilometres long multi-use trail that runs between Jackson Park and Riverview Park and Zoo.

The Crawford trail is a multi-use trail that is 2 kilometres long and is being extended between Townsend street and Monaghan road.

From the west end of the city along Technology Drive, you can access a parking lot and trailhead for the 33 km Lang-Hastings Trail.

Since 2013 Peterborough's provision of sidewalks policy has required sidewalks be constructed on both sides of any newly constructed street and be provided on both sides of any existing street. This includes a provision to add boulevards where feasible between sidewalks and the roadway to provide a planted buffer between cars and pedestrians.

=== Utilities ===
Peterborough's electricity local distribution company is Hydro One as of April 2020 and was purchased from the Peterborough Utilities Group (PUG), formerly the Peterborough Utilities Commission, for $105 million. Peterborough Utilities continues to provide water to the city and its residents, as well as operate the River Park Zoo where the water filtration plant is also located. It is currently entirely owned by the City of Peterborough. There have been new infrastructure developments that started expanding outside of city water including the development and operation of electricity generation (notably the 8 MW Trent Rapids hydroelectric project [2010] and the 10 MW Lily Lake Solar Farm [2011], which capitalize on the Province of Ontario's feed-in tariff program), telecom services, energy equipment rentals, and commercial metering services both in Peterborough and throughout the province. Natural gas for heating is provided locally by Enbridge Inc.

=== Healthcare ===
Peterborough is home to the Peterborough Regional Health Centre which serves Peterborough, Peterborough County, Northumberland County, the City of Kawartha Lakes, Haliburton County, and Hastings County. It is located at 1 Hospital Drive and, prior to the completion of its new facility in June 2008, also provided some services from the old St. Joseph's site at 384 Rogers Street. The PRHC is part of the Central East Local Health Integration Network, provides 400 beds and houses one of the busiest emergency departments in Ontario. Peterborough is home to four methadone clinics and many centres for addiction treatment and counselling.

== Education ==
=== School boards in Peterborough ===
The Kawartha Pine Ridge District School Board (KPRDSB) is the public English language school board that serves the local area. Its headquarters are located at 1994 Fisher Drive, Peterborough. Over 35,000 students attend its schools and it encompasses almost 7,000 square kilometres, taking the place of the former Peterborough County Board of Education and Northumberland-Clarington Board of Education. It stretches from the north of Peterborough County south to Lake Ontario, and from Hastings County in the east to the City of Kawartha Lakes and the City of Oshawa in the west. As of 2010, the KPRDSB operates 82 elementary schools, 15 secondary schools and four adult learning centres serving both the urban area and the outlying rural communities. Of those, 16 elementary schools, five secondary schools and one adult learning centre are located within the city. The Board offers a French Immersion program where students learn French and English through elementary and secondary school; in Peterborough, five elementary schools and one high school host this program.

The Peterborough Victoria Northumberland and Clarington Catholic District School Board is the Separate English language school board for the region. It is headquartered at 1355 Lansdowne Street West, Peterborough, and presently operates 33 elementary schools and five secondary schools. Of these, nine elementary and two secondary schools operate within the city.

The Conseil scolaire de district catholique Centre-Sud is the Separate French language school board for the South-Central region of Ontario, which includes Peterborough. It presently operates 41 elementary schools and eight secondary schools, of which the only school in Peterborough is the elementary school Monseigneur-Jamot.

=== Post-secondary institutions ===
==== Trent University ====
Established in 1964, Trent University is a small liberal arts- and science-oriented institution. Trent's academic focus is on environmental, cultural and science studies. The main Symons Campus of Trent, located in the city's far north end, is approximately 14.6 km^{2} (5.6 sq mi), over half of which is a part of Trent's Nature Areas, an ecologically diverse wildlife nature reserve.

Trent University operates largely through its colleges: Champlain, Lady Eaton, Catharine Parr Traill, Otonabee, Peter Gzowski. Each college has its own residence halls, dining room and student government.

==== Fleming College ====
Established in 1967, Fleming College (formerly Sir Sandford Fleming College), is a multidisciplinary institution with two primary campuses within the city of Peterborough:

Sutherland Campus is located on Brealey Drive in the city's west end, and has recently undergone a massive expansion. The new St. Joseph's at Fleming is the first long-term care facility to be built on a college or university campus. In 2005, the Peterborough Sport & Wellness Centre was constructed to accommodate the college's athletic needs.

McRae Campus was located in a renovated textile mill located on McDonnel Street near Monaghan Road. Formerly the School of Continuing Education and Skilled Trades, the campus closed in 2014 when the Kawartha Trades and Technology Centre opened on the Sutherland Campus.

The college also operates satellite campuses in nearby Lindsay, Cobourg and Haliburton.

==== Kawartha Lakes Bible College ====
Kawartha Lakes Bible College (KLBC) is a small evangelical Bible college affiliated with the Plymouth Brethren. The school opened in 1973, and moved to its current location in 2001. It closed in 2005.

==== Master's College and Seminary ====
Master's College and Seminary is a Pentecostal Christian institution of higher education that consists of an on-campus bible college, a church-based seminary, and a global distance education program. The school has partnerships with Trent University and Tyndale University College and Seminary.

== Media ==
Peterborough is home to a disproportionately large number of radio stations compared to centres closer to Toronto. This is due in part to Peterborough's central location in a valley. Peterborough is also home to a single television station, CHEX-DT, which is the local Global O&O; as well as TVCogeco, a local cable television channel operated by Cogeco Cable. Peterborough has two main newspapers, the Peterborough Examiner, which publishes six days a week except Sunday; and Peterborough This Week, which publishes every Thursday. A non-political publication called SNAP Peterborough is published monthly with sections for home, business, sporting events, etc. with a main focus on providing friendly and photographic news.

== Sister cities ==
- Ann Arbor, Michigan, United States, since 1983

== Notable people ==
- Sandford Fleming, inventor, came to the town in the late 1840s and said it was "rather a poor little place".
- Catherine Parr Traill, the author of The Backwoods of Canada, was an early settler.
- Lester B. Pearson, a former Prime Minister, attended local school PCVS.

== See also ==
- Coat of arms of Peterborough, Ontario
