= BCI =

BCI or bci may refer to:

== Organizations ==
- Bar Council of India
- Barts Cancer Institute, United Kingdom
- Bat Conservation International
- Battery Council International, an American trade association
- Ohio Bureau of Criminal Investigation, an investigative law enforcement agency of the U.S. state of Ohio
- BCI Bus, an Australian bus and coach manufacturing company
- BCI Engineers & Scientists, formerly Bromwell & Carrier
- Better Cotton Initiative
- Bonobo Conservation Initiative
- British Columbia Investment Management Corporation
- Broadcasting Commission of Ireland
- Broward Correctional Institution, United States
- Business Continuity Institute, United Kingdom

=== Banks ===
- Banco de Crédito e Inversiones, a Chilean bank
- Banca Commerciale Italiana, a defunct Italian bank
- Banco Comercial e de Investimentos; see List of banks in Mozambique
- Bank of the Cook Islands

=== Education ===
- Benedict XVI Catholic Institute, Negombo, Sri Lanka
- Bluevale Collegiate Institute, Canada
- Brantford Collegiate Institute, Canada
- Brockville Collegiate Institute, Canada
- Bahria College Islamabad, Pakistan

== Science ==
- Brain–computer interface, a connection between brain and computer
- Boa constrictor imperator
- Book Citation Index
- Bulk Current Injection, a method of radio frequency immunity testing for devices

== Other uses ==
- Barro Colorado Island, a man-made island in Panama
- Black Crown Initiate, an American metal band
- Baoulé language (ISO 639-3 code: bci)
- Barcaldine Airport (IATA code: BCI)

== See also ==
- BBCi (disambiguation)
- BCCI (disambiguation)
