= Diane Therrien =

Canadian politician

62nd Mayor of Peterborough
- In office December 1, 2018 – November 15, 2022
- Preceded by: Daryl Bennett
- Succeeded by: Jeff Leal

Personal details
- Born: 1984 (age 41–42) Mississauga, Ontario, Canada
- Party: Independent
- Education: Trent University; McMaster University

Diane Therrien (born 1986) is a Canadian politician who served as the 62nd mayor of Peterborough from 2018 to 2022. She was elected in the 2018 Ontario municipal elections. Prior to her mayoral election, she was a city councillor for Ward 3 (Town Ward) from 2014 to 2018.

Prior to her political career, Therrien worked for Ontario's Ministry of Aboriginal Affairs and for the Peterborough Poverty Reduction Network.

== Early life and education ==
Therrien was born in Mississauga and started studying history and peace studies at McMaster University when she was 17 years old. After getting a bachelor's degree from McMaster University, she obtained her master's degree Trent University, where she studied Canadian Indigenous issues.

== Career ==
After graduation, Therrien worked at the Ministry of Aboriginal Affairs in Toronto, and for three years as a facilitator of community education at the Peterborough Poverty Reduction Network.

Prior to her mayoral election, she was a city councillor for Ward 3 (Town Ward) from 2014 to 2018.

Therrien was elected as mayor of Peterborough in the 2018 Ontario municipal elections. Therrien is the third woman to be mayor of the city.

On August 13, 2019, Peterborough City Council unanimously passed a by-law to eliminate camping in City Parks. Therrien announced that she would not allow the police to enforce the bylaws as written. 1,751 members of the local community signed a petition requesting the removal of Tent City, a homeless encampment. The total expense for police patrols of the area in 2019 was more than $86,000. On February 14, 2022, Therrien asked Deputy Mayor Andrew Beamer to serve as acting mayor while she took a leave of absence for health reasons.

In 2021, Therrien announced she would not run for re-election. She had been rumoured to run for the Ontario New Democratic Party in the 2022 Ontario general election, but decided to not run. In 2022, Therrien was involved in a minor controversy after using the phrase "fuck off, you fuckwads," in response to supporters of QAnon conspiracy theorist Romana Didulo attempting to detain members of the city's police force.

Her mayoral term ended in November 2022.
