= List of mayors of Peterborough, Ontario =

Municipal post

Mayor of Peterborough
- Municipal logo
- Incumbent; Michael Eamon since November 19, 2026
- City of Peterborough; Mayor's Office
- Style: His/Her Worship; Mayor (informal)
- Member of: Peterborough City Council
- Seat: Peterborough City Hall
- Appointer: Direct election
- Term length: 4 years; Renewable
- Constituting instrument: Ontario Municipal Act, 2001
- Formation: 1850; 176 years ago
- First holder: Thomas Benson
- Salary: $84,841
- Website: www.peterborough.ca/council-city-hall/mayor-and-council/mayors-office/

The mayor of Peterborough is an elected official who serves as the head of the municipal government of Peterborough, Ontario. The mayor is a member of Peterborough City Council, which is responsible for developing municipal policies, programs and services, representing constituents, and overseeing the governance of the municipal corporation. As head of council, the mayor presides over council meetings, serves as the municipality's chief executive officer and acts as its official representative.

Following Peterborough's incorporation as a town on January 1, 1850, municipal councillors were elected annually in January and selected a mayor, reeve and deputy reeve from among themselves. Thomas Benson was appointed the town's first mayor in 1850. Beginning in 1860, the mayor was elected directly by voters, with Augustus Sawers becoming the first to hold office under the new system.

On July 1, 1905, the Town of Peterborough amalgamated with the neighbouring Village of Ashburnham and was incorporated as the City of Peterborough. As a result, Peterborough Town Council was succeeded by Peterborough City Council.

Municipal elections are held every four years, with voters electing the mayor and councillors representing their respective wards. The mayor serves a four-year term and may seek re-election without restriction, as there are no term limits for municipal officeholders in Ontario.

== List of Peterborough Mayors ==
=== Peterborough Town Council (1850–1905) ===
Mayors of the Town of Peterborough (1850–1905)
No.	Portrait	Mayor	Term began	Term ended	Notes
1		Thomas Benson	1850	1850	First mayor of Peterborough; elected by town council.
2		Charles Hudson	1851	1851	
3		James Hall	1852	1852	
4		James Stevenson	1853	1853	
5		James Hall	1854	1855	
6		Wilson Seymour Conger	1856	1856	Served as sheriff of Peterborough County (1850–1856), warden of Peterborough County (1859) and member of Parliament for Peterborough (1856–1864).
7		James Stevenson	1857	1859	
8		Augustus Sawers	1860	1860	First mayor elected directly by voters.
9		Charles Perry	1861	May 1865	Disqualified from office under the Insolvent Act, 1864.
10		William Adam Scott	May 1865	December 1865	Elected in a by-election held on May 22–23, 1865, defeating Robert Nicholls by 196 votes to 99.
11		William Hepburn Scott	1866	1871	Also served as a member of the Legislative Assembly of Ontario.
12		George Albertus Cox	1872	1874	
13		William Toole	1875	1878	
14		John James Lundy	1879	1880	
15		Henry Hall Smith	1881	1883	
16		George Albertus Cox	1884	1885	
17		James Stevenson	1886	1891	
18		James Kendry	1892	1895	
19		William Yelland	1896	1897	
20		Alfred Lawrence Davis	1898	1899	
21		James Kendry	1900	1900	
22		T. H. G. Denne	1901	1902	
23		George M. Roger	1903	1904	

=== Peterborough City Council (1905-present) ===
Mayors of the City of Peterborough (1905–present)
No.	Portrait	Mayor	Term began	Term ended	Notes
24		Henry Best	1905	1906	First mayor of the City of Peterborough, following its incorporation on July 1, 1905.
25		R. F. McWilliams	1907	1907	
26		H. Rush	1908	1909	
27		W. George Morrow	1910	1911	
28		William H. Bradburn	1912	1913	
29		William H. Buller	1914	1915	
30		Joseph James Duffus	1916	1917	
31		George H. Duncan	1918	1919	
32		A. A. McIntyre	1920	1921	
33		William H. Taylor	1922	1923	
34		J. J. Turner	1924	1925	
35		W. T. Holloway	1926	1927	
36		Roland Denne	1928	1935	
37		George A. Macdonald	1936	1940	
38		James Hamilton	1941	1945	
39		William G. Ovens	1946	1948	
40		Maxwell J. Swanston	1949	1951	
41		H. F. Waddell	1952	1953	
42		N. G. Graham	1954	December 1954	Died in office.
43		A. B. Burrows	December 1954	1954	Appointed to succeed N. G. Graham following his death.
44		J. A. Dewart	1955	1958	
45		D. A. Louks	1959	1960	
46		Stanley A. McBride	1961	October 1962	Resigned to become sheriff.
47		Alene Holt	October 1962	1962	Appointed to succeed Stanley A. McBride following his resignation, becoming Peterborough's first female mayor.
48		Clarence W. Boorman	1963	October 1964	Died in office.
49		W. G. Powell	October 1964	1966	Appointed to succeed Clarence W. Boorman following his death.
50		Joseph J. Behan	1967	1968	
51		J. D. Csumrlk	1969	1970	
52		P. Douglas Galvin	1971	1971	
53		Philip H. Turner	1972	1974	
54		Joseph J. Behan	1975	1976	
55		Cameron D. Wasson	1977	1980	
56		R. J. Barker	1981	1985	
57		Sylvia Sutherland	1986	1991	First woman elected mayor of Peterborough.
58		J. A. Doris	1992	1997	
59		Sylvia Sutherland	1998	2006	
60		D. Paul Ayotte	2007	December 1, 2010	
61		Daryl Bennett	December 1, 2010	November 26, 2018	
62		Diane Therrien	November 26, 2018	November 15, 2022	
63		Jeff Leal	November 15, 2022	November 19, 2026	
64		Michael Eamon	November 19, 2026	Incumbent	
