= BCCI =

BCCI may refer to:

- Bank of Credit and Commerce International, liquidated bank involved in massive money laundering and other financial crimes
- Board of Control for Cricket in India, the governing body for cricket in India
  - BCCI Awards, annual cricket honours
- Bursa Chamber of Commerce and Industry, a professional association in Bursa, Turkey

== See also ==
- BCI (disambiguation)
- BBCI
