= 2026 Ontario municipal elections in Southern Ontario =

Local election in Ontario, Canada

Municipal elections were held in the Canadian province of Ontario on October 26, 2026.

This is an outline of the electoral races in the southern part of the province, organized by county, regional municipality and single-tier municipality.

== Single-tier municipalities ==
In Ontario, single-tier municipalities are municipalities without an upper-level of government.

=== Barrie ===
List of candidates in Barrie:

==== Mayor ====
2026 Barrie municipal election
- October 26, 2026
- Turnout: 30.21%
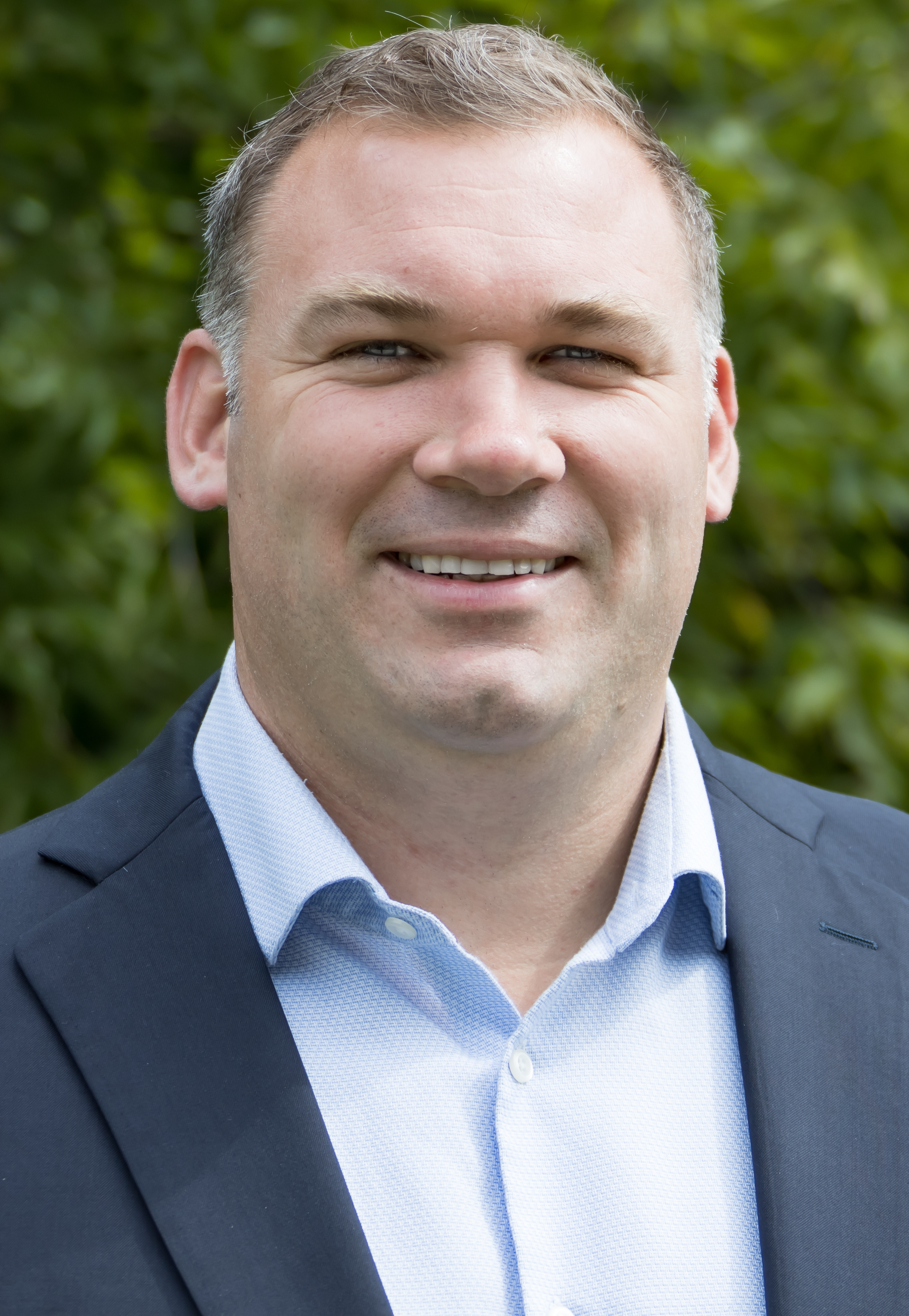
		TS	RT
Nominee	Alex Nuttall	Tanya Saari	Russell Tighe
Popular vote	26,054	9,898	2,419
Percentage	66.62%	25.31%	6.19%
- Barrie's new ward map to be first used for the 2026 election
Mayor before election
Alex Nuttall
Elected mayor
Alex Nuttall

Mayor Alex Nuttall announced on May 5 that he intended on running for re-election. He was challenged by small businesswoman Tanya Saari, new Barrie resident Kay Sayer, and hospitality businessman Russell Tighe.

Mayoral Candidate	Vote	%
Alex Nuttall (X)	26,054	66.62%
Tanya Saari	9,898	25.31%
Russell Tighe	2,419	6.19%
Kay Sayer	737	1.88%

==== Barrie City Council ====
The candidates for Barrie City Council are as follows.

Ward 1
Candidate	Vote	%
Paulene Stevenson	2,038	43.12%
Shaughna Ainsworth	1,027	21.73%
Stefano Agostino	892	18.87%
Brent Bowser	540	11.43%
Christian Cadera	117	2.47%
Hafiz Rahman	112	2.37%

Ward 2
Candidate	Vote	%
Craig Nixon (X)	1,776	45.47%
Shanicka Edwards	973	24.71%
Frank Casera	543	13.90%
Tracy Strohm	377	9.65%
Ajmal Noushahi	237	6.07%

Ward 3
Candidate	Vote	%
Amy Courser (X)	2,540	48.00%
Ben Hughes	1,242	23.47%
Bryan Jones	1,125	21.26%
Ryan Rijo	385	7.28%

Ward 4
Candidate	Vote	%
Arif Khan	1,801	41.34%
Lori Galeazza	1,161	26.65%
Matthew Corbett	665	15.26%
Iradat Ahmad	552	12.67%
Patrick Harriott-Stewart	178	4.09%

Ward 5
Candidate	Vote	%
Robert Thompson (X)	3,346	77.65%
Duarte Da Silva	963	22.35%

Ward 6
Candidate	Vote	%
Nigussie Nigussie (X)	3,047	68.92%
Christel Pena	1,115	25.22%
Nader Nasar George	259	5.85%

Ward 7
Candidate	Vote	%
Gary Harvey (X)	2,085	83.57%
Michael Lewis	410	16.43%

Ward 8
Candidate	Vote	%
Jim Harris (X)	1,852	63.25%
Amanda Fellows	862	29.44%
Samina Alim	214	7.31%

Ward 9
Candidate	Vote	%
Sergio Morales (X)	1,612	48.15%
Norm Costello	1,376	41.10%
Dave Weingarten	280	8.36%
Asmar Naveed	80	2.39%

Ward 10
Candidate	Vote	%
Bryn Hamilton (X)	1,975	74.14%
Georgy Kapustin	389	14.60%
William Cadeau	300	11.26%

=== Belleville ===
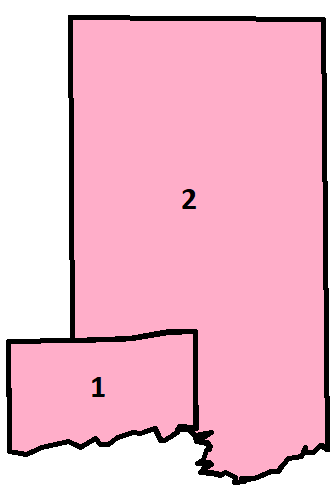
Map of Belleville's wards

The candidates for mayor of Belleville and for Belleville County Council were as follows:

==== Mayor ====
Mayor Neil Ellis announced on May 1 that he was running for re-election. Running against him were comedian Kyle Woolven, co-leader of the People Minded Business consulting firm Paul Fleming and Don Metzger, whose background spans trades, the automotive sector, and non-profit housing.

Mayoral Candidate	Vote	%
Paul Fleming	8,233	49.15
Neil Ellis (X)	7,492	44.73
Kyle Woolven	597	3.56
Don Metzger	428	2.56

==== Belleville City Council ====
Ward 1 - Belleville 6 to be elected
Candidate	Vote	%
Barbara Enright-Miller (X)	5,879	10.27
Sean Kelly (X)	5,591	9.77
Garnet Thompson (X)	5,208	9.10
Lori Borthwick	4,588	8.02
Magaret Seu (X)	4,246	7.42
Kelly Henderson (X)	4,237	7.40
Alex Bruce	4,085	7.14
Hazzem Koudsi	3,838	6.71
Ryan Hilmi	3,256	5.69
Paul Bell	2,822	4.93
Carrie Lough	2,818	4.92
Ted Barfett	2,704	4.72
Cathy Polan	2,323	4.06
Maury Flunder	2,310	4.04
Jeremy T. Davis	1,899	3.32
Cadi Pontinen	1,435	2.51

Ward 2 - Thurlow 2 to be elected
Candidate	Vote	%
Paul Carr (X)	3,073	41.00
Kathryn Brown (X)	2,376	31.70
Aaron Fagan	1,127	15.03
Stephen Scott	920	12.27

=== Brant, County of ===
List of candidates in the County of Brant:

==== Mayor ====
Mayor David Bailey announced he is not running for re-election. Running to replace him was Ward 1 councillor Jennifer Kyle, former councillor Christine Garneau Bisaillon, farmer and farm equipment mechanic Graham Horner, 2022 mayoral candidate David Swanson, and former Canadian Mental Health Association supervisor Stuart Braid.

Mayoral Candidate	Vote	%
Jennifer Kyle	7,544	61.15
Christine Garneau Bisaillon	3,094	25.08
Graham Horner	699	5.67
David Swanson	422	3.42
Stuart Braid	412	3.34
Kent Hollett	165	1.34

==== Brant County Council ====
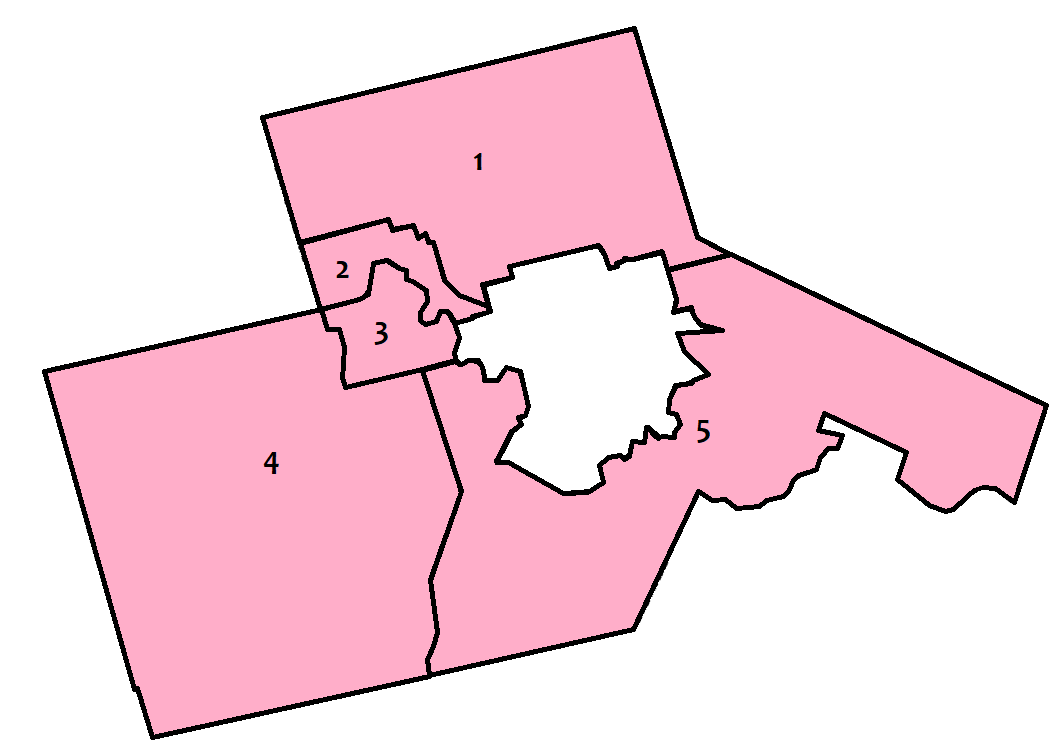
Map of the County of Brant's five wards

The candidates for Brant County Council are as follows. Two to be elected from each ward.

Ward 1
Candidate	Vote	%
John MacAlpine (X)	1,377	30.81
Steve Schmitt	1,095	24.50
Mike Petrella	734	16.42
Mary-Jane Brown	624	13.96
John Kemp	374	8.37
Denise Louise Dyment	266	5.95

Ward 2
Candidate	Vote	%
Steve Howes (X)	1,820	46.96
James McCulloch	1,405	36.25
Jeff Johnston	651	16.80

Ward 3
Candidate	Vote	%
John Peirce (X)	1,351	26.11
John Bell (X)	1,121	21.67
Emad Yosif	725	14.01
Arooj Shaikh	649	12.54
Clifford Atfield	641	12.39
David Spencer	457	8.83
Riley Mulholland	230	4.45

Ward 4
Candidate	Vote	%
Robert Chambers (X)	1,120	28.33
Ben Clement	943	23.86
Elaine Tully	491	12.42
Andrea Bowden	451	11.41
Heather Keam	358	9.06
Corey Donn	316	7.99
Glenn Hughes	168	4.25
Claudine Craigie	106	2.68

Ward 5
Candidate	Vote	%
Ella Haley (X)	1,694	43.89
Mike Gatopoulos	1,349	34.95
Sonia Brown	817	21.17

=== Brantford ===
List of candidates:

==== Mayor ====
2026 Brantford Mayoral election
- October 26, 2026
Candidate	Richard Carpenter	Rose Sicoli	Dan McCreary
Popular vote	13,134	4,530	4,374
Percentage	45.15%	15.57%	15.04%
Candidate	Mandy Samwell	Ricky Willdy
Popular vote	4,027	2,660
Percentage	13.84%	9.14%
Mayor before election
Kevin Davis
Elected mayor
Richard Carpenter

Incumbent mayor Kevin Davis did not run for re-election. Running to replace him were Ward 3 councillor Dan McCreary, Ward 5 councillor Mandy Samwell, ward 4 councillor Richard Carpenter, Ward 1 councillor Rose Sicoli, pro wrestler Ricky Willdy, and genocide advocate and perennial candidate Leslie Bory

Mayoral Candidate	Vote	%
Richard Carpenter	13,134	45.15
Rose Sicoli	4,530	15.57
Dan McCreary	4,374	15.04
Mandy Samwell	4,027	13.84
Ricky Willdy	2,660	9.14
Leslie Bory	239	0.82
Richard Michael Misura	128	0.44

==== Brantford City Council ====
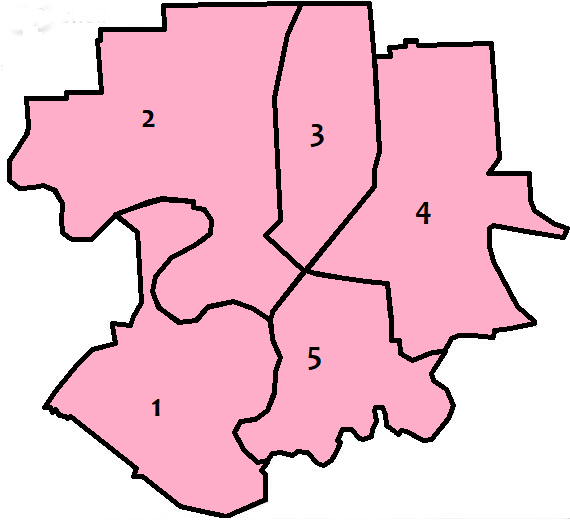
Map of Brantford's five wards

The results for Brantford City Council were as follows. Two elected from each ward.

Ward 1
Candidate	Vote	%
Darryl Casey	2,723	29.54
Bob Sproul	2,364	25.65
Michael Sullivan (X)	2,239	24.29
Nick Singh	1,027	11.14
Michael Boucher	864	9.37

Ward 2
Candidate	Vote	%
Dave Malcolm	3,022	27.21
Gino Caputo (X)	2,443	22.00
Mark Littell	1,920	17.29
Erica James	1,905	17.15
Dave Wrobel	1,817	16.36

Ward 3
Candidate	Vote	%
Trevor J. Cherewka	2,432	20.81
Arron Jeavons	2,150	18.39
Andrew Davis	1,519	13.00
Kailee Poisson	1,346	11.52
Mark St. Angelo	1,306	11.17
Rod Philpot	851	7.28
Gordon Riches	798	6.83
Don Skater	534	4.57
Mike Clancy	480	4.11
Frank Kohlberger	272	2.33

Ward 4
Candidate	Vote	%
Linda Hunt (X)	3,411	38.17
Nicole Callander	2,789	31.21
Nicole Durnford	1,305	14.60
Colleen Goupil	1,075	12.03
Al Moscoe	357	3.99

Ward 5
Candidate	Vote	%
Karleigh Csodras	2,083	32.96
Brian Van Tilborg (X)	2,082	32.94
Mandy Stelling	945	14.95
Dan Thompson	638	10.09
Robert Stanley Harland	572	9.05

=== Brockville ===
==== Mayor ====
Mayor Matt Wren did not run for re-election. Former Elizabethtown-Kitley councillor Tom Linton, and city councillor Cameron Wales ran for mayor.

The candidates for mayor of Brockville are as follows:

Mayoral Candidate	Vote	%
Cameron Wales	4,895	67.24
Tom Linton	2,385	32.76

=== Chatham-Kent ===
Registered candidates in Chatham-Kent.

==== Mayor ====
2026 Chatham-Kent Mayoral election
- October 26, 2026
- Turnout: 40.79%
	MB	DC
Candidate	Michael Bondy	Darrin Canniff
Popular vote	15,818	11,501
Percentage	43.44%	31.59%
	LA
Candidate	Lauren Anderson	Randy Hope
Popular vote	4,983	2,818
Percentage	13.69%	7.74%
Mayor before election
Darrin Canniff
Elected mayor
Michael Bondy

Mayor Darrin Canniff ran for re-election. He was opposed by municipal councillors Michael Bondy and Lauren Anderson, as well as farmer Nelson Burm, supply chain professional Ryan Gow, and former mayor Randy Hope.

Mayoral Candidate	Vote	%
Michael Bondy	15,818	43.44
Darrin Canniff (X)	11,501	31.59
Lauren Anderson	4,983	13.69
Randy Hope	2,818	7.74
April Colby	570	1.57
Nelson Burm	469	1.29
Ryan Gow	251	0.69

==== Chatham-Kent Municipal Council ====
Chatham-Kent's new ward map

Chatham-Kent Municipal Council has reduced in size to 14, down from 17, and has dramatically altered its ward boundaries as a result.

Ward 1 - South West Kent 2 to be elected
Candidate	Vote	%
Mark Authier	2,998	41.19
Melissa Harrigan (X)	1,653	22.71
Gerhard Taves	905	12.43
Michael Bond	840	11.54
Andréa Palmer	535	7.35
Tom Askew	348	4.78

Ward 2 - South East Kent 2 to be elected
Candidate	Vote	%
Anthony Ceccacci (X)	3,190	30.13
Albert Pilbeam	2,802	24.69
Brad Snobelen	2,097	19.80
Matthew Giffin	761	7.19
Chad Carnie	479	4.52
Matt Lamarche	391	3.69
Spencer Stinson	368	3.48
Denise Maynard	328	3.10
Fred Hooper	114	1.08
Hassan Tariq	59	0.56

Ward 3 - North East Kent 1 to be elected
Candidate	Vote	%
Emery Huszka	1,052	46.04
Lauren Aziz	397	17.37
Mark Huston	356	15.58
Cory Couture	248	10.85
Kyle Carter	145	6.35
James Plunkett	45	1.97
Matthew Pietens	42	1.84

Ward 4 - North West Kent 1 to be elected
Candidate	Vote	%
Rhonda Jubenville (X)	1,436	47.90
John Cummings	1,287	42.93
Kirk Hooker	275	9.17

Ward 5 - Wallaceburg & Area 2 to be elected
Candidate	Vote	%
Jim Blake	1,467	21.55
Bill Wolsing	959	14.09
Zac Nicholson	793	11.65
Brendan Authier	698	10.26
Chris Young	519	7.63
Mark Childs	421	6.19
Loree Bailey	411	6.04
David Hyatt	335	4.92
Dave Brundritt	308	4.53
Jason Debuck	242	3.56
Steven Burritt	241	3.54
Victoria Stewart	225	3.31
Brent DeNure	127	1.87
Bill Arends	60	0.88

Ward 6 - North West Chatham 2 to be elected
Candidate	Vote	%
Alysson Storey (X)	2,606	24.98
F. Brian Machado	1,964	18.83
Ben Labadie	1,738	16.66
Jeff Comiskey	1,717	16.46
Sheila Moir-Martin	1,423	13.64
Dave Palmer	331	3.17
Karen Montgomery	323	3.10
Bonny Pigeon	221	2.12
Marc Westerman	109	1.04

Ward 7 - North East Chatham 2 to be elected
Candidate	Vote	%
Steve Kenney	2,318	23.34
Amy Finn (X)	1,551	15.62
Marjorie Crew (X)	1,367	13.76
Penelope Duchesne	675	6.80
Steve Adkins	674	6.79
Karen Robinet	518	5.22
Dustin Ryan	459	4.62
Doug Robbins	423	4.26
Larry Hutchins	380	3.83
Michael Fife	331	3.33
Dale VanDusen	290	2.92
Jason Reynolds	265	2.67
Michael Gibbons	173	1.74
Marc King	145	1.46
Jonathan Meriano	127	1.28
Duddee Gawne	123	1.24
Rick Hottot	112	1.13

Ward 8 - South Chatham 2 to be elected
Candidate	Vote	%
Brock McGregor (X)	2,594	21.65
Conor Allin (X)	2,413	20.14
Rick Nicholls	2,059	17.18
Stephani Shill	1,102	9.20
Sandra Dorner	936	7.81
Scott Thompson	902	7.53
Bruce Caldwell	448	3.74
Cynthia Côté	443	3.70
Luke Van Der Vliet	419	3.50
Andy Fisher	242	2.02
Ryan Drouillard	171	1.43
John Duquette	132	1.10
Paolo Graciano	121	1.01

=== Cornwall ===
Registered candidates in Cornwall:

==== Mayor ====
Mayor Justin Towndale ran for re-election. Running against him was city councillor Sarah Good, and musician and special-needs advocate Art Levert. The results were as follows:

Mayoral Candidate	Vote	%
Sarah Good	7,545	53.92
Justin Towndale (X)	4,559	32.58
Art Levert	1,588	11.35
Nicole Spahich	301	2.15

==== Cornwall City Council ====
Cornwall City Council was reduced from 10 to 8 seats for this election.

The results for Cornwall City Council are as follows:

At-large 8 to be elected
Candidate	Vote	%
Todd Lalonde	7,213	9.33
John Cameron	6,142	7.94
Dean Hollingsworth (X)	5,639	7.29
Todd Bennett (X)	5,299	6.85
Jason Riley	4,706	6.09
Denis Sabourin (X)	4,601	5.95
Elaine MacDonald (X)	4,344	5.62
Joël Côté	4,140	5.36
Claude Poirier	3,802	4.92
Vamini Mohanathas	3,620	4.68
Fred Ngoundjo (X)	3,579	4.63
Lisa Olmstead	3,331	4.31
Joanne Parker	2,823	3.65
Jeremy Rose	2,422	3.13
Carol Boileau	2,337	3.02
Jody Mitic	2,167	2.80
Mary Jane Proulx	1,610	2.08
Jason Mousseau	1,554	2.01
Dan Beaudoin	1,473	1.91
Christopher Leclair	1,401	1.81
Tobias LeGros	1,244	1.61
Roger Lamoreaux	1,086	1.40
Chris Crompton	754	0.98
Shozib Haroon	729	0.94
Hamid Dannoun	698	0.90
Tyler Hudon	595	0.77

=== Gananoque ===
Mayor John Beddows ran for re-election. He was challenged by councillor Colin Brown, entrepreneur Clifford Feltham, and former mayor Ted Lojko.

Mayoral Candidate	Vote	%
Colin Brown	1,655	63.39
Clifford Feltham	446	17.08
Ted Lojko	361	13.83
John Beddows (X)	149	5.71

=== Guelph ===
List of candidates in Guelph:

==== Mayor ====
2026 Guelph municipal election
- October 26, 2026
Nominee	Leanne Caron	Ken Yee Chew	John Edward Krusky
Popular vote	23,781	15,046	2,470
Percentage	53.96%	34.14%	5.60%
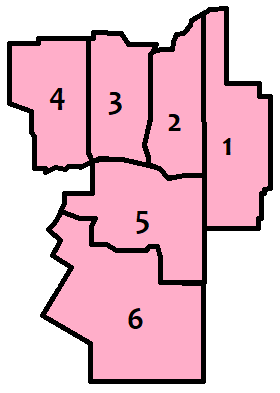
- Map of Guelph's 6 wards
Mayor before election
Cam Guthrie
Elected mayor
Leanne Caron

Mayor Cam Guthrie announced on March 16 that he was not running for re-election. On April 26, city councillor Leanne Caron announced she was running to replace him. A second candidate has also entered, Evaristo Ramos, a US immigrant of Lipan Apache heritage and co-founder of the Guelph Indigenous Community Council. Also running are retired teacher Ryan Meunier, Ward 6 councillor Ken Yee Chew, businessman Rajee Sinha and security consultant John Edward Krusky.

Mayoral Candidate	Vote	%
Leanne Caron	23,781	53.96
Ken Yee Chew	15,046	34.14
John Edward Krusky	2,470	5.60
Ryan Meunier	1,460	3.31
Rajee Sinha	778	1.77
Evaristo Ramos Jr.	533	1.21

==== Guelph City Council ====
Results for Guelph City Council are as follows. Each ward elects two councillors. Voters voted for two candidates in each ward.

Ward 1
Candidate	Vote	%
Dan Gibson (X)	3,403	29.97
Mustafa Zuberi	2,220	19.55
Owen Martens	2,053	18.08
Daniel Kaufmann	1,189	10.47
Marcel Dion Lambert	847	7.46
Dave Williams	747	6.58
Evan Silva	538	4.74
Tammy Corbin	356	3.14

Ward 2
Candidate	Vote	%
Rodrigo Goller (X)	3,928	23.80
Kim Fry	2,593	15.71
Greg Cox	2,371	14.37
Michael Barber	2,301	13.94
Michelle Bowman	1,908	11.56
Barbara Mann	960	5.82
Troy Bridgeman	875	5.30
Morgan Dandie	838	5.08
Alec Purves	727	4.41

Ward 3
Candidate	Vote	%
Phil Allt (X)	4,170	36.02
Marty Williams	2,810	24.27
Kevin Bowman	2,179	18.82
Michele Richardson (X)	1,795	15.51
Annika Maldonado	622	5.37

Ward 4
Candidate	Vote	%
Brendan Clark	3,697	36.33
Linda Busuttil (X)	2,951	29.00
Derek McCaughan	1,757	17.27
Ali Malik	886	8.71
Jesse Guite	884	8.69

Ward 5
Candidate	Vote	%
Danny Lui	2,505	17.60
Cathy Downer (X)	2,389	16.78
Michael Agueci	2,181	15.32
Greg Cawsey	2,104	14.78
Jon Christensen	2,012	14.13
Dakota Cherry	1,367	9.60
Dylan White	539	3.79
James Doran	478	3.36
Xandine Arnott	421	2.96
Wesley Harris	239	1.68

Ward 6
Candidate	Vote	%
Rebecca Adam	3,895	26.00
Luke Devos	3,594	23.99
Katherine Hauser (X)	2,504	16.71
Laura McQuillen	2,408	16.07
Shane Coulis	2,163	14.44
Helen Liu	419	2.80

=== Haldimand County ===
The candidates for mayor of Haldimand County and Haldimand County Municipal Council are as follows:

==== Mayor ====
Mayor Shelley Ann Bentley ran for re-election. Running against her was Jake Vandendool, the founder of Metro Loop, a fibre optic internet provider.

Mayoral Candidate	Vote	%
Jake Vandendool	9,253	54.65
Shelley Ann Bentley (X)	5,209	30.77
Andy Griffin	2,091	12.35
Jesse Little	377	2.23

==== Haldimand County Municipal Council ====
Hadlimand Council gained one ward after a ward boundary review.

Map of Haldimand County's seven new wards

Ward 1
Candidate	Vote	%
Brian Doyle	1,617	59.08
Debra McKeen (X)	1,120	40.92

Ward 2
Candidate	Vote	%
Bruce F. Mehlenbacher	1,232	47.94
John Metcalfe (X)	969	37.70
William Allen	194	7.55
Paul Thomas Beauvais	175	6.81

Ward 3
Candidate	Vote	%
Dan Lawrence (X)	1,774	68.60
Ryan Mastromatteo	812	31.40

Ward 4
Candidate	Vote	%
Jason Harnett	1,277	51.39
Tony Dalimonte	957	38.51
Anna Mroz	251	10.10

Ward 5
Candidate	Vote	%
Cathy Case	1,398	67.67
Ben Tucci	606	29.33
Dave Chevrier	62	3.00

Ward 6
Candidate	Vote	%
Rob Shirton (X)	733	28.17
Geoff Edie	561	21.56
John Ricker	324	12.45
Earl Reinink	296	11.38
Lisa Taylor	280	10.76
Ian Cowan	170	6.53
Veronika Simmons	128	4.92
Patti Turnbull	110	4.23

Ward 7
Candidate	Vote	%
Russ McTear	542	28.47
Rebecca Stewart	418	21.95
Kelly Jones Shaw	336	17.65
Rabiya Azeez	220	11.55
Rob Duncan	215	11.29
Shiwani Sagar	173	9.09

=== Kawartha Lakes ===
The candidates for mayor of Kawartha Lakes and Kawartha Lakes City Council are as follows:

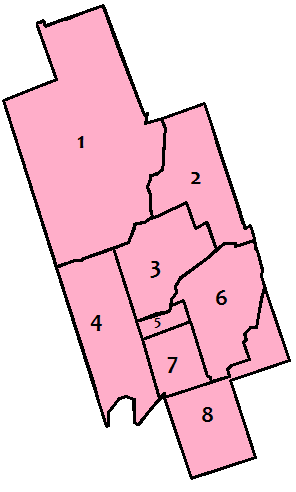
Map of Kawartha Lakes' eight wards

==== Mayor ====
Running for mayor so far is Ward 6 councillor Ron Ashmore, and Ward 7 councillor Charlie McDonald.

Mayoral Candidate	Vote	%
Charles McDonald	13,542	51.54
Ron Ashmore	8,495	32.33
Doug Ford	2,317	8.82
Mathew Flynn	1,606	6.11
David Korn	316	1.20

==== Kawartha Lakes City Council ====
Ward 1
Candidate	Vote	%
Brian Bartley	824	32.57
Jennifer Sherry	613	24.23
Jennifer Shilverthorne-Litton	414	16.36
Vicki Taylor	347	13.72
Don Logan	332	13.12

Ward 2
Candidate	Vote	%
Terry Blackmore	2,141	67.28
Pat Warren (X)	28.57|	
Karina Guadier	132	4.15

Ward 3
Candidate	Vote	%
Mike Perry (X)	2,925	89.59
Jim Greensides	340	10.41

Ward 4
Candidate	Vote	%
Guru Bhat	1,938	58.80
Dan Joyce (X)	777	23.57
Ron Ross	351	10.65
Shannon Reddom	230	6.98

Ward 5
Candidate	Vote	%
Mark Doble (X)	2,663	62.93
Julie Coombs	1,073	25.35
Joey Abbott	407	9.62
Willy Thornbury	89	2.10

Ward 6
Candidate	Vote	%
Jasmine Marshall	2,891	81.85
Mary Ann Martin	502	14.21
Janet Eleanore Barnard	139	3.94

Ward 7
Candidate	Vote	%
Eric Smeaton	2,375	65.92
Brooke Rouse	522	14.49
Shelagh McFarlane	432	11.99
Shahla Ghiasi Tarzi	147	4.08
Liam Bruyn	127	3.52

Ward 8
Candidate	Vote	%
Tom Hickey	1,603	69.21
Steve Lesperance	392	16.93
Wyatt Colazzi	321	13.86

=== Kingston ===
2026 Kingston municipal election
- October 26, 2026
Nominee	Conny Glenn	Bryan Paterson	Vanessa Mensah
Popular vote	16,451	15,658	5,351
Percentage	43.26%	41.17%	14.07%
Mayor before election
Bryan Paterson
Elected mayor
Conny Glenn

List of candidates in Kingston:

==== Mayor ====
Mayor Bryan Paterson announced on June 16 that he was running for re-election. Sydenham District councillor Conny Glenn, and founder and lead therapist at Selah Counselling and Consulting Vanessa Mensah are running against him.

Mayoral Candidate	Vote	%
Conny Glenn	16,451	43.26
Bryan Paterson (X)	15,658	41.17
Vanessa Mensah	5,351	14.07
Grant Bedard	572	1.50

==== Kingston City Council ====
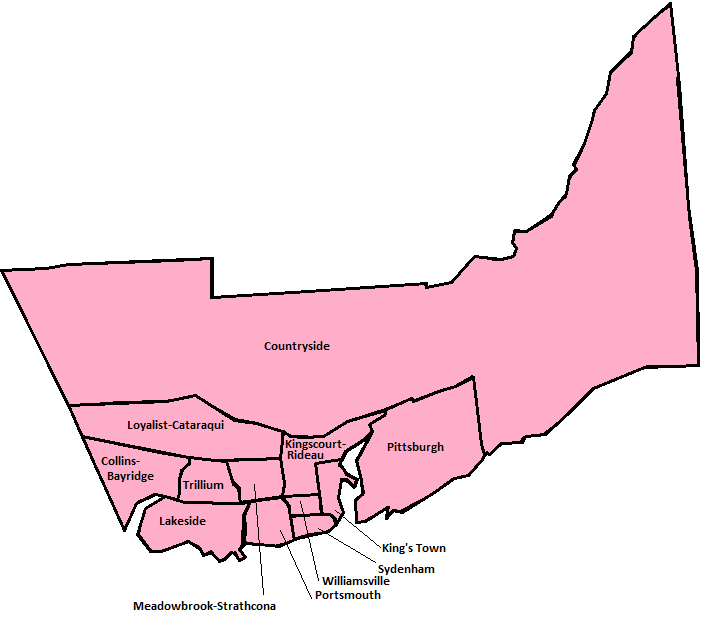
Map of Kingston's districts

The candidates for Kingston City Council are as follows:

District 1 - Countryside
Candidate	Vote	%
Vic Sahai	1,413	48.59
Jeff Scott	784	26.96
Joseph Abreu	711	24.45

District 2 - Loyalist-Cataraqui
Candidate	Vote	%
Paul Chaves (X)	2,011	48.11
Jeff Pearce	1,309	31.32
Dorian Hartley	533	12.75
Charanjeev Sekhon	327	7.82

District 3 - Collins-Bayridge
Candidate	Vote	%
Lisa Osanic (X)	2,143	60.42
Joel Anthony Bruce	1,404	39.58

District 4 - Lakeside
Candidate	Vote	%
Wendy Stephen (X)	3,457	86.49
Stephen Cuthbertson	540	13.51

District 5 - Portsmouth
Candidate	Vote	%
Don Amos (X)	Acclaimed	

District 6 - Trillium
Candidate	Vote	%
Jimmy Hassan (X)	3,350	90.01
Prakash Dayal	372	9.99

District 7 - Kingscourt-Rideau
Candidate	Vote	%
Brandon Tozzo (X)	2,089	73.56
Michael Judd	609	21.44
Kevin Smith	142	5.00

District 8 - Meadowbrook-Strathcona
Candidate	Vote	%
Jeff McLaren (X)	1,663	50.61
Daria Juudi-Hope	1,336	40.66
Roger Dennis	287	8.73

District 9 - Williamsville
Candidate	Vote	%
Vincent Cinanni (X)	Acclaimed	

District 10 - Sydenham
Candidate	Vote	%
Annie Palone	809	45.84
Rajesh Kumar	390	22.10
John Meligrana	376	21.30
Andrew DaCosta	190	10.76

District 11 - King's Town
Candidate	Vote	%
Aba Mortley	1,241	44.23
Greg Ridge (X)	996	35.50
Melissa Reid	569	20.28

District 12 - Pittsburgh
Candidate	Vote	%
Ryan Nelson Boehme (X)	2,574	61.05
Matt McTaggart	1,176	27.89
Chelsea Rae	284	6.74
Zachary Typhair	182	4.32

=== Norfolk County ===
The candidates for mayor of Norfolk County and for Norfolk County Council are as follows:

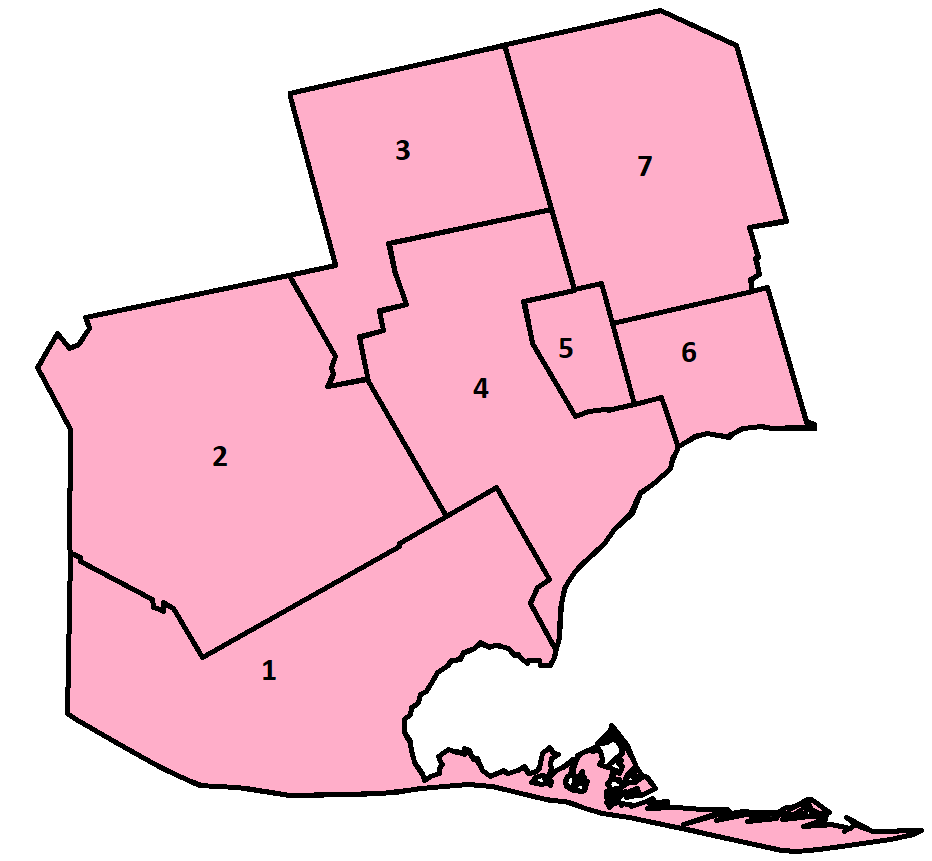
Map of Norfolk County's wards

==== Mayor ====
Mayor Amy Martin is not running for re-election. Running to replace her are Ward 1 councillor Noel Haydt, Ward 5 councillor Doug Brunton, former Haldimand County mayor Ken Hewitt, realtor Rhyus Reeves, former RCMP staff sergeant Keith Milner and Ward 6 councillor Adam Veri.

Mayoral Candidate	Vote	%
Adam Veri	5,884	29.61
Doug Brunton	3,956	19.91
Ken Hewitt	3,269	16.45
Keith Milner	3,264	16.43
Noel Haydt	2,828	14.23
David Finch	525	2.64
Rhyus Reeves	143	0.72

==== Norfolk County Council ====
Ward 1
Candidate	Vote	%
Tom Masschaele (X)	1,083	52.73
Greg D'Hulster	971	47.27

Ward 2
Candidate	Vote	%
Linda Vandendriessche (X)	980	62.03
Debbie Wilbur	600	37.97

Ward 3
Candidate	Vote	%
Hetty Verlinden	1,213	55.57
Doug Moyaert	515	23.59
Chris Gill	455	20.84

Ward 4
Candidate	Vote	%
Chris Van Paassen* (Note: After Van Passen and Lambert finished with the same number of votes following a recount, Van Passen's name was drawn out of a 143-year old top hat by the county clerk, and was thus elected) (X)	858	40.36
Jeni Lambert*	858	40.36
Drew Hemsley	410	19.29

Ward 5 2 to be elected
Candidate	Vote	%
Alan Duthie (X)	2,210	24.96
Ryan Boyko	1,900	21.46
Mike Storoschuk	1,569	17.72
Dennis Travale	845	9.54
Peter Black	612	6.91
Bob Townsend	589	6.65
Quentin Dixon	391	4.42
Krissi Wiseman	322	3.64
Kevin Allen	266	3.00
Princess Peace	151	1.71

Ward 6
Candidate	Vote	%
Zvonko Horvat	1,810	41.64
Bill Jukes	1,218	28.02
Pam Taylor	1,138	26.18
Ray Hunter	181	4.16

Ward 7
Candidate	Vote	%
Kim Huffman (X)	1,694	68.69
Warren Cummings	772	31.31

=== Orillia ===
==== Mayor ====
Mayor Don McIsaac did not run for re-election. Running to replace him were Ward 1 councillor Whitney Joy Smith and former mayor Steve Clarke.

The candidates for mayor of Orillia are as follows:

Mayoral Candidate	Vote	%
Steve Clarke	7,569	81.75
Whitney Joy Smith	1,690	18.25

=== Pelee ===
The results in Pelee were as follows:

==== Mayor ====
Mayoral Candidate	Vote	%
David DeLellis	213	70.53
Jaak Purres	89	29.47

=== Pembroke ===
==== Mayor ====
Pembroke mayor Ron Gervais ran for re-election. Deputy mayor Brian Abdallah ran against him.

Mayoral Candidate	Vote	%
Stephanie LeMay	1,545	32.26
Brian Abdallah	15,18	31.70
Ron Gervais (X)	1,278	26.69
Griffith James Slaughter	261	5.45
Bill Michaelis	164	3.42
Stanley Everett Sambey	23	0.48

=== Peterborough ===
The candidates for mayor of Peterborough and Peterborough City Council are as follows:

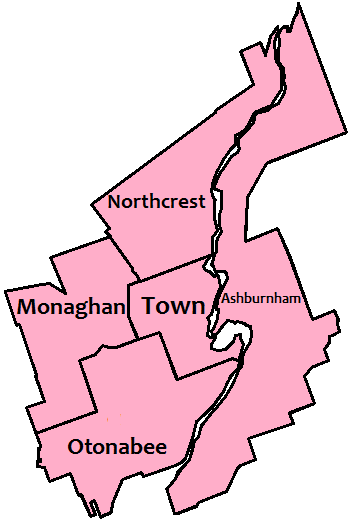
Map of Peterborough's five wards

==== Mayor ====
Mayor Jeff Leal is not running for re-election. Running for mayor are Catharine Parr Traill College principal Michael Eamon, entrepreneur Neil Morton, Ashburnham Ward councillor Keith Riel, former executive officer of the Peterborough and the Kawarthas Home Builders' Association, Rebecca Schillemat, Trent Radio director of operations Rob Hailman, and real estate broker Brian Lumsden.

Mayoral Candidate	Vote	%
Michael Eamon	10,867	36.50
Neil Morton	7,372	24.76
Keith Riel	5,990	20.12
Rebecca Schillemat	2,526	8.48
Jacob Méthot	1,112	3.73
Brian Lumsden	1,106	3.71
Rob Hailman	800	2.69

==== Peterborough City Council ====
Two councillors are elected from each of the 5 wards.

Ward 1 - Otonabee
Candidate	Vote	%
Lesley Parnell (X)	2,677	29.32
Chris Potter	2,318	25.39
Kevin Duguay (X)	2,294	25.13
Lucas Graham	1,580	17.31
Joe Laton-Trickett	260	2.85

Ward 2 - Monaghan
Candidate	Vote	%
Matt Crowley (X)	5,301	43.91
AJ Shearer	2,241	18.56
Ashley Flynn	1,935	16.03
Rose Kitney	1,197	9.92
Jen Lacey	1,061	8.79
Aris Metaxakis	337	2.79

Ward 3 - Town
Candidate	Vote	%
Alex Bierk (X)	3,261	33.38
Joy Lachica (X)	3,086	31.59
Jenni Cathcart	2,296	23.51
Nigel Lister	657	6.37
Jessica Kuhlmorgen-Hille	468	4.79

Ward 4 - Ashburnham
Candidate	Vote	%
Ashley Bonner	3,536	33.99
Jason Stabler	3,107	29.86
Gary Baldwin (X)	2,570	24.70
Andrew MacGregor	1,191	11.45

Ward 5 - Northcrest
Candidate	Vote	%
Andrew Beamer (X)	3,765	32.01
Charmaine Magumbe	2,371	20.16
Jim Wasson	1,536	13.06
Gavin Muir	1,528	12.99
Debbie Halstead	1,026	8.72
Phil Jolicoeur	843	7.17
Paul Lawton	640	5.44
Dennis Nephin	52	0.44

=== Prescott ===
Mayor Gauri Shankar was challenged by owner of MacKay funeral home, Tim MacKay.

Mayoral Candidate	Vote	%
Gauri Shankar (X)	865	55.31
Timothy MacKay	699	44.69

=== Prince Edward County ===
==== Mayor ====
Mayor Steve Ferguson did not run for re-election. Running to replace him were architect Ernie Margetson, Ward 2 councillor Brad Nieman and former councillor Terry Shortt.

The candidates for mayor of Prince Edward County are as follows:

Mayoral Candidate	Vote	%
Ernie Margetson	8,261	62.16
Brad Nieman	3,598	27.08
Terry Shortt	1,430	10.76

=== Quinte West ===
List of candidates for mayor of Quinte West and Quinte West City Council:

==== Mayor ====
Running for mayor were city councillors Zack Card, and Shelley Stedall.

Mayoral Candidate	Vote	%
Zack Card	7,424	56.34
Shelley Stedall	5,180	39.31
David Thomson	574	4.36

==== Quinte West City Council ====
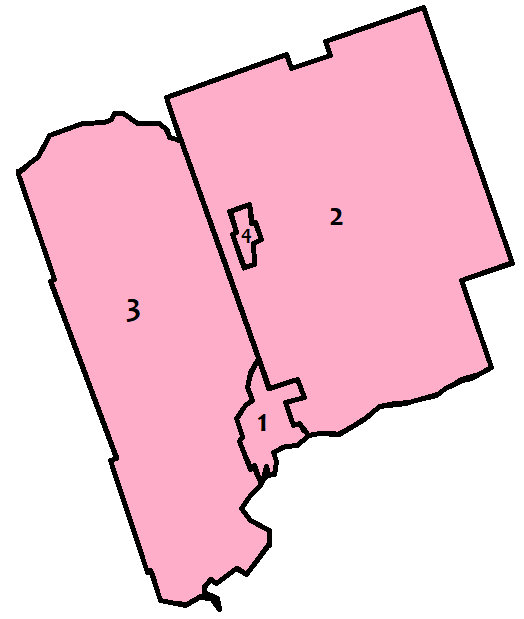
Map of Quinte West's four wards

Ward 1 - Trenton 5 to be elected
Candidate	Vote	%
Leslie Roseblade (X)	2,308	16.43
Mike Cowan	2,092	14.89
Trevor McMillan	1,846	13.14
Spencer Hutchison	1,730	12.31
Tyler Rickey	1,598	11.37
Paul Bartz	1,253	8.92
Robert Wharram	1,210	8.61
Brent Parsons	955	6.80
Matthew Brumsey	619	4.41
Gilles Bourke	438	3.12

Ward 2 - Sidney 4 to be elected
Candidate	Vote	%
Egerton Boyce (X)	2,145	17.86
Allan DeWitt	2,002	16.67
Don Kuntze (X)	1,803	15.01
Kate Widdifield	1,640	13.65
Brian J. Arthur	1,447	12.05
Kandis Hambly	1,106	9.21
Keith Poulin	1,066	8.87
John Desloges	516	4.30
David Jesse	288	2.40

Ward 3 - Murray 2 to be elected
Candidate	Vote	%
Tim Durkin	2,091	29.02
Brian Crews	1,951	27.08
Ed Santos	1,184	16.43
Doug Herrington	883	12.26
Jordan Hoyland	663	9.20
David Lovely	433	6.01

Ward 4 - Frankford
Candidate	Vote	%
Matt Joice	522	55.89
JD Brown	412	44.11

=== Smiths Falls ===
Mayor Shawn Pankow did not run for re-election.

Mayoral Candidate	Vote	%
Christopher G. Cummings	1,781	52.91
Peter McKenna	986	29.29
Nate Morris	599	17.80

=== St. Marys ===
Former councillor Don Van Galen ran against deputy mayor Brogan Aylward.

==== Mayor ====
Mayoral Candidate	Vote	%
Brogan Aylward	2,491	88.84
Don Van Galen	313	11.16

=== Stratford ===
==== Mayor ====
Mayor Martin Ritsma ran for re-election. Running against him were city councillors Jo-Dee Burbach, and Mark Hunter, architect Robert Ritz, and technical support worker Andrew Rea.

The results for mayor of Stratford were as follows:

Mayoral Candidate	Vote	%
Robert Ritz	4,246	31.15
Jo-Dee Burbach	3,738	27.42
Martin Ritsma (X)	2,899	21.27
Mark Hunter	2,542	18.65
Andrew Rea	206	1.51

=== St. Thomas ===
List of candidates in St. Thomas:

==== Mayor ====
Mayor Joe Preston announced he would not be seeking re-election. Running to replace him is truck driver Corey Janzen, and city councillor and former mayor Jeff Kohler.

Mayoral Candidate	Vote	%
Jeff Kohler	7,407	68.63
Aidan Frederick	2,641	24.47
Corey Janzen	745	6.90

==== St. Thomas City Council ====
Candidates for St. Thomas City Council.

At-large 8 to be elected
Candidate	Vote	%
Steve Wookey	6,292	9.79
Lori Baldwin-Sands (X)	6,075	9.46
Mike Brisson	5,834	9.08
Gary Clarke (X)	5,734	8.93
Heather Jackson	5,208	8.11
Kyle Yates	5,103	7.94
Rose Gibson (X)	4,544	7.07
Joe Docherty Jr.	4,050	6.30
Jim Herbert (X)	3,959	6.16
Earl Taylor (X)	3,946	6.14
Joan Rymal (X)	3,023	4.71
Kay Vaughan	2,067	3.22
Malichi Male	2,040	3.18
Geoff Mountenay	1,447	2.25
Sandra Hamill	1,172	1.82
Steve Ogden	1,138	1.77
Chris Deslandes	1,080	1.68
Christopher Staddon	1,021	1.59
Gibbs Diobe	508	0.79

== Counties ==
Counties in Ontario are upper-tier municipalities, mostly located in rural parts of Southern Ontario. They are made up of a number of lower-tier municipalities.

=== Bruce ===
==== Bruce County Council ====
Bruce County Council consists of the mayors of the constituent municipalities.

Municipality	Mayor
Arran-Elderslie	Steve Hammell (acclaimed)
Brockton	Chris Peabody (acclaimed)
Huron-Kinloss	Don Murray
Kincardine	Barb Fisher
Northern Bruce Peninsula	Milt McIver
Saugeen Shores	Luke Charbonneau
South Bruce	Mark Goetz
South Bruce Peninsula	Jay Kirkland

==== Arran-Elderslie ====
List of candidates:

Mayor Steve Hammell was re-elected by acclamation after John Alpaugh dropped out.

Mayoral Candidate	Vote	%
Steve Hammell (X)	Acclaimed	

==== Brockton ====
Chris Peabody was re-elected as mayor of Brockton by acclamation.

Mayoral Candidate	Vote	%
Chris Peabody (X)	Acclaimed	

==== Huron-Kinloss ====
Mayor Shawn Plante was challenged by businessman Shawn Plante.

List of candidates:

Mayoral Candidate	Vote	%
Don Murray (X)	2,175	70.53
Shawn Plante	909	29.47

==== Kincardine ====
Mayor Kenneth Craig was challenged by Ward 2 councillor Bill Stewart, and former MPP Barb Fisher.

List of candidates:

Mayoral Candidate	Vote	%
Barb Fisher	2,283	42.66
Kenneth Craig (X)	2,001	37.39
Bill Stewart	1,068	19.96

==== Northern Bruce Peninsula ====
Mayor Milt McIver, the second-longest serving head of council in the country (after Gord Krantz in Milton) ran for re-election. He hasd served as mayor since the municipality's founding in 1999, and previously as the reeve of Lindsay Township from 1982.

List of candidates:

Mayoral Candidate	Vote	%
Milt McIver (X)	1,935	59.83
Brad Gesinghaus	1,299	40.17

==== Saugeen Shores ====
Mayor Luke Charbonneau announced on May 19 that he was running for re-election.

List of candidates:

Mayoral Candidate	Vote	%
Luke Charbonneau (X)	3,983	50.48
Brian Putman	2,753	34.89
Jeff James	1,155	14.64

==== South Bruce ====
Mayor Mark Goetz was challenged by at-large councillor Mike Niesen.

List of candidates:

Mayoral Candidate	Vote	%
Mark Goetz (X)	1,219	51.33
Mike Niesen	1,156	48.67

==== South Bruce Peninsula ====
Mayor Jay Kirkland ran for re-election. Running against him were the owner of Klingenberg Design, Bill Klingenberg, and former mayors John Close and Janice Jackson.

List of candidates:

Mayoral Candidate	Vote	%
Jay Kirkland (X)	1,769	32.92
Bill Klingenberg	1,549	28.82
Janice Jackson	1,047	19.48
John David Close	1,009	18.78

=== Dufferin ===
==== Dufferin County Council ====
Dufferin County Council has 15 members, two from each constituent municipality except for East Garafraxa which elects just one member.

Position	Elected
Amaranth Mayor	Chris Gerrits (acclaimed)
Amaranth Deputy Mayor	Gail Little (acclaimed)
East Garafraxa Mayor	Guy Gardhouse (acclaimed)
Grand Valley Mayor	Steve Soloman
Grand Valley Deputy Mayor	Jennifer Tovell
Melancthon Mayor	Darren White
Melancthon Deputy Mayor	James McLean (acclaimed)
Mono Mayor	John Creelman
Mono Deputy Mayor	Laura Campbell
Mulmur Mayor	Janet Horner (acclaimed)
Mulmur Deputy Mayor	Andrew Cunningham
Orangeville Mayor	Lisa Post
Orangeville Deputy Mayor	Todd Taylor
Shelburne Mayor	Wade Mills
Shelburne Deputy Mayor	Len Guchardi

==== Amaranth ====
List of candidates:

===== Mayor =====
Mayoral Candidate	Vote	%
Chris Gerrits (X)	Acclaimed	

===== Deputy mayor =====
Deputy mayoral Candidate	Vote	%
Gail Little (X)	Acclaimed	

==== East Garafraxa ====
List of candidates:

===== Mayor =====
Mayoral Candidate	Vote	%
Guy Gardhouse (X)	Acclaimed	

==== Grand Valley ====
List of candidates:

===== Mayor =====
Mayoral Candidate	Vote	%
Steve Soloman (X)	769	55.24
Paul Latam	623	44.76

===== Deputy mayor =====
Deputy mayoral Candidate	Vote	%
Jennifer Tovell	565	41.03
Phillip Rentsch (X)	448	32.53
Martin Kouyoumdjian	364	26.43

==== Melancthon ====
List of candidates:

===== Mayor =====
Mayoral Candidate	Vote	%
Darren White (X)	660	66.13
Ruth Plowright	338	33.87

===== Deputy mayor =====
Deputy mayoral Candidate	Vote	%
James McLean (X)	Acclaimed	

==== Mono ====
List of candidates:

===== Mayor =====
Mayoral Candidate	Vote	%
John Creelman (X)	1,734	57.06
Melinda Davie	740	24.35
Emerson Pendleton	565	18.59

===== Deputy mayor =====
Deputy mayoral Candidate	Vote	%
Laura Campbell	1,738	58.76
Fred Nix (X)	1,220	41.24

==== Mulmur ====
===== Mayor =====
Mayoral Candidate	Vote	%
Janet Horner (X)	Acclaimed	

===== Deputy mayor =====
Deputy mayoral Candidate	Vote	%
Andrew Cunningham	582	53.25
Patricia Clark	511	46.75

==== Orangeville ====
List of candidates:

===== Mayor =====
Mayoral Candidate	Vote	%
Lisa Post (X)	4,804	52.35
Jeremy Williams	1,868	20.36
Sandy Brown	1,408	15.34
Christopher DeCastro	561	6.11
Nick Garisto	535	5.83

===== Deputy mayor =====
Deputy mayoral candidate	Vote	%
Todd Taylor (X)	6,496	73.83
Sheila Hall	2,302	26.17

==== Shelburne ====
List of candidates:

===== Mayor =====
Mayoral Candidate	Vote	%
Wade Mills (X)	2,101	85.62
PK Uthayakumar	353	14.38

===== Deputy mayor =====
Deputy mayoral candidate	Vote	%
Len Guchardi	1,477	60.38
Andrea Knight	686	28.05
Mike Green	283	11.57

=== Elgin ===
==== Elgin County Council ====
Elgin County Council consists of the mayors of the constituent municipalities plus the deputy mayors of Central Elgin and Malahide.

Position	Elected
Aylmer Mayor	Kathryn Desrosiers
Bayham Mayor	Ed Ketchabaw
Central Elgin Mayor	Dennis Crevits
Central Elgin Deputy Mayor	Meagan Ruddock (acclaimed)
Dutton/Dunwich Mayor	Henry Dryfhout
Malahide Mayor	Dominique Giguere (acclaimed)
Malahide Deputy Mayor	Scott Lewis
Southwold Mayor	Grant Jones (acclaimed)
West Elgin Mayor	Felipe Philip Sousa

==== Aylmer ====
===== Mayor =====
Running for mayor were retired corporate executive Brad Andrews, deputy mayor Pete Barbour and councillor Kathryn Desrosiers.

Mayoral Candidate	Vote	%
Kathryn Desrosiers	1,483	48.90
Brad Andrews	1,161	38.28
Pete Barbour	389	12.83

==== Bayham ====
===== Mayor =====
Incumbent Ed Ketchabaw was challenged by volunteer Ken Kokko and businessmen Hank Peters and Barry Wade.

Mayoral Candidate	Vote	%
Ed Ketchabaw (X)	718	40.41
Barry Wade	406	22.85
Hank Peters	338	19.02
Ken Kokko	315	17.73

==== Central Elgin ====
===== Mayor =====
Mayor Andrew Sloan did not run for re-election. Running to replace him were councillor Morgaine Griffin and former deputy mayor and councillor Dennis Crevits.

Mayoral Candidate	Vote	%
Dennis Crevits	2,552	54.33
Morgaine Griffin	2,145	45.67

===== Deputy mayor =====
Deputy Mayoral Candidate	Vote	%
Meagan Ruddock	Acclaimed	

==== Dutton/Dunwich ====
===== Mayor =====
Mayoral Candidate	Vote	%
Henry Dryfhout	1,409	77.59
Bob Purcell	407	22.41

==== Malahide ====
===== Mayor =====
Mayoral Candidate	Vote	%
Dominique Giguère (X)	Acclaimed	

===== Deputy mayor =====
Deputy Mayoral Candidate	Vote	%
Scott Lewis	1,350	59.21
Mark Widner (X)	930	40.79

==== Southwold ====
===== Mayor =====
Mayoral Candidate	Vote	%
Grant Jones (X)	Acclaimed	

==== West Elgin ====
===== Mayor =====
Mayoral Candidate	Vote	%
Felipe Philip Sousa	910	41.55
Mike Robinson	727	33.20
Bernhard Wiehle	553	25.25

=== Frontenac ===
==== Frontenac County Council ====
Frontenac County Council consists of the mayors of each of the four constituent municipalities plus an additional councillor from each municipality.

Position	Elected
Central Frontenac Mayor	Nicki Gowdy
Central Frontenac Councillor	Selected from council
Frontenac Islands Mayor	Dan Hulton
Frontenac Islands Councillor	Selected from council
North Frontenac Mayor	Gerry Lichty
North Frontenac Councillor	Selected from council
South Frontenac Mayor	Ron Vandewal
South Frontenac Councillor	Selected from council

==== Central Frontenac ====
===== Mayor =====
List of candidates:

Mayoral Candidate	Vote	%
Nicki Gowdy	1,669	60.27
Susan Irwin	1,100	39.73

==== Frontenac Islands ====
===== Mayor =====
List of candidates:

Mayoral Candidate	Vote	%
Dan Hulton	1,075	70.49
Judith Anne Greenwood-Speers (X)	450	29.51

==== North Frontenac ====
===== Mayor =====
List of candidates:

Mayoral Candidate	Vote	%
Gerry Lichty (X)	1,140	60.03
Arthur Hannigan	596	31.38
Kelly Willis	163	8.58

==== South Frontenac ====
===== Mayor =====
List of candidates:

Mayoral Candidate	Vote	%
Ron Vandewal (X)	3,879	52.13
Steven Leonard	2,411	32.40
Alan Revill	1,151	15.47

=== Haliburton ===
==== Haliburton County Council ====
Haliburton County Council consists of the mayors and deputy mayors of the four constituent municipalities. A warden is elected from the eight members.

Position	Elected
Algonquin Highlands Mayor	Liz Danielsen
Algonquin Highlands Deputy Mayor	(chosen from council)
Dysart et al Mayor	Greg Bishop
Dysart et al Deputy Mayor	Walt McKechnie
Highlands East Mayor	Dave Burton
Highlands East Deputy Mayor	(chosen from council)
Minden Hills Mayor	Tammy McKelvey
Minden Hills Deputy Mayor	Ivan Ingram

==== Algonquin Highlands ====
===== Mayor =====
Mayoral Candidate	Vote	%
Liz Danielsen (X)	1,260	55.05
Mike Lang	1,029	44.95

==== Dysart et al ====
Mayor Murray Fearrey died on May 28, 2026 and was replaced by deputy mayor Walt McKechnie on July 7, who decided to run for deputy mayor again. Running for mayor were land surveyor Greg Bishop and businessman Andrew Nowell.

===== Mayor =====
Mayoral Candidate	Vote	%
Greg Bishop	4,506	87.41
Andrew Nowell	649	12.59

===== Deputy mayor =====
Deputy mayoral candidate	Vote	%
Walt McKechnie	2,828	54.72
Pat Casey (X)	2,340	45.28

==== Highlands East ====
===== Mayor =====
Mayor Dave Burton ran for re-election. Running against him were county roads worker Cheryl Ellis, former Toronto Transit Commission head of transit enforcement and chief constable, and deputy city clerk for Markham Mike Killingsworth, paralegal Krystle Anne Pegg, and former councillor Steven Kauffeldt.

Mayoral Candidate	Vote	%
Dave Burton (X)	842	29.42
Steve Kauffeldt	786	27.29
Krystle Anne Pegg	577	20.03
Mike Killingsworth	467	16.22
Cheryl Ellis	208	7.22

==== Minden Hills ====
===== Mayor =====
Mayoral Candidate	Vote	%
Tammy McKelvey	1,698	39.67
Pam Sayne	1,181	27.59
Bob Carter (X)	809	18.90
Pat Kitcheman	592	13.83

===== Deputy mayor =====
Deputy mayoral candidate	Vote	%
Ivan Ingram	2,359	58.00
Richard Bradley	1,708	42.00

=== Hastings ===
==== Hastings County Council ====
Hastings County Council consists of the mayors and reeves of the 14 constituent municipalities.

Elected	Position
Bancroft Mayor	Tracy McGibbon
Carlow/Mayo Mayor	Randy Caldwell
Centre Hastings Mayor	Tom Deline
Deseronto Mayor	Dan Johnston
Faraday Mayor	John O'Donnell (acclaimed)
Hastings Highlands Mayor	Tony Fitzgerald
Limerick Mayor	Kimberly Carson
Madoc Mayor	Doug Reid
Marmora and Lake Mayor	Ron Derry
Stirling-Rawdon Mayor	Tim Osborne
Tudor and Cashel Mayor	Dave Hederson (acclaimed)
Tweed Mayor	Jamie DeMarsh
Tyendinaga Reeve	Adam Hannafin
Wollaston Mayor	Michael Fuerth

==== Bancroft ====
Candidates for mayor of Bancroft included councillor Tracy McGibbon, bylaw enforcement worker Mark Pharand, realtor Brad Sinclair, and Joshua MacDonald.

Mayoral Candidate	Vote	%
Tracy McGibbon	862	41.70
Mark Pharand	802	38.80
Brad Sinclair	361	17.46
Joshua MacDonald	42	2.03

==== Carlow/Mayo ====
Mayoral Candidate	Vote	%
Randy Caldwell	375	67.69
Brent Moxam	179	32.31

==== Centre Hastings ====
Mayoral Candidate	Vote	%
Tom Deline (X)	978	55.32
Jim Chamberlain	790	44.68

==== Deseronto ====
Mayoral Candidate	Vote	%
Dan Johnston (X)	484	79.74
Brad Brown	84	13.84
Greg Soucie	39	6.43

==== Faraday ====
Mayoral Candidate	Vote	%
John O'Donnell	Acclaimed	

==== Hastings Highlands ====
Mayor Tony Fitzgerald was challenged by retired businessman Joey Shulman.

Mayoral Candidate	Vote	%
Tony Fitzgerald (X)	1,777	70.57
Joey Shulman	741	29.43

==== Limerick ====
Mayoral Candidate	Vote	%
Kimberly Carson (X)	449	77.55
Carl Stefanski	130	22.45

==== Madoc ====
Mayoral Candidate	Vote	%
Doug Reid	602	63.17
Loyde Blackburn (X)	351	36.83

==== Marmora and Lake ====
Mayoral Candidate	Vote	%
Ron Derry	718	34.14
Jan O'Neill (X)	459	21.83
Bonnie Danes	328	15.60
Merv Taylor	298	14.17
Trevor Armstrong	254	12.08
Aaron Deonarain	46	2.19

==== Stirling-Rawdon ====
Mayor Bob Mullins did not runfor re-election. Running to replace him was councillor Jeremy Solmes.

Mayoral Candidate	Vote	%
Tim Osborne	1,006	47.88
Jeremy Solmes	556	26.46
John Rock	431	20.51
T.J. O'Heir	108	5.14

==== Tudor and Cashel ====
Reeve Candidate	Vote	%
David Hederson (X)	Acclaimed	

==== Tweed ====
Mayor Don DeGenova did not run for re-election. Running to replace him were Deputy Mayor Jamie DeMarsh and councillor Peter Valiquette.

Mayoral Candidate	Vote	%
Jamie DeMarsh	1,068	38.68
Peter Valiquette	992	35.93
Calvin McDonald	701	25.39

==== Tyendinaga ====
Reeve Candidate	Vote	%
Adam Hannafin	1,090	58.20
Jen Phillips	443	23.65
Claire Kennelly (X)	230	12.28
John Wolf	110	5.87

==== Wollaston ====
Mayoral Candidate	Vote	%
Michael Fuerth (X)	419	51.29
Darlene Colton	398	48.71

=== Huron ===
==== Huron County Council ====
Huron County Council consists of the Mayors and Reeves of each constituent municipality, plus deputy mayors, deputy reeves for all municipalities except Howick, Morris-Turnberry and North Huron

Position	Elected
Ashfield-Colborne-Wawanosh Mayor	Evan Hickey
Ashfield-Colborne-Wawanosh Deputy Mayor	Bill Vanstone
Bluewater Mayor	Paul Klopp
Bluewater Deputy Mayor	Bill Whetstone (acclaimed)
Central Huron Mayor	Marg Anderson (acclaimed)
Central Huron Deputy Mayor	David Jewitt (acclaimed)
Goderich Mayor	Trevor Bazinet
Goderich Deputy Mayor	Randy Carroll (acclaimed)
Howick Reeve	Doug Hargrave (acclaimed)
Huron East Mayor	Alvin McLellan
Huron East Deputy Mayor	(selected from council)
Morris-Turnberry Mayor	Jamie Heffer (acclaimed)
North Huron Reeve	Mitch Wright
South Huron Mayor	Ted Oke
South Huron Deputy Mayor	Jim Dietrich (acclaimed)

==== Ashfield-Colborne-Wawanosh ====
===== Mayor =====
Mayoral Candidate	Vote	%
Evan Hickey	2,322	80.63
Ben Van Egmond	558	19.38

===== Deputy mayor =====
Deputy Mayoral Candidate	Vote	%
Bill Vanstone (X)	1,724	58.52
Lauren Rooyakkers	1,222	41.48

==== Bluewater ====
===== Mayor =====
Mayor Paul Klopp is running for re-election.

Mayoral Candidate	Vote	%
Paul Klopp (X)	2,415	69.24
Tyler Hessel	1,073	30.76

===== Deputy mayor =====
Deputy Mayoral Candidate	Vote	%
Bill Whetstone	Acclaimed	

==== Central Huron ====
===== Mayor =====
Deputy mayor Marg Anderson was elected mayor by acclamation.

Mayoral Candidate	Vote	%
Marg Anderson	Acclaimed	

===== Deputy mayor =====
Deputy Mayoral Candidate	Vote	%
David Jewitt	Acclaimed	

==== Goderich ====
===== Mayor =====
Mayor Trevor Bazinet ran for re-election.

Mayoral Candidate	Vote	%
Trevor Bazinet (X)	3,098	84.07
Steve Buchanan	587	15.93

===== Deputy mayor =====
Deputy Mayoral Candidate	Vote	%
Randy Carroll	Acclaimed	

==== Howick ====
===== Reeve =====
Councillor Doug Hargrave was elected as mayor by acclamation.

Reeve Candidate	Vote	%
Doug Hargrave	Acclaimed	

==== Huron East ====
===== Mayor =====
Deputy mayor Alvin McLellan ran for the municipality's top job.

Mayoral Candidate	Vote	%
Alvin McLellan	1,883	67.25
Conlan Melady	526	18.79
Jonathan Hugill	391	13.96

==== Morris-Turnberry ====
===== Mayor =====
Mayor Jamie Heffer has been re-elected by acclamation.

Mayoral Candidate	Vote	%
Jamie Heffer (X)	Acclaimed	

==== North Huron ====
===== Reeve =====
Reeve Candidate	Vote	%
Mitch Wright	863	47.13
Trevor Seip	842	45.99
Stephen Buck Hill	72	3.93
William G. Darling	54	2.95

==== South Huron ====
===== Mayor =====
Mayor George Finch ran for re-election. He was challenged by former mayor Maureen Cole and Ward 3 councillor Ted Oke.

Mayoral Candidate	Vote	%
Ted Oke	'2,033	47.96
George Finch (X)	1,516	35.76
Maureen Cole	690	16.28

===== Deputy mayor =====
Deputy Mayoral Candidate	Vote	%
Jim Dietrich (X)	Acclaimed	

=== Lanark ===
==== Lanark County Council ====
Lanark County Council consists of two members from each constituent municipality.

Position	Elected
Beckwith Reeve	Richard Kidd
Beckwith Deputy Reeve	Brian Dowdall (acclaimed)
Carleton Place Mayor	Toby Randell (acclaimed)
Carleton Place Deputy Mayor	Andrew Tennant (acclaimed)
Drummond/North Elmsley Reeve	Scott Cameron
Drummond/North Elmsley Deputy Reeve	(selected from council)
Lanark Highlands Reeve	Wes Pugh
Lanark Higlands Deputy Reeve	Frank Sodonis
Mississippi Mills Mayor	Christa Lowry (acclaimed)
Mississippi Mills Deputy Mayor	Rickey Minnille (acclaimed)
Montague Reeve	Karen Francis Jennings (acclaimed)
Montague Deputy Reeve	Jeffrey Carroll
Perth Mayor	Ed McPherson
Perth Deputy Mayor	Catherine Schoular
Tay Valley Reeve	RoxAnne Darling
Tay Valley Deputy Reeve	Frank Johnson

==== Beckwith ====
===== Reeve =====
Reeve Candidate	Vote	%
Richard Kidd (X)	2,376	74.27
Tara Zwicker	823	25.73

===== Deputy reeve =====
Deputy Reeve Candidate	Vote	%
Brian Dowdall (X)	Acclaimed	

==== Carleton Place ====
===== Mayor =====
Mayor Toby Randell has been re-elected by acclamation.

Mayoral Candidate	Vote	%
Toby Randell (X)	Acclaimed	

===== Deputy mayor =====
Deputy Mayor Candidate	Vote	%
Andrew Roy Tennant (X)	Acclaimed	

==== Drummond/North Elmsley ====
===== Reeve =====
Reeve Candidate	Vote	%
Scott Cameron	1,510	56.90
Paul Keho	1,144	43.10

==== Lanark Highlands ====
===== Reeve =====
Reeve Peter McLaren ran for re-election in Lanark Highlands.

Reeve Candidate	Vote	%
Wes Pugh	1,502	55.08
Peter McLaren (X)	621	22.77
Allison Vereyken	475	17.42
Brian Stewart	129	4.73

===== Deputy reeve =====
Deputy Reeve Candidate	Vote	%
Frank Sodonis	1,045	39.09
Bill King (X)	838	31.35
Marina Summers	790	29.55

==== Mississippi Mills ====
Christa Lowry was re-elected as mayor of Mississippi Mills by acclamation.

===== Mayor =====
Mayoral Candidate	Vote	%
Christa Lowry (X)	Acclaimed	

===== Deputy mayor =====
Deputy Mayor Candidate	Vote	%
Rickey Minnille (X)	Acclaimed	

==== Montague ====
===== Reeve =====
Reeve Karen (Francis) Jennings has been re-elected by acclamation.

Reeve Candidate	Vote	%
Karen Francis Jennings (X)	Acclaimed	

===== Deputy reeve =====
Deputy Reeve Candidate	Vote	%
Jeffrey Carroll (X)	885	69.41
Pad Dolan	390	30.59

==== Perth ====
===== Mayor =====
Mayor Judy Brown did not run for re-election. Running to replace her were Deputy Mayor Ed McPherson, councillors Isabel Anne McRae, and David Bird, and businesswoman Stephanie Drummond.

Mayoral Candidate	Vote	%
Ed McPherson	1,011	32.48
Stephanie Drummond	797	25.60
David Bird	698	22.42
Isabel Anne McRae	607	19.50

===== Deputy mayor =====
Deputy Mayor Candidate	Vote	%
Catherine Schoular	1,445	47.49
Richard Schooley	1,174	38,58
Jamie Dyer	424	13.93

==== Tay Valley ====
===== Reeve =====
Reeve Candidate	Vote	%
RoxAnne Darling	1,639	56.97
Marilyn Thomas	1,238	43.03

===== Deputy reeve =====
Deputy Reeve Candidate	Vote	%
Frank Johnson	1,244	43.31
Greg Hallam	986	34.33
Wayne Baker	642	22.35

=== Leeds and Grenville ===
==== Leeds and Grenville United Counties Council ====
The Leeds and Grenville United Counties Council consists of the mayors of the constituent municipalities.

Position	Elected
Athens Mayor	Anne Marie Dancy
Augusta Mayor	Jeffrey Francis Shaver (acclaimed)
Edwardsburgh/Cardinal Mayor	Tory Deschamps (acclaimed)
Elizabethtown-Kitley Mayor	Henry Oosterhof
Front of Yonge Mayor	Kirby Perkins
Leeds and the Thousand Islands Mayor	Corinna Smith-Gatcke
Merrickville-Wolford Mayor	Anne Barr
North Grenville Mayor	Nancy Peckford (acclaimed)
Rideau Lakes Mayor	John Fenik
Westport Mayor	Joe Aragona (acclaimed)

==== Athens ====
Mayor Herb Scott did not run for re-election. Running to replace him were councillor Anne Marie Dancy, and former advisor to prime ministers Jean Chrétien and Paul Martin, Ray Heffernan.

List of candidates:

Mayoral Candidate	Vote	%
Anne Marie Dancy	698	70.22
Ray Heffernan	296	29.78

==== Augusta ====
Mayor Jeff Shaver has been re-elected by acclamation.

List of candidates:

Mayoral Candidate	Vote	%
Jeffrey Francis Shaver (X)	Acclaimed	

==== Edwardsburgh/Cardinal ====
The entire council of Edwardsburgh/Cardinal has been elected by acclamation, including mayor Tory Deschamps.

List of candidates:

Mayoral Candidate	Vote	%
Tory Deschamps (X)	Acclaimed	

==== Elizabethtown-Kitley ====
Mayor Brant Burrow did not run for re-election. Running to replace him were councillor Rob Smith and dairy farmer Henry Oosterhof.

List of candidates:

Mayoral Candidate	Vote	%
Henry Oosterhof	1,978	57.18
Rob Smith	1,481	42.82

==== Front of Yonge ====
List of candidates:

Mayoral Candidate	Vote	%
Kirby Perkins	450	36.67
Carson Massey	392	31.95
Margaret Anne Fancy	385	31.38

==== Leeds and the Thousand Islands ====
Mayor Corinna Smith-Gatcke ran for re-election, and faced a challenger for the first time since 2018.

List of candidates:

Mayoral Candidate	Vote	%
Corinna Smith-Gatcke (X)	2,173	57.15
Jason Richard D. Page	1,629	42.85

==== Merrickville-Wolford ====
Mayor Michael Cameron was challenged by councillor Anne Barr.

List of candidates:

Mayoral Candidate	Vote	%
Anne Barr	1,059	65.74
Michael Cameron (X)	552	34.26

==== North Grenville ====
List of candidates:

Mayoral Candidate	Vote	%
Nancy Peckford (X)	Acclaimed	

==== Rideau Lakes ====
Mayor Arie Hoogenboom did not run for re-election. Running to replace him were former Perth mayor John Fenik, and councillor Paula Banks.

List of candidates:

Mayoral Candidate	Vote	%
John Fenik	2,822	45.98
Steve Weir	1,714	27.93
Paula Banks	969	15.79
Ronald Young	409	6.66
Kimberly Brown	223	3.63

==== Westport ====
List of candidates:

Mayoral Candidate	Vote	%
Joe Aragona	Acclaimed	

=== Lennox and Addington ===
Elections were held in Lennox and Addington County, Ontario on October 24, 2022 in conjunction with municipal elections across the province.

==== Lennox and Addington County Council ====
The Lennox and Addington County Council consists of the three municipal reeves, mayor of Greater Napanee and the three deputy reeves and the Deputy Reeve of Greater Napanee.

Position	Elected
Addington Highlands Reeve	Ken Hook (acclaimed)
Addington Highlands Deputy Reeve	(selected from council)
Greater Napanee Mayor	Terry Richardson (acclaimed)
Greater Napanee Deputy Mayor	Brian Calver
Loyalist Mayor	Jim Hegadorn (acclaimed)
Loyalist Deputy Mayor	Paul Proderick
Stone Mills Mayor	Shari Milligan (acclaimed)
Stone Mills Deputy Mayor	Rob Fenwick (acclaimed)

==== Addington Highlands ====
Deputy Reeve Ken Hook was elected reeve by acclamation.

===== Reeve =====
Reeve Candidate	Votes	%
Ken Hook	Acclaimed	

==== Greater Napanee ====
===== Mayor =====
Mayor Terry Richardson was re-elected by acclamation. He signed up to run in May.

Mayoral Candidate	Vote	%
Terry Richardson (X)	Acclaimed	

===== Deputy Mayor =====
Deputy Mayoral Candidate	Vote	%
Brian Calver (X)	2,508	49.84
Blair Campbell	1,420	28.22
Rennie Hutzler	1,104	21.94

==== Loyalist ====
List of candidates:

===== Mayor =====
Mayor Jim Hegadorn was re-elected by acclamation.

Mayoral Candidate	Vote	%
Jim Hegadorn (X)	Acclaimed	

===== Deputy Mayor =====
Deputy Mayoral Candidate	Vote	%
Paul Proderick	2,389	52.28
Mike Budarick	2,181	47.72

==== Stone Mills ====
===== Mayor =====
Councillor Shari Milligan has been elected as mayor by acclamation.

Mayoral Candidate	Vote	%
Shari Milligan	Acclaimed	

===== Deputy Mayor =====
Deputy Mayor Candidate	Vote	%
Rob Fenwick	Acclaimed	

=== Perth ===
==== Perth County Council ====
Perth County Council consists of 10 members and uses a weighted voting method so that member's votes match the populations of the constituent communities.

Position	Elected	Weighted votes
Perth East Mayor	Jerry Smith	2
Perth East Deputy Mayor	Bob McMillan	2
Perth East Councillor	Appointed by Township Council	2
Perth South Mayor	Sue Orr (acclaimed)	1
Perth South Deputy Mayor	Appointed by Township Council	1
West Perth Mayor	W. Dean Trentowsky	2
West Perth Deputy Mayor	Nicholas Vink	2
North Perth Mayor	Doug Kellum (acclaimed)	2
North Perth Deputy Mayor	Matthew Duncan	2
North Perth Councillor	Appointed by Municipal Council	2

==== North Perth ====
List of candidates:

===== Mayor =====
Mayor Todd Kasenberg did not run for re-election. Deputy mayor Doug Kellum was elected mayor by acclamation.

Mayoral Candidate	Vote	%
Doug Kellum	Acclaimed	

===== Deputy mayor =====
Deputy mayoral candidate	Vote	%
Matthew Duncan	2,296	66.55
Allan Rothwell	1,154	33.45

==== Perth East ====
List of candidates:

===== Mayor =====
Deputy mayor Hugh McDermid ran against Milverton Ward councillor Jerry Smith for mayor.

Mayoral Candidate	Vote	%
Jerry Smith	1,425	51.50
Hugh McDermid	1,342	48.50

===== Deputy mayor =====
Deputy mayoral candidate	Vote	%
Bob McMillan	1,623	59.71
Andrew MacAlpine	1,095	40.29

==== Perth South ====
Sue Orr was elected as mayor of Perth South by acclamation.

===== Mayor =====
Mayoral Candidate	Vote	%
Sue Orr (X)	Acclaimed	

==== West Perth ====
List of candidates:

===== Mayor =====
Mayor Walter McKenzie did not run for re-election. Running against him were county warden and deputy mayor Dean Trentowsky and former deputy mayor Doug Edit.

Mayoral Candidate	Vote	%
Dean Trentowsky	1,681	50.56
Doug Eidt	1,644	49.44

===== Deputy mayor =====
Deputy mayoral candidate	Vote	%
Nicholas Vink	2,130	68.14
Andrew Fournier	996	31.86

=== Peterborough ===
==== Peterborough County Council ====
Peterborough County Council consists of the mayors and deputy mayors from each of the county's constituent municipalities.

Position	Elected
Asphodel-Norwood Mayor	Patrick Wilford
Asphodel-Norwood Deputy Mayor	Tom Moher
Cavan Monaghan Mayor	Matthew Graham
Cavan Monaghan Deputy Mayor	Gerry Byrne
Douro-Dummer Mayor	Peter Leahy
Douro-Dummer Deputy Mayor	Samantha Turner
Havelock-Belmont-Methuen Mayor	David Sharpe
Havelock-Belmont-Methuen Deputy Mayor	Hart Webb
North Kawartha Mayor	Carolyn Amyotte (acclaimed)
North Kawartha Deputy Mayor	Ruth Anne McIlmoyl
Otonabee-South Monaghan Mayor	Bonnie Clark
Otonabee-South Monaghan Deputy Mayor	Mark Allen (acclaimed)
Selwyn Mayor	Ron Black (acclaimed)
Selwyn Deputy Mayor	John Boyko (acclaimed)
Trent Lakes Mayor	Terry Lambshead (acclaimed)
Trent Lakes Deputy Mayor	John Braybrook (acclaimed)

==== Asphodel-Norwood ====
List of candidates:

===== Mayor =====
Mayor Patrick Wilford ran for re-election. He was challenged by councillor Stephanie Hodge-Greaves, former mayor Rodger Bonneau and software builder Jesse Savary.

Mayoral Candidate	Vote	%
Patrick Wilford (X)	806	39.70
Rodger D. Bonneau	463	22.81
Bob Tytko	391	19.26
Stephanie Hodge-Greaves	346	17.04
Jesse Savary	24	1.18

===== Deputy mayor =====
Deputy mayoral candidate	Vote	%
Tom Moher	1,064	52.54
Lori Burtt (X)	961	47.46

==== Cavan Monaghan ====
List of candidates:

===== Mayor =====
Mayor Matthew Graham was challenged by former councillor Jim Chaplin, electrician and college professor Julia Herrick, and OPP constable and businessman Jaccob Burnett.

Mayoral Candidate	Vote	%
Matthew Graham (X)	1,632	46.47
Julia Herrick	831	23.66
Jim Chaplin	528	15.03
Jaccob Burnett	521	14.83

===== Deputy mayor =====
Deputy mayoral candidate	Vote	%
Gerry Byrne	1,928	56.77
Ryan Huntley (X)	1,468	43.23

==== Douro-Dummer ====
List of candidates:

===== Mayor =====
Mayor Heather Watson ran for re-election. Running against her was former mayor J. Murray Jones.

Mayoral Candidate	Vote	%
Peter Leahy	1,290	40.20
Heather Watson (X)	1,171	36.49
J. Murray Jones	748	23.31

===== Deputy mayor =====
Deputy mayoral candidate	Vote	%
Samantha Turner	1,929	61.28
Harold Nelson (X)	985	31.29
Melissa Webster	234	7.43

==== Havelock-Belmont-Methuen ====
List of candidates:

===== Mayor =====
Mayor Jim Martin was challenged by businessman David Sharpe.

Mayoral Candidate	Vote	%
David Sharpe	1,576	61.93
Jim Martin (X)	969	38.07

===== Deputy mayor =====
Deputy mayoral candidate	Vote	%
Hart Webb (X)	1,341	55.05
Kathy Clement	1,095	44.95

==== North Kawartha ====
List of candidates:

===== Mayor =====
Mayoral Candidate	Vote	%
Carolyn Amyotte (X)	Acclaimed	

===== Deputy mayor =====
Deputy mayoral candidate	Vote	%
Ruth Anne McIlmoyl	831	52.17
Collin McLellan	762	47.83

==== Otonabee-South Monaghan ====
List of candidates:

===== Mayor =====
Mayor Joe Taylor did not run for re-election. Running to replace him was deputy mayor and county warden Bonnie Clark.

Mayoral Candidate	Vote	%
Bonnie Clark	1,537	74.07
Scott Tower	538	25.93

===== Deputy mayor =====
Deputy mayoral candidate	Vote	%
Mark Allen	Acclaimed	

==== Selwyn ====
List of candidates:

===== Mayor =====
Mayor Sherry Senis announced she was not running for re-election. Deputy mayor Ron Black was the only candidate to replace her, and was elected by acclamation.

Mayoral Candidate	Vote	%
Ron Black	Acclaimed	

===== Deputy mayor =====
Deputy mayoral candidate	Vote	%
John Boyko	Acclaimed	

==== Trent Lakes ====
List of candidates:

===== Mayor =====
Mayoral Candidate	Vote	%
Terry Lambshead (X)	Acclaimed	

===== Deputy mayor =====
Deputy mayoral candidate	Vote	%
John Braybrook	Acclaimed	

=== Stormont, Dundas and Glengarry ===
==== Stormont, Dundas and Glengarry United Counties Council ====
Council consists of the mayors and deputy mayors of each of the townships.

Position	Elected
North Dundas Mayor	Theresa Bergeron
North Dundas Deputy Mayor	John Thompson
North Glengarry Mayor	Jamie MacDonald
North Glengarry Deputy Mayor	Elizabeth Caddell
North Stormont Mayor	Francois Landry (acclaimed)
North Stormont Deputy Mayor	Steven Densham (acclaimed)
South Dundas Mayor	Jason Broad
South Dundas Deputy Mayor	Bill Ewing
South Glengarry Mayor	Martin Lang (acclaimed)
South Glengarry Deputy Mayor	Stephanie Jaworski (acclaimed)
South Stormont Mayor	Andrew Guindon (acclaimed)
South Stormont Deputy Mayor	Jennifer MacIsaac (acclaimed)

==== North Dundas ====
===== Mayor =====
Mayoral Candidate	Vote	%
Theresa Bergeron	2,688	59.60
Tony Fraser (X)	1,822	40.40

===== Deputy mayor =====
Deputy Mayoral Candidate	Vote	%
John Thompson	3,240	72.91
William Healey	1,204	27.09

==== North Glengarry ====
===== Mayor =====
Mayor Jamie MacDonald ran for re-election. Running against him were businessman Victor Brassard, and entrepreneur Cody Pierce.

Mayoral Candidate	Vote	%
Jamie MacDonald (X)	2,353	51.61
Victor Brassard	1,110	24.35
Cody Pierce	672	14.74
Josee Jeaurond	314	6.89
Michel Levert	110	2.41

===== Deputy mayor =====
Deputy Mayoral Candidate	Vote	%
Elizabeth Caddell	1,877	43.38
Carma Williams (X)	1,433	33.12
Krista Williams	703	16.25
Julie Kaswurm	314	7.26

==== North Stormont ====
===== Mayor =====
Mayoral Candidate	Vote	%
Francois Landry (X)	Acclaimed	

===== Deputy mayor =====
Deputy Mayoral Candidate	Vote	%
Steven Densham (X)	Acclaimed	

==== South Dundas ====
===== Mayor =====
Mayor Jason Broad was challenged by Iroquois resident Ky-Lee Hanson.

Mayoral Candidate	Vote	%
Jason Broad (X)	3,829	83.17
Ky-Lee Hanson	775	16.83

===== Deputy mayor =====
Deputy Mayoral Candidate	Vote	%
Bill Ewing	2,338	50.26
Marc St. Pierre (X)	2,314	49.74

==== South Glengarry ====
===== Mayor =====
Mayor Lachlan McDonald did not run for re-election. Deputy mayor Martin Lang was elected as mayor by acclamation.

Mayoral Candidate	Vote	%
Martin Lang	Acclaimed	

===== Deputy mayor =====
Deputy Mayoral Candidate	Vote	%
Stephanie Jaworski	Acclaimed	

==== South Stormont ====
===== Mayor =====
Mayoral Candidate	Vote	%
Andrew Guindon	Acclaimed	

===== Deputy mayor =====
Deputy Mayoral Candidate	Vote	%
Jennifer MacIsaac	Acclaimed	

== Regional municipalities ==
Regional municipalities in Ontario are upper-tier municipalities, mostly located in urban and suburban parts of Southern Ontario. They are made up of a number of lower-tier municipalities.

=== Muskoka ===
==== Muskoka District Council ====
The Muskoka District Council, is made up of a 23 member council which includes the mayors of its six municipalities, three councillors each from Bracebridge, Gravenhurst, Huntsville and Muskoka Lakes, two each from Lake of Bays and Georgian Bay, plus a District Chair, which will be appointed by the provincial government, following the passage of the Following the passage of the "Better Regional Governance Act".

Position	Elected
Chair
Scott Aitchison (Appointed by provincial government)
Bracebridge
Mayor	Rick Maloney
District Councillor	Brenda Rhodes
District Councillor	Don Smith
District Councillor	Tatiana Sutherland
Georgian Bay
Mayor	Peter Koetsier
District Councillor, Wards 1 & 3	Laurie Russell
District Councillor, Wards 2 & 4	Rod Northey (acclaimed)
Gravenhurst
Mayor	Jeff Watson
District Councillor	Sandy Cairns
District Councillor	Penny Varney
District Councillor	Jaden Hollingshead
Huntsville
Mayor	Scott Morrison
District Councillor	Bob Stone
District Councillor	Helena Renwick
District Councillor	James Bowler
Lake of Bays
Mayor	Matt Young
District Councillor, Franklin & Sinclair Wards	Rick Brooks
District Councillor, Ridout & McLean Wards	Robert Lacroix (acclaimed)
Muskoka Lakes
Mayor	Peter Kelley (acclaimed)
District Councillor, Ward 1	Glenn Zavitz
District Councillor, Ward 2	Susan Mazan (acclaimed)
District Councillor, Ward 3	Guy Burry

==== Bracebridge ====
Mayor Rick Maloney announced on May 20 that he was running for re-election.

List of candidates:

===== Mayor =====
Candidate	Vote	%
Rick Maloney (X)	3,731	64.42
Norman Raynor	2,051	35.58

===== District Councillors =====
Three to be elected.

Candidate	Vote	%
Brenda Rhodes (X)	3,971	28.28
Don Smith (X)	3,747	26.69
Tatiana Sutherland (X)	3,657	26.05
Christian McEachran Morin	2,662	18.96

==== Georgian Bay ====
List of candidates:

===== Mayor =====
Candidate	Vote	%
Peter Koetsier (X)	1,462	58.64
Arthur Christakos	1,031	41.36

===== District Councillors =====
Candidate	Vote	%
Wards 1 & 3
Laurie Russell	820	57.46
Brian Bochek (X)	607	42.54
Wards 2 & 4
Rod Northey	Acclaimed	

==== Gravenhurst ====
List of candidates:

===== Mayor =====
Mayor Heidi Lorenz ran for re-election. She was challenged by councillor Jo Morphy, and former deputy mayor Jeff Watson.

Candidate	Vote	%
Jeff Watson	1,869	32.69
Jo Morphy	1,633	28.56
Heidi Lorenz (X)	1,460	25.53
Marc Mantha	756	13.22

===== District Councillors =====
Three to be elected.

Candidate	Vote	%
Sandy Cairns (X)	3,072	23.52
Penny Varney	2,823	21.61
Jaden Hollingshead	2,668	20.42
Christina Hunter	2,369	18.13
Erin Strength (X)	2,132	16.32

==== Huntsville ====
List of candidates:

===== Mayor =====
Mayor Nancy Alcock did not run for re-election. Running for the town's top were deputy mayor Dan Armour, business owner Dan Caswell, law student Rebecca Mello, and district councillor Scott Morrison.

Candidate	Vote	%
Scott Morrison	4,102	45.12
Dan Caswell	2,440	26.84
Dan Armour	2,200	24.20
Rebecca Mello	349	3.84

===== District Councillors =====
Three to be elected.

Candidate	Vote	%
Bob Stone (X)	4,900	24.63
Helena Renwick	4,332	21.77
James Bowler	3,187	16.02
Leland Maw	2,964	14.90
Brian Ellas	2,792	14.03
Peggy Peterson	1,723	8.66

==== Lake of Bays ====
List of candidates:

===== Mayor =====
Running for mayor of Lake of Bays were businessman Charles Cooper, former Hunstville councillor Tim Withey, and Matt Young, CEO of SPY Communications.

Candidate	Vote	%
Matt Young	1,333	50.28
Tim Withey	713	26.90
Charles Cooper	605	22.82

===== District Councillors =====
Candidate	Vote	%
Franklin/Sinclair Ward
Rick Brooks	814	61.71
John Crowley	505	38.29
Ridout/Mclean Ward
Robert Lacroix (X)	Acclaimed	

==== Muskoka Lakes ====
List of candidates:

===== Mayor =====
Mayor Peter Kelley was re-elected by acclamation.

Candidate	Vote	%
Peter Kelley (X)	Acclaimed	

===== District Councillors =====
Candidate	Vote	%
Ward A
Glenn Zavitz	649	55.76
Ruth Nishikawa (X)	515	44.24
Ward B
Susan Mazan	Acclaimed	
Ward C
Guy Burry (X)	1,015	55.80
Barb Bridgeman	804	44.20
