= Michael Eamon =

Canadian politician and academic

His Worship Michael Eamon

64th Mayor of Peterborough
- Incumbent
- Assumed office November 19, 2026
- Preceded by: Jeff Leal

Personal details
- Born: 1972 (age 53–54)
- Party: Independent
- Spouse: Jennine Hurl-Eamon
- Children: 2
- Education: University of Ottawa (BA (Hons)); Queen's University (MA; PhD); University of Cambridge (MPHil)

Michael Eamon (born 1972) is a Canadian politician and academic who serves as the 64th and current mayor of Peterborough. Prior to his election as mayor, Eamon was an adjunct professor of history and principal of Catharine Parr Traill College at Trent University.

== Early life and education ==
Eamon was raised in Brockville, Ontario, and graduated as valedictorian from Brockville Collegiate Institute in 1991. He subsequently earned a Bachelor of Arts (Honours) in history from the University of Ottawa, a Master of Arts and PhD from Queen's University, and a Master of Philosophy from the University of Cambridge, all in history.

== Career ==
Before entering academia, Eamon worked as a plaque historian for the Ontario Heritage Trust and held managerial positions at Library and Archives Canada. In 2009, he joined Trent University as an adjunct professor of history. He served as principal of the university's Lady Eaton College from 2012 to 2014 and of Catharine Parr Traill College from July 2014 until assuming office as mayor of Peterborough in November 2026.

In 2015, Eamon published Imprinting Britain: How the Printing Press Helped to Shape British North America.

=== Mayor of Peterborough ===
In May 2026, Eamon announced his candidacy for mayor of Peterborough. He was elected in the municipal election held on October 26, receiving 10,867 votes. Eamon and the newly elected Peterborough City Council were sworn into office on November 19, 2026, during a ceremony at the Mount Community Centre.

== Bibliography ==
- Imprinting Britain: How the Printing Press Helped to Shape British North America. McGill–Queen's University Press, 2015. ISBN 0773544917
