= Alene Holt =

Canadian politician

- Born: November 8, 1908; Stratford, Ontario, Canada
- Died: January 3, 1987 (aged 78); Peterborough, Ontario, Canada
- Other names: Aileen Holt, Alene E Cooper
- Occupation: Politician
- Known for: Being the first female mayor of Peterborough, Ontario

Alene E. Holt (sometimes spelled Aileen Holt; 1908–1987) was a Canadian politician. She was the first female alderman for Peterborough, Ontario, elected in 1959 and the first female mayor, appointed in 1962.

Holt was involved in many community causes in the city of Peterborough including efforts to support the Second World War through victory bonds and volunteer service groups like the Kinettes. Holt was also a columnist for the Peterborough Examiner, particularly writing about women's issues. She began her political career on the city planning board and went on to become Peterborough's first female alderman and first female mayor.

== Personal life ==
Holt was born in Stratford, Ontario. She lived in Chalk River and Windsor before moving to Peterborough. While in Windsor, she graduated from the Western Business College. As a youth she won several awards as a mezzo-soprano vocalist.

Holt moved to Peterborough in 1940 with her husband Maurice, after he was offered a position as manager with the local Household Finance office.

Holt was active in many community organizations. She joined the congregation at the St John's Anglican Church. She was an Honorary member of the Soroptimist International Peterborough club. She founded the local Kinettes, a division of the Kinsmen Club, as well as the local chapter of the Beta Sigma Phi sorority. She was also deeply involved with the Canadian Cancer Society. She was also an avid golfer and curler at the Peterborough Golf and Country Club.

For many years, Holt wrote a "Ladies' column" for the Peterborough Examiner.

She was also very involved in organizing to support the Canadian Second World War efforts. She took a leadership role in organizing events for the Victory Loan campaign, a fundraising initiative for the Canadian engagement in the War. The Peterborough Examiner documented several events wherein local community groups provided music and there were radio broadcasts. At one such evening, local actors performed a radio play called The Temptation of Anthony Blinker by Samuel Marchbanks (alias Robertson Davies). Holt played the level-headed wife who advises her husband to buy victory bonds.

As historian Elwood Jones notes, "Alene Holt had very quickly become part of the local community, and her active leadership in organizing Beta Phi Sigma and the Victory Loan campaign brought her into contact with many people. She cared about people and this would be a great help to her when she turned to municipal politics in the 1950s."

While in Peterborough she lived in "a marvelous home on Dublin Street". Here she hosted distinguished guests such as prime ministers John Diefenbaker, Lester B. Pearson, and Pierre Trudeau, as well as notable persons such as William Earl Rowe, Robert Stanfield, Pauline Mills McGibbon, and Roland Michener.

== Political career ==
Her municipal career began when Gordon Fraser and Senator Iva Fallis approached Holt to see if she was interested in running for a seat on the local Board of Education. This didn't appeal to Holt but in 1954 she took her first step into municipal politics serving as a member of the city planning board from 1954 to 1960.

In 1959, Holt became the first woman on Peterborough, Ontario City Council when she was elected alderman for Ashburnham Ward. She served in this position until 1970, except for a period in 1962 when she served as mayor of Peterborough, the first woman to hold the position. At the time, she set the record for longest Aldermanic term.

In 1959, Holt was appointed as an alternate delegate with the Canadian Delegation to the Fourteenth Session of the General Assembly of the United Nations. She served as a representative on the Social, Humanitarian and Cultural Committee. During this trip she bumped elbows with "such well-known persons as Golda Meir and Indira Gandhi." While in New York for this trip, she began her campaign for alderman in the 1959 municipal election.

In 1960, members of the Peterborough Review voted to honour Holt with the distinction ‘Citizen of the Year’. She received 327 more votes than local MPP Keith Brown. She was the second woman to receive the award - the first was a synchronized swimming teacher named Pansy Forbes.

Holt was also very engaged with provincial politics and she was involved with the Progressive Conservative Party, both provincially and federally. She served as President of the Ontario Progressive Conservatives Women's Association as well as the Peterborough Progressive Conservatives Women's Association. She served as the Regional Representative on the Women's Advisory Committee for Ontario. And she was Chair of the Women's Activity Committee 1967 Centennial Planning Branch and the Department of Tourism and Information of Ontario. In 1960, she also ran for the Conservative nomination in a federal by-election to succeed Gordon K. Fraser as Member of Parliament. She lost that race to Cyril Matthews who was defeated in the election by NDP candidate Walter Pitman. This loss didn't set her back far as shortly thereafter Holt was able to commit her attention to a long-running career in municipal politics.

In 1962, sitting mayor Stan McBride resigned his position after he was appointed sheriff. The Peterborough City Council chose Holt to succeed him for the rest of the term. At the end of this term, she chose to run to for mayor but lost the election to Clarence Boorman.

In 1968, Holt was awarded the Canadian Centennial Medal for Valuable Service to the Nation.

Holt retired from municipal politics, six years after her last term as alderman, in 1976. She was paralyzed with a spinal tumor and stated that she could no longer attend meetings at City Hall. The building was not wheelchair accessible and up until that point she had relied on assistance from firefighters to get in and out. She went on to sit on the provincial Social Assistance Review Board in 1978.

At various points during her political career Holt served as chair of all standing committees of council and chair of special committees such as Public Relations and Development Week Programmes. She also served as city council's representative at the Chamber of Commerce, Arts & Water Festival Board, and at the 1975 Trent University Homecoming committee.

For a profile in the book Portraits: Peterborough area women past and present Holt remarks on the challenges for women in politics, saying, "Politics is exhausting. When a woman is at home raising a family, she probably doesn't have time to become involved in politics." The writer of this article goes on to say, "This is a problem, points out Mrs. Holt, because by the time the children have reached an independent stage, it is probably too late for that woman to seek political office."
