= Jeff Leal =

Canadian politician

The Honourable Jeff Leal ECO

63rd Mayor of Peterborough
- In office November 15, 2022 – November 19, 2026
- Preceded by: Diane Therrien
- Succeeded by: Michael Eamon

Member of the Ontario Provincial Parliament for Peterborough
- In office October 2, 2003 – June 6, 2018
- Preceded by: Gary Stewart
- Succeeded by: Dave Smith
Additional offices held
Minister of Agriculture, Food and Rural Affairs
In office June 24, 2014 – June 29, 2018
| Premier | Kathleen Wynne |
| Preceded by | Kathleen Wynne (as Ministry of Agriculture and Food) |
| Succeeded by | Ernie Hardeman |
Minister of Rural Affairs
In office February 11, 2013 – June 24, 2014
| Premier | Kathleen Wynne |
| Preceded by | Ted McMeekin |
| Succeeded by | Himself as Minister of Agriculture, Food and Rural Affairs |
Member of Peterborough City Council for Ward 1 Otonabee
In office 1985–2003 Serving with Glenn Pagett (1985–1997); Nancy Branscombe (1997–2000)
| Succeeded by | Paul Rexe; Garry Herring |

Personal details
- Born: John Jeffrey Leal; December 13, 1954 (age 71) Peterborough, Ontario, Canada
- Party: Independent
- Other political affiliations: Ontario Liberal
- Spouse: Karan Leal
- Children: 2
- Education: Trent University (BA (Hons)); University of Windsor
- Occupation: Politician

John Jeffrey Leal (born December 13, 1954) is a retired Canadian politician who served as the 63rd mayor of Peterborough from 2022 to 2026. He previously represented the riding of Peterborough in the Legislative Assembly of Ontario from 2003 to 2018, serving as Minister of Agriculture, Food and Rural Affairs in the cabinet of Kathleen Wynne. Before entering provincial politics, Leal served on Peterborough City Council from 1985 to 2003.

== Background ==
John Jeffrey Leal was born and raised in Peterborough. He attended Kenner Collegiate and has a Bachelor of Arts (Honours) degree in Economics and Political Science from Trent University (1978) and a degree in Business Administration from the University of Windsor (1981). Leal worked as executive assistant to members of Provincial Parliament (MPPs) John Eakins and Larry South in the 1980s. He was a health and safety representative for Coyle Corrugated Containers. He is married to Karan, a teacher and school principal, with two children, Braden and Shanae.

== Controversies ==
On April 10, 2025 the Peterborough Examiner obtained an audio recording of Leal using a racial slur (the N-word) against Black people during his appearance as a guest lecturer at a Trent University business administration class. He has since issued an apology but has refused to confirm the nature of the word's usage.

In May 2025, the city's integrity commissioner also published a report alleging that Leal had intimidated and bullied two councilors. Media reports allege that Leal threatened a city councilor during a public meeting by saying that he would "carve him like a Thanksgiving turkey." In June council voted against penalizing Leal for his comments.

== Politics ==
=== Municipal ===
He served on the Peterborough City Council from 1985 to 2003, representing the Otonabee Ward. At City Hall he was appointed as Deputy Mayor (1993-2003) and chaired the social services committee after the 2000 municipal election. In July 2022, Leal announced his candidacy for mayor of Peterborough, which he would later win. He did not seek reelection in 2026.

2000 Peterborough municipal election: Council, Otonabee Ward (two members elected)
| Candidate | Votes | % |
|---|---|---|
| (x)Jeff Leal | 3,461 | 41.15 |
| Glenn Pagett | 3,182 | 37.83 |
| Allan Deck | 1,768 | 21.02 |
| Total valid votes | 8,411 | 100.00 |

=== Provincial ===
Leal ran for provincial office in the 1999 provincial election as the Liberal candidate. He was narrowly defeated by Progressive Conservative incumbent Gary Stewart. He defeated Stewart by over six thousand votes in a 2003 rematch, amid a provincial shift to the Liberal Party. Leal was re-elected in 2007, 2011 and 2014.

During his time in government, he has served as Parliamentary Assistant to several ministers including Ministry of Training, Colleges and Universities (2004), Ministry of Economic Development and Trade (2005), Ministry of Energy (2005), Ministry of the Environment (2006), and the Ministry of Aboriginal Affairs (2007–09). In February 2010, he was named the Chief Government Whip.

In February 2013, Premier Kathleen Wynne named Leal to Ontario's Cabinet, serving in the role as Minister of Rural Affairs.

Leal has helped secure over $400 million in funding for Peterborough, creating and preserving over 3,700 jobs with investments in infrastructure, transportation, businesses and health care. This included the creation of a new hospital, Peterborough Regional Health Centre, and funding following a damaging flood in 2004.

Leal has championed a number of issues through private member's bills, including retirement and income security measures. He introduced a private member's bill in 2008 to provide creditor protection for Registered Retirement Savings Plans (RRSPs). Two years later, he introduced a separate bill that would require companies with twenty or more employees to offer a savings or pension plan that all employees would automatically join (with the ability to opt out). The stated purpose of this bill, which was supported by the Canadian Life and Health Insurance Association, was to reduce the costs of such insurance plans compared with retail mutual funds.

In June 2014, Leal was appointed as the Minister of Agriculture and Food and Rural Affairs.

=== Cabinet positions ===
Wynne ministry, Province of Ontario (2013–2018)
Cabinet post (1)
| Predecessor | Office | Successor |
|---|---|---|
| Ted McMeekin | Minister of Agriculture, Food and Rural Affairs; 2013–2018; Was Minister of Rural Affairs in 2013–2014 | Ernie Hardeman |

=== Electoral record ===
2018 Ontario general election: Peterborough—Kawartha
| Party | Candidate | Votes | % | ±% |
|---|---|---|---|---|
| Progressive Conservative | Dave Smith | 22,904 | 37.68 | +6.96 |
| New Democratic | Sean Conway | 20,518 | 33.75 | +15.65 |
| Liberal | Jeff Leal | 14,946 | 24.59 | –21.12 |
| Green | Gianne Broughton | 2,024 | 3.33 | –0.96 |
| Libertarian | Jacob William Currier | 245 | 0.40 | – |
| Stop Climate Change | Ken Ranney | 153 | 0.25 | – |
| Total valid votes | | 60,790 | 98.79 | |
| Total rejected, unmarked and declined ballots | | 744 | 1.21 | |
| Turnout | | 61,534 | 62.75 | |
| Eligible voters | | 98,070 | | |
| Progressive Conservative notional gain from Liberal | | Swing | | +14.04 |
Source: Elections Ontario

2014 Ontario general election: Peterborough
| Party | Candidate | Votes | % | ±% |
|---|---|---|---|---|
| Liberal | Jeff Leal | 24,709 | 46.33 | +6.40 |
| Progressive Conservative | Scott Stewart | 15,907 | 29.83 | –1.66 |
| New Democratic | Sheila Wood | 9,728 | 18.24 | –7.37 |
| Green | Gary Beamish | 2,287 | 4.29 | +1.75 |
| Independent | Brian Martindale | 395 | 0.74 | – |
| Socialist | Andrea Quiano | 132 | 0.25 | +0.08 |
| Freedom | Wayne Matheson | 121 | 0.23 | –0.03 |
| Pauper | Gerard Faux | 52 | 0.10 | – |
| Total valid votes | | 53,331 | 98.85 | |
| Total rejected, unmarked and declined ballots | | 622 | 1.15 | +0.70 |
| Turnout | | 53,953 | 57.30 | +4.11 |
| Eligible voters | | 94,167 | | |
| Liberal hold | | Swing | | +4.03 |
Source: Elections Ontario

2011 Ontario general election
| Party | Candidate | Votes | % | ±% |
|---|---|---|---|---|
| Liberal | Jeff Leal | 19,319 | 39.79 | -8.01 |
| Progressive Conservative | Alan Wilson | 15,309 | 31.53 | +5.93 |
| New Democratic | Dave Nickle | 12,458 | 25.66 | +9.06 |
| Green | Gary Beamish | 1,235 | 2.54 | -6.16 |
| Freedom | Alex Long | 127 | 0.26 | |
| Socialist | Ken Ranney | 104 | 0.21 | |
| Total valid votes | | | 100.0 | |

2007 Ontario general election: Peterborough
| Party | Candidate | Votes | % | ±% | Expenditures |
|---|---|---|---|---|---|
| Liberal | Jeff Leal | 24,466 | 47.72 | +2.97 | $95,432 |
| Progressive Conservative | Bruce Fitzpatrick | 13,176 | 25.70 | –7.77 | $89,425 |
| New Democratic | Dave Nickle | 8,523 | 16.62 | –1.18 | $33,229 |
| Green | Miriam Stucky | 4,473 | 8.72 | +5.81 | $10,163 |
| Family Coalition | Paul Morgan | 634 | 1.24 | +0.48 | $0 |
| Total valid votes | | 51,272 | 99.53 | | |
| Total rejected, unmarked and declined ballots | | 241 | 0.47 | +0.02 | |
| Turnout | | 51,513 | 57.47 | –5.29 | |
| Eligible voters | | 89,627 | | | |
| Liberal hold | | Swing | | +5.37 | |
Source: Elections Ontario

2003 Ontario general election: Peterborough
| Party | Candidate | Votes | % | ±% | Expenditures |
|---|---|---|---|---|---|
| Liberal | Jeff Leal | 24,626 | 44.74 | +4.55 | $59,358 |
| Progressive Conservative | Gary Stewart | 18,418 | 33.46 | –11.53 | $83,317 |
| New Democratic | Dave Nickle | 9,796 | 17.80 | +4.80 | $22,783 |
| Green | Tim Holland | 1,605 | 2.92 | +1.81 | $6,817 |
| Family Coalition | Max Murray | 414 | 0.75 | – | $212 |
| Independent | Bob Bowers | 178 | 0.32 | +0.05 | not listed |
| Total valid votes | | 55,037 | 99.56 | | |
| Total rejected, unmarked and declined ballots | | 245 | 0.44 | –0.10 | |
| Turnout | | 55,282 | 62.76 | –0.00 | |
| Eligible voters | | 88,080 | | | |
| Liberal gain from Progressive Conservative | | Swing | | +8.04 | |
Source: Elections Ontario

1999 Ontario general election: Peterborough
| Party | Candidate | Votes | % | ±% | Expenditures |
|---|---|---|---|---|---|
| Progressive Conservative | Gary Stewart | 24,422 | 44.99 | –7.67 | $66,248 |
| Liberal | Jeff Leal | 21,820 | 40.20 | +16.28 | $45,608 |
| New Democratic | Dave Nickle | 7,058 | 13.00 | –4.56 | $26,105 |
| Green | Larry J. Tyldsley | 598 | 1.10 | – | $1,651 |
| Independent | Bob Bowers | 151 | 0.28 | – | $862 |
| Independent | Kenneth Thomas Burgess | 125 | 0.23 | – | not listed |
| Natural Law | Robert Mayer | 106 | 0.20 | –0.30 | $0 |
| Total valid votes | | 54,280 | 99.46 | | |
| Total rejected, unmarked and declined ballots | | 297 | 0.54 | –0.21 | |
| Turnout | | 54,577 | 62.77 | –3.46 | |
| Eligible voters | | 86,951 | | | |
| Progressive Conservative hold | | Swing | | –11.98 | |
Source: Elections Ontario
