= BBC1 (disambiguation) =

BBC One of the British Broadcasting Corporation is a television network in the United Kingdom.

Bbc1 or BBC1 may also refer to:

- Bbc1 (gene), coding for 60S ribosomal protein L13
- BBC Radio 1, British radio network
- BBC Radio 1Xtra, British sister station of Radio 1
- 믁 (U+BBC1), unicode character; see List of modern Hangul characters in ISO/IEC 2022–compliant national character set standards

== See also ==
- BBC First, international television service
- BBCi (disambiguation)
- BBC (disambiguation)
