= Brockville Collegiate Institute =

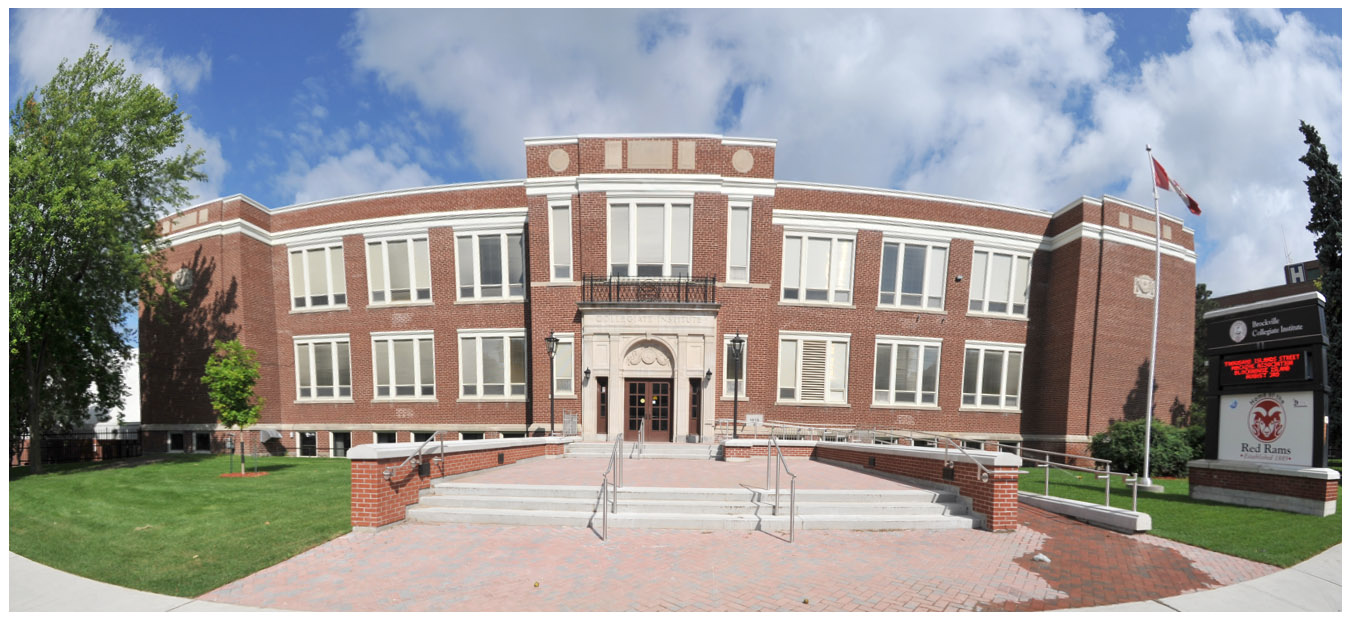
- After the Renovations in August 2008

Location
- 90 Pearl Street East; Brockville, Ontario, K6V 1P8; Canada; 44°35′45″N 75°40′57″W

Information
- School type: Public high school
- Founded: 1889
- School board: Upper Canada District School Board
- Principal: Danielle Ouellet Intermediate Vice Principal = Secondary Vice Principal = Shannon Hughes
- Grades: 7 to 12
- Mascot: Ram
- Team name: Red Rams
- Feeder schools: Commonwealth; Front of Yonge; Lyn; Maynard; Meadowview; Thousand Islands Elementary School; Toniata; Pineview; Westminster; Vanier
- Website: www.ucdsb.on.ca/Schools/School+Directory/Secondary/bci/homepage.htm

Brockville Collegiate Institute (BCI) is a Brockville public intermediate and high school that follows the Ontario curriculum.

The French immersion and extended core French programs involve approximately 125 students in grades 9–12. Business, mathematics, computers, science, liberal arts, and communication programs have produced many graduates, who have gone on to pursue careers in medicine, engineering, law, computer technology and business.

The school draws from ten public elementary schools, one separate elementary school, and one French Catholic elementary school and represent a variety of ethno-cultural and socio-economic backgrounds. It has a high level of student leadership and participation in many school activities including athletic Association, student council, yearbook, sound and lighting crew and the arts program. Nine tenths of the students pursues studies at the postsecondary level.

A number of school partnerships are linked to the co-operative education program; each year, 50–60 students are placed with employers in the Brockville community.

The school facilities (the auditorium and the gymnasium) are used by many community groups. Students are also involved in volunteering with community organizations and elementary schools.

== History ==
Brockville Collegiate Institute was built on the present site in 1889 and was formally opened for the fall term in September of that year. It was originally known as Brockville High School before it change its name. The grey stone building of simple and dignified architecture stood near the centre of the block between Orchard St. and Ormond St. And faced Pearl St. on the south. A beautiful lawn in front extended the length of the block and was terraced to the playgrounds of the boys and the girls at the rear.

The school's basement had cloakrooms for pupils and a furnace room. The main floor had an office and a library in a shallow extension at the front and three classrooms on the north. The second floor held a laboratory above the office, and an assembly room and one classroom. The third floor had two gyms for boys and girls.

John McMullen, the author of A History of Canada and editor of The Brockville Monitor, was the head of the building committee. The citizens felt that at last, they had a splendid school, which would serve the town for ages. The new school evidently attracted more pupils, and soon, a small classroom was partitioned off the assembly room, which was required for classes as well.

In 1909, a north wing was added, containing the gymnasium on the ground floor, a laboratory and a classroom and, on the second floor, a large assembly hall, but that too proved quite inadequate for the growing numbers, and the assembly hall was divided by temporary partitions into three classrooms. The two gymnasiums of the original building had long been used for very unsatisfactory classrooms.

The school burned down on March 8, 1929, but it reopened two years later by architect George Roper Gouinlock, son for prominent architect George Wallace Gouinlock.

Twenty-seven alumni were killed serving in World War I and forty-six in World War II. A bronze memorial plaque is dedicated as a list of honour to the former students of Brockville Collegiate Institute and Vocational School who died in both wars.

== Administration ==
The school is a member of the Upper Canada District School Board (UCDSB). Its feeder public elementary schools in the area include Commonwealth, Front of Yonge, Lyn, Maynard, Meadowview, Thousand Islands Elementary School, Thousand Island Secondary School, Toniata, Pineview, Westminster, St. Mary, Vanier, St. Francis Xavier, and J.L. Jordan.

There are approximately 760 students.

== Academics ==
The school performs well in provincial academic testing, and an estimated 90% of its graduates continue to postsecondary education. In March 2007 it became the first school in the UCDSB to score 100% on the Ontario Secondary School Literacy Test, with the provincial average being 84%.

In November 2006, BCI became accredited to offer the prestigious, internationally recognized International Baccalaureate program.

The school offers French immersion and extended core French programs.

Through its cooperative education courses, 50–70 students have work-study placements in the community.

In addition to those programs and the core curriculum, the school also offers students courses in such subjects as music theatre, food and nutrition, English media, multimedia, music, art, photography, drama, leadership, and peer support.

== Extracurricular activities ==
The school also offers its students a wide range of extracurricular activities in athletics and service clubs.

School teams compete in badminton, basketball, cross country running, football, baseball, hockey, rowing (through an association with the Brockville Rowing Club), rugby, soccer, track and field, and volleyball.

Other extracurricular opportunities include the student council, the yearbook club, the Sound and Lighting Crew, Reach for the Top teams (which have placed as high as fourth provincially), the Rambotics Robotics Club, math teams, the Enviro-Club, the United Nations Club, the Ontario Students against Drunk Driving, grad Club, and a Link Crew.

In November 2010 the senior football team defeated Smith Falls 12–0 to win the EOSSAA championship and became the first BCI squad to advance to the National Capital Bowl, which was held at Trent University in Peterborough. The Rams faced Adam Scott of Peterborough and were defeated but marked a milestone for the team football and athletics in general.

In March 2014, the girls' curling team won the EOSSAA championship and then the silver medal at the OFSAA provincial championships. The team repeated that performance at the OFSAA provincials in 2015.

== Notable alumni ==
- Michael Eamon, mayor of Peterborough, Ontario
- Andrew Preston

== See also ==
- Education in Ontario
- List of secondary schools in Ontario

== Sources ==
- https://web.archive.org/web/20080516102930/http://dmgrant.wordpress.com/2008/05/11/the-old-brockville-collegiate-1889-1929/
- https://web.archive.org/web/20080405035235/http://eqaoweb.eqao.com/
- http://www.ucdsb.on.ca/Schools/School+Directory/Secondary/BCI
- http://www.brockvillemuseum.com
- https://web.archive.org/web/20080214075443/http://www.ibo.com/
- http://www.alumni.utoronto.ca/groups/Soldiers/macdowell.htm
- http://www.brockvillefire.ca
