= BBCi =

BBCi can refer to:

- BBC Online, the website of the BBC, formerly known as BBCi between 2001 and 2004
- BBC Red Button, the BBC digital television text service, known as BBCi between 2001 and 2008
- Bombay, Baroda, and Central India Railway (BB&CI), an Indian rail company
- Banque Burundaise pour le Commerce et l'Investissement

== See also ==
- Bbc1 (disambiguation)
- BBC (disambiguation)
