= Peterborough City Council (Ontario) =

2026–2030 Peterborough City Council

Overview
- Legislative body: Peterborough City Council
- Meeting place: Peterborough City Hall
- Term: November 19, 2026 –
- Election: 2026 Peterborough municipal election
- Website: www.peterborough.ca/council-city-hall/mayor-and-council/

City Council
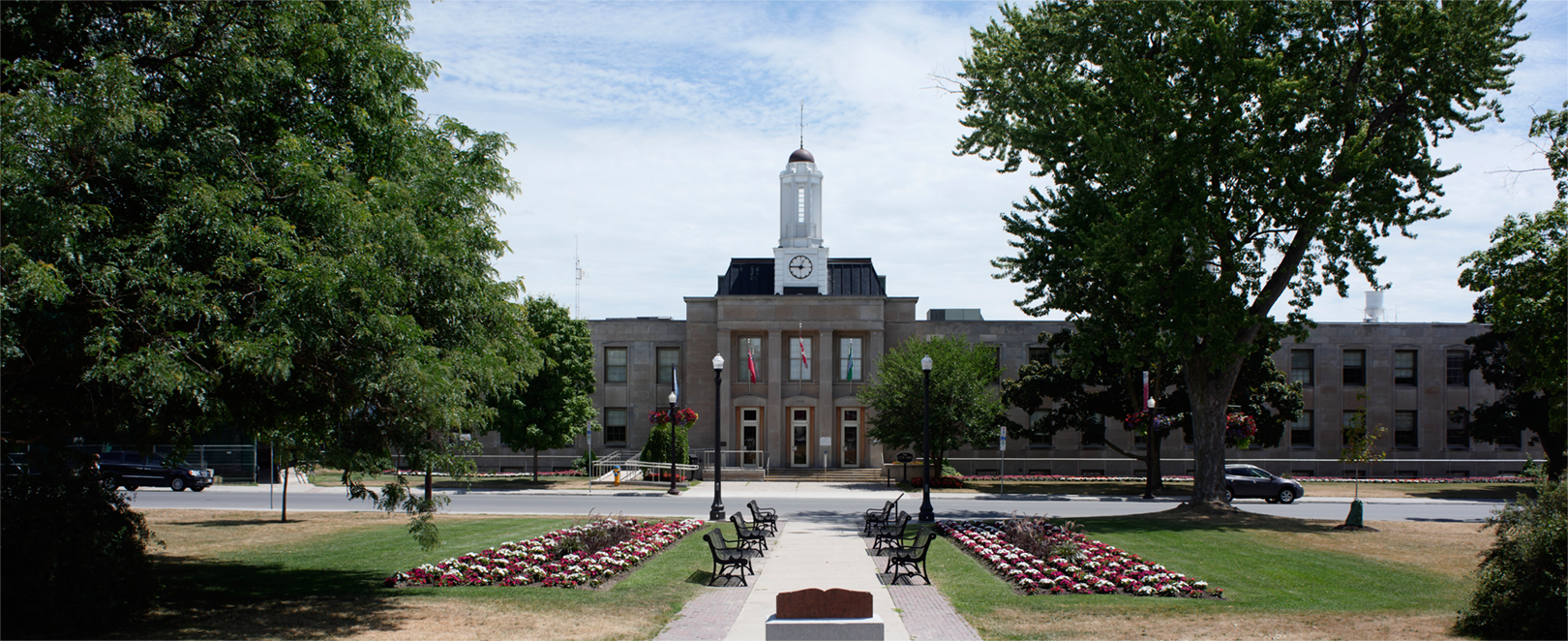
- Peterborough City Hall
- Members: 11
- Mayor: Michael Eamon

The 2026–2023 Peterborough City Council is the current term of Peterborough City Council, the governing body of Peterborough, Ontario, Canada. It began on November 19, 2026, following the 2026 Peterborough municipal election held on October 26. The council consists of 10 councillors elected from individual wards and the mayor of Peterborough, who is elected citywide.

Michael Eamon was elected mayor in the 2026 election.

== Composition ==
Members of Peterborough City Council, 2026–2030
Position	Elected
Mayor
Michael Eamon
Ward 1 Otonabee
Councillor	Lesley Parnell
Councillor	Chris Potter
Ward 2 Monaghan
Councillor	Matt Crowley
Councillor	AJ Shearer
Ward 3 Town
Councillor	Alex Bierk
Councillor	Joy Lachica
Ward 4 Ashburnham
Councillor	Ashley Bonner
Councillor	Jason Stabler
Ward 5 Northcrest
Councillor	Andrew Beamer
Councillor	Charmaine Magumbe
