= Public Order Emergency Commission =

2022 Canadian public inquiry

- Commission sur l'état d'urgence

Commission overview
- Formed: 25 April 2022
- Type: Public inquiry
- Jurisdiction: Government of Canada
- Commission executive: Paul Rouleau, commissioner
- Website: publicorderemergencycommission.ca

Inquiry into Emergencies Act

Parliament of Canada
- Long title: An Act to authorize the taking of special temporary measures to ensure safety and security during national emergencies and to amend other Acts in consequence thereof
- Citation: R.S.C., 1985, c. 22 (4th Supp.)

The Public Order Emergency Commission (POEC; French: Commission sur l'état d'urgence), also known as the Rouleau inquiry or the Inquiry into Emergencies Act, was a public inquiry in Canada that investigated the invoking of the Emergencies Act on February 14, 2022, by the government of Prime Minister Justin Trudeau during the Canada convoy protests. It was the first time the Emergencies Act had been invoked and it remained in place from February 14–23, 2022, the POEC investigated "the circumstances that led to the declaration being issued and the measures taken for dealing with the emergency". The inquiry was led by commissioner Justice Paul Rouleau, who was appointed by Prime Minister Justin Trudeau on April 25, 2022. Justice Rouleau had a surgical intervention which delayed the inquiry from September 19, 2022, to mid-October. The inquiry is independent of the parliamentary review committee.

Public hearings were held at the Winifred Bambrick Room in Ottawa from October 13 until December 2, 2022. During the 31 days of hearings which spanned six weeks, 77 witnesses provided testimonies and were questioned by lawyers. About 7,000 documents including "text and email messages, cabinet documents, transcripts and witness statements" were submitted. Along with these documents, on November 16, the inquiry heard summaries of the 9,500 submissions made by the general public who had replied to the request for submissions from August through October 31. Videos and transcripts of all the public hearings were made available online. On November 28, the policy phase began with a series of discussions on potential recommendations.

The five volumes of the Report of the Public Inquiry into the 2022 Public Order Emergency were released on February 17, 2023. The report found that the Trudeau government met the "very high threshold" for invoking the Emergencies Act after failures by police and politicians to address the protests.

A government press release said it is hoped investigations will "prevent these events from happening again".

== Formation ==
On April 25, 2022, Trudeau appointed Justice Paul Rouleau as commissioner of an inquiry into the invocation of the Emergencies Act. The inquiry is independent of the parliamentary review committee. By law, the inquiry was required to complete its report and submit it to Parliament by February 20, 2023. The inquiry was scheduled initially to start on September 19 and run until October 28. Due to Justice Rouleau undergoing surgery, the inquiry was delayed, and the public hearings ran from October 13 to December 2.

A government press release said it is hoped investigations would "prevent these events from happening again". Conservatives said the investigations were too focused on the actions of protesters and their fundraising, and not on justifying the use of the Emergencies Act or determining whether it was appropriate for it to have been invoked.

== Questions to be examined and assessed ==
"Public Order Emergency Commission of Inquiry into the circumstances that led to the declaration of emergency that was in place from February 14–23, 2022, and the measures taken for dealing with the emergency."

The enquiry examined and assessed whether there was a threat to Canada's security as defined under the Canadian Security Intelligence Service Act that could be deemed to be a "national emergency"—an "urgent", "critical situation". Were there serious threats to the "lives, health or safety of Canadians"? The inquiry investigated whether the "capacity or authority" of a province to deal with the urgent situation, was exceeded. It also reviewed whether Canada's sovereignty, security and territorial integrity" were "seriously threatened". A crucial question for the inquiry was whether the "national emergency" could not have been "effectively dealt with under any other law of Canada". Threats to Canada's security as defined by the Intelligence Service Act include the violent overthrow of the Canadian government, "foreign influenced activities", "espionage", "sabotage" threats of serious violence against individuals fuelled by ideology, politics, or religion. The Rouleau inquiry was not mandated to determine who was at fault or to assign liability for what happened during the Canada convoy protest in early 2022. The inquiry's role was to determine whether Prime Minister Trudeau was justified by law to invoke the Emergencies Act, which became part of his political legacy. It also determined "whether and how" the Emergencies Act could be used in the future. Conservatives had raised concerns in April, months before the Inquiry began, that investigations were too focused on the actions of protesters and their fundraising, and not on justifying the use of the Emergencies Act or determining whether it was appropriate for it to have been invoked.

== Attorneys and witnesses ==
Co-lead Commission Counsel were Shantona Chaudhury and Jeffrey Leon, and senior inquiry lawyers included Frank Au, Natalia Rodriguez, Gabriel Poliquin and Dan Sheppard. Other lawyers included Tom Curry who represented the former Ottawa police chief Peter Sloly. Paul Champ represented Ottawa citizens and businesses. Brendan Miller represented some of the protestors. David Migicovsky represented the Ottawa Police Service. The Canadian Civil Liberties Association was represented by Cara Zwibel. The Justice Centre for Constitutional Freedoms also appeared, in the persons of Keith Wilson and Eva Chipiuk who were hired to represent upwards of two dozen Freedom Convoy participants, including Tamara Lich.

Prime Minister Justin Trudeau appeared as witness on November 25. Witnesses during the hearings related to the role played by the police, included OPP retired Chief Superintendent Carson Pardy, RCMP Commissioner Brenda Lucki, CSIS head David Vigneault and the head of the Integrated Threat Assessment Centre.

== Hearings and documents ==
Public hearings began on October 13 and run until December 2, 2022. There were 31 days of testimony with 77 witnesses. About 7,000 documents were submitted to the hearings in the form of "text and email messages, cabinet documents, transcripts and witness statements".

=== Factual stage ===
During the six weeks of the inquiry's public hearings from October 13 through December 2—the factual stage of the inquiry—testimonies from about 77 witnesses were heard. This includes "protest participants, law enforcement representatives, federal cabinet ministers and officials with provincial and municipal governments". During the first week of public hearings, the focus was on documents and testimonies tracing the communication of CSIS, OPP, and OPS intelligence reports. Following Rouleau's opening statement, the parties who had been granted standing at the Commission delivered a brief opening statement. On October 14, the second day of hearings, four Ottawa residents, representatives of the Business Improvement Area (BIA), and two Ottawa city councillors provided their statements on how they and their constituents and people they represent, experienced the protests, including Victoria De La Ronde, Zexi Li, Nathalie Carrier, and Kevin McHale. De La Ronde, who described herself as having a visual impairment, said she felt "trapped and helpless."

From October 17 through October 19 other City of Ottawa representative provided their testimonies. From October 19 through October 31, representatives of the Ontario Provincial Police (OPP) and the Ottawa Police Service (OPS) were questioned including retired Chief Superintendent Carson Pardy on October 20, Pat Morris, the head of the OPP's Provincial Operations Intelligence Bureau (POIB) Superintendent, Patricia Ferguson, acting deputy chief of the Ottawa Police Service., and Peter Sloly, who was questioned on October 28 and 31. OPP Superintendent Craig Abrams testified on October 20 and October 21. He was questioned by lawyers Tom Curry, Paul Champ. Convoy lawyer Alan Honner questioned Pardy about the numbers of OPP members deployed. OPP lawyer Chris Diana questioned Ferguson about "Project Hendon" reports. (Note: The OPP's name for their investigations into "illegal activity or threats to public safety" related to the protests was Project Hendon.)

A full week from November 1 to November 5 was devoted to testimonies by protesters starting with the first person to allegedly conceive of the protests, Brigitte Belton, and then Chris Barber—who had travelled to Ottawa from Saskatchewan with Tamara Lich during the protests. Paul Champ, who represented Ottawa residents and business owners, said that Judge Rouleau had only allowed two hours for his clients' evidence in contrast to amount of time that he had allocated for Ottawa convoy protest leaders and organizers—Pat King, Benjamin Dichter, Tom Marazzo, Chris Barber, Lich, Jeremy MacKenzie. Protesters were given extra allowances to share lengthy monologues, grievances, conflicts, motivations, and to answer questions for several days. MacKenzie, described in a Globe and Mail article as the "creator" of a far-right, anti-government group, Diagolon, told the inquiry that an RCMP officer was leaking information to him during the protests.

From November 7 through November 11 officials from Windsor, Coutts, the provinces of Ontario and Alberta, provided testimonies related to protests that blocked international borders.

On November 16, Commission Counsel Jeffrey Leon announced that there would be a presentation of an overview summary of the estimated 9,500 public submissions sent in from August through October 31. The November 14 through November 18 hearings included testimonies from representatives of federal ministries and the Privy Council Office, along with the RCMP Commissioner, Brenda Lucki and RCMP Deputy Commissioners.

Testimonies from representatives of the Canadian Security Intelligence Service and the Integrated Terrorism Assessment Centre, along with Ministers Bill Blair of the Emergency Preparedness and president of the King's Privy Council, Public Safety Minister Marco Mendicino, Intergovernmental Affairs Minister Dominic LeBlanc, Justice Minister, David Lametti, National Defence Minister Anita Anand, Transport Canada Minister Omar Alghabra, Deputy Prime Minister and Finance Chrystia Freeland were heard in the final week of hearings, from November 21 through November 25. The final testimony was that of Prime Minister Justin Trudeau.

=== Policy phase ===
The policy phase of the inquiry began on November 28 with round-table discussions with experts in specific fields, such as social media, disinformation, and constitutional law to deepen Commissioner Rouleau's understanding of these issues and to suggest recommendations.

On December 2, the final day of this stage, six constitutional law experts provided testimonies.

== Final report ==
The five volumes of the Report of the Public Inquiry into the 2022 Public Order Emergency were released on February 17, 2023 three days ahead of schedule.

The first volume provides an overview and recommendations; volumes two and three include the analysis of evidence, the fourth volume explains of how the POEC worked, and volume five included commissioned papers by academic experts.

In volume one, Rouleau clarified that the Charter's "robust protection" for protests has reasonable limits".

On February 17, 2023, Justice Rouleau released his 2,000-page final report, finding that the Trudeau government met the "very high threshold" for invoking the Emergencies Act after failures by police and politicians to address the protests. Rouleau wrote that he reached his conclusion “with reluctance,” and that reasonable and informed people could come to a different conclusion. Rouleau found that the freezing of bank accounts should have included a "delisting mechanism" and that it was unjust for individuals with no connection to the protests to be affected, but called that "unavoidable". Rouleau criticized Trudeau for labelling the protesters a "fringe minority" during the protest, writing that the comments likely hardened their resolve and embittered them.

Rouleau also made various recommendations to the government to improve policing, information sharing, and amend the Act, asking the government to provide its response within a year of his report. Following the announcement, Trudeau said the government would respond within six months of the report. In August 2023, a government spokesperson said an update would be coming in "the coming days". A year after the report was released, no government response had been provided. In March 2024, Public Safety Minister Dominic LeBlanc said the government would need more time to respond, citing its appeal of a Federal Court ruling, and indicating steps could be taken at some point in the future.

== Media response ==
A 2 December 2022 Globe and Mail op-ed written by Marcus Gee said that while, in the writer's opinion, the invocation of the Act was not necessary, the inquiry itself was a win for open democracy as Canadians were given an opportunity to see how "people they elect actually do their jobs." Top government officials had to explain in detail and in public their reasons for their actions with accompanying documents available for anyone to see.

Les Whittington wrote a Hill Times op-ed on 19 October 2022 that introduced readers to the word "grifters" underneath which he wrote: "The quasi-judicial setting of the inquiry will lend legitimacy to the destructive, extremist positions of the people who engineered the convoy revolt and they will be in a position to capitalize on a wholly unwarranted credibility."

On 29 November 2022 Toronto Star contributing columnist Gillian Steward wrote that the "Convoy protest lawyers didn’t do their clients any favours".

== See also ==
- Emergencies Act
