= Thomas Percival Lancaster =

Canadian politician

Ontario MPP
- In office 1929–1934
- Preceded by: New riding
- Succeeded by: Alexander Leslie Elliott
- Constituency: Peterborough
- In office 1929–1934
- Preceded by: William Alfred Anderson
- Succeeded by: Riding abolished
- Constituency: Peterborough County

Personal details
- Born: July 18, 1877
- Died: October 10, 1968 (aged 91) Campbellford, Ontario
- Party: Conservative
- Spouse: Claire Clara Elizabeth Puffer (m. 1926)
- Occupation: Newspaper publisher

Thomas Percival Lancaster (July 18, 1877 – October 10, 1968) was a newspaper publisher and political figure in Ontario. He represented the ridings of Peterborough County and Peterborough in the Legislative Assembly of Ontario from 1929 to 1937 as a Conservative member.

Lancaster purchased the Havelock Standard in 1897 and operated it until 1939. He died in Campbellford at the age of 91.
