= Peterborough—Kawartha (provincial electoral district) =

Provincial electoral district in Ontario, Canada

Coordinates: 44.462°N 78.185°W

Ontario electoral district
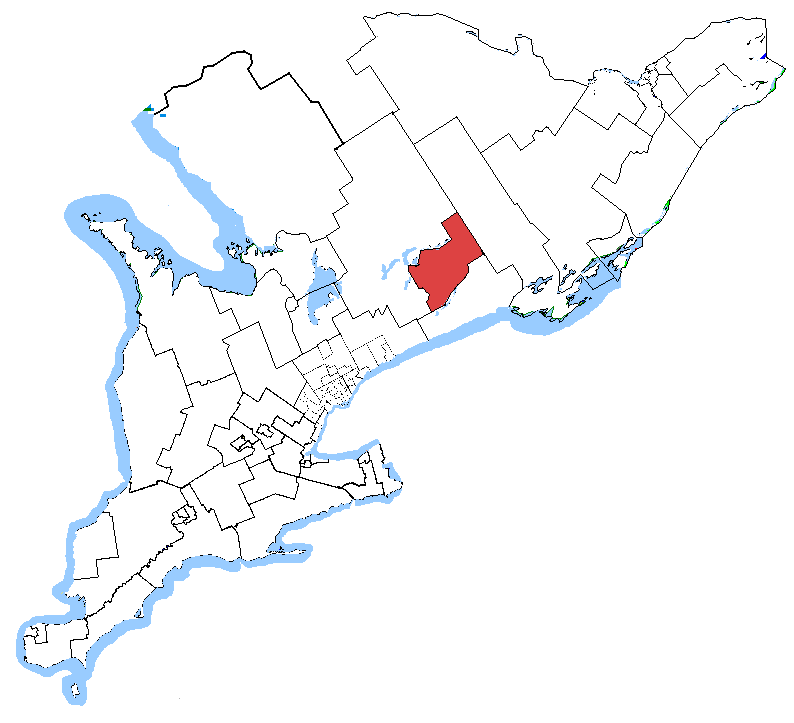
- Peterborough—Kawartha in relation to southern Ontario ridings

Provincial electoral district
- Legislature: Legislative Assembly of Ontario
MPP
Dave Smith
Progressive Conservative
- First contested: 1934
- Last contested: 2025

Demographics
- Population (2016): 118,175
- Electors (2018): 98,070
- Area (km²): 3,339
- Pop. density (per km²): 35.4
- Census division: Peterborough County
- Census subdivision(s): Peterborough, Selwyn, Douro-Dummer, Otonabee–South Monaghan, Havelock-Belmont-Methuen, Asphodel-Norwood

Peterborough—Kawartha (formerly Peterborough) is a provincial electoral district in Ontario, Canada, that has been represented in the Legislative Assembly of Ontario since 1934. It now consists of the city of Peterborough and the municipalities of Douro-Dummer, Trent Lakes, Havelock-Belmont-Methuen, North Kawartha, and Selwyn plus the Curve Lake First Nation. Before 2018, it consisted of the County of Peterborough, excluding the townships of North Kawartha, Galway-Cavendish and Harvey and Cavan-Millbrook-North Monaghan.

The riding is considered a bellwether riding as it has voted for the party that has won the most seats in every election since 1977.

As part of the 2015 electoral redistribution, the district was renamed Peterborough—Kawartha. It lost the townships of Otonabee-South Monaghan, Asphodel-Norwood, and the Hiawatha First Nation, while subsequently gaining the townships of Trent Lakes and North Kawartha. The 2018 election was the first with the new boundaries.

== Members of Provincial Parliament ==
Peterborough
Assembly	Years	Member	Party
Peterborough City and Peterborough County ridings merged to form Peterborough
19th	1934–1937	Thomas Percival Lancaster	Conservative
20th	1937–1943	Alexander Leslie Elliott	Liberal
21st	1943–1945	Harold Robinson Scott	Progressive Conservative
22nd	1945–1948	Harold Robinson Scott	Progressive Conservative
23rd	1948–1951	Harold Robinson Scott	Progressive Conservative
24th	1951–1955	Harold Robinson Scott	Progressive Conservative
25th	1955–1959	Harold Robinson Scott	Progressive Conservative
26th	1959–1963	Keith Brown	Progressive Conservative
27th	1963–1967	Keith Brown	Progressive Conservative
28th	1967–1971	Walter Pitman	New Democratic
29th	1971–1975	John Melville Turner	Progressive Conservative
30th	1975–1977	Gillian Sandeman	New Democratic
31st	1977–1981	John Melville Turner	Progressive Conservative
32nd	1981–1985	John Melville Turner	Progressive Conservative
33rd	1985–1987	John Melville Turner	Progressive Conservative
34th	1987–1990	Peter Adams	Liberal
35th	1990–1995	Jenny Carter	New Democratic
36th	1995–1999	Gary Stewart	Progressive Conservative
37th	1999–2003	Gary Stewart	Progressive Conservative
38th	2003–2007	Jeff Leal	Liberal
39th	2007–2011	Jeff Leal	Liberal
40th	2011–2014	Jeff Leal	Liberal
41st	2014–2018	Jeff Leal	Liberal
Peterborough—Kawartha
42nd	2018–2022	Dave Smith	Progressive Conservative
43rd	2022–2025	Dave Smith	Progressive Conservative
44th	2025–present	Dave Smith	Progressive Conservative

== Election results ==
=== Peterborough—Kawartha (2018–Present) ===
Winning party in each polling division of Peterborough—Kawartha at the 2025 Ontario general election

2025 Ontario general election
Party	Candidate	Votes	%	±%	Expenditures
Progressive Conservative	Dave Smith	22,417	40.68	+2.10	$59,649
Liberal	Adam Hopkins	20,217	36.69	+6.14	$46,928
New Democratic	Jen Deck	9,290	16.86	–4.52	$58,562
Green	Lucas Graham	1,745	3.17	–0.49	$0
New Blue	Andrew Roudny	859	1.56	–0.52	$65
Ontario Party	Brian Martindale	581	1.05	–2.71	$0
Total valid votes/expense limit		55,109	99.59	–	$170,734
Total rejected, unmarked and declined ballots		227	0.41	+0.02	
Turnout		55,336	52.18	+0.72	
Eligible voters		106,046			
Progressive Conservative hold		Swing		–2.02	
Source: Elections Ontario

Winning party in each polling division of Peterborough—Kawartha at the 2022 Ontario general election

2022 Ontario general election
Party	Candidate	Votes	%	±%
Progressive Conservative	Dave Smith	20,205	38.58	+0.90
Liberal	Greg Dempsey	15,998	30.55	+5.96
New Democratic	Jen Deck	11,196	21.38	–12.37
Ontario Party	Tom Marazzo	1,972	3.77	–
Green	Robert Gibson	1,914	3.65	+0.33
New Blue	Rebecca Quinnell	1,088	2.08	–
Total valid votes		52,373	99.61	
Total rejected, unmarked and declined ballots		206	0.39	–0.82
Turnout		52,579	51.47	–11.28
Eligible voters		102,163		
Progressive Conservative hold		Swing		–2.53
Source: Elections Ontario

2018 Ontario general election
Party	Candidate	Votes	%	±%
Progressive Conservative	Dave Smith	22,904	37.68	+6.96
New Democratic	Sean Conway	20,518	33.75	+15.65
Liberal	Jeff Leal	14,946	24.59	–21.12
Green	Gianne Broughton	2,024	3.33	–0.96
Libertarian	Jacob William Currier	245	0.40	–
Stop Climate Change	Ken Ranney	153	0.25	–
Total valid votes		60,790	98.79	
Total rejected, unmarked and declined ballots		744	1.21	
Turnout		61,534	62.75	
Eligible voters		98,070		
Progressive Conservative notional hold		Swing		–4.35
Source: Elections Ontario

2014 general election redistributed results
Party	Vote	%
Liberal	24,413	45.71
Progressive Conservative	16,407	30.72
New Democratic	9,666	18.10
Green	2,292	4.29
Others	635	1.19

=== Peterborough—Kawartha (1934–2018) ===
2014 Ontario general election: Peterborough
Party	Candidate	Votes	%	±%
Liberal	Jeff Leal	24,709	46.33	+6.40
Progressive Conservative	Scott Stewart	15,907	29.83	–1.66
New Democratic	Sheila Wood	9,728	18.24	–7.37
Green	Gary Beamish	2,287	4.29	+1.75
Independent	Brian Martindale	395	0.74	–
Socialist	Andrea Quiano	132	0.25	+0.08
Freedom	Wayne Matheson	121	0.23	–0.03
Pauper	Gerard Faux	52	0.10	–
Total valid votes		53,331	98.85	
Total rejected, unmarked and declined ballots		622	1.15	+0.70
Turnout		53,953	57.30	+4.11
Eligible voters		94,167		
Liberal hold		Swing		+4.03
Source: Elections Ontario

2011 Ontario general election: Peterborough
Party	Candidate	Votes	%	±%
Liberal	Jeff Leal	19,430	39.93	–7.79
Progressive Conservative	Alan Wilson	15,323	31.49	+5.79
New Democratic	Dave Nickle	12,460	25.61	+8.98
Green	Gary Beamish	1,235	2.54	–6.19
Freedom	Alex Long	127	0.26	–
Socialist	Kenneth Ranney	83	0.17	–
Total valid votes		48,658	99.55	
Total rejected, unmarked and declined ballots		219	0.45	–0.02
Turnout		48,877	53.18	–4.29
Eligible voters		91,908		
Liberal hold		Swing		–6.79
Source: Elections Ontario

2007 Ontario general election: Peterborough
Party	Candidate	Votes	%	±%	Expenditures
Liberal	Jeff Leal	24,466	47.72	+2.97	$95,432
Progressive Conservative	Bruce Fitzpatrick	13,176	25.70	–7.77	$89,425
New Democratic	Dave Nickle	8,523	16.62	–1.18	$33,229
Green	Miriam Stucky	4,473	8.72	+5.81	$10,163
Family Coalition	Paul Morgan	634	1.24	+0.48	$0
Total valid votes		51,272	99.53		
Total rejected, unmarked and declined ballots		241	0.47	+0.02	
Turnout		51,513	57.47	–5.29	
Eligible voters		89,627			
Liberal hold		Swing		+5.37	
Source: Elections Ontario

2003 Ontario general election: Peterborough
Party	Candidate	Votes	%	±%	Expenditures
Liberal	Jeff Leal	24,626	44.74	+4.55	$59,358
Progressive Conservative	Gary Stewart	18,418	33.46	–11.53	$83,317
New Democratic	Dave Nickle	9,796	17.80	+4.80	$22,783
Green	Tim Holland	1,605	2.92	+1.81	$6,817
Family Coalition	Max Murray	414	0.75	–	$212
Independent	Bob Bowers	178	0.32	+0.05	not listed
Total valid votes		55,037	99.56		
Total rejected, unmarked and declined ballots		245	0.44	–0.10	
Turnout		55,282	62.76	–0.00	
Eligible voters		88,080			
Liberal gain from Progressive Conservative		Swing		+8.04	
Source: Elections Ontario

1999 Ontario general election: Peterborough
Party	Candidate	Votes	%	±%	Expenditures
Progressive Conservative	Gary Stewart	24,422	44.99	–7.67	$66,248
Liberal	Jeff Leal	21,820	40.20	+16.28	$45,608
New Democratic	Dave Nickle	7,058	13.00	–4.56	$26,105
Green	Larry J. Tyldsley	598	1.10	–	$1,651
Independent	Bob Bowers	151	0.28	–	$862
Independent	Kenneth Thomas Burgess	125	0.23	–	not listed
Natural Law	Robert Mayer	106	0.20	–0.30	$0
Total valid votes		54,280	99.46		
Total rejected, unmarked and declined ballots		297	0.54	–0.21	
Turnout		54,577	62.77	–3.46	
Eligible voters		86,951			
Progressive Conservative hold		Swing		–11.98	
Source: Elections Ontario

1995 Ontario general election: Peterborough
Party	Candidate	Votes	%	±%	Expenditures
Progressive Conservative	Gary Stewart	22,735	52.66	+31.45	$45,102
Liberal	Sylvia Sutherland	10,326	23.92	–8.61	$42,101
New Democratic	Jenny Carter	7,581	17.56	–15.42	$26,275
Family Coalition	Paul Morgan	2,064	4.78	–3.94	$12,225
Libertarian	Vic Watts	251	0.58	–	$1,047
Natural Law	Peter Leggat	213	0.49	–	$0
Total valid votes		43,170	99.24		
Total rejected, unmarked and declined ballots		329	0.76	+0.05	
Turnout		43,499	66.23	–0.42	
Eligible voters		65,678			
Progressive Conservative gain from New Democratic		Swing		+23.44	
Source: Elections Ontario

1990 Ontario general election: Peterborough
Party	Candidate	Votes	%	±%
New Democratic	Jenny Carter	13,813	32.98	+4.69
Liberal	Peter Adams	13,628	32.53	–7.60
Progressive Conservative	Doris K. Brick	8,884	21.21	–1.33
Family Coalition	John Harrington	3,652	8.72	+0.59
Confederation of Regions	Dean Wasson	1,586	3.79	–
Green	Paul G. Cleveland	325	0.78	–
Total valid votes		41,888	99.29	
Total rejected, unmarked and declined ballots		300	0.71	+0.35
Turnout		42,188	66.65	+2.96
Eligible voters		63,300		
New Democratic gain from Liberal		Swing		+6.14
Source: Elections Ontario

1987 Ontario general election: Peterborough
Party	Candidate	Votes	%	±%	Expenditures
Liberal	Peter Adams	15,098	40.13	+15.32	$41,229
New Democratic	Linda Slavin	10,641	28.29	–2.16	$33,162
Progressive Conservative	Doris K. Brick	8,480	22.54	–20.49	$30,135
Family Coalition	Alex Calder	3,057	8.13	–	$5,128
Libertarian	John Conlin	344	0.91	–0.26	$2,055
Total valid votes		37,620	99.63		
Total rejected ballots		138	0.37	–0.13	
Turnout		37,758	63.69	+3.50	
Eligible voters		59,288			
Liberal gain from Progressive Conservative		Swing		+17.91	
Source: Elections Ontario

1985 Ontario general election: Peterborough
Party	Candidate	Votes	%	±%
Progressive Conservative	John Melville Turner	16,878	43.03	–2.90
New Democratic	Linda Slavin	11,941	30.44	+8.06
Liberal	Bill Ayotte	9,734	24.82	–3.98
Libertarian	John Conlin	461	1.18	–0.84
Green	George K. Kerr	212	0.54	–
Total valid votes		39,226	99.51	
Total rejected ballots		194	0.49	+0.12
Turnout		39,420	60.19	–2.80
Eligible voters		65,493		
Progressive Conservative hold		Swing		–5.48
Source: Elections Ontario

1981 Ontario general election: Peterborough
Party	Candidate	Votes	%	±%	Expenditures
Progressive Conservative	John Melville Turner	17,962	45.92	+5.26	$37,481
Liberal	Peter Adams	11,263	28.80	+4.57	$24,430
New Democratic	Paul Rexe	8,756	22.39	–11.91	$21,400
Libertarian	John Scott Hayes	787	2.01	+1.19	$3,667
Independent	Bruce Knapp	286	0.73	–	$936
Independent	Kenneth Thomas Burgess	59	0.15	–	$0
Total valid votes		39,113	99.63		
Total rejected ballots		147	0.37	+0.08	
Turnout		39,260	62.99	–7.88	
Eligible voters		62,332			
Progressive Conservative hold		Swing		+0.35	
Source: Elections Ontario

1977 Ontario general election: Peterborough
Party	Candidate	Votes	%	±%
Progressive Conservative	John Melville Turner	16,923	40.66	+2.36
New Democratic	Gillian Sandeman	14,275	34.30	–5.23
Liberal	Peter Adams	10,083	24.23	+2.25
Libertarian	John A. Hayes	341	0.82	–
Total valid votes		41,622	99.71	
Total rejected ballots		121	0.29	+0.01
Turnout		41,743	70.87	–0.31
Eligible voters		58,901		
Progressive Conservative gain from New Democratic		Swing		+3.80
Source: Elections Ontario

1975 Ontario general election: Peterborough
Party	Candidate	Votes	%	±%
New Democratic	Gillian Sandeman	16,154	39.53	–1.81
Progressive Conservative	John Melville Turner	15,649	38.29	–4.40
Liberal	Mike O'Toole	8,979	21.97	+6.00
Communist	Gerry Van Houten	83	0.20	–
Total valid votes		40,865	99.72	
Total rejected ballots		115	0.28	–0.00
Turnout		40,980	71.18	–6.50
Eligible voters		57,575		
New Democratic gain from Progressive Conservative		Swing		+1.29
Source: Elections Ontario

1971 Ontario general election: Peterborough
Party	Candidate	Votes	%	±%
Progressive Conservative	John Melville Turner	18,632	42.69	+5.46
New Democratic	Walter Pitman	18,042	41.34	–4.00
Liberal	David J. Hobson	6,970	15.97	–1.45
Total valid votes		43,644	99.72	
Total rejected ballots		124	0.28	–0.25
Turnout		43,768	77.67	+3.03
Eligible voters		56,350		
Progressive Conservative gain from New Democratic		Swing		+4.73
Source: Elections Ontario

1967 Ontario general election: Peterborough
Party	Candidate	Votes	%	±%
New Democratic	Walter Pitman	15,432	45.34	+29.99
Progressive Conservative	Sam Murphy	12,673	37.24	–20.81
Liberal	Ed Redmond	5,930	17.42	–9.17
Total valid votes		34,035	99.46	
Total rejected ballots		184	0.54	+0.02
Turnout		34,219	74.64	+6.79
Eligible voters		45,847		
New Democratic gain from Progressive Conservative		Swing		+19.58
Source: Elections Ontario

1963 Ontario general election: Peterborough
Party	Candidate	Votes	%	±%
Progressive Conservative	Keith Brown	16,972	58.05	–0.13
Liberal	Jack McCarney	7,777	26.60	–6.58
New Democratic	Michael Sutton	4,490	15.36	+7.73
Total valid votes		29,239	99.48	
Total rejected ballots		153	0.52	–0.26
Turnout		29,392	67.85	+9.62
Eligible voters		43,321		
Progressive Conservative hold		Swing		+3.23
Source: Elections Ontario

1959 Ontario general election: Peterborough
Party	Candidate	Votes	%	±%
Progressive Conservative	Keith Brown	13,984	58.17	+6.54
Liberal	Joseph Slattery	7,975	33.18	–2.15
Co-operative Commonwealth	Edmund S. Humphrey	1,834	7.63	–5.41
Social Credit	Martin Graves	246	1.02	–
Total valid votes		24,039	99.22	
Total rejected ballots		190	0.78	–0.11
Turnout		24,229	58.23	–0.74
Eligible voters		41,609		
Progressive Conservative hold		Swing		+4.34
Source: Elections Ontario

1955 Ontario general election: Peterborough
Party	Candidate	Votes	%	±%
Progressive Conservative	Harold Scott	11,561	51.63	–6.84
Liberal	Arthur B. Burrows	7,909	35.32	+4.39
Co-operative Commonwealth	E. S. Humphrey	2,920	13.04	+2.46
Total valid votes		22,390	99.10	
Total rejected ballots		203	0.90	+0.25
Turnout		22,593	58.97	–8.18
Eligible voters		38,311		
Progressive Conservative hold		Swing		–5.62
Source: Elections Ontario

1951 Ontario general election: Peterborough
Party	Candidate	Votes	%	±%
Progressive Conservative	Harold Scott	14,442	58.48	+15.59
Liberal	Frances P. Burke	7,640	30.94	–1.39
Co-operative Commonwealth	William C. Grant	2,614	10.58	–14.20
Total valid votes		24,696	99.35	
Total rejected ballots		162	0.65	–0.01
Turnout		24,858	67.15	–5.94
Eligible voters		37,017		
Progressive Conservative hold		Swing		+8.49
Source: Elections Ontario

1948 Ontario general election: Peterborough
Party	Candidate	Votes	%	±%
Progressive Conservative	Harold Scott	10,257	42.89	–8.05
Liberal	Charles H. Elliott	7,729	32.32	+0.62
Co-operative Commonwealth	John George Morton	5,927	24.79	+7.43
Total valid votes		23,913	99.34	
Total rejected ballots		160	0.66	+0.05
Turnout		24,073	73.09	–7.62
Eligible voters		32,935		
Progressive Conservative hold		Swing		–4.34
Source: Elections Ontario

1945 Ontario general election: Peterborough
Party	Candidate	Votes	%	±%
Progressive Conservative	Harold Scott	12,398	50.94	+12.12
Liberal	William W. Dawson	7,714	31.70	–2.62
Co-operative Commonwealth	William C. Grant	4,225	17.36	–9.50
Total valid votes		24,337	99.38	
Total rejected ballots		151	0.62	+0.21
Turnout		24,488	80.71	+19.07
Eligible voters		30,341		
Progressive Conservative hold		Swing		+7.37
Source: Elections Ontario

1943 Ontario general election: Peterborough
Party	Candidate	Votes	%	±%
Progressive Conservative	Harold Scott	6,884	38.82	–4.45
Liberal	Alexander Leslie Elliott	6,084	34.31	–13.99
Co-operative Commonwealth	Bruce Johnston	4,763	26.86	+18.44
Total valid votes		17,731	99.60	
Total rejected ballots		72	0.40	–0.33
Turnout		17,803	61.64	–18.54
Eligible voters		28,882		
Progressive Conservative gain from Liberal		Swing		+4.77
Source: Elections Ontario

1937 Ontario general election: Peterborough
Party	Candidate	Votes	%	±%
Liberal	Alexander Leslie Elliott	10,603	48.30	+3.82
Conservative	Thomas Percival Lancaster	9,501	43.28	–1.37
Co-operative Commonwealth	William Stanley Johnson	1,849	8.42	–2.45
Total valid votes		21,953	99.26	
Total rejected ballots		163	0.74	–0.04
Turnout		22,116	80.18	+3.82
Eligible voters		27,583		
Liberal gain from Conservative		Swing		+2.59
Source: Elections Ontario

1934 Ontario general election: Peterborough
Party	Candidate	Votes	%
Conservative	Thomas Percival Lancaster	9,394	44.64
Liberal	James Hawthorne	9,360	44.48
Co-operative Commonwealth	John B. Sutherland	2,288	10.87
Total valid votes		21,042	99.22
Total rejected ballots		165	0.78
Turnout		21,207	76.36
Eligible voters		27,774	
Conservative pickup new district.			
Source: Elections Ontario

== 2007 electoral reform referendum ==
2007 Ontario electoral reform referendum
Side	Votes	%
First Past the Post	32,372	64.5
Mixed member proportional	17,834	35.5
Total valid votes	50,206	100.0

== See also ==
- List of Ontario provincial electoral districts
- Canadian provincial electoral districts
