= Brendan Miller =

Canadian lawyer

Brendan Myers Miller, K.C. is a Canadian criminal and civil litigation lawyer based in Calgary.

== Career ==
In 2013, Miller successfully argued the United Nations Convention on the Rights of Persons with Disabilities in order to keep his client, convicted of sexual assault, out of jail, though this later overturned by the Appeal Court, and substituted with a sentence of 90 days in jail to be served on weekends, plus one year of probation. In 2013 and 2014 he was part of the legal team representing Heather Wilson Duncan who was acquitted of second degree murder in shooting death of her husband, but convicted of manslaughter and receiving a four-year sentence.

In 2017, Miller constitutionally challenged on behalf of a client the inability for persons accused with securities fraud to have a jury trial, and argued the same before the Supreme Court of Canada.

In 2018, Miller was counsel to Ric McIver in a dispute with the Alberta Conflicts of Interest Commissioner, regarding whether the Commissioner's report and decision was subject to judicial review. The Court ruled that the Commissioner's report and decision were subject to parliamentary privilege, and therefore immune from review by the Courts. Also in 2018, Daniel Colborne and Miller were successful in challenging the prohibition of common law unmarried couples in dividing their pensions upon separation in Alberta, with the Court finding the legislation violated equality rights in s.15 of the Canadian Charter of Rights and Freedoms.

In 2021 Miller acted for former NHL star, Theo Fleury, in a dispute over the ownership of the rights to Fleury's life story. That same year, Miller lead a coalition of Canadian lawyers seeking the prosecutor of International Criminal Court, Karim Khan, open a preliminary investigation on the Government of Canada and the Vatican for crimes against humanity over their involvement in the mass grave site discovered in Kamloops. Khan declined the request, on the basis that the crime had not occurred on or after July 1, 2002. Miller and other lawyers maintained that the federal government and the Vatican suppressed their alleged crimes beyond 2002, amounting to a continuing offence. Khan didn't address the argument in their rejection.

In Spring 2022, Miller defended former Alberta Minister of Justice, Jonathan Denis, in contempt proceedings. On appeal, Professor Peter Sankoff K.C. as lead appeal counsel, and Miller, acted for Denis where the Alberta Court of Appeal quashed the conviction for contempt.

In Fall 2022, Miller represented some of the Canada convoy protestors at the Public Order Emergency Commission. His application at the commission to have a man testify that an Enterprise Canada employee was identified as the man carrying a Nazi flag at the Ottawa protests in a sworn affidavit filed with the commission, and Miller's cross-examinations, caused Politico to label Miller as the "Biggest Firebrand of 2022". Justice Paul Rouleau who ran the commission described the claim as having "little foundation in evidence." Miller was later removed from the commission after arguing with and talking over Justice Rouleau regarding redacted records, outstanding motions, and calling of witnesses, but was let back in that day. Eventually by the end of the commission, Miller succeeded in forcing the government of Canada to resubmit unredacted copies of 20 documents to the inquiry.

Enterprise Canada, "a national strategic communications firm", launched a legal claim for damages in the Ontario Superior Court of Justice on December 20, 2022, stating that Miller's claims that their employee took the Nazi flag to the protest were false. Enterprise Canada previously served a defamation notice on Miller in November 2022. On March 31, 2023, Enterprise stated that they and Miller had resolved the legal case. Miller refused to apologize or retract the allegation.

In Fall of 2023 Miller acted for the Blood Tribe at the Supreme Court of Canada regarding a large treaty land claim. Miller had earlier acted for the Blood Tribe on the trial of the matter, where the Federal Court of Canada found that the Government of Canada deprived the Blood Tribe of more than 160 square miles of reserve land in breach of Treaty 7 and s.35 of the Constitution. The Federal Court of Appeal overturned the trial decision on the sole basis of a limitation period defence that the Government of Canada lost at trial, and in February 2023 the Supreme Court of Canada granted leave to appeal the case. Miller argued the case before the Supreme Court of Canada on October 12, 2023. The Supreme Court of Canada was critical of the federal government's position as the federal government lawyer acknowledged at the hearing that Ottawa had acted "dishonourably" in breach of Treaty 7; the Court reserved their decision. In April 2024 the Supreme Court of Canada granted the appeal in part and issued a declaration that Canada breached Treaty 7.

In May 2024 Miller acted for a home owner who the City of Calgary issued a stop order to under a bylaw so as to stop group sex parties occurring in his home, as the home was not designated as a social club. The Court ruled that the home owner could continue with such parties, but had to follow guidelines set out by the Court so as not to constitute a social club.

On August 27, 2024 the Government of Alberta appointed Miller to the Alberta Law Enforcement Review Board.

In 2026 Miller was made King’s Counsel.
