= Peter Adams (politician) =

Canadian politician (1936–2018)

The Honourable Peter Adams PC OOnt

Member of the Canadian Parliament for Peterborough
- In office 1993–2006
- Preceded by: Bill Domm
- Succeeded by: Dean Del Mastro

Ontario MPP
- In office 1987–1990
- Preceded by: John Melville Turner
- Succeeded by: Jenny Carter
- Constituency: Peterborough

Personal details
- Born: 17 April 1936 Ellesmere Port, England, United Kingdom
- Died: 28 September 2018 (aged 82) Peterborough, Ontario, Canada
- Party: Liberal
- Other political affiliations: Ontario Liberal Party
- Spouse: Jill
- Children: Joanne, Michèle, Annette, Will
- Profession: Politician, Professor

William Peter Adams, PC, OOnt (17 April 1936 – 28 September 2018), commonly known as Peter Adams, was a Canadian politician from Ontario. He was a Liberal member of Canada's House of Commons from 1993 to 2006 representing the riding of Peterborough. Previously, Adams represented the provincial riding of Peterborough in the Legislative Assembly of Ontario from 1987 to 1990, sitting as a member of the Ontario Liberal Party.

== Background ==
Adams was born in Ellesmere Port, United Kingdom and educated at the University of Sheffield and McGill University. He served as director of the subarctic research laboratory in Schefferville, Quebec, and was a member of the Geography department and coordinator of Northern Studies at Trent University in Peterborough, where he was later Emeritus Professor. Adams also served as Vice President – Academic while at Trent. Adams has authored many books and articles, and co-edited the regional history Peterborough and the Kawarthas. In 1981, he was named as Peterborough's Citizen of the Year.

== Provincial politics ==
In 1977, Adams ran as the Liberal candidate in the 1977 provincial election, but finished third against Progressive Conservative John Turner and incumbent New Democrat Gill Sandeman. He ran again in the 1981 provincial election, and finished second against Turner.

Adams ran for the seat again in the 1987 provincial election, and won by a comfortable majority amid a landslide provincial victory for the Liberal Party. He served as a backbench supporter of David Peterson and was appointed as parliamentary assistant to Minister of the Environment Jim Bradley from 1989 to 1990.

The Liberals were defeated by the New Democratic Party in the 1990 provincial election, and Adams lost his seat to NDP candidate Jenny Carter by 185 votes.

== Federal politics ==
Adams was elected to the Canadian House of Commons in the federal election of 1993, defeating Progressive Conservative incumbent Bill Domm by almost 16,000 votes. He was re-elected in the elections of 1997, 2000, and 2004, each time by a comfortable margin.

He was for many years a prominent supporter of Jean Chrétien, opposing Paul Martin's bid to succeed Chrétien as party leader. Adams was appointed by Martin as Parliamentary Secretary to the Minister of Human Resources and Skills Development and Minister responsible for Democratic Renewal on 20 July 2004. He did not stand for re-election in the 2006 federal election.

In 2012 he was made a member of the Order of Ontario.

== Electoral record (partial) ==
2004 Canadian federal election: Peterborough
Party	Candidate	Votes	%	±%	Expenditures
Liberal	Peter Adams	25,099	43.55	–	$82,907
Conservative	James Jackson	18,393	31.92		$51,318
New Democratic	Linda Slavin	10,957	19.01		$33,309
Green	Brent Wood	3,182	5.52		$4,730
Total valid votes/expense limit		57,631	100.00	–	$83,531
Total rejected ballots		192	0.33	0.00	
Turnout		57,823	65.19	4.42	
Electors on the lists		88,695			
Percentage change figures are factored for redistribution. Conservative Party percentages are contrasted with the combined Canadian Alliance and Progressive Conservative percentages from 2000.
Sources: Official Results, Elections Canada and Financial Returns, Elections Canada.

2000 Canadian federal election: Peterborough
Party	Candidate	Votes	%	±%	Expenditures
Liberal	Peter Adams	25,310	48.41	–	$55,442
Alliance	Eric John Allan Mann	14,924	28.54		$61,961
Progressive Conservative	Darrin Langen	7,034	13.45		$22,256
New Democratic	Herb Wiseman	3,967	7.59		$20,021
Green	Tim Holland	903	1.73		$1,738
Independent	Bob Bowers	147	0.28		$1,097
Total valid votes/expense limit		52,285	100.00		
Total rejected ballots		175	0.33		
Turnout		52,460	60.77		
Electors on the lists		86,319			
Sources: Official Results, Elections Canada and Financial Returns, Elections Canada.

1997 Canadian federal election: Peterborough
Party	Candidate	Votes	%	±%
Liberal	Peter Adams	25,594	46.5	-1.0
Reform	Nancy Branscombe	15,759	28.7	+5.4
Progressive Conservative	Tom McMillan	8,757	15.9	-4.1
New Democratic	Fred Birket	4,874	8.9	+3.6
Total valid votes		54,984	100.0	

1993 Canadian federal election: Peterborough
Party	Candidate	Votes	%	±%
Liberal	Peter Adams	27,575	47.6	+17.3
Reform	Len Bangma	13,460	23.2	
Progressive Conservative	Bill Domm	11,628	20.1	-20.8
New Democratic	Merv Richards	3,072	5.3	-22.2
National	Herb Wiseman	1,858	3.2	
Natural Law	Sandy Callender	368	0.6	
Total valid votes		57,961	100.0	

1987 Ontario general election: Peterborough
Party	Candidate	Votes	%	±%	Expenditures
Liberal	Peter Adams	15,098	40.13	–	$41,229
New Democratic	Linda Slavin	10,641	28.29		$33,162
Progressive Conservative	Doris Brick	8,480	22.54		$30,135
Family Coalition	Alex Calder	3,057	8.13	–	$5,128
Libertarian	John Conlin	344	0.91		$2,055
Total valid votes		37,620	100.00		

1981 Ontario general election: Peterborough
Party	Candidate	Votes	%	Expenditures
Progressive Conservative	John Turner	17,962	45.92	$37,481
Liberal	Peter Adams	11,263	28.80	$24,430
New Democratic	Paul Rexe	8,756	22.39	$21,400
Libertarian	John Hayes	787	2.01	$3,667
Independent	Bruce Knapp	286	0.73	$936
Independent	Kenneth T. Burgess	59	0.15	$0
Total valid votes		39,113	100.00	
Rejected, unmarked and declined ballots		191		
Turnout		39,304	63.06	
Electors on the lists		62,332		
