= William Alfred Anderson =

Canadian politician from Ontario

Member of the Ontario Provincial Parliament for Peterborough County
- In office December 1, 1926 – September 17, 1929
- Preceded by: Thomas Dalton Johnston
- Succeeded by: Thomas Percival Lancaster

Personal details
- Party: Liberal

William Alfred Anderson was a Canadian politician from the Ontario Liberal Party. He represented Peterborough County in the Legislative Assembly of Ontario from 1926 to 1929.

== See also ==
- 17th Parliament of Ontario
