= Tom Marazzo =

Canadian military veteran and protest leader

Tom Marazzo is a Canadian military veteran, former teacher, and leader in the 2022 Canadian convoy protest.

== Career ==
Joining in September 1998 in Hamilton, Ontario and working until 2016, Marazzo worked for the Canadian Armed Forces as a military officer. Marazzo reached the rank of captain and worked as a construction engineer. He left the regular forces in 2015, moving to the supplemental reserves. He was never deployed internationally.

Marazzo taught computer software at Georgian College from 2019 until 2021 when he was fired after questioning his the college's COVID-19 vaccine policy.

Marazzo was the Peterborough—Kawartha candidate for the Ontario Party in the 2022 Ontario general election. He alleged that Peterborough mayor Diane Therrien pressured Peterborough police into charging the owners of burger restaurant Peterburgers under city noise bylaws. Marazzo won 1,972 votes, representing 3.77% of the votes cast, losing to Dave Smith of the Progressive Conservative Party.

== Activism ==
Marazzo was a spokesperson and a leader in the Canada convoy protest, and he helped lead logistics and keep emergency routes on roads open.

During a press conference at the Canada convoy protest, Marazzo suggested that protest organisers could collaborate with the federal opposition parties: the New Democratic Party, the Conservative Party of Canada, and the Bloc Québécois to form a coalition against the government.

On 17 June 2022, fellow protest leader Tamara Lich was arrested for breaching bail conditions that forbade her from meeting Marazzo.

Marazzo is a leader of the Veterans 4 Freedom group.

=== Emergency Act inquiry ===
While being questioned at the public enquiry into the Canadian government use of the Emergencies Act, Marazzo stated that the protest group Diagolon is only an internet meme and not real.

== Personal life ==
Marazzo previously lived in Barrie, Ontario but moved away after losing his job at Georgian College.

== Electoral history ==
2022 Ontario general election: Peterborough—Kawartha
Party	Candidate	Votes	%	±%
Progressive Conservative	Dave Smith	20,205	38.58	+0.90
Liberal	Greg Dempsey	15,998	30.55	+5.96
New Democratic	Jen Deck	11,196	21.38	−12.37
Ontario Party	Tom Marazzo	1,972	3.77	
Green	Robert Gibson	1,914	3.65	+0.33
New Blue	Rebecca Quinnell	1,088	2.08	
Total valid votes		52,373	100.0	
Total rejected, unmarked, and declined ballots		206		
Turnout		52,579	51.47	
Eligible voters		103,171		
Progressive Conservative hold		Swing		−2.53
Source(s): "Summary of Valid Votes Cast for Each Candidate" (PDF). Elections Ontario. 2022. Archived from the original on May 18, 2023.; "Statistical Summary by Electoral District" (PDF). Elections Ontario. 2022. Archived from the original on May 21, 2023.

== See also ==
- Pat King
- Christopher John Barber
- James Bauder
