= Harold Scott (politician) =

Canadian politician

Harold R. Scott

MPP for Peterborough
- In office August 4, 1943 – June 10, 1959
- Preceded by: Alexander Leslie Elliott
- Succeeded by: Keith Brown

Personal details
- Born: October 14, 1894 Shawbridge, Quebec
- Died: October 9, 1961 (aged 66) Mississauga Lake, Ontario
- Party: Ontario Progressive Conservative Party
- Spouse: Lucy Ellen Gray
- Occupation: lumberman

Harold Robinson Scott (October 14, 1894 – October 9, 1961) was a Canadian politician who was a Member of Provincial Parliament in Legislative Assembly of Ontario from 1943 to 1959. He represented the riding of Peterborough for the Ontario Progressive Conservative Party. He was born in Shawbridge, Quebec and was a lumberman. He died in 1961.
