= Keith Brown (Ontario politician) =

Canadian politician

Ontario MPP
- In office 1959–1967
- Preceded by: Harold Scott
- Succeeded by: Walter Pitman
- Constituency: Peterborough

Personal details
- Born: November 7, 1926; Bonarlaw, Ontario
- Died: July 7, 2015 (aged 88); Peterborough, Ontario
- Political party: Progressive Conservative
- Spouse: Marjorie
- Children: 3
- Occupation: Businessman

Keith Roy Brown (November 7, 1926 – July 7, 2015) was a politician in Ontario, Canada. He was a Progressive Conservative Party member of the Legislative Assembly of Ontario from 1959 to 1967 representing the riding of Peterborough.

== Background ==
Brown was born in Bonarlaw, Ontario. He was a member of the United Church of Canada and a freemason. He has owned several businesses in Peterborough, including a car dealership and a property development company. He and his wife Marjorie raised three daughters.

== Politics ==
Brown was elected to the Ontario legislature in the 1959 general election, winning by a significant margin in Peterborough. He was re-elected in 1963. He did not run in 1967 citing business pressure. The Progressive Conservatives held a majority government in the legislature throughout this period, and Brown served as a backbench supporter of the Leslie Frost and John Robarts administrations.

Brown served as Chairman of the Committee of the Whole House (i.e., Deputy Speaker) for a period in the 1960s. On one occasion, he was the target of a motion of non-confidence by the opposition. He was later the campaign manager for Sam Murphy in the 1967 election. Murphy was defeated by New Democratic Party candidate Walter Pitman.

During the 1967 election, a controversy arose over property that Brown had purchased for $85,000 in 1964 and sold for $210,000 in early 1967. The Ontario Housing Corporation (OHC) expressed interest in the land shortly thereafter, and some reports suggested the possibility of an improper relationship between Brown, the subsequent landowners, and the OHC. Brown dismissed this, saying that he was uninvolved in the OHC proposal and that in light of later developments his selling price had been too low. Trade and Development Minister Stanley Randall later confirmed that Brown had not been involved in the OHC's discussions and described the accusations against him as "wholly unreasonable and completely unwarranted."

== Later life ==
Brown's automobile firm gave financial support to Chris Stockwell in his bid to succeed Mike Harris as leader of the Progressive Conservative Party of Ontario in the party's 2002 leadership election. His son-in-law, Daryl Bennett, was elected as the mayor of Peterborough in 2010; Brown was in attendance for the campaign launch.

He spent nearly 60 years with his wife, Marjorie, before she died in 2005. Brown died in Peterborough, Ontario on July 7, 2015.

== Electoral record ==
1959 Ontario general election: Peterborough
Party	Candidate	Votes	%
Progressive Conservative	Keith Brown	13,984	58.17
Liberal	Joseph Slattery	7,975	33.18
Co-operative Commonwealth	Edmund Humphrey	1,834	7.63
Social Credit	Martin Graves	246	1.02
Total valid votes		24,039	

1963 Ontario general election: Peterborough
Party	Candidate	Votes	%	±%
Progressive Conservative	Keith Brown	16,972	58.05	
Liberal	Jack McCarney	7,777	26.60	
New Democratic	Mildred Sutton	4,490	15.36	
Total valid votes		29,239	100.00	
