= Thomas Dalton Johnston =

Canadian politician from Ontario

Member of the Ontario Provincial Parliament for Peterborough East
- In office June 25, 1923 – October 18, 1926
- Preceded by: Ernest Nicholls McDonald
- Succeeded by: William Alfred Anderson

Personal details
- Party: Conservative

Thomas Dalton Johnston was a Canadian politician from the Conservative Party of Ontario. He represented Peterborough East in the Legislative Assembly of Ontario from 1923 to 1926.

== See also ==
- 16th Parliament of Ontario
