= James Thompson (Canadian politician) =

Canadian politician from Ontario

Member of the Ontario Provincial Parliament for Peterborough East
- In office June 8, 1908 – September 23, 1919
- Preceded by: William A. Anderson
- Succeeded by: Ernest Nicholls McDonald

Personal details
- Party: Conservative

James Thompson was a Canadian politician from Ontario. He represented Peterborough East in the Legislative Assembly of Ontario from 1908 to 1919.

== See also ==
- 12th Parliament of Ontario
- 13th Parliament of Ontario
- 14th Parliament of Ontario
