= John Melville Turner =

Canadian politician

John Turner

Ontario MPP
- In office 1977–1987
- Preceded by: Gillian Sandeman
- Succeeded by: Peter Adams
- In office 1971–1975
- Preceded by: Walter Pitman
- Succeeded by: Gillian Sandeman
- Constituency: Peterborough

Personal details
- Born: September 24, 1922 Peterborough, Ontario
- Died: January 20, 2013 (aged 90) Peterborough, Ontario
- Party: Progressive Conservative

John Melville Turner (born September 24, 1922 – January 20, 2013) was a Canadian politician in the province of Ontario. He served in the Legislative Assembly of Ontario from 1971 to 1975, and again from 1977 to 1987, as a member of the Progressive Conservative Party. He was the Speaker of the Ontario Legislature from 1981 to 1985.

== Background ==
Turner was born and educated in Peterborough, Ontario. He served in the Royal Canadian Air Force as a Pilot Officer from 1942 to 1945, and later worked as a business manager. He was an alderman for Peterborough, Ontario City Council from 1969 to 1971, and also served on the city health board. On March 31, 2014, Jeff Leal, Peterborough MPP and Minister of Rural Affairs announced that 55 km of Highway 115 from Peterborough to the 401 MacDonald-Cartier Freeway was dedicated as the John M. Turner Memorial Highway in honour of Turner's service to his country, province and community. Turner was a member of St. Paul's Presbyterian Church, and a member of the Peterborough Rotary Club.

== Politics ==
In 1971, Turner was elected to the Ontario legislature in the provincial election, defeating New Democratic Party incumbent Walter Pitman by 590 votes in the Peterborough constituency. He served as a backbench supporter of Bill Davis's government for the next four years, and lost to NDP candidate Gillian Sandeman by 505 votes in the 1975 election.

Turner defeated Sandeman by 2,648 votes in the 1977 election. He defeated Liberal Party candidate Peter Adams by 6,699 votes in the 1981 election. He was appointed as Speaker of the Legislature on April 21, 1981.

The Progressive Conservatives were reduced to a tenuous minority government under Frank Miller's leadership in the 1985 provincial election. Turner was re-elected in Peterborough, but was replaced as Speaker by Liberal Hugh Edighoffer when the Tories lost control of the legislature after the election. Turner served as an opposition member for the next two years, and did not seek re-election in 1987.

== Electoral record ==
1981 Ontario general election: Peterborough
| Party | Candidate | Votes | % | Expenditures |
|---|---|---|---|---|
| Progressive Conservative | John Turner | 17,962 | 45.92 | $37,481 |
| Liberal | Peter Adams | 11,263 | 28.80 | $24,430 |
| New Democratic | Paul Rexe | 8,756 | 22.39 | $21,400 |
| Libertarian | John Hayes | 787 | 2.01 | $3,667 |
| Independent | Bruce Knapp | 286 | 0.73 | $936 |
| Independent | Kenneth T. Burgess | 59 | 0.15 | $0 |
| Total valid votes | | 39,113 | 100.00 | |
| Rejected, unmarked and declined ballots | | 191 | | |
| Turnout | | 39,304 | 63.06 | |
| Electors on the lists | | 62,332 | | |

1985 Ontario general election: Peterborough
| Party | Candidate | Votes | % | ±% |
|---|---|---|---|---|
| Progressive Conservative | John Melville Turner | 16,878 | 43.03 | |
| New Democratic | Linda Slavin | 11,941 | 30.44 | |
| Liberal | Bill Ayotte | 9,734 | 24.82 | |
| Libertarian | John Conlin | 461 | 1.18 | |
| Green | George Kerr | 212 | 0.54 | – |
| Total valid votes | | 39,226 | 100.00 | |
| Rejected, unmarked, and declined ballots | | 233 | | |
| Turnout | | 39,459 | 60.25 | |
| Electors on the lists | | 65,493 | | |
