= Pat King (activist) =

Canadian activist

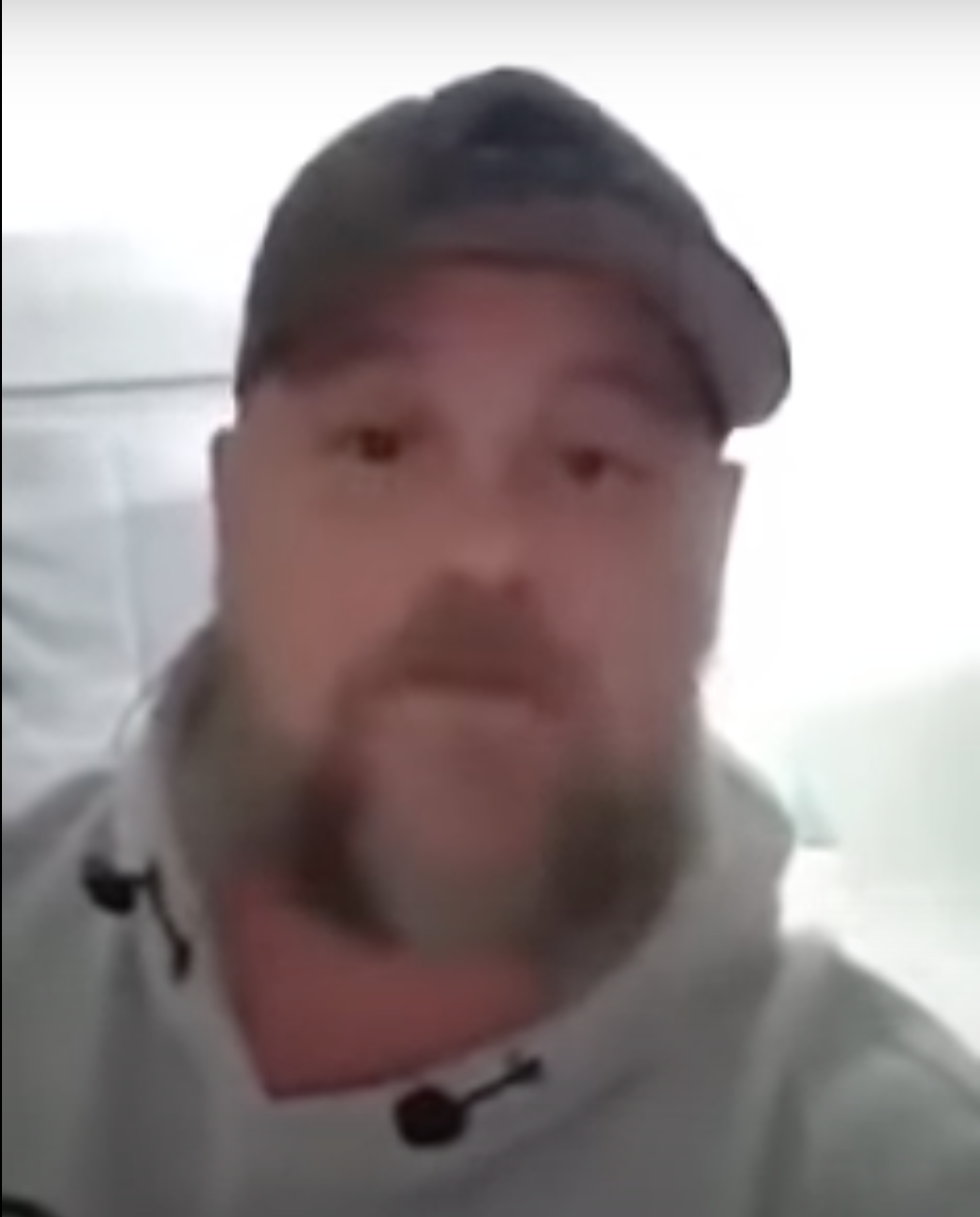
- Born: Patrick James King; August 2, 1977 (age 49); Sault Ste. Marie, Ontario
- Citizenship: Canadian
- Organization: United We Roll (campaign)
- Known for: White-nationalism, conspiracy theories, anti-COVID-19 lockdown activism, Holocaust denial

Patrick James King (born August 2, 1977) is a Canadian far-right activist, known for protesting COVID-19 mandates. He has led the Wexit movement advocating for secession from Canada of Alberta and other western provinces, led the United We Roll movement, and acted as a regional organizer for the Canada convoy protest.

King was arrested on February 18, 2022, at the convoy protests in Ottawa and was convicted on five charges including mischief and disobeying a court order. He was released on bail on July 18, 2022 and was subsequently sentenced to 3 months plus time served.

== Activism and demonstration ==
Prior to being ordered by the courts to stop, King was highly active on social media. His Facebook profile had 341,000 followers in July 2023.

=== Western Canada secessionism ===
In 2019, King was an organizer of the Wexit movement that advocated for Canada's prairie provinces to secede.

=== United We Roll ===
King was a co-organizer and a driver for the United We Roll yellow vest protest in 2019 and spoke of the importance of a gas pipeline and of the employment benefits of the oil and gas industry. He also spoke of the national benefit of the Albertan economy and the lack of support to Albertans in 2019. King later stated that the Canadian Broadcasting Corporation distorted the messages of the movement.

=== Alberta anti-racist counter protest ===
King was part of a right-wing counter protest to an anti-racist demonstration in Red Deer in 2020 where he was noted for saying: "That's patriots kicking antifa out of their towns!"

In September 2020, he organized a second counter-protest in Ponoka and threatened violence against anti-racist protests whom he characterized as Antifa.

=== COVID-19 pandemic in Canada ===
In August 2021, King and Chris Sky visited Moose Jaw, Saskatchewan, and spoke as part of a No-Vaxx Pass tour, in which they encouraged Canadians to defy the rules about vaccine passports. Also in August, King incorrectly claimed that his actions led to easing of COVID-19 public health measures in Alberta. His misunderstanding was a result of his misreading court documents rejecting his appeal against a parking ticket. This led to the Justice Centre for Constitutional Freedoms stating that: "It is unclear whether Mr. King fully understands the legal process he is involved in."

In October 2021, King broadcast a video, falsely claiming that the Canadian military had set up a base at Black Lake Denesuline First Nation and were forcing COVID-19 vaccinations on women and children. The video went viral, resulting in pressure upon the Athabasca Health Authority and the Federation of Sovereign Indigenous Nations to put out statements, correcting the misinformation.

In November 2021, King claimed in a social media message that there was no evidence that COVID-19 exists. In December, King said of the public health measures: "The only way this is going to be solved is with bullets."

==== 2021 federal election ====
King has accused Canadian Prime Minister Justin Trudeau of stealing the 2021 Canadian federal election and in the lead up to the Canada convoy protest advised his social media followers to stock up on food and supplies as preparation for "what's coming".

==== Canada convoy protest ====
King was a regional organizer and one of the highest profile promoters of the 2022 Canada convoy protest in Ottawa. Responding to a question about the impact of noise on Ottawa residents, King expressed amusement. In the lead up to the Ottawa protest, MP Jeremy Patzer stated that he had no association with King after meeting him as the protest convoy passed through Swift Current.

King suggested that someone was going to make Prime Minister Justin Trudeau "catch a bullet" one day.

==== Criminal trial history ====
King was arrested on February 18, 2022, during the convoy protests as part of a police operation aimed at peacefully ending the occupation. He broadcast the arrest via his Facebook page. He was charged with mischief, counselling to commit mischief, perjury, obstruction of justice, counselling to disobey a court order, and counselling to obstruct police. He was held in the Ottawa-Carleton Detention Centre.

King was denied bail after a justice of the peace determined that there was a substantive likelihood of King reoffending given his criminal history and the overwhelming case presented by the Crown. His lawyer had argued for bail due to the risk that King could catch COVID-19 in jail while awaiting trial. This prompted the judge to address the irony of the situation: "an individual whose raison d'etre is to protest vehemently against public health measures designed to reduce the spread of COVID, would now suggest that the delay or the potential for being infected at a detention centre could impact the court's decision."

On March 24, 2022, an additional four charges were laid against King, who is now co-accused with Tyson George Billings, bringing the new total to ten charges: two counts of obstructing police, two counts of intimidation, one count of counselling intimidation, one count of disobeying a court order, counselling to commit mischief, mischief, counselling to disobey a court order, and counselling to obstruct police.

King was granted bail on July 18, 2022, and forbidden from using social media, contacting convoy leaders, or organizing convoy-related protests. King's trial was initially scheduled for November 27, 2023. A request to relocate the trial away from Ottawa was initially rejected by Superior Court justice Kevin Phillip in April 2023. Phillip set aside that ruling in June after a decision by the Supreme Court of Canada, two days after his decision, altered the standard by which justices may deny applications. In July 2023, King was permitted by the courts to restart using social media to fundraise for his legal costs, which had reached $170,000. In August 2023, King ordered back into custody for alleged bail violations for a week before being released with stricter restrictions.

In November 2023, King's trial date was moved to May 2024. The Crown's arguments focused on King's leadership of the protests and heavily cited his social media posts. King's defence denied this, argued that police had stopped the protestors from leaving, and that King had urged for peace and cooperation. The parties concluded their closing arguments on July 26, 2024, with a decision expected in October.

On November 22, 2024, King was convicted of five charges of mischief, counselling to commit mischief, and disobeying a court order. King was acquitted of three charges of intimidation, counselling to commit intimidation, and obstructing a public or peace officer. In February 2025, King was issued a three month conditional sentence to be served under house arrest. King was given nine months' credit for time already served in jail and under restrictive bail conditions. The sentence included 100 hours of community service and one year of probation. In March 2025, the Crown said that it would be appealing the sentence.

== Views and conspiracy theories ==
King has a history of anti-Muslim, white nationalist, and far-right conspiracy theories. He has shared videos online promoting the white genocide conspiracy theory, including saying on social media, "There's an endgame: It's called depopulation of the Caucasian race."

King accused the government of Canada of permitting Islamic State terrorists to enter Canada as refugees, of "normalizing pedophilia", and of adopting an immigration policy to "depopulate the white, Anglo-Saxon race". He has advocated against a carbon tax, arguing that it puts Canadians at an economic disadvantage.

King has said that the only way to end Canadian public health measures against COVID-19 may be achieved "with bullets". King also commented that Justin Trudeau was going to catch a bullet.

In 2021, he claimed that the Holocaust death toll of 6 million was overstated.

== Personal life ==
King was born in Sault Ste. Marie, Ontario. King lives in Innisfail, Alberta, near Red Deer.

King has claimed to have Métis heritage and has claimed to be affiliated with Garden River First Nation and to have family connections to the Thessalon First Nation. Garden River Chief Andy Rickar has contested this claim, stating that King has "no ties to Garden River". Furthermore, the local Métis community maintains that he does not meet the criteria for membership in the Métis Nation of Ontario.

== See also ==
- Tamara Lich
- Christopher John Barber
- Tom Marazzo
- Chris Sky
- COVID-19 pandemic in Canada
- COVID-19 protests in Canada
