= Ernest Nicholls McDonald =

Canadian politician from Ontario

Member of the Ontario Provincial Parliament for Peterborough East
- In office October 20, 1919 – May 10, 1923
- Preceded by: James Thompson
- Succeeded by: Thomas Dalton Johnston

Personal details
- Party: United Farmers

Ernest Nicholls McDonald was a Canadian politician from Ontario. He represented Peterborough East in the Legislative Assembly of Ontario from 1919 to 1923.

== See also ==
- 15th Parliament of Ontario
