= John C. O'Sullivan =

Canadian politician

Ontario MPP
- In office 1875–1879
- Preceded by: George Read
- Succeeded by: Thomas Blezard
- Constituency: Peterborough East

Personal details
- Born: 1843 Northumberland County, Canada West
- Died: 1887 (aged 43–44)
- Political party: Conservative
- Spouse: Margaret Flanagan (m. 1871)

John C. O'Sullivan (1843–1887) was a physician and politician in Ontario, Canada. He represented Peterborough East in the Legislative Assembly of Ontario from 1875 to 1879 as a Conservative.

He was born in Northumberland County, Canada West, of Irish descent, and was educated at Victoria University and Queen's University. In 1871, O'Sullivan married Margaret Flanagan. His election in 1875 was appealed but he won the by-election that followed later that year. In 1885, he was named president of the Irish National League branch in Peterborough.

== Electoral history ==
1875 Ontario general election: Peterborough East
Party	Candidate	Votes	%	±%
Conservative	John C. O'Sullivan	759	52.13	−9.55
Liberal	James Stratton	697	47.87	+9.87
Total valid votes		1,456	67.47	+6.92
Eligible voters		2,158		
Election voided
Source: Elections Ontario

Ontario provincial by-election, September 1875: Peterborough East Previous election voided
Party	Candidate	Votes	%	±%
Conservative	John C. O'Sullivan	722	50.60	−11.08
Independent	J. Hogan	365	25.58	
Independent	W. Sargent	340	23.83	
Total valid votes		1,427		
Conservative hold		Swing		−11.08
Source: History of the Electoral Districts, Legislatures and Ministries of the Province of Ontario
