= Yellow vests movement (Canada) =

2018 social movement in Canada

The yellow vests movement was a series of Canadian protests, inspired by France's yellow vest (gilets jaunes) protests, that occurred in late 2018 and early 2019. Unlike the French gilets jaunes protests in 2018 and 2019, the Yellow Vest Canada movement incorporated xenophobic rhetoric in their messaging, and have been described as "frontline extremists, hate group, alt-right, and far right.

== Goals and messaging ==
According to the Yellow Vest Canada Facebook page in December 2018, "This group is to protest the CARBON TAX and the Treason of our country's politicians who have the audacity to sell out OUR country's sovereignty over to the Globalist UN and their Tyrannical policies." "We are also against the government attempting to buy off the media in an election year and conspire with social media companies to censor our speech. We CANNOT have a free and democratic society unless WE HAVE FREE SPEECH and the ability to express it as far and wide as we wish...We are Canadian Patriots who refuse to allow this country to walk down the path of Tyranny."

Among the first Yellow Vest protests in Canada were those in Western Canada's oil-producing provinces. On December 15, hundreds of protesters gathered in Calgary, Alberta, where the headquarters of the oil industry are situated. Protesters expressed frustration at municipal, provincial, and national governments. They protested against the April 2019 carbon price and against Prime Minister Justin Trudeau. By mid-January 2019, there were about 100,000 members in their Facebook group, "Yellow Vest Canada", according to the Canadian Press. Global News reported that the Yellow Vest protests in Canada were largely driven by social media, particularly Facebook, and that they were against Prime Minister Justin Trudeau and the endorsement of the United Nations Global Compact for Safe, Orderly and Regular Migration (GCM).

The gilets jaunes movement did not include the Canadian Yellow Vest movements anti-immigration anger, visible in its messaging. On December 15, hundreds of yellow vest protesters encountered counter-protesters, some of whom also wore high-visibility vests at the Alberta Legislature Building and Edmonton City Hall. Some protesters held pro-pipeline or anti-illegal immigration signs while counter-protesters accused them of racism.

On February 14, 2019, the Canadian Anti-Hate Network (CAHN) said that the Canadian Yellow Vests Facebook early messaging changed. Original Facebook members complained and "were swiftly ostracized and banned". In a 2019 article, CAHN said that this was in line with a tactic of the far-right to rebrand by adding "more grievances" as a way of attracting and recruiting new members. In their promotion of the January 19 protest in Medicine Hat, their organizer, Tamara Lich, clarified that they wanted a peaceful protest and that the Medicine Hat Police Service (MHPS) had communicated their support to her. Lich said that the "scuffles" at the Calgary and Edmonton protests with counter-protesters had not occurred in Medicine Hat. She expressed concerns about the posts in the week of January 8 on Yellow-Vest Canada's Facebook and Twitter pages that included death threats against Prime Minister Trudeau. She said the Yellow Vest Medicine Hat group had debated changing their name to "Canadian Initiatives, Medicine Hat YV".

In December 2018, CBC News reported that Yellow Vests Canada did not have the same goals as the French movement. In a January 2019 Canadian Press interview, Canada's ambassador to France, Isabelle Hudon, also said that the Canadian movement bore little resemblance to the original gilets jaunes protests in France. They attracted much smaller crowds than those in France.

== Organizers ==
Alberta resident Tamara Lich, who was arrested in February 2022 for her alleged involvement as one of the key figures involved with the Canada convoy protest in Ottawa, was listed as an early organizer of the Yellow vests protests in her home town of Medicine Hat in 2018 and 2019. She was also one of the early leaders in the Wexit separatist movement, from which the Wildrose Independence Party of Alberta was formed.

=== United We Roll ===
By January 2019, United We Roll organizers were concerned that the presence of the controversial Yellow Vesters at their protests in Alberta, would result in their pro-pipeline message being overpowered. Early on United We Roll had formally separated from the Yellow Vests movement. However, by the time the truck convoy left Red Deer for Ottawa on February 14, there were many yellow vest protesters who had joined them. United We Roll organizer, Jason Corbeil, said that their organization considered itself to be a "big tent group" that welcomed those with different causes so they could not exclude the Yellow Vest protesters. United We Roll were a pro-oil industry movement calling for the construction of pipelines and protesting against the carbon tax. They were also critical of federal legislation that sought to change energy projects' environmental review process and legislation to ban oil tankers off the north coast of British Columbia. When the convoy arrived in Ottawa on February 19, their demonstrations lasted two days and included speeches from Conservative Party of Canada leader Andrew Scheer and Faith Goldy. Hundreds of the controversial Yellow Vest protesters arrived on Parliament Hill in Canada's capital city, Ottawa, to support the United We Roll truck convoy.

In Saskatchewan, protests included a 427-truck pro-pipeline convoy in Estevan, 70 people in Yorkton, and 200 people in Regina.

== See also ==
- Canada convoy protest
- Yellow vests protests (France)
