= George Read (Ontario politician) =

Canadian politician

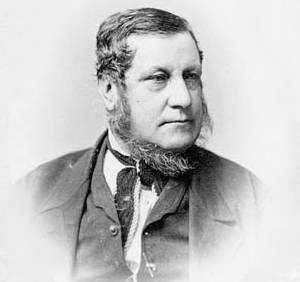

Ontario MPP
- In office 1867–1874
- Preceded by: Riding established
- Succeeded by: John C. O'Sullivan
- Constituency: Peterborough East

Personal details
- Born: August 13, 1819 Augusta Township, Upper Canada
- Died: March 29, 1903 (aged 83) Otonabee Township, Ontario
- Party: Conservative
- Occupation: Businessman

George Read (August 13, 1819 – March 29, 1903) was an Ontario businessman and political figure. He represented Peterborough East in the Legislative Assembly of Ontario as a Conservative member from 1867 to 1874.

He was born in Augusta Township in Upper Canada in 1819, the great grandson of United Empire Loyalists who settled in Grenville County. He served as clerk and treasurer for Otonabee Township. He died there in 1903.

== Electoral history ==
1867 Ontario general election: Peterborough East
Party	Candidate	Votes	%
Conservative	George Read	996	62.52
Liberal	E. Ingram	597	37.48
Total valid votes		1,593	80.82
Eligible voters		1,971	
Conservative pickup new district.			
Source: Elections Ontario

1871 Ontario general election: Peterborough East
Party	Candidate	Votes	%	±%
Conservative	George Read	779	61.68	−0.84
Liberal	Mr. O'Donohoe	480	38.00	+0.53
Independent	Mr. Pearce	4	0.32	
Turnout		1,263	60.55	−20.27
Eligible voters		2,086		
Conservative hold		Swing		−0.69
Source: Elections Ontario
