= Dave Smith (Peterborough, Ontario politician) =

Canadian politician

Dave Smith MPP
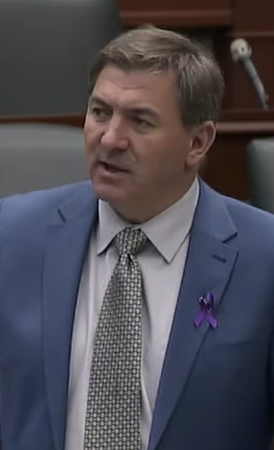

Parliamentary Assistant to the Minister of Finance
- Incumbent
- Assumed office July 15, 2024
- Minister: Peter Bethlenfalvy

Member of the Ontario Provincial Parliament for Peterborough—Kawartha
- Incumbent
- Assumed office June 7, 2018
- Preceded by: Jeff Leal

Personal details
- Born: February 24, 1970 (age 56) Belleville, Ontario
- Party: Progressive Conservative Party of Ontario
- Spouse: Lorien Smith
- Children: 3
- Occupation: Manager of Product Development

Dave Smith MPP is a Canadian politician, who was elected to the Legislative Assembly of Ontario in the 2018 provincial election and re elected in the 2022 and 2025 provincial elections. He represents the riding of Peterborough—Kawartha as a member of the Progressive Conservative Party of Ontario.

== Background ==
Smith was born in Belleville and raised in Wellington, Bowmanville and Picton. He attended Bowmanville High School and Prince Edward Collegiate Institute has a Bachelor of Science degree in Computing Systems from Trent University and a Master of Business Administration from the University of Fredericton (2018). He is currently enrolled in a Ph.D in taxation policy from Trent University. Prior to entering politics, Smith worked as the Manager of Product Development for Cardinal Software and was the lead developer of the company's products for Co-operative education, Ontario Youth Apprenticeship and Specialist High Skill Major. He was the project manager for the development of Cardinal Software's Individual Education Plan software. Prior to moving to the Cardinal Software in 2006, Smith worked in the ICT Department of Kawartha Pine Ridge District School Board.

== Electoral record ==
2022 Ontario general election: Peterborough—Kawartha
Party	Candidate	Votes	%	±%
Progressive Conservative	Dave Smith	20,205	38.58	+0.90
Liberal	Greg Dempsey	15,998	30.55	+5.96
New Democratic	Jen Deck	11,196	21.38	−12.37
Ontario Party	Tom Marazzo	1,972	3.77	
Green	Robert Gibson	1,914	3.65	+0.33
New Blue	Rebecca Quinnell	1,088	2.08	
Total valid votes		52,373	100.0	
Total rejected, unmarked, and declined ballots		206		
Turnout		52,579	51.47	
Eligible voters		103,171		
Progressive Conservative hold		Swing		−2.53
Source(s): "Summary of Valid Votes Cast for Each Candidate" (PDF). Elections Ontario. 2022. Archived from the original on 2023-05-18.; "Statistical Summary by Electoral District" (PDF). Elections Ontario. 2022. Archived from the original on 2023-05-21.

2018 Ontario general election: Peterborough—Kawartha
Party	Candidate	Votes	%	±%
Progressive Conservative	Dave Smith	22,904	37.68	+6.96
New Democratic	Sean Conway	20,518	33.75	+15.65
Liberal	Jeff Leal	14,946	24.59	–21.12
Green	Gianne Broughton	2,024	3.33	–0.96
Libertarian	Jacob William Currier	245	0.40	N/A
Stop Climate Change	Ken Ranney	153	0.25	N/A
Total valid votes		60,790	100.0	
Progressive Conservative notional gain from Liberal		Swing		–4.35
Source: Elections Ontario

== Politics ==
On October 22, 2018, Smith introduced a Private Members Bill named The Terrorist Sanctions Act (Bill 46). The Bill amends a number of Acts to provide for sanctions for any person convicted of a terrorist offence under any of sections 83.18 to 83.221 of the Criminal Code (Canada). The child of a parent who is convicted of a terrorist offence is considered in need of protection under Part V of the Child, Youth and Family Services Act, 2017. As well, a person who is convicted of a terrorist offence is not eligible for any of the following:

1. A Licence under the Fish and Wildlife Conservation Act, 1997.
2. Health insurance benefits under the Health Insurance Act.
3. A driver's licence under the Highway Traffic Act.
4. Rent-geared-to-income assistance or special needs housing under the Housing Services Act, 2011.
5. Grants, awards or loans under the Ministry of Training, Colleges and Universities Act.
6. Income support or employment supports under the Ontario Disability Support Program Act, 1997.
7. Assistance under the Ontario Works Act, 1997.
8. Coverage under the insurance plan under the Workplace Safety and Insurance Act, 1997.

The bill passed second reading on November 15, 2018

Smith introduced a second Private Members Bill (Bill 53) entitled Special Hockey Day Act 2018. The Bill proclaims March 27, 2019, as Special Hockey Day to coincide with the start of the 25th annual Special Hockey International tournament in Toronto. After first reading of this Bill it was reintroduced as schedule 39 in the Fall Economic Statement and received Royal Assent on December 6, 2018.

In addition, Smith has introduced and passed a third Private Members Bill (Bill 31) entitled Murray Whetung Community Service Award Act, 2023. This bill highlights the importance of demonstrating exceptional citizenship and volunteerism within communities and their corps through administering an award. Each year a cadet in each local Royal Canadian Air Cadet Corps, Royal Canadian Army Cadet Corps and Royal Canadian Sea Cadet Corps will be chosen for their display of exceptionalism. This award speaks to veteran Murray Whetung's outstanding service to his community after returning from overseas.

On March 25, 2024, Bill 31 The Murray Whetung Community Service Award Act was brought forward for 3rd reading. Smith spoke to the bill again and the desire to have it pass to honour First Nation Veterans. PC Members Lorne Coe, Brian Saunderson, Anthony Leardi, Deepak Anand and Todd McCarthy as well as and NDP members Sandy Shaw and Guy Bourgoin and independent Liberal Karen McCrimmon all spoke in favour of the bill. The bill passed on voice with no opposition.
