= Peterborough East (provincial electoral district) =

Former provincial electoral district in Ontario, Canada

Ontario electoral district

Defunct provincial electoral district
- Legislature: Legislative Assembly of Ontario
- District created: 1867
- District abolished: 1933
- First contested: 1867
- Last contested: 1929

Peterborough East was an electoral riding in Ontario, Canada. It was created in 1867 at the time of confederation and was abolished in 1926. In 1926, Peterborough East and Peterborough West were redistributed into two ridings Peterborough City and Peterborough County. This lasted until 1934 when both ridings were merged into one riding called Peterborough.

== Members of Provincial Parliament ==
Peterborough East
Assembly	Years	Member	Party
1st	1867–1871	George Read	Conservative
2nd	1871–1874	George Read	Conservative
3rd	1875–1879	John C. O'Sullivan	Conservative
4th	1879–1883	Thomas Blezard	Liberal
5th	1883–1886	Thomas Blezard	Liberal
6th	1886–1890	Thomas Blezard	Liberal
7th	1890–1894	Thomas Blezard	Liberal
8th	1894–1898	Thomas Blezard	Liberal
9th	1898–1902	Thomas Blezard	Liberal
10th	1902–1904	William A. Anderson	Liberal
11th	1905–1908	William A. Anderson	Liberal
12th	1908–1911	James Thompson	Conservative
13th	1911–1914	James Thompson	Conservative
14th	1914–1919	James Thompson	Conservative
15th	1919–1923	Ernest Nicholls McDonald	United Farmers
16th	1923–1926	Thomas Dalton Johnston	Conservative
Peterborough County
17th	1926–1929	William Alfred Anderson	Liberal
18th	1929–1934	Thomas Percival Lancaster	Conservative
Sourced from the Ontario Legislative Assembly
Merged into Peterborough before the 1934 election

== Election results ==
=== Peterborough County (1926–1934) ===
1929 Ontario general election: Peterborough County
Party	Candidate	Votes	%	±%
Conservative	Thomas Percival Lancaster	3,117	50.23	+4.80
Liberal	William Alfred Anderson	3,088	49.77	–4.80
Total valid votes		6,205	99.65	
Total rejected ballots		22	0.35	–0.25
Turnout		6,227	70.71	+3.36
Eligible voters		8,807		
Conservative gain from Liberal		Swing		+4.80
Source: Elections Ontario

1926 Ontario general election: Peterborough County
Party	Candidate	Votes	%	±%
Liberal	William Alfred Anderson	3,261	54.57	–
Conservative	Thomas Dalton Johnston	2,715	45.43	–6.93
Total valid votes		5,976	99.40	
Total rejected ballots		36	0.60	–
Turnout		6,012	67.35	–
Eligible voters		8,927		
Liberal gain from Conservative		Swing		–
Source: Elections Ontario

=== Peterborough East (1867–1926) ===
1923 Ontario general election
Party	Candidate	Votes	%	±%
Conservative	Thomas Dalton Johnston	2,550	52.35	+10.53
United Farmers	Ernest Nicholls McDonald	2,321	47.65	–10.53
Total valid votes		4,871	99.51	
Total rejected ballots		24	0.49	–2.01
Turnout		4,895	–	–
Eligible voters				
Conservative gain from United Farmers		Swing		+10.53
Source: Elections Ontario

1919 Ontario general election
Party	Candidate	Votes	%	±%
United Farmers	Ernest Nicholls McDonald	3,623	58.18	–
Conservative	James Thompson	2,604	41.82	–15.94
Total valid votes		6,227	97.49	
Total rejected ballots		160	2.51	+2.28
Turnout		6,387	67.85	–13.55
Eligible voters		9,414		
United Farmers gain from Conservative		Swing		–
Source: Elections Ontario

1914 Ontario general election
Party	Candidate	Votes	%	±%
Conservative	James Thompson	1,783	57.76	+0.86
Liberal	William A. Anderson	1,304	42.24	+3.47
Total valid votes		3,087	99.77	
Total rejected ballots		7	0.23	+0.05
Turnout		3,094	81.40	+19.42
Eligible voters		3,801		
Conservative hold		Swing		–1.30
Source: Elections Ontario

1911 Ontario general election
Party	Candidate	Votes	%	±%
Conservative	James Thompson	1,579	56.90	–4.24
Liberal	Edward Hawthorne	1,076	38.77	–0.08
Independent	David Andrews	120	4.32	–
Total valid votes		2,775	99.82	
Total rejected ballots		5	0.18	–0.37
Turnout		2,780	61.98	–17.01
Eligible voters		4,485		
Conservative hold		Swing		–2.08
Source: Elections Ontario

1908 Ontario general election
Party	Candidate	Votes	%	±%
Conservative	James Thompson	1,978	61.14	+13.39
Liberal	Patrick McNulty	1,257	38.86	–13.39
Total valid votes		3,235	99.45	
Total rejected ballots		18	0.55	+0.55
Turnout		3,253	78.99	+14.19
Eligible voters		4,118		
Conservative gain from Liberal		Swing		+13.39
Source: Elections Ontario

1905 Ontario general election
Party	Candidate	Votes	%	±%
Liberal	William A. Anderson	1,371	52.25	–3.75
Conservative	H. A. Moore	1,253	47.75	+3.75
Total valid votes		2,624	100.00	
Total rejected ballots		–		
Turnout		2,624	64.81	–11.26
Eligible voters		4,049		
Liberal hold		Swing		–3.75
Source: Elections Ontario

1902 Ontario general election
Party	Candidate	Votes	%	±%
Liberal	William A. Anderson	2,067	56.00	+2.75
Conservative	S. P. Ford	1,624	44.00	–2.75
Total valid votes		3,691	99.95	
Total rejected ballots		2	0.05	–0.22
Turnout		3,693	76.07	+5.51
Eligible voters		4,855		
Liberal hold		Swing		+2.75
Source: Elections Ontario

1898 Ontario general election
Party	Candidate	Votes	%	±%
Liberal	Thomas Blezard	1,771	53.25	–5.13
Conservative	S. P. Ford	1,555	46.75	+5.13
Total valid votes		3,326	99.73	
Total rejected ballots		9	0.27	–0.02
Turnout		3,335	70.55	+8.12
Eligible voters		4,727		
Liberal hold		Swing		–5.13
Source: Elections Ontario

1894 Ontario general election
Party	Candidate	Votes	%	±%
Liberal	Thomas Blezard	1,621	58.37	+6.94
Conservative	John Lancaster	1,156	41.63	–
Total valid votes		2,777	99.71	
Total rejected ballots		8	0.29	–0.07
Turnout		2,785	62.43	–7.97
Eligible voters		4,461		
Liberal hold		Swing		+3.47
Source: Elections Ontario

1890 Ontario general election
Party	Candidate	Votes	%	±%
Liberal	Thomas Blezard	1,421	51.43	–4.72
Conservative Equal Rights	R. R. Kidd	1,342	48.57	–
Total valid votes		2,763	99.64	
Total rejected ballots		10	0.36	+0.01
Turnout		2,773	70.40	+2.91
Eligible voters		3,939		
Liberal hold		Swing		–2.36
Source: Elections Ontario

1886 Ontario general election
Party	Candidate	Votes	%	±%
Liberal	Thomas Blezard	1,438	56.15	–2.96
Conservative	W. Stephenson	1,098	42.87	+1.99
Independent	D. McLeod	25	0.98	–
Total valid votes		2,561	99.65	
Total rejected ballots		9	0.35	–0.16
Turnout		2,570	67.49	–3.55
Eligible voters		3,808		
Liberal hold		Swing		–2.47
Source: Elections Ontario

1883 Ontario general election
Party	Candidate	Votes	%	±%
Liberal	Thomas Blezard	1,265	59.11	+5.90
Conservative	George Read	875	40.89	–5.90
Total valid votes		2,140	99.49	
Total rejected ballots		11	0.51	+0.51
Turnout		2,151	71.04	+5.66
Eligible voters		3,028		
Liberal hold		Swing		+5.90
Source: Elections Ontario

1879 Ontario general election
Party	Candidate	Votes	%	±%
Liberal	Thomas Blezard	1,078	53.21	
Conservative	W.H. Calcutt	948	46.79	−3.80
Total valid votes		2,026	65.38	
Eligible voters		3,099		
Liberal gain from Conservative		Swing		+1.90
Source: Elections Ontario

Ontario provincial by-election, September 1875 Previous election voided
Party	Candidate	Votes	%	±%
Conservative	John C. O'Sullivan	722	50.60	−11.08
Independent	J. Hogan	365	25.58	
Independent	W. Sargent	340	23.83	
Total valid votes		1,427		
Conservative hold		Swing		−11.08
Source: History of the Electoral Districts, Legislatures and Ministries of the Province of Ontario

1875 Ontario general election
Party	Candidate	Votes	%	±%
Conservative	John C. O'Sullivan	759	52.13	−9.55
Liberal	James Stratton	697	47.87	+9.87
Total valid votes		1,456	67.47	+6.92
Eligible voters		2,158		
Election voided
Source: Elections Ontario

1871 Ontario general election
Party	Candidate	Votes	%	±%
Conservative	George Read	779	61.68	−0.84
Liberal	Mr. O'Donohoe	480	38.00	+0.53
Independent	Mr. Pearce	4	0.32	
Turnout		1,263	60.55	−20.27
Eligible voters		2,086		
Conservative hold		Swing		−0.69
Source: Elections Ontario

1867 Ontario general election
Party	Candidate	Votes	%
Conservative	George Read	996	62.52
Liberal	E. Ingram	597	37.48
Total valid votes		1,593	80.82
Eligible voters		1,971	
Conservative pickup new district.			
Source: Elections Ontario
