= Walter Pitman =

Canadian politician (1929–2018)

Walter Pitman OC OOnt

Director of the Ontario Institute for Studies in Education
- In office 1986–1992
- Preceded by: Bernard Shapiro
- Succeeded by: A. Kruger

Executive Director of the Ontario Arts Council
- In office 1980–1986
- Preceded by: Louis Applebaum
- Succeeded by: Christopher Wootten

President of Ryerson Polytechnical Institute
- In office 1975–1980
- Preceded by: George Korey (acting)
- Succeeded by: Brian Segal

Dean of Arts and Science, Trent University
- In office 1972–1975
- Preceded by: Thomas Nind
- Succeeded by: David Cameron

Member of the Ontario Provincial Parliament for Peterborough
- In office 1967–1971
- Preceded by: Keith Brown
- Succeeded by: John Turner

Member of Parliament for Peterborough
- In office 1960–1962
- Preceded by: Gordon Fraser
- Succeeded by: Fred Stenson

Personal details
- Born: May 18, 1929 Toronto, Ontario
- Died: June 12, 2018 (aged 89)
- Party: New Democrat
- Spouse: Florence Ida Collinge (m. 1952)
- Education: University of Toronto
- Profession: Teacher

Walter George Pitman OC OOnt (May 18, 1929 – June 12, 2018) was an educator and politician in Ontario, Canada.

== Early life and education ==
Born in Toronto, Ontario, he received a Bachelor of Arts in 1952 and a Master of Arts in 1954 from the University of Toronto. He died in 2018 at the age of 89.

== Politics ==
His victory in a federal by-election held in Peterborough, Ontario on October 31, 1960, as a candidate for the New Party was a significant catalyst in the movement to refound the social democratic Cooperative Commonwealth Federation as the New Democratic Party (NDP).

Pitman was a high school teacher when he was nominated by Peterborough's New Party Club to be their candidate in a 1960 by-election. The by-election was called at a time when the CCF, which had been almost wiped out in the 1958 federal election, was in the process of creating, with the Canadian Labour Congress, a new social democratic political party. The call for a yet unnamed "new party" led to the creation of New Party Clubs across the country. The by-election in Peterborough became a test for the arguments of New Party advocates that a political party with the support of organized labour would lead to breakthroughs for the left in Canada.

The CCF had never won an election in Peterborough. As a New Party candidate, however, Pitman won over 13,000 votes, beating his nearest opponent by nearly 3,000 votes. Pitman not only won a seat in the House of Commons of Canada but his electoral performance dwarfed the 1,800 votes the CCF had received in the riding in the 1957 and 1958 elections.

Pitman's victory energized the New Party movement, and, in 1961, the CCF and CLC formed a new political entity, the New Democratic Party.

Despite Pitman's new found political celebrity he narrowly lost his seat in the 1962 election by 564 votes. He was defeated again in the 1963 election by 804 votes.

In the 1967 Ontario provincial election, Pitman won the Peterborough seat for the Ontario New Democratic Party. As a Member of Provincial Parliament (MPP), Pitman unsuccessfully ran to replace Donald C. MacDonald as leader of the provincial NDP. He came in second to Stephen Lewis at the 1970 Ontario NDP leadership convention. He lost his seat in the 1971 provincial election.

== Later life ==
Following his electoral defeat, Pitman became dean of arts and science at Trent University, where he had taught and served as associate registrar in the mid-1960s. In 1975 he became president of Ryerson Polytechnical Institute in Toronto. Robert Gardner wrote of Pitman's leadership years at Ryerson University, "He was universally admired by his colleagues. His approach to education and administration was humane, inclusive, and generous. Many of us who worked closely with him attempted to emulate his remarkable example. That was his most enduring legacy."

Pitman subsequently served as executive director of the Ontario Arts Council, then as director of the Ontario Institute for Studies in Education.

Pitman is also a former president of the Canadian Civil Liberties Association.

In 1992, he was made an Officer of the Order of Canada. He was also awarded the Order of Ontario.

== Publications ==
Walter Pitman wrote for the Peterborough Examiner, and had a weekly column in the Toronto Star. He had five books published, including four biographies he wrote after retiring:

- The Baptists and Public Affairs in the Province of Canada, 1840-1867. Arno Press. 1980.
- Louis Applebaum: A Passion for Culture. Dundurn Press. 2002. ISBN 978-1-55002-398-5.
- Music Makers: The Lives of Harry Freedman & Mary Morrison. Dundurn Press. 2006. ISBN 978-1-55002-589-7.
- Elmer Iseler: Choral Visionary. Dundurn Press. 2008. ISBN 978-1-55002-815-7.
- Victor Feldbrill: Canadian Conductor Extraordinaire. Dundurn Press. 2010. ISBN 978-1-55488-768-2.

Academic offices
Preceded by Bernard Shapiro	Director of Ontario Institute for Studies in Education; 1986–1992	Succeeded by A.Kruger
Preceded by George Korey	President of Ryerson Polytechnical Institute; 1975–1980	Succeeded by Brian Segal
Preceded by Thomas Nind	Dean of Arts and Science, Trent University; 1972–1975	Succeeded by David Cameron
Cultural offices
Preceded by Louis Applebaum	Executive Director of Ontario Arts Council; 1980–1986	Succeeded by Christopher Wooten
Political offices
Preceded by Keith Brown	Member of Ontario Provincial Parliament for Peterborough; 1967–1971	Succeeded by John Melville Turner
Preceded by Gordon Fraser	Member of Parliament for Peterborough; 1960–1962	Succeeded by Fred Stenson
