= William A. Anderson (Canadian politician) =

Canadian politician

Ontario MPP
- In office May 29, 1902 – May 2, 1908
- Preceded by: Thomas Blezard
- Succeeded by: James Thompson
- Constituency: Peterborough East

Personal details
- Born: August 26, 1837 Otonabee, Upper Canada
- Died: May 21, 1908 (aged 70) Peterborough, Ontario
- Party: Liberal
- Occupation: Farmer

William A. Anderson (August 26, 1837 – May 21, 1908) was a Canadian farmer and politician in Ontario. He represented Peterborough East in the Legislative Assembly of Ontario as a Liberal from 1902 to 1908.

Anderson was born in Otonabee, Upper Canada, the son of James Anderson and Elizabeth Lang, both of Scottish origin. He was educated in Otonabee and worked as a farmer. He married on June 24, 1874.

Before entering provincial politics, Anderson spent 25 consecutive years in municipal government, serving as a councillor, deputy reeve, reeve and warden. In the 1902 Ontario general election he defeated Conservative S.P. Ford, and in the 1905 election he defeated Conservative H.A. Moore.

Anderson died on May 21, 1908 at Nicholls Hospital in Peterborough.
