= Thomas Blezard =

Canadian politician

Ontario MPP
- In office 1879–1902
- Preceded by: John C. O'Sullivan
- Succeeded by: William A. Anderson
- Constituency: Peterborough East

Personal details
- Born: November 24, 1838 Peterborough County, Upper Canada
- Died: April 19, 1902 (aged 63)
- Party: Liberal
- Spouse: Mary Meikle (m. 1865)

Thomas Blezard (November 24, 1838 – April 19, 1902) was an Ontario political figure.

== Early life and career ==
Blezard was born in Otonabee Township, Peterborough County, Upper Canada in 1838.

He represented Peterborough East in the Legislative Assembly of Ontario as a Liberal member from 1879 to 1902.

== Personal life ==
In 1865, he married Mary Meikle. He served on the township council for nine years and the county council for five years.

== Legacy ==
The Blezard Valley neighbourhood in Sudbury was named after him.

== Electoral history ==
1879 Ontario general election: Peterborough East
Party	Candidate	Votes	%	±%
Liberal	Thomas Blezard	1,078	53.21	
Conservative	W.H. Calcutt	948	46.79	−3.80
Total valid votes		2,026	65.38	
Eligible voters		3,099		
Liberal gain from Conservative		Swing		+1.90
Source: Elections Ontario
