= Paul Rouleau =

Canadian judge in Ontario

The Honourable Paul Rouleau

Personal details
- Born: Paul S. Rouleau
- Education: University of Ottawa; York University

Paul S. Rouleau is a justice of the Court of Appeal for Ontario, Canada. He was the commissioner of the Public Order Emergency Commission that conducted the Inquiry into Emergencies Act mandated by law to study and report on the circumstances that led to the invoking of the Emergencies Act on February 14, 2022 by the government of Prime Minister Justin Trudeau during the Canada convoy protests.

== Education ==
Rouleau received his Bachelor of Administration in 1974 and his LL.B in 1977, both from the University of Ottawa. He received a Masters in Law from York University in 1984.

== Career ==
Rouleau was a partner with the law firms Cassels Brock & Blackwell from his call to the Bar in 1979 to 1987, Genest Murray, DesBrisay, Lamek from 1987 to 2000, and Heenan Blaikie from 2000 to 2002.

In 1983, Rouleau was part of John Turner’s campaign for leadership of the Liberal Party of Canada after Pierre Trudeau announced retirement. Contemporary media reports described him as either Turner's executive assistant or appointments secretary.

Rouleau was appointed as a Justice of the Ontario Superior Court of Justice and to the Court of Appeal for Ontario in 2005. He was appointed as a Deputy Judge of the Supreme Court of Yukon in 2014, Nunavut Court of Justice in 2017 and Supreme Court of the Northwest Territories in 2017.

Since his appointments, Justice Rouleau has been involved in the continuing legal education of judges and lawyers. He chairs the Ontario Attorney General’s Access to Justice in French Advisory Committee and serves on the board for the Law Commission of Ontario. Rouleau was also a founding member of the Association des juristes d’expression française de l’Ontario and was its President from 1985 to 1987. He has also served as Trustee of the Metropolitan Toronto Separate School Board from 1986 to 1991.

He is the recipient of several awards and recognitions, including an Honorary Doctorate of Laws from York University and the Ordre des francophones d’Amérique, awarded by the Conseil supérieur de la langue française du Québec. In 2005, he was inducted into the Common Law Honour Society of the University of Ottawa.

=== Emergencies Act inquiry ===
On April 25, 2022, Prime Minister Trudeau selected Rouleau to be the commissioner of the Public Order Emergency Commission inquiry into the invocation of the Emergencies Act, which had occurred in response to the 2022 Canada convoy protest. In February 2023, on behalf of the commission, he concluded that the threshold for invocation of the Emergencies Act was met.

Toronto Sun opinion columnist Lorne Gunter criticized the report's conclusion, and wrote that "Rouleau read into the Emergencies Act his own form of the Constitution's notwithstanding clause". In another opinion column in the Toronto Sun, Brian Lilley noted that Rouleau had faced public allegations that he was Trudeau's uncle. A fact check by CTV News discredited claims that Rouleau was related to Trudeau. CTV could not find records of donations from Rouleau to the Liberal Party, but did find that Rouleau's wife had, in fact, donated to the Liberals in 2006. Lilley also pointed out Rouleau's deep ties to the Liberal party, adding "there is no clear indication that Justice Rouleau has had anything to do with Liberal Party politics in nearly a quarter century", but suggested that it would have been better to appoint "someone whose independence couldn't be questioned".
