= Gillian Sandeman =

Canadian politician

Ontario MPP
- In office 1975–1977
- Preceded by: John Melville Turner
- Succeeded by: John Melville Turner
- Constituency: Peterborough

Personal details
- Born: 1937 (age 88–89)
- Party: New Democrat
- Spouse: Sandy Sandeman
- Occupation: Probation officer

Gillian Ann Sandeman (born c. 1937) is a former politician from Ontario, Canada. She was a New Democratic member of the Legislative Assembly of Ontario from 1975 to 1977. She represented the riding of Peterborough.

== Background ==
Sandeman is a prominent social activist in the Peterborough area, having served as a president of the city's social planning council, and has written an occasional gardening column for the Peterborough Examiner.

== Politics ==
Sandeman ran as the New Democratic Party candidate for Peterborough in the 1974 federal election, losing to incumbent MP Hugh Faulkner. In the 1975 provincial election she ran as the NDP candidate in the riding of Peterborough. She defeated Progressive Conservative incumbent John Turner by 505 votes. Two years later she lost to Turner in a rematch, this time losing by 2,648 votes. She was the NDP candidate in the 1988 Federal election but lost to PC incumbent Bill Domm.

In 1978, she considered running in the leadership convention to replace Stephen Lewis but decided against it. Later that year she became executive director of the Elizabeth Fry Society. In 1984, she was elected president of the Ontario NDP. In 1986, at a party convention she defeated Judy Rebick who challenged her position as party president. In 1988, she became vice-president of the Federal NDP and was a professor at Trent University.

In 1991 she accepted a position as executive assistant to Education Minister Marion Boyd. In 1994, she was appointed to the Ontario Parole Board.
