= Alexander Leslie Elliott =

Canadian politician

Alexander Leslie Elliott (September 14, 1902 – 1975) was a lawyer and politician in Ontario, Canada. He represented Peterborough in the Legislative Assembly of Ontario from 1937 to 1943 as a Liberal.

The son of Edward Morrow Elliott and Isabella Lavinia Fitzgerald, he was born in Smith township, Peterborough County and was educated in Peterborough and at Osgoode Hall Law School.
