= Tamara Lich =

Canadian political activist

- Born: Arlene Catherine Martineau; September 20, 1973 (age 53); Saskatoon, Saskatchewan
- Occupations: Administrator, musician
- Employer: Rebel News
- Known for: Canada convoy protest leadership
- Political party: Maverick Party
- Opponent: Trudeau government
- Spouse: Dwayne Lich
- Children: 2
- Conviction: Mischief
- Penalty: 12 months house arrest and 6 months curfew
- Accomplice: Chris Barber

Details
- Country: Canada
- Imprisoned at: Ottawa-Carleton Detention Centre (Feb-Mar 2022)
- Website: twitter.com/LichTamara/

Tamara Lich is a Canadian activist who has organized for the right-wing Maverick Party, the far-right Yellow Vest protests, and the Canada convoy protest in Ottawa.

Lich was among the organizers of yellow vest protests in Alberta in late 2018 and early 2019. Based in Medicine Hat, Alberta, Lich was also an early leader of the secessionist movement "Wexit", which later became the Wildrose Independence Party of Alberta. In 2022, she was one of three organizers of the Canada convoy protests in Ottawa. She was arrested in Ottawa on February 17, 2022, and initially denied bail. She was released upon appeal, then re-arrested and denied bail again. Another appeal in July 2022 led to her re-release. In April 2025, she was convicted of mischief for her leadership role in the protest.

== Early life and career ==
Lich was born in Saskatoon, Saskatchewan. Lich has predominately worked in logistics in the energy field, including as a base administrator for STEP Energy Services, and also as a fitness instructor. She is a guitarist and lead vocalist in the Alberta-based band Blind Monday.

== Activism and politics ==
=== Yellow vest movement ===
Lich was an organizer for the far-right yellow vest protests in Medicine Hat in late December 2018 and early 2019. Following death threats made towards Prime Minister Justin Trudeau, Lich debated a name change for the group to distance their aims from those promoting violence.

=== Western Canada secessionism ===
She opposed the Oil Tanker Moratorium Act and Bill-69 that regulated the oil industry in Canada. Lich advocates against legislation that does not take regional differences into account. In 2020, she opined that there are different needs for legislation on gun control in downtown Toronto compared to rural Alberta. As a leader of the Maverick Party, she advocated for a unified voice of people in western Canada to push for constitutional reform as a first priority and secession as the second. She resigned from the board of directors of the Maverick Party in early 2022.

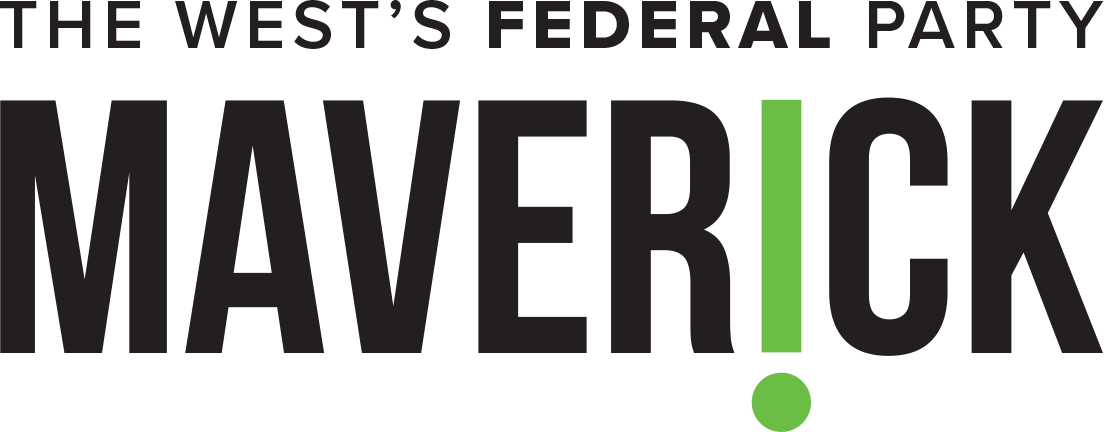
Maverick Party logo

Lich was a leader in the Wexit movement which later became the Wildrose Independence Party of Alberta. Lich left the Wildrose party to join the separatist Maverick Party where she served as a member of its first governing council. In 2022, she was the secretary of the Maverick Party's Western Canadian Governing Council.

Lich was involved in the 2018 United We Roll protest convoy.

=== COVID-19 pandemic ===
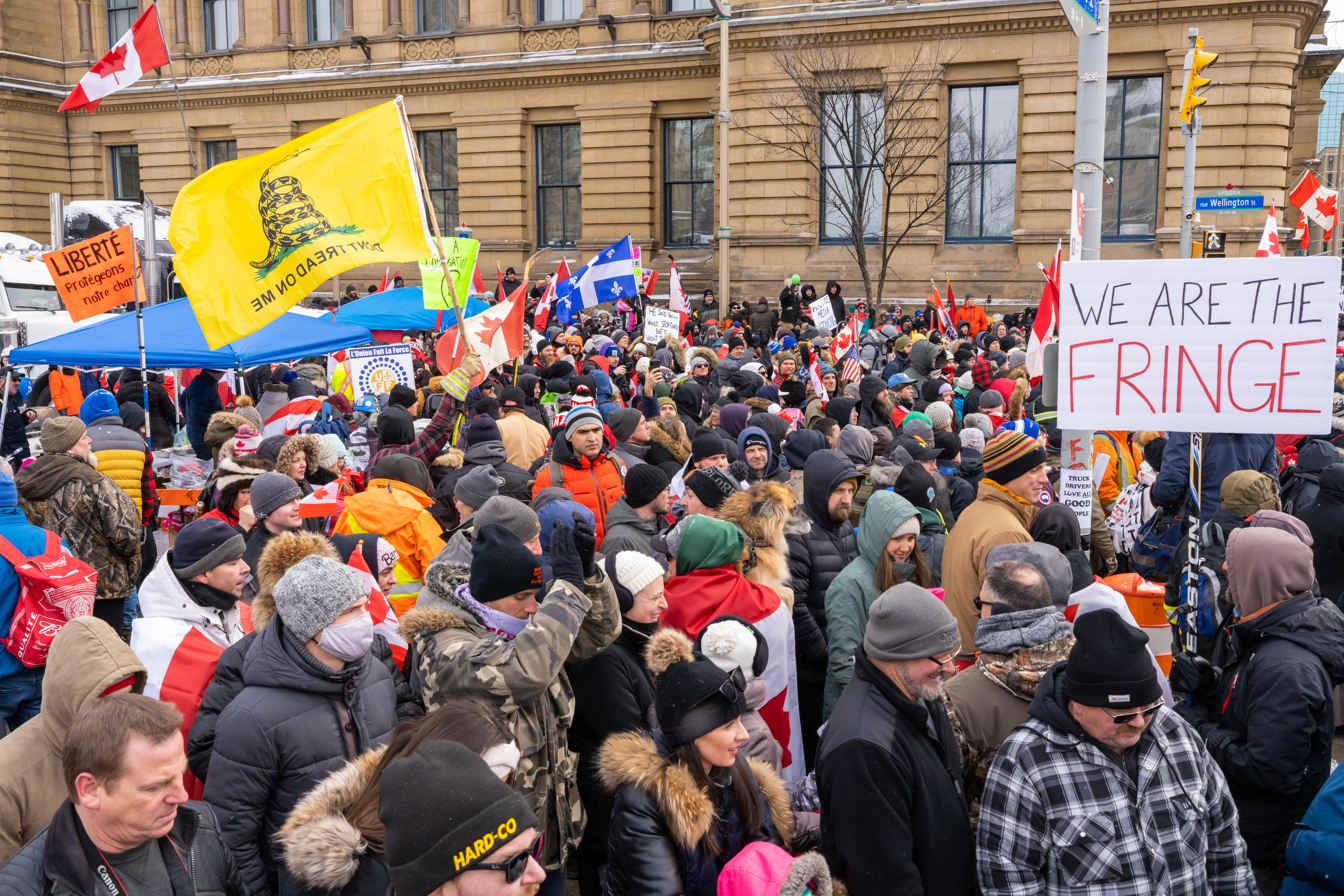
Convoy protest, Ottawa, 2022

Speaking at a news conference on February 3, 2022, Lich called on all levels of government in Canada to put an end to COVID-19 public health measures. The next day, she praised Saskatchewan Premier Scott Moe for ending provincial COVID-19 restrictions.

Lich was a primary organizer of the 2022 Canada convoy protest in Ottawa, as well as a spokesperson and an organizer of the fundraising of the protest. She led negotiations on behalf of the convoy movement with Ottawa Mayor Jim Watson.

Lich spoke publicly about how she felt offended that the protesters were being portrayed in the media as racist and sexist. Lich has been outspoken against forms of extremism at the protests.

== Arrest and trial ==
Lich was arrested in Ottawa on February 17, 2022, accused of counselling to commit mischief, and held in the Ottawa-Carleton Detention Centre. Justice Julie Bourgeois denied her application for bail on February 22, 2022. Diane Magas, defence lawyer for Lich, expressed concern about the neutrality of Justice Bourgeois on the basis that she ran for a federal Liberal Party seat in 2011. Her denial of bail was protested in Ottawa. On March 7, 2022, the bail denial was overturned, and Lich was granted bail on the conditions that she refrain from use of social media, refrain from contact with other protest organizers, that she leave Ottawa within 24 hours and the province of Ontario within 72 hours, and to only return to the province for court-related reasons.

On March 24, 2022, an additional six charges were laid against Lich: counselling mischief, mischief, counselling to obstruct police, obstructing police, counselling intimidation, and intimidation by blocking and obstructing one or more highways.

On April 26, 2022, Calgary-based Justice Centre for Constitutional Freedoms (JCCF) announced that Lich will be awarded The George Jonas Freedom Award for her work during the Canada convoy protest. JCCF was one of the lead supporters of the convoy protest and provided its legal support. On June 27, 2022, Lich was re-arrested by the Royal Canadian Mounted Police in Alberta for allegedly breaching her bail conditions. Lich attended a JCCF award ceremony on June 17 and met convoy organizer Tom Marazzo, with whom she had been ordered to have no contact. On July 8, Lich's bail application was denied, although that decision was overturned on July 26. Lich's trial began September 5, 2023 and lasted 45 days. She was represented by lawyer Lawrence Greenspon.

When Lich visited the spectator's gallery of the Alberta Legislature in late February 2023, she was applauded by sitting politicians, after she was introduced as "a grandma, a musician, and a true leader within the freedom movement" by independent politician Drew Barnes.

In March 2023, government prosecutors were accused of malice after phone records between Chris Barber and Lich were briefly released online. Content included personal details and business communications unconnected to the convoy protest. Barber's legal team, with support from the Crown, secured a publication ban to protect his and Lich's privacy. The Crown stated that the data release was an oversight. Barber's defence also briefly released the same records.

On April 3, 2025, Lich and Barber were convicted of mischief. The judge found that the two had regularly encouraged others to join and remain in the convoy despite the negative effects on downtown Ottawa. Lich and Barber were both acquitted of intimidation and counselling intimidation, with the judge holding that their repeated calls to remain peaceful was fatal to those charges because they negated the necessary menace or violence. The pair was also acquitted of obstructing police and counselling someone to obstruct police. A charge of counselling someone to commit mischief was dropped by prosecutors against both Barber and Lich as unnecessary after the mischief conviction. Lich and Barber were sentenced to 12 months of house arrest followed by six months of curfew.

== Personal life ==
Lich lives in Medicine Hat, Alberta. She is married to Dwayne Lich, and is both a mother and a grandmother; one of her daughters was born premature. One of her daughters works as a nurse. She has claimed Métis heritage.

== Works ==
- Hold the Line: My Story From the Heart of the Freedom Convoy ISBN 978-1990583032

== See also ==
- Chris Sky
