= Christopher John Barber =

Canadian convoy protest organizer

Chris Barber
- Born: Christopher John Barber; 1975 (age 50–51)
- Citizenship: Canadian
- Occupations: Trucking company owner and operator
- Known for: Canada convoy protest co-organiser

Christopher John Barber (born 1975) is a Canadian trucking company operator and activist who co-led the Canadian convoy protest. He was arrested on February 17, 2022, and released on bail the next day. He gave evidence at the Public Order Emergency Commission in November 2022, speaking about his power struggles with fellow organizer Pat King. In April 2025, Barber was convicted of mischief and counselling others to ignore a court order.

== Career ==
Christopher John Barber is a truck driver from Swift Current, Saskatchewan who operates his own trucking company, C. B. Trucking Limited.

== Activism ==
Barber is vaccinated against COVID19, but considers vaccine mandates to be government tyranny. He has two confederate flags hanging in his home, which he described on a TikTok broadcast as a "piece of cloth." Barber operates two TikTok accounts BigRed1975 and ChrisBarber1975. Barber describes himself as an "internet troll."

Along with Pat King and Tamara Lich, Barber was one of three main organisers of the Canadian convoy protest. In January 2022, he spoke of his ambition to persuade politicians to end vaccine mandates. On February 2, in the context of noise complaints from Ottawa residents, he released the written statement: "Our message to the citizens of Ottawa is one of empathy".

=== Criminal charges ===
Barber was arrested February 17, 2022, near Parliament Hill. Earlier the same week, Prime Minister Justin Trudeau had invoked the Emergencies Act, as part of a strategy to end the protest. Barber was charged with counselling to commit mischief counselling to disobey a court order, and counselling to obstruct police. The next day, he was released from custody, on bail and ordered to leave Ottawa and to avoid contact with Tamara Lich and Pat King. Barber's court appearance is scheduled for September 5, 2023 and is expected to last 16 days.

During the November 2022 Public Order Emergency Commission, Barber spoke of his tension and power struggle with fellow organiser Pat King. He also spoke about his own racist and anti-muslim internet posts.

In March 2023, government prosecutors were accused of malice after phone records between Chris Barber and Lich were briefly released online. Content included personal details and business communications unconnected to the convoy protest. Barber's legal team, with support from The Crown, secured a publication ban to protect both his and Lich's privacy. The Crown stated that the data release was an oversight.

In April 2023, Barber pled not guilty to the criminal charge of counselling others to disobey a court, based on activities he undertook in February of the same year.

In January 2024 the CBC said that he faced a maximum penalty of 10 years in prison, for the mischief charge.

On April 3, 2025, Barber and Lich were both convicted of mischief. The judge found that the two had regularly encouraged others to join and remain in the convoy despite the negative effects on downtown Ottawa and specifically referenced one of Barber's TikTok videos in which he suggested that an empty intersection would be improved by trucks and that any trucks removed by the authorities should be replaced. Barber was also convicted of counselling others to disobey a court order for instructing protestors to defy a court injunction against honking their truck horns. Barber and Lich were both acquitted of intimidation and counselling intimidation, with the judge holding that their repeated calls to remain peaceful was fatal to those charges because they negated the necessary menace or violence. The pair was also acquitted of obstructing police and counselling someone to obstruct police. A charge of counselling someone to commit mischief was dropped by prosecutors against both Barber and Lich as unnecessary after the mischief conviction. Sentencing was scheduled for April 16.

== Personal life ==
Barber is married to his wife, and has a son and daughter. They live in Saskatchewan.

He was aged 46 in February 2022.
