= Convoi de la liberté =

Convoi de la liberté (English: "freedom convoy") may refer to one of two protests against restrictions relating to the COVID-19 pandemic, including:

- Canada convoy protest
- France convoy protest
