= Daniel Bulford =

Canadian former police officer

Daniel Bulford is a former Royal Canadian Mounted Police officer who became the head of security for the Canada convoy protest in 2022.

== Career ==
Bulford is a former Royal Canadian Mounted Police intelligence officer and sniper who was part of Prime Minister Justin Trudeau’s security team He resigned from the police force in December 2021 after fifteen years of service. He was critical of the government of Canada's requirement for police to be vaccinated for COVID-19 before he resigned.

== Activism ==
In October 2021, Bullford was a guest on Keean Bexte's podcast The Counter Signal.

Bulford was head of security of the 2022 Canada convoy protest in Ottawa. He also performed the role of spokesperson, and was a liaison focal point for authorities. During his time in the role he spoke of his good relations with police forces. Bulford was arrested on February 18, 2022 in Ottawa and later released without charge.

In a document submitted to the public enquiry into the Canadian government use of the Emergencies Act, the Ontario Provincial Police stated that Bulford leaked the Prime Minister's schedule, a claim that he denied while giving evidence at the enquiry.

Bulford is a leader of Mounties 4 Freedom.

== Personal life ==
Bulford grew up in Alberta, and is married.
