= Caroline Orr Bueno =

American researcher and journalist

- Education: Virginia Commonwealth University (PhD)
- Occupations: Researcher, journalist
- Writing career
- Years active: 2016–current
- Subject: Disinformation
- Website: Caroline Orr Bueno, PhD on X

Caroline Orr Bueno is an American social and behavioral sciences researcher specializing in disinformation networks.

Orr Bueno gained notoriety by angering Roger Stone on social media in 2017. She recalls her first encounter with Russian disinformation back when she was researching social media messaging around the 2016 Ebola outbreak. She claimed she saw overlaps in her Ebola messaging dataset with Russian interference in the 2016 United States elections.

This led her to Russian disinformation in extremist conspiracy theories. A 2023 study by Orr Bueno found that RT covered the 2022 Canadian Freedom convoy far more than any other outlet.

Orr Bueno was quoted by NPR as 'a behavioral scientist who studies disinformation at the University of Maryland' in their report about being labelled 'state-affiliated' by Twitter. Her comment was "Twitter's move could muddy the water in a news environment where it's already difficult to decipher which outlets are reliable and have editorial independence."
