= Canadian Trucking Alliance =

Canadian federation of provincial trucking associations

- Type: Trade association
- Purpose: Road transport
- Headquarters: Toronto, Ontario
- Region served: Canada
- President: Stephen Laskowski
- Website: cantruck.ca

The Canadian Trucking Alliance (CTA) is a Canadian federation of provincial trucking associations. They represent approximately 4,500 carriers, owner-operators, and industry suppliers. The CTA's head office is in Toronto with provincial association offices in Vancouver, Calgary, Regina, Winnipeg, Montreal, and Moncton.

== History ==
On January 22, 2022, the CTA announced that it “strongly disapproves” of the Freedom Convoy of trucks heading to Ottawa as a protest against COVID-19 vaccine mandates in the industry. Some truckers participating in the protest might be represented by CTA in the trucking industry concerning legislation.

== See also ==
- American Trucking Associations
