= France convoy protest =

2022 protest against COVID-19 restrictions in France

- Part of COVID-19 protests in France
- Date: February 11, 2022
- Location: Paris, France
- Caused by: COVID-19 pandemic in France, vaccine mandates in France
- Methods: Convoy
- Status: Ended

Parties
Liberty Convoy	Government of France

The French convoy protest le Convoi de la Liberté ("the liberty convoy") was a protest in Paris inspired by the Canadian convoy protests. They were protesting COVID-19 restrictions as well as president Emmanuel Macron.

Officials in Paris and Brussels banned protests relating to the Freedom Convoy, following information from organizers of a similar event opposed to France's Health Pass that five convoys from across France are due to reach Paris between February 11 and 14.

French Police intercepted hundreds of vehicles and issued hundreds of fines in response to the protest. Riot police employed tear gas against protesters and arrested 44 people on February 12. The protesters had been armed with weapons, including "slingshots, hammers, knives, gas cans and protective equipment."

== Yellow Vest influence ==
In addition to the convoy's influence from the Freedom Convoy in Canada is the reminiscence of the Yellow Vest protests which erupted in France in late 2018. Sorbonne University professor Jean-Francois Amadieu reports "They are not only anti-vaccine pass (or anti-vax). There are other grievances on the subject of individual liberties, as well as echoes of the Yellow Vest calls for a 'citizen's initiative referendum' [to allow citizens to vet government policy proposals] and more general demands involving purchasing power."
