= Freedom Convoy =

2022 protest against COVID-19 mandates in Canada

Canada convoy protest
- Part of COVID-19 protests in Canada
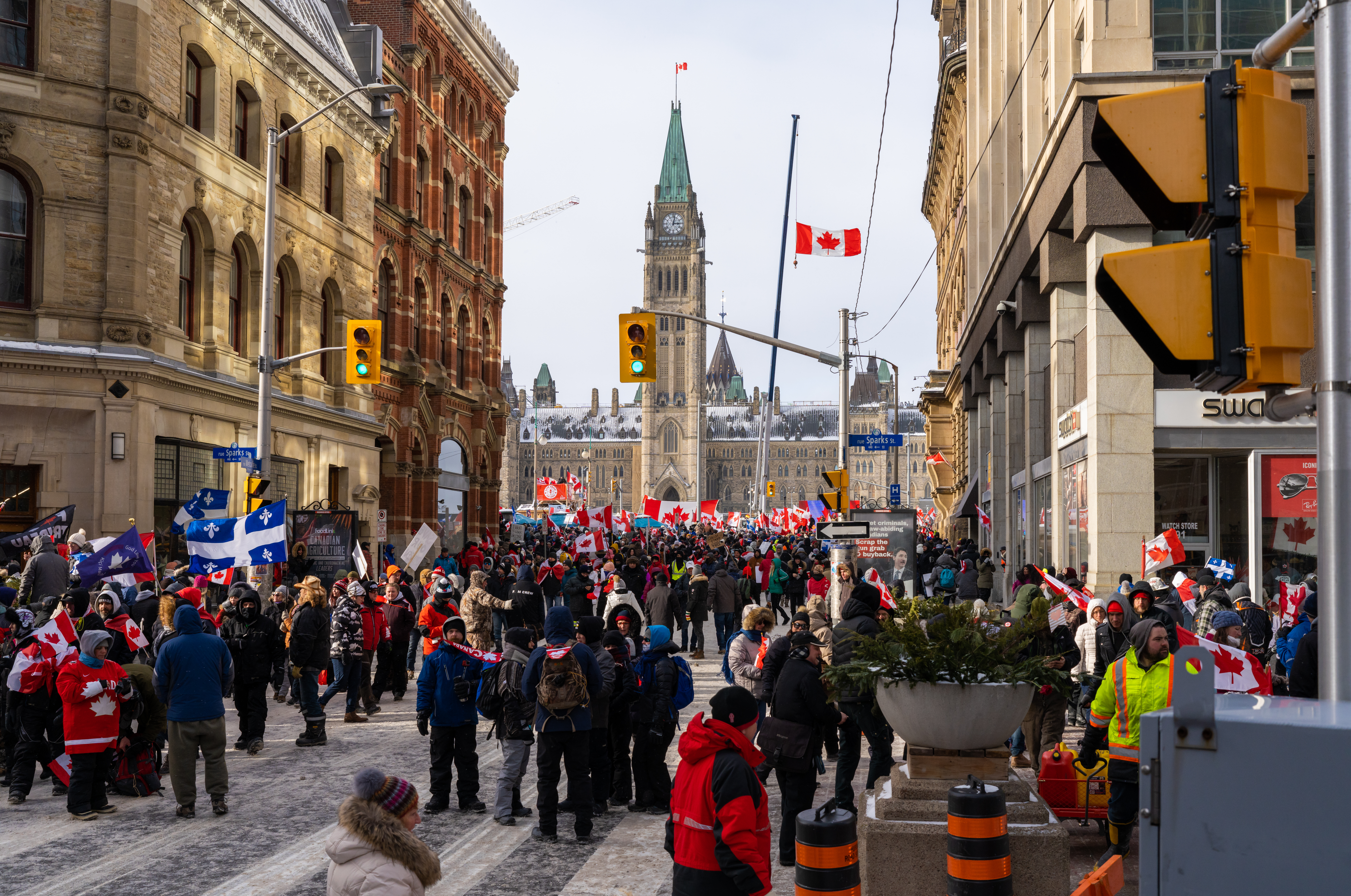
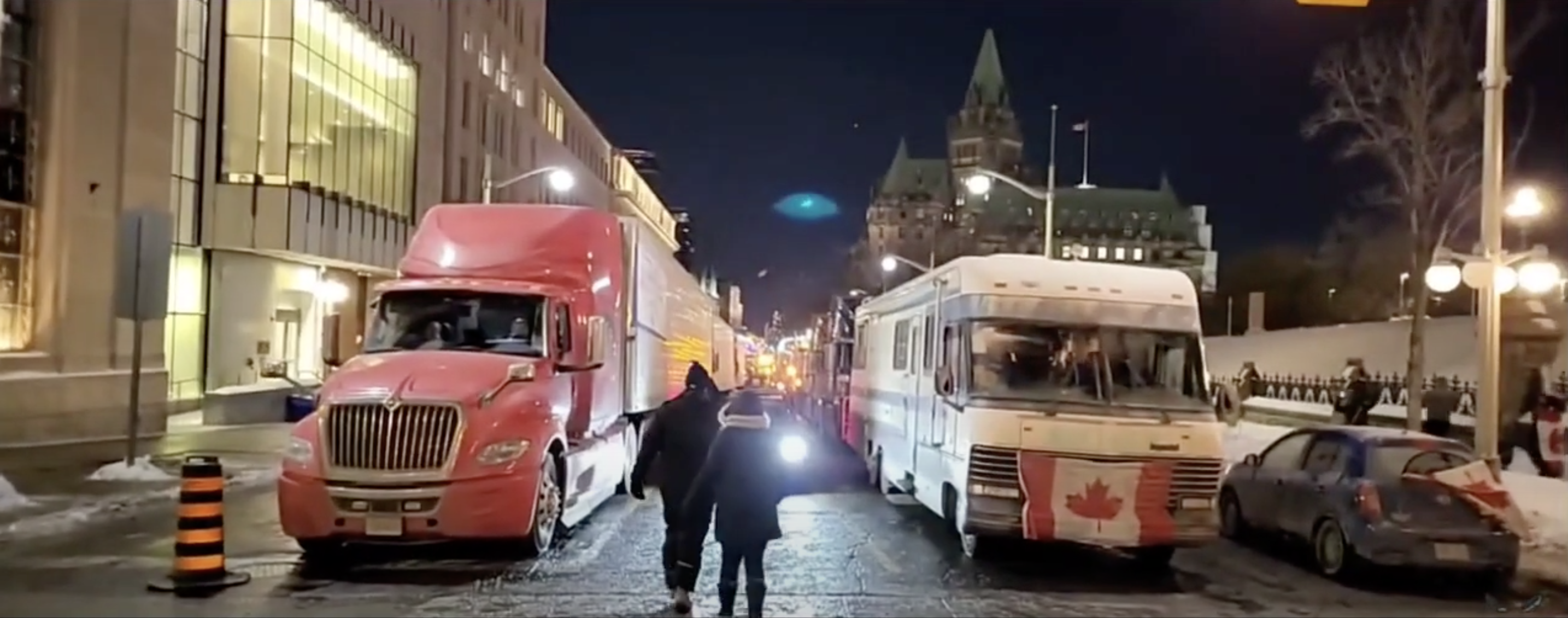
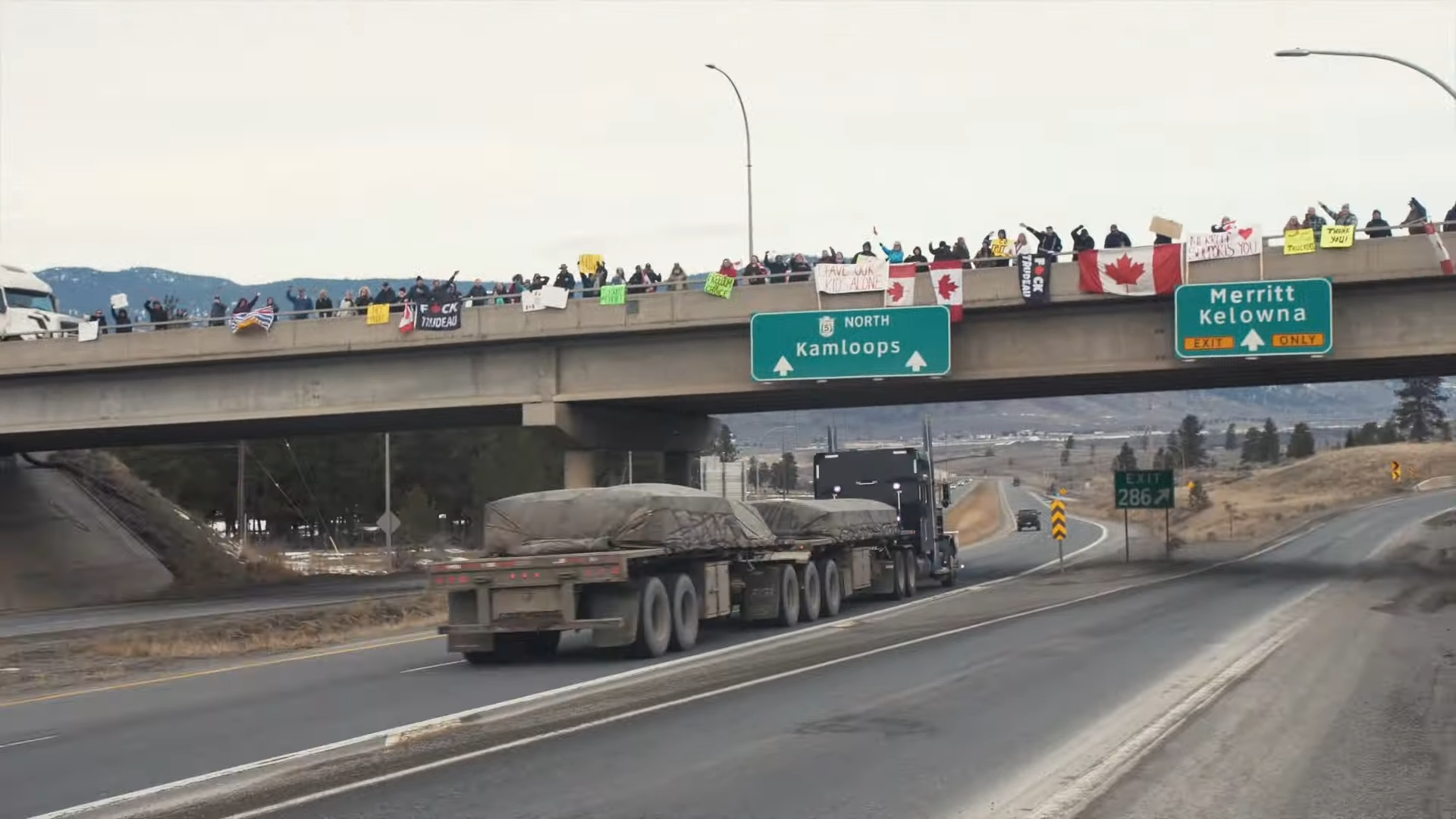
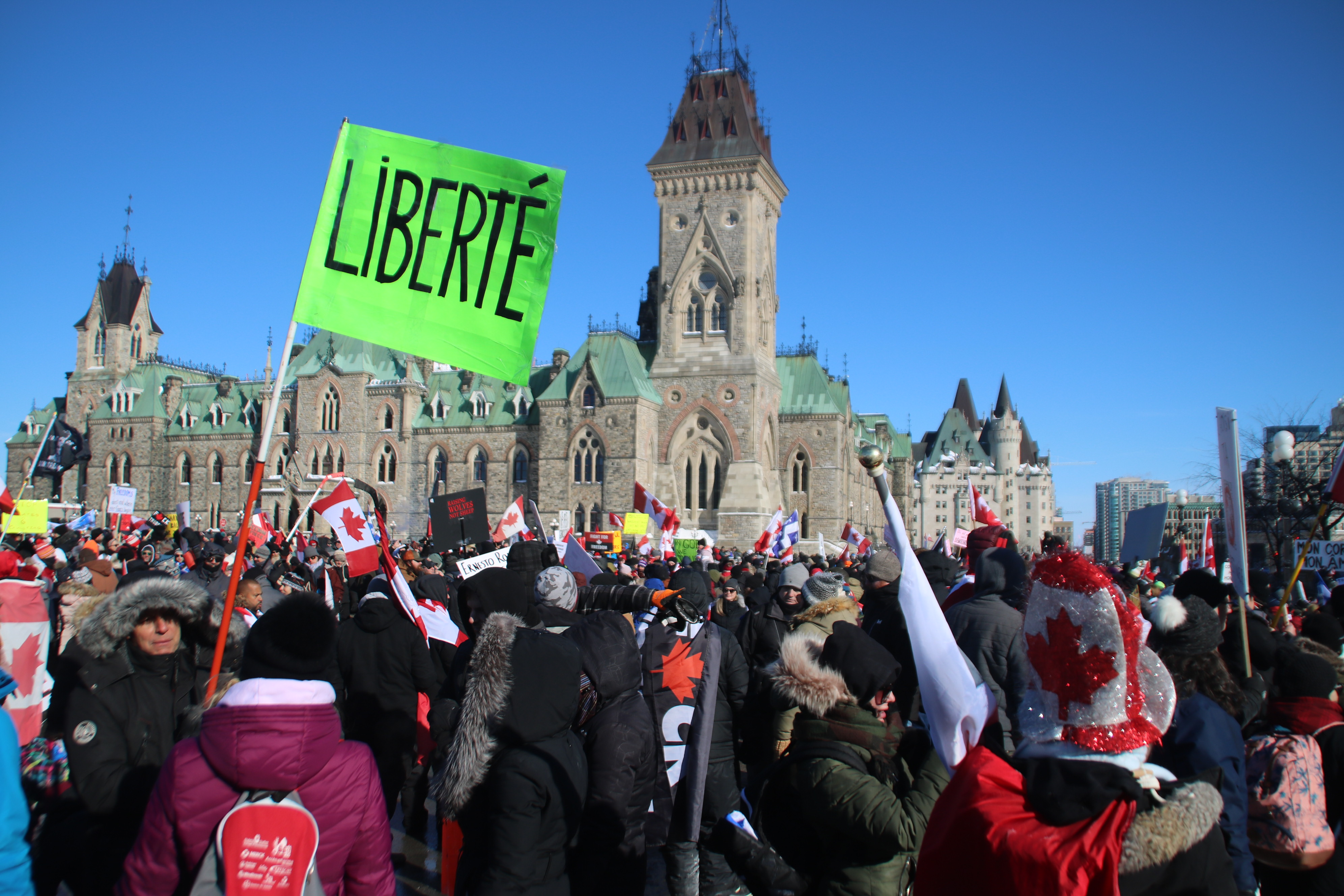
- Protesters in front of Parliament Hill on February 12, 2022 (top); Vehicles lined up on Wellington Street January 28 (middle left); Supporters greet a truck on an overpass in Merritt, British Columbia (middle right); Protesters near the East Block of Parliament Hill (bottom)
- Date: January 22 – February 23, 2022 (1 month and 1 day)
- Location: Canada (spillover into the United States)
- Caused by: COVID-19 pandemic in Canada, COVID-19 vaccination mandates in Canada
- Goals: Abolition of federal and provincial COVID-19 mandates in Canada
- Methods: Convoy protest over major Canadian highways; demonstration at Parliament Hill
- Result: No concessions given; Emergencies Act invoked from February 17 to 23, 2022

Parties
Canada Unity; Diagolon; Freedom Fighters of Canada; No More Lockdowns Canada; Political support: Conservative Party elements; People's Party; Ontario Party; New Blue Party of Ontario; Republican Party elements	Government of Canada; Royal Canadian Mounted Police; Parliamentary Protective Service; Canadian Security Intelligence Service; Government of Ontario; Ontario Provincial Police; Government of Quebec; Sûreté du Québec; Various Ontario Municipal Police Services; Ottawa Police Service; London Police Service; Hamilton Police Service; Peel Regional Police; Toronto Police Service; York Regional Police; Durham Regional Police; Anti-convoy counterprotestors; Supported by: United States; Department of Homeland Security; Department of Transportation; Political support: Green Party; Liberal Party; New Democratic Party; Ontario NDP

Lead figures
Tamara Lich; Pat King; Christopher John Barber; Benjamin Dichter; Henry Hildebrandt; Paul E. Alexander; Maxime Bernier; Tom Marazzo; Chris Sky; Randy Hillier	Justin Trudeau; Chrystia Freeland; David Lametti; Anita Anand; Doug Ford; Drew Dilkens; Marco Mendicino; John Horgan; Jim Watson; Peter Sloly; Steve Bell; David Vigneault

Number
Convoy: 551–1,155 vehicles, including: 121–230 trucks; 430–925 personal vehicles; Protests: Estimates of 3,000 to 18,000 people (Note: January 29 (estimate): 5,000–18,000 people. January 30 (estimate): 3,000 people. February 5 (estimate): 1,000 vehicles and 5,000 people.)	Unknown

Casualties, arrests and damages
- Injuries: 8 (Note: 2 (Ottawa), 4 (Winnipeg), 2 (Coutts))
- Arrested: 272 (Note: 196 (Ottawa), 42 (Windsor), 13 (Coutts), 16 (Surrey), 2 (Toronto), 2 (Peterborough), 1 (Winnipeg))
- Fined: 2,600+
- Economic loss: Estimates of up to $6 billion

The Freedom Convoy (French: Convoi de la liberté), was a series of protests and blockades across Canada in early 2022, initially organized to oppose COVID-19 vaccine mandates for cross-border truck drivers. The movement quickly expanded to protest all COVID-19 restrictions and mandates. Beginning on January 22, 2022, hundreds of vehicles departed from various locations across Canada, converging in Ottawa on January 29 for a rally at Parliament Hill, joined by thousands of pedestrian protesters. Parallel demonstrations occurred in provincial capitals and at key border crossings with the United States.

The protests followed the end of vaccine mandate exemptions for cross-border truckers, which had been in place to mitigate supply chain disruptions. Approximately 85% of Canadian truck drivers serving cross-border routes were vaccinated, but the new restrictions potentially affected up to 16,000 drivers. Protesters called for the repeal of all COVID-19 mandates and restrictions, citing concerns over personal freedoms and government overreach.

Many officials and businesses raised concerns about the economic impact of the blockades, the demonstrations drew both domestic and international support, including from members of the Conservative Party of Canada and Republican politicians in the United States. The federal government responded by invoking the Emergencies Act on February 14, 2022, granting extraordinary powers to law enforcement. By February 21, most blockades and protests had been dismantled through large-scale police operations. As part of these measures, the government froze bank accounts linked to protest organizers. Following the seizure, some supporters turned to Bitcoin to make donations to the convoy, citing its resistance to government control.

The convoy drew a varied response from the public and various organizations. Trucking groups criticized the protests, asserting most participants were not truckers. Allegations of involvement by far-right groups and calls for the federal government to be overthrown were also raised, and concerns emerged about the seizure of weapons near a blockade in Coutts, Alberta. Supporters saw the movement as a grassroots stand for liberty against government overreach.

== Background ==
=== Protest goals ===
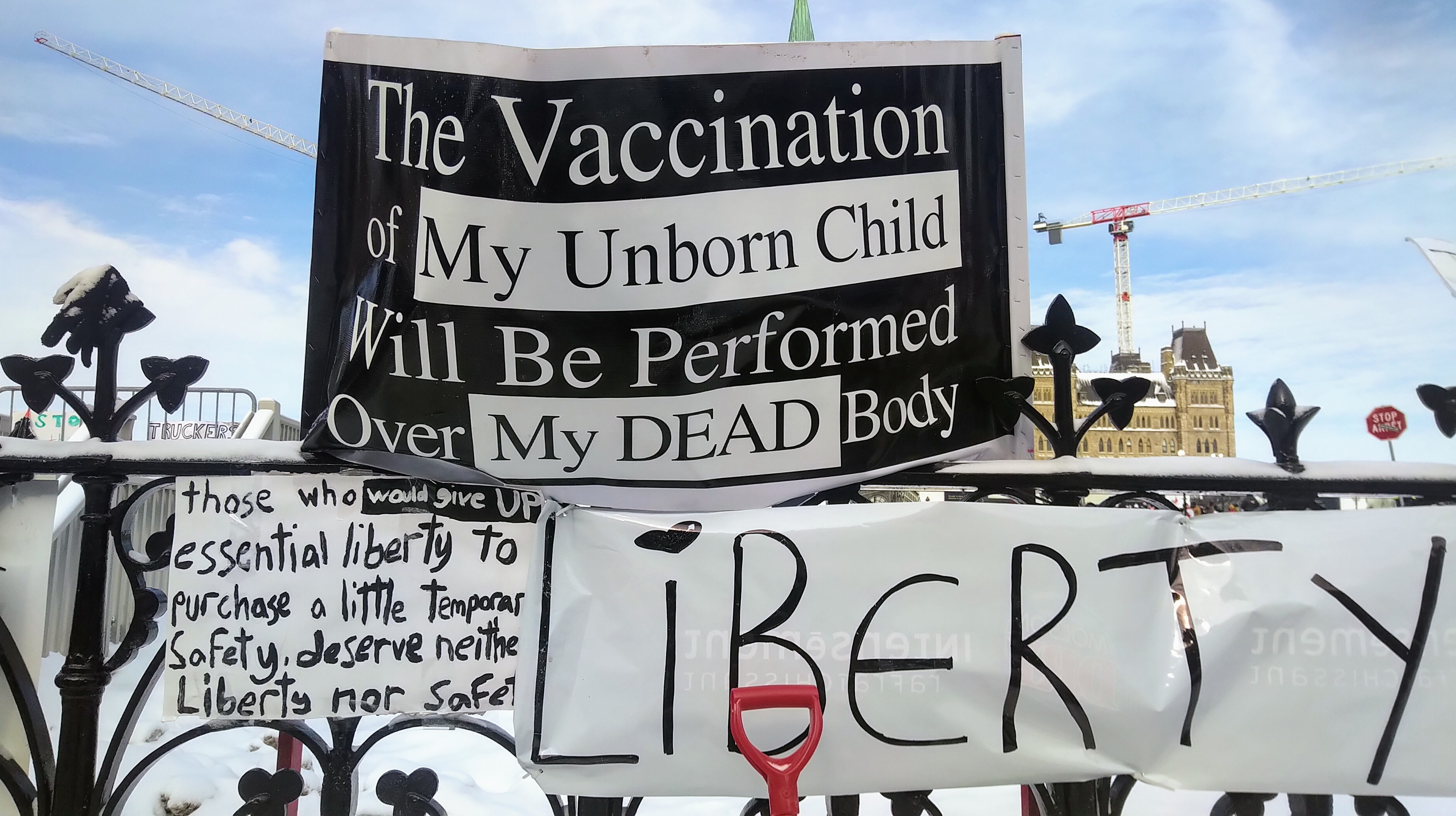
Anti-vaccine protesters at the convoy in Ottawa

The protest called for the end of vaccine mandates in Canada during the ongoing COVID-19 pandemic. Freedom Convoy's spokesperson Benjamin Dichter stated on Fox News that, "we want to get rid of the vaccine mandates and the [vaccine] passports. And that passport, that's the really concerning one."

The organizers of the original mid-January crowdsourced fundraising campaign on GoFundMe, Tamara Lich and Dichter, both of whom are not long-haul truckers, described the goal of the truck convoy, from across Canada to the nation's capital, as a demonstration against the newly implemented January 15 federal cross-border COVID-19 vaccine mandate, targeting long-haul truck drivers, according to a January 28, 2022 CTV News article.

Several protesters voiced opposition to perceived authoritarianism and corruption by Justin Trudeau, stating they wanted him "out of office", while others said, "this is not an anti-vaccination movement, this is a freedom movement." For example, Canada Unity's Ontario organizer for the convoy, Jason LaFace, said that the intent of the Canada Unity protest was to dissolve the federal government. Many of the restrictions that the protesters objected to were under provincial jurisdiction.

=== Initial events and the start of the protest ===
On November 16, 2021, Canada Border Services Agency officers refused truck driver Brigitte Belton entry to Canada at the Detroit–Windsor Tunnel due to her failure to wear a face mask.

At the October 2022 Public Order Emergency Commission, commission lawyer Stephen Armstrong stated that Belton vented her frustration via her TikTok feed before using the platform to connect with Chris Barber and later initiated the planning of the Canada convoy protest.

Armstrong said that Belton, Chris Barber, and James Bauder all took part in a Facebook live event on January 13, 2022, to plan the protest's route and logistics. The next day, Tamara Lich started the fundraiser for the protest.

==== American influence ====
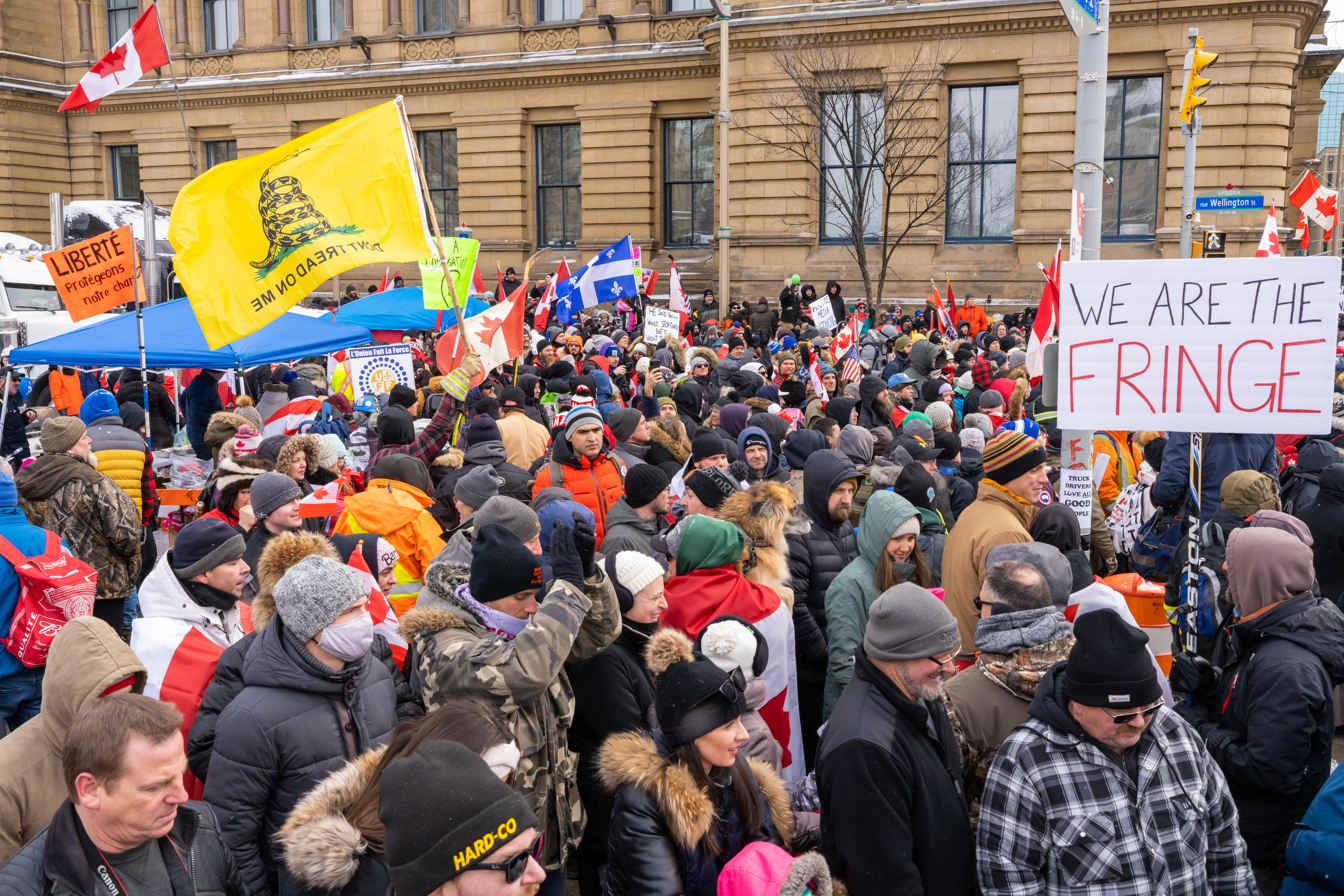
A large Gadsden flag and a large sign with the words "We are the fringe" are seen in a crowd in Ottawa on February 12, 2022. Justin Trudeau had called the convoy protesters a "fringe minority."

Ottawa's police chief, Peter Sloly, described a "significant element" of American involvement in the organization and funding of the convoys. Some of the donors participating in the protest's GoFundMe campaign were from the United States, and many used false names or remained anonymous. CBC News and The New York Times described the protests as a "cause célèbre" for the American right. The convoys and protests were widely praised and promoted by American conservative political figures, who have been accused of propagating exaggerated claims about the protest, or making unfounded claims about the roles and actions of Canadian authorities and politicians with respect to the protest. The protest was endorsed by Trump, who, during his first presidency, regularly clashed with Trudeau over policy differences. In response to the convoy, Trump referred to Trudeau as a "far-left lunatic" who "has destroyed Canada", and invited protesters to organize on Truth Social, his social network. Some commentators, for example, have called the Freedom Convoy an example of Canadian Trumpism.

Mark Carney, former Governor of the Bank of Canada and future prime minister, strongly criticized the foreign involvement in "the sedition in Ottawa," describing donors as "foreign funders of an insurrection" who had "interfered in our domestic affairs."

==== Fundraising ====
Fundraising started on January 14, 2022, through the crowdsourced fundraising platform GoFundMe. Listed as organizers were Tamara Lich, secretary of the western separatist Maverick Party, and B. J. Dichter, a 2015 federal Conservative Party candidate now associated with the People's Party of Canada. The Maverick Party has denied involvement in the convoy and said it was not the recipient of any funds raised.

The convoy's GoFundMe raised over CA$5 million by January 25. On January 24, GoFundMe stated funds raised would not be released until the fundraising organizers could demonstrate how the funds would be properly distributed. On January 27, GoFundMe released the initial CA$1 million of the funds after the organizers had provided a distribution plan.

On February 2, GoFundMe flagged the fundraiser for review and paused donations, saying it was investigating to ensure the fundraiser was in compliance with the platform's terms of service. The fundraiser had raised CA$10,096,500 from approximately 120,000 donors. On February 3, the Canadian House of Commons Standing Committee on Public Safety and National Security (SECU) called on GoFundMe officials to testify before it, to respond to concerns about the origin of the funds raised and to ensure they would not be used to "promote extremism". Members of Parliament also called on the Financial Transactions and Reports Analysis Centre of Canada (FINTRAC), Canada's financial intelligence agency, to appear before the committee. CBC News reported that a third of the donations were anonymous or used false names for the publicly visible part of the campaign, attempting to prevent their doxxing, and that commenters on the fundraiser claimed to be from the United States, United Kingdom, and other countries.

On February 4, GoFundMe removed the campaign citing violations of its rules against violence and harassment.

A convoy fundraiser on the fundraising website GiveSendGo, launched after the GoFundMe removal, attracted over $8.2 million as of February 10.

The Attorney General of Ontario sought and was granted an Ontario Superior Court of Justice court order under Section 490.8 of the Criminal Code of Canada against GiveSendGo, to freeze the funds collected from two campaigns, "Freedom Convoy 2022"—US$8.4 million and "Adopt-a-Trucker"—over $686,000, and prohibit their distribution. The court order binds "any and all parties with possession or control over these donations". The Canadian House of Commons Standing Committee on Finance (FINA) voted on February 10 to include a study of the "rise of ideologically motivated extremism". The FINA Committee invited GiveSendGo to testify.

By February 19, at least 76 bank accounts linked to the protests totalling CA$3.2 million were frozen under the Emergencies Act. Most accounts had been unfrozen by February 23.

The RCMP stated that it has not shared donor lists with financial institutions, only the names of those who were "influencers in the illegal protest in Ottawa, and owners and/or drivers of vehicles who did not want to leave the area impacted by the protest."

In response to the efforts taken to block protestors from accessing funds via GoFundMe and other methods, reports surfaced of Bitcoin being used as an alternative source for fundraising. Individual protestors have been reported as receiving bitcoin, sometimes as much as US$8,000 equivalent. Of the protestors and the new interest in bitcoin among average Canadians, the journalist stated, "...institutions can be directed to shut off financial access to enemies of the state. This has traditionally been 'rogue' nations and terrorist outfits, but Canada decided to expand this net to include the hundreds of thousands of normal Canadians who oppose government lockdowns and mandates."

An Ontario Superior Court judge extended the freeze on funds until at least March 9, as of February 28.

==== Donor list hacked ====
On February 13, 2022, the GiveSendGo website was hacked and its data on donations was released to journalists and researchers through Distributed Denial of Secrets. Four days later, it was revealed that the hacker who had claimed credit, Aubrey Cottle, had been threatened with murder. In the meantime, GiveSendGo had contacted the Federal Bureau of Investigation to see if he could be prosecuted. Of the 92,845 donations, 55.7 per cent of donors were from the United States, and 39 per cent from Canada. Many of the American donors' names correspond to the names of Donald Trump donors. The hack also revealed that one $90,000 donation allegedly came from American software billionaire Thomas Siebel. Some members of the Ontario Provincial Police were revealed to have donated to the convoy on GiveSendGo, prompting the OPP to launch an internal conduct investigation.

The American publication Politico reported that American right-wing commentators Dan Bongino and Ben Shapiro were among those directing support to the Canadian movement's crowdfunding websites. Based on research by the Institute for Strategic Dialogue, from January 28 to February 5, a link to the original Freedom Convoy GoFundMe campaign was posted at least two dozen times on 4chan. According to Politico, white supremacist channels on Telegram also repeatedly shared the link.

Once the Emergencies Act had been invoked, all crowdfunding platforms or payment providers hosting fundraising related to the convoy were required to register with the Financial Transactions and Reports Analysis Centre of Canada. Banks were given the power to freeze accounts of those suspected to be involved in the blockades.

On March 3, GoFundMe executive Juan Benitez testified to the House of Commons that 86 per cent of the donors to the original GoFundMe campaign were Canadian, and 88 per cent of the donated funds to the original campaign were from Canadians. Benitez added that GoFundMe did not identify any donors to the campaign that were affiliated with terrorist or organized crime groups.

=== Vaccine mandates and passports ===
During the COVID-19 pandemic, vaccine mandates targeting federal public servants in the Core Public Administration were announced by Prime Minister Justin Trudeau in October 2021. Several government departments and organizations faced forced administrative leaves without pay if they failed to ensure employees were vaccinated by October 30, 2021. Several of the Provinces implemented their own vaccine mandates and passports at their own discretion, separate from the Federal mandates.

In a February 11 Bloomberg News interview with Canadian Labour Minister Seamus O'Regan, Amanda Lang said that "a lot of the mandates being protested here are [not federal but] provincial mandates". O'Regan clarified that "jurisdiction is clearly laid out in our Constitution" which describes the separation of powers at federal, provincial and territorial levels. Under the Constitution Act, health is the responsibility of the provinces and territories. COVID-19-related responses, including those related to vaccinations are the responsibility of provinces and territories which provide free health services in their own jurisdictions. At the federal level, dialogues were undertaken with other Group of Seven nations, the World Health Organization, and the International Civil Aviation Organization regarding passports—"reliable and secure proof of vaccination credentials". Regulations regarding international borders are reciprocal; they are enacted and enforced by both countries which share the border, involving federal agencies including Transport Canada, and in the United States, Homeland Security and CDC.

For example, some provincial and territorial governments imposed "tougher lockdowns" to attempt to slow the spread of Covid-19.

==== Vaccination requirements for US–Canada cross-border travel ====
These new United States Department of Homeland Security regulations, released in October 2021, were regarding cross-border travel between Canada and the United States and were based on guidance from the Centers for Disease Control and Prevention. To prevent supply chain disruptions, the DHS allowed for a window of four months—until January 22, 2022—for Canadian truckers to get fully vaccinated against COVID-19. On November 19, 2021, the Public Health Agency of Canada announced upcoming adjustments to Canada's border measures. This would include the requirement for essential service providers, including truck drivers, to be fully vaccinated after January 15, 2022. The announcement clarified that unvaccinated or partially vaccinated foreign national truck drivers would be prohibited from entering Canada after that date. Unvaccinated Canadian truck drivers could enter Canada but would have to quarantine for two weeks. According to the Canadian Press and CBC, as of January 22, the mandates were estimated to harm an estimated 26,000 unvaccinated truckers of the 160,000 truck drivers who regularly cross the border in both the United States and Canada. When asked in the House of Commons to produce data linking truckers to COVID-19 infections in Canada, neither the minister of health Jean-Yves Duclos nor the chief public health officer Theresa Tam were able to do so.

An October 21, 2021, federal briefing said that the provinces and territories—who hold all of the vaccination information—are responsible for providing the vaccine passport that Canadians needed to travel internationally, using "existing provincial proof of vaccination systems". By 2022, all provinces and territories had "vaccine passports with the QR code that meets the recommended Canadian standard for domestic and international travel". There is no federal mandate for COVID-19 vaccines in Canada. With healthcare capacity spread "too thin" during the "rising fifth wave driven by the Omicron variant" in early January 2022, federal Health Minister Jean-Yves Duclos's suggestion of mandatory COVID-19 vaccines was rejected by Alberta Premier Jason Kenney, whose government had removed the power of mandatory vaccination from the province's Public Health Act, to ensure there could not be a vaccine mandate.

Since October 29, proof of vaccination has been mandatory for employees of federal public services and federally-regulated industries including banking. By early January, in these public sectors, those "without proof, or an exemption on medical or religious grounds, has been put on unpaid leave". Since the end of October, Canadians who wish to travel domestically on cruise ships or by VIA Rail trains have been required to prove they are fully vaccinated or have a negative COVID-19 test.

The January 15 enforcement of the vaccination requirement applies to truckers who are entering Canada at international border crossings. Since January 15, unvaccinated American cross-border truckers have been denied entry into Canada. Canadian truckers who are not fully vaccinated "have to show proof of a negative PCR test collected within 72 hours of arriving at the border"; they also "need to quarantine after arrival".

Unvaccinated Canadian truckers can still work in Canada, unless their individual employer requires vaccination. As of January 5, the federal government had announced plans for a vaccine mandate for federally-regulated domestic fleets that cross provincial borders. At that time, no final date was set for those rules.

A widely-shared January 12 miscommunication sent to the media from a Canada Border Services Agency spokesperson, that erroneously announced that the anticipated January 15 cross-border trucker vaccine mandate would not come into effect, was immediately retracted as an error. The "botched messaging" created "chaos and confusion."

A reciprocal vaccination requirement for the cross-border trucking industry has been in place since January 22, when the United States enforced theirs, affecting unvaccinated American truckers returning to the United States. Unvaccinated Canadian truckers are denied entry to the United States. In a February 11 update, federal Health Minister Jean-Yves Duclos alongside Dr. Tam, said that the worst was behind us, most new cases were community-driven, and cross-border restrictions were less effective. Duclos announced an update on health restrictions in the following week.

Of the total number of 160,000 licensed truck drivers who serve cross-border routes, 120,000 are Canadian and 40,000 are American. Of the 120,000 Canadian truckers, Canadian Trucking Alliance estimates that 85 per cent are already vaccinated against COVID-19, and that "as many as 12,000 to 16,000" Canadian truckers may not be able to work those cross-border routes because they are unvaccinated. In total, including the potential American cross-border truckers, these mandates could result in 26,000 of the 160,000 drivers in both countries who have been regularly running cross-border routes, losing that privilege.

== Convoy to Ottawa ==
The first convoy departed Prince Rupert on January 22, arriving in Prince George in the evening. The following day, another convoy left from Delta with supporters gathering along Highway 1, the Trans-Canada Highway.

On January 24, a convoy drove through Regina, Saskatchewan, and was greeted by supporters. According to police in Regina, about 1,200 vehicles reached the city. On January 25, another convoy passed through Kenora, Ontario, where Ontario Provincial Police (OPP) in contact with the convoy stated that 200–300 vehicles would be passing through Kenora. The convoys consisted of three main routes across Canada, which would converge for the Ottawa protest on the weekend. The Ottawa Police Service estimated up to 2,000 demonstrators in the city on the weekend.

As of January 26, the OPP estimated approximately 400 vehicles had entered Ontario from the Manitoba border as part of the eastbound convoy. The Kingston Police estimated approximately 300 vehicles (17 full tractor-trailers, 104 tractors without trailers, 424 passenger vehicles and six RVs) to go through Kingston.

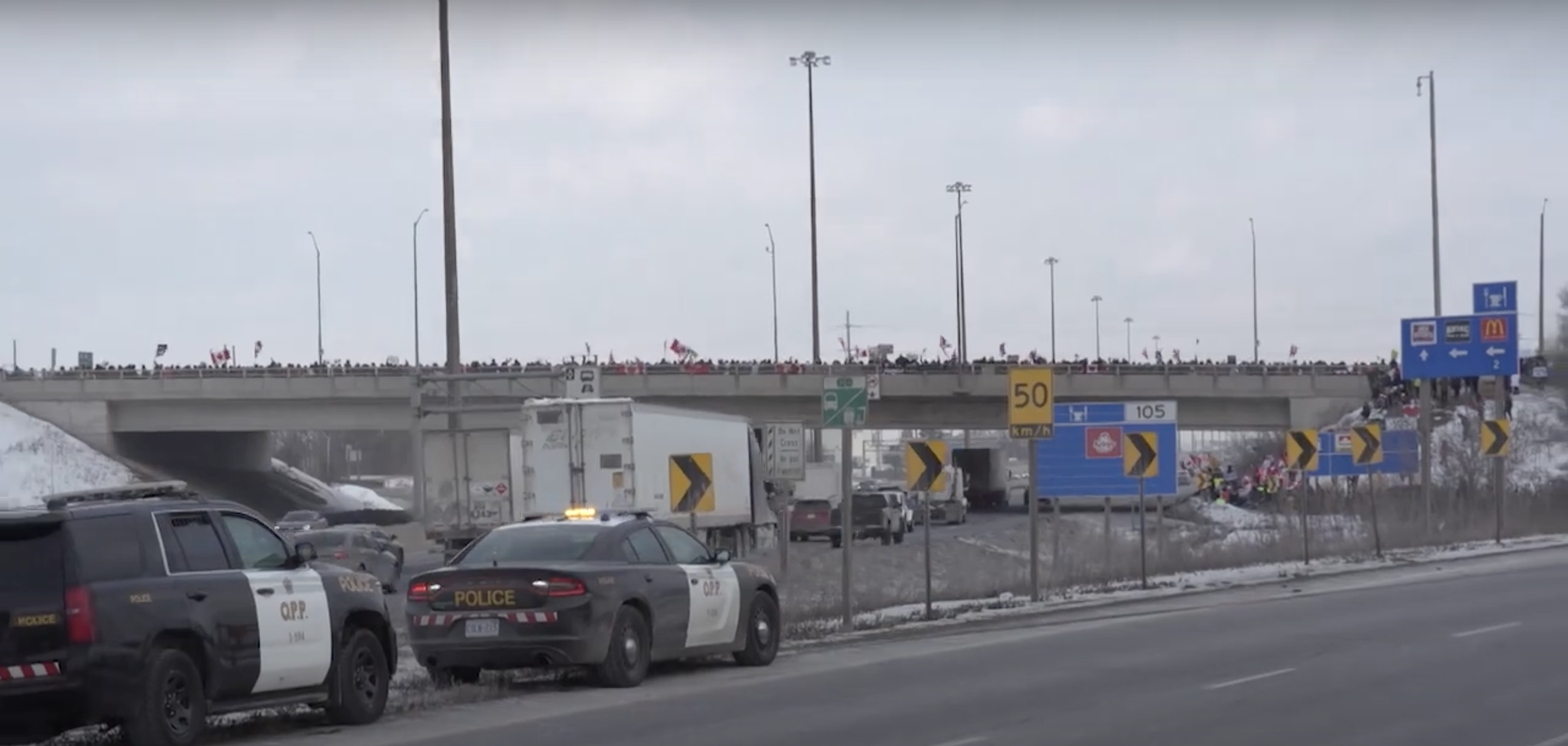
Part of the convoy moving through Halton Region in Ontario.

On January 27, David Akin, a reporter for Global News, tweeted that a convoy that had arrived that day in Thunder Bay from Winnipeg consisted of 113 commercial vehicles and 276 personal vehicles, citing the OPP. Winter weather closed a portion of Highway 17, (the main route of the Trans-Canada) in northern Ontario, causing the eastbound convoy to be divided. Some of the truckers continued on to Sault Ste. Marie, while others diverted to Highway 11 (a northern branch of the TCH) and drove toward Cochrane. Also on January 27, a fatal crash occurred near Chatham, Ontario. OPP officers later identified the convoy movement as a contributing factor to the incident.

Truckers from the Maritime provinces planned to meet in Moncton before departing for Ottawa. On the morning of January 27, supporters gathered in Enfield, Nova Scotia, where fireworks were set off as 10 to 15 trucks departed for the New Brunswick border. RCMP in PEI reported that approximately 70 trucks and supporters' vehicles crossed the Confederation Bridge into New Brunswick, but that most immediately turned around and returned to the island. About 24 trucks reportedly passed through Fredericton in the afternoon, bound for Ottawa. On January 27, one convoy group passed through the Greater Toronto Area. Hundreds of protesters gathered at highway overpasses in support of the convoy.

On January 28, a convoy was seen passing through Quebec. About 600 convoy vehicles were expected to stay the night in Arnprior before heading to Parliament Hill the following morning.

On January 28, the province of Nova Scotia banned gatherings along highways, specifically on the Trans-Canada (Highway 104) between the Nova Scotia and New Brunswick border, in relation to protests related to the freedom convoy.

== Ottawa protest ==
=== Peak size of Parliament Hill demonstration ===
According to the Ottawa Police Service, crowd estimates ranged from 5,000 to 18,000 protesters on January 29, dwindling to approximately 3,000 demonstrators the following day. By February 1, they estimated as few as 250 protesters remained.

On February 9, CNN's Daniel Dale fact-checked numerous claims about the protests in general. Dale echoed the previous claims by police, adding that there was also an estimated 200 vehicles from the Atlantic provinces.

Some Facebook posts claimed as many as 50,000 trucks would be participating in the convoys. On his blog, Fox News commentator Sean Hannity reported that the convoy was made up of 10,000 heavy trucks, and Joe Warmington of the Toronto Sun reported that the event may set a Guinness World Record for the largest truck convoy on record. These claims were grossly exaggerated. Claims that the truck convoy "made the Guinness Book of World Records" are also false; the current record is 480 trucks, set in Cairo, Egypt in 2020, and the Freedom Convoy did not submit an application for an attempt at setting a new record.

=== Incidents and community impact in Ottawa ===
Various images of specific acts during January 29 received wide condemnation. Images of a Canadian flag marked with a swastika were seen, as was a Confederate flag. Key organizers denounced symbols of hate with one stating, "we are going to overcome this through love and light, not hate and division." Additionally, Tamara Lich, organizer of the national convoy stated, "If you see participants along the way that are misbehaving, acting aggressively in any way or inciting any type of violence or hatred, please take down the truck number and their licence plate number so that we can forward that to the police." Some protesters were seen drinking and dancing on the Tomb of the Unknown Soldier at the National War Memorial. Chief of the Defence Staff Gen. Wayne Eyre described it as a desecration, and the Royal Canadian Legion condemned the actions. A statue of cancer fundraiser Terry Fox was decorated with an upside-down Canadian flag and a protest sign. The Terry Fox Foundation said Fox "believed in science and gave his life to help others". The statue was cleaned later by other protesters.

A local soup kitchen, the Shepherds of Good Hope, alleged that some protestors were harassing the shelter for free food. The kitchen alleged in a tweet that one resident was assaulted, and a security guard faced racial slurs and threats, though no charges were reported against these protestors. Its press release said trucks were towed after blocking its ambulance drop-off zone for around half a day.

Ottawa residents described being afraid and feeling trapped in their homes as the trucks spilled over from the Parliament Hill area into surrounding residential areas. Some Ottawa businesses near Parliament Hill closed around the time of the convoy's arrival out of an abundance of caution, while others closed later after staff reported being harassed or attacked by convoy participants for wearing a mask, or because of their race. Ottawa police reported that they had received hundreds of calls for service from residents, made some arrests, and in partnership with by-law services had issued tickets to convoy participants for actions impacting residents such as excessive honking and use of fireworks, in addition to tickets for driving infractions. “Evidence provided to the commission showed the noise levels outside their homes reached 100 decibels at times — about as loud as a lawn mower”, enough to cause a local resident to later testify at the Emergencies Act Inquiry that she had experienced an "assault on my hearing”.

=== Ottawa protests and entrenchment ===
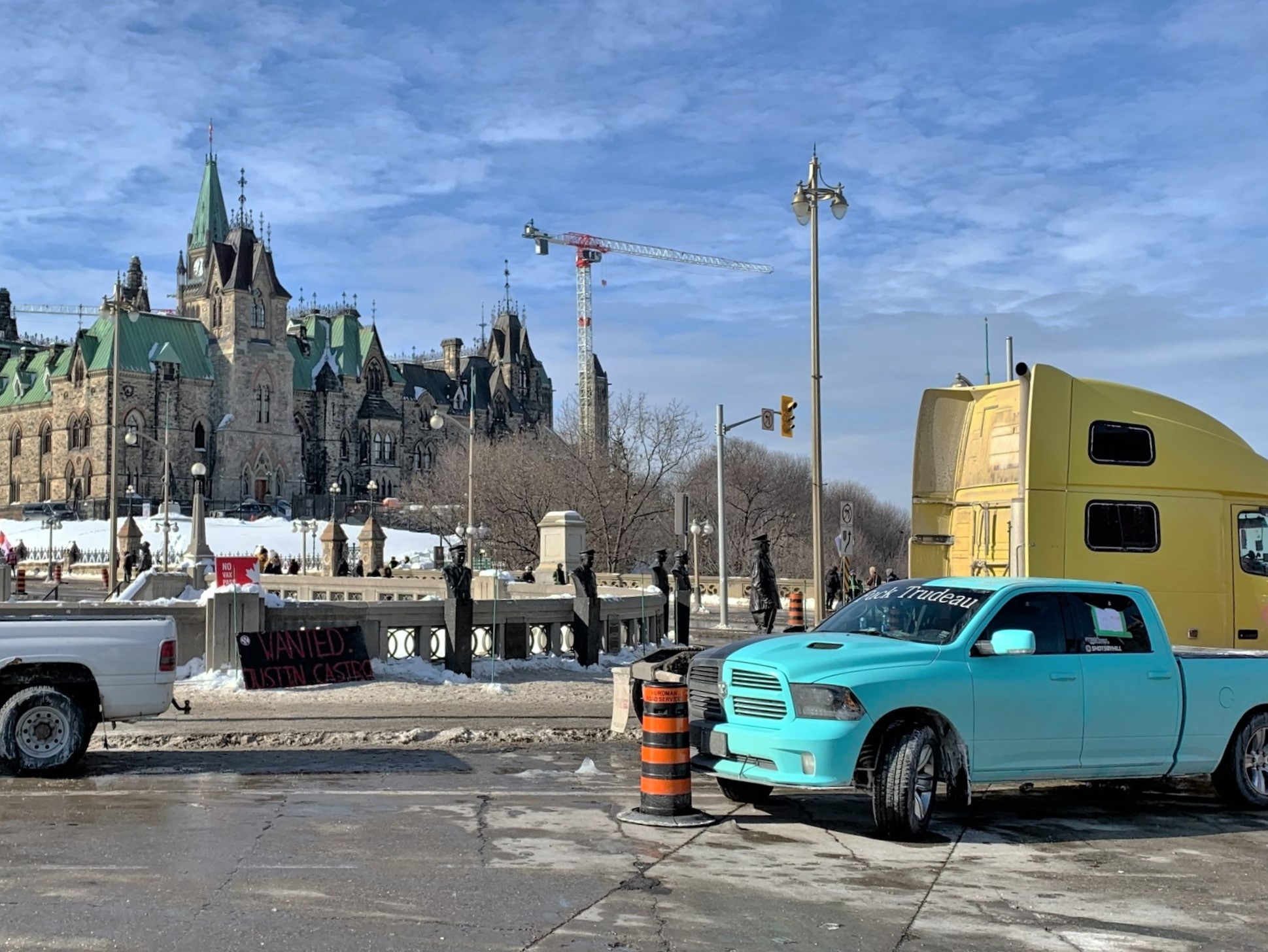
Protester vehicles lined up in the periphery of the National War Memorial on January 31

The January 29 protest had a party-like atmosphere, with some handing out coffee and cookies and consuming beer and marijuana. Protesters barbecued food, played hockey, and set up bouncy castles for their children to play in. Ottawa Police reported de-escalating multiple "high-risk situations," but made no arrests.

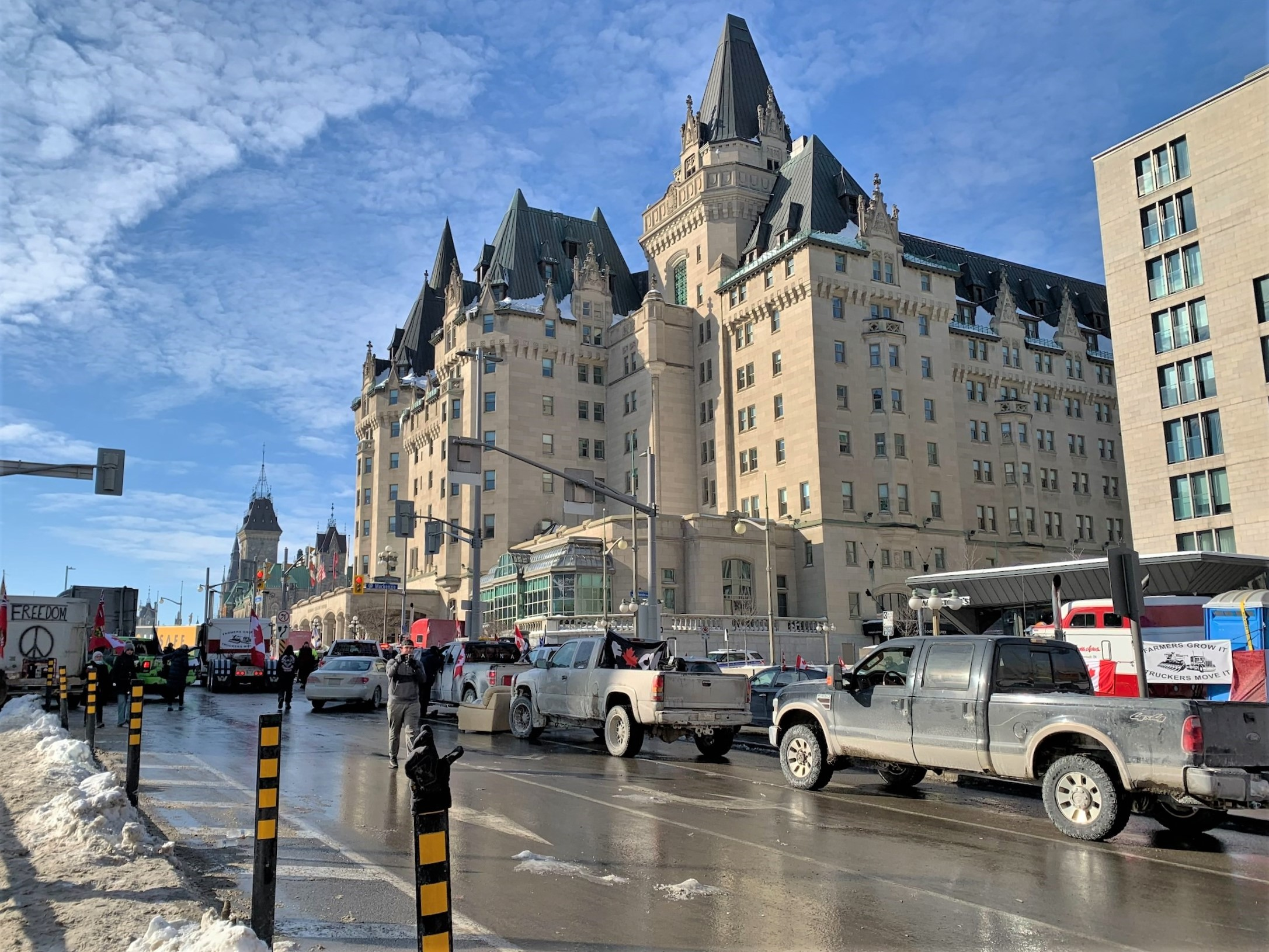
Rideau Street in Ottawa on January 31

During this first weekend of protest in Ottawa, the city's COVID-19 wastewater signal indicated a sharp increase in COVID-19 cases, suggesting a link between the gathering of protesters and the spread of COVID-19.

A January 31 press conference was held at an undisclosed location, open only to invited right-wing outlets.

The House of Commons resumed on January 31, after the holiday break.

On January 31, Ottawa Paramedics announced that protesters had thrown rocks at an ambulance over the course of the weekend and called paramedics racial slurs. Paramedics had treated 19 people over the course of the weekend, mostly due to alcohol-related intoxication.

Healthcare workers and patients reported that they had difficulty getting to hospitals because of jammed bridges. Some healthcare workers had to stay in hotel rooms near the hospitals. Many staff members from the Children's Hospital of Eastern Ontario (CHEO) felt besieged, and expressed concerns about swastikas and other symbols of hate displayed by protesters.

On the afternoon of January 31, Sloly said that "The situation of the demonstration has scaled down over the last 12 hours" and that "We want that trend to continue until this demonstration comes to a complete end. I cannot guarantee you that right now but I can guarantee that every effort at negotiation, coordination, de-escalation, has continued throughout the last four days and will continue until the complete end of this demonstration."

On February 1, large downtown Ottawa amenities like the Rideau Centre, Ottawa City Hall, and the National Arts Centre continued to stay closed due to security concerns. Ottawa police set up a hotline for hate-motivated crimes to be reported. On the night of February 1, Ottawa Police said that about 250 protesters remained around and on Parliament Hill.

Ottawa residents reported numerous incidents in which convoy protesters physically assaulted them, or threatened rape or death for wearing masks. A protester threatened to stab a 16-year-old employee at a Tim Hortons in Centretown, after being informed that patrons must wear masks. Convoy supporters physically attacked an Ottawa pastor because he was wearing a mask, and they routinely urinated on his church. The Ottawa People’s Commission documented many alleged hate crimes, including an incident in which an Ottawa resident of Asian ancestry was beaten by three convoy supporters after being asked to perform a dragon dance. In a separate incident, two convoy supporters yelled anti-Asian slurs at an employee of a downtown ice cream shop who was wearing a mask while walking to work; the two men then threw the employee to the ground. Because of safety concerns, the shop closed for an extended period of time.

A video circulated showing protesters appropriating First Nations drumming while dancing, drinking beer, and chanting "yabba dabba doo" and "fuck Trudeau". Senator and Mi'kmaq leader Brian Francis tweeted: "I am disgusted, appalled and saddened. This blatant act of racism must be vehemently condemned by all. Drumming is sacred to all First Nations. Our ways of life should never be mimicked, mocked and appropriated for political or other gain." The Algonquins of Pikwàkanagàn First Nation, whose traditional unceded territory includes the city of Ottawa, issued a statement condemning protesters who held an Indigenous pipe ceremony and set up a tepee in the city's Confederation Park without permission of the First Nations on February 2.

On February 2, organizers of the protest said that they would not leave Ottawa until governments across Canada "end all mandates associated with COVID-19", and would stay "as long as it takes for freedom to be restored".

On February 3, the protesters started building a wooden structure in Confederation Park and gathering fuel supplies. Social media reports suggested that the structure was intended to serve as a community kitchen for the protesters.

On February 6, Ottawa Police promised to increase enforcement on protesters, including handing out tickets and arresting anyone who attempts to bring material aid, such as fuel, to protesters. A state of emergency was declared by the City of Ottawa on the same day. In a statement, the city said that its declaration "reflects the serious danger and threat to the safety and security of residents posed by the demonstrations and highlights the need for support from other jurisdictions and levels of government".

On the evening of February 6, Police performed a raid on a stockpile hub of supplies for protesters, seizing fuel and making two arrests for mischief.

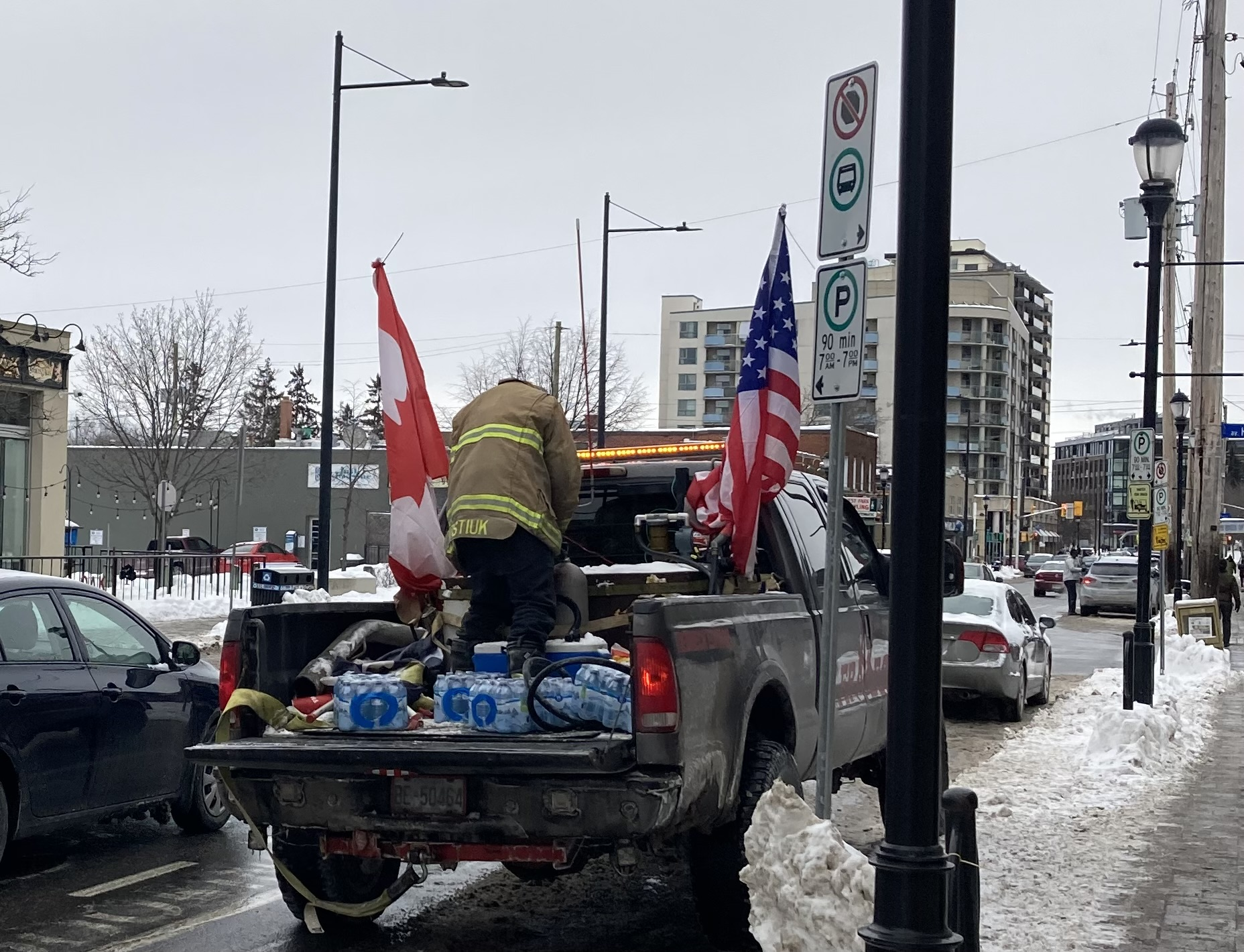
A protester with Canadian and American flags loads up on supplies in Ottawa

An emergency debate of the House of Commons was held on the night of February 7, at the request of NDP leader Jagmeet Singh. Trudeau stated that the convoy is "trying to blockade our economy, our democracy and our fellow citizens' daily lives. It has to stop." Transport minister Omar Alghabra used the debate to encourage Ontario Premier Doug Ford to use regulatory powers to discourage the occupation, such as suspending commercial licences or insurance of the truckers.

It was reported on February 7 that the Children's Aid Society (CAS) was working with the OPS to ensure the welfare and safety of the children who were living in about a quarter of the 418 convoy trucks, according to Ottawa Police Deputy Chief Steve Bell. Concerns were raised about sanitation, noise levels, and fumes. According to the Canadian Press, there were about 100 children living in the convoy trucks on February 8. Bell said that the presence of children is an "important factor" complicating a "challenging operation".

By February 9, people with police, military, and survivalist experience had helped the protesters set up camp with tents and wooden kitchens, creating a supply chain to ensure continued protest. The logistic centre at the Raymond Chabot Grant Thornton Park (RCGP) baseball stadium included trailers of food, tents, toilets, and distribution points for gasoline and propane. The Freedom Convoy's head of security and spokesman was Daniel Bulford, a former RCMP officer who served on Prime Minister Trudeau's security detail. Police on Guard, a Facebook group of about 100 police officers, mainly retired, and 50 soldiers endorse the convoy. Two serving members of the Joint Task Force 2 (JTF2) are under investigation for alleged involvement.

On February 10, leaders of the Freedom Convoy declared February 11 an "Orange Shirt Day" and called for student walkouts to end COVID-19 restrictions in schools. Indigenous leaders condemned this announcement as misappropriation.

On Day 15, February 11, Doug Ford declared a state of emergency in Ontario as protesters continued to occupy the Ambassador Bridge, while Ford referred to the situation in downtown Ottawa as a "siege". By February 12, police had cleared trucks from the bridge, with busloads of police, some with heavy weapons, and an armoured vehicle.

By day 14, February 10, the newest tactic was "convoy circles". Ottawa-Centre MPP Joel Harden noted that a "convoy organizer" had been encouraging protesters to form them around public schools in Ottawa. A group of about 60 convoy vehicles headed to the Ottawa Macdonald–Cartier International Airport at 8 am, slow-circling it, honking, and blocking traffic until about 10 am, then returning to their Coventry Road protest encampment. Chief Stoly said many "vexatious calls" from the United States to 9-1-1 flooded the system and endangered lives.

Mayor Watson sent a letter to Tamara Lich and Keith Wilson to negotiate terms with protesters. On February 13 afternoon, Mayor Watson's Office said that they had reached an agreement with protesters that they would limit the protest perimeter to "Wellington Street, between Elgin Street and the Sir John A. Macdonald Parkway" to "reduce pressure on residents and businesses", and truckers would leave residential neighbourhoods.

On February 15, Ottawa Police Chief Peter Sloly resigned after weeks of criticism aimed at his handling of the protests.

Demonstrating a misunderstanding of the functions of the Canadian monarchy, many involved in the protest called and emailed the office of the Governor General to pressure her into unconstitutionally dismissing Trudeau or dissolving Parliament, leading to Simon making a rare public statement on the role of the Governor General. Constitutional scholar Philippe Lagassé pointed to that as "evidence of a recent trend in protest movements", saying, "it has become routine in Canadian politics to write a letter to the Queen, Governor General, or a lieutenant governor asking them to exercise their powers in some way, contrary to constitutional conventions. This is political theatre, no more."

=== After clearance ===
Organizers Chris Barber and Tamara Lich were each arrested on February 17. Lich's bank account had previously been frozen. Organizer Pat King was later arrested on February 18, and an Alberta woman in the convoy, Kerry Komix, offered $50,000 for bail. The Crown lawyer noted that allowing her to act as surety was like "one thief being tasked to supervise another burglar." Komix was listed as the co-creator of a crypto donation platform. King was denied bail on February 25, after the presiding Justice ruled that Komix was not suitable surety, and expressed concern that King had a high risk of reoffending. On February 28, a convoy leader from High Prairie, Alberta named Tyson 'Freedom George' Billings was denied bail.

Various nearby rural areas became new encampments for the protesters. More than fifty trucks moved to a truck stop in Champlain Township, near Vankleek Hill, immediately following the Ottawa clearance. In interviews, those at the site mention plans to continue the convoy, with no specifics. Sites have also opened in Trent Lakes and near Kinburn, in West Carleton-March Ward. (Protesters originally intended to use the Arnprior Airport.) As of February 17, 2022, a farm in Russell Township, outside of Embrun, continued to be used by truckers as a convoy base camp. The Ontario Provincial Police is monitoring the site. As of February 20, the site near Kinburn remained active. Prime Minister Trudeau has commented, saying the groups were showing a "desire or an openness" to return. "A few days" before February 21, a convoy from Fort McMurray, Alberta was turned away at the Manitoba border. At a special meeting of the Ottawa Police Services Board on February 24, Acting Chief Bell feels the Highway Traffic Act and other laws would be enough to manage a possible return, despite removal of the Emergencies Act.

On March 5, a human chain was formed along Wellington Street, as a "freedom protest." Some later relocated to the Ottawa-Carleton Detention Centre, demanding Lich and King be released. Ottawa residents protested the delayed police response.

On March 26, a convoy demonstration from Quebec made what police called a "symbolic passage" through downtown Ottawa on its way to Vankleek Hill.

== Major blockades ==
=== Alberta–Montana ===
On January 29, the date that the Freedom Convoy arrived in Ottawa, a group of truckers blockaded the Sweetgrass–Coutts Border Crossing—one of the busiest ports of entry west of the Great Lakes which connects Sweet Grass, Montana, via US Interstate 15 with the village of Coutts, Alberta, via Alberta Highway 4. The United States Department of Agriculture's Food Safety and Inspection Service is located at this crossing, making it the principal port of entry for Alberta's large meat industry, and one of three main points where all meat products from the rest of western Canada cross the border, according to the Canadian Meat Council. The group of around 100 protesters demanded an end to all COVID-19 restrictions. The blockade, which extended about 2 km (1.2 mi) into Canada, also blocked public and emergency vehicle access to the village of Coutts, prompting condemnation from the town's mayor. Alberta Premier Jason Kenney called the blockade illegal, and threatened that protesters would face penalties under the province's Critical Infrastructure Defence Act.

Alberta RCMP initially negotiated with protesters for a peaceful end to the blockade, and protesters agreed to release about 50 vehicles trapped on Highway 4 and US Interstate 15. On February 1, police ceased negotiations and demanded that protesters leave the highway, and set up a police roadblock on Highway 4 about 20 km (12 mi) north of Coutts. A few vehicles left, most remained, and several incidents of violence against police and civilians were reported, including protesters ramming RCMP vehicles. Some vehicles wanting to join the blockade evaded the RCMP roadblock by driving through a ditch and drove south in the highway's northbound lanes, resulting in a head-on collision. The two men involved in the collision were taken to hospital.

On February 12, due to ongoing protests, the Canada Border Services Agency suspended all travel at the Coutts border crossing.

On February 14, RCMP stepped in and arrested 13 people, seizing long guns, handguns, body armour, a large amount of ammunition and high capacity magazines. Four men were subsequently charged with conspiracy to murder RCMP officers.

The border crossing was reopened on February 15.

=== Ontario–Michigan ===
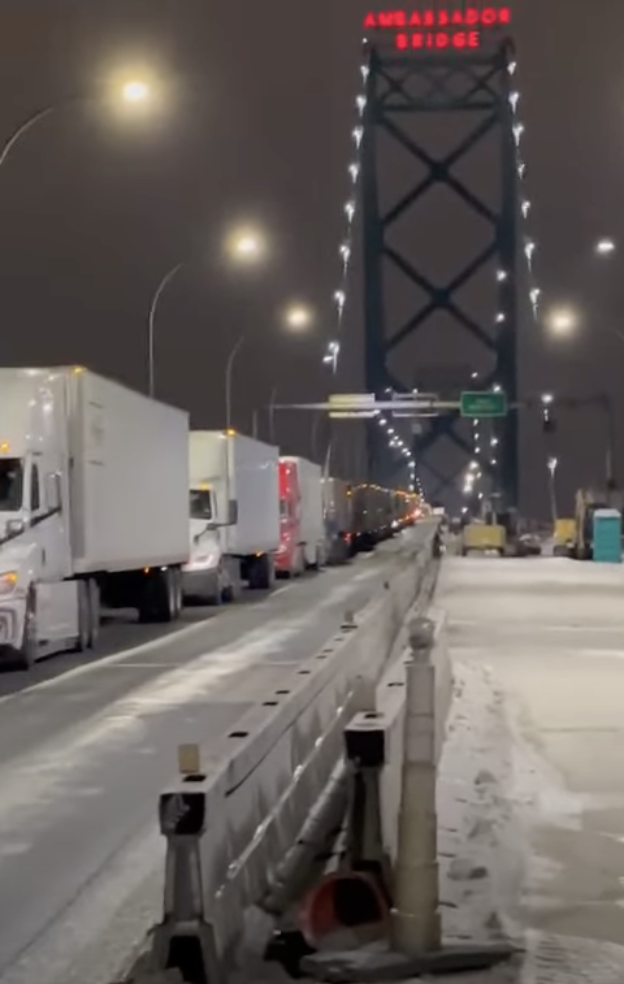
Trucks unable to cross the border, lined up on the Ambassador Bridge February 8, 2022

Protesters at the Ambassador Bridge, connecting Windsor, Ontario, with Detroit, Michigan, and one of the busiest international border crossings in North America, blockaded the border crossing on February 7. On the evening of February 7, movement at the bridge came to a complete halt. The blockade continued into February 8. On the morning of February 8, officials declared the bridge reopened, but the blockade resumed, pushing trips to the Blue Water Bridge connecting Sarnia and Port Huron.

Supply shortages caused by the blockade led to work shortages at Ford Motor Company's assembly plants in Oakville and in Lansing, Michigan, and shut down its Windsor plant. Parts manufacturers for Chrysler were also shut down, and on February 10, Toyota revealed that its three Ontario plants could not produce vehicles for the rest of the week. The Bank of Canada warned that the blockade could have a "measurable impact" on the Canadian economy.

The Windsor-Essex Children's Aid Society condemned protesters for using children as human shields during the protest.

On the morning of February 12, aided by Ontario Provincial Police and the RCMP, Windsor Police began to clear out the blockade using new powers. Despite the heavy police presence, by the end of the day on February 12, most protesters remained, although had been pushed much further from the bridge. Police arrested two individuals, towed seven vehicles and issued eleven tickets.

On the morning of February 13, joint police forces took control of the area and began to make arrests. In the late evening of February 13, the Ambassador Bridge had fully reopened. 42 arrests were made in total, with 37 vehicles seized.

Windsor Police requested resources from other police organizations on February 9, 2022, after the number of participants climbed to around 100, with between 50 and 70 vehicles. Windsor, Ontario, where the convoy blocked the Ambassador Bridge, intervened in an action by automobile manufacturers in Superior Court for an injunction. Mayor Drew Dilkens declared his intention to clear the bridge with the assistance of police reinforcements. An injunction was granted February 11 effective 7 pm. A deadline of midnight was set. Local police were to be employed to clear the bridge.

At 9 am, police from several Ontario cities, including London, Ontario, were at the bridge in force together with buses and tow trucks, an armored personnel carrier, and a sniper. The Windsor police announced via Twitter that enforcement had begun. Some protestors, after discussion with police, had peacefully departed with their vehicles. The police, from Windsor and 5 other jurisdictions, succeeded in clearing the area of tractor-trailers, but a large crowd gathered in the area; the crowd was peaceful, even festive, singing the national anthem, but the bridge remained closed. The police maintained a strong presence in the area, but did not attempt mass arrests. In the evening one arrest was made.

The protesters were completely cleared by February 13 at approximately 8 a.m, although the border was not immediately opened. The bridge re-opened in the evening with 25 to 30 people arrested and 12 small vehicles seized. There was a substantial police presence and Jersey barriers were installed to keep the three-mile long access road to the bridge open. On February 16, police intercepted a convoy of six or seven trucks 250 kilometres (160 mi) away from Windsor – heading towards the city after leaving Ottawa.

== Participants and response ==
=== Organizers ===
Some of the key individual organizers for the convoy included, James Bauder, Romana Didulo, Patrick "Pat" King, Tamara Lich, Jason LaFace, Benjamin Dichter, and Dave Steenburg. In the lead-up to the planned arrival in Ottawa, it was reported on January 25 that far-right and white supremacist groups were hoping for violence on Parliament Hill akin to the 2021 United States Capitol attack. This has caused organizer Tamara Lich to address convoy members and denounce political violence, saying that protesters should "hold a peaceful protest" instead. Organizers and leaders of the convoy condemned extremist groups, and asked that participants report lawbreakers to the police. They also stated that any extremists found would be "removed" from the convoy. Despite this, some protesters were photographed with Confederate flags and other flags with Nazi symbols at the rally. The Globe and Mail noted that "signs comparing vaccine mandates to the persecution of Jewish people by the Nazis remained" until the clearance. On January 28, Prime Minister Justin Trudeau expressed concern that a small group of protesters were going to be posing a threat during the weekend.

=== Counter-protests ===
Counter-protests in favour of public health measures were held throughout the convoy's duration. In Ottawa, with protestors in the parliament area spilling into residential neighbourhoods nearby, lawsuits and injunction requests were filed by residents to silence the trucks that were honking their horns at all hours.

Counter-protests were held in several cities on February 5. Counter-protestors forced a convoy of vehicles to split-up in Vancouver after blocking the roadway by standing on foot or with a bicycle on Terminal Avenue. There were few side streets or exit options after the trucks travelled more than 2 kilometres down the roadway, which required the trucks to reverse the length of Terminal Avenue in order to exit the street. Counter-protestors in Victoria spread out by the BC Legislature, to be near and far weekend convoy protestors. Some 200 people gathered in front of Ottawa City Hall to demand the end of disruptions caused by trucks downtown. People held pro-vaccination signs in Whitehorse while anti-mandate protestors passed them in vehicles.

A counter-protest organized by health care workers was planned in Toronto for February 12, but was called off when the provincial government instituted a state of emergency.

In counter-protests on February 12, thousands of people joined the "Community Solidarity March" through Ottawa to demand the end of the protests. On February 13, a group of Ottawa residents blocked the intersection of Riverside Drive and Bank Street to prevent a newly-arrived contingent of vehicles from joining the main protest. The original group of 20 grew to more than 1,000 people and successfully kettled the eastern artery of the "Blue Collar Convoy" for eight hours and were joined by groups in other neighbourhoods. The convoy vehicles left one at a time under a heavy police escort, after the vehicle owners took down their signs and flags. The standoff between Ottawa residents and the kettled convoy participants was colloquially called the 'Battle of Billings Bridge' and was commemorated a year later with an unofficial plaque installed in the location of the standoff. During the convoy occupation of Ottawa, various individuals gained public note for their counter-protesting.

The protestors' Zello push-to-talk-style voice channels were the subject of coordinated disruption from counter-protestors, including users playing the homoerotic country rock song "Ram Ranch" to "troll" participants and listeners (an effort coordinated under the hashtag "#RamRanchResistance").

=== Ottawa Police Service response ===
Ottawa Police Service faced criticism for how it responded to the convoy during the first three weeks, culminating with the resignation of Chief Peter Sloly. At a January 31 press conference, Ottawa Police Service (OPS) Chief Peter Sloly described the demonstration as "unique in nature, massive in scale, polarizing in context and dangerous in literally every other aspect of the event itself". He said that starting on January 28, there was a "traffic gridlock" which turned into "traffic chaos" over the next two days, as "thousands of vehicles, particularly heavy trucks" arrived in Ottawa. Security forces included police forces from the federal, provincial and municipal levels: the RCMP, Ontario Provincial Police (OPP), Gatineau Police, Sûreté du Québec, London Police Service, Hamilton Police Service, Peel Regional Police, Toronto Police Service, York Regional Police, and Durham Regional Police who worked with the OPS Incident Command System. OPS Chief Sloly advised people to avoid downtown Ottawa during the weekend protest, adding that "we are prepared to investigate, arrest if necessary, charge and prosecute anyone who acts violently or breaks the law in the demonstrations, or in association with the demonstrations". Chief Sloly said that since the scaling down of the demonstration on January 31, the crime prevention teams normally providing support in around the core, but who were deployed elsewhere during the height of the protests, have returned to their neighbourhoods.

By January 31, with the cost of police service per day estimated at CA$800,000 a day, the Mayor of Ottawa was considering legal action to cover costs.

Patrick McDonell, the Sergeant-at-Arms of the House of Commons and Director General of Parliamentary Protective Service (PPS) warned members of parliament about possible doxing attempts to discover the addresses of their residences in the Capital Region. The letter further warned MPs not to get involved in any demonstrations, to "go somewhere safe", and to keep all doors locked. McDonell told reporters that Canada has never been so divided—the thousands of people arriving on Parliament Hill in the trucker convoy represented a "symbol of the fatigue" that Canadians were experiencing after two years of COVID. PPS prepared for approximately 10,000 protesters; Wellington Street, which is in front of Parliament Hill was closed to most traffic; some lanes had been "designated specifically" for truckers; and others for emergency vehicles.

On January 29, the first day of protest at Parliament Hill, Prime Minister Justin Trudeau was "moved to an undisclosed location due to security concerns".

The OPS had called in reinforcements from the RCMP and the Canadian Security Intelligence Service (CSIS)—Canada's main intelligence service—and were working to identify threats in the convoy. Intelligence reports by the Integrated Terrorism Assessment Centre (ITAC), which is part of CSIS, said that some convoy supporters "advocated civil war", had "called for violence against prime minister Justin Trudeau", and said the protest should be "used as Canada's 'January 6'", referencing the January 6 United States Capitol attack. The ITAC reports, which were seen by The Guardian, warned in late January that "extremists" were "likely involved" and the "potential for violence remained real". The February 8 ITAC report raised concerns that the "online rhetoric" was "violent", and that there were "ideological extremists" who were "physically present" at "some gatherings".

As protesters headed to Ottawa on January 28, the OPP tweeted "OPP advises motorists to avoid travel on Highway 417 and Highway 416 in the Ottawa area, beginning Friday afternoon and on Saturday." They asked that emergency vehicle access be assured throughout.

On weekdays, the number of protesters somewhat declined. On the second weekend, with 500 heavy trucks and 7,000 demonstrators in the downtown core "red zone" as of Saturday evening, Sloly reported to an emergency meeting Ottawa Police Services board meeting, that even with all OPS officers on active duty and the hundreds of law-enforcement officials who came to help, he did not have the resources to end what he called the "turbulent protests". On the third weekend of February 11 and 12, there were about 4,000 or 5,000 protesters and partyers in the city's core, on Parliament Hill. Even after a state of emergency was declared by the mayor, officers were outnumbered and unable to enforce injunctions or regulations.

According to the Times, many analysts have cautioned that some convoy's leaders with military or policing backgrounds helped demonstrators strategize and plan under the guidance of people like Tom Quiggin, "proclaimed head of protective intelligence", who had formerly served as an "intelligence officer for the Canadian military, cabinet office and federal police." and has been described as "one of the country's top counter-terrorism experts." By February 10, Chief Sloly said 250 RCMP officers were sworn in and deployed to reinforce the 1,500 OPS officers.

The response of local police forces to these blockades has erred on the side of caution, with police at each site initially trying to negotiate with the protesters.

=== Integrated Command Centre response ===
Plans for the creation of the new Integrated Command Centre were in place by February 12. The Integrated Command Centre was created to help Ottawa Police Services (OPS) coordinate with Ontario Provincial Police (OPP) and RCMP when the anticipated reinforcements would arrive. As an estimated 4,000 protesters converged on Parliament Hill on February 12, the extra reinforcements requested by Chief Sloly a week earlier had not yet arrived.

Emergency Preparedness Minister Bill Blair said on February 13 that they are in constant contact with provincial and municipal authorities. Because the situation is "critical" for Canada with the "closing of our borders, the targeting on critical infrastructure, particularly our points of entry by the people behind these protests", it poses a "significant national security threat" to Canada, and we have to "end it".

On Day 19 of the protests, with Ottawa under three states of emergency invoked by the three levels of government, Chief Sloly resigned. At the February 15 Ottawa Police Board meeting, Deputy Chief Steve Bell, who was appointed Interim Chief of Police, told the board that the OPS force had not "yet received the 1,800 extra officers requested". At the height of the protests, there were about 8,000 protesters. Overnight, on February 14, there were "less than 150 people in the blockade" and approximately 360 vehicles still on the streets, in contrast to the estimated 4,000 vehicles at the end of January. The OPS had made a total of "33 arrests and charged 18 people" in the 19 day period. Canadian Police Association president, Tom Stamatakis, cautioned that with Sloly's resignation, politicians "should not 'scapegoat' him for other failures that have allowed this occupation to drag on."

On February 18, Day 22, hundreds of OPS, York, Toronto, Gatineau, Durham Region, London, Hamilton forces, the Sureté du Québec, the OPP, and the RCMP, worked on a coordinated police action in and around Parliament Hill. By late February 18 morning, CTV News and other mainstream media reporting in the red zone, showed police steadily, very slowly sandwiching groups of dozens of the remaining protesters on all sides on separate streets. There were reports of a flank of police on horseback behind those in the front lines. Families with children were seen in these final groups of protesters, with police reporting that protesters were "putting children between their operations and the protest site." The police assured that "children will be brought to a place of safety." In a CBC interview, former OPS chief Charles Bordeleau said he had never seen children used before in other protests. He said that the CAS did not have to step in. Pat King was arrested near noon. King is described as the final of three major online influencers continuing the protest to be arrested. He was later charged of mischief, counselling to commit the offence of mischief, counselling to commit the offence of disobey court order (s.127), and counselling to commit the offence of obstruct police.

By early afternoon, tactical officers began slowly entering the cabins of large rigs that had been parked in front of Parliament since the end of January. Two large campers placed by protesters to prevent large trucks blocking Sussex from moving were finally cleared early in the afternoon, with the arrest of a protester in the motor home by five officers wearing full security gear. Police allowed mainstream media close access to the frontlines of the tactical method. In the afternoon, as some of the remaining protesters accepted the inevitable, they began to clear 30 cm (0.98 ft) of snow from their trucks and trailers in preparation for their departure.

Frustrated protesters interviewed by CBC and CTV who were earlier calling "Hold the line", asked for their "voice to be heard". The last few protesters said, without evidence, that the protest was legal, citing, but misunderstanding Canadian law. CBC News on the front lines reported protesters in the red zone, who could leave, chose to stay and be arrested. There were 70 arrests and 21 vehicles were removed by mid-afternoon. CBC's senior defence writer, Murray Brewster, described the police operation as "professional, methodical, and tactical". Police did not prevent truckers or individual protesters from driving or walking away for most of the day. They may face charges later.

Police used a minimal amount of force, even late in the afternoon, as members of different forces began "squeezing" the group of protesters "even tighter" on Wellington Street in front of Parliament. They were not wearing shields or using pepper spray or tear gas, as they wanted protesters to leave, as opposed to arresting them, according to Bordeleau. As waiting long lines tow trucks, brought in by the police, replaced the heavy rigs that had been grid-locking Ottawa downtown, some of the tow trucks' company names were hidden. CBC reported that tow truck companies who had previously refused to tow protesters' vehicles, have been forced through the Emergencies Act to comply with orders. Bordeleau also said that the Emergencies Act had allowed police to set up 100 checkpoints around the city of Ottawa to prevent protester back-filling and to prevent pop-up protests. In response to those who contrasted the February 18 coordinated successful response to the OPS inaction in previous weeks, Carol Anne Meehan, an Ottawa City Councillor, said that the OPS had been severely under-resourced until the Emergencies Act was invoked.

On February 19, police began with a "hard, fast push" towards to the encampment at Parliament Hill. Due to the resistance of protesters, police wore helmets and carried batons for protection. At one point, a smoke device was released by protesters. By early afternoon, more than 140 people had been arrested and dozens of vehicles had been seized. During the question period of the OPS press conference, Chief Bell confirmed that security forces have been gathering intelligence using videos, and that they will be actively pursuing people who have been filmed. The police will actively follow up with identifications, collect evidence, seek criminal charges with sanctions that can include the financial level and licensing level.

==== Clearance ====
As of February 10, there was general agreement by government and police that vigorous efforts to clear the blockades were dangerous, possibly leading to expanded or violent reactions. A variety of options were legally possible and some, such as issuing tickets, were employed. Tow-truck drivers in several locations declined to tow trucks.

Prime Minister Justin Trudeau, on February 3, declared his reluctance to employ the military to clear the protesters, saying he had received no formal request for military assistance and added, "One has to be very, very cautious before deploying military in situations engaging Canadians," saying it's not something to "enter into lightly".

On February 11, the court injunction to clear protesters from the Ambassador Bridge, secured by the City of Windsor, went into effect at 7 pm. Prime Minister Trudeau and United States President Joe Biden met virtually to discuss the dissolution of cross-border blockades. Ontario Premier Doug Ford declared a state of emergency in the province. Heavy fines of up to $100,000 and up to a year of imprisonment were introduced for offences such as blocking or impeding the movement of goods, people, and services along critical roads and bridges in the province, including "international border crossings, 400-series highways, airports, ports, bridges and railways". Penalties include revoking personal and commercial drivers' licences.

On February 17, police massed at a staging area in Ottawa. A 12 feet (3.7 m)-high fence was constructed around the Parliament building and over 100 checkpoints limited access to the protest area. OC Transpo transit stations in the downtown were also closed.

Convoy organizers Chris Barber and Tamara Lich were arrested in separate instances, and Lich stated that her personal bank account had been frozen. Several other people were arrested after ignoring multiple orders to leave the area. Pat King, another convoy organizer, was arrested by police on February 18.

That same day, police made at least 70 arrests and towed 21 vehicles by mid-afternoon. The police operation consisted of an initial wave of horse-mounted police officers and other officers on foot wearing high-visibility jackets, followed by tactical teams in green-camouflage gear, and then officers in light armoured vehicles and on horseback bringing up the rear. In at least one case, officers broke a truck's window to reach its occupant, who refused to exit their vehicle. Police also removed children from the site, citing a fear for their safety during the operation.

A protester was arrested and charged for allegedly throwing a bicycle and hitting the legs of a horse from the Toronto Police Service Mounted Unit. In the ensuing skirmish, some pepper spray was used. Ottawa Police reported that several officers and horses had been assaulted by demonstrators while attempting to clear the red zone, and over 100 people had been arrested by the evening of February 18. In the afternoon of February 19, police were present in force and were mopping up the area. By late afternoon, the last large group of protesters was corralled near the corner of Bank and Sparks Streets, with police holding a line for several hours as the crowd swelled to approximately 1,000 by dusk and a street party (with an impromptu DJ) ensued. After nightfall, the line of police unexpectedly advanced on the celebratory crowd, pushing it a block south to Queen Street, spraying pepper gas as they did so. Fencing was erected afterwards, and the crowd gradually dispersed over the course of the night. In total, 170 people had been arrested and a few dozen trucks towed. Protest leaders advised leaving the area and were asking for permission to do so. Pepper gas had been used; one police officer suffered a minor injury.

=== Municipal response ===
Ottawa Mayor Jim Watson described the situation as "the most serious emergency our city has ever faced".

=== Provincial response ===
On February 11, Ontario Premier Doug Ford declared a state of emergency in the province. On the same day, Ontario Superior Court granted an injunction to remove protesters from the Ambassador Bridge. The injunction was sought by multiple industry groups affected by the blockade including the Automotive Parts Manufacturers' Association. On February 23 at 5:00 pm, Ontario ended the state of emergency.

=== Federal response ===
==== Emergencies Act ====
On February 14, Trudeau invoked the Emergencies Act. The Act gave police extraordinary powers to "end border blockades and the occupation of downtown Ottawa by so-called 'Freedom Convoy' protesters." Deputy Prime Minister Chrystia Freeland said that under the Act, protesters' "trucks can be seized, their corporate accounts frozen and vehicle insurance suspended". While Trudeau insisted that the military would not be deployed, Emergency Preparedness Minister Bill Blair did not rule out deployment, and called the lack of enforcement by Ottawa Police "inexplicable". The Emergencies Act replaced the former War Measures Act, which was famously invoked by Trudeau's father, former Prime Minister Pierre Trudeau, to deploy the Canadian Forces against the Front de libération du Québec during the 1970 October Crisis. This was the first time the act had been invoked since its 1988 enactment.

After the invocation of the Act, Chrystia Freeland, Deputy Prime Minister and Minister of Finance announced that the purview of the Financial Transactions and Reports Analysis Centre of Canada was expanded to include the monitoring of funds sent through crowdfunding platforms such as GoFundMe, where protestors had raised millions that were ultimately refunded, as well as payment providers formerly outside its scope. Freeland specifically cited cryptocurrency transactions, which the protestors turned to after GoFundMe, as a type of digital transaction that the new measures were meant to cover. Canadian banks were also temporarily given the authority to freeze accounts suspected of being used to support the protests without the need to obtain court orders, were granted legal immunity if they chose to do so, and were allowed to more freely share information with law enforcement and government agencies.

On February 21, the House of Commons voted to confirm the Emergencies Act, with 185 for and 151 opposing the motion. On February 23, Trudeau told a press conference that he would lift the Emergencies Act at 5:00 p.m. He warned that any violations of law during the emergency would be investigated.

== Related events ==
=== Other border crossing obstructions ===
==== British Columbia–Washington ====
Beginning February 5, protesters attempted to blockade the Pacific Highway Border Crossing between Blaine, Washington, and Surrey, British Columbia.

Protesters returned on February 12, where a police barricade was set up. A convoy led by a privately owned vehicle painted in military style broke through the police barricades, and the border crossing was subsequently closed.

Surrey RCMP moved into the area to clear it on February 13, making 12 arrests.

On February 15, the border crossing reopened.

==== Manitoba–North Dakota ====
Beginning February 10, a blockade closed off the Pembina–Emerson Border Crossing in Emerson, Manitoba.

Through RCMP negotiating, protesters voluntarily left the blockade on February 16 and the border crossing was reopened.

The blockage at Emerson, Manitoba border crossing was cleared February 15, 2022.

=== Other Canadian protests ===
==== Toronto ====
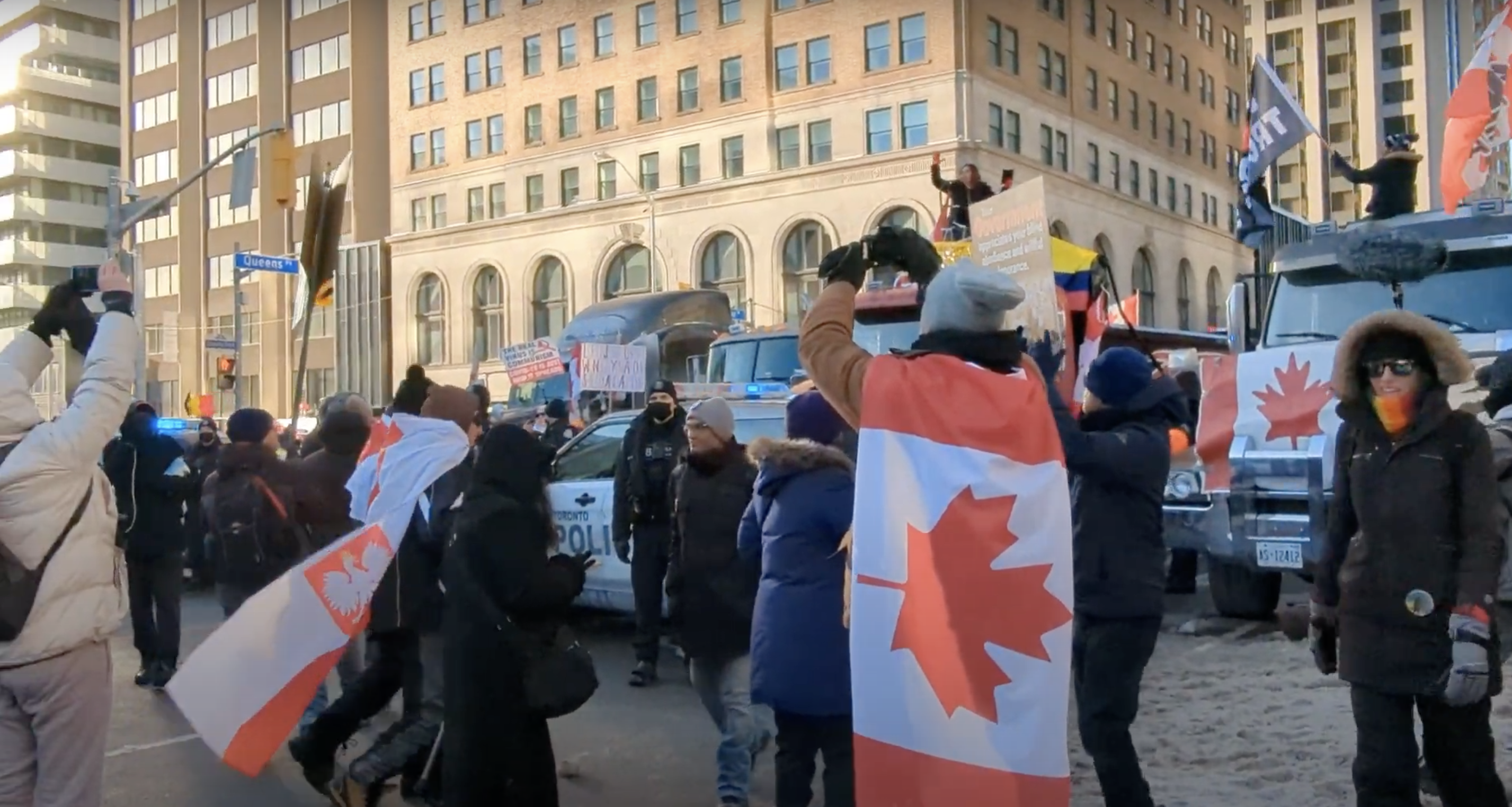
Toronto version of the Freedom Convoy protest on February 5, outside of the Royal Ontario Museum

On February 4, 2022, some vehicles and tractors arrived outside the Royal Ontario Museum on Avenue Road north of Queen's Park in Toronto. Also on February 4, Toronto Police started closing roads in the downtown in anticipation of a large protest and told residents to expect a larger police presence during the weekend.

On February 5, truckers, tractor drivers, and protesters arrived in Queen's Park to protest COVID-19 vaccine mandates. In response, a group of healthcare workers staged a counter-protest. Protest activity later moved north to Bloor Street and later to the intersection of Bloor Street West and Avenue Road. Hundreds of protesters and several trucks blocked the intersection for hours. Long stretches of major arterial roads, including University Avenue, College Street, and Yonge Street, were shut down. Fearing possible threats against healthcare workers, University Health Network and Sinai Health System, which operate major hospitals in the protest area, warned their employees to avoid wearing any clothing or badges that would identify them as health-care workers outside hospital premises.

During the protest, a 22-year-old man was arrested and charged with assault with a weapon, use of a smoke bomb (administering a noxious substance), and public mischief. A second man was arrested for assault with a weapon after throwing feces at another person.

==== Winnipeg ====
On February 5, at a related protest in Downtown Winnipeg, four people were injured in a ramming incident. One was hospitalized and later released. As of February 7, protests were on their fourth day. Police have yet to write tickets or lay charges against protesters, despite numerous noise complaints, fireworks without permit, and incidents of "homophobia, racism, and gender-based harassment."

==== Fredericton ====
A protest targeting the New Brunswick Legislature in Fredericton began on Friday, February 11. Fredericton Police established checkpoints leading into the city's downtown, and refused entry to any large truck without a valid manifest. A group of about 300 protesters gathered at the New Brunswick Legislative Building, growing to a peak of 700 by Saturday. By Sunday afternoon, police reported that about 70 protesters remained in the city, and that there had been three arrests related to the protest, and numerous tickets issued for traffic and city bylaw infractions.

==== Nova Scotia ====
On January 30, the Government of Nova Scotia made it illegal for people to gather on Highway 104 along the border with New Brunswick in anticipation of protesters blockading the highway. On February 6, hundreds of vehicles drove through Halifax as part of the "Freedom Convoy". On February 12, hundreds of people from around Nova Scotia travelled to Halifax to protest. The Halifax Regional Police blocked off access to some roads in downtown Halifax in response to the protest.

==== Edmonton ====
Protestors gathered in Edmonton for three consecutive Saturdays, and an Alberta Court of Queen's Bench Justice granted an interim injunction on February 11, 2022, prohibiting protest participants from causing incessant sound with horns and megaphones within city limits. Edmonton Police Service (EPS) was criticized by City Councilor Michael Janz for taking stronger enforcement measures against a counter protest than it did with the main protest. According to EPS, the responses varied as they tried to protect public and officer safety, and keep traffic moving.

==== Other ====
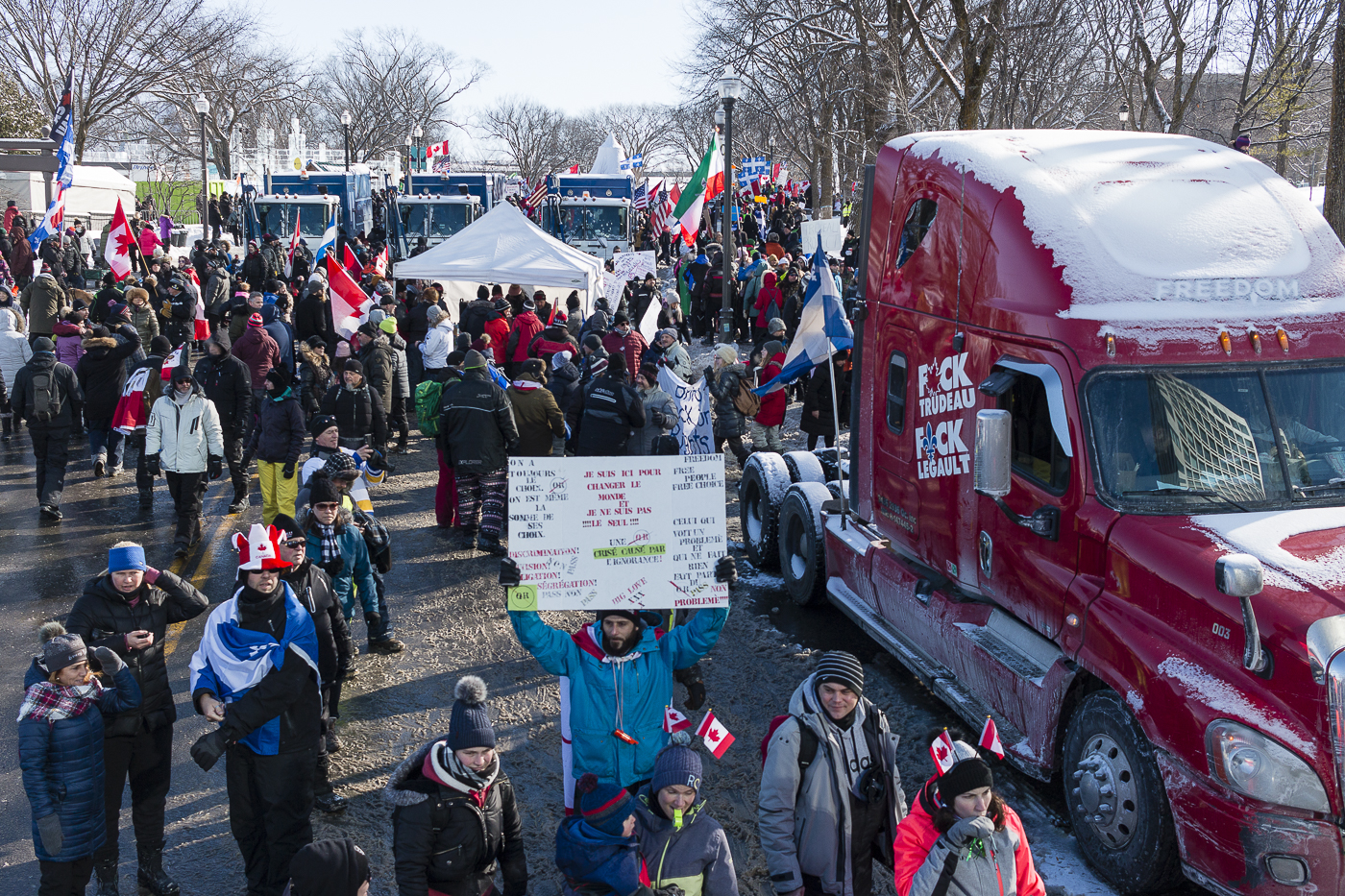
Freedom Convoy (French: Convoi de la liberté) protest in Quebec City on February 5, 2022

Truckers and protesters have gathered in Oakville, Mississauga, Vaughan, other parts of the Greater Toronto Area, Orangeville, Quebec City, Calgary, Vancouver, Vancouver Island, Kelowna, Regina, and Victoria. A convoy in Charlottetown attracted hundreds of protesters on February 12, mostly driving personal vehicles and farm equipment.

=== International protests ===
The Freedom Convoy also inspired several Facebook and Telegram groups organizing similar protests in 34 countries including Argentina, Austria, Cyprus, New Zealand, Australia and the United States. As is the case in Canada, demonstrations were partly supported by local far-right groups; in Finland by members of neo-fascist Blue-and-Black Movement, Soldiers of Odin and Power Belongs to the People, and in Germany by the Reichsbürger movement and Alternative for Germany.

In February 2022, a solidarity protest was organized in the United Kingdom with a convoy driving from Scotland to London with stops in cities throughout the British isles. Other convoys were reported in Wales and parts of England.

Officials in Paris and Brussels banned protests relating to the Freedom Convoy, following information from organizers of a similar event opposed to France's Health Pass, le Convoi de la Liberté, that five convoys from across France were due to reach Paris between February 11 and 14. French Police used tear gas to disperse protesters, in addition to intercepting hundreds of vehicles and issuing hundreds of fines to those participating in the convoy.

On February 23, a group of American truckers began a solidarity protest convoy from California to Washington, D.C. called the "People's Convoy". In response, The Pentagon approved the deployment of 700 unarmed National Guard troops to D.C. In early March, a demonstration was held by convoy protesters in D.C. near the Washington Monument, but only a small number of people attended. One convoy called the "US Freedom Convoy" was scheduled to arrive in D.C. on March 1, but disbanded when only five trucks arrived in Las Vegas from Los Angeles. Also in early March, more than 1,000 large trucks, recreational vehicles and cars gathered in the outskirts of D.C. as part of the "People's Convoy" protest. A website for the protest said that they will not enter "D.C. proper". One participant, who described himself as the lead trucker, said he would drive his truck into the city. After three weeks of protesting, on March 27, People's Convoy co-organizer Mike Landis announced that the convoy would leave D.C. and drive back to California. On May 20, 2022, the People's Convoy disbanded and declared "victory" despite never reentering D.C. as planned. Several smaller splinter groups formed in the aftermath of the disbandment, such as the 1776 Restoration Movement.

=== Rolling Thunder Ottawa ===
A motorcycle convoy of "hundreds" is scheduled to enter Ottawa on April 29. The group's route intends to stop at the National War Memorial and Parliament Hill. Looking to avoid of a repeat of the previous convoy, Ottawa Police announced that vehicles would not be allowed near the Hill. Ottawa Police are to be joined by members of the Royal Canadian Mounted Police, Ontario Provincial Police, and various municipal police services. Up to 831 RCMP are available as special constables.

The Royal Canadian Legion distanced itself from the protest, stating in part "The Legion defends these sacred sites of Remembrance, and asserts that they should never be used as a backdrop for any other agenda beyond the act of Remembrance. Our hope and appeal to all who may gather before the National War Memorial this weekend is that they do so with a focus purely on Remembrance."

A large crowd gathered on Rideau Street in the evening, in front of Rideau Centre. After an escalation of crowd aggression, police with helmets and shields were deployed. An attempted to occupy a parking lot was overturned. In total, seven people were arrested on the first evening. A professor who studies the dynamics of protests counted less than a thousand people at the rally, including police and journalists. A counter protest, described as an "unwelcoming party", was held by locals at Strathcona Park.

Saturday's planned events include a rally at Parliament Hill featuring COVID-19 conspiracy theorist Christopher Saccoccia, widely referred to as Chris Sky. Rolling Thunder's organizer, Neil Sheard, has attempted to distance himself from Saccoccia. Another group, "Ottawa Unity Chain," intends to form a human chain. It claims to have collaborated with Sheard's group.

== Results and aftermath ==
=== Parliamentary committee investigations ===
The House of Commons committee structure lent itself to ongoing investigations, in the Canadian House of Commons Standing Committee on Finance (FINA), the Canadian House of Commons Standing Committee on Public Safety and National Security (SECU) and the Canadian House of Commons Standing Committee on Procedure and House Affairs (PROC).

Early in March 2022, a Special Joint Committee on the Declaration of Emergency (DEDC) of the Senate and the House of Commons was struck to investigate the events associated with it.

==== FINA Committee ====
The FINA committee had its first session on the Invocation of the Emergency Act and Related Measures on February 22 and, as of April 28, had elicited testimony from 22 witnesses over seven hearings.

==== SECU Committee ====
As early as February 10, before the protest ended, the SECU committee devoted two sessions to the Crowdfunding Platforms and Extremism Financing investigation, and interviewed 17 witnesses in the Occupation of Ottawa and the Federal Government's Response to Convoy Blockades segment.

On February 25, in sworn witness testimony to the SECU committee, Public Safety Minister Marco Mendicino, in answer to the Shadow Minister for Public Safety Raquel Dancho, stated that "I would just point out that from the very outset of the illegal blockade, that a number of organizers and leaders of the so-called Freedom Convoy made a number of profoundly concerning and extremist statements calling for the overthrow of the government through violence."

On March 24, the Commissioner of the Ontario Provincial Police Thomas Carrique stated in sworn testimony before the committee that "the province's intelligence bureau identified a threat associated with the lengthy protest in the national capital on February 7, one week before the federal government invoked the Emergencies Act...that the Freedom Convoy blockades were a provincial and national emergency" and that the "situation and the associated events simultaneously taking place across Canada required unprecedented national collaboration to prevent injury, preserve life and protect critical infrastructure."

On May 19, Shadow Minister for Emergency Preparedness Dane Lloyd asked Minister of Public Safety Marco Mendicino about the need for the invocation of the Emergencies Act and elicited the comment that the latter "stands by previous statements that the federal government invoked the Emergencies Act on the recommendation of law enforcement officials." The "previous statements" were in witness testimony that Mendicino made at a SECU committee hearing in April, to wit that the government "invoked the act because it was the advice of non-partisan professional law enforcement that the existing authorities were ineffective at the time to restore public safety."

==== PROC Committee ====
On May 17, the PROC committee heard sworn testimony from interim Ottawa Police Chief Steve Bell that at no time did he request the invocation of the Emergencies Act from the Trudeau government.

==== DEDC Committee ====
Early on in the life of the DECD committee its NDP co-chair, Matthew Green, said that committee members "have a 'responsibility' to work together" in light of the disagreement of the Official Opposition over the constitution of the committee. It consisted of seven MPs and four senators. On March 6, co-chair Green was "interested in looking at the actions of police (or the lack of them), the role played by 'dark money' raised through" the GoFundMe and GiveSendGo crowdfunding platforms. The Senate co-chair (one of three), Gwen Boniface, was the OPP commissioner from 1998 until 2006.

On May 11, RCMP Commissioner Brenda Lucki stated under oath to the DECD committee that "while her agency was consulted, it never requested nor recommended the [Emergency Act]'s use".

==== Public Order Emergency Commission ====
On April 25, Trudeau announced the establishment of the Public Order Emergency Commission, an independent inquiry into the invocation of the Emergencies Act headed by Justice Paul Rouleau. The inquiry is independent of the parliamentary review committee. By law, the inquiry must complete its report and submit it to Parliament by February 20, 2023. The inquiry was scheduled initially to start on September 19, 2022, and run until October 28, 2022. Due to Justice Rouleau undergoing surgery to address a health issue, it is now expected to complete its public hearings on November 25, 2022.

A government press release said it is hoped investigations will "prevent these events from happening again". Conservatives said the investigations are too focused on the actions of protesters and their fundraising, and not on justifying the use of the Emergencies Act or determining whether it was appropriate for it to have been invoked.

The commission, which released its report on February 17, 2023, concluded that the threshold for invoking the Emergencies Act had been met.

=== Economic loss and costs ===
On February 15, there were reports that the blockage of the Ambassador Bridge could result in and costs to the automobile industry representing approximately US$1.2 billion in the economies of both the United States and Canada.

The Director of the University of Waterloo's Cross Border Institute stated to CBC News that the economic loss from the Ambassador Bridge blockade was between $3 billion and $6 billion. Every day, vehicles and auto parts valued at approximately US$141.1 million flow across the Bridge. Major auto manufacturers were forced to pause production; "automakers and their suppliers" were having to "scramble to get parts to plants on time" for the current week's run. A previous estimate by BBC on February 12 said that the estimated total cost to the automobile industry was about US$600 million (c. CA$763 million). Experts say that the economic effects will be "felt by the auto industry and others for weeks". The demand for vehicles is strong even with prices at record highs, but dealers' lots remain empty.

Reuters reported citing IHS Markit's data that the "estimated loss" by February 14 "to the auto industry alone could be as high as $850 million."

Twenty-five per cent of the value of "all U.S.-Canada goods trade" pass over the Ambassador Bridge daily—approximately $360 million in both directions a day.

During the first week alone, businesses in downtown Ottawa, including the city's busiest and largest shopping mall, the Rideau Centre, lost nearly CA$20 million, according to the Retail Council of Canada.

==== In Ottawa ====
Canadian economist Armine Yalnizyan estimated losses such as workers' wages—CA$11 million a day for a total of $264 million—as well as other costs that Canadian taxpayers would have to pay for damages caused by the "Ottawa occupation". The estimated loss of sales at the Rideau Centre—$3 million a day according to the Retail Council of Canada—amounts to a total of $72 million. Over 50 per cent of the 235 businesses in the area that was blockaded lost revenue. Taxpayers will pay for the $300 a week for those workers who are eligible for the Canada Worker Lockdown Benefit. They will also pay for the $20 million the federal government will provide to local businesses who lost revenues. The $2.5 million for Ottawa LRT free public transit will be paid by taxpayers, as will the millions of dollars for extra police reinforcements. Yalnizyan also noted the "incalculable damage" to Canada's international reputation as a trade partner which could have a negative impact on supply chains and "political discourse." She did not include the cost to those who lived in the neighbourhoods most impacted, who could not leave their homes and in some cases were "unable to sleep or access clean air or, at times, even food." As well, other communities and neighbourhoods had to live with a reduced police force and therefore reduced safety, as officers were seconded to Ottawa's downtown core.

The Ottawa Police Service (OPS) initially claimed that every day protests were ongoing was costing CA$800,000. Consistent with earlier estimates, Ottawa Police Services Board announced on February 15 that the cost was around $785,000 per day, resulting in an estimated $14.1 million over the course of 18 days. According to Mayor Watson, the Chief of Police's request for 1,800 additional officers could increase the cost to $2.5 million daily. In comparison, by February 8, the cost of the truck convoy had already eclipsed the $620,000 in average policing costs for Ottawa's annual Canada Day celebrations. In addition to policing costs, by February 7, the convoy cost an additional $1 million in other city services.

The closure began January 29, with the mall reopening on February 22. An imitation firearm in the mall resulted in a police-led evacuation, multiple hour closure, and closure of the O-Train at nearby stations.

Based on a class-action lawsuit against organizers, lawyer Paul Champ estimated that lost wages and revenue in the downtown core totalled at least $CA306 million. Efforts to fundraise for affected charities includes one called "Make Ottawa Boring Again."

==== Alberta–Montana ====
According to a February 3 CTV News report, the economic loss of the Sweetgrass–Coutts Border Crossing border crossing closure was estimated at CA$220 million. Canadian Manufacturers & Exporters estimated on February 3, that $44 million in daily cross-border trade was affected by the blockade at the border crossing that averages CA$15.9 billion annually in two-way trade.

Alberta RCMP tried to negotiate with the protesters blocking access to the Coutts border crossing. Police attempted to clear the blockade on February 2, 2022, by blocking access to the protest site and ordering participants to leave or face arrest. The operation was halted due to safety concerns, after multiple vehicles drove around the police barricades to reach the border blockade, travelled on the wrong side of the highway, and two vehicles collided. A local resident alleged that her SUV was hit by one of these vehicles while she and her family were attempting to get groceries. Someone from the other vehicle punched the resident's husband, who received stitches as a result. The RCMP began a new operation to clear the blockade, after discovering and seizing a substantial cache of guns and armour on February 14. There were 13 arrests on February 14 in relation to this seizure. The border crossing fully re-opened on February 15, after protest participants agreed to leave peacefully.

==== Ontario–Michigan ====
The economic loss caused by the blockade at the Ambassador Bridge connecting Windsor and Detroit, due to initial delays, was estimated at US$50 million per day when border crossing was still open but at a standstill, according to a February 9 Guardian article.

BBC reported on February 12 that due to rerouting to other border crossings, that the estimated total cost to the automobile industry was calculated at approximately US$600 million (c. CA$763 million). According to the United States State Department Ambassador Bridge website, there is US$323 million worth of goods crossing it daily; with 10,000 commercial vehicles crossing each week day; and US$1.7 billion in total "value in trade between Canada and the US every day."

==== Manitoba–North Dakota ====
The blockade in Emerson, Manitoba, was estimated to be causing CA$70–73 million in economic loss each day.

=== Criticism of Ottawa Police ===
In response to criticism that police had been too soft on "disruptive protesters", on February 1, Chief Sloly said that it was a "measure of success" that there were "no riots, no injuries, no deaths". By February 4, Ottawa Police's response to the protests and later encampments of lingering protesters drew criticism from local residents. Complaints focused around lack of enforcement on noise due to constant horn-honking, disruption of livelihoods and continued gridlock. Police later addressed some concerns by issuing 30 tickets on February 3.

Criticism has also focused on "the sharp contrast between the occupiers' reception and the ways police forces all over Canada treat Black and Indigenous people, who are violently policed for existing in public space, let alone protesting."

On February 4, Ottawa Police hired Navigator Ltd, a crisis public relations firm to aid in handling messaging to the public.

By February 13, on Day 17, federal Minister Blair "urged the police to do their jobs, enforce the law and restore order". Police enforcement of "layers of laws, injunctions, and emergency orders already in effect" was minimal, which further "emboldened" protesters on Ottawa's downtown core.

On day 19 of the protests, February 15, Sloly resigned as Chief of the Ottawa Police Service. Public Safety Minister Marco Mendicino announced that the RCMP and OPP would assume control of the situation in Ottawa.

On February 16, Ottawa city councillor Diane Deans was removed by council as chair of the Police board, in a 15–9 vote. Councillors described the board as ineffective in oversight, and were critical of the hiring of an interim chief without consultation. Hiring is something the Ontario Police Services Act allows them to do, and the choice had received support of the Ontario Solicitor General. A vote to remove councillor Carol Anne Meehan from the board failed. Councillor Rawlson King resigned from the board during the meeting. A citizen vice chair resigned earlier in the day.

Six investigators and two forensic investigators from the Special Investigations Unit are investigating two incidents involving the police. The first is an incident on Friday, at about 5:14 p.m. on Rideau Street and Mackenzie Avenue involving a Toronto Police Service officer in the mounted police unit and a 49-year-old woman, who "has a reported serious injury". The family of the woman said that "she is alive and is recovering from a broken clavicle." This was also confirmed by paramedics. (Note: The Special Investigations Unit is "an independent government agency that investigates the conduct of police officers that may have resulted in death, serious injury, sexual assault and/or the discharge of a firearm at a person.") On "Saturday, at about 7:18 p.m. Vancouver Police Department officers discharged Anti-Riot Weapon Enfields (less-lethal firearms) at individuals in the area of Sparks Street and Bank Street".

The Ottawa Police Services Board unanimously supported a motion on February 24, for the Ontario Civilian Police Commission to open an investigation into the response to the protest.

From an access-to-information request, emails between the National Capital Commission and Ottawa Police Services revealed that law enforcement overall was hampered by poor communication, disagreement on approaches and tactics, and confusion over jurisdiction.

=== Criminal investigations ===
Active investigations are underway for a number of widely publicized incidents including those related to the Unknown Soldier's memorial and the Terry Fox statue as well as for more general incidents, including bribery, threats, assault, dangerous driving, and setting a fire in a building. An OPS hotline has been set up where victims can report crimes, including hate crimes.

Chief Sloly warned offenders that if they had come from elsewhere and committed a crime, including hate crime in Ottawa, there have been "intelligence officers, investigative officers, and multi-jurisdictional support" from across Canada at work in the background. He said, that "no matter where you live, no matter where your vehicles are registered ... You will be investigated ... We will look for you. We will charge you, if necessary, will arrest you, and we will pursue prosecutions against you."

On February 7, some two dozen arrests were made, and nearly 80 criminal investigations had begun.

On March 21, a 21-year-old Ottawa man unrelated to the protest was charged in connection with the fire. On April 6, a 41-year-old Ottawa man, also unrelated to the protest, was similarly charged.

On November 22, 2024, Pat King was convicted on charges of five criminal charges including mischief and disobeying a court order. On February 19, 2025, he was sentenced to three months' house arrest. On April 3, Tamara Lich and Chris Barber were convicted of mischief in encouraging people to join or remain at the protest, despite knowing its adverse effect on residents and businesses in Ottawa. In March 2025, the Crown said it was appealing King's sentence.

=== Lawsuits ===
==== Class-action lawsuit ====
On February 4, 2022, Ottawa human rights lawyer Paul Champ filed a $9.8 million class action lawsuit against Chris Barber, Benjamin Ditcher, Tamara Lich, Patrick King and others as organizers of the Freedom Convoy on behalf of downtown Ottawa residents over continuous air horn and train horn noise. Zexi Li, who lived in a high rise building in the centre of Ottawa and was a data analyst for Shared Services Canada, was chosen by Champ to be the lawsuit's lead complainant. In response to the suit, convoy organizers agreed to cease horn noise until 1:00 p.m. on February 6. Many protesters ignored the agreement.

The lawsuit went to court on the afternoon of February 5 and a hearing was adjourned to February 7. On February 6, Champ posted an ultimatum to protesters in Ottawa that they would be released from the lawsuit if they left Ottawa by 10:00 a.m. EST on February 7.

On February 7, Ontario Superior Court of Justice Hugh McLean issued a 10-day injunction on vehicles from honking their horns in downtown Ottawa.

By February 17, the claim had expanded to include a class of businesses and was then at $CDN306 million. Union 613 and Happy Goat Coffee were added as plaintiffs.

On February 18, as part of a class-action civil suit against the Freedom Convoy organizers, an Ontario Superior Court judge has frozen as much as CA$20 million under a Mareva order that targets cryptocurrency, raised for the convoy protests in Ottawa. Paul Champ is the lawyer for the plaintiffs, residents of downtown Ottawa. The Mareva injunction, is separate from the federal government's efforts to work with banks to have accounts frozen. The injunction freezes convoy donations which could eventually be redistributed to residents who are including in the suit.

In a decision announced on February 6, 2024, a judge ruled against a motion filed by the protesters. Convoy organizers had attempted to get the lawsuit tossed, using a motion that referred to anti-SLAPP (strategic lawsuit against public participation) legislation. Superior Court Justice Calum MacLeod sided with Ottawa residents and businesses. In February 2025, the Court of Appeal for Ontario upheld the dismissal, finding the lower court ruling had properly balanced public interest in protest with the harm to downtown residents and businesses and that there it had not seen evidence that police had directed the defendants to park for the duration and honk their horns with the intensity that they did.

==== Canadian Civil Liberties Association ====
On February 17, the Canadian Civil Liberties Association (CCLA) announced it was suing the federal government over the Act's invocation, stating that the Emergencies Act must be reserved for national emergencies, which they argued was a "legal standard that has not been met." The CCLA criticized the invocation of the Act in a press release, saying, "The federal government has not met the threshold necessary to invoke the Emergencies Act. This law creates a high and clear standard for good reason: the Act allows government to bypass ordinary democratic processes. This standard has not been met." In the same press release, the CCLA stated that the normalization of emergency legislation, "threatens our democracy and our civil liberties."

On January 23, 2024, Judge Richard Mosley of the Federal Court ruled that while the protest itself "reflected an unacceptable breakdown of public order," the use of the Emergencies Act was unreasonable, ultra vires, and had violated Section 2(b) and Section 8 of the Charter of Rights and Freedoms. The court found that orders made under the act were "overbroad" infringing on the freedom of expression of protesters who did not intend to breach the peace, and that freezing of bank accounts and collecting of financial information from banks had amounted to unreasonable search and seizure.

When asked about the ruling on the day of its release, Deputy Prime Minister Chrystia Freeland defended her government's actions, saying it was the correct decision at the time, and announced their intention to appeal. In February 2024, the government appealed the ruling. In January 2026, the Federal Court of Appeal rejected the appeal, ruling "that Cabinet did not have reasonable grounds to believe that a national emergency existed" and that "As disturbing and disruptive the blockades and the convoy protests in Ottawa could be, they fell well short of a threat to national security." The Court of Appeal also upheld the lower court's findings that the invocation had violated the Charter of Rights and Freedoms by limiting free expression and infringing on protester's rights against unreasonable search and seizure.

In March 2026, the government filed for leave to appeal to the Supreme Court of Canada.

== Statements and reactions ==
=== Canadian politicians ===
==== Liberal Party ====
Justin Trudeau, the Prime Minister of Canada, dismissed the supply chain disruption concerns as unfounded on the basis that most Canadian truckers have been vaccinated. On January 31, Trudeau called the protests an "insult to truth", saying that "we are not intimidated by those who hurl abuse at small business workers and steal food from the homeless" and "We won't give in to those who fly racist flags. We won't cave to those who engage in vandalism, or dishonour the memory of our veterans."

Omar Alghabra, the Minister of Transport, said on January 31, that since January 15 when the truck drivers' vaccine mandate came into effect, the traffic volumes of transport trucks crossing the Canada-US border had not decreased. Compared to the fall of 2021, and based on Statistics Canada's most recent figures, even with a "massive snowstorm, even though it was a U.S. holiday, we had almost 100,000 truckers cross the border". On CTV's January 30 Question Period, Alghabra said that some voices in the crowd of protestors are "really disturbing and unacceptable" and "must be condemned"; this included those carrying signs with swastikas and Confederate flags, and those who called for the overthrow of the government. On January 24, he described them as a "small number of far-right, vocal opposition that is polluting" the debate surrounding vaccine mandates.

==== Conservative Party ====
Erin O'Toole, Leader of the Official Opposition and the Conservative Party as the convoys started, initially declined to support the protest, saying instead that the best way to maintain supply chains is for truckers to get vaccinated. O'Toole then later said he would meet with the protesters, but would not participate in nor attend their demonstration in Ottawa. O'Toole tweeted "I support their right to be heard, and I call on Justin Trudeau to meet with these hard-working Canadians to hear their concerns". O'Toole, a veteran of the Canadian Armed Forces, later condemned the protesters for desecrating the war memorials on Parliament Hill. O'Toole was ousted on a leadership review on February 2, some party members citing his policy reversals on issues such as his support for the protest.

Conservative MPs Candice Bergen, Andrew Scheer, Garnett Genuis, Pierre Poilievre, Martin Shields, Warren Steinley, Jeremy Patzer, and Leslyn Lewis all expressed their support for the convoy and truckers' movement, although some, such as Poilievre, denounced individual protesters who were promoting extremism. Damien Kurek and Michael Cooper attended the rally, serving food. Cooper was further interviewed on television. A person in behind Cooper had an upside-down Canadian flag with a swastika; Cooper says that he was unaware. Bergen, who became interim Conservative leader after Erin O'Toole's ouster, has privately advocated against dispersing protesters, and insisted in the House that Trudeau extend an "olive branch". Before O'Toole was removed from the Conservative leadership, Bergen had implored him to support the protestors, saying that "there were good people on both sides", which has been described by writers as an echo of the phrase made by Donald Trump in regard to the Unite the Right rally in 2017.

On February 10, as a third border blockade began in Manitoba, the Conservatives reversed their position supporting the border blockades. Bergen called for the blockades to disperse, "for the sake of the economy", but vowed to continue pushing the governing Liberals to release a clear plan for ending COVID-19 restrictions.

During debate on the Emergencies Act, Conservative members of parliament dismissed the convoy; deputy whip Lianne Rood called it joyful, and compared it to Canada Day. Conservative Member Michael Cooper called a Liberal Member "a despicable human being".

==== Other Canadian politicians ====
People's Party of Canada leader Maxime Bernier, Ontario Party Leader Derek Sloan, and independent Ontario MPP Randy Hillier expressed support for the convoy protests. The People's Party organized a rally in Waterloo on January 23 supporting the convoy, at which Bernier and Hillier both spoke. Bernier also attended the January 29 event at Parliament Hill, criticizing Erin O'Toole for not attending. Hillier would later speak at the convoy, stating "this is the hill we die on." Hillier also spoke on Russia Today about the convoy, and later tweeted "Russia news provides a platform for objective journalism where Canadian msm [sic] creates fabrications".

Other Canadian politicians—including Jagmeet Singh, leader of the New Democratic Party, and Ottawa City Councillor Catherine McKenney—described the protests as extremist. Mayor of Port Coquitlam Brad West condemned the defacing of Fox's statue during the protest. Premier of Ontario Doug Ford called the protest in Ottawa "an illegal occupation" and called for an end to the protests.

On January 29, Premier of Saskatchewan Scott Moe issued a letter in support of the protest. Although repeatedly encouraging vaccination, Moe argued that it would only reduce the chance of severe outcomes, and did not prevent infection or transmission of COVID-19—a statement that was subsequently disputed—and for that reason he did not support the cross-border vaccine mandate, and would lift proof of vaccination requirements in Saskatchewan "in the not too-distant future".

Members of Parliament reported an increase in inappropriate and threatening calls to their offices, in correlation with the protests.

=== American politicians and media figures ===
Multiple Republican politicians and media figures endorsed the Freedom Convoy including US Senators Marsha Blackburn, Ted Cruz, Steve Daines, and Rand Paul, US Representatives Jim Banks, Dan Bishop, Lauren Boebert, Ken Buck, Madison Cawthorn, Paul Gosar, Marjorie Taylor Greene, Jim Jordan, Kevin McCarthy, Chip Roy, Steve Scalise, Governor Ron DeSantis, Kay Ivey, former US President Donald Trump, former Governor Mike Huckabee, former White House Chief of Staff Mark Meadows, TV personalities Donald Trump Jr., Lara Trump, and singer Ted Nugent. Fox News' personalities Tucker Carlson, Sean Hannity and Laura Ingraham expressed support for the protestors in broadcasts.

Former United States Ambassador to Canada Bruce Heyman criticized American groups' support and funding of the protests.

On February 10, US Transportation Secretary Pete Buttigieg and Homeland Security Secretary Alejandro Mayorkas contacted their Canadian counterparts, recommended the use of Canadian federal powers, and offered the support of the Departments of Transportation and Homeland Security. Michigan Governor Gretchen Whitmer stated of the convoy, "It's hitting pay checks and production lines. That is unacceptable."

According to CBC News, "While the Democrats and the White House said almost nothing about Trudeau invoking the Emergencies Act, the Republican ecosystem sprouted thickets of indignation." Carlson called Trudeau "Canadian dictator Justin Trudeau" and ran the headline: "Trudeau has declared Canada a dictatorship."

Facebook stated that they had removed fake users that were set up in overseas content farms, in Romania, Vietnam, and Bangladesh, which were promoting the convoy protests in Canada. After this announcement, New York Democratic Congresswoman Carolyn Maloney questioned Facebook as to the number of the accounts, when they were identified and how many impressions they had on US and Canadian users, comparing it to Russian interference in the 2016 US elections. In a letter to Zuckerberg, Maloney cited that "One Bangladeshi firm was responsible for attracting more than 170,000 members to some of the largest 'Freedom Convoy' organizing groups on Facebook."

After Ottawa was cleared, conservative commentator Candace Owens called for American troops to be sent to Canada "to deal with the tyrannical reign of Justin Trudeau Castro." Alt-right personality Mike Cernovich described Trudeau as a fascist.

=== Trucking industry and labour groups ===
In their February 7 statement, Teamsters Canada, representing more than 55,000 professional drivers, including approximately 15,000 long-haul truck drivers, of whom 90 per cent are vaccinated, said that the protest "serves to delegitimize the real concerns of most truck drivers today". The statement said that the convoy and "the despicable display of hate led by the political right and shamefully encouraged by elected conservative politicians does not reflect the values of Teamsters Canada."

On January 25, the Canadian Trucking Alliance (CTA), a truckers' trade association, and the federal government issued a formal statement reinforcing the use of vaccinations, along with other public health measures, to protect Canadian health care and to reduce COVID-19 risk. In the statement, the CTA and the government committed to working together to respond to supply chain constraints.

A January 29 CTA statement cautioned the public that a "great number of protestors" have no connection to the trucking industry and "have a separate agenda beyond a disagreement over cross border vaccine requirements". CTA's January 22 statement had announced that they do "not support and strongly disapprove of any protests on public roadways, highways, and bridges" and the disruption of the "motoring public on highways and commerce at the border". CTA members can express their disagreement with government policies by holding an "organized, lawful event on Parliament Hill". CTA's president, Stephen Laskowski, said the trucking industry "must adapt and comply with this mandate".

The Private Motor Truck Council of Canada noted concern about the convoy's "racist remarks", citing the comparisons to Nazis and communism. The Atlantic Provinces Trucking Association and the British Columbia Trucking Association both criticized the protest.

The Canadian Labour Congress called the protest in Ottawa "an occupation by an angry mob trying to disguise itself as a peaceful protest".

Various trucking companies have tried to distance themselves from the convoys, claiming that the vehicles are owner-operated, despite featuring their logos.

=== Mass media outlets ===
According to The New York Times, "In an increasingly polarized political environment, the Canadian truckers became an instant cause célèbre." Though declaring "We disagree with protestors' cause", the newspaper conceded that "[protestors] have a right to be noisy and even disruptive." In late January, CBC host Nil Köksal pondered that "there is concern that Russian actors could be continuing to fuel things as this protest grows. But perhaps even instigating it from, from the outset". In October 2022, the Canadian Security Intelligence Service said no foreign actors had funded or supported the convoy protests. A 2023 study by Caroline Orr Bueno found that RT covered the protests far more than any other outlet.

Rich Lowry of Politico argued that "The embrace of the Canadian trucker protesters by the American right is a sign that the Tea Party spirit circa the early Obama years was never fully extinguished. Since then, everything has changed — most importantly, the rise of Donald Trump and his movement — and nothing has changed. It is freedom that remains the most natural and powerful Republican rallying cry."

=== Miscellaneous ===
Canadian scholar Peter McLaren criticized the convoy protesters' "concept of freedom" as "sorely lacking in dialectical analysis", arguing that "they often limited their analysis to the blanket assertion that 'freedom' means the right to say no to any government restrictions on vaccinations, especially those impeding their ability to cross national borders, in this case, crossing freely between Canada and the United States". McLaren also argued that their concept of freedom "is historically linked to settler colonialism, that is, a form of colonialism grounded in exogenous domination, a form of colonialism that seeks to displace the original population of the colonized territory with new groups of settlers who typically justify such colonization through an identification with imperial authority."

General Wayne Eyre, Canada's Chief of the Defence Staff, said he was "sickened to see protesters dance on the Tomb of the Unknown Soldier and desecrate the National War Memorial", after video of such events surfaced online January 29.

In late January 2022, Elon Musk tweeted "Canadian truckers rule" and followed it up with "if you scare people enough, they will demand removal of freedom. This is the path to tyranny". Musk also tweeted "if Canadian government is suppressing peaceful protests, that's where fascism lies". On February 17, Musk tweeted a meme comparing Justin Trudeau to Adolf Hitler, using a meme sympathetic to Hitler. The tweet was later deleted. The American Jewish Committee condemned Musk's tweet and demanded an apology from him. The Auschwitz Memorial also condemned Musk's tweet.

Barry Prentice, transportation economy professor at University of Manitoba, stated that the truckers should be treated differently than flight crews or passenger-train employees, and that the positive aspects of vaccine mandates should be evaluated against the disruptions they would cause to the freight industry. English comedian Russell Brand released a video decrying the media for ignoring reporting on the protest. Brand also said in the video that "truckers, who were previously regarded as heroes when they were delivering vital goods and working during the lockdown, are now villains as they protest vaccine mandates". Krista Haynes, daughter of Ontario Premier Doug Ford and active anti-lockdown and anti-vaccine campaigner, attended a rally in support of the truckers as they headed to Ottawa.

The Canadian government attracted strong reaction from Indian social media. Several commentators ridiculed Trudeau, calling the protest Karma for supporting the 2020–2021 Indian farmers' protest. Actor Kangana Ranaut posted on Instagram, "Canadian PM Trudeau was encouraging Indian protestors... now in the midst of protests in his country he is hiding at a secret location... law of Karma strikes again." Sportsperson Surendra Poonia tweeted "Karma returns! Truckers protest in Canada intensifies... [Trudeau] supported tractors on roads of Delhi now facing same in his own country." Amish Devgan tweeted "Karma Strikes harder, Trudeau supported Tractors protests in Delhi last year on Jan 26th, and now [he] & his family ran away to secret location due to security threat." Indian diaspora in Canada expressed concern over the imposition of emergency in Canada, drawing comparisons with the absence of such extreme measures when the Indian government had to deal with year-long protests by farmers. Canada India Global Forum, an Indo-Canadian organization, urged Canadian PM to "follow the example of [Indian] Prime Minister [Narendra] Modi in handling peaceful protests through democratic means.” National Association of Indo-Canadians president Azad Kaushik also criticized the Canadian government, tweeting "Canada’s image as a soft power suddenly turns into a hard one unexpected of a 21st century democracy, a loss to not just Canadians but the world."

Former President of Iran, Mahmoud Ahmadenijad, praised the protests, tweeting "violent crackdown on #FreedomConvoy2022 has nothing to do with freedom of speech and human rights. How coercion could be related to liberty & freedom of choice?" and signed off with "#TruckersForFreedom".

Great Barrington Declaration co-author Martin Kulldorff tweeted in support of the protests.

According to the Washington Examiner, psychologist and conservative commentator Jordan Peterson offered a "message of congratulations and caution" to the convoy.

The Royal Canadian Legion called protesters dancing on the Tomb of the Unknown Soldier "shocking" and "strongly condemn[ed]" their actions. On February 12, as a convoy passed through Charlottetown, a lone veteran stood guard at the cenotaph outside Province House to prevent the same disrespect of the monument.

The Simon Wiesenthal Center for Holocaust Studies denounced the use of Nazi symbols by some of the protesters.

The Justice Centre for Constitutional Freedoms provides legal support of the convoy and its contacts with media.

On February 12, Facebook removed anti-vaccine, pro-convoy Facebook groups that were run from Vietnam, Bangladesh, and Romania.

Singer and activist Bill Fries, whose song "Convoy" (recorded under his alias C. W. McCall) was used as a rallying cry for the movement, gave his implicit approval for the use of the song in that manner, and was pleased that the movement had caused an uptick in interest in the song, in the final interview he gave before he died.

Durham Regional Police Service Constable Erin Howard, who made a video while in uniform in her squad car supporting the protesters and later posted it online in January, was suspended and faced six charges under the Police Services Act, including discreditable conduct and insubordination. Her first court hearing was held over Zoom on May 5, 2022, with the proceeding then being adjourned until June 2022.

Some members of the political left were initially hesitant to criticize the convoy because "the truckers were often described as a working-class movement".

=== Opinion polls ===
In an Abacus Data survey of 1,410 Canadian adults, undertaken before the protest turned into an occupation, between January 31 and February 2, 2022, 68 per cent stated that they "had very little in common" with the demonstrators and their ideology and 32 per cent of respondents stated that they "had a lot in common" with the protestors and their worldview. Furthermore, 43 per cent of respondents stated that they felt the protest was "respectful and appropriate", while 57 per cent viewed it as "offensive and inappropriate".

A study by Vox Pop Labs among a randomly pre-selected sample of 2,339 respondents, conducted between January 4 and 10, 2022, found that around 70 per cent of Canadians were willing to support a general vaccine mandate for all non-exempt adults over the age of 18, while around 30 per cent disagreed.

A routine political poll by Léger in Canada questioned respondents on the protest between February 4 and 6, 2022, and found that it was opposed by 62 per cent of respondents, with 47 per cent strongly opposing it. 32 per cent supported it, while 7 per cent were unsure. On its subsequent questionnaire, a further 65 per cent expressed the belief that the convoy represented "a small minority of selfish Canadians," 57 per cent viewed it as "not about vaccine mandates and pandemic restrictions" but rather "an opportunity for right wing supremacist groups to rally and voice their frustrations about society," and 52 per cent likened it to the 2021 United States Capitol attack. Opposition to the convoy was highest among respondents living in urban areas, those vaccinated for COVID-19, and those aged 55 and up; while support for the convoy was highest among the unvaccinated, respondents aged 18 to 54, and respondents living in Alberta. Out of all ethnic groups, only White Canadians and Filipino Canadians had a majority support for the event.

A poll by Maru Public Opinion found that 64 per cent of Canadians polled would support the aid of the Canadian Armed Forces to tow trucks from the protests and 53 per cent of Canadians polled would support the use of force by Ottawa Police to clear out Ottawa protesters.

An Angus Reid Institute poll released on February 14 found that 72 per cent of Canadians polled thought that it was time for protesters to "go home, they have made their point." The poll also found that 65 per cent polled believed Trudeau's response has worsened the situation and 42 per cent said opposition leader Candice Bergen's response has worsened the situation.

A Nanos Research poll commissioned by CTV News and released on February 25 found that 51 per cent of Canadians polled thought the protests were ineffective, 15 per cent thought they were somewhat ineffective, 20 per cent thought they were somewhat effective, 12 per cent thought they were effective, and 2 per cent were unsure of the protests' impact.

An Economist/YouGov poll conducted from February 12 to 15 found that 80% of Americans had heard of the convoy protests. The poll also found that 44 per cent of Americans opposed the convoy protests, while 40 per cent supported them. Among Republicans, 71 per cent supported the convoy protests, compared to 18 per cent of Democrats.

== See also ==
- 2022 Wellington protest
- List of incidents of civil unrest in Canada
- List of protests in the 21st century
- Populism in Canada
- Yellow Vest Protests in Canada
