= Timeline of the Freedom Convoy protest =

Dynamic timeline of Canada convoy protests

The following article is a broad timeline of the course of events surrounding the Canada convoy protest, a series of protests and blockades in Canada in early 2022. The protest, which was called the Freedom Convoy (French: Convoi de la liberté) by organizers, was "first aimed at a COVID-19 vaccine mandate for cross-border truckers" when the convoy of hundreds of vehicles, including semi-trailers, headed towards Ottawa, Ontario the nation's capital, starting on January 22. The protesters quickly changed their messaging to include demands that all COVID-19-related public health restrictions be lifted.

By late January and early February, the professional trucking industry and labour groups, such as Canadian Trucking Alliance (CTA), Teamsters Canada, Canadian Labour Congress, had published statements distancing their members from the convoy protest.

By January 29, when the convoy converged in what became known as the red zone in Ottawa, there were estimates of from 8,000 to 18,000 pedestrian protesters at its peak on the first weekend and hundreds of vehicles, including 18-wheelers that were parked directly on Wellington Street, in front of the Prime Minister's office.

In spite of an injunction by a judge and the invocation of three levels of states of emergency, municipal, provincial, and federal, protesters temporarily refused to end blockades and the occupation of the red zone. On February 14, Prime Minister Justin Trudeau invoked the Emergencies Act.

Over the weekend of February 17 to 20, a large joint-operation police presence in Ottawa arrested about 200 organizers and protesters, laid 389 charges, issued fines, removed the heavy trucks and trailers with 79 vehicles towed away, seized 36 license plates, and dismantled encampments across the city. Action was taken against thirty-six commercial vehicles by the Ministry of Transportation. By February 20, the area surrounding the Parliamentary Precinct, occupied by protesters for three weeks, was fenced off by police after it has been secured by a series of police advances pushing the crowd away from Parliament Hill. A heavy police presence remained.

All times specified or approximated given in Eastern Time, or UTC-5:00:

== Preceding events ==
=== 2020 ===
- January 25: The first "presumptive" case of COVID-19 was reported in Canada.
- May 30: The first wave of the COVID-19 pandemic in Canada, lasted 175 day, peaked on day 127, May 30, 2020, with 35,040 active cases, and ended 48 days after the peak with 35,040 active cases and 8,839 deaths.

=== 2021 ===
- January 10: The second wave, lasted 230 days, peaked on January 10, day 17, with 85,595 active cases. The second wave was the deadliest of the five waves with 13,312 deaths. There were no vaccinations available at that time.
- April 18: Vaccination campaigns began during the third wave, which peaked on April 18 with 89,884 cases. Vaccination campaigns began during this wave. While the number of cases increased slightly, the number of deaths, 2,569 decreased during the third wave.
- September 26: The Delta wave reached its peak on September 26 with 51,747 cases. It was during the fourth (Delta) wave that vaccine mandates and passports began to be considered as free vaccinations were widely available across Canada. The lowest number of deaths, 2,569 occurred during the fourth wave because of the high uptake on vaccinations and the weakening of strains and mutations thereof.
- October: New United States Department of Homeland Security regulations, released in October 2021, were regarding cross-border travel between the Canada and the United States and were based on guidance from the Centers for Disease Control and Prevention. To prevent supply chain disruptions, the DHS allowed for a window of four months—until January 22, 2022—for Canadian truckers to get fully vaccinated against COVID-19.
- November 19: The Public Health Agency of Canada announced upcoming adjustments to Canada's border measures. This would include the requirement for essential service providers, including truck drivers, to be fully vaccinated after January 15, 2022. The announcement clarified that unvaccinated or partially vaccinated foreign national truck drivers would be prohibited from entering Canada after that date. Unvaccinated Canadian truck drivers could enter Canada but would have to quarantine for two weeks. According to the Canadian Press and CBC, as of January 22, the mandates would impact an estimated 26,000 unvaccinated truckers of the 160,000 truck drivers who regularly cross the border in both the United States and Canada. When asked in the House of Commons to produce data linking truckers to COVID-19 infections in Canada, neither the minister of health Jean-Yves Duclos nor the chief public health officer Theresa Tam were able to do so.
- December: Pat King, a native of Sault Ste. Marie, Ontario who would become an organizer of the convoy, said of public health measures: "The only way this is going to be solved is with bullets."
- Mid-December: Canada Unity posted the Memorandum of Understanding on their website and sent copies to the Governor General of Canada and the Canadian Senate. until its February 8 retraction. One of the main organizers behind the convoy, Canada Unity (CU), acknowledged that they had planned to submit their signed "memorandum of understanding" (MoU) to the Senate of Canada and Governor General Mary Simon, described in the MoU as the "SCGGC". The MoU which was signed by James and Sandra Bauder and Martin Brodmann, was posted on the Canada Unity website in mid-December 2021 and publicly available Bauder, whose name is at the top of a CTV News' list of "major players" in the convoy, is the founder of Canada Unity. CTV cited Bauder saying that he hoped the signed MoU would convince Elections Canada to trigger an election, which is not constitutionally possible. In this pseudolegal document, CU called on the "SCGGC" to cease all vaccine mandates, reemploy all employees terminated due to vaccination status, and rescind all fines imposed for non-compliance with public health orders. If this failed, the MoU called on the "SCGGC" to dissolve the government, and name members of the CU to form a Canadian Citizens Committee (CCC), which is beyond the constitutional powers of either the Governor General or the Senate. The original MoU contained no specific mention of cross-border truckers as it had originally been drafted and delivered over a month earlier, but then was reissued for the protest.

=== 2022 ===
- January 9: The fifth (Omicron) wave reached a peak with the number of active cases reaching a record high of 443,676. (Note: The first (Alpha) wave, lasted 175 days, peaked on day 127, May 30, 2020 with 35,040 active cases, and ended 48 days after the peak with 35,040 active cases and 8,839 deaths. The second (Beta) wave, lasted 230 days, peaked on January 10, 2021, day 17, with 85,595 active cases. The Beta wave was the deadliest of the five waves with 13,312 deaths. There were no vaccinations available at that time. Vaccination campaigns began during the third (Gamma) wave, which peaked on April 18, 2021 with 89,884 cases. While the number of cases increased slightly, the number of deaths, 2,569 decreased during the Gamma wave. It was during the fourth (Delta) wave that vaccine mandates and passports began to be considered as free vaccinations were widely available across Canada. The Delta wave reached its peak on September 26 with 51,747 cases. The lowest number of deaths, 2,569 occurred during the fourth wave because of the high uptake on vaccinations. It was at the peak of the fifth (Omicron) wave, which occurred on January 9, that the number of active cases reached a record high of 443,676. On February 15, 2022 the number of active cases was 134,098 which was also more than three times higher than at any other peak number in the previous waves. While most cases were milder, there were 6,584 deaths recorded by mid-February. Canada's total death count of 35,679 over the 753 days of the pandemic is lower than many advanced economy nations. These figures are from the article "Timeline of the COVID-19 pandemic in Canada.")
- January 13: CBC radio reports the government has mandated that all truck drivers crossing the border must be vaccinated, reversing previous provisions for truck drivers. <CBC News post January 13, 2022> The Ontario Provincial Police report by 'Project Hendon'—OPP investigations into "illegal activity or threats to public safety" related to the protests—was shared with other police agencies. The Hendon report mentioned the Freedom Convoy for the first time.
- January 15: The January 15 enforcement of the vaccination requirement applies to truckers who are entering Canada at international border crossings. Since January 15, unvaccinated American cross-border truckers have been denied entry into Canada. Canadian truckers who are not fully vaccinated "have to show proof of a negative PCR test collected within 72 hours of arriving at the border"; they also "need to quarantine after arrival".
- January 20: A January 20 OPP intelligence report said that due to the number of people that were both "financially invested" as well as "ideologically invested" in the truck convoy, they could include a large number of protesters with the potential of gridlocking Parliament Hill area "for an extended period". A Globe and Mail article reported that in January, the OPP had warned that the convoy had "no end date". More than a half dozen OPP intelligence reports were produced in January, according to documents tabled on October 19 during the Rouleau Inquiry's public hearings.
- January 21: The OPP began to hold daily teleconferences on Project Hendon.
- January 22:
  - A reciprocal vaccination requirement for the cross-border trucking industry has been in place since January 22, when the United States enforced theirs, affecting unvaccinated American truckers returning to the United States. Unvaccinated Canadian truckers are denied entry to the United States.
  - The first convoy departed Prince Rupert, arriving in Prince George in the evening.

== Convoy ==
=== January 23–27 ===
- January 23, 2022:
  - A convoy left from Delta with supporters gathering along Highway 1, the Trans-Canada Highway.
- January 24:
  - In Saskatchewan, police in Regina reported that there were supporters greeting a convoy of about 1,200 vehicles as it drove through the Regina.
  - Emails uncovered and shared in February with the media by Distributed Denial of Secrets—a public interest non-profit transparency organization—including those dated on January 24 and January 27, source indicated that James Bauder was the Ottawa Police Service's main contacts for "planning and logistics" for the Ottawa "occupation". Garrah has been described as one of the convoy organizers; Bulford, who is a former RCMP officer, who is associated with the anti-vaccination "Mounties for Freedom" group, has been described as a convoy "spokesman." The emails included three possible plans for the occupation, two of which were legal. Plan C, which would entail "We occupying "anywhere and everywhere we can possibly go" was not legal as if including occupying "[r]oadways, highways, Parliament, public properties and NCC parking lots" which reflects the actual events.
- January 25:
  - Chris Garrah's email to the Ottawa Police Service contained a list of 16 "top convoy organizers" with their names and contact information.
  - Ontario Provincial Police (OPP) who were in contact with another convoy through Kenora, Ontario, reported that 200–300 vehicles were involved. The convoys consisted of three main routes across Canada, which would converge for the Ottawa protest on the weekend.
- January 26:
  - According to the October 17, 2022 testimony of Steve Kanellakos, Ottawa's city manager, during the Rouleau inquiry, Steve Ball, President of the Ottawa Hoteliers Association wrote to city officials saying that a message purportedly on behalf of the Canada United Truckers Convoy, was looking for hotel rooms for an estimated 10,000 to 15,000 members for a period of up to 90 days financed by the $3 million raised through crowd funding. Ball reported that the Convoy contact described how they would "leave their trucks in place, chain them together, and attempt to block all accesses to the city."
  - The Ottawa Police Service expected an estimated 2,000 demonstrators in Ottawa by January 28 weekend.
  - The OPP estimated approximately 400 vehicles had entered Ontario from the Manitoba border as part of the eastbound convoy.
  - In a phone interview Jason LaFace, one of the road captains of the convoy, said he was involved in assisting the senior organizers of the Convoy. Laface said the convoy team had an MOU delivered to the Senate and GG which garnered close to 500,000 signatures requesting to open an joint committee investigation into the unlawful manadates and with full transparency communicate with Canadians." He compared mask mandates which forced him to wear a mask in grocery stores to "living in Nazi Germany". He concluded by saying Trudeau was a criminal. The Toronto Star reported on a Kitchener Today interview with LaFace, in which he said that the convoy was "no longer about the mandate." It was "about Canada...about our rights and how the government's been manipulating the population and oppressing us all the time."
- January 27:
  - The Kingston Police estimated approximately 300 vehicles (17 full tractor-trailers, 104 tractors without trailers, 424 passenger vehicles and six RVs) to go through Kingston.
  - Intelligence reports by the Integrated Terrorism Assessment Centre (ITAC), which is part of Canadian Security Intelligence Service (CSIS), said that some convoy supporters "advocated civil war", had "called for violence against prime minister Justin Trudeau, and said the protest should be 'used as Canada's 'January 6'". The ITAC reports, which were seen by The Guardian, warned in late January that "extremists" were "likely involved" and the "potential for violence remained real".
  - During a televised address, Prime Minister Justin Trudeau stated that "a small fringe minority of people on their way to Ottawa are expressing unacceptable views and do not represent the views of Canadians" causing an outpouring of support for the convoy who viewed it as a rallying cry. Justin Trudeau later announced he regretted making the remark.

=== Initial demonstration on Parliament Hill (January 28–29) ===
- January 28:
  - The province of Nova Scotia banned gatherings along highways, specifically on the Trans-Canada (Highway 104) between the Nova Scotia and New Brunswick border, in relation to protests related to the freedom convoy.
  - The number of vehicles in the convoy was estimated as including between 551 and 1,155 vehicles with 121–230 trucks and from 430 to 925 personal vehicles.
  - A convoy of trucks from Niagara Region arrive in Ottawa, was led by West Lincoln Township councillor Harold Jonker, who served as road captain.
- January 29:
  - Canadian Trucking Alliance said many of the supporters at the protest in Ottawa had no direct connection to the trucking industry.
  - As the western convoy reached Ontario, it began to expand from its original goals. Several protesters voiced opposition to perceived authoritarianism and corruption by Prime Minister Trudeau, stating they wanted him "out of office", while others said: "This is not an anti-vaccination movement, this is a freedom movement".
  - Big rigs began to block downtown traffic near Parliament Hill in Ottawa.
  - Media reported protesters drinking and dancing on the Tomb of the Unknown Soldier at the National War Memorial, and putting protest posters and an upside-down Canadian flag on the memorial statue of cancer fundraiser Terry Fox. Images of a Canadian flag marked with a swastika were seen, as were Confederate flags. There were reports of some protesters harassing volunteers at a local soup kitchen, the Shepherds of Good Hope. Its press release said trucks were towed after blocking its ambulance drop-off zone for around half a day.
  - The Ottawa Police Service has 1,500 officers to serve the million residents of the city of Ottawa. There were only 150 officers on the streets in "three of the most affected neighbourhoods over the course of a day". OPS Chief Sloly had publicly requested an additional 1,800 officers on February 6, but by February 13, they had not arrived.
  - The Ottawa Police Service estimated the number of people to be between 5,000 and 18,000.
  - By January 29, media outlets cited Canadian Anti-Hate Network who raised concerns that included in the convoy organizers were members of the far-right who held "white nationalist and Islamophobic views".

=== Extended Protest (January 30 - February 21) ===
- January 30:
  - Ottawa's emergency and protective services manager estimated about 3,000 people gathered around Parliament Hill.
  - Pat King, who has been described as a key organizer of the convoy, said in his "live-streamed broadcast", "We are now well organized and are settling in, until Canada is a free nation again."
  - Convoy organizers held a press conference at an undisclosed location, that open only to invited "independent" outlets. Mainstream media outlets were denied access.
  - OPS launched a criminal investigation into the desecration of the National War Memorial and statue of Terry Fox. They will also be investigating "threatening/illegal/intimidating behaviour" toward police officers, workers and other private citizens.
  - OPS Chief of Police Peter Sloly said: "I think the only thing we can say for sure we're still going to be dealing with some level of traffic disruption and demonstration over the next 24 hours."
- January 31:
  - The House of Commons resumed on January 31, after the holiday break.
  - Jim Watson—who was the mayor of Ottawa during the protest—reported to the Rouleau inquiry on October 17, 2022, that the OPS was "completely outnumbered" and "could not deal with the highly-disruptive protests on their own."
- February 1: In a 6:00 a.m. Canada Newswire press release, Tamara Lich who self-identified as the Freedom Convoy's spokesperson, said that the organizers had been surprised and temporarily overwhelmed "from a logistical point of view" by the number of protesters from all across Canada, but that they were not "retreating." She said they were "well-organized" and had "settled in" and "would remain in Ottawa " "for as long as it takes...[to] end all mandates associated with COVID-19"—"until Canada is a free nation again."
- February 2: OPS chief, Sloly, described a "significant element" of American involvement in the organization and funding of the convoys. Many of the anonymous donors participating in the protest's GoFundMe campaign claimed to be from the United States, and many used false names.
- February 3: Mayor Watson submitted a request for help for additional resources to the Minister of Public Safety, Marco Mendicino.
- February 4:
  - The Guardian reported that the United States anti-vaccine mandate supporters were planning on copying Canada's convoy protests. In an interview with the Guardian, the Institute for Research and Education on Human Rights (IREHR)'s Devin Burghart said that experts that monitor far right movements are concerned that protests such as these, that attract large numbers, provide opportunities for far right groups to "normalize their presence" and "recruit new members. Burghart cited Canada's convoy protests as an example, where the "far right came out in droves."
  - Following a phone call with Mayor Watson, Mendicino said, "The convoy in Ottawa has caused significant disruption to local residents – including vandalism, harassment, expressions of hate and violence and ongoing obstruction of many essential services. The community is entitled to expect that the law is upheld and enforced by police, and that public safety is maintained." During a CBC television interview, Mendicino said, "We put the question of vaccines and vaccine mandates on the ballot ... in the (2021) election and we're simply carrying out the promise that we made with the support of the vast majority of Canadians." He said that "government would not back down on the issue".
- February 5:
  - According to the Daily Hive, protesters barbecued food, played hockey, and set up bouncy castles for their children to play in.
  - Global News reported that there were about 1,000 vehicles and 5,000 people in attendance.
- February 6 (Day 10):
  - Mayor Watson said that "demonstrators outnumbered police and controlled the situation."
  - Mayor Watson declared a state of emergency in response to the "unprecedented 10-day occupation". In his statement he said, that this "reflects the serious danger and threat to the safety and security of residents posed by the ongoing demonstrations and highlights the need for support from other jurisdictions and levels of government."
  - The "Freedom Convoy 2022 Fund Raiser" Facebook group was started on Facebook.
  - David Vigneault, CSIS director suggested that a February 6 CSIS report said that "no foreign actors at this point [were] supporting or financing the convoy," according to an October 25 Global News report.
- February 7 (Day 11):
  - The Ottawa Police Board held an emergency meeting where Ottawa city councillor and board chair, Diane Deans, said the Ottawa was "under siege", and that the disruption had "become a nationwide insurrection", with protesters "terrorizing" and "threatening" Ottawa residents.
  - OPS Chief Sloly publicly requested 1,800 officers from other police agencies.
  - An Ottawa judge, Justice Hugh McLean, granted a ten-day interim injunction to "silence the honking horns" as requested by lawyer Paul Champ on behalf of his client, Zexi Li, in their proposed class-action lawsuit filed at the Ontario Superior Court of Justice.
  - In their February 7 statement, Teamsters Canada—representing more than 55,000 professional drivers, including approximately 15,000 long-haul truck drivers, of which 90% are vaccinated, said that the so-called “freedom convoy” are "delegitimiz[ing] the real concerns of most truck drivers today". The statement said that the convoy and "the despicable display of hate lead[sic] by the political Right and shamefully encouraged by elected conservative politicians does not reflect the values of Teamsters Canada."
  - Facebook parent Meta Platforms said it had removed one convoy protest-associated Facebook group for promoting the QAnon conspiracy theory. Meta also "removed dozens" of "spammer" and "scammer" "groups, pages and accounts" that claimed ties to the truck convoy protest.
  - Self-declared spokesperson Tom Marazzo said at "emergency press conference" that he was proposing that a "core group of organizers and their supporters could sit at a table "with the Conservatives, and the NDP, and the Bloc as a coalition."
  - The Provincial Operations Intelligence Bureau (POIB)—Ontario Provincial Police (OPP)'s intelligence unit—identified the convoy as a "threat to national security", according to a statement made to the House of Commons public safety committee on March 24, 2022, by OPP Commissioner, Thomas Carrique. Carrique said that the blockades had attracted international attention and they were a "provincial and national emergency". He called for "unprecedented national collaboration to prevent injury, preserve life and protect critical infrastructure." In his testimony before the Rouleau Inquiry also known as the Public Order Emergency Commission (POEC) on October 19, POIB Superintendent, Pat Morris, said that he saw no evidence of a "threat to national security".
- February 8:
  - ITAC report raised concerns that the "online rhetoric" was "violent", and that there were "ideological extremists" who were "physically present" at "some gatherings".
  - Canada Unity retracted their MoU that had "underpinned its fight against COVID-19 measures".
- February 9:
  - Tom Marazzo, a former member of the Canadian Armed Forces, who self-described as the convoy spokesperson appeared in a video along with Tamara Lich, Paul Alexander, and Roger Hodkinson, demanding that Prime Minister Trudeau meet with him and his team of "world-class scientists"—Alexander and Hodkinson. In the video Marazzo called on protesters to come to Ottawa. Marazzo was one of the people with military experience helping the protestors to set up their base. Along with other former CAF members—Edward Cornell, Daryl Smith, Andrew MacGillivray, and Harold Ristau—they formed the steering committee of the Veterans for Freedom (V4F), the coordinator of the April 2022 Rolling Thunder protest in Ottawa and the Canada Marches events culminating on July 1, 2022—Canada Day.
- February 10:
  - The Chief Medical Officer of Health of Ontario, Dr. Kieran Moore, said that there was a "remarkable improvement" in "all of key metrics" in the province that will lead to a review of all COVID-19 "public health measures" which includes "mask mandates and proof of vaccination."
  - Michigan Governor Gretchen Whitmer called on Canada to re-open traffic on the Ambassador Bridge, saying it was affecting key sectors like autos, agriculture, and manufacturing.
  - As a third border blockade began in Manitoba, the Conservatives reversed their position supporting the border blockades. Bergen called for the blockades to disperse, "for the sake of the economy", but vowed to continue pushing the governing Liberals to release a clear plan for ending COVID-19 restrictions.
  - OPS announced on Twitter that there was a "concerted effort" to flood 911 with excessive calls to jam up Ottawa's emergency call system. The OPS reported that these nuisance calls—many of which came from the United States—were part of efforts that were "ongoing throughout this demonstration" to swat-and-dox OPS "organizations and logistics." The prank calls "endanger lives". These calls were tracked and police will "charge anyone deliberately interfering with emergencies.” OPS Chief Sloly said the 911 calls were considered to be "linked to the ongoing protests against COVID-19 vaccine mandates."
  - Protester circled Ottawa Macdonald–Cartier International Airport for two hours; the Ottawa International Airport Authority said it had little effect on operations.
  - OPS Superintendent Robert Bernier became the fourth event commander during the Ottawa protest, working under OPS deputy chief Patricia Ferguson. Bernier later led the mission to clear the capital area of protesters.
  - Coutts, Alberta border crossing protest - According to police, on February 10, protester Anthony Olienick informed two undercover female police officers that he was expecting a delivery, which the officers understood to be a bag of firearms. Police officers stated that they observed Olienick, Chris Carbert, and Jerry Morin receiving a package
- February 11:
  - Ontario Premier Doug Ford declared a state of emergency in Ontario as protesters continued to occupy the Ambassador Bridge. Ford referred to the situation in downtown Ottawa as a "siege". By February 12, police had cleared trucks from the bridge, with busloads of police, some with heavy weapons, and an armoured vehicle. Protesters returned on foot.
  - In a misappropriation of Orange Shirt Day, that was condemned by Indigenous leaders, the protest convoy declared February 11 an "orange shirt day" and called for student walkouts to end COVID-19 restrictions in schools.
  - In a virtual meeting, Prime Minister Trudeau and US President Joe Biden discussed ending the blockades at the border.
- February 12:
  - Federal Health Minister Jean-Yves Duclos alongside Dr. Tam, said that the worst of the fifth (Omicron) wave of the COVID-19 pandemic was behind us, most new cases were community-driven, and cross-border restrictions were less effective. Duclos announced an update on health restrictions in the following week.
  - Plans for the creation of the new Integrated Command Centre (ICC) were in place. The ICC was created to help Ottawa Police Services (OPS) coordinate with Ontario Provincial Police (OPP) and RCMP when the anticipated reinforcements would arrive.
  - As an estimated 4,000 protesters converged on Parliament Hill, the extra reinforcements requested by Chief Sloly on February 7 had not yet arrived.
- February 13:
  - Protesters were completely cleared from the Ambassador Bridge blockade at approximately 8 a.m, although the border was not immediately opened. The bridge re-opened Sunday evening with 25 to 30 people arrested and 12 small vehicles seized. There was a substantial police presence and Jersey barriers were installed to keep the three-mile long access road to the bridge open. On February 16, police intercepted a convoy of six or seven trucks 250 kilometres (160 mi) away from Windsor — heading towards the city after leaving Ottawa.
  - Counter protesters occupy the intersection of Bank St. and Riverside Dr. to prevent vehicles from crossing Billings Bridge to join the main protest.
- February 14:
  - Distributed Denial of Secrets (DDOS) began distributing a list of Freedom Convoy's GiveSendGo anonymous donors revealing their names and personal information. The list, which had been hacked, was shared with researchers as well as journalists.
  - Prime Minister Justin Trudeau invoked the Emergencies Act, to "end border blockades and the occupation of downtown Ottawa by so-called “Freedom Convoy” protesters." The Act gave banks and the Financial Transactions and Reports Analysis Centre of Canada (FINTRAC) temporary "powers to monitor transactions and potentially freeze accounts" in order to prevent key figures in the protest from accessing funds to continue the illegal demonstration.
- February 15: During the fifth wave there were 134,098 active cases which was more than three times higher than at any other peak number in the previous waves. While most cases were milder, there were 6,584 deaths recorded by mid-February. Canada's total death count of 35,679 over the 753 days of the pandemic is lower than many advanced economy nations.
  - A February 15 OPP intelligence report said that a "decentralized anti-government and anti-authoritarian movement" had gained momentum during the pandemic and had spawned a racist extremist movement. The OPP report also warned that It some participants "religious ideology" could "motivate extreme action" according to the Toronto Star's political correspondent.
- February 17–20: A large-numbered joint-operation police presence in Ottawa began making arrests of organizers, protesters, the removal of parked vehicles and dismantling of blockades from Ottawa streets. By February 20, the downtown of Ottawa had been secured by police, with the area in front of Parliament cleared of protesters and concrete barricades and fencing blocking off the area.
- February 18: Six investigators from the Special Investigations Unit (SIU) investigated an incident on Friday, at about 5:14 p.m. on Rideau Street and Mackenzie Avenue involving a Toronto Police Service officer in the mounted police unit and a 49-year-old woman, who had a "reported serious injury". There is a now-debunked but widely-spread online rumor that the woman had been trampled by a horse and killed. Although she was knocked to the ground by a police horse, she suffered only a strained shoulder and the investigation was dropped when her injuries were deemed too minor to fall within the jurisdiction of the SIU. (Note: The SIU is "an independent government agency that investigates the conduct of police officers that may have resulted in death, serious injury, sexual assault and/or the discharge of a firearm at a person.")
- February 19:
  - On "Saturday, at about 7:18 p.m. Vancouver Police Department officers discharged Anti-Riot Weapon Enfields (less-lethal firearms) at individuals in the area of Sparks Street and Bank Street". The incident is under investigation by the SIU "investigators and two forensic investigators."
  - In response to an OPS plea on Twitter for protesters to "stop calling critical emergency and operational phone lines" as a means of protest, anti-vaccine, and anti-mandate Lanark-Frontenac-Kingston, Ontario Independent MPP Randy Hillier, who has been with the protesters on site since late January, urged protesters through his Twitter account to "keep calling". In the Ontario area that Hillier represents in parliament, 90% of his constituents are vaccinated.
  - A statement by the "RCMP, banking sector and federal government" clarified that the Emergencies Act "account-freezing powers...do not affect donors" to the Freedom Convoy protest. The RCMP said that they, did not "provide a list of donors to financial institutions". A Conservative MP who represents the Chilliwack—Hope riding, made a widely circulated but "unsubstantiated" claim on February 20, that the bank account of one of his constituents, who had donated $50 to the Freedom Convoy, had been frozen because of the Emergencies Act.
  - A February 19 confidential OPP intelligence assessment based on their "available information", said that "foreign actors may have pushed support" for the truck convoy in Ottawa and elsewhere in Canada, "to protect or enhance their own strategic economic and political interests" according to a Global News article. Global News was the first to report details of the 19-page OPP Operations Intelligence Bureau report—one of many documents made public during the Rouleau inquiry.
  - During a series of police advances the crowd was pushed away from Parliament Hill.
- February 20:
  - The area surrounding the Parliamentary Precinct, occupied by protesters for three weeks, was cleared of all protesters and fenced off by police. A heavy police presence remained.
  - Canadian Armed Forces army reserve Warrant Officer, James Topp, began the "Canada Marches" protest walk in Vancouver at the Terry Fox Plaza with the intention of reaching the Tomb of the Unknown Soldier on Parliament Hill in June. Topp, who had been a CAF member since 1994, was facing charges laid by the Department of National Defence for published videos online in which he voiced his opposition to mandated vaccines for federal employees while wearing his CAF dress uniform.
- February 21: On Monday, downtown Ottawa was described as a "ghost town". Even though the LRT was back in service there, Wellington Street was closed off to traffic and a limited number of people were allowed in the area. Clean-up continued. There were reports of some convoy protestors regrouping in places like Vankleek Hill.

== Aftermath ==
- February 17, 2022:
  - Mareva injunction, a court order to freeze assets was submitted to Justice C. MacLeod at the Ontario Superior Court of Justice as part of a class action suit, Li et al. v. Barber et al..
  - The Canadian Civil Liberties Association (CCLA) and the Canadian Constitution Foundation (CCF) launched separate legal challenges to the federal government's invocation of the Emergencies Act.
- February 21, 2022:
  - The Canadian Department of Finance said the 206 corporate and personal bank accounts had been frozen under the Emergencies Act affecting CA$7.48-million. This also affected CA$1.2-million in cryptocurrency assets.
  - The House of Commons voted to confirm the Emergencies Act, with 185 for and 151 opposing the motion.
- February 23, 2022: Prime Minister Trudeau lifted the Emergencies Act at 5:00 p.m., nine days after it was invoked.
  - Premier Ford lifted Ontario's state of emergency at the same time.
  - In response to Conservative MP Mark Strahl's viral Tweet containing possible misinformation about a bank account being frozen under the Emergencies Act, a memo was sent to Conservative MPs cautioning them to verify claims before posting them, according to Interim Conservative Leader Candice Bergen. To ensure they were not spreading disinformation, MPs were asked to verify constituent's identity, request use of their first name, and access "written confirmation from their bank branch manager that their account was frozen in accordance with the Emergencies Act".
- March 28, 2022: The Justice Centre for Constitutional Freedoms selected Lich for its 2022 George Jonas Freedom Award for her Freedom Convoy leadership. She was given the award on June 16 in Ottawa.
- April 25, 2022: Trudeau appointed Justice Paul Rouleau to lead the Public Order Emergency Commission, also known as the Rouleau Inquiry.
- July 2022: V4F, which has partnered with Police on Guard and Canadian Frontline Nurses, coordinated the Canada Marches Canada Day events, the April 2022 Rolling Thunder motorcycle rally in Ottawa, and had set up a semi-permanent camp—Camp Eagle—on private property 40 minutes east of Ottawa with the intention of holding freedom-related events protesting what remains of COVID-19 restrictions all summer. V4F describes itself as a "freedom movement" working to "restore fundamental freedoms for all Canadians" and "uphold Canadian laws."
- October 17, 2022: The Public Order Emergency Commission began the six-week factual stage of the inquiry into the Emergencies Act. The inquiry heard testimony from about 65 witnesses, including "protest participants, law enforcement representatives, federal cabinet ministers and officials with provincial and municipal governments".
- February 17, 2023: Commissioner Paul Rouleau released the final report of the Public Order Emergency Commission. He concluded that the high threshold for invoking the Emergencies Act had been met.
- January 23, 2024: Federal Court Justice Richard Mosley ruled that the federal government's decision to invoke the Emergencies Act was unreasonable and infringed on protestors' Charter rights. The Canadian government announced it would appeal the decision.
- January 16 2026: The Federal Court of Appeal upheld Mosley's decision, finding the invocation of the Emergencies Act was unreasonable and beyond the government's authority.
- March 17, 2026: The federal government announced it would appeal the Federal Court of Appeal's decision to the Supreme Court of Canada.
- October 22, 2026: The Supreme Court of Canada announced it would hear the federal government's appeal.
