= Rideau Street McDonald's =

Former restaurant chain location

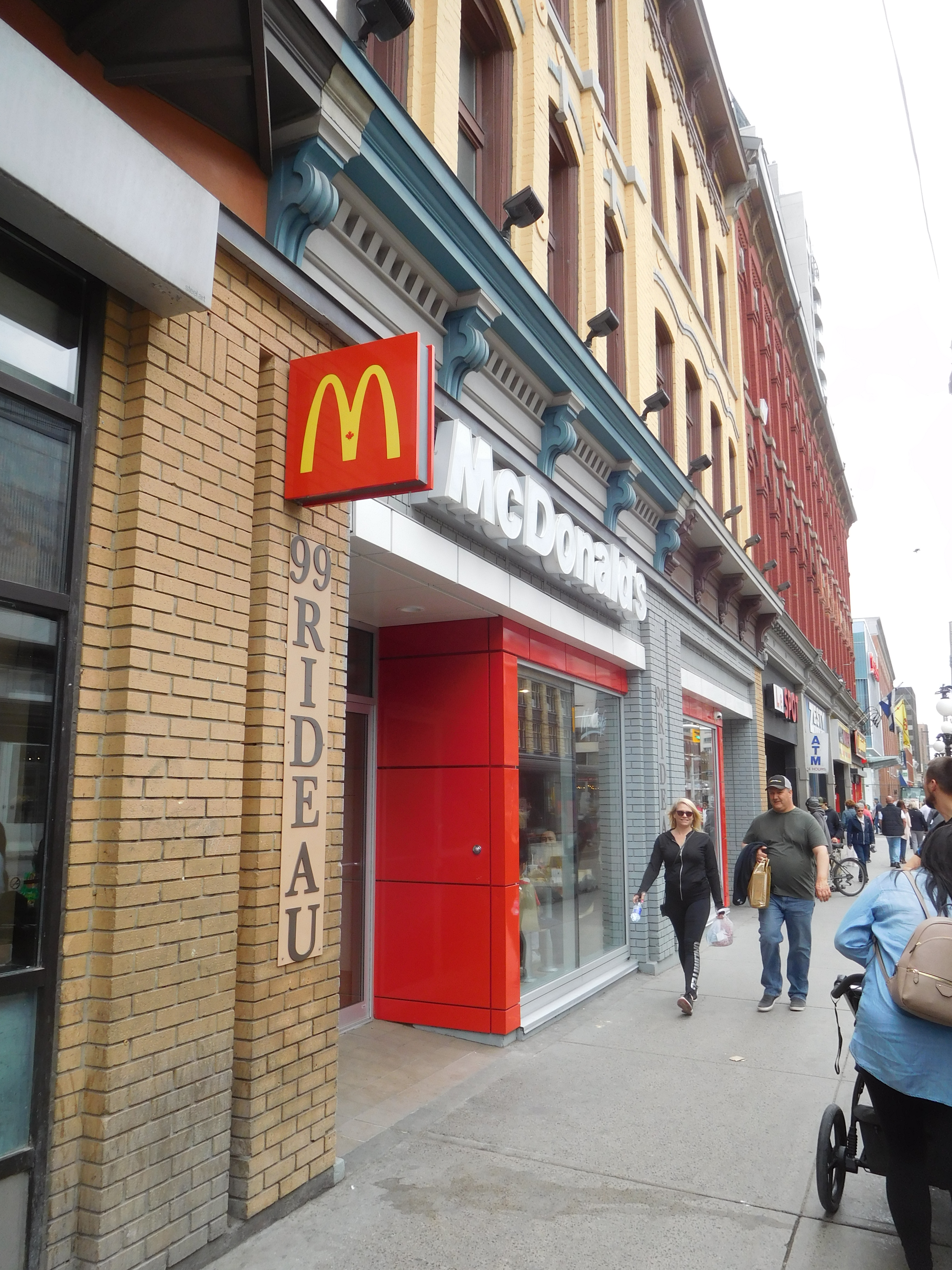
The Rideau Street McDonald's in 2019

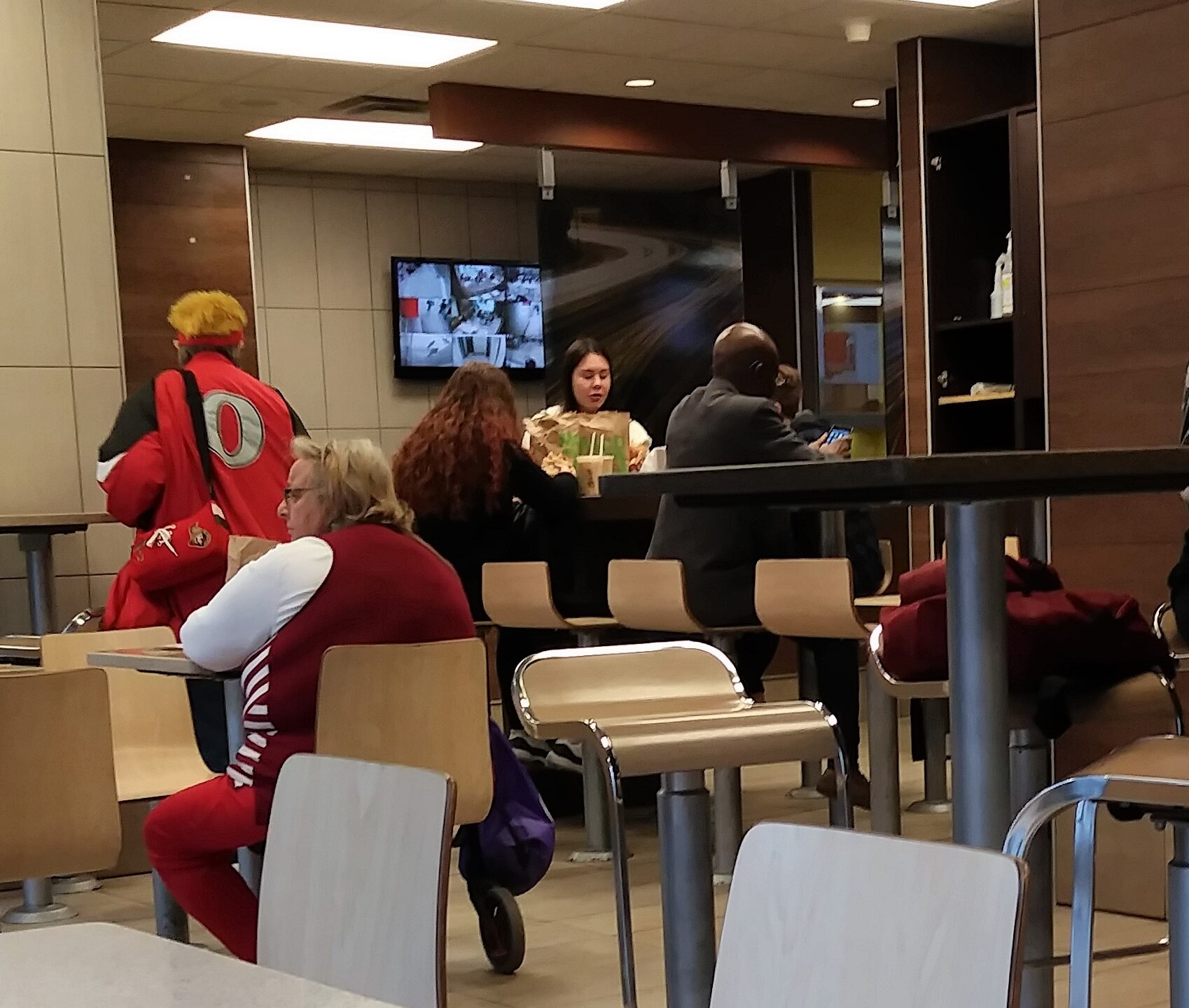
Customers eating at the McDonald's in 2019

The Rideau Street McDonald's, unofficially known as the World's Worst McDonald's, was a McDonald's restaurant at 99 Rideau Street in the ByWard Market area of Ottawa, Ontario, Canada. It operated from 1985 to 2023 and became the focus of a high rate of crime and disorder.

== 99 Rideau St. ==
In 1985, a McDonald's opened at 99 Rideau Street in a building built in 1908 and previously known as "The Atwood" apartments. In 1983, the building had received a heritage property designation under the Ontario Heritage Act, following the demolition of properties across the street to make way for the construction of the Rideau Centre. That year, the city approved construction of a shopping centre on the site which would incorporate the building's façade.

The restaurant originally spread across three floors, with seating on the main floor, a mezzanine above, and the food service counter and kitchen below. It downsized in the early 2000s, concentrating activity on the main floor. The Rideau Street McDonald's had two entrances: one on Rideau Street, and a back door on George Street that led to the rest of the ByWard market.

== Issues ==
For nearly all of its history, the restaurant was open 24 hours a day, and it attracted customers who came from bars and night clubs in the area. The restaurant's floor was often dirty, and people formed crowds rather than lines at the registers. A Toronto Star reporter wrote that "It just looks like people are gathered there to watch a concert behind the counter or something". Customers witnessed drug use and sexual acts in a long, narrow hallway to the bathrooms dubbed "The Hallway to Hell" and isolated from the rest of the restaurant. Because the McDonald's had two entrances, people passed through the restaurant as a shortcut to the ByWard Market, and criminals used it as an easy escape from police. In addition to its proximity to Ottawa's night life district in the ByWard market, the location was close to several tourist attractions, the city's largest shopping mall, the Rideau Centre, the University of Ottawa, and several emergency shelters and social support services.

The restaurant was a site of frequent stabbings, drug use, liquor licence violations, violent attacks, sexual assaults, and many other criminal acts. The Ottawa Police Service said its officers were "fed up" with the restaurant's management, who offered "little co-operation or response".

=== The "raccoon brawl" ===
In 2013, a brawl broke out near the registers at around 2 am. The incident was recorded by a bystander and posted to social media in 2014. According to the Toronto Star, "The video begins in the middle of the chaos, with young men punching, kicking, choking, and knocking or dragging each other to the ground as onlookers shout and jeer". Shortly after the start of the fight, a man appears on screen and can be seen pulling out a baby raccoon from his sweater. The man waves the raccoon around casually as a cigarette droops from his mouth. "Man and raccoon are not part of the fight, but a sideshow to it, a delightful surprise", reported the Star. The raccoon brawl made international headlines, and the cameraman later said, "I didn’t even know there was a raccoon in it until after I posted it."

Other viral videos of unusual altercations were filmed at the restaurant, such as customers beating each other with "Wet Floor" signs.

=== Public plea from Ottawa's police chief ===
On March 15, 2019, Ottawa police chief Charles Bordeleau — who had worked at McDonald's for seven years prior to joining the police force in 1984 — sent an open letter to the CEO of McDonald's Canada. The 99 Rideau location was "breaching your established standards of operation" wrote Bordeleau, outlining the restaurant's "ongoing criminal activity and social disorder". He noted the increasing burden on police, with an increase in the annual calls for help made from the restaurant from 2014 and 2017: a jump from 647 to 928 calls. "In fact, even as I draft this letter, another individual is recovering from a stabbing that occurred at that address yesterday."

In response, the restaurant announced it would shut down from 10pm to 6am each night, close its back door, and hire additional security guards. Ottawa's mayor, Jim Watson applauded the move, saying "far too many police resources were being spent in that restaurant". City councillor Mathieu Fleury claimed the owner had resisted security improvements such as surveillance cameras and a layout change. The building manager denied responsibility and attributed the crime to "social issues out of their control".

== Closure ==
In January 2023, the Rideau Street McDonald's franchisee decided to not renew the lease. The restaurant closed in May after 38 years in business. Ottawa's mayor, Mark Sutcliffe, said he had regularly dined at the Rideau McDonald's on Friday nights as a teenager, and expressed positivity about the future of the area and its new police hub plans.

A crowd of about 200 people gathered to memorialize the institution with the "Rideau McDonalds Farewell March" in March 2023. Some carried signs of raccoons and some dressed in costumes including Ronald McDonald, French fries, the Hamburglar, and a raccoon. The event raised money for local housing charities such as Operation Come Home and Shepherds of Good Hope. The organizer, Keith de Silvia-Legault, who was a University of Ottawa student, expressed hope that the next tenant "doesn’t attempt to hide from the memory of its predecessor — but rather, embraces it".

In 2024, a Cantonese restaurant named 99 VIP Seafood signed a lease and became the location's next tenant. It opened in September 2025 and closed in March 2026. McDonald's Canada is open to reopening in downtown Ottawa, the CEO said in November 2024.

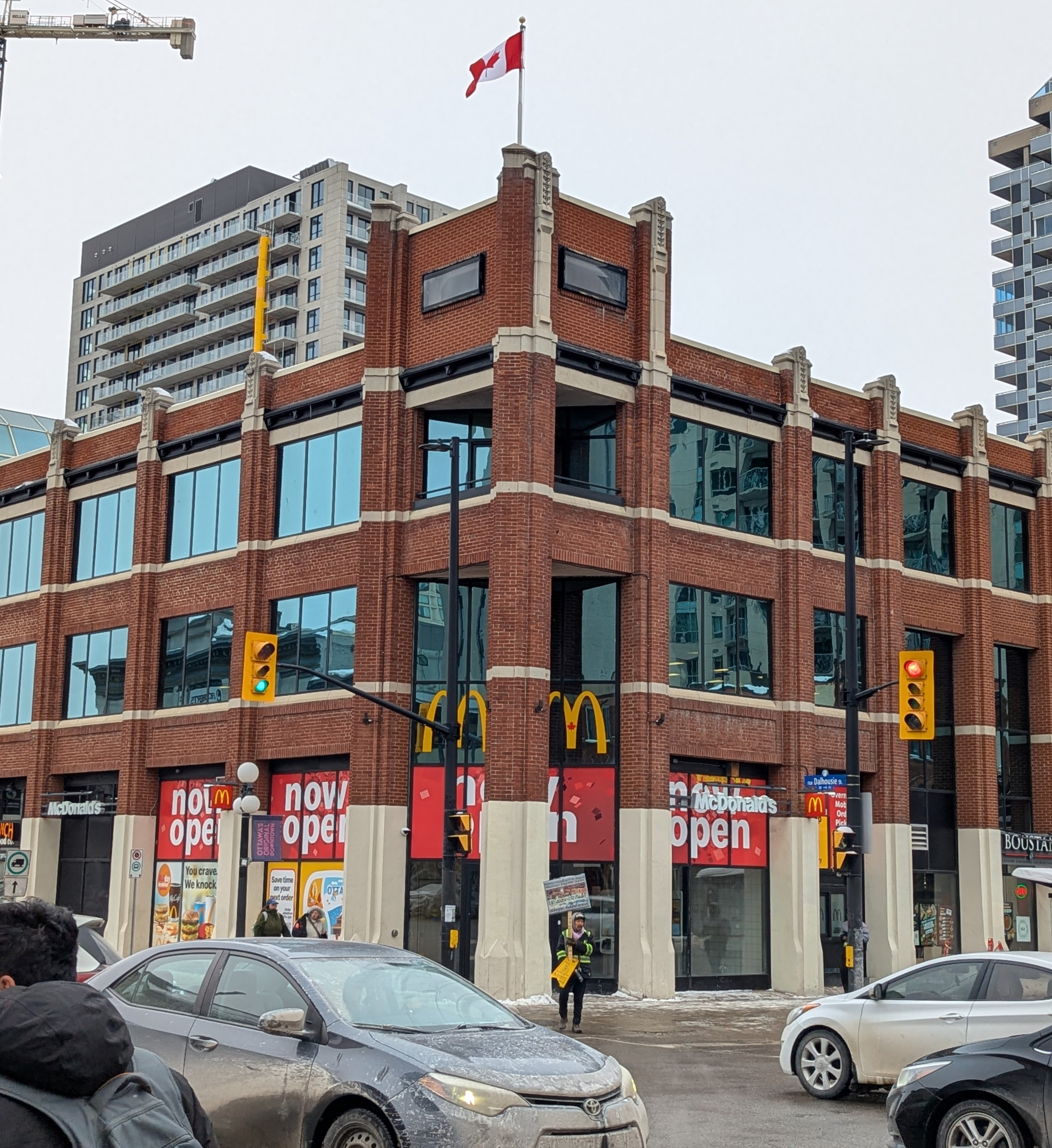
The new Rideau Street McDonald's in 2026

== 377 Dalhousie St. ==
In November 2025, it was announced that a new McDonald's location was set to open at 377 Dalhousie Street, at the intersection of Dalhousie and Rideau Street. The location officially opened in December of the same year, notably with the owners of the franchise commemorating the occasion by making a donation to "a local raccoon rescue". The restaurant is takeout only in order to combat the issues that prompted the closure of the previous location. Rideau-Vanier Ward councillor Stéphanie Plante supported this opening, hoping that with some changes the new location will benefit the local economy.
