= McDonald's Canada =

Canadian subsidiary of American fast food company McDonald's

McDonald's Restaurants of Canada, Limited
- Logo used since 2009

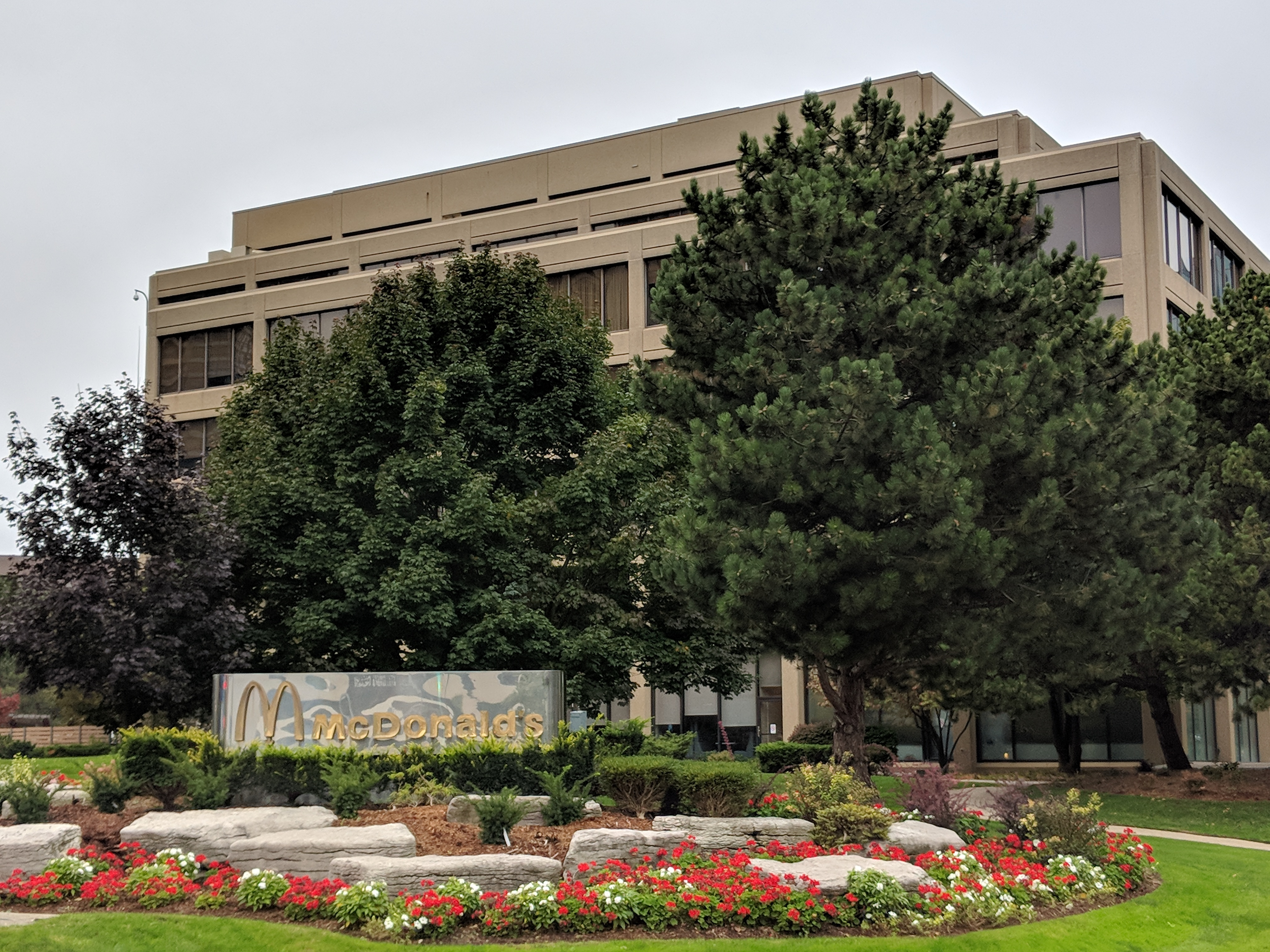
- McDonald's head office in Toronto in 2018
- Type: Subsidiary
- Industry: Restaurant
- Genre: Fast food
- Founded: 1967; 59 years ago, in Richmond, British Columbia, Canada
- Founder: George Cohon
- Headquarters: 1 McDonald's Place, North York, (Note: The City of North York was formally dissolved in 1998, when it was amalgamated with the other lower-tier municipalities of Metropolitan Toronto to form the single-tier City of Toronto government.) Ontario, Canada
- Number of locations: 1,466 (2023)
- Area served: Canada
- Key people: Michèle Boudria, President; Jacques Mignault, Chief Operating Officer
- Services: Master franchise
- Number of employees: 90,000+ (2022)
- Parent: McDonald's Corporation
- Website: mcdonalds.com/ca/en-ca.html

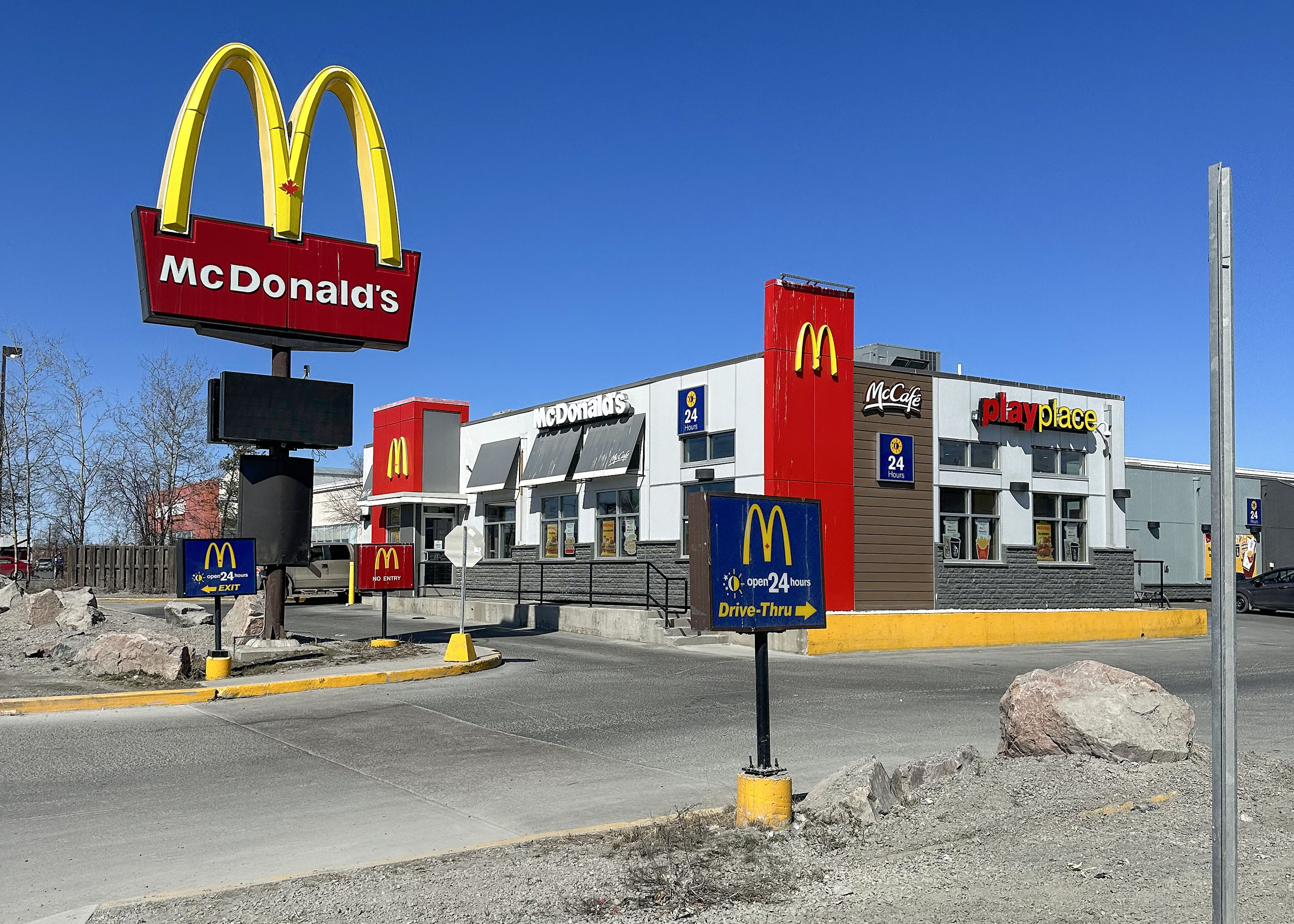
McDonald's restaurant in Yellowknife, Northwest Territories

McDonald's Restaurants of Canada, Limited (French: Les Restaurants McDonald's du Canada Limitée, nicknamed McDo) is the Canadian master franchise of the fast-food restaurant chain McDonald's, owned by the American parent McDonald's Corporation. One of Canada's largest fast-food restaurant chains, the franchise sells food items – including hamburgers, chicken, French fries and soft drinks – all across the country. McDonald's is known for its high fat and calorie foods. McDonald's was Canada's largest food-service operator before being overtaken by Tim Hortons in 2005.

The logo of McDonald's in Canada can be identified by the red maple leaf on the company's golden arches. The slogans used in Canada are i'm lovin' it in English and c'est ça que j'm in French. McDonald's Canadian operations are headquartered in the North York area of Toronto, Ontario. The current president and CEO of McDonald's in Canada is Michèle Boudria. As of 2022, McDonald's Canada had 1,462 stores (including restaurants inside many Walmart Canada locations) in Canada, and more than 90,000 Canadian employees.

== History ==
Chicago-born George Cohon founded the company. The first store opened in 1967 in Richmond, British Columbia as the Western Canadian franchisee and operated with the U.S. operations. Cohon was the Eastern Canadian franchise and opened his store in 1968 on Oxford Street West in London, Ontario. In 1971, Cohon merged the two operations to one national operation. Cohon was responsible for developing the eastern Canadian franchises.

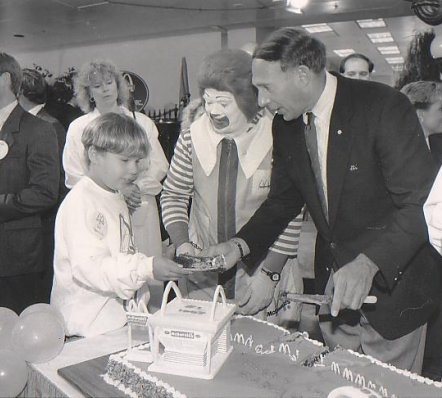
Opening of the 600th McDonald's Canada location at the SkyDome in August 1989; the McDonald's location has since been replaced by office space.

McDonalds Canada was a food sponsor at EXPO 86 in Vancouver with their floating restaurant nicknamed the McBarge.

In 1989, McDonald's was awarded the concessionary rights to the newly built SkyDome in Toronto. One of the requirements was to sell hotdogs, resulting in the first time McDonald's sold the product. Part of the stadium also included the largest McDonald's in Canada. The now closed restaurant was located at the base of the CN Tower. In 1993, the franchise briefly sold hot dogs outside the venue at reduced prices and in unlabelled carts, which was criticized by the other 25 hot dog vendors. The first PlayPlace opened in Niagara Falls, Ontario in 1995.

The flagship location opened in 2013 near Yonge-Dundas Square (now Sankofa Square) in Toronto. Poutine was launched as a menu item nationally in 2013 (it was previously available only in Quebec). In 2015, the company noted reduced customer traffic. That same year, salads were launched, with sodium and fat content that were comparable to other menu items. Salads were then discontinued during the COVID-19 pandemic in Canada. In 2021, locations in Ontario attached COVID-19 vaccine flyers to takeout orders.

In February 2025, following the 4 Nations Face-Off with Canada and the United States, McDonald's Canada temporarily renamed two restaurants in Edmonton, Alberta and Newmarket, Ontario to McDavid's, named after Edmonton Oilers captain Connor McDavid.

== Scandals ==
McDonald's Canada was criticized for its use of the Temporary Foreign Workers Program. These workers could be paid less than other employees, which is attractive to employers wishing to cut costs. Three of its franchises in Victoria, British Columbia were federally investigated for their use of the program. McDonald's Canada also stated that it would conduct a review. In a conference call to the franchisees about the program, McDonald's Canada CEO John Betts stated: "the fact of the matter is we are a big bad company corporate you know, bad company. And these poor maligned employees, are who they are ... This has been an attack on our brand ... This is an attack on our people. It's bullshit." These locations had their permits for the program suspended during the investigation.

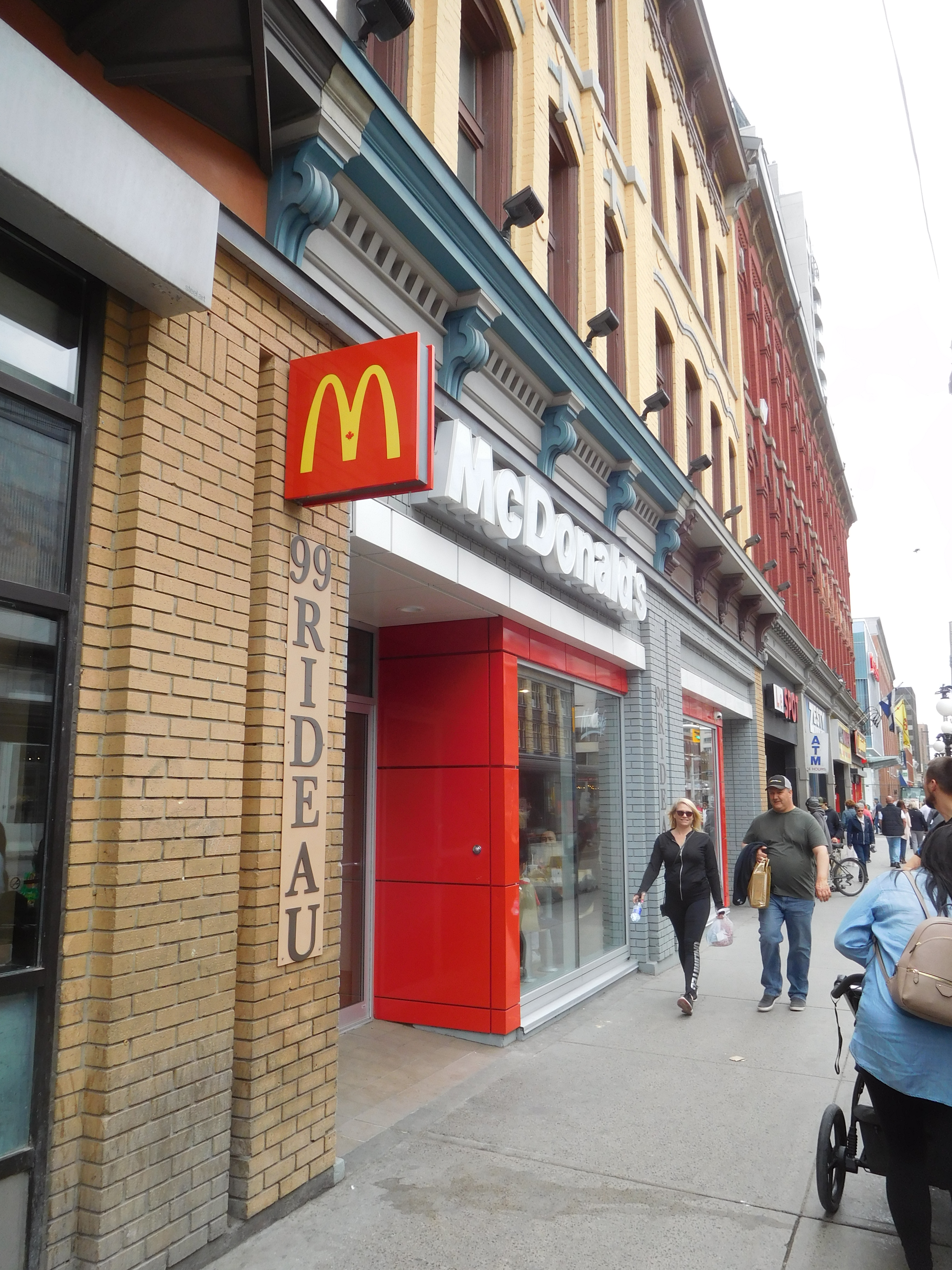
Rideau McDonald's in Ottawa, Ontario, Canada, dubbed the "World's Worst McDonald's"

On May 1, 2023, a McDonald's franchise in Ottawa, referred to as the Rideau Street McDonald's due to its location at 99 Rideau Street, was closed indefinitely after the franchise owners chose to not renew their lease. The Rideau McDonald's had been dubbed as the "World's Worst McDonald's" by the Toronto Star due to its reputation of being a "flashpoint for crime". In April 2019, Ottawa Police Chief, Charles Bordeleau, wrote a letter to McDonald's Canada CEO, stating that "Officers of the Ottawa Police Service attend this location on a daily basis to address issues including vagrancy, liquor licence violations, illicit drug use, and incidents of violence," and that he believed the 99 Rideau location was "breaching your standards of operation". In response, McDonald's Canada reduced the restaurants hours from 24 hours to 6 am to 10 pm. In January 2023, the Rideau McDonald's franchise owners stated that they were not renewing their lease and the restaurant would close. In response to the closure, a group of University of Ottawa students organized a fundraiser and food drive referred to as the Rideau McDonald's Farewell March on March 19, 2023. The Farewell March had over 200 attendees and raised over $1,900 for local charities such as Operation Come Home.

== See also ==
- List of McDonald's products
- List of hamburger restaurants
- McDonald's in Russia - Founded by George Cohon in 1990
