= Maggie Hope Braun =

Canadian COVID-19 mandate protester

Margaret Hope Braun is a Canadian activist who protested COVID-19 vaccine-mandates in 2022, and who was a Canadian Action Party federal candidate in 2011.

== Early life and education ==
Braun was born in Bracebridge, Ontario and spent her early years in Papua New Guinea before spending her teenage years in Canada, the United States, and Saint Lucia.

After graduating college with a diploma in ecosystem management from Fleming College, she moved to British Columbia.

== Career ==
Braun was Canadian Action Party's candidate for the Skeena—Bulkley Valley riding in the 2011 Canadian federal election. During the campaign she spoke about the public's rejection of the Enbridge pipeline. She won 164 votes (0.5% of those cast), losing to Nathan Cullen.

In 2013, Braun was the Vice President of the Green Thumb Garden Society of Terrace Inc.

== Activism ==
Braun attended the Canada convoy protest in 2022. She was arrested by police as they were shutting down the protest, and was warned by police, but not charged with any offences.

On November 4, 2022, Braun testified at the Public Order Emergency Commission, that she felt her presence at the protest was lawful. She also testified that she understood the Emergencies Act to be not legally enforceable.

== Personal life ==
Braun lived in Jack Pine Flats, near Terrace, British Columbia for ten years, including during 2011. In 2022, she lived in Peterborough, Ontario.

== See also ==
- Timeline of the Canada convoy protest
