= William Komer =

Canadian business person

William Komer (born 1988 or 1989) is a Canadian businessman and is a director and the chair of The United People of Canada organization.

== Early life and education ==
Komer studied computer science at the University of Western Ontario, where he earned the honour of three-time Academic All-Canadian while competing as a varsity athlete on the Western Mustangs Men’s Cross Country Team. Academic All-Canadian distinction is considered to be one of the highest recognitions for a university varsity athlete.

== Career ==
Komer owns five businesses located around London, Ontario including Campus Creative website company and Under the Umbrella wedding photography company. In 2016, at the age of 27, he proposed that Campus Creative purchase the empty Lorne Avenue public school in London, to convert it into a "Intergenerational Community Centre", a project endorsed by Creative Age London and backed by an accredited investor.

He is also a director and the chair of The United People of Canada (TUPOC) not for profit organization, that occupied Saint Brigid’s church and which has links to the Canada convoy protest. Komer signed an agreement on behalf of TUPOC to buy the church for $5.95 million but the group failed to pay the deposit prior to being evicted.

Komer attended the Canada convoy protest, and told the Ottawa Citizen newspaper that he did so "as a documentary filmmaker".

== Personal life ==
Komer was aged 27 in 2016.
