= Tony Cuzzocrea =

Italian-Canadian financial advisor

Tony Cuzzocrea (born 1942 or 1943) is an Italian-Canadian financial advisor, the founder of Planmar Financial Corp and Planmar Foundation, a co-founder of Love First, and the biggest individual financial supporter of The United People of Canada.

== Early life and education ==
Cuzzocrea was born in 1942 or 1943 in Italy to poor parents. At the age of ten years his parents relocated his family, including his three siblings, to Canada. In Canada, his father worked as a street sweeper. Cuzzocrea's first job was shining shoes at the age of eleven years; as a child he also worked in a bowling alley and had summer jobs picking tobacco in Mount Brydges and working for his father doing residential renovations.

He studied production management at Ryerson Polytechnic University.

== Career and philanthropy ==
After graduation Cuzzocrea worked at General Motors, but was laid off after three months. After fourth months studying and getting accreditation, he started a fifteen years stint as an employee in the financial industry before launching his own firm, Planmar Financial Corp. He founded the Planmar Foundation around 1998 and co-founded the Love First group in 2016. As of 2022 he rented offices former St. Peter's School on Clarence Street, London, Ontario.

Cuzzocrea is the largest single financial supporter of The United People of Canada not for profit organisation which tried to buy Saint Brigid’s Church in Ottawa in 2022.

== Personal life ==
Cuzzocrea has four children (Peter, Lisa, Ann, and Mary) and, as of 2013, has nine grandchildren. He was a friend of Arpad Horvath, who was killed by serial-killer nurse Elizabeth Wettlaufer in 2014.
