= Seaton House =

Homeless shelter in Toronto, Ontario, Canada

Coordinates: 43°39′36″N 79°22′27″W

Seaton House is the largest and one of the oldest homeless shelters in Toronto, Ontario, Canada. It is located at 339 George Street in the Garden District neighbourhood. The facility is owned by the City of Toronto and operated by the city government's Shelter, Support and Housing Administration. It provides temporary lodging, food, clothing, medical care, for single men and also attempts to provide tools for enabling them to establish their independence. The shelter houses up to 300 men though, in the past, it has exceeded capacity and housed as many as 900 men. The shelter is being replaced as part of the city's George Street Revitalization project, which is expected to be completed in 2029.

== Origins ==
The original Seaton House was opened in 1931 by the City of Toronto Department of Public Welfare at 320 Seaton Street in a 4 1/2-storey building, during the Great Depression, to provide a place to sleep and meals for transient men seeking work. The original facility was torn down in 1958 and the newly constructed facility, across the street at 339 George Street, opened on January 7, 1959 on the former site of the city's Boys’ Home, which had housed homeless boys from the 1870s until World War II and was demolished in the 1950s. A separate building at 339 George Street, originally used as a schoolhouse for the boys, still exists adjacent to the current Seaton House, and houses an emergency overnight homeless shelter operated by Dixon Hall.

== Facilities and regulations ==
There is room for 484 men in the main facility. 54 men are housed in the adjacent O'Neill House, a program for new refugees. During hot or cold weather alerts this facility is expanded to provide additional emergency shelter. An additional 110 men are housed in the Seaton House Annex through the Annex/Infirmary Harm Reduction Program. Until the 1990s, the shelter operated on a highly regimented basis imposing a series of rules and regulations including a ban on alcohol and requiring men to get out of bed by 5:15 am. A review of the shelter in the early 1990s was prompted by complaints of staff brutality and authoritarian regulations at the facility. Rules into the 1990s included a requirement to register for a bed by 1:30 pm. The hostel itself did not open until 4 pm and returning clients were expected to provide proof that they applied for at least three jobs during the day, the doors were locked at midnight and clients were expected to be in bed an hour earlier. Lights would go on at 5 am; breakfast was served at 5:30 am and 6:30 am and clients had to leave the premises by 7:30 am. Clients were expected to spend their days looking for work.

Seaton House provides bathing facilities, delousing, a barber, laundry and lockers as well as counselling and life skills training. Typically, a client will sleep in a large room with several bunk beds and shared bathroom. Three meals a day are provided. Clothing and shoes are available, if needed, as well as medical care from doctors and nurses.

Satellite residences are operated at the Birchmount Residence in Scarborough for men over 55 and at Downsview Dell in North York for men who have agreed to abstain from drugs and alcohol and attend treatment.

Funded by the provincial and city governments, the institution now operates on a 24-hour basis.

== Clientele ==
Over the years, the clientele changed from unemployed transients looking for what little work they could find to a population composed largely of men who have complex health, mental health and substance use issues as well as the disabled, refugees and others lacking family or community support have also ended up seeking temporary respite at Seaton House. In 1999, a sudden influx of Tibetan refugees resulted in 53 of them being provided temporary residence at Seaton House. In 2002, several youths from Uganda who arrived in Toronto to participate in the Catholic Church's World Youth Day were housed in Seaton House after they requested asylum.

== Harm reduction ==
Since 1997, the shelter has operated the Seaton House Annex Harm Reduction Program, a "wet shelter" operated in conjunction with staff from St. Michael's Hospital on the harm reduction principle. Previously, Seaton House banned alcohol forcing many homeless alcoholics to stay on the street using unsafe sources of liquor such as rubbing alcohol, cleaners, and industrial products. Under the new "managed alcohol" policy, alcohol-dependent clients enrolled in the program are served one five-ounce pour of wine every 90 minutes until it is determined that an individual is too inebriated, at which point he is denied another drink. The clients have been found to gradually reduce their intake under this regime and many have quit entirely.

The 110 beds in the annex are reserved for homeless chronic alcoholics. According to Dr. Tomislav Svoboda, a family physician attached to the program, it was opened as a result of the outcry that followed the deaths of three homeless alcoholics in the winter of 1995. Until then, welfare regulations prohibited alcoholics from receiving benefits. According to Svoboda, "The poor in Toronto essentially lived in prohibition. Many individuals were forced to make a decision between shelter and use of a substance." A coroner's inquest into the three deaths recommended the creation of a wet shelter.

After the introduction of the program, a study, published in the Canadian Medical Association Journal in 2006 found that serving chronic street alcoholics controlled doses of alcohol also reduced their overall alcohol consumption. Researchers found that program participants cut their alcohol use from an average of 48 drinks a day when they entered the program to an average of 8 drinks and that their trips to hospital emergency rooms drop to an average of eight a month from 13.5 while encounters with the police fall to an average of 8.8 from 18.1.

== Relations with neighbourhood ==
Seaton House is blamed by some Cabbagetown residents for contributing to the deterioration of George Street and the surrounding area. The stretch of George Street between Dundas Street and Gerrard Street where Seaton House is located has been dubbed "crack alley" by neighbours. Community members allege that Seaton House does not properly supervise its residents who, they claim, can be seen on the street outside the facility dealing and smoking crack cocaine. Toronto's director of hostel services rejects the charge of neglect saying that Seaton House and the city "work closely with Toronto Police Services to address the issue of drug dealers who may prey on the men that use the Seaton House program."

== Redevelopment ==
In 2009, Toronto City Council approved a proposal to redevelop Seaton House in partnership with nearby property owners. The proposal called for the demolition of the shelter and the redevelopment of George Street with commercial space, affordable housing, student housing and a redesigned shelter.

In July 2013, council approved in principle the George Street Revitalization project, centred on an integrated facility replacing Seaton House. Plans subsequently called for an emergency shelter, transitional accommodation, a long-term care home, supportive housing and a community service hub. The project was initially to be delivered with Infrastructure Ontario through a design-build-finance public-private partnership. It was delayed by the COVID-19 pandemic, rising construction costs, supply-chain disruptions and labour shortages.

In February 2024, council ended the city's agreement with Infrastructure Ontario and directed staff to develop a city-managed approach that could be completed within the approved budget. In April 2025, council approved a revised two-phase plan. The first phase, occupying the northern two-thirds of the site, is to contain an 80-bed emergency shelter, 100 transitional spaces, a 124-bed long-term care home, 70 supportive-housing units and a 2,269-square-metre (24,420 sq ft) community hub. Three designated heritage buildings are to be incorporated into the development. The southern third of the property was reserved for a possible second phase of affordable housing, subject to further planning and funding.

The first phase had an approved capital budget of approximately $556.4 million, excluding $54.4 million allocated separately for the supportive-housing component. As part of the transition plan, Seaton House residents have been progressively relocated to new shelter programs and permanent housing. By March 2025, four replacement shelter programs had opened, while an additional 80-space facility at 2299 Dundas Street West was under construction. Two shelter programs are intended to return to George Street when the redevelopment is completed. In July 2025, the city awarded the project's design contract to Montgomery Sisam Architects. Construction was scheduled to begin in late 2026, with completion expected in 2029.
