= George Street (Toronto) =

Street in Toronto, Ontario, Canada

Coordinates: 43.65333°N 79.3718°W

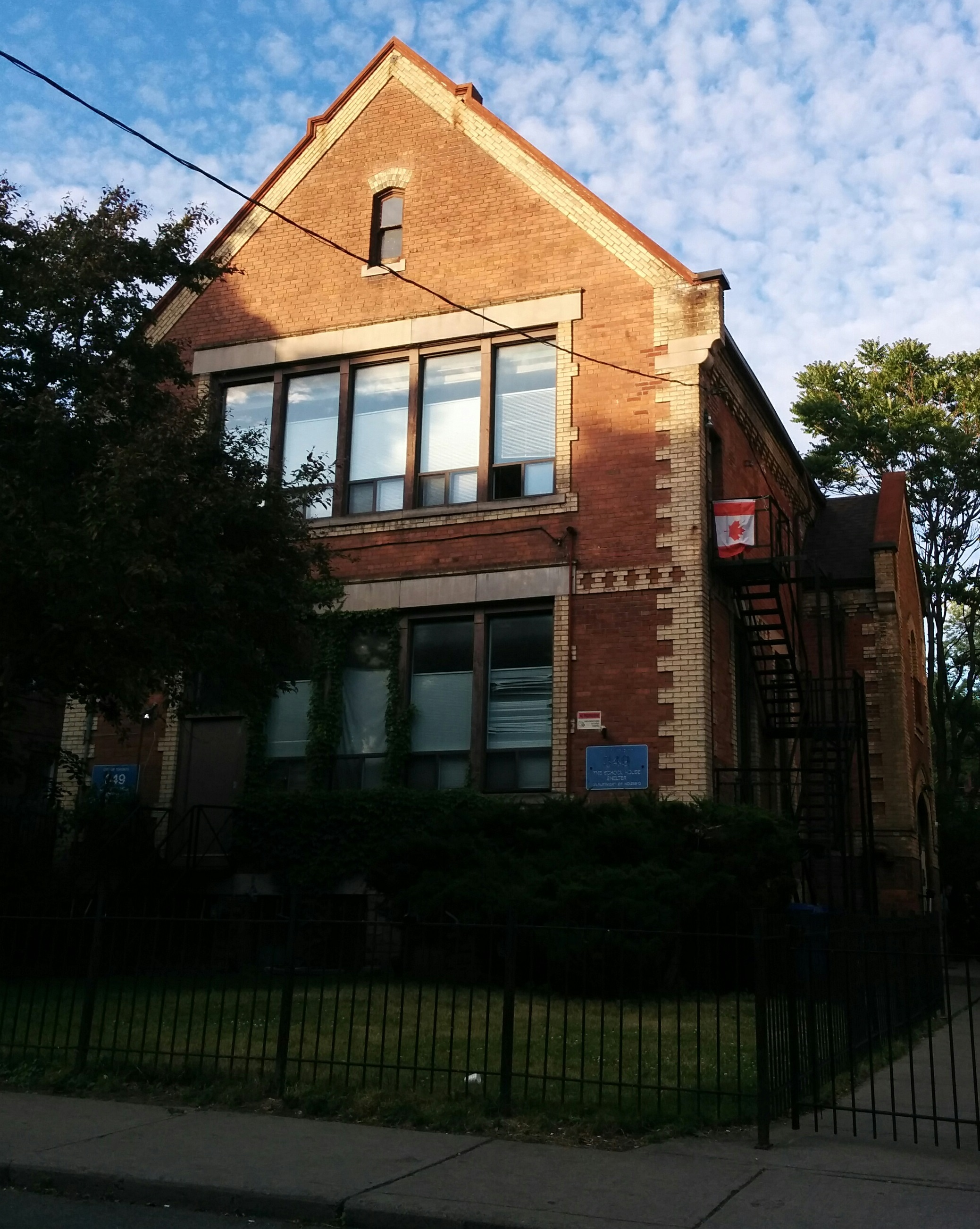
The former Allan School (1910) at 349 George Street, one of several heritage buildings on the street

George Street is a north–south street in Toronto, Ontario, Canada, from south of Front Street, north to Gerrard Street. Its southern blocks are within the grid of the townsite of the original town of York, Upper Canada. George Street was once one of the most exclusive and expensive addresses in the city. Today, the north end of the street, next to Seaton House men's shelter, is an example of urban blight. The City of Toronto government is redeveloping the street with a new Seaton House institution focused more on long-term care. Several abandoned buildings have been bought by the city, and others have been expropriated to facilitate the redevelopment – the George Street Revitalization Project.

== Description ==
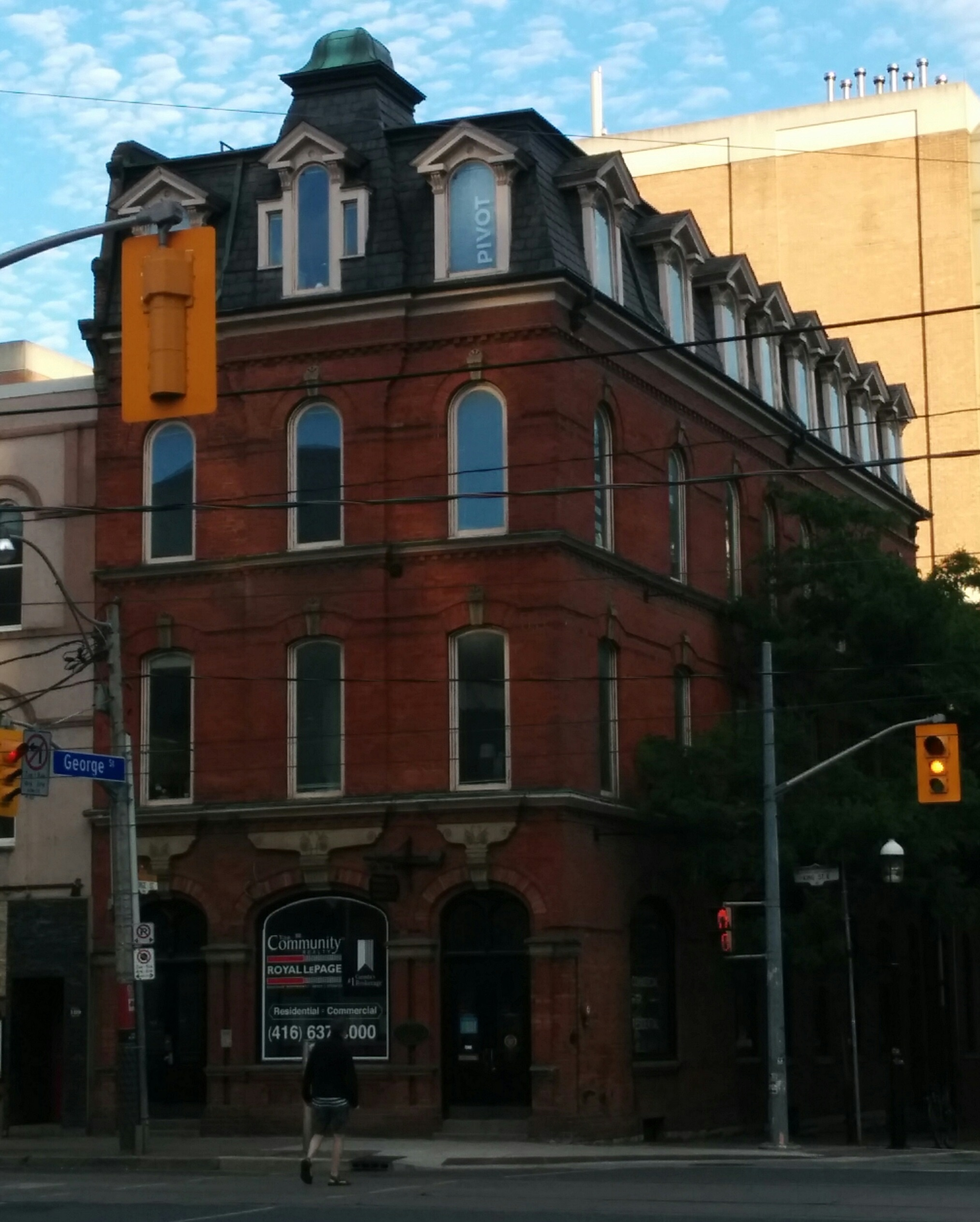
Little York Inn at King and George

Throughout almost all of its length, the street is a two-lane north–south street. The street begins in the south as "George Street South", part of a 1980s-era housing development south of Front Street. The housing development (The St. Lawrence Neighbourhood) is composed of mid-rise condominium towers, co-operatives and community housing, as well as some townhomes. The street continues north of Front Street as "George Street". On the north-east corner of Front is another 12-floor condominium development. Proceeding north, on the west side, is the circa 1840 Thomas Thompson Building that adjoins the south side of King Street. At the corner is the Little York Inn, dating from c. 1880. Behind it, at 65 George Street, is the inn's former stable. Many blocks on the street have Victorian-style 'gas-lamp' street lights as part of the "Old Town" district.

North of King Street, the King George Square condominium building takes up most of the west side. The east side is the St. James campus of George Brown College. On the south-east corner at Adelaide, the college occupies the former Christie's biscuit factory. North of Adelaide, the west side is another condo development (VU Condo). On the south-east corner, stretching north along George, is the historic Bank of Upper Canada Building, which dates to 1827. North of the bank building on the east side are former industrial buildings dating to the 1900s period, when the area was an industrial district. North of Richmond to Queen, the street has mixed uses on both sides. There is an old row-house of worker's housing along the east side. Halfway up along the east side is Britain Street, which bends to the south and east, marking the old riverbank of the now-buried Taddle Creek. George Street is currently interrupted for a block north of Queen Street by Moss Park.

One block north at Shuter, George Street continues north as a one-way street north to Dundas. On the east side is the former Duke of York Public School, which dates to the 1920s. It is now Ecole Gabrielle-Roy. The west side is residential townhomes and the back of a Jarvis Street apartment building and hotel.

North of Dundas Street (formerly Wilton Crescent), George Street continues as a two-way street, with local landmark Fillmore's Hotel (a strip club) on the north-east corner. On the west side is a Toronto Community Housing apartment building. Located on the east side is Seaton House (a large City-operated homeless shelter) and several heritage homes dating to the 1800s. Just north of Seaton House is the former Allan School (1910). Several of the houses on the east side have been damaged by fire and vandals. Seaton House, the former Allan School and these houses are currently (2017) part of the city's George Street Revitalization Project.

The street continues to the north, to its northern terminus at Gerrard Street. Across the street north of Gerrard is Allan Gardens.

== History ==
George Street was one of the first streets laid out in the original grid of Simcoe's plan for York of the 1790s. The street started at Front Street, which was then the waterfront, north two blocks to Adelaide. There are no buildings dating to that time period on the street, but there are several heritage properties dating to the 1800s. By 1827, George was extended two blocks north to Britain Street. As the Toronto harbour was filled-in during the late 19th and early 20th centuries the street was extended south from Front Street to the rail-tracks (now the rail berm.) The section of the street south of Front Street has been called George Street South since about 1980. By 1858, the street was extended north to Gerrard Street and the first homes appeared near Gerrard and the botanical garden.

During the 1800s, the north section of the street was part of George William Allan's property, the basis of Allan Gardens today. The street was a desirable address, and several fine houses were built on the street. In 1886, 295 George became the first international Fegan Boys’ Home. When it closed in 1937, it became the first Goodwill Stores location (now the site of VU Condominium). Next door at 297, the Salvation Army operated a rest home. As the town and city grew to the west, the area from Jarvis east below Queen Street became an industrial area.

In the later years of the 20th century, the area saw an influx of repurposing of old buildings and new condominium developments. The condominium and townhome developments replaced much of the older residential and industrial buildings. George Brown College - St James Campus - took over the former Christie's factory, and buildings on Adelaide and King Streets were restored. The gentrification of the adjacent areas of St. Lawrence, Cabbagetown and the "Garden District" has seen several residential homes on George Street repurposed and restored.

During the 1980s and 1990s, a developer assembled several of the homes on the east side of George Street north of Dundas for development but was unable to proceed without all of the houses in the row. The old houses, dating to the 1800s, were finally left abandoned. Several fires attributed to squatters gutted the interiors of several. According to one Toronto Star report, the block decayed so badly that locals referred to the area as "little Detroit".

In 2014 and 2015, the City of Toronto stepped in to purchase and expropriate several of the properties, which have heritage designations, and added them to the Seaton House complex and the George Street Revitalisation. According to Councilor Kristyn Wong-Tam, “There is no other street comparable to George Street. I have yet to meet anyone who is not alarmed to see the conditions.” She wrote that the northern section of the street should be "prime real estate", due to heritage properties and being close to Ryerson University. The Star report concluded that the city's purchase of derelict heritage properties could mark a turning point for the street. Several residents have noted that the emergency shelter part of Seaton House attracts drug addicts and criminal behaviour, and they hope to have the emergency shelter closed.

== Future ==
In November 2020, the city announced the George Street Revitalization Project, which would add new facilities to the northern end of the street. Seaton House, a dedicated men's shelter, would be replaced by a larger facility capable of housing more men, while adding a long-term care facility, and a community service hub intended for the whole community. The street furniture would be modernized, from Moss Park to Allen Gardens.

== See also ==
- Royal eponyms in Canada
