= The United People of Canada =

Canadian not-for-profit organization

- Formation: 2022
- Type: Nonprofit
- Headquarters: London, Ontario
- Key people: William Komer; Kimberly Ward (former); Diane Nolan (former)
- Website: www.tupoc.ca

The United People of Canada (also known as TUPOC and TUPC) is a Canadian not-for-profit organisation, based in London, Ontario.

TUPOC started the process of buying Saint Brigid's Church in the Lower Town neighbourhood of Ottawa in July 2022, launched its own private security force shortly thereafter, and was served an eviction notice in August 2022 after community objections, failing to pay the rent, failing to provide insurance and the sale of the building falling through.

== Organization ==
The group is partly funded by investment adviser, financial planner, and owner of Planmar Financial Corp, Tony Cuzzocrea. The organisation's directors are William Komer, Kimberly Ward and Diane Nolan. The organisation is a not-for-profit and describes itself as a "social enterprise" and as a "diverse, intergenerational fraternal organisation".

The organisation is also known by its acronym TUPOC, and occasionally as TUPC. It is based in London, Ontario.

== Reception by community ==
The organisation's attempted purchase of St Brigid's church was controversial in the community. Many residents objected to the support the organisation voiced for the 2022 Trucker Convoy protest in Ottawa. The organisation denies any connection with the convoy. The refusal of the group to vacate the church led to small, localised protests in the area, as well as small clashes between the TUPOC organisation and protesters. TUPOC organisers on several occasions used water guns on journalists and protesters. Local residents also alleged harassment from the organisation while they were based out of the building. The organisation frequently made threats of private prosecution against individuals it felt committed crimes against the organisation. TUPOC organisers claimed alleged police discrimination as the reason no protesters had been charged criminally, though complaints made of this nature against police were dismissed. As of 2022, no prosecutions by the organisation have resulted in charges.

== History ==
The organisation occupied and started the process purchasing Saint Brigid's Church in July 2022, converting it into what it called an "embassy". The historical building, a former Roman Catholic church in Ottawa’s Lower Town was deconsecrated in 2006 and sold. The new owners established it as a community centre before its planned sale to TUPOC in 2022. TUPOC director William Komer stated that the organisation plans to buy more former churches and schools. The conditional offer to buy the church subsequently fell though.

Responding to press enquiries, Komer also stated that the organisation was distinct from the organisers of the Canada convoy protest. The organisation shared its plans to create a cafe, a co-working space, and a stage for musical performances and events.

After reports of the theft of the organisation's banner and flags, the addition of graffiti, and the receipt of death threats towards members, the organisation created a private security force in August 2022. The same month, there was an online petition and poster campaign in Ottawa, objecting to the group's planned purchase of Saint Brigid's Church.

After accumulating $10,000 of rent arrears and failing to provide proof of liability insurance, TUPOC was served an eviction notice on August 17, 2022 with bailiffs changing the locks on the 18th. Residents protested TUPOC's ongoing occupation of the church on August 21, 2022. On September 23, 2022, the Ontario Superior Court of Justice ruled that TUPOC had materially breached the sale agreement by failing to make required payments despite two extensions, granted the eviction application, and awarded $53,000 in damages to the owners.

TUPOC appealed the court's decision in May 2023 and the appeal was dismissed June 5, 2023. A panel of judges in Ontario's Divisional Court unanimously agreed that there were "a number of problems" with TUPOC's appeal, including misreading sections of the Commercial Tenancies Act which their case depended on.
