= Charles Bordeleau =

Retired chief of the Ottawa Police Service

Charles Bordeleau OOM

Chief of the Ottawa Police Service
- In office March 5, 2012 – May 4, 2019
- Preceded by: Vernon White
- Succeeded by: Peter Sloly

Personal details
- Born: Charles J. Bordeleau Ottawa, Ontario, Canada
- Spouse: Lynda Bordeleau
- Education: Royal Roads University (MA); University of Ottawa (BBA)
- Profession: Police officer
- Awards: Dean's Philos Award (2011)
- Police career
- Allegiance: Ottawa
- Department: Ottawa Police Service
- Service years: 1984–2019
- Status: Retired
- Rank: Chief of Police

Charles J. Bordeleau OOM is a retired Canadian police officer who served as the chief of police of the Ottawa Police Service from March 2012 until May 2019. Prior to this, he served as the city's deputy chief of police.

Born and raised in Ottawa, Bordeleau began his policing career in 1984, serving on numerous community organizations, including the Community Police Action Committee. He was also a member of the Canadian Association of Chiefs of Police Emergency Management Committee as well as the International Committee and the director for the Ontario Association of Chiefs of Police's Zone 2. He also co-chaired the "Operation INTERSECT" Steering Committee.

Bordeleau received the Dean's Philos Award from the University of Ottawa's Telfer School of Management. He received his Master of Arts degree in disaster and emergency management from Royal Roads University and a Bachelor of Business Administration degree from the University of Ottawa.

== Career ==
In August 2010, Bordeleau was appointed as deputy chief of police of the Ottawa Police Service. He held this position until March 5, 2012, when he was appointed as chief. He retired on May 4, 2019, and was succeeded by Peter Sloly.

- In 2020, Chief Bordeleau was called before the Human Rights Tribunal of Ontario to respond to allegations made by Cst. Khoa Hoang that as Chief, Bordeleau oversaw an administration of the Ottawa Police Service that racially discriminated against Cst. Hoang and harassed him in order to try to bully him into dropping his claims of discrimination.
- A civilian background investigator resigned in protest over Chief Bordeleau's controversial decision to hire a recruit of Somalian ancestry who had not passed the background check. Troublesome issues had been found in this applicant's background, including 16 traffic convictions, 4 license suspensions and an alleged effort to obtain a new Drivers Licence while suspended.
- Chief Bordeleau's office placed a phone call to Traffic Court enquiring who was prosecuting the matter involving his father in law, Lester Thompson ( himself a former Chief of Police of the City of Gloucester). The charge against his father in law was later withdrawn by the Prosecution and an investigation looking into wrongdoing later cleared Chief Bordeleau.
- Chief Bordeleau declined to investigate misconduct allegations against a fellow Senior officer in charge of internal affairs and who was allegedly a personal friend of the Chief.
- The Police Association President claimed that Chief Bordeleau has lost the confidence of his members.
- The Police Association launched a formal complaint alleging Chief Bordeleau mislead the Police Services Board regarding the use of private security presently being used in courthouses and that the privatization of the Ottawa Courthouse security was supported by the Attorney General. The Police Association claims that the Attorney General never gave such an endorsement.
- An unnamed Ottawa Police Service lawyer and at least two unnamed senior officers are investigated by the Ontario Provincial Police for evidence tampering and obstruction of justice in relation to criminal charges laid against their own members in a training accident.

== 99 Rideau and McDonald's Canada ==
In April 2019, Bordeleau wrote a letter to McDonald's Canada CEO, John Betts, sharing his concerns regarding a McDonald's restaurant at 99 Rideau referred to as the Rideau McDonald's stating "Officers of the Ottawa Police Service attend this location on a daily basis to address issues including vagrancy, liquor licence violations, illicit drug use, and incidents of violence," and that he believed the McDonald's location was "breaching your established standards of operation."

In response to Bordeleau's letter, McDonald's Canada reduced the restaurants hours from 24 hours to 6 am to 10 pm. The restaurant closed indefinitely in May 2023.
