= James Bauder =

Canadian convoy protest leader

James Ralph Bauder (born 1969 or 1970) is a Canadian truck driver from Alberta. He is the cofounder of Canada Unity and Founding organizer of the Canada convoy protest.

== Biography ==
Bauder (born 1969 or 1970) is truck driver, married to Sandra Bauder.

Bauder was involved in the United We Roll protest in 2019 that protested the Canadian federal government's environmental protection rules. Bauder has shared QAnon, and anti-vaccination views on his social media channels, where he also challenged the official account of New Zealand's Christchurch mosque shootings.

Bauder and his wife Sandra co-founded the Canada Unity group that protested public health measures during the COVID-19 pandemic. The group's Facebook page was registered in late 2019, during the United We Roll movement.

Bauder and less than 100 other protestors drove to Ottawa in October 2021 in a protest they called Convoy for Freedom before he was one of several people who jointly and loosely organised the January 2022 Canada convoy protest. Bauder was arrested in February 2022 as police were ending the Canada convoy protest. He was charged with disobeying a lawful court order, mischief to obstruct property, and obstructing a peace officer. His request to relocate his criminal trial out of Ottawa was denied in February 2023.

In November 2022, at the public enquiry into the Canadian government use of the Emergencies Act, Bauder testified that Prime Minister Justin Trudeau was guilty of treason and that God told him to start the convoy. Later that month, Bauder called for a second Freedom Convoy to Ottawa in mid February 2023. Bauder's bail conditions at the time of his call prevent him from visiting the centre of Ottawa.

In July 2025, Bauder reportedly applied for asylum in the United States as a way "to avoid standing trial in Ottawa". On August 31, 2025, a Canada-wide warrant for his arrest was issued after he failed to appear in court in Ottawa following a summons to face criminal charges for his role in the protest.

== See also ==
- Pat King
- Christopher John Barber
- Tamara Lich
