= Peter Sloly =

Former Chief of the Ottawa Police Service

Peter Sloly OOM
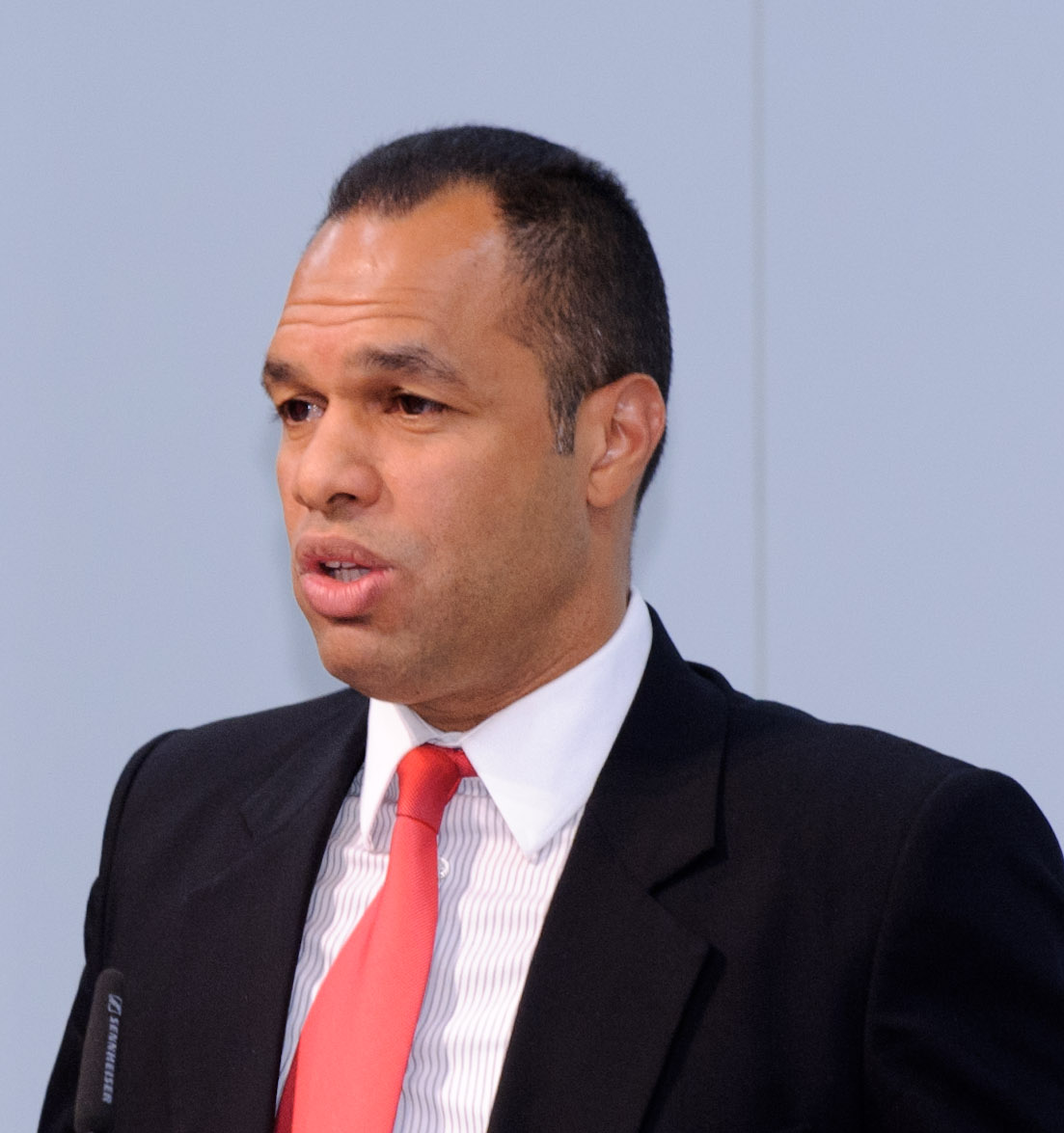
- Sloly in 2011

Chief of the Ottawa Police Service
- In office 28 October 2019 – 15 February 2022
- Preceded by: Charles Bordeleau
- Succeeded by: Steve Bell (interim)

Personal details
- Born: Peter John Michael Sloly; 5 August 1966 (age 60) Kingston, Surrey, Jamaica
- Citizenship: Canadian
- Education: McMaster University (BA); York University (MBA)
- Profession: Police officer; consultant; soccer player
- Police career
- Department: Ottawa Police Service (2019-2022); Toronto Police Service (1988–2016)
- Service years: 1988–2016; 2019–2022
- Rank: Chief of Police
Association football career
- Position: Defender
College career
Years	Team	Apps	(Gls)
- McMaster Marauders
Senior career*
Years	Team	Apps	(Gls)
1986	Toronto Blizzard		
1987	North York Rockets	19	(0)
International career
1984–1985	Canada U20	18	(0)
1984	Canada	1	(0)
- * Club domestic league appearances and goals

Peter John Michael Sloly OOM (born 5 August 1966) is a Canadian former police officer who served as the chief of police for the Ottawa Police Service (OPS) from 2019 to 2022. Before joining the OPS, Sloly was a member of the Toronto Police Service (TPS) for 27 years, including as a deputy chief of police from 2009 to 2016.

Prior to his police career, Sloly played soccer professionally, and made an appearance for the Canada men's national team in a 1984 friendly against Egypt.

== Early, personal life and education ==
Sloly was born in Kingston, Jamaica and moved to Scarborough at the age of ten. He has a wife and two children, a daughter and son.

He graduated with a Bachelor of Arts degree in Sociology from McMaster University in 1989 and a Master of Business Administration from York University's Schulich School of Business in 2004. Sloly also earned a Criminal Justice Certificate from the University of Virginia, an Incident Command System Certification from the Justice Institute of British Columbia, the Major City Chief's Police Executive Development Program, University of Toronto's Rotman Police Executive Leadership Program and is a graduate of the FBI National Academy.

== Soccer career ==
He is also a former soccer player who earned one cap for the Canadian national side against Egypt in a friendly match on 2 November 1984. He also played with the Canada men's national under-20 soccer team in the 1985 FIFA World Youth Championship. In 1986, he played in the National Soccer League with Toronto Blizzard. In 1987, he played for North York Rockets in the Canadian Soccer League.

In 2011, he was the recipient of the Canadian Soccer Hall of Fame's Brian Budd Award for leadership on and off the field.

== Police career ==
=== Toronto Police Service ===
After retiring as a soccer player, Sloly joined the Toronto Police Service in 1988, where he served for 27 years. In 2001 and 2002, Sloly served two tours in the United Nations Interim Administration Mission in Kosovo (UNMIK) as a Command Staff Officer and the Canadian Contingent Commander.

He was named deputy chief for Divisional Policing Command and Operational Support Command on 22 September 2009. At age 43, he was the youngest deputy chief in the history of the Toronto Police Service.

In 2015, he was a candidate to succeed outgoing police chief Bill Blair, but was passed over in favour of Mark Saunders, who was seen as more popular with members of the service.

In January 2016, Sloly gave a speech criticizing the size of the police budget as excessive, in which he said: "Until policing stops being focused and driven on that reactive enforcement model, it will continue to be exponentially costly." His comments were criticized by the Toronto Police Association, who also filed a formal complaint, and were viewed as a criticism of Chief Saunders.

On 10 February 2016 it was announced that Sloly had resigned as deputy chief and that he had approached the Toronto Police Services Board several months prior with a request that he be released from his contract, which was to have ended in December 2017. The head of the Toronto Police Association celebrated Sloly's departure. During his time in Toronto, Sloly developed a reputation as a progressive reformer reluctant to use harsher policing tactics.

=== Consulting ===
On 28 April 2016 Sloly was hired by Deloitte Canada to serve as a consultant handling risk and forensic practices projects.

=== Ottawa Police Service ===
In August 2019, it was announced that he would become Chief of the Ottawa Police Service, effective 28 October 2019.

A video emerged of an Ottawa police officer pulling over a Black man and accusing him of having expired plates in September 2020, resulting in public criticism of the Ottawa Police Service. The man filmed the encounter, including when he and the officer went over to the licence plate, revealing that it was in fact valid. The man accused the officer of racism, and both the officer and the Ottawa Police Service apologized. In response, Sloly directed every member of the Ottawa police to complete trainings on conscious and unconscious bias, anti-Black racism and racial profiling.

In June 2021, Sloly, in a personal capacity, sought $150,000 in damages from Ottawa Life Magazine for alleged defamation over a story in the publication's 10 March 2021 edition, which criticized his handling of misogyny within the force after women came forward with sexual harassment and sexual assault claims after a Deputy Chief was internally charged with harassment. It alleged that Sloly planned to only reveal the names of officers found guilty of misconduct against women in the force if their actions also impacted women outside the force. Sloly denied the allegations as false and malicious, and said that if he won his lawsuit, he would donate the earnings to the local Boys and Girls Club. In August 2021, Ottawa Life Magazine's lawyer, Mark Bourrie, said that the magazine would seek to have the suit dismissed under Ontario's strategic lawsuit against public participation law.

In 2022, the OPS and Sloly faced criticism for their handling of the Canada convoy protest, where thousands of protestors occupied much of downtown Ottawa, resulting in the desecration of monuments, street and business closures, as well as intimidation and harassment of residents.

Sloly resigned on 15 February 2022, following weeks of criticism for his handling of the protests. His OPS contract was due to end in 2024, and he was paid the remainder of contract in full. Sloly has been described as a scapegoat for the situation, by Ottawa Councillor Catherine McKenney, noting various key city staff that did not offer support during the occupation.

== Honours ==
- Member promoted Officer of the Order of Merit of the Police Forces
- Queen Elizabeth II Diamond Jubilee Medal
- Police Exemplary Service Medal
- United Nations & Canadian Peacekeeping Medals — UNMIK Kosovo
- Brian Budd Award: 2011
