= Managed alcohol program =

Harm-reduction program for chronic alcoholics

The 2010 ISCD study "Drug Harms in the UK: a multi-criteria decision analysis" found that alcohol scored highest overall and in economic cost, injury, family adversities, environmental damage, and community harm.

A managed alcohol program is a program meant to reduce harm for chronic alcoholics. The program involves providing a regular dose of alcohol to individuals with alcohol addiction, typically at a shelter-based harm reduction centre.

The centres operating a managed alcohol program are distinct from typical homeless shelters. The latter usually enforce abstinence from alcohol, whereas the former permit alcohol consumption "in managed doses or in specific areas". These shelters ensure that high-risk homeless individuals can avoid "exposure to extreme weather conditions, assault on the street, alcohol poisoning, or the substitution of non-beverage for alcohol products". They are also distinct from wet shelters, with criteria for admission and offering a greater breadth of services, such as on-site or referral medical, mental health, and social services.

Such programs enable individuals to reduce alcohol consumption, improve hygiene, and improve nutrition and overall health. Other benefits include providing the affected individual with community services and housing, a reduction in health care and emergency service expenses, and less time in prison.

== Background ==
In March 2006, the Canadian Centre on Substance Abuse published the report The Costs of Substance Abuse in Canada 2002, stating that in 2002 the costs to Canadian society associated with alcohol abuse to be $14.6 billion, representing 36.6% of costs incurred for all substance abuse (including tobacco and illicit drugs). These costs involved the loss of productivity, and the provision of services such as health care and law enforcement.

The report stated that between 8,100 and 9,100 deaths were attributable to alcohol abuse, representing over 500,000 potential years of life lost (PYLL). The leading causes of death were cirrhosis, motor vehicle collisions, and suicide. Deaths attributed to alcohol abuse represented 1.9% of all deaths in Canada in 2002. Alcohol abuse also resulted in over 1.5 million acute care days in a hospital.

Five broad categories of costs associated with alcohol abuse were identified in the report. Direct health care costs include acute care hospitalization ($1.46 billion), prescription drugs ($768 million), specialized inpatient treatment ($755 million), family physician visits ($173 million), ambulatory care ($80 million), specialized outpatient treatment ($52 million), and psychiatric hospitalization ($20 million). Direct law enforcement costs include police services ($1.9 billion), corrections and probation ($660 million), and court services ($513 million). Direct prevention and research costs include prevention programs ($34 million), research ($17 million), and operational costs ($2 million). Other direct costs include traffic collision damage ($757 million), fire damage ($157 million), administrative costs for transfer payments ($62 million for worker's compensation and $4 million for social welfare), and workplace health promotion ($17 million). The indirect costs are productivity losses from long-term disability ($6.2 billion), premature death ($923 million), and short-term disability ($24 million for reduced activity, $16 million for days in bed).

== Programs ==
The first managed alcohol program in Canada, the Annex Harm Reduction Program, was established in 1996 at Seaton House, the largest homeless shelter in Toronto. The program was founded as a result of the death of three homeless men in the city in 1995. Its target clients are homeless men with "difficult behaviours, mental illness or severe alcohol and drug problem". Individuals who are "too high-functioning" are not accepted into the program. These men receive one alcoholic beverage per hour at most, though staff may refuse to grant an inebriated client alcohol. They may also exchange non-beverage alcohol such as mouthwash or household cleaning products for beverage alcohol. Although permitted up to 15 alcoholic beverages per day, the average client consumes six drinks daily. Individuals who consume alcohol outside the program are not served alcohol in the program.

The program is administered by two full time registered nurses and case workers, and serves as a teaching program for St. Michael's Hospital. Since inception, visits to the emergency department have decreased 93%. In 2010, the program resulted in a cost reduction for the city of Toronto of $3300/day/client for emergency medical services, police, and health care services not utilized. Between 12–24 clients die each year in the program, typically "the culmination of chronic alcoholism, pre-existing health conditions and many years spent living in poverty and on the street".

The Managed Alcohol Program in Ottawa, opened in 2001, is a shelter for homeless alcohol addicts that provides controlled hourly doses of alcohol. It is operated by the Shepherds of Good Hope and funded by the city. Each client receives seven ounces of white wine upon waking, and five ounces of wine once an hour until bedtime. The goal is to prevent binge drinking and consumption of alternate stimulants, and to eventually graduate the clients to a "domiciliary hostel program" once their alcohol consumption has stabilized. A study conducted by the Ottawa Police Service tracked 23 individuals before and after admission into the program between 2001 and 2007. This group totalled 1074 incidents involving police, costing about $122,000, before admission to the program, and 53 incidents costing $6,000 after admission.

In Thunder Bay, the Kwae Kii Win managed alcohol program resulted in a 47% decrease in emergency service use and a 41% decrease in interaction with police. There was also a reduction in the number of people drinking non-beverage alcohol. Claremont House is Hamilton opened in 2005, and is located on the West 5th Campus of St. Joseph's Healthcare Hamilton.

In a 2011 study prepared for the South West LHIN in London, a domiciliary hostel managed alcohol program was expected to cost $45/person/day to provide up to 20 beds with one full-time nurse, one full-time social worker, two full-time equivalent registered nurses, six health workers, and an on-site physician for six hours per week. Including food, alcohol, and other expenses, the cost would be about $82/person/day.

== Criticism ==
Some have criticized the program as "giving up" on problem alcoholics by sedating them with alcohol, or that the free alcohol could attract individuals from outside the program area.

== See also ==
- Long-term effects of alcohol consumption
- Moderation Management, alcohol treatment program that aims to reduce consumption but not eliminate it
