= Shepherds of Good Hope =

Ottawa, Canada social service organization

- Abbreviation: SGH
- Formation: 1983
- Type: Organization providing emergency shelter, supportive housing and community services, including a soup kitchen for people who are homeless or housing insecure.
- Legal status: Non-Profit
- Purpose: To provide emergency shelter, supportive housing, and community services for people experiencing homelessness or housing insecurity.
- Location: Ottawa, Ontario, Canada
- Region served: Ottawa
- Official language: English and French
- President and CEO: Stephen Bartolo
- Staff: 200+
- Volunteers: 450+
- Website: www.sghottawa.com

Shepherds of Good Hope is a social service organisation based in Ottawa, Ontario. It is one of four homeless shelters in the city. Its client base includes people of different faiths, beliefs and genders. This organisations provides three main services: Support Services, Supportive Living and Shelter Services. Shepherds of Good Hope also operates a soup kitchen, and serves breakfast, lunch and evening meals.

== History ==
Established in 1983, the Shepherds of Good Hope started as an emergency men's and women's shelter and grocery program out of St Brigid's in Lower Town. In 1984, a men's shelter and clothing program opened in the Guigues School, and on October 1, 1985, the soup kitchen, shelter and the Clothing & Grocery programs all moved to their current location, on 233 Murray St, also in Lower Town. The building had once been host to St. Brigid's School. The first Christmas Hamper program was established a year later, in November 1986, and still continues today providing food to over 1000 families for Christmas.

In 1988, three new programs were created – Hope Outreach, Hope Community, and the Hope Centre. All three were targeted at providing housing, whether emergency or long term, for the clients of the Shepherds of Good Hope. In 1990, the Hope School, Hope Recovery, House of Lambs and Hope Discovery Supportive Housing were added to the resources available from the Shepherds of Good Hope (more on each below). However, two years later several programs were cut due to reorganization, including Hope School and House of Lambs.

In December 1998, Sophie's Hope was started as an effort to create an environment where women could feel safe and would always be accepted. Though not directly affiliated with the Shepherds of Good Hope, Sophie's Hope set up shop inside 233 Murray St.

In 1999, the Hope Community and Hope Discovery joined together to create a “Supportive Housing” system of care, which is today one of the three main services offered through the Shepherds of Good Hope. Thirty-two extra housing units were opened later in the year to accommodate people suffering from severe mental illnesses, and 18 housing units for people who required minimal care. In May 2000, the Managed Alcohol Program was introduced, to much controversy, as the experimental program provided participants with controlled amounts of alcohol instead of promoting complete abstinence. In 2002, funding allowed the Shepherds of Good Hope to provide a housing worker for the “Supportive Housing” program in an attempt to help people find and maintain housing. In 2003, the Shepherds of Good Hope celebrated its 20th anniversary, and opened up 10 new beds for the Managed Alcohol Program. In May 2004, the shelter purchased a building on St. Andrew St. with funding from the Ministry of Health, which became a part of Supportive Living. It allowed for 35 housing units to be built for clients who were diagnosed with a mental disorder, but independent enough to live on their own. A year later, Hope Community closed its doors.

In 2009, after several years of searching for a place to relocate the Supportive Housing, the Shepherds of Good Hope purchased an old hotel to move its residents that could be living in Supportive Housing but were still in the shelters, in an effort to remove people from the drugs so readily available in Lower Town Ottawa. Residents moved to that new Carlington location, and 55 units have been filled with clients. The building features 24-hour video surveillance and restricted access control.

In September 2021, the Shepherds of Good Hope opened their fifth supportive housing residence, the 42-unit Richcraft Hope Residence on Montreal Road. Funding was provided by the Singhal family, which owns the Richcraft Group of Companies as well as $7 million in fee waivers and grants by the City of Ottawa.

On January 29, 2022, during the Canada convoy protest in Ottawa, some protestors harassed staff and volunteers from the Shepherds of Good Hope into giving them food from the soup kitchen. After posting about the incident on Twitter, the organization received $750,000 in donations from more than 13,000 people by February 10. The Shepherds of Good Hope announced that the bulk of the funds would go towards two supportive housing residences under construction, which will house 105 people when complete.

== Staff ==
The Shepherds of Good Hope is run by a team of directors, staff, volunteers and donors & partners. The organization is governed by an eleven-member board of directors that oversees treasury, fundraising, accounting, and church affiliation.

== Volunteers ==
A team of volunteers also assists the organization. In 2018, 58,000 hours of work were contributed by over 450 volunteers for the Shepherds of Good Hope. Each individual is asked to provide one 4-hour shift per week for 6 months. Additionally, clients of the Shepherds of Good Hope put in over 7000 hours of volunteering around the shelter. Volunteer tasks are performed around the premises and include working in the Clothing Room, Drop-In Centre, Soup Kitchen, shelters and residences, and Women Stabilization Program as well as helping to put together Christmas Hampers. Clients of the Shepherds of Good Hope are also encouraged to help out in the Soup Kitchen and shelter. Certain volunteers offer their services in their specialization to the Shepherds. These include barbers, cooks, beauticians, musicians, and yoga instructors.

=== Partners ===
Corporate and community partners providing financial support and volunteers include Bell Canada, American Express, CHUM Media, and the Knights of Columbus.

== Funding and expenses ==
=== Funding ===
In 2008, Shepherds of Good Hope received 49% of its funding from the City of Ottawa, 14% from rent income from residents, 22% in donated food value, 20% in individual donation, 10% of volunteer contributions, 9% from Champlain Local Integrated Health Network, who also provided a grant, 4% in rent income and 3% from other miscellaneous sources.

=== Expenses ===
According to the 2008 annual report, the funds were distributed amongst the various programs and administration needs accordingly: 61% went to programs and services, 26% went to groceries, 7% went to real estate, 3% went to administration, and a final 3% went to amortization.

=== Fund raising ===
Fund raising efforts are run by the Shepherds of Good Hope Foundation and include:

==== The Annual Am Ex Golf Tournament ====
The Annual Am Ex Golf Tournament raises funds for the organization. The 2009 tournament raised $14,638 and helped with the purchase of the new Supportive Housing homes in Carlington, the former Cardinal Suites.

==== The Annual Hunger Banquet ====
2009 marked the 5th Annual Hunger Banquet for the Shepherds of Good Hope Banquet for the Shepherds of Good Hope. This year 445 people were in attendance, double the number from last year. Features of this year's banquet include the recognition of outstanding volunteers, musical entertainment, and the presenting of cheques for the Shepherds of Good Hope from Corporate Partners. This year's Hunger Banquet was sponsored by CHUM Ottawa, Telus, Deloitte, The Ottawa Police Services and the Ottawa Catholic School Board.

== Current activities ==
Currently the Shepherds of Good Hope host three main services: Support Services, Supportive Living, and a Shelter Program.

=== Support Services ===
Several support services are offered through the organization. These include a Soup Kitchen, The Grocery Program, The Clothing Program, Evening Drop-In Centre, The Christmas Hamper Program, and the Shepherds of Good Hope Van.

==== Soup Kitchen ====
Open 365 days a year, the Soup Kitchen serves 690 hot meals a day, and an additional 860 take-away sandwiches available every day. Started more than 20 years ago, the Hope Garden was created to reduce the constant shortage of fresh vegetable in the Soup Kitchen. Six lots at Kilborn Gardens were donated by the City of Ottawa, totalling about 6,000 square feet (560 m^{2}) of space. Hope Garden receives countless donations from providers such as Lee Valley tools, Home Hardware, Greely Sand & Gravel Inc. and seed suppliers. For four years, the Hope Garden has hosted an annual event for the community.

==== Grocery Program ====
The Grocery Program is a monthly initiative which offers emergency groceries to anyone in need. In 2008, 21,000 families in Ottawa benefited from the Grocery Program, for a total of approximately $440,000 worth of groceries. The foods provided in the baskets are reflective of community donations as well as seasonal availability for fruits and vegetables.

==== Clothing Program ====
The Clothing Program provides clothing and footwear to the guests of the Shepherds of Good Hope as well as to low-income individuals.

==== Evening Drop-In ====
The Evening Drop-In program operates from 5:30 to 9:30 p.m., providing meals, recreational activities, tutorials, and Alcoholics Anonymous meetings.

=== Shelter Program ===
The organization operates several shelter programs.

==== Emergency Men's Shelter ====
The Emergency Men's Shelter is a 24-hour shelter equipped with 102 beds and provides food, showers, laundry services and medicine storage for its residents.

==== Emergency Women's Shelter ====
The Emergency Women's Shelter is a 24-hour emergency shelter for women or transgender individuals who are over the age of 18. It is equipped with 57 beds and provides three meals a day, shower, laundry and hygiene supplies, safe-injection supplies and clean clothing. Through the Inner City Health Pilot Project, implemented in 2001 in partnership with other local shelters, Hope Outreach provides psychiatric nursing, medical services, and substance use assessments.

==== Hope Recovery ====
Hope Recovery provides 21 beds, food, access to hygiene, laundry and medicine storage for women and men under the influence of drugs or alcohol. Hope Recovery accepts clients from other shelters, Police Services, Ottawa Detox and hospitals. Furthermore, clients residing at Hope Recovery are encouraged to seek help for their addictions.

==== Managed Alcohol Program ====
The Managed Alcohol Program is partnered with the Inner City Health Project. Operating under a harm reduction model, the program provides participants with 5 oz. of wine or 3 oz. of sherry every hour, to mitigate binge drinking and the consumption of non-beverage alcohol substances such as mouthwash or paint The program serves individuals for whom abstinence-based models, such as Alcoholics Anonymous, have been unsuccessful. Questionnaires were handed out to the MAP participants as well, to record and properly study their past alcohol use, daily activities and health. The program began with 12 subjects, but has increased to 22. Studies conducted at the University of Ottawa after an average of 16 months participation from subjects showed that the number of emergency department visits, police altercations and alcohol consumption all lowered for participants of the MAP. It was reported that overall hygiene and compliance with medical care also increased. Additionally, the average of drinks per day for a single subject dropped from 46 to 8.

=== Supportive Housing ===
The Shepherds of Good Hope run four Supportive Living housing units, targeted at helping clients to become more independent, while still tending to their needs for support and supervision.

==== Hope Living Residence ====
Hope Living is a 35-unit residence for people diagnosed with severe mental disabilities. It is staffed 24 hours a day, seven days a week. Hope Living is made possible through the help of the following partnering agencies: Royal Ottawa Health Care Group, the Sandy Hill Community Centre, the John Howard Society, C.M.H.A., and A.C.T.T. The program assists residents with life skills development.

==== St. Andrew's Residence ====
This 35-unit housing centre contains both single- and double-occupancy units for clients diagnosed with a mental illness but who are independent enough to have a more independent lifestyle. Staff is only employed on as-needed basis, and only interested residents partake in skill training. The facility includes recreational clubs for residents.

==== Hope Living ====
Sophie's Hope is a women's shelter established by Francine Pelletier. Pelletier started this shelter as a homage to a woman she had been working with in the past, an IV drug user who had developed AIDS and was also pregnant. Pelletier came up with the idea of this shelter when she noticed that several establishments would not allow Sophie on their premises because of her active drug use. There was a need for a safe place where women could be allowed access regardless of their condition. Sophie's Hope is not an overnight shelter, but is open from 4 pm to midnight and provides a place for women to eat, enjoy entertainment, play a game of cards, or just enjoy conversation with fellow women. The program's operating hours are intended to offer an alternative environment to the streets. Although the Shepherds of Good Hope are not exclusively affiliated with Sophie's Hope, they allowed for the women's shelter to open in the main Shepherds of Good Hope building, at 233 Murray St., in 1998. Sophie's Hope has been at its own independent location since 2000.

==== The Oaks ====
In 2009, the Shepherds of Good Hope purchased two buildings in the Carlington area of Ottawa, which they have turned into housing for clients who qualify for Supportive Housing but are still living in the downtown shelters. Formerly the Cardinal Suites Motel, the new wellness centre has been named The Oaks, and strives to help its new residents with living in their own apartments, as well as promote wellness. Controversy has surrounded this project since news broke that 55 homeless people would be moving to Carlington. A meeting drew 250 people protesting the move, as they feared that the already existing prostitution problem would be made worse by what the homeless people could bring to the neighbourhood – crime, drugs and alcohol. Following the public consultation, 55 residents moved into the facility, which features 24-hour staffing and security surveillance.
