= Canada Unity =

Canadian protest group

- Formation: 2019
- Founder: Sandra and James Bauder
- Headquarters: Calgary
- Location: Canada

Canada Unity is a group that campaigned against COVID-19 mask mandates and vaccine passports during the Canada convoy protest.

Co-led by James Bauder, the group attempted to have the federal government of Canada brought down by the Governor General during the 2022 Canada Convoy Protest.

It planned to organize a second convoy protest in 2023, but cancelled its own plans due to security concerns.

== Organization ==
The group was founded by Sandra and James Bauder of Calgary.

The group's Facebook page was registered in late 2019.

== Activities ==
The group had a low profile until the January lead up to the Canada convoy protest, when the group organised protesters' travel to Ottawa and published routes to the protest location on its website. During the Canada convoy protest, the group tried to advance a memorandum of understanding (MOU) with Governor General of Canada Mary Simon to bring down the federal government of Canada and revoke COVID-19 public health measures, despite that being legally impossible for a governor general to do. At the 2022 Emergencies Act Inquiry, protest leader Chris Barber said he did not like the undemocratic nature of the MOU. The MOU attracted 320,000 signatures before being withdrawn by the Canada Unity.

By 2022, all other convoy protest leaders had disassociated themselves from Canada Unity.

The group planned a second convoy labeled "Freedom Convoy 2.0" and also "World Unity Convoy" of vehicles to Ottawa for February 17 to 21, 2023, but changed their plans in favour of Winnipeg in late December 2022. In early January 2023 the second convoy plans were cancelled due to security related issues.

== See also ==
- COVID-19 pandemic in Canada
