= Saint Brigid's Church (Ottawa) =

Roman Catholic church in Canada

Coordinates: 45.431363°N 75.690608°W

- Saint Brigid's Centre for the Arts
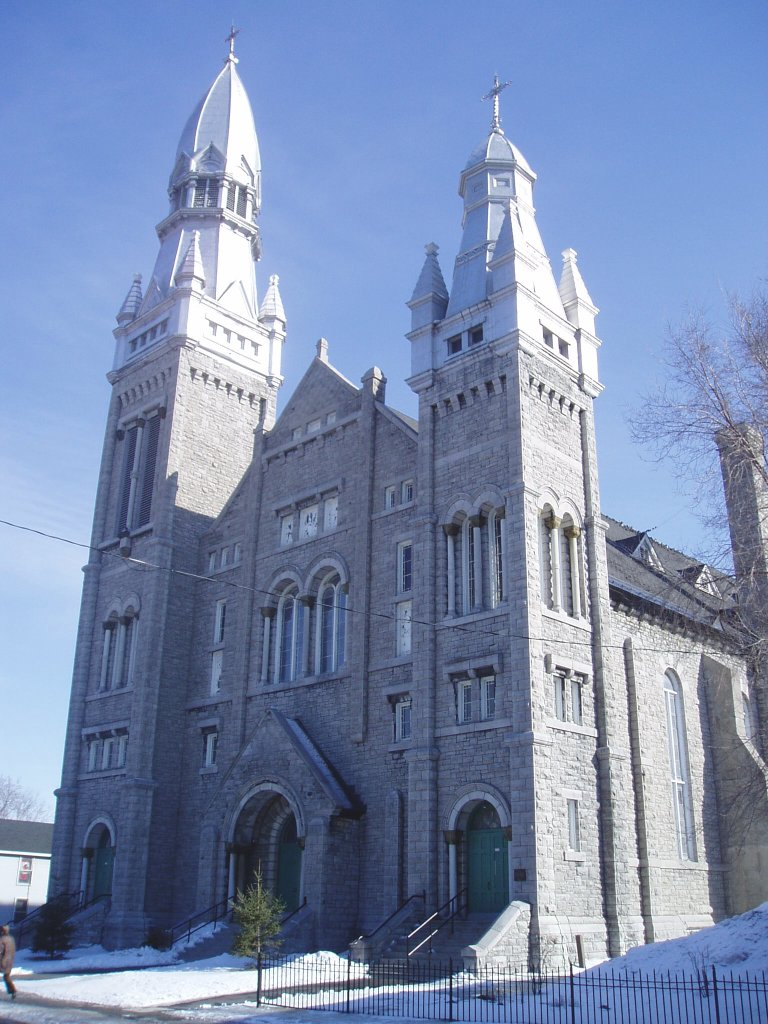
- Saint Brigid's Centre for the Arts, formerly St Brigid's Church
- Saint Brigid's Church
- Denomination: Roman Catholic
- Website: saintbrigidscentre.ca

History
- Status: Deconsecrated, used as arts centre and public event venue
- Dedication: Saint Brigid

Clergy
- Archbishop: Marcel Gervais
- Priest: Fr. Pedro Arana

St Brigid's was a Roman Catholic church located in the Lower Town neighbourhood of Ottawa, Ontario, Canada. It was built to serve the English-speaking, Irish-Catholic population of the area. The church's closing was announced in 2006, and it was sold in 2007 and converted into Saint Brigid's Centre for the Arts, an Irish-Canadian heritage centre.

In 2022, it became the focus of a rent dispute involving The United People of Canada.

== Church use ==
=== Parish History (1888-2007) ===
==== Early History (Late 1800s) ====
Before the opening of St Brigid's, a largely Irish-heritage community had formed part of the parish of Notre-Dame, the Cathedral of Ottawa. By 1870, the Irish percentage of the population had declined relative to that of the French-Canadians. As a consequence, the Irish played an ever-diminishing role in the life and management of Notre-Dame.

Discussions to establish a distinct anglophone parish and church for Lower Town began in March 1888. A committee of parishioners from Notre-Dame Cathedral held meetings with the Archbishop of Ottawa, the Most Rev. Joseph-Thomas Duhamel. Many Irish members of Notre-Dame parish expressed desires for a separate parish for the English-speaking members of the community, one in which would be able to cater to their specific spiritual and cultural needs and concerns. It was agreed to create a new parish; a site for the church chosen; and by May 3, 1888, James R. Bowes had been chosen as architect. The plans called for a substantial structure at the corner of St Patrick and Cumberland Streets. Built in the Romanesque Revival style (generally called Norman at that time), the principal façade has three heavy round headed portals and paired towers of unequal height and detail. The taller (eastern) tower is capped with a stylized bishop's mitre placing the church and its Irish parishioners squarely in the Ultramontanist tradition of the Catholic Church. Work began on St. Brigid's in 1889 and the Blessing of the completed Church took place on August 3, 1890. The interior architecture is principally Gothic Revival architecture, with influences of Irish Celtic architectural themes. The first priest entrusted to St. Brigid's was Irish-born Fr. Peter McCarthy.

==== 1900s - Present Day ====
The parish was a strong social anchor for the working class of Lower Town, Ottawa. In particular, St. Brigid's had significant involvement in Ottawa's local athletics history, and, along with St. Patrick's Basilica on Kent street, the two churches' respective athletics clubs were known collectively as the "Saints." The parish would often engage in various sports and athletics events. Playing as the Saints, they were known for their friendly city-wide rivalry between the "Gunners," who were Ottawa's Upper Town (predominantly Protestant) athletics branch of the local Ottawa Militia.

The parish had an active children's and youth community as well. In the early 1900s, the altar boys of St. Brigid's were known to have yearly sleigh rides throughout the city, in which they would travel to Alymer in Gatineau (Quebec) and return by the evening, singing songs along the way.

St. Brigid's Church was one of the earliest institutions in Ottawa to offer outreach and humanitarian services to the homeless of the downtown area. Through the work of Sister Eleanor Hennessy, a teacher of St. Brigid's parish school, this outreach movement evolved to form the largest not-for-profit emergency shelter in Ottawa, the Shepherds of Good Hope. The shelter is still in operation as of 2026. Various other lay societies were formed in the parish, such as the St. Jerome Sewing Society, which was known for making clothes for the poor.

==== Oratory of St. Philip Neri Community ====
In August 1987, an experimental traditionalist Catholic group of the Oratory of St. Philip Neri was established and operated out of St. Brigid's Church. The community, led by four priests, was originally supported by the archbishop at the time, Rev. Joseph-Aurele Plourde, who sought to see the community eventually formally erected in Ottawa. However, two years later, the opinion of the archdiocese shifted against that of the group, which it believed had become too divisive.

At first, many parishioners objected to the priest's use of traditional and solemn forms of the mass. The community had begun to attract many Catholics in Ottawa that were dissatisfied with the reforms of the Second Vatican Council, and who preferred the church's more traditional customs. Over time, the oratory group began to attract parishioners from neighbouring dioceses as well. Mass attendance at St. Brigid's began to increase significantly, along with greater parish turnout for vespers and chants. Members and parishioners of St. Brigid's argued against the archdiocese, claiming the Archbishop was suppressing the parish which had been invigorated by the traditional practices. The archdiocese, on the other hand, claimed that the attendance was a far cry from the claimed attendance by the parishioners. Other sources confirm large numbers of attendance, citing that hundreds of Catholics had attended the services.

Regardless, the Archbishop decided to terminate the community on the basis that the community was too divisive and controversial. Two of the four priests were offered by the Archbishop to be sent to two other parishes in Ottawa: Holy Rosary Parish on Wellington Street West, and St. Patrick's Basilica on Kent street. The other two priests were offered to go to Rome. The parishioners of St. Brigids protested against the decision, and tried to appeal to the Vatican, but were rejected. They claimed the Archbishop aimed to eliminate the authority of the priests and the community by aiming to split them up. As a protest, members of the community picketed the Archbishop's 15th anniversary celebrations. The archdiocese claimed the picketing as evidence of the community's alleged extremism. Eventually, the priests of the community were ordered by Archbishop Joseph Plourde to leave the archdiocese entirely, and the community came to an end.

=== Closure, Deconsecration, and Legal Conflict ===
In the early 2000s, various rising repair costs and damages to the roof structure placed strains on the financial stability of the parish. The costs of total repairs required were estimated to have been around $1.8-2.4 million CAD, according to Ottawa newspaper Ottawa Citizen. Additionally, it was proposed that these costs could be managed if spread out over long-term periods. In February 2003, the parishioners started a fundraiser aimed at raising over $700,000 in order to help support the restoration of the church.

In May 2006, Archbishop Marcel Gervais, finding the fundraiser to be in vain, announced the church's closure, citing that the shrinking congregation did not justify the several hundred thousand dollars in needed repairs. The parishioners of St. Brigid's, which comprised over 400 families, objected vehemently to this and even took the archdiocese to court to keep it open. Around 2005, the parish managed to pay off $126,000 in taxes to the archdiocese, and over $200,000 worth in annual operating costs. This prompted Archbishop Gervais to keep the parish open for a little longer.

However, the archdiocese resumed plans to close the church less than a year later. This was done despite receiving additional funding and support for the restoration of the church from the not-for-profit organization Heritage Ottawa, which had been pressuring the archdiocese to keep the church open over the years. The organization managed to secure a grant from the Ontario Heritage Trust of around $25,000 specifically for the restoration of the roof of the church, and had also written letters to the Archbishop himself requesting to keep the church open. The parishioners continued in their legal battle against the archdiocese over the closure, but did not succeed. They further claimed to take the matter to court on the basis that the archdiocese, allegedly, would not engage in negotiations or discussions with the parish community. In the aftermath of the ensuing legal battle, the archdiocese wrote a letter to the parishioners of St. Brigid's Church demanding to have them pay for the legal fees, which cost the archdiocese about $50,000. The parishioners took offence at the demands to pay the legal bills, calling it "a very unchristian thing to have done." The last mass took place on Monday, September 17, 2007, and the parish was deconsecrated.

One condition of the sale, as determined by the archdiocese itself, was that the building could not be used as a Catholic church, either by the buyers or their successors. As per the Ottawa Citizen, "the archdiocese has advised the parishioners to 'find closure' and move to another parish." Many parishioners were suggested to move to the parish of the Cathedral Notre-Dame de Ottawa, located just a few blocks down the street. Monseigneur Kevin Beach, the Vicar General of the archdiocese, affirmed that "the sale will result in 'appropriate use, respectful of the heritage value of St. Brigid's Church," as per a CBC news interview in 2007. Despite all of this, the Archdiocese of Ottawa later granted St. Clement's Parish, located several blocks from St. Brigid's, a $2 million mortgage to support the construction of a new parish hall.

According to of one of the buyers of the church, parishioners had intended to buy back the church one day in the future. However, as of 2026, this has not come to pass. In a final letter addressed to the people of Ottawa, the parish expressed its appreciation for the city's support in caring for the parish throughout its 118-years of history, and in its social support for the parishioners in against the archdiocese's decision for closure. The parish expressed strong distress and discontent with the archdiocese's treatment of the parish, along with historical neglect, but also expressed hope for the future of the church as an Irish cultural centre.

The last priest serving St. Brigid's church was Fr. Pedro Arana. He was known fondly by St. Brigid's Filipino community, of which many left the parish (following its dissolution) to follow him as he was assigned to another parish.

As the parish has been dissolved, most former members of St.Brigid's Church migrated to neighboring parishes, such as the Cathedral Parish, St. Joseph's Church, and St. Patrick's Basilica, while others stopped attending church entirely. The archdiocese had little involvement with the post-dissolution reorganization of the congregation.

== Secular use ==
In 2007, St. Brigid's Catholic Church was put up for sale. The deconsecrated building was purchased by four investors in the fall of 2007 for $450,000.

The church was purchased by a numbered company owned by former congregation member Patrick McDonald, a Portarlington, Count Laois-born man who moved to Canada in 1989. McDonald turned the building into the Saint Brigid's Centre for the Arts, an Irish-Canadian heritage centre and social venue hosting art exhibitions, plays, and concerts. On 6 January 2016, he opened a public house in the church's basement, called "Brigid's Well Pub," after the Celtic pagan goddess Brigid. In 2010, the building was used as a location for the filming of the 2011 film Sacrifice. McDonald played the role of Father Patrick.

In 2022, McDonald agreed to sell the church to The United People of Canada (TUPOC). TUPOC occupied and started the process of purchasing the building in July 2022, converting it into what it calls an "embassy". The conditional offer to buy the church subsequently fell though. McDonald accusing the organisation of breaking heritage rules, harassing other tenants and failing to pay the deposit. After accumulating $10,000 of rent arrears and failing to provide proof of liability insurance, TUPOC was served an eviction notice on August 17, 2022, with bailiffs changing the locks on August 18. On September 23, 2022, the Ontario Superior Court of Justice ruled that TUPOC had materially breached the sale agreement by failing to make required payments despite two extensions, granted the eviction application, and awarded $53,000 in damages to the owners. TUPOC appealed the decision and lost the appeal in 2023.

Church Interior. Taken in 2026 during an Irish cultural concert. Sea Shanties were sung with fervour upon the stage in the former sanctuary. Note that the purple lighting and stage lighting is not part of the original church infrastructure.

Closeup shot of the church sanctuary and high altar. The statue of St. Brigid is visible in the centre of the reredos.

Roof woodworking and Gothic arch design. The pillars follow in a similar style of the pillars of Notre-Dame de Ottawa, the nearby Catholic Cathedral which the parish branched off from.

Today the church continues to be used for Irish cultural events, and has become a significant community hub for the Irish community of Lower Town and Byward Market. Due to heritage designation, significant alterations to the church's interior is difficult, and so risers are used to form a stage platform upon the original sanctuary platform. As of 2026, most of the original hand-carved pews of the church have been completely removed.

The church has also been used as a venue for rock concerts, dance groups, banquets, sea shanty groups, and occult-inspired erotic cabaret shows, among others. The most common use for the venue today is for music and concert purposes.

== See also ==
- List of designated heritage properties in Ottawa
