= Operation Come Home =

Support centre for homeless and at-risk youth in Ottawa, Ontario, Canada

Operation Come Home (French: Opération Rentrer Au Foyer) is an employment, education and support centre for homeless and at-risk youth in Ottawa, Ontario. Their programs assist street-involved youth ages 16 and up. Operation Come Home first opened its doors in 1971, and was then known as Operation Go Home. They are located at 150 Gloucester Street in downtown Ottawa. They are a non-profit organization that receives no regular government funding.

== History ==
Operation Go Home was founded in 1971 by Reverend Norman Johnston, a United Church minister who had daily dealings with homeless youth in the area of his downtown church. He launched a program to reunite runaway youth with their families. Over time, this program went from being an Ottawa initiative to a Canada-wide system of reuniting youth.

=== Name change ===
In June 2009, Operation Go Home changed their name to Operation Come Home. The move was made to make the organization feel more inclusive so youth would access their services more often, and to reflect the changes in those services offered by the organization. The organization now included a school, housing services, employment services, addiction counseling, as well as mental and sexual health assistance.

=== Social enterprises ===
Operation Come Home has become known for innovative and successful social enterprises. The first one, BottleWorks, was launched in 2008. Youth were employed by BottleWorks collecting bottles from local restaurants and returning them for refunds. The restaurants were provided with a tax receipt, the youth gained some spending money and work experience. In 2011, the Ontario government issued an exemption to BottleWorks to allow them to participate in an exclusive deal delivering Beau's beer in Ottawa with the Buy Your Beau's Online (BYBO) program. The BYBO program has since been discontinued.

Two social enterprises are no longer in operation. BeadWorks was launched in 2009. Youth were provided with beads and used them to make jewelry, which would be sold at kiosks around Ottawa. With Operation Come Home's move from Murray street into a larger space on Gloucester street in 2011, BeadWorks became Re:Purpose, a storefront jewelry and craft boutique. The BeadWorks program also expanded to create new products and accessories to be sold in the storefront. Re:Purpose was closed in 2017. FarmWorks began in 2013 at the Just Food farm in the east end of Ottawa. Youth received hands-on experience working on a farm that produced vegetables and herbs for local restaurants and individual customers. Vegetable baskets would be delivered weekly to Ottawa residents. By 2016, the farm was being run entirely by the youth it employed. FarmWorks was closed in 2018.

The current social enterprises are BottleWorks, FoodWorks and ArtWorks. FoodWorks was launched in 2016 with chef Bruce Wood mentoring youth in the culinary arts. It began as a catering service that provides home cooked meals to subscribers in the Ottawa-area Mondays and Wednesdays. FoodWorks has discontinued the home delivery portion of their business, and now is solely focused on catering. They do office lunches and parties as well as larger events, including the Operation Come Home Poor Chefs competition every February. ArtWorks was also launched in 2016, in partnership with United World Voices. The ArtWorks program employs youth to make jewelry and clothing out of recycled materials, and has other activity components such as photography and poetry.

=== Fundraising campaigns ===
==== Reality campaign ====
In 2002, Operation Come Home launched an event called 24 Hours Of Homelessness. Participants spent 24 hours living outside in the middle of January to simulate the experience of homelessness and to attract attention. In the years that followed, the 24 Hours event turned into the month-long Reality Campaign, which now features several more events. From 2002-2007, the 24 Hours of Homelessness event was primarily an awareness campaign. Starting in 2007, a fundraising component was added where participants collected pledges for the organization while sleeping outside.

The $24 challenge, launched in 2013, had participants living on just $24 worth of food for a week. The number was calculated based on the amount the average youth at Operation Come Home received from the Ontario Works program. After all other expenses were dealt with, $24 was the amount left for food each week. The challenge was discontinued in 2018, as registration declined and one participant fell ill. Often, the reality campaign would feature a football party fundraiser immediately following the conclusion of the $24 challenge, as an event where participants could feast on Super Bowl Sunday.

The reality campaign now closes with the Poor Chefs competition. Launched in 2016, the first Poor Chefs competition took place at the Operation Come Home building. Top Ottawa chefs competed to make the best dish they could for just $3 and an item from the food bank. The first champion was Stephen K Lasalle. In 2017 the event moved to Ottawa City Hall, and was won by Harriet Clunie. In 2018 the champion was Kris Kshonze

==== Breakfast On The Rideau ====
A semi-annual event and fundraising breakfast that features guest speakers. Speakers in the past have been George Chuvalo, Dennis Hull, Theoren Fleury and Ashley Cyr

==== Ottawa Music Trivia Night ====
An annual event, held at the Sala San Marco Banquet Hall, where the proceeds go to Operation Come Home and another charity chosen by the organizers. Participants try to identify song snippets over ten rounds.
