= Craig Cohen =

Craig Cohen may refer to:

- Craig Cohen (political scientist)
- Craig Cohen (broadcaster)

== See also ==
- Craig Cohon, London-based Canadian businessman
