= Craig Cohon =

Global businessman

- Born: Chicago, U.S.
- Education: University of Western Ontario
- Occupation: Entrepreneur
- Years active: 1986–current
- Known for: Launching Coca-Cola, Cirque du Soleil in Russia
- Spouse: Jeanette Sundberg-Cohon (1992–2010)(divorced)
- Children: Two
- Parent(s): Susan Silver Cohon, George Cohon
- Relatives: Mark Cohon (brother)

Craig Cohon is a Canadian businessman, climate activist and founder of Walk it Back, a global environmental campaign that raises awareness on international dialogue of carbon dioxide removal.

During his business career, Cohon advocated for the environment, investing in social and environment-driven businesses across the world. In 2000, he was named "A Global Leader for Tomorrow" by the World Economic Forum acknowledging his role in bringing Coca-Cola and Cirque du Soleil to Russia in the early 1990s. He is the son of George Cohon who brought McDonalds to Russia.

== Environmental activism ==
In 2021, Cohon became the first private citizen to undertake a personal lifetime carbon audit following COP26 and discovered he had caused 8,400 tons of carbon dioxide to be emitted into the atmosphere since his birth.

Furthermore, he donated USD $1 million of his pension to clean carbon removal projects and challenged himself to walk over 4,000 km across Europe to engage in a global discussion about carbon removal with those he would meet on the way.

From January 3 to June 5, 2023, Cohon planned to walk 25 to 35 km nearly every day, beginning in the United Kingdom and crossing 14 countries and 82 cities to reach his final destination. Cohon was accompanied by two trucks carrying his supplies. He completed his journey in Istanbul shortly before June 5, which marks both World Environment Day and his 60th birthday.

The campaign is called Walk it Back and works to support local clean city projects that aim to accelerate carbon removal efforts in energy, transport, industry, agriculture, oceans and buildings. In November 2022, Walk it Back published the policy paper "Getting to Net Negative", concerning the role that cities play in carbon removal.
