= Vkusno i Tochka =

Russian fast food chain

- Logo used since 2022

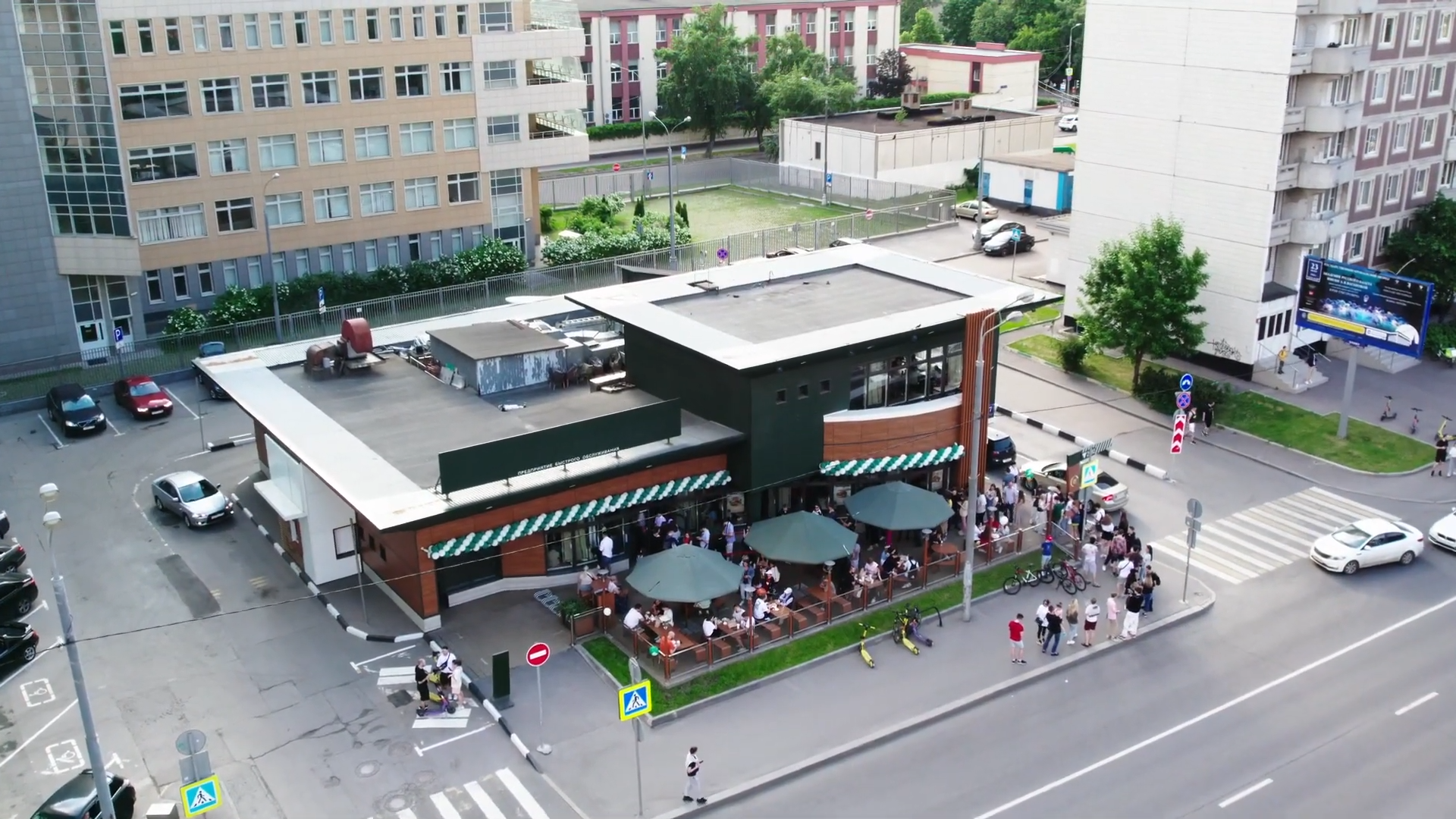
- A location in Moscow, Russia
- Native name: Вкусно — и точка
- Type: Private limited
- Industry: Restaurant
- Genre: Fast food
- Predecessor: McDonald's Russia (1990–2022)
- Founded: 31 January 1990; 36 years ago in Moscow, Soviet Union (as McDonald's); 12 June 2022; 4 years ago in Moscow (as Vkusno i tochka)
- Founder: Alexander Govor
- Headquarters: 26 Valovaya Street, Moscow, Russia
- Number of locations: 980+
- Area served: Russia; Belarus (as Mak.by); Kazakhstan (as I'm)
- Key people: Oleg Paroyev (CEO)
- Services: Master franchise
- Owner: PBO System LLC
- Subsidiaries: KSB Victory Restaurants (in Belarus); Food Solutions KZ (in Kazakhstan)
- Website: vkusnoitochka.ru

Vkusno i Tochka (Russian: Вкусно – и точка, IPA: [ˈfkusnə ɪ ˈtotɕkə], lit. 'Tasty, period') (Note: The website has long been known under the name Skoro tut budut burgery (Russian: Скоро тут будут бургеры, lit. 'Soon there will be burgers here').) is a Russian fast food chain based mostly in former McDonald's restaurants, with a menu that largely consists of rebranded McDonald's items. McDonald's closed their Russian stores in response to the 2022 Russian invasion of Ukraine; Vkusno i Tochka restaurants mostly occupy former McDonald's restaurants that were sold to business magnate and entrepreneur Alexander Govor, who was a company licensee in Siberia. The first restaurants in Russia were opened on 12 June 2022; since then, Vkusno i Tochka restaurants have also opened in Belarus and Kazakhstan, albeit under different names, also based mostly in former McDonald's restaurants in those two countries.

== History ==
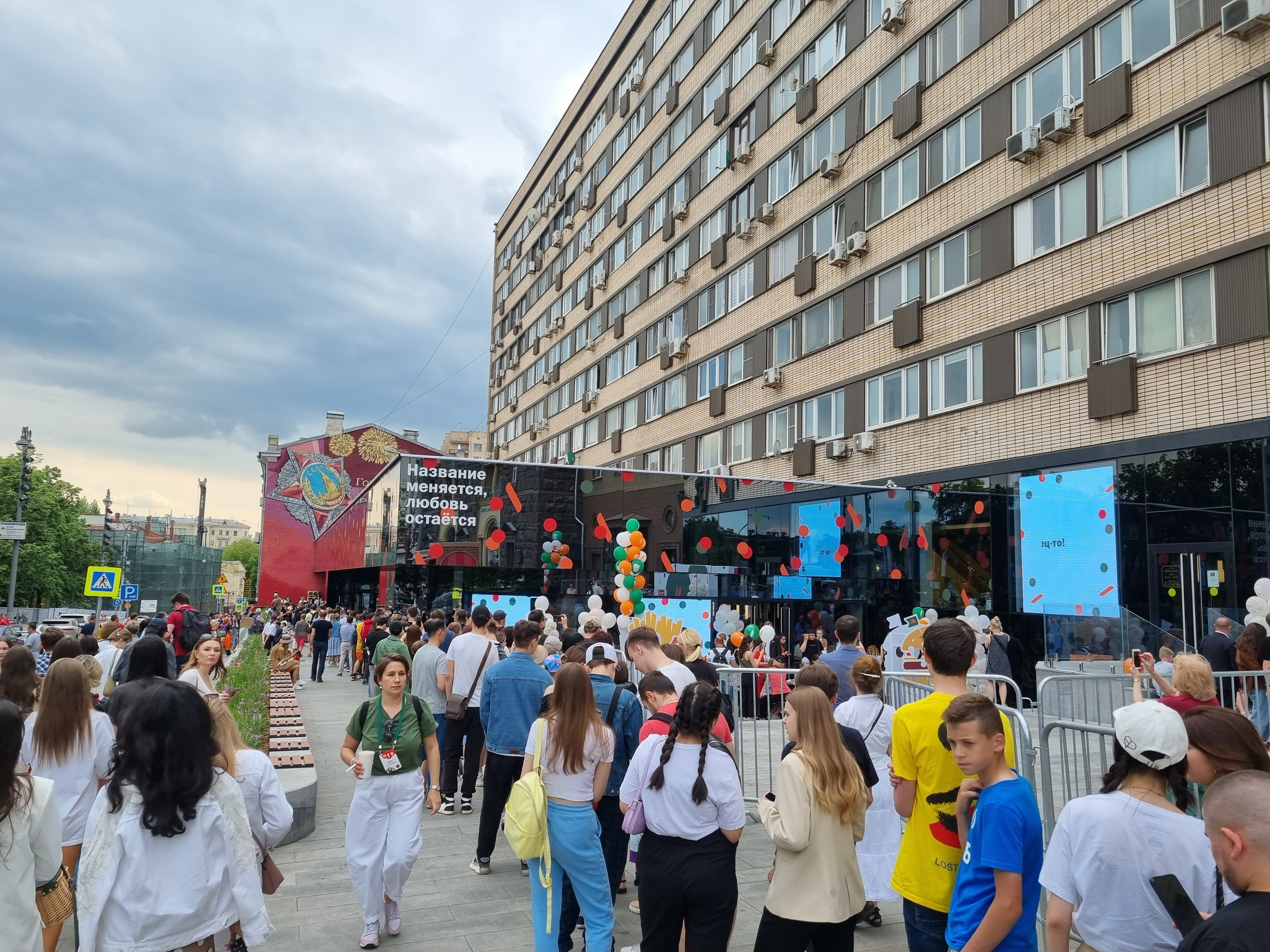
Opening of the first Vkusno i tochka restaurant in Pushkin Square, Moscow, 12 June 2022. Formerly the first Russian McDonald's in the country.

On 8 March 2022, facing continued pressure due to the Russian invasion of Ukraine, McDonald's announced the temporary suspension of operation of its restaurants in Russia, while also announcing at the same time that it would continue to pay its employees in the country. The restaurants were taken over by the CEO of McDonald's Russia, Oleg Paroyev, and remained open as of mid-March 2022.

On 16 May, the company decided to leave Russia altogether. On 27 May 2022, it was reported that McDonald's was selling its stores in Russia to a local licensee, Alexander Govor. Patent filings showed "Fun and Tasty" and "The Same One" as some of the possible brand names for the firm taking over McDonald's in Russia. Shortly after the announcement, the company replaced the McDonald's logo in favor of their own logo. The new name of the chain was later announced as Vkusno i tochka (Russian: Вкусно — и точка), translated as "Tasty, period". The legal entity remained the same but was renamed from McDonald's LLC to PBO System LLC, with Oleg Paroyev remaining as CEO.

On 12 June, the restaurant chain reopened 15 restaurants in Moscow. The next day, the restaurant chain reopened 50 more restaurants in Moscow and the wider Moscow region. McDonald's has a 15-year option to buy its former restaurants back from Vkusno i tochka.

On 8 July, RBK reported citing the company's press service that some restaurants would stop selling French fries and potato dishes due to a poor harvest the previous year, possibly until fall.

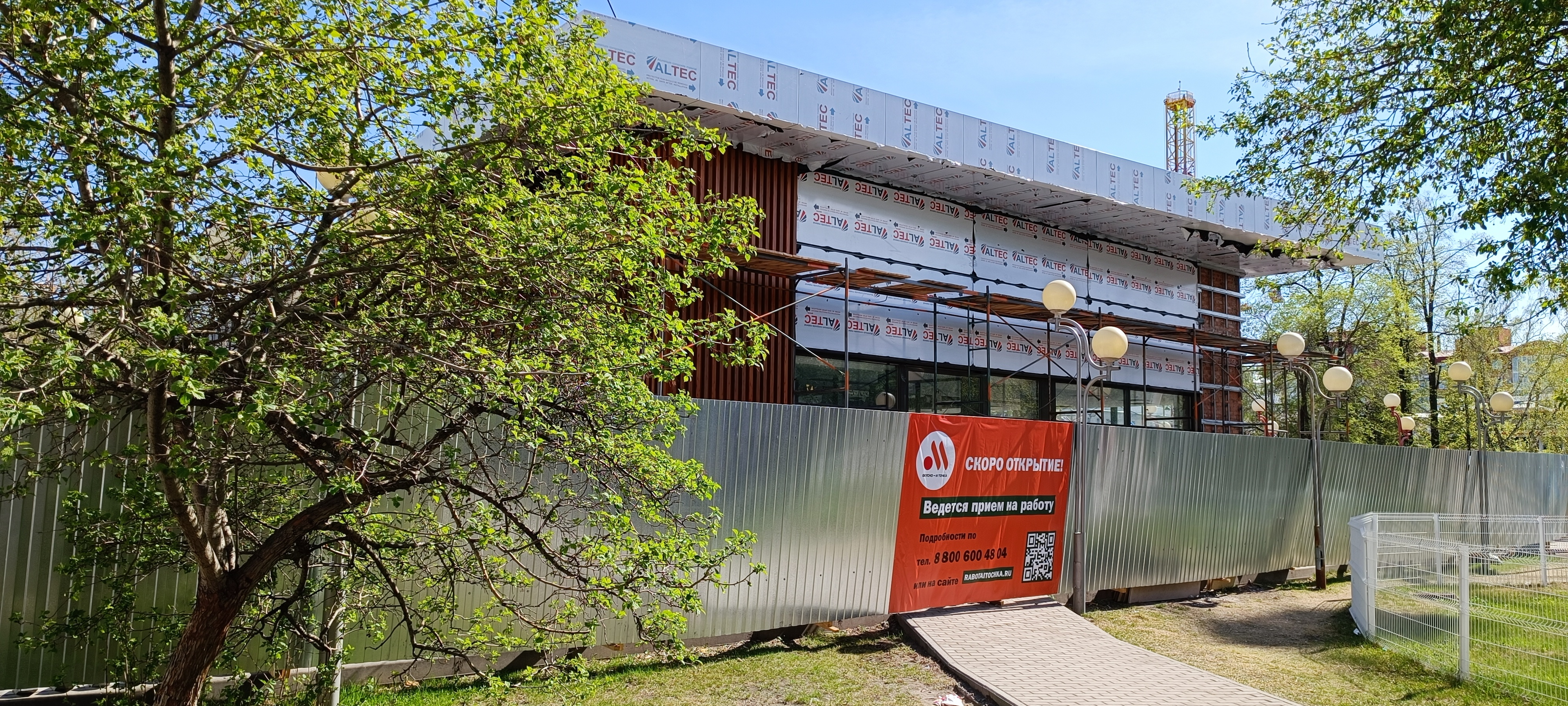
Construction of a new Vkusno i tochka restaurant in Tyumen, May 2023

Alexander Govor confirmed that Vkusno i tochka maintains regular contacts with McDonald's.

=== Expansion ===
==== Belarus ====
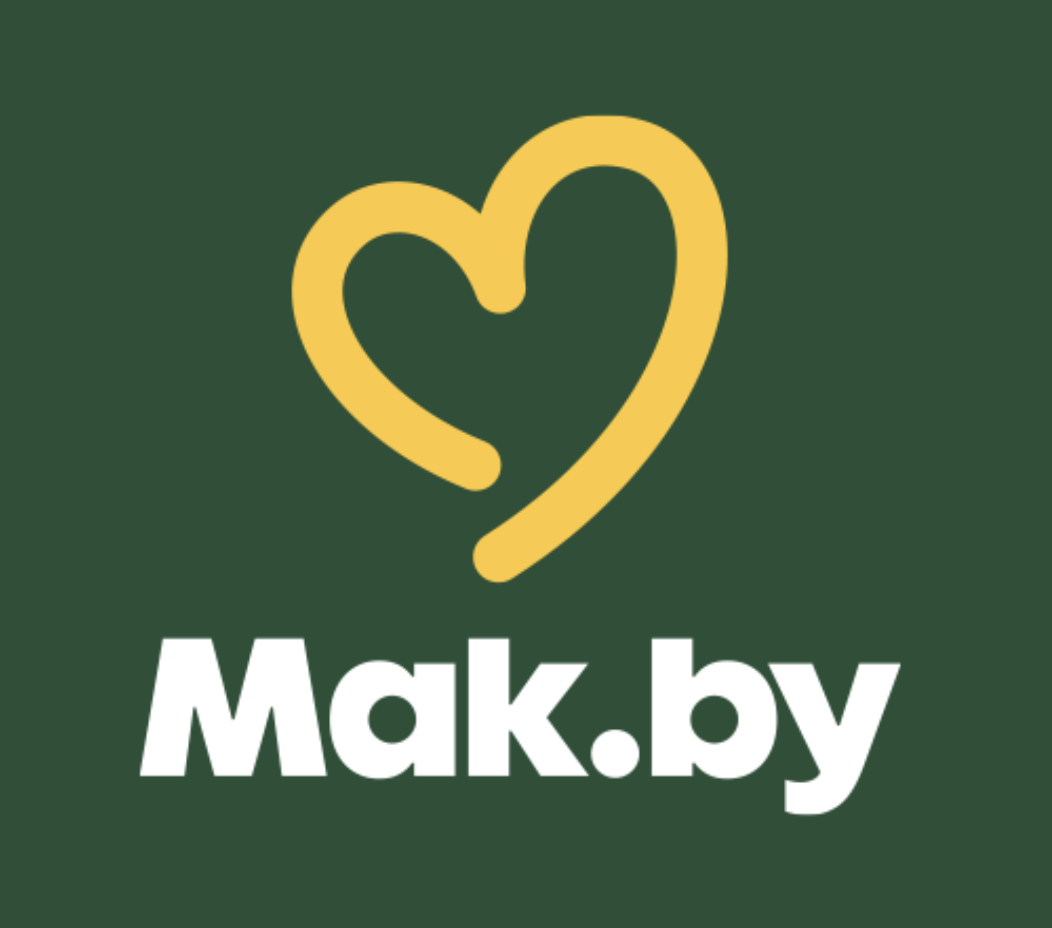
Mak.by

In November 2022, it was announced that McDonald's was leaving Belarus on 22 November and that the Russian fast food chain Vkusno i tochka would take its place. However, this did not happen, and the operations of McDonald's was extended until 27 November; since then, the restaurants operated under the sign "We are open!" (Russian: Мы открыты!, IPA: [ˌmɨ ɐtˈkrɨtɨ]).

In early April 2023, KSB Victory Restaurants (Russian: КСБ Виктори Рестораны, IPA: [ˌkaɛzˈbɛ vʲɪkˈtorʲɪ rʲɪstɐˈranɨ]), operators of McDonald's in the country, filed an application for registration of the name and trademark "Mak.by". On April 18, 2023, the restaurant chain was renamed Mak.by.

==== China ====
In September 2023, the restaurant was seeking permission from McDonald's to open the first Chinese branch in Heihe.

==== Kazakhstan ====
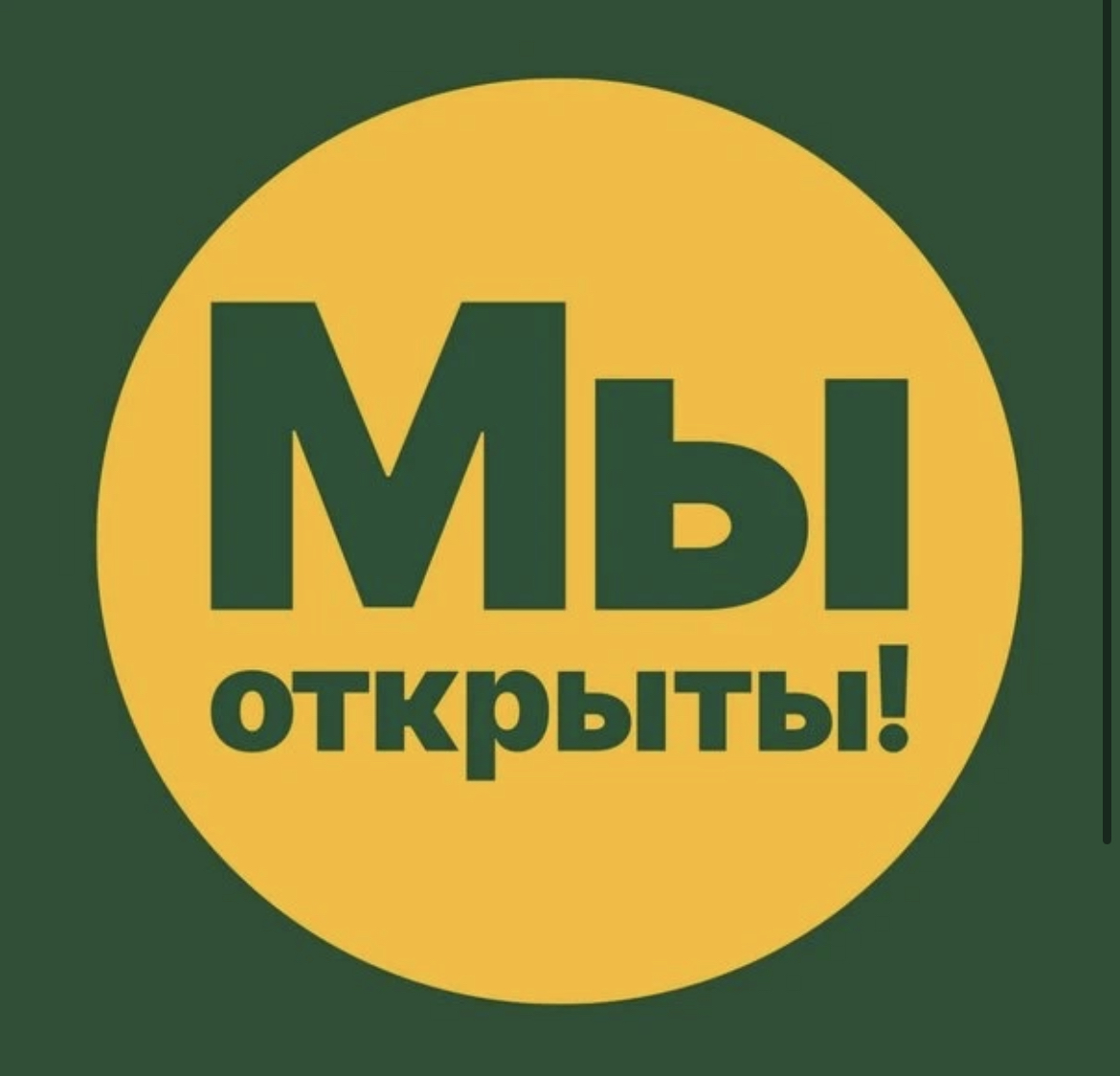
My otkryty (2023)

On 5 January 2023, McDonald's closed its restaurants in Kazakhstan, believed to be due to supply issues after McDonald's prohibited the franchise owner from purchasing burger patties from Russia due to the Russo-Ukrainian war, with its restaurants, operated by Food Solutions KZ, later rebranded to My otkryty. Since August, the network had operated under different names, based on the names of company employees. On November 23, they were rebranded to I'm.

Vkusno i tochka will not operate under its brand in Kazakhstan due to the terms of the contract with McDonald's. However, Vkusno i tochka applied to register its brand name.

== Menu ==
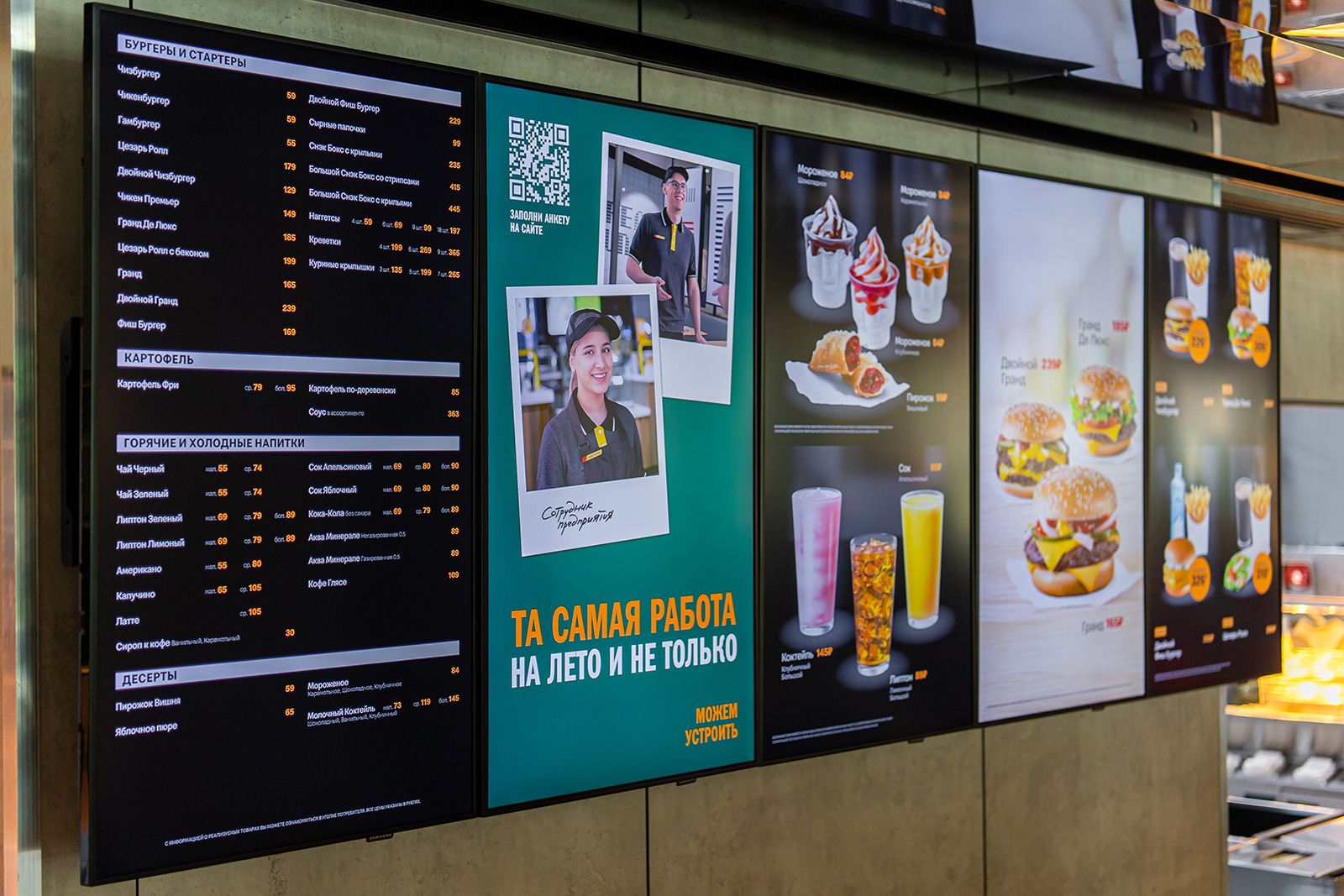
Menu in a Vkusno i tochka restaurant in Moscow

At the initial stage of opening, the restaurants did not offer every menu item they had originally planned due to supply chain issues and packaging logistics. According to quality manager Alexander Merkulov, the dishes contain the same ingredients and are prepared with the same equipment used when McDonald's operated the restaurants, but are served in different packaging.

In 2022, Vkusno i tochka started selling shrimp in all of its restaurants (with some locations having previously sold shrimp before the conversion).

Due to some restrictions, Vkusno i tochka did not serve its equivalent to the Big Mac (The Big Hit) until February 2023, after the sauce and composition were modified to avoid infringing on McDonald's trademarks. Due to The Coca-Cola Company's departure from Russia, supplies for Coca-Cola were running low as of June 2022. In September, Vkusno i tochka replaced Coca-Cola brand drinks with analogous drinks of the brand Dobry (which is also produced by the Russian subsidiary of Coca-Cola HBC).

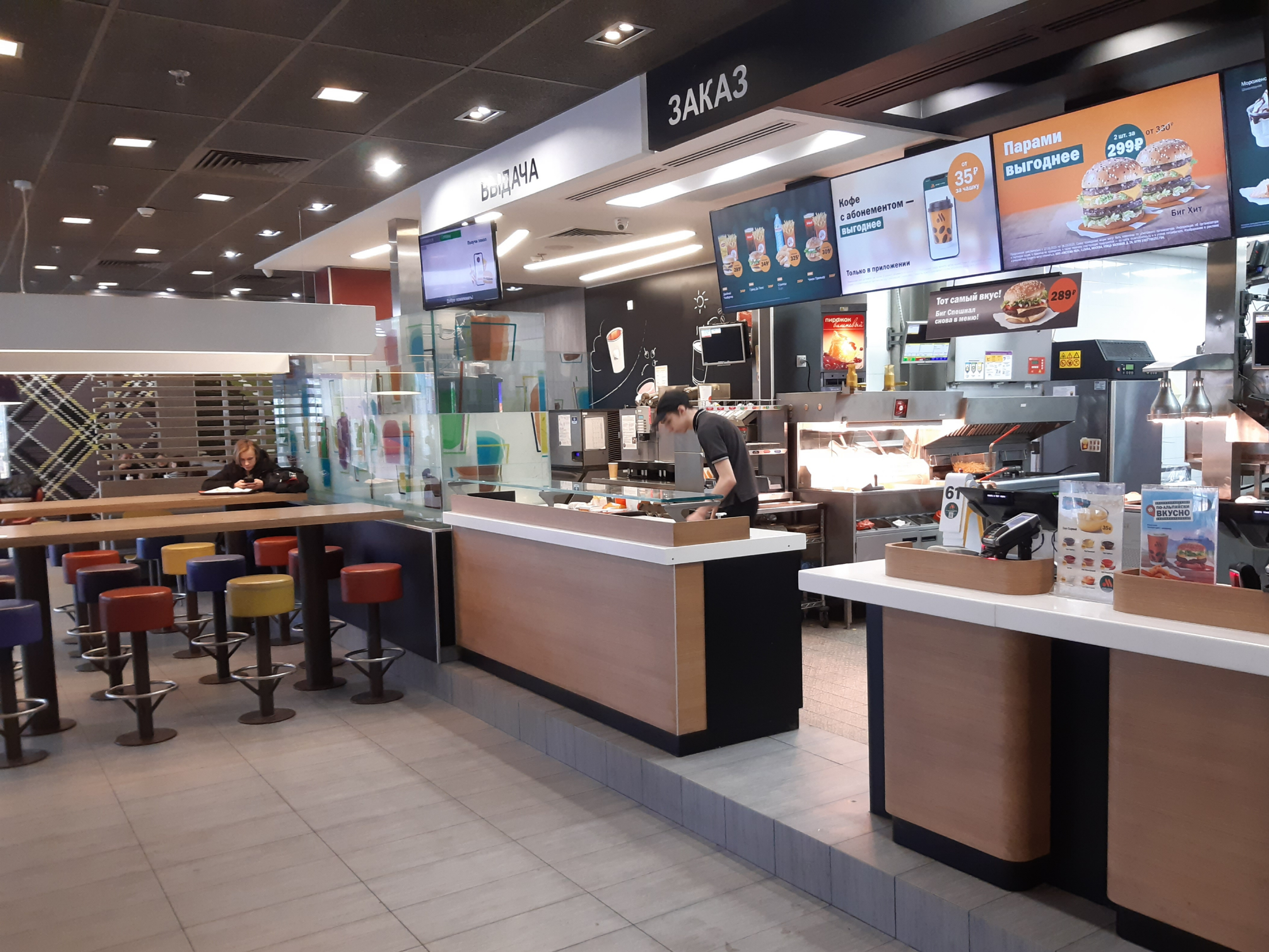
Front counter in a Vkusno i tochka restaurant in Novosibirsk. The Big Hit can be seen on one of the television screens above.

As of June 2025, the chain serves the following items (the McDonald's items they replace are in parentheses):

- Hamburger, Cheeseburger, Double Cheeseburger, Triple Cheeseburger
- Big Hit (Big Mac) and Double Big Hit
- Grand Burger (Quarter Pounder with Cheese / McRoyal), Double Grand Burger, Grand Deluxe Burger (Quarter Pounder with Cheese Deluxe), Grand Deluxe jalapeño
- Big Special (Big Tasty), Double Big Special, Big Special Junior, Big Special with Mushrooms and Big Chicken Burger (Big Tasty Chicken)
- Fishburger (Filet-O-Fish) and Double Fishburger
- Chickenburger (Junior Chicken), Chicken Hit (McChicken), Chicken Hit, Chicken Premier (Seriously Chicken) and Chicken Premier with Mushrooms
- Caesar Roll (McWrap), Big Special Roll, Shrimp Roll, Fresh Roll and Chicken Fresh Roll
- French Fries / Grand Fries, Potato wedges and Potato slices
- Chicken nuggets, chicken strips, Fish Sticks, shrimp, apple slices and carrot sticks
- Vegetable salad, Caesar salad and Caesar salad with shrimp
- Dobry Cola (Coca-Cola), Dobry Cola Zero Sugar (Coca-Cola Zero Sugar), Dobry Orange (Fanta), Dobry Lemon-Lime (Sprite), Lipton Ice Tea Lemon, Lipton Ice Tea Green, Lemonade Strawberry-Cactus, Sunrise Strawberry-Cactus, milkshake, sundae, Ice Deluxe (McFlurry), tea, coffee and juice
- Kids Combo (Happy Meal)
- Breakfast pancakes, omelet, cherry pie and mango-passion fruit pie
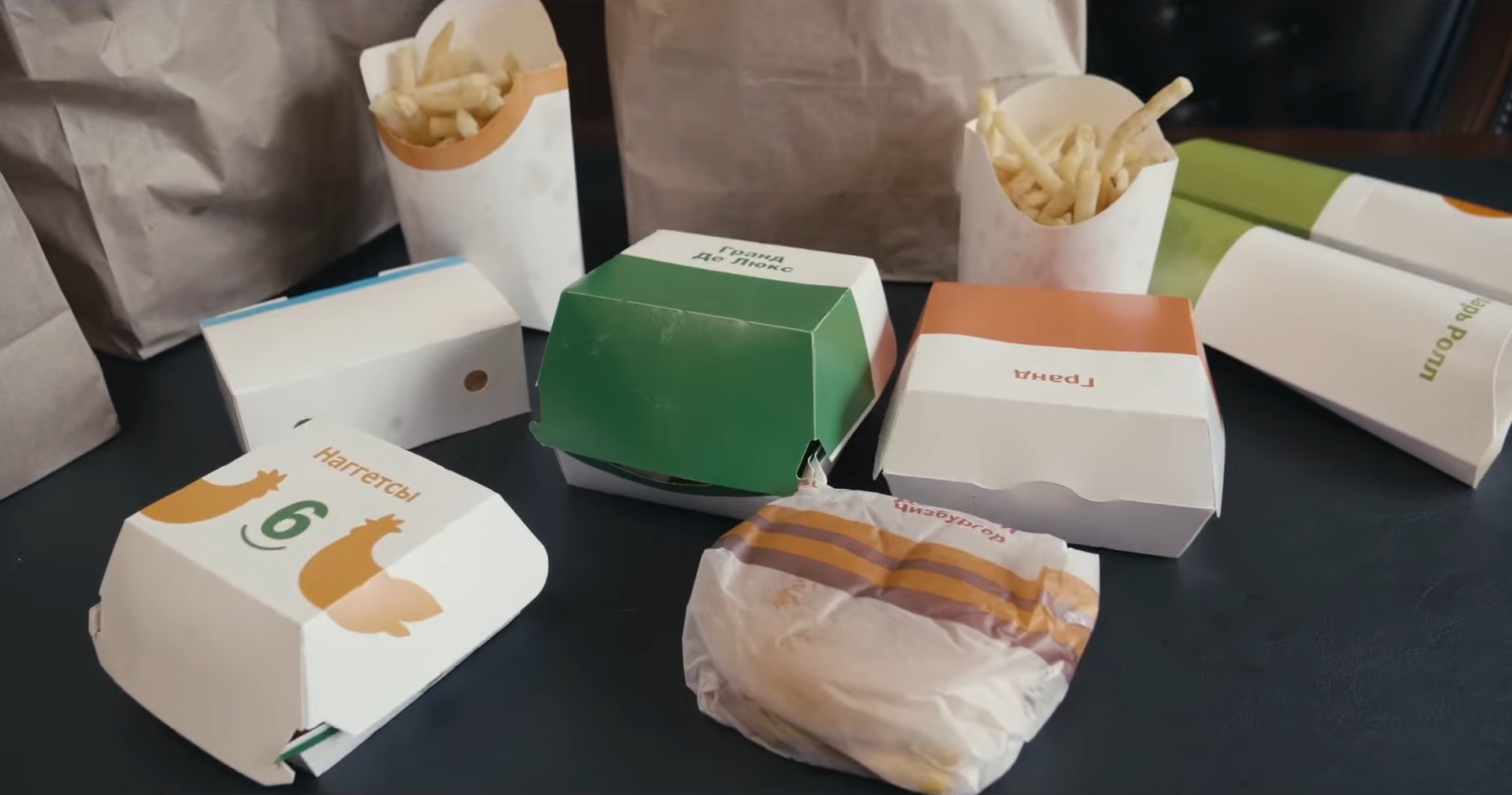
Food in packages

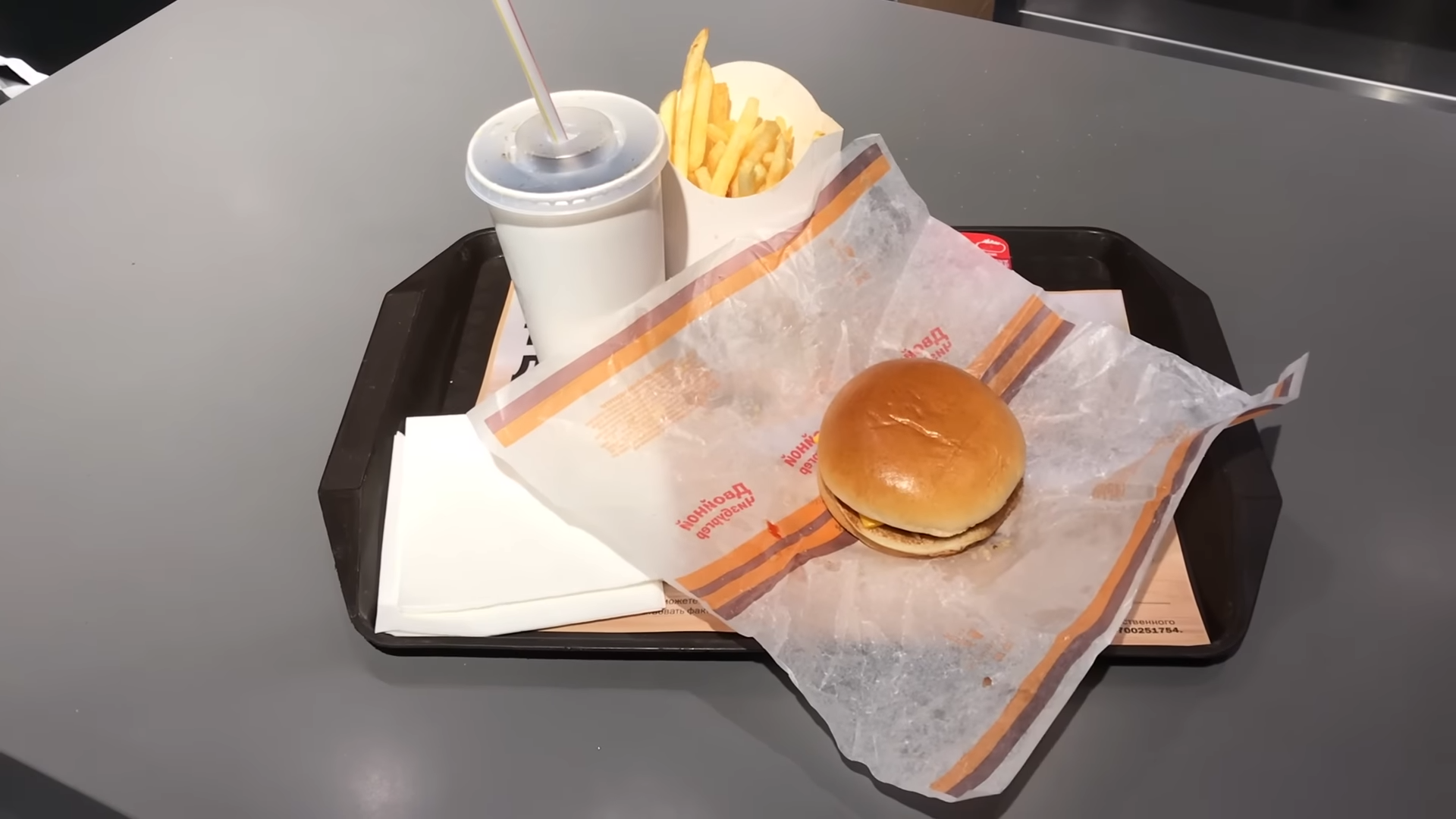
Double cheeseburger, fries, and drink

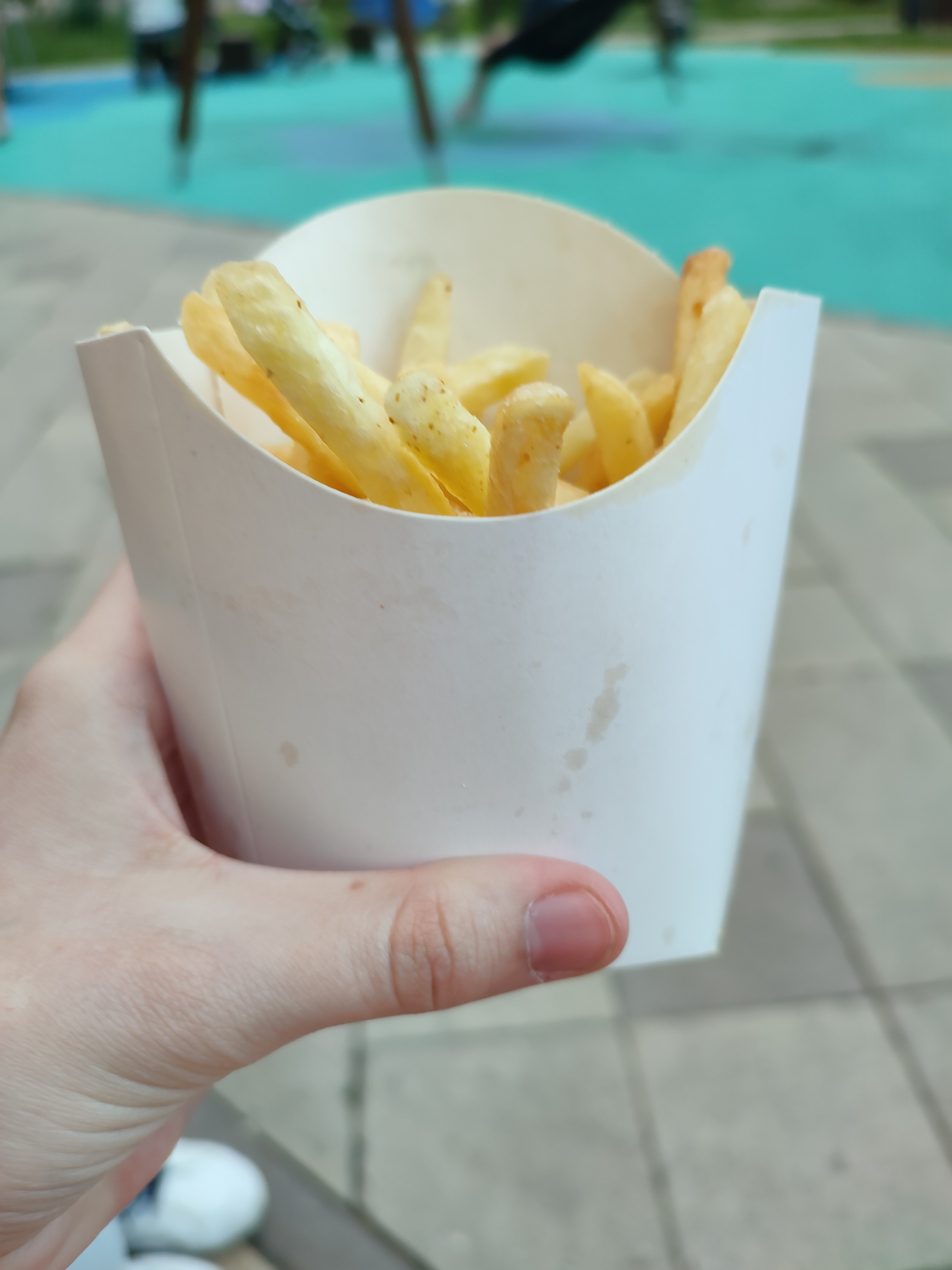
French fries

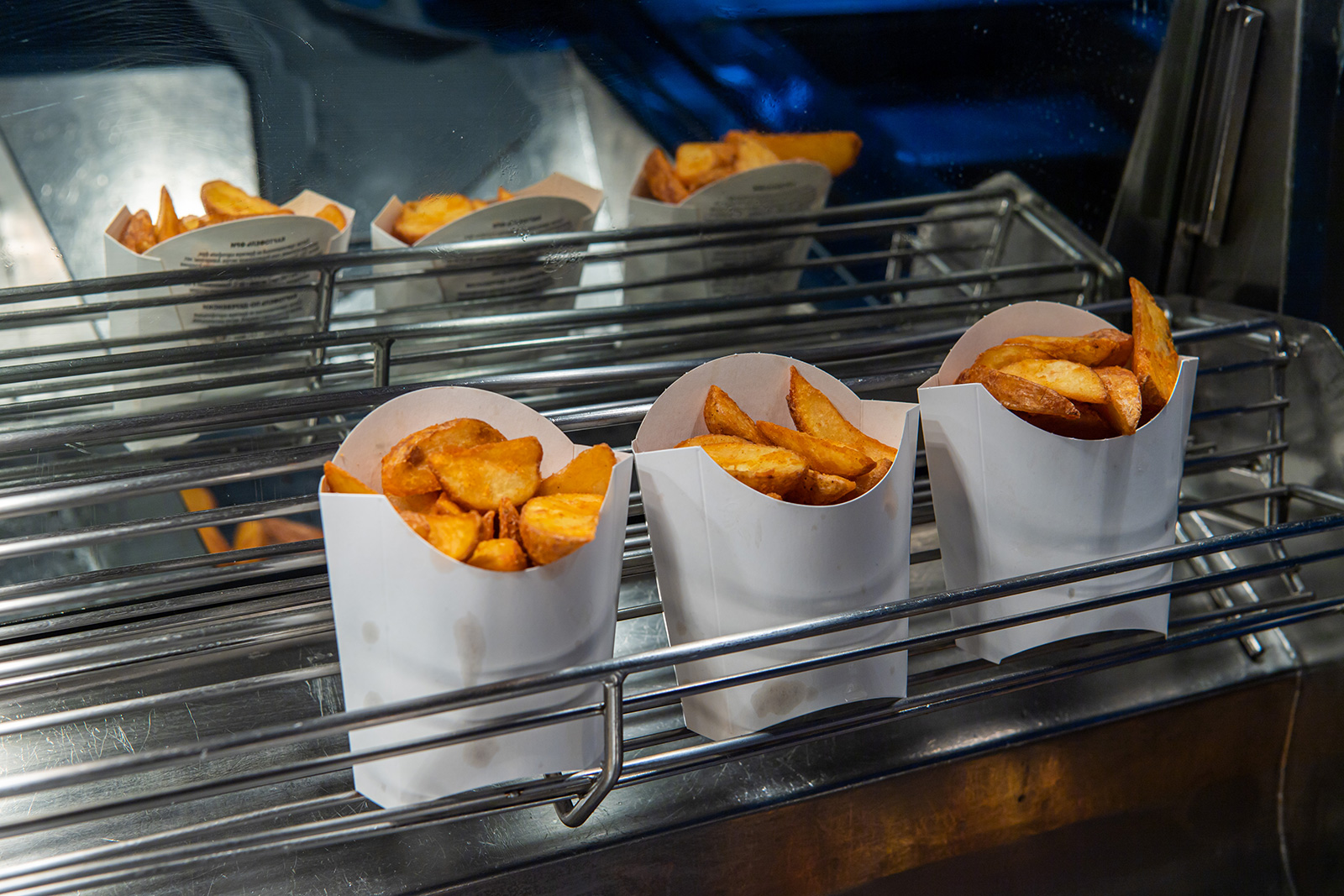
Potato wedges

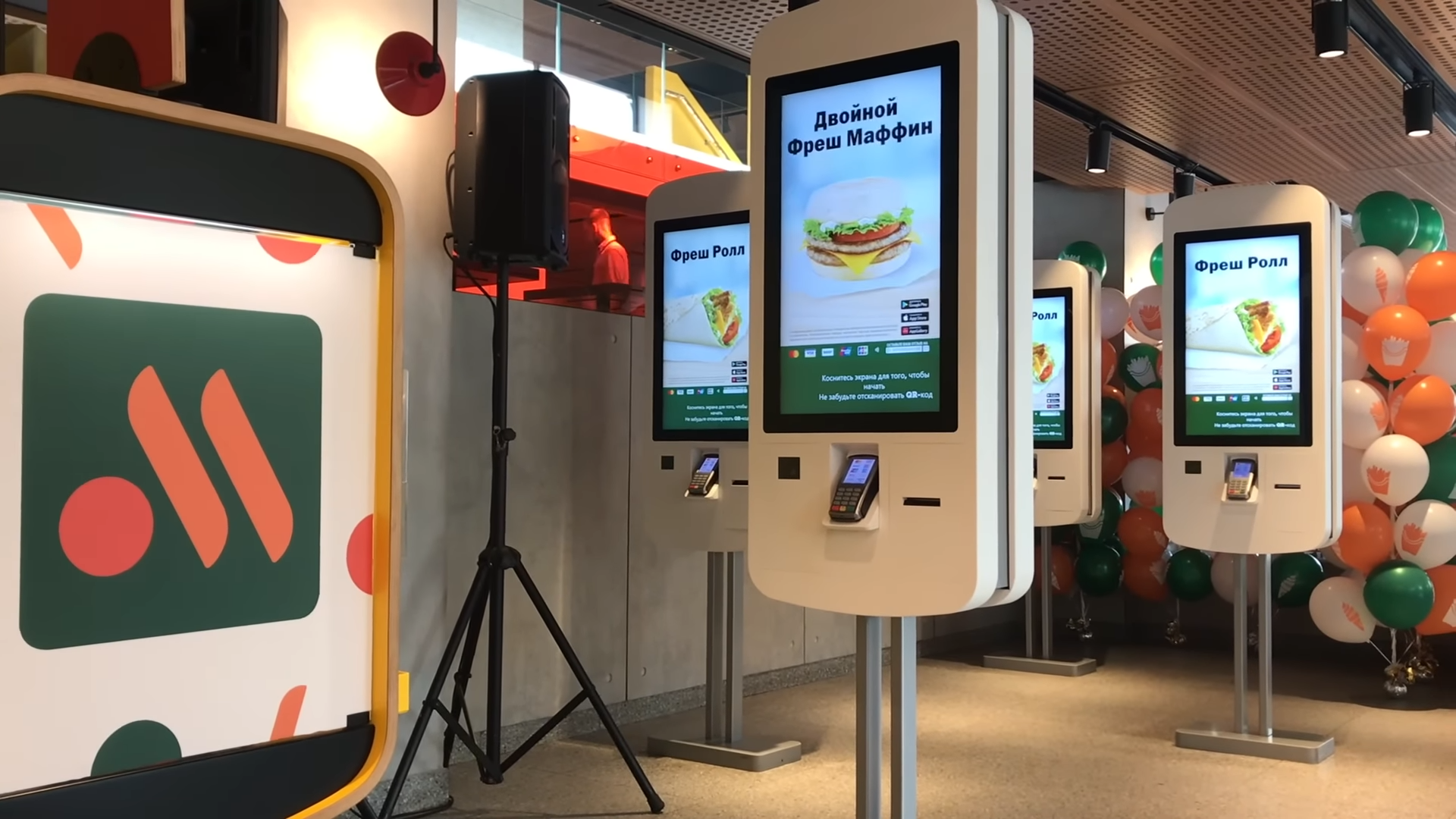
Interactive kiosks

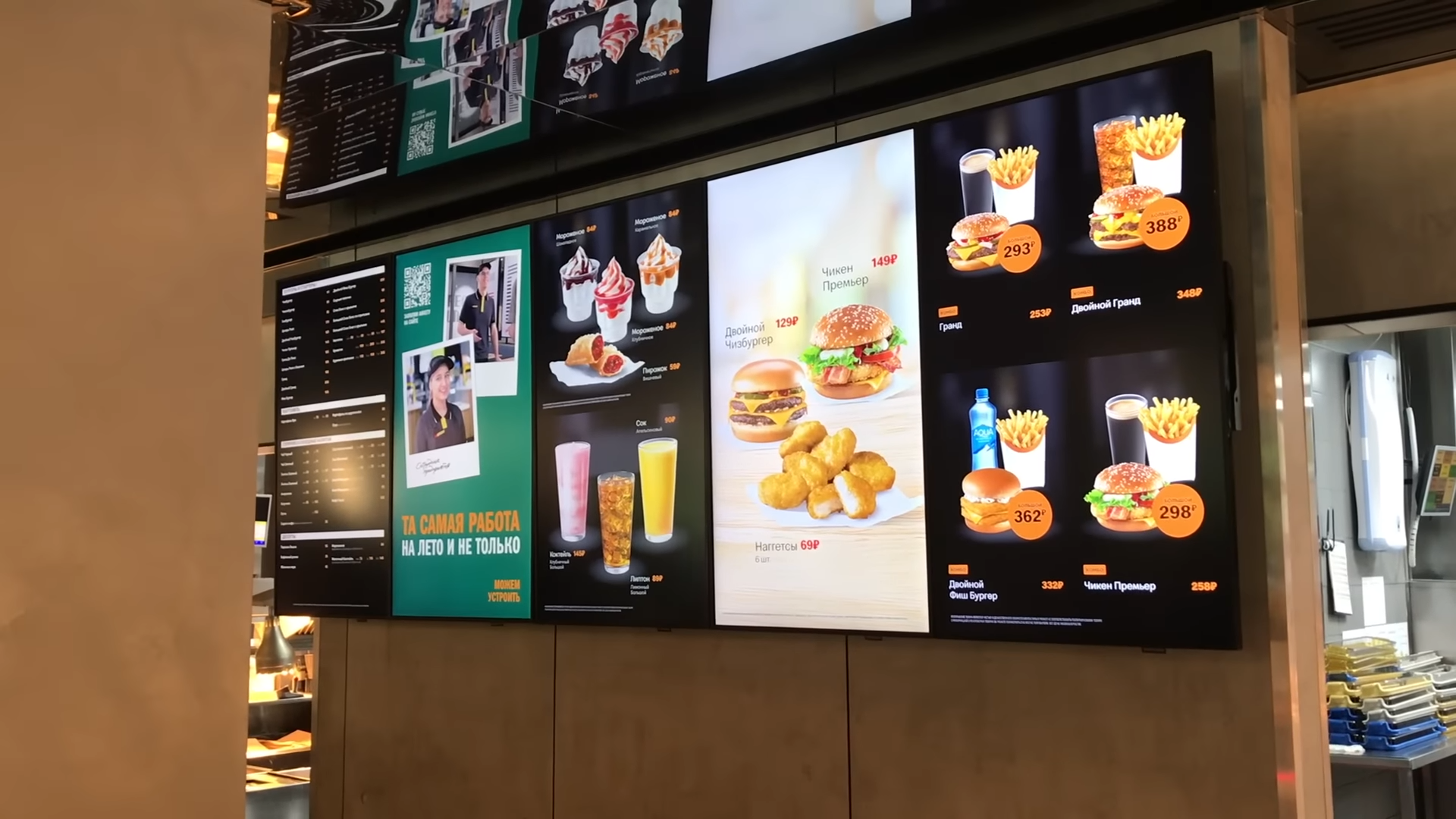
Аnimated menu

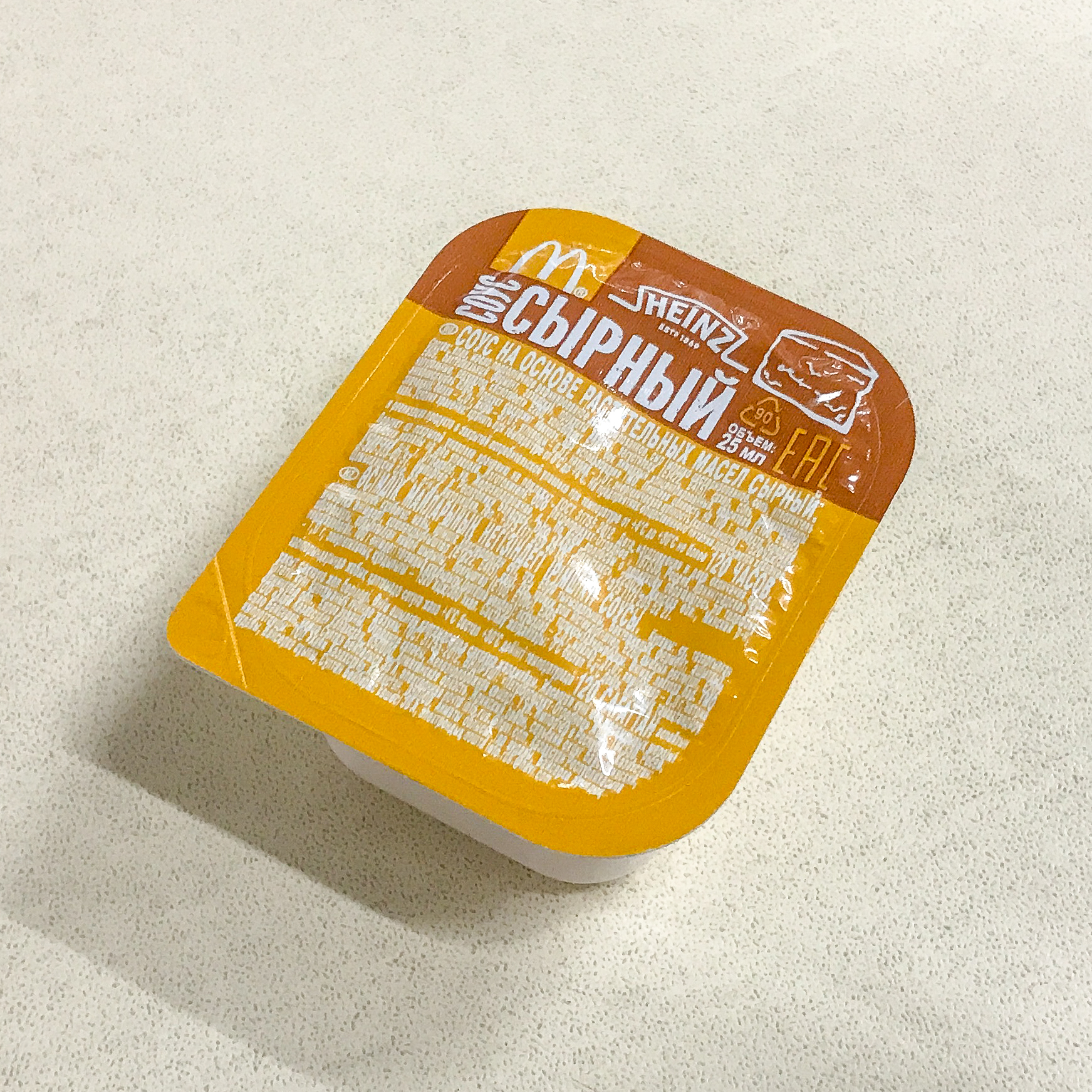
Sauce packets (2022–2023); Initially, Vkusno i tochka sold the remaining stock of McDonald's Sauce packets and some locations would also scribble out the m from the packets with a marker.

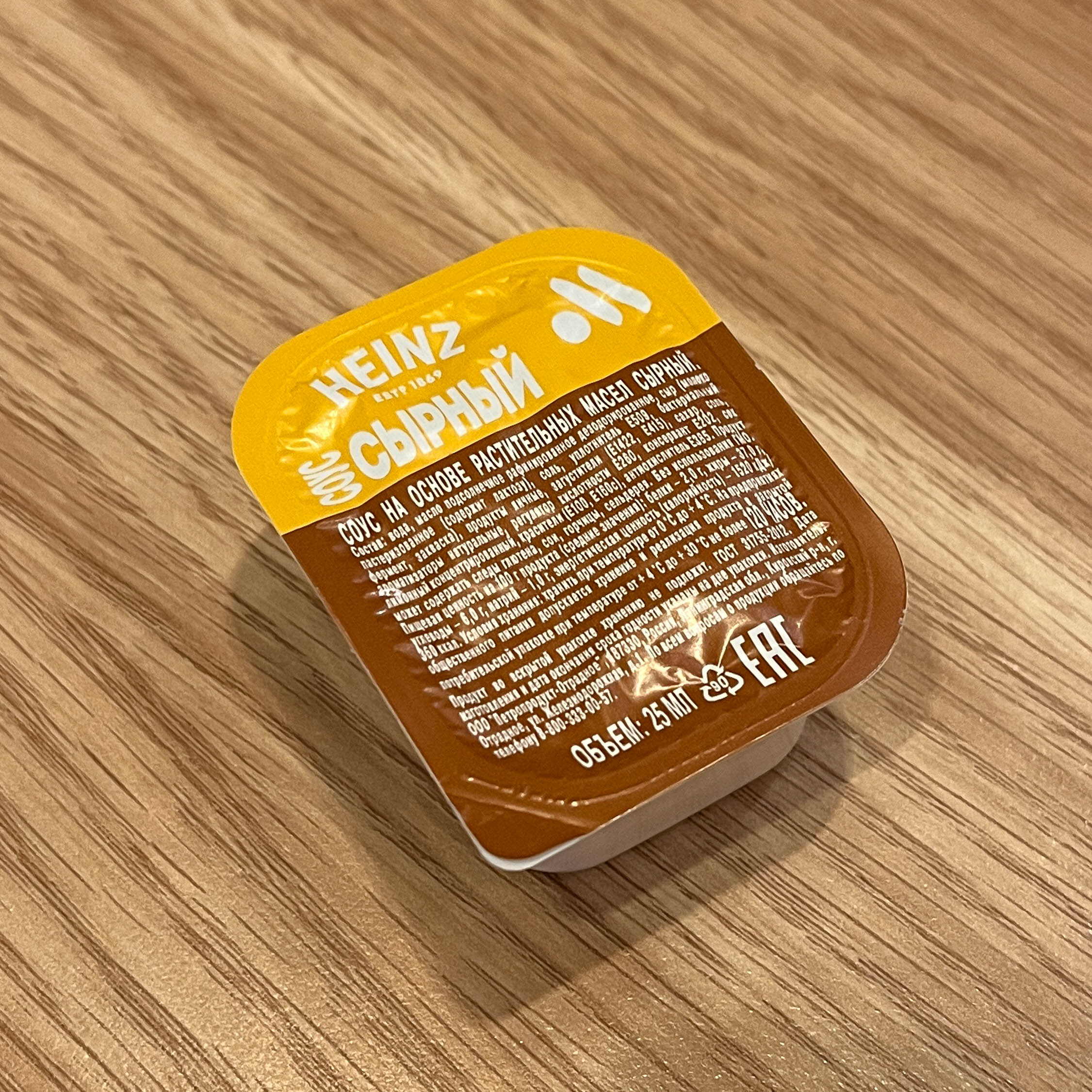
Sauce packets (2023 onwards); as of 2023, the Sauce packets now come with the Vkusno i tochka logo.

== Marketing ==
=== Promotions ===
Vkusno i tochka has repeatedly held collaborations featuring Om Nom from the Cut the Rope game franchise, with promotional items included with in the kids menu in January 2025, December 2025 and January 2026.

In July 2025, a Hello Kitty themed menu was released by the restaurant. The centrepiece of the campaign was a pink coloured burger and sauce, as well as themed packaging.

For the 65th anniversary of Yuri Gagarin's flight, the first human orbital spaceflight in history, special collectibles were included with the Kids Combo included nine spacecraft models of Vostok, Soyuz-2, Buran, Angara-A5, Arktika-M, Lunokhod-1, Marfa Robot, cosmonauts, and 'Tastemen'. Each set would include historical information relating to it, as well as a link to an asteroids style mobile game. The promotion was launched on 7 April 2026, ready for Cosmonautics Day.

In August 2026, Vkusno i tochka partnered with miHoYo, creators of the action role-playing video game Genshin Impact. Branding and characters from the game were placed across food packaging, promotional materials and collectible merchandise. Customers would purchase special meal options named Super Boxes, which included a physical collectible as well as an activation code which would be activated within the Vkusno i tochka app. The promotion ran from 17 August to 13 September 2026.

In September 2026, a collaboration with banking and financial services company Sberbank was announced, with marketing based on the companies "SberKot" mascot for the promotion of the companies SberPrime subscription services.

== Controversies and criticisms ==
=== Logo and name ===
Since the opening of the restaurant chain, many users of the social networks VKontakte and Twitter did not like the name "Tasty, period"; however, other users reported that the variant of the name "Uncle Vanya" was not so bad. Critics of the new logo have noted its similarity to the logo of Marriott International, which also operates in Russia. For example, some said that the logo looks like "the logo of the Marriott hotel combined with the Flag of Bangladesh." On the opening day, a protester held up a banner: "Bring back Big Mac!". He was quickly removed from the scene.

According to Nikolai Grigoriev, member of the Board of the Guild of Marketeers, the name of the fast food chain will not take root among consumers, he believes that the network may soon be renamed due to inconvenience of the name:

It's a long name. Imagine a young man telling another: "Let's go to a 'Tasty, period'". Here the simplest analogy is Sber. They just shortened it, or, to say more precisely, officially instated it.

External image
- Сравнение логотипов «Вкусно — и точка» и «Matosmix» (comparing the logos of «Vkusno — i tochka» and «Matosmix»; archived on 17 June 2022)

According to the marketeer, the old name "McDonald's" will soon disappear from the lexicon of the Russian consumers, and, to not pronounce the long phrase, clients of the chain will make up their own. On 13 June, various messages appeared claiming that the logo of Vkusno i tochka is a lazy alteration of a Portuguese pet food brand "Matosmix".

On 15 June, the director of a fast food chain known as "Food, full stop" (Russian: Еда и точка) in Primorsky Krai, Sergei Ponkratov, accused the new chain of plagiarism and decided to sue it, demanding a change of the name. He claims that the Vkusno i tochka brand clearly intersects with and deprives his trademark, which has been operating since 2018, of uniqueness and recognizability.

=== Problems with food ===
In July 2022, some restaurants of the chain said they would temporarily stop serving fries due to a shortage of the correct potato variety.

== See also ==
- McDonald's Russia
- Metro, a similar chain of McDonald's replacements in Iceland
- Hungry Jack's, the localized version of Burger King in Australia
