= George Cohon =

American-Canadian businessman (1937–2023)

George Cohon CC OOnt
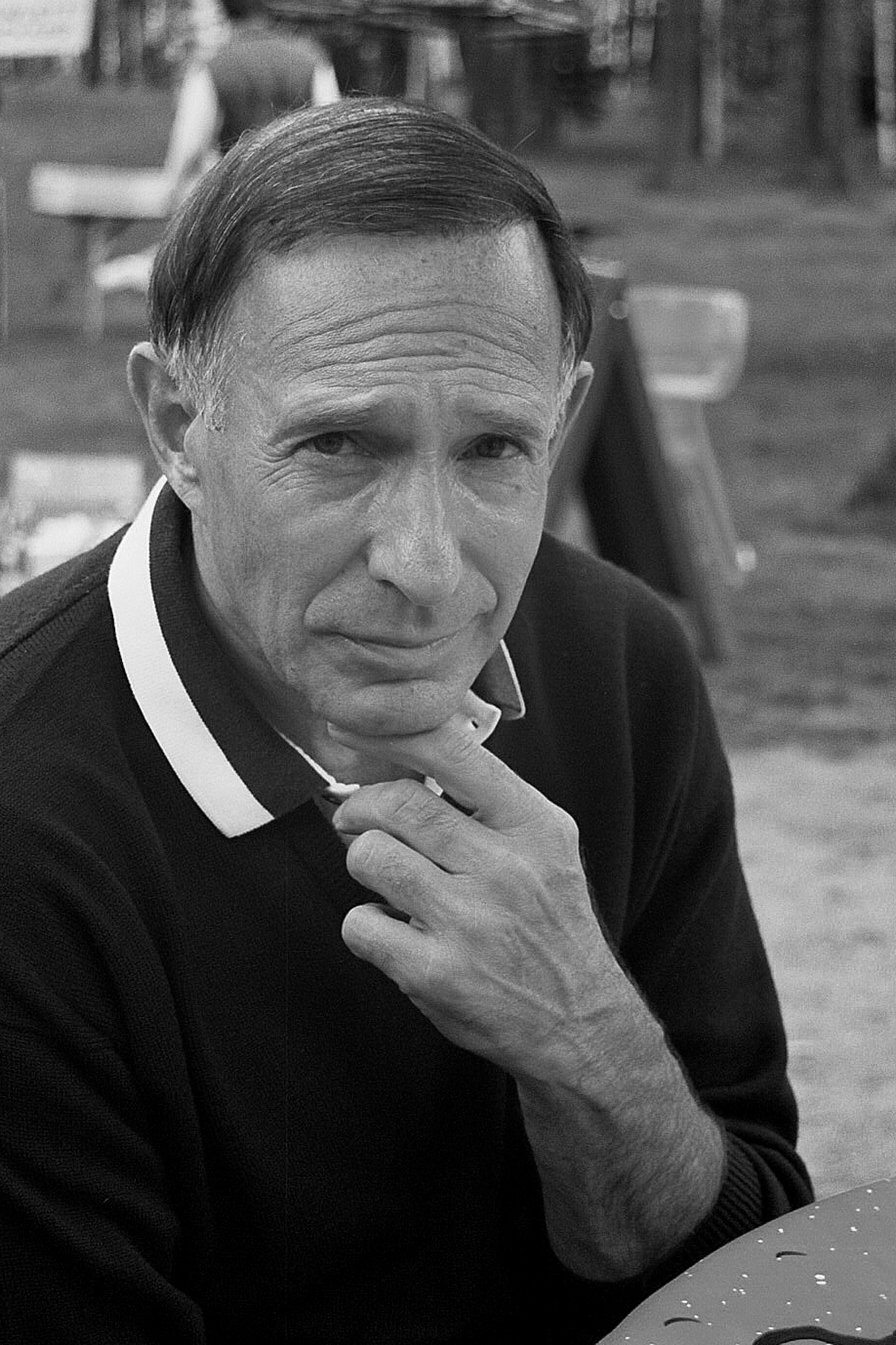
- Born: George Alan Cohon; April 19, 1937; Chicago, Illinois, U.S.
- Died: November 24, 2023 (aged 86); Toronto, Ontario, Canada
- Occupations: Businessman; lawyer
- Known for: Founder and senior chairman of McDonald's Canada and McDonald's Russia
- Relatives: Mark Cohon (son); Craig Cohon (son)
- Awards: Order of Canada; Order of Ontario

George Alan Cohon CC OOnt (April 19, 1937 – November 24, 2023) was an American-born Canadian businessman and lawyer, who was the founder and senior chairman of McDonald's Canada and McDonald's Russia.

== Early life and education ==
George Alan Cohon was born in Chicago, Illinois, the son of Carolyn (Ellis) and Jack Cohon, who worked as a lawyer and later a baker. His father was Ukrainian Jewish and his mother American Jewish. He grew up in Chicago sharing a bedroom with his older sister, Sandy.

Cohon received a B.Sc. from Drake University and a Juris Doctor degree from the Northwestern University School of Law.

While at Northwestern, he met his future wife Susan.

== Career ==
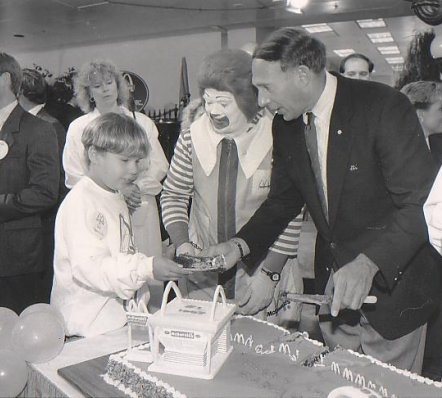
Cohon at the opening of the 600th McDonald's Canada restaurant at the SkyDome, 1989

Cohon practiced corporate law in Chicago from 1961 to 1967 at his father's law firm, before moving to Toronto, Ontario as the licensee of McDonald's Corporation for Eastern Canada. He opened his first McDonald's location in London, Ontario on November 11, 1968. On the day of the opening, McDonald's founder Ray Kroc offered to buy Cohon's licence for $1 million. Cohon later became chairman, president and chief executive officer of McDonald's Restaurants of Canada. By 1976, Cohon presided over 200 McDonald's locations. In 1982, Cohon and 20 corporate sponsors helped save the Toronto Santa Claus Parade, which was sponsored by Eaton's department stores from 1905 to 1981. He grew his McDonald's franchise by himself until 1971, when McDonald's bought him out with stock. Cohon eventually became a Canadian citizen in 1975.

In 1988, Cohon was appointed to sit on the board of the Royal Bank of Canada and Director of the Board of Astral Inc and Toronto Sun Publishing Corporation.

Cohon was involved in opening McDonald's in the former Soviet Union with the first restaurant opening in Moscow on January 31, 1990. He was subsequently named Russia's "Capitalist Hero of Labor." The first restaurant was at the time McDonald's biggest, and was opened with minimal involvement from the U.S. parent company, for political reasons. It accepted only Russian rubles, not hard currency, and in the early days, the line to enter the restaurant could be several hours long. Due to Soviet supply shortages, the company created its own supply chain in the Soviet Union, including farms and packaging. At the 1991 G7 Summit in London, Canadian prime minister Brian Mulroney (Cohon's personal friend) personally complained to Mikhail Gorbachev about the difficulties Cohon was experiencing doing business in the Soviet Union.

Cohon was also the founder of Ronald McDonald House Charities, which provides accommodation for families whose children are receiving medical treatment, in Canada and in Russia.

== Personal life and death ==
His son, Mark Cohon, was the 12th commissioner of the Canadian Football League. His other son, businessman Craig Cohon, helped bring Coca-Cola to Russia.

In 2000, George Cohon was diagnosed with prostate cancer, but fully recovered. In 2004, he was rejected from Toronto's Rosedale Golf Club due to his Jewish heritage. After being taken to court, a Judge ruled this was unlawful. Cohon died in Toronto on November 24, 2023, at the age of 86.

== Awards and honours ==
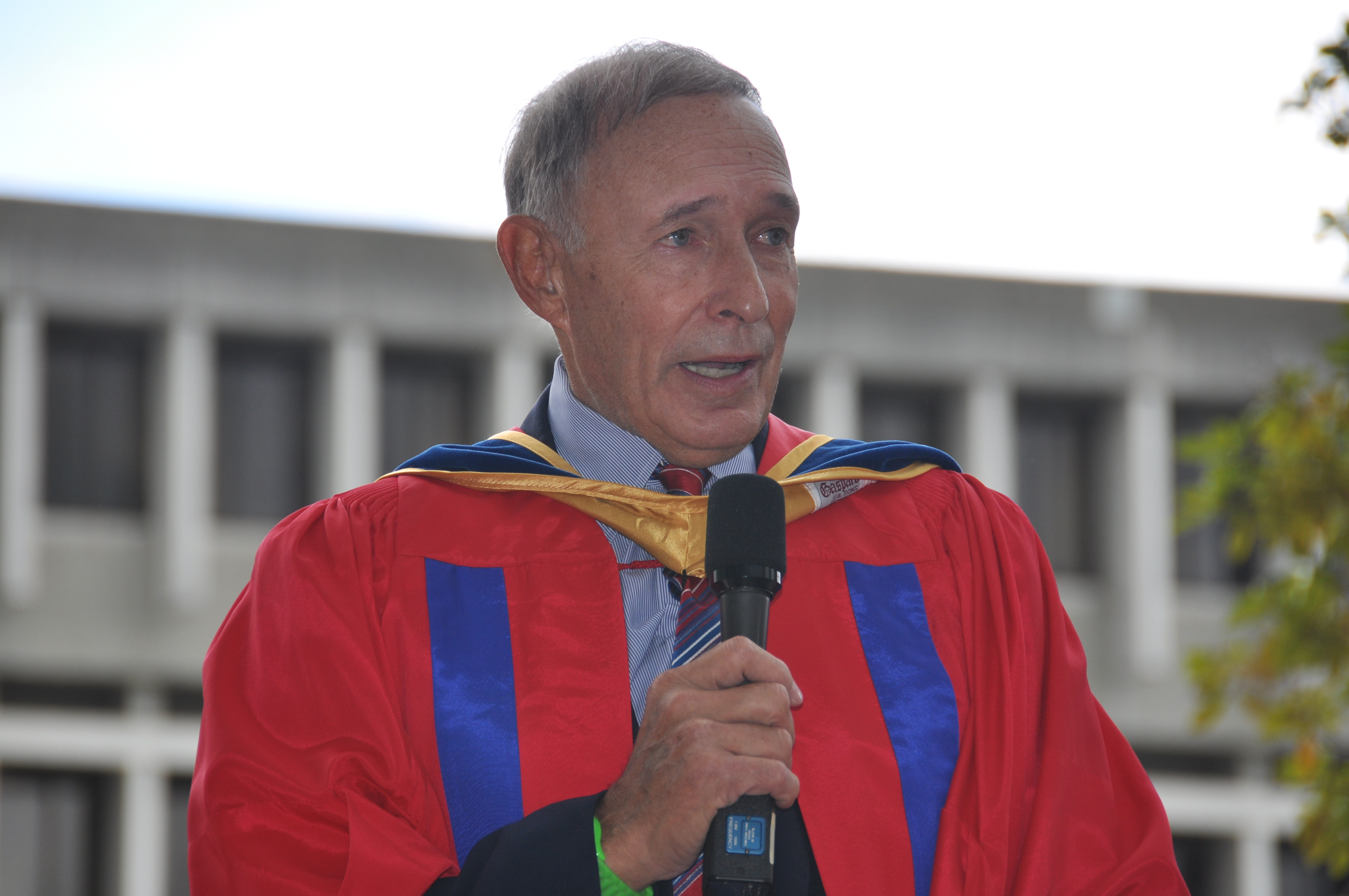
Cohon at Simon Fraser University in 2011

In 1988, he was made a Member of the Order of Canada. In 1998, he was awarded the Order of Friendship by the Russian government.

Cohon was awarded the Order of Ontario in 2000. In 2012, he received a key to the city of Toronto.

In 2019, he was promoted within the Order of Canada to the highest grade of Companion by Governor General Julie Payette. This gave him the Post Nominal Letters "CC" for Life.

On June 14, 2011, he was awarded the honorary degree of Doctor of Laws (LL.D) by Simon Fraser University.

As a recipient of the Order of Canada, he also received the 125th Anniversary of the Confederation of Canada Medal in 1992, the Canadian Version of the Queen Elizabeth II Golden Jubilee Medal in 2002 and the Canadian Version of the Queen Elizabeth II Diamond Jubilee Medal in 2012.
