= Tom Wright (sports executive) =

Canadian sports executive

- Born: 1953 (age 72–73); Toronto, Ontario, Canada
- Occupation: Businessman
- Known for: UFC Canada; CFL Commissioner

Thomas E. S. Wright (born 1953) is the 11th commissioner of the Canadian Football League (CFL), appointed to the position on November 2, 2002. He was the UFCs Director of Operations for Canada, Australia and New Zealand until October 19, 2016, when he announced he was no longer with the organisation. Prior to his role with the CFL and UFC, Wright was the president of Adidas Canada and president and CEO of Salomon Group North America. He is involved in several charitable organizations, and is the chairman of Special Olympics Canada.

Wright attended Upper Canada College, the University of Toronto and York University earning a Bachelor of Physical Education and a Master of Business Administration. His wife Ginnie Grand Wright's family were the founders and former owners of office supply chain Grand & Toy. He was born in Toronto, Ontario.

Wright's tenure with the CFL was largely successful, however, several members of the board were said to be dissatisfied and wanted him replaced. It was announced on July 5, 2006, that Wright had informed the CFL that he would not be seeking a contract extension as league commissioner, thus ending his tenure as the 11th CFL commissioner. On March 28, 2007, Mark Cohon was officially announced as Wright's successor as league commissioner.

In 2009, Wright authored Jim Balsillie's relocation application report to move the Phoenix Coyotes NHL team from Phoenix, Arizona, to Hamilton, Ontario, when the Coyotes went bankrupt.

On May 25, 2010, the Ultimate Fighting Championship announced Wright as the director of operations for UFC Canada. On October 19, 2016, the UFC's Canadian office in Toronto experienced massive layoffs, with approximately 80 percent of the department being let go including Tom Wright.
