= Alexander Govor =

Russian entrepreneur (born 1960)

- Александр Говор
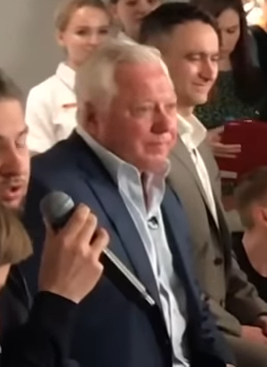
- Govor on June 12, 2022, during the opening of the Vkusno i tochka chains
- Born: Alexander Nikolayevich Govor; June 8, 1960 (age 65); Novokuznetsk, Kemerovo Oblast, Russian Soviet Federative Socialist Republic
- Occupations: Businessman, entrepreneur
- Known for: Owner of Russian fast food restaurant Vkusno i tochka

Alexander Nikolayevich Govor (Russian: Александр Николаевич Говор; born June 8, 1960) is a Russian business magnate and entrepreneur. He is the owner of Russian fast food restaurant Vkusno i tochka, which is based mostly in former McDonald's restaurants closed by McDonald's in response to the 2022 Russian invasion of Ukraine. He bought 850 McDonalds after the Russian invasion of Ukraine caused McDonalds to leave Russia. He bought the rights for McDonalds in Russia for an undisclosed sum.

== Wealth ==
In 2011 Alexander Govor was ranked 344th in the list of the richest Russians with a fortune of 8.2 billion rubles (according to Finance magazine). In 2013 he was close to the top three in the list of billionaires in Kuzbass with a fortune of 6 billion rubles (according to the regional business publication Avant-Partner).

== Family ==
Govor's son is Roman Govor, a member of the Kremlin-aligned ruling party United Russia.

== Awards and honours ==
- Candidate of Technical Sciences
- Honorary Worker of the fuel and energy complex of the Russian Federation
- Honorary Worker of the coal industry of the Russian Federation
- Аull cavalier of the Miner's Glory Medal (1996, 1998, 1999)
- Honorary citizen of the city of Novokuznetsk
