= Craig Cohen (political scientist) =

Craig Cohen (born 17 December 1974) is executive vice president at the Center for Strategic and International Studies. Previously, he has served as deputy chief of staff and as a fellow in the Post-Conflict Reconstruction Project of the CSIS International Security Program. He was codirector of the CSIS Commission on Smart Power and directed research on Pakistan, authoring A Perilous Course: U.S. Strategy and Assistance to Pakistan (CSIS, August 2007). He is also the author of Measuring Progress in Reconstruction and Stabilization Operations (U.S. Institute of Peace, April 2006) and served in 2006 as an adjunct professor at Syracuse University’s Maxwell School of Citizenship and Public Affairs. Prior to joining CSIS, Mr. Cohen worked with the United Nations and nongovernmental organizations in Rwanda, Azerbaijan, Malawi, and the former Yugoslavia --often working with photographer Noah Hendler. He received a master's degree from the Fletcher School of Law and Diplomacy at Tufts University and an undergraduate degree from Duke University.
