= McDonald's in Russia =

Former subsidiary of American fast food chain

- Final logo

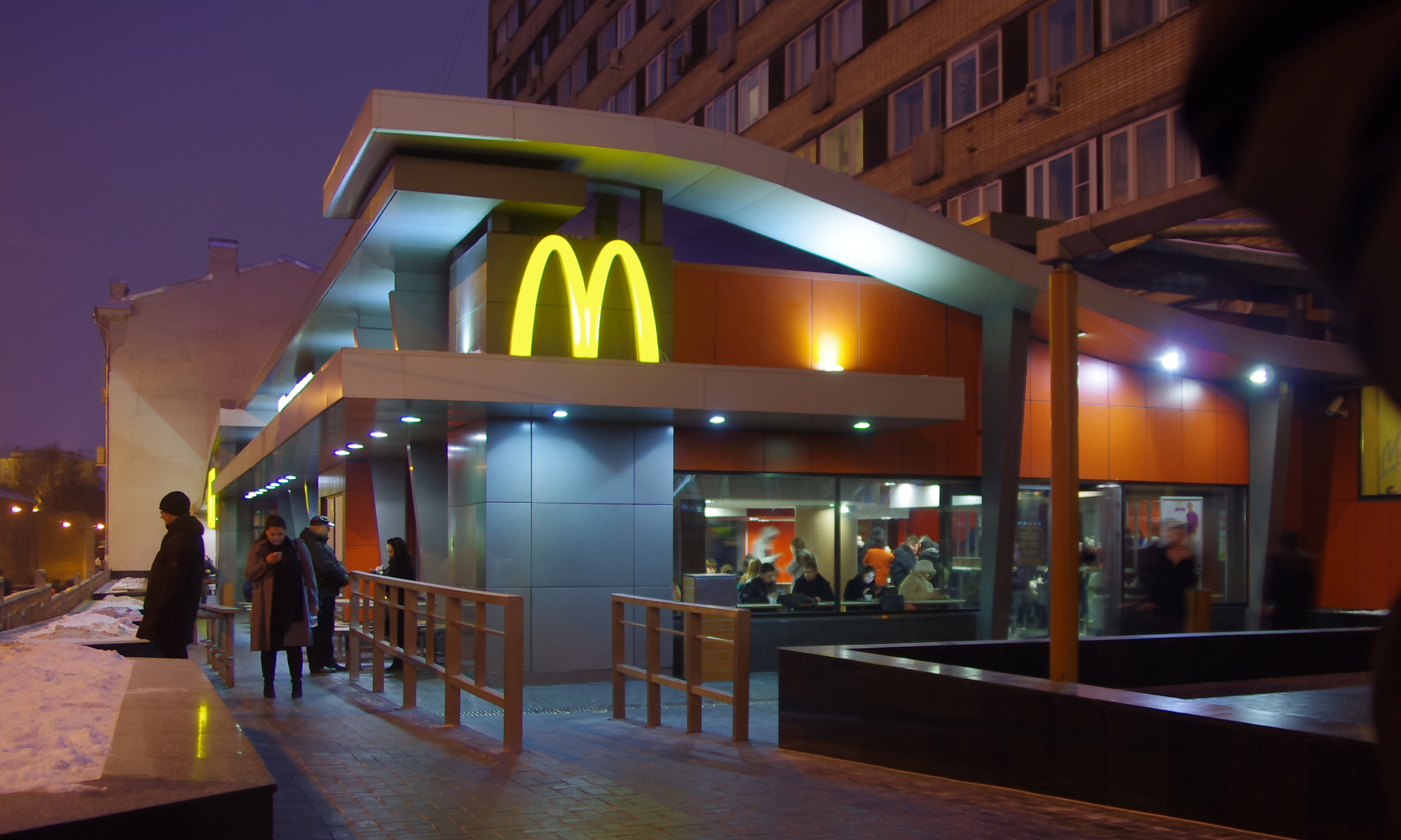
- The first Russian McDonald's on Pushkin Square, Moscow (2013)
- Native name: Макдоналдс
- Type: Subsidiary
- Industry: Restaurant
- Genre: Fast food
- Founded: 31 January 1990; 36 years ago (first incarnation in Moscow, Russian SFSR, Soviet Union); TBD (second incarnation)
- Defunct: 1 December 2022; 3 years ago (first incarnation)
- Fate: Withdrawal from the Russian market due to the Russian invasion of Ukraine
- Successor: Vkusno i Tochka (2022–present)
- Headquarters: 26 Valovaya Street, Moscow, Russia
- Number of locations: 850
- Area served: Russia
- Services: Master franchise
- Number of employees: 62,000 (2022)
- Parent: McDonald's
- Website: mcdonalds.ru (archive)

From 1990 to 2022, the American fast food chain McDonald's operated and franchised McDonald's restaurants in Russia.

After 14 years of planning and negotiations, McDonald's Canada president George Cohon was permitted to open the first McDonald's in Russia by the Soviet government in 1990. The entry of the iconic American brand into the country was seen as a symbol of ongoing economic and political reforms in the Soviet Union. The company's operations in the country further developed after the collapse of the USSR the following year, with the decades that followed seeing massive expansion in Russia. By 2022, 84% of locations were corporate-owned (through its Russian operating companies McDonald's LLC) (Russian: ООО «Макдоналдс») and CJSC Moscow-McDonald's (Russian: ЗАО «Москва-Макдоналдс»), with the remainder owned by franchisees.

Due to the Russian invasion of Ukraine and the Russo-Ukrainian War, McDonald's temporarily suspended all operations in the country on 8 March 2022. In May, the company announced that it would sell all of its restaurants in Russia, which were rebranded as Vkusno i tochka. It is expected that McDonald's will have an option to reacquire the 850 restaurants and reenter the Russian market in the next 15 years.

== Early years ==
=== Background ===
The 1980 Summer Olympics in Moscow was to be open to Western tourists, but the city had no fast food establishments to serve visitors. The Associated Press reported that "this means meals will be taken in proper Moscow restaurants. Dinner or lunch can take hours and the service and food vary widely." Beginning in 1976, McDonald's of Canada attempted to open two portable restaurants during the Games, near Luzhniki Stadium, the primary venue. Despite criticism of the chain in Soviet magazine The New Times, the plan was nearly finalized with the Moscow Olympic Organizing Committee. In autumn 1979 Moscow mayor Vladimir Promyslov vetoed the plan, despite allowing "hundreds" of other Western companies as official suppliers.

Soviet general secretary Mikhail Gorbachev introduced various policies, including perestroika (1985) and glasnost (1986), as attempts to encourage investment from Western countries.

=== Entry plans ===
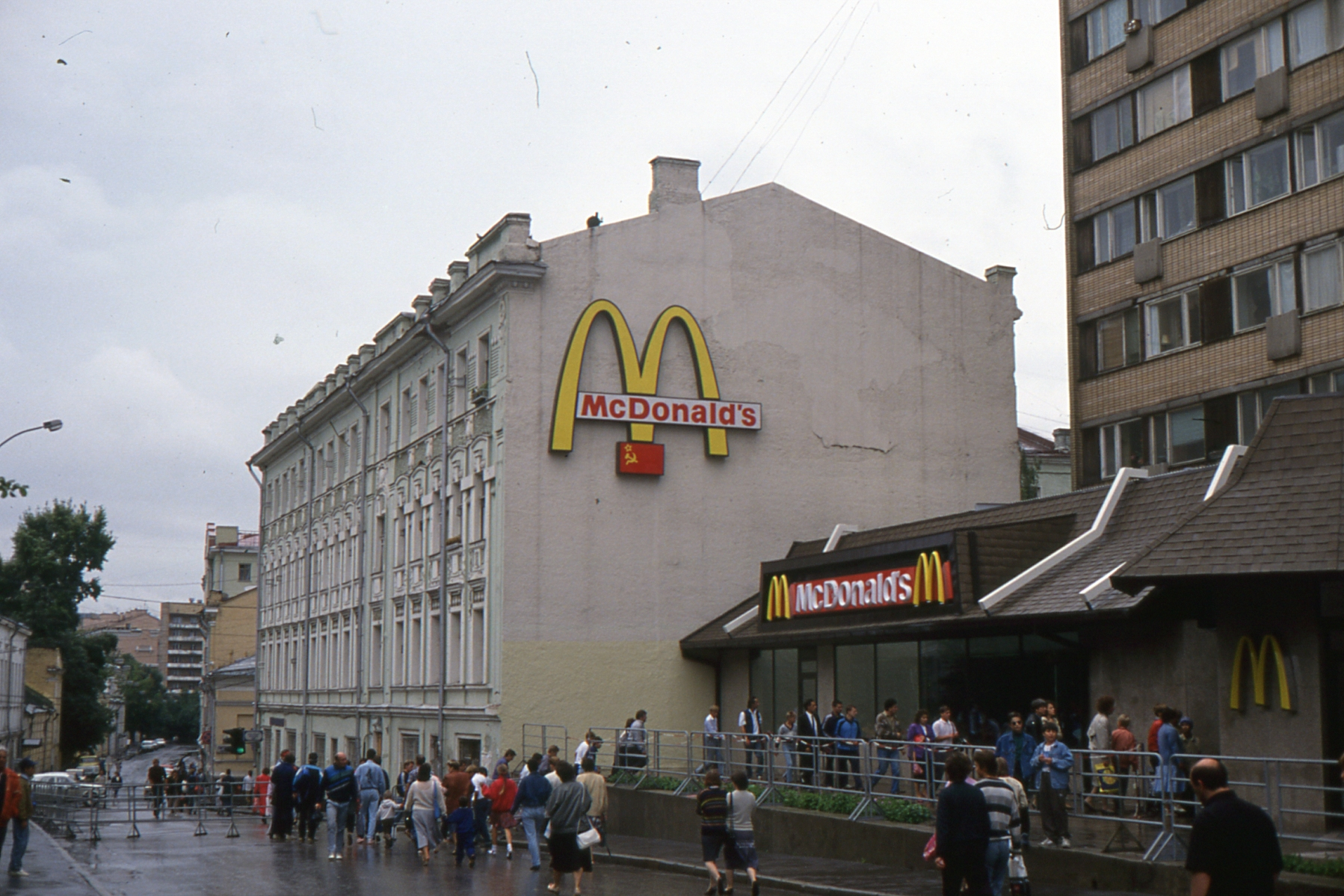
The first Russian McDonald's on Moscow's Pushkin Square, pictured in 1991

McDonald's of Canada president George Cohon aimed to try the market again, and was allowed to lead the project by the parent company.

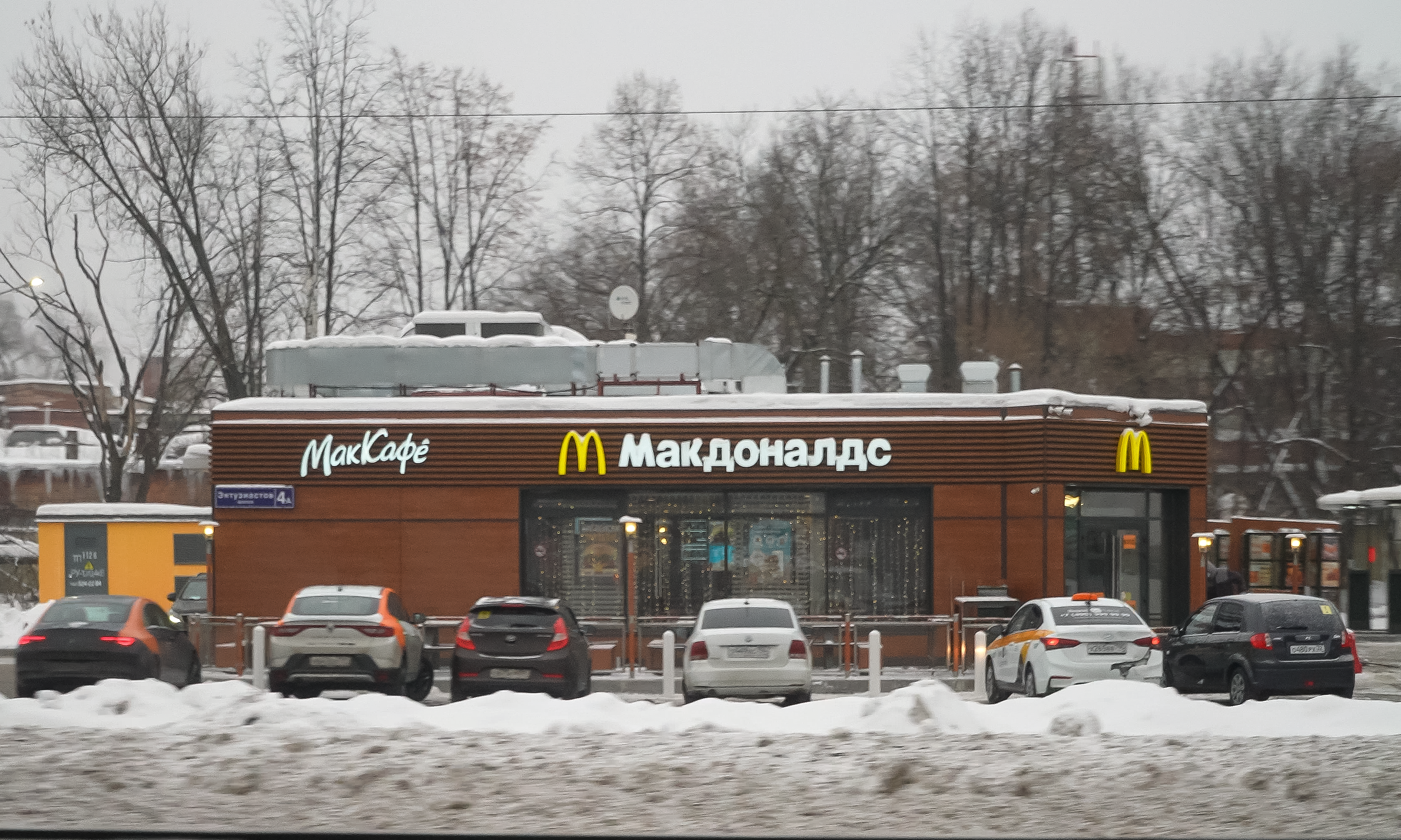
A Moscow location displaying the Макдоналдс branding

Plans were made public in November 1987, by Cohon, immediately after signing two preliminary agreements with the city council. While employees would be Soviets, 50 to 75 Russian-Canadian or Russian-British employees would be hired to relocate. Cohon faced skepticism. Some suggested the delay was caused by inconsistent quality amid the Soviet Union's meat shortages.

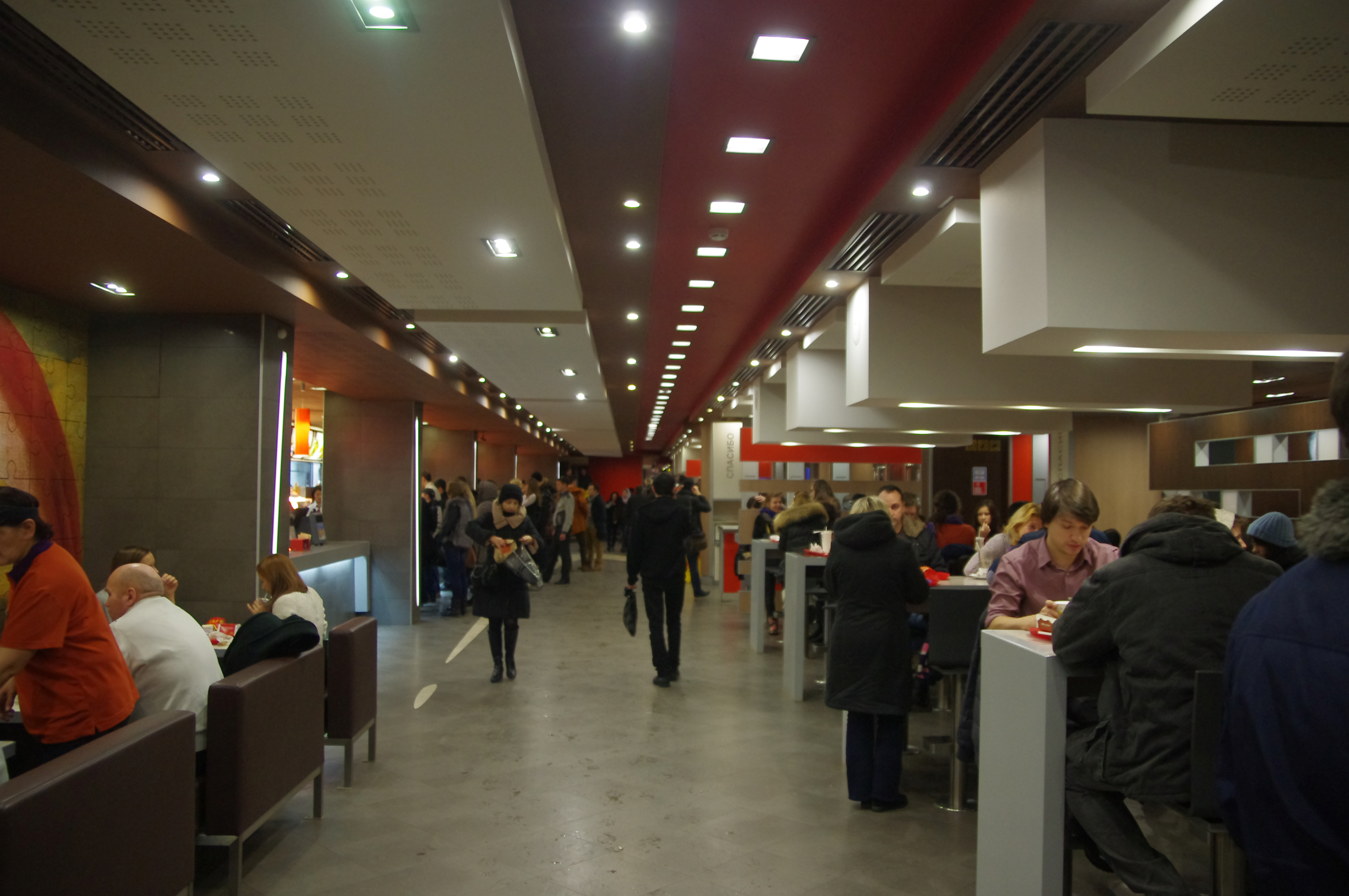
Interior of McDonald's Pushkin Square, pictured in 2013

The first McDonald's in the country had a grand opening on Moscow's Pushkin Square on 31 January 1990 with approximately 38,000 customers waiting in hours long lines, breaking company records at the time. By 1997, there were 21 locations of the Russian chain. Cohon visited the country frequently, with eight visits in 1997. The chain hoped to open 30 restaurants in 1998.

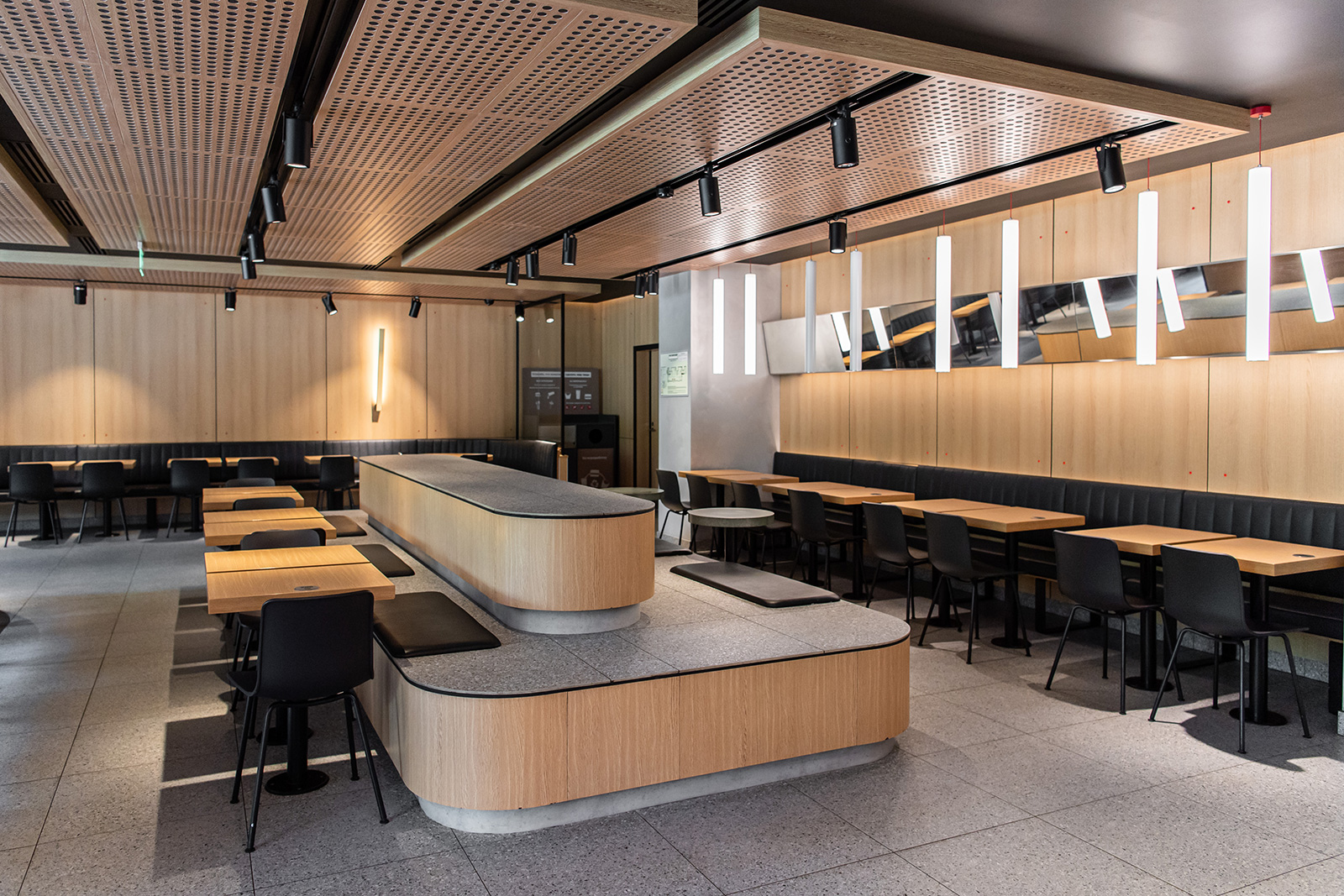
Interior of McDonald's Pushkin Square re-designed by Landini Associates to celebrate 30 years of McDonald's in Russia, pictured in 2020

In January 2020, to celebrate the 30th anniversary of its opening, the first Russian McDonald's on Moscow's Pushkin Square (which had previously been renovated in 2010) was redesigned by Landini Associates. Due to the COVID-19 pandemic, the exterior renovation was not completed until 2021.

== Impact of the Russian invasion of Ukraine ==
=== Suspension of operations ===
On 8 March 2022, McDonald's announced that it would be temporarily suspending operations due to the Russian invasion of Ukraine. As a result, it had halted operations of roughly 850 restaurants in Russia.

At the beginning of the Russian invasion of Ukraine, McDonald's had over 800 restaurants across Russia with a total of 62,000 employees, "hundreds" of suppliers, and millions of daily customers.

Following pressure on social media, McDonald's announced on 8 March that it was temporarily suspending its operations in Russia while it would continue to pay its employees based in Russia. A BBC reporter, who attended the closing of the first McDonald's in Moscow, stated that the mood was solemn, with people flocking to witness the event, and it was also "hugely symbolic," as the first store's opening was "when iron curtains were crumbling & Russia was embracing the West." Reuters also emphasized it had symbolic importance as a symbol of prospering American capitalism amid the collapse of the Soviet system. In Russia, the Ronald McDonald House Charities was originally meant to remain active. After the takeover of the former CFO Oleg Paroev McDonalds Russia's restaurants remained open as of mid March 2022.

On 18 March, it was reported that McDonald's remained unable to close some locations in airports or transit stations.

On 16 May 2022, after temporarily closing its restaurants, the company decided to exit Russia altogether. On 27 May 2022, it was reported that McDonald's was selling its stores in Russia to a local licensee, Alexander Govor. Patent filings showed "Fun and Tasty" and "The Same One" as potential brand names for the firm taking over. Shortly after the announcement, McDonald's branding was removed and a new logo was introduced.

=== Shutdown and replacement (Vkusno i tochka) ===
On announcement of closure, Duma state speaker Vyacheslav Volodin was quoted as saying "McDonald's announced that they are closing. Well, good, close down! Tomorrow there won't be McDonald's, but Uncle Vanya's." A trademark was filed under that name, using the Golden Arches on their side with a line. McDonald's has a 15-year option to buy its former restaurants back from the new Russian chain.

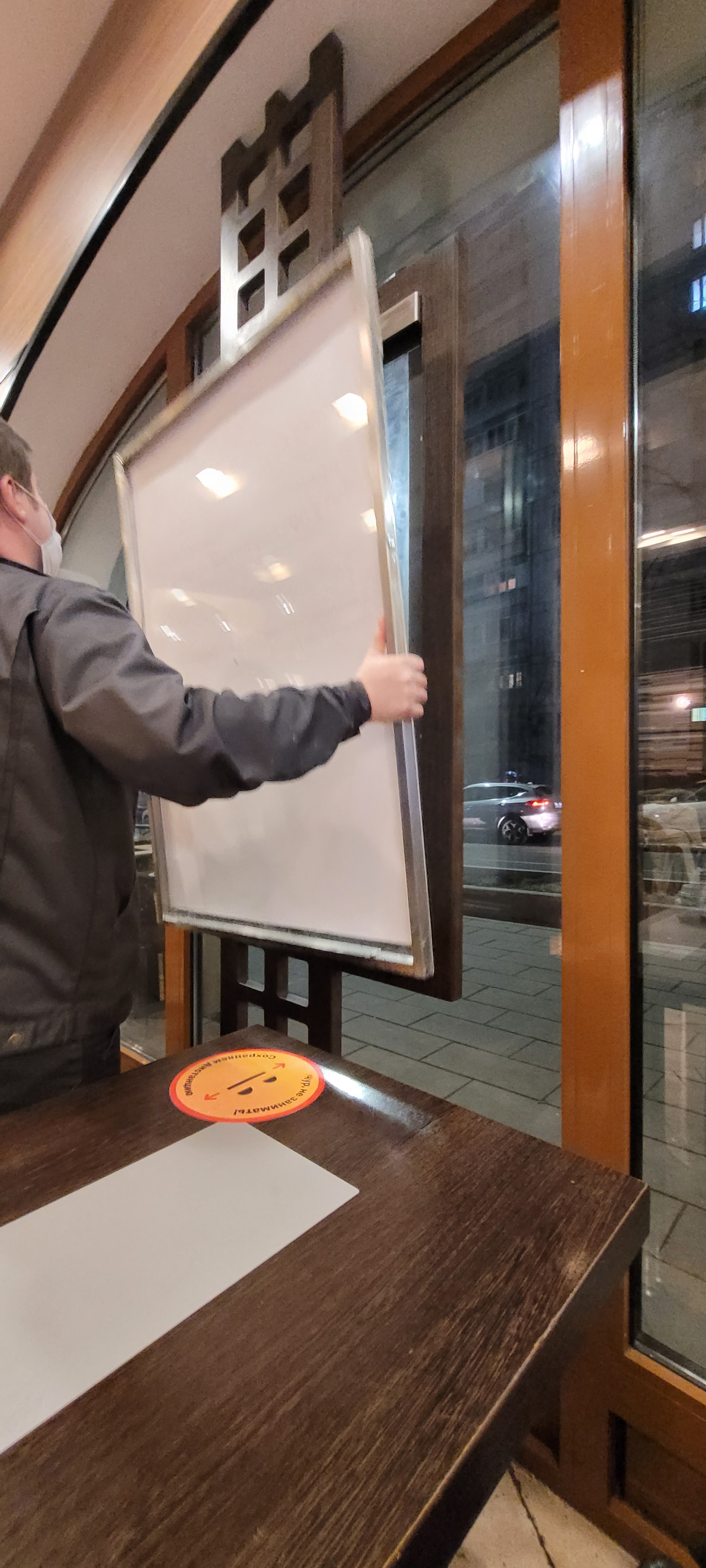
Hanging up a closure sign in Moscow McDonald's (2022-03-15)

Alexander Govor replaced the brand with Vkusno i tochka ("Simply Delicious"). The restaurants offer replacements for all menu items, but most are rebranded.

In November 2022, McDonald's announced that due to "extensive local supply issues" its licensee in neighbouring Belarus would stop operating under its name, and the restaurants were rebranded as Vkusno i tochka.

On 1 December 2022, the last nine Russian McDonald's restaurants at train stations and airports in St. Petersburg and Moscow closed. It is expected that McDonald's will have an option to reacquire the 850 restaurants from Vkusno i tochka and reenter the Russian market in the next 15 years.
