= Mark Cohon =

Former Canadian Football League Commissioner

Mark Cohon OOnt MSM
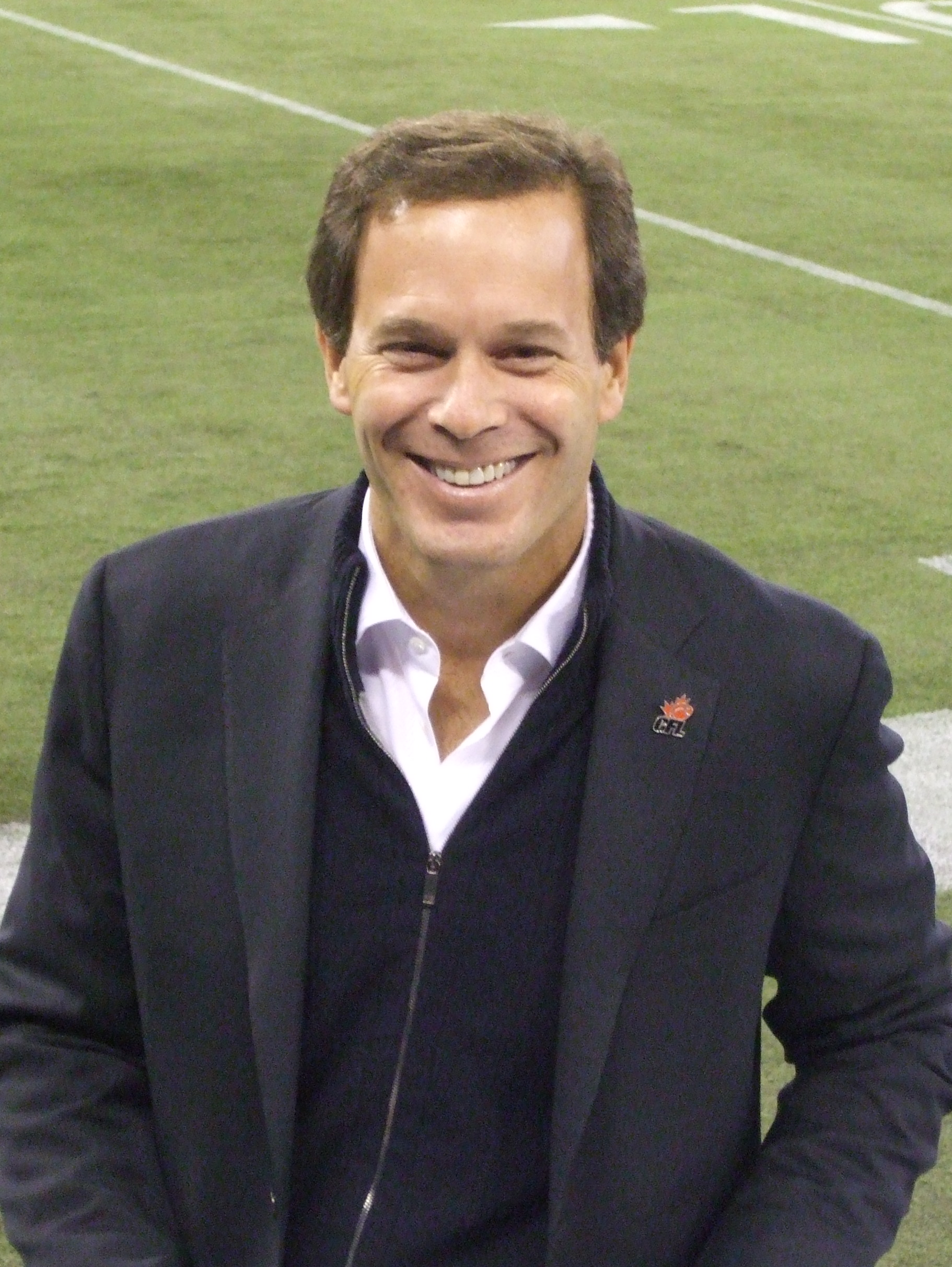
- Mark Cohon in 2009

Profile
- Position: Commissioner

Personal information
- Born: March 16, 1966 (age 60); Chicago, Illinois, U.S.

Career information
- High school: Upper Canada College
- College: Northwestern University

Career history
- 2006–2012: Ontario Science Centre (Chair)
- 2007–2015: Canadian Football League (Comm.)
- 2015–present: Canadian Academy of Recording Arts and Sciences (Chairman)

Mark Steven Cohon, OOnt MSM (born March 16, 1966) is a Canadian businessman who is the chairman of the Canadian Academy of Recording Arts and Sciences (CARAS). He was also the 12th commissioner of the Canadian Football League. He was appointed as commissioner in 2007 succeeding Tom Wright.

== Early life ==
Cohon was born in Chicago, Illinois, and moved to Toronto, Ontario when he was two years old. The son of McDonald's Canada founder George Cohon, he holds both Canadian and American citizenship.

== Education ==
Cohon is a graduate of Upper Canada College and Northwestern University with a Bachelor of Science majoring in communication studies.

== Sports marketing ==
Cohon worked for the National Basketball Association as head of international marketing and Major League Baseball International as head of corporate development. He then became president and chief executive officer of AudienceView Ticketing, a company which sells ticketing systems and services to sports, arts and entertainment events.

== Ontario Science Centre chairman ==
In 2003, Cohon was appointed to the board of trustees of the Ontario Science Centre and then named Chair in 2006. In 2013, he was made a Member of the Order of Ontario and in 2015, he was awarded the Meritorious Service Medal.

== CFL commissioner ==
In 2007, Mark Cohon succeeded Tom Wright as the Commissioner of the Canadian Football League. Under the direction of Cohon the CFL went through a remarkable renaissance. From record TV ratings to the building of $2 billion in new stadiums to the expansion back to Ottawa, to overseeing two labour agreements to the national celebration of the 100th Grey Cup and finally to the tripling of TV revenues with a new contract with Bell media, Cohon is credited in bringing back the CFL to prominence in Canada.

In August 2014, Cohon announced that he would not seek a third term as CFL Commissioner, announcing that he had completed everything he set out to accomplish and it was time to seek new challenges in his career. He stepped down on January 9, 2015, and was replaced by board chairperson Jim Lawson on an interim basis. Jeffrey Orridge was appointed the new CFL Commissioner effective April 29, 2015.

== Post CFL commissioner career ==
On September 29, 2015, Cohon was appointed as the new chairman of the Canadian Academy of Recording Arts and Sciences (CARAS), a non-profit organization responsible for "preserv(ing) and enhanc(ing) the Canadian music industry and to contribute toward higher artistic and industry standards" as well as overseeing the annual Juno Awards for the Canadian music industry. Given his success at transforming the CFL, the CARAS board wanted to bring in an experienced executive outside the music industry to transform the future of the Juno Awards.

Mark is also Chair of Toronto Global, an organization funded by three levels of government charged with promoting the Toronto region around the world and attracting foreign direct investment. The Toronto Global team led the RFP process for Amazon HQ2, making it to the short list of 20 North American cities and the only Canadian city on that list. Their Amazon HQ2 bid book was widely praised as a document that truly captured the excitement and growth that is happening in the Toronto region.

On the business front, Georgian Bay Spirit Co shows Mark as chairman and partner in that company. According to their website, they won best Vodka in the world at the San Francisco Spirits Competition and are producers of the best selling cooler in the LCBO, Georgian Bay Gin Smash.

== Personal life ==
In 2002, Cohon married Suzanne Elizabeth Lucido.
