= Lakes of Temagami =

Lakes in Temagami, Ontario, Canada

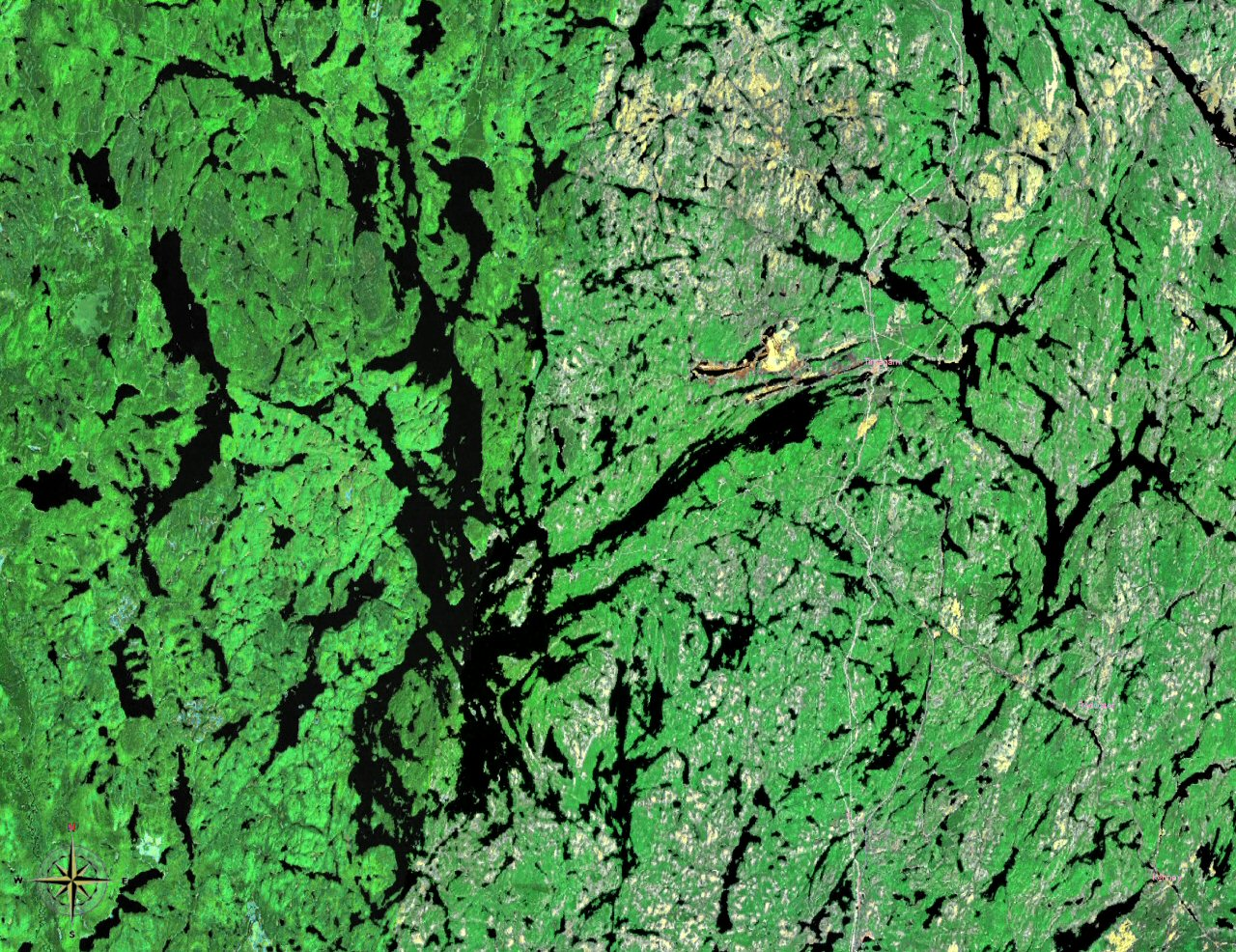
Temagami is vastly covered by lakes, of which Lake Temagami (middle) is the largest.

There are more than 200 named lakes located partially or entirely within the Municipality of Temagami, Northeastern Ontario, Canada. They are located in all 25 geographic townships comprising this 1,906.42 km^{2} (736.07 mi^{2}) municipality. The largest, by both area and volume, is Lake Temagami. It contains more than 1,200 islands and 1,000 km (620 mi) of shoreline. Other significant lakes include Cross Lake, Gull Lake, Net Lake, Obabika Lake and Rabbit Lake.

Temagami's lakes are situated in two watersheds. To the east, the Ottawa River basin drains lake water via the Matabitchuan River, which flows into Lake Timiskaming then enters the Ottawa River. The Great Lakes Basin to the west drains lake water via the Sturgeon River which flows into Lake Nipissing then enters the French River, eventually reaching Georgian Bay of Lake Huron.

The lakes are a main source of tourism and recreational activity in the Municipality of Temagami. This includes camping, canoeing, fishing, cottaging and youth camps (e.g. Keewaydin), as well as lodge and resort activity. The first recorded tourist was an oblate priest named Charles Paradis, who visited the area in July 1880 and eventually settled on Lake Temagami's Sandy Inlet. Despite its remote location and inaccessibility by rail until 1904, the Temagami area attracted increasing numbers of hardy tourists who arrived, as Paradis had done, by canoe from Lake Timiskaming in the east, or from the west travelling up the Sturgeon River from its intersection with the Canadian Pacific Railway.

A wide variety of fish species are found in Temagami lakes, including walleye, smallmouth bass, lake trout, rainbow trout, brook trout, northern pike and perch.

== List ==
The list is alphabetized by the name of the lake, with the words lake and the ignored. To sort on a different column, click on the arrows in the header row.

=== A ===
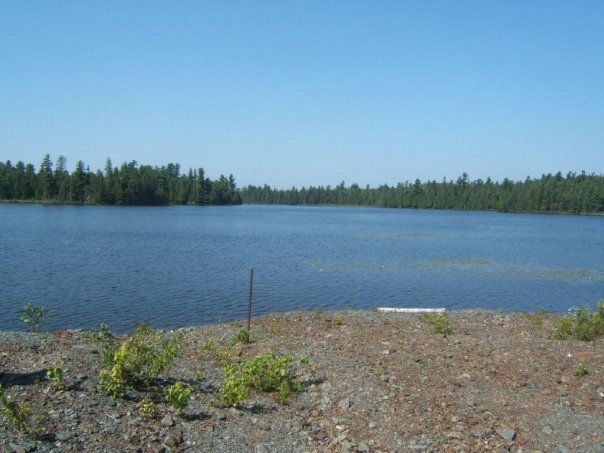
View of Arsenic Lake from Leckie Mine on its eastern shore

Name	Township(s)	Coordinates	NTS map	Status	CGNDB id
Aileen Lake	Phyllis, Torrington, Vogt	46°52′43″N 80°1′4″W	041I/16	Official	FABYR
Allan Lake	Belfast	47°1′6″N 80°12′20″W	041P/01	Official	FACLP
Alfreda Lake	Strathy	47°6′47″N 79°52′4″W	031M/04	Official	FACIT
Angus Lake	Askin, Law	46°53′49″N 79°45′35″W	031L/13	Official	FADEP
Anima Nipissing Lake	Banting	47°15′34″N 79°54′22″W	031M/04	Official	FADES
Arsenic Lake	Strathy	47°5′34″N 79°48′20″W	031M/04	Official	FADVE
Aston Lake	Aston	47°13′28″N 80°6′28″W	041P/01	Official	FEFVA

=== B ===
Name	Township	Coordinates	NTS map	Status	CGNDB id
Banana Lake	Belfast	47°2′6″N 80°10′38″W	041P/01	Official	FAESC
Barmac Lake	Aston	47°10′26″N 80°5′51″W	041P/01	Official	FAFBA
Beach Lake	Sisk	46°44′10″N 79°47′46″W	031L/12	Official	FAFPT
Beaverpond Lake	Banting	47°9′9″N 80°0′29″W	041P/01	Official	FAGLY
Belanger Lake	Olive	46°49′39″N 79°49′35″W	031L/13	Official	FAGUA
Bernice Lake	Strathy	47°7′58″N 79°47′17″W	031M/04	Official	FAHIZ
Birch Lake	Joan	47°1′20″N 80°2′47″W	041P/01	Official	FAIRS
Black Duck Lake	Best	47°9′35″N 79°47′37″W	031M/04	Official	FAJKE
Blueberry Lake	Cassels	47°4′37″N 79°39′57″W	031M/04	Official	FAKCP
Bob Lake	Canton	47°10′23″N 80°15′45″W	041P/01	Official	FDJFT
Bogie Lake	Cassels	47°6′18″N 79°43′19″W	031M/04	Official	FDJIK
Boucher Lake	Clement	46°51′21″N 80°10′28″W	041I/16	Official	FAKTD
Boulton Lake	Riddell	47°0′28″N 79°42′2″W	031M/04	Official	FAKVF
Boyce Lake	Milne	46°50′2″N 79°37′48″W	031L/13	Official	FALCA
Breeches Lake	Best	47°14′3″N 79°52′38″W	031M/04	Official	FALLW
Broom Lake	Briggs	46°59′49″N 79°54′46″W	031M/04	Official	FALXQ
Brophy Lake	Law	46°56′0″N 79°49′20″W	031L/13	Official	FALXW
Browns Lake	Cynthia	47°6′57″N 80°5′18″W	041P/01	Official	FAMCR
Business Lake	Chambers	47°3′49″N 79°58′37″W	031M/04	Official	FANIZ

=== C ===
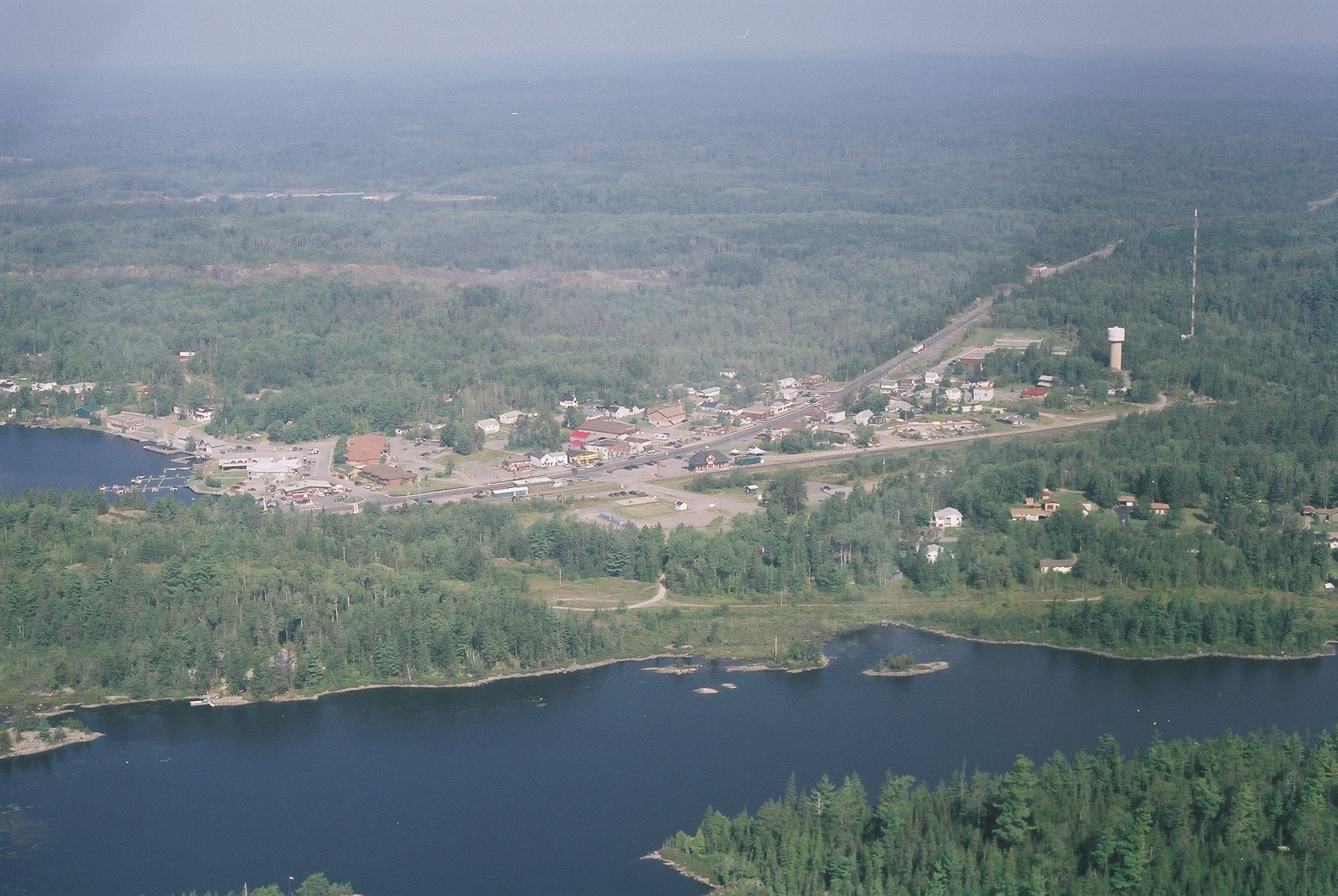
An aerial view of the Temagami townsite, Lake Temagami (centre-left) and Caribou Lake (bottom)

Name	Township(s)	Coordinates	NTS map	Status	CGNDB id
Caribou Lake	Strathcona, Strathy	47°3′37″N 79°47′9″W	031M/04	Official	FAOUS
Carrying Lake	Banting	47°10′52″N 80°0′4″W	031M/04	Official	FAPCJ
Cassels Lake	Cassels, Riddell	47°4′9″N 79°43′10″W	031M/04	Official	FDJUY
Chambers Lake	Chambers	47°6′35″N 79°58′17″W	031M/04	Official	FAPVF
Charley Lake	Chambers	47°4′29″N 79°57′39″W	031M/04	Official	FAQAO
Chokecherry Lake	Milne	46°51′8″N 79°38′54″W	031L/13	Official	FAQRE
Christie Lake	Sisk	46°43′35″N 79°46′14″W	031L/12	Official	FAQTB
Christy Lake	Law	46°56′29″N 79°47′12″W	031L/13	Official	FAQTY
Clem Lake	Vogt	46°47′51″N 80°9′30″W	041I/16	Official	FAROK
Command Lake	Briggs	47°1′47″N 79°56′57″W	031M/04	Official	FASLI
Conross Lake	Sisk	46°44′45″N 79°45′37″W	031L/12	Official	FASRR
Contact Lake	Banting	47°10′7″N 79°56′34″W	031M/04	Official	FASSZ
Cooke Lake	Strathy	47°5′15″N 79°50′25″W	031M/04	Official	FASUH
Coppersand Lake	Askin	47°8′44″N 80°3′47″W	041P/01	Official	FATAI
Crash Lake	Chambers	47°5′58″N 79°56′17″W	031M/04	Official	FAUAG
Crest Lake	Scholes	46°55′38″N 80°12′23″W	041I/16	Official	FAUFK
Cross Lake	Torrington, Yates	46°52′18″N 79°57′58″W	031L/13	Official	FAUNF
Cummings Lake	Scholes	46°56′56″N 80°12′18″W	041I/16	Official	FAUXP

=== D ===
Name	Township(s)	Coordinates	NTS map	Status	CGNDB id
Dean Lake	Phyllis	46°55′33″N 80°8′13″W	041I/16	Official	FAVWD
Denedus Lake	Yates	46°57′7″N 79°55′26″W	031L/13	Official	FAWJJ
Diamond Lake	Canton	47°12′16″N 80°14′51″W	041P/01	Official	FDJRT
Doris Lake	Strathy	47°5′12″N 79°51′8″W	031M/04	Official	FAZJG
Driftwood Lake	Briggs, Strathcona	46°58′55″N 79°52′47″W	031L/13	Official	FAZTP
Duncan Lake	Best, Cassels	47°8′45″N 79°44′55″W	031M/04	Official	FBAKH
Dwy Lake	Law, Olive	46°53′18″N 79°48′59″W	031L/13	Official	FBASE

=== E ===
Name	Township	Coordinates	NTS map	Status	CGNDB id
Echo Lake	Clement	46°49′7″N 80°10′44″W	041I/16	Official	FBBPE
Eye Lake	LeRoche	47°3′52″N 80°9′58″W	041P/01	Official	FBDFP

=== F ===
Name	Township	Coordinates	NTS map	Status	CGNDB id
Ferguson Lake	Strathy	47°8′21″N 79°45′46″W	031M/04	Official	FBDXP
Ferrim Lake	Cynthia	47°4′55″N 80°0′57″W	041P/01	Official	FEIOK
Flapjack Lake	Sisk	46°47′49″N 79°48′42″W	031L/13	Official	FBEEJ
Florence Lake	Sisk	46°44′40″N 79°51′3″W	031L/12	Official	FBELS
Foley Lake	Briggs	47°2′17″N 79°57′53″W	031M/04	Official	FBEQK
Frances Lake	Milne	46°50′45″N 79°40′25″W	031L/13	Official	FBFKS
Frawley Lake	Sisk	46°45′0″N 79°49′35″W	031L/12	Official	FBFRB
Friday Lake	Best	47°12′41″N 79°29′12″W	031M/04	Official	FBFYE

=== G ===
Name	Township(s)	Coordinates	NTS map	Status	CGNDB id
Geoffrey Lake	Banting	47°12′48″N 79°54′16″W	031M/04	Official	FBGZM
Gilbert Lake	Banting	47°12′20″N 79°54′23″W	031M/04	Official	FBHIR
Goethe Lake	Best	47°12′54″N 79°46′22″W	031M/04	Official	FBIBD
Gosselin Lake	Cassels	47°5′45″N 79°41′53″W	031M/04	Official	FBIPR
Goward Lake	Strathy	47°5′49″N 79°48′47″W	031M/04	Official	FBITT
Granite Lake	Best	47°9′53″N 79°44′50″W	031M/04	Official	FBJAC
Gravel Pit Pond	Law	46°56′11″N 79°45′35″W	031L/13	Official	FBJJY
Greenlaw Lake	Law	46°56′22″N 79°50′44″W	031L/13	Official	FBJWB
Greyowl Lake	LeRoche	47°4′53″N 80°11′25″W	041P/01	Official	FBKDA
Gull Lake	Clement, Joan, Phyllis, Scholes	46°55′19″N 80°11′6″W	041I/16	Official	FBKOP
Guppy Lake	Banting, Chambers	47°8′22″N 79°59′35″W	031M/04	Official	FBKTR

=== H ===
Name	Township(s)	Coordinates	NTS map	Status	CGNDB id
Hangstone Lake	Olive, Torrington	46°49′12″N 79°53′24″W	031L/13	Official	FBLOY
Hansen Lake	Chambers	47°7′13″N 79°55′5″W	031M/04	Official	FBLQW
Hardwood Lake	Briggs	47°0′24″N 79°59′8″W	031M/04	Official	FBLUW
Hay Lake	Briggs	47°1′6″N 79°56′36″W	031M/04	Official	FBMOW
Herbert Lake	Joan	46°58′48″N 80°8′17″W	041I/16	Official	FBNGB
Herridge Lake	Law, Strathcona	46°58′57″N 79°49′30″W	031L/13	Official	FBNIM
Hillcrest Lake	Joan	47°0′52″N 80°3′24″W	041P/01	Official	FBNVE
Hook Lake	Strathy	47°8′10″N 79°50′47″W	031M/04	Official	FBOPB
Hornet Lake	Askin	46°56′26″N 79°44′54″W	031L/13	Official	FBOUY
Hush Hush Lake	Cynthia	47°8′12″N 80°2′54″W	041P/01	Official	FBPRO

=== I ===
Name	Township	Coordinates	NTS map	Status	CGNDB id
Iceland Lake	Strathcona	46°59′47″N 79°51′56″W	031L/13	Official	FBPWA
Indigo Lake	Joan	47°2′56″N 80°3′16″W	041P/01	Official	FBQEA
Ingall Lake	Law	46°54′38″N 79°46′39″W	031L/13	Official	FBQEI
Iron Lake	Chambers	47°4′0″N 79°55′0″W	031M/04	Rescinded	FBQMW

=== J ===
Byers Bay of Jumping Cariboo Lake from Camp Caribou

Name	Township(s)	Coordinates	NTS map	Status	CGNDB id
Jackpine Lake	Banting, Chambers	47°8′44″N 79°56′3″W	031M/04	Official	FBRBM
James Lake	Best	47°10′41″N 79°44′26″W	031M/04	Official	FBRHD
Jamieson Lake	Banting	47°9′22″N 79°59′37″W	031M/04	Official	FBRHY
Jessie Lake	Strathcona	47°2′28″N 79°48′14″W	031M/04	Official	FBRSJ
Jumping Cariboo Lake	Law, Olive	46°52′57″N 79°46′32″W	031L/13	Official	FBSOZ
Jumpingcat Lake	Belfast, Joan	47°1′48″N 80°9′59″W	041P/01	Official	FBSPA

=== K ===
Name	Township(s)	Coordinates	NTS map	Status	CGNDB id
Kanichee Lake	Strathy	47°7′15″N 79°50′12″W	031M/04	Official	FBSZO
Karol Lake	Strathcona	47°1′17″N 79°48′45″W	031M/04	Official	FBTCJ
Kettle Lake	Milne, Olive	46°52′14″N 79°45′2″W	031L/13	Official	FBUFR
Kokoko Lake	Cynthia	47°5′20″N 80°2′11″W	041P/01	Official	FBVHK

=== L ===
Name	Township(s)	Coordinates	NTS map	Status	CGNDB id
Lambert Lake	Milne	46°48′32″N 79°44′7″W	031L/13	Official	FBWAW
Laroche Lake	Sisk	46°44′15″N 79°46′34″W	031L/12	Official	FBWJC
Le Roche Lake	LeRoche	47°3′58″N 80°12′46″W	041P/01	Official	FBXHS
Lenore Lake	Banting	47°9′0″N 79°57′48″W	031M/04	Official	FBXFY
Leroy Lake	Cassels	47°4′35″N 79°44′31″W	031M/04	Official	FBXHX
Liberty Lake	Aston	47°10′56″N 80°3′37″W	041P/01	Official	FBXLX
Link Lake	Strathy	47°4′18″N 79°49′4″W	031M/04	Official	FBXVF
Little Donald Lake	Vogt	46°49′37″N 80°6′17″W	041I/16	Official	FBYJB
Longbow Lake	Joan, Scholes	46°57′52″N 80°10′10″W	041I/16	Official	FCAHZ
Lowell Lake	Strathcona	47°0′35″N 79°47′58″W	031M/04	Official	FCBPD
Lower Bass Lake	Belfast	46°59′2″N 80°12′34″W	041I/16	Official	FCBPL
Lower Redwater Lake	Askin, Milne	46°53′3″N 79°38′2″W	031L/13	Official	FCBUH
Lower Twin Lake	Riddell	46°58′47″N 79°44′14″W	031L/13	Official	FCBVV
Lowery Lake	Torrington	46°51′40″N 79°53′21″W	031L/13	Official	FCBWK
Lundy Lake	Banting	47°11′24″N 79°54′37″W	031M/04	Official	FCCDH

=== M ===
Name	Township	Coordinates	NTS map	Status	CGNDB id
Maille Lake	Strathcona	47°0′59″N 79°48′42″W	031M/04	Official	FDQRG
Malloch Lake	Cynthia	47°4′43″N 80°3′4″W	041P/01	Official	FCDFN
Mann Lake	Olive	46°51′48″N 79°50′51″W	031L/13	Official	FDKNP
Mannajigama Lake	Banting	47°13′43″N 79°54′23″W	031M/04	Official	FDKNE
Marian Lake	Sisk	46°46′18″N 79°47′6″W	031L/13	Official	FDNDE
Marten Lake	Sisk	46°42′13″N 79°43′43″W	031L/12	Official	FCDPG
Maureen Lake	Strathy	47°6′0″N 79°51′49″W	031M/04	Official	FCECO
McAdam Lake	Torrington	46°52′16″N 79°55′31″W	031L/13	Official	FCEHD
McCarthy Lake	Belfast	47°0′23″N 80°10′19″W	041P/01	Official	FCEJX
McLaren Lake	Briggs	47°1′29″N 79°57′56″W	031M/04	Official	FDPIA
McLean Lake	Banting	47°11′41″N 79°58′22″W	031M/04	Official	FDPJN
McNab Lake	Best	47°9′48″N 79°40′18″W	031M/04	Official	FDPNG
Milne Lake	Milne	46°49′11″N 79°41′57″W	031L/13	Official	FDUWT
Monty Lake	Cassels	47°8′0″N 79°43′42″W	031M/04	Official	FDVPY
Moon Lake	Sisk	46°43′15″N 79°51′34″W	031L/12	Official	FCESF
Moosehead Lake	Belfast	47°0′59″N 80°10′39″W	041P/01	Official	FDWHE
Mountain Lake	Best	47°13′51″N 79°49′56″W	031M/04	Official	FCEYN
Myth Lake	Best	47°8′54″N 79°38′4″W	031M/04	Official	FDLLR

=== N ===
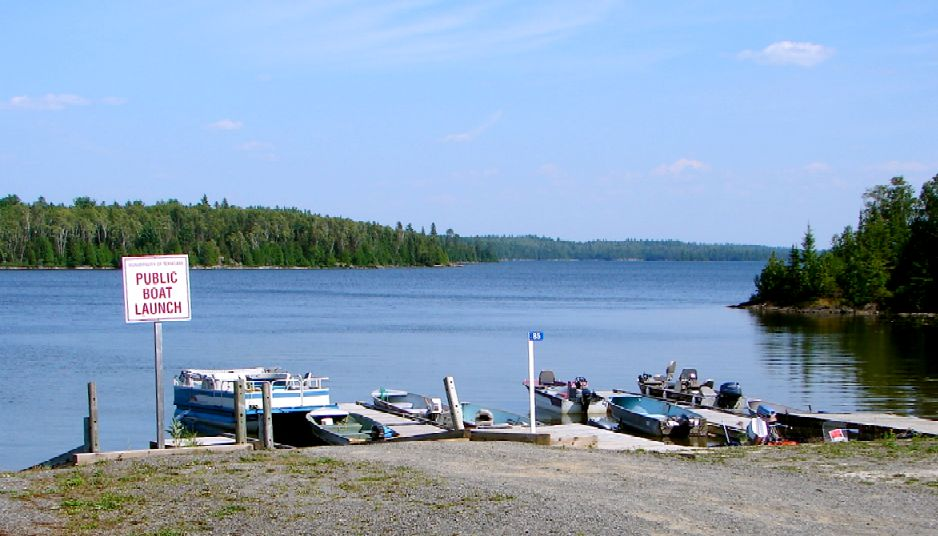
Net Lake boat launch in Temagami North

Name	Township(s)	Coordinates	NTS map	Status	CGNDB id
Nellem Lake	Chambers	47°6′10″N 79°57′53″W	031M/04	Official	FDMYM
Net Lake	Best, Cassels, Strathy	47°6′58″N 79°47′15″W	031M/04	Official	FDONK
Norris Lake	Olive	46°51′19″N 79°52′10″W	031L/13	Official	FDYMX
North Milne Lake	Law	46°57′22″N 79°47′1″W	031L/13	Official	FCGEC

=== O ===
Name	Township(s)	Coordinates	NTS map	Status	CGNDB id
Obabika Lake	Belfast, LeRoche	47°2′37″N 80°15′16″W	041P/01	Official	FCGLS
Obashkong Lake	Cassels	47°6′36″N 79°39′54″W	031M/04	Official	FCGMH
O'Connor Lake	Chambers, Strathy	47°4′15″N 79°52′48″W	031M/04	Official	FCGOY
Olier Lake	Yates	46°57′42″N 79°56′20″W	031L/13	Official	FCGXN
Olive Lake	Olive	46°48′39″N 79°48′46″W	031L/13	Official	FCGXX
Opechee Lake	Sisk	46°46′57″N 79°49′40″W	031L/13	Official	FENBI
Opechee Boys Lake	Olive, Sisk	46°47′44″N 79°49′57″W	031L/13	Official	FENBF
Owaissa Lake	Best	47°9′10″N 79°46′39″W	031M/04	Official	FDPVQ

=== P ===
Name	Township(s)	Coordinates	NTS map	Status	CGNDB id
Packsack Lake	Olive	46°51′18″N 79°45′59″W	031L/13	Official	FDPZX
Pan Lake	Olive	46°50′29″N 79°47′52″W	031L/13	Official	FDRDZ
Pancake Lake	Milne	46°52′30″N 79°45′12″W	031L/13	Official	FDRDJ
Panet Lake	Milne	46°48′5″N 79°44′54″W	031L/13	Official	FDRDT
Pat Lake	Vogt	46°50′20″N 80°5′16″W	041I/16	Official	FCHEF
Pats Lake	Phyllis, Vogt	46°53′8″N 80°2′6″W	041I/16	Official	FCHFA
Petraut Lake	Best	47°8′59″N 79°43′47″W	031M/04	Official	FDOWX
Pig Lake	Law	46°56′2″N 79°47′52″W	031L/13	Official	FDQLE
Pigot Lake	Briggs	47°2′59″N 79°54′30″W	031M/04	Official	FDQLI
Pineview Lake	Briggs	47°3′7″N 79°58′26″W	031M/04	Official	FDTJB
Pingue Lake	Strathcona	47°2′53″N 79°46′49″W	031M/04	Official	FDTJH
Pishabo Lake	Cassels	47°7′3″N 79°43′12″W	031M/04	Official	FDTMF
Pleasant Lake	Riddell, Strathcona	47°2′53″N 79°45′35″W	031M/04	Official	FDZRO
Pot Lake	Olive	46°49′39″N 79°51′23″W	031L/13	Official	FESPH
Pozniak Lake	Sisk	46°46′4″N 79°49′41″W	031L/13	Official	FEAAH

=== Q ===
Name	Township	Coordinates	NTS map	Status	CGNDB id
Quenneville Lake	Olive	46°50′46″N 79°50′9″W	031L/13	Official	FCJCD

=== R ===
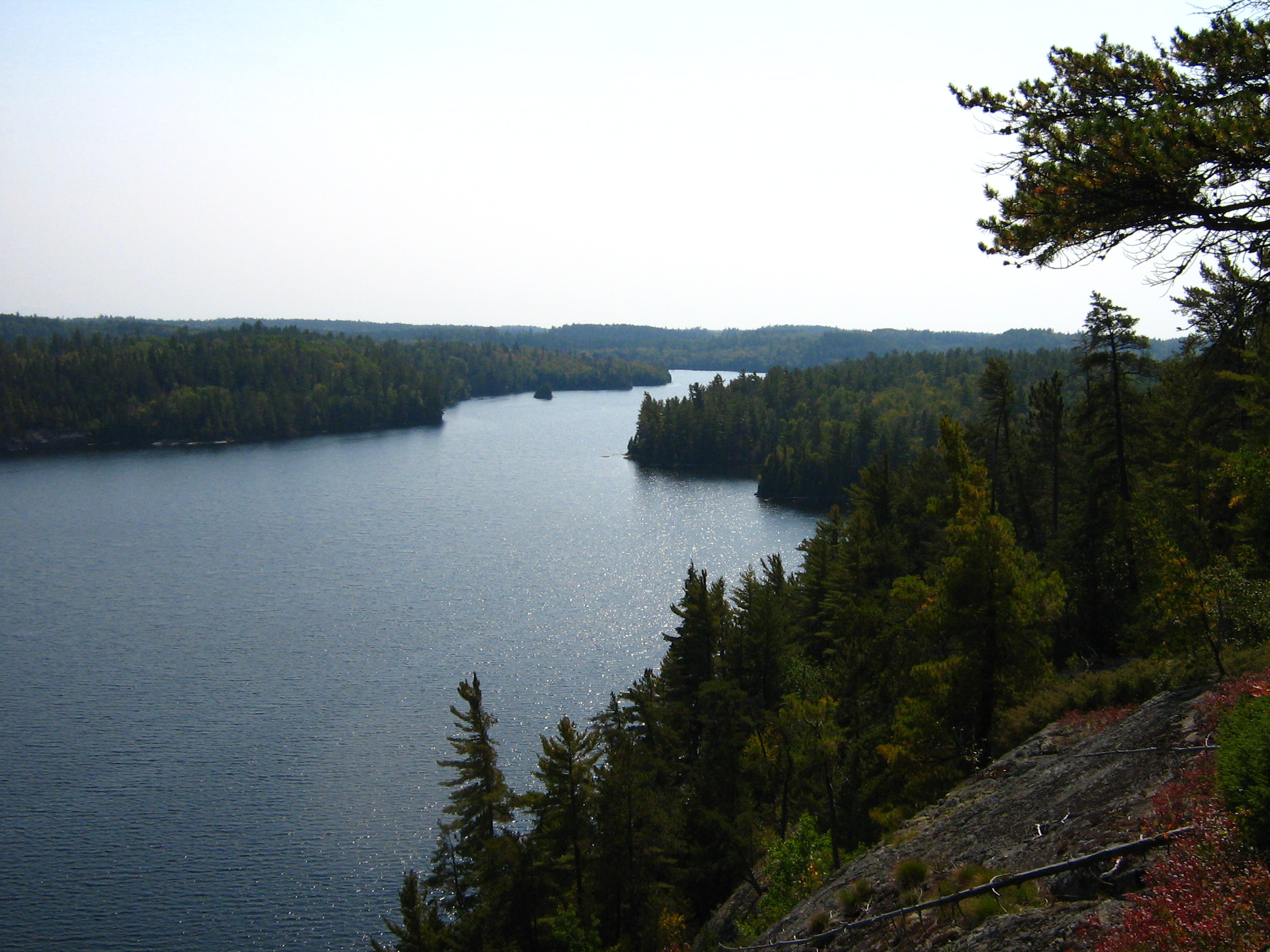
South arm of Rabbit Lake

Name	Township(s)	Coordinates	NTS map	Status	CGNDB id
Rabbit Lake	Askin, Riddell	46°59′23″N 79°38′50″W	031M/04	Official	FCJGO
Rankin Lake	Askin	46°53′50″N 79°42′21″W	031L/13	Official	FCJPE
Red Canoe Lake	Olive	46°49′52″N 79°48′4″W	031L/13	Official	FCKAY
Red Squirrel Lake	Aston, Banting, Cynthia	47°9′37″N 80°1′26″W	041P/01	Official	FCKIF
Redbark Lake	Belfast, Joan	46°59′45″N 80°9′55″W	041I/16	Official	FCKAN
Redflat Lake	Joan	47°2′23″N 80°3′10″W	041P/01	Official	FCKCG
Redmountain Lake	Cynthia, Joan	47°3′37″N 80°3′27″W	041P/01	Official	FCKEM
Reuben Lake	Askin, Riddell	46°57′14″N 79°41′43″W	031L/13	Official	FCKSQ
Reynard Lake	LeRoche	47°4′41″N 80°11′56″W	041P/01	Official	FCKTG
Rib Lake	Best	47°12′53″N 79°42′58″W	031M/04	Official	FCKUX
Robin Lake	Olive	46°51′5″N 79°48′4″W	031E/09	Official	FENPE
Roko Lake	Cynthia	47°7′12″N 80°2′52″W	041P/01	Official	FCLXS

=== S ===
Name	Township(s)	Coordinates	NTS map	Status	CGNDB id
Sauvé Lake	Cassels	47°7′8″N 79°40′45″W	031M/04	Official	FEAUL
Secret Lake	Joan	47°2′53″N 80°6′54″W	041P/01	Official	FDWUR
Side Rock Lake	Cynthia	47°4′35″N 80°3′34″W	041P/01	Official	FCODA
Skunk Lake	Phyllis, Scholes	46°55′19″N 80°9′39″W	041I/16	Official	FCOXV
Small Lake	Canton	47°11′20″N 80°16′27″W	041P/01	Official	FCPGJ
Snake Island Lake	Cassels, Riddell, Strathy	47°3′56″N 79°45′56″W	031M/04	Official	FCPQS
Snare Lake	Banting	47°13′16″N 79°55′6″W	031M/04	Official	FCPSK
Snowshoe Lake	Briggs	46°58′47″N 79°54′29″W	031L/13	Official	FCPVO
South Iron Lake	Vogt	46°49′26″N 80°3′8″W	041I/16	Official	FCQLJ
Spawning Lake	Briggs	47°1′43″N 79°58′51″W	031M/04	Official	FCQYL
Spitzig Lake	Briggs, Joan	47°1′33″N 80°0′47″W	041P/01	Official	FCREE
Spout Lake	Joan	47°2′30″N 80°3′39″W	041P/01	Official	FCRHY
Summit Lakes	Riddell, Strathcona	47°1′29″N 79°45′28″W	031M/04	Official	FCTVL
Sunrise Lake	Riddell	47°2′40″N 79°40′5″W	031M/04	Official	FCUAI
Sutton Lake	Chambers	47°3′58″N 79°57′16″W	031M/04	Official	FCUGA

=== T ===
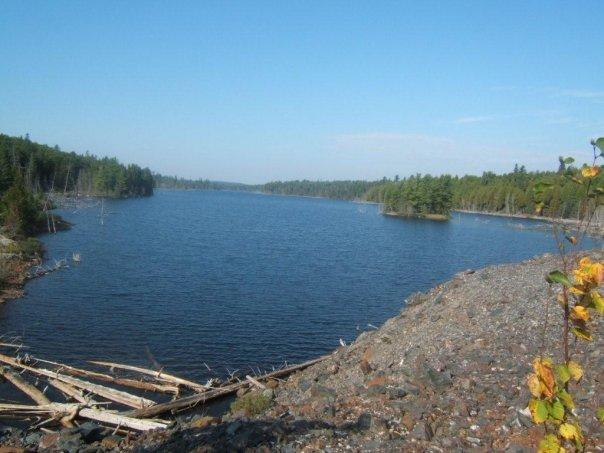
A view down the western portion of Tetapaga Lake

Name	Township(s)	Coordinates	NTS map	Status	CGNDB id
Tasse Lake	Chambers	47°5′17″N 79°58′21″W	031M/04	Official	FCUZN
Lake Temagami	Askin, Belfast, Briggs, Canton, Joan, LeRoche, Phyllis, Strathcona, Strathy, Torrington, Vogt, Yates	46°59′20″N 80°4′14″W	041P/01	Official	FCVJL
Tent Lake	Milne, Olive	46°51′46″N 79°45′2″W	031L/13	Official	FDHMG
Tetapaga Lake	Briggs	47°3′15″N 79°53′1″W	031M/04	Official	FCVOB
Thieving Bear Lake	Best	47°10′44″N 79°49′38″W	031M/04	Official	FCVSY
The Three Sisters	Best	47°12′37″N 79°47′38″W	031M/04	Official	FCWEV
Threeportage Lake	Askin	46°54′40″N 79°41′29″W	031L/13	Official	FCWDY
Turtle Lake	Strathcona, Strathy	47°3′35″N 79°50′7″W	031M/04	Official	FCYEJ
Twinsister Lake	Olive	46°52′14″N 79°49′55″W	031L/13	Official	FCYON
Tyndall Lake	Banting	47°11′3″N 79°56′16″W	031M/04	Official	FCYSF

=== U ===
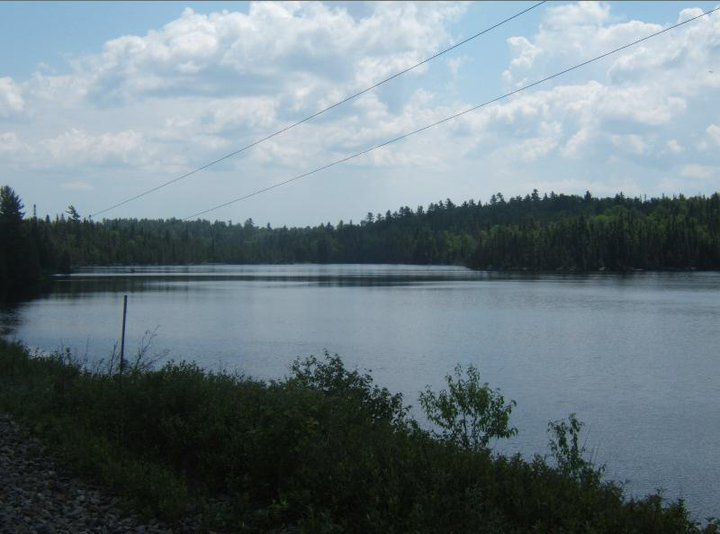
Upper Redwater Lake as seen from along the Ontario Northland Railway

Name	Township(s)	Coordinates	NTS map	Status	CGNDB id
Upper Bass Lake	Belfast	47°0′50″N 80°14′16″W	041P/01	Official	FCYYP
Upper Redwater Lake	Askin	46°53′56″N 79°39′44″W	031L/13	Official	FCZFE
Upper Twin Lake	Riddell, Strathcona	47°0′24″N 79°45′6″W	031M/04	Official	FCZHC

=== V ===
Name	Township	Coordinates	NTS map	Status	CGNDB id
Vermilion Lake	Strathy	47°5′0″N 79°51′0″W	031M/04	Rescinded	FCZTY

=== W ===
Name	Township(s)	Coordinates	NTS map	Status	CGNDB id
Wagkich Lake	Strathcona	47°1′41″N 79°46′9″W	031M/04	Official	FDAMY
Waha Lake	Law	46°55′15″N 79°47′56″W	031L/13	Official	FDANT
Warpats Lakes	Aston	47°10′37″N 80°3′22″W	041P/01	Official	FDBDK
Wasaksina Lake	Law, Yates	46°56′6″N 79°53′32″W	031L/13	Official	FDBFA
Watson's Lake	Best, Cassels	47°8′38″N 79°39′59″W	031M/04	Official	FDBMB
Whitewater Lake	Banting	47°13′57″N 80°0′3″W	041P/01	Official	FDDKI
Willis Lake	Yates	46°56′19″N 79°57′23″W	031L/13	Official	FDDYJ
Wilson Lake	Law	46°57′33″N 79°48′21″W	031L/13	Official	FDECH
Wolf Lake	Sisk	46°46′49″N 79°52′39″W	031L/13	Official	FDEUF

=== Z ===
Name	Township	Coordinates	NTS map	Status	CGNDB id
Zadow Lake	Sisk	46°43′15″N 79°50′39″W	031L/12	Official	FDFZL

== See also ==
- List of lakes of Ontario
