= Vermilion Lake (Temagami) =

Lake in Nipissing District, Ontario, Canada

- Location of Vermilion Lake in Ontario
- Location: Temagami, Nipissing, Ontario, Canada
- Coordinates: 47°5′N 79°51′W
- Part of: Great Lakes Basin
- Max. length: 3 km (1.9 mi)
- Max. width: 0.5 km (0.31 mi)
- Surface elevation: 300 m (980 ft)

Vermilion Lake, sometimes incorrectly spelled Vermillion Lake, was a natural lake located 5 km (3.1 mi) northwest of the village of Temagami in Nipissing District, Ontario, Canada. It occupied the southwestern corner of geographic Strathy Township until it was dewatered in 1967 to provide initial tailings storage for the then developing Sherman Mine.

== Hydrology ==
This northeast-southwest trending lake had a maximum width of about 500 m (1,600 ft), a length of around 3 km (1.9 mi) and an elevation of approximately 300 m (980 ft). There were at least two creek inflows, including one from neighbouring O'Connor Lake. The primary outflow was an unnamed creek from the south end of Vermilion Lake to Tetapaga Lake which eventually flows via the Tetapaga River, Lake Temagami, the Temagami River, the Sturgeon River, Lake Nipissing and the French River into Lake Huron.

== Geology ==
Vermilion Lake was situated at the south end of the Net Lake-Vermilion Lake Deformation Zone. This shear zone extends some 5 km (3.1 mi) to the northeast where it ends at Net Lake. The high frequency of gold occurrences in and adjacent to this zone has made it a high potential area for hosting major gold deposits. One of these gold occurrences, Oslund-Hurst, was located at the northeast end of Vermilion Lake. It was named after N. Oslund and F. Hurst who staked mining claims there prior to 1941.

The south end of Vermilion Lake was crosscut by banded iron formation of the Vermilion Range, which continued 2 km (1.2 mi) southwestwards to Iron Lake. A portion of this banded iron formation originally exposed on the southeastern shore of Vermilion Lake was mined in the North Pit of Sherman Mine.

== See also ==
- Lakes of Temagami
