= Spawning Lake Stock =

Geological formation in Ontario, Canada

The Spawning Lake Stock is an Archean age granitoid stock in Northeastern Ontario, Canada, located in Briggs Township and Chambers Township of Temagami. It intrudes through the Tetapaga Syncline, a major geologic fold in the Temagami Greenstone Belt. However, it remains undeformed by strain associated with the formation of the fold. The stock is intruded by dikes composed of biotite lamprophyre on its outer margins.

== See also ==
- Iceland Lake Pluton
- Chambers-Strathy Batholith
