= Temagami Greenstone Belt =

Geologic formation in Northeastern Ontario, Canada

- Stratigraphic range: Neoarchean
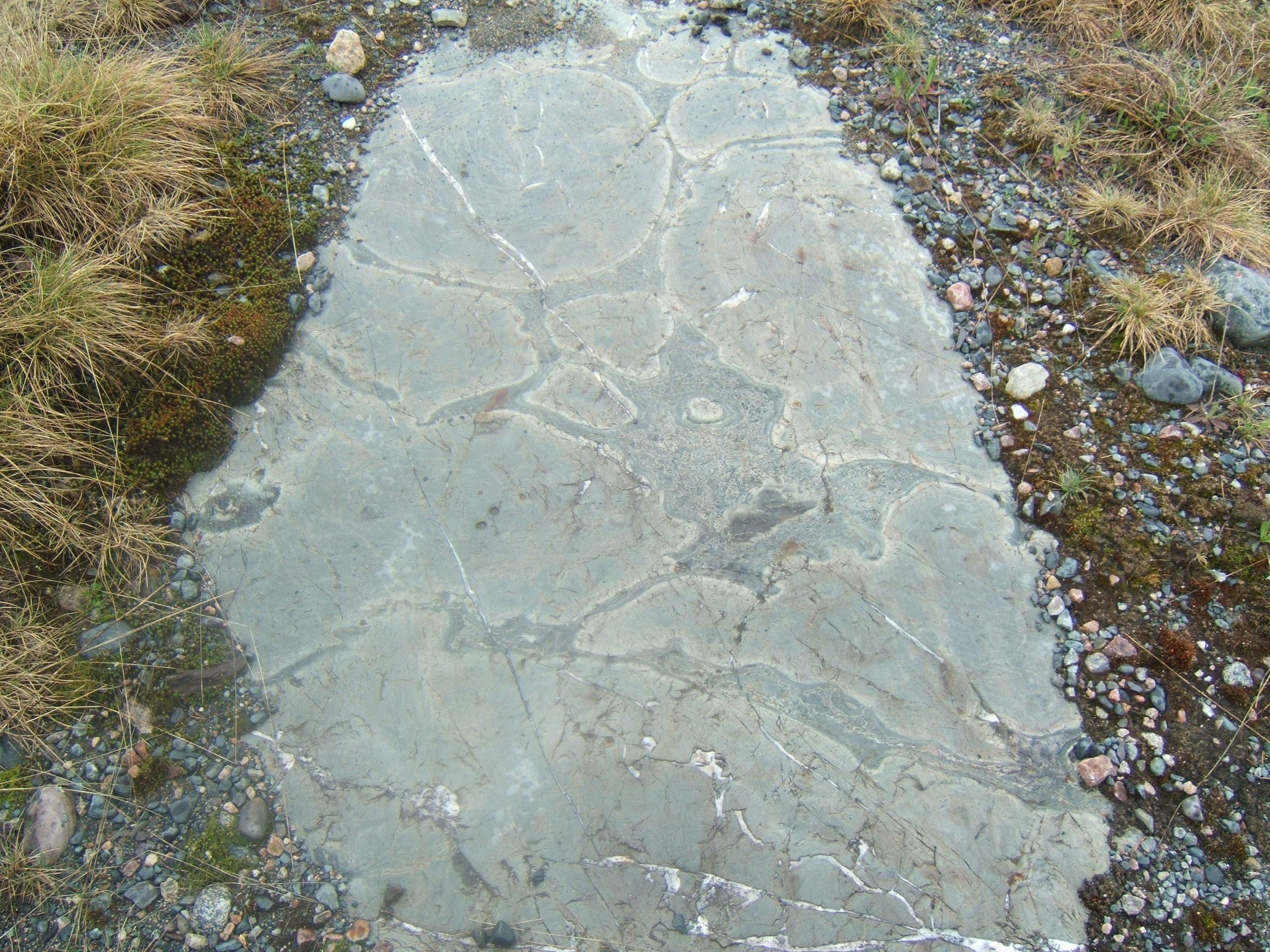
- Pillow lava (part of the Younger Volcanic Complex) exposed at Temagami's former garbage dump
- Type: Geological formation
- Unit of: Abitibi Subprovince
- Sub-units: Arsenic Lake Formation, Link Lake Formation, Turtle Lake Formation

Location
- Coordinates: 47°04′43.85″N 79°48′43.23″W
- Region: Ontario
- Country: Canada
- Extent: 32 by 25 km (20 by 16 mi)

Type section
- Named for: Temagami
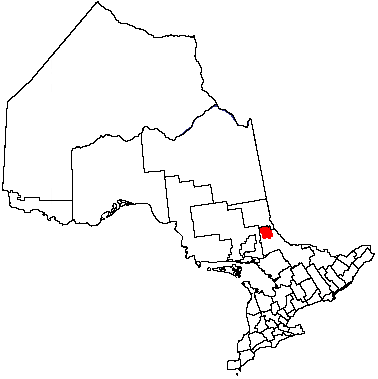
- Location of the Temagami Greenstone Belt in Ontario

The Temagami Greenstone Belt (TGB) is a small 2.7 billion year old greenstone belt in the Temagami region of Northeastern Ontario, Canada. It represents a feature of the Superior craton, an ancient and stable part of the Earth's lithosphere that forms the core of the North American continent and Canadian Shield. The belt is composed of metamorphosed volcanic rocks that range in composition from basalt to rhyolite. These form the east-northeast trend of the belt and are overlain by metamorphosed sedimentary rocks. They were created during several volcanic episodes involving a variety of eruptive styles ranging from passive lava eruptions to viscous explosive eruptions.

Part of the Canadian Shield, the TGB contains some of the oldest known rocks on Earth. The belt is made up of a number of geologic features such as batholiths, stocks, dikes, volcanic complexes, layered intrusions and deformation zones. These are situated in several geographical townships in the municipality of Temagami, including Chambers, Strathy, Strathcona, Briggs and possibly Best.

== Geology ==
Geologists assume that greenstone belts were formed by many geological processes, such as tectonism, magmatism, metamorphism and sedimentation. They are important economically for large metal deposits, and for the insight they provide into crustal evolution and the tectonics of the early Earth. The TGB is 25 km (16 mi) wide and 32 km (20 mi) long. It contains the southernmost remnants of Archean intrusive and supracrustal rocks in Eastern Ontario, as well as some of the most ancient felsic magmatic events in this section of the Superior craton. Uranium-lead dating has established that the Iceland Lake Pluton, as well as an adjacent rhyolitic lava flow, is about 2,736 million years old. Therefore, at least some intrusions were likely formed during the first volcanic phases in the belt and may have been conduits for volcanic eruptions.

The variety of volcanic deposits and intrusions in the TGB indicates that magmatic activity played a significant part in its formation. Pillow lava is found throughout the belt, indicating lava erupted underwater. Its pyroclastic deposits are remnants of explosive volcanism. The oldest exposed rocks within the belt are fine to medium-grained basalts and andesites. Lava flow units range in thickness from 90 m (300 ft) to 1,500 m (4,900 ft). Mafic agglomerate and breccia are relatively abundant, being either massive and undeformed, or sheared. Dacitic lava flows or tuffs overlie these metamorphosed volcanic rocks along with intermediate volcanic breccias, and are overlain by rhyolite lava flows and tuffs. Acidic lava flow units range in thickness from 90 m (300 ft) to 900 m (3,000 ft) and are common in the Vermilion Lake and Link Lake areas. The felsic tuffs are normally altered and sheared. The most recent intrusive activity in the TGB was the formation of a rhyolite porphyry dike 2687 ± 2 million years ago. This age correlates well with the 2675–2700 million year old intrusions throughout the Abitibi Subprovince, but the 2736 million year old magmatic events in the TGB are older than the closest exposed portion of the Abitibi Subprovince, about 120 km (75 mi) north of Kirkland Lake.

Along with nearby granitic intrusions, the TGB is bounded by layers of rock comprising the Huronian Supergroup. Strathy Township is dominated by metamorphosed volcanic rocks of the northeastern portion of the belt. It is approximately 24 km (15 mi) north of the Grenville Front Tectonic Zone. The volcanic rocks possibly total as much as 6,000 m (20,000 ft) thick. However, portions of the sequence might have been repeatedly sheared by one or several local fault zones. Every large volcanic event is capped by metamorphosed sedimentary rocks and/or iron formations. The metamorphosed sedimentary units range in thickness from 60 m (200 ft) to 300 m (980 ft) and consist of laminated slate and greywacke with or without volcanogenic tuffs. The iron formations are composed of alternate layers of magnetite, white quartzite, jasper, grey cherty quartz, and/or tremolite-chlorite tuff. They are intruded by sills composed of medium-grained, white-weathering, quartz diorite that range in thickness from 100 m (330 ft) to 210 m (690 ft). These rocks are similar to the coarse thicker parts of lava flows, but are interpreted to be partly intrusive, likely conduits that produced mafic volcanism.

=== Intrusions ===
A layered intrusion composed of diorite, pyroxenite, gabbro and anorthositic gabbro has been found in northwestern Strathy Township. Pyrrhotite is common in associated pyroclastic rock. Several northeast-trending shear zones less than 5 m (16 ft) wide intersect the edifice, extending along the Net Lake-Vermilion Lake Deformation Zone. This layered intrusion might be similar in age to the Kanichee layered intrusive complex, and may represent a magma chamber that was the source of tholeiitic volcanic activity.

The Kanichee layered intrusive complex, also known as the Kanichee Intrusion and Ajax Intrusion, is the most voluminous mafic-ultramafic body in metamorphosed felsic and mafic volcanic rocks of the northern TGB. It is an oval-shaped layered intrusion that was formed during five phases of magmatic activity. A series of south-southeast dipping cyclic magmatic layers make up the intrusion, similar to those of the surrounding metamorphosed volcanic rocks, indicating that the rocks of the intrusion were formed horizontally and likely close to the surface. Numerous magmatic events may have breached the surface to produce volcanic eruptions. The overall structure of the intrusion indicates it is cylindrical in shape and has a long axis plunging to the southeast at a somewhat steep angle. Its fairly steep angled axis was formed by at least one period of deformation that similarly folded and deformed the surrounding volcanic rocks.

An intrusion of light-coloured diorite lies at the northern end of the Tetapaga Syncline, along the Milne-Sherman Road. Its colouration is from weathering of plagioclase, which comprises more than 50% of the intrusive rock. Several east-trending high-strain zones related to the Link Lake Deformation Zone, less than 1 m (3.3 ft) wide, are found in the intrusion, indicating that it formed at least before the last increment of strain along the Link Lake Deformation Zone. The dioritic intrusion might be the remains of a magma chamber that was the product of calc-alkaline feldspar-phyric felsic volcanism, the erupted products of which are mostly located in the Sherman Mine area.

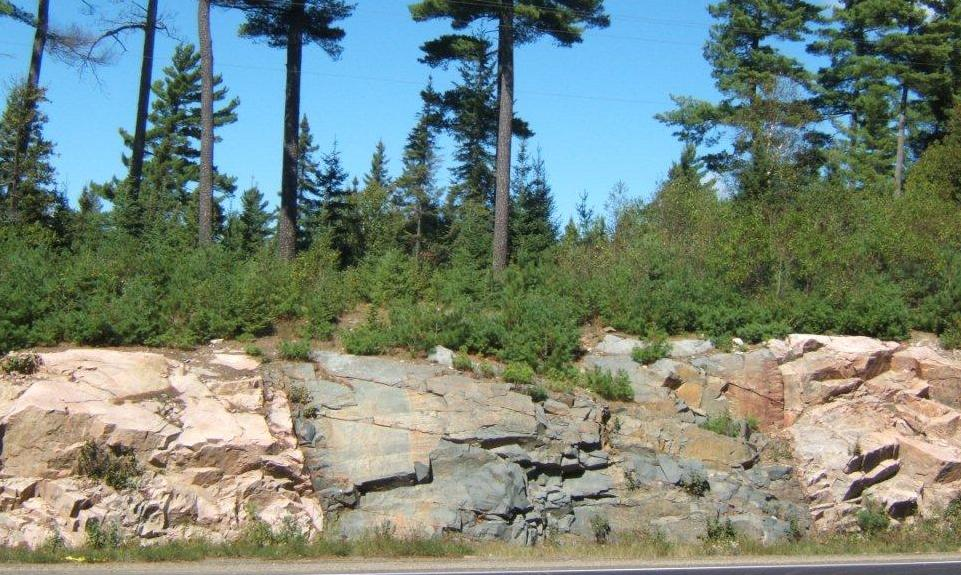
A dike intruding igneous rock exposed along Highway 11 immediately north of Temagami North. This dike is about 2 m (6.6 ft) wide

At least three large granitoid intrusions penetrate the TGB. The Spawning Lake Stock in Briggs and Chambers townships contains megacrysts that reach 2 cm (0.79 in) to 3 cm (1.2 in) in diameter. It shears through the nearby fold axis of the Tetapaga Syncline, but remains undeformed by the western expression of the Net Lake-Vermilion Lake Deformation Zone. To the north and northeast, the massive Chambers-Strathy Batholith was formed during one magmatic event. It consists of intrusive rocks ranging from pink to grey quartz monzonite to granodiorite and intrudes metamorphosed volcanic rocks of the TGB. The Iceland Lake Pluton, situated in Strathcona and Briggs townships, consists of a complex series of chlorite trondhjemite, hornblende quartz diorite and hornblende trondhjemite magmas that were emplaced during more than one magmatic event. The trend of metamorphosed volcanic rocks in Briggs and Strathcona townships is parallel to the intrusion contact. A planar fabric, attributed to the earliest deformation of the TGB, exists in the outer margin of the intrusion.

Intrusive dikes composed of quartz and feldspar-quartz porphyry are widespread in Strathy Township. All dike types were placed in the Earth's crust during the formation of the TGB. At least some of these dikes may have been subvolcanic feeders that produced known calc-alkalic felsic volcanic events in the belt. Many pyroxenite dikes less than 2 m (6.6 ft) wide intrude every geologic formation in the township. A pyroxenite dike east of Highway 11 extends roughly to the north-northwest while two others, north of Arsenic Lake, extend to the east. This includes a dike exposed along the Kanichee Mine Road in Temagami North, where it intrudes the large granitic Chambers-Strathy Batholith. A series of northwest-trending dikes composed of diabase may represent extensions of the 1,250 million year old Sudbury dike swarm. This dike swarm is older than the Lake Wanapitei impact crater but younger than the meteorite impact that created the large Sudbury Basin crater about 1,850 million years ago. Therefore, the TGB predates these two impact craters, the Sudbury crater of which is the seconed largest known impact crater on Earth.

=== Felsic volcanic vents ===
Volcanic vents composed of felsic rocks are thought to have been located at the iron-bearing Sherman Mine, the former Temagami garbage dump and adjacent to the Milne Townsite. Remnants of a large volcanic vent are present west of Sherman Mine, including the existence of two felsic lava flows that outcrop between Link Lake and Turtle Lake. The aspect of the most extensive felsic lava flow indicates that the volcanic vent they erupted from was adjacent to the western portion of Link Lake. Additionally, differentiation of facies and directions in which the lava traveled exist in course grained, resedimented conglomerate. This suggests that a more prominent structure, perhaps evidence of a prehistoric volcano, existed west of Link Lake. Also, coarsest felsic volcanic fragments occur in feldspar-phyric pyroclastic deposits exposed on the Sherman Mine property, suggesting the approximate location of a volcanic vent.

Just north of the Milne Townsite lies a minor felsic volcanic vent exposed along the Milne-Sherman Road. A quartz porphyry has intruded mafic and rhyolitic lava flows and a dike of diorite. In the middle of the intrusive body, the grain size of quartz phenocrysts averages roughly 3 mm (0.12 in), but become smaller towards the edge of the intrusion. Broken fragmental rocks, interpreted to be carapace breccia, are exposed along the western margin of the intrusion. Exposed near a minor felsic lava dome is a fine grained, quartz-phyric felsic rock that may represent a rhyolite lava flow. An igneous body, interpreted to be a subvolcanic intrusion, is exposed approximately 1 km (0.62 mi) to the northwest and might have formed during the same magmatic event as the felsic dome. Exposed along the Sherman Mine railroad west of the former Milne sawmill lumber yard is a porphyritic body composed of quartz-feldspar. It is unknown if this igneous rock is a rhyolitic lava flow or an intrusion.

Several north-trending felsic dikes, composed mainly of feldspar and quartz-feldspar, are located north of the former Temagami garbage dump. These dikes are not known to extend across the Link Lake Deformation Zone, suggesting that they might represent the feeders of a minor volcanic vent, manifest now by felsic lava flows. Because certain lithologies can be correlated through the Link Lake Deformation Zone, it is unlikely that the lack of felsic dikes south of the former town dump area is an expression of displacement along the deformation zone.

=== Volcanic complexes ===
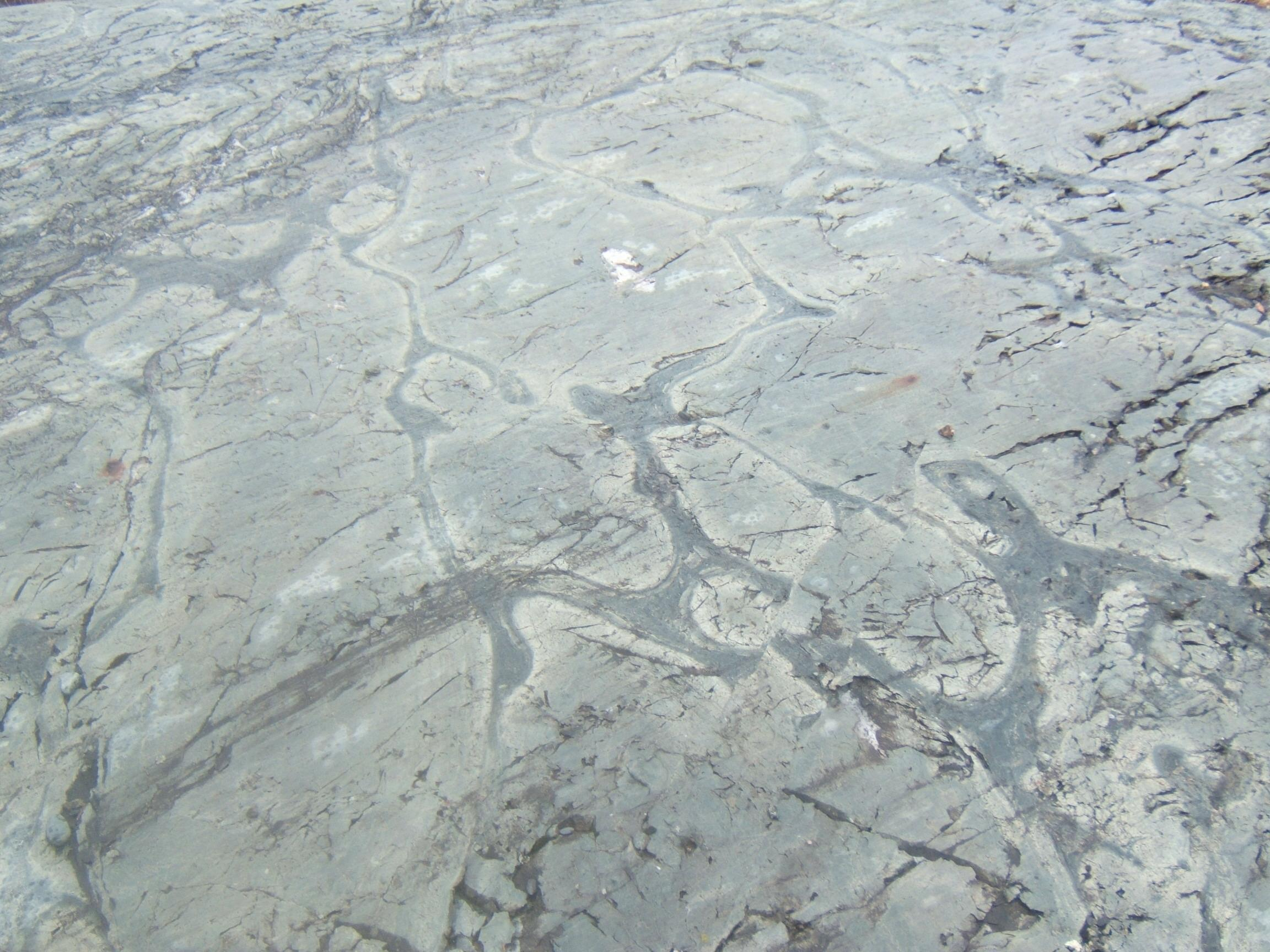
Surface of a weathered pillow lava formation west of the Ontario Northland Railway. This is one of the several pillow lava outcrops throughout the Temagami Greenstone Belt

The TGB consists of two large volcanic sequences that were formed during several phases of volcanic activity. These two sequences, known as the Older and Younger volcanic complexes, consist of volcanic rocks ranging in composition from felsic to mafic. The Older Volcanic Complex is composed mainly of felsic lava flows and pyroclastic deposits with smaller amounts of mafic volcanic rocks. It underlies a large portion of northwestern Strathy Township and is penetrated by mafic intrusions, although the Kanichee Intrusion consists of peridotite and pyroxenite, which are ultramafic rocks. Just to the southeast, the Younger Volcanic Complex consists mainly of mafic volcanic rocks that form four geologic formations. The Arsenic Lake Formation is composed of dark green, iron-rich, massive and pillowed tholeiitic basalts. Throughout the Arsenic Lake Formation are feldspar-phyric basaltic lava flows. This type of basalt contains tabular feldspar phenocrysts that range up to 2 cm (0.79 in) in cross section. Both pillowed and massive lava flows have been known to contain coarse feldspar. Coarse feldspar-bearing, iron tholeiitic basalts are more common east of Highway 11.

A number of volcanic rocks comprise the Link Lake Formation, such as feldspar-phyric, calc-alkaline basalt and andesite lava flows and less abundant quartz and quartz-feldspar-phyric felsic lava flows. Feldspar-phyric basalt lava flows are normally pillowed. Pyroclastic deposits, quartz-phyric and feldspar-felsic rocks are also present. The largest of the less common felsic lava flows is located between Link Lake and Turtle Lake. It is 2.5 km (1.6 mi) long and less than 200 m (660 ft) thick. The thickest portion of this lava flow or dome is located at the western end of Link Lake, where it is likely associated with a volcanic vent. The bulk of felsic rock in the Link Lake Formation occurs as subaqueous pyroclastic flow deposits. Subaerial pyroclastics are normally quartz-phyric and range up to 30 cm (12 in) in crosssection. Dark green subaerial pyroclastics composed of chlorite and sericite are uncommon and have sustained preferential compression in response to shear throughout the Link Lake Deformation Zone. These dark compressed pyroclastics have been interpreted to be pumice. Some of the subsequence pyroclastic deposits contain fragments of pyrite and quartz, suggesting that discharged sulfide hydrothermal activity took place throughout the volcanic source area.

Resedimented felsic, epiclastic and turbiditic sediments compose the Turtle Lake Formation. The base of this formation consists of a heterolithic, volcaniclastic, matrix-supported conglomerate unit that overlies felsic lava flows and pillowed, calc-alkaline basalts of the Link Lake Formation. Many rounded to subangular felsic and mafic volcanic fragments are known to occur in the unit, as well as rare quartz vein fragments and one fragment of white chert. The conglomerate unit passes laterally and vertically into thin bedded deposits. These thin bedded deposits are interpreted to be turbidites that originated from a felsic volcanic vent at the western end of Link Lake. Many dark green, highly vesicular, iron-rich tholeiitic basalts occur in the Turtle Lake Formation, and are interbedded with thin-bedded wackes on the southern limb of the Tetapaga Syncline. The basalts are best exposed along the south shore of Turtle Lake. In some cases, the basalt vesicles are over 1 cm (0.39 in) in diameter and are now filled by white quartz.

A series of dark green, massive and pillowed iron-rich tholeiitic basalt lava flows compose an unnamed upper volcanic formation of the Younger Volcanic Complex. It is situated in the core of the Tetapaga Syncline. Not much is known about this volcanic formation because only a small portion of it remains exposed in western Strathy Township.

=== Deformation zones ===
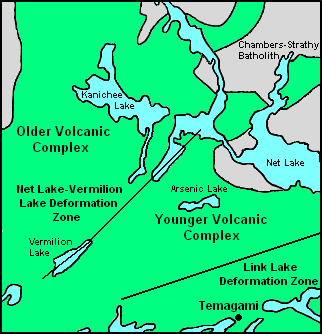
Lakes, volcanic complexes and deformation zones of Strathy Township. Also shown are portions of the massive Chambers-Strathy Batholith

Many north-trending shear zones intersect iron-rich tholeiitic basalts of the Arsenic Lake Formation. These zones range in width from less than 1 m (3.3 ft) up to 5 m (16 ft), and might maintain a larger area of weakness that was tectonically active over the past billion years. Evidence for early tectonism, likely related to volcanic activity, include the greater density of felsic dikes concentrated immediately around these zones. An example is the north–south trending Big Dan Shear Zone situated near the former garbage dump of Temagami. The felsic dikes near this zone are interpreted to represent a subvolcanic feeder system to the overlying felsic volcanic rocks. It is probable that the dikes maintained a former zone of weakness now demonstrated by the shear zones. Renewed tectonic activity along the Big Dan Shear Zone is manifested by offset of clastic sediments east of the Ontario Northland Railway. This phase of tectonic activity displaced felsic dikes north of the exposed part of this shear zone. However, considerable displacement of the dikes at this location is unknown. The most recent phase of tectonic activity along the Big Dan Shear Zone resulted in the displacement of a Proterozoic dike composed of diabase, which intersects the zone. A similar abundance of felsic dikes are adjacent to Arsenic Lake just west of Highway 11, indicating similar repetitive tectonism also occurred along that structural zone. Therefore, the north-trending shear zones may have been active for at least a billion years.

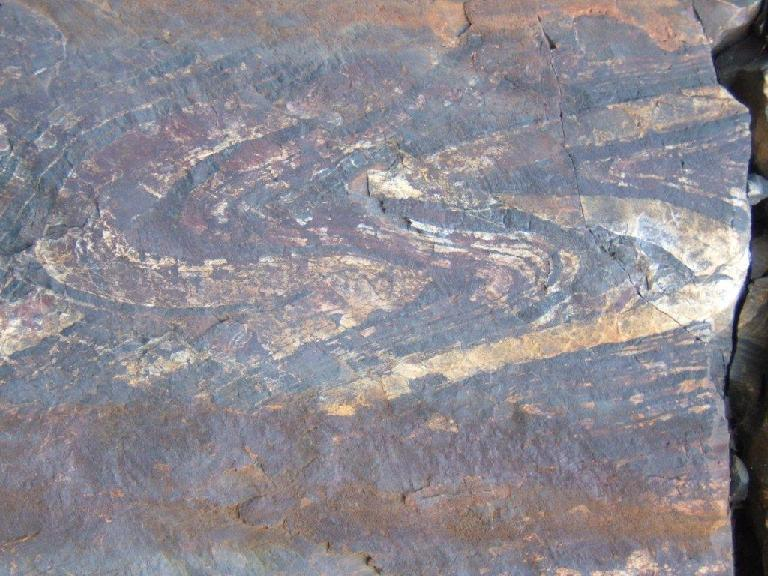
An S-shaped fold in banded iron formation exposed along Highway 11 just north of the town of Temagami

Extending from Net Lake to Vermilion Lake lies a northeast–southwest trending high strain zone known as the Net Lake-Vermilion Lake Deformation Zone. Because geologic mapping has not been done comprehensively throughout this zone, its exact width is unknown. The expression of this deformation zone is clearly identifiable by the intense change in volcanic rocks of the TGB. Volcanic units comprising the northwestern portion of the shear zone have shifted to the northeast while the volcanic rocks comprising its southeastern portion have shifted to the southwest. Along the northeastern arm of Lake Temagami in Strathcona Township lies the Northeast Arm Deformation Zone. This northeast-trending shear zone has not been studied in detail, but casual studies of many islands along the northeastern arm of Lake Temagami have shown that there is severe foliation and minor ferroan carbonate across an area about 1 km (0.62 mi) wide. The Link Lake Deformation Zone, also known as the Link Lake Shear Zone, is an area of deformation 0.5 km (0.31 mi) wide and over 3 km (1.9 mi) long in Strathy Township. It extends through Link Lake to east of Highway 11, but it is uncertain whether it extends west of Link Lake because no expression of it has been found in the Sherman Mine area. Therefore, the Link Lake Shear Zone might be a northern extension of the Northeast Arm Deformation Zone further south. Strain intensity of the Link Lake Shear Zone is diverse. Generally, the greatest strain intensity is throughout pyroclastic rocks. Extending from the western boundary of central Chambers Township through Tasse Lake to the east is the Tasse Lake Deformation Zone. This deformation zone is roughly 3 km (1.9 mi) long and at least 0.5 km (0.31 mi) wide. It is uncertain if this deformation zone extends east of Tasse Lake.

=== Rock alteration ===
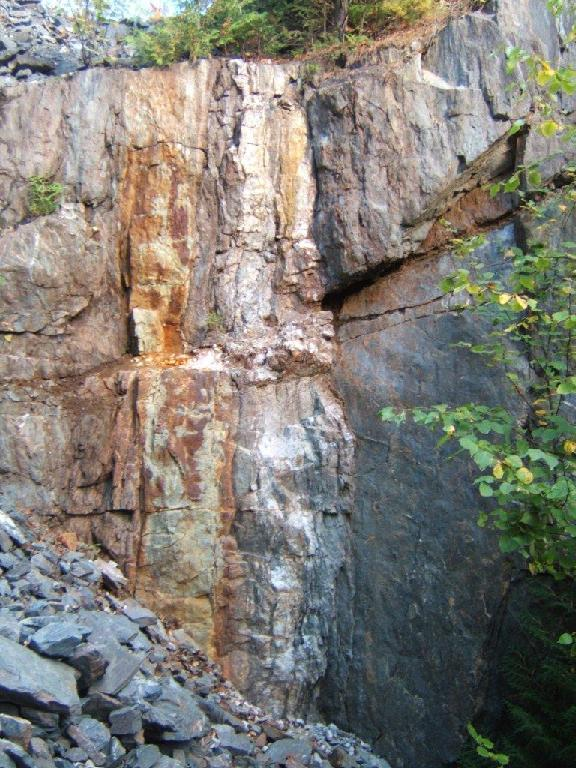
A vertical quartz vein exposed in a trench at Beanland Mine. This vein is about 0.31 m (1.0 ft) wide

Many forms of rock alteration can be seen in the TGB. Its overall structure has attained greenschist grade metamorphism, even though amphibolite grade metamorphism surrounds the Chambers-Strathy Batholith. The metamorphism that creates greenschist is minimal in contrast to that which creates rocks such as gneiss. Other rock alterations include small veins of quartz and epidote, vesicles filled with quartz, calcite and chlorite, extensive replacement of volcanic rock by silica or calcite, and calcite precipitation in extension fractures.

Outcrops of silicified mafic pillow lava are found along and west of the Ontario Northland Railway, east of the Big Dan Shear Zone and adjacent to Outlet Bay and Boot Bay of Net Lake. This form of alteration occurs in deformation zones and is the product of low temperature seawater alteration. Volcanic rock replaced by carbonate is commonly found in the Northeast Arm Deformation Zone, the Link Lake Shear Zone and in the Net Lake-Vermilion Lake Deformation Zone. Within the high strain zones, carbonate is also manifest as 1 m (3.3 ft) wide veins that have been traced along strike for more than 100 m (330 ft).

Basalt has been replaced by calcite in a restricted area just north of the Temagami's former garbage dump. Although developed adjacent to the Link Lake Shear Zone, rocks within and just outside the calcite alteration zone do not normally contain significant foliation. Thus, if the calcite alteration zone was located within the Link Lake Shear Zone, it did not form inside the zone of the highest strain.

=== Mineralization ===
The TGB contains massive banded iron formations and several precious metal and base metal deposits. The banded iron formations range from 1 m (3.3 ft) to 2 m (6.6 ft) to more than 150 m (490 ft) thick. Remnants of volcanic vents are an important locator for mineral potential in the Temagami belt because they are adjacent to rocks that contain certain types of mineralization. At the Link Lake Formation, good evidence for copper-zinc massive sulfide deposits has been discovered in associated volcanic rocks. Some gold mineralization may also be associated with volcanic vents. Studies of greenstone terranes in the Superior craton have shown that large gold deposits are associated with regional deformation zones. Therefore, the Northeast Arm Deformation Zone, the Link Lake Shear Zone and the Net Lake-Vermilion Lake Deformation Zone are obvious high potential areas. A number of scattered pyrite deposits can be found throughout the Northeast Arm Deformation Zone. The high frequency of gold mineralization in and near the Net Lake-Vermilion Lake Deformation Zone suggests that this deformation zone may very well also contain gold deposits; at least 11 have been discovered within a 4 km (2.5 mi) length of the deformation zone. The gold deposits are found in many rock types, indicating a stronger gold-bearing system with the potential of larger gold deposits. A number of gold-pyrite deposits exist in felsic volcanic rocks overlying the Older Volcanic Complex, near and on the northwestern part of the Net Lake-Vermilion Lake Deformation Zone. These deposits were likely formed during the creation of the Net Lake-Vermilion Lake Deformation Zone. At the Younger Volcanic Complex, gold exists in quartz veins containing base metal sulfides. It is also known to exist in pyrite associated with deformed magnetite-rich iron formations, sericitized and carbonatized felsic volcanic rock, quartz-pyrrhotite-chalcopyrite-pentlandite-pyrite zones within deformation zones and in north-trending, chloritized shear zones containing arsenopyrite, pyrrhotite, pyrite and chalcopyrite.

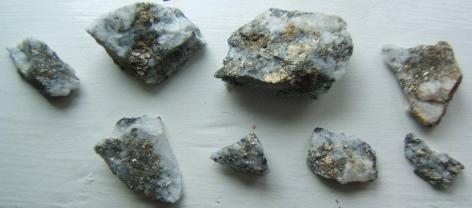
Samples of pyrite in quartz obtained from a 0.31 m (1.0 ft) wide quartz vein at Beanland Mine

A variety of iron, copper, arsenic and zinc ores such as arsenopyrite, pyrrhotite, pyrite and chalcopyrite with sphalerite, are present as small veins and in quartz veins throughout north-trending shear zones that cut the iron-rich tholeiitic basalts of the Arsenic Lake Formation. Dikes composed of quartz-feldspar porphyry run parallel to or lie within the shear zones and are cut by the mineralization. Chalcopyrite occupies later fractures which intersect massive arsenopyrite. Sparse quartz veins normally exist in or adjacent to the arsenopyrite-rich zones. Several northeast-trending deformation zones intersect pyroxenite of a mafic sill in northwest Strathy Township. Within these high-strain zones quartz veins normally contain chalcopyrite, pyrite, pyrrhotite with exsolved pentlandite and traces of sphalerite and galena. Chalcopyrite, pyrrhotite and pentlandite are deposited throughout shear zones which lack quartz veining. These zones are not known to contain large amounts of gold, although investigations are incomplete. It is also unknown if platinum group metals (which include platinum, palladium, rhodium, iridium, osmium and ruthenium) exist in these zones because no searches for platinum group elements have been undertaken.

Gold and copper values occupy a northeast-trending iron formation within the Net Lake-Vermilion Lake Deformation Zone. This mineralization is only known to exist southeast of Cooke Lake and immediately south of Net Lake. A unit of chert, magnetite and pyrrhotite outcrops along the southwest shore of Net Lake at Temagami North. Pyrrhotite, the most common sulfide mineral, occurs as small veins and disseminations. Small amounts of pyrite, sphalerite and exsolved pentlandite and chalcopyrite are present with the pyrrhotite. The main exposure lies immediately south of the Kanichee Mine Road, which branches off Highway 11. Minor gold and copper values constitute this zone. This sulfide-bearing unit is located within felsic volcanic rocks of the Older Volcanic Complex and is capped by large, dark green, iron-rich tholeiitic basalts of the Arsenic Lake Formation. It has been interpreted that the sulfide zone represents a volcanogenic massive sulfide ore deposit based on the structure of the sulfide zone and the associated rock types. These ore deposits are created by volcanic-associated hydrothermal events in submarine environments. However, there is evidence that the sulfide mineralization does not have a volcanogenic origin. An unusual feature of this sulfide deposit is the large degree of magnetite at the actual showing. Studies have shown that the chert-magnetite iron formations in the West and North Pits of Sherman Mine extend under and along a series of small lakes from Vermilion Lake to Net Lake. These iron formations are located at roughly the same stratigraphic position as the magnetite-bearing iron formation on the southwestern shore of Net Lake. A northwest-trending cross fault is accompanied by drag folding of a chert-magnetite iron formation unit southeast of Cooke Lake. Also exposed in this area is a dark yellow 40 cm (16 in) wide quartz vein composed of pyrite that cross cuts the iron formation at the northeastern end. This west-northwest trending quartz vein is about 60 m (200 ft) long.

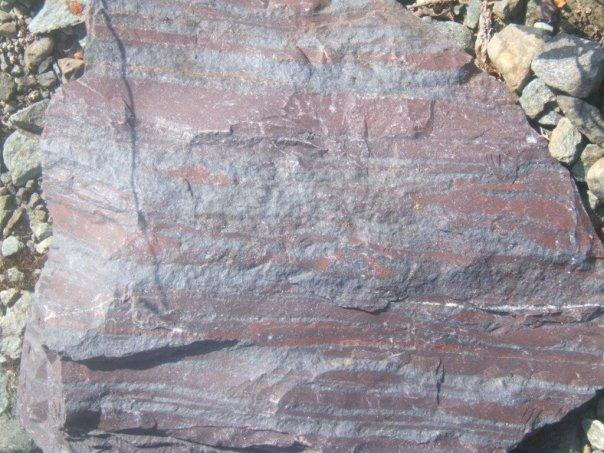
Banded iron formation in the North Pit area of Sherman Mine, showing the red lateral lines of jasper and grey lateral lines of magnetite typical of Neoarchean (2,800–2,500 million year old) banded iron formations

Layered chert-magnetite and lesser chert-pyrite-pyrrhotite iron formations are located at the base of the Arsenic Lake Formation. Former drilling near Vermilion Lake and spatial relationships observed on the surface, suggest that the sulfide-rich iron formation lies up to 10 m (33 ft) stratigraphically under the oxide facies iron formation. Iron production from the West and North Pits of Sherman Mine came from this chert-magnetite iron formation unit while chert-magnetite iron formations at the South and East Pits compose the Turtle Lake Formation. The South and East Pit iron formations reach thicknesses of 30 m (98 ft) and overlie a thinly bedded turbidite package on the southern limb of the Tetapaga Syncline.

A white palladium mercury telluride mineral known as temagamite was discovered in 1973 on Temagami Island in Lake Temagami. It is present as microscopic inclusions within chalcopyrite in association with other rare tellurides, such as merenskyite, stuetzite and hessite. Also discovered on the island was an unnamed palladium mercury silver telluride mineral, the composition and optical properties of which are significantly different from those of temagamite.

=== Paleogeology ===
The TGB, at 2.7 billion years old, dates back to the formation of the supercontinent Kenorland between 2.8 and 2.6 billion years ago. This large landmass consisted of the Baltic and Siberian shields of Eurasia and Archean provinces of North America, including the Superior craton of which the Temagami belt occupies a part. Rifting of Kenorland began 2.45 billion years ago in Ontario with the formation of several large igneous provinces. Initial rifting is represented by basal mafic volcanic rocks in the nearby Huronian Supergroup. Final breakup formed a large group of mafic dike and sill swarms in the North American provinces 2.2–2.1 billion years ago. By the Paleoproterozoic era Kenorland had already rifted apart, and the TGB formed a small part of the supercontinent Columbia starting 1.9–1.8 billion years ago. Eastern India, Australia, Laurentia, Baltica, North China, the Amazon shield and portions of Antarctica formed the landmass until it ruptured 1.5–1.4 billion years ago. In the late Mesoproterozoic era 1.1 billion years ago, the Temagami belt was part of another supercontinent. This former supercontinent, known as Rodinia, included Oaxaquia, Rockall, Laurentia, Baltica, Australia, West Africa, South China, Amazonia, Mawson and Río de la Plata cratons, as well as the Pampean terrane. Laurentia, which included the Superior craton and the TGB, is interpreted to have formed the core of Rodinia because it is surrounded by passive margins formed during the breakup of the supercontinent some 750 million years ago.

After Rodinia broke apart, its southern half traveled south and crossed the South Pole while its northern half traveled northward to the North Pole. The two halves of Rodinia eventually collided with the Congo craton to form the supercontinent Pannotia 600 million years ago. In contrast to Rodinia, Pannotia was short-lived. It rifted apart 545 million years ago, or only 65 million years after it formed. This resulted in the creation of at least four continents, namely Baltica, Siberia, Gondwana and Laurentia. By the Early Cambrian 514 million years ago, Laurenta was located on the equator, Baltica was south of Laurenta, Siberia was just south of the equator east of Laurenta, and Gondwana lay mostly in the Southern Hemisphere. Subsequently, Baltica, Laurenta and microcontinent Avalonia collided in the Devonian period (416-359 million years ago) to form the continent Euramerica. This eventually started to collide with Gondwana and other landmasses to form supercontinent Pangaea 255 million years ago. In the Late Triassic period some 152 million years ago, Pangaea split into two large continents, namely Gondwana and Laurasia. The TGB represented a minor portion of western Laurasia until it divided into Eurasia and North America about 94 million years ago. Since the Middle Miocene 14 million years ago, the TGB has been part of the Americas, a north–south trending landmass comprising the continents of North America and South America.

== Human history ==
=== Naming ===
The name "Temagami" is Ojibwe in origin, meaning "deep clear water"; until 1968 it was spelt as "Timagami". This spelling of the name appeared on all official maps and related documents when it was adopted on June 25, 1906. In early 1968 the Canada Post Office applied to the Geographical Names Board of Canada for a spelling reform to Temagami at the instigation of the general public. The Executive Secretary of this committee subsequently applied to the Lands and Surveys Branch of the Ontario Department of Lands and Forests. This former department, now part of Ministry of Natural Resources, corresponded with the proposed renaming of Timagami on March 20, 1968, as well as for Lake Timagami, Timagami Island and the Timagami River. Further improvements occurred when the Geographical Names Board of Canada agreed to change the name spelling to Temagami on March 27, 1968. Nevertheless, the original spelling (Timagami) has appeared in documents published after the renaming, including Kent C. Condie's 1981 book Archean Greenstone Belts.

=== Mineral explorations ===
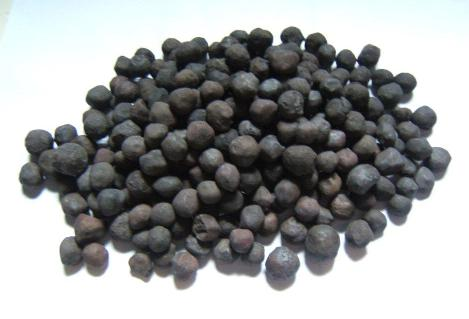
Iron ore pellets collected from the Sherman Mine railroad. Sherman Mine was the last mine to operate in the Temagami Greenstone Belt

In May 1995 Pacific Mariner Exploration carried out a small drilling program on its properties in Strathy Township to estimate the likelihood of base metal deposits. A 215 m (705 ft) hole was drilled under Net Lake in Temagami North, but its collapse prevented the survey's completion. As a result, little is known about its geophysical features. Most of the property was influenced by Net Lake and included ten adjacent mining claims.

At least five explorations took place in the Strathy Township property before 1995. In 1934 Strathy Basin and Erie Canadian Mines conducted prospected sections of the 1995 claim block. A 21.2 m (70 ft) wide rusted zone within a dike was announced as containing values of $7.50 combined gold, copper and nickel. Little work has been completed in this area. In 1959 and 1960, Goldfields Mining conducted a basic airborne electromagnetic survey and magnetic survey over the property. Several holes were drilled and intersected mostly mafic to intermediate volcanic rocks and areas of stringer sulfides with pyrrhotite, pyrite and some chalcopyrite. No assays were reported. In 1970 E. L. McVeigh occupied a section of the property, including the area that was once owned by Strathy Basin Mines. McVeigh conducted geophysical surveys over Strathy Basin's mineralized zone and announced no conductors. From 1974 to 1975 Vale Limited owned an extensive section of the Strathy Township property. They conducted magnetic and electromagnetic surveys, as well as mapping and drilling. Vale announced that they intersected mineralized sulfide zones ranging from 3.1 m (10 ft) to 45.6 m (150 ft) thick.

In 1952 Rib Lake Copper Mines explored areas adjacent to Whitney Lake and between Whitney Lake and Rib Lake, by creating trenches and carrying out diamond drilling. Nickel was discovered with widespread pyrrhotite in sheared mafic rocks. Gold mineralization was discovered with pyrite in slightly siliceous tuff. The highest assessment was 1.30 oz (37 g) of gold per ton and 0.99% of nickel over 1.8 m (5.9 ft), both from the same zone. Detailed work did not occur in the Rib Lake area of southern Gillies Limit Township and northern Best Township until 1968, when mapping took place, but it is unclear whether volcanic rocks in the Rib Lake area are part of the TGB, as they have not been mapped in any detail. With the existence of Early Archean age tholeiitic and/or calc-alkaline mafic to intermediate volcanic rocks, they may represent a minor continuation of the belt, which is located about 6 km (3.7 mi) to the southwest. Small intrusions and pyroclastics of mafic composition are also present in the area. In 1956 Silanco carried out geophysics south of Whitney Lake. In 1964 Nickel Rim Mines Ltd. had a greatest result of 1.30 oz (37 g) of gold per ton. The exploration and mining activity south of Gillies Limit Township observed nickel, copper and platinum group metals at Cuniptau Mine and gold, silver and copper at the Big Dan and Little Dan mines.

=== Mining ===
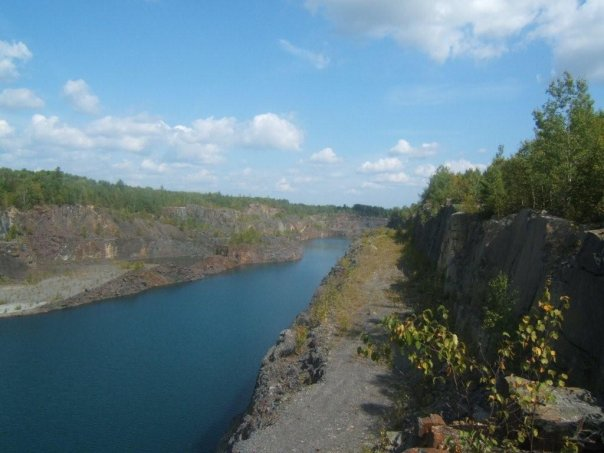
East Pit of Sherman Mine. This image was taken from a cliff in the middle of the pit

Because of the high mineralization, several mines have opened in the belt. Sherman Mine, northwest of the town of Temagami, was a major producer of iron ore. Mining operations began in 1968, and workings consisted of seven open pits: North Pit, East Pit, South Pit, West Pit and three relatively small open pits known as the Turtle Pits. A railroad was built from the Ontario Northland Railway to Sherman Mine in the 1960s to make transportation and shipping of iron ore easier and faster across Ontario. To the north, Temagami North was constructed as a resource town in the 1960s to supply Sherman Mine. With an average overall grade of 25% iron, the mine produced approximately 10,700 tons of crude ore per day and its mill capacity was 1,000,000 long tons (1.0×10^{9} kg) of iron ore pellets per year. Operations at Sherman Mine ceased in 1990 after its owner Dofasco announced that they would be closing the mine. The municipality of Temagami made several approaches to Dofasco before the closer of Sherman Mine, offering a partnership in the community's future in terms of shared funding for a Sherman Park. However, it was informed during discussions with Dofasco's media executives that in the future they could not be counted on for maintenance funds for parks or anything else that was being done in partnership with the community. This caused a large attitudinal change from a few months earlier when the mine was associated with much of Temagami. The closure also had a significant impact on the economy of Temagami. There is still iron ore at Sherman Mine, but Dofasco were able to obtain it more cheaply elsewhere.

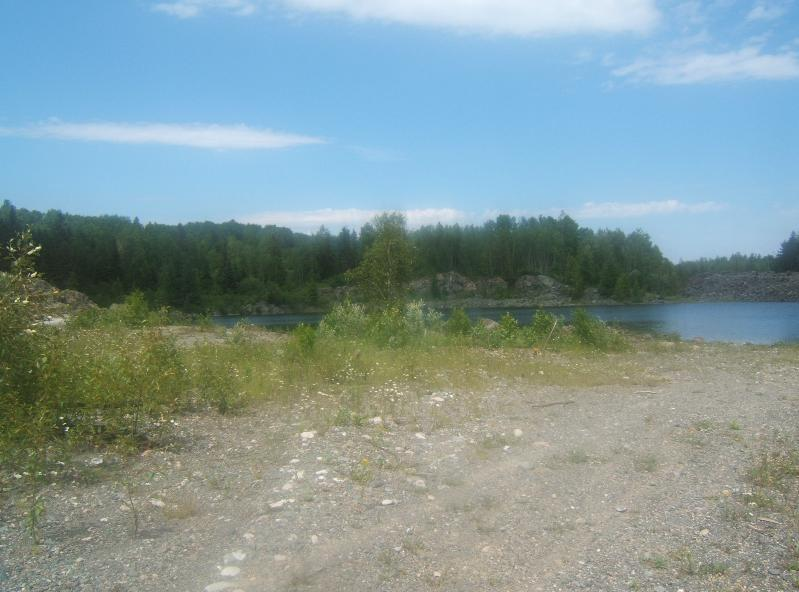
Flooded open pit at Kanichee Mine. The latest mining took place at Kanichee Mine during the 1970s

The Kanichee Mine property, formerly known as Cuniptau Mine, was first discovered in the early 1900s just before World War I began. A 7.3 m (24 ft) mine shaft with 670 m (2,200 ft) of underground lateral workings was completed on two levels in 1934. At least 11 mine claims occupied the area at the time. The core of a widespread massive sulfide deposit composed of palladium, nickel, copper, gold, cobalt, platinum and silver was mined out from underground and by an open pit from 1934 to 1936. Since 1938, at least seven different ownerships have held the Kanichee Mine property. Subsequent mining from 1974 to 1975 increased the size of the open pit and removed the shaft pillar. The open pit and underground workings have remain flooded since the mine closed in the 1970s.

Copperfields Mine, originally known as Temagami Mine, extracted both base and precious metals on Temagami Island in Lake Temagami from March 1955 until its closer in February 1972. A 200-ton mill refined ore from two open pits and underground workings off a 755 m (2,477 ft) mine shaft. For the first few years after the mine opened, ore trucks were barged down the northeastern arm of Lake Temagami to the town of Temagami, but this soon proved to be too expensive. The result was to create a gravel road from Highway 11 to the eastcentral shore of Lake Temagami. This road, now known as the Lake Temagami Access Road, was completed in 1958 and was used to transport ore from the mine site. The high-grade copper deposit in which the mine extracted was discovered by Canadian geophysicist Norman Bell Keevil (1910–1989) in the mid-20th century during testing of a newly established airborne metal detector. It was the largest deposit of nearly pure chalcopyrite ever discovered in Canada. Keevil also financed other ventures, including what became Teck Resources. By February 1972, the Copperfields mill had treated 9,125 oz (258,700 g) of gold, 175,979 oz (4,988,900 g) of silver and 76,982,986 lb (34,918,895 kg) of copper.

Along the southeastern margin of the Net Lake-Vermilion Lake Deformation Zone lies the abandoned Beanland Mine property. Exploration work in 1937–1938 resulted in the creation of a three level 154 m (505 ft) mine shaft. In February 1992, Deak Resources completed diamond drilling and bulk sampling at the mine and 3,000 tons of rock was shipped to its Kerr Mill in Virginiatown. The estimated reserves, before this work, were 8,778 tons averaging 0.31 oz (8.8 g) of gold per ton across a 1.7 m (5.6 ft) mining width and 24,000 tons averaging 0.21 oz (6.0 g) of gold per ton across a 1.6 m (5.2 ft) mining width. The mineralized zone is described as a quartz vein network, enveloped by alteration in tholeiitic basalts, paralleling the Net Lake-Vermilion Lake Deformation Zone.

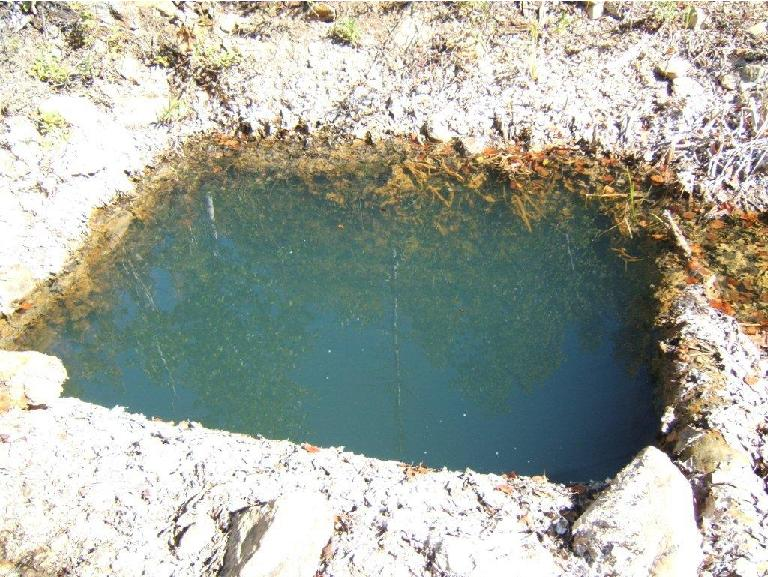
The flooded remains of a mine shaft on the Leckie Mine property, immediately east of Arsenic Lake

About 1 km (0.62 mi) north of Beanland lies the abandoned Hermiston-McCauley Mine, situated on the northwestern side of the Net Lake-Vermilion Lake Deformation Zone. From 1935 to 1940, a 115.1 m (378 ft) three-compartment mine shaft was constructed. Three levels were created, two of which had 1,853.1 m (6,080 ft) of lateral work. Reserves have been variously estimated at 31,000 tons averaging 0.275 oz (7.8 g) of gold per ton, 45,700 tons averaging 0.30 oz (8.5 g) of gold per ton over 1 m (3.3 ft), or 9,000 tons averaging 0.5 oz (14 g) of gold per ton over 0.91 m (3.0 ft). A main and subsidiary quartz-rich zone occur in a ruptured intrusion composed of diorite, which intrudes felsic volcanic rocks in a northwesterly direction with the strike of the Net Lake-Vermilion Lake Deformation Zone. The main vein is at least 76.1 m (250 ft) long and up to 1.5 m (4.9 ft) wide. Pyrite with chalcopyrite and gold occupies the quartz-rich zones as blebs and small veins.

Mining operations began at Leckie Mine, a now abandoned gold mine 3 km (1.9 mi) north of the Temagami, in the early 1900s with the construction of a 17 m (56 ft) mine shaft with 27.3 m (90 ft) of underground workings. In 1909 about 270 tons of ore was shipped out of the shaft. A 160.1 m (525 ft) mine shaft with five levels was constructed during a second period of exploration from 1930 to 1948. About 1,524 m (5,000 ft) of drifting and crosscutting was completed on all five levels.

Production continued at the Big Dan Occurrences during the early 20th century. Two shallow mine shafts were created in 1906 and were used to ship ore out of the mine. At least 0.358 oz (10.1 g) of gold per ton was sent during this period. The mine was constructed in a 610 m (2,000 ft), north striking mineralized portion of the Big Dan Shear Zone.

== See also ==
- List of greenstone belts
- List of volcanoes in Canada
- Volcanology of Eastern Canada
