= Iceland Lake Pluton =

Geologic formation in Temagami, Ontario, Canada

The Iceland Lake Pluton, formerly known as the Ingall Lake Batholith, is a large granitic intrusion in Briggs and Strathcona townships of Temagami, Northeastern Ontario, Canada. It is one of the three separate granitoid intrusions that constitute the Temagami Greenstone Belt, consisting of rocks ranging from diorite to quartz monzonite. The age of the intrusion is estimated to be about 2,736 million years old, as well as an adjacent rhyolitic lava flow using the uranium–lead dating technique. This suggests that the Iceland Lake Pluton might be the remnants of a magma chamber of a volcano that erupted felsic magma. The pluton is overlain by sediments of the younger Huronian Supergroup.

Chlorite trondhjemite of the Iceland Lake Pluton is exposed along the Lake Temagami Access Road and Iceland Lake.

== See also ==
- Spawning Lake Stock
- Chambers-Strathy Batholith
