= Surveyor Lake (Nipissing District) =

Lake in Ontario, Canada

- Location within Ontario
- Location: Nipissing District, Ontario
- Coordinates: 46°47′09″N 79°58′40″W
- Primary inflows: Temagami River
- Primary outflows: Temagami River
- Basin countries: Canada
- Max. length: 2 km (1.2 mi)
- Max. width: 0.7 km (0.43 mi)
- Surface elevation: 292 m (958 ft)

Surveyor Lake is a lake in Nipissing District, Ontario, Canada, about 30 kilometres (19 mi) southwest of the community of Temagami.

The lake is in the Lake Huron drainage basin, is about 2 kilometres (1.2 mi) long and 0.7 kilometres (0.4 mi) wide and lies at an elevation of 292 metres (958 ft). The primary inflow, at the north of the lake, is the Temagami River from Cross Lake. Secondary inflows include three unnamed creeks, one at the east, one at the west, and one from the direction of Smith Lake at the northeast. The primary outflow, at the south and controlled by the Cross Lake Dam, is the Temagami River towards Red Cedar Lake.

== See also ==
- List of lakes in Ontario
