= Redwater Lake =

Redwater Lake may refer to:

- Upper Redwater Lake, a lake in Ontario, Canada
- Lower Redwater Lake, a lake in Ontario, Canada
