= Hansen Lake (Nipissing District) =

- Location in Ontario
- Location: Nipissing District, Ontario
- Coordinates: 47°07′13″N 79°55′05″W
- Type: lake
- Part of: Great Lakes Basin
- Basin countries: Canada
- Max. length: 1,010 m (3,310 ft)
- Max. width: 890 m (2,920 ft)
- Surface elevation: 327 m (1,073 ft)

Hansen Lake is a lake in geographic Chambers Township in the municipality of Temagami, Nipissing District in Northeastern Ontario, Canada. It is in the Great Lakes Basin, and has one named island, Horr Island.

There are three unnamed inflows at the northwest, north and south. The primary outflow is an unnamed creek at the west leading to Chambers Lake that eventually leads to Lake Temagami. That lakes drains via the Temagami River, Sturgeon River, Lake Nipissing, and the French River to Georgian Bay on Lake Huron.

== See also ==
- Lakes of Temagami
