= Herridge =

Herridge is a surname. Notable people with the surname include:

- Catherine Herridge (born 1964), American journalist
- Dean Herridge (born 1976), Australian rally driver
- Herbert Wilfred Herridge (1895–1973), Canadian politician
- Robert Herridge (1914–1981), American television producer and writer
- Tom Herridge, English rugby league footballer who played in the 1900s, 1910s and 1920s, and professional boxer of the 1900s
- Victoria Herridge, British palaeontologist
- William Duncan Herridge (1887–1961), Canadian politician and diplomat

== See also ==
- Herridge Lake, lake in Ontario, Canada
