= Iceland Lake =

Lake in Northeastern Ontario, Canada

- Location within Ontario
- Location: Temagami, Ontario
- Coordinates: 46°59′47″N 79°51′56″W
- Part of: Great Lakes Basin
- Primary inflows: Herridge Creek
- Primary outflows: South Tetapaga River
- Basin countries: Canada
- Max. length: 1.3 km (0.81 mi)
- Max. width: 1.8 km (1.1 mi)
- Islands: ca. 10

Iceland Lake is a small lake in the Municipality of Temagami in Nipissing District, Northeastern Ontario, Canada. It lies in the southern half of geographic Strathcona Township with its primary inflow being Herridge Creek.

== Hydrology ==
The lake is 1.3 km (0.81 mi) long and 1.8 km (1.1 mi) wide. It represents a portion of the Lake Huron drainage basin, a large area where water drains into Lake Huron. After Iceland Lake drains into Lake Temagami via the South Tetapaga River, the water drains through the Temagami River. It then enters the Sturgeon River, which empties into Lake Nipissing. Lake Nipissing then drains into Lake Huron at Georgian Bay via the French River.

== See also ==
- Lakes of Temagami
- Iceland Lake Pluton
