= Summit Lakes (Ontario) =

Group of lakes in Ontario, Canada

- Location within Ontario
- Location: Temagami, Nipissing District, Ontario
- Coordinates: 47°01′29″N 79°45′28″W
- Part of: Ottawa River drainage basin
- Primary outflows: Unnamed creek to Upper Twin Lake
- Basin countries: Canada
- Surface elevation: 340 m (1,120 ft)

The Summit Lakes are a pair of lakes connected by a short creek in Nipissing District, Ontario, Canada, about 5 kilometres (3.1 mi) southeast of the community of Temagami. The Ontario Northland Railway mainline crosses the southern tip of the south lake on a trestle.

== Hydrology ==
The north lake is about 540 metres (1,772 ft) long and 340 metres (1,115 ft) wide, and the south lake is about 800 metres (2,625 ft) long and 400 metres (1,312 ft) wide; both lie at an elevation lies at an elevation of 340 metres (1,115 ft). A short unnamed creek flows from the south side of the north lake to the north side of the south lake; the south lake also has one unnamed creek inflow at the northeast tip. The primary outflow is an unnamed creek, from the south end of the south lake, to Upper Twin Lake, which eventually flows via Rabbit Creek, Rabbit Lake, the Matabitchuan River, Lake Timiskaming, and the Ottawa River into the St. Lawrence River.

== See also ==
- Lakes of Temagami
