= List of lakes of Ontario: I =

This is a list of lakes of Ontario beginning with the letter I.

== Ia–Ic ==
- Iagoo Lake
- Ibbitson Lake
- Ibsen Pond
- Icarus Lake
- Ice Chest Lake
- Ice Chisel Lake
- Ice Cream Lake
- Ice Lake (Herbert Township, Thunder Bay District)
- Ice Lake (GTP Block 2 Township, Thunder Bay District)
- Ice Lake (Manitoulin District)
- Ice Lake (Algoma District)
- Icefish Lake
- Iceland Lake
- Ichi Lake
- Icicle Lake
- Icy Lake

== Id–Im ==
- Ida Lake (Thunder Bay District)
- Ida Lake (Sudbury District)
- Idaho Lake
- Idsordi Lake
- Igelstrom Lake
- Igloo Lake
- Ignace Lake
- Lac des Iles
- Ilsley Lake
- Imakaw Lake
- Imp Lake
- Impasse Lake
- Imperial Lake
- Imprimis Lake
- Imrie Lake

== Ina–Ine ==
- Ina Lake
- Inar Lake
- Inbetween Lake
- Index Lake
- India Lake (Perch Lake, Kenora District)
- India Lake (Scaler Lake, Kenora District)
- Indian House Lake
- Indian Lake (Aberdeen Township, Algoma District)
- Indian Lake (Gour Township, Kenora District)
- Indian Lake (Smellie Township, Kenora District)
- Indian Lake (Frontenac County)
- Indian Lake (Auld Township, Timiskaming District)
- Indian Lake (Earl Township, Sudbury District)
- Indian Lake (Tyrrell Township, Timiskaming District)
- Indian Lake (McBride Township, Sudbury District)
- Indian Lake (Hallett Township, Algoma District)
- Indian Lake (Leeds and Grenville United Counties)
- Indian Lake (Thunder Bay District)
- Indian Lake (English River, Kenora District)
- Indian Lake (Nipissing District)
- Indian Lake (Jacobson Township, Algoma District)
- Indian Lake (Hastings County)
- Indian Pipe Lake
- Indian Trail Lake
- Indigo Lake (Nipissing District)
- Indigo Lake (Thunder Bay District)
- Inez Lake (Nipissing District)
- Inez Lake (Timiskaming District)

== Ing–Inw ==
- Ingall Lake (Kenora District)
- Ingall Lake (Nipissing District)
- Ingle Lake
- Inglis Lake (Cochrane District)
- Inglis Lake (Kenora District)
- Ingrams Lake
- Lake Inistioge
- Ink Lake (Frontenac County)
- Ink Lake (Nipissing District)
- Ink Lake (Sudbury District)
- Ink Lake (Algoma District)
- Ink Lake (Parry Sound District)
- Inland Lake
- Inlet Lake
- Inn Lake
- Inner Duck Lake
- Innes Lake
- Innis Lake
- Inright Lake
- Insect Lake (Algoma District)
- Insect Lake (Kenora District)
- Inspiration Lake
- Insula Lake
- Inter Lake
- International Lake
- Intersect Lake
- Intersection Lake
- Inverary Lake
- Inverness Lake
- Inwood Lake

== Io–Ir ==
- Iota Lake
- Iphigene Lake
- Ira Lake (Sudbury District)
- Ira Lake (Bruce County)
- Ireland Lake
- Irene Lake (Abotossaway Township, Algoma District)
- Irene Lake (Wlasy Township, Algoma District)
- Irene Lake (Talbott Township, Algoma District)
- Irene Lake (Benneweis Township, Sudbury District)
- Irene Lake (Kenora District)
- Irene Lake (Timiskaming District)
- Irene Lake (Renfrew County)
- Irene Lake (Jasper Township, Sudbury District)
- Iriam Lake
- Iris Lake (Nipissing District)
- Iris Lake (Algoma District)
- Iris Lake (Thunder Bay District)
- Iris Lake (Kenora District)
- Irish Lake (Cochrane District)
- Irish Lake (Grey County)
- Irish Lake (Parry Sound District)
- Irish Lake (Greater Sudbury)
- Irish Lake (Kenora District)
- Irish Lake (Sudbury District)
- Irish Lake (Leeds and Grenville United Counties)
- Irma Lake
- Iron Lake (Macdonald, Meredith and Aberdeen)
- Iron Lake (Hutchinson Township, Rainy River District)
- Iron Lake (Tupper Township, Algoma District)
- Iron Lake (St. Ignace Island)
- Iron Lake (Keating Township, Algoma District)
- Iron Lake (Shuniah)
- Iron Lake (Poulin Township, Algoma District)
- Iron Lake (Minnesota–Ontario)
- Iron Lake (Kenora District)
- Iron Lake (Sudbury District)
- Iron Lake (Timiskaming District)
- Iron Range Lake
- Ironside Lake
- Ironwood Lake
- Irregular Lake
- Irrigation Lake
- Irvine Lake (Kenora District)
- Irvine Lake (Muskoka District)
- Irvine Lake (Lennox and Addington County)
- Irving Lake (Sudbury District)
- Irving Lake (Algoma District)
- Irving Lake (Parry Sound District)
- Irwin Lake (Parry Sound District)
- Irwin Lake (Kenora District)
- Irwin Lake (Sudbury District)

== Isa–Isk ==
- Isaac Lake
- Isabel Lake
- Isabella Lake (Algoma District)
- Isabella Lake (Parry Sound District)
- Isabella Lake (Rainy River District)
- Isaiah Lake
- Isbister Lake (Sudbury District)
- Isbister Lake (Timiskaming District)
- Iserhoff Lake
- Ishaw Lake
- Ishkish Lake
- Ishkodewabo Lake
- Ishkuday Lake
- Ishmael Lake
- Isinglass Lake
- Lake Isis
- Isis Lake
- Iskotai Lake

== Isla ==
- Island Lake (Brown Township, Parry Sound District)
- Island Lake (Jacobson Township, Algoma District)
- Island Lake (Island River, Kenora District)
- Island Lake (Jacques Township, Thunder Bay District)
- Island Lake (Latchford)
- Island Lake (Kearney)
- Island Lake (Hart Township, Sudbury District)
- Island Lake (Bracebridge)
- Island Lake (Sagamok)
- Island Lake (Renfrew County)
- Island Lake (Garrow Township, Nipissing District)
- Island Lake (York Region)
- Island Lake (Otter Lake, Thunder Bay District)
- Island Lake (Timmins)
- Island Lake (Foch River, Thunder Bay District)
- Island Lake (Corkill Township, Timiskaming District)
- Island Lake (French River)
- Island Lake (Haycock Township, Kenora District)
- Island Lake (Greater Sudbury)
- Island Lake (Butler Township, Nipissing District)
- Island Lake (MacNicol Township, Kenora District)
- Island Lake (Aitken Township, Cochrane District)
- Island Lake (Muskoka Lakes)
- Island Lake (Pelican Township, Kenora District)
- Island Lake (Wilson Township, Parry Sound District)
- Island Lake (Matachewan 72)
- Island Lake (McIlveen Township, Algoma District)
- Islandia Lake
- Lake of Islands
- Islay Lake (Algoma District)
- Islay Lake (Kenora District)

== Isle–Iso ==
- Islealone Lake
- Lac des Isles
- Lake of the Isles
- Islet Lake (Nipissing District)
- Islet Lake (Kenora District)
- Islets Lake
- Islington Lake
- Isobel Lake

== Iv–Iz ==
- Ivan Lake (Cochrane District)
- Ivan Lake (Thunder Bay District)
- Ivan Lake (Kenora District)
- Ivanhoe Lake
- Ivy Lake (Muskoka District)
- Ivy Lake (Sudbury District)
- Izaak Lake
- Izatt Lake
