= Chambers-Strathy Batholith =

Geologic complex in Northeastern Ontario, Canada

Coordinates: 47.14°N 79.78°W

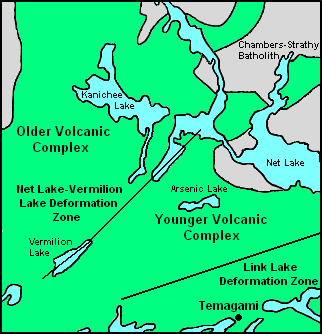
Geologic map of Strathy Township displaying portions of the Chambers–Strathy Batholith.

The Chambers-Strathy Batholith, also called the Strathy-Chambers Batholith, is a large granitoid batholith complex in the Temagami region of Northeastern Ontario, Canada. Named for the Chambers and Strathy townships, its compositions range from pink to grey quartz monzonite to granodiorite and intrudes through rocks of the Temagami Greenstone Belt.

== See also ==
- Iceland Lake Pluton
- Spawning Lake Stock
