= Cross Lake (Temagami) =

Lake in Nipissing District, Ontario, Canada

- Location within Ontario
- Location: Temagami, Nipissing District, Ontario
- Coordinates: 46°52′17″N 79°57′58″W
- Primary inflows: Channel from Lake Temagami, Temagami River
- Primary outflows: Temagami River
- Basin countries: Canada
- Max. length: 15 km (9.3 mi)
- Max. width: 4.5 km (2.8 mi)
- Surface elevation: 292 m (958 ft)

Cross Lake is a lake in Temagami, Nipissing District, Ontario, Canada, about 20 kilometres (12 mi) southwest of the centre of that community. The lake has fish inhabits of walleye, smallmouth bass and northern pike.

== Hydrology ==
The lake is about 15 km (9.3 mi) long and 4.5 kilometres (2.8 mi) wide and lies at an elevation of 292 metres (958 ft). The primary inflow, at the west of the lake, is a navigable channel from Outlet Bay on the South Arm of Lake Temagami. The channel is the primary outflow of that lake, and Cross Lake is at the same elevation as Lake Temagami. Secondary inflows are numerous unnamed creek inflows, including ones from Willis Lake at the north and McAdam Lake at the east, as well as the Temagami River at the southwest. The primary outflow is the Temagami River to Surveyor Lake, at the same elevation, at the south. The outlet from Surveyor Lake to the Temagami River further downstream to the south is controlled by the Cross Lake Dam.

== See also ==
- Priest Mine
- Lakes of Temagami
