= Red Squirrel Lake =

Lake in Ontario, Canada

- Location within Ontario
- Location: Temagami, Nipissing District, Ontario
- Coordinates: 47.158°N 80.024°W
- Basin countries: Canada

Red Squirrel Lake is located within the municipality of Temagami, in Nipissing District, Ontario, Canada. The lake can be accessed from the Red Squirrel Road.

Fish in the lake include northern pike, trout, walleye, Aurora trout and smallmouth bass.

== News ==
In July 2015, a boat was discovered without occupants floating on Red Squirrel Lake. The Temagami Ontario Provincial Police recovered two bodies from the lake who were identified as residents of Harris Township, Ontario.

== See also ==
- Lakes of Temagami
