= Marten River (Ontario) =

- Location of the mouth of the Marten River in Ontario

Location
- Country: Canada
- Province: Ontario
- Region: Northeastern Ontario
- District: Nipissing
- Municipality: Temagami

Physical characteristics
- Source: Lower Redwater Lake
  - location: Milne Township
  - coordinates: 46°53′3″N 79°38′2″W
  - elevation: 300 m (980 ft)
- Mouth: Red Cedar Lake
  - location: McCallum Township
  - coordinates: 46°43′49″N 79°53′28″W
  - elevation: 280 m (920 ft)
- Length: 46 km (29 mi)

The Marten River is a river in Nipissing District, Ontario, Canada. Situated in the Municipality of Temagami, it begins at the southern end of Lower Redwater Lake at an elevation of 300 m (980 ft). It flows westwards to the hamlet of Marten River then to Red Cedar Lake where it is 280 m (920 ft) in elevation. The Marten River has a total length of 46 km (29 mi).

== See also ==
- List of rivers of Ontario
