= Doherty, Ontario =

Doherty
- Location in Ontario
- Coordinates: 46°58′29″N 79°44′33″W
- Country: Canada
- Province: Ontario
- District: Nipissing
- Geographic Township: Riddell
- Elevation: 325 m (1,066 ft)
- Time zone: UTC-5 (Eastern Time Zone)
  - Summer (DST): UTC-4 (Eastern Time Zone)

Doherty is an unincorporated place and railway point in the municipality of Temagami, Nipissing District, Northeastern Ontario, Canada. It is in geographic Riddell Township and is located at the southwestern corner of Lower Twin Lake on the Ontario Northland Railway. Doherty is at Mileage 63.4 and was the location of a train station in the 1940s.
