= Tetapaga River =

- Location of the mouth of the Tetapaga River in Ontario

Location
- Country: Canada
- Province: Ontario
- Region: Northeastern Ontario
- District: Nipissing
- Municipality: Temagami

Physical characteristics
- Source: Tetapaga Lake
  - location: Briggs Township
  - coordinates: 47°03′04″N 79°53′07″W
  - elevation: 300 m (980 ft)
- Mouth: Lake Temagami
  - location: Briggs Township
  - coordinates: 47°2′12″N 79°53′58″W
  - elevation: 300 m (980 ft)
- Length: 2.5 km (1.6 mi)

The Tetapaga River is a small river in Nipissing District of Northeastern Ontario, Canada that runs southwest through Briggs Township from its source at Tetapaga Lake. The river flows 2.5 km (1.6 mi) before emptying into an unnamed bay of Lake Temagami.
