= The Three Sisters (Temagami) =

Three lakes in Temagami, Ontario

- Location within Ontario
- Location: Temagami, Nipissing District, Ontario
- Coordinates: 47°12′37″N 79°47′38″W
- Part of: Ottawa River drainage basin
- Primary outflows: Unnamed creek to Thieving Bear Lake
- Basin countries: Canada
- Surface elevation: 300 m (980 ft)

The Three Sisters are a trio of lakes connected by short creeks in Nipissing District, Ontario, Canada, about 15 km (9.3 mi) north of the village of Temagami. They are arranged in a north–south trending line with a maximum length of about 2.5 km (1.6 mi). This group of lakes is situated in the geographic Best Township, which makes up part of the Municipality of Temagami.

== Hydrology ==
The North Sister is about 1 km (0.62 mi) long and 300 m (980 ft) wide, the Middle Sister is about 610 m (0.38 mi) long and 1.4 km (0.87 mi) wide and the South Sister is about 500 m (1,600 ft) long and 800 m (2,600 ft) wide; all lie at an elevation of 300 m (980 ft). Three unnamed creeks flow into the North Sister at its northern end; the South Sister also has two unnamed creek inflows, one at its northern tip and another at its southeastern tip. The primary outflow is an unnamed creek, from the south end of the South Sister, to Thieving Bear Lake, which eventually flows via an unnamed creek, Net Lake, Net Creek, Cassels Lake, Rabbit Lake, the Matabitchuan River, Lake Timiskaming and the Ottawa River into the Saint Lawrence River.

== See also ==
- Lakes of Temagami
