= Redwater, Ontario =

Redwater
- Ghost town
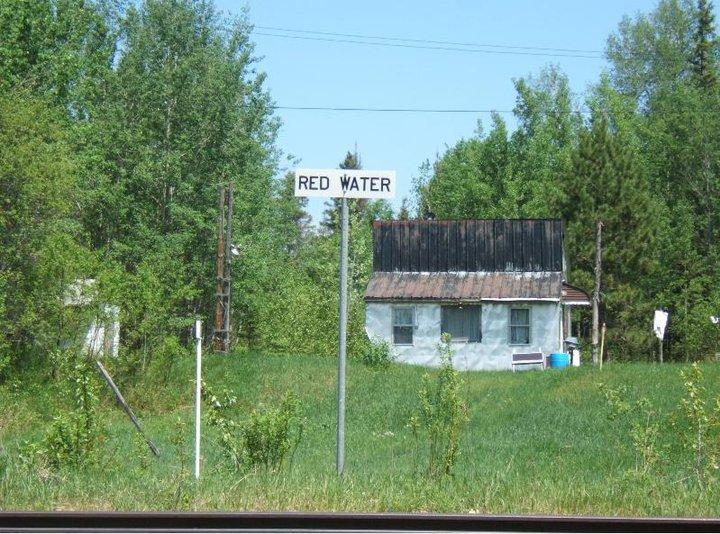
- Flat-roofed building and locality sign in Redwater

- Location within Ontario
- Coordinates: 46°53′47″N 79°38′56″W
- Country: Canada
- Province: Ontario
- District: Nipissing
- Geographic Township: Askin
- Established: 1903
- Time zone: UTC−5 (EST)
  - Summer (DST): UTC−4 (EDT)
- Postal Code: P0H
- Area code: 705

Redwater is an unincorporated place and railway point in the municipality of Temagami, Nipissing District, Northeastern Ontario, Canada. It is in geographic Askin Township and is located on the shores of Lower and Upper Redwater lakes along the Ontario Northland Railway. Redwater was the site of a settlement established in the early 1900s that survived into the 1950s.

== History ==
=== Origin ===
The community of Redwater began its formation from a small request stop on the Northern Ontario Railway in 1903 when the railway reached the area of the Upper and Lower Redwater lakes. During this time a small train station, telegraph key, a siding and water tank was constructed. The several men that worked on the railroad either lived in the train station or in a bunkhouse and two houses. At least one of the two houses was used to supply bosses of the crew.

=== 1909 tragedy ===
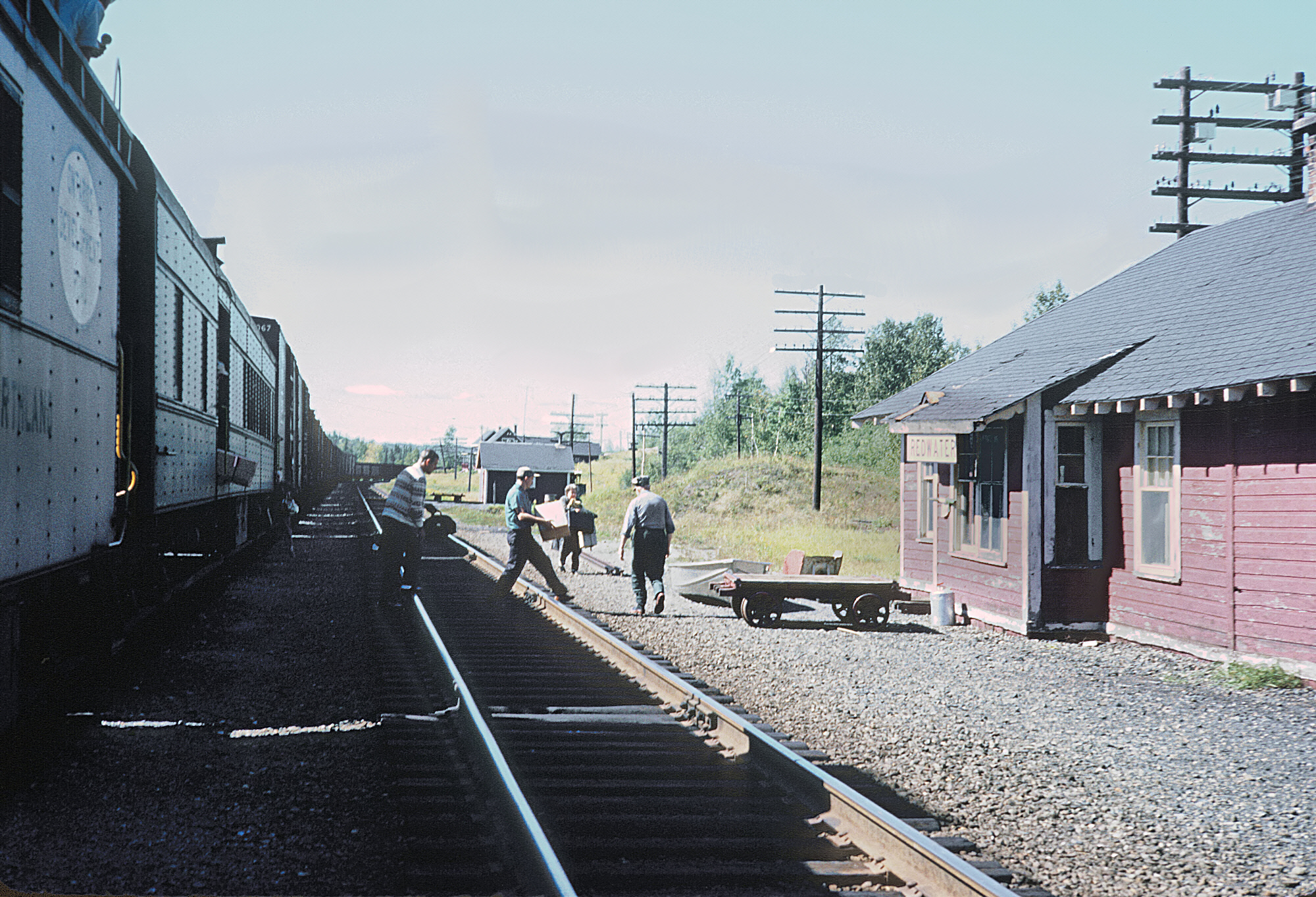
Redwater railway station in 1965

The newly formed settlement was the site of a murder in 1909 that began when two railway employees named Cornish and Morin attacked W.J. Dyston who worked as the Redwater telegraph operator. After the attack took place, Dyston had been badly beaten and had to struggle in order to get to the telegraph key. When Dyston reached the telegraph key he managed to call for help. Subsequently, Dyston collapsed onto the telegraph key after he sent an incoherent message and died. It was during this time the name Redwater retained a new meaning for the settlement.

=== Formation and closure of the Redwater sawmill ===
A few years after the death of W.J. Dyston, the Redwater Lumber Company constructed a small sawmill in the area. Its lumber yards were located adjacent to Redwater's train station so that the lumber would easily be exported by train. A bunkhouse was created to supply homes for those that worked at the sawmill and subsequent houses were built along the railway. In 1916, a store and post office opened and were operated by a customer named T.J. Baker. The Redwater sawmill ceased around 1928 but the community still remained populated. A railroad car was used to supply a school from the 1940s up until the 1950s when at least five homes still existed.

=== Cessation of Redwater and later years ===
Because of the closure of the Redwater sawmill, the residents of Redwater only lived there for a time. The post office that opened in 1916 closed in 1942 but the train station still remained in 1945. Homes were subsequently destroyed, with the last burning down in the 1950s. In 1957, the Redwater water tower was burnt down. After this took place, a series of cottages were constructed on the townsite in the 1960s and are still used today. Remains of the early ghost town of Redwater are buried under extensive overgrowth and include foundations where the houses were located and a few root cellars. An aluminum shed behind the site of Redwater's original train station is used by the Ontario Northland Railway.

== See also ==
- Milne Townsite
- Temagami North
