= Upper Redwater Lake =

Lake in Ontario, Canada

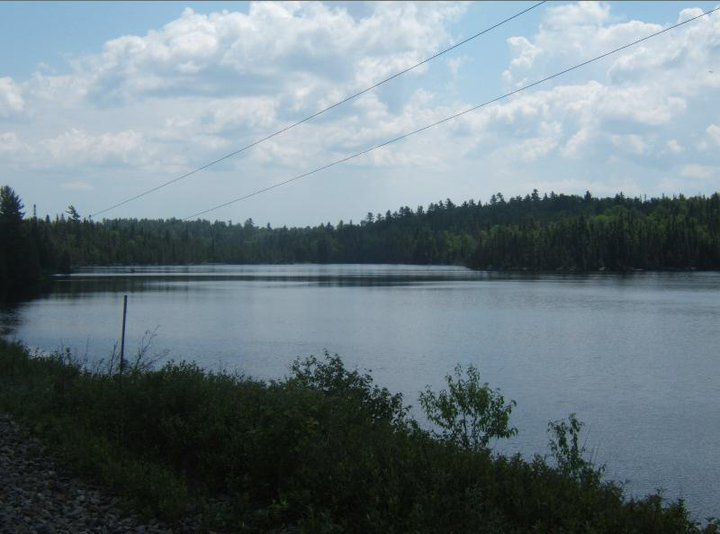
- Upper Redwater Lake as seen from along the Ontario Northland Railway where the railroad crosses its northern end.

- Location within Ontario
- Location: Temagami, Ontario
- Coordinates: 46°53′56″N 79°39′44″W
- Basin countries: Canada
- Max. length: 3.2 km (2.0 mi)

Upper Redwater Lake is a narrow freshwater lake in the municipality of Temagami of Northeastern Ontario, Canada, located southeast of the former Rabbit Creek ballast pit along Rabbit Creek Road that comes out at Highway 11. The settlement of Redwater is located on the southeastern shore of Upper Redwater Lake and the Ontario Northland Railway mainline runs along its entire western shore. Its northern end is crossed by the Ontario Northland Railway where the lake sways northeastwards. At the southern end of the lake is a strait that connects Upper Redwater Lake with Lower Redwater Lake.

Upper Redwater Lake contains fish populations of walleye, smallmouth bass and northern pike.

== See also ==
- Lakes of Temagami
