= Snowshoe Lake (Temagami) =

Lake in Nipissing District, Ontario, Canada

- Location within Ontario
- Location: Temagami, Nipissing District, Ontario
- Coordinates: 46°58′49″N 79°54′30″W
- Primary outflows: Unnamed creek to Wasaksina Lake
- Basin countries: Canada
- Max. length: 1.4 km (0.87 mi)
- Max. width: 1.0 km (0.62 mi)
- Surface elevation: 308 m (1,010 ft)

Snowshoe Lake is a T-shaped lake in the Great Lakes Basin in Temagami, Nipissing District, Ontario, Canada. It is about 1,400 metres (4,593 ft) long and 1,000 metres (3,281 ft) wide, and lies at an elevation of 308 metres (1,010 ft). The primary outflow is an unnamed creek to Wasaksina Lake, which flows via intermediate lakes into Shiningwood Bay on Lake Temagami.

== See also ==
- Lakes of Temagami
