= Canadian Council on Geomatics =

Canadian government agency

The Canadian Council on Geomatics (CCOG) was created in 1972. It is the major federal-provincial-territorial consultative body for geographic information management. CCOG meets twice a year to discuss programs, developments, legislation, and issues relevant to geomatics. CCOG oversees the GeoBase initiative.
