= Tetapaga Syncline =

Syncline in Northeastern Ontario, Canada

The Tetapaga Syncline, also known as the Lake Tetapaga Syncline, is a northeasterly trending syncline in Northeastern Ontario, Canada, located in Strathy Township of the municipality of Temagami. It represents a major structural feature in the Temagami Greenstone Belt, with dark green, massive and pillowed iron-rich tholeiitic basalts forming its core.
