= Red Cedar Lake (Ontario) =

- Location within Ontario
- Location: Nipissing District, Ontario
- Coordinates: 46.715°N 79.936°W
- Type: Reservoir
- Primary inflows: Temagami River, Marten River
- Primary outflows: Temagami River
- Basin countries: Canada
- Max. length: 30 km (19 mi)
- Surface area: 5,984 acres (2,422 ha)

Red Cedar Lake is a lake in Nipissing District of Northeastern Ontario, Canada. The lake is about 30 km in length.

The Marten River flows into the lake and the Temagami River flows through the lake.

It is a man made lake originally created by damming to permit logging drives. Red Cedar Lake now serves as a man-made reservoir for hydro-electric generating stations and the water level may vary because of this.

Red Cedar Lake contains fish populations of walleye, northern pike, smallmouth bass, yellow perch, whitefish, and lake trout.

perimeter of 82.6 miles (132.9 km)

== See also ==
- List of lakes in Ontario
