= Twin Lakes (Temagami) =

Lakes in Ontario, Canada

- Location of the Twin Lakes in Ontario
- Location: Temagami, Nipissing District, Ontario
- Coordinates: 46°59′42″N 79°44′18″W
- Part of: Ottawa River drainage basin
- Primary outflows: Unnamed creek
- Basin countries: Canada
- Surface elevation: 320 m (1,050 ft)

The Twin Lakes are a pair of lakes connected by a channel in Nipissing District, Ontario, Canada, about 6 km (3.7 mi) southeast of the village of Temagami. They are individually named Upper Twin Lake and Lower Twin Lake.

== Hydrology ==
Upper Twin Lake is about 4 km (2.5 mi) long and 2.3 km (1.4 mi) wide, and Lower Twin Lake is about 2 km (1.2 mi) long and 0.80 km (0.50 mi) wide; both lie at an elevation of 320 m (1,050 ft). Monshan Island in Lower Twin Lake is the only named island of the Twin Lakes.

The primary outflow is an unnamed creek in the southwestern corner of Lower Twin Lake, which eventually flows via Rabbit Creek, Rabbit Lake, the Matabitchuan River, Lake Timiskaming and the Ottawa River into the Saint Lawrence River.

== Transportation ==
The Ontario Northland Railway mainline runs along the entire western side of Lower Twin Lake and along the southeastern side of Upper Twin Lake; it crosses the narrows of the lakes on a bridge. A railway point named Doherty lies at the southwestern corner of Lower Twin Lake.

== Geology ==
Situated on an abandoned railway siding near Upper Twin Lake is a 10 cm (3.9 in) wide calcite-quartz vein mineralized with minor pyrite, arsenopyrite and smaltite. This mineral showing, known as the Upper Twin Lake Occurrence, is hosted in diabase of a Nipissing sill just north of a contact with pebbly greywackes and conglomerates of the Coleman Member of the Gowganda Formation. The vein strikes in a southeast direction and is traceable for a distance of 2 to 3 m (6.6 to 9.8 ft). Sampling has indicated low silver and copper values with 50 parts per billion platinum and 30 parts per billion palladium.

== See also ==
- Lakes of Temagami
