= Tetapaga Lake =

Lake in Ontario, Canada

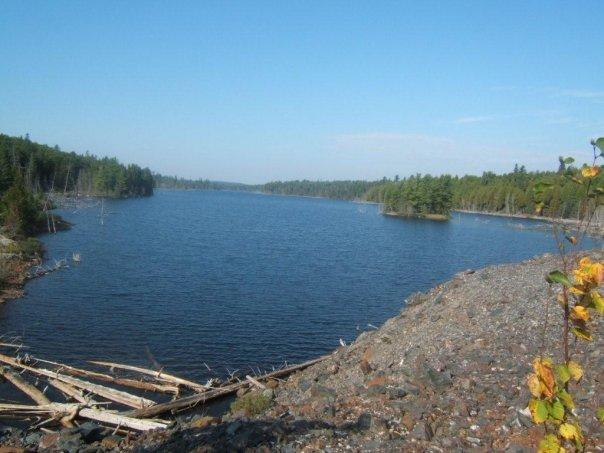
- A view down the western portion of Tetapaga Lake

- Location within Ontario
- Location: Temagami, Ontario
- Coordinates: 46°53′56″N 79°39′44″W
- Primary outflows: Tetapaga River
- Basin countries: Canada

Tetapaga Lake, also known as Lake Tetapaga, is a narrow east–west trending lake in the Temagami region of Northeastern Ontario, Canada, located at the abandoned iron-bearing Sherman Mine. A gravel road crosses the central portion of the lake, splitting it into two small lakes. The eastern half of Tetapaga Lake is somewhat green in colour due to acid mine drainage water flowing into the lake. The acid mine drainage water results from water seeping through the abandoned iron ore of Sherman Mine along its eastern shore. Its western half is relatively uninfected where very little waste from Sherman Mine exists.

== See also ==
- Lakes of Temagami
