= Herridge Lake =

Lake in Ontario, Canada

- Interactive map of Herridge Lake
- Location: Temagami, Ontario
- Coordinates: 46°58′57″N 79°49′30″W
- Primary inflows: Herridge Creek
- Primary outflows: Herridge Creek
- Basin countries: Canada
- Max. length: 4.8 km (3.0 mi)

Herridge Lake is a lake in the Temagami region of northern Ontario. The lake is 4.8 km (3.0 mi) in length, and located 54 miles north of North Bay.

Herridge Lake has many bays, inlets, weed beds, and shoals. The lake is 159 feet deep in some spots. There are two lodges/resorts on Herridge Lake: one is Lake Herridge Lodge & Resort, and the other is Jammich Camp & Cabins.

Herridge Lake contains fish populations of walleye, smallmouth bass, northern pike and lake trout.

== See also ==
- Lakes of Temagami
