= GeoBase (geospatial data) =

Canadian government intitiave managing geospatial data of Canada

GeoBase is a federal, provincial and territorial government initiative that is overseen by the Canadian Council on Geomatics (CCOG). It is undertaken to ensure the provision of, and access to, a common, up-to-date and maintained base of quality geospatial data for Canada. Through the GeoBase, users with an interest in geomatics have access to quality geospatial information at no cost and with unrestricted use.

== GeoBase Principles ==
These are the fundamental principles that GeoBase operates under and that direct the decision making process on a regular basis:

1. Source, regional and—where practical—national data all share the same geometry.
2. GeoBase provides national data coverages.
3. Source data is collected once and used by many.
4. Source data is collected and maintained closest to the source.
5. The cost of maintenance and update is shared among the levels of government.
6. All GeoBase data is available at no charge.
7. GeoBase data has no restrictions on its subsequent use.
8. GeoBase data uses a common license.

== Data Layers ==
Provincial, territorial, and municipal stakeholders agreed to work together to ensure the availability of high-quality geospatial data covering the entire Canadian landmass. These data is collected once and maintained closest to the source and provided free through the GeoBase with no restrictions for users.

GeoBase has partnerships with federal, provincial, territorial, municipal government, and private companies, with the dual goals of eliminating data duplication and optimizing collectively available resources. GeoBase partners are involved in different levels of the data production process such as project funding, sharing of source data or by working on data collection and data processing.

All GeoBase data must conform to the following technical characteristics:

1. GeoBase data elements carry a unique and singular ID.
2. GeoBase data comply with a standard data model and meet or exceed a minimum standard for accuracy, resolution, and currency.
3. Metadata is defined and standardized at the entity level.
4. GeoBase data and all associated tools adhere to international standards.
5. GeoBase data is seamless across Canada.
6. GeoBase data is consistent across layers.

=== Geographical Names Data Base ===
The purpose of this layer is to store names and their attributes that have been approved by the Geographical Names Board of Canada (GNBC) and to make these authoritative records available for government and public use. These records include the names of over 70,000 populated places and administrative areas; 300,000 water features; and 115,000 terrain features (e.g., mountains and peninsulas).

==== Partners ====
Provincial and Territorial Agencies

British Columbia	BC Geographical Names
Alberta	Tourism, Parks, and Recreation
Saskatchewan	Information Services Corporation of Saskatchewan
Manitoba	Manitoba Geographical Names Program
Ontario	Ministry of Natural Resources
Quebec	Commission de toponymie du Québec
New Brunswick	Historic Places
Prince Edward Island	Provincial Treasury
Nova Scotia	Geographic Information Services
Newfoundland and Labrador	Department of Environment and Conservation
Yukon	Department of Tourism and Culture
Northwest Territories	Prince of Wales Northern Heritage Centre
Nunavut	Government of Nunavut

Federal Agencies

Canada Post; Canadian Hydrographic Service; Elections Canada; Earth Sciences; Geological Survey of Canada; Indian and Northern Affairs Canada; Library and Archives Canada; Natural Resources Canada; Department of National Defence; Parks Canada; Statistics Canada; Translation Bureau

=== National Road Network ===
Since 2003, GeoBase has provided a consistent, accurate, and current NRN. The first edition of the NRN depicted the centerline of over 1.1 million kilometers of non-restricted use roads in Canada. In the fall of 2007, the second edition of the NRN was launched. NRN 2.0 includes place names, street names, and address ranges between intersections.

Road network data provides the framework for many geomatics applications such as mapping, geocoding, geographic searching, and area delineations. NRN data can be used in a wide variety of activities, including managing road operations, business development and marketing, transportation, and government services delivery (e.g. census and elections).

==== Partners ====
The following organizations are 'closest to the source' partners actively working as the authoritative data providers of GeoBase's National Road Network:

Provincial and Territorial Agencies

British Columbia	Base Mapping and Geomatic Services
Alberta	Infrastructure and Transportation
Saskatchewan	Information Services Corporation
Manitoba	Manitoba Conservation and Water Stewardship
Ontario	Land Information Ontario
Prince Edward Island	Transportation and Public Works
Nova Scotia	Geographic Information Services
Yukon	Yukon Government
Northwest Territories	Northwest Territories Centre for Geomatics

Federal Agencies

Natural Resources Canada	Natural Resources Canada
GeoConnections	GeoConnections
Statistics Canada	Statistics Canada
Elections Canada	Elections Canada
National Defence and the Canadian Armed Forces Canada	Centre for Security Science (DRDC CSS)

=== Geopolitical Boundaries ===
This data layer contains the international, inter-provincial, and territorial boundaries, as well as the boundaries of Canada’s exclusive economic zone. It is not intended for legal use, and should be utilized for cartographic purposes only. The dataset is composed of three files: an administrative boundary file, an administrative areas file, and a metadata file.

==== Partners ====
The authoritative data source providers for this data layer are:

- Statistics Canada
- Elections Canada
- International Boundary Commission
- Canadian Hydrographic Service
- Province of Ontario
- Surveyor General Branch

=== National Hydro Network ===
The NHN focuses on providing a quality geometric description and a set of basic attributes describing Canada’s inland surface waters. It provides geospatial digital data describing hydrographic features such as lakes, reservoirs, rivers, etc., as well as a linear drainage network and the toponymic information (geographical names) associated to hydrography.

==== Partners ====
GeoBase is joined by the following provincial/territorial partners for this data layer:

British Columbia	Integrated Resource Operations - GeoBC
Quebec	Ministère de l'Énergie et des Ressources naturelles
Yukon	Highways and Public Works - Geomatics Yukon
Ontario	Ministry of Natural Resources

=== Geodetic Network ===
The Canadian Geodetic Network data has created a dynamic infrastructure to serve both present and future needs for positioning. As well as being a GPS control network, the Geodetic Network can serve as a monitoring network for deformation studies of the Canadian landmass.

=== Satellite Orthoimages ===
GeoBase Orthoimage 2005–2010 is made from SPOT 4/5 earth observation data covering Canada's landmass south of the 81st parallel; approximately 5000 images will be acquired during the period 2005–2010. Each orthorectified satellite image covers an area of approximately 3 600 km^{2}, or 60×60 km of the Earth’s surface. In addition, Landsat 7 provides a complete set of cloud-free orthoimages covering the Canadian landmass.

The GeoBase SPOT 4 and SPOT 5 orthoimagery can be used in a wide variety of applications including: mapping; agriculture; forestry; geology; land-use planning and management; maritime monitoring; disaster management and mitigation; and in defence, intelligence, and security.

GeoBase SPOT orthoimagery is aligned with, and can be integrated with, other GeoBase data layers. It can also be used in combination with other remotely sensed data.

==== Partners ====
With funding support from GeoConnections, the following federal and provincial/territorial agencies jointly contributed to the production of the orthoimages:

Provincial and Territorial Agencies

British Columbia	Base Mapping and Geomatic Services
Alberta	Environment and Sustainable Resource Development
Saskatchewan	Information Services Corporation of Saskatchewan; Saskatchewan Research Council
Manitoba	Manitoba Conservation and Water Stewardship
Ontario	Ministry of Natural Resources
Quebec	Ministère de l'Énergie et des Ressources naturelles
New Brunswick	Service New Brunswick
Prince Edward Island	Government of Prince Edward Island
Nova Scotia	Service Nova Scotia and Municipal Relations
Newfoundland and Labrador	Government Services
Yukon	Highways and Public Works - Geomatics Yukon
Northwest Territories	Centre for Geomatics
Nunavut	Community and Government Services

Federal Agencies

Agriculture and Agri-Food Canada; Canadian Transport Agency; Elections Canada; Environment Canada; Fisheries and Oceans Canada; Indian and Northern Affairs Canada; National Defence; Natural Resources Canada; Parks Canada; Statistics Canada; Public Safety Canada.

=== Canadian Digital Elevation Data ===
Canadian Digital Elevation Data (CDED) consists of an ordered array of ground elevations at regularly spaced intervals. The source digital data for CDED is extracted from the hypsographic and hydrographic elements of the National Topographic Data Base (NTDB) or various scaled positional data acquired from the provinces and territories.

==== Partners ====
Natural Resources Canada (NRCan) and the following provincial agencies jointly produced the CDED files, with funding support from GeoConnections:

Provincial Agencies

British Columbia	Base Mapping and Geomatic Services
Alberta	Environment and Sustainable Resource Development
Ontario	Ministry of Natural Resources
Nova Scotia	Service Nova Scotia and Municipal Relations
Yukon	Yukon Department of Highways & Public Works

Federal Agencies

Natural Resources Canada	Canadian Forest Service; Earth Sciences

=== New Data Layers ===
A process is required for the acceptance of a new data theme into GeoBase. The objectives of having such a process are:

1. Ensure that any theme added to GeoBase will meet the requirements of most Canadian geomatics data clients.
2. Ensure that the data for the theme to be added is or will be available with some long term certainty.
3. Ensure that data custodians and coordinators will adhere to the GeoBase principles.
