= Lower Redwater Lake =

Lake in Ontario, Canada

- Location within Ontario
- Location: Temagami, Ontario
- Coordinates: 46°53′03″N 79°38′02″W
- Primary outflows: Marten River
- Basin countries: Canada

Lower Redwater Lake is a freshwater lake in the municipality of Temagami of Northeastern Ontario, Canada. It is located near the settlement of Redwater. The prima‌ry outflow is the Marten River.

== See also ==
- Lakes of Temagami
