= Strathcona Township =

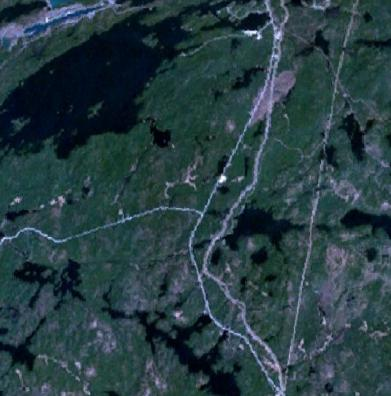
- Satellite view of Strathcona Township

- Location of Strathcona Township in Ontario
- Coordinates: 47°01′03″N 79°49′11″W
- Country: Canada
- Province: Ontario
- Region: Northeastern Ontario
- District: Nipissing
- Municipality: Temagami
- Time zone: UTC-5 (Eastern Time Zone)
  - Summer (DST): UTC-4 (Eastern Time Zone)
- Area codes: 705, 249

Strathcona Township is a geographic township comprising a portion of the municipality of Temagami in Northeastern Ontario, Canada. It is used for geographic purposes, such as land surveying and natural resource explorations. A portion of the northeast arm of Lake Temagami lies at its northwestern corner. Neighbouring geographic townships include Strathy Township, Chambers Township, Briggs Township, Riddle Township and Cassels Township.
