= Temagami River =

River in Ontario, Canada

- Location within Ontario

Location
- Country: Canada
- Province: Ontario
- District: Nipissing

Physical characteristics
- Source: Lake Temagami
  - location: Temagami
  - coordinates: 46°50′48″N 80°00′30″W
- Mouth: Sturgeon River
  - location: West Nipissing
  - coordinates: 46°34′45″N 80°11′16″W
  - elevation: 224 m (734 ft)
- Length: 64 km (40 mi)
- Discharge
  - location: Red Cedar Lake dam
  - average: 31.1 m^{3}/s (1,100 cu ft/s)

Basin features
- Progression: Sturgeon→ Lake Nipissing

The Temagami River, formerly spelled as Timagami River, is a river in the Nipissing District of Ontario, Canada, in the Temagami region. Its source is Lake Temagami and flows through Cross Lake and Red Cedar Lake. It flows into the Sturgeon River at the community of River Valley.

The Temagami River is known for its whitewater paddling opportunities. It has a high concentration of novice to advanced whitewater stretches mixed with calm flatwater, in all 20 sets of rapids, rated CI to CIII that can be run all season. In particular, the rapids of Ragged Chutes are popular with canoeists.

Its water level is controlled by the Cross Lake Dam, located on Surveyor Lake, which is also used to control waterflow out of Lake Temagami. Another 3 dams are on the river at Red Cedar Lake.

Fish species found in the Temagami River include smallmouth bass, largemouth bass, walleye, and northern pike.

== Temagami River Provincial Park ==
Temagami River Provincial Park
- IUCN category II (national park)
- Coordinates: 46°41′14″N 79°59′42″W
- Length: 30 km (19 mi)
- Area: 3,394 ha (13.10 sq mi)
- Designation: Waterway
- Established: 2000
- Governing body: Ontario Parks
- Website: www.ontarioparks.com/park/temagamiriver

The Temagami River Provincial Park protects a 30 kilometres (19 mi) long section of the river and its banks, from Surveyor Lake to Baie Jeanne Road which is about 8 kilometres (5.0 mi) northeast of its mouth at River Valley. Also included are all of Thistle Lake and the islands in the southern part of Red Cedar Lake. It was established in 2000 and protects an outstanding water route that provides recreational paddling opportunities. Other activities include hunting, fishing, and wildlife/nature viewing.

The eastern side of the park abuts the 1,343 hectares (3,320 acres) Holdridge Creek Conservation Reserve.

Mostly white cedar and yellow birch are found along the upper portions of the river, with mature or old pine/mixed hardwood stands on the valley slopes. The Red Cedar and Thistle Lakes area typically contains old-growth pine forests, as well as black ash swamps, with mixed and tolerant hardwood uplands. The lower section of the Temagami River is lined with mixed pine communities on the north shore, and pine/hardwood forests on the south shore. Also found in this section are black ash swamps and open wetlands. The forests in the park are moderately-rich to rich coniferous forests, or sugar maple forests, with red maple and red oak in the uplands.

It is a non-operating park, meaning that there are no services. The only facilities are 15 backcountry campsites.

== See also ==
- List of rivers of Ontario
