= Briggs Township, Ontario =

Briggs Township
- Township
- Location of Briggs Township in Ontario
- Coordinates: 47°01′12″N 79°57′20″W
- Country: Canada
- Province: Ontario
- Time zone: UTC-5 (Eastern Time Zone)
  - Summer (DST): UTC-4 (Eastern Time Zone)
- Area codes: 705, 249

Briggs Township is a geographic township comprising a portion of the municipality of Temagami in Northeastern Ontario, Canada. It is used for geographic purposes, such as land surveying and natural resource explorations. Neighbouring geographic townships include Chambers Township, Joan Township and Strathcona Township.
