= Chambers Township, Ontario =

Chambers
- geographic township
- Location of Chambers Township in Ontario
- Coordinates: 47°06′19″N 79°56′55″W
- Country: Canada
- Province: Ontario
- Region: Northeastern Ontario
- District: Nipissing
- Municipality: Temagami
- Elevation: 343 m (1,125 ft)
- Time zone: UTC-5 (Eastern Time Zone)
  - Summer (DST): UTC-4 (Eastern Time Zone)
- Area codes: 705, 249

Chambers Township is a square-shaped geographic township comprising a portion of the municipality of Temagami in Nipissing District, Northeastern Ontario, Canada. It is used for geographic purposes, such as land surveying and natural resource explorations. Neighbouring geographic townships include Strathy Township, Briggs Township, Strathcona Township, Best Township and Banting Township.
