= East Dunrankin River =

- Location of the mouth of the East Dunrankin River in Ontario

Location
- Country: Canada
- Province: Ontario
- Region: Northeastern Ontario
- Districts: Algoma; Sudbury

Physical characteristics
- Source: Unnamed marsh
  - location: Bonar Township, Sudbury District
  - coordinates: 48°23′26″N 83°04′42″W
  - elevation: 349 m (1,145 ft)
- Mouth: Dunrankin River
  - location: Stefansson Township, Algoma District
  - coordinates: 48°34′57″N 83°04′14″W
  - elevation: 305 m (1,001 ft)

Basin features
- River system: James Bay drainage basin

The East Dunrankin River is a river in Algoma District and Sudbury District in northeastern Ontario, Canada. It is in the James Bay drainage basin, and is a right tributary of the Dunrankin River.

== Course ==
The river begins at an unnamed marsh in geographic Bonar Township, Sudbury District, and flows north before heading into Algoma District at geographic Kirkwall Township, then continues north to flow under the Canadian National Railway transcontinental railway main line, completed in 1915 as the Canadian Northern Railway, between the railway points of Dunrankin to the west and Agate to the east, at this point passed but not served by Via Rail transcontinental Canadian trains. The river continues north, enters geographic Stefansson Township, and immediately reaches its mouth at the Dunrankin River. The Dunrankin River flows via the Kapuskasing River, the Mattagami River and the Moose River to James Bay.

== Sources ==
- Map 14 (PDF) (Map). 1 : 1,600,000. Official road map of Ontario. Ministry of Transportation of Ontario. 2010-01-01.
- Restructured municipalities – Ontario map #3 (Map). Restructuring Maps of Ontario. Ontario Ministry of Municipal Affairs and Housing. 2006. Archived from the original on 2014-04-10.
