= Nemegosenda River =

Nemegosenda River Rivière Nemegosenda, Trout River
- Location of the mouth of the Nemegosenda River in Ontario

Location
- Country: Canada
- Province: Ontario
- Region: Northeastern Ontario
- Districts: Algoma; Sudbury

Physical characteristics
- Source: Nemegos Lake
  - location: Halsey Township, Sudbury District
  - coordinates: 47°43′05″N 83°12′18″W
  - elevation: 431 m (1,414 ft)
- Mouth: Kapuskasing River
  - location: Kapuskasing Township, Algoma District
  - coordinates: 48°31′47″N 82°52′43″W
  - elevation: 310 m (1,020 ft)

Basin features
- River system: James Bay drainage basin
- Tributaries
  - left: Borden River

The Nemegosenda River (Official name in French: Rivière Nemegosenda; historically also called the Trout River) is a river in Algoma District and Sudbury District in northeastern Ontario, Canada. It is in the James Bay drainage basin, and is a right tributary of the Kapuskasing River.

== Course ==
The river begins at Nemegos Lake in geographic Halsey Township, Sudbury District, and flows northeast under the Canadian Pacific Railway transcontinental railway main line at the community of Nemegos, location of the Nemegos railway station served by the Via Rail Sudbury–White River train. The river continues north into geographic McNaught Township, then northeast through the northwestern tip of Lackner Township into geographic Gamey Township. The river loops west then east through geographic Borden Township back to Gamey township then goes north into geographic Chewett Township, flows under Ontario Highway 101, then heads northwest to Nemegosenda Lake, where it takes in the left tributary Borden River.

The river leaves the lake from geographic Collins Township at the north and heads north; the Chapleau-Nemegosenda River Provincial Park, operated by Ontario Parks, begins just north of the outflow from the lake. It continues northeast through the southwest tip of geographic Alcorn Township then the northwest corner of geographic Paul Township to geographic Lincoln Township and reaches Frog Lake. The river heads north, straddling the western border of the township and the eastern border of geographic Copperfield Township adjacent to the west, before flowing northeast into geographic Sherlock Township. The river enters geographic Kapuskasing Township in Algoma District, and flows under the Canadian National Railway transcontinental railway main line, between the railway points of Elsas to the west and Oatland to the east; the line is served at Elsas railway station by Via Rail transcontinental Canadian trains. It then heads northwest and reaches its mouth at the Kapuskasing River, immediately downstream of that river's source at Kapuskasing Lake. The Kapuskasing River flows via the Mattagami River and the Moose River to James Bay.

== Tributaries ==
- Lougheed Creek (right)
- Shiners Creek (right)
- Sherlock Creek (right)
- Paul Creek (right)
- Nemegosenda Lake
  - Borden River (left)
- Roswell Creek (right)
- Kilpatrick Creek (left)
- Lackner Creek (right)
- Poulin Creek (left)
- Nemegos Lake
  - Koko Creek

== Sources ==
- Map 14 (PDF) (Map). 1 : 1,600,000. Official road map of Ontario. Ministry of Transportation of Ontario. 2010-01-01.
- Restructured municipalities - Ontario map #3 (Map). Restructuring Maps of Ontario. Ontario Ministry of Municipal Affairs and Housing. 2006. Archived from the original on 2014-04-10.
- Restructured municipalities - Ontario map #4 (Map). Restructuring Maps of Ontario. Ontario Ministry of Municipal Affairs and Housing. 2006. Archived from the original on 2014-04-10.
