= Little Shawmere River =

- Location of the mouth of the Little Shawmere River in Ontario

Location
- Country: Canada
- Province: Ontario
- Region: Northeastern Ontario
- District: Sudbury

Physical characteristics
- Source: Murdock Lake
  - location: Murdock Township
  - coordinates: 48°06′04″N 82°55′12″W
  - elevation: 388 m (1,273 ft)
- Mouth: Shawmere River
  - location: Paul Township
  - coordinates: 48°08′38″N 82°51′39″W
  - elevation: 366 m (1,201 ft)

Basin features
- River system: James Bay drainage basin

The Little Shawmere River is a river in Sudbury District in northeastern Ontario, Canada. It is in the James Bay drainage basin, and is a left tributary of the Shawmere River.

The river flows from Murdock Lake in geographic Murdock Township and flows northeast into geographic Paul Township to its mouth at the Shawmere River. The Shawmere River flows via the Ivanhoe River, the Groundhog River, the Mattagami River and the Moose River to James Bay.

== Sources ==
- Map 14 (PDF) (Map). 1 : 1,600,000. Official road map of Ontario. Ministry of Transportation of Ontario. 2010-01-01.
- Restructured municipalities - Ontario map #3 (Map). Restructuring Maps of Ontario. Ontario Ministry of Municipal Affairs and Housing. 2006.
