= Kirkwall River =

- Location of the mouth of the Kirkwall River in Ontario

Location
- Country: Canada
- Province: Ontario
- Region: Northeastern Ontario
- Districts: Algoma; Sudbury

Physical characteristics
- Source: Unnamed marsh
  - location: Bonar Township, Sudbury District
  - coordinates: 48°26′08″N 83°07′27″W
  - elevation: 348 m (1,142 ft)
- Mouth: Dunrankin River
  - location: Kirkwall Township, Algoma District
  - coordinates: 48°33′58″N 83°08′12″W
  - elevation: 316 m (1,037 ft)

Basin features
- River system: James Bay drainage basin

The Kirkwall River is a river in Algoma District and Sudbury District in northeastern Ontario, Canada. It is in the James Bay drainage basin, and is a right tributary of the Dunrankin River.

== Course ==
The river begins at an unnamed marsh in geographic Bonar Township, in the Unorganized North Part of Sudbury District, and flows northwest. It enters the Unorganized North Part of Algoma District at geographic Kirkwall Township, continues northwest, then turns northeast, and reaches its mouth at the Dunrankin River, about 3.2 kilometres (2.0 mi) southwest of the railway point of Dunrankin on the Canadian National Railway transcontinental railway main line. The Dunrankin River flows via the Kapuskasing River, the Mattagami River and the Moose River to James Bay.
