= Little Swanson River =

- Location of the mouth of the Little Swanson River in Ontario

Location
- Country: Canada
- Province: Ontario
- Region: Northeastern Ontario
- District: Sudbury

Physical characteristics
- Source: Unnamed lake
  - location: Racine Township
  - coordinates: 48°03′51″N 83°21′49″W
  - elevation: 444 m (1,457 ft)
- Mouth: Swanson River
  - location: Lipsett Township
  - coordinates: 48°13′58″N 83°11′24″W
  - elevation: 360 m (1,180 ft)

Basin features
- River system: James Bay drainage basin

The Little Swanson River is a river in Sudbury District in northeastern Ontario, Canada. It is in the James Bay drainage basin, begins at an unnamed lake, and is a right tributary of the Swanson River.

== Course ==
The river begins in geographic Racine Township and flows northeast through a series of small, unnamed lakes into geographic Floranna Township where it reaches Robson Lake. The river heads north into geographic Sadler Township, then geographic Lipsett Township, continues north, and reaches its mouth at the Swanson River. The Swanson River flows via the Chapleau River, the Kapuskasing River, the Mattagami River and the Moose River to James Bay.

== Sources ==
- Map 14 (PDF) (Map). 1 : 1,600,000. Official road map of Ontario. Ministry of Transportation of Ontario. 2010-01-01.
- Restructured municipalities - Ontario map #3 (Map). Restructuring Maps of Ontario. Ontario Ministry of Municipal Affairs and Housing. 2006.
