= Swanson River (Ontario) =

- Location of the mouth of the Swanson River in Ontario

Location
- Country: Canada
- Province: Ontario
- Region: Northeastern Ontario
- District: Sudbury

Physical characteristics
- Source
  - location: Marhsall Township
  - coordinates: 47°58′10″N 83°26′43″W
  - elevation: 470 m (1,540 ft)
- Mouth: Schewabik Lake, Chapleau River
  - location: Copperfield Township
  - coordinates: 48°13′49″N 83°10′34″W
  - elevation: 349 m (1,145 ft)

Basin features
- River system: James Bay drainage basin
- Tributaries
  - right: Little Swanson River

The Swanson River is a river in Sudbury District in northeastern Ontario, Canada. It is in the James Bay drainage basin, begins south of Mageau Lake and is a left tributary of the Chapleau River.

== Course ==
The river begins in geographic Marshall Township, and flows north to Mageau Lake, where it enters geographic Mageau Township. It heads northeast into geographic Manning Township, continues northeast into geographic Floranna Township followed by geographic Sadler Township. It enters geographic Lipsett Township, takes in the right tributary Little Swanson River, heads east into geographic Copperfield Township, and reaches its mouth at Schewabik Lake on the Chapleau River. The Chapleau River flows via the Kapuskasing River, the Mattagami River and the Moose River to James Bay.

== Tributaries ==
- Little Swanson River (right)

== Sources ==
- Map 14 (PDF) (Map). 1 : 1,600,000. Official road map of Ontario. Ministry of Transportation of Ontario. 2010-01-01.
- Restructured municipalities - Ontario map #3 (Map). Restructuring Maps of Ontario. Ontario Ministry of Municipal Affairs and Housing. 2006.
