= Little Saganash River =

- Location of the mouth of the Little Saganash River in Ontario

Location
- Country: Canada
- Province: Ontario
- Region: Northeastern Ontario
- District: Cochrane

Physical characteristics
- Source: Unnamed lake
  - location: Casselman Township
  - coordinates: 49°05′01″N 82°25′54″W
  - elevation: 278 m (912 ft)
- Mouth: Saganash River
  - location: Sulman Township
  - coordinates: 49°13′14″N 82°30′36″W
  - elevation: 222 m (728 ft)

Basin features
- River system: James Bay drainage basin

The Little Saganash River is a river in Cochrane District in northeastern Ontario, Canada. It is in the James Bay drainage basin, and is a right tributary of the Saganash River.

== Course ==
The river begins at a small, unnamed lake in geographic Casselman Township, between Swanson Road and Chain of Lakes Road. It flows northwest into geographic Staples Township, turns north then again northwest. The river flows into geographic Sulman Township, and reaches its mouth at the Saganash River. The Saganash River flows via the Kapuskasing River, the Mattagami River and the Moose River to James Bay.

== Sources ==
- Map 14 (PDF) (Map). 1 : 1,600,000. Official road map of Ontario. Ministry of Transportation of Ontario. 2010-01-01.
- Restructured municipalities - Ontario map #3 (Map). Restructuring Maps of Ontario. Ontario Ministry of Municipal Affairs and Housing. 2006.
