= Ivanhoe (disambiguation) =

Ivanhoe is an 1820 novel by Sir Walter Scott.

Ivanhoe may also refer to:

== Films ==
- Ivanhoe (1913 British film)
- Ivanhoe (1913 American film), an IMP/Universal silent film starring King Baggot
- Ivanhoe (1952 film), an MGM film starring Robert Taylor
- Ivanhoe (1982 film), a TV movie starring Anthony Andrews
- Ivanhoe, a 1986 animated film produced by Burbank Films Australia

== TV series ==
- Ivanhoe (1958 TV series), featuring Roger Moore
- Ivanhoe (1970 TV series), starring Eric Flynn
- Ivanhoe (1997 TV series), starring Steven Waddington

== Operas ==
- Ivanhoé, an 1826 pastiche opera with music by Gioachino Rossini
- Ivanhoe (opera), by Arthur Sullivan (1891)

== Places ==
=== Australia ===
- Ivanhoe, Victoria, Melbourne Region, a suburb
  - Electoral district of Ivanhoe (Victoria), a current electorate in the Victorian Legislative Assembly
  - Ivanhoe railway station, Melbourne
- Ivanhoe, New South Wales, Far West Region
  - Ivanhoe (Warakirri) Correctional Centre, a minimum security prison
- Electoral district of Ivanhoe (Western Australia), an abolished electorate in the Western Australian Legislative Assembly
- Ivanhoe Station, a pastoral station in Western Australia

=== Canada ===
- Ivanhoe, Newfoundland and Labrador, a former settlement
- Ivanhoe, a community in Centre Hastings, Ontario
- Ivanhoe Lake, Ontario
- Ivanhoe River, Ontario

=== United States ===
- Ivanhoe, California, a census-designated place
- Ivanhoe, Georgia, an unincorporated community
- Ivanhoe, Illinois, an unincorporated community
- Ivanhoe, Gary, Indiana, a neighborhood infamous for its housing project
- Ivanhoe, Iowa, a village
- Ivanhoe, an unincorporated community in Sheridan Township, Huron County, Michigan
- Ivanhoe, Minnesota, a city
- Ivanhoe, North Carolina, a census-designated place
- Ivanhoe, Fannin County, Texas, an unincorporated community
- Ivanhoe, Tyler County, Texas, a city
- Ivanhoe, Virginia, a census-designated place
- Ivanhoe mining district, Elko County, Nevada
- Lake Ivanhoe (New Hampshire)
- Ivanhoe Reservoir, part of the Silver Lake Reservoir in Los Angeles, California

== Schools ==
- Ivanhoe School, a secondary school in Ashby-de-la-Zouch, Leicestershire, England
- Ivanhoe Girls' Grammar School, an independent Anglican school for girls in Ivanhoe, Victoria, Australia
- Ivanhoe Grammar School, an independent co-educational Anglican school in Ivanhoe, Victoria, Australia

== People ==
- Ivan Barrow (1911–1979), cricketer for the West Indies
- Vincent "Ivanhoe" Martin (1924–1948), Jamaican outlaw and folk hero who is also known as Rhyging
  - Ivanhoe "Ivan" Martin, fictional protagonist of the 1972 film The Harder They Come; based on Vincent "Ivanhoe" Martin
- Philip J. Ivanhoe (born 1954), leading scholar of Chinese philosophy

== Businesses ==
- Ivanhoe Bus Company, a bus and coach operator in Melbourne, Victoria, Australia
- Ivanhoe's Restaurant, a drive-in ice cream stand and family owned restaurant in Upland, Indiana, United States
- Ivanhoe Mines, former name of Turquoise Hill Resources, a Canadian mineral exploration and development company

== Rail transportation ==
- Ivanhoe Line, a railway line in England
- Ivanhoe station (Illinois), a commuter rail station in Riverdale, Illinois
- Ivanhoe railway station, Melbourne, a railway station in Melbourne, Victoria, Australia
- Ivanhoe railway station, New South Wales, a railway station in Ivanhoe, New South Wales, Australia

== Other uses ==
- HMS Ivanhoe, two Royal Navy destroyers
- PS Ivanhoe, a paddle steamer launched in 1880
- Ivanhoe Masonic Temple, Kansas City, Missouri, formerly on the National Register of Historic Places, demolished in 1999
- IVANHOE (software), an educational game

== See also ==
- Ivanhoe East, Victoria, Melbourne Region
- Ivanhoe Estates, Florida, a census-designated place
- Ivanhoé Cambridge, a Montreal-based real estate firm
- Ivanoe Bonomi (1873–1951), Prime Minister of Italy
- Ivinghoe, a village and civil parish in England
