= Makonie River =

- Location of the mouth of the Makonie River in Ontario

Location
- Country: Canada
- Province: Ontario
- Region: Northeastern Ontario
- District: Sudbury

Physical characteristics
- Source
  - location: Manning Township
  - coordinates: 48°07′56″N 83°25′22″W
  - elevation: 442 m (1,450 ft)
- Mouth: Chapleau River
  - location: Bonar Township
  - coordinates: 48°23′37″N 83°00′17″W
  - elevation: 320 m (1,050 ft)

Basin features
- River system: James Bay drainage basin

The Makonie River is a river in Sudbury District in northeastern Ontario, Canada. It is in the James Bay drainage basin, and is a left tributary of the Chapleau River.

== Course ==
The river begins in geographic Manning Township and flows northeast, passes northeast through the southeast corner of geographic Brutus Township, enters geographic Lipsett Township, and empties into Lipsett Lake. The river goes north and enters geographic Lloyd Township, heads northeast, and reaches Makonie Lake. The river flows east, enters geographic Bonar Township, heads northeast to Bonar Lake, then continues northeast and reaches its mouth at the Chapleau River. The Chapleau River flows via the Kapuskasing River, the Mattagami River and the Moose River to James Bay.

== Tributaries ==
- Stefansson Creek (left)
- Kakanakwa Creek (left)

== Sources ==
- Map 14 (PDF) (Map). 1 : 1,600,000. Official road map of Ontario. Ministry of Transportation of Ontario. 2010-01-01.
- Restructured municipalities - Ontario map #3 (Map). Restructuring Maps of Ontario. Ontario Ministry of Municipal Affairs and Housing. 2006. Archived from the original on 2014-04-10.
