= Borden River =

- Location of the mouth of the Borden River in Ontario

Location
- Country: Canada
- Province: Ontario
- Region: Northeastern Ontario
- District: Sudbury

Physical characteristics
- Source: Borden Lake
  - location: Cochrane Township
  - coordinates: 47°52′25″N 83°16′49″W
  - elevation: 428 m (1,404 ft)
- Mouth: Nemegosenda Lake on the Nemegosenda River
  - location: Chewett Township
  - coordinates: 47°57′53″N 83°06′14″W
  - elevation: 333 m (1,093 ft)

Basin features
- River system: James Bay drainage basin

The Borden River is a river in Sudbury District in northeastern Ontario, Canada. It is in the James Bay drainage basin, and is a left tributary of the Nemegosenda River.

== Course ==
The river begins at the northwest bay of Borden Lake in geographic Cochrane Township, and flows north under Ontario Highway 101. It heads northeast, then east, enters geographic Borden Township, and takes in the left tributary Briggs Creek. The heads southeast, takes in the right tributary Westover Creek, then flows northeast through the Mate Lakes where it enters geographic McGee Township. It briefly flows northeast through the southeast corner of the township, continues northeast into geographic Chewett Township, then turns northwest and reaches its mouth at the southern tip of Nemegosenda Lake. Nemegosenda Lake flows via the Nemegosenda River, the Kapuskasing River, the Mattagami River and the Moose River to James Bay.

== Tributaries ==
- Westover Creek (right)
- Briggs Creek (left)

== Sources ==
- Map 14 (PDF) (Map). 1 : 1,600,000. Official road map of Ontario. Ministry of Transportation of Ontario. 2010-01-01.
- Restructured municipalities - Ontario map #3 (Map). Restructuring Maps of Ontario. Ontario Ministry of Municipal Affairs and Housing. 2006. Archived from the original on 2014-04-10.
