= Saganash River =

Saganash River Rivière Saganash
- Location of the mouth of the Saganash River in Ontario

Location
- Country: Canada
- Province: Ontario
- Region: Northeastern Ontario
- District: Cochrane

Physical characteristics
- Source: Saganash Lake
  - location: Staples Township
  - coordinates: 49°05′35″N 82°34′39″W
  - elevation: 251 m (823 ft)
- Mouth: Kapuskasing River
  - location: O'Brien Township / Kapuskasing
  - coordinates: 49°21′50″N 82°28′09″W
  - elevation: 212 m (696 ft)

Basin features
- River system: James Bay drainage basin
- Tributaries
  - right: Little Saganash River

The Saganash River (Official name in French: Rivière Saganash) is a river in Cochrane District in northeastern Ontario, Canada. It is in the James Bay drainage basin, and is a right tributary of the Kapuskasing River.

== Course ==
The river begins at the north end of Saganash Lake in geographic Staples Township, and flows north, takes in the right tributary Staples Creek, and enters geographic Sulman Township. It turns northeast, takes in the right tributary Little Saganash River, and passes through the northwest corner of geographic Swanson Township into geographic O'Brien Township. The final 1,350 metres (4,430 ft) middle of the river forms the border between O'Brien Township and the Town of Kapuskasing, after which the river reaches its mouth at the Kapuskasing River. The Kapuskasing River flows via the Mattagami River and the Moose River to James Bay.

== Tributaries ==
- Hennessy Creek (right)
- Wabicock Creek (right)
- Grass Creek (right)
- Young Creek (right)
- Little Saganash River (right)
- Staples Creek (right)

== Sources ==
- Map 14 (PDF) (Map). 1 : 1,600,000. Official road map of Ontario. Ministry of Transportation of Ontario. 2010-01-01.
- Restructured municipalities - Ontario map #3 (Map). Restructuring Maps of Ontario. Ontario Ministry of Municipal Affairs and Housing. 2006. Archived from the original on 2014-04-10.
