= Ivanhoe Lake =

Lake in Ontario, Canada

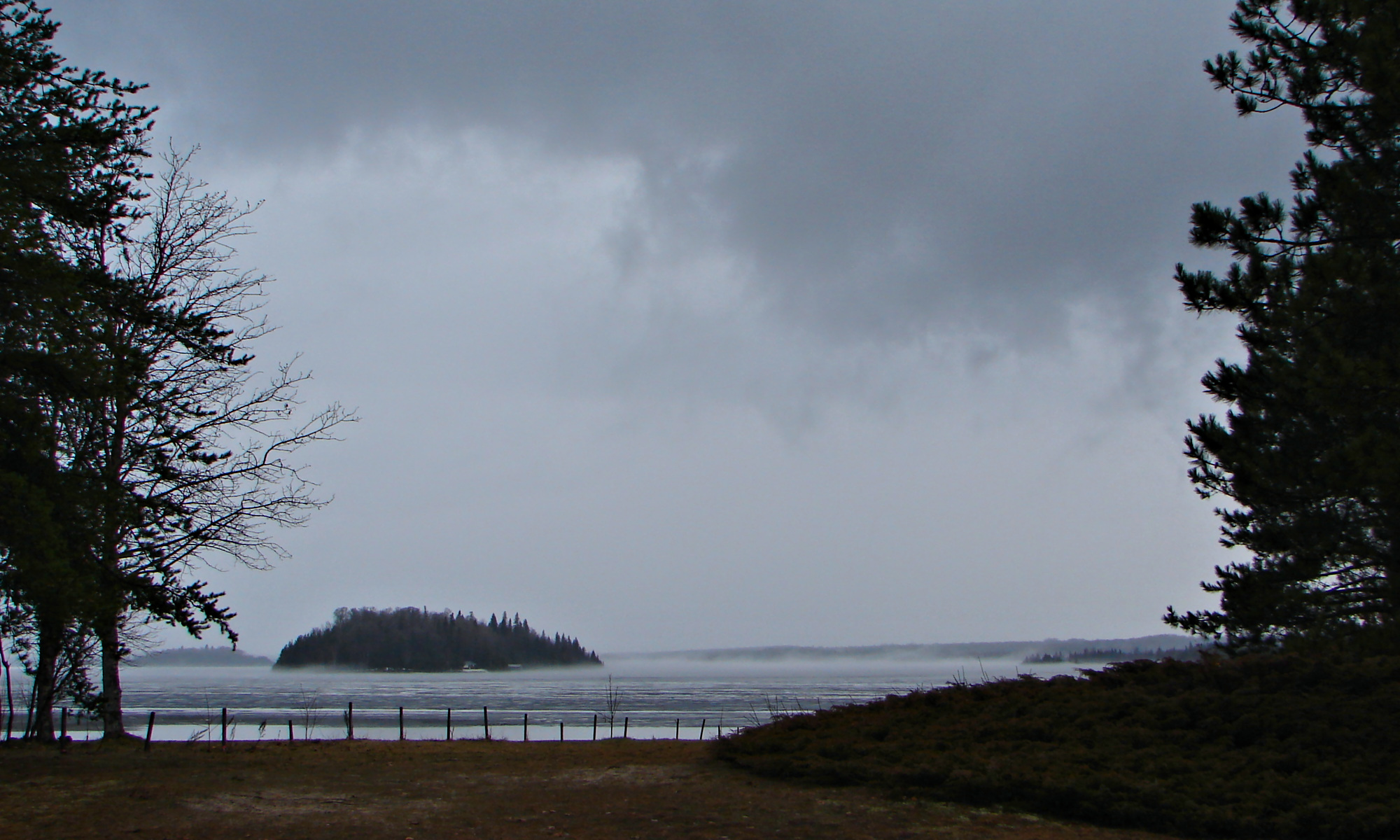

- Location of Ivanhoe Lake in Ontario
- Location: Sudbury District, Ontario
- Coordinates: 48°04′58″N 82°37′36″W
- Primary inflows: Ivanhoe River
- Primary outflows: Ivanhoe River
- Basin countries: Canada
- Max. length: 25 km (16 mi)
- Surface elevation: 340 m (1,120 ft)
- Islands: First island, Second island, Hinton Island, and Klose Island

Ivanhoe Lake is a 25-kilometre (16 mi) long, narrow lake in the Unorganized North Part of Sudbury District in Northeastern Ontario, Canada. It is on the Ivanhoe River in the James Bay drainage basin and is located 8 kilometres (5 mi) southwest of Foleyet on Ontario Highway 101. The lake is substantially encompassed by Ivanhoe Lake Provincial Park, except for some private cottages at the northeast end of the lake. The lake is known as Pishkanogami in the Anishinaabe language, and was once the site of Pishkanogami Post, a Hudson's Bay Company trading post. It was renamed Ivanhoe Lake in 1960.

== Hydrology ==
There are four islands in the lake: First island, Second island, Hinton Island, and Klose Island; and one shoal, Hastle Shoal, located 500 metres (1,640 ft) northeast of Second Island).

The primary inflow is the Ivanhoe River at the southwest tip of the lake; other named inflows are (left and right tributaries vis-à-vis the Ivanhoe River inflow and outflow) Jackpine Creek (left), Hellyer Creek (left) and Gullystone Creek (right). The primary outflow is the Ivanhoe River (New Channel) at the northeast of the lake, controlled by the Ontario Ministry of Natural Resources-operated Ivanhoe Lake Dam, a barrage dam to regulate the water level on the lake and headwaters storage for hydroelectric generating stations further downstream in the drainage basin. A secondary outflow is the Ivanhoe River (Old Channel) at the northwest of the lake. Both channels recombine further downstream as the Ivanhoe River, which flows via the Groundhog River, Mattagami River and Moose River to James Bay. The lake is known for its very large sandy shoal beach along the east side of the lake at Ivanhoe Lake Provincial Park. The shoal beach was created by erosion since the lake level was reduced when the esker washed out in 1918. Due to the large shallow area the water temperature at the beach can be very comfortable during summer months.

== Transportation ==
The lake can be accessed by road from Highway 101, and private floatplane services are offered by Air Ivanhoe from their main base on the lake. Marine fuel and boat rentals are available from Red Pine Wilderness Lodge. There are three boat launches available on the lake. The first is a public launch accessible of the main Ivanhoe Lake road roughly 1 km from Hwy 101. The public launch is constructed of gravel and sand and it is not completely level. It is suitable for launching and loading small boats but large boats can be difficult to load and level. The second launch is a paid launch at Redpine Lodge. The launch is constructed of concrete, is level, and suitable for all sizes of boats. The third launch is a gravel launch available inside Ivanhoe Lake Provincial Park. There is also an air strip between the northwest tip of the lake and Highway 101. The Ivanhoe Airstrip was built in the 1960s by a local lodge owner was used actively by general aviation aircraft through the 1980s. The MNR has also used the airstrip for aerial spraying in the 1990s, but that airstrip has never been maintained by the MNR. The airstrip is not formally maintained and must be used at a pilot's own risk.
