= Shawmere River =

- Location of the mouth of the Shawmere River in Ontario

Location
- Country: Canada
- Province: Ontario
- Region: Northeastern Ontario
- District: Sudbury

Physical characteristics
- Source: Unnamed lake
  - location: Gamey Township
  - coordinates: 47°53′29″N 82°59′44″W
  - elevation: 440 m (1,440 ft)
- Mouth: Ivanhoe River
  - location: Oates Township
  - coordinates: 48°20′23″N 82°28′38″W
  - elevation: 294 m (965 ft)

Basin features
- River system: James Bay drainage basin
- Tributaries
  - left: Little Shawmere River

The Shawmere River is a river in Sudbury District in northeastern Ontario, Canada. It is in the James Bay drainage basin, and is a left tributary of the Ivanhoe River.

== Course ==
The river begins at a small, unnamed lake in geographic Gamey Township, and flows north to Yohannson Lake, where it enters geographic Crockett Township. It flows briefly through the northwest corner of the township and enters geographic Sandy Township, continuing its northeast course under Ontario Highway 101. It heads north into geographic Murdock Township into Renée Lake, on the border of geographic Paul Township to the west and geographic Warren Township to the east. The river heads north out the lake on the Paul Township side, takes in the left tributary Little Shawmere River, then turns northeast back into Warren Township and continues northeast into geographic Lemoine Township. It flows into Lemoine Lake where it takes in the right tributary Carty Creek, then into Shawmere Lake where it takes in the left tributaries Lincoln Creek and Mishionga Creek. It passes northeast through the northwestern tip of geographic Folyet Township, and enters geographic Oates Township. It passes under the Canadian National Railway transcontinental railway main line, at that point passed but not served by Via Rail transcontinental Canadian trains, at the railway point of Shawmere, and reaches its mouth at the Ivanhoe River. The Ivanhoe River flows via the Groundhog River, the Mattagami River and the Moose River to James Bay.

== Tributaries ==
- Mishionga Creek (left)
- Lincoln Creek (left)
- Carty Creek (right)
- Little Shawmere River (left)

== Sources ==
- Map 14 (PDF) (Map). 1 : 1,600,000. Official road map of Ontario. Ministry of Transportation of Ontario. 2010-01-01.
- Restructured municipalities - Ontario map #3 (Map). Restructuring Maps of Ontario. Ontario Ministry of Municipal Affairs and Housing. 2006. Archived from the original on 2014-04-10.
