= Dunrankin River =

- Location of the mouth of the Dunrankin River in Ontario

Location
- Country: Canada
- Province: Ontario
- Region: Northeastern Ontario
- Districts: Algoma; Sudbury

Physical characteristics
- Source: Upper Dunrankin Lake
  - location: Lloyd Township, Sudbury District
  - coordinates: 48°24′45″N 83°12′29″W
  - elevation: 349 m (1,145 ft)
- Mouth: Kapuskasing River
  - location: Clouston Township, Algoma District
  - coordinates: 48°46′40″N 82°51′06″W
  - elevation: 259 m (850 ft)

Basin features
- River system: James Bay drainage basin
- Tributaries
  - right: East Dunrankin River, Kirkwall River

The Dunrankin River is a river in Algoma District and Sudbury District in northeastern Ontario, Canada. It is in the James Bay drainage basin, begins at Upper Dunrankin Lake and is a left tributary of the Kapuskasing River.

== Course ==
The river begins at the northeast end of Upper Dunrankin Lake in geographic Lloyd Township, in the Unorganized North Part of Sudbury District, leaving the lake at the northeast and heading north into geographic Kirkwall Township, in the Unorganized North Part of Algoma District, to Dunrankin Lake. It heads north from the lake, loops briefly west through geographic Lerwick Township, heads northeast to take in the right tributary Kirkwall River, then continues northeast to the railway point of Dunrankin on the Canadian National Railway transcontinental railway main line, completed in 1915 as the Canadian Northern Railway, passed but not served by Via Rail transcontinental Canadian trains. The river passes northeast under the line, enters geographic Stefansson Township, and takes in the right tributary East Dunrankin River. It continues northeast, splits over a series of rapids, enters geographic Amundsen Township, heads northeast into geographic Clouston Township, then turns east and reaches its mouth at the Kapuskasing River. The Kapuskasing River flows via the Mattagami River and the Moose River to James Bay.

== Tributaries ==
- East Dunrankin River (right)
- Kirkwall River (right)
