= Missonga, Ontario =

Missonga
- Railway point
- Location in Ontario
- Coordinates: 48°23′16″N 82°41′26″W
- Country: Canada
- Province: Ontario
- District: Sudbury
- Established: 1913
- Elevation: 356 m (1,168 ft)
- Time zone: UTC-5 (Eastern Time Zone)
  - Summer (DST): UTC-4 (Eastern Time Zone)
- Postal Code FSA: P0M

Missonga is an unincorporated place and railway point in geographic Shenango Township, in the Unorganized North part of Sudbury District in northeastern Ontario, Canada. It is on the Canadian National Railway transcontinental railway main line between the railway point of Oatland to the west and the dispersed rural community of Shawmere to the east, has a railway siding, and is passed but not served by Via Rail transcontinental Canadian trains. Missonga is on Shenango Lake, at a point where Mishionga Creek leaves the lake; Mishionga Creek is a left tributary of the Shawmere River.

== History ==
Missonga is on part of a section of what was originally the Canadian Northern Railway that was under construction from 1912 to 1913.
