= Oatlands =

Oatlands may refer to the following places:

== Australia ==
- Oatlands, New South Wales, a suburb of Sydney
- Oatlands, Tasmania
- Oatlands Primary School, Narre Warren, Victoria

== Ireland ==
- Oatlands College

== United Kingdom ==
- Oatlands, Glasgow, Scotland
- Oatlands, North Yorkshire, England
- Oatlands, Surrey, England
  - Oatlands Palace, former palace at Oatlands, Surrey
- Oatlands railway station, Cumbria, England

== United States ==
- Oatlands Plantation, Leesburg, Virginia

== See also ==
- Oatland, Ontario, Canada
