= Chapleau River =

- Location of the mouth of the Chapleau River in Ontario
- Etymology: Named for Joseph-Adolphe Chapleau

Location
- Country: Canada
- Province: Ontario
- Region: Northeastern Ontario
- Districts: Algoma; Sudbury

Physical characteristics
- Source: Chapleau Lake
  - location: Sudbury District
  - coordinates: 47°53′11″N 83°21′13″W
  - elevation: 427 m (1,401 ft)
- Mouth: Kapuskasing River
  - location: Kapuskasing Township, Algoma District
  - coordinates: 48°28′23″N 82°57′38″W
  - elevation: 312 m (1,024 ft)

Basin features
- River system: James Bay drainage basin
- Tributaries
  - left: Makonie River, Swanson River

The Chapleau River is a river in Algoma District and Sudbury District in northeastern Ontario, Canada. It is in the James Bay drainage basin, begins at Chapleau Lake and is the main tributary of Kapuskasing Lake.

== Etymology ==
The community of Chapleau was created as a divisional point during the construction of the Canadian Pacific Railway Transcontinental railway and was named for Joseph-Adolphe Chapleau. Both the lake upon which the community is located and the river which flows from the lake took on the same name.

== Course ==
The river begins at the north end of Chapleau Lake in Subury District, and flows north through Henderson Lake before taking in the left tributary Racine Creek. it continues north to Schewabik Lake where it takes in the left tributary Swanson River. It continues northeast, then north, takes in the left tributary Makonie River, enters Algoma District, and reaches its mouth at Kapuskasing Lake. Kapuskasing Lake flows via the Kapuskasing River, the Mattagami River and the Moose River to James Bay.

== Recreation ==
Chapleau-Nemegosenda River Provincial Park is a waterway park operated by Ontario Parks that includes the Chapleau River from the entry of the tributary Racine Creek to the river mouth at Kapuskasing Lake.

== Tributaries ==
- Makonie River (left)
- Copperfield Creek (right)
- Swanson River (left)
- Adams Creek (right)
- Racine Creek (left)
- Chapleau Lake
  - Kebsquasheshing River

== Sources ==
- Map 14 (PDF) (Map). 1 : 1,600,000. Official road map of Ontario. Ministry of Transportation of Ontario. 2010-01-01.
- Restructured municipalities - Ontario map #3 (Map). Restructuring Maps of Ontario. Ontario Ministry of Municipal Affairs and Housing. 2006. Archived from the original on 2014-04-10.
