= Elsas station =

Railway station in Ontario, Canada

Elsas

General information
- Location: Elsas, ON; Canada
- Coordinates: 48°31′18″N 82°54′16″W
- Owner: Via Rail

Construction
- Structure type: Sign post

History
- Opened: 1915
- Former names: Canadian National Railway

Services
| Preceding station | Via Rail | Following station |
|---|---|---|
| Oba toward Vancouver | The Canadian | Foleyet toward Toronto |
Former services
| Preceding station | Canadian National Railway | Following station |
|---|---|---|
| Agate toward Vancouver | Main Line | Oatland toward Montreal |
Location
- Location within Ontario

Elsas railway station is a railway station in the community of Elsas in the Unorganized North part of Algoma District in northeastern Ontario, Canada. The station is on the Canadian National Railway transcontinental railway main line between the railway points of Agate to the west and Oatland to the east, and is a stop for Via Rail transcontinental Canadian trains. The station and settlement are on the northern shore of Kapuskasing Lake, the source of the Kapuskasing River.

== History ==
This section of what was originally the Canadian Northern Railway (CNoR) was under construction from 1913 to 1915. The establishment of sawmills and other industries along the railway route was delayed until after World War 1. In 1920 the Continental Wood Products Corporation (CWPC) selected this site for the location of its mill. The closest passing track on the CNR was at Agate, 3 miles to the west. The station at this location was named for Herman Elsas, president of CWPC. The mill closed in 1928 when remaining timber berths were sold to Spruce Falls Paper and Power further down the Kaspuskasing River in the town of Kapuskasing.
