= Film adaptations of Ivanhoe =

The Ivanhoe films are based on the novel by Sir Walter Scott. The novel has been made into a film several times; starting with two adaptations in Ivanhoe (in the US and UK) in 1913.

In MGM's 1952 version of Ivanhoe, Robert Taylor and Elizabeth Taylor played Ivanhoe and Rebecca, while Joan Fontaine was Rowena. George Sanders also co-starred. The movie was produced in the grand MGM style in Technicolor, and was a great success.

In 1982 a made-for-television version, half an hour longer than the 1952 film, was made, starring Anthony Andrews as Ivanhoe. Other actors involved in this version were John Rhys-Davies and Sam Neill. Rebecca was played by Olivia Hussey, and James Mason played Isaac of York.

== 1997 Ivanhoe television mini-series ==
A&E TV Networks and BBC teamed up in 1997 to produce a TV mini-series based on Sir Walter Scott's classic, eponymous novel. The 5-hour series is directed by Stuart Orme with a screenplay written by Deborah Cook. The saga hosts a cast of many illustrious names from within the British acting community.

Steven Waddington stars as the hero, Sir Wilfred of Ivanhoe. He is a Saxon knight in the service of the lion-hearted Norman King Richard I (Rory Edwards) during the Holy Crusades. After successfully sacking the Muslim-held town of Acre, Richard and his company undertake a return journey to England. Whilst traveling through Austria, they are taken prisoner by the Arch-duke Leopold. It is within an Austrian dungeon that the series begins and the protagonist is introduced. Meanwhile, in his native England, Ivanhoe's reputation has become tainted with allegations of treason to his king. As a result, his father, Lord Cedric of Rotherwood (James Cosmo), has disowned him, and his land holdings have become forfeit to the Norman aristocracy.

Thus we find Sir Wilfred back in England thirteen months later, determined to clear his name and reclaim his life. He is assisted in his endeavors by Gurth (Trevor Cooper), Ivanhoe's one-time squire and Lord Cedric's swineherd, as well as Wamba (Jimmy Chisolm), Lord Cedric's nephew and resident fool. Also aiding Ivanhoe are the money-lender Isaac of York (David Horovitch) and his daughter Rebecca (Susan Lynch), a healer and wise-woman. Cameos are made by Robin Hood (Aden Gillett), Little John (David Nicholls), and Friar Tuck (Ron Donachie).

Ivanhoe's chief nemeses include Richard's devious brother Prince John of Anjou (Ralph Brown), and his Norman champions: Templar knight (and Ivanhoe's former Crusades compatriot) Sir Brian de Bois-Gilbert (Ciaran Hinds), Sir Maurice de Bracy (Valentine Pelka), and Sir Reginald Front de Boeuf (Nick Brimble). Rounding out the cast of antagonists are the zealous Templar Grand Master Lucas de Beauxmanois (Christopher Lee) and Prince John's Chancellor and master-politician Waldemar Fitzurse (Ronald Pickup).

The story features a dizzying array of intersecting plot-arcs, and coincidental meetings are abundant. Among the conflicts that Ivanhoe faces is the betrothal of his childhood sweetheart (and ward of Lord Cedric) Rowena ((Victoria Smurfit) to Lord Aethelstane (Chris Walker), last of the royal Saxon line of Alfred the Great. Ivanhoe also must contend with de Bois-Gilbert's efforts to permanently prevent him from exposing de Bois-Gilbert as the true traitor to King Richard.

At the crossroads where love, loyalty, betrayal, kidnapping, murder, arson, intrigue, espionage, assassination, and warfare meet, there you'll find Ivanhoe.
