= Kapuskasing Lake =

Lake in northeastern Ontario, Canada

- Location in Ontario
- Location: Algoma District and Sudbury District, Ontario
- Coordinates: 48°29′01″N 82°56′40″W
- Part of: James Bay drainage basin
- Primary inflows: Chapleau River
- Primary outflows: Kapuskasing River
- Basin countries: Canada
- Max. length: 13 kilometres (8.1 mi)
- Max. width: 4 kilometres (2.5 mi)
- Surface elevation: 312 metres (1,024 ft)

Kapuskasing Lake is a lake in Algoma District and Sudbury District in northeastern Ontario, Canada. It is in the James Bay drainage basin and is the source of the Kapuskasing River. The majority of the lake is in geographic Kapuskasing Township, Algoma District, with just the southern tip in geographic Sherlock Township, Sudbury District.

The primary inflow at the southwest is the Chapleau River. The primary outflow is the Kapuskasing River at the northeast, of which the lake is the source. The Kapuskasing River flows via the Mattagami River and the Moose River to James Bay.

The settlement of Elsas is at the northern end of the lake, and the railway point of Agate is just northwest of the lake. Both settlements are on the Canadian National Railway transcontinental railway main line, completed in 1915 as the Canadian Northern Railway, which follows the northern shore of the lake. The line is served by Via Rail transcontinental Canadian trains which stop at Elsas railway station.

== See also ==
- List of lakes in Ontario
