= La Ronde Cultural Center =

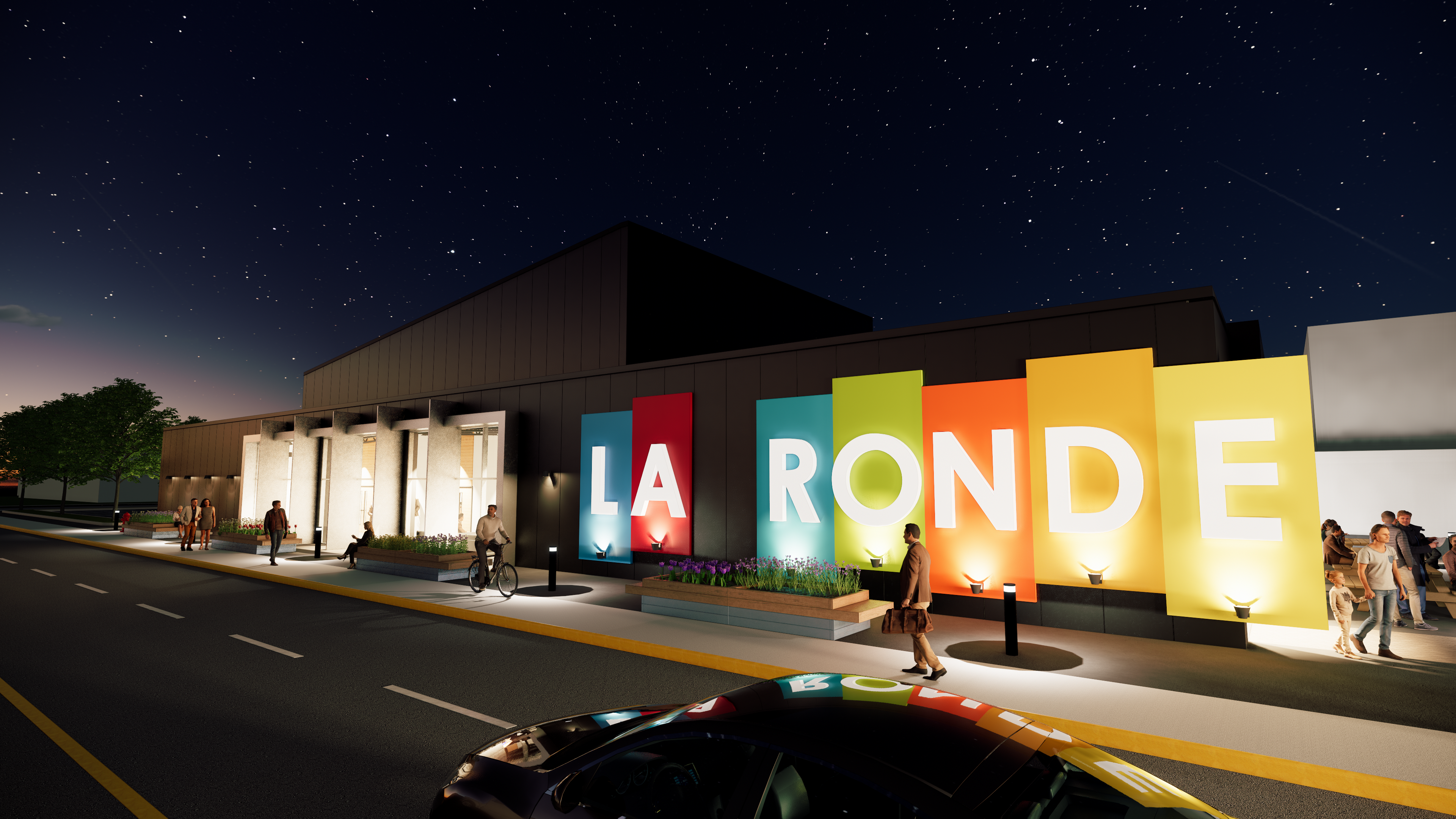
- Fig.1 Street view at night.
- Alternative names: Le Centre Culturel La Ronde

General information
- Status: Open to public
- Type: French Cultural Center
- Architectural style: Modern
- Location: Timmins, Ontario, Corner or Mountjoy Street North and Algonquin, Canada
- Current tenants: Francophone Community of Timmins
- Groundbreaking: October 2021
- Construction started: 2022
- Opened: November 27, 2023
- Cost: $7 Million
- Client: La Ronde

Technical details
- Structural system: Steel-framing
- Floor count: 1
- Floor area: 9,700 sq. ft

Design and construction
- Architect: Richard Yallowega
- Architecture firm: Yallowega Architecture Inc,
- Main contractor: A3 Construction Inc.

Other information
- Seating type: Folding chairs, Accessible seating
- Seating capacity: 300
- Number of bars: 1, L'Armise

Website
- https://www.larondetimmins.ca/

La Ronde Cultural Center (Le Centre Culturel La Ronde) is a building serving the Francophone community in the city of Timmins designed by Richard Yallowega of Yallowega Architecture Inc. Commissioned with the objective to reconstruct the French Cultural Center, it is intended to promote and preserve the Francophone culture and heritage within the Timmins region. It serves as a replacement for the cultural hub for the francophone population of Timmins that was previously destroyed in a fire in 2015 and demolished in 2017.

== Location ==
Located in central Timmins, Northern Ontario, Canada. Within the Mattagami Region Conservation Authority (MRCA) watershed area On the corner of Mountjoy Street that stretches from the North to South of Timmins. Perpendicular with the East and West division on Algonquin Blvd (Highway 101) that directly connects to Quebec due East and Wawa, upwards of Lake Superior on the West.

The building is located within walking distance of the historical Mattagami River and Mountjoy River.

== Community and cultural impact ==
=== Francophone community ===
La Ronde is designed for the Franco-Ontarians of Timmins. The city has 32.4% of French speakers among its population as of 2024. La Ronde is fully furnished and open to the public, serving as a gathering place for local Francophones to learn and celebrate their heritage and culture in Timmins.

=== Fundraising ===
Following a fire in 2015 which destroyed the previous centre, there were efforts throughout the 8-year intervening period to rebuild and restore La Ronde's presence in the community. By operating out of three different locations using both indoor and outdoor spaces for events and fundraising. From 2016-2022 the École Saint-Charles was used before the community was forced to move due to land sale. Additionally, the Kent Street location of Centre de santé de Timmins was utilized until 2022. In September 2022, the francophone community moved their activities into the Timmins Square Shopping Centre, where operations continued up until the opening on November 27, 2023.

In 2017, the organization's budget goal was set at an estimated 6.5 million dollars. The development of the new centre relied on community support. These efforts involved fundraising, community support, and contributions from various levels of government.

== Construction history ==
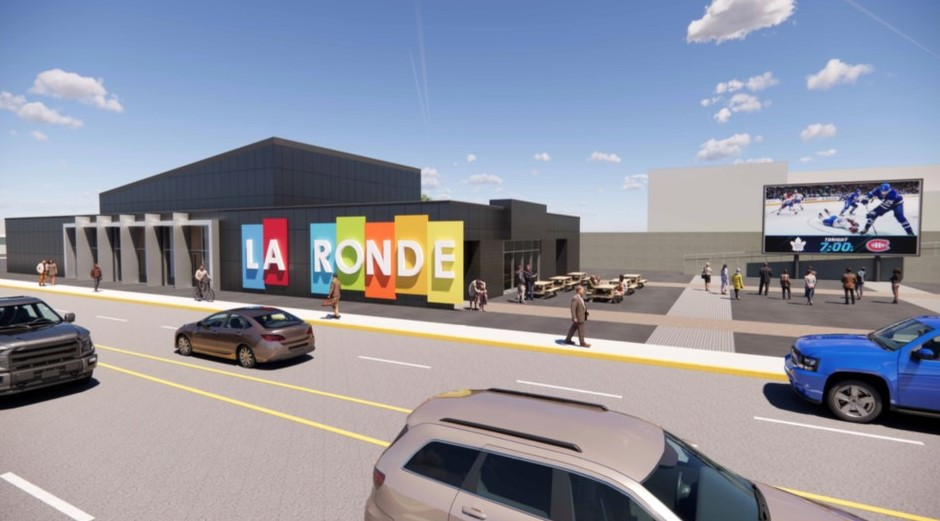
Fig.2 Street View Day - 2022

The construction process for La Ronde included considerable delays primarily due to funding. The project's funding complications resulted in an 8-year construction process since the 2015 fire. Construction commenced in October 2021 with the initial groundbreaking at the corner of Mountjoy St. and Algonquin Blvd. The construction was originally scheduled for 2020. Due to the pandemic inflation, the construction costs increased resulting in a year delay. On July 5, 2022, A3 Construction Inc. led La Ronde's construction continued to end in late November 2023. Throughout the construction process, local suppliers and labourers were used to keep the money within the community.

A number of adjustments in the design and construction of the building were made due to the budget of the project. These included moving the placement towards Algonquin Boulevard to avoid an area of poorer soil conditions. The structure is now entirely placed on the rock and the orientation was altered from the initial building placement. Furthermore, downsizing from the initial 11,000 square footage to the final size of 9,700 square feet. Multi-purpose spaces were incorporated as a means to remain within the building budget.

== Design and features ==
La Ronde Cultural Center assumes a rectangular steel-framed form with an overall 9,700 square footage. Composed of considerable sections to parallel the programming services offered. La Ronde offers a main hall, dance studio, a kitchen, a bar, a greenroom, a stage, event spaces, a lobby and offices. The single-storey structure is designed to be completely accessible to include its diverse clientele. Conceived to accommodate up to 300 guests with removable seating to embody the francophone community's attendance for events.

=== Design process ===
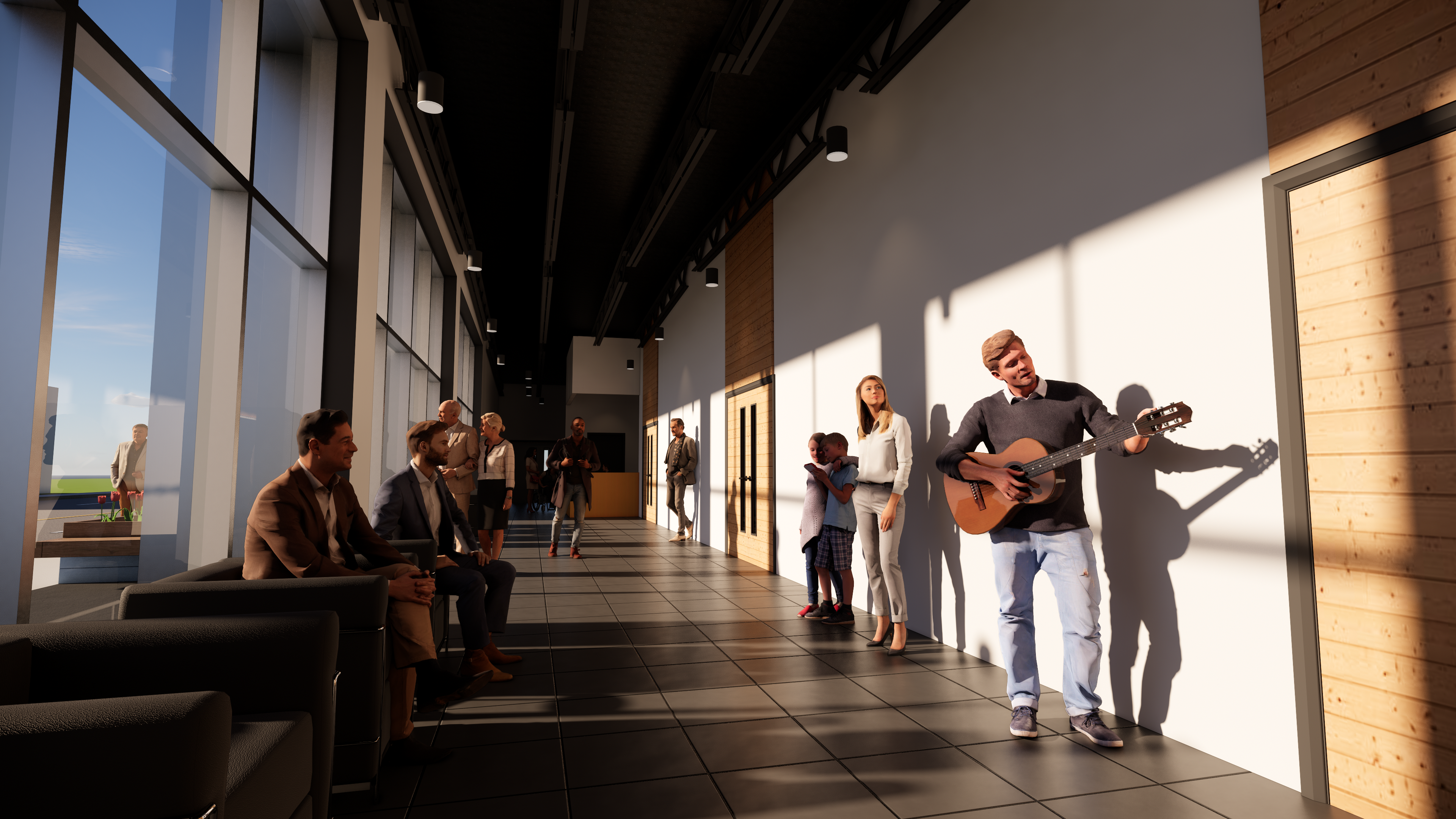
Fig.3 Hallway Overview - 2022

The design process commenced in 2021 derived from re-envisioning the street view using colorful signage. The building is inspired by its name and the 1969 Montreal's La Ronde. The final conceptual drawings made their first public impression at Sudbury's Collège Boréal gala on December 14, 2021. The design process included various community engagements, significantly making compromises based on the fully fundraised budget for the centre. Modifications such as replacing the initially designed colorful-glass facade with colorful signage were successful compromises.

=== Architecture ===
This building embodies the modern architectural style. Characteristics such as straight-lined forms, minimalistic detailing, multi-functional spaces and geometric shapes seen in the rectangular narrative continued throughout the building. The building predominantly uses a neutral color palette with dark grey cladding that encircles the building with periodic interruptions for dark grey brick outlining the entrances. The siding incorporates colorful blocks against the dark background with white lettering that completes the signage. The main street viewpoint contains floor-to-ceiling windows for daylighting surrounded by exterior extrusions for shading. The building sits at approximately 15' in height at its lowest point and is set back from the road to institute larger sidewalks.

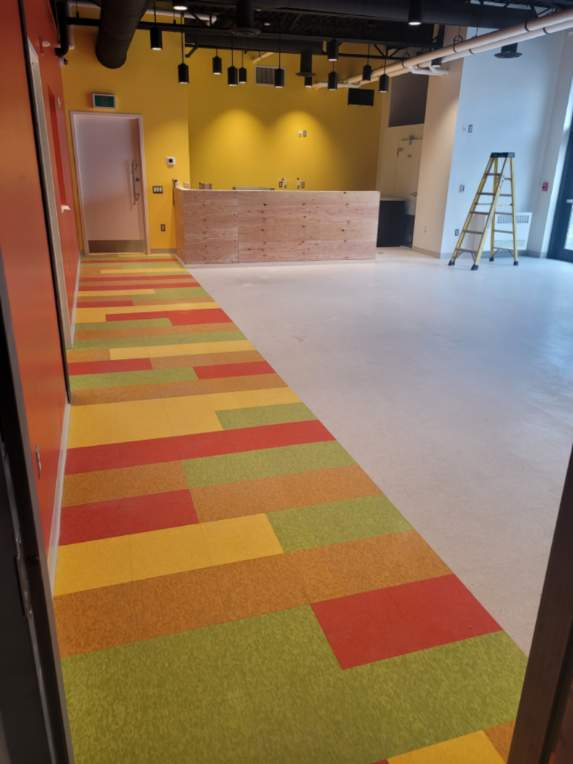
Fig.4 - Interior Color Scheme - 2022

=== Interior design ===
The interior of the building is composed of multicolored accents that mimic the exterior signage. The entryway includes a lime green counter and the bar uses a yellow backdrop, seating up to 70 people at a time. The interior flooring is primarily light-grey linoleum with accents dressed in arranged colorful squares that guide the main paths of walking traffic. Accent walls are red and yellow to illuminate the space, with black-painted high ceilings that expose the steel structure. Completed with large accessible doorways, dark grey wood furnishings and staggered countertops for guests of varying heights.

Behind the windows on the main facade is a straight hallway that continues off the entrance. The wider-than-normal hallway provides assorted seating and an unrestricted walkway. The white walls form a backdrop for various local art installations to be seen by the heavy flow of traffic. The main hall has a built-in stage with an attached green room. The ceiling contains pot lights against the black ceiling that mimic a starry night. The extruded roof allocates the high ceiling effect while enclosing the space to create a mezzanine for mechanical equipment. Square cutouts in the right wall connect the large event space to the kitchen. Providing a functioning way of serving food to visitors during events. The configuration accommodates the heavy capacity of people and functions for the various events the space was designed to harbor. The event spaces are easily manipulated to fulfil different event requirements. The use of multi-purpose spaces was a financial solution to remain within the budget. Components such as flexible seating through moveable chairs and tables were a budget compromise. The programmed spaces are open for rent to the public as a way to bring in revenue.

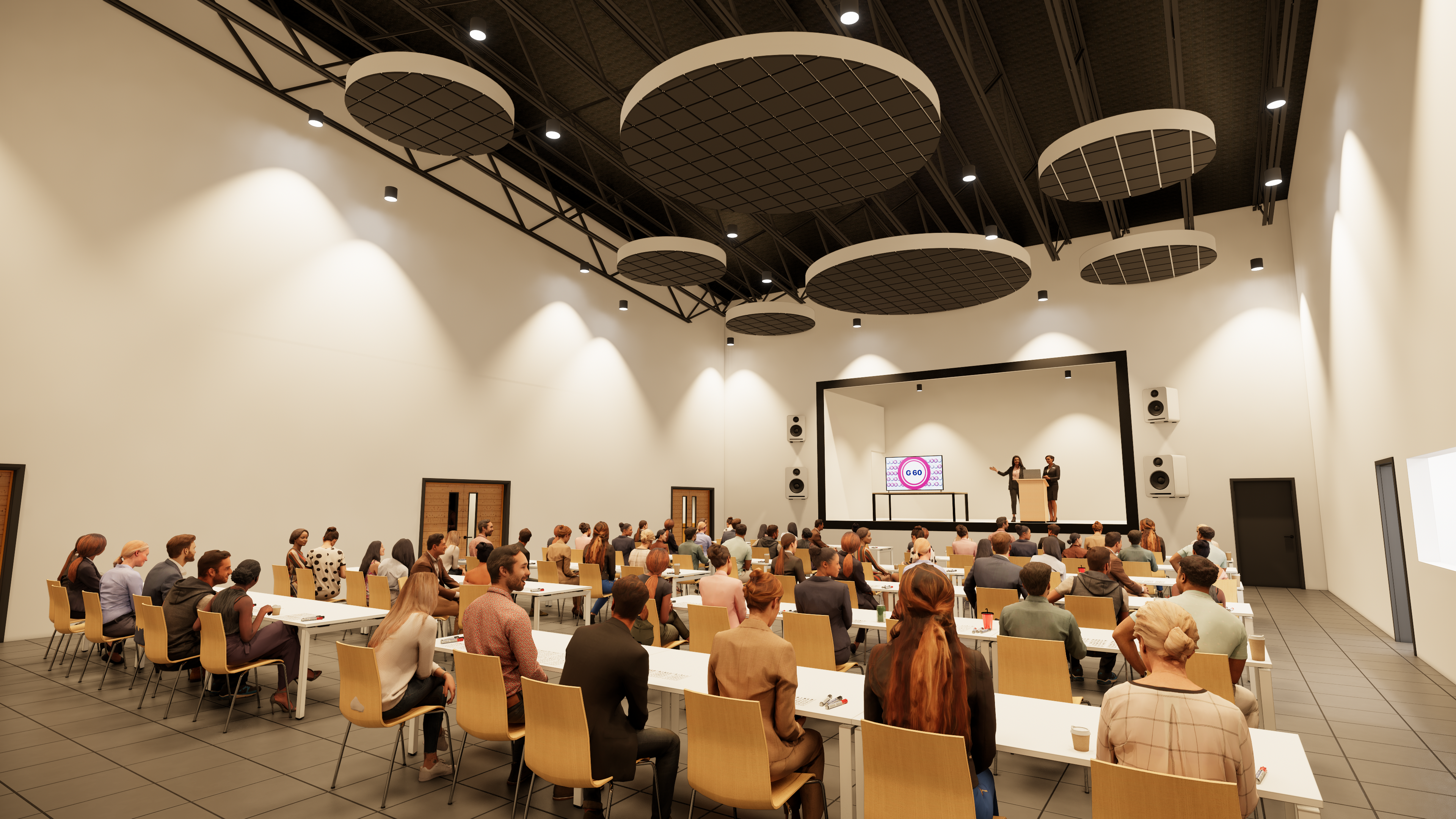
Fig.5 - Bingo Event in Gallery - 2022

== Program ==
The building's program offers a wide variety of cultural, artistic, social, and educational programs and events throughout the year. La Ronde includes activities, services and other programs designed to support and enrich the Francophone culture. It also serves as a gathering place for members of the community to connect and share their cultural heritage. La Ronde's programming is designed to be inclusive and diverse. Program elements range from infant to senior as well as free to paid programmed events listed below.

Programmed Events
Children	Youth	Adults	Seniors
Carnival; Childcare; Community breakfasts; Community celebrations; Community events; Cultural festivals; French-Canadian music; French language classes; Outdoor events; Recitals	Art lessons (oil painting and watercolours); Bingo; Cards; Carnival; Childcare; Community breakfasts; Community celebrations; Community events; Cultural festivals; Darts; French-Canadian music; French language classes; Outdoor events; Performances; Recitals; Teenage hangout spaces; Workshops; Yoga classes	Art lessons (oil painting and watercolours); Bar; Bingo; Cards; Carnival; Childcare; Community breakfasts; Community celebrations; Community events; Conferences; Cultural festivals; Darts; French-Canadian music; French language classes; New mothers' programs; Outdoor events; Performances; Recitals; Weddings; Workshops; Yoga classes	Art lessons (oil painting and watercolours); Bar; Bingo; Cards; Carnival; Community breakfasts; Community celebrations; Community events; Conferences; Cultural festivals; Darts; French-Canadian music; French language classes; Outdoor events; Performances; Recitals; Senior club nights; Workshops; Yoga classes

== Gallery ==
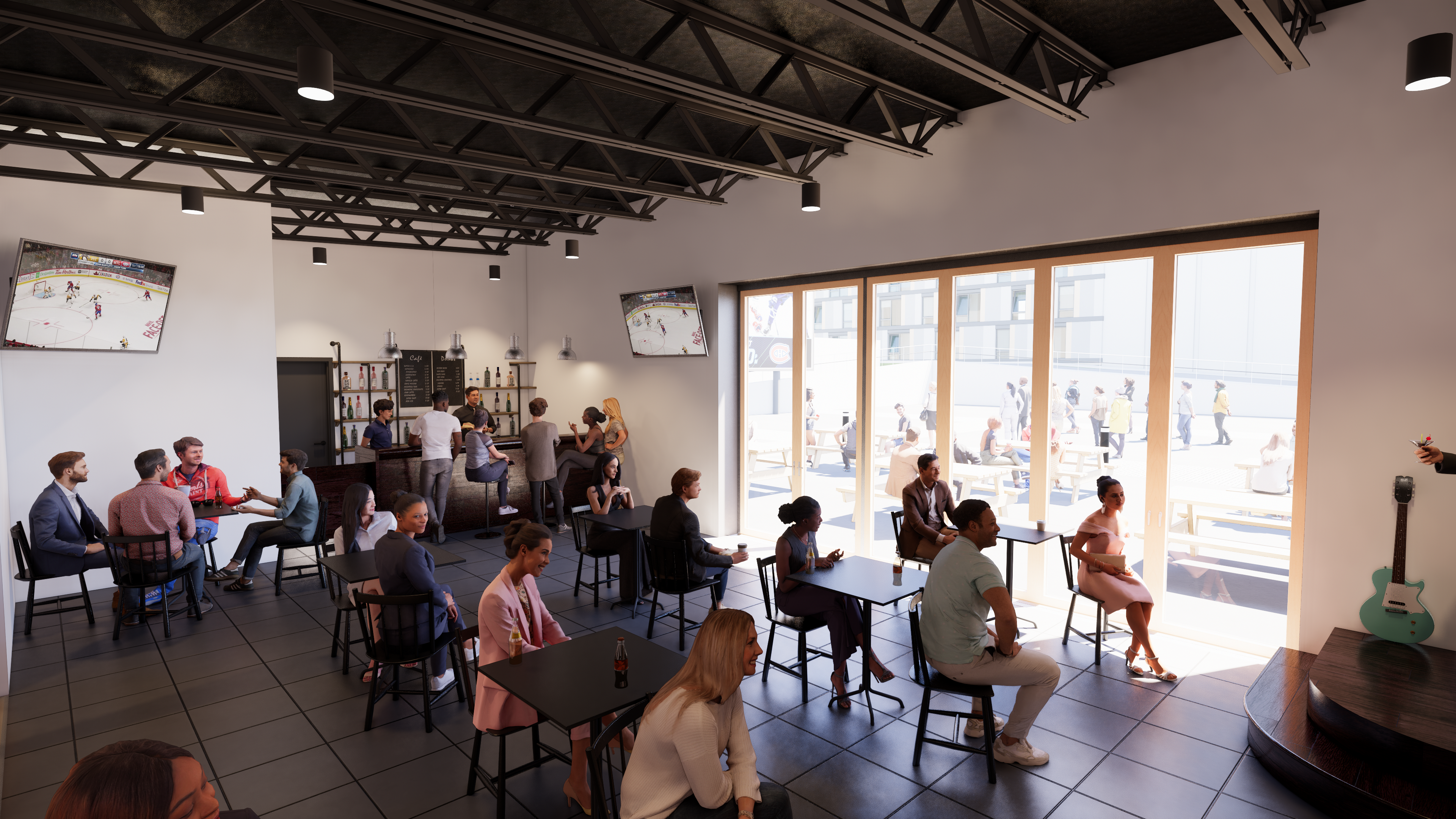
Fig.6 L'Armise Interior 2022

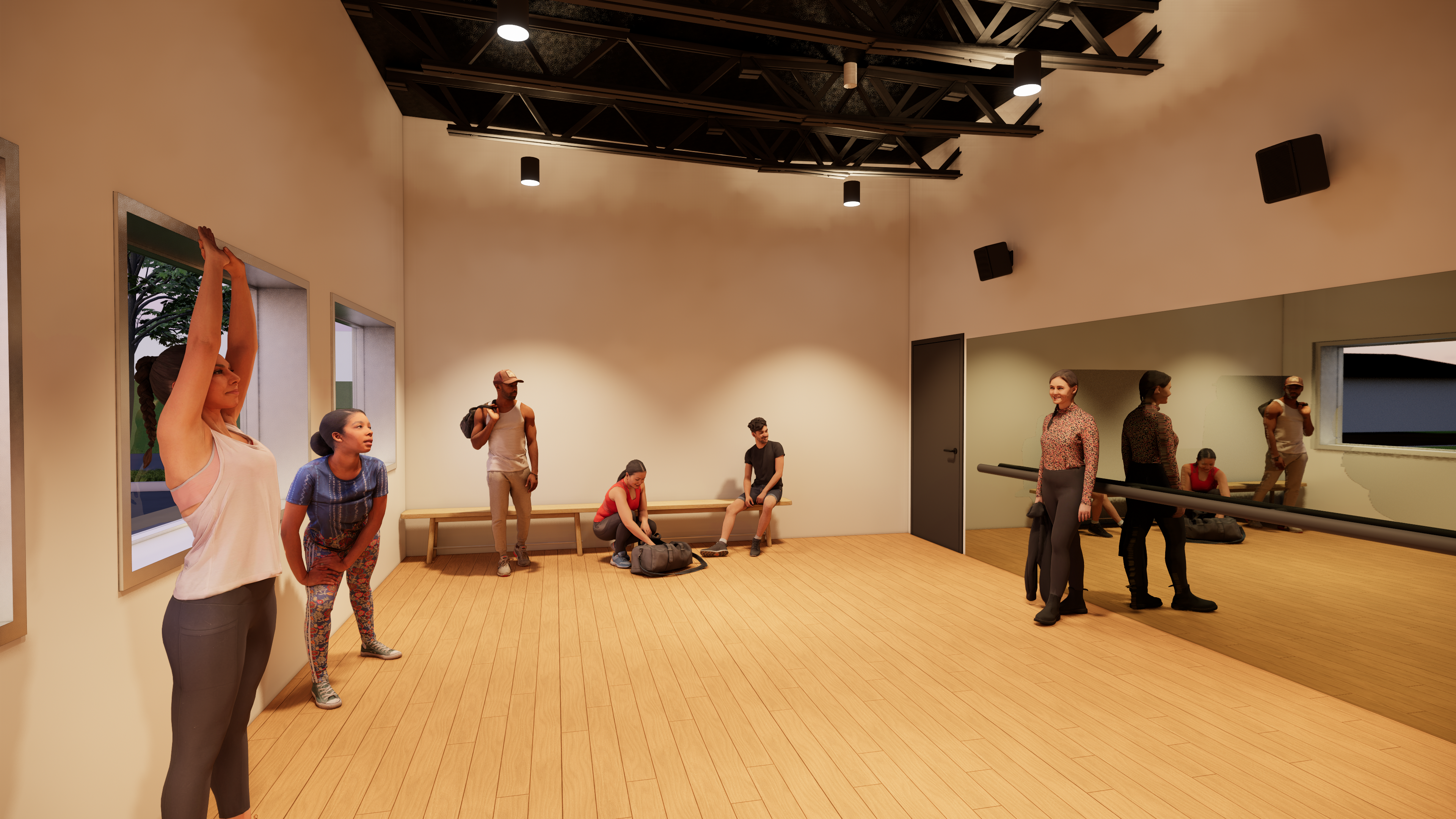
Fig.7 Yoga and Dance Room 2022

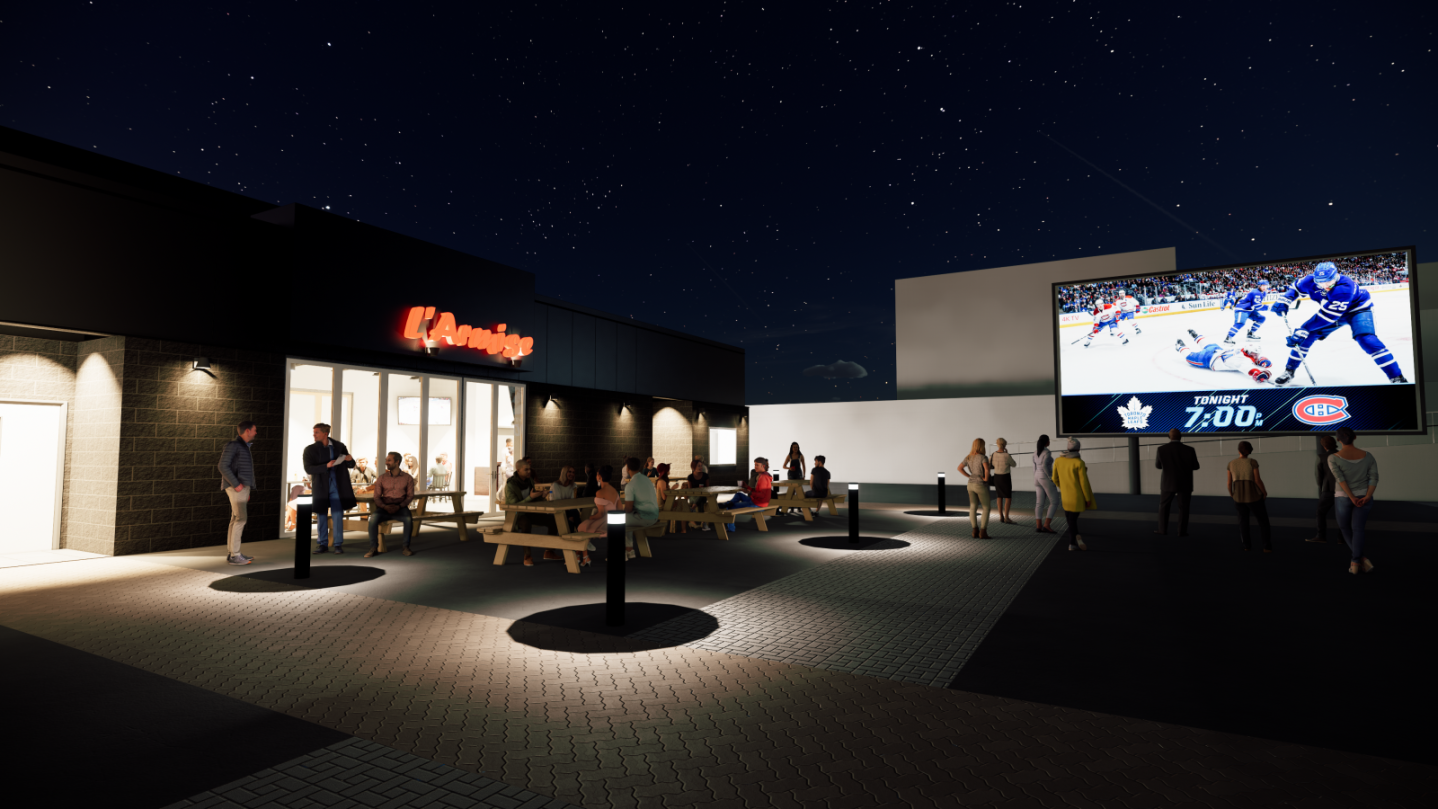
Fig.8 L'Armise at Night 2022

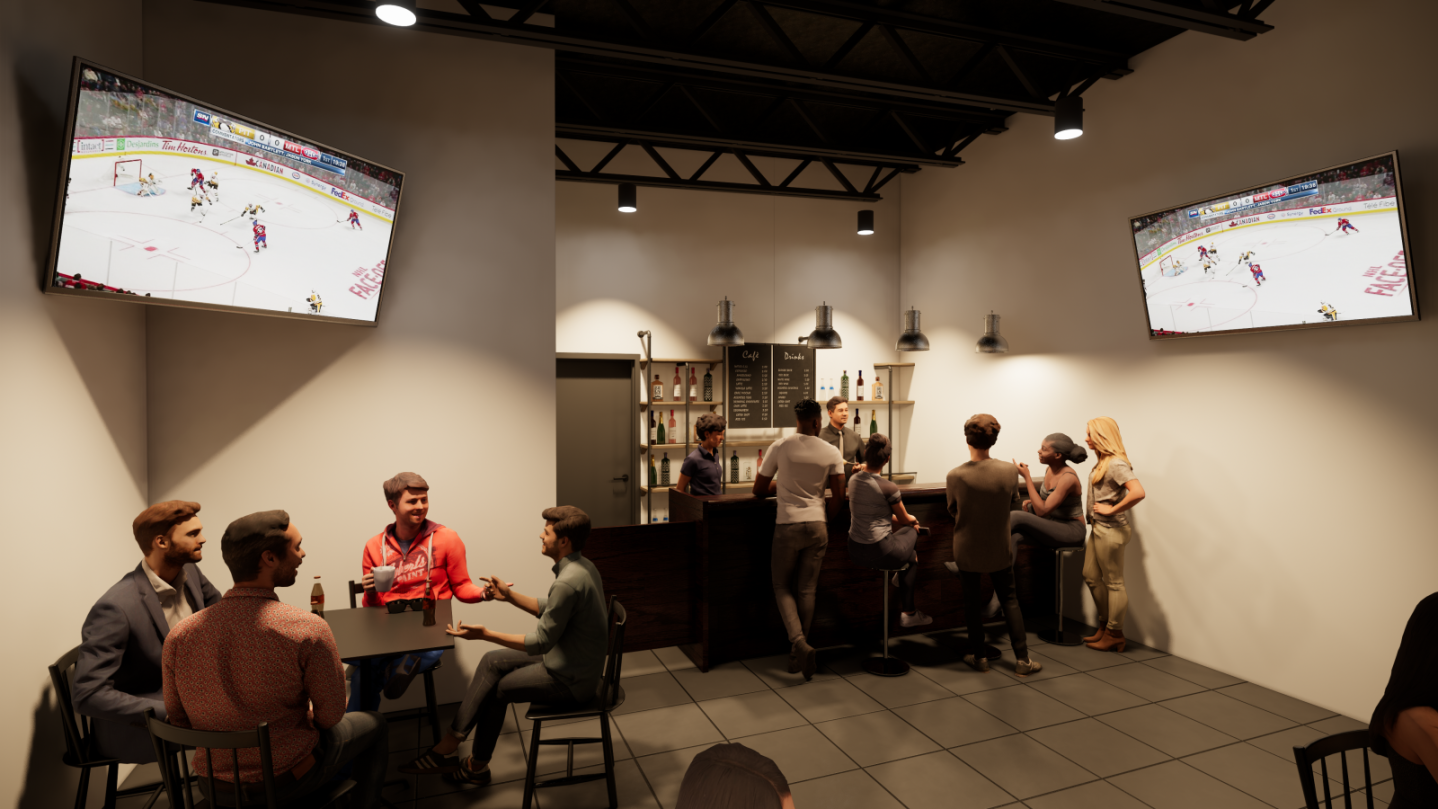
Fig.9 L'Armise Interior Bar 2022

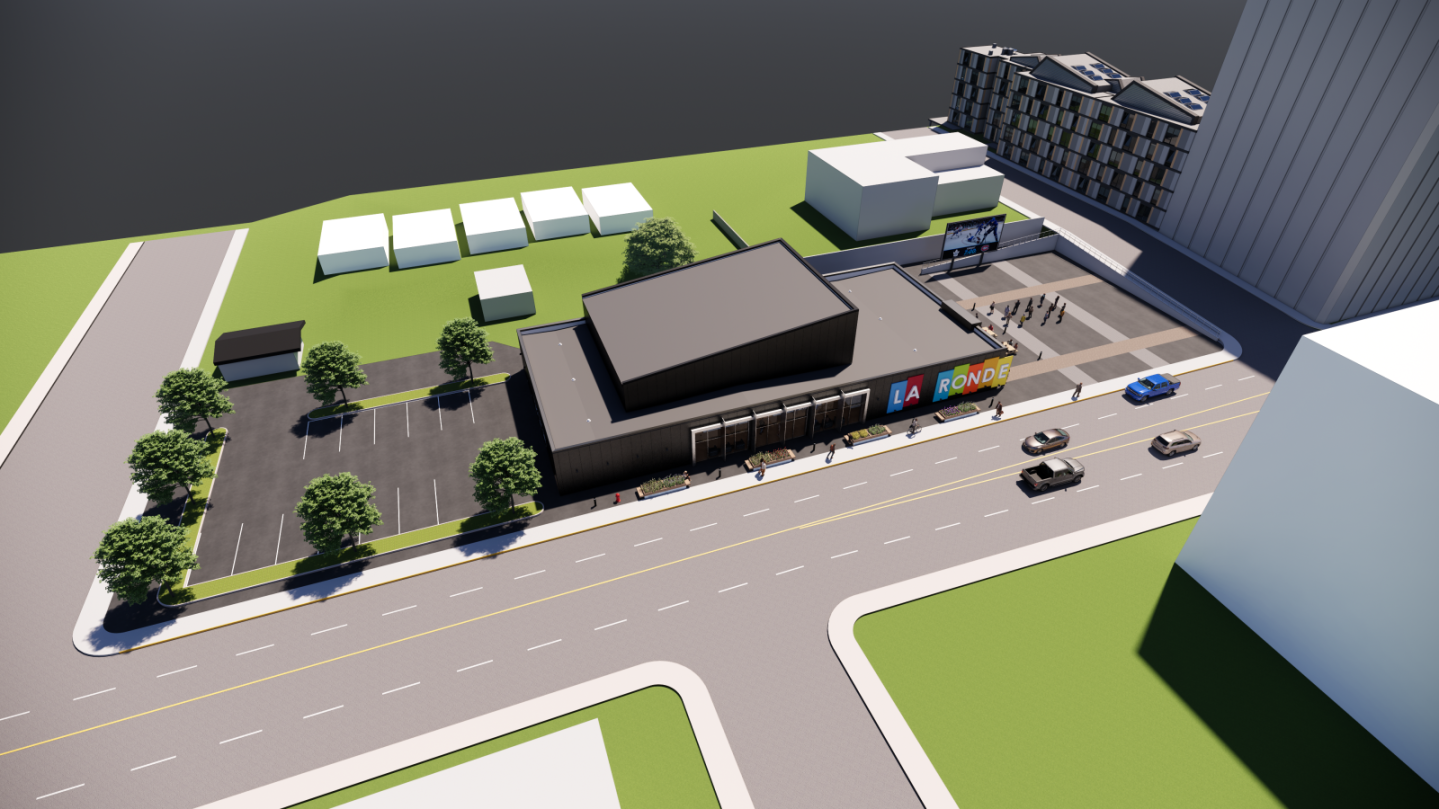
Fig.10 Site Perspective 2022

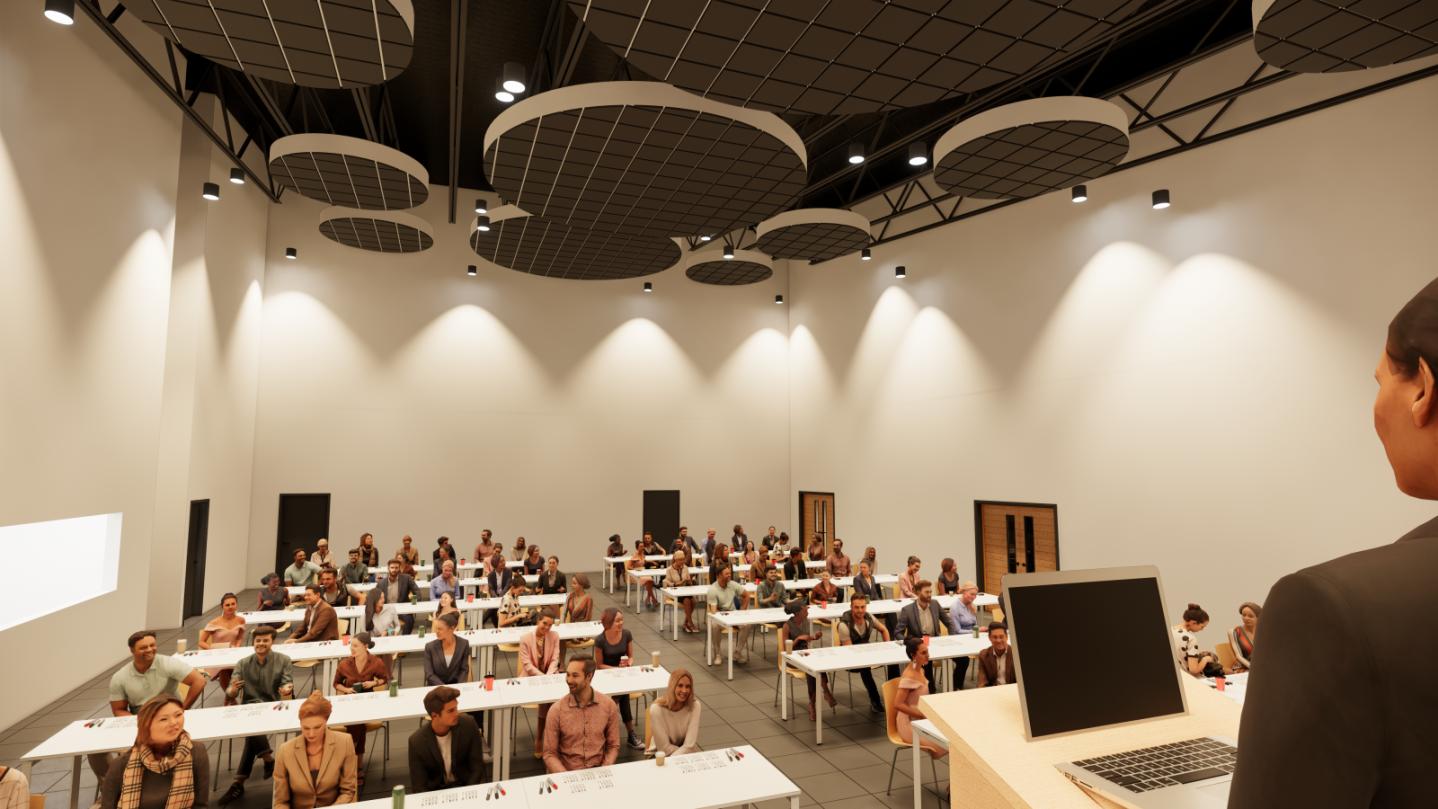
Fig.11 Gallery Overview 2022
