= Ivanhoe Lake Provincial Park =

Provincial park in Ontario, Canada

- IUCN category II (national park)
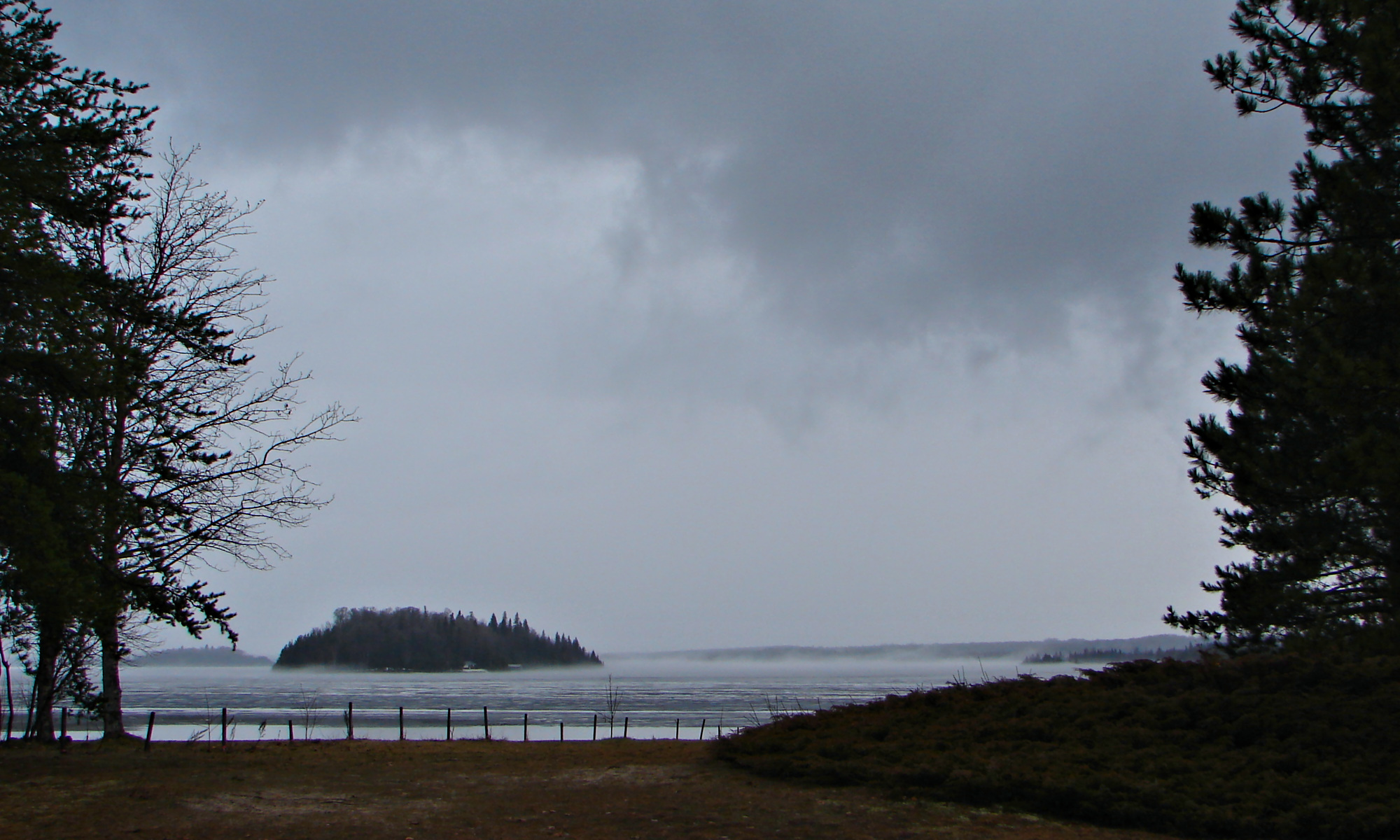
- Storm over Ivanhoe Lake PP

- Location within Ontario
- Interactive map of Ivanhoe Lake Provincial Park
- Location: Sudbury District, Northeastern Ontario, Canada
- Nearest town: Foleyet
- Coordinates: 48°08′57″N 82°30′43″W
- Area: 7,705.00 ha (29.7492 sq mi)
- Elevation: 354 m (1,161 ft)
- Established: 1957
- Visitors: 29,796 (in 2022)
- Governing body: Ontario Parks
- Website: www.ontarioparks.com/park/ivanhoelake

Ivanhoe Lake Provincial Park is an operating natural environment class park and protected area in the Unorganized North Part of Sudbury District in Northeastern Ontario, Canada. It is in the James Bay drainage basin, encompasses almost all of Ivanhoe Lake on the Ivanhoe River, and is located 8 kilometres (5 mi) southwest of the community of Foleyet on Ontario Highway 101.

== Facilities ==
The park has play areas adjacent to a sandy wading and swimming beach. It also has 120 camp sites of which 64 have electrical hookup, and offers showers, flush toilets, a store, canoe rental, and a boat launch.

== Natural history ==
Ivanhoe Lake Provincial Park has a number of glacial features including eskers, kettle lakes and a kettle lake that has become a quaking bog. It is in the Boreal forest biome and has plant species such as wild rice and six species of orchids.
