= Shawmere, Ontario =

Shawmere
- Dispersed Rural Community
- Location in Ontario
- Coordinates: 48°20′22″N 82°32′31″W
- Country: Canada
- Province: Ontario
- District: Sudbury
- Established: 1913
- Elevation: 314 m (1,030 ft)
- Time zone: UTC-5 (Eastern Time Zone)
  - Summer (DST): UTC-4 (Eastern Time Zone)
- Postal Code FSA: P0M

Shawmere is an unincorporated place and dispersed rural community in geographic Oates Township, in the Unorganized North part of Sudbury District in northeastern Ontario, Canada. It is on the Canadian National Railway transcontinental railway main line between the railway point of Missonga to the west and the compact rural community of Foleyet to the east, has a passing track, and is passed but not served by Via Rail transcontinental Canadian trains. Shawmere is on the Shawmere River, part of the James Bay drainage basin.

== History ==
Shawmere is on part of a section of what was originally the Canadian Northern Railway that was under construction from 1912 to 1913.
