= Mining district (North America) =

Special-purpose administrative subdivision

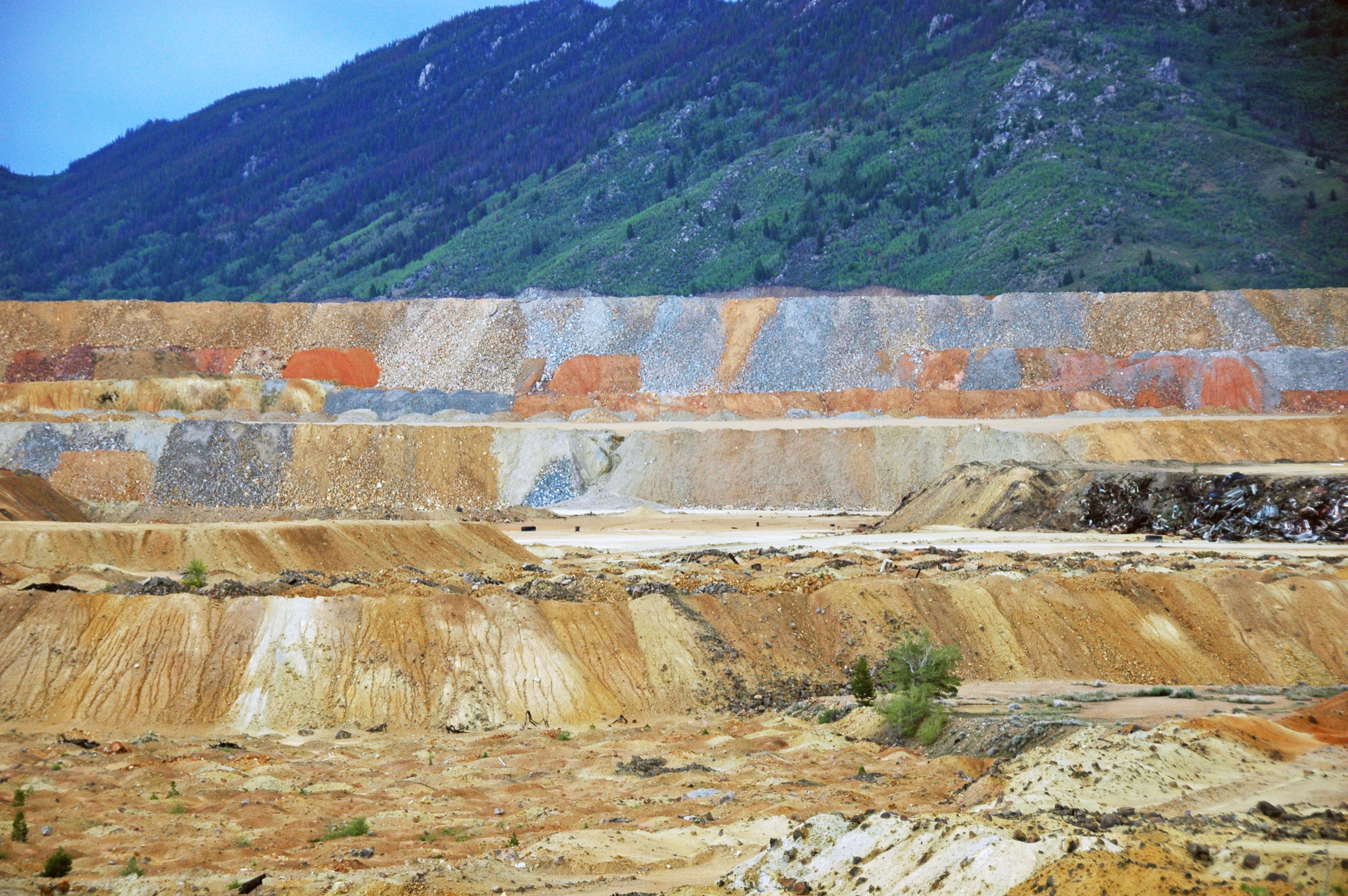
Waste rock from copper mine, Butte Mining District, Montana

A mining district is a special-purpose administrative subdivision used in North America. Mining districts were organized in sparsely populated, remote areas where mineral and metals mining was a viable commercial enterprise. Initially improvised as a means of self-governance for 19th-century prospectors, mining districts were eventually statutorily defined and still exist.

== Definitions and history ==
According to a 1904 dictionary of U.S. statutory language, "a mining district is a section of country usually designated by name and described or understood as being confined in certain boundaries, in which gold or silver or both are found in paying quantities, and which is worked therefor, under rules and regulations prescribed by the miners." Per the U.S. Bureau of Mines, mining districts were initially organized "in the absence of all other authority," and there is no limit to the territorial extent which may be contained with any given district. Further, the bounds of a mining district can be readily changed "if vested rights are not thereby interfered with." A 1935 mining report complained of "considerable difficulty" in determining "just what should constitute a mining district" for the purposes of the report, noting extremely wide variation in size and constantly changing names applied to associated or seemingly overlapping areas. The report concluded that an ideal mining district would be of moderate size, clearly defined, and contain geographically or geologically related ores. However in practice, local, historical and geological definitions of a mining district vary widely and may conflict. An 1897 U.S. government report published during the Klondike Gold Rush differences noted differences in the definition American and Canadian mining districts: Americans established separate districts along every creek, whereas Canadians defined a "locality" as being a whole river and its affluents.

Per historical geographer Richard V. Francaviglia, mining districts were typically established around a cluster of productive mines located in a "rather remote" area and notes, "Although we tend to think of individual towns when mining areas are mentioned, these towns exist in the context of mining districts that may cover dozens or even hundreds of square miles. Mining districts are created when and where sufficient prospecting and mining activity has occurred to warrant the establishment of specific laws and agreements governing the mining of ores and the designation of claims. Thus, the establishment of a mining district occurs at the end of a period of pioneering and marks the beginning of serious colonization or settlement. The ultimate shape of a mining district is determined by the distribution and character of its ores and by the attitudes and backgrounds of the miners who initially settle the place."

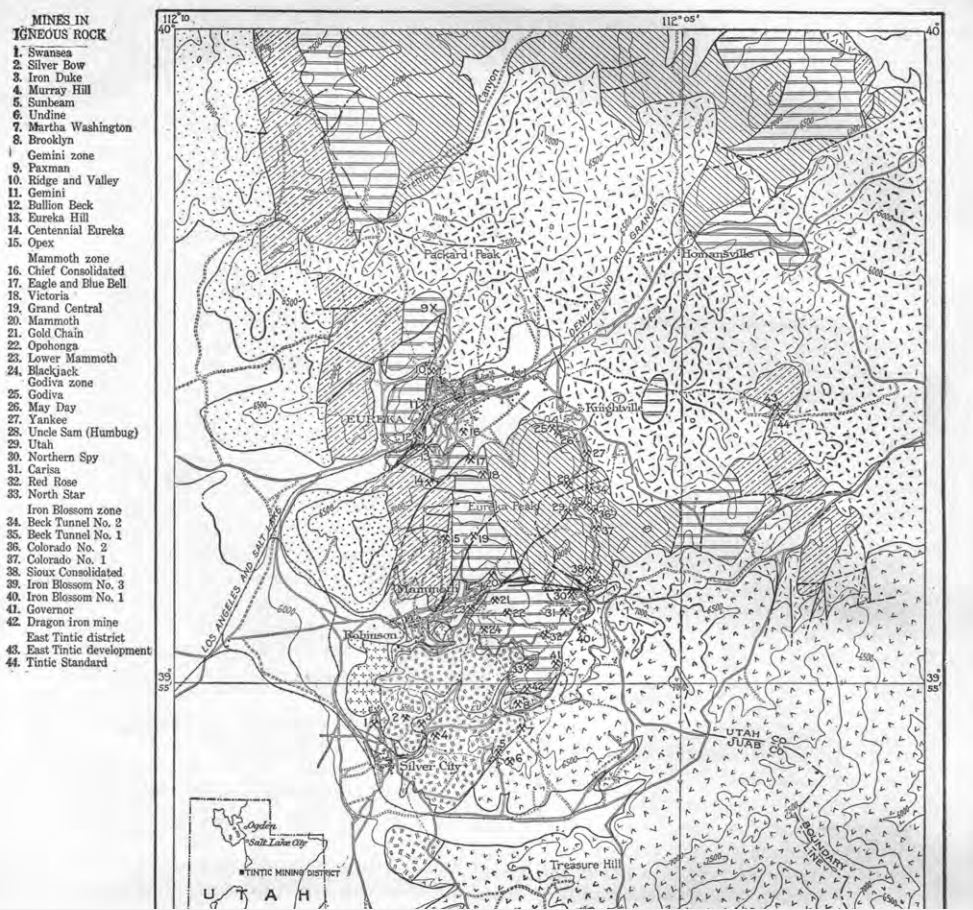
USGS Tintic Mining District geologic map and mine locations

Furthermore, mining districts often contained a "crazy patchwork" of mining claims, many of which had "complicated irregular boundaries." Historic mining districts, which over time would develop smelting or processing facilities, extensive rail infrastructure, housing for miners, and an assortment of services for the community, are described as being organized like massive region-wide outdoor factories with all the machinery exposed to the sky.

An account of the 100-year history of the Warren Mining District around the copper deposits of Bisbee, Arizona noted that mining activity itself can dramatically change the geography of an older district.

The USGS has produced a "definitive report" written by economic geologists about "almost every major mining district" in the United States.

== Notable mining districts (and major cities) ==
- Baldy Mining District, New Mexico
- Bohemia mining district, Oregon
- Bremner Historic Mining District, Alaska
- Bullfrog District, Nevada (Rhyolite)
- Clifton-Morenci Mining District, Arizona
- Colorado Mining District (New Mexico Territory), now Nevada
- Comstock District, Nevada (Virginia City)
- Fairbanks mining district, Alaska
- Ivanhoe mining district, Nevada
- Juneau mining district, Alaska
- Leadville mining district, Colorado
- New World Mining District, Montana
- Nome mining district, Alaska
- Pinacate Mining District, California
- Potosi Mining District, Nevada
- Ruby Mining District, Washington
- Ruby–Poorman mining district, Alaska
- Rush Creek mining district, Arkansas
- Spruce Pine Mining District, North Carolina
- Stibnite Mining District, Idaho
- Tintic Mining District, Utah
- Tri-State Mining District
- Warren Mining District, Arizona (Bisbee)
- Willow Creek mining district, Alaska
- Yentna-Cache Creek mining district, Alaska
