= Elsas, Ontario =

Elsas
- Railway point
- Location in Ontario
- Coordinates: 48°31′18″N 82°54′16″W
- Country: Canada
- Province: Ontario
- District: Algoma
- Established: 1915
- Elevation: 314 m (1,030 ft)
- Time zone: UTC-5 (Eastern Time Zone)
  - Summer (DST): UTC-4 (Eastern Time Zone)
- Postal Code FSA: P0M

Elsas is an unincorporated place and railway point in geographic Kapuskasing Township, in the Unorganized North part of Algoma District in northeastern Ontario, Canada. It is on the Canadian National Railway transcontinental railway main line between the railway points of Agate to the west and Oatland to the east, and is the location of Elsas railway station, a stop for Via Rail transcontinental Canadian trains. The station and settlement are on the northern shore of Kapuskasing Lake, the source of the Kapuskasing River.

== History ==
Elsas is part of a section of what was originally the Canadian Northern Railway (CNoR) that was under construction from 1913 to 1915. The establishment of sawmills and other industries along the railway route was delayed until after World War 1. In 1920 the Continental Wood Products Corporation (CWPC) selected this site for the location of its mill. The closest passing track on the CNR was at Agate, 3 miles to the west. The station and settlement were named for Herman Elsas, president of CWPC. The mill closed in 1928 when remaining timber berths were sold to Spruce Falls Paper and Power further down the Kaspuskasing River in the town of Kapuskasing.
