= HMS Ivanhoe =

Two ships of the Royal Navy have borne the name HMS Ivanhoe.

- The first HMS Ivanhoe, a destroyer renamed HMS Lawford whilst still under construction in 1913
- The second HMS Ivanhoe (D16), an I-class destroyer launched 1937, sunk 1 September 1940
