= Ivanhoe mining district =

Mining district in Elko County, Nevada

Coordinates: 41.110°N 116.599°W

The Ivanhoe is a mining district in Elko County, Nevada, US. It is located in the Butte Creek Range, 10 miles (16 km) southeast of Midas, and 30 miles (48 km) north-northeast of Battle Mountain. It is situated at an elevation of 6,099 feet (1,859 m) above sea level. Mercury mining took place in Ivanhoe between the time of the discovery of cinnabar ore in the 19th century and the mid-1940s. A rare dimorph of cinnabar, metacinnabar, has also been reported in the Ivanhoe district. Gold mining started in the 1980s. The rare mineral, Ammonioalunite, has been discovered in a fossil hot spring deposit in Ivanhoe.

== History ==
The first mercury deposits in the area were established in 1915 by W. F. Roseberry and W. C. Davis. While the two created the Ivanhoe Springs Mining Company to extract the mercury, the operation lasted only until 1918. In 1927, multiple mining companies entered Ivanhoe to continue mining for mercury, and eventually, three mines were set up: the Butte, the Governor, and the Silver Cloud – each owned by separate mining companies. Of these mines, the Butte mine produced the highest amount of mercury flasks, at 1,032 from its year of establishment to 1944, when all mines Ivanhoe stopped operating due to World War II.

Although mining operations were revived post-World War II, the amount of mercury produced was minuscule compared to what it was prior. Uranium mining was also conducted in 1960, though only small amounts were able to be extracted. However, in the 1980s, Ivanhoe regained the interest of mining companies due to the advent of microscopic gold mining, and by 1992, around 500,000 ounces of gold were extracted from Ivanhoe mines.

== See also ==
- Gold mining in Nevada
