= Agate, Ontario =

Agate
- Railway point
- Location in Ontario
- Coordinates: 48°31′22″N 82°57′49″W
- Country: Canada
- Province: Ontario
- District: Algoma
- Established: 1915
- Elevation: 320 m (1,050 ft)
- Time zone: UTC-5 (Eastern Time Zone)
  - Summer (DST): UTC-4 (Eastern Time Zone)
- Postal Code FSA: P0M

Agate is an unincorporated place and railway point in geographic Kapuskasing Township, in the Unorganized North part of Algoma District in northeastern Ontario, Canada. It is on the Canadian National Railway transcontinental railway main line between the railway points of Dunrankin to the west and Elsas to the east, has a passing track, and is passed but not served by Via Rail transcontinental Canadian trains. The place is just northwest of Kapuskasing Lake, the source of the Kapuskasing River.

== History ==
Agate is part of a section of what was originally the Canadian Northern Railway that was under construction from 1913 to 1915.
