= Dunrankin, Ontario =

Dunrankin
- Railway point
- Location in Ontario
- Coordinates: 48°34′42″N 83°07′00″W
- Country: Canada
- Province: Ontario
- District: Algoma
- Established: 1915
- Elevation: 327 m (1,073 ft)
- Time zone: UTC-5 (Eastern Time Zone)
  - Summer (DST): UTC-4 (Eastern Time Zone)
- Postal Code FSA: P0M

Dunrankin is an unincorporated place and railway point in geographic Kirkwall Township, in the Unorganized North part of Algoma District in northeastern Ontario, Canada. It is on the Canadian National Railway transcontinental railway main line between the dispersed rural community of Peterbell to the west and the railway point of Agate to the east, and is passed but not served by Via Rail transcontinental Canadian trains. The place is on the Dunrankin River, a left tributary of the Kapuskasing River.

== History ==
Dunrankin is part of a section of what was originally the Canadian Northern Railway that was under construction from 1913 to 1915.

The westbound Canadian National "Super Continental" collided head-on with a freight train that was leaving a siding and entering the main line near Dunrankin, Ontario, on August 2, 1967. The engineer and fireman on the Super Continental and the engineer and a brakeman on the freight train were all killed. One passenger was taken to hospital, while the other 150 passengers sustained no or only minor injuries. A fire started from oil spilled from the locomotives, but the fire was quickly put out from the help of nearby section hands who organized a bucket brigade with sand to smother the flames.
