= Ivanhoe River =

- Location of the mouth of the Ivanhoe River in Ontario

Location
- Country: Canada
- Province: Ontario
- Region: Northeastern Ontario
- Districts: Cochrane; Sudbury

Physical characteristics
- Source: Unnamed lake
  - location: Halsey Township, Sudbury District
  - coordinates: 47°40′56″N 83°10′57″W
  - elevation: 450 m (1,480 ft)
- Mouth: Groundhog River
  - location: Montcalm Township, Cochrane District
  - coordinates: 48°40′27″N 82°11′27″W
  - elevation: 262 m (860 ft)

Basin features
- River system: James Bay drainage basin
- Tributaries
  - left: Paypeeshek River, Shawmere River
  - right: Muskego River, Midway River, Kinogama River

The Ivanhoe River is a river in Cochrane District and Sudbury District in Northeastern Ontario, Canada. The river is in the James Bay drainage basin and is a left tributary of the Groundhog River.

== Course ==
The river begins at an unnamed lake in geographic Halsey Township in the Unorganized North Part of Sudbury District, and heads northeast under the Canadian Pacific Railway transcontinental main line — used at this point by Via Rail Sudbury – White River train — between the community of Nemegos to the west and Tophet to the east. It continues northeast through South Ivanhoe Lake and Halsey Lake, takes in the right tributary Kinogama River and reaches Ivanhoe Lake, substantially encompassed by Ivanhoe Lake Provincial Park.

The river has two outlets from Ivanhoe Lake: Ivanhoe River (Old Channel), the left (west) channel at the northwest of the lake, and Ivanhoe River (New Channel), the right channel (east) at the northeast.

- the Old Channel passes out of the lake under Ontario Highway 101 and reaches the community of Foleyet.
- the New Channel passes out of the lake controlled by the Ivanhoe Lake Dam, a barrage dam to regulate the water level on the lake and headwaters storage for hydroelectric generating stations further downstream in the drainage basin. It then takes in the right tributary Midway River, passes under the Canadian National Railway (CNR) transcontinental main line, served at this point by Via Rail Canadian trains stopping at the adjacent Foleyet railway station, takes in the right tributary Muskego River, passes again under the CNR line, and then under Highway 101 at Foleyet.

The two channels then recombine, and the river heads north, again under the CNR line, takes in the left tributary Shawmere River, passes through The Chutes, a natural water chute, and passes into the Unorganized North Part of Cochrane District at the geographic Nova Township. It turns northeast, takes in the left tributary Paypeeshek River, and reaches its mouth at the Groundhog River in geographic Montcalm Township; the Groundhog River flows via the Mattagami River and Moose River to James Bay.

== Economy ==
Two small hydroelectric generating stations with associated dams and works were proposed by Xeneca Power Development for sites at The Chutes and 30 kilometres (19 mi) downstream at Third Falls. The two generating stations were proposed to have a capacity of 8.7 MW and the projects received feed-in-tariff contracts from the Ontario Power Authority.

Actions taken by the Ontario Rivers Alliance and its members led to the termination of 19 Feed-in-Tariff (FIT) Contracts. The Chutes and Third Falls on the Ivanhoe River were protected from development. 10 Ontario rivers were protected in all: Matawin, Vermilion, Petawawa, Wanapitei, Blanche, Ivanhoe, Frederick House, Kapuskasing, Larder, and Serpent Rivers.

== Tributaries ==
- Paypeeshek River (left)
- Komak Creek (left)
- Osishana Creek (left)
- Oates Creek (left)
- Shawmere River (left)
- Biting Creek (right)

Two channels recombine

- Ivanhoe River (Old Channel) - left bifurcation
  - Sloans Creek (left)
- Ivanhoe River (New Channel) - right bifurcation
  - Muskego River (right)
  - Midway River (right)

Bifurcation from Ivanhoe Lake into Ivanhoe River (Old Channel) and Ivanhoe River (New Channel)

- Gullystone Creek (right)
- Jackpine Creek (left)
- Hellyer Creek (left)
- Biggs Creek (right)
- Kinogama River (right)
- Wright Creek (left)

== See also ==
- List of rivers of Ontario
