= Oatland, Ontario =

Oatland
- Railway point
- Location in Ontario
- Coordinates: 48°28′08″N 82°47′43″W
- Country: Canada
- Province: Ontario
- District: Algoma
- Established: 1913
- Elevation: 331 m (1,086 ft)
- Time zone: UTC-5 (Eastern Time Zone)
  - Summer (DST): UTC-4 (Eastern Time Zone)
- Postal Code FSA: P0M

Oatland is an unincorporated place and railway point in geographic Lougheed Township, in the Unorganized North part of Algoma District in northeastern Ontario, Canada. It is on the Canadian National Railway transcontinental railway main line between the railway points of Elsas to the west and Missonga to the east, has a passing track, and is passed but not served by Via Rail transcontinental Canadian trains. Oatland is on Shiners Creek, a right tributary of the Nemegosenda River.

== History ==
Oatland is on part of a section of what was originally the Canadian Northern Railway that was under construction from 1912 to 1913.
