= Groundhog River =

River in Northeastern Ontario, Canada

Groundhog River Rivière Groundhog (in French)
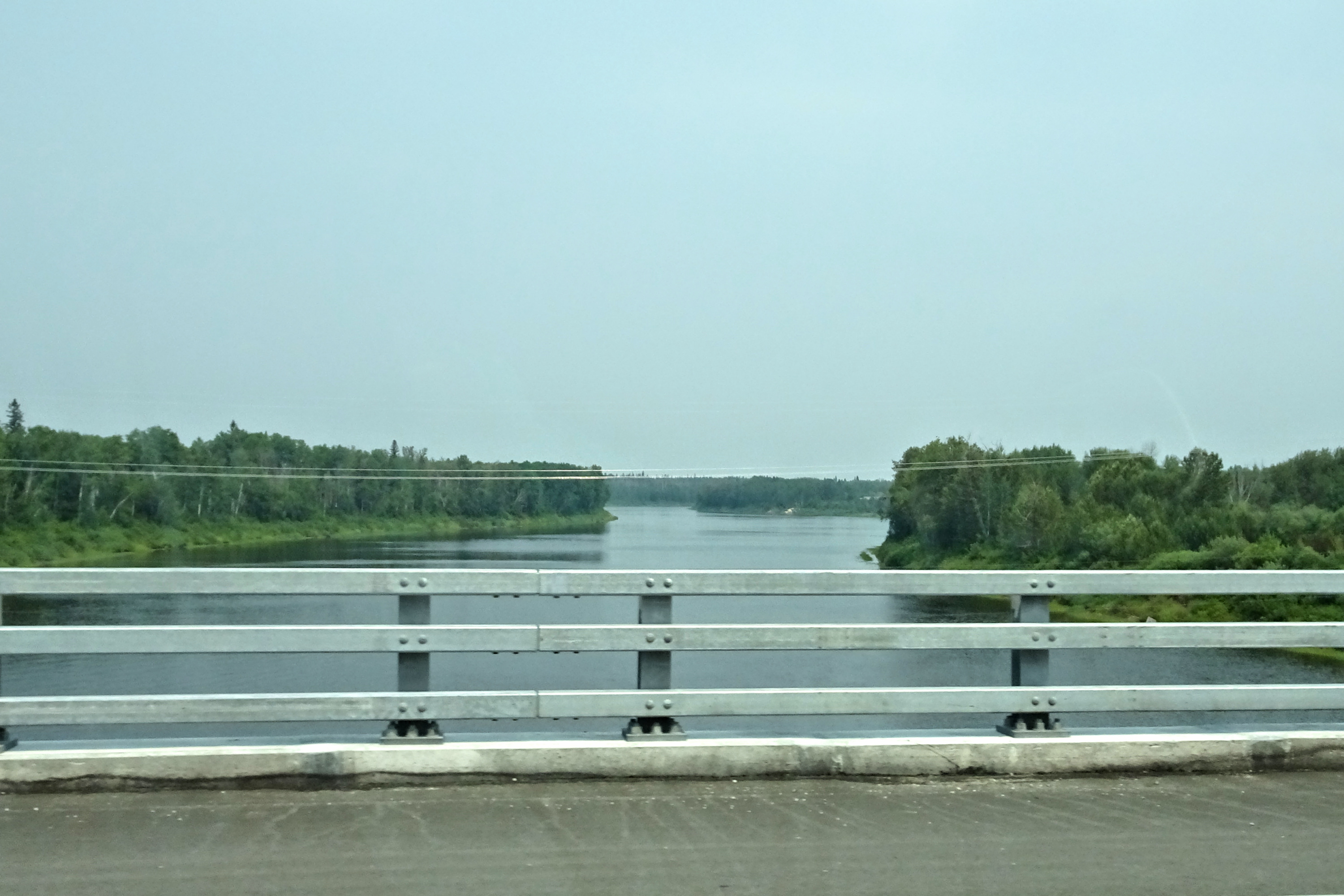
- Groundhog River at Highway 11

- Location of the mouth of the Groundhog River in Ontario

Location
- Country: Canada
- Province: Ontario
- Region: Northeastern Ontario
- Districts: Cochrane; Sudbury

Physical characteristics
- Source: Horwood Lake
  - location: Keith Township, Sudbury District
  - coordinates: 48°06′00″N 82°16′13″W
  - elevation: 336 m (1,102 ft)
- Mouth: Mattagami River
  - location: Clay Township, Cochrane District
  - coordinates: 49°43′04″N 81°58′04″W
  - elevation: 191 m (627 ft)

Basin features
- Progression: Mattagami River→ Moose River→ James Bay
- River system: James Bay drainage basin
- Tributaries
  - left: Wakusimi River, Otapingshewee River, Ivanhoe River
  - right: Nat River

The Groundhog River is a river in Cochrane District and Sudbury District in Northeastern Ontario, Canada. The river is in the James Bay drainage basin and is a left tributary of the Mattagami River.

About 23 fish species have been identified in the Groundhog River, including self-sustaining population of lake sturgeon which are provincially rare to uncommon.

The Groundhog River is an advanced-level canoe route with several series of rapids and white water, in particular from the north of Groundhog Lake to the town of Fauquier; however, this river trip can be extended all the way to James Bay via the Mattagami and Moose Rivers.

== Course ==
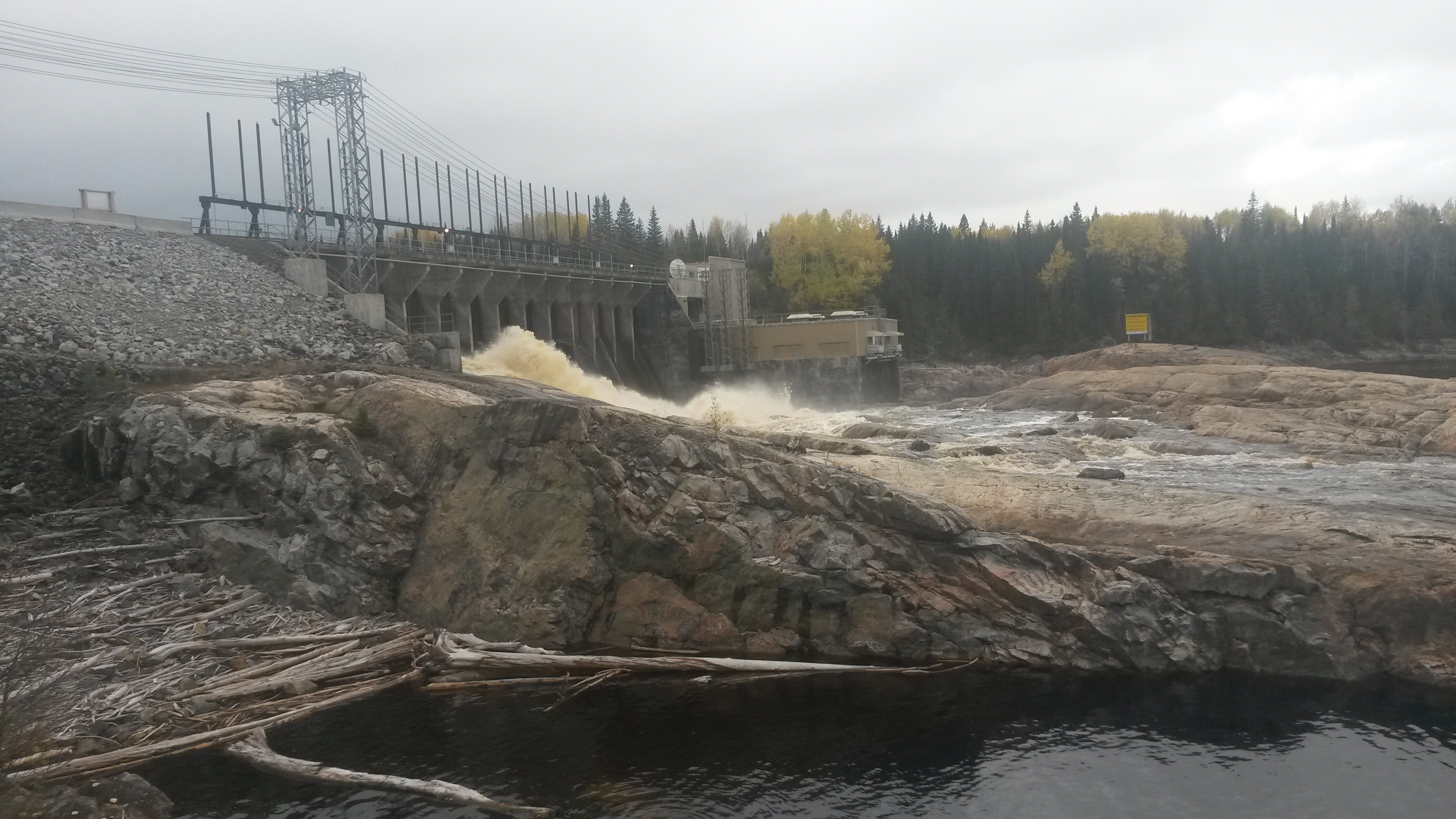
Carmicheal hydroelectric dam

The river begins at Horwood Lake in geographic Keith Township in the Unorganized North Part of Sudbury District. It flows northeast over the Ontario Power Generation Horwood Lake Dam, used to control water flow and store water for hydroelectricity generating stations downstream in the drainage basin, to Groundhog Lake, then north under the Canadian National Railway transcontinental main line at the railway point and unincorporated place of Groundhog River, between the railway point of Joburke to the west and the community of Kukatush to the east. The railway line is used by Via Rail transcontinental Canadian trains, but none of these locations is served by the train.

The river continues north under Ontario Highway 101, passes over the Upper Falls and series of unnamed cataracts and enters Cochrane District at geographic Enid Township. It continues north through the Flying Post 73 Indian Reserve, part of the Flying Post First Nation, over unnamed cataracts, jogs west then again north over the course of the Six Mile Rapids and takes in the left tributary Ivanhoe River and right tributary Nat River. The Groundhog River again jogs west, takes in the left tributary Otapingshewee River, then heads north through the Ten Mile Rapids, passes over the Carmichael Falls Generating Station and dam and takes in the left tributary Wakusimi River. It heads around Bremner Island, and reaches the community of Fauquier in the incorporated township of Fauquier-Strickland. It is crossed there by Ontario Highway 11 and by the Ontario Northland Railway secondary main line, formerly a Canadian National Railway secondary line and originally the National Transcontinental Railway transcontinental main line.

The river continues north around a series of small islands and the Dixon Rapids, Hamilton Rapids and La Duke Rapids, passes over the Whist Falls, and reaches its mouth at the Mattagami River in geographic Clay Township. The Mattagami River flows via the Moose River to James Bay.

=== Tributaries ===
- Beardmore Creek (right)
- Gauthier Creek (left)
- Wellington Creek (right)
- Nansen Creek (left)
- Bremner Creek (left)
- Wakusimi River (left)
- South Creek (right)
- Stringer Creek (right)
- Slack Creek (left)
- Hicks Creek (right)
- Otapingshewee River (left)
- Nat River (right)
- Montcalm Creek (right)
- Ivanhoe River (left)
- Scorch Creek (left)
- Vimy Creek (left)

== Groundhog River Waterway Provincial Park ==
Groundhog River Waterway Provincial Park
- IUCN category II (national park)
- Coordinates: 49°03′28″N 82°07′21″W
- Length: 180 km (110 mi)
- Area: 11,036 ha (42.61 sq mi)
- Designation: Waterway
- Established: 2006
- Governing body: Ontario Parks

The Groundhog River Waterway Provincial Park is a waterway park that protects about 180 kilometres (110 mi) of the river and its banks in 2 non-contiguous sections, from the outlet of Groundhog Lake to MacVicar geographic township, and from 10 kilometres (6.2 mi) downstream of Fauquier to its mouth at the Mattagami River. In the future, additional lands may be added that will reduce or remove the gap between the 2 sections. It was established in 2006 and is meant for remote canoe camping for advanced canoeists, as well as fishing, hunting, and nature watching.

Because of its length, the park features about 22 different landform vegetation combinations, of which weakly broken ground moraine and lacustrine deposits are the dominant types. Its vegetation is characterized by mixed conifer and mixed deciduous forests. It is a non-operating park, meaning that there are no facilities or services.

== See also ==
- List of rivers of Ontario
