= Kapuskasing River =

River in northeastern Ontario, Canada

Kapuskasing River Rivière de Kapuskasing
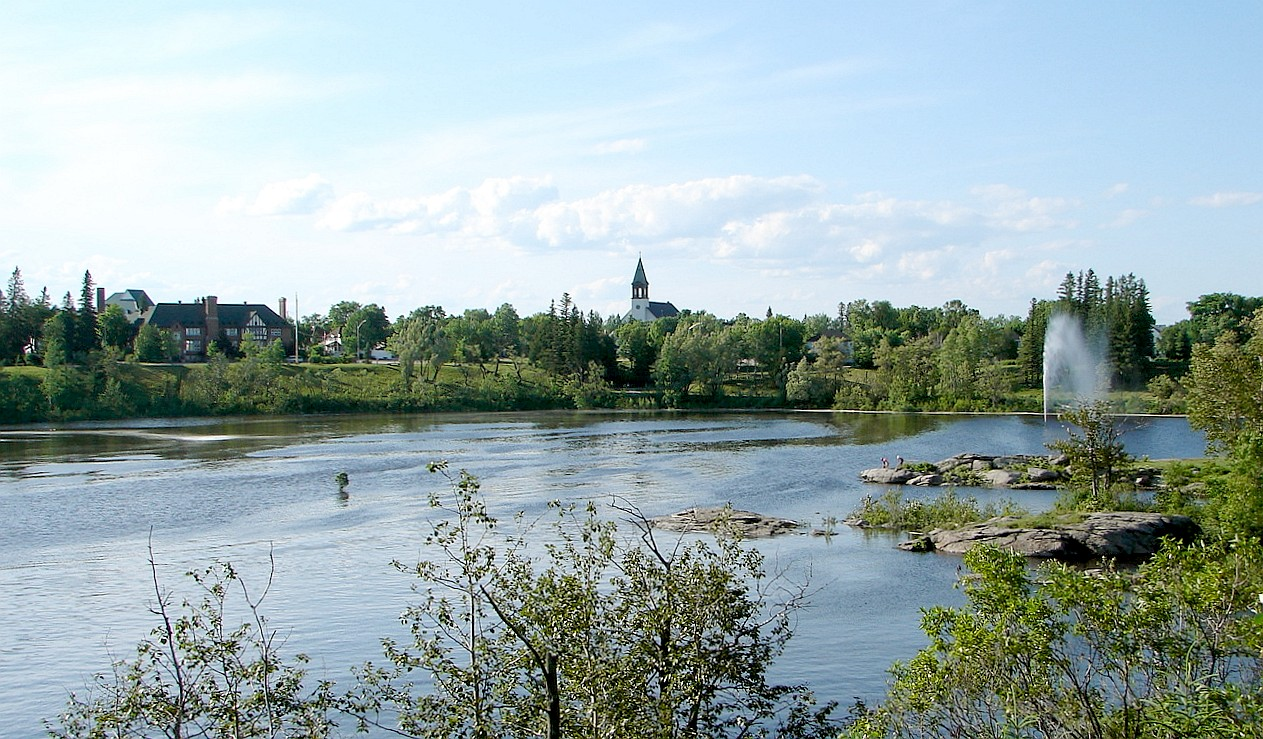
- Kapuskasing River in the town of Kapuskasing

- Location of the mouth of the Kapuskasing River in Ontario

Location
- Country: Canada
- Ontario: Ontario
- Region: Northeastern Ontario
- Districts: Cochrane; Algoma

Physical characteristics
- Source: Kapuskasing Lake
  - location: Kapuskasing Township, Algoma District
  - coordinates: 48°31′01″N 82°53′51″W
  - elevation: 312 m (1,024 ft)
- Mouth: Mattagami River
  - location: Clay Township, Cochrane District
  - coordinates: 49°48′31″N 82°00′10″W
  - elevation: 195 m (640 ft)

Basin features
- River system: James Bay drainage basin
- Tributaries
  - left: Lost River, Dunrankin River
  - right: Remi River, Saganash River, Nemegosenda River

The Kapuskasing River is a river in the James Bay drainage basin in Cochrane District and Algoma District in northeastern Ontario, Canada. The river is a left tributary of the Mattagami River.

== Course ==
The river begins at Kapuskasing Lake in geographic Kapuskasing Township, Algoma District, near the railway point of Elsas, on the Canadian National Railway transcontinental main line and the location of Elsas railway station served by Via Rail Canadian trains. It flows northeast under the mainline, takes in the right tributary Nemegosenda River, passes over the Jackpine Rapids (bypassed by the Jackpine Portage), the Loon Rapids, the Buchan Falls and the Clouston Rapids, and takes in the right tributary Dunrankin River. It heads north over the Cedar Rapids, heads over the Woman Falls and Old Woman Falls, and passes from geographic Shanly Township, Algoma District into geographic Cargill Township in Cochrane District.

The Kapuskasing River continues northeast over the White Otter Falls, the Bakatase Falls, the Camp Three Rapids and the Big Beaver Falls, takes in the right tributary Saganash River and reaches the town of Kapuskasing, where it is crossed by Ontario Highway 11 and the Ontario Northland Railway line (formerly Canadian National Railway, originally the National Transcontinental Railway). It passes over a hydro dam, the Spruce Falls, takes in the left tributary Lost River and right tributary Remi River, and reaches its mouth at the Mattagami River in geographic Clay Township, about 30 kilometres (19 mi) west of the community of Fraserdale. The Mattagami River flows via the Moose River to James Bay.

=== Tributaries ===
- Tucker Creek (right)
- Torrance Creek (right)
- Hopkins Creek (left)
- Remi River (right)
- Lily Creek (right)
- Lost River (left)
- O'Brien Creek (right)
- Teetzel Creek (left)
- Gough Creek (right)
- Saganash River (right)
- Big Beaver Creek (left)
- Alder Creek (right)
- Pinette Creek (right)
- Shanly Creek (right)
- Graveyard Creek (left)
- Moss Creek (left)
- Oscar Creek (left)
- Allenby Creek (right)
- Wigwam Creek (left)
- MacIntosh Creek (right)
- Dunrankin River (left)
- Nemegosenda River (right)
- Kapuskasing Lake
  - Chapleau River

== Recreation ==
The Kapuskasing River Walleye Tournament, part of the Northern Ontario Walleye Trail (NOWT), is held annually on the river on a 40-kilometre (25 mi) stretch of the river from its mouth upstream. More than 20,000 pounds of wild rice was restored in the Kapuskasing River.

== Economy ==
Hydroelectric generating stations with a combined capacity of 22 MW were proposed at four sites south of the town of Kapuskasing: Big Beaver Falls, Camp Three Rapids, White Otter Falls and Old Woman Falls. Each site features would have had an identical arrangement: location on the left bank of the river; two 2-metre (6 ft 7 in) diameter and 45-metre (148 ft) long inflatable diversion floodgates in the river; excavated approach channels and tail races; twin intakes, penstocks and identical 2.75 MW bulb turbines. The sites were expected to be in operation by 2012, but FIT Contracts were terminated in 2015.

In addition, hydroelectric generating stations with a combined capacity of 19.45 MW were proposed for four sites on the river between its source and to the south of the town of Kapuskasing.

Update: Actions taken by the Ontario Rivers Alliance and its members led to the termination of 19 Feed-in-Tariff (FIT) Contracts. Four sets of rapids on the Kapuskasing River were protected from development. 10 Ontario rivers were protected in all: Matawin, Vermilion, Petawawa, Wanapitei, Blanche, Ivanhoe, Frederick House, Kapuskasing, Larder, and Serpent Rivers.

== See also ==
- List of rivers of Ontario
