= Moose River (Ontario) =

Tributary of James Bay in Ontario, Canada

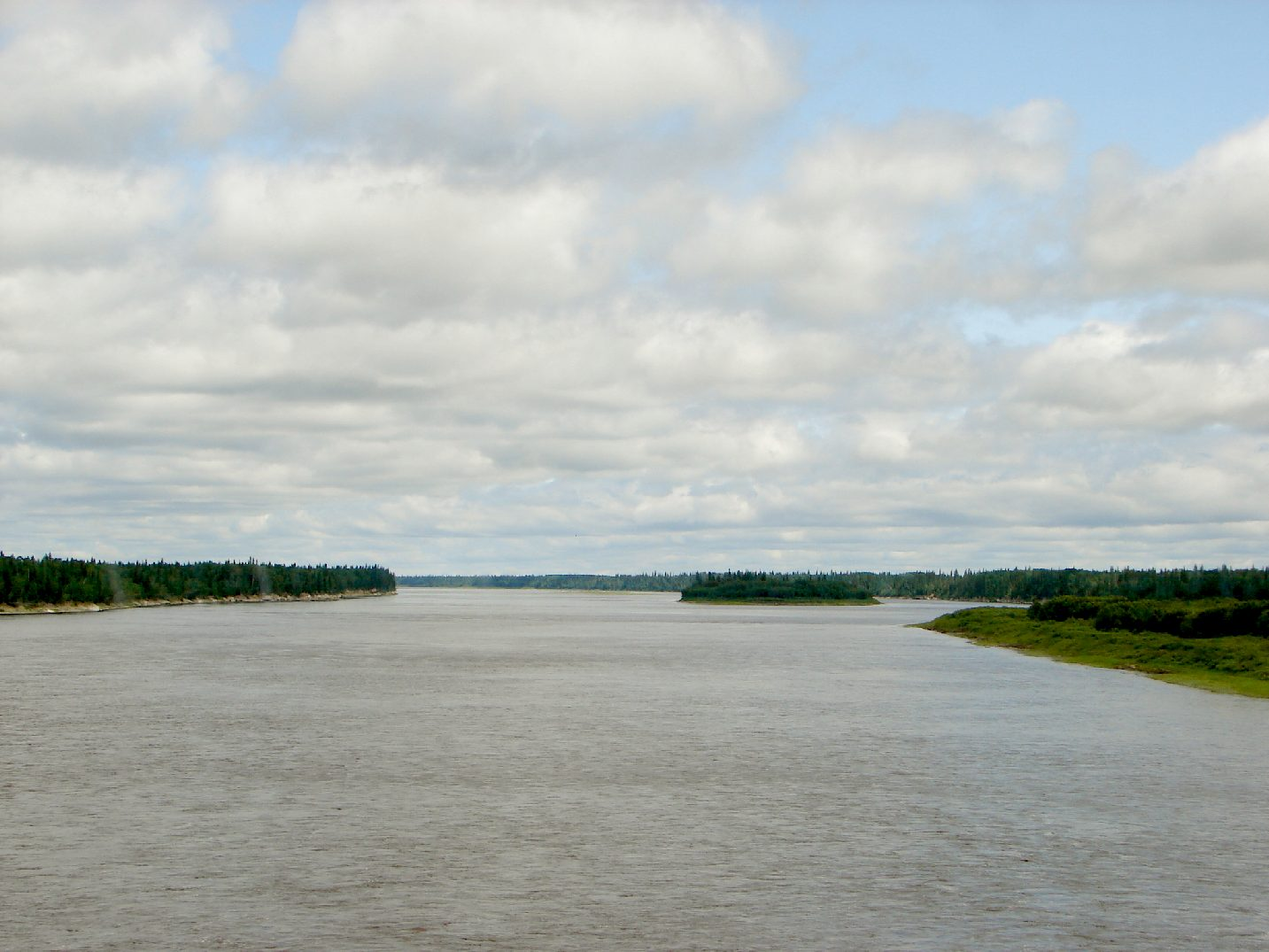
- Moose River as seen from the ONR railway bridge

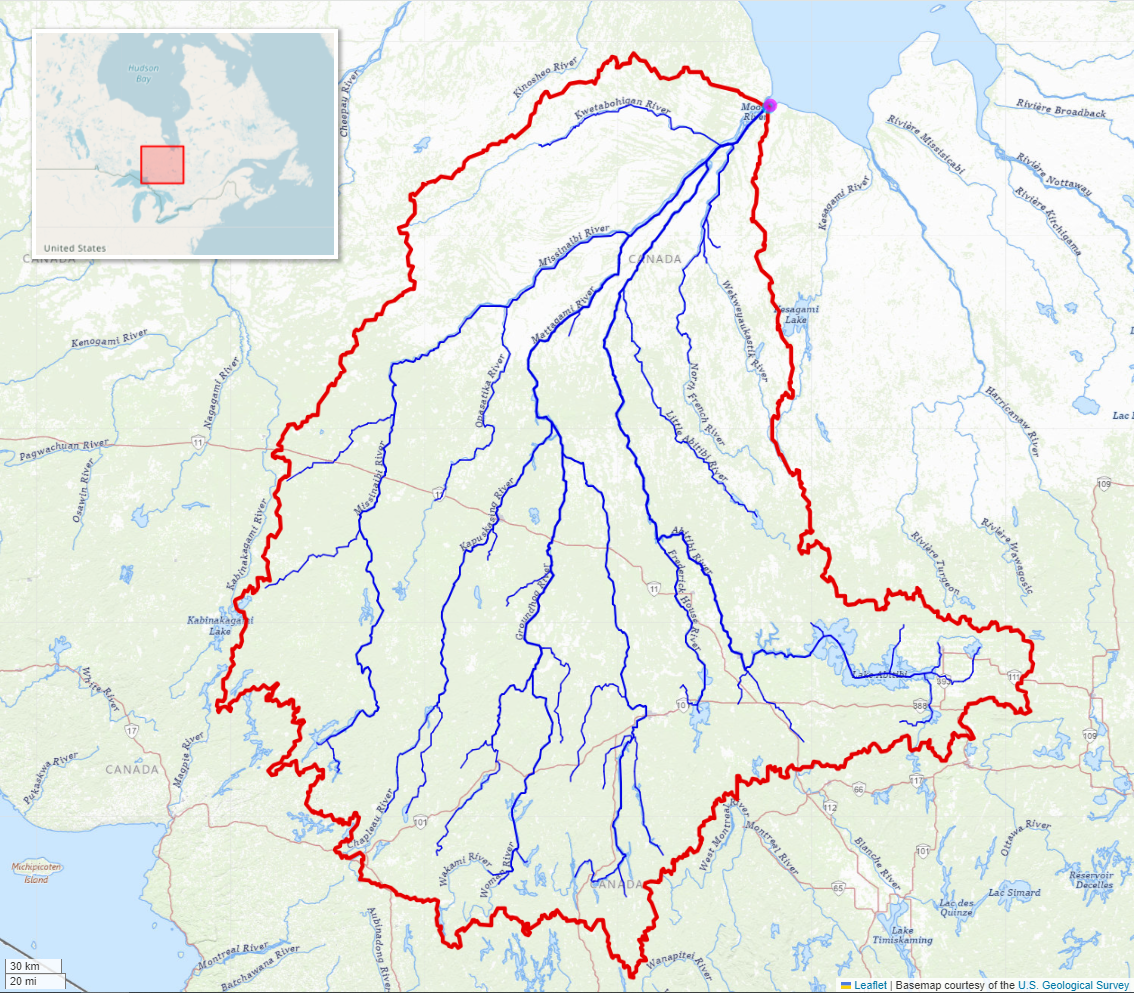
- Moose River basin map

- Location of the mouth of the Moose River in Ontario
- Native name: Moososiibii (Moose Cree)

Location
- Country: Canada
- Province: Ontario
- District: Cochrane

Physical characteristics
- Source confluence: Mattagami and Missinaibi Rivers
  - location: Unnamed wilderness of Unorg. Cochrane District
  - coordinates: 50°44′08″N 81°28′02″W
- Mouth: James Bay
  - location: 17 km NE from Moosonee
  - coordinates: 51°21′02″N 80°23′57″W
- Length: 104 km (65 mi)
- Basin size: 108,500 km^{2} (41,900 sq mi)
- Discharge
  - average: 1,370 m^{3}/s (48,000 cu ft/s)

The Moose River (Note: Moose Cree: moososiibii) is a river in the Hudson Plains ecozone of northern Ontario, Canada. The river flows 100 km northeast from the confluence of the Mattagami and Missinaibi Rivers into James Bay. Its drainage basin is 108,500 square kilometres (41,900 mi^{2}) and it has a mean discharge rate of 1,370 cubic metres (48,000 ft^{3}). Its full length is 547 kilometres (340 mi) if counted from the head of the Mattagami River.

This river formed part of the water route to Lake Superior in the days of the fur trade. Moose Factory, located on Moose Factory Island near the river's mouth, was a fur trading post of the Hudson's Bay Company and Ontario's first English settlement. Moosonee, on the north bank of the river, is the northern terminus of the Polar Bear Express railway route which begins at Cochrane, Ontario.

== Tributaries ==
The tributaries of this river include:

- North French River
- Kwetabohigan River
- Chimahagan River
- Abitibi River
  - Little Abitibi River
  - Frederick House River
  - Black River
  - Lake Abitibi
- Cheepash River
- Renison River
- Mattagami River
  - Kapuskasing River
    - Nemegosenda River
      - Chapleau River
  - Groundhog River
    - Ivanhoe River
    - Nat River
- Missinaibi River
  - Brunswick River
  - Fire River
  - Hay River
  - Mattawitchewan River
    - Albany Forks
      - Oba River, Oba Lake
  - Pivabiska River
  - Opasatika River
  - Soweska River

== Moose River Bird Sanctuary ==
Moose River Bird Sanctuary lies at the mouth of the Moose River and comprises Ship Sands Island and a piece of land on the eastern flats of the river mouth. The 14.60 km^{2} (5.64 sq mi) sanctuary is protected under the Migratory Birds Convention Act and is part of the Southern James Bay wetland complex, which was designated a wetland of international importance (Ramsar Convention) in May 1987.

This area plays a significant role in the annual cycle of waterfowl. The funnel-shaped outline of Hudson and James bays causes birds migrating from the Arctic to concentrate at the southern end of James Bay each autumn, particularly in the late autumn, where the extensive coastal wetlands provide critical staging and moulting areas for migrating lesser snow geese, dabbling ducks and shorebirds such as red knot, short-billed dowitcher, dunlin, greater yellowlegs, lesser yellowlegs, ruddy turnstone, and American golden plover.

== Settlement of Moose River ==
At mile 142 of the Polar Bear Express railway route there is a small settlement called Moose River. This settlement is just before a large railway bridge that crosses Moose River and is a flag stop on the Polar Bear Express rail route. There is an Ontario Northland Railway bunkhouse that used to be a school. The Moose River bridge was built in the 1930s and the settlement was a much larger community at that time. Currently the Moose River stop at mile 142 is used for the residents of the settlement and as a pick-up and drop-off site for boaters.

== See also ==
- List of Ontario rivers
