= Mattagami River =

Mattagami River Rivière Mattagami (in French)
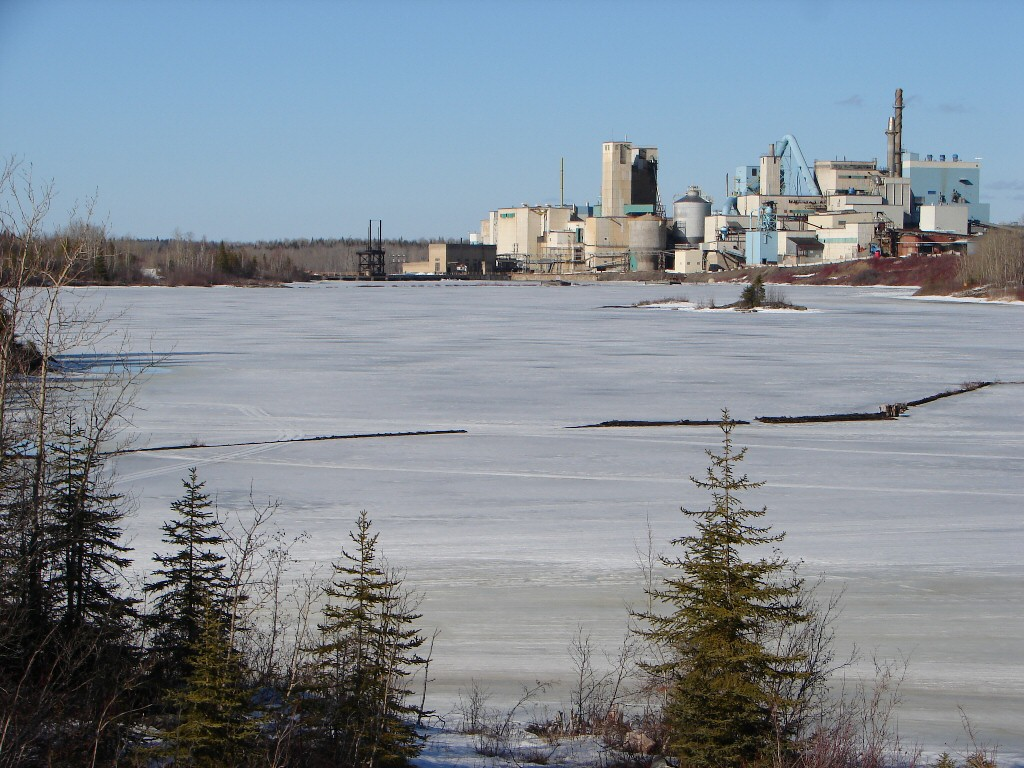
- Mattagami River at Smooth Rock Falls
- Etymology: Ojibwe language

Location
- Country: Canada
- Province: Ontario
- Region: Northeastern Ontario
- Districts: Cochrane; Timiskaming; Sudbury

Physical characteristics
- Source: Mattagami Lake
  - location: Gouin Township, Sudbury District
  - coordinates: 48°00′46″N 81°33′28″W
  - elevation: 330 m (1,080 ft)
- Mouth: Moose River
  - location: Gardiner Township, Cochrane District
  - coordinates: 50°43′42″N 81°29′14″W
  - elevation: 48 m (157 ft)
- Length: 443 km (275 mi)
- Basin size: 37,000 km^{2} (14,000 sq mi)

Basin features
- River system: James Bay drainage basin

The Mattagami River is a river in Northern Ontario, Canada.

The Mattagami flows 443 kilometres (275 mi) from its source at Mattagami Lake in geographic Gouin Township in the Unorganized North Part of Sudbury District, on the Canadian Shield southwest of Timmins, to Portage Island in geographic Gardiner Township in the Unorganized North Part of Cochrane District, in the Hudson Bay Lowlands. Here, the Mattagami's confluence with the Missinaibi River forms the Moose River, about 100 kilometres (60 mi) from that river's tidewater outlet at James Bay. The Mattagami River flows through the city of Timmins as well as the town of Smooth Rock Falls and its drainage basin encompasses 37,000 square kilometres (14,000 sq mi). It is close to tourism sites offering activities such as fishing, canoeing and nature-based relaxation.

The Mattagami's name comes from the Ojibwe and means either "the start of water" (maadaagami) or "turbulent water" (madaagami), but the local Ojibwe population claim "Mattagami" is a corrupted form of "confluence" (maadawaagami). According to the Mattagami First Nation, Mattagami means "Meeting of the Waters".

== Course ==
The Mattagami River flows generally north for approximately 443 kilometres (275 miles). Its drainage area covers about 37,000 square kilometres. The river originates at Mattagami Lake in the Sudbury District, southwest of the city of Timmins, and lies on the Canadian Shield. The upper course incorporates Kenogamissi Lake, which is managed for downstream power generation. The Mattagami flows north through the city of Timmins, which utilizes the river as a source of municipal drinking water. Further north, it passes the town of Smooth Rock Falls. Much of the middle section of the river has been developed for hydroelectric power, consisting of a chain of long lakes and reservoirs created by stations such as the Wawaitin, Sandy Falls, Lower Sturgeon, Yellow Falls (Boralex Power), Smooth Rock Falls (Gemini Power), Harmon, Kipling, Smoky Falls, and Little Long Generating Stations. The Mattagami continues its northward course, entering the flatter landscape of the Hudson Bay Lowlands. Its course officially ends at the confluence with the Missinaibi River near Portage Island in the Cochrane District. At this point, the two waterways combine to form the Moose River, which then flows northeast for approximately 100 kilometres (60 miles) before discharging into James Bay, the southern extent of Hudson Bay, near the communities of Moosonee and Moose Factory. Significant tributaries feeding the Mattagami include the Groundhog River, the Kapuskasing River, and the Tatachikapika River.

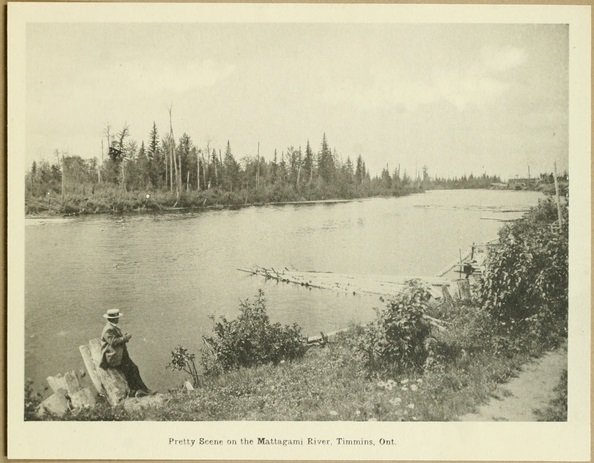
Mattagami River near Timmins, early 1900s

== Economy ==
North of the confluence of the Groundhog and Kapuskasing, and the Mattagami Rivers, Ontario Power Generation operates the Little Long Generating Station with a dam of over 5 km in length.

== Tributaries ==
Tributaries include the:

- Kapuskasing River
  - Nemegosenda River
    - Chapleau River
- Groundhog River
  - Ivanhoe River
  - Nat River
- Poplar Rapids River
- Kamiskotia River
- Grassy River
- Tatachikapika River
- Mattagami Lake
  - Minisinakwa River
    - Nabakwasi River
      - Opikinimika River
    - Noble River

== See also ==
- List of rivers of Ontario
