= Railroad tie =

Support for the rails in railroad tracks

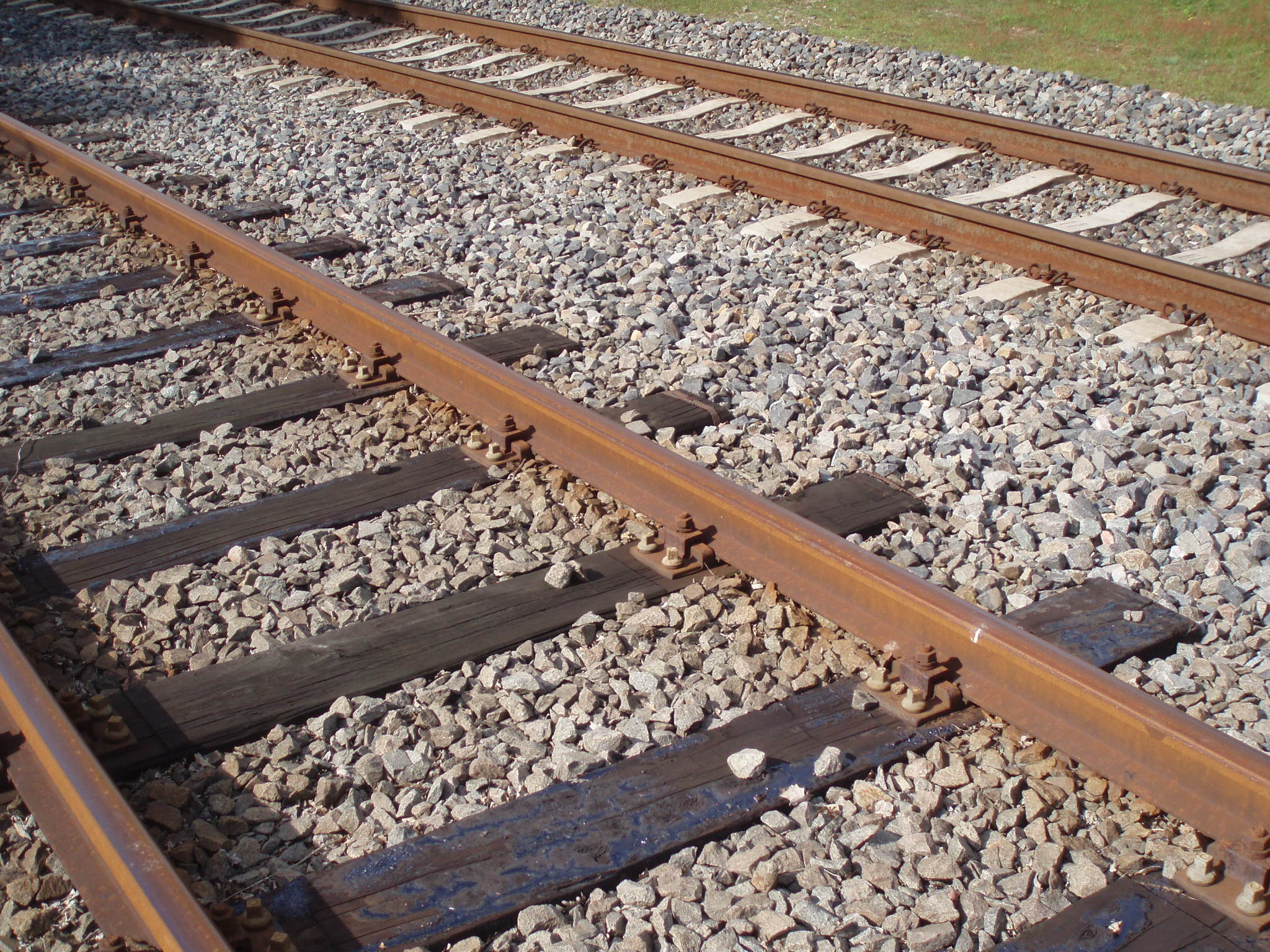
Wooden ties are used on many traditional railways. In the background is a track with concrete ties.

A railroad tie, crosstie (American English), railway tie (Canadian English) or railway sleeper (Australian and British English) is a rectangular support for the rails in railroad tracks. Generally laid perpendicular to the rails, ties transfer loads to the track ballast and subgrade, hold the rails upright and keep them spaced to the correct gauge.

Railroad ties are traditionally made of wood, but prestressed concrete is now also widely used, especially in Europe and Asia. Steel ties are common on secondary lines in the UK; plastic composite ties are also employed, although far less than wood or concrete. As of January 2008, the approximate market share in North America for traditional and wood ties was 91.5%, the remainder being concrete, steel, azobé (red ironwood) and plastic composite.

Tie spacing may depend on the type of tie, traffic loads and other requirements, for example 2,640 concrete ties per mile (1,640/km) on North American mainline railroads to 2,112 timber ties per mile (1,312/km) on London, Midland and Scottish Railway jointed track.

Rails in North America may be fastened to the tie by a railroad spike. Iron/steel baseplates screwed to the tie and secured to the rail by a proprietary fastening system such as a Vossloh or Pandrol are commonly used in Europe.

== Types ==
=== Stone block ===
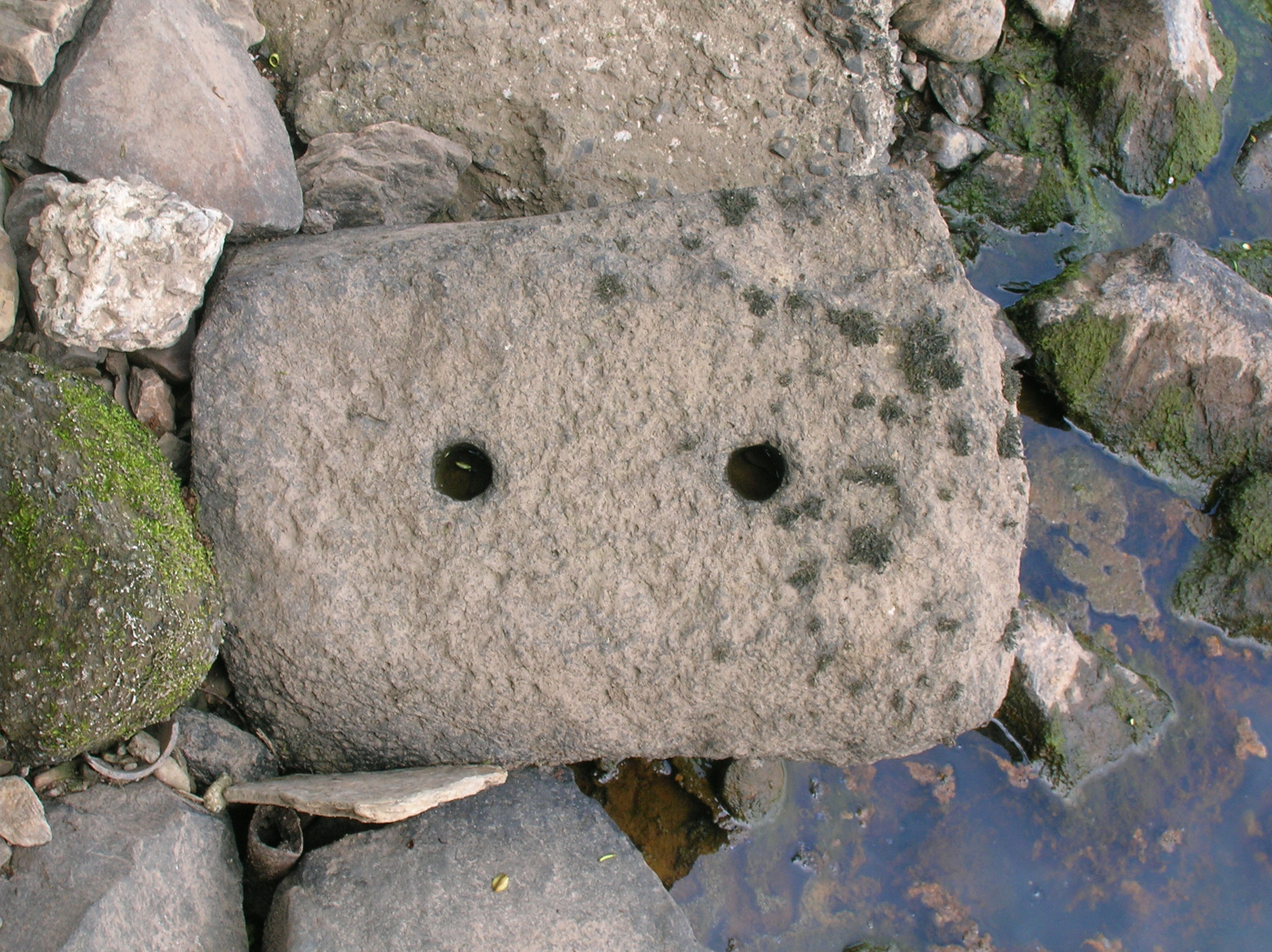
Stone block from the Kilmarnock and Troon Railway

The type of railroad tie used on the predecessors of the first true railway (Liverpool and Manchester Railway) consisted of a pair of stone blocks laid into the ground, with the chairs holding the rails fixed to those blocks. One advantage of this method of construction was that it allowed horses to tread the middle path without the risk of tripping. In railway use with ever heavier locomotives, it was found that it was hard to maintain the correct gauge. The stone blocks were in any case unsuitable on soft ground, such as at Chat Moss, where timber ties had to be used. Bi-block ties with a tie rod are somewhat similar.

=== Wooden ===
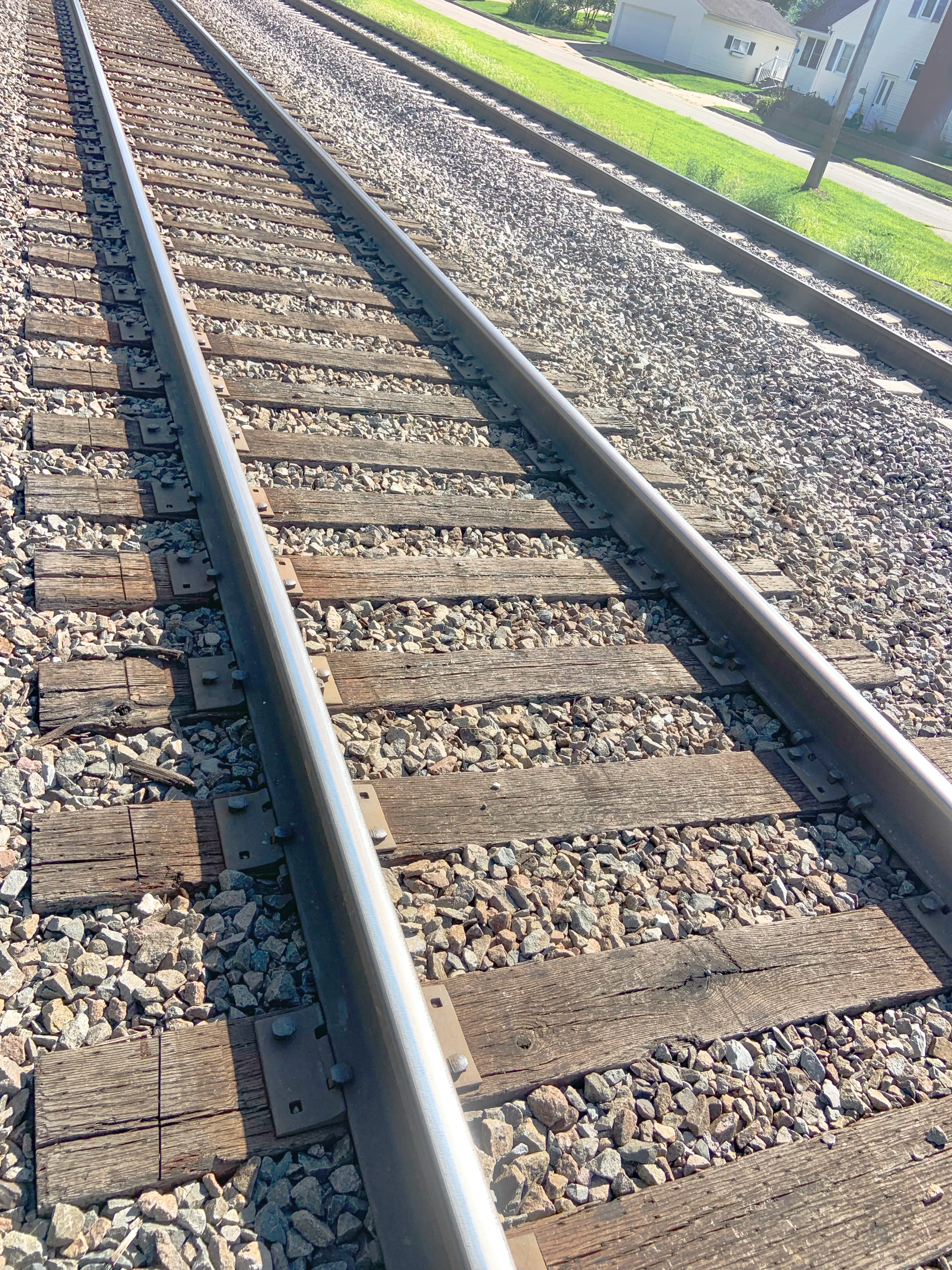
Wood tie on the BNSF Railway in La Crosse, Wisconsin

Historically wooden rail ties were made by hewing with an axe, called axe ties, or sawn to achieve at least two flat sides. A variety of softwood and hardwood timbers are used as ties, oak, jarrah and karri being popular hardwoods, although increasingly difficult to obtain, especially from sustainable sources. Some lines use softwoods, including Douglas fir; while they have the advantage of accepting treatment more readily, they are more susceptible to wear but are cheaper, lighter (and therefore easier to handle) and more readily available.

Softwood is treated, with creosote being the most common preservative for railway ties. Other preservatives used include pentachlorophenol and chromated copper arsenate. Sometimes non-toxic preservatives are used, such as copper azole or micronized copper. New boron-based wood preserving technology is being employed by major US railroads in a dual treatment process in order to extend the life of wood ties in wet areas. Some timbers (such as sal, mora, jarrah or azobé) are durable enough that they can be used untreated.

Problems with wooden ties include rot, splitting, insect infestation, plate-cutting, also known as chair shuffle in the UK (abrasive damage to the tie caused by lateral motion of the tie plate) and spike-pull (where the spike is gradually loosened from the tie). Wooden ties can catch fire; as they age they develop cracks that allow sparks to lodge and more easily start fires.

=== Concrete ===
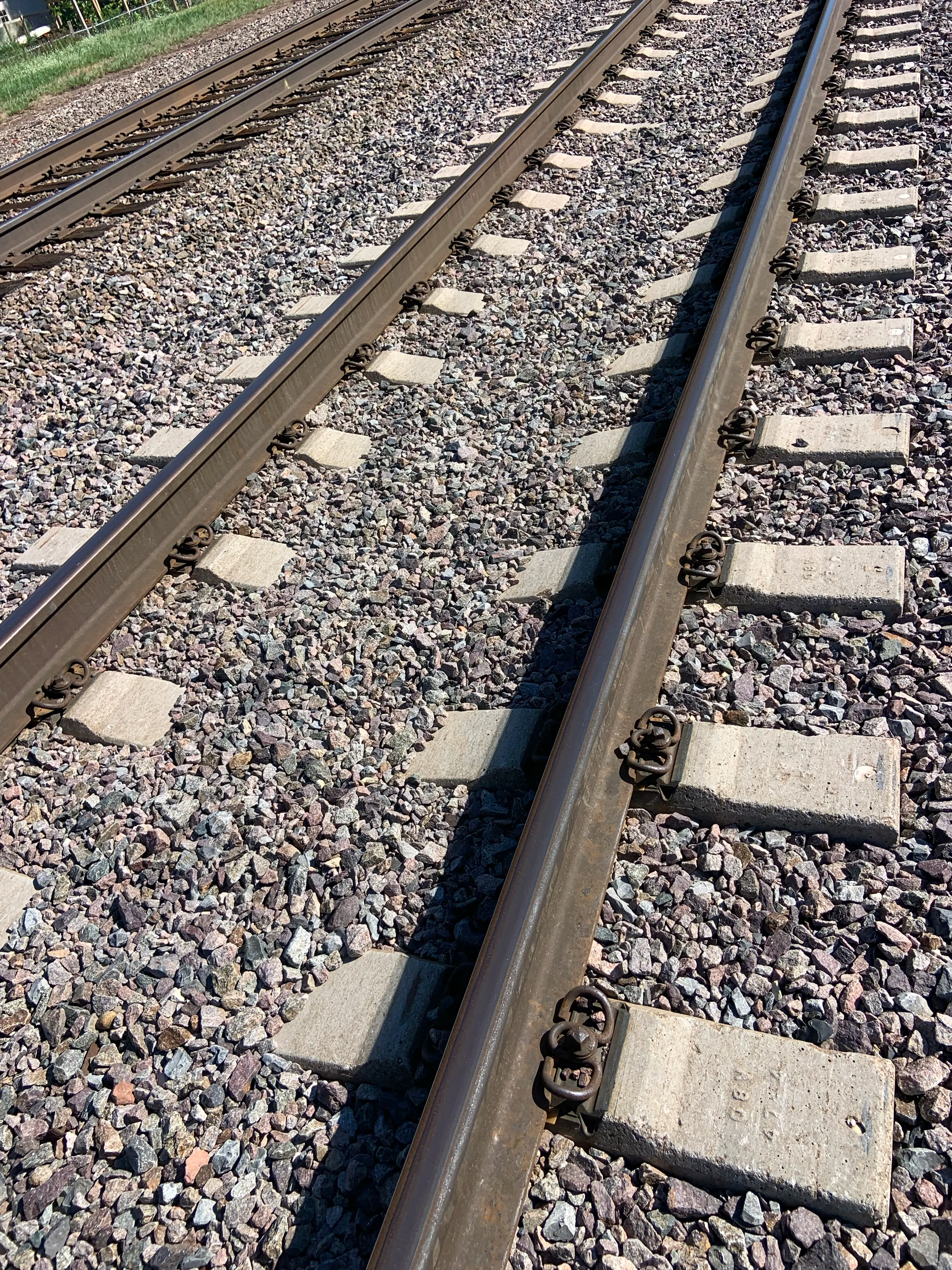
Concrete tie on the BNSF Railway in La Crosse, Wisconsin

Concrete ties are cheaper and easier to obtain than timber and better able to carry higher axle-weights and sustain higher speeds. Their greater weight ensures improved retention of track geometry, especially when installed with continuous-welded rail. Concrete ties have a longer service life and require less maintenance than timber due to their greater weight, which helps them remain in the correct position longer. Concrete ties need to be installed on a well-prepared subgrade with an adequate depth on free-draining ballast to perform well. It is a common misconception that concrete ties amplify wheel noise. A study done as part of Euronoise 2018 proved this false, showing concrete sleepers to be an average of 2dB(A) quieter than wooden ones, however with a greater acoustic sharpness on straight stretches of track. Concrete ties were however shown to be quieter than wooden ties almost universal across the audible frequency band on curves. This causes train noise when over concrete ties to potentially be subjectively perceived as louder than train noise over wooden ties.

On the highest categories of line in the UK (those with the highest speeds and tonnages), pre-stressed concrete ties are the only ones permitted by Network Rail standards.

Most European railways also now use concrete bearers in switches and crossing layouts due to the longer life and lower cost of concrete bearers compared to timber, which is increasingly difficult and expensive to source in sufficient quantities and quality.

=== Steel ===
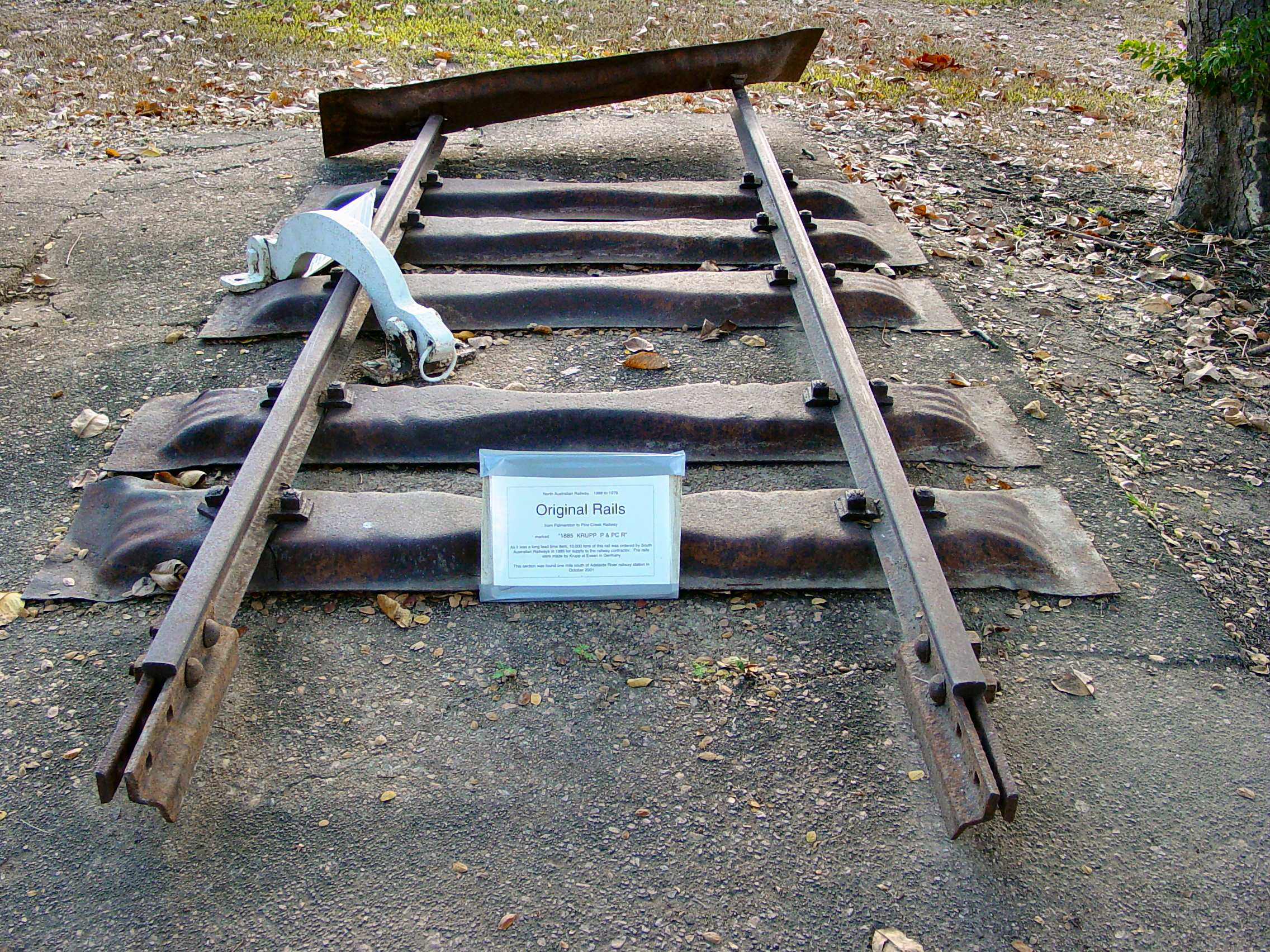
Steel ties

Steel ties are formed from pressed steel and are trough-shaped in section. The ends of the tie are shaped to form a "spade" which increases the lateral resistance of the tie. Housings to accommodate the fastening system are welded to the upper surface of the tie. Steel ties are now in widespread use on secondary or lower-speed lines in the UK where they have been found to be economical to install due their ability to be installed on the existing ballast bed. Steel ties are lighter in weight than concrete and able to stack in compact bundles unlike timber. Steel ties can be installed onto the existing ballast, unlike concrete ties which require a full depth of new ballast. Steel ties are 100% recyclable and require up to 60% less ballast than concrete ties and up to 45% less than wood ties.

Historically, steel ties have suffered from poor design and increased traffic loads over their normally long service life. These aged and often obsolete designs limited load and speed capacity but can still be found in many locations globally and performing adequately despite decades of service. There are great numbers of steel ties with over 50 years of service and in some cases they can and have been rehabilitated and continue to perform well. Steel ties were also used in specialty situations, such as the Hejaz railway in the Arabian Peninsula where the dry, hot climate made wood ties unsatisfactory.

Modern steel ties handle heavy loads, and handle adverse track conditions. Of high importance to railroad companies is the fact that steel ties are more economical to install in new construction than creosote-treated wood ties and concrete ties. Steel ties are utilized in nearly all sectors of the worldwide railroad systems including heavy-haul, class 1s, regional, shortlines, mining, electrified passenger lines (OHLE) and all manner of industries. Notably, steel ties (bearers) have proven themselves over the last few decades to be advantageous in turnouts (switches/points) and provide the solution to the ever-growing problem of long timber ties for such use.

When insulated to prevent conduction through the ties, steel ties may be used with track circuit based train detection and track integrity systems. Without insulation, steel ties may only be used on lines without block signaling and level crossings or on lines that use other forms of train detection such as axle counters.

=== Plastics ===
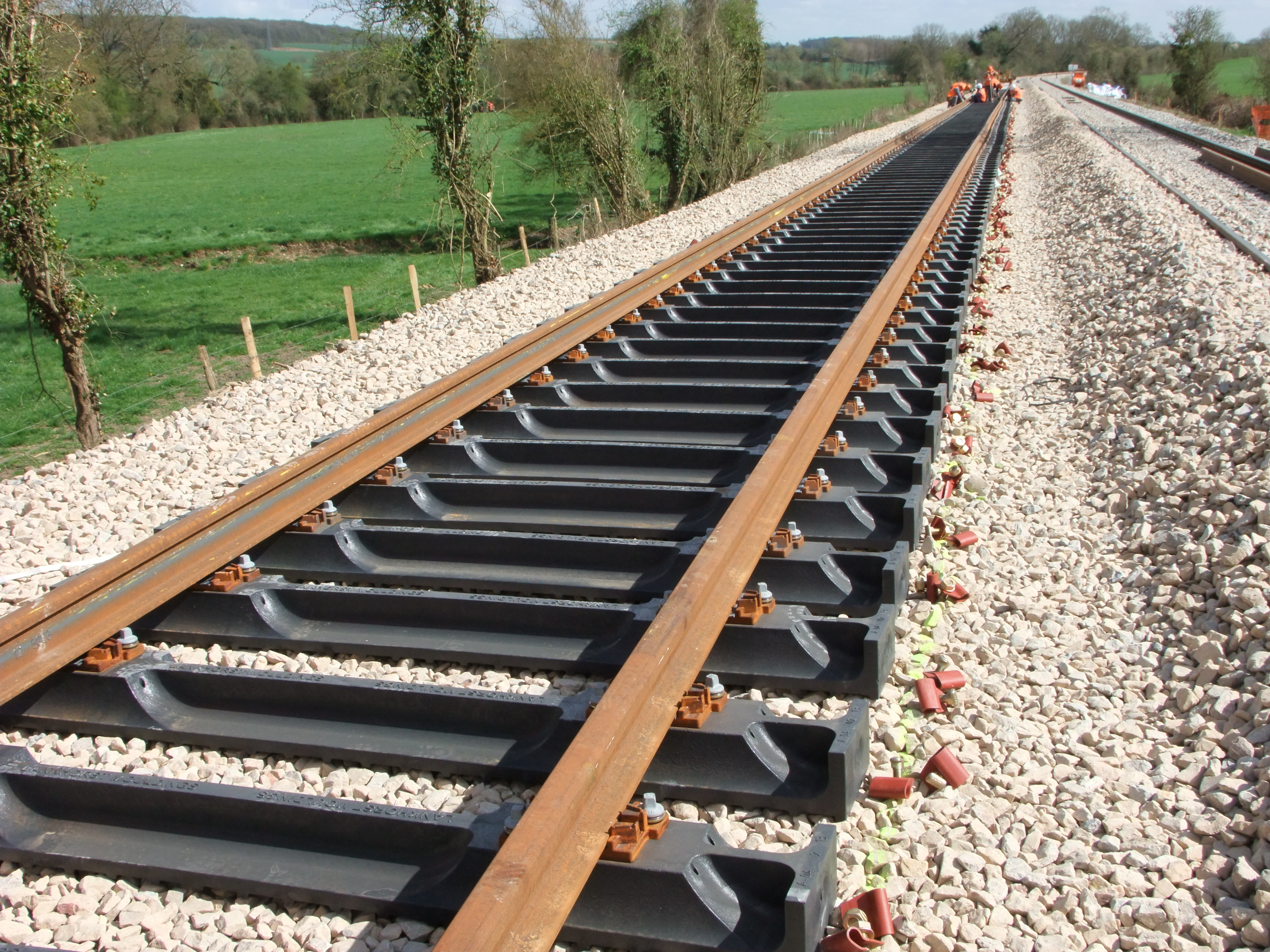
KLP Hybrid Plastic Railroad Tie

In more recent times, a number of companies are selling composite railroad ties manufactured from recycled plastic resins and recycled rubber. Manufacturers claim a service life longer than wooden ties with an expected lifetime in the range of 30–80 years, that the ties are impervious to rot and insect attack, and that they can be modified with a special relief on the bottom to provide additional lateral stability. In some main track applications the hybrid plastic tie has a recessed design to be completely surrounded by ballast.

Aside from the environmental benefits of using recycled material, plastic ties usually replace timber ties soaked in creosote, the latter being a toxic chemical, and are theoretically recyclable. However, plastics may shed microplastics and leach other possibly toxic chemicals such as ultraviolet inhibitors.

Hybrid plastic railroad ties and composite ties are used in other rail applications such as underground mining operations, industrial zones, humid environments and densely populated areas. Hybrid railroad ties are also used to replace individual rotted wood ties, which will result in intermingled hybrid and wood ties and continuous track stiffness. Hybrid plastic ties and composite ties also offer benefits on bridges and viaducts, because they lead to better distribution of forces and reduction of vibrations into respectively bridge girders or the ballast. This is due to better damping properties of hybrid plastic ties and composite ties, which will decrease the intensity of vibrations as well as the sound production. In 2009, Network Rail announced that it would begin replacing wooden ties with recycled plastic, but I-Plas became insolvent in October 2012.

In 2012, New Zealand ordered a trial batch of "EcoTrax" brand recycled composite ties from Axion for use on turnouts and bridges, and a further three-year order in 2015, but then Axion filed for bankruptcy in December 2015, though it continues to trade. These ties are developed by Dr. Nosker at Rutgers University.

Composite sleepers, manufactured from various recycled plastics, were introduced in Wiltshire, United Kingdom, in 2021. They were installed as an alternative to wooden sleepers on a bridge where concrete sleepers would have been too heavy. Although it was the first instance of plastic sleepers being installed on mainline track in the country, they have previously been used on narrow-gauge railways. Composite recycled plastic sleepers are seen as an arm of Network Rail's sustainability rollout.

Ties may also be made from fiberglass.

=== Wheel timbers ===
Wheel timbers are used in places where additional structural support is needed, such as bridges, or under points. Crossing timbers are placed perpendicular to the rail, and are longer or wider than traditional railway sleepers. When used on a bridge, they may be joined to the bridge and provide part of the structural strength of the bridge. Waybeams or longitudinal wheel timbers are wheel timbers that are laid parallel to the track in place of the track ballast, typically on bridges..

== Non-conventional tie forms ==
=== Y-shaped ties ===
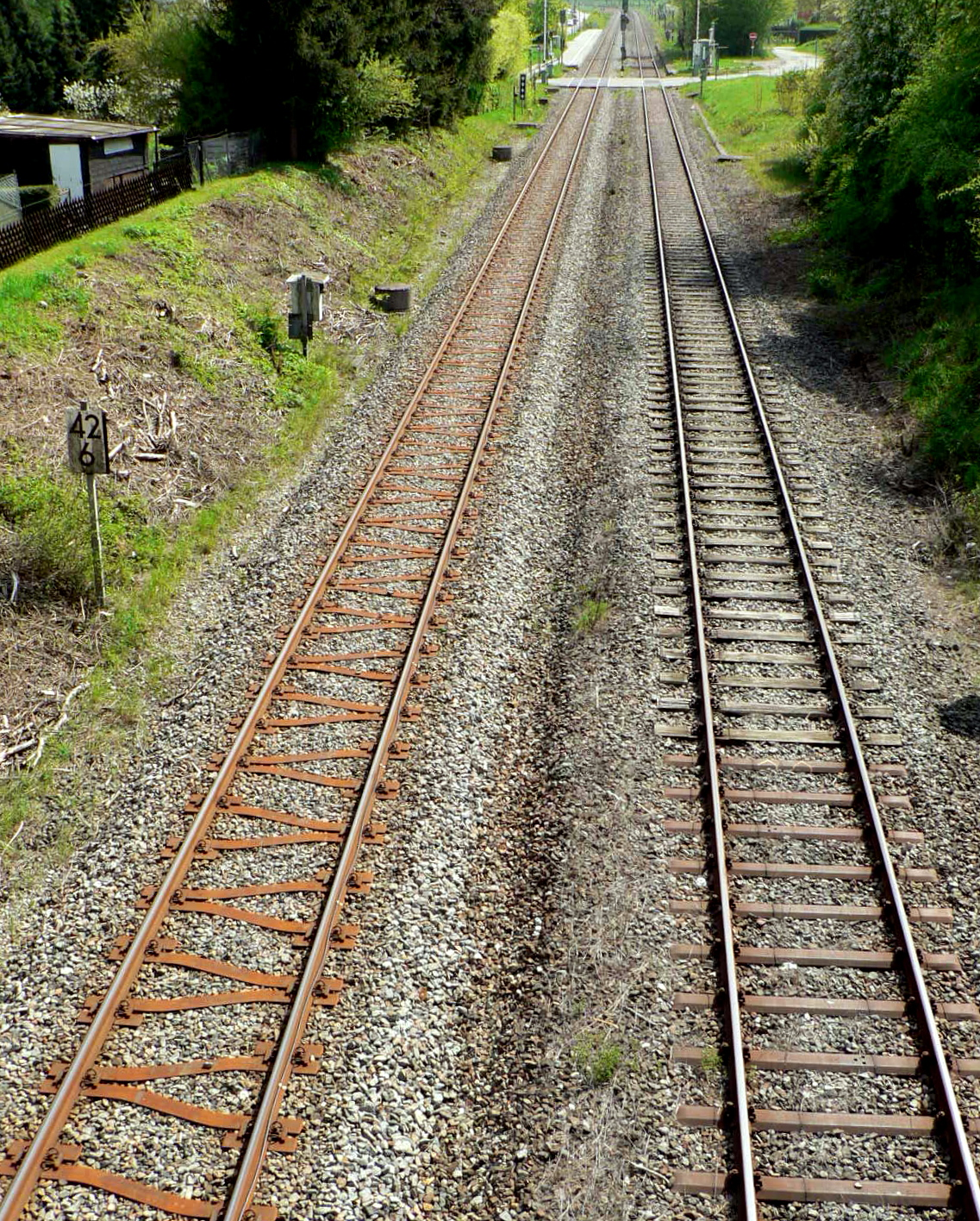
Y tie track next to conventional track

An unusual form of tie is the Y-shaped tie, first developed in 1983. Compared to conventional ties, the volume of ballast required is reduced due to the load-spreading characteristics of the Y-tie. Noise levels are high but the resistance to track movement is very good. For curves the three-point contact of a Y steel tie means that an exact geometric fit cannot be observed with a fixed attachment point.

The cross section of the ties is an I-beam.

As of 2006, less than 1,000 km (621 mi) of Y-tie track had been built, of which approximately 90 percent is in Germany.

=== Twin ties ===
The ZSX Twin tie is manufactured by Leonhard Moll Betonwerke GmbH & Co KG and is a pair of two pre-stressed concrete ties longitudinally connected by four steel rods. The design is said to be suitable for track with sharp curves, track subject to temperature stress such as that operated by trains with eddy brakes, and bridges, and as transition track between traditional track and slab track or bridges.

=== Wide ties ===
Concrete monoblock ties have also been produced in a wider form (e.g. 57 cm or 22 1/2 in) such that there is no ballast between the ties; this wide tie increases lateral resistance and reduces ballast pressure. The system has been used in Germany where wide ties have also been used in conjunction with the GETRAC A3 ballastless track systems.

=== Bi-block ties ===
Twin block sleeper

Bi-block (or twinblock) ties consist of two concrete rail supports joined by a steel bar. Advantages include increased lateral resistance and lower weight than monobloc concrete ties, as well as elimination of damage from torsional forces on the ties center due to the more flexible steel connections. This tie type is in common use in France, and are used on the high-speed TGV lines. Bi-block ties are also used in ballastless track systems. They are gauge-convertible by cutting and welding the steel bar to the dimension that suits the new gauge.

=== Frame ties ===
Frame ties (German: Rahmenschwelle) comprise both lateral and longitudinal members in a single monolithic concrete casting. This system is in use in Austria; in the Austrian system the track is fastened at the four corners of the frame, and is also supported midway along the frame. Adjacent frame ties are butted close to each other. Advantages of this system over conventional cross increased support of track. In addition, construction methods used for this type of track are similar to those used for conventional track.

=== Ladder track ===
In ladder track, the ties are laid parallel to the rails and are several meters long. The structure is similar to Brunel's baulk track; these longitudinal ties can be used with ballast, or with elastomer supports on a solid non-ballasted support.

== Dimensions and spacing ==
=== Current usage ===
==== North America ====
The crosstie spacing of mainline railroad is approximately 19 to 19.5 inches (48 to 50 cm) for wood ties or 24 inches (61 cm) for concrete ties. The number of ties is 3,250 wooden crossties per mile (2,019 ties/km, or 40 ties per 65 feet) for wood ties or 2,640 ties per mile for concrete ties.

=== Historical usage ===
==== United Kingdom ====
The London, Midland and Scottish Railway specified 18 sleepers per 45-foot (13.7 m) rail and 24 sleepers per 60-foot (18.3 m) rail, both of which correspond to 2,112 sleepers per mile.

Sleepers are 8 ft 6 in (2.59 m) long, 10 inches (0.25 m) wide and 5 inches (0.13 m) deep. The two sleepers adjacent to a joint may be 12 inches (0.30 m) wide where the formation is soft or the traffic is heavy and fast. Sleepers are mostly spaced 2 ft 7 in (0.79 m) apart (centre-to-centre) but are closer adjacent to fishplated rail joints where the spacing sequences are as follows with the spacing at the fishplate highlighted.

Sleeper spacing at joints
45-foot (13.7 m) rails	60-foot (18.3 m) rails
2 ft 7 in (0.79 m)	2 ft 7 in (0.79 m)
2 ft 7 in (0.79 m)	2 ft 5 in (0.74 m)
2 ft 5 in (0.74 m)	2 ft 4 in (0.71 m)
2 ft 3 1/2 in (0.699 m)	2 ft 3 1/2 in (0.699 m)
2 ft 0 1/4 in (0.616 m)	2 ft 0 5/16 in (0.618 m)
2 ft 3 1/2 in (0.699 m)	2 ft 3 1/2 in (0.699 m)
2 ft 5 in (0.74 m)	2 ft 4 in (0.71 m)
2 ft 7 in (0.79 m)	2 ft 5 in (0.74 m)
2 ft 7 in (0.79 m)	2 ft 7 in (0.79 m)

The fractional inch spacing at the fishplate corresponds to the thermal expansion gap allowed between the rail ends.

- 45-foot (13.7 m) rails – 1/4 in (6.4 mm)
- 60-foot (18.3 m) rails – 5/16 in (7.9 mm)

==== United States ====
Interurban railways of the late 1800s and early 1900s generally ran lighter rolling stock than mainline steam railways, but roadbeds were built to similar standards. Wooden ties were placed at approximately 2-foot (0.61 m) intervals.

== Fastening rails to railroad ties ==
Various methods exist for fixing the rail to the railroad ties. Historically spikes gave way to cast iron chairs fixed to the tie, more recently springs (such as Pandrol clips) are used to fix the rail to the tie chair.

== Other uses ==
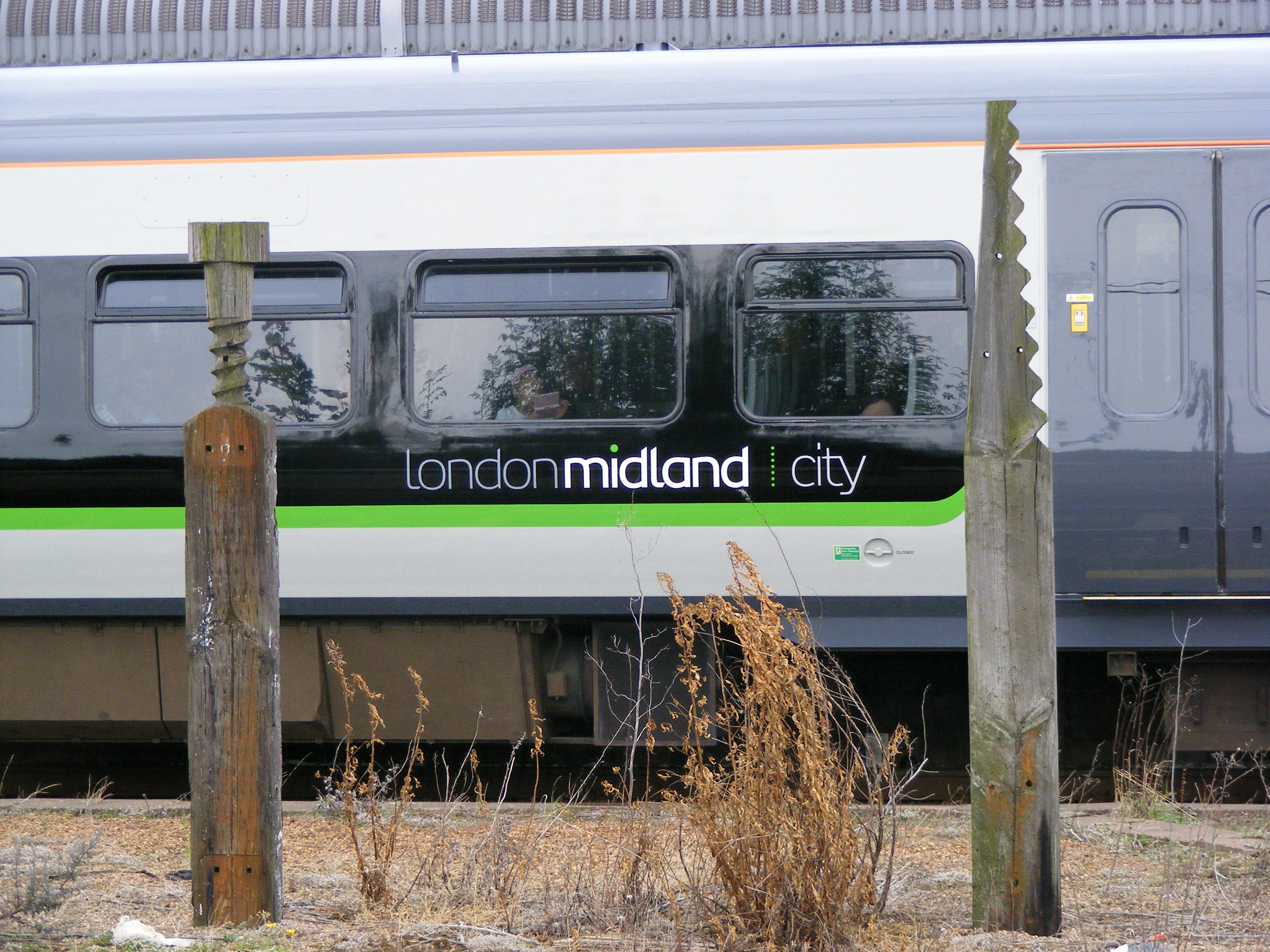
Wooden ties recycled as sculptures at Northfield railway station

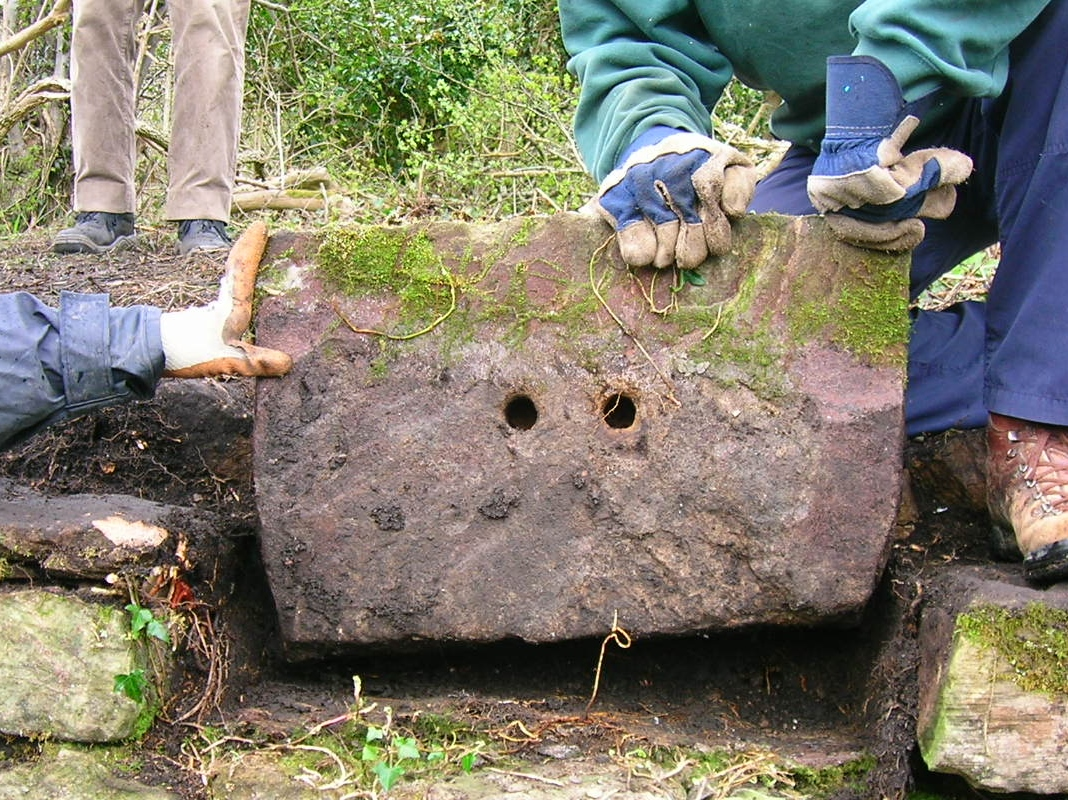
Stone block from the Scotch gauge Ardrossan Railway used to construct a loading dock

In recent years, wooden railroad ties have also become popular for gardening and landscaping, both in creating retaining walls and raised-bed gardens, and sometimes for building steps as well. Traditionally, the ties sold for this purpose are decommissioned ties taken from rail lines when replaced with new ties, and their lifespan is often limited due to rot. Some entrepreneurs sell new ties. Due to the presence of wood preservatives such as coal tar, creosote or salts of heavy metals, railroad ties introduce an extra element of soil pollution into gardens and are avoided by many property owners. In the UK, new oak or pine beams of the same length (2.4m) as standard railway sleepers, but not treated with dangerous chemicals, are available specifically for garden construction. In some places, railroad ties have been used in the construction of homes, particularly among those with lower incomes, especially near railroad tracks, including railroad employees. They are also used as cribbing for docks and boathouses.

The Spanish artist Agustín Ibarrola has used recycled ties from Renfe in several projects.

Most existing railway networks in West Africa rely on legacy infrastructure, featuring narrow gauges and outdated timber or steel sleepers that limit train speeds and load capacities. Modernizing this network requires the adoption of standard-gauge tracks fitted with prestressed concrete sleepers, which offer superior durability, track stability, and resistance to tropical weather conditions. Integrating these modern track technologies and structural components is essential for establishing a resilient, high-capacity regional transit system capable of supporting heavy freight and high-speed passenger services across the continent.

In Germany, use of wooden railroad ties as building material (namely in gardens, houses and in all places where regular contact to human skin would be likely, in all areas frequented by children and in all areas associated with the production or handling of food in any way) has been prohibited by law since 1991 because they pose a significant risk to health and environment. From 1991 to 2002, this was regulated by the Teerölverordnung (Carbolineum By-law), and since 2002 has been regulated by the Chemikalien-Verbotsverordnung (Chemicals Prohibition By-law), §1 and Annex, Parts 10 and 17.

== See also ==
- Ballastless track
- John Calvin Jureit, inventor of the Gang-Nail truss connector plate
- Ladder track
- Track (rail transport)
- Sun kink
