= John Calvin Jureit =

American inventor

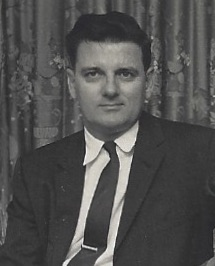
- Inventor of the Gang-Nail connector plate and Founder/Chairman/CEO of Automated Building Components, Inc. of Miami, Florida
- Born: July 24, 1918; Baltimore, Maryland, US
- Died: September 9, 2005 (aged 87); Stuart, Florida, US
- Education: Civil Engineering
- Alma mater: Georgia Institute of Technology
- Occupation: Chairman/CEO
- Spouse(s): Mildred Hildebrand (m. 1946–2001) Marie Garritson (m. 2003–2005)
- Children: Glenn, Kenneth, Robert
- Parent(s): William F. Jureit, Sr. Lillian E. Jureit

John Calvin Jureit (July 24, 1918 – September 9, 2005) was an American civil engineer and the inventor of the Gang Nail connector plate, used in building construction specifically for the joining of timber truss joints of roof, floor trusses and prefabricated wall panels. This invention has been widely credited for the boom in affordable housing, productivity increases and improved building durability throughout the world. He went on to be one of the founders and the first president of the Truss Plate Institute (TPI) and built Automated Building Components, Inc. with headquarters in Miami, Florida into a publicly traded company on the American Stock Exchange and the worldwide industry leader in truss plate manufacturing, truss manufacturing, truss press/saw machinery and computerized engineering and design.

== Early life ==
John Calvin ("Cal") Jureit (pronounced Jury-it) was born in Baltimore, Maryland to Lillian E. and William F. Jureit Sr. His father was a baker who emigrated to the United States from Germany prior to the start of WWI and before J. Calvin was born. In 1922, his parents along with him and his younger brother Bill moved to Miami, Florida, where his father's bakery flourished.

== Military service ==
After graduating from Miami Senior High School in 1935, Jureit studied art before enrolling at the University of Miami to study accounting and chemistry. In 1942, Jureit enlisted in the Navy Seabees and was stationed at Camp Peary near Williamsburg, Virginia. There he met his future wife, Mildred Hildebrand, who was working as a secretary at the local USO, went on to work at Georgia Tech to help Cal get an engineering degree and would ultimately join Cal on the Board of Directors of Automated Building Components, Inc.

Jureit was trained as a cartographer and sent to Australia, where he was assigned the job of making relief maps from plywood and clay for use as pilot briefing tools during WWII. Following his six-month stint in Australia, he was sent to New Guinea for an additional six months. Jureit never saw combat but the experience sharpened his desire to become an engineer.

== Gang-Nail, Inc. ==
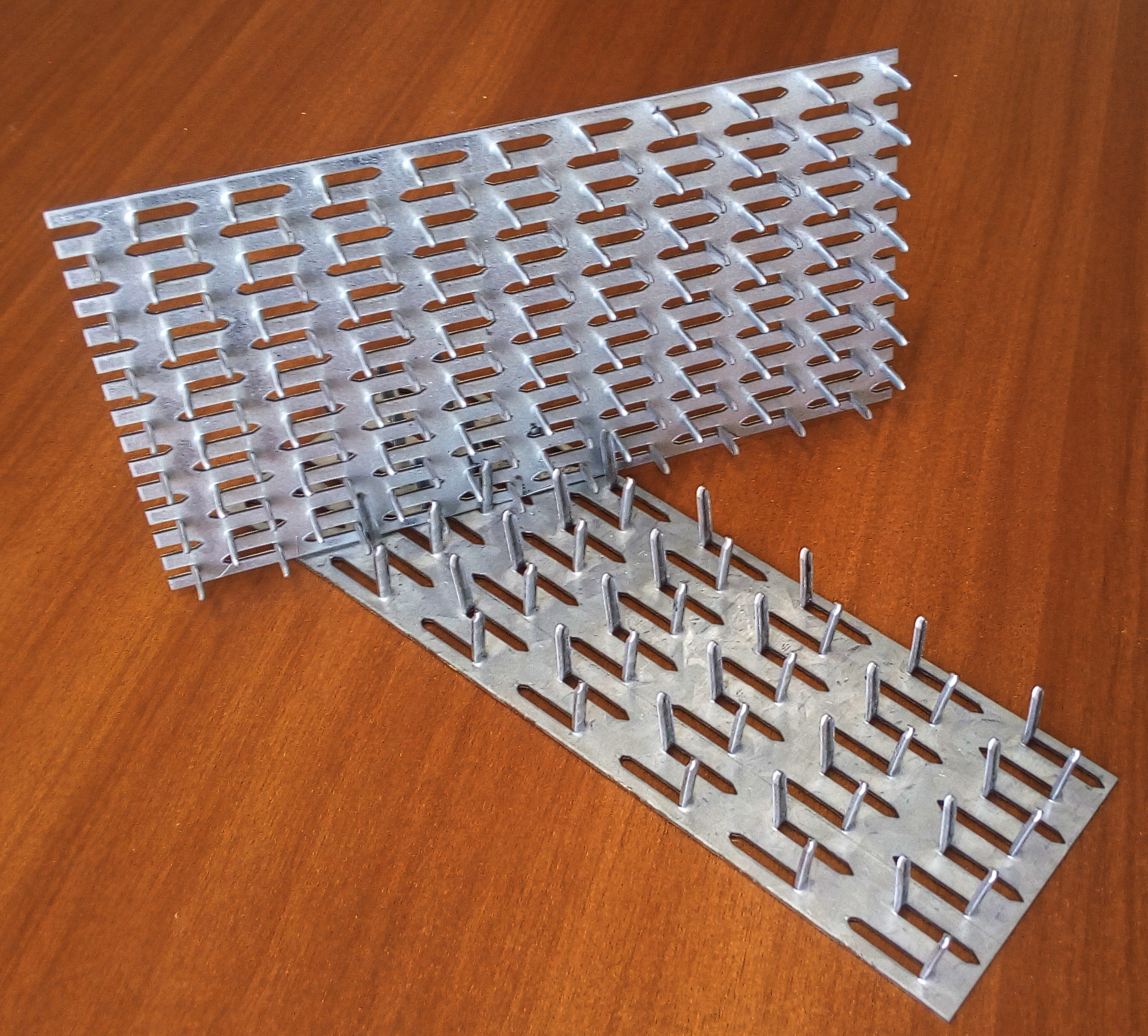
Gang-Nail Connector Plates

Upon his discharge at the end of World War II, Jureit enrolled at Georgia Tech on the G.I. Bill and studied engineering. After graduating as a Civil Engineer he was briefly employed in the roof truss industry prior to leaving it and starting Jureit & Associates, Inc. a soils and foundation engineering firm. In 1955, Jureit developed and patented the most famous version of his Gang-Nail connector plate, the first metal tie that required no nails, screws or glue. The Gang-Nail plate is a sheet of galvanized steel with triangular pointed prongs that are stamped out and bent perpendicular to the plate face, allowing it to be hammered or pressed into a number of surfaces simultaneously. Starting with this patent, Jureit founded Gang-Nail, Inc in 1956, later renamed Automated Building Components, Inc. (ABC) in the early 1960s and was Chairman & CEO until his retirement in 1979. Through Cal's persuasion his brother William ("Bill") F. Jureit, an attorney and accountant, left his law practice in the early 1960s to join ABC as Executive Vice President until becoming CEO in 1979. Bill Jureit retired in 1987.

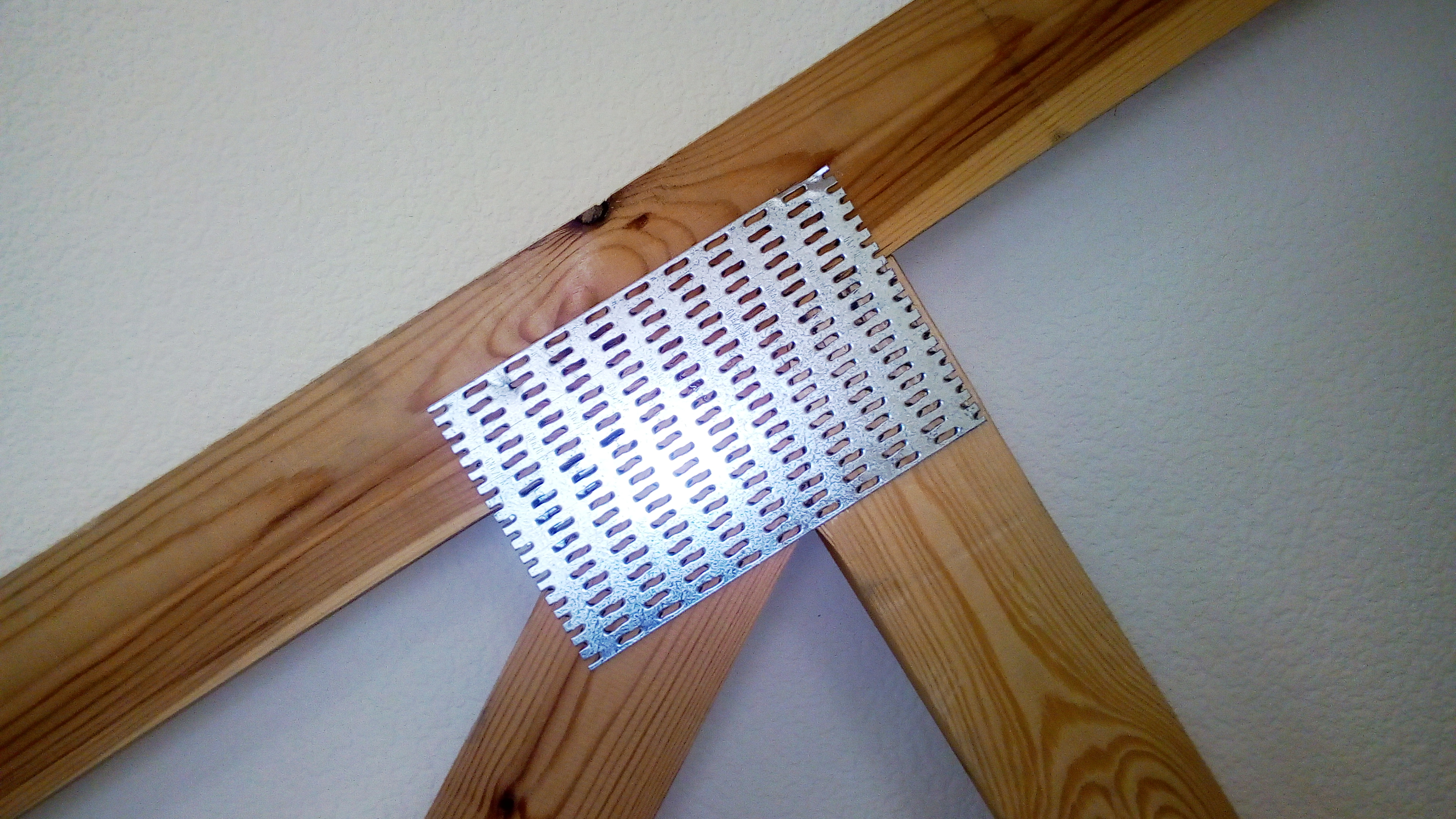
Gang-Nail imbedded in truss joint

Prior to his invention, roof truss production was difficult and time-consuming, requiring highly skilled carpenters to make precise cuts and toe-nail two adjoining pieces of wood together. Small mistakes would cause serious time delays as well as weaken the truss. The improved strength of the Gang-Nail plate was evidenced in 1992 when Hurricane Andrew destroyed many homes in South Florida but homes built with Gang-Nail plates were far more likely to survive than those with toe-nailed trusses. Gang-Nails are also used in the manufacturing of floor trusses, premanufactured wall panels, modular housing and mobile home trusses.

Additionally, Gang-Nails are also used to strengthen the ends of railroad sleepers, reducing their tendency to split when spikes are driven into them.

In an interview with the Georgia Tech alumni newsletter, John A. White, former dean of engineering at the Georgia Institute of Technology, commented that "The whole notion about affordable housing and productivity increases came about because of [Jureit's] invention." In the same article, Jureit stated that the idea for the connector plate came to him during a church service.

== Business ==

Automated Building Components, Inc went public in 1961 and grew to be the largest company in its industry having operations around the world manufacturing connector plates, machinery, roof/floor trusses, and roof tile, as well as providing computerized engineering services. By 1979 the company employed over 1000 people and had in excess of 2000 Fabricators (customers). It was acquired by Redlands Corporation (a large European manufacturer of cement roof tiles) in January 1979 where the name was changed to Gang-Nail Systems, Inc to protect its Gang-Nail trademark. It was later sold again, merged with Hydro-Air Engineering, Inc. (another truss plate manufacturer) and renamed MiTek. MiTek was ultimately acquired by famed investor Warren Buffett's Berkshire Hathaway on July 31, 2001.

== Later life ==
After retirement Jureit spent most of his time with his wife Mildred & three sons traveling between their homes in NC and FL. He was given the honor of being inducted into the Engineering Hall Of Fame at Georgia Tech in 1996 where he graduated with a degree in Civil Engineering in 1949. He also offered his time on the board of a couple of non-profit organizations and was heavily involved in church activity. Additionally, he continued his interest in his love of Pipe organs and the music they create as his Coral Gables home was built around one back in the mid-1960s. He and Mildred moved to Stuart, Florida in 1999 where he built another home at the age of 83 and was the engineer overseeing its construction. Jureit's first wife, Mildred, died in 2001. Jureit later married Dr. Marie Garritson. In 2005, J. Calvin Jureit died at age 87 from head injuries sustained as the result of a fall.
