= Broadaxe =

Type of axe with a large head that is primarily used as a tool

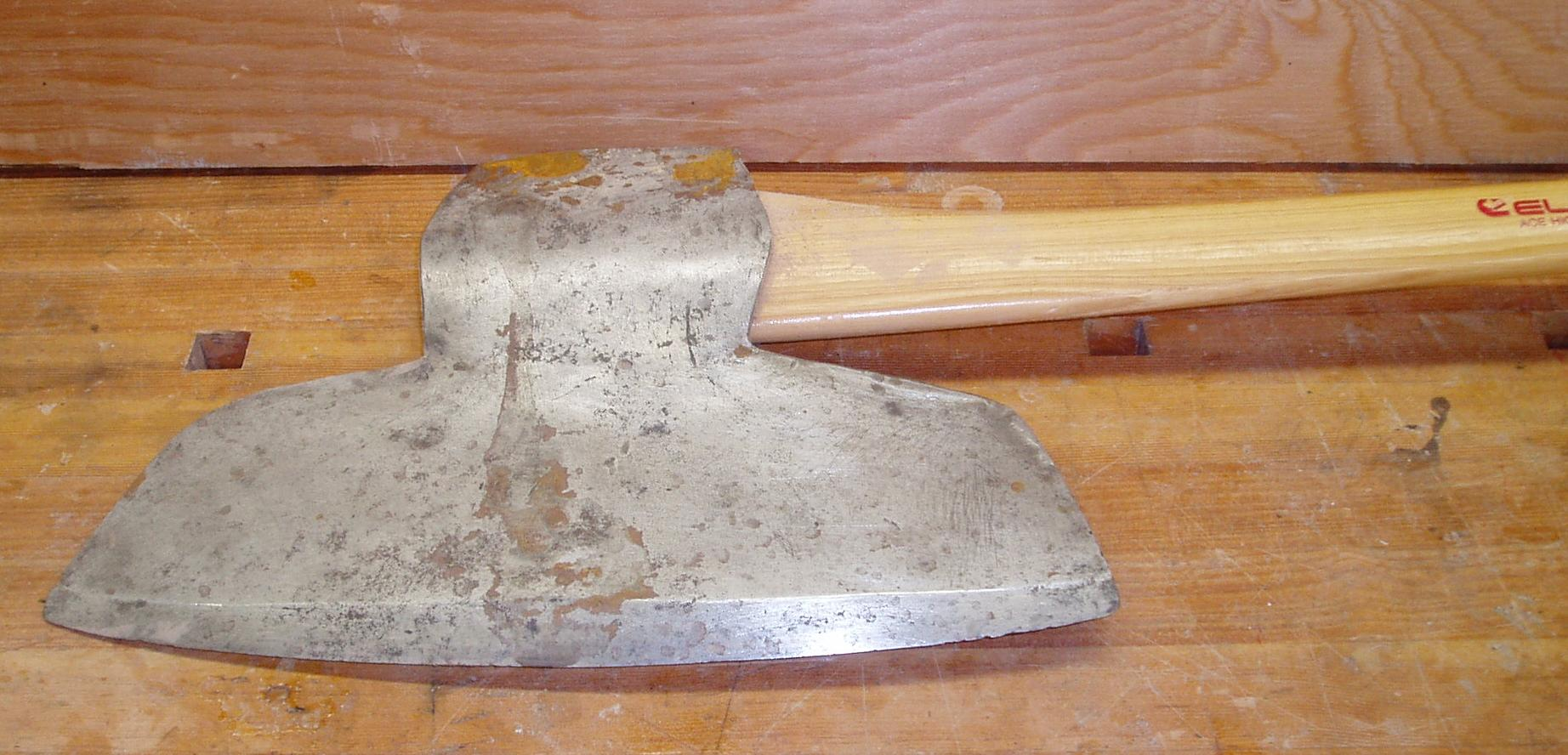
A very large, single-bevel broadaxe

A broadaxe is a large broad-headed axe. There are two categories of cutting edge on broadaxes, both are used for shaping logs into beams by hewing. On one type, one side is flat, and the other side beveled, a basilled edge, also called a side axe, single bevel, or chisle-edged axe. On the other type, both sides are beveled, sometimes called a double bevel axe, which produces a scalloped cut.

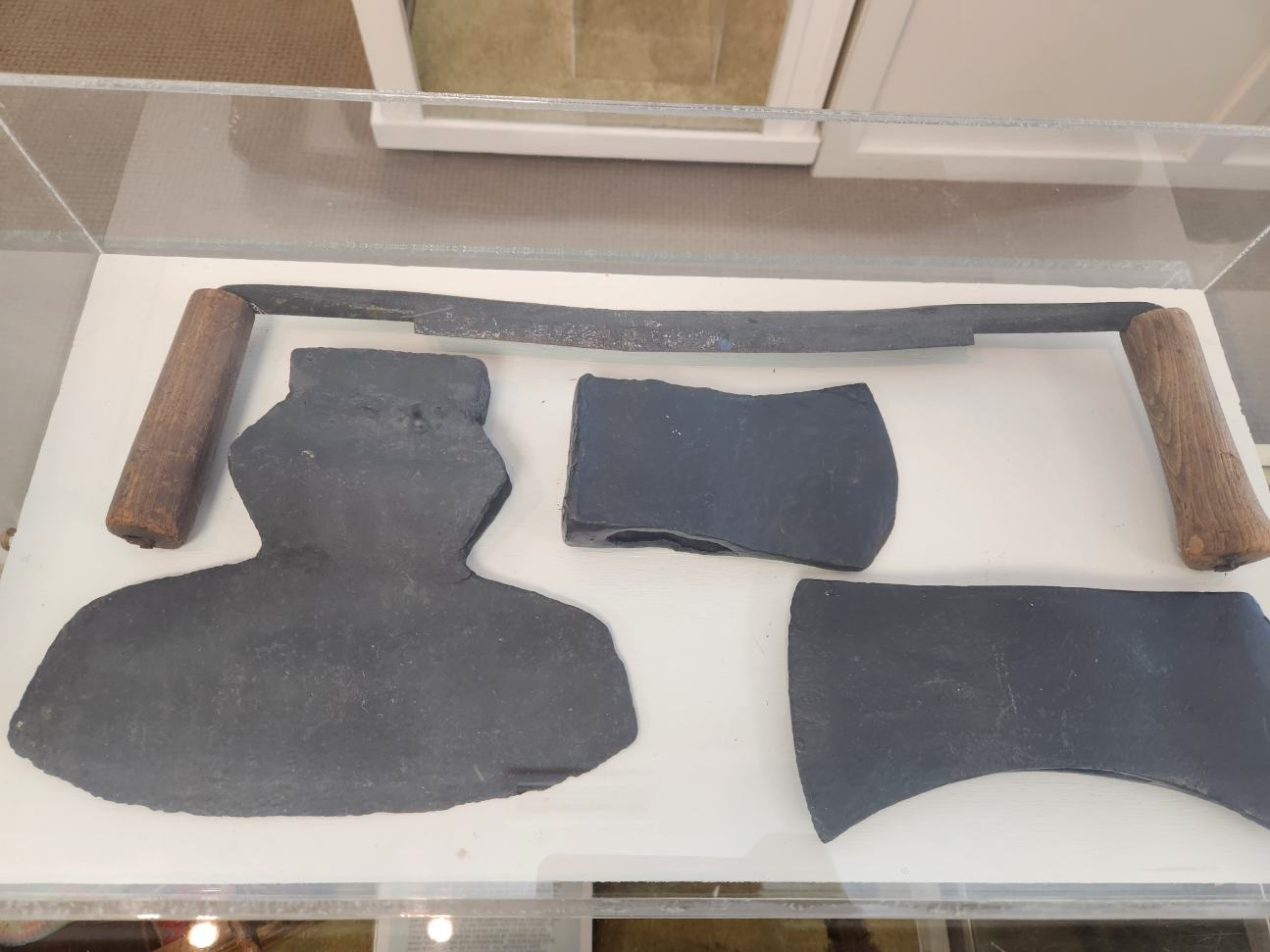
American broadaxe circa 1800

On the basilled broadaxe the handle may curve away from the flat side to allow an optimal stance by the hewer in relation to the hewn surface, and to allow clearance for the hewer's hands. The flat blade is to make the surface flat but can only be worked from one direction and is right-handed or left-handed. The double bevel axe has a straight handle and can be swung with either side against the wood. A double-beveled broad axe can be used for chopping or notching as well as hewing. When used for hewing, notches are chopped in the side of the log down to a marked line, a process called scoring. The pieces of wood between these notches are removed with an axe, a process called joggling, and then the remaining wood is hewn to the line.

== History ==
Broad axes have been used since ancient times until the end of the 19th century in Europe and North America. Broadaxes were commonly used in manufacture of square timbers for wooden shipbuilding, log building, timber framing, and railroad ties sometimes called axe ties. Some broad axes are of a shape where part of the axe is called a beard so the axe is called a long-bearded axe.

== Modern uses ==
Since the introduction of sawmills and modern power tools, the use of this tool is now uncommon in manufacturing but still used in restoration carpentry or undeveloped regions.

== Gallery ==
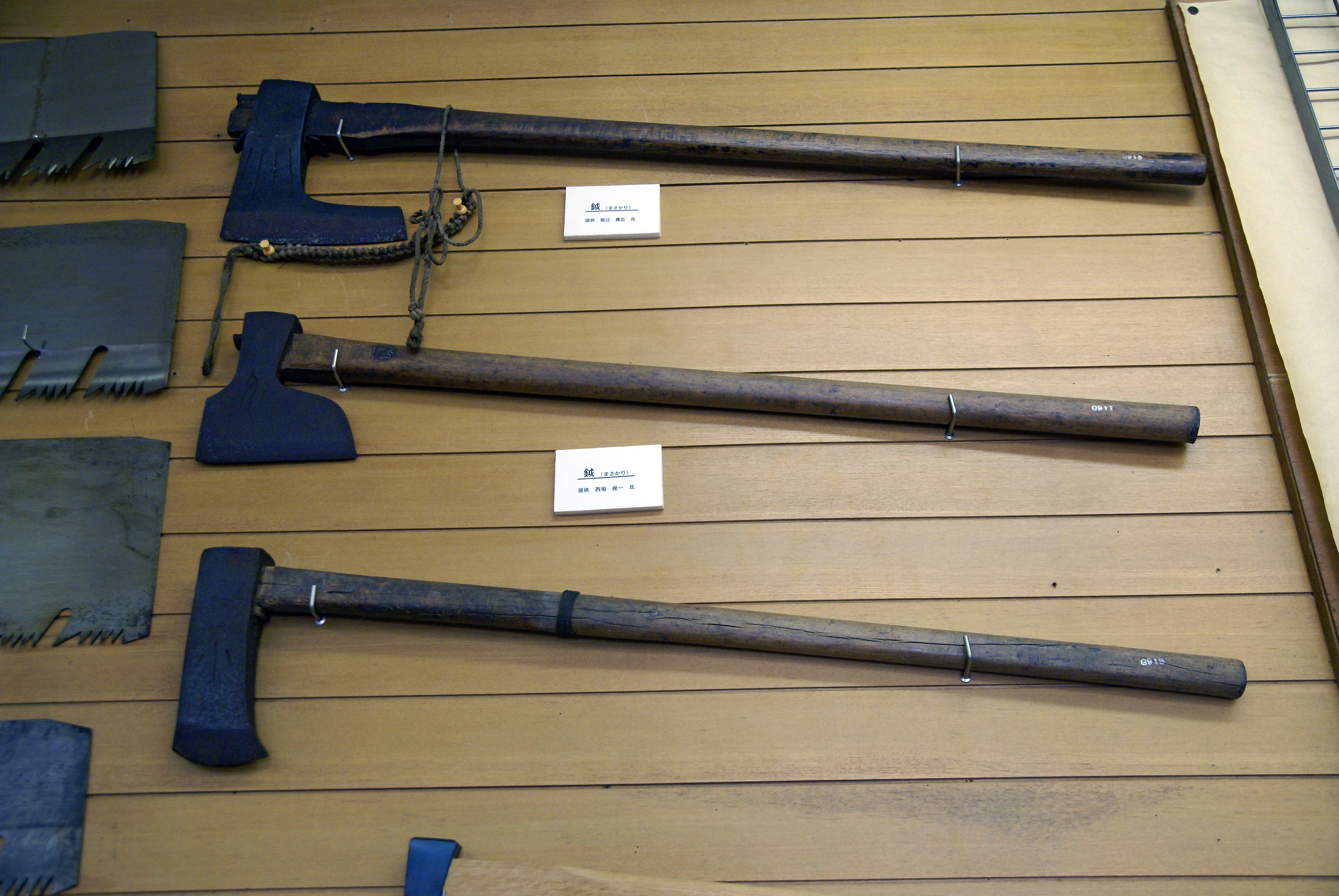
Traditional Japanese axes in the Miki City Hardware Museum

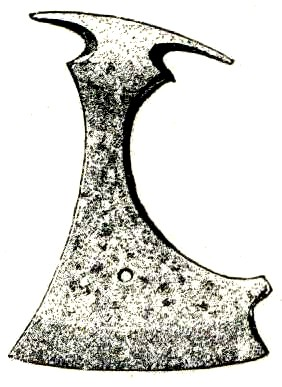
Axe of iron from Swedish Iron Age, found at Gotland, Sweden

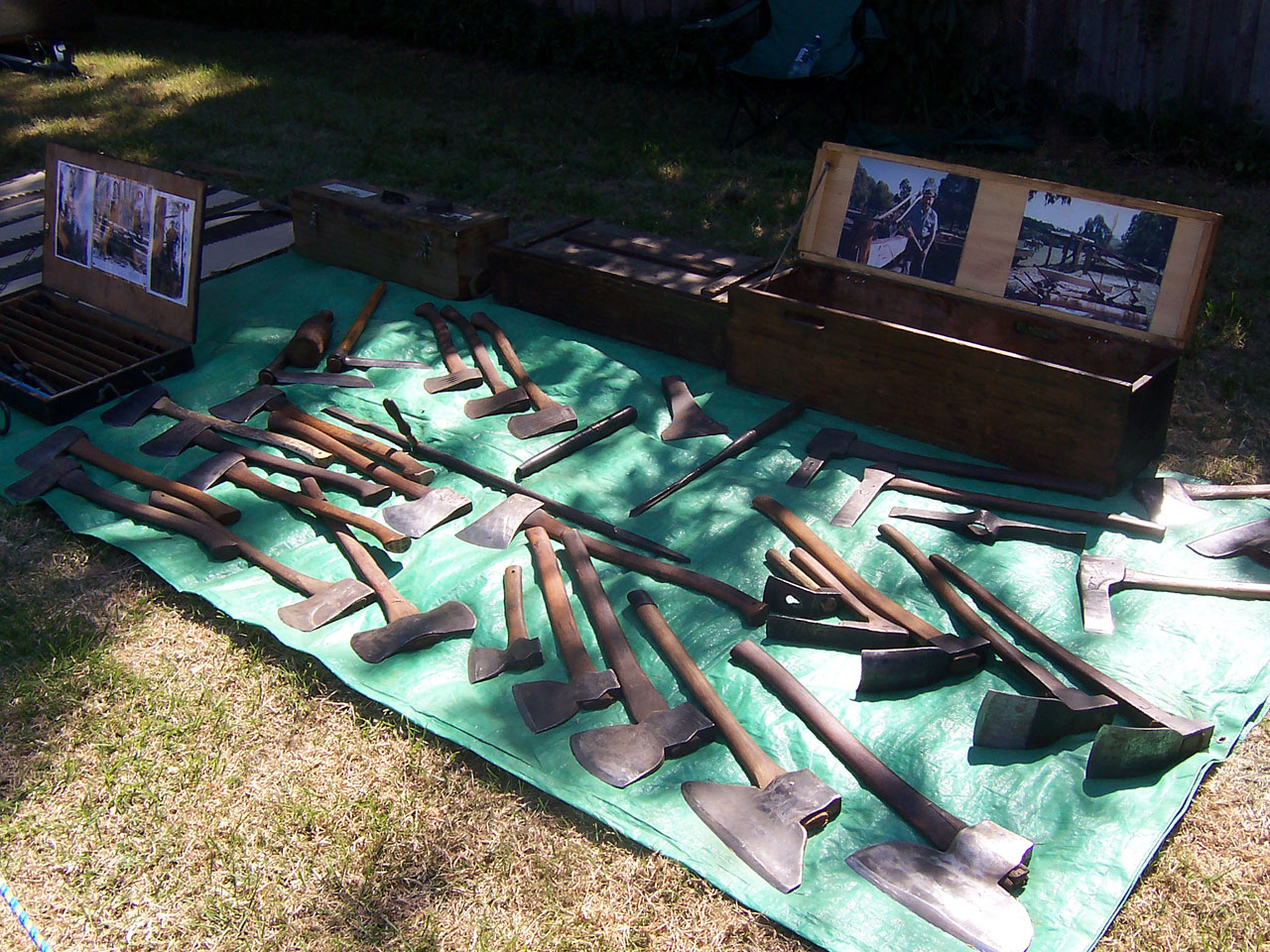
Several types and sizes of axes, broad axes and a broad hatchet in lower right corner

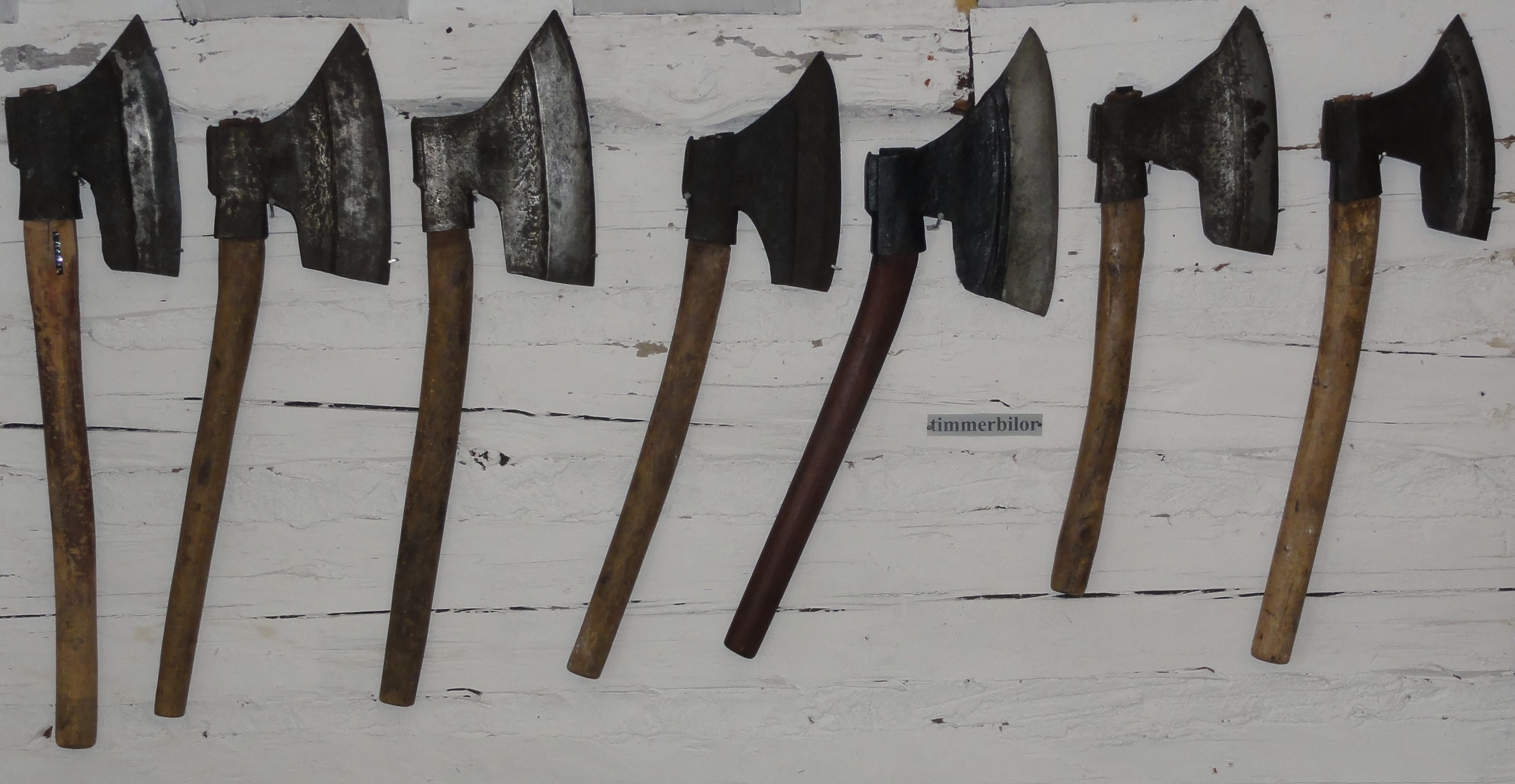
Broad axes in Sweden

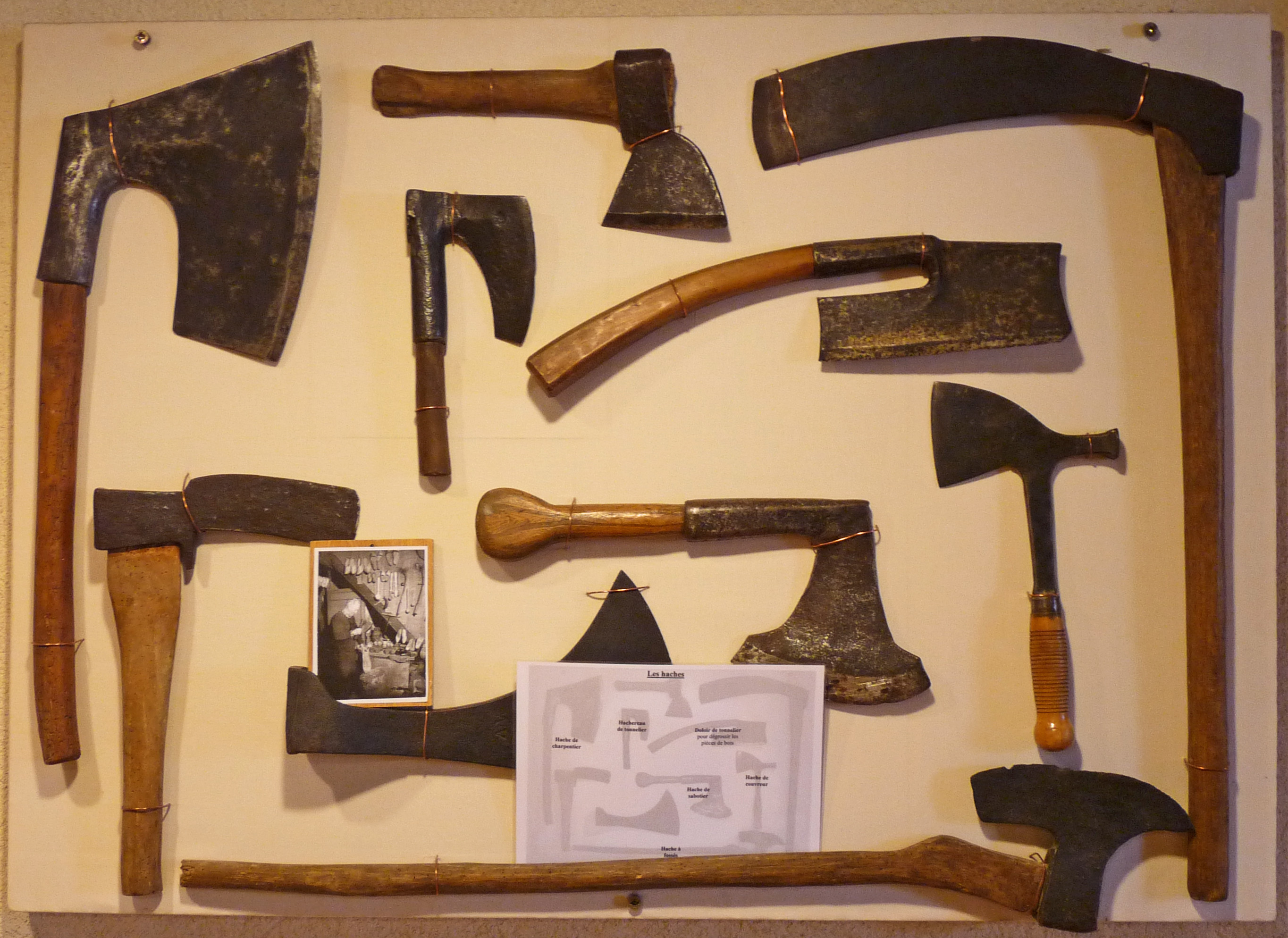
Several shapes of French axes and hatchets

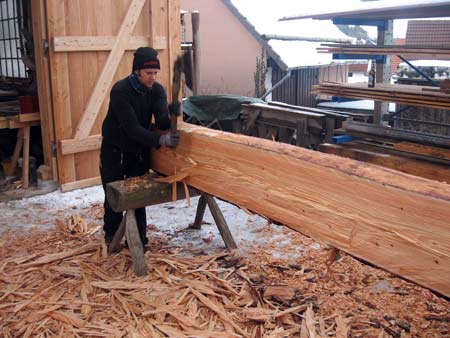
Hewing timber with a broadaxe in Germany

== See also ==
- Battle axe
