= Nemegos, Ontario =

Nemegos
- Etymology: Named for the Nemegosenda River
- Location of Nemegos in Ontario
- Coordinates: 47°43′32″N 83°12′13″W
- Country: Canada
- Province: Ontario
- Region: Northeastern Ontario
- District: Sudbury
- Part: Sudbury, Unorganized, North
- Founded: 1890s
- Elevation: 436 m (1,430 ft)
- Time zone: UTC-5 (Eastern Time Zone)
  - Summer (DST): UTC-4 (Eastern Time Zone)
- Postal code FSA: P0M
- Area codes: 705, 249

Nemegos is an unincorporated place and community in geographic Halsey Township in the Unorganized North Part of Sudbury District in Northeastern Ontario, Canada. It is on the Nemegosenda River in the James Bay drainage basin, and also is on the Canadian Pacific Railway transcontinental main line, between the railway points of Devon to the west and Tophet to the east.

== History ==
Nemegos was established in the 1890s as a sectional point on the CPR between the divisional points of Chapleau to the west and Cartier to the east. The residents were a mix of native and European settlers, primarily Finnish people. The post office was opened in 1912 by S.A. Hatch. There was a store, hotel, bunkhouses and a one-room school. Some of the men worked on the CPR; however, most were logging contractors, producing axe ties under contract to Austin, Nicholson Ltd. of nearby Chapleau.

== Transportation ==
Nemegos railway station is served by the Via Rail Sudbury – White River train.
