= Axe tie =

Hand-hewn railroad tie

Axe ties are railway ties (or sleeper) that are hewn by hand, usually with a broadaxe. There are 2,900 ties per mile of track on a first class railroad. The early railways would not accept ties cut with a saw, as it was claimed that the kerf of the saw splintered the fibres of the wood, leaving them more likely to soak up moisture causing premature rot.

== The process ==
Geoff Marples wrote an account of being a tiehack in the East Kootenays in 1938 and described the process of making axe ties to include: First a suitable tree was chosen and then felling and limbing the tree. Next came scoring which is chopping, by eye without a chalk line, of notches to remove extra wood about every 10 inches (250 mm); hewing the trunks only on two sides unless the log was over 11 inches (280 mm) in diameter; bucking (cutting to in this case 8 ft or 2.4 m); peeling any remaining bark off; and stacking the ties so a chain can be wrapped around them. Next came skidding each group of ties to a landing with a team of horses, and then loading and hauling the ties to a railway siding by truck and unloading by hand. Scaling was the key event where a railroad inspector accepted or culled (rejected) and graded each tie as a number one (7 by 9 in or 180 by 230 mm used for the main railroad lines) or number two (6 by 6 in or 150 by 150 mm used for sidings). Loading the 200-pound (91 kg) ties by hand onto a car was the last task. Marples wrote that he netted 48¢ for each grade one, and 36¢ for each grade two and made $150 for a winter's work.

== Wood species ==
Cedar was the most sought after wood for ties, since it is known for being extremely resistant to rot. However, as electric power came into more common use in the early 1900s, it was substituted by other species such as Tamarack. In northern regions where jack pine was plentiful, that species became a more common source for railway ties. Jack pine ties did not last as long as cedar or tamarack (lying on the ground), but were cheaper to produce. As creosote treatment came into use the axe ties were phased out, but jack pine remained best suited for softwood ties.

== Production in Canada ==
Axe tie production was an important early industry for many communities in Ontario along the railway such as Foleyet and Nemegos in the early 1900s.
