= Nemegos station =

Railway station in Ontario, Canada

Nemegos

General information
- Location: Nemegos, Ontario; Canada
- Coordinates: 47°43′32″N 83°12′13″W
- Owner: Via Rail

Construction
- Structure type: Sign post

History
- Former names: Canadian Pacific Railway

Services
Preceding station	Via Rail	Following station
Devon toward White River	Sudbury–White River	Kinogama toward Sudbury
Former services
Preceding station	Canadian Pacific Railway	Following station
Chapleau toward Vancouver	Main Line	Kinogama toward Montreal Windsor
Location
- Location within Ontario

Nemegos station is a Via Rail flag stop station located at Nemegos, Ontario in the Unorganized North Part of Sudbury District in Northeastern Ontario, Canada. It is on the Canadian Pacific Railway (CPR) transcontinental main line, and is served by the regional rail Sudbury – White River train.

Nemegos was established in the 1890s as a sectional point on the CPR between the divisional points of Chapleau to the west and Cartier to the east.
