= Hewing =

Method for converting a log into lumber

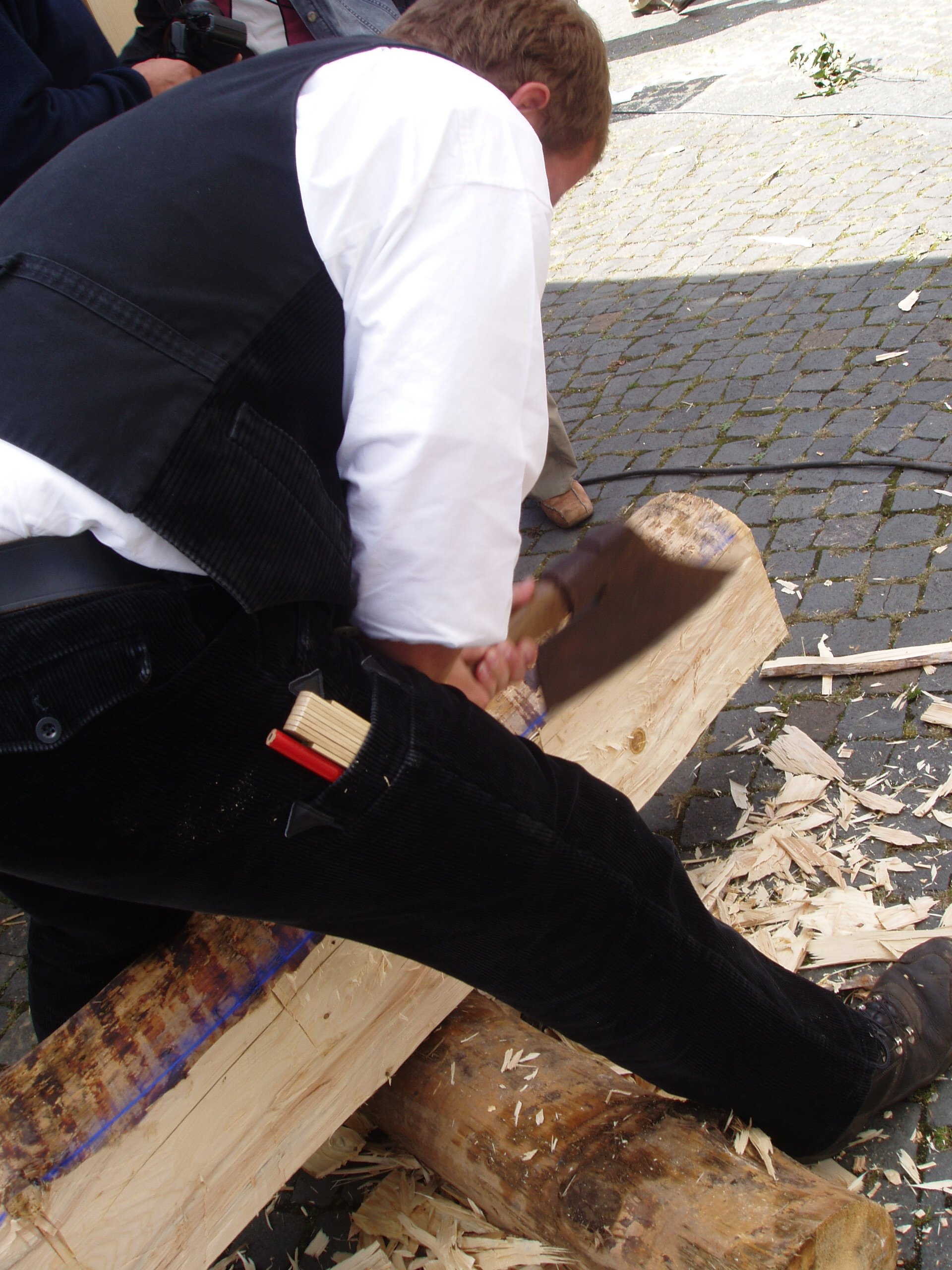
A German carpenter (Zimmermann) hewing a log into a beam. Note the blue chalk line snapped on the log to which the hewer works.

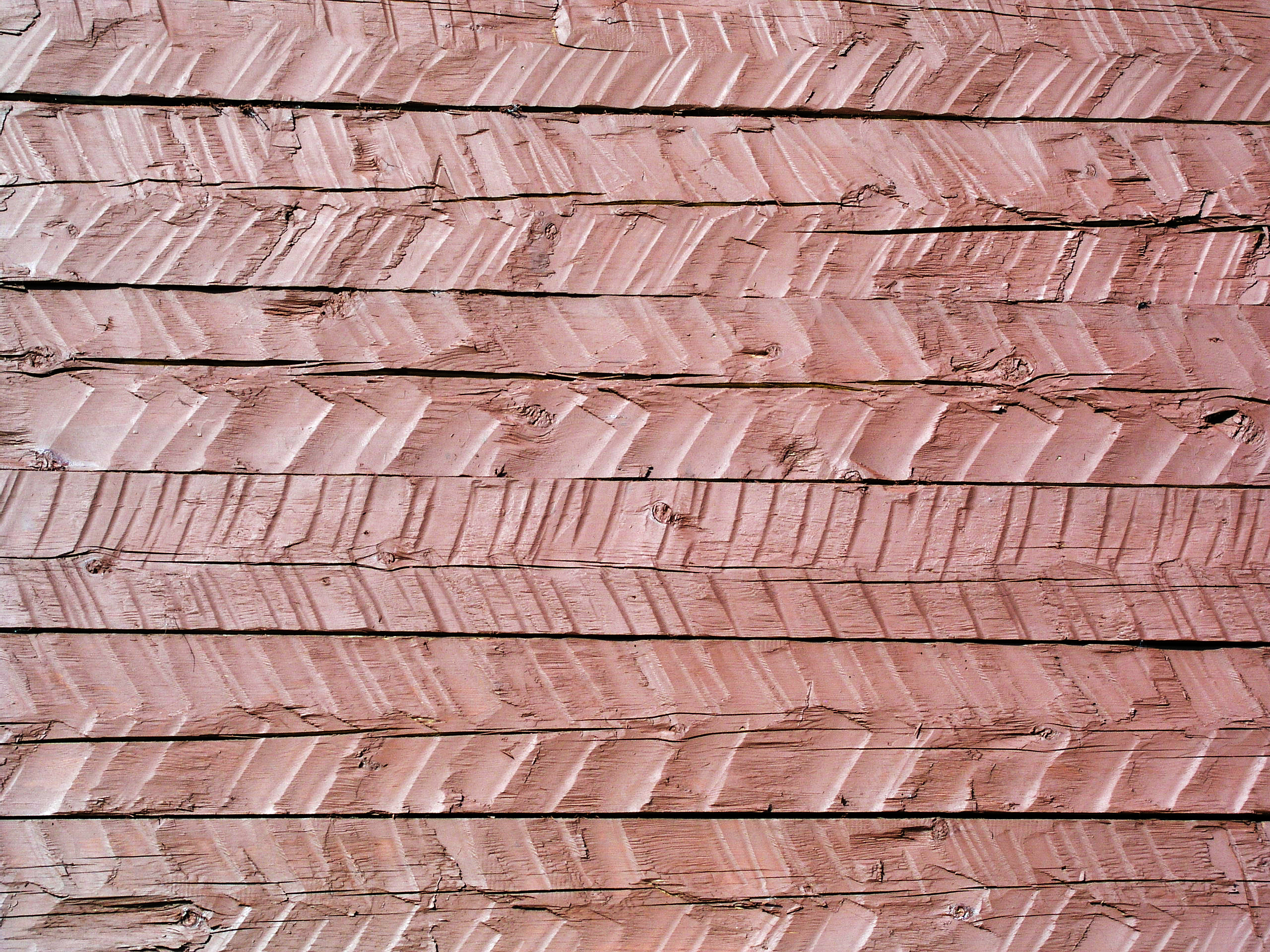
In some medieval Scandinavian buildings a special method of hewing which produces a herringbone pattern on the timbers has been used (Swedish: Slinthuggning, Norwegian: Sprettejling). This is a modern reconstruction in Stråsjö Chapel in Hälsingland, Sweden.

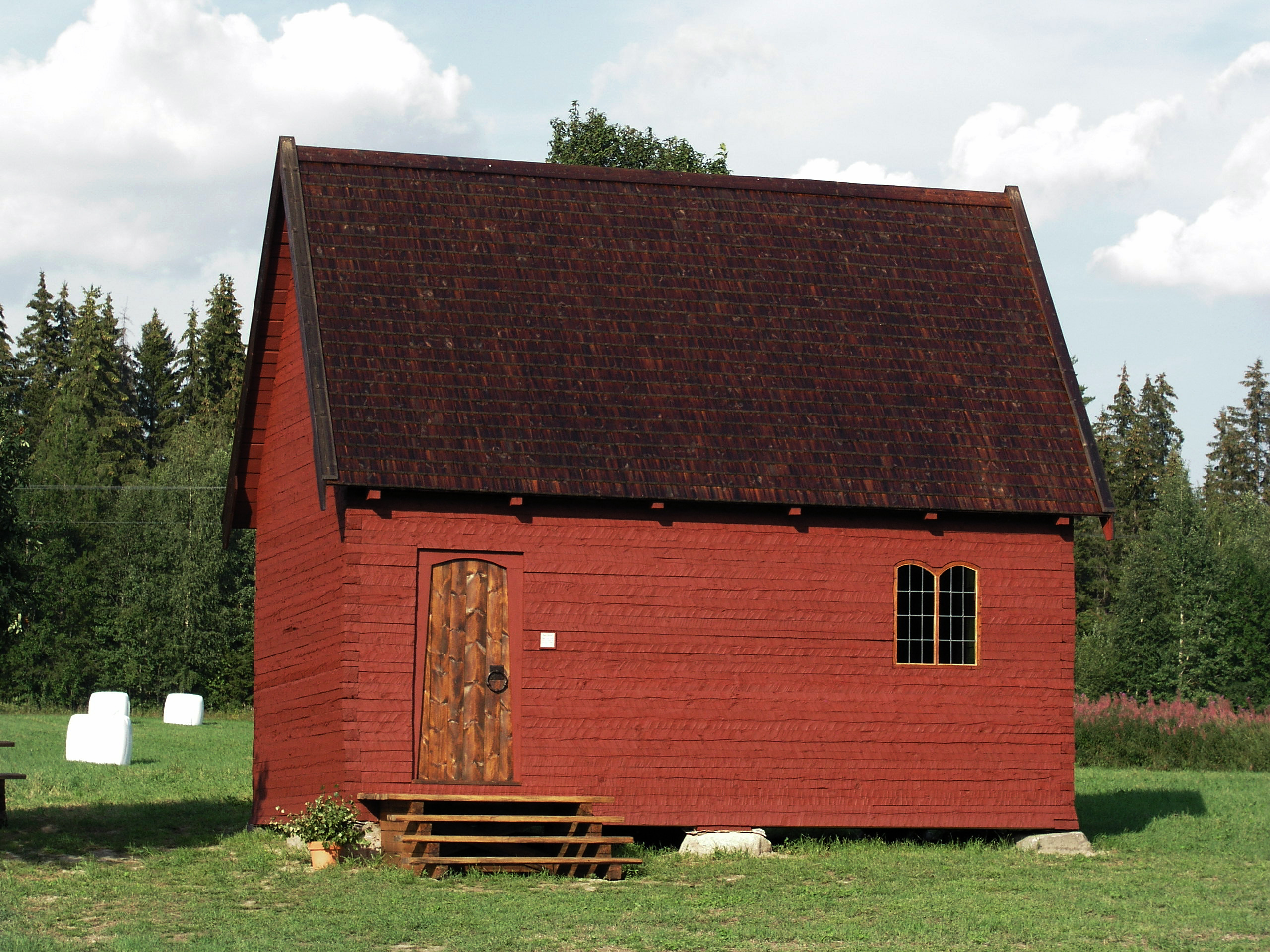
Stråsjö Chapel

In woodworking, hewing is the process of converting a log from its rounded natural form into lumber (timber) with more or less flat surfaces using primarily an axe. It is an ancient method, and before the advent of sawmills, it was a standard way of squaring up wooden beams for timber framing. Today it is still used occasionally for that purpose by anyone who has logs, needs beams, and cannot or would prefer not to pay for finished lumber. Thus, homesteaders on frugal budgets, for example, may hew their own lumber rather than buy it.

== Definitions ==
Hew is a general term meaning to strike or blow with a tool such as an axe or sword; to chop or gash, and is used in warfare, stone and woodcutting, and coal and salt mining in this sense. Hewing wood is to shape the wood with a sharp instrument such as an axe, specifically flattening one or more sides of a log.

== Methods ==
As an ancient method of timber conversion, different methods of each step in hewing have developed in history.

=== Prepare log ===
After a tree is selected and felled, hewing can take place where the log landed or be skidded or twitched (skidded with a horse or oxen) out of the woods to a work site. The log is placed across two other smaller logs near the ground or up on trestles about waist height; stabilized either by notching the support logs, or using a 'timber dog' (also called a log dog, a long bar of iron with a tooth on either end that jams into the logs and prevents movement). The hewer measures and locates the timber within the log on both ends and marks lines along the length of a log, usually with a chalk line.

=== Scoring ===
The next step is to chop notches every foot or two, almost as deep as the marked line using a chopping or scoring axe, called scoring. At least three methods are used in scoring. 1) Standing on the log and swinging an axe to chop the score; 2) In Germany a method of two carpenters standing on the ground with the log on trestles and swinging downward to slice the scores. (see video in link below); 3) A chainsaw is used to notch the log, the sections created by the notching are then split off using a felling axe.

=== Joggling or juggling ===
The pieces of wood between the notches are knocked off with an axe, this process called juggling or joggling. This results in a rough surface pared down just shy of the marked line. Scoring and juggling remove a fair amount of wood, make hewing easier and prevent long shreds of wood being torn off.

=== Hewing ===
Hewing is the last step in this whole process, which is also collectively referred to as hewing. Hewing is done on the log's sides with a broadaxe. Hewing occurs from the bottom of the stem upwards toward what was the top of the standing tree, reducing the tendency of the broken fibers to migrate inwards towards the eventual beam.

It is widely published that an adze was used to hew the top surface of a log flat in the same manner as an axe is used on the sides of a log. However, physical evidence derived from looking at the marks left by the hewing tools in historic buildings, called tracology, shows that they were swung in an arc and thus made by an axe, not an adze. Shipbuilders frequently used adzes in shaping ship timbers, the choice of tool being made by the position of the surface being hewn, with the sides best hewn with an axe and the face best hewn with an adze. However, historic illustrations do show some Asian carpenters hewing building timbers with an adze. Further smoothing can then be done using a hand plane, drawknife, yariganna (an ancient Japanese cutting tool) or any other established or improvised means.

Some 19th-century timber buildings in the U.S. have hewn long timbers in the same framing with vertically sawn and the later technology of circular sawn timbers. The reason for this is the long timbers were easier to hew with an axe than to take to a sawmill, due to poor transportation routes.

Hewn railroad ties are known as axe ties and were made by a "tiehacker".

=== Modern uses ===
Although still used in niche modern building, salvaged hand-hewn beams are now commonly recycled as architectural details popular in new construction and renovation of homes. They are also popular as decor in commercial and restaurant spaces.
