= Truss connector plate =

Light gauge metal plate used to connect prefabricated light frame wood trusses

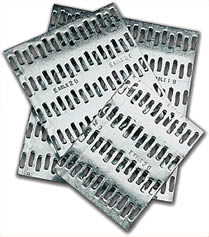
Metal connector plates

A truss connector plate, or gang plate, is a kind of tie. Truss plates are light gauge metal plates used to connect prefabricated light frame wood trusses. They are produced by punching light gauge galvanized steel to create teeth on one side. The teeth are embedded in and hold the wooden frame components to the plate and each other.

Nail plates are used to connect timber of the same thickness in the same plane. When used on trusses, they are pressed into the side of the timber using tools such as a hydraulic press or a roller. As the plate is pressed in, the teeth are all driven into the wood fibers simultaneously, and the compression between adjacent teeth reduces the tendency of the wood to split.

A truss connector plate is manufactured from ASTM A653/A653M, A591, A792/A792M, or A167 structural quality steel and is protected with zinc or zinc-aluminum alloy coatings or their stainless steel equivalent. Metal connector plates are manufactured with varying length, width and thickness (or gauge) and are designed to laterally transmit loads in wood. They are also known as stud ties, metal connector plates, mending plates, or nail plates. However, not all types of nail plates are approved for use in trusses and other structurally critical placements.

== History ==
John Calvin Jureit invented the truss connector plate and patented it in 1955. He formed the company Gang-Nails, Inc. which was later renamed Automated Building Components, Inc.
