= Crowbar =

Hand tool for prying boards and nails

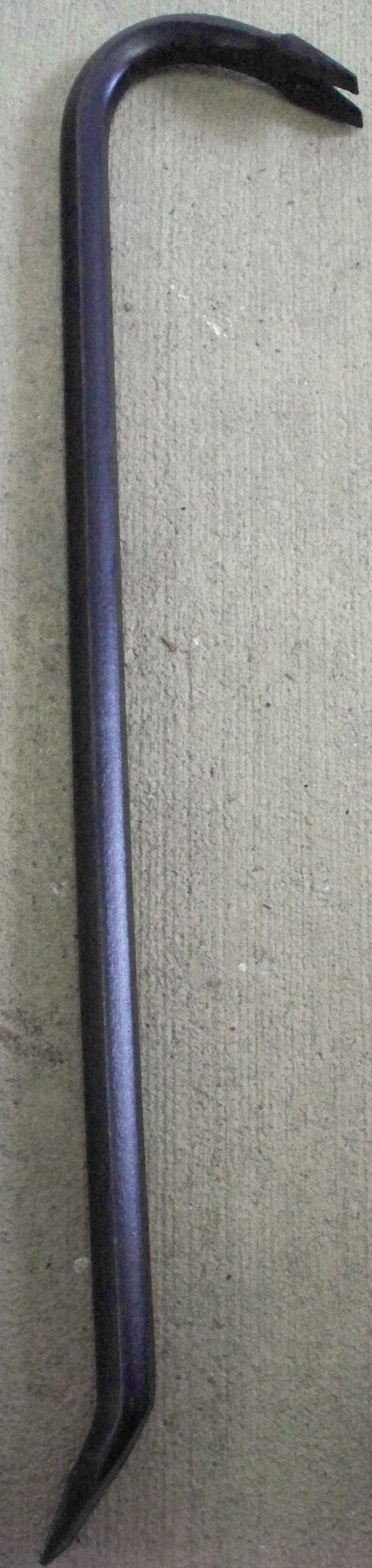
A crowbar with a curved chisel end to provide a fulcrum for leverage and a goose neck to pull nails

A crowbar (Note: Also called a wrecking bar, pry bar or prybar, pinch-bar, or occasionally a prise bar or prisebar, colloquially gooseneck, or pig bar, or in Australia a jemmy.) is a lever consisting of a metal bar with a single curved end and flattened points, used to force two objects apart or gain mechanical advantage in lifting; often the curved end has a notch for removing nails. Crowbars have a variety of uses, with specific types of crowbar being more suited to certain tasks.

The design can be used as any of the three lever classes. The curved end is usually used as a first-class lever, and the flat end as a second-class lever.

Designs made from thick flat steel bar are often referred to as utility bars.

Crowbars are occasionally used by criminals as a tool for forcible entry or as an offensive weapon. The use of a crowbar as a weapon is also common in fictional media, and it is considered an iconic part of the Half-Life franchise.

== Materials and construction ==
A common hand tool, the crowbar is typically made of medium-carbon steel, possibly hardened on its ends.

Commonly crowbars are forged from long steel stock, either hexagonal or sometimes cylindrical. Alternative designs may be forged with a rounded I-shaped cross-section shaft. Versions using relatively wide flat steel bar are often referred to as "utility" or "flat bars".

== Etymology and usage ==
The accepted etymology identifies the first component of the word crowbar with the bird-name "crow", perhaps due to the crowbar's resemblance to the feet or beak of a crow. The first use of the term is dated back to c. 1400. It was also called simply a crow, or iron crow; William Shakespeare used the latter, as in Romeo and Juliet, Act 5, Scene 2: "Get me an iron crow and bring it straight unto my cell."

In Daniel Defoe's 1719 novel Robinson Crusoe, the protagonist lacks a pickaxe so uses a crowbar instead: "As for the pickaxe, I made use of the iron crows, which were proper enough, though heavy."

== Types ==
Types of crowbar include:

- Alignment pry bar, also referred to as Sleeve bar
- Cat’s claw pry bar, more simply known as a cat's paw
- Digging pry bar
- Flat pry bar
- Gooseneck pry bar
- Heavy-duty pry bar
- Molding pry bar
- Rolling head pry bar

== See also ==
- Halligan bar
- Fencing bar
- Tire iron
