= Nail (fastener) =

Sharp object of hard metal used as a fastener

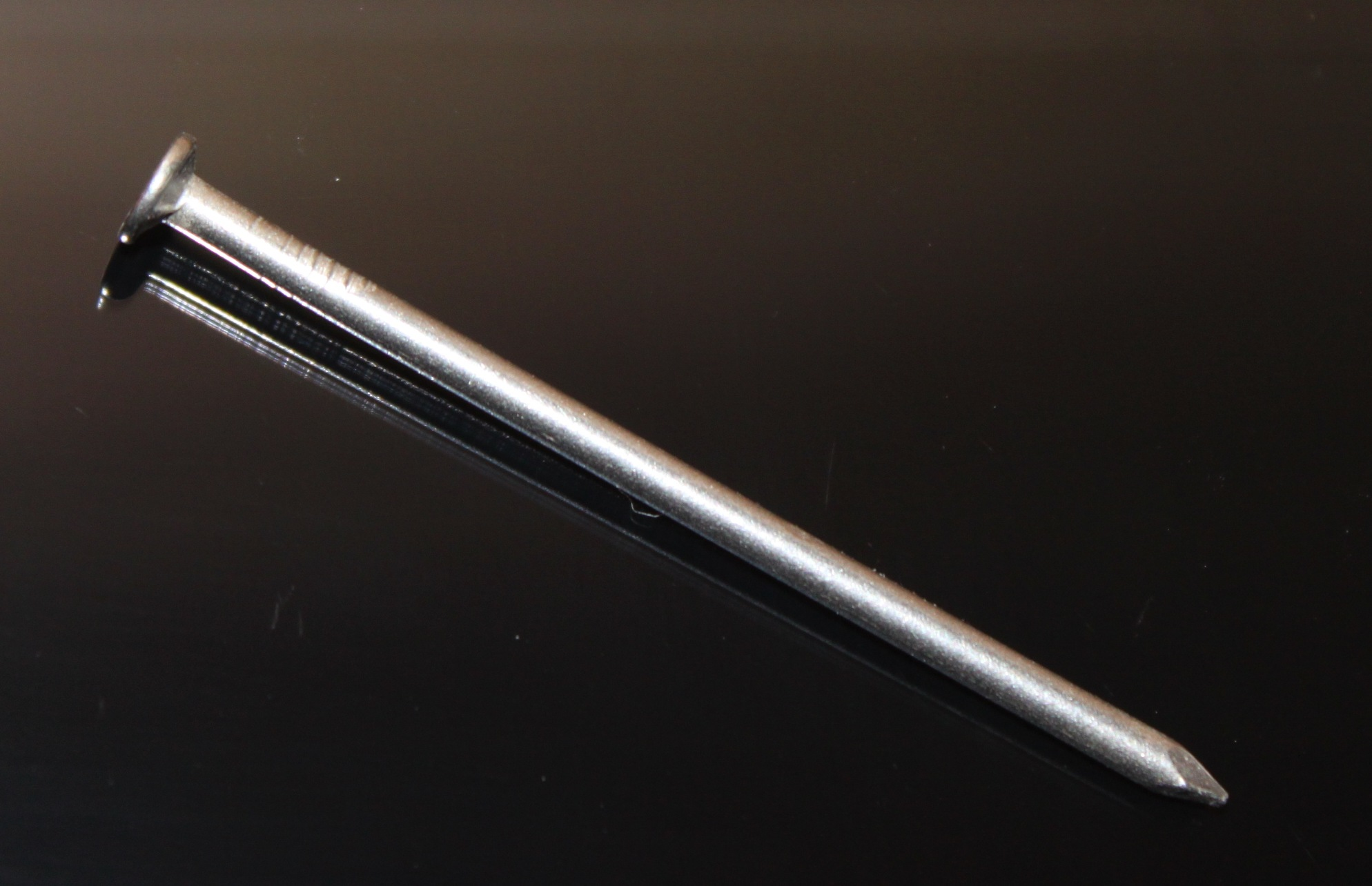
- A metal nail
- Classification: Fastener
- Used with: Wood, concrete, metal

In woodworking and construction, a nail is a small object made of metal (or wood, called a tree nail or "trunnel") which is used as a fastener, as a peg to hang something, or sometimes as a decoration. Usually, nails have a sharp point on one end and a flattened head on the other, but headless nails are available. Nails are made in a great variety of forms for specialized purposes. The most common is a wire nail. Other types of nails include pins, tacks, brads, spikes, and cleats.

Nails are typically driven into the workpiece by a hammer or nail gun. A nail holds materials together by friction in the axial direction and shear strength laterally. The point of the nail is also sometimes bent over or clinched after driving to prevent pulling out.

== History ==
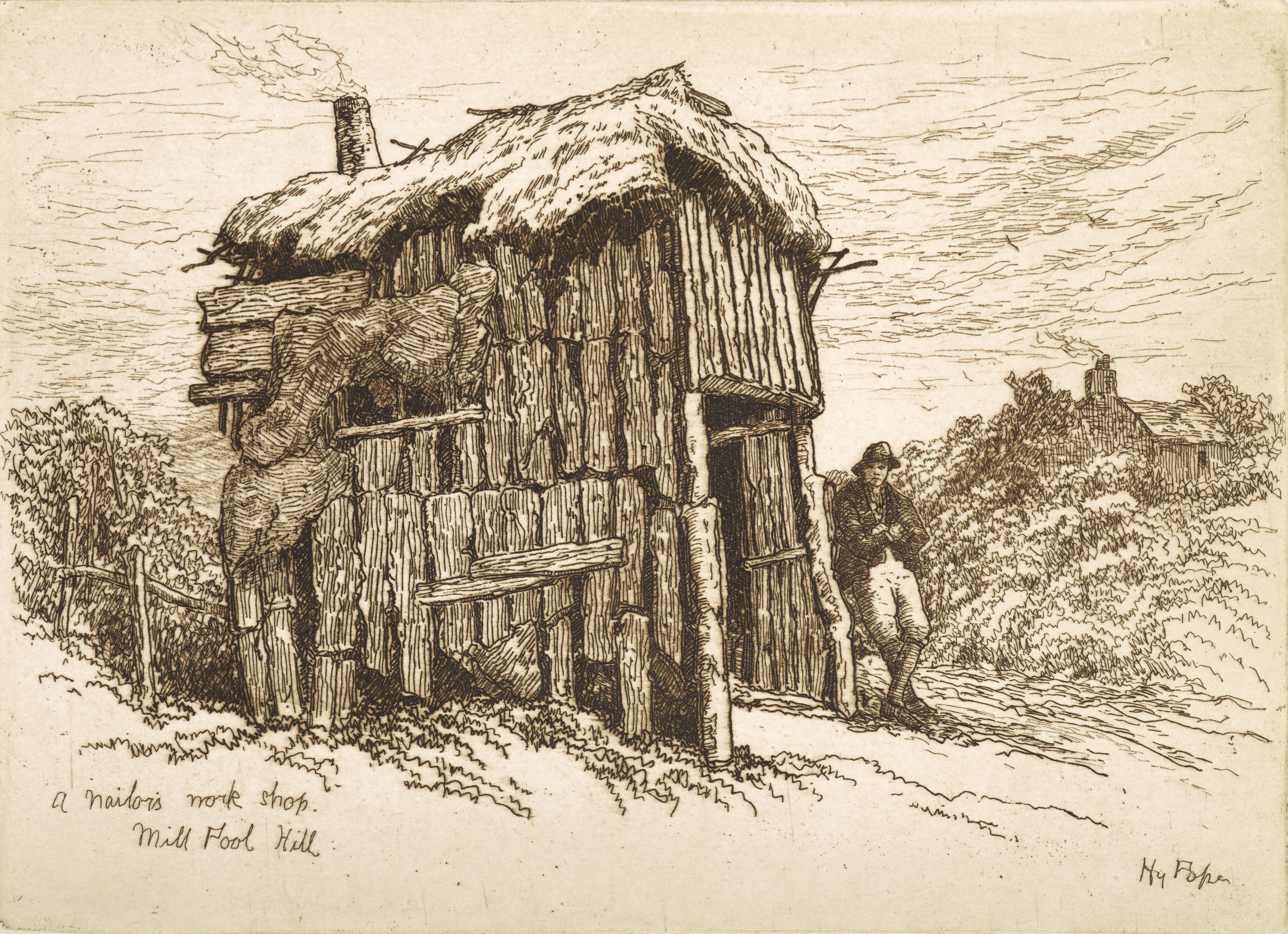
Nailor's Workshop King's Norton, an etching by Henry Martin Pope (1843–1908)

The history of the nail is divided roughly into three distinct periods:

- Hand-wrought (forged) nail (pre-history until 19th century)
- Cut nail (roughly 1800 to 1914)
- Wire nail (roughly 1860 to the present)

From the late 1700s to the mid-1900s, nail prices fell by a factor of 10; since then nail prices have increased slightly, reflecting in part an upturn in materials prices and a shift toward specialty nails.

=== Hand wrought ===
Hand-forging a nail, including use of a nail-header

Partly mechanised boat nail production in Hainan, China

In hand-working of nails, a smith works an approximately conical iron pin tapering to a point. This is then inserted into a nail-header (also known as a nail-plate), essentially a plate of iron with a small hole in it. The broad end of the pin is slightly wider than the hole of the nail-header: the smith fits the pin into the hole of the nail-header and then hammers the broad end of the pin. Unable to advance through the hole, the broad end is flattened against the nail-header to create a nail-head. In at least some metalworking traditions, nail-headers might have been identical to draw-plates (a plate bored with tapering holes of different sizes through which wire can be drawn to extrude it to increasingly fine proportions).

The Bible provides a number of references to nails, including the story in Judges of Jael the wife of Heber, who drives a nail (or tent-peg) into the temple of a sleeping Canaanite commander; the provision of iron for nails by King David for what would become Solomon's Temple; and in connection with the crucifixion of Jesus Christ.

The Romans made extensive use of nails. The Roman army, for example, left behind seven tons of nails when it evacuated the fortress of Inchtuthil in Perthshire in Scotland in 86 to 87 CE.

The term "penny", as it refers to nails, probably originated in medieval England to describe the price of a hundred nails. Nails themselves were sufficiently valuable and standardized to be used as an impromptu medium of exchange; trading between James Cook's entourage and Tahitians in the later half of the 18th century being a notable example with the absence of metals in Polynesia's volcanic islands until knowledge of the malleable iron came spread following the breaking apart of Jacob Roggeveen's abandoned Afrikaansche Galey wreck by Takapoto islanders in 1722.

Until around 1800 artisans known as nailers or nailors made nails by hand – note the surname Naylor. (Workmen called slitters cut up iron bars to a suitable size for nailers to work on. From the late 16th century, manual slitters disappeared with the rise of the slitting mill, which cut bars of iron into rods with an even cross-section, saving much manual effort.)

At the time of the American Revolution, England was the largest manufacturer of nails in the world. Nails were expensive and difficult to obtain in the American colonies, so that abandoned houses were sometimes deliberately burned down to allow recovery of used nails from the ashes. This became such a problem in Virginia that a law was created to stop people from burning their houses when they moved. Families often had small nail-manufacturing setups in their homes; during bad weather and at night, the entire family might work at making nails for their own use and for barter. Thomas Jefferson wrote in a letter: "In our private pursuits it is a great advantage that every honest employment is deemed honorable. I am myself a nail maker." The growth of the trade in the American colonies was theoretically held back by the prohibition of new slitting mills in America by the Iron Act, though there is no evidence that the Act was actually enforced.

The production of wrought-iron nails continued well into the 19th century, but ultimately was reduced to nails for purposes for which the softer cut nails were unsuitable, including horseshoe nails.

=== Cut ===
The slitting mill, introduced to England in 1590, simplified the production of nail rods, but the real first efforts to mechanise the nail-making process itself occurred between 1790 and 1820, initially in England and the United States, when various machines were invented to automate and speed up the process of making nails from bars of wrought iron. Also in Sweden in the early 1700s Christopher Polhem produced a nail cutting machine as part of his automated factory. These nails were known as cut nails because they were produced by cutting iron bars into rods; they were also known as square nails because of their roughly rectangular cross section.

The cut-nail process was patented in the U.S. by Jacob Perkins in 1795 and in England by Joseph Dyer, who set up machinery in Birmingham. The process was designed to cut nails from sheets of iron, while making sure that the fibres of the iron ran down the nails. The Birmingham industry expanded in the following decades, and reached its greatest extent in the 1860s, after which it declined due to competition from wire nails, but continued until the outbreak of World War I.

Cut nails were one of the important factors in the increase in balloon framing beginning in the 1830s and thus the decline of timber framing with wooden joints. Though still used for historical renovations, and for heavy-duty applications, such as attaching boards to masonry walls, cut nails are much less common today than wire nails.

During the time when the settlers were annexing Texas, the Salish were in the Pacific Northwest using the nail. The nail they used was made of wood, cedar, and copper. They made the wooden ones using a form of carving. The copper nails were made from melting copper and shaping it into a nail form.

=== Wire ===
Wire nails are formed from wire. Usually coils of wire are drawn through a series of dies to reach a specific diameter, then cut into short rods that are then formed into nails. The nail tip is usually cut by a blade; the head is formed by reshaping the other end of the rod under high pressure. Other dies are used to cut grooves and ridges. Wire nails were also known as "French nails" for their country of origin. Belgian wire nails began to compete in England in 1863. Joseph Henry Nettlefold was making wire nails at Smethwick by 1875. Over the following decades, the nail-making process was almost completely automated. Eventually the industry had machines capable of quickly producing huge numbers of inexpensive nails with little or no human intervention.

With the introduction of cheap wire nails, the use of wrought iron for nail making quickly declined, as more slowly did the production of cut nails. In the United States, in 1892 more steel-wire nails were produced than cut nails. In 1913, 90% of manufactured nails were wire nails. Nails went from being rare and precious to being a cheap mass-produced commodity. Today almost all nails are manufactured from wire, but the term "wire nail" has come to refer to smaller nails, often available in a wider, more precise range of gauges than is typical for larger common and finish nails. Today, many nails are made using the modern rotary principle nail machine, which allows wire feeding, wire cutting and nail head forming to take place in one continuous process of rotating movements.

== Materials ==
Nails were formerly made of bronze or wrought iron and were crafted by blacksmiths and nailors. These crafts people used a heated square iron rod that they forged before they hammered the sides which formed a point. After reheating and cutting off, the blacksmith or nailor inserted the hot nail into an opening and hammered it. Later new ways of making nails were created using machines to shear the nails before wiggling the bar sideways to produce a shank. For example, the Type A cut nails were sheared from an iron bar type guillotine using early machinery. This method was slightly altered until the 1820s when new heads on the nails' ends were pounded via a separate mechanical nail heading machine. In the 1810s, iron bars were flipped over after each stroke while the cutter set was at an angle. Every nail was then sheared off of taper allowing for an automatic grip of each nail which also formed their heads. Type B nails were created this way. In 1886, 10 percent of the nails that were made in the United States were of the soft steel wire variety and by 1892, steel wire nails overtook iron cut nails as the main type of nails that were being produced. In 1913, wire nails were 90 percent of all nails that were produced.

Today's nails are typically made of steel, often dipped or coated to prevent corrosion in harsh conditions or to improve adhesion. Ordinary nails for wood are usually of a soft, low-carbon or "mild" steel (about 0.1% carbon, the rest iron and perhaps a trace of silicon or manganese). Nails for masonry applications are tempered and have a higher carbon content.

== Types ==
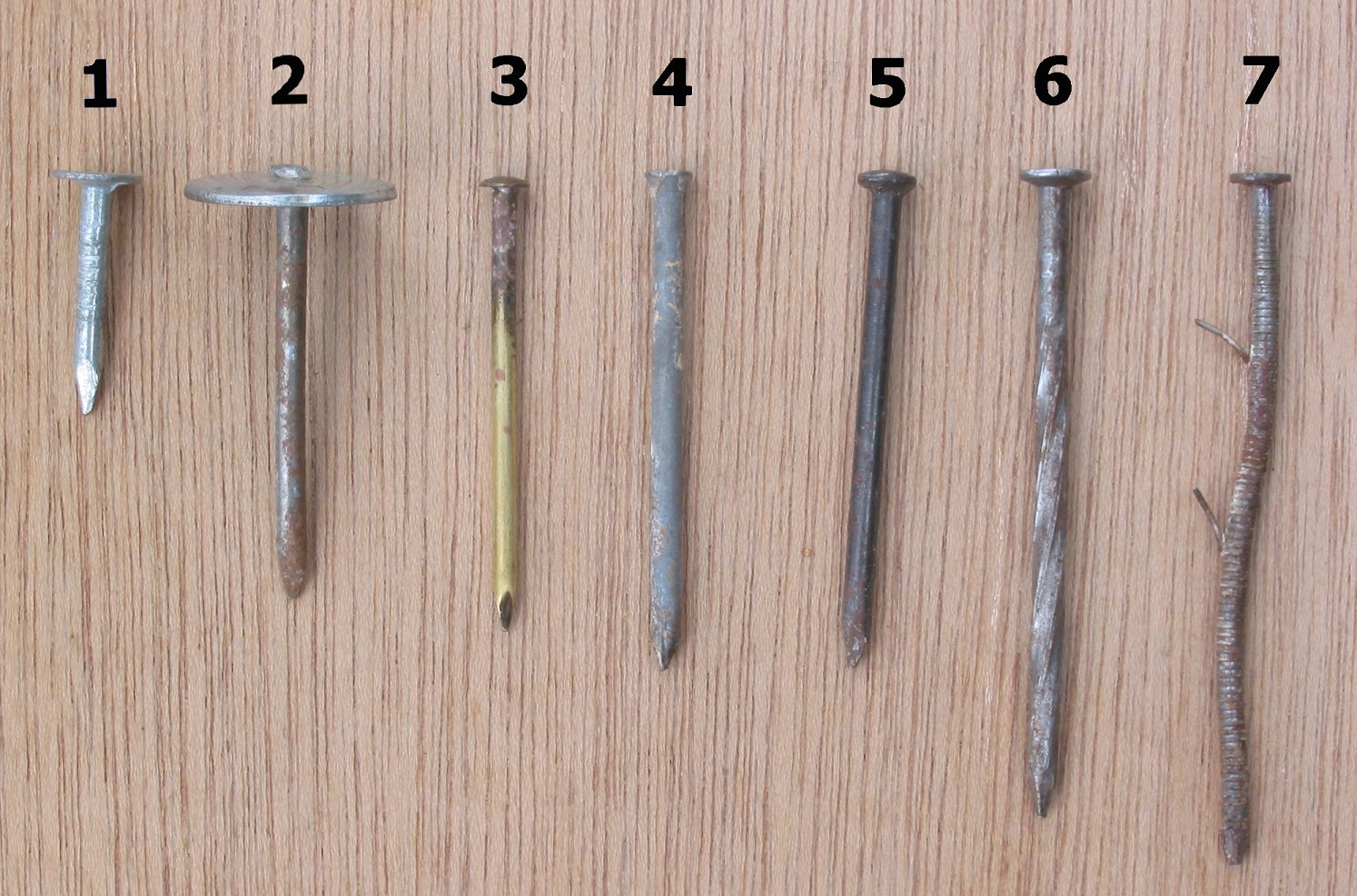
Different types of nails: 1) roofing 2) umbrella head roofing 3) brass escutcheon pin 4) finish 5) concrete 6) spiral-shank 7) ring-shank (a used, bent "gun" nail, with barbs left over from the tool's feed system)

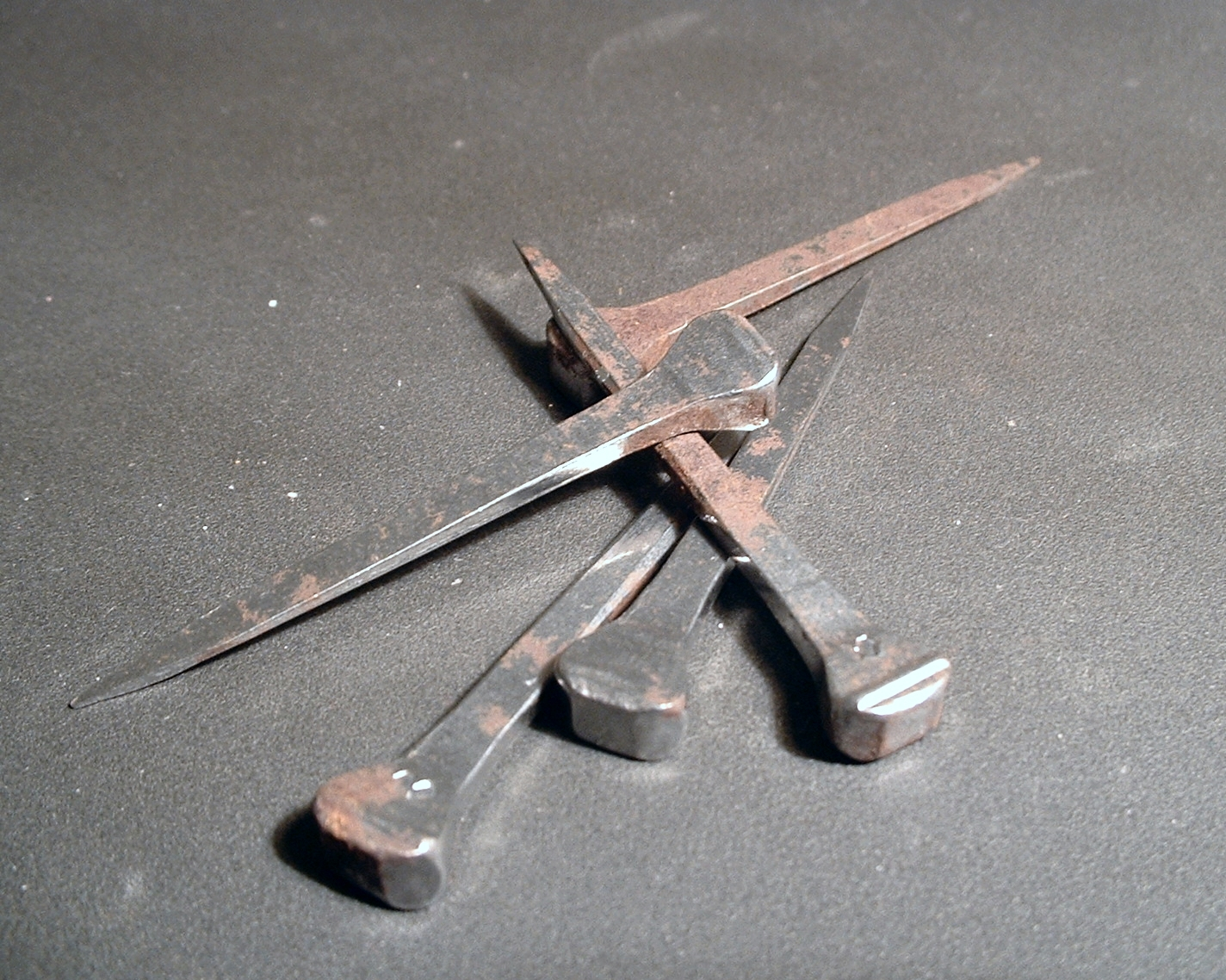
Horseshoe nails

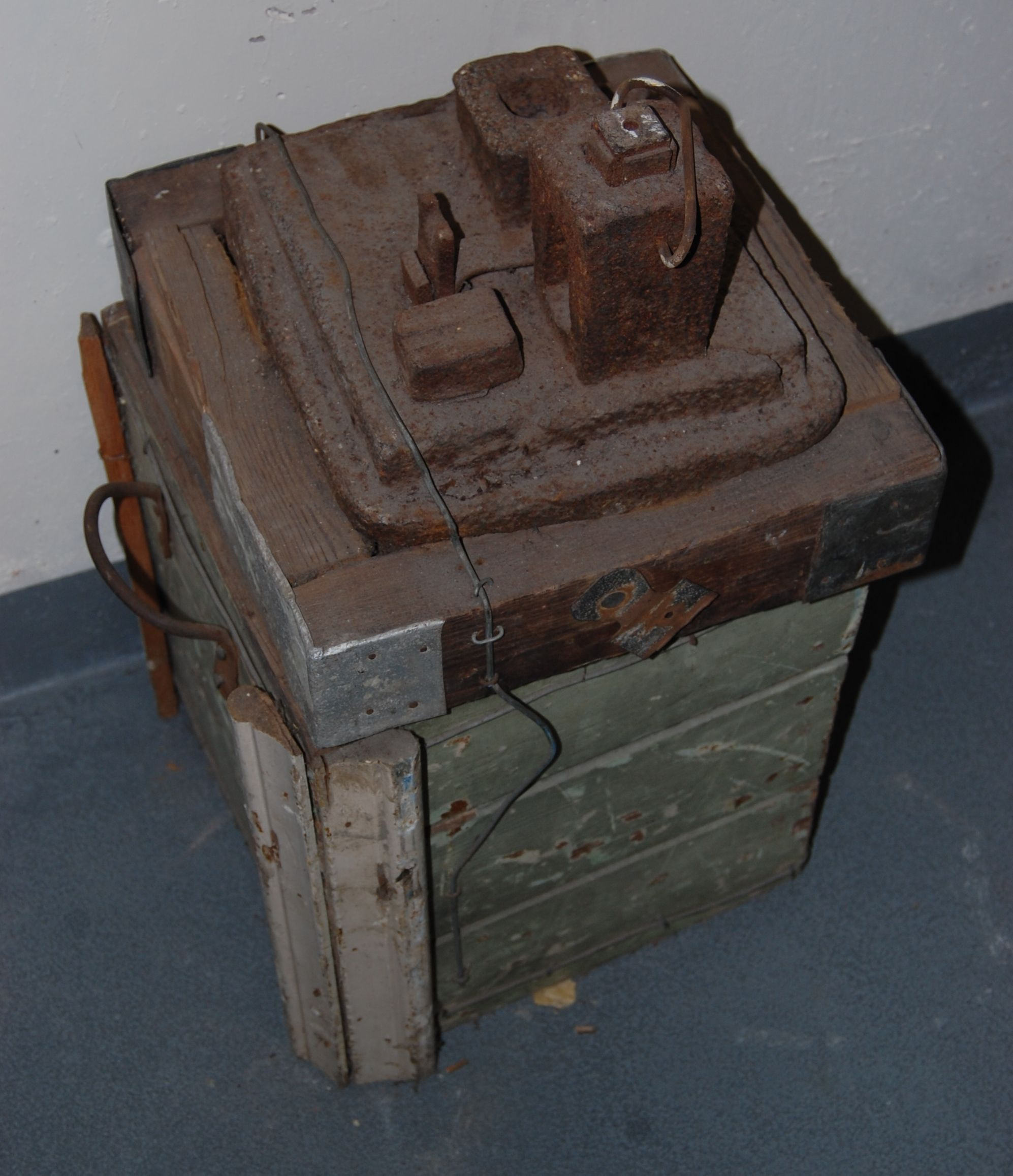
Nail-maker's work-bench or anvil in a storeroom of the Black Country Living Museum

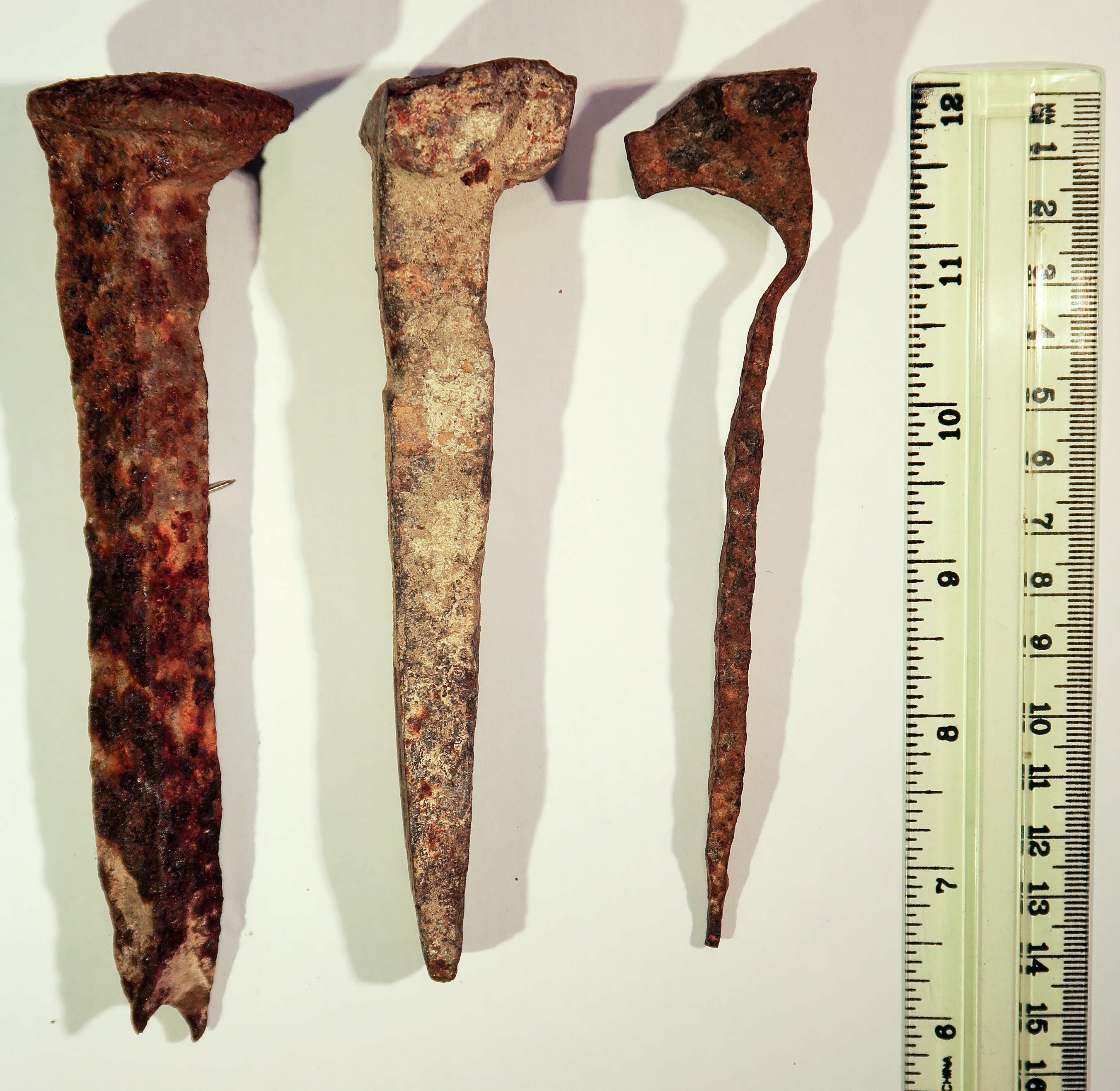
Railroad spikes of the old Jezreel Valley railway (part of the Hejaz Railway), found near Kfar Baruch (Israel)

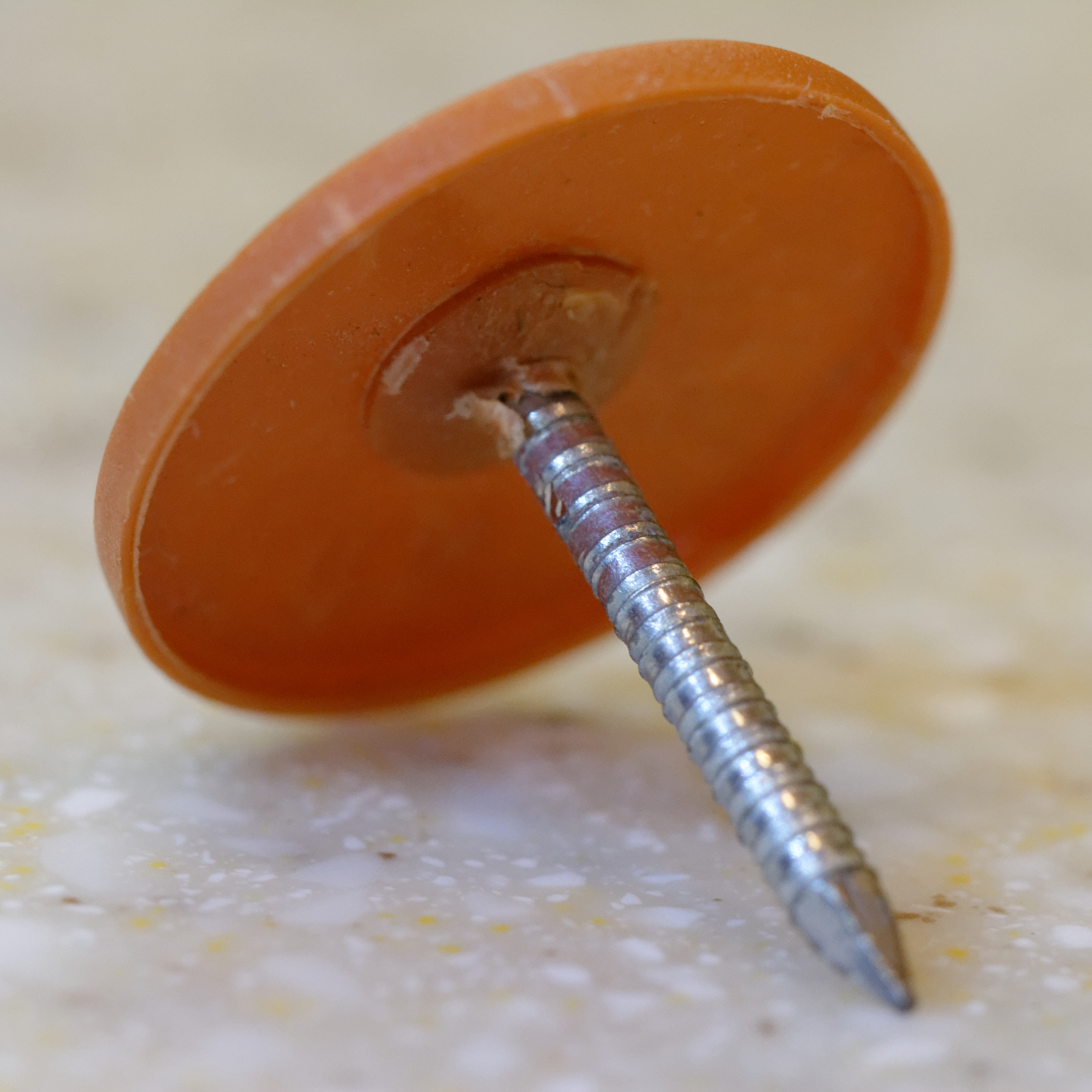
A capped nail for weather wrap

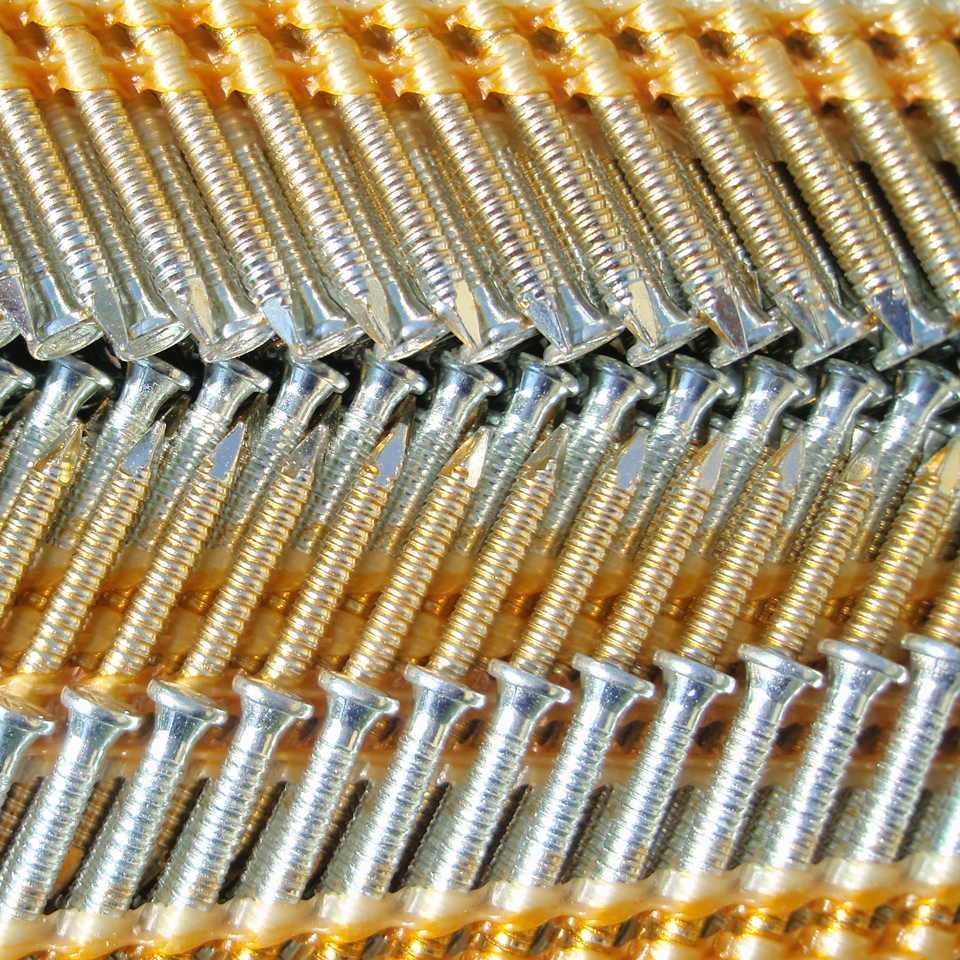
Nails for nail guns

Types of nail include:

- Aluminium nails – Made of aluminium in many shapes and sizes for use with aluminium architectural metals
- Box nail – like a common nail but with a thinner shank and head
- Brads are small, thin, tapered nails with a lip or projection to one side rather than a full head or a small finish nail
  - Floor brad ('stigs') – flat, tapered and angular, for use in fixing floor boards
  - Oval brad – Ovals utilize the principles of fracture mechanics to allow nailing without splitting. Highly anisotropic materials like regular wood (as opposed to wood composites) can easily be wedged apart. Use of an oval perpendicular to the wood's grain cuts the wood fibers rather than wedges them apart, and thus allows fastening without splitting, even close to edges
  - Panel pins
- Tacks or Tintacks are short, sharp pointed nails often used with carpet, fabric and paper. Normally cut from sheet steel (as opposed to wire), the tack is used in upholstery, shoe making and saddle manufacture. The triangular shape of the nail's cross section gives greater grip and less tearing of materials such as cloth and leather compared to a wire nail.
  - Brass tack – brass tacks are commonly used where corrosion may be an issue, such as furniture where contact with human skin salts will cause corrosion on steel nails
  - Canoe tack – A clinching (or clenching) nail. The nail point is tapered so that it can be turned back on itself using a clinching iron. It then bites back into the wood from the side opposite the nail's head, forming a rivet-like fastening.
  - Clench-nails used in building clinker boats.
  - Shoe tack – A clinching nail (see above) for clinching leather and sometimes wood, formerly used for handmade shoes.
  - Carpet tack
  - Upholstery tacks – used to attach coverings to furniture
  - Thumbtack (or "push-pin" or "drawing-pin") are lightweight pins used to secure paper or cardboard.
- Casing nails – have a head that is smoothly tapered, in comparison to the "stepped" head of a finish nail. When used to install casing around windows or doors, they allow the wood to be pried off later with minimal damage when repairs are needed, and without the need to dent the face of the casing in order to grab and extract the nail. Once the casing has been removed, the nails can be extracted from the inner frame with any of the usual nail pullers
- Clout nail – a roofing nail
- Coil nail – nails designed for use in a pneumatic nail gun assembled in coils
- Common nail – smooth shank, wire nail with a heavy, flat head. The typical nail for framing
- Convex head (nipple head, springhead) roofing nail – an umbrella shaped head with a rubber gasket for fastening metal roofing, usually with a ring shank
- Copper nail – nails made of copper for use with copper flashing or slate shingles etc.
- D-head (clipped head) nail – a common or box nail with part of the head removed for some pneumatic nail guns
- Double-ended nail – a rare type of nail with points on both ends and the "head" in the middle for joining boards together. See this patent. Similar to a dowel nail but with a head on the shank.
- Double-headed (duplex, formwork, shutter, scaffold) nail – used for temporary nailing; nails can easily pulled for later disassembly
- Dowel nail – a double pointed nail without a "head" on the shank, a piece of round steel sharpened on both ends
- Drywall (plasterboard) nail – short, hardened, ring-shank nail with a very thin head
- Fiber cement nail – a nail for installing fiber cement siding
- Finish nail (bullet head nail, lost-head nail) – A wire nail with a small head intended to be minimally visible or driven below the wood surface and the hole filled to be invisible
- Gang nail – a nail plate
- Hardboard pin – a small nail for fixing hardboard or thin plywood, often with a square shank
- Horseshoe nail – nails used to hold horseshoes on hoofs
- Joist hanger nail – special nails rated for use with joist hangers and similar brackets. Sometimes called "Teco nails" (1 1/2 × .148 shank nails used in metal connectors such as hurricane ties)
- Lost-head nail – see finish nail
- Masonry (concrete) – lengthwise fluted, hardened nail for use in concrete
- Oval wire nail – nails with an oval shank
- Panel pin
- Gutter spike – Large long nail intended to hold wooden gutters and some metal gutters in place at the bottom edge of a roof
- Ring (annular, improved, jagged) shank nail – nails that have ridges circling the shank to provide extra resistance to pulling out
- Roofing (clout) nail – generally a short nail with a broad head used with asphalt shingles, felt paper or the like
- Screw (helical) nail – a nail with a spiral shank - uses including flooring and assembling pallets
- Shake (shingle) nail – small headed nails to use for nailing shakes and shingles
- Sprig – a small nail with either a headless, tapered shank or a square shank with a head on one side. Commonly used by glaziers to fix a glass plane into a wooden frame.
- Square nail – a cut nail
- T-head nail – shaped like the letter T
- Veneer pin
- Wire (French) nail – a general term for a nail with a round shank. These are sometimes called French nails from their country of invention
- Wire-weld collated nail – nails held together with slender wires for use in nail guns

== Sizes ==
Most countries, except the United States, use a metric system for describing nail sizes. A 50 × 3.0 indicates a nail 50 mm long (not including the head) and 3 mm in diameter. Lengths are rounded to the nearest millimetre.

For example, finishing nail* sizes typically available from German suppliers are:

Length, mm	Diameter, mm
20	1.2
25	1.4
30	1.6
35	1.6
35	1.8
40	2.0
45	2.2
50	2.2
55	2.2
55	2.5
60	2.5
60	2.8
65	2.8
65	3.1
70	3.1
80	3.1
80	3.4
90	3.4
90	3.8
100	3.8
100	4.2
110	4.2
120	4.2
130	4.6
140	5.5
160	5.5
180	6.0
210	7.0

- Drahtstift mit Senkkopf (Stahl, DIN 1151)

=== United States penny sizes ===
In the United States, the length of a nail is designated by its penny size.

penny size	length, inches	length, mm (nearest)
2d	1	25
3d	1 1/4	33
4d	1 1/2	38
5d	1 3/4	44
6d	2	51
7d	2 1/4	57
8d	2 1/2	64
9d	2 3/4	70
10d	3	76
12d	3 1/4	83
16d	3 1/2	89
20d	4	102
30d	4 1/2	114
40d	5	127
50d	5 1/2	140
60d	6	152

== Terminology ==
- Box: a wire nail with a head; box nails have a smaller shank than common nails of the same size
- Bright: no surface coating; not recommended for weather exposure or acidic or treated lumber
- Casing: a wire nail with a slightly larger head than finish nails; often used for flooring
- CC or Coated: "cement coated"; nail coated with adhesive, also known as cement or glue, for greater holding power; also resin- or vinyl-coated; coating melts from friction when driven to help lubricate then adheres when cool; color varies by manufacturer (tan, pink, are common)
- Common: a common construction wire nail with a disk-shaped head that is typically 3 to 4 times the diameter of the shank: common nails have larger shanks than box nails of the same size
- Cut: machine-made square nails. Now used for masonry and historical reproduction or restoration
- Duplex: a common nail with a second head, allowing for easy extraction; often used for temporary work, such as concrete forms or wood scaffolding; sometimes called a "scaffold nail"
- Drywall: a specialty blued-steel nail with a thin broad head used to fasten gypsum wallboard to wooden framing members
- Finish: a wire nail that has a head only slightly larger than the shank; can be easily concealed by countersinking the nail slightly below the finished surface with a nail-set and filling the resulting void with a filler (putty, spackle, caulk, etc.)
- Forged: handmade nails (usually square), hot-forged by a blacksmith or nailor, often used in historical reproduction or restoration, commonly sold as collector's items
- Galvanized: treated for resistance to corrosion and/or weather exposure
  - Electrogalvanized: provides a smooth finish with some corrosion resistance
  - Hot-dip galvanized: provides a rough finish that deposits more zinc than other methods, resulting in very high corrosion resistance that is suitable for some acidic and treated lumber;
  - Mechanically galvanized: deposits more zinc than electrogalvanizing for increased corrosion resistance
- Head: round flat metal piece formed at the top of the nail; for increased holding power
- Helix: the nail has a square shank that has been twisted, making it very difficult to pull out; often used in decking so they are usually galvanized; sometimes called decking nails
- Length: distance from the bottom of the head to the point of a nail
- Phosphate-coated: a dark grey to black finish providing a surface that binds well with paint and joint compound and minimal corrosion resistance
- Point: sharpened end opposite the "head" for greater ease in driving
- Pole barn: long shank (2 1/2 in to 8 in, 6 cm to 20 cm), ring shank (see below), hardened nails; usually oil quenched or galvanized (see above); commonly used in the construction of wood framed, metal buildings (pole barns)
- Ring shank: small directional rings on the shank to prevent the nail from working back out once driven in; common in drywall, flooring, and pole barn nails
- Shank: the body the length of the nail between the head and the point; may be smooth, or may have rings or spirals for greater holding power
- Sinker: these are the most common nails used in framing today; same thin diameter as a box nail; cement coated (see above); the bottom of the head is tapered like a wedge or funnel and the top of the head is grid embossed to keep the hammer strike from sliding off
- Spike: a large nail; usually over 4 in (100 mm) long
- Spiral: a twisted wire nail; spiral nails have smaller shanks than common nails of the same size

== In art and religion ==
Nails have been used in art, such as the Nail Men—a form of fundraising common in Germany and Austria during World War I.

Before the 1850s bocce and pétanque boules were wooden balls, sometimes partially reinforced with hand-forged nails. When cheap, plentiful machine-made nails became available, manufacturers began to produce the boule cloutée—a wooden core studded with nails to create an all-metal surface. Nails of different metals and colors (steel, brass, and copper) were used to create a wide variety of designs and patterns. Some of the old boules cloutées are genuine works of art and valued collector's items.

Once nails became cheap and widely available, they were often used in folk art and outsider art as a method of decorating a surface with metallic studs. Another common artistic use is the construction of sculpture from welded or brazed nails.

Nails were sometimes inscribed with incantations or signs intended for religious or mystical benefit, used at shrines or on the doors of houses for protection.

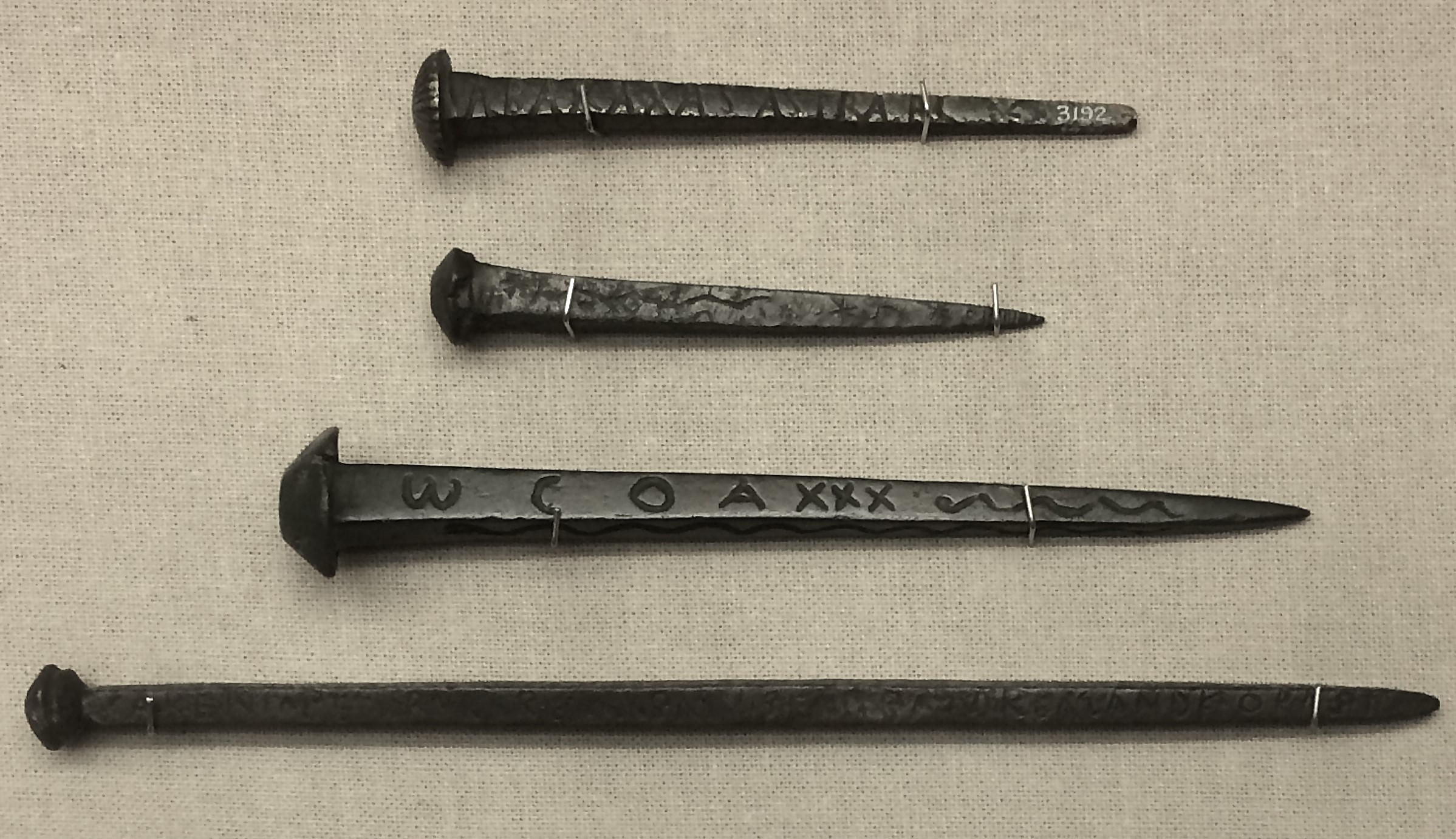
Roman bronze nails with magical signs and inscriptions, 3rd–4th century AD.

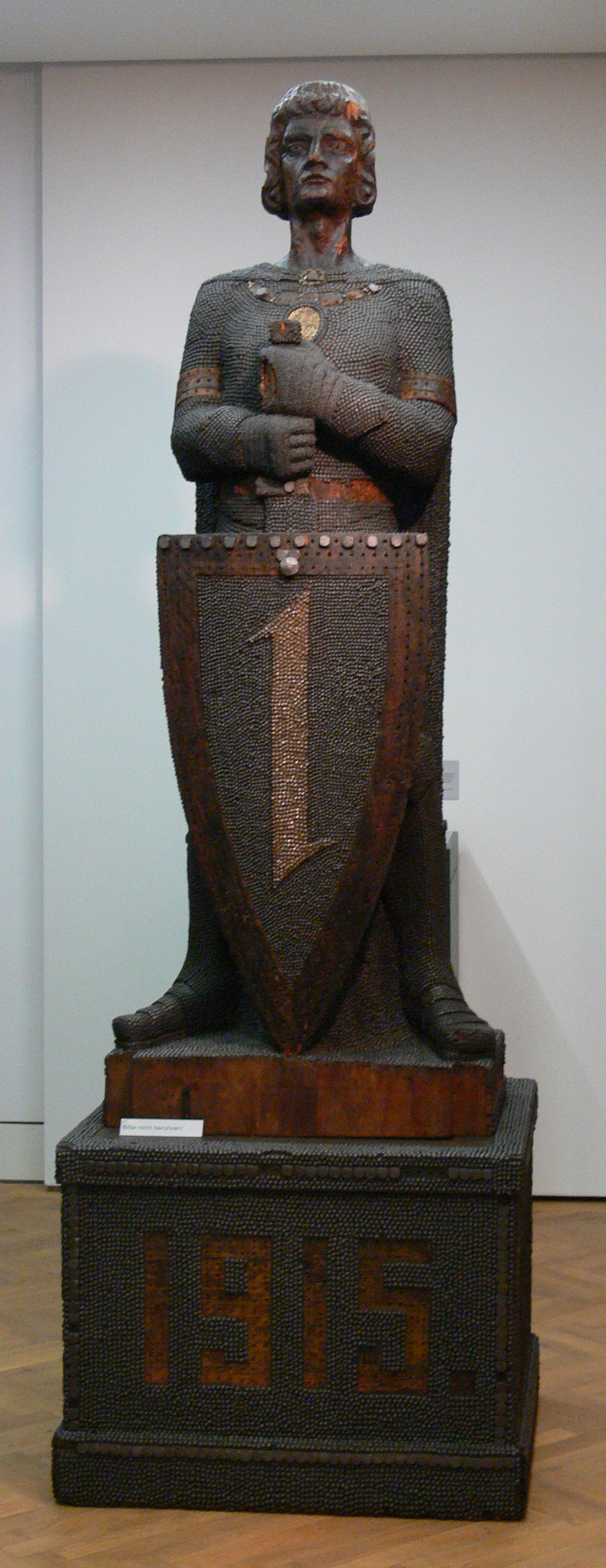
The Iron Roland of Mannheim, an example of Nail Men (1915).

== See also ==
- Date nail – a tagging device utilized by railroads to visually identify the age of a railroad tie
- Denailer – a tool that removes used nails
- Nails (1979 film)
- Rail spike
- Screw
- Truss connector plate
