= Timber recycling =

Recycling process

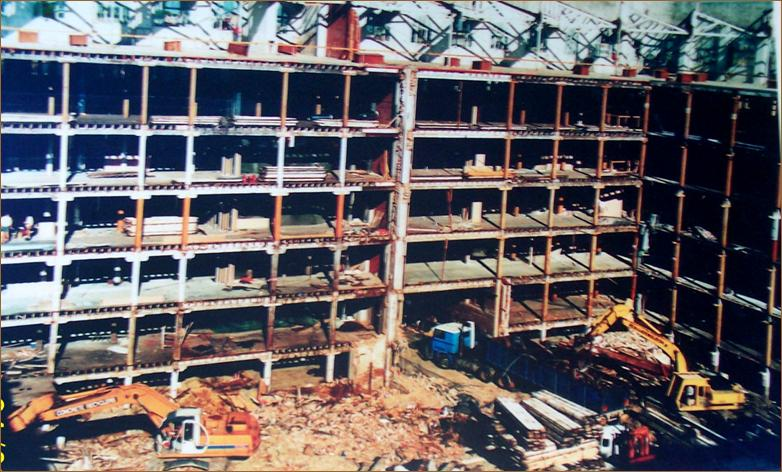
Demolishers pulling timber from an old wool store in Sydney, which will later be re-used for timber flooring.

Timber recycling or wood recycling is the process of turning waste timber into usable products. Recycling timber is a practice that was popularized in the early 1990s as issues such as deforestation and climate change prompted both timber suppliers and consumers to turn to a more sustainable timber source. Recycling timber is the environmentally friendliest form of timber production and is very common in countries such as Australia and New Zealand where supplies of old wooden structures are plentiful. Timber can be chipped down into wood chips which can be used to heat homes or generate electricity.

== Benefits ==
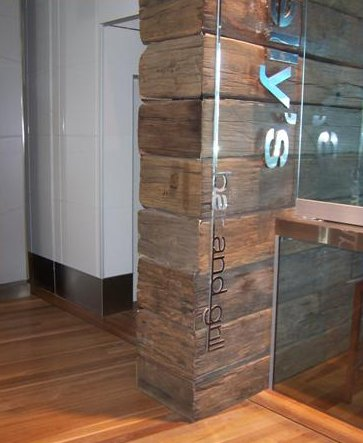
Example of recycled timber as a final product.

Recycling timber has become popular due to its image as an environmentally friendly product. Common belief among consumers is that by purchasing recycled wood, the demand for "green timber" will fall and ultimately benefit the environment. Greenpeace also view recycled timber as an environmentally friendly product, citing it as the most preferable timber source on their website.

The arrival of recycled timber as a construction product has been important in both raising industry and consumer awareness towards deforestation and promoting timber mills to adopt more environmentally friendly practices.

== Drawbacks ==
Some hurdles facing the widespread adoption of recycled timber: sometimes the ends of wall studs need to be trimmed off to stop decay and cracking, thus resulting in a shorter piece of wood; this trimming may result in pieces of wood that do not meet building codes. Though the price may be less than for new wood, the process of selecting usable pieces of salvaged wood, pulling out nails, and refinishing for a new use can be laborious and time-consuming. Demolition must happen in such a way as to preserve as much of the timber as possible in a building, which means more time spent dismantling a building rather than just tearing it down quickly.

The trade in recycled timber is not well-established everywhere, so a reliable supply of usable wood may be hard to come by for builders. There may be a stigma associated with using "used" or "cheap" wood that is perceived to be of not as high quality as "new" wood. Not all pieces of wood in a dismantled building will fit in a new building, and it may be cheaper and easier, from a design and labor perspective, to simply get new wood (ex: wood from a 6-foot (1.8 m) deck being used in a 7-foot (2.1 m) deck). Of course, none of these issues are insurmountable, and they are issues of convenience and logistics rather than structural integrity, but many builders find it easier and less time-consuming to simply get new wood in standard uniform sizes.

== Recycling timber ==
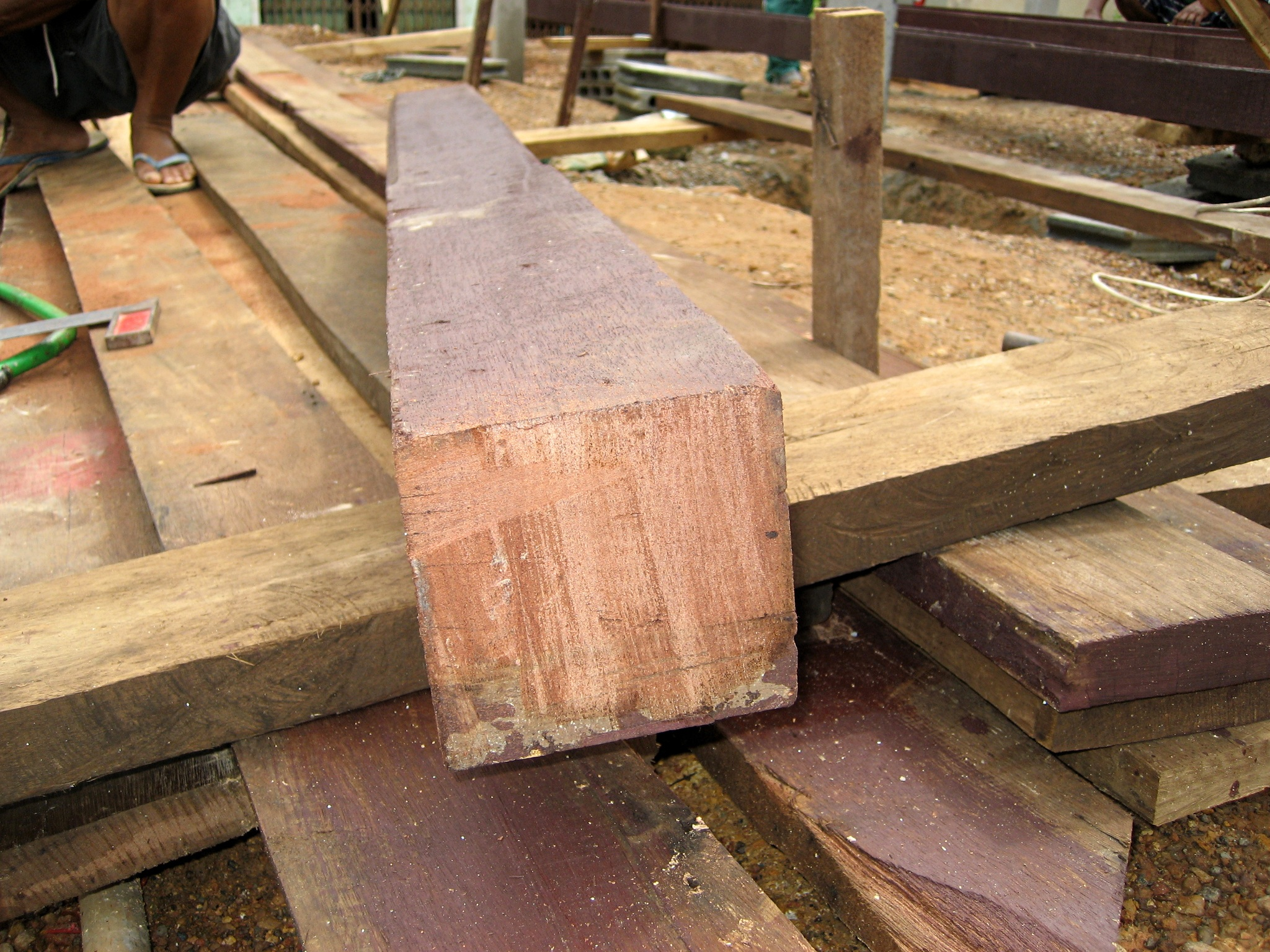
Recycled timber salvaged from a demolished building in Trat, Thailand, is applied to make a new roof.

Recycled timber most commonly comes from old buildings, bridges and wharfs, where it is carefully stripped out and put aside by demolishers. At the same time any usable dimension stone is set aside for reuse. The demolishers then sell the salvaged timber to merchants who then re-mill the timber by manually scanning it with a metal detector, which allows the timber to be de-nailed and sawn to size. Once re-milled the timber is commonly sold to consumers in the form of timber flooring, beams and decking.

== Examples ==
Use of recycling timber is not new. As early as 1948, the 100-metre-tall (330 ft) tower of Golm transmitter near Potsdam, Germany was built from recycled timber. It stood for 31 years.

It was common to reuse wood of dismantled radio towers in the 1930s in Germany, e.g. the former tower of Koblenz radio transmitter was built of wood from a dismantled tower, which carried a T-antenna at Transmitter Muehlacker. The upper parts of the 157-metre-tall wood tower of Ismaning radio transmitter, which stood for 49 years, were built of wood from a smaller radio tower dismantled in 1934.

== See also ==
- Denailer
- Dimension stone – stone recycling and reuse
- Green building and wood
- Lumber
- Nash Timbers
- Natural building
- Pallet crafts
- Recycling
- Sawmill
