= Nash Timbers =

- Type: Private
- Industry: Building and Construction Materials
- Founded: 2003
- Headquarters: Sydney, Australia
- Key people: David Nash, CEO and managing director
- Website: Nash Timbers Homepage

Nash Timbers is a global and domestic distributor of timber flooring, joinery, and beams.

The company, based in Sydney, Australia, was founded in 2003 by David Nash. Nash Timbers is notable for its stance on green timber and for its role as a major informant to key industry figures, concerning the origin and proper use of wood products.

== History ==
Prior to establishing Nash Timbers, managing director David Nash was the managing director of competing timber company Ironwood. He founded Nash Timbers along with a number of colleagues from Ironwood.

In 2005, Nash Timbers expanded to include its own floor laying division, Nash Finishes. The company has since provided timber to a number of large local developments and international developments such as the Hilton Hotel in Fiji and projects in New Zealand, the United Arab Emirates, and the United States.

Recently Nash Timbers has gained importance as a Continuing Professional Education (CPE) and Master Builders Association (MBA) accredited industry informant, promoting the use of timber through sustainable methods, such as recycling or the FSC System. Nash Timbers' environmental sustainability has gained recognition; David is applauded on the Greenpeace website for his work in developing and promoting the recycled timber industry, especially in the 2000 Sydney Olympics.

== Operations ==
=== Recycling timber ===
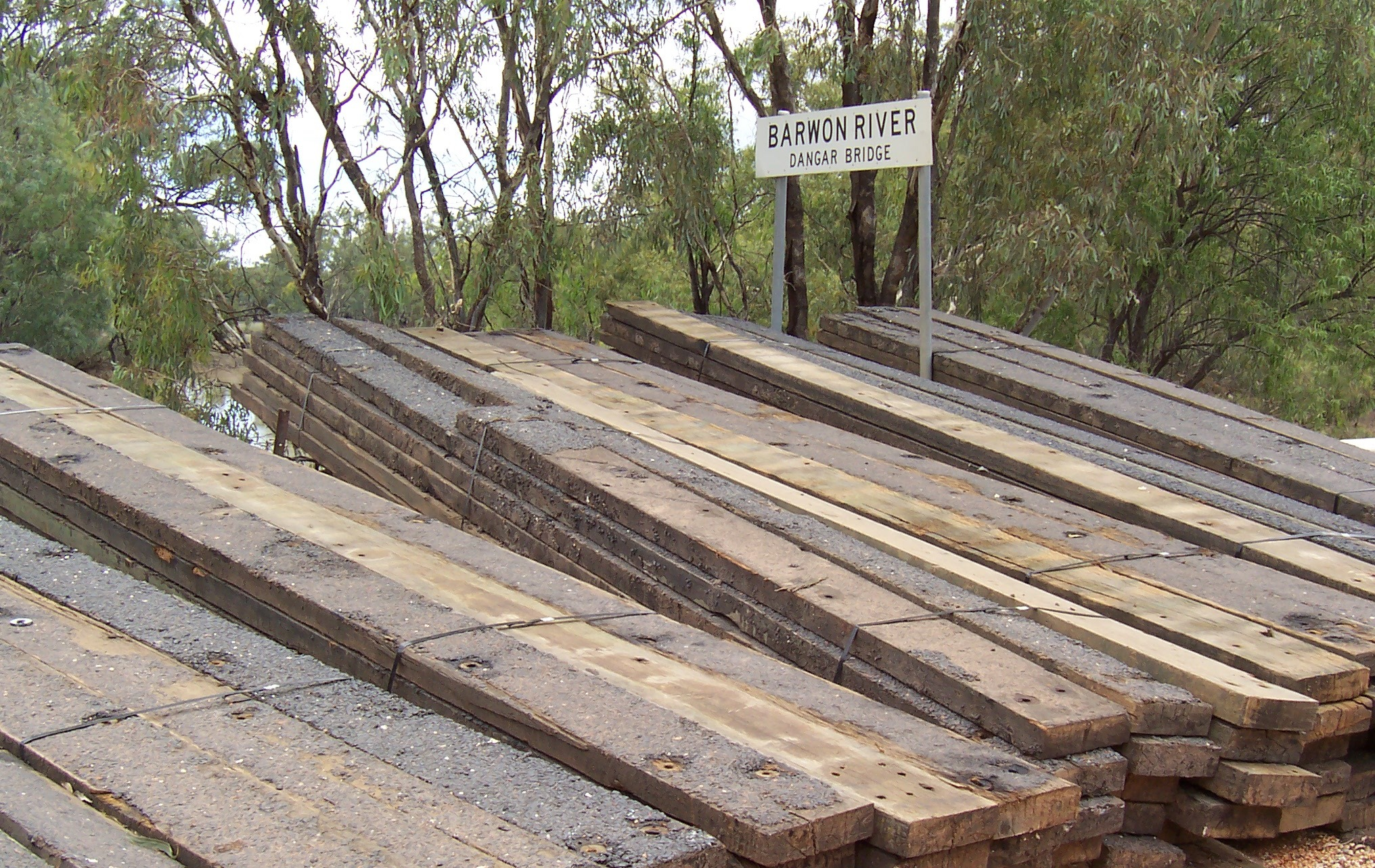
Timber salvaged from a recycled bridge.

A large percentage of Nash Timbers’ products are recycled timber. Nash Timbers has encouraged the stopping State Rail's practice of burning old railway bridges. Nash Timbers mainly source their recycled timber from old bridges and wharves. Once the timber is salvaged it is then milled, which includes the process of removing nails and bolts and cutting the timber down to size.

=== Green timber ===
Due to the scarcity of recyclable timber and the difficulties presented when working with second hand timber, Nash Timbers also provides a large amount of new timber from managed Australian Forests. Nash Timbers abides by the "Australian Forest Certification Scheme", a system that enables all users and consumers of timber to choose stock from sources that have been certified as being derived from sustainable managed forests.

=== Nash Finishes ===
Nash Finishes is the floor laying division of Nash Timbers that was founded in 2005. Nash Finishes lay, sand and finish timber floors.
