= Cat's paw (tool) =

Hand tool for pulling tacks or nails

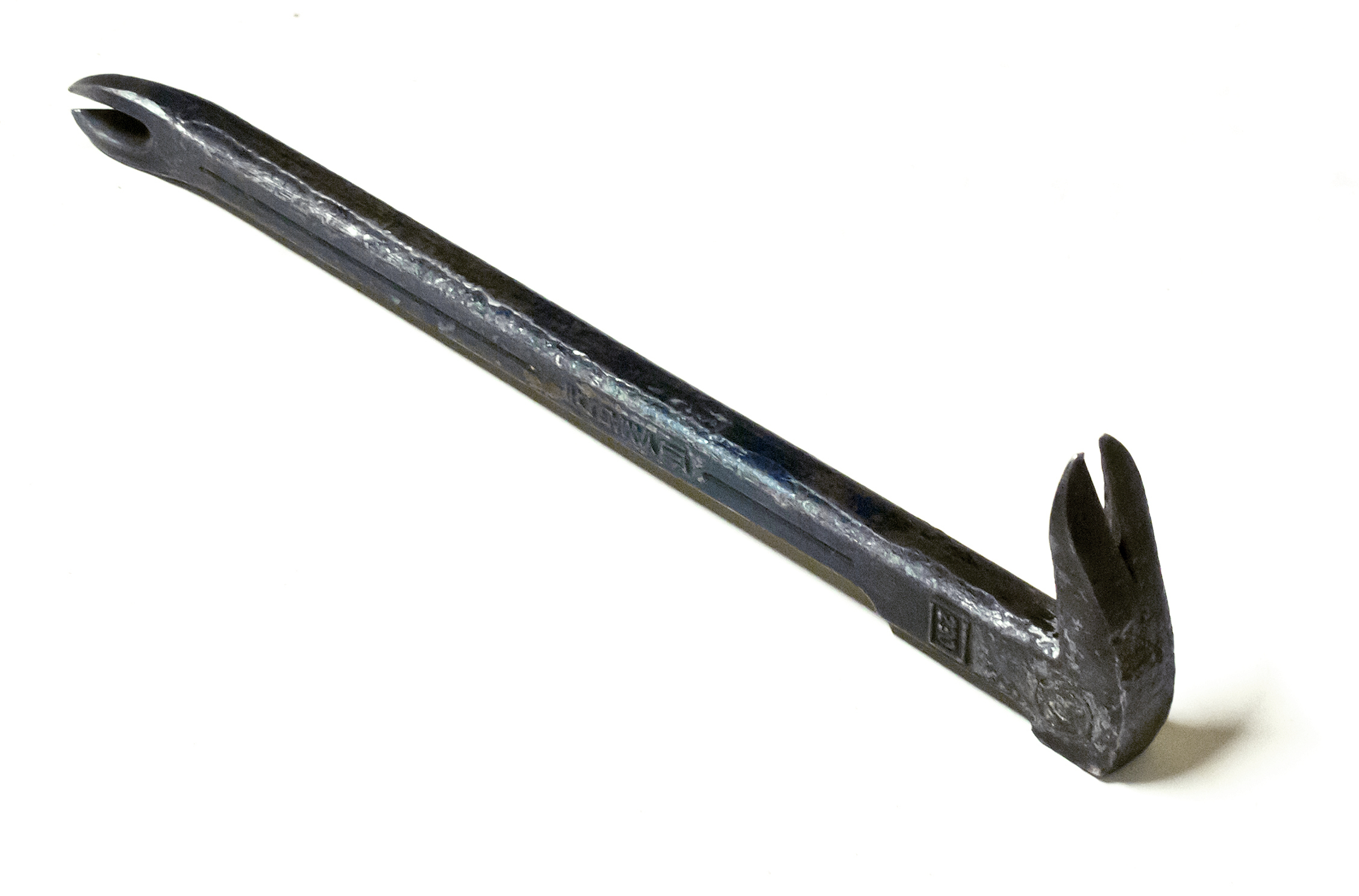
A cat's paw with extracting notches on each end. Typical lengths vary between 8 and 16 inches (20 and 41 cm) long

A cat's paw or cat's claw is a metal hand tool used for extracting nails, typically from wood, using leverage. A standard tool in carpentry, it has a sharp V-shaped tip on one or both ends, which is driven into the wood by a hammer to capture the nailhead. Essentially, it is a smaller, more ergonomic, purpose-designed crowbar.

Historically, the cat's paw had a single significantly rounder, more cup-shaped extracting head, giving it its name. Today, the norm is to have the two much narrower and more pointed heads offset 90-degrees (in plane) from one-another (allowing the bar to be pressed fully down when using the tip on the long end without damaging the surface the free end contacts). By the physics of its design the tip on the short end has substantially more leverage, but is not always convenient to be set with a hammer.

Tool stock is typically hexagonal, though it may be round or rectangular. When the latter is sometimes is flattened on its long end to create a combination pry bar/nail extractor. Terms for each type used by popular retail outlets include "claw bar" when it has a claw on each end, and "moulding bar" if one end is flat.

The cat's paw is well designed for demolition work, able to removed nails from wood, synthetic wood, and concrete, but because it tears up the surface around the nailhead is only used with care in finish work.

== History ==
Prior to advances of the Industrial Revolution, nails were individually hand-made by blacksmiths. As a result, they were generally far more valuable than the wood they were driven into. In North America wood was so abundant that it was commonplace to burn an old structure down in order to salvage the nails from it. As a result, nail pullers were designed to preserve the condition of the nail for reuse, resulting in a slide hammer type design, still in specialty use today.

With machine made nails capped with distinct heads a cat's paw shaped puller appeared; however, the distinctly rounded shape of the extracting head – which gave the tool its name – is so broad at its V-shaped notch opening that driving it into a board to capture a nailhead does significant damage to the wood. To minimize this, and improve the performance of the tool all round, a Japanese-style very narrow, very pointed head has been adopted in recent years. In addition to greater penetration (with both better nailhead grip and less collateral damage), its design offers greater leverage created by a longer, closer to 90-degree fulcrum end, and typically features extractors on both ends.

== Alternative tools ==
As old growth wood has become much more valuable than the nails that hold it in place, there has been a move toward designs that take out nails with less damage.

New designs have been introduced, including the Nail Jack and Nail Hunter nail pullers, which take a pliers-like approach to the old cat's paw design. These tools contain their own built in fulcrum, but can also be struck with a hammer to drive the tips of the tool into the wood with very little damage, allowing them to dig out nails that have been driven into wood at or below the surface. The Nail Hunter nail pulling design has very precise tips that actually come completely together at the ends, for removing finish nails. The pneumatic-powered Nail Kicker allows large numbers of old nails to be efficiently pulled.

== See also ==
- Denailer – power tool used for removing large numbers of nails from used lumber
