= Denailer =

Tool for removing nails from lumber

A denailer is a tool for removing nails from lumber to facilitate its reuse. Two types of denailer are available:

- A stationary denailer is a machine designed for single-purpose use, e.g. pallet refurbishing.
- A portable denailer is a hand-held pneumatically powered tool. It works by driving out the nail from the point end in pieces of nailed lumber which have been pried apart. The process of denailing (removing large numbers of nails from salvaged lumber) is greatly expedited by using this specialized tool.

== See also ==
- Cat's paw (nail puller), an unpowered tool for removing nails
