= James Cook and indigenous peoples =

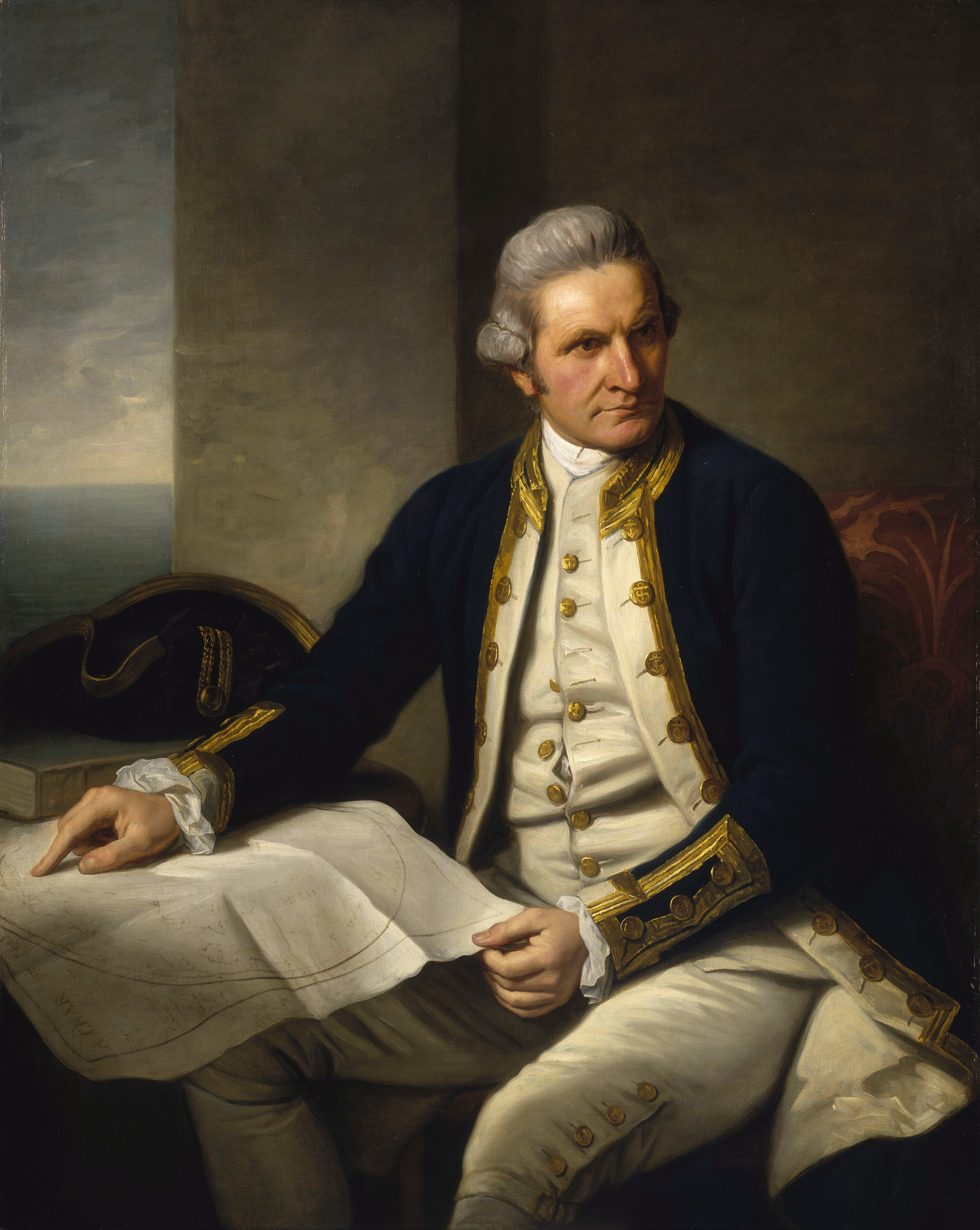
Captain James Cook, 1728-1779

Captain James Cook led three expeditions to the Pacific Ocean from 1768 to 1779 exploring for new lands and navigational routes. He encountered indigenous peoples in Australia, New Zealand, Tonga, Hawaii, Tahiti, British Columbia, Tierra del Fuego, Easter Island, and elsewhere.

In accordance with his instructions, Cook sought to establish friendly relations with indigenous people. He entered into ceremonial friendships with a number of Polynesian chiefs, and many of his crew members formed friendships and consensual sexual relationships with Polynesians. Cook and his crew bartered with indigenous peoples, mostly to replenish his ships with food, water and wood, but also for souvenirs and artefacts.

Cook and his crew shared food, music, song, dance and linguistic and cultural knowledge with various indigenous peoples, particularly in New Zealand, Tahiti, Tonga and Hawaii where they spent considerable time. However, some encounters turned violent, leading to 45 indigenous deaths and 15 deaths of expedition members including Cook himself. His expeditions were also responsible for spreading exotic diseases which eventually resulted in large population losses among some indigenous peoples.

The artworks and the official and unofficial accounts of Cook's voyages were popular in Europe, and raised awareness of the peoples and cultures of the Pacific. However, they also created misconceptions and fostered a particularly European vision of the region.

Cook was treated with respect and even veneration in some places in Polynesia, including Tahiti and Hawaii, where he was sometimes considered to be an ariki (high chief) and a atua (an embodiment of Polynesian gods and ancestor spirits). However, in the 21st century, many indigenous people view Cook as a violent invader and a symbol of the adverse consequences of European contact and colonisation.

== Relationships ==
=== Instructions to Cook ===
The Admiralty provided Cook with written orders on each of his three missions; the orders primarily instructed him where to go, and what to search for, but they also included some directions for his interactions with indigenous peoples. Excerpts from the orders include: "You are to endeavour by all proper means to cultivate a friendship with the natives"; "[show] them every kind of civility and regard, but taking care nevertheless not to suffer yourself to be surprised by them, but to be always upon your guard against any accidents"; "[if] you find any subjects of any European Prince or State upon any part of the coast you may think proper to visit, you are not to disturb them or give them any just cause of offence, but on the contrary to treat them with civility and friendship"

The orders explicitly required Cook to gain the consent of the indigenous peoples before claiming any (inhabited) land for Britain.

In addition to the official orders that Cook received from the Admiralty on all three voyages, on the first voyage he also received guidance from the Royal Society, which was co-sponsoring the voyage. This relatively enlightened guidance was prepared by the Royal Society's president, the Earl of Morton, and it urged Cook to:

exercise the utmost patience and forebearance with respect to the Natives of the several Lands where the Ship may touch. To check the petulance of the Sailors, and restrain the wanton use of Fire Arms. To have it still in view that sheding the blood of those people is a crime of the highest nature. ... They are the natural, and in the strictest sense of the word, the legal possessors of the several Regions they inhabit. . .. They may naturally and justly attempt to repell intruders, whom they may apprehend are come to disturb them in the quiet possession of their country, whether that apprehension be well or ill founded. [Therefore every effort should be made to avoid violence: if it became inevitable, then] the Natives when brought under should be treated with distinguished humanity, and made sensible that the Crew still considers them as Lords of the Country.

=== Cook's approach to establishing relations ===
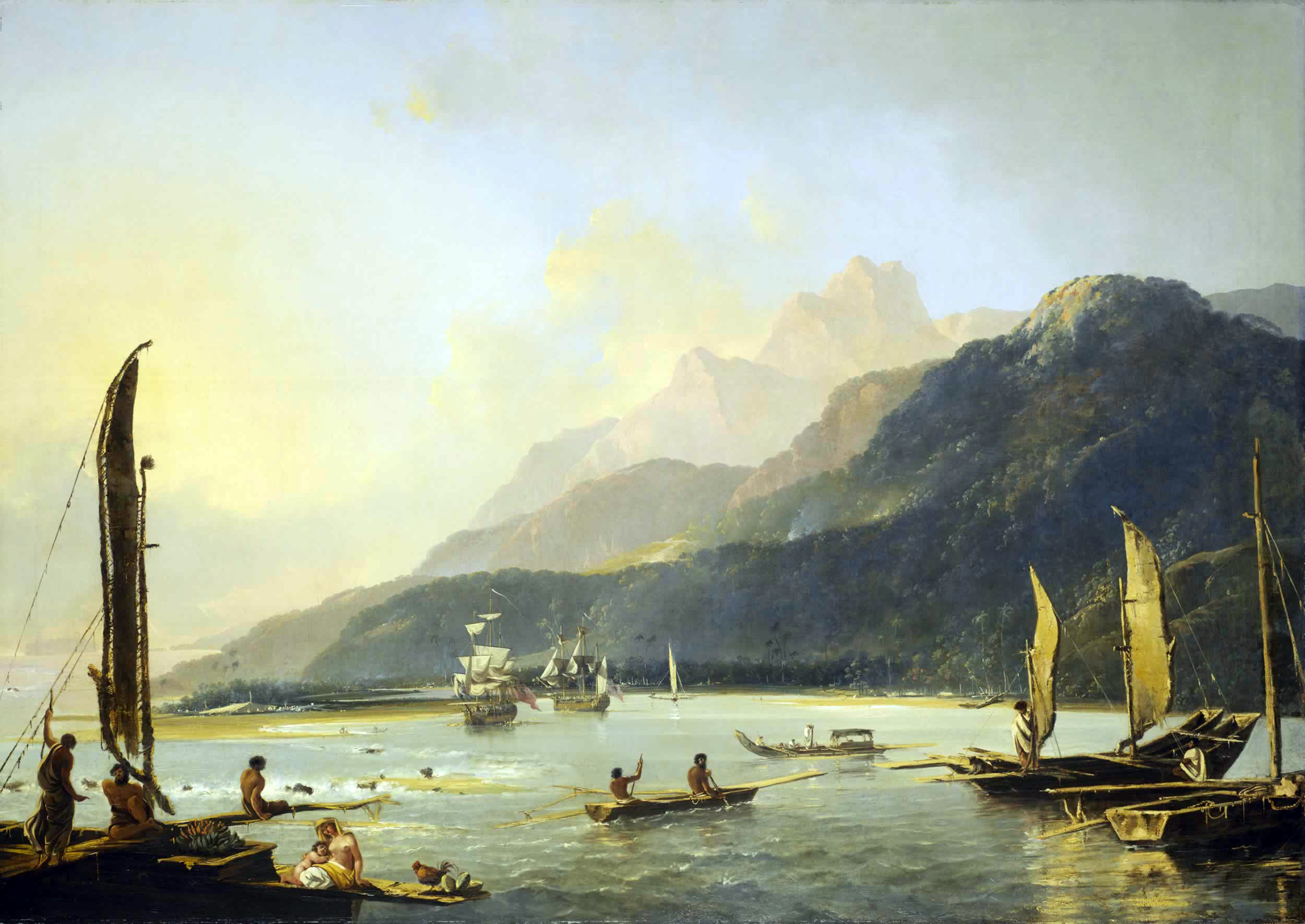
Expedition artist William Hodges painted the Resolution and Adventure in Tahiti, c. 1776.

Interactions with indigenous peoples required Cook to balance competing responsibilities. As a naval commander, he was expected to maintain discipline and authority; yet as a representative of the British Crown, he was required to be diplomatic and accommodating; in his role as an ostensible friend of indigenous leaders, he was expected to show generosity and patience; but as the head of an expedition operating thousands of miles from the nearest resupply points, he needed to safeguard his supplies. Unfortunately, Cook sometimes failed to grasp the nuances of the local culture, and these misunderstandings occasionally led to confusion and even violence.

Cook's failure to fully understand the roles and expectations surrounding his interactions with indigenous people left him vulnerable to both humiliation and danger. When he chose leniency toward Indigenous communities in response to perceived infractions, he was often viewed as weak by both his crew and the local peoples – which sometimes led the indigenous leaders to become emboldened. Conversely, when Cook responded with excessive force, he risked fostering resentment among his men – at times bordering on mutiny – or provoking violent retaliation from indigenous leaders.

Thomas argues that despite Cook's peaceful intentions, violence was always possible when indigenous people resisted contact by the British. Following a violent encounter in 1774, Cook wrote, "we attempt to land in a peaceable manner, if this succeeds its well, if not we land nevertheless and maintain the footing we thus got by the Superiority of our fire arms, in what other light can they than at first look upon us but as invaders of their Country".

Upon initial contact with an indigenous people, Cook usually sought to establish amicable relations by engaging in local friendship rituals such as gift-giving, exchanging names, presenting green boughs and rubbing noses (hongi). He also relied on his Polynesian ship guests—Tupaia, Mahine (Hitihiti) and Mai (Omai)—to act as interpreters, advisers and cultural ambassadors.

When Cook was confronted by situations that demanded difficult decisions, he relied on a mix of diplomacy and coercion. For example, in June 1769, when some items were stolen from his crew in Tahiti, the crew demanded vengeance, but Cook ordered the crew to refrain from violence; instead he confiscated some canoes and threatened to destroy them unless the stolen items were returned.

Cook's intention was to avoid taking sides in local political disputes, but his failure to understand the complexities of the local cultures sometimes made that difficult.

=== Cross-cultural exchanges ===
Cook's expeditions resulted in considerable cultural exchanges with the indigenous peoples of the Pacific region. Several member of his crew learnt to speak Polynesian languages and Polynesian words such as taboo (tabu, tapu or kapu) and tattoo entered the English language. Crew members called Cook's fits of anger "heivas" after the Tahitian word for a public performance, and they called Cook "Toote" after the Tahitian name for him. Many Polynesians also learnt some English, Tupaia and Mai becoming fairly proficient. "Cookees" became a Tahitian word for Europeans.

Polynesians adopted some European foods and Cook's crew also developed a taste for local foods. Dog was a common food in Polynesia and Cook's crew came to eat it with enjoyment. The Māori enjoyed the ship's salted meat and Mai tried to produce wine on his island. Cook brought European livestock and crops to the Pacific and brought exotic plants back to England.

Cook's crew adopted tattoos (tatau) and this became a tradition for British sailors. Tahitians extended the meaning of their own word to also cover European writing. Polynesians admired the work of the crew's artists and Tupaia learnt to draw and paint in the European style. Tahitians, Tongans and Hawaiians staged boxing and wrestling matches in which the British sometimes participated and they often exchanged musical performances and dancing.

Several Polynesians joined Cook's expeditions as ship guests. Tupaia advised Bank on Polynesian culture and explained Polynesian navigational methods to Cook, helping him make a chart of South Pacific islands. Mai, in his two years in England, became a celebrity and an unofficial cultural ambassador for his homeland. On his return to the Tahitian islands he attempted to spread knowledge of England.

Cook and his officers attended Polynesian ceremonies and sacred rituals while Polynesians in their turn sometimes observed and participated in British religious services and burials. When one crew member died in Hawaii, the Hawaiian priests agreed that he should be buried in their local shrine and they turned the funeral into as cross-cultural ritual. After Cook's death, his memory and physical remains were incorporated into Hawaiian rituals for decades.

Many Polynesians became friends and lovers with their British visitors, and some crew members attempted desertion to be with their Polynesian lovers. Cook entered into ceremonial friendships with Polynesian chiefs for practical reasons but also developed emotional attachments to some of them.

European knowledge of the indigenous cultures of the Pacific region increased with the publication of the official and unofficial accounts of the voyages. These accounts were popular but spread some misconceptions about indigenous peoples. (Note: The official account of the first voyage was one of the ten most borrowed books in British libraries in the late 18th century. The official account of the third voyage sold out within three days and was followed by numerous cheap and abridged editions.) The art of the voyages also proved popular, many works being reproduced in cheap editions and as book illustrations. The artists strove for scientific accuracy but sometimes distorted actual events and fostered a particularly European vision of the Pacific and its cultures.

=== Cross-cultural incidents and misunderstandings ===
Efforts by Cook to establish amicable relations during initial encounters did not always proceed as intended, often due to language barriers and vast cultural differences. When he first made contact with the Māori in October 1769, he came ashore with the aim of establishing friendly relations. The Māori performed a haka and attempted to exchange weapons; Cook's crew misinterpreted the Māori's attempts to grab the crew's weapons, and a crewman shot and killed a Māori individual. In an attempt to mend relations, Cook captured three Māori and brought them board his ship, where he offered them gifts and food as a gesture of goodwill. (Note: After the episode, in his journal, Cook reflected on the decisions he faced during the encounter.)

Another type of cultural misunderstanding arose when Cook's crew gathered supplies or food without compensating the local indigenous peoples, or received gifts without appropriate reciprocation. In Tahiti on the first voyage, Cook's crew failed to ask permission to take fish, trees, and fruit. The failure of Cook's crew to understand local customs and culture led to Tahitians becoming offended when some of the crew took rocks – to use as ship's ballast – from a sacred marae without permission. In Hawaii, the crew took some carved images from a shrine, but returned them when requested by a local priest. During the first voyage, on the east coast of Australia, Cook's crew captured turtles for their own consumption, which was contrary to local Guugu Yimidhirr totemic relations with animals, as well as customs surrounding sharing food. In Tahiti, Cook confiscated some canoes to force the return of stolen items, without regard for the fresh fish that was in the canoes at the time – which became spoiled while the canoes were held as ransom. In British Columbia on the third voyage, while replenishing the ship, the local peoples requested payment for grass, lumber, and fresh water collected by the crew.

=== Cook as chief or deity ===
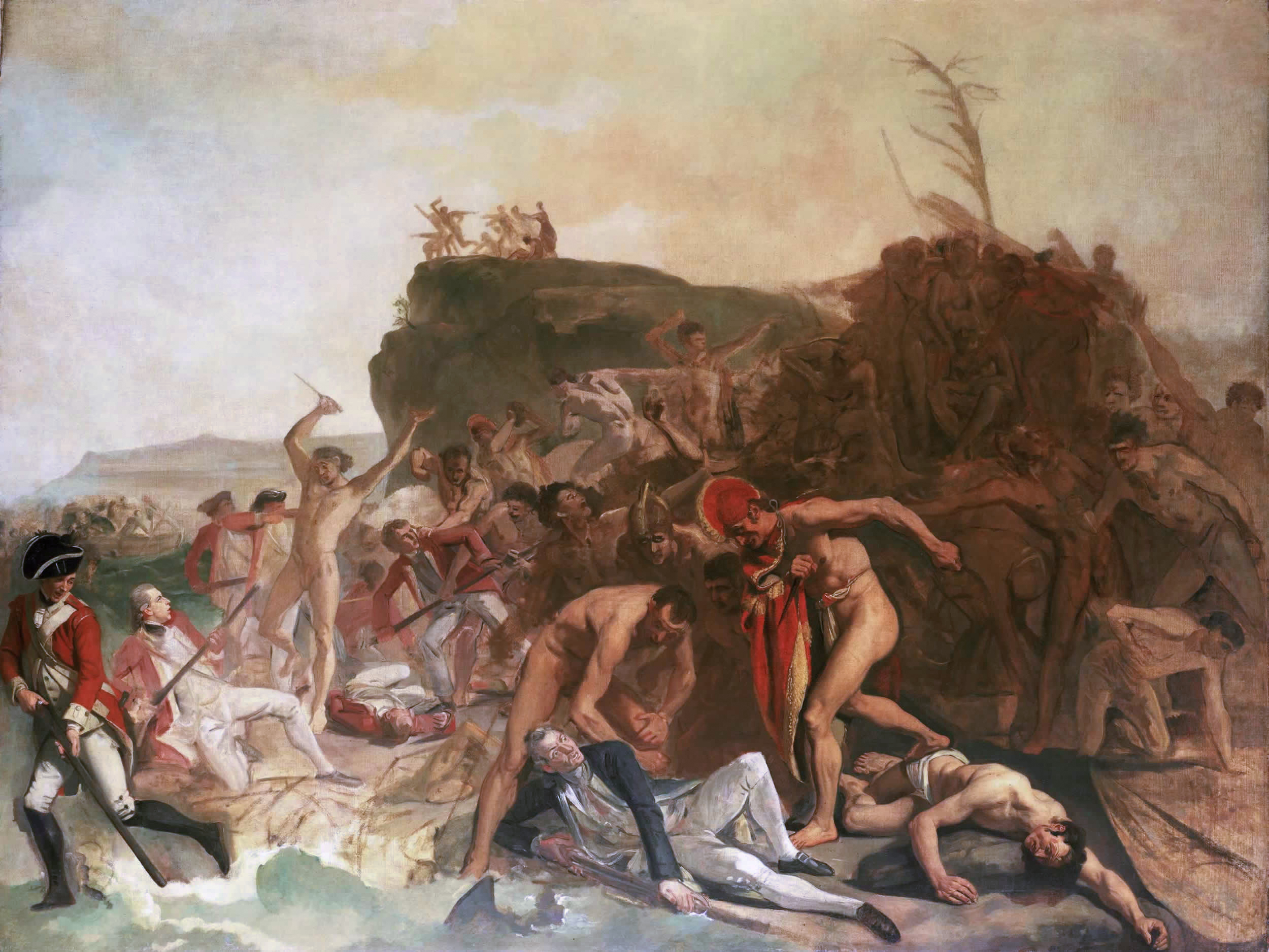
The Death of Captain Cook by Johan Zoffany (c. 1795) is one of several paintings of this event.

Cook was considered by some indigenous peoples to be an ariki (high chief), and therefore an atua (the embodiment of a Polynesian god or ancestor spirit). (Note: In Hawaii, the word for gods is "akua") (Note: Regarding the differences between atua and Western gods, Thomas writes: " Cook was not taken to be a god, not if a god is a supreme being, of a supernatural or transcendental nature, categorically distinct from any humans. Polynesians recognized no such gulf between the beings they called atua or in Hawaii akua and living men and women. Gods themselves had varied natures, ranging from the abstract and elemental, in the case of the original creatorbeings, to the essentially human and historical, in that of deified ancestors of chiefs. But divinity and humanity always shaded together. From the perspective of a common person, a chief was so superior as to be divine, and certain priests were not just representatives of gods but embodiments of them" Williams writes " Much attention focused on the cultural and linguistic problems involved in the crude translation of the Hawaiian akua or Tahitian atua as 'god' ina Judaic/Christian sense. Greg Dening pointed out that in Polynesia akua/atua could refer to wooden statues, birds, sharks, chiefs and sorcerers. To incorporate a powerful visitor into this pantheon would not be surprising,") In New Zealand, some of the indigenous people considered Cook's ship itself, the Endeavour, to be an atua.

Cook's status as a ariki in much of Polynesia was partially due to the way he carried himself during the initial landfall: he was always the first to step ashore, and made gestures of friendship. One of the midshipmen described Cook's process as "[he] would land alone unarm'd, or lay aside his Arms, and sit down, when they threaten'd with theirs, throwing them Beads, Knives, and other little presents, then by degrees advancing nearer, till by Patience, and forbearance, he gain'd their friendship."

Throughout Polynesia, many chiefs greeted Cook and they engaged in ritual ceremonies of name-exchange and gift-giving. The ceremonies typically involved exchanging genealogies, names, and insignia (for example, a weapon) – these rituals also involved the exchange of mana and life force. In an example of misunderstanding, in Tonga, Cook failed to appreciate the importance of rank, and engaged in a name-exchange ceremony with a lower-level chief, resulting the a loss of status for Cook.

In Hawaii, Cook's status as an akua (the Hawaiian version of atua) was associated with the time and manner of his arrival, particularly on his second visit in late 1778. Many Hawaiians thought Cook was the Polynesian god Lono. (Note: Both Cook and the Hawaiian king Kalaniʻōpuʻu were referred to as Lono.) One of the reasons was that Cook's arrival coincided with the Makahiki, a Hawaiian harvest festival of worship for Lono. Some scholars believe that the form of HMS Resolution – specifically, the mast formation, sails and rigging – resembled certain significant artefacts that formed part of the season of worship. (Note: Some academics state that Cook's clockwise route around the island of Hawaii before making landfall resembled the processions that took place in a clockwise direction around the island during the Lono festivals. It has been argued (most extensively by Marshall Sahlins) that such coincidences were the reasons for Cook's initial deification as Lono by some Hawaiians.) (Note: The academic Gananath Obeyesekere supports the theory that the Hawaiians did not consider Cook to be a deity.) During the second visit, several members of Cook's expedition realised that the Hawaiians thought Cook was a deity. According to historian Glyndwr Williams, there is still scholarly debate over the extent to which Cook was considered an ariki (high chief) or akua (god) in Hawaii.

In Polynesia, the role of ariki carried significant ramifications for relationships and power. It is unlikely that Cook understood the expectations and responsibilities associated with the role. Anne Salmond wrote "Over the past ten years he had exchanged gifts, including his own clothing, and sometimes his name, with a series of Polynesian leaders. In the course of these exchanges, according to Pacific understandings, something of the life force of those people had entered his being. Such relationships, especially between ariki, were often turbulent and dangerous. When high chiefs came together, their ancestor gods also met. Ariki were the living representatives of the gods, and imbued with their power. A man caught between two sets of gods was 'two-sided', and could be torn in contradictory directions".

Anthropologist Anne Salmond theorised that Cook's treatment as an ariki (high chief) gave Cook an elevated sense of power, and may have contributed to his more aggressive behaviour on the third voyage.

The perception of Cook could change over time, for example, if the indigenous peoples witnessed behaviour that did not conform to their expectations: such as in New Zealand, where Cook failed to take revenge for the deaths of ten crew members.

In Hawaii, during the second visit, Cook was viewed as an akua (god). Cook departed the islands on 4 February 1779, consistent with the cycle of the Makahiki season. But one of the ships was damaged in a gale, and Cook was forced to return to the island. This confused the Hawaiians, because Lono was not supposed to return for another year. The ship received a chilly greeting; historian Thomas theorises that the Hawaiians viewed the timing of Cook's return as a challenge to king Kalaniʻōpuʻu.

In Tahiti, after Cook's death, he was venerated as an atua with rituals and offerings – but over time the rituals ceased and the memory of Cook diminished. British visitors to Hawaii from the 1780s reported that Hawaiians regretted killing Cook and that he was regarded as a Lono-nui, or ancestral being, who would come again and forgive them. In 1823, the missionary William Ellis reported that Cook's bones were still held in a shrine and used in ceremonies. However, by the 1830s, the influence of Protestant missionaries had led to a view, particularly among young Hawaiians, that god had killed Cook because he had spread venereal disease and allowed himself to be worshipped. (Note: Although members of Cook's expedition did spread sexually transmitted diseases to Hawaii, Cook tried to prevent this and it is unlikely that he had sex with Hawaiians.)

== Diplomacy ==
=== Diplomacy and conflict resolution ===
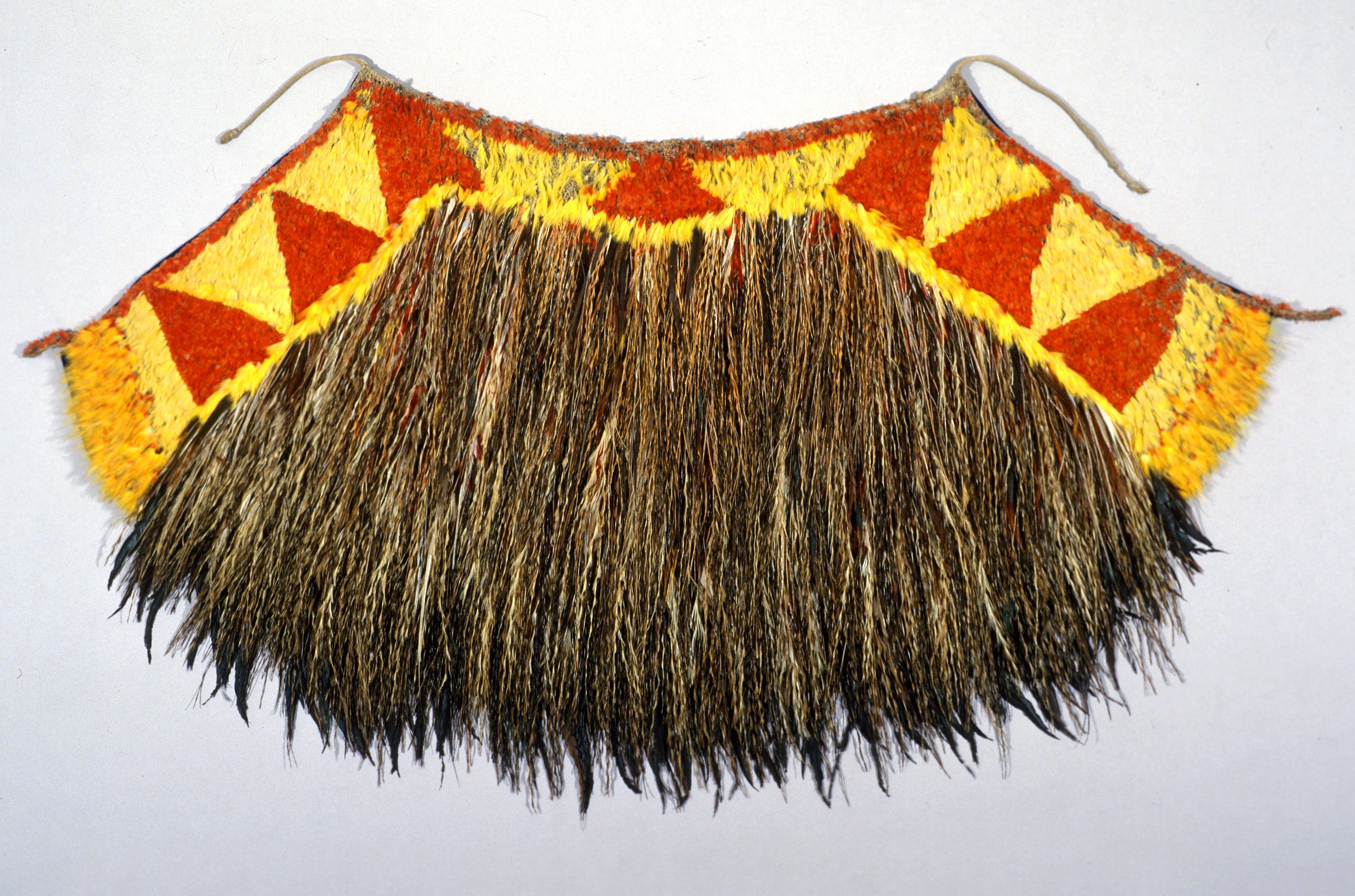
This this Hawaiian ʻAhu ʻula (feather cloak) was presented to Cook in 1778 by the king Kalaniʻōpuʻu as part of a gift-giving ritual.

Friendships with local leaders were important to Cook and sometimes played a role in resolving disputes. In Huahine, in September 1773, a ship naturalist – while exploring alone – was attacked, stripped of his clothing and tools, and struck violently on the head. Rather than retaliate – as some of his crew urged – Cook instead engaged in ritual gift exchanges with the local chief, and most of the belongings were returned. When the naturalists insisted that all the belonging be returned, Cook declined to press the matter further, prioritizing good relations over retaliation.

Cook sometimes punished his own crew for injuring indigenous people: during the second voyage, in August 1774, Cook witnessed one of his marines shoot an indigenous man on the island of Tanna. Cook called the ship's surgeon to try to save him, but the injured man died. Cook was furious and had the marine arrested and prepared to have him flogged. Officers intervened to stop the flogging, and Cook instead imprisoned the marine for two months.

On some occasions, Cook ignored the wishes of his crew to retaliate for real or perceived harms. In the third voyage, in February 1777, Cook landed in New Zealand with the knowledge that the Māori had killed ten members of the Adventure's crew a few years earlier. Despite that, Cook treated the Māori with respect, even inviting them into his cabin. Some members of Cook's crew were confused and angered by their leader's failure to take revenge.

=== Violence and punishment ===
The level of violence fluctuated throughout the three voyages. Many encounters were almost entirely peaceful while in other cases generally friendly relations were punctuated by sporadic violence. Overall, at least 45 indigenous people were killed by Cook's crew, including two killed by Cook. (Note: Glyndwr Williams states that on the day of Cook's death, seventeen islanders were killed on or near the shore (Kaawaloa), and eight killed elsewhere on that day. Beaglehole states that the Hawaiians lost "four chiefs...and thirteen others" in "the wretched affray". According to Williams and Beaglehole other Hawaiians were killed in revenge attacks in days immediately following Cook's death, but they don't give a number. Nicholas Thomas quotes Captain Clerke as saying that "5 or 6" Hawaiians were killed by the British in revenge attacks (on the days following the day of Cook's death); but Thomas adds that he suspects this was an underestimate. Cook and his crew killed a total of nine (perhaps thirteen) Māori. Thomas suggests that the total number of Hawaiians killed is "at least thirty", and that the number of non-Hawaiians killed (in all voyages) was fifteen, for a total of 45 indigenous deaths. Among those deaths, Cook was responsible for killing a Māori man and a Hawaiian.) Fifteen of the crew were killed by indigenous people, including Cook himself. (Note: Ten crew from Adventure were killed in December 1773, and Cook and four marines on the day of Cook's death.) The worst lethal violence occurred in New Zealand during the first and second voyage and in Hawaii over a few days in 1779.

When encountering indigenous peoples, Cook's intentions were to act in an enlightened manner and to establish peaceful relations. In spite of Cook's intentions, violent encounters arose in several locations during his voyages. When conflict was likely, Cook implemented measures to minimise harm, such as instructing his crew to load their firearms with small shot, which was generally non-lethal. When Cook was not present, his crew sometimes disobeyed his orders and changed their weapons to use more fatal musket balls. (Note: One of Cook's crew members stated that Cook's use of small shot (in his own firearm) may have contributed to his death, since it failed to injure Cook's assailant.)

The British often resorted to violence when they felt threatened or believed that indigenous people were engaging in theft or dishonest trade. The anthropologist Anne Salmond states that, in Tahitian culture, stealing was admired when conducted successfully, but sometimes punished with death. Cook generally overlooked minor thefts, but punished thefts of official property, especially essential equipment, more severely. In order to avoid excessive bloodshed, he usually responded to thefts with warning shots, floggings, the seizure of canoes or by holding indigenous leaders hostage until the stolen items were returned. Cook also imposed disciplinary measures on members of his crew who stole from or inflicted harm upon Indigenous people. (Note: Over the course of his voyages, Cook ordered floggings for his own crew as follows: 28 floggings on the first expedition, 33 on the second, and 66 on the third.) On the third voyage, he increasingly used more severe non-lethal punishments against indigenous people, including the destruction of their canoes and homes, extreme floggings and cropping their ears, which some crew members considered excessive.

== Trading and commerce ==
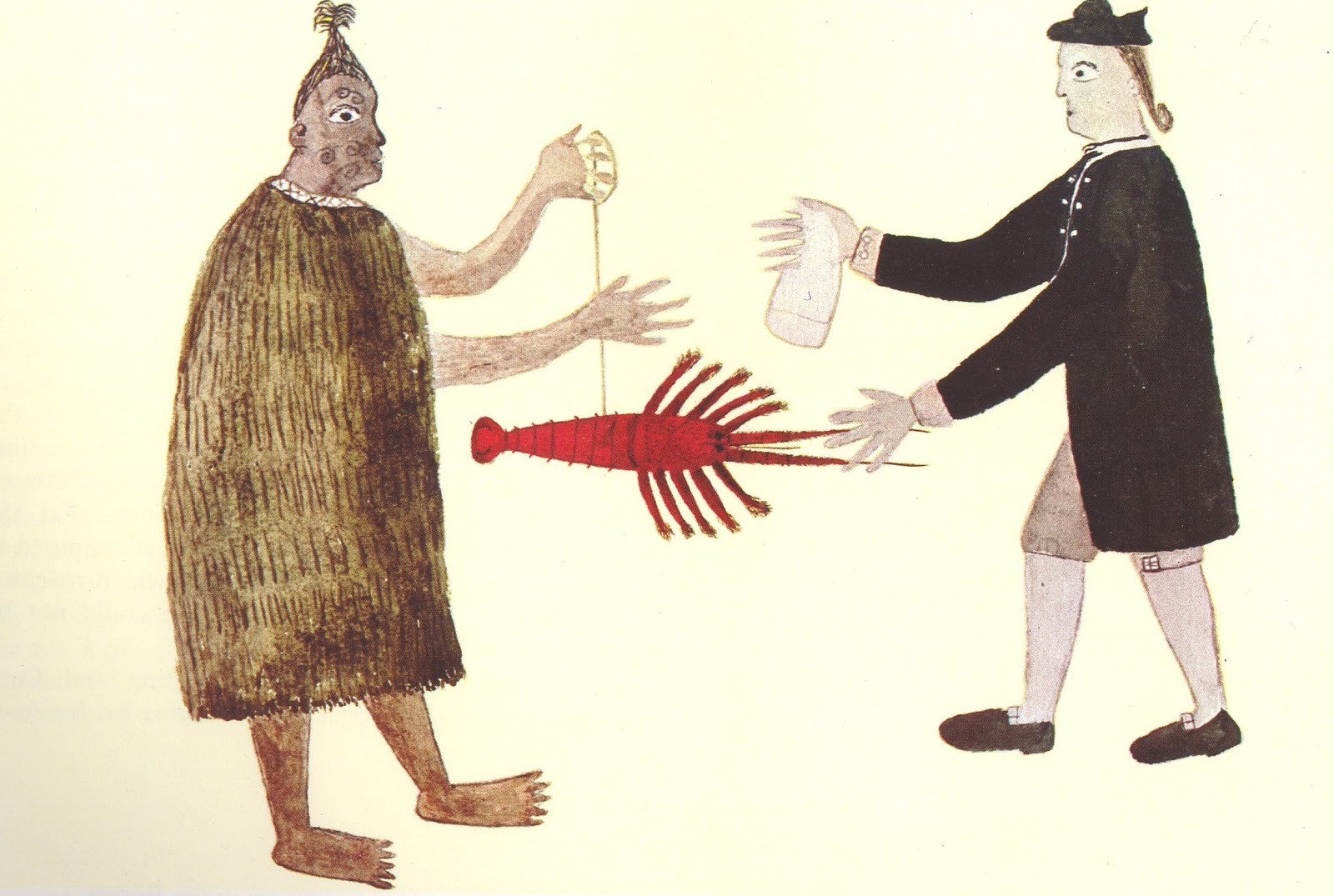
Polynesian inerpreter Tupaia drew this illustration, of a Māori man and Joseph Banks trading a crayfish and cloth, during the first voyage, c. 1769.

=== Instructions regarding commerce ===
Commerce was an important underlying goal of all of Cook's voyages. Cook's official orders included instructions to find new lands to trade with, and (for the third voyage) to locate new passages to shorten travel distances. The instructions also requested that he find and bring back "metals, minerals, or valuable stones, or any extraneous fossils, you are to bring home specimens of each, as also of the seeds of such trees, shrubs, plants, fruits and grains". However, the orders did not contain instructions to establish trading posts, or to initiate trade relations for specific goods.

=== Bartering for provisions ===
Cook's orders instructed him to barter with indigenous peoples to replenish his ship's provisions. During the bartering, Cook primarily received food from the indigenous peoples, including fish, pigs, plantains, bananas, coconuts, and breadfruit. In return Cook a gave items such as iron nails, beads, copper, knives, and cloth. The crew also bartered individually with indigenous peoples, often to purchase "curiosities", hatchets, and other souvenirs, and also for sexual favours. Several times, Cook depleted the available foodstuffs of the place they were visiting. In some places, the desires of the locals evolved over time: on an early visit to Huahine, Cook was able to buy provisions with colored feathers, but on a later visit, the Tahitians required axes as payment.

=== Introduction of animals and plants ===
Cook carried a wide variety of livestock on his ships including pigs, goats, cattle, horses, rabbits, turkeys, and sheep. The ships also carried cats and dogs as pets. The livestock were used for a variety of purposes: primarily for consumption by the crew, but also to place onto lands they visit to establish breeding pairs, and sometimes given to indigenous individuals as gifts.

The ships also carried vermin, such as the house mouse (Mus musculus) and Norway rat (Rattus norvegicus). Norway rats were introduced into Polynesia in the late 1700s, although it is not certain if Cook was the first to introduce them. Cook was the first European to introduce the house mouse into Hawaii, in 1778.

In 1777, in Tahiti, Cook felt that the Resolution had too many rats, so he pulled the ship close to shore and had the crew rig a large rope from the ship leading to the land, hoping some of the rats would leave the ship.

Cook carried plants and seeds on his ships, and planted gardens on several islands. The plants included wheat, carrots, peas, mustard, cabbages, strawberry, parsley, potatoes, oranges, lemons, pomelo, limes, watermelons, turnips, onions, beans, and parsnip. The crops were intended for the benefit of the indigenous peoples, and also to feed future European visitors. The crew also planted some plants that they obtained from the islands, such as pineapple and grapes (using cuttings taken from vines planted earlier by Spaniards). In New Zealand, when he encountered some men that appeared to be important, he gave them a variety of seeds and plants, as well as breeding pairs of pigs and chickens, hoping that they would propagate and stock the island over time.

== Health and sexual relations ==
=== Sexual relations ===
Sexual relations between European crews and indigenous persons was widespread in nearly every place visited. Sexual mores differed greatly between Europe and the places visited by Cook; of Hawaii, anthropologist Marshall Sahlins wrote "We can see why Hawaiians are so interested in sex. Sex was everything: rank, power, wealth, land, and the security of all these." Most sexual encounters were consensual, but they often involved payment in the form of trinkets, feathers, or iron nails. In Hawaii, some women believed that sex with white men would increase their mana (spiritual power). In some situations, particularly in New Zealand during the second voyage, Maori men forced women to have sex with the crewmen.

Based on the journals of Cook and his crew, Cook never engaged in sexual relations with indigenous women during his voyages.

=== Contagious diseases ===
Many European explorers – including members of Cook's crews – carried communicable diseases such as syphilis, (Note: There is scientific debate about the origins of syphilis. It was present in the Americas before the arrival of Europeans. It is not certain if it was transmitted from the Americas to Europe.) gonorrhea, tuberculosis, malaria, dysentery, smallpox, influenza, and hepatitis. These diseases caused a significant decline in some local populations, who often had no natural resistance. Cook's crews transmitted some of these diseases to indigenous peoples in Tahiti, Hawaii, British Columbia, and New Zealand. In Hawaii, Cook's crews were the first Europeans to introduce some diseases to the local population. (Note: In the 1800s, missionaries in Hawaii sought to undermine Cook's reputation by blaming him for the initial introduction of STDs to the islands.)

Prior to the arrival of Europeans, yaws was endemic across Polynesia. Yaws had symptoms very similar to syphilis, and confused Cook's naturalists when they attempted to determine if and how syphilis was spreading.

=== Sexually transmitted diseases ===
Cook took measures to mitigate the spread of sexually transmitted diseases (STDs), including issuing orders that prohibited women from boarding his ships and instructing his crew to refrain from sexual relations with indigenous women. In Hawaii, he specifically ordered that "no woman was to board either of the ships" and that any crew member known to have an STD was strictly forbidden from engaging in sexual activity, stating these directives were intended "to prevent as much as possible the communicating [of] this fatal disease to a set of innocent people". Despite these efforts, Cook's orders were frequently disregarded by members of his crew. On Cook's third voyage, when they returned to Hawaii after nine months searching for the Northwest passage, Cook was saddened to discover that syphilis had apparently traveled to additional islands since their first visit nine months earlier.

== Cook's observations ==
Cook's instructions required him to report on the indigenous peoples he encountered. Over time, he developed an interest in their cultures and his observations became more sophisticated as he attempted to understand cultural differences and describe them in a detached manner.

Cook described the Māori as brave, noble, open, benevolent, devoid of treachery, and having few vices. He believed that Aboriginal Australians were happier than the British because they enjoyed social equality in a warm climate and were provided with all the necessities of life, and therefore had no need of trade with Britain. While such views partly reflected Enlightenment ideas of the noble savage living in a state of nature, they were contrary to the popular notion in Britain and among Cook's crew members that indigenous people were savages living in societies inferior to British civilisation. Thomas argues that Cook's depiction of Aboriginal Australians was also an implied critique of his own mission to open up trade with new lands.

Cook sometimes questioned the idea that contact with Europeans would benefit indigenous people. In 1773, he wrote: "we debauch their Morals already too prone to vice and we interduce among them wants and perhaps diseases which they never before knew and which serves only to disturb that happy tranquillity they and their fore Fathers had injoy'd. If any one denies the truth of this assertion let him tell me what the Natives of the whole extent of America have gained by the commerce they have had with Europeans. [sic]"

Whereas his crew saw the cannibalism of the Māori as a sign of their savagery, Cook viewed it as merely a custom that they would discard when they became more united and less prone to internal wars. He reported that the Polynesian peoples shared a common ancestry, a tradition of long sea voyages, and had developed into different nations over time. According to Thomas, his comments reflect a more historical and less idealised approach to understanding indigenous cultures than was common in this period.

Cook sought to refute misconceptions about indigenous peoples. His comments on Aboriginal Australians were a rebuttal of William Dampier's disparaging account. Thomas asserts that Cook's depiction of Aboriginal Australians was an implied critique of Cook's mission to open up trade with new lands. Thomas argues that Cook was indirectly responding to accounts by explorer William Dampier, whose descriptions of Aboriginal Australians had led some Europeans to speculate on a supposed close relation to black Africans. At the time, apologists for slavery often argued that people of African descent were not of the same species as white Europeans, using such claims to justify the slave trade.

He countered the British belief in the promiscuity of Tahitian women, arguing that while they had a different attitude to sex, married women and many unmarried women did not provide sex for gifts. Nevertheless, Cook himself sometimes used derogatory terms for indigenous people and made adverse judgements without observing their cultures closely and questioning them on their practices and beliefs.

== Perception of Cook by indigenous peoples in the modern era ==
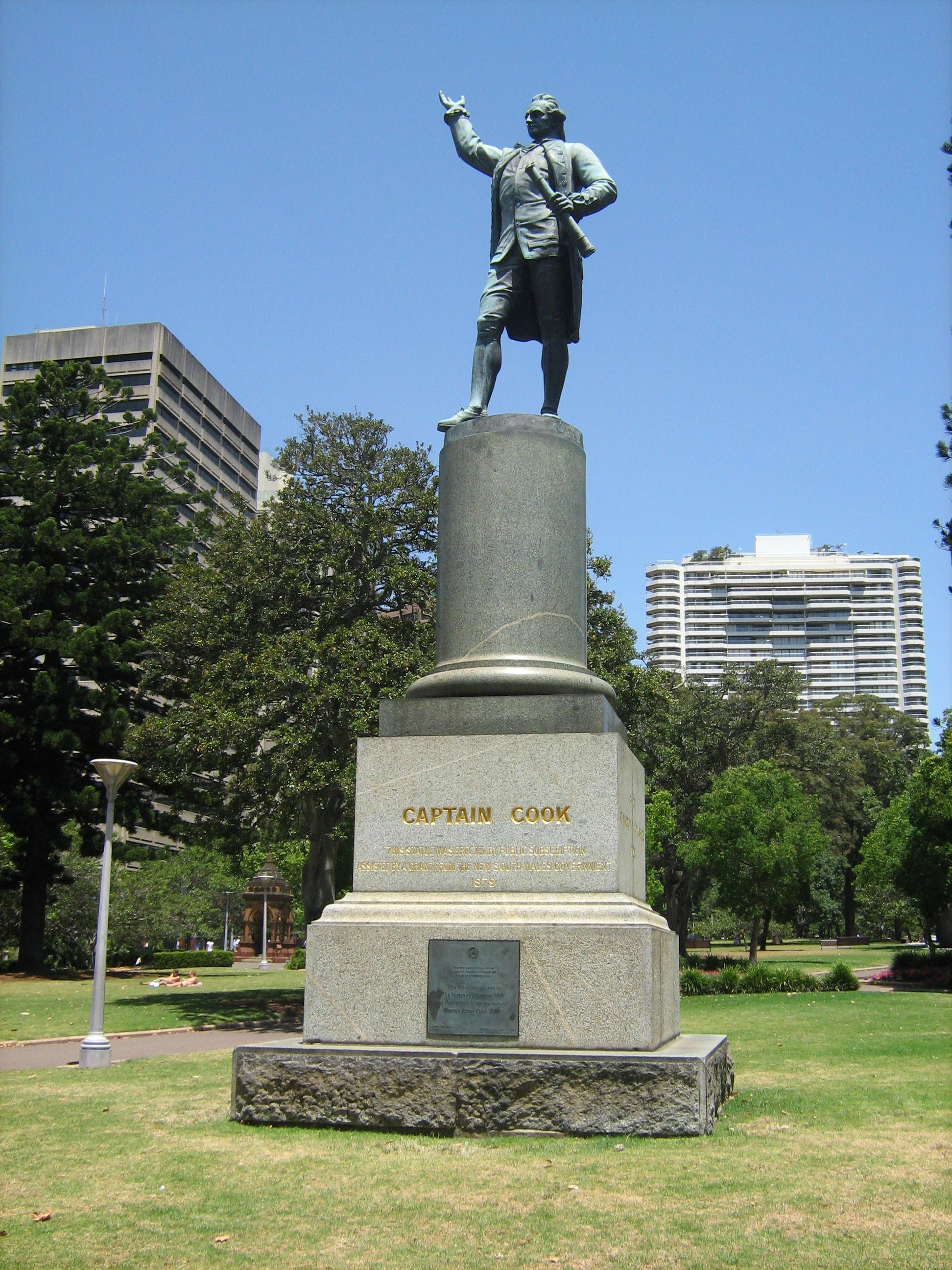
Some indigenous peoples consider statues of Cook, such as this statue in Sydney, to be symbolic of colonialism.

The perception of Cook varies widely across the places he visited. The Māori of New Zealand generally consider Cook a hostile invader, and – during the celebration of the bicentenary of Cook's voyages – demanded an acknowledgement of the Māori that Cook's crew had killed.

Many Hawaiians condemn Cook's impact on their culture, and blame him for introducing STDs to their islands. Hawaiian scholar Haunani-Kay Trask described Cook as a "a syphilitic, tubercular racist", and criticised him for introducing capitalism and Christianity into Hawaii. The opinions of Hawaiians may have been influenced in the 1800s by American missionaries in Hawaii, who attempted to induce dislike of Britain by promulgating falsehoods about Cook, such as that he intentionally decimated the Hawaiians and wantonly fired ships' guns into crowds.

Many Aboriginal Australians view Cook negatively, viewing him as responsible for violence and subsequent colonisation. Cook is included in stories and legends even in parts of Australia far from where he landed. Efforts have been made at reconciliation, and the Cook memorial in Ship Cove now has an art installation that features an aboriginal artwork alongside Cook's monument. (Note: Anne Salmond has ntoed that the relations between Cook and the Maori at Anaura and Uawa were peaceful.) Anthropologist Chris Healy has analysed Aboriginal stories about Cook, and they invariably portray Cook as an outsider: confused, not of the land, unable to make a valid exchange, continually making transgressions.

Some Nuu-chah-nulth people in British Columbia view Cook as an invader who took provisions without compensating the local people.

Cook Islands, which became an independent nation in 1965, considered changing the name of their country, but ultimately decided to retain its current name.

Indigenous people have campaigned for the return of indigenous artefacts taken during Cook's voyages. (Note: An example of an artefact that has been the subject of requests for return is the Gweagal shield.) The art historian Alice Proctor argues that the controversies over public representations of Cook and the display of indigenous artefacts from his voyages are part of a broader debate over resistance to colonialist narratives and the decolonisation of museums and public spaces.

The period 2018 to 2021 marked the 250th anniversary of Cook's first voyage of exploration. Several countries, including Australia and New Zealand, arranged official events to commemorate the voyage, leading to widespread public debate about Cook's legacy and the violence associated with his contacts with indigenous peoples. In the lead-up to the commemorations, various memorials to Cook in Australia and New Zealand were vandalised, and there were public calls for their removal or modification due to their alleged promotion of colonialist narratives. Attacks on public monuments to Cook have occurred in Australia, New Zealand, Canada and Hawaii. Several academics also link the attacks on Cook statues to the Black Lives Matter movement.
