= Naylor =

Naylor may refer to:

== Places ==
- Naylor, Georgia, U.S.
- Naylor, Missouri, U.S.
- Naylor Road (Washington Metro), a transit station in Prince George's County, Maryland, U.S.

== Other ==
- Naylor Observatory, near Lewisberry, Pennsylvania, U.S.
- Naylor TF 1700, a car by defunct British manufacturer Naylor Cars
- Naylor (surname), an English surname
- Naylor Vickers & Co., a foundry
