= Caribou Lake (Temagami) =

Lake in Ontario, Canada

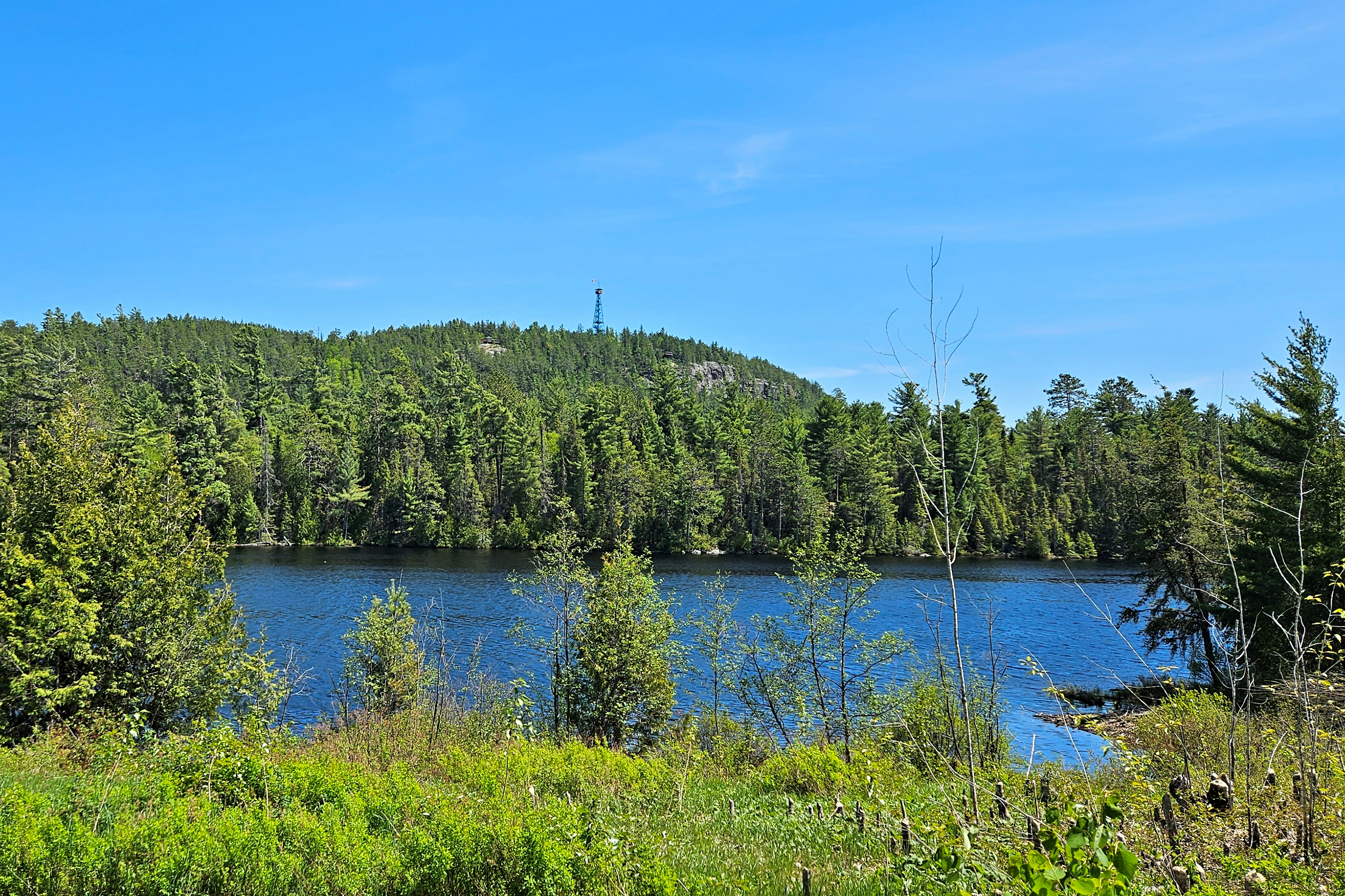
- Caribou Lake with Caribou Mountain in the background

- Location of Caribou Lake in Ontario
- Location: Temagami, Nipissing, Ontario
- Coordinates: 47°03′37″N 79°47′09″W
- Type: Lake
- Part of: Ottawa River drainage basin
- Max. length: 1.1 km (0.68 mi)
- Max. width: 0.4 km (0.25 mi)
- Surface elevation: 298 m (978 ft)

Caribou Lake is a lake in the Ottawa River drainage basin in Strathy Township of Temagami, Nipissing District in Northeastern Ontario, Canada. The municipality centre of Temagami is located on the north-northwestern shore of the lake.

The primary outflow is an unnamed creek to Snake Island Lake, which flows via Cassels Lake, Rabbit Lake, the Matabitchuan River and Lake Timiskaming into the Ottawa River.

Caribou Mountain, a large forested hill with a 30.4 m (100 ft) fire tower on its summit, rises above Caribou Lake with a topographical prominence of 122 m (400 ft).

== See also ==
- Lakes of Temagami
- Jumping Cariboo Lake
