= Owaissa Lake (Temagami) =

Lake in Ontario, Canada

- Location in Ontario
- Location: Nipissing District, Ontario
- Coordinates: 47°09′10″N 79°46′39″W
- Type: Lake
- Part of: Saint Lawrence River drainage basin
- Basin countries: Canada
- Max. length: 780 metres (2,560 ft)
- Max. width: 510 metres (1,670 ft)
- Surface elevation: 311 metres (1,020 ft)

Owaissa Lake is a lake in the municipality of Temagami, Nipissing District in Northeastern Ontario, Canada. It is in geographic Best Township and is part of the Saint Lawrence River drainage basin.

Owaissa Lake has two islands, one in the middle of the lake and on at the northeast. It has one unnamed inflow, at the northwest, and one unnamed outflow, at the northeast, which leads to Ferguson Lake on Net Creek. Net Creek flows via Cassels Lake, Rabbit Lake, the Matabitchuan River, Lake Timiskaming and the Ottawa River to the Saint Lawrence River.

== See also ==
- Lakes of Temagami
