= Net Creek =

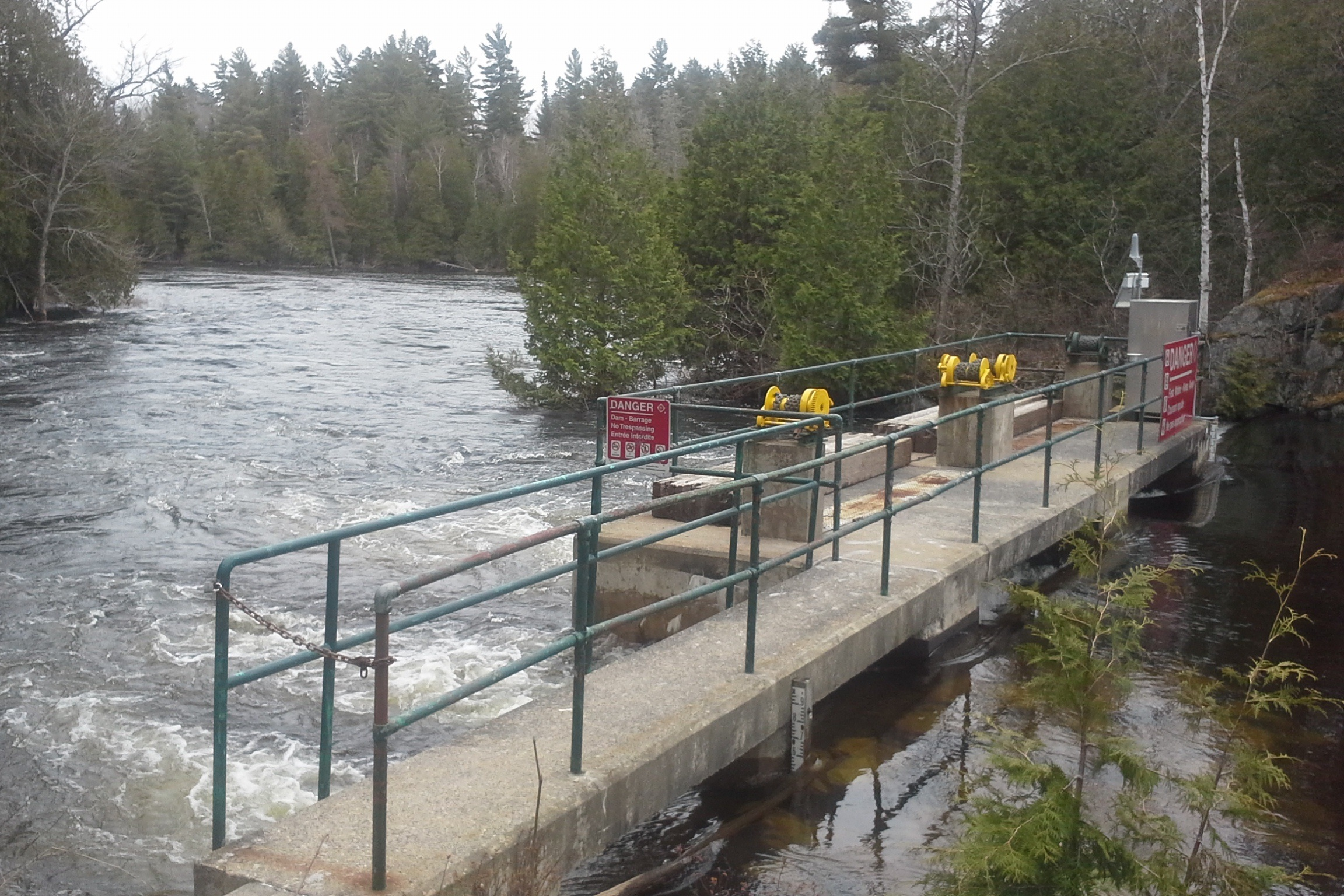
- Net Creek and dam

- Location of the mouth of Net Creek in Ontario

Location
- Country: Canada
- Province: Ontario
- Region: Northeastern Ontario
- District: Nipissing
- Municipality: Temagami

Physical characteristics
- Source: Rib Lake
  - location: Best Township
  - coordinates: 47°12′53″N 79°42′58″W
  - elevation: 300 m (980 ft)
- Mouth: Cassels Lake
  - location: Cassels Township
  - coordinates: 47°4′48″N 79°43′42″W
  - elevation: 300 m (980 ft)
- Length: 15 km (9.3 mi)

Basin features
- River system: Ottawa River drainage basin

Net Creek is a stream in Northeastern Ontario, Canada. It is located in Best, Strathy and Cassels townships of the municipality of Temagami. The creek flows through at least four lakes, namely Petraut Lake, Duncan Lake, Ferguson Lake and Net Lake.

== Course and hydrology ==
Net Creek begins from the south end of Rib Lake in Best Township. From there it flows about 3 km (1.9 mi) south into Petraut Lake. It then flows 1.50 km (0.93 mi) to the south-southwest into Duncan Lake where it runs another 0.67 km (0.42 mi) south-southwest into Ferguson Lake. At the south end of Ferguson Lake the creek then flows south-southwest 0.08 km (0.050 mi) into Net Lake. From the south end of Outlet Bay, Net Creek flows south-southeast into Cassels Lake. The creek has an approximate elevation of 300 m (980 ft) and has a length of about 15 km (9.3 mi).

Net Creek is part of the Ottawa River drainage basin, a large area covering much of eastern Ontario and western Quebec where water drains into the Ottawa River. After Net Creek flows into Cassels Lake, the water enters Rabbit Lake, which is drained by the Matabitchuan River. The Matabitchuan River then flows into Lake Timiskaming where the water eventually enters the Ottawa River.

Outflow of Net Lake into Net Creek is controlled by the 2.6 m (8.5 ft) high Net Creek Dam (47°05′05″N 79°43′58″W). The dam was originally built around the 1920s by the Temagami Timber Company but was rebuilt in 1974 with the purpose of controlling water levels in Net Lake.

== See also ==
- List of rivers of Ontario
