= Summit Lake (Timiskaming District) =

Lake in Timiskaming District, Ontario, Canada

- Location within Ontario
- Location: Timiskaming District, Ontario
- Coordinates: 47°16′25″N 79°45′44″W
- Primary outflows: Unnamed creek to Johnson Lake
- Basin countries: Canada
- Max. length: 0.43 km (0.27 mi)
- Max. width: 0.08 km (0.050 mi)
- Surface elevation: 324 m (1,063 ft)

Summit Lake is a lake in Timiskaming District, Ontario, Canada, about 7 kilometres (4 mi) southeast of the community of Latchford, and 250 metres (820 ft) north of the Johnson stop and settlement on the Ontario Northland Railway mainline, which runs along the entire east side of the lake. Highway 11 (Frontier Route) runs just west of the lake.

== Hydrology ==
Summit Lake is about 430 metres (1,411 ft) long and 80 metres (262 ft) wide, and lies at an elevation of 324 metres (1,063 ft). There are no inflows. The primary outflow is an unnamed creek, towards Johnson Lake, at the south end of the lake, which eventually flows via Rib Lake, Net Creek, Net Lake, Cassels Lake, Rabbit Lake, the Matabitchuan River, Lake Timiskaming, and the Ottawa River into the St. Lawrence River.
