= Ferguson Lake (Temagami) =

- Location in Ontario
- Location: Nipissing District, Ontario
- Coordinates: 47°08′21″N 79°45′46″W
- Type: Lake
- Part of: Saint Lawrence River drainage basin
- Basin countries: Canada
- Max. length: 680 metres (2,230 ft)
- Max. width: 480 metres (1,570 ft)
- Surface elevation: 293 metres (961 ft)

Ferguson Lake is a lake in the municipality of Temagami, Nipissing District in Northeastern Ontario, Canada. It is in geographic Strathy Township and is part of the Saint Lawrence River drainage basin.

Ferguson Lake has three inflows. The primary inflow is Net Creek at the northeast; there are two other unnamed inflows, one at the northwest, arriving from the direction of Owaissa Lake, and one at the west. The primary outflow is also Net Creek, which flows via Cassels Lake, Rabbit Lake, the Matabitchuan River, Lake Timiskaming and the Ottawa River to the Saint Lawrence River.

Ontario Highway 11 and the Ontario Northland Railway run along the western shore of Ferguson Lake.

== See also ==
- Lakes of Temagami
