= Rabbit Creek (Nipissing District) =

- Location of the mouth of Rabbit Creek in Ontario

Location
- Country: Canada
- Province: Ontario
- Region: Northeastern Ontario
- District: Nipissing
- Municipality: Temagami

Physical characteristics
- Source: Unnamed pond
  - coordinates: 46°56′58″N 79°46′53″W
  - elevation: 324 m (1,063 ft)
- Mouth: Rabbit Lake
  - coordinates: 46°55′40″N 79°41′18″W
  - elevation: 290 m (950 ft)

Basin features
- River system: Ottawa River drainage basin
- Tributaries
  - right: Angus Creek

Rabbit Creek is a stream in the municipality of Temagami, Nipissing District, Northeastern Ontario, Canada. It is in the Ottawa River drainage basin and originates from an unnamed pond north of Christy Lake in geographic Law Township. From there it flows north then turns east to North Milne Lake. It heads northeast under Highway 11 to an unnamed lake, passes into geographic Askin Township, reaches Hornet Lake and takes in the right tributary Angus Creek where it travels along the Ontario Northland Railway to its mouth at Rabbit Lake. Rabbit Lake flows via the Matabitchuan River and Lake Timiskaming to the Ottawa River.

A train derailment occurred along the Ontario Northland Railway at Mileage 63.4 on 14 March, 2000. The accident involved 17 cars that rolled down an embankment, two of which were leaking sulfuric acid. The possibility that some of the toxic acid made its way into Rabbit Creek prompted Ontario Northland to dump gravel into the creek as an attempt to constrain the flow of the acid.

== See also ==
- List of rivers of Ontario
