= Rib Lake (Ontario) =

Lake in northeastern Ontario, Canada

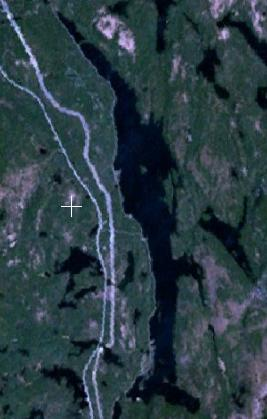
- Satellite image of Rib Lake (middle) and smaller adjacent lakes

- Location within Ontario
- Location: Latchford and Temagami, Ontario
- Coordinates: 47°12′53″N 79°42′58″W
- Part of: Ottawa River drainage basin
- Primary inflows: Ten unnamed creeks
- Primary outflows: Net Creek
- Basin countries: Canada
- Max. length: 10 km (6.2 mi)
- Max. width: 1.2 km (0.75 mi)
- Surface elevation: 313 m (1,027 ft)
- Islands: Babcock Island, Sans Souci Island
- Settlements: Freeman, Rib Lake

Location of Rib Lake in Ontario

Rib Lake is a long and narrow lake in the Town of Latchford and in the Municipality of Temagami in Northeastern Ontario, Canada, located about 9 kilometres (6 mi) southeast of the centre of the community of Latchford and 9 kilometres (6 mi) northeast of the community of Temagami North. The lake is in the Ottawa River drainage basin and is the main access for canoeists en route to Rib Mountain.

The lake was originally called Gitchiway-Pigigonaysing by the Teme-Augama Anishnabai, meaning Big Rib Lake.

== Geography ==
The lake is about 10 kilometres (6 mi) long north to south and 1.2 kilometres (0.7 mi) wide east to west. With the exception of the very southern tip, the lake is in the South Part of geographic Gillies Limit Township in Timiskaming District, today part of the town of Latchford; the southern tip is in geographic Best Township in Nipissing District, today part of the municipality of Temagami.

There are ten creek inflows: one at the north end of the lake from Johnson Lake; four on the east side, from an unnamed pond, Roosevelt Lake, Cliff Lake and an unnamed lake from north to south; one from unnamed lakes at Murphy's Bay at the southeast end; four on the west side, two from unnamed ponds, from Whitney Lake and an unnamed pond from north to south. The primary outflow is Net Creek, towards Petrault Lake, at the southwest corner of the lake, which eventually flows via Net Lake, Cassels Lake, Rabbit Lake, the Matabitchuan River, Lake Timiskaming, and the Ottawa River into the Saint Lawrence River.

== Transportation ==
The Ontario Northland Railway mainline runs along the entire west side of the lake; the stops/settlements of Freeman and Rib Lake are on west shore. Ontario Highway 11 (Frontier Route) and the TransCanada pipeline run just west of the lake.

== See also ==
- Lakes of Temagami
