= White Bear Forest =

Old growth forest in Temagami, Ontario, Canada

Coordinates: 47.05°N 79.76°W

The White Bear Forest is an old-growth forest, located in Temagami, Ontario, Canada. The forest is named after Chief White Bear, who was the last chief of the Teme-Augama Anishnabai before Europeans appeared in the region. In some parts of the White Bear Forest trees commonly reach 200 to 300 years in age, while the oldest tree accurately aged in White Bear Forest was a red pine that was 400 years old in 1999. The White Bear Forest contains one of Canada's oldest portages, dating back some 3,000 years. Today, more than 17 km (11 mi) of trails access the White Bear Forest. A trail guide is available online at http://ancientforest.org/whitebear.html.

The 396 m (1,299 ft) Caribou Mountain contains a renovated 30 m (98 ft) fire lookout tower that visitors can climb for a small fee.

== History ==
In 1928, the Gillies Bros. logging company logged about 500 square kilometres (190 sq mi) of the White Bear Forest surrounding Cassels Lake and Rabbit Lake. A log dam was constructed at the narrows connecting Cassels Lake and Rabbit Lake to float logs from the surrounding area out to the Ottawa River. The water level in numerous lakes in the Temagami area was increased numerous feet. The Gillies' Bros. logging company then cut the trees from the flooded forest area leaving behind the snags and stumps seen in the water. The area which we now call the White Bear Forest escaped the first wave of logging partly because the mill owner enjoyed the view of this forest, which was situated directly across the lake from the mill site. In 1992, the White Bear Forest was once again spared from logging because of local opposition, and is now promoted by the town of Temagami as a tourist attraction. In June 1996, the White Bear Forest was declared a Conservation Area by the Ministry of Natural Resources.

== Trails ==
The trails of the White Bear Forest offer hikers, canoeists and adventurers the opportunity to travel through a portion of Ontario's forest that has changed little over time. The majority of the trails are located in an area that has never been logged or mined. The trails vary, from a leisurely one-hour hike, to all day or weekend trips. Many species of birds and wildlife can be observed in their natural surroundings. There is at least seven named trails in the White Bear Forest.

Old Ranger Trail was formerly used by fire rangers to get from Caribou Lake Portage to the fire tower on top of Caribou Mountain. They would haul their canoes through the trail and pull themselves up Caribou Mountain using an old water hose. Remnants of this hose can still be found around Caribou Mountain. The trail is about 400 m (1,300 ft) long.

Another trail adjacent to the fire tower is the White Bear Trail. It is 3 km (1.9 mi) long, coming out on the Ontario Hydro line in the east and adjoining the Old Ranger Trail in the west.

Red Fox Trail is about 6.5 km (4.0 mi) long, crossing the Ontario Hydro line at two locations. At Pleasant Lake, the Red Fox Trail immediately goes into the old growth forest. The Red Fox Trail comes out at two locations; one at the Beaver Pond and the other at the end of the Caribou Trail at Pinque Lake.

To the west and southwest is the 2.8 km (1.7 mi) long Caribou Trail. It has at least three entrances; the Trans Canada Pipeline on O'Connor Drive, the Red Fox Trail and across from Finlayson Point on Highway 11. The trail extends along the shores of both Caribou Lake and Pingue Lake.

Peregrine Trail extends along the shores of Cassels Lake and through the heart of the White Bear Forest. It is about 5 km (3.1 mi) long and comes out at three locations; Cassels Lake, Pecours Bay of Snake Island Lake and the Red Fox Trail.

Otter Trail is 4.5 km (2.8 mi) in length, extending largely along Cassels Lake and Pecours Bay of Snake Island Lake.

Beaver Trail loops through the heart of the White Bear Forest. In contrast to most other White Bear Forest trails, the Beaver Trail contains rocky terrain and steep cliffs. Its two southern ends come out on the Peregrine Trail whereas its northern end comes out on the Otter Trail.

== See also ==
- List of old growth forests
