= Johnson Lake (disambiguation) =

Johnson Lake is a glacial lake in Elmore County, Idaho, United States.

Johnson Lake may also refer to:

== Lakes in the United States ==
=== Alaska ===
- Johnson Lake (Kenai Peninsula Borough, Alaska), in Kenai Peninsula Borough, Alaska
- Johnson Lake (Matanuska-Susitna Borough, Alaska), in Matanuska-Susitna Borough, Alaska

=== Arkansas ===
- Big Johnson Lake, in Calhoun County
- Johnson Lake (Crawford County, Arkansas), a reservoir in Crawford County
- Johnson Lake (Jackson County, Arkansas), in Jackson County
- Johnson Lake (Jefferson County, Arkansas), two lakes in Jefferson County
- Johnson Lake (Lee County, Arkansas), in Lee County
- Johnson Lake (Lonoke County, Arkansas), in Lonoke County

=== Idaho ===
- Johnson Lake, in Elmore County

=== Illinois ===
- Johnson Lake, in Johnson-Sauk Trail State Recreation Area, Henry County

=== Indiana ===
- Johnson Lake, in Otsego Township, Steuben County
- Johnson Lake, in Pleasant Township, Steuben County

=== Minnesota ===
- Johnson Lake, in Glen Township, Aitkin County, Minnesota
- Johnson Lake, in Hazelton Township, Aitkin County, Minnesota
- Johnson Lake, in Spencer Township, Aitkin County, Minnesota
- Johnson Lake, in Eagle View Township, Becker County, Minnesota
- Johnson Lake, in Lake View Township, Becker County, Minnesota
- Johnson Lake, in Round Lake Township, Becker County, Minnesota
- Johnson Lake, in White Earth Township, Becker County, Minnesota
- Johnson Lake, in San Francisco Township, Carver County, Minnesota
- Johnson Lake, in Becker Township, Cass County
- Johnson Lake, in Inguadona Township, Cass County
- Johnson Lake, in Powers Township, Cass County
- Johnson Lake, in Torrey Township, Cass County
- Johnson Lake, in Lake Elizabeth Township, Kandiyohi County, Minnesota

=== Montana ===
- Johnson Lake (Flathead County, Montana), in Flathead County
- Johnson Lake (Gallatin County, Montana), in Gallatin County
- Johnson Lake (Granite County, Montana), in Granite County
- Johnson Lake (Roosevelt County, Montana), in Roosevelt County
- Johnson Lake (Sheridan County, Montana), in Sheridan County
- Ruby Johnson Lake, in Toole County
- Johnson Lake, in the Anaconda-Pintler Wilderness

=== Nebraska ===
- Johnson Lake, a reservoir between Dawson County and Gosper County

=== Oklahoma ===
- Lake Jed Johnson, a reservoir in the Wichita Mountains

=== Oregon ===
- Johnson Lake, former name of Tenmile Lake (Oregon)

=== South Dakota ===
- Johnson Lake, South Dakota, in Oakwood Lakes State Park, Brookings County

=== Texas ===
- Lake Lyndon B. Johnson, a reservoir in the Texas Hill Country

=== Wisconsin ===
- Johnson Lake, in Bayfield County
- Johnson Lakes, two lakes in Burnett County
- Johnson Lake, in Oconto County
- Johnson Lake, in Oneida County
- Johnson Lake, in Polk County
- Johnson Lake, in Portage County
- Johnson Lake, in Price County
- Johnson Lakes, two lakes in Sawyer County
- Johnson Lakes, two lakes in Vilas County
- Johnson Lake, in Washburn County
- Johnson Lake, in Waupaca County

== Lakes in Canada ==
- Johnson Lake (Haliburton County), in Haliburton Forest, Haliburton County, Ontario
- Johnson Lake (Parry Sound District), in McMurrich/Monteith, Parry Sound District, Ontario
- Johnson Lake (Timiskaming District), part of the outflow of Summit Lake (Timiskaming District), Ontario
- Johnson Lake (Owl Creek, Kenora District), a tributary of Owl Creek in Kenora District, Ontario
- Johnson Lake (Thunder Bay District), in Thunder Bay District, Ontario
- Johnson Lake (Frontenac County), in Frontenac County, Ontario
- Johnson Lake (Sudbury District), in Sudbury District, Ontario
- Johnson Lake (Hastings County), in Hastings County, Ontario
- Johnson Lake (Pennefather Township, Algoma District), in Pennefather Township, Algoma District, Ontario
- Johnson Lake (Cochrane District), in Cochrane District, Ontario
- Johnson Lake (Larkin Township, Algoma District), in Larkin Township, Algoma District, Ontario
- Johnson Lake (Mulcahy Township, Kenora District), in Mulcahy Township, Kenora District, Ontario
- Johnson Lake, in Banff National Park, Alberta

== Other uses ==
- Johnson Lake Airport, an airport in Alberta, Canada
- Johnson Lake Mine Historic District, in Great Basin National Park, Nevada, United States
- Johnson Lake National Wildlife Refuge, North Dakota, United States
- Johnson Lake Shelters, a historic site in McIntosh County, Oklahoma, United States
- Johnson Lake State Recreation Area, a state park on the Kenai Peninsula, Alaska

== See also ==
- Lake Johnson, a glacial lake in the South Island of New Zealand
