= Gorrie Lake =

Lake in Ontario, Canada

- Location within Ontario
- Location: Timiskaming District, Ontario
- Coordinates: 47°07′21″N 79°32′39″W
- Primary inflows: Two unnamed creeks
- Primary outflows: Unnamed creek to Fourbass Lake
- Basin countries: Canada
- Max. length: 1.4 km (0.87 mi)
- Max. width: 0.7 km (0.43 mi)
- Surface elevation: 300 m (980 ft)

Gorrie Lake is a lake in Timiskaming District, Ontario, Canada, about 23 kilometres (14 mi) east of Temagami.

== Hydrology ==
The lake is about 1.4 kilometres (0.9 mi) long and 0.7 kilometres (0.4 mi) wide and lies at an elevation of 300 metres (984 ft). The primary inflows are two unnamed creeks on the western side. The primary outflow, at the eastern side, is an unnamed creek to Fourbass Lake, which flows via the Matabitchuan River into Lake Timiskaming, then via the Ottawa River into the St. Lawrence River.
