= Fourbass Lake (Ontario) =

Lake in Ontario, Canada

- Location within Ontario
- Location: Timiskaming District, Ontario
- Coordinates: 47°05′29″N 79°31′40″W
- Primary inflows: Matabitchuan River
- Primary outflows: Matabitchuan River
- Basin countries: Canada
- Max. length: 7.3 km (4.5 mi)
- Max. width: 4.3 km (2.7 mi)
- Surface elevation: 274 m (899 ft)

Fourbass Lake is a lake in Timiskaming District, Ontario, Canada, about 20 kilometres (12 mi) east of Temagami.

== Hydrology ==
The lake is about 7.3 kilometres (4.5 mi) long and 4.3 kilometres (2.7 mi) wide and lies at an elevation of 274 metres (899 ft). The primary inflow is the Matabitchuan River, from Rabbit Lake further upstream, at the southern tip. Other inflows are unnamed creeks from Cooper Lake at the east and Gorrie Lake at the west. The primary outflow is also the Matabitchuan River, at the northwest tip. A dam controls the outflow, and some of the water from the lake is diverted through penstocks from a point 47°07′17″N 79°29′54″W southeast of the river outflow to the Ontario Power Generation Matabitchuan Generating Station. Highway 567 leads from the community of North Cobalt (in Temiskaming Shores) to the generating station. The lake's waters flow via the Matabitchuan River into Lake Timiskaming, then via the Ottawa River into the St. Lawrence River.

== See also ==
- Timiskaming Dam-Bridge of Quebec Replacement Project, August 21, 2018
- Timiskaming Dam complex first phase opens
