= Angus Creek =

- Location of the mouth of Angus Creek in Ontario

Location
- Country: Canada
- Province: Ontario
- Region: Northeastern Ontario
- District: Nipissing
- Municipality: Temagami

Physical characteristics
- Source: Angus Lake
  - coordinates: 46°55′35″N 79°45′00″W
  - elevation: 314 m (1,030 ft)
- Mouth: Rabbit Creek
  - coordinates: 46°56′14″N 79°44′23″W
  - elevation: 303 m (994 ft)

Basin features
- River system: Ottawa River drainage basin

Angus Creek is a stream in the municipality of Temagami in Nipissing District, Northeastern Ontario, Canada. It is in the Ottawa River drainage basin and is a right tributary of Rabbit Creek.

== Course ==
The creek rises at Angus Lake in geographic Askin Township. It flows north-northeast under Highway 11 and continues north-northeast to a small unnamed pond. Angus Creek then flows east, takes in an unnamed right tributary, turns northeast to another small unnamed pond and heads east to its mouth at Rabbit Creek.

== See also ==
- List of rivers of Ontario
