= Poison Pond =

Small freshwater lake in Northeastern Ontario, Canada

- Location within Ontario
- Location: Temagami, Ontario
- Coordinates: 47°03′15.61″N 79°44′40.15″W
- Basin countries: Canada

Poison Pond is a small freshwater lake in the Temagami region of Northeastern Ontario, Canada, located near Pecours Bay of Snake Island Lake. Poison Pond is in the White Bear Forest and is typically approached from the Peregrine Trail, which adjoins the Red Fox Trail to the west. Its eastern portion adjoins the Otter Trail.

Poison Pond is the location of a few locally rare plants, including wild mint, striped maple, spikenard and water parsnip, which are not typically found in the White Bear Forest. It is also home to beavers and moose. The lake gets its name from the abundant poison ivy found along its shoreline.
