= Rib Mountain (Ontario) =

- Location within Ontario

Highest point
- Elevation: 520 m (1,710 ft)
- Coordinates: 47°12′27″N 79°40′06″W

Geography
- Location: Timiskaming District and Nipissing District, Ontario, Canada
- Topo map: NTS 31M4 Témagami

Rib Mountain is a mountain that straddles the border between the municipalities of Latchford, Timiskaming District and Temagami, Nipissing District in Northeastern Ontario, Canada. It divides Friday Lake on the east and Rib Lake on the west.
