= Rabbit Lake Occurrence =

- Location in Ontario
- Location: Temagami, Ontario, Canada; 46°57′22.7″N 79°40′19.2″W

The Rabbit Lake Occurrence is a mineral showing near the southeastern shore of Rabbit Lake in Northeastern Ontario, Canada. Situated in northeastern Askin Township, the occurrence contains primary cobalt, nickel and gold mineralization but silver is also present. It has a width of 46 cm (18 in) and is hosted by a fracture zone in conglomerate-greywacke of the Huronian Supergroup.

This ore deposit was of interest to geologists at the time of its discovery in the early 20th century as it showed that cobalt-nickel ores were present so far south of the Cobalt silver district. It was noted, however, that the Rabbit Lake rocks had been disturbed and are much more highly metamorphosed than are those in the vicinity of Cobalt.

Mineral exploration of the Rabbit Lake Occurrence has occurred sporadically since at least the mid 1950s. Sampling has returned assays of 22.53% arsenic, 8.76% cobalt, 6.56% nickel, $8.80/t gold and $1.10/t silver.
