= Priest Mine =

Mine in northeastern Ontario, Canada

- Location in Ontario
- Location: Temagami, Ontario, Canada; 46°51′57.02″N 79°57′57.49″W
- Products: Copper, gold, lead, silver

Priest Mine is an abandoned surface and underground mine in Northeastern Ontario, Canada. It is located about 19 km (12 mi) northwest of the hamlet of Marten River on an island in north-central Cross Lake. Dating back to the early 1900s, it is one of the oldest mines in the municipality of Temagami.

== History ==
The mine was discovered in 1907 when attention was focused there by the discovery of a quartz vein in rocks that closely resembled those in the town of Cobalt further north, which was undergoing a silver rush at the time. Development consisted of small open pits and sinking of a 23 m (75 ft) inclined shaft along the quartz vein. At least five small drifts were created off the shaft at the 9 m (30 ft), 15 m (49 ft) and 23 m (75 ft) levels. Small shipments of sulfide ore, containing copper and lead with some gold and silver values, were made to a smelter.

In 1955, Cross Lake Mining Company Limited dewatered the shaft for examination and four diamond drill holes were created from the surface. It was evident that good mineralization had been encountered in the shaft, judging from the lumps of high-grade ore found lying in the muck, consisting of copper and galena, and some was observed on the waste rock dump. Heavy mineralization of pyrite, chalcopyrite and galena was noted at two points at the bottom of the shaft. The richest collected sample assayed 5.03% copper, 2.39% lead, 0.03 oz (0.85 g) of gold and 2.26 oz (64 g) of silver across a 38 cm (15 in) mining width.

== See also ==
- List of mines in Temagami
