= Owaissa =

Owaissa may refer to:

- USS Owaissa (SP-659), a United States Navy patrol vessel
- Owaissa, Temagami, an area in the municipality of Temagami, Ontario, Canada
