= Marten River Provincial Park =

Provincial park in Ontario, Canada

- IUCN category II (national park)
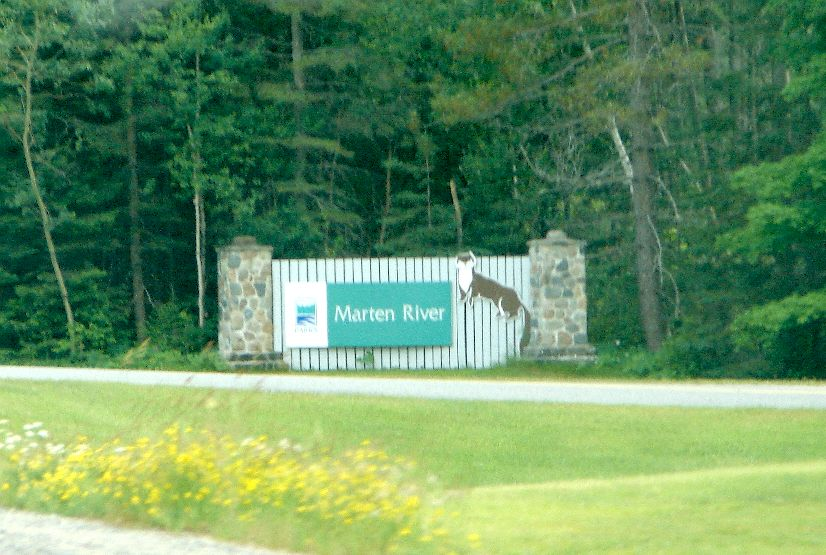
- Entrance to the park

- Location within Ontario
- Interactive map of Marten River Provincial Park
- Location: Nipissing District, Ontario, Canada
- Nearest city: Marten River, Ontario
- Coordinates: 46°43′24.84″N 79°48′52.23″W
- Area: 400 ha (990 acres)
- Established: 1960
- Visitors: 44,647 (in 2022)
- Governing body: Ontario Parks
- Website: www.ontarioparks.ca/park/martenriver

Marten River Provincial Park is a 400-hectare (990-acre) provincial park in Northeastern Ontario, Canada. It is located by the hamlet of Marten River in the municipality of Temagami.

== Background ==
Marten River Provincial Park features 193 campsites (105 of which have electrical hookups) in two campgrounds, Chicot (Sites 1–114) and Assinika (Sites 115–216). The park's feature attraction is a replica of a turn of the century logging camp, complete with a museum, camp buildings and outdoor displays of period logging equipment.
