= Snake Island Lake =

- Location of Snake Island Lake in Ontario.
- Location: Nipissing, Ontario, Canada
- Coordinates: 47°03′51″N 79°45′42″W
- Type: Lake
- Part of: Ottawa River drainage basin
- Max. length: 2.8 km (1.7 mi)
- Max. width: 0.4 km (0.25 mi)
- Surface elevation: 288 m (945 ft)

Snake Island Lake is a lake in the Ottawa River drainage basin in Strathy Township, Municipality of Temagami, Nipissing District of Northeastern Ontario, Canada.

The primary outflow is a navigable channel to Cassels Lake, which flows via Rabbit Lake, the Matabitchuan River and Lake Timiskaming into the Ottawa River.

== See also ==
- Lakes of Temagami
