= Northland Pyrite Mine =

Mine in Ontario, Canada

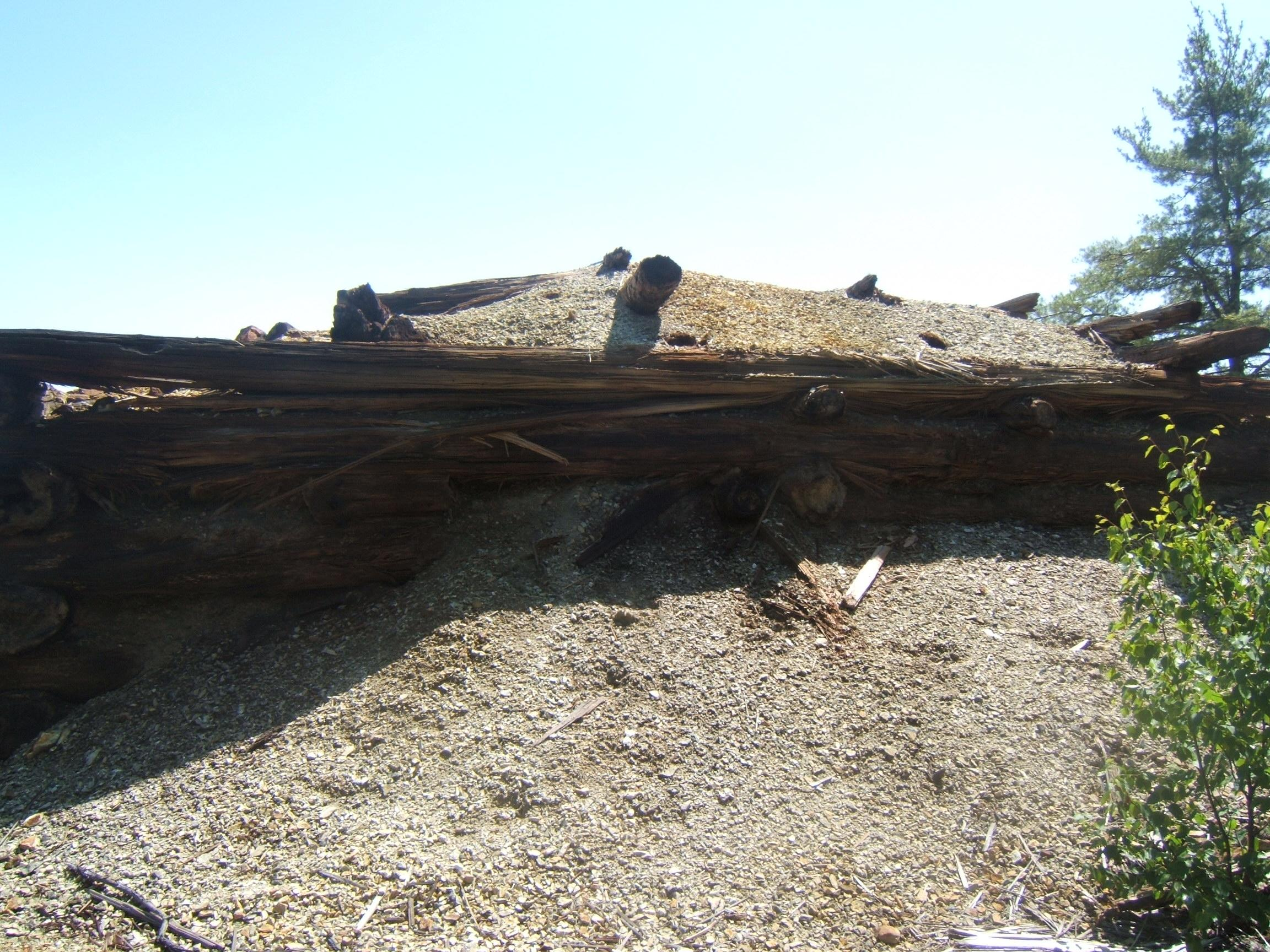
- The loading dock at the southern end of the Northland Pyrite Mine site

- Location in Ontario
- Location: Temagami, Ontario, Canada; 47°17′N 80°02′W
- Products: Chalcopyrite, pyrite, pyrrhotite
- Production: 76,067,050 pounds
- Opened: 1906
- Closed: 1911
- Company: Boland Lake Resources

The Northland Pyrite Mine, also known as James Lake Mine, Rib Lake Mine, Harris Mine or simply Northland Mine, is an abandoned underground mine in Northeastern Ontario, Canada, located on the southwestern shore of James Lake in Best Township of Temagami. It was operated by the Northland Mining Company during the early 1900s with the construction of a 91 m (299 ft) shaft and many open-cuts north of the shaft. Minerals present at the mine include chalcopyrite, pyrite and pyrrhotite, deposited in Precambrian volcanic rock of the Canadian Shield.

== History ==
Before the operation of Northland Pyrite Mine in the early 1900s, water levels of James Lake increased and decreased. The cause of this alternation could have been caused by beavers building dams in the lake's outlet, eventually causing the water levels to rise. This rise in water levels began to cease in 1906 when operations of the Northland Pyrite Mine began to dump volcanic waste rock along the southwestern shore of James Lake. This began with the construction of the 91 m (299 ft) shaft and the several open-cuts north of the shaft, but the mine site was originally discovered in 1903. Erosion of the volcanic waste rock resulted in the development of acidic lake wastewaters next to the waste pile, causing organisms around the mine to disappear. The name Harris Mine was coined for Northland Pyrite Mine by E.L. Fraleck in 1907 when Northland was actively operating for a year.

From February 1906 to March 1911, the Northland Pyrite Mine was in nearly continuous production. According to a former report from the Ontario Northland Railway, 76,067,050 pounds were sent throughout this epoch and was shipped to the town of Cobalt further north. A.A. Cole, who was the former manager of the former Temiskaming Testing Laboratories facility in Cobalt, stated the closure of Northland was due to the mine transporting pyrrhotite instead of pyrite for three days. The mined pyrrhotite was said to be in a parallel lens to the mined pyrite and its quality was unnoticed. During mine closer in March 1911, the 91 m (299 ft) shaft was filled in with logs and waste rock and the adjacent waters of James Lake has since flooded the mine to create more acidic lake wastewater. Colours of the wastewater range from orange to dark red in the central portion of the mine site and green in a narrow open-cut at the southern end of the mine site just west of the mine shaft.

== Geology ==
The Northland Pyrite Mine lies in a pyrite-bearing zone associated with a band of Keewatin bedded tuffs. This is the only major pyrite zone in the James Lake area and the Northland Pyrite Mine is the only past producer in the area, with no operating mines present. Cobalt-silver, molybdenum, platinum, nickel, gold and copper exist in the zone.

== See also ==
- List of mines in Temagami
