= Finlayson Point Provincial Park =

Provincial park in Ontario, Canada

- IUCN category II (national park)
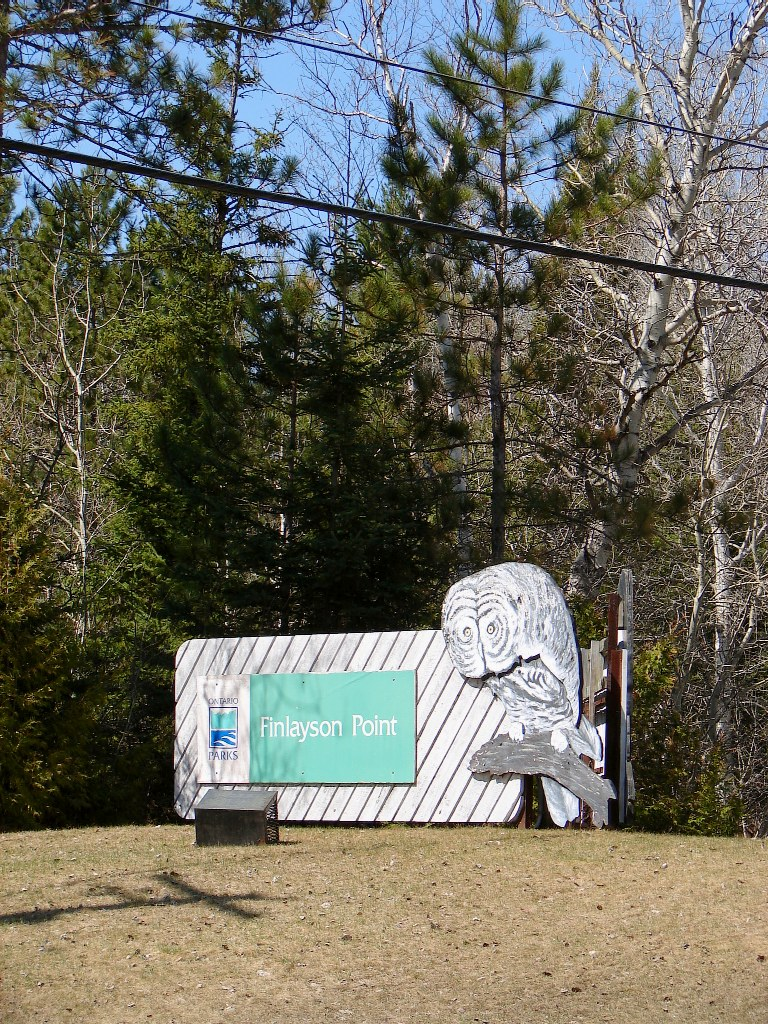
- Park entrance and artwork

- Location within Ontario
- Interactive map of Finlayson Point Provincial Park
- Location: Nipissing District, Ontario, Canada
- Nearest city: Temagami
- Coordinates: 47°03′19″N 79°48′17″W
- Area: 37 hectares (91 acres)
- Established: 1963
- Visitors: 23,226 (in 2022)
- Governing body: Ontario Parks
- Website: https://www.ontarioparks.ca/park/finlaysonpoint

Finlayson Point Provincial Park is a provincial park in Temagami, northeastern Ontario, Canada, just west of Ontario Highway 11. It offers access to Lake Temagami and the Lady Evelyn-Smoothwater Provincial Park. There is a plaque in the park honouring English naturalist Grey Owl.
