= Red Squirrel Road =

Logging road in Ontario, Canada

- Red Squirrel logging road, Johns-Manville Road

Route information
- Existed: 1965–present

Major junctions
- West end: Whitefish Bay on Lake Temagami
- East end: Ontario Highway 11 at Owaissa

Location
- Country: Canada
- Province: Ontario

Highway system
- Roads in Ontario

Red Squirrel Road, also called the Red Squirrel logging road and formerly called the Johns-Manville Road, is a logging road located within the Municipality of Temagami, Nipissing District in Northeastern Ontario, Canada. It runs from Whitefish Bay on Lake Temagami to Ontario Highway 11 at the community of Owaissa.

== History ==
Red Squirrel Road was originally created in 1965 by the Johns-Manville company to log jack pine on the sand flats just north of Ferguson Bay at the northern end of Lake Temagami. As the flats were cleared the logged jack pine was towed down Red Squirrel Road towards Highway 11. During 1970, Red Squirrel Road became longer to log the jack pine through the Sharp Rock Portage near Diamond Lake. Red Squirrel Road became abandoned to the public until around 1972 and subsequently, the road has been used by the public. In 1985, plans were broadcast to expand Red Squirrel Road and this became a rallying point for environmental preservation. In 1988, the Ontario Minister of Natural Resources, Vince Kerrio approved the expansion of the Red Squirrel logging road, directly through Anishnabe territory. This prompted a series of roadblocks by the Teme-Augama Anishnabai and by environmentalists from 1988 to 1989.
