= Rib Lake, Ontario =

Rib Lake
- Location in Ontario
- Coordinates: 47°11′19″N 79°42′57″W
- Country: Canada
- Province: Ontario
- District: Nipissing
- Geographic Township: Gillies Limit
- Elevation: 318 m (1,043 ft)
- Time zone: UTC-5 (Eastern Time Zone)
  - Summer (DST): UTC-4 (Eastern Time Zone)

Rib Lake is an unincorporated place and railway point in the town of Latchford, Timiskaming District, Northeastern Ontario, Canada. It is in geographic Gillies Limit Township and is located on the west shore of Rib Lake along the Ontario Northland Railway. Rib Lake was the location of a train station in the 1940s.
