= Owaissa, Temagami =

Owaissa
- Location in Ontario
- Coordinates: 47°08′16″N 79°46′10″W
- Country: Canada
- Province: Ontario
- District: Nipissing
- Geographic Township: Strathy
- Elevation: 309 m (1,014 ft)
- Time zone: UTC-5 (Eastern Time Zone)
  - Summer (DST): UTC-4 (Eastern Time Zone)

Owaissa is an unincorporated place and railway point in the municipality of Temagami, Nipissing District, in Northeastern Ontario, Canada. It is in geographic Strathy Township, and is located on Ontario Highway 11, on the Ontario Northland Railway, and on the northern arm of Net Lake, about 3 km (1.9 mi) north of

Owaissa is the locality of the historic Owaissa Sawmill. In 1954, an Ontario Northland Railway passing track was constructed at Mileage 86, making the short passing track at Owaissa redundant. This was during a time when passing tracks were being extended along the Ontario Northland Railway to make allowance for the greatly increased length of trains under diesel operation.

Owaissa Lake to the northwest is named after Owaissa.

The eastern terminus of Red Squirrel Road is at Ontario Highway 11 in Owaissa.
