= High Rock (Ontario) =

- Location within Ontario

Highest point
- Elevation: 371 m (1,217 ft)
- Coordinates: 46°55′12″N 80°02′39″W"High Rock Island". Geographical Names Data Base. Natural Resources Canada.

Geography
- Location: Lake Temagami
- Parent range: Canadian Shield, unnamed range
- Topo map: NTS 41I16 Lake Temagami

High Rock is a hill in Nipissing District of Northeastern Ontario, Canada, located 24 km (15 mi) southwest of the village of Temagami. The highest point on High Rock Island, it is one of many scenic viewpoints on Lake Temagami.

The lookout at the north end of High Rock Island is a Nipissing diabase dyke.

High Rock, along with Devil Mountain and Maple Mountain, is considered sacred to the Teme Augama Anishinabek. The path and the top of High Rock have human-made depressions and rock piles that were used for defensive purposes. The lookout at the top was used as a watch tower by the ancestors of the Teme Augama Anishinabek to detect if Iroquois were coming from the north or the south.

During the 1904 survey of Lake Temagami, it was determined that lots on High Rock Island (Island 312) were not to made available to cottagers until the timber on the island was harvested. The 1930s creation of the Skyline Reserve meant that trees within 90 meters of shore would not be cut, so commercial logging never occurred on the island. At some point, a few cottages were built on the island.
