= Best Township, Ontario =

Best
- Geographic township
- Location of Best Township in Ontario
- Coordinates: 47°11′26″N 79°46′02″W
- Country: Canada
- Province: Ontario
- Region: Northeastern Ontario
- District: Nipissing
- Municipality: Temagami
- Elevation: 336 m (1,102 ft)
- Time zone: UTC-5 (Eastern Time Zone)
  - Summer (DST): UTC-4 (Eastern Time Zone)
- Area codes: 705, 249

Best Township is a geographic township comprising a portion of the municipality of Temagami in Nipissing District, Northeastern Ontario, Canada. It is used for geographic purposes, such as land surveying and natural resource explorations. Neighbouring geographic townships include Gillies Limited Township to the north, Banting Township to the west, Chambers Township to the southwest, and Strathy and Cassels townships to the south.

== Localities ==
- Rib Lake
- James Lake
- Northland Pyrite Mine
