= Captains of the Clouds =

1942 film by Michael Curtiz

- Film poster
- Directed by: Michael Curtiz
- Screenplay by: Arthur T. Horman, Richard Macaulay, Norman Reilly Raine
- Story by: Arthur T. Horman; Roland Gillett
- Produced by: Hal B. Wallis (executive producer); William Cagney (associate producer)
- Starring: James Cagney; Dennis Morgan; Brenda Marshall; Alan Hale; George Tobias; Reginald Gardiner; Reginald Denny
- Cinematography: Sol Polito; Wilfrid M. Cline
- Edited by: George Amy
- Music by: Max Steiner (score); Harold Arlen; Johnny Mercer (title song)
- Color process: Technicolor
- Distributed by: Warner Bros. Pictures
- Release dates: February 12, 1942 (New York City); February 21, 1942 (U.S.)
- Running time: 114 minutes
- Country: United States
- Language: English
- Budget: $1.77 million
- Box office: $3.4 million

Captains of the Clouds (a.k.a. Shadows of Their Wings) is a 1942 American war film in Technicolor, directed by Michael Curtiz and starring James Cagney. It was produced by William Cagney (Cagney's brother), with Hal B. Wallis as executive producer. The screenplay was written by Arthur T. Horman, Richard Macaulay, and Norman Reilly Raine, based on a story by Horman and Roland Gillett. The cinematography was by Wilfred M. Cline and Sol Polito and was notable in that it was the first feature-length Hollywood production filmed entirely in Canada.

The film stars James Cagney and Dennis Morgan as Canadian pilots who do their part in the Second World War, and features Brenda Marshall, Alan Hale Sr., George Tobias, Reginald Gardiner, and Reginald Denny in supporting roles. The title of the film came from a phrase used by Billy Bishop, the First World War fighter ace, who played himself in the film. The same words are also echoed in the narration of The Lion Has Wings documentary (1939).

A film on the ongoing Canadian involvement made sense for the American war effort. The film ends with an epilogue chronicling the contributions of the Royal Canadian Air Force (RCAF) to the making of the film.

== Text in opening credits ==
"This picture is respectfully dedicated to the Royal Canadian Air Force....
With sincere appreciation of their cooperation and admiration for their abilities and courage...
To those student pilots in this picture who are now in actual combat overseas....
And most particularly is dedicated to the many in the Service who have trailed the shadows of their wings over the vastness of Canada from the forty-ninth parallel to the Arctic Circle....
The Bush Pilots"

== Plot ==
Brian MacLean irritates fellow bush pilots Johnny Dutton, Tiny Murphy, Blimp Lebec, and British expatriate Scrounger Harris by outcompeting them for business in rugged Northern Ontario, Canada. In 1939, as the Second World War is beginning. Dutton, whose ambition is to start his own airline, flies by the book, but MacLean is a seat-of-the-pants kind of pilot, mirroring the differences in their personalities.

MacLean nearly dies after he falls off one of his plane's pontoons and strikes his head as he attempts to tie his plane to the dock. Dutton flies a doctor in to perform emergency surgery and makes a difficult night landing in heavy cloud cover. MacLean is grateful and joins Dutton in a temporary partnership to help Dutton earn the seed fund for his airline. When Dutton rejects MacLean's warning about his girlfriend Emily Foster, MacLean marries her in order to save Dutton from wrecking his life. Dutton, however, does not know this and abruptly ends their friendship. Dutton impulsively gives his savings to charity and enlists in the Royal Canadian Air Force.

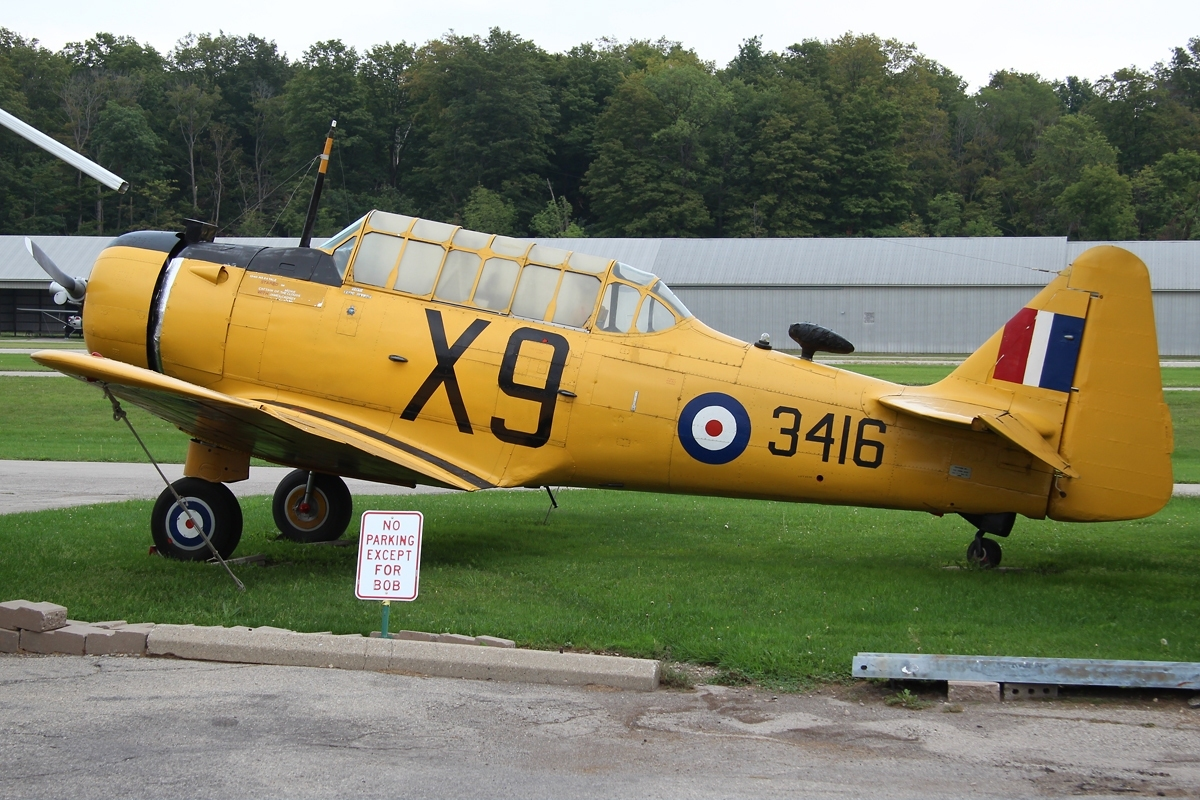
The NA-64 Yale flown by Cagney's character

Among the bush planes that were featured in the production was the Noorduyn Norseman seen touching down, and the Fairchild 71C above it

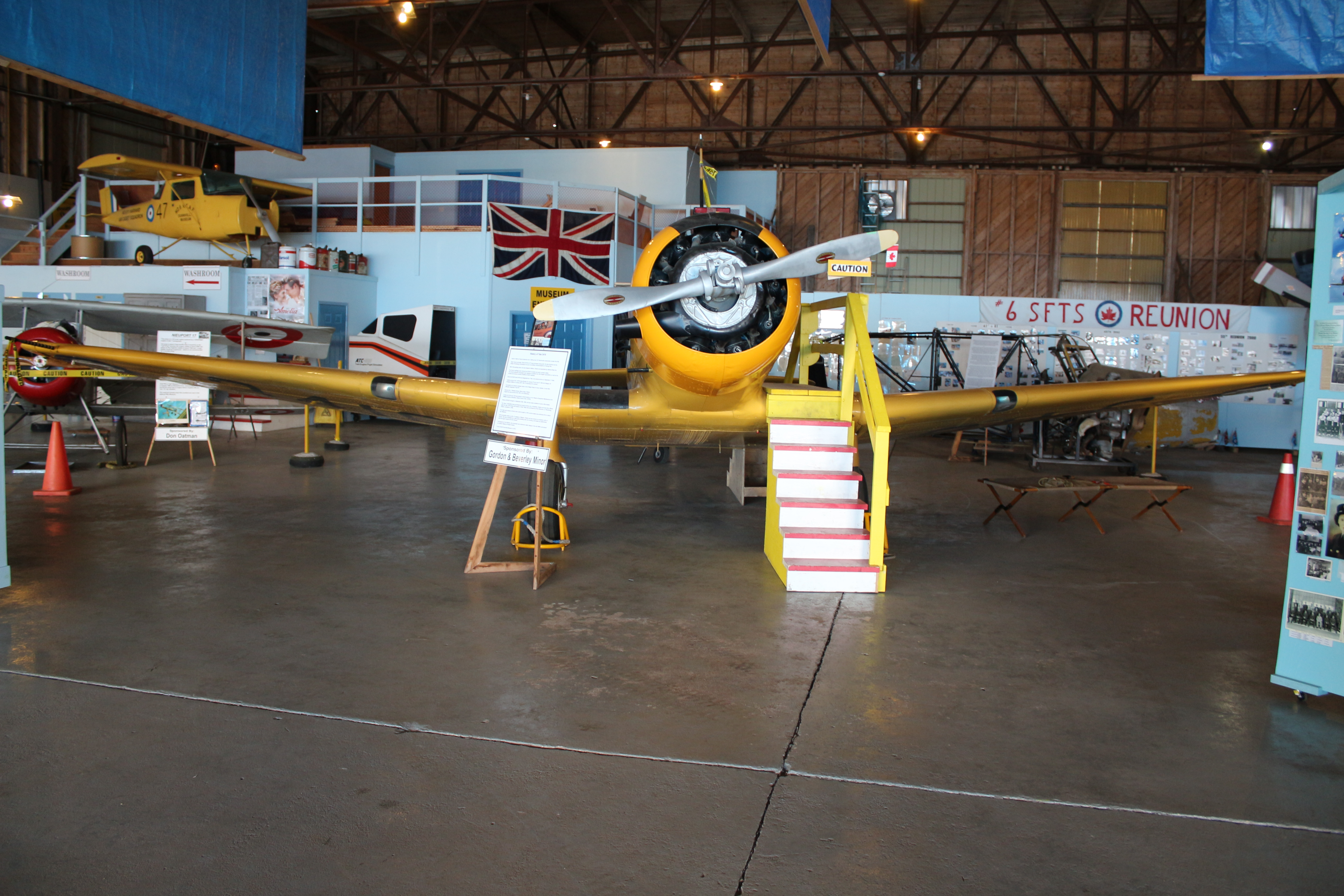
Yale aircraft used by Cagney's character. Located in the Air Museum outside of Dunnville, Ontario, Canada.

Later, after hearing Winston Churchill's "We shall fight on the beaches" speech on the radio, MacLean and the other bush pilots enlist in the Royal Canadian Air Force, only to discover that they are considered too old for combat. They reluctantly agree to train as flight instructors for the British Commonwealth Air Training Plan. Their commanding officer is none other than Dutton. MacLean, with his brash and fiercely independent nature, clashes with the military way of doing things, and he is court-martialed and dismissed from the service for flying too low, resulting in a cadet being severely injured. For revenge, he and "Tiny" buzz the airfield when renowned Canadian First World War ace Air Marshal William "Billy" Bishop (playing himself) is speaking during the group's graduation ceremony. "Tiny" blacks out while pulling out of a dive, and his plane plummets into the ground, killing him. MacLean loses his pilot's license as a result.

Later, when two transport aircraft crash, killing all 44 ferry pilots aboard, there is an urgent need for pilots to ferry a group of unarmed Lockheed Hudson bombers from Gander to Britain. The flight instructors are assigned the task, but their numbers have to be supplemented with civilian pilots. MacLean uses "Tiny" Murphy's papers to participate. Dutton recognizes him, but as Emily has told him why MacLean married (and abandoned) her, they reconcile and Dutton permits him to fly.

Dutton commands a flight of five. Nearing the coast of the British Isles, they are attacked by a German Messerschmitt Bf 109 fighter. First, Blimp Lebec is shot down. Then after Scrounger, MacLean's navigator, is killed, MacLean uses his flying skills to crash his unwieldy bomber into the nimble fighter, sacrificing himself to save the others.

== Cast ==
Actor	Role
James Cagney	Brian MacLean
Dennis Morgan	Johnny Dutton
Brenda Marshall	Emily Foster
Alan Hale	Tiny Murphy
George Tobias	Blimp Lebec
Reginald Gardiner	Scrounger Harris
Air Marshal W. A. Bishop	Himself
Reginald Denny	Commanding Officer
Russell Arms	Prentiss
Paul Cavanagh	Group Captain
Clem Bevans	Store-Teeth Morrison
J. M. Kerrigan	Foster
J. Farrell MacDonald	Dr. Neville
Patrick O'Moore	Fyffe
Morton Lowry	Carmichael
S/L O. Cathcart-Jones	Chief Flying Instructor
Frederic Worlock	President of Court-Martial
Roland Drew	Officer
Lucia Carroll	Blonde
George Meeker	Playboy
Benny Baker	Popcorn Kearns
Hardie Albright	Kingsley
Ray Walker	Mason
Charles Halton	Nolan
Louis Jean Heydt	Provost Marshal
Byron Barr; Michael Ames	Student Pilots
Willie Fung	Willie
Carl Harbord	Blake
Miles Mander	Churchill's voice (uncredited)

== Text in end credits ==
"Sincere appreciation is expressed to Major the Honourable C. G. Power, P.C., M.C., Minister of National Defence for Air (Canada) and to Air Marshal L. S. Breadner, D.S.C., Chief of the Air Staff, Royal Canadian Air Force, without whose authority and generous co-operation this picture could not have been brought to its splendid conclusion.
We also wish to express our thanks to Air Marshal Bishop, V.C., and the other officers and men of the R.C.A.F. who, in the making of this picture, are portrayed in the actual performance of their regular duties."

== Production ==
During pre-production, Joseph W. G. Clark, the public relations director of the British Commonwealth Air Training Plan, was heavily involved in promoting a film project that was initially identified as "Bush Pilots" based on a script submitted by Canadian screenwriters. With RCAF backing, Hal Wallis and Jack L. Warner were approached in Hollywood to undertake a "patriotic film." Warner was enthusiastic, and began the task of casting a major star to front the project. After considering Raymond Massey, Errol Flynn, and Clark Gable, the decision was made to cast George Brent, but Warner Bros. was unsure whether he could carry the film.

Numerous attempts to rewrite the script into a more acceptable form resulted in a final screenplay now titled "Captains of the Clouds". The name was borrowed from a Victory Loans speech given by Billy Bishop. The only holdup was casting, which was resolved when Warner persuaded its resident "cocky guy" (as producer Jerry Wald had dubbed him), 42-year-old James Cagney, to take on the lead male role.

This film was Cagney's first in Technicolor. His participation in the production has been characterized as reluctant, and he accepted only after his brother was taken on as an associate producer. He quipped, "I didn't like this story the last four times I did it and I don't like it now!" and feared that he was immersed in one of his trademark Warner Bros. "potboilers", playing a role he had reprised numerous times. However, in certain scenes, Cagney improvised. His loose interpretation is evident in a cabin scene when he is playing against his cronies. Cagney veers off the script, reverting to the cocky persona he had cultivated in countless earlier features.

Captains of the Clouds was produced with the full cooperation of the Royal Canadian Air Force to promote enlistment in the British Commonwealth Air Training Plan. (It was also intended as a rousing "war preparedness" film for American audiences, but by the time it was released, the U.S. was already at war; nevertheless it did serve as a showcase of the Canadian war effort.) The Warner Bros. principal cast and production crew of over 80 technicians, along with "half a million dollars of colour cinematography equipment," came from Hollywood, crossing into Canada on July 12, 1941. The film was shot from mid-July to mid-October 1941. Scenes filmed in Ottawa include several views of the historic Chateau Laurier hotel, Parliament, the former Ottawa Union Station and the Cenotaph area.

Much of the early footage involved a number of bush planes at the Woodcliff Camp on Trout Lake in North Bay, Ontario, and nearby Camp Caribou on Jumping Cariboo Lake in Marten River, Ontario. The aerial sequences were under the direction of Paul Mantz, a long-time Hollywood stunt pilot, who used a Stinson Model A trimotor camera ship. MacLean's aircraft, CF-HGO on-screen, was a Noorduyn Norseman flown by veteran stunt pilot Frank Clarke (who doubled for James Cagney in flying scenes), Johnny Dutton's silver CF-NBP was an actual Fairchild 71C bush plane, (Note: The actual registration number, CF-ATZ, can be clearly seen under the fictitious registration on the right wing's upper surface.) while Laurentian Air Service's Waco EGC-7 and AGC-8 cabin aircraft provided the other float planes. In addition, there was a Waco CJC, registered as CF-AVW (transformed into CF-JPY in the movie), which belonged to Albert Racicot, a Montreal-based plane dealer and aviation mechanics who, at the time, was also one of the several instructors hired by the Canadian government to train military pilots involved in World War II.

Principal photography did not go well; a number of incidents slowed production. One of the huskies that was key to a scene bit Morgan, opening up a gash on his hand. Cagney, in an uncharacteristic move, decided to forgo a stunt double and play the scene himself in which his character is struck by a whirling propeller. At first things proceeded smoothly, but when it came time for him to fall into the lake, he overdid it and suffered a real concussion, putting the 10-day shoot at North Bay, Ontario farther behind schedule. Weather was a constant challenge, and with the need to ensure continuity, small scenes became unnecessarily complex; as a result, a typical shooting day lasted almost into the night. One 30-second scene with all the principals running along the dock took an entire day to complete, with Cagney, Hale, and Tobias barely able to stand at the end of filming. With a Hollywood production in their midst, North Bay residents became such a persistent nuisance that the crew reverted to sending messages out of the location site by homing pigeons. (Note: Even though it seems unlikely, the secluded location and lack of telephones necessitated the use of homing pigeons obtained locally to send out messages to the other film units.)

The military background sequences were shot at RCAF Air Stations at Uplands, Trenton, Dartmouth, Jarvis, and Mountain View. The "Wings Parade" (officially the "Presentation of Wings Ceremony") filmed at the No. 2 Service Training School at RCAF Uplands was an actual graduation service for 110 RCAF cadets. It proved to be the most complex scene of the film. Over 100 Harvard training aircraft flew overhead in a salute to the graduates.

The climactic ferry mission was staged out over the Atlantic from RCAF Station Dartmouth using the base's operational Lockheed Hudson bombers, along with a repainted Hawker Hurricane that posed as the German Bf 109. (Note: Hawker Hurricanes were based at RCAF Dartmouth to provide fighter cover for convoys.) Due to the prominent Luftwaffe markings on the RCAF fighter, special alerts had to be posted in order to prevent "trigger-happy" home defence gunners from firing at it.

== Reception ==
Released in an era of patriotic films with overt propaganda themes, Captains of the Clouds received an enthusiastic public acceptance. Although it was a "Hollywood" production, the film premiered simultaneously on February 21, 1942, in New York, London, Ottawa, Cairo, Melbourne, Toronto, Winnipeg, and Vancouver, with RCAF pilots transporting film copies to all these cities. The public reaction can be partly attributed to the plot line that revolved around the unique Canadian wilderness and the bush pilot mystique. "So Full of Spectacle and Glory it Had to be Made in Technicolor!" was the ad copy that was used. The vivid aerial scenes filmed in Technicolor were another aspect of the expensive production that garnered critical attention. (Note: However, major portions of the film were not shot using Technicolor's cumbersome Three-Strip system but were instead shot using Technicolor's single-strip color system, which was actually an adaptation of Eastman Kodak's Kodachrome Commercial system, a special low-contrast film, but it was intended for three-color photography with 35mm release prints while employing conventional 35mm cameras and crews, not Technicolor cameras and crews. Disney would later employ Kodachrome Commercial for his "True Life Adventure" series, but 16mm in the Disney case; Kodak was then forbidden from making 35mm single-strip color films for its customers, just as Technicolor was forbidden from making 16mm single-strip color films for its customers, and so prohibition meant that Technicolor had to make 16mm prints on a 35mm base and then reperforate, slit and discard more than 50 percent of that product.) Reviews were mixed; while some critics felt the film suffered from a stagey plot and a forced romantic story line, the aerial scenes were considered the film's redeeming feature.

A “special preview” was given in Philadelphia's Earle Theatre on 15 February 1942, which proceeds going to the Philadelphia Inquirer's 'Build-a-Bomber' fund. The film began regular exhibition in Philadelphia on 18 February, at the city's Stanley Theatre.

The Chicago Tribune wrote: “a fine and inspiring movie….one of the most engrossing and comprehensive representations of a group that has ever been screened. The film is in Technicolor—gorgeous!....for detail, stirring humorous, tragic, you must see the picture….Direction was brilliant and you’ll not soon forget the flying field sequences."

According to Warner Bros. figures, the film earned $2,116,000 domestically and $1,312,000 in foreign markets.

== Oscar nominations ==
Ted Smith and Casey Roberts were nominated for Best Art Direction- Interior Decoration, Color, and Sol Polito was nominated for Best Color Cinematography (Note: Polito was initially denied entry into Canada because he was an Italian citizen.) at the 1943 Academy Awards.

== Music ==
The music score is by Max Steiner, and Harold Arlen wrote the title song (lyrics by Johnny Mercer), which is used as a march in the film. Later, "Captains of the Clouds" was adopted as an official song of the Royal Canadian Air Force, although its subsequent use has become largely ceremonial. The tune is also known for its use in Carl Stalling's music scores for various Warner Bros. Cartoons shorts.

Canada's unofficial national anthem, "The Maple Leaf Forever", by Alexander Muir, is also heard, as well as "O Canada", the de facto Canadian anthem since 1939, and official anthem since 1980.

=== Recording ===
The title song was the B side of a 1942 recording (Decca 4174) by Dick Powell, with Over There as the A side.

== Aircraft disposition ==
Three of the aircraft used in the flying sequences survive: the wreckage of the Noorduyn Norseman is on display in the Canadian Bushplane Heritage Centre, Sault Ste. Marie, Ontario, Canada; the Fairchild 71 is now displayed in the Alberta Aviation Museum, Edmonton, Alberta, Canada; and the North American NA-64 Yale is in the No.6 RCAF Dunnville Museum, Dunnville, Ontario, Canada.

== Radio Adaptation ==
On 2 February 1942—ahead of the film's release—NBC presented a radio adaptation on its Cavalcade of America program, with Cagney among the cast members.
