= James Lake (Ontario) =

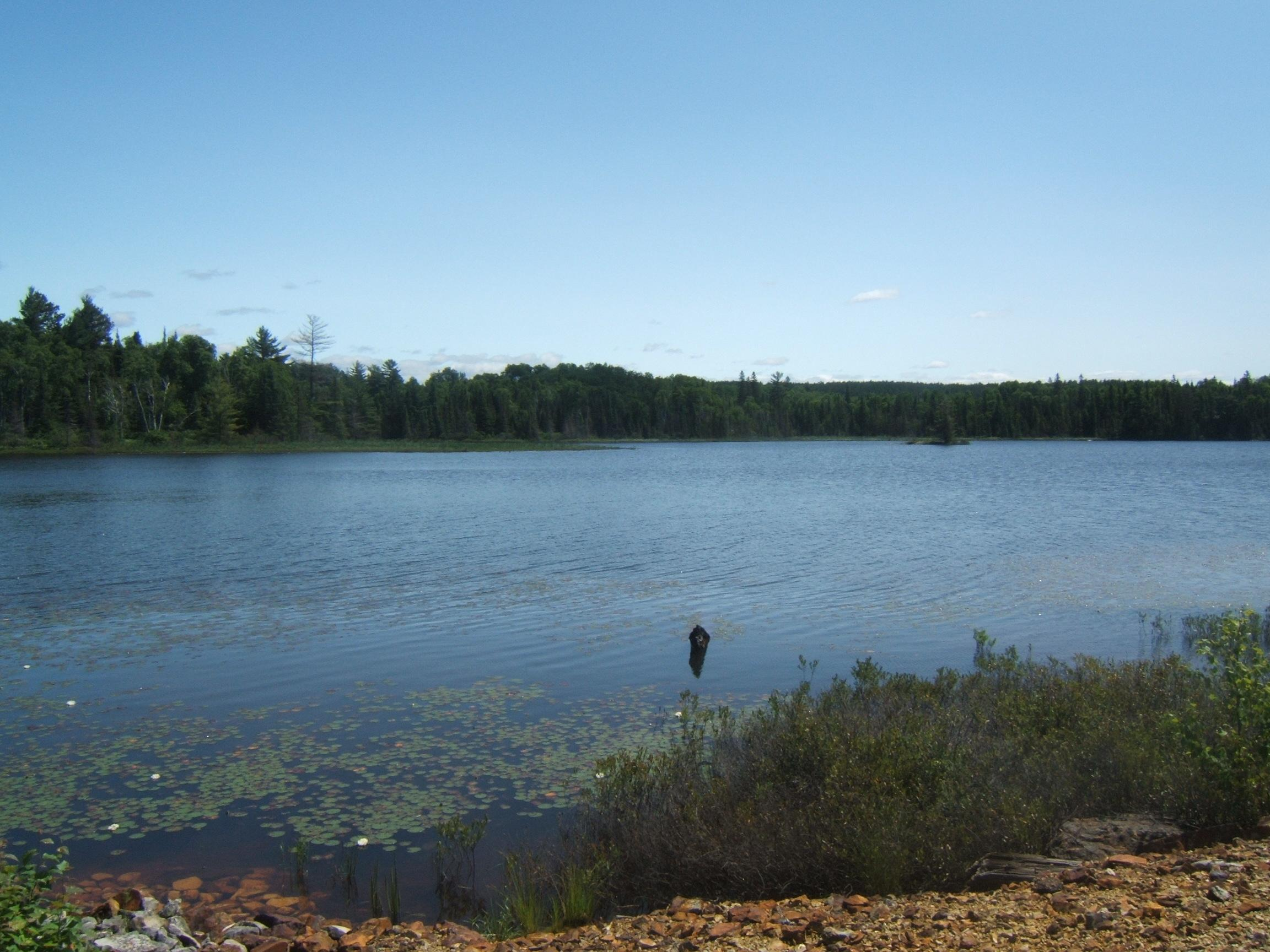
- Southwestern shore of James Lake viewed from Northland Pyrite Mine.

- Location within Ontario
- Location: Temagami, Ontario
- Coordinates: 47°10′43.71″N 79°44′14.60″W
- Type: natural freshwater lake with acidic water in part of it
- Basin countries: Canada
- Max. length: 2.25 kilometres (1.40 mi)
- Max. width: 0.36 kilometres (0.22 mi)
- Islands: various islands and islets

James Lake is a lake in northeastern Ontario, Canada, located in the Temagami region along Highway 11.

== History ==
Water levels of James Lake increased and decreased in the early 1900s. The cause of this alternation could have been caused by beavers building dams in the lake's outlet, eventually causing the water levels in rise. This rise in water levels began to cease in 1906 when operations of Northland Pyrite Mine on the lake's southwestern shore dumped waste rock into the lake. Erosion of the waste rock resulted in the development of acidic lake waste waters next to the waste pile, causing neighboring organisms to disappear.

== See also ==
- Lakes of Temagami
