= Marten River, Ontario =

Human settlement in Ontario, Canada

Marten River
- Unincorporated community
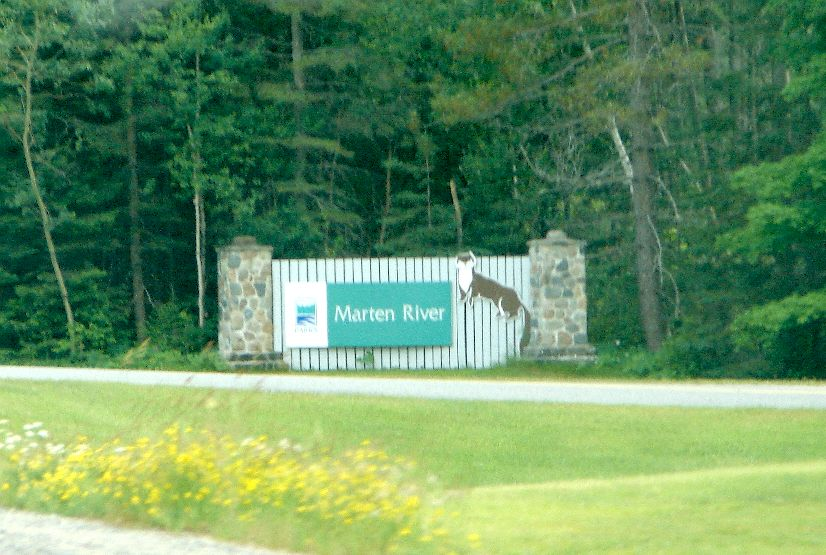
- Entrance to Marten River Provincial Park

- Location within Ontario
- Coordinates: 46°43′59″N 79°49′05″W
- Country: Canada
- Province: Ontario
- District: Nipissing
- Municipality: Temagami
- Named for: Marten River

Government
  - Fed. riding: Nipissing—Timiskaming
  - Prov. riding: Timiskaming—Cochrane
- Time zone: UTC-5 (EST)
  - Summer (DST): UTC-4 (EDT)
- Postal code: P0H 1T0
- Area codes: 705

Marten River is an unincorporated dispersed hamlet located in the municipality of Temagami, in the District of Nipissing, Ontario, Canada. The latest census 2005 puts the community's population at 87. It is named after the adjacent river.

Located at the intersection of Highway 11 and Highway 64, the community is located in the transition zone between the Great Lakes–St. Lawrence forest of southern and central Ontario and the boreal forest of the north. Marten River is considered the gateway to the Temagami area, and is home to the Marten River Provincial Park. Nearby is also the non-operating Kenny Forest Provincial Park.

The main industry is mining, logging and outdoors tourism. The area has many good lakes for fishing including: Marten Lake, Ingall Lake, Olive Lake and Jumping Cariboo Lake off the old Ferguson Highway.

Ontario Northland motor coaches stop at the Trapper Trading Post on the North Bay–Hearst route.
