= Johnson Lake =

Alpine lake in the state of Idaho

- Location within Idaho Location within the United States
- Location: Elmore County, Idaho
- Coordinates: 43.945847°N 115.144086°W
- Lake type: Glacial
- Primary inflows: Johnson Creek
- Primary outflows: Johnson Creek to Middle Fork Boise River
- Basin countries: United States
- Max. length: 0.15 mi (0.24 km)
- Max. width: 0.09 mi (0.14 km)
- Surface elevation: 8,010 ft (2,440 m)
- Islands: 1

Johnson Lake is a small alpine lake in Elmore County, Idaho, United States, located in the Sawtooth Mountains in the Sawtooth National Recreation Area. The lake is accessed from Sawtooth National Forest a cutoff of trail 459 along Johnson Creek.

Johnson Lake is in the Sawtooth Wilderness, and a wilderness permit can be obtained at a registration box at trailheads or wilderness boundaries. There is one small island in the lake that is about 70 ft (21 m) long. Johnson Lake is 0.33 mi (0.53 km) downstream of The Hole.

== See also ==
- List of lakes of the Sawtooth Mountains (Idaho)
- Sawtooth National Forest
- Sawtooth National Recreation Area
- Sawtooth Range (Idaho)
