= Jumping Cariboo Lake =

Lake in Ontario, Canada

- Byers Bay, Camp Cariboo

- Location within Ontario
- Location: Temagami
- Coordinates: 46°52′57″N 79°46′32″W
- Primary inflows: Ingall Lake, natural springs
- Primary outflows: Cariboo Creek
- Catchment area: Twin Sisters
- Basin countries: Canada
- Max. length: 5 km (3.1 mi)
- Max. depth: 56 m (184 ft)
- Islands: 16 Islands-- Larger ones being: Canada Island, Scout Island, Pickerals, Perth Point, Ohio Island, Big Bear Island

Jumping Cariboo Lake, sometimes incorrectly spelled Jumping Caribou Lake, is a lake located within the Municipality of Temagami, in the Nipissing District, Ontario, Canada. It contains small islands and hidden bays. Ojibwa natives of the area have given the lake its name.

== Background ==
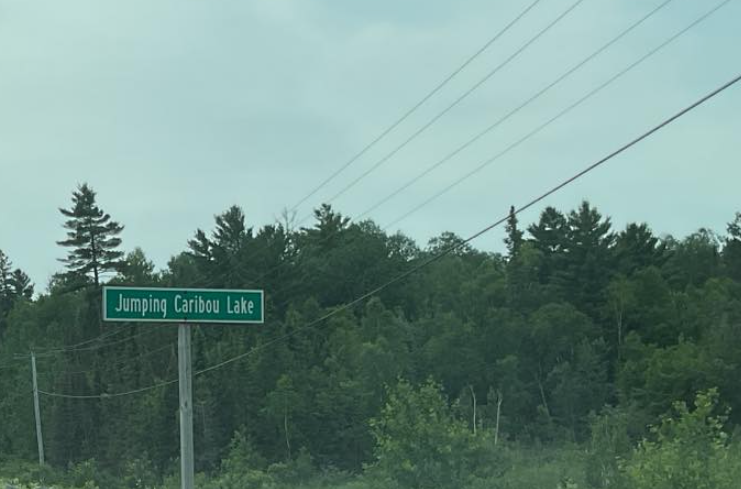
The Road sign says "Caribou"

Jumping Cariboo Lake played an important role in the logging industry from the early 1900s until the late 1920s. The first cabins on the lake were logging cabins located on what is now called Byers Bay off the old Ferguson Highway (now realigned and part of Highway 11). These cabins were part of the logging camp. Similar logging also occurred at Cassels Lake. An extensive network of dams and log chutes were constructed in the area – Allowing the old growth timber harvested to be sent downstream to the saw mills in Sturgeon Falls.

In 1927, Herman Watson Osborn Jr. signed a hundred-year lease for the old logging camp (at that time the lake was located inside a game reserve) and transformed it into a private family cottage on the lake. After the completion of Highway 11, Osborn was able to buy the property from the Crown. In the summer of 1941, Osborn was instrumental in getting Warner Brothers to film Captains of the Clouds (starring James Cagney, Brenda Marshall, Dennis Morgan and Alan Hale Sr.) on Jumping Cariboo Lake. The bay is at the southernmost parts of the lake. It is named after (Ellen O. Byers), Herman Osborn's daughter. There are six generations of Herman Osborn's family still enjoying summers on Jumping Cariboo lake.

In the 19th century, (what we now know as Northern Ontario,) was only accessible by boat. The few people from Ontario that travelled there went up the Ottawa River to Lake Temiskaming. The border between Ontario and Quebec was ill-defined and at the time Quebeckers were encouraged by their provincial government to go to North-West Quebec. There was the promotion of a sort of New Quebec and this concerned the Government of Ontario that had done very little to establish itself in what was mostly unknown bush. A report in 1900 convinced the Government of Ontario that a railway north would be worthwhile. $40,000 was allotted to surveyors for the line through the forest from North Bay to New Liskard. W.B. Russel, civil engineer was assigned to the task of selecting the route north from North Bay.

This was the birth of the Temiskaming and Northern Ontario Railway Company later to become the Ontario Northland Railway. Thus was developed New Ontario.

W.B. Russel, known by many of his cronies as WB was originally from Pembroke, Ontario. WB canoed the route and completed the survey in 1901 and was appointed the first Chief Engineer. He built the railroad along the route that he had picked. WB spent most of his life in the area working on various engineering projects, including building sections of the Ferguson Highway between 1925 and 1927 and sections of the No. 11 highway, complete at the beginning of World War 2. He had visited Jumping Cariboo Lake during his original survey for the route of the railway and again as a contractor building the nearby section of the Ferguson Highway and in the 1930s decided to build his retirement cabin on the property today owned by his grandchildren Jane Stollery Pearce and the Honourable Peter Stollery.

At present, there are 16 private cottages and 1 commercial camp (Ravenscroft Cottages) on the lake. There is boat access at Ravenscroft Cottages as well as access off the King's Highway 11. Fish in the lake include walleye, northern pike, smallmouth bass, white fish and lake trout. Hunting area include moose, bear, grouse, pheasant and rabbit. Winter sports in the area include ice fishing, cross country skiing, dog sledding, snowshoeing and snowmobiling.

== See also ==
- List of lakes of Ontario

== See also ==
- Lakes of Temagami
- Lake Temagami
- Cassels Lake
