= Caribou Mountain (Temagami) =

Hill in Ontario, Canada

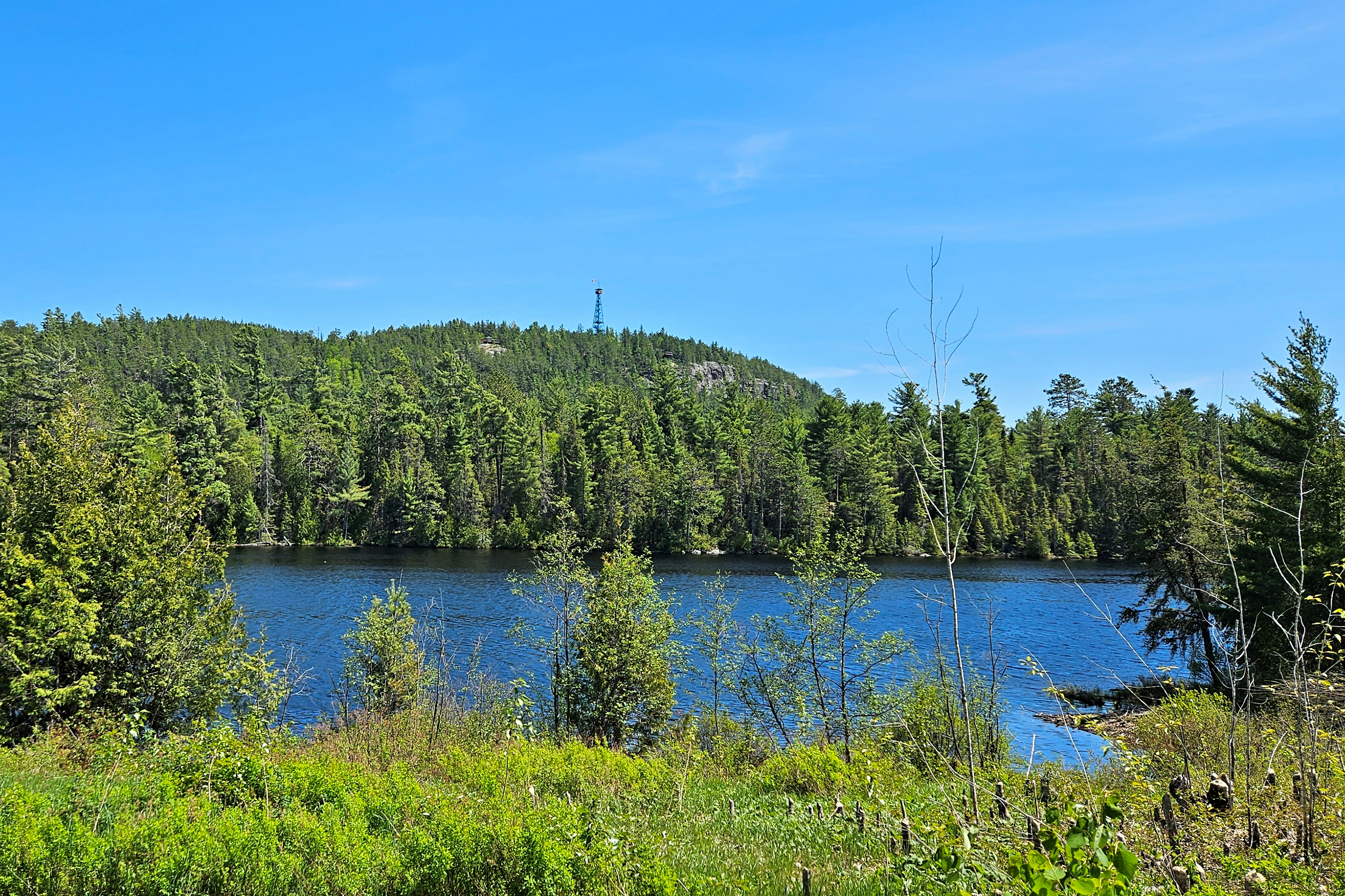

Highest point
- Elevation: 396 m (1,299 ft)
- Coordinates: 47°03′30″N 79°46′45″W

Geography
- Location within Ontario
- Location: Temagami, Ontario
- Parent range: Canadian Shield, unnamed range
- Topo map: NTS 31M4 Témagami

Caribou Mountain is a large hill in Northeastern Ontario, Canada, located 1.5 km (0.93 mi) east of the village of Temagami. It contains a 30 m (98 ft) high fire tower that visitors can climb. Its steep cliff overlooks the village of Temagami and is the closest lookout point to the village. Caribou Mountain, as well as the surrounding area, is situated in the Municipality of Temagami.

== See also ==
- Maple Mountain
- Ishpatina Ridge
