= Rabbit Lake (Temagami) =

Lake in Ontario, Canada

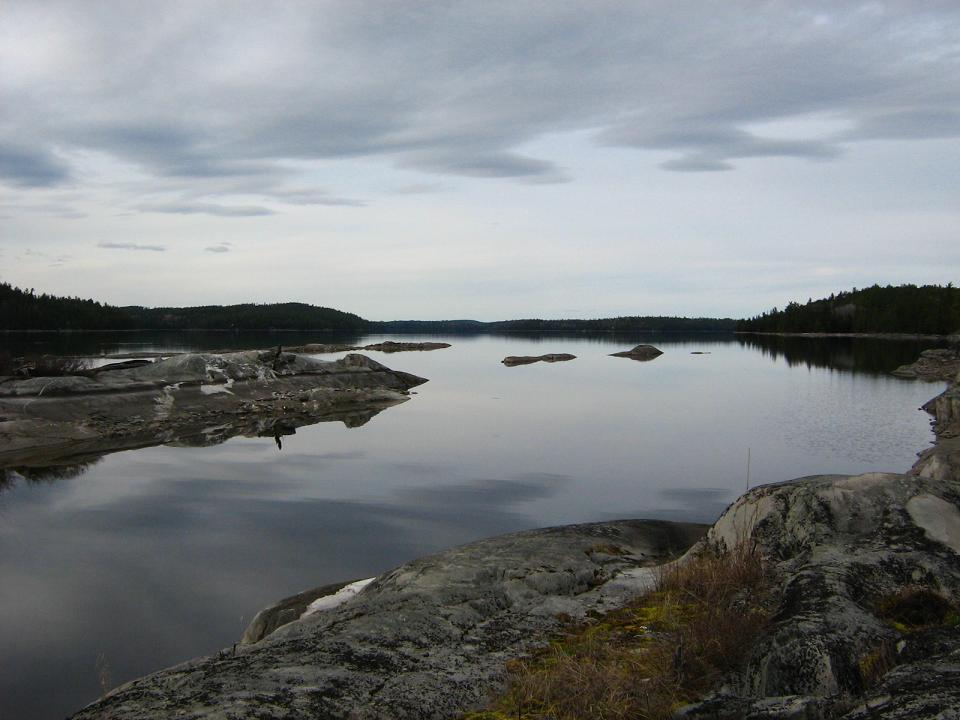
- Hub of Rabbit Lake in the spring

- Location within Ontario Location within Canada
- Location: Temagami, Ontario
- Coordinates: 47.001°N 79.6385°W
- Part of: Ottawa River drainage basin
- Primary inflows: Cassells Lake, Rabbit Creek
- Primary outflows: Matabitchuan River
- Basin countries: Canada
- Surface elevation: 288 m (945 ft)

Rabbit Lake (known as "Waw-bos Nah-mat-ta-bee" in Ojibway) is a lake in the Temagami region of Northeastern Ontario, Canada, and lies within the townships of Askin, Riddell, and Eldridge. The lake is the largest and southernmost in a chain of lakes including Cassels Lake, Snake Island Lake, and Obashkong Lake.

== Importance to First Nations ==
Rabbit Lake was an important trade route to the Natives, and even saw a fight or two.

There is a story about a short fight involving Temagami natives and Iroquois. The story goes that there were some Iroquois camping on an island on the lake, and at night some "Temagami's" went ashore and slit the bottoms of their canoes. The next morning the Iroquois were picked off one by one as their canoes sank in the water.

== Geography ==
=== Forest ===
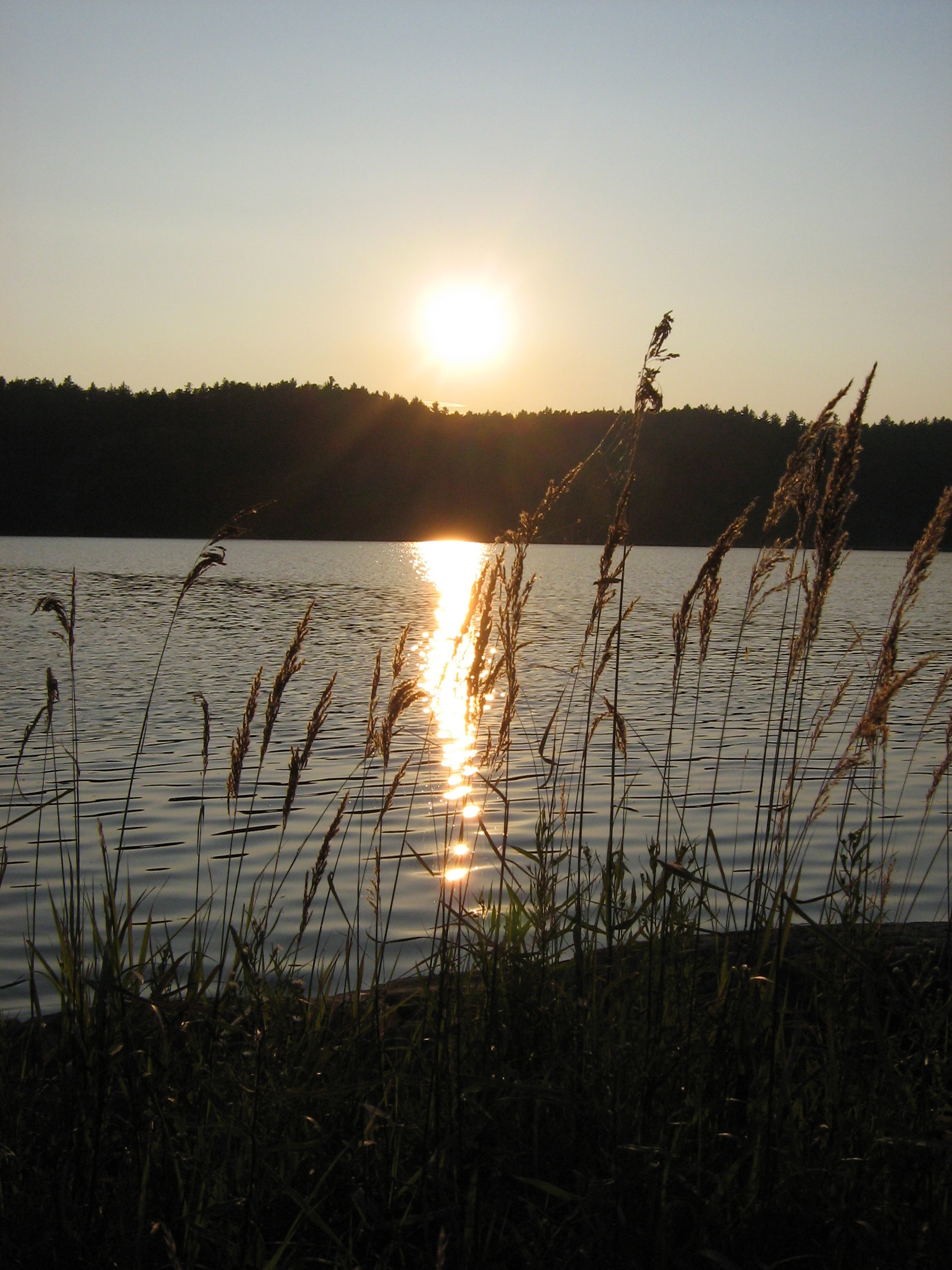
Another Temagami summer sunset.

The forest surrounding the lake has been actively logged since the early 20th century. This is most noticeable north of Rabbit Point, where the forest still has not fully grown back after nearly a century. On the western shore just north of Rabbit Point, lies a 491 hectare area that has never been touched by logging, and has become the Rabbit Lake West Conservation Reserve. The reserve is the least known and the most untouched of its kind in Ontario. This old growth stand is closer to the original Temagami Boreal forest than even the White Bear Forest to the north.

=== Ecosystem ===
Like the other lakes in the region, Rabbit Lake is an oligotrophic ecosystem. While the fish population has steadily declined over the years, the lake is still home to pike, walleye, trout, whitefish, perch, bass, etc.

=== Geology ===
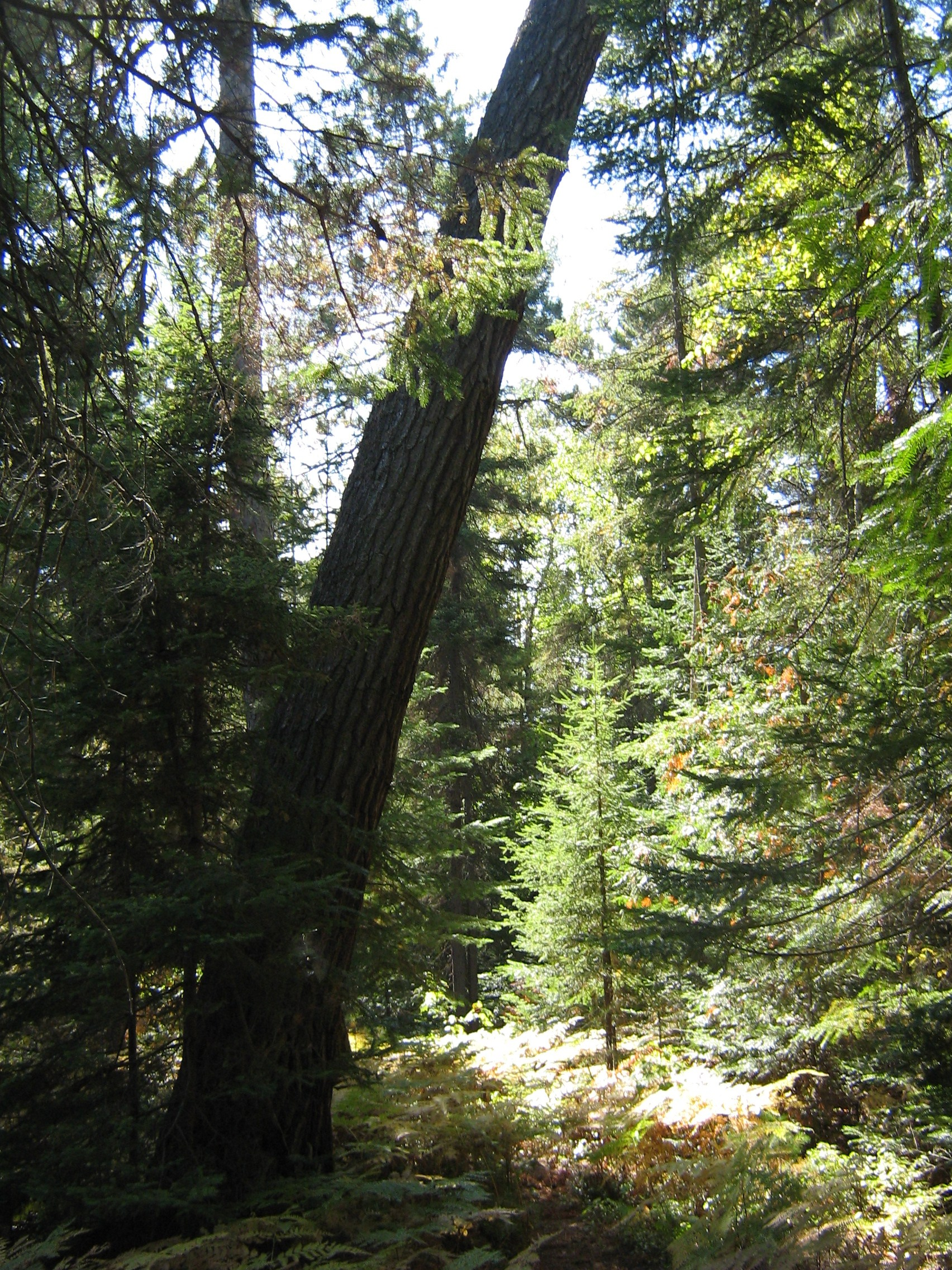
White Pine in the conservation reserve.

The lands surrounding the lake are part of the Canadian Shield, the largest single exposure of Precambrian rocks in the world which were formed after the Earth's crust cooled. The hills in the Temagami area are remnants of the oldest mountain range in North America that date back during the Precambrian era. These heavily eroded mountains would have rivaled the Himalayas in grandeur. The uplifting was accomplished as enormous pressure caused the earth to buckle in a process called folding. Other processes, such as volcanic activity and geologic faulting in which the earth cracks open also contributed to the formation of these mountains. Over millions of years, these enormous mountains were gradually eroded to the land we know today in Temagami. While Rabbit Lake is a fairly quiet lake dotted with cottages, the forest is continually logged and the threat of mining is looming ever closer with the discovery of kimberlite, a volcanic rock notable as a diamond indicator. This in turn forms part of the Temagami Greenstone Belt, an Archean greenstone belt characterized by felsic-mafic volcanic rocks.

== Hollywood ==
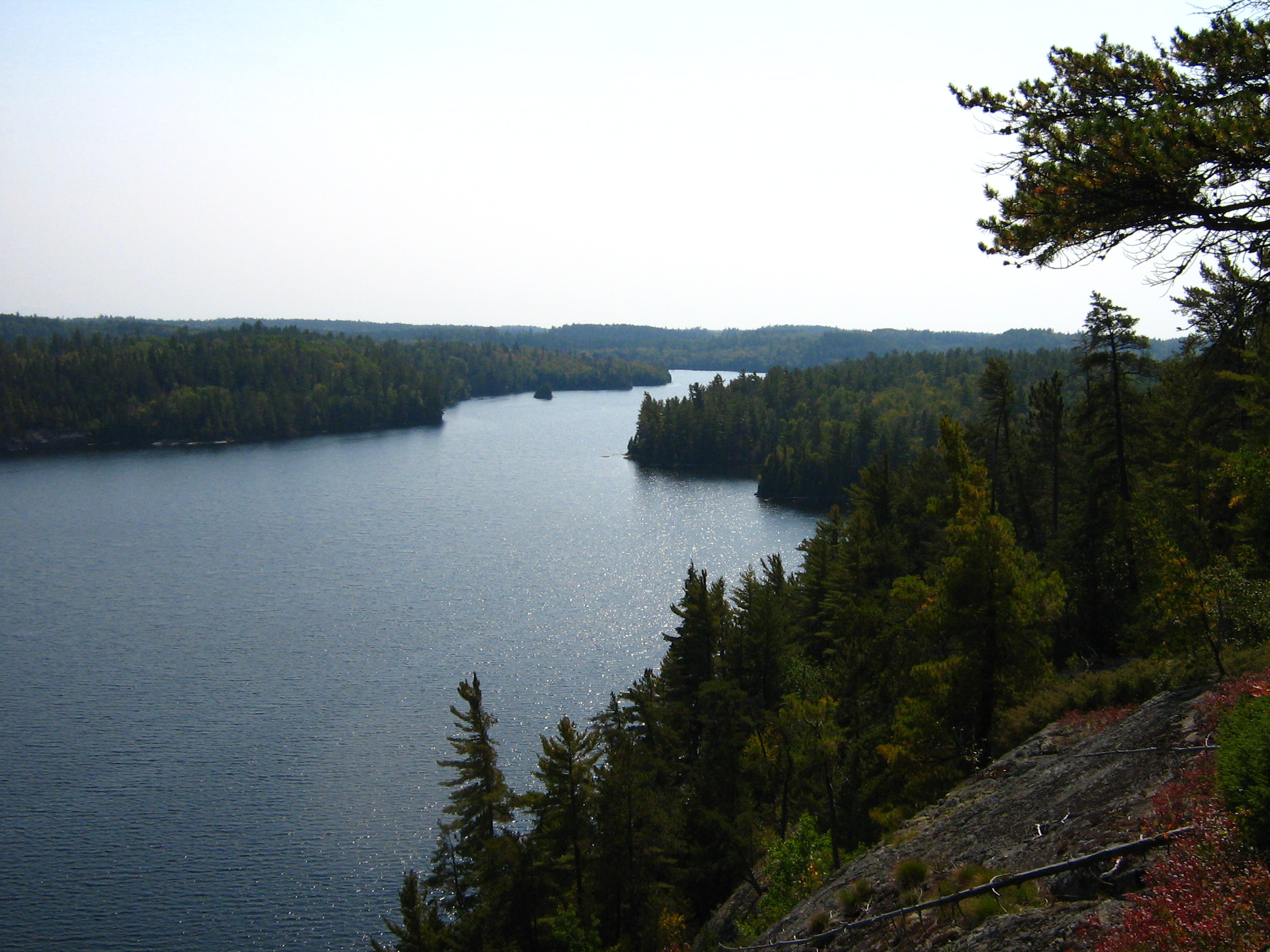
Rabbit Lake South

Hollywood has also visited the lake when scenes from the James Cagney movie "Captains of the Clouds" were filmed at Matabitchuan Lodge, a wilderness lodge in the north-east bay, on Rabbit Lake. Props from the movie can be seen on display in the lodge. This movie was also the first Hollywood movie to be filmed entirely on location in Canada.

== Geography ==
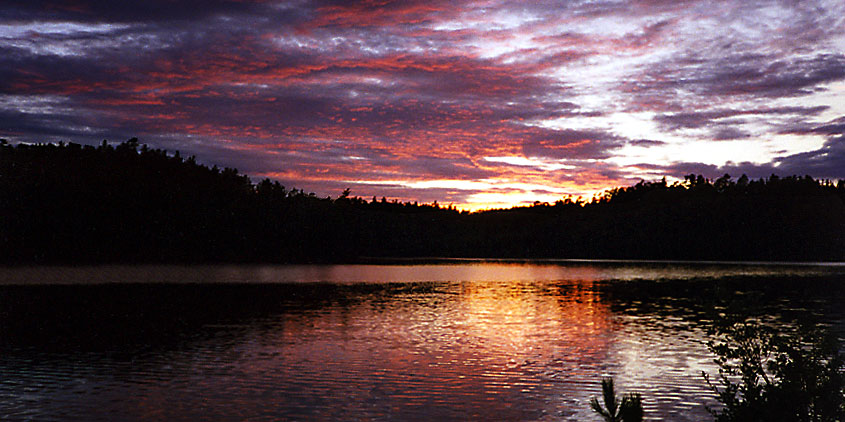
Sunset on Rabbit Lake

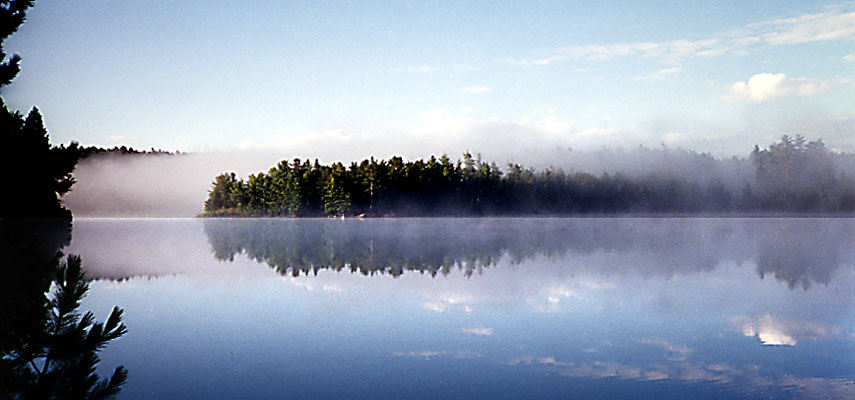
Morning on Rabbit Lake

== See also ==
- Lakes of Temagami
- Cassels Lake
- Lake Temagami
- Rabbit Lake Occurrence
