= Ottawa River drainage basin =

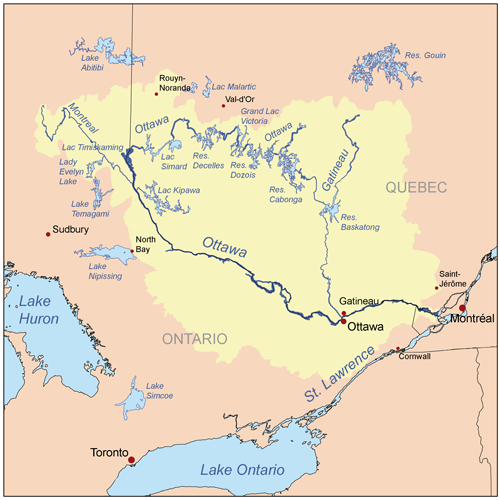
- The Ottawa River drainage basin drains to the Saint Lawrence River, a large river that extends northeasterly from the Great Lakes.

Geography
- Country: Canada
- Interactive map of Ottawa River drainage basin

The Ottawa River drainage basin is the drainage basin in northern North America where surface water empties into the Ottawa River and adjoining waters. Spanning an area of about 146,300 km^{2} (56,500 mi^{2}), it is the 12th largest drainage basin in Canada, occupying the Canadian provinces of Ontario and Quebec. It accounts for about 11% of the total Saint Lawrence River drainage area.
