= Cassels Lake =

- White Bear Lake (former name)
- Location within Ontario
- Location: Temagami, Ontario
- Coordinates: 47°04′N 79°43′W
- Type: natural freshwater lake
- Primary outflows: Rabbit Lake (Temagami)
- Basin countries: Canada
- Max. length: 9.2 miles (14.8 km)
- Max. width: 0.67 miles (1.08 km)
- Surface elevation: 285 metres (935 ft)
- Islands: numerous islands and islets

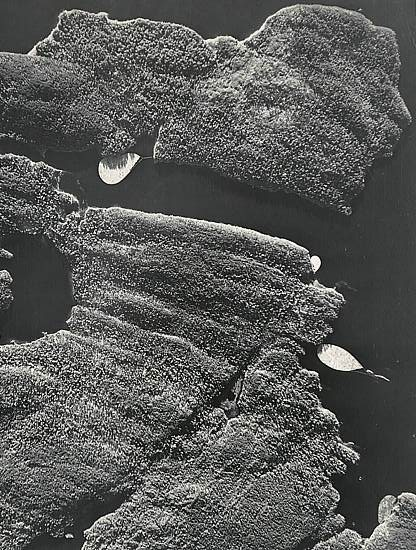
Aerial photo of three log booms on Cassels Lake waiting to be towed to the Gillies sawmill.

Cassels Lake (originally known as White Bear Lake) is a lake located within the Municipality of Temagami, in the Nipissing District, Ontario, Canada. It contains numerous portages, campsites and is one of three lakes on the eastern edge of the White Bear Forest. The lake is named in honour of Sir Walter Cassels, President of the Exchequer Court of Canada.

== History ==
Cassels Lake was originally known as White Bear Lake, named after White Bear (Wabimakwa).

In the 1920s a log dam was constructed at the narrows connecting Cassels Lake and Rabbit Lake to float logs from the surrounding area out to the Ottawa River. The water level in numerous lakes close to Temagami was increased numerous feet. The Gillies' Bros. logging company then cut the trees from the land and the flooded forest area leaving behind the snags and stumps seen in the water. The old growth white pine and red pine immediately south of the mill was never cut and remains today as the 400-year-old White Bear Forest. According to local folklore, this stand wasn't cut because the wife of the mill manager wanted to look out of her home on the majestic pine forest, and so forbid him from cutting there.

The White Bear Forest on the south side of the lake, opposite the former mill, is now a conservation reserve. The reserve has a system of hiking trails, which provide visitors with a great opportunity to experience the old growth pine forest.

== See also ==
- Lakes of Temagami
- Lake Temagami
- Jumping Cariboo Lake
