= Matabitchuan River =

- Location of the mouth of the Matabitchuan River in Ontario

Location
- Country: Canada
- Province: Ontario
- Districts: Nipissing; Timiskaming

Physical characteristics
- Source: Rabbit Lake
  - coordinates: 47°01′41″N 79°35′15″W
  - elevation: 288 m (945 ft)
- Mouth: Lake Timiskaming
  - coordinates: 47°07′45″N 79°27′41″W
  - elevation: 178 m (584 ft)
- Length: 19.7 km (12.2 mi)

The Matabitchuan River is a river in Nipissing and Timiskaming Districts, Ontario, Canada.

== Hydrology ==
The river begins at Rabbit Lake in Nipissing District at an elevation of 288 metres (945 ft). It flows northeast over Rabbit Lake Dam and through Rabbit Chute to take in the left tributary Lorrain Creek. The river continues northeast, passing into Timiskaming District, to Fourbass Lake at an elevation of 274 metres (899 ft) and then empties into the west side of Lake Timiskaming, 1 kilometre (0.6 mi) south of the mouth of the Montreal River. A dam controls the outflow of Fourbass Lake, and some of the water from the lake is diverted through a penstock from a point 47°07′17″N 79°29′54″W southeast of the river outflow to the Ontario Power Generation Matabitchuan Generating Station. Highway 567 leads from the community of North Cobalt (in Temiskaming Shores) to the nearby Lower Notch generating station.

== See also ==
- List of rivers of Ontario

== Sources ==
- "Matabitchuan River". Geographical Names Data Base. Natural Resources Canada.
- "Toporama - Topographic Map Sheets 31M3, 31M4". Atlas of Canada. Natural Resources Canada. Archived from the original on 2010-02-10.
