= Temagami =

- Municipality (single-tier)
- Municipality of Temagami
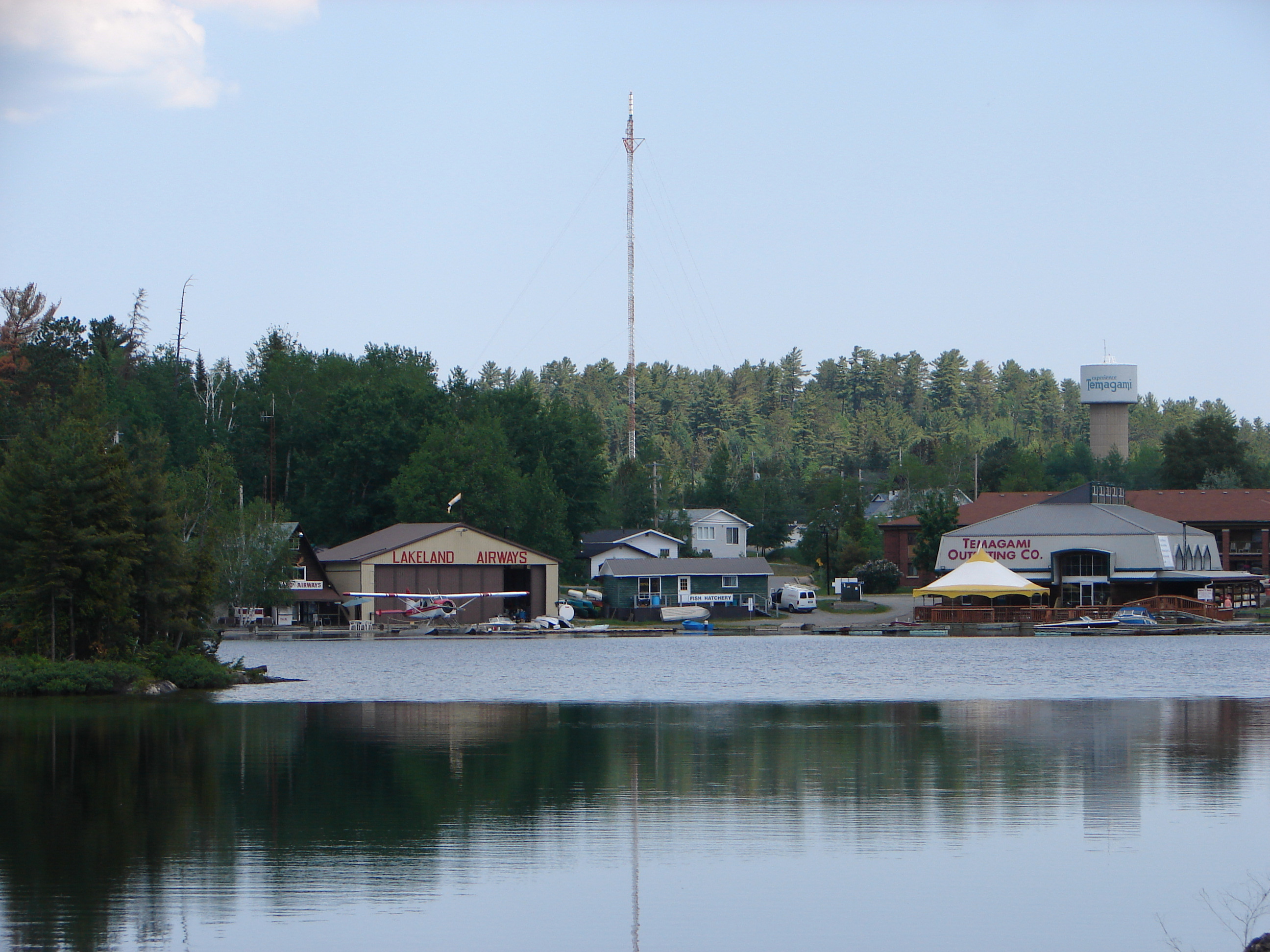
- Temagami on the shores of Lake Temagami

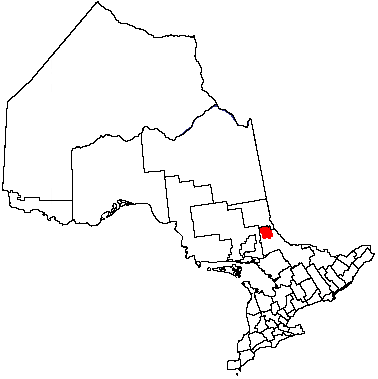
- Location of Temagami in Ontario
- Coordinates: 47°03′45″N 79°47′25″W
- Country: Canada
- Province: Ontario
- District: Nipissing
- Settled: 1903
- Incorporated: 1968 (Improvement District)
- Incorporated: 1978 (Township)

Government
  - Mayor: Dan O'Mara
  - Governing Body: Temagami Town Council
  - MPs: Pauline Rochefort (LPC)
  - MPPs: John Vanthof (ONDP)

Area
  - Total: 1,878.12 km^{2} (725.15 sq mi)

Population (2021)
  - Total: 862
  - Density: 0.5/km^{2} (1.3/sq mi)
- Time zone: UTC−05:00 (EST)
  - Summer (DST): UTC−04:00 (EDT)
- Postal Code: P0H
- Area code: 705
- Website: www.temagami.ca

Temagami, formerly spelled Timagami, is a municipality in northeastern Ontario, Canada, in the Nipissing District with Lake Temagami at its heart.

The Temagami region is known as n'Daki Menan, the homeland of the area's First Nations community, most of whom are Anishinaabe (Ojibwe), living on Bear Island. The official name for this group is the Temagami First Nation. However, a larger group that includes these people, plus non-status residents and some non-residents is called the Teme-Augama Anishnabai.

In addition to the main population centre called Temagami, the municipality also includes the communities of Lake Temagami, Marten River, and Temagami North.

== History ==
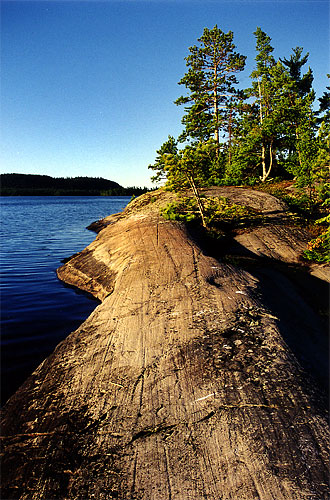
Anima Nipissing

Anishnabai legends describe them migrating from the east coast of North America after a warning from prophets concerning the arrival of a danger from the east. The land was divided into familial hunting and trapping territories.

Since the main east–west fur trade route bypassed Temagami to the south, settlement of this area by Europeans did not come until 1834. That year the Hudson's Bay Company built a store on Temagami Island, which later relocated to Bear Island. The town itself was founded by Dan O'Connor, who in 1903 formed the O'Connor Steamboat and Hotel Company on the lake and established its first store on the future townsite. By 1906, he had built three hotels on Lake Temagami: Hotel Ronnoco, Temagami Inn, and Lady Evelyn Hotel and by 1910 the company operated ten steamships on the lake including the Belle of Temagami.

Discoveries of gold, copper, nickel, and particularly silver in 1903, brought mining to nearby Cobalt and accelerated development of the region. Several mines opened in Temagami, including Big Dan Mine, Little Dan Mine, Barton Mine, Hermiston-McCauley Mine, Temagami-Lorrain Mine, Priest Mine, Beanland Mine, Sherman Mine, Kanichee Mine, Northland Pyrite Mine and Copperfields Mine, which once mined the richest copper ore in Canada.

The Forest Reserves Act of 1898 established the 15,000 km^{2} (5,800 sq mi) Temagami Forest Reserve. Because of this reserve, the region was home to the last Old-growth forests in Ontario. Logging of the vast pine stands only began in the 1920s. Now just a few patches of old growth remain, including the White Bear Forest (12.42 km^{2} [4.80 sq mi]) and the world's largest stand of old-growth red and white pine forest - the Obabika Old-Growth Forest or Wakimika Triangle Forest part of the Obabika River Waterway Provincial Park (25 km^{2} [9.7 sq mi]). This has led to confrontation in recent years between loggers and environmentalists when new logging access roads are built or major logging operations are proposed. Access to many old-growth areas is provided on local hiking trails and canoe routes.

The inspiration and wonder of the area were brought to millions around the world in 1907 when Grey Owl arrived in Temagami. He was employed by Keewaydin Canoe Camp as a guide, and later by the Ontario Department of Lands and Forests as a ranger. His subsequent books and extensive lecturing in Britain and the United States brought tremendous attention to northeastern Ontario and wildlife conservation.

In 1968, Temagami was incorporated, first as an Improvement District, and 10 years later as a Township, consisting of the geographic townships of Strathy and Strathcona, together with parts of Briggs, Chambers, Best, Cassels, and Yates townships.

In 1973, The Teme-Augama Anishnabai (TAA) exercised a land caution against development on the Crown land of 10,000 km^{2} (3,900 sq mi), most of the Temagami area. The Attorney General of Ontario pursued legal action against the Band for this caution. The TAA lost this court case in 1984 and the Band proceeded with an appeal to the Supreme Court of Canada. The Band lost this appeal and eventually the caution was lifted.

In 1988, the Ontario Minister of Natural Resources, Vince Kerrio approved the expansion of the Red Squirrel Road, directly through Anishnabe territory. This prompted a series of roadblocks by the TAA and by the Temagami Wilderness Society in 1988–1989. The Temagami First Nation's former chief Gary Potts was the leader of the TAA blockades. In 1991 the TAA and the Ontario government created the Wendaban Stewardship Authority to decide what to do with the four townships near the logging road.

On January 1, 1998, the Township of Temagami was greatly enlarged from an area of 320.84 km^{2} (123.88 sq mi) to about 1,900 km^{2} (730 sq mi) through the annexation of 17 unincorporated townships and became the Municipality of Temagami with town status.

== Geography ==
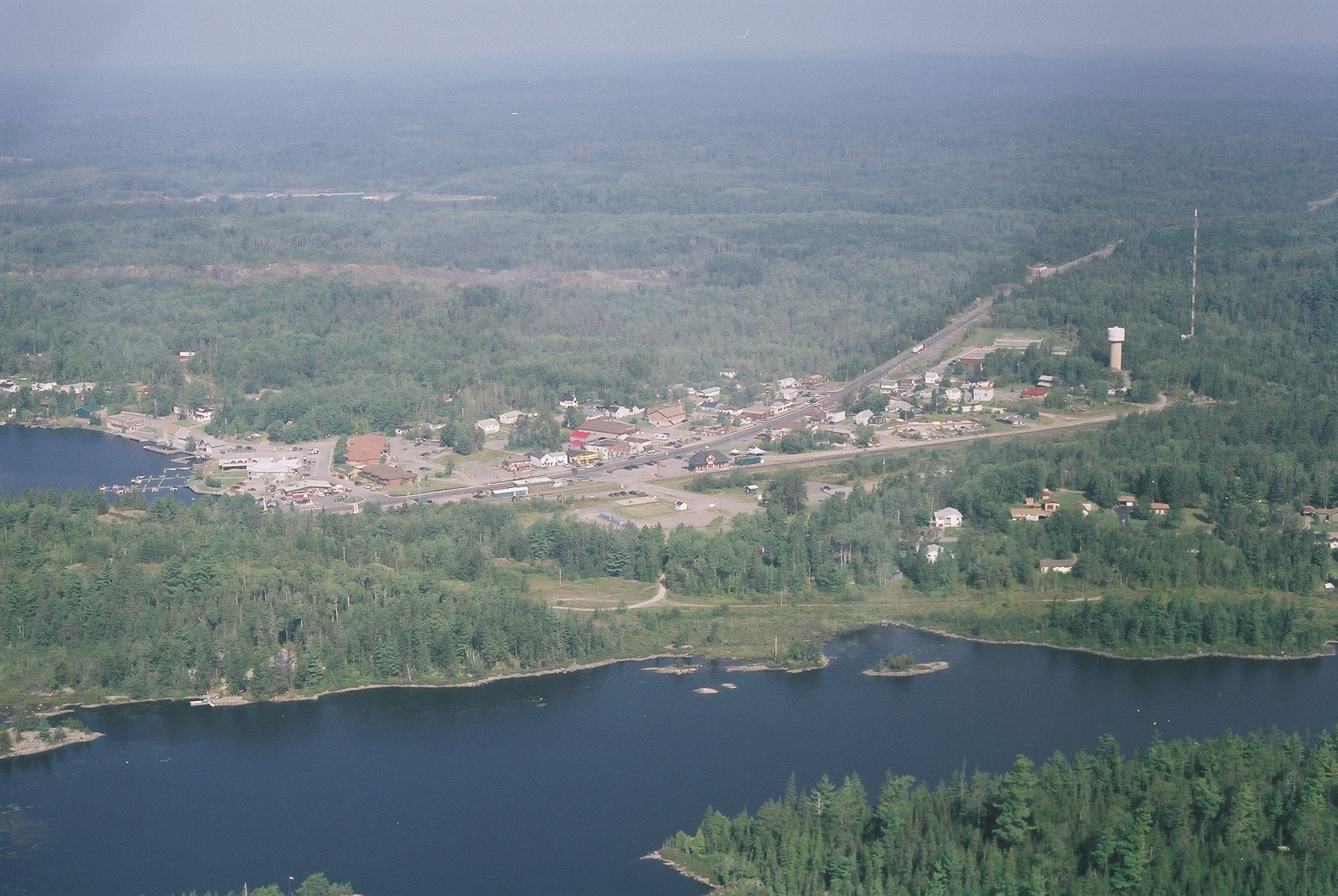
An aerial view of the Temagami townsite, on the banks of Lake Temagami (centre-left) and Caribou Lake (bottom). Sherman Mine's East Pit is visible as a linear brown line above Temagami.

The Temagami land is part of the Canadian Shield, one of the largest single exposure of Precambrian rocks in the world which were formed after the Earth's crust cooled. Temagami land has striking similarities to the Sudbury Structure, which is one of the richest mining camps in the world. The hills in the Temagami area are remnants of the oldest mountain ranges in North America that date back during the Precambrian era. These enormous mountains were taller than any that exist today. The uplifting was accomplished as enormous pressure caused the earth to buckle in a process called folding. Other processes, such as volcanic activity and geologic faulting in which the earth cracks open also contributed to the formation of these mountains. Over millions of years, these enormous mountains were gradually eroded to the land we know today in Temagami.

The rocks that form Temagami to this day are igneous, metamorphic and sedimentary rock. The Temagami area has good potential to host diamondiferous kimberlites and more diamond bearing kimberlites may continue to be discovered in the area. The Temagami area also contains some pillow lava about 2 billion years old, indicating that great submarine volcanoes existed during the early stages of the formation of the Earth's crust.

There are a number of northwest trending faults in the Temagami East claim block area and are associated with the Saint Lawrence rift system and remains seismically active. The most recently felt earthquake in the Temagami area occurred in the year 2000.

Minerals in the Temagami area include aragonite, brochantite, calcite, Chalcopyrite, jasper, magnetite, molybdenite, pentlandite, pyrite, pyrrhotite, serpentine, and talc. A bright white palladium mercury telluride mineral was discovered on Temagami Island in 1973 called temagamite, named after its discovery locality in Copperfields Mine, originally known as Temagami Mine.

Temagami provides rugged topography, which is excellent for canoeing and hiking. There are numerous viewpoints in the municipality, including High Rock and Caribou Mountain, which contains a 100 ft (30 m) fire tower on its summit.

=== Lakes ===
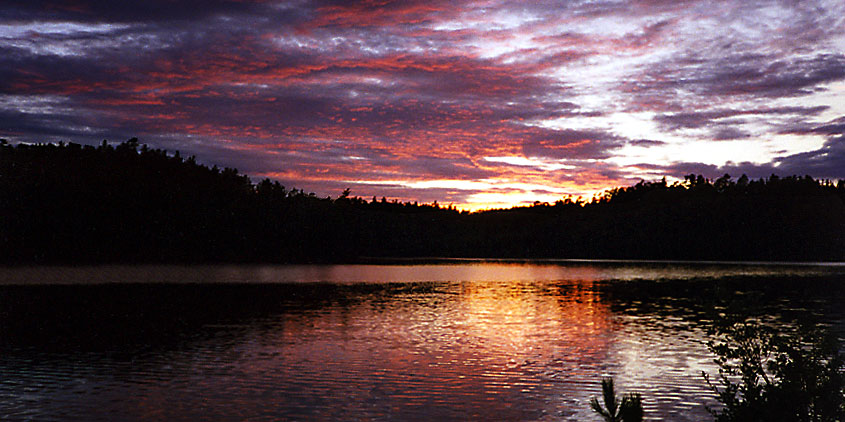
Rabbit Lake

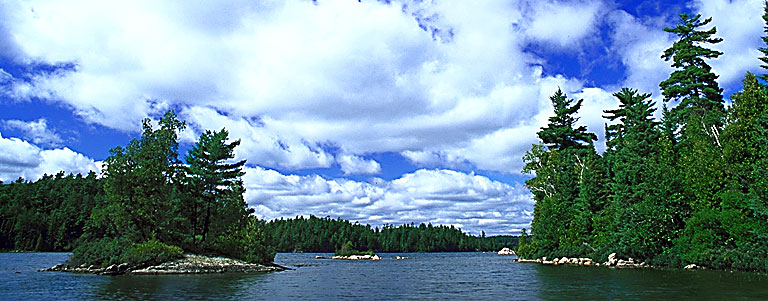
Lake Temagami

Notable lakes located within the Municipality of Temagami include:

- Arsenic Lake
- Cassels Lake
- Cross Lake
- Herridge Lake
- James Lake
- Jumping Cariboo Lake
- Link Lake
- Lower Redwater Lake
- Net Lake
- Obabika Lake
- Poison Pond
- Rabbit Lake
- Rib Lake
- Red Squirrel Lake
- Snake Island Lake
- Snowshoe Lake
- Lake Temagami
- Tetapaga Lake
- Turtle Lake
- Upper Redwater Lake

=== Localities ===
Localities located within Temagami's municipal boundaries are:

Settlements:

- Bear Island
- Doherty
- Gillies Townsite
- Kitts Trailer Park
- Marten River
- Milne Townsite
- Owaissa
- Redwater
- Temagami
- Temagami North

Geographic townships:

- Askin Township
- Aston Township
- Banting Township
- Belfast Township
- Best Township
- Briggs Township
- Canton Township
- Cassels Township
- Chambers Township
- Cynthia Township
- Joan Township
- Law Township
- LeRoche Township
- Milne Township
- Olive Township
- Phyllis Township
- Riddell Township
- Sisk Township
- Strathcona Township
- Strathy Township
- Torrington Township
- Vogt Township
- Yates Township

Note: Only the eastern halves of Scholes and Clement townships are within the municipality of Temagami.

== Demographics ==
In the 2021 Census of Population conducted by Statistics Canada, Temagami had a population of 862 living in 432 of its 928 total private dwellings, a change of 7.5% from its 2016 population of 802. With a land area of 1,878.12 km^{2} (725.15 sq mi), it had a population density of 0.5/km^{2} (1.2/sq mi) in 2021.

Canada census – Temagami community profile

	2021	2016	2011
Population	862 (+7.5% from 2016)	802 (-4.5% from 2011)	840 (-11.2% from 2006)
Land area	1,878.12 km^{2} (725.15 sq mi)	1,905.92 km^{2} (735.88 sq mi)	1,906.42 km^{2} (736.07 sq mi)
Population density	0.5/km^{2} (1.3/sq mi)	0.4/km^{2} (1.0/sq mi)	0.4/km^{2} (1.0/sq mi)
Median age	61.2 (M: 61.2, F: 61.2)	55.9 (M: 55.9, F: 55.8)	53.3 (M: 53.2, F: 53.4)
Private dwellings	928 (total) 432 (occupied)	806 (total)	1,346 (total)
Median household income	$65,000	$55,324

References: 2021 2016 2011

Historical census populations – Temagami

Year	Pop.	±%
1971	1,422	—
1976	1,327	−6.7%
1981	1,224	−7.8%
1986	1,137	−7.1%
1991	939	−17.4%
1996	871	−7.2%

Year	Pop.	±%
2001	893	+2.5%
2006	934	+4.6%
2011	840	−10.1%
2016	802	−4.5%
2021	862	+7.5%

Population counts are not adjusted for boundary changes. Note that the 2011 and 2016 (and possibly earlier) population above does not include Bear Island, which is a separate census subdivision.
Source: Statistics Canada

== Attractions ==
Some of the main tourist attractions within the community include old-growth red and white pine, Lake Temagami, Caribou Mountain, fishing, showings of Grey Owl from the 1930s, and over 4,000 kilometres (2,500 mi) of canoe routes.

It is also known as the staging point for cottage vacationing and wilderness canoeing trips on Lake Temagami, in Lady Evelyn-Smoothwater Provincial Park, and vast tracts of wilderness in the area. There are several outfitters here that cater to outdoor activity, as well as summer camps such as Keewaydin.

The community is home to the Finlayson Point Provincial Park, which itself offers access to Lake Temagami. An excellent view of the entire Temagami area is offered by the Temagami Fire Tower on Caribou Mountain, a renovated 100 ft (30 m)-tall fire lookout tower that visitors can climb free of charge. The Temagami Fire Tower was last used in the 1970s to spot fires. The original fire tower built here was 45 ft (14 m) high and made of square timber.

== Film and television ==
Temagami and surrounding areas have been used as a location to shoot feature films and TV episodes. Films include the 1941 Captains of the Clouds filmed on Jumping Cariboo Lake (starring James Cagney, Brenda Marshall and Dennis Morgan), 1930 docudrama The Silent Enemy and from 2006 That Beautiful Somewhere. TV includes Survivorman episodes (Plane Crash, and Temagami Hunting Deep Woods) and Mantracker episodes (Ryder and Brendyn, and Ben and Darrell).

== Transportation ==
=== Rail ===
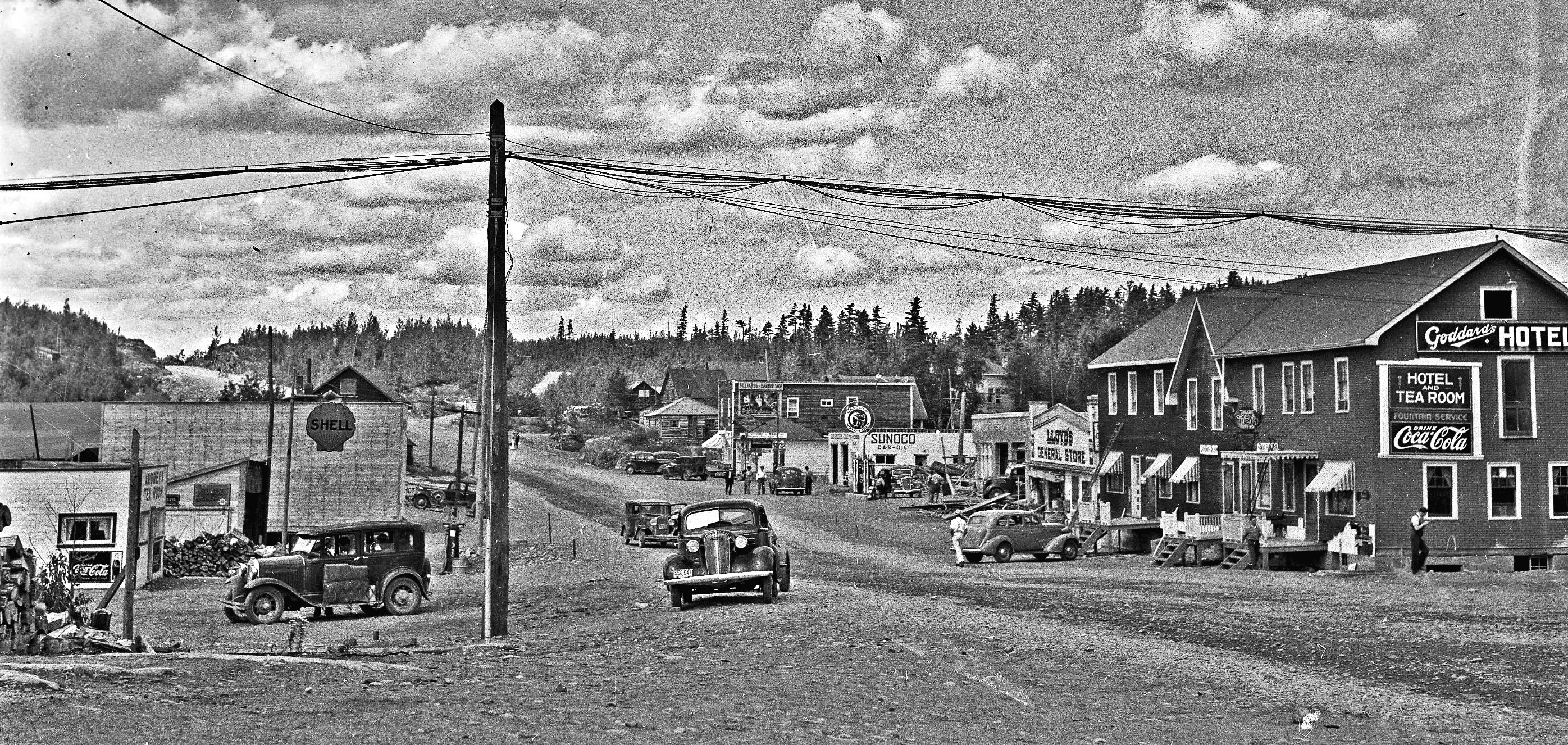
Temagami - 1938

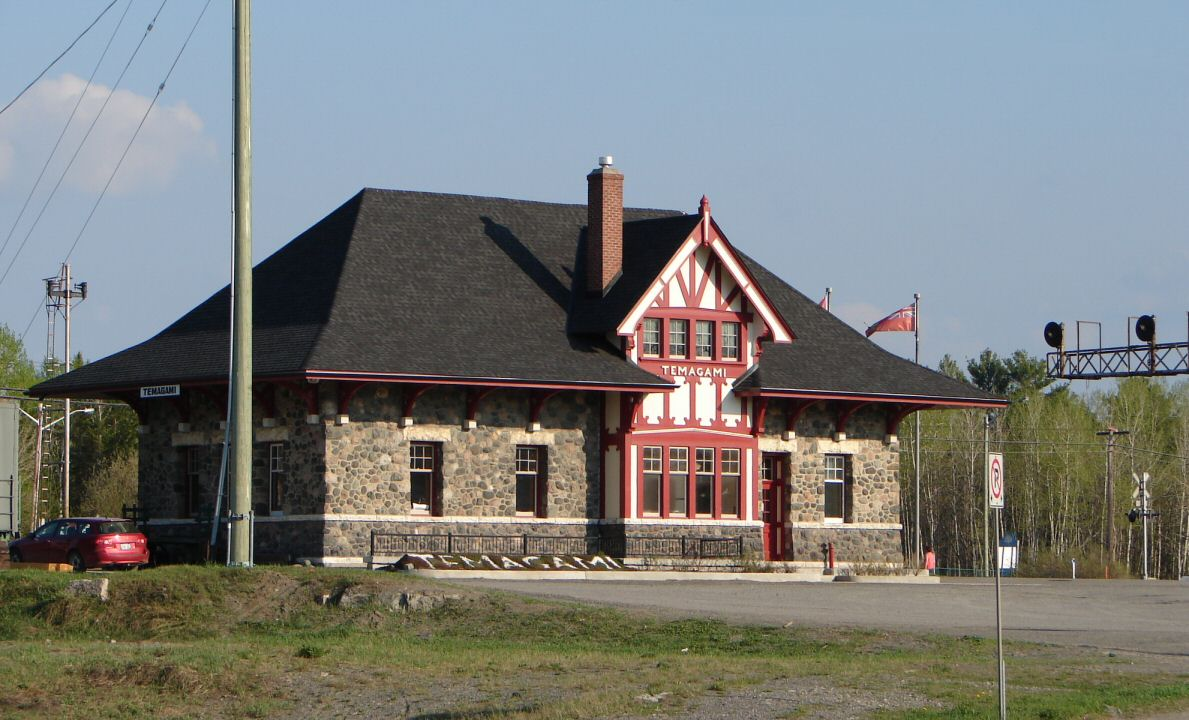
Temagami Railway Station

In the summer of 1905, the Temiskaming and Northern Ontario Railway (now the Ontario Northland Railway) was completed from North Bay to New Liskeard and allowed direct access to the area and the Clay Belt around Lake Timiskaming, opening up the region to settlement and development. The original Temagami station, which opened in 1907, burnt down in 1909 and was rebuilt.

Temagami station was a stop on the Northlander railway service before it was cancelled in 2012, the Northlander is expected to return to service in late 2026.

=== Bus ===
Temagami is served by Ontario Northland's intercity motor coach service along its North Bay–Hearst route, which also serves many communities along the former Northlander route.

There is currently no local bus service in Temagami.

== Notable people ==
- Benjamin Chee Chee, Canadian artist of Ojibwe descent
- Grey Owl, British-born Archibald Belaney who pretended to be First Nations
- Dan O'Connor, Canadian politician, businessman and prospector, founded the community
- Gary Potts, former chief of the Temagami First Nation and the Teme-Augama Anishnabai

== See also ==
- List of mines in Temagami
