= Beanland Mine =

Mine in Ontario, Canada

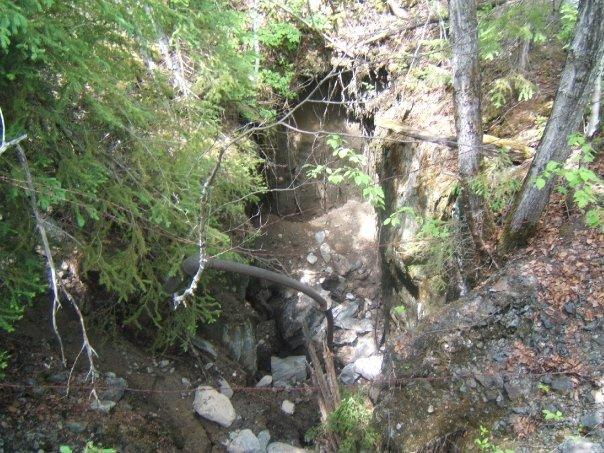
- The Beanland Mine shaft in 2009

- Location in Ontario

Location
- Location: Temagami, Ontario, Canada; 47°05′29.76″N 79°49′34.56″W

Production
- Products: Gold and silver
- Production: No records.

History
- Discovered: 1929
- Opened: 1936
- Closed: 1938

Beanland Mine, also known as Clenor Mine, is an abandoned surface and underground mine in Northeastern Ontario, Canada. It is located about 1 km (0.62 mi) west of Arsenic Lake and 4 km (2.5 mi) northwest of the town of Temagami in central Strathy Township. It is named after Sydney Beanland, who first claimed the mine site in the 1920s and was a director for the mine from 1937 to 1938.

Mining operations began at Beanland in the mid-1930s when the Temagami area was the scene of very active prospecting and mining ventures. Gold and silver were the mine's primary commodities. Active mining operations on the site ceased in the late 1930s, but mineral exploration has occurred there periodically since. Mineral exploration at Beanland remained idle from the early 1970s to the early 1990s as a result of a land claim dispute applied by Temagami First Nations. However, exploration resumed shortly after the dispute was withdrawn in the early 1990s.

The mine consists of a 3-compartment vertical shaft, an open pit, lateral workings, a waste rock dump and various structures from pre-existing buildings. Basalt and andesite are the primary rock types at Beanland, forming part of the Younger Volcanic Complex, the site's major geological feature. A zone of deformation intersects the local basaltic bedrock, which is the location of several minerals.

== History ==
=== Background ===
Beanland Mine is named after Sydney Beanland, a Canadian prospector who first claimed the site in 1929. It was one of the four gold mines in Strathy Township that were in operation during the 1930s. The others were Manitoba and Eastern Mine, Cuniptau Mine and Hermiston-McCauley Mine, all of which were closed by 1938. They were part of a prospecting/mining boom that began in the 1930s and continued until the 1940s. This was one of the most active prospecting and mining scenes in the Temagami area during the 20th century.

Beanland correlates with some of the earliest gold mining in the Temagami area, which continued sporadically from a number of other mines until the 1970s. It was mined both as a primary and secondary product at surface and underground mines. Consequently, Beanland is one of the earliest gold mines in Temagami along with Manitoba and Eastern, Cuniptau and Hermiston-McCauley mines.

=== Mine development ===
Work began in September 1936 by Goodfish Mining Company Limited. Mine buildings, consisting of a power house, shaft house and headframe, office, storehouse, cookery, bunk houses, stables, pump house and gunpowder magazine, were built. These were all of frame or log construction. The plant consisted of a 150 horsepower boiler, a 17.7 m^{3} (625 cu ft) air compressor, a 15.2 cm (6.0 in) wide and 20.2 cm (8.0 in) long steam hoist, steel-sharpening equipment and three duplex pumps. A vertical, 3-compartment shaft was sunk to a depth of 21 m (69 ft). Some 610 m (2,000 ft) of surface trenching was also completed during the year. An average of 17 men was employed in 1936. Douglas Briden was mine manager and the mine office was in Temagami.

Goodfish Mining Company Limited operated Beanland Mine until July 1937 when it was incorporated as Beanland Mining Company Limited. The officers and directors were A. J. Perron (president), M. G. Hunt (secretary), J. G. Black (assistant-secretary), Sydney Beanland and Edwin E. Pearlman (directors). The head office was at the town of Kirkland Lake and the mine office was in Temagami. The vertical 3-compartment shaft was sunk a further 87 m (285 ft) to a total depth of 108 m (354 ft). Levels were established at the 53 m (174 ft) and 99 m (325 ft) horizons. Some 292 m (958 ft) of crosscutting, 413 m (1,355 ft) of drifting and 121 m (397 ft) of raising were done. Douglas Briden was superintendent, employing an average of 28 men in 1937.

In 1938, Beanland Mining Company Limited deepened the 3-compartment shaft from 108 m (354 ft) to 154 m (505 ft) and a new level was established at the 145 m (476 ft) horizon. Some 26 m (85 ft) of drifting and 27 m (89 ft) of crosscutting were accomplished. Underground diamond drilling amounted to 150 m (490 ft). Mining operations ceased on April 10, 1938. The officers and directors were A. J. Perron (president), M. G. Hunt (secretary-treasurer), Sydney Beanland, T. M. Mungovan and Dr. W. H. Wilson (directors). Douglas Briden was manager, employing an average of 21 men.

Although a mining and milling plant was constructed on the mine site before Beanland went into operation, there is no record of production. The entire plant was still in existence until at least the 1940s. It is now largely demolished; foundations, the 150 horsepower boiler and part of the Ingersoll-Rand Imperial Type 10 air compressor are all that remains of the plant. Much of the waste rock was dumped just northeast of the shaft near a small wetland.

=== Mineral explorations ===
Extensive surface work and diamond drilling was performed in 1934-1935 by The Consolidated Mining and Smelting Company of Canada. From this work a 48.9 m (160 ft) long and 13.8 m (45 ft) wide ore deposit was discovered, which assayed 0.31 oz (8.8 g) of gold per ton and 1.8 oz (51 g) of silver per ton. In 1946, Beanland Mine was incorporated as Perron Gold Mines Limited. The company carried out 1,137 m (3,730 ft) of surface diamond drilling, but A. J. Perron, who was president, died in 1946 and Beanland never went into full-scale commercial production.

In 1973, the Temagami Land Caution was applied by the Aboriginal community of Teme-Augama Anishnabai to protest against development on Crown land in the Temagami area. It existed throughout much of the 1970s and 1980s, prohibiting all types of mineral exploration at Beanland and other mines in Strathy Township. As a result, the area received little attention during a gold exploration boom that occurred during the same decades. Sherritt-Gordon Mines Limited evaluated Beanland in 1983 and estimated total ore reserves as 24,000 tons grading 0.22 oz (6.2 g) of gold per ton. In 1991, the Supreme Court of Canada decided that the Anishnabai community no longer had aboriginal title to the land they claimed. This allowed mineral exploration in Strathy Township once again. However, the Temagami Land Caution was not entirely lifted until 1995 as a result of a court order.

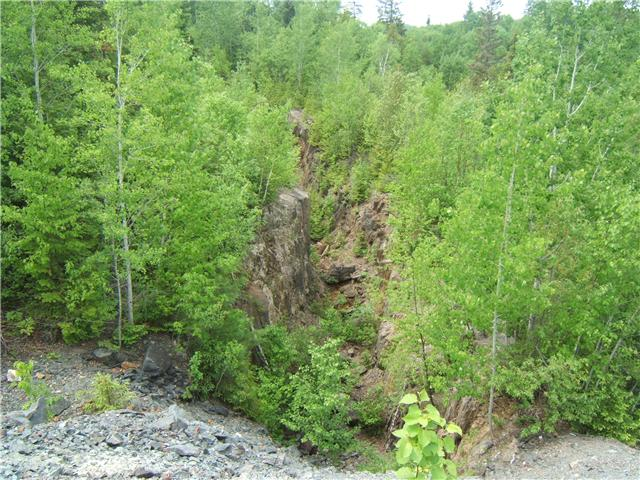
The 1992 Gwen Resources test pit

In 1991, Gwen Resources Limited performed a detailed program of diamond drilling, geological mapping, trenching and surveying at Beanland. After this work was completed, a 3,392 ton bulk sample was taken from an open pit in January 1992 to confirm old assay results on the Beanland Vein. Equipment consisted of a Caterpillar D6, a Gardner-Denver hydraulic track drill and a John Deere backhoe to remove the blasted material. The extracted ore was shipped to the Kerr-Addison Mine mill in Virginiatown for processing. All of the ore was stockpiled in the mill yard rather than being directly dumped into the crusher and therefore directly into the mill. Because the ore was stockpiled, where it froze and had to be blasted, it was handled twice which put up the costs of the milling. The mill results were not as high as expected. It was discovered that the ore had a higher percentage in silver than gold. The cause of this was probably due to a deposit of silver hidden in the very high erratic values of gold and silver. Such an occurrence is quite common in the Cobalt-Temagami area. Since the bulk sample was taken in January 1992, it was very cold and experienced a lot of dilution of ore due to overload of holes. Because of the cold weather, the test pit had to be 2.7 m (9.0 ft) wide. Beanland Mine has remained idle since 1992.

== Geology ==
=== Regional terrane ===
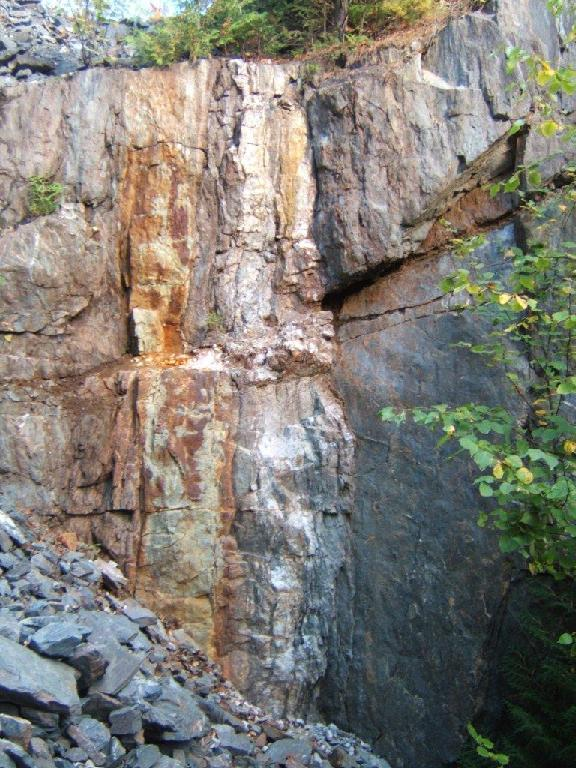
A vertical quartz vein exposed in Gwen Resources' test pit

Beanland is situated in the Temagami Greenstone Belt, a 2,736 million year old sequence of metamorphosed igneous and sedimentary rocks that forms part of the much larger Superior craton. The belt is exposed through the Huronian Supergroup and represents an isolated southern exposure of the Abitibi Subprovince.

Volcanic activity in the Temagami Greenstone Belt spanned from 2,736 to 2,687 million years ago, indicating that it was a zone of active volcanism for at least 49 million years. The Younger Volcanic Complex, a unit of the Temagami Greenstone Belt made of mostly mafic volcanic rocks, is the main volcanic complex at Beanland. A series of intrusions penetrate the complex and three major zones of deformation have been identified, namely the Northeast Arm Deformation Zone, the Link Lake Deformation Zone and the Net Lake-Vermilion Lake Deformation Zone.

The predominant bedrock at Beanland Mine is basalt and andesite. A series of sheared, carbonatized rhyolite lava flows are exposed north of Beanland. These form part of the Older Volcanic Complex, a unit of the Temagami Greenstone Belt made of mostly felsic volcanic rocks. To the south, Beanland is bordered by massive pillowed andesite and basalt flows, which comprise the Younger Volcanic Complex. These two flow units are separated by a large, highly deformed iron formation that overlies the Younger Volcanic Complex. The northeasterly trending Net Lake-Vermilion Lake Deformation Zone follows the two flow units, as well as the iron formation.

=== Mineralization ===
The mineralization at Beanland was discovered by Paul Hermiston and Robert McCauley in 1934. It is situated in a vertical dipping quartz vein network that is 170 m (560 ft) long and has a maximum width of 1.5 m (5.0 ft). Two types of mineralization exist, one type being auriferous quartz-carbonate veins with combinations of pyrite, galena, sphalerite and chalcopyrite present. The other is a simpler quartz vein with a combination of chalcopyrite, arsenopyrite and pyrite mineralization. The auriferous pyrite-sulfide quartz veins are the most important mineral structures and most of the underground development work was performed on them, including the Beanland Vein. These quartz veins are on the southeastern margin of the Net Lake-Vermilion Lake Deformation Zone, which is known for a high frequency of gold occurrences.

== See also ==
- List of gold mines in Canada
- List of mines in Temagami
- List of silver mines
