= List of silver mines =

This is a list of silver mines in alphabetical order and includes both operating and closed mines.

== Africa ==
=== Morocco ===
• Zgounder Silver Mine

• Imiter

== Australia ==
- Golden Grove Mine
- McArthur River zinc mine
- Mount Isa Mines
- Mount Morgan Mine
- Prominent Hill Mine

== Europe ==
=== Finland ===
- Sotkamo Silver

=== Germany ===
- Glasebach Pit
- Samson Pit

=== Greece ===
- Saiderocaus

=== Norway ===
- Kongsberg Silver Mines

=== Poland ===
- Historic Silver Mine in Tarnowskie Góry

=== Sweden ===
- Nasa silver mine
- Sala Silver Mine

=== United Kingdom ===
- Combe Martin Silver mine

== North America ==
=== Canada ===
- Barton Mine
- Beanland Mine
- Big Dan Mine
- Blue Hawk Mine
- Buffalo Mine
- Coniagas Mine
- Copperfields Mine
- Hudson Bay Mine
- Keeley-Frontier Mine
- Murray Brook Mine
- Nipissing Mine
- Nova Scotia Mine
- Priest Mine
- Sullivan Mine
- Temagami-Lorrain Mine
- Trethewey Mine

=== Mexico ===
- Edén
- Mina Proaño
- Naica Mine
- Noche Buena mine
- Pitarrilla mine
- Tayopa
- Valenciana

=== United States ===
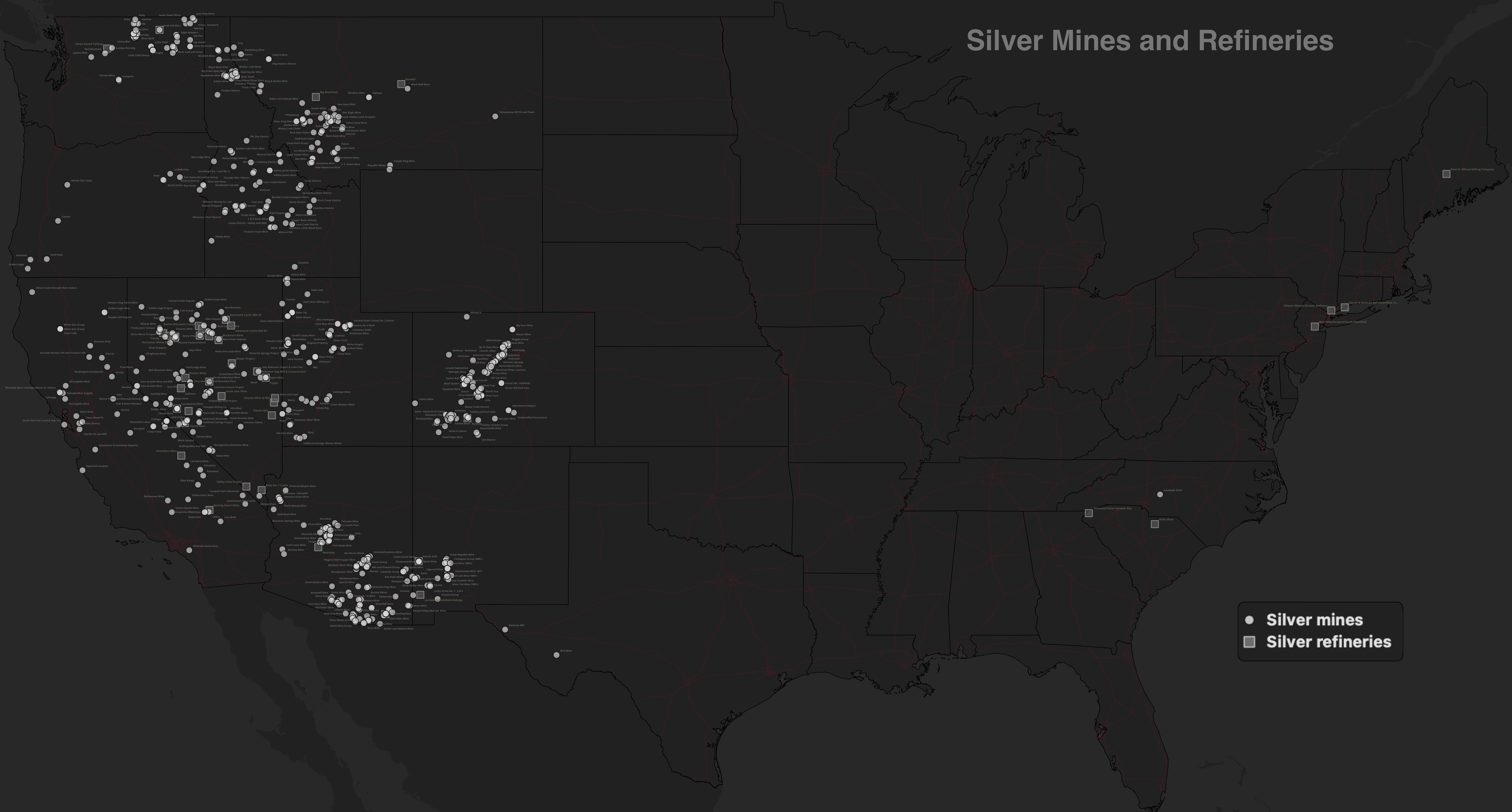
Silver mines and refineries

- Cerro Colorado Mine
- Cliff mine
- Commonwealth Mine
- Emma Silver Mine
- Hercules silver mine
- Homestake Mine
- Independence mine
- Iron Mountain Mine
- Minesota Mine
- Montana mine
- Sherman Mine
- Silver King Mine
- Sunshine Mine
- Sweet Home Mine
- Swift's silver mine

== South America ==
=== Argentina ===
- Cerro Vanguardia Mine

=== Bolivia ===
- San Bartolomé mine

=== Brazil ===
- Morro Velho

=== Peru ===
- Santa Ana mine

== See also ==
- List of countries by silver production
