= Big Dan Mine =

Mine in Temagami, Ontario, Canada

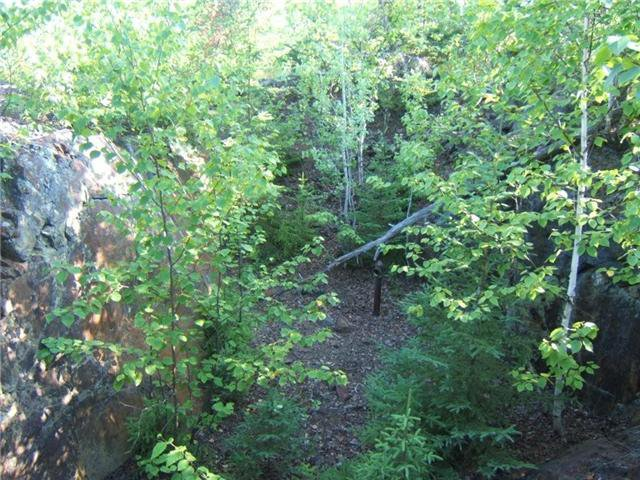
- The northern cement-covered mine shaft of Big Dan

- Location in Ontario

Location
- Location: Temagami, Ontario, Canada; 47°05′28.53″N 79°46′28.95″W

Production
- Products: Gold, silver, arsenic
- Production: No data available.

History
- Opened: 1905
- Closed: 1908

Big Dan Mine is an abandoned underground mine in Northeastern Ontario, Canada. It is located about 1 km (0.62 mi) southwest of Net Lake and just west of the Ontario Northland Railway in east-central Strathy Township. It is named after Dan O'Connor, who first claimed the site in the 1890s.

Mining operations began at the site in the early 1900s, making Big Dan one of the oldest mines in Temagami. Gold and silver were the mine's primary commodities, while arsenic was a secondary commodity. A forest fire destroyed much of the mining infrastructure on the site in 1907. Active mining operations on the site ceased following the fire, but mineral exploration has occurred there periodically since. Mineral exploration at Big Dan remained idle from the early 1970s to the early 1990s as a result of a land claim dispute applied by Temagami First Nations.

The mine consists of two shafts, an open cut and an adit. It is surrounded by a large boreal forest that covers much of the Temagami region. Basalt is the primary rock type at Big Dan, forming part of the Arsenic Lake Formation, the site's major geologic feature. A small zone of deformation intersects the local basaltic bedrock, which is the location of several minerals.

== History ==
=== Background ===
Big Dan Mine is one of the three Temagami mines named after Dan O'Connor (1864–1933), a Canadian prospector and businessman from Pembroke, Ontario. The others are the Little Dan and O'Connor mines, which were also active in the early 1900s. Between 1894 and 1897, Dan O'Connor ventured out on prospecting trips in the Temagami area. It was during this time O'Connor staked claims in the Iron Lake, Vermilion Lake and Kokoko Lake areas. By 1899, O'Connor created test pits at Big Dan, which was followed by a survey for the Ontario Northland Railway route in 1900.

Big Dan correlates with the beginning of sporadic gold mining in the Temagami area, which continued from a number of other mines until the 1970s. It was mined both as a primary and secondary product at surface and underground mines. Consequently, Big Dan is one of the earliest gold mines in Temagami along with Little Dan 1.7 km (1.1 mi) to the west, which is now regarded as part of Leckie Mine at Arsenic Lake.

=== Production and exploration ===
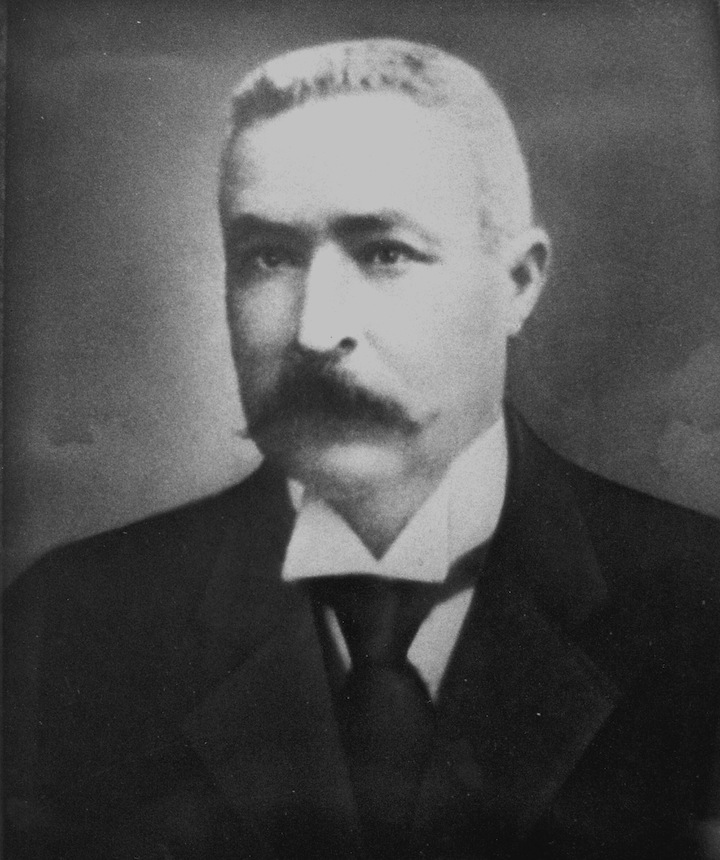
Dan O'Connor, the prospector Big Dan is named after and who first claimed the mine site

The Temagami Mining and Milling Company operated a concentrating plant and worked two shafts, one open cut and one adit from 1905 to 1908. A former railway spur was built into the mine site from Grey's Siding for ore shipments. The shipped ore averaged 0.358 oz (10.1 g) of gold per ton. Analysis of drill core data ranged from trace to 0.6 oz (17 g) of gold per ton and from trace to 4 oz (110 g) of silver per ton. Ore was hoisted by skip then dumped into a Blake jaw crusher at the concentrating plant. It was then dried, passed through roll crushers and elevated to trommels for sizing. The oversized ore passed down through a fine roll crusher. After the reduced ore fragments passed through roll crushers, it was then put through three Kriem air separators in the mill. The ore concentrates from these separators were drawn off and bagged for shipping. A 18 m (59 ft) long and 0.31 m (1.0 ft) wide arsenic vein was also mined during this period. All of the mining infrastructure was subsequently destroyed by a forest fire and operations were not renewed. There are no data available on how much the mine produced. Since the closure of Big Dan, the adit and shafts have been flooded. Remains of the former concentrating plant are also present.

In 1948–1949, the mine was incorporated as Big Dan Mines Limited. It consisted of 240 ha (590 acres) in parcels of local claim block WD271 and eight staked claims. To provide easy access, Big Dan Mines Limited constructed a road from nearby Highway 11 to the mine site. Big Dan Mines Limited carried out a resistivity survey and 806 m (2,644 ft) of diamond drilling in 11 holes to assess the mine's production potential, but results were not encouraging. Exploration work by United Reef Petroleums Limited (now known as United Reef Limited) followed in 1965. This consisted of line cutting, geological mapping, magnetometer surveying and sampling, but no further work was done at the mine. At the time of exploration, the mine site comprised 190 ha (470 acres), consisting portions of WD271 and six staked claims.

In 1973, the Temagami Land Caution was applied by the Aboriginal community of Teme-Augama Anishnabai to protest against development on Crown land in the Temagami area. It existed throughout much of the 1970s and 1980s, prohibiting all types of mineral exploration at Big Dan and other mines in Strathy Township. As a result, the area received little attention during a gold exploration boom that occurred during the same decades. In 1991, the Supreme Court of Canada decided that the Anishnabai community no longer had aboriginal title to the land they claimed. This allowed mineral exploration in Strathy Township once again. However, Big Dan was not explored until 1993 when Falconbridge Limited performed sampling and 10.75 km (6.68 mi) of line cutting and geologic mapping in the area. The Temagami Land Caution was not entirely lifted until 1995 as a result of a court order.

== Geology ==
=== Regional terrain ===
Big Dan is situated in the Temagami Greenstone Belt, a 2,736 million year old sequence of metamorphosed igneous and sedimentary rocks that forms part of the much larger Superior craton. The belt is exposed through the Huronian Supergroup and represents an isolated southern exposure of the Abitibi Subprovince.

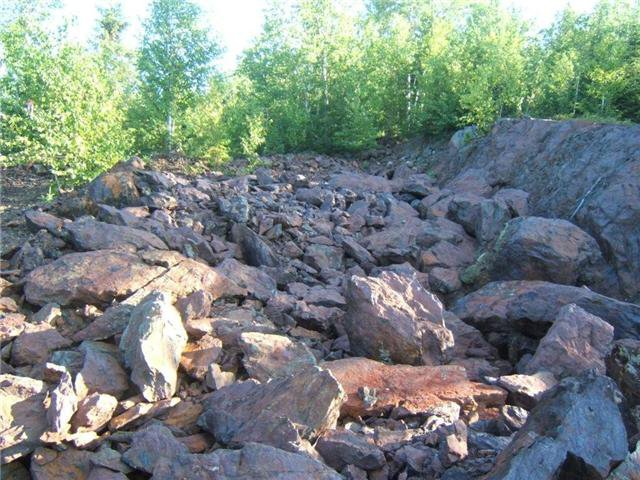
Rock waste adjacent to the adit open cut

Volcanic activity in the Temagami Greenstone Belt spanned from 2,736 to 2,687 million years ago, indicating that it was a zone of active volcanism for at least 49 million years. The Younger Volcanic Complex, a unit of the Temagami Greenstone Belt made of mostly mafic volcanic rocks, is the main volcanic complex at Big Dan. A series of intrusions penetrate the complex and three major zones of deformation have been identified, namely the Northeast Arm Deformation Zone, the Link Lake Deformation Zone and the Net Lake-Vermilion Lake Deformation Zone.

The Arsenic Lake Formation, a series of mostly dark green, iron-rich, massive and pillowed tholeiitic basalt lava flows, is the principal geologic formation at Big Dan Mine. Feldspar-phyric basalt lava flows contain tabular feldspar phenocrysts that range up to 2 cm (0.79 in) in cross section. Sills and dikes are widespread throughout the Arsenic Lake Formation and range in composition from ultramafic to felsic. At Big Dan, the Arsenic Lake Formation is overlain by a heavily wooded boreal forest. It consists of several tree species, such as cedar, alders, jackpine, spruce, birch and poplar. In some areas, however, fir is quite extensive and very thick. Swamps are extensive in areas of low ground.

=== Mineralization ===
The mineralization at Big Dan was discovered around 1900 when the area was being surveyed for the Ontario Northland Railway route. It is situated in the north-south trending Big Dan Shear Zone, a 500 m (1,600 ft) long fault shear that intersects the mine site. Here, sparse massive veinlets of arsenopyrite with minor chalcopyrite, pyrite and pyrrhotite are present. Minor traces of gold and silver ore with sporadic nickel, copper and zinc values also exist in the shear zone.

== See also ==
- List of gold mines in Canada
- List of mines in Temagami
- List of silver mines
