= Barton Mine =

Abandoned mine in Ontario, Canada

- Location in Ontario
- Location: Temagami, Ontario, Canada; 47°07′8.75″N 79°47′9.58″W
- Products: Molybdenum, gold, silver, copper, bismuth
- Production: 1,216 lb (552 kg)
- Discovered: 1906
- Opened: 1906
- Closed: 1918

Barton Mine, also known as Net Lake Mine, is an abandoned surface and underground mine in Northeastern Ontario, Canada. It is located about 0.50 km (0.31 mi) north of the Temagami Arena in Temagami North and just east of the Ontario Northland Railway in northwestern Strathy Township. Dating back to the early 1900s, it is one of the oldest mines in Temagami. Barton was the site of a fire in the early 1900s, after which it never had active mining again.

Molybdenum was the primary commodity mined at Barton. Secondary commodities included gold, silver, copper and bismuth. They were mined in a geological feature forming the surrounding landscape, which hosts several other mines in the area. Although Barton has been shut down since the early 1900s, it is still an active mineral field. However, the mine has not had any mineral exploration activity since the 1960s. It is named after J.W. Barton, who was a miner at Barton.

== History ==
=== Background ===
Barton is one of the 308 molybdenum occurrences in Ontario, as well as one of the several molybdenum mines in Ontario that had minor production during World War I. Practically all of Ontario's molybdenum production occurred during this period, mostly from hand-cobbing operations. Molybdenite, a soft metallic mineral resembling graphite, is the most common ore of molybdenum and is the only one of economic significance found in Ontario.

=== Development and exploration ===
Development was carried out from 1906 to 1918. In 1906, J.W. Barton of Gold Reef Company Limited discovered molybdenum and copper ore with gold and silver values. This led to the formation of a 15 m (49 ft) shaft with headframe, hoist and pump, several test pits and rock trenches in molybdenite showings, as well as a mining camp and boiler house. About 200 t (200 long tons; 220 short tons) of material was removed during this period. The discovery of gold is what started the original work at Barton. However, gold values proved to be low, resulting in the change to molybdenum mining. This operation was referred to as the Net Lake Molybdenite claims.

By 1911, the world had learned the commercial importance of molybdenum in strengthening steel. However, it was not widely used until World War I when molybdenum was urgently needed to manufacture guns, as well as armour plating for military machines. In 1918, near the end of World War I, J.W. Barton shipped 1,216 lb (552 kg) of hand-cobbed ore to Ottawa for recovery of 94 lb (43 kg) of molybdenum disulfide. This was followed by a fire that destroyed the camp and boiler house. Mining operations were not renewed after the disaster occurred. However, the demand for molybdenum fell drastically at the end of World War I and other molybdenum mines in Ontario were shut down. The total Ontario molybdenum production in 1918 was 47,517 lb (21,553 kg), totaling C$59,067.

In 1956, Aumo Porcupine Mines Limited did a self-potential survey for copper and nickel mineralization at Barton. This was followed by a diamond drill program in 1958 performed by S. Ciglen. In 1965–1966, Myteque Mines Limited carried out geological, electromagnetic and geomagnetic surveys, as well as extensive surface work. The mine site was withdrawn from staking in 1968 under the Mining Act.

== Geology ==
=== Regional terrain ===
Barton is situated in the Temagami Greenstone Belt. This is a 2.7 billion year old sequence of metamorphosed igneous and sedimentary rocks that forms part of the much larger Superior craton. The belt is exposed through the Huronian Supergroup and it might be an isolated southern exposure of the Abitibi Subprovince.

Volcanic activity in the Temagami Greenstone Belt spanned from 2,736 to 2,687 million years ago, indicating that it was a zone of active volcanism for at least 49 million years. The Younger Volcanic Complex, a unit of the Temagami Greenstone Belt made of mostly mafic volcanic rocks, is the main volcanic complex at Barton. A series of intrusions penetrate the complex and three major zones of deformation have been identified, namely the Northeast Arm Deformation Zone, the Link Lake Deformation Zone and the Net Lake-Vermilion Lake Deformation Zone.

The Arsenic Lake Formation, a series of mostly dark green, iron-rich, massive and pillowed tholeiitic basalt lava flows, is the principal geologic formation at Barton Mine. Feldspar-phyric basalt lava flows contain tabular feldspar phenocrysts that range up to 2 cm (0.79 in) in cross section. Sills and dikes are widespread throughout the Arsenic Lake Formation and range in composition from ultramafic to felsic.

== See also ==
- List of gold mines in Canada
- List of mines in Temagami
- List of molybdenum mines
- List of silver mines
