= Cuniptau Mines =

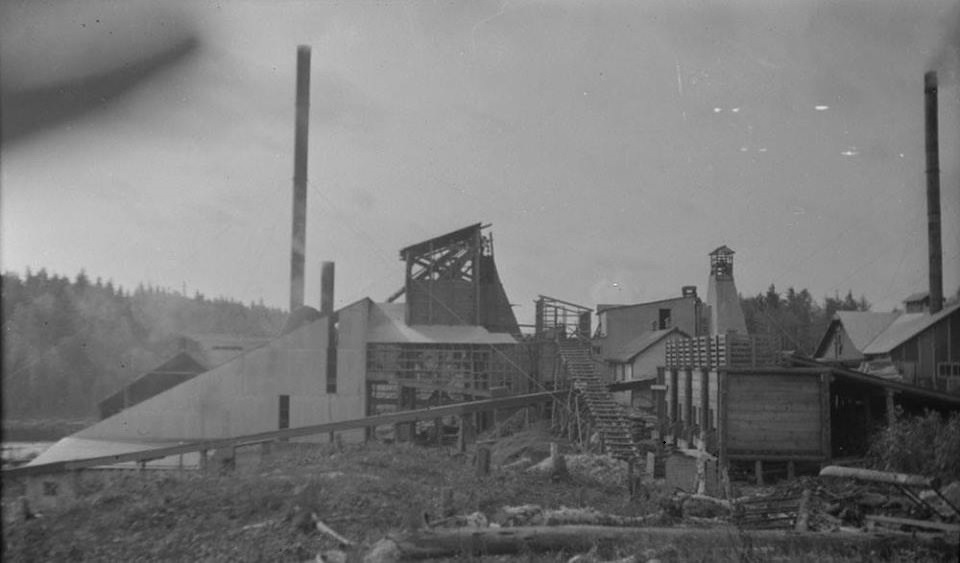
- Cuniptau Mines mill and smelter in 1936
- Industry: Mining
- Founded: 1933; 93 years ago
- Defunct: 1937; 89 years ago
- Fate: Merged
- Successor: Ontario Nickel Corporation
- Headquarters: Toronto, Ontario, Canada
- Products: Copper, nickel, platinum, gold

Cuniptau Mines (a combination of the symbols Cu, Ni, Pt and Au) was a Canadian mining company from 1933 to 1937. It was incorporated in December 1933 under the leadership of B. W. Watkins with its headquarters based in Toronto, Ontario. The company was engaged in development of the Cuniptau Mine, a polymetallic ore deposit in Strathy Township of Northeastern Ontario. In later years Cuniptau Mines also acquired the Alexo Mine property in Clergue and Dundonald townships of Cochrane District.

== History and operations ==
Development of the Cuniptau Mine began in 1933 with the sinking of a 115 ft (35 m) shaft and underground drifting on the 100 ft (30 m) shaft level. This was followed by deepening of the shaft to 240 ft (73 m), a new level established at 225 ft (69 m), drifting, crosscutting and raising in 1934. Operations in 1935 were confined mostly to surface mineral exploration. In 1936, the smelter was rebuilt to test out the possibilities of making a suitable matte from the mined ore. High-grade quartz vein material from the Cuniptau Silica Deposit in Best Township was used as flux for the ore smelting. Development of the Cuniptau Mine in 1936 consisted of underground drifting, crosscutting and raising, with exploration confined to surface and underground diamond drilling. The mine office was stationed at Goward, a locality now in the municipality of Temagami.

Cuniptau Mines reopened the Alexo Mine near Porquis Junction in 1936. Operations at this mining property during the year consisted of partial mine dewatering and sampling. The company shipped two cars of ore from Alexo to the Cuniptau Mine to increase the nickel content of the material being smelted.

On January 10, 1937, the shareholders of Cuniptau Mines ratified a proposal to merge the company with the newly formed Ontario Nickel Corporation; Ontario Nickel acquired the Cuniptau and Alexo mines in 1937 from this merge.

== See also ==
- List of mining companies
- List of mines in Temagami
