= Big Dan =

Big Dan may refer to:

- Big Dan (film), a 1923 film directed by William A. Wellman
- Big Dan Mine, an abandoned mine in Temagami, Ontario, Canada
- Big Dan Shear Zone, a geological feature in Temagami, Ontario, Canada
- Dan O'Connor (prospector), a Canadian businessman and prospector
- Dan Shanahan, an Irish sportsperson
- Dan Brouthers, an American baseball player
