= Johnny Creek =

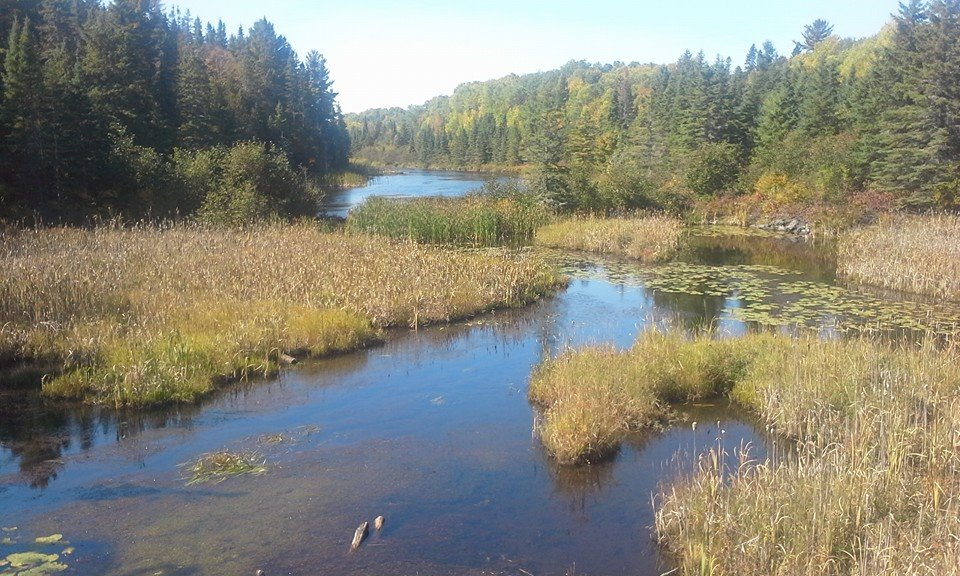
- Johnny Creek on west side of Highway 11

- Location of the mouth of Johnny Creek in Ontario

Location
- Country: Canada
- Province: Ontario
- Region: Northeastern Ontario
- District: Nipissing
- Municipality: Temagami

Physical characteristics
- Source: Link Lake
  - location: Strathy Township
  - coordinates: 47°6′24″N 79°46′40″W
  - elevation: 300 m (980 ft)
- Mouth: Net Lake
  - location: Strathy Township
  - coordinates: 47°4′37″N 79°47′58″W
  - elevation: 300 m (980 ft)
- Length: 4 km (2.5 mi)

Basin features
- River system: Ottawa River drainage basin

Johnny Creek is one of many creeks running through the Temagami region of Northeastern Ontario, Canada. It is located about 4 km (2.5 mi) south of Temagami North in southeastern Strathy Township. The creek is entirely within the municipality of Temagami, flowing in a west–east direction.

== Course and hydrology ==
Johnny Creek flows east from the east end of Link Lake and runs under the Highway 11 Johnny Creek Bridge about 0.57 km (0.35 mi) to the east. It then flows adjacent to the Sherman Mine branch line for 1.5 km (0.93 mi), eventually running under the Ontario Northland Railway main line where it flows another 1.5 km (0.93 mi) into Boot Bay of Net Lake. The total length of the creek is about 4 km (2.5 mi) and has an elevation of 300 m (980 ft).

Johnny Creek is part of the Ottawa River drainage basin, a large area covering much of eastern Ontario and western Quebec where water drains into the Ottawa River. After Johnny Creek flows into Net Lake, the water drains through Net Creek, entering Cassels Lake. It then enters Rabbit Lake, which is drained by the Matabitchuan River. The Matabitchuan River then flows into Lake Timiskaming where the water eventually enters the Ottawa River.

== Geology ==
The floodplain of Johnny Creek is in a low lying trend associated with the Link Lake Deformation Zone. This zone of deformation is at least 0.5 km (0.31 mi) wide and over 3 km (1.9 mi) long, extending from Link Lake in the west to east of Highway 11. Several small shear zones paralleling the Johnny Creek floodplain are probably related to the Link Lake Deformation Zone. A diorite dike, thought to have been associated with volcanic activity, is crosscut by these minor shear zones. This indicates that the dike intruded into the surrounding country rock at least prior to the latest reactivation of the Link Lake Deformation Zone. However, the amount of displacement along the deformation zone is unknown.

== See also ==
- List of rivers of Ontario
