= Northeast Arm Iron Range =

Area of iron ore in Nipissing District of Northeastern Ontario, Canada

- Stratigraphic range: Neoarchean, 2,700 Ma
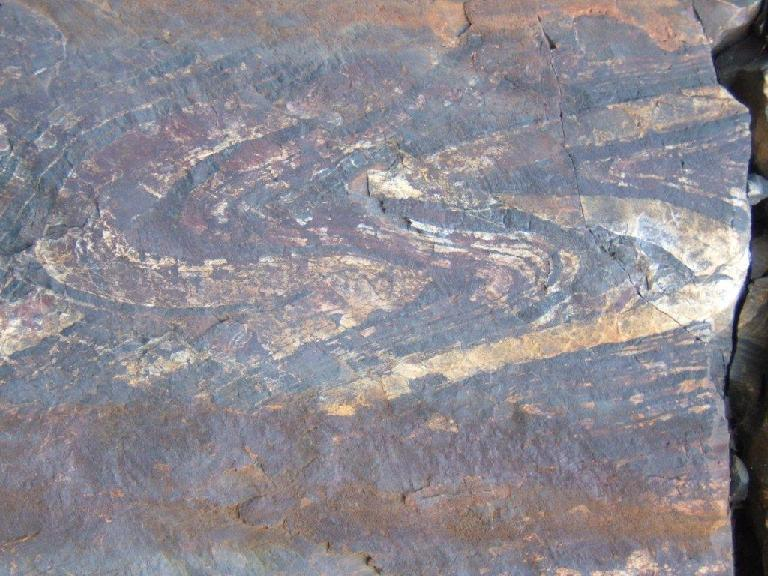
- Folded iron formation of the Northeast Arm Iron Range exposed along Highway 11
- Type: Geological formation
- Unit of: Temagami Greenstone Belt
- Thickness: Up to 80 metres (260 ft)

Lithology
- Primary: Chert, jasper, magnetite
- Other: Hematite, pyrite, tuff

Location
- Coordinates: 47°3′24.9″N 79°50′48.62″W
- Region: Ontario
- Country: Canada

Type section
- Named for: Northeast Arm of Lake Temagami

The Northeast Arm Iron Range, also called the Temagami Iron Range, is an elongated area of iron ore in Nipissing District of Northeastern Ontario, Canada. It parallels the western side of Lake Temagami's Northeast Arm near the village of Temagami at its northern end. One of many small iron ranges in the Temagami area, the Northeast Arm Range consists of alternating bands of iron-rich and iron-poor sediments. It was discovered in the 1890s and has since seen sporadic mining and mineral exploration activities.

== Geology ==
The Northeast Arm Iron Range is part of the Temagami Greenstone Belt which occurs on the southern margin of the Abitibi Subprovince. It consists primarily of a banded iron formation that was deposited in an Algoma type volcanic setting 2.7 billion years ago. The iron and silica mineralization comprising this feature was directly derived from hydrothermal venting associated with major island arc volcanic centres in a Neoarchean ocean. The lack of hydrothermal sulfur indicates that there was little to no plume fallout from adjacent black smoker style venting. It also raises the possibility that the iron and silica originated from distal rather than proximal hydrothermal sources. Ultramafic lithologies required to generate high-pH fluids are not present, suggesting that chert and iron oxide deposition was unlikely to have been controlled by pH fluctuations of alkaline hydrothermal fluids mixing with seawater. After deposition, the sediments were subsequently compressed, deformed and uplifted to form the present-day banded iron formation. Possible soft-sediment deformation is represented by a series of intricate folds exposed in the Highway 11 cross-section.

This banded iron formation has a length of 8 km (5.0 mi) and a width ranging from 53 to 152 m (170 to 500 ft). It starts west of the north end of Snake Island Lake, cuts across Highway 11, passes beneath the waters of Turtle Lake and ends in a swamp about 280 m (920 ft) from the Tetapaga River. The stratigraphic thickness averages about 60 m (200 ft), consisting mainly of an interbedded sequence of chert, jasper and magnetite with smaller proportions of hematite, pyrite and volcanic tuff; this suggests that volcanic eruptions were simultaneous with deposition of the banded iron formation. The interbedded tuffs range in thickness from 0.15 cm (0.06 in) to more than 5 cm (2.0 in).

== History ==
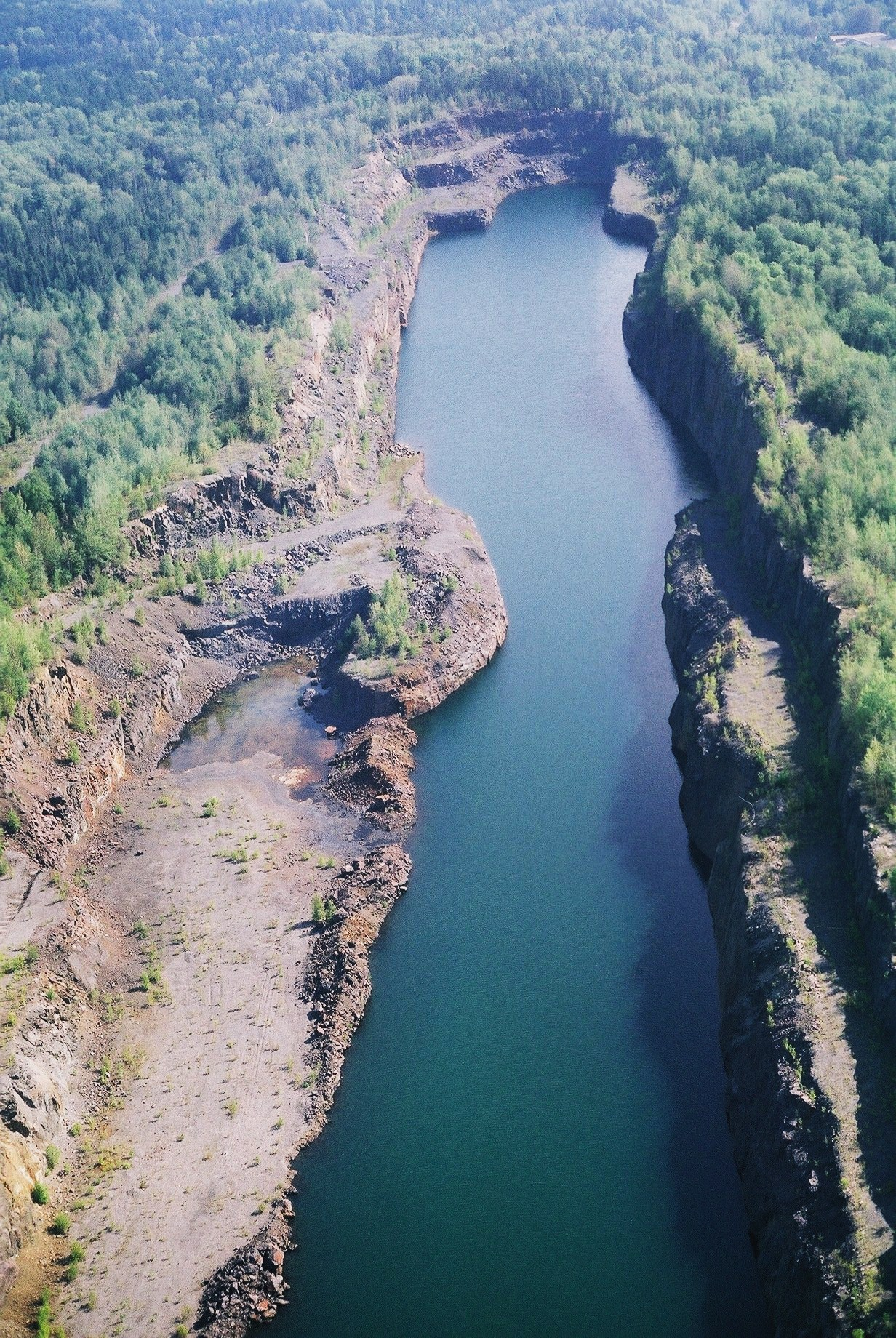
The East Pit of Sherman Mine was quarried at the eastern extent of the Northeast Arm Iron Range

Iron-bearing rocks were noted near the west end of Turtle Lake in 1888 while topographical work and geological reconnaissance was being done adjacent to Temagami. The full importance of this discovery was not recognized until around 1899 when the rocks were revealed to be outcrops of a much larger iron formation. Much of the credit for tracing out this structure was given to Dan O'Connor who would become a well-known prospector engaging in local mining and prospecting. Two ore samples grading 42.89% and 38.94% iron were obtained by O'Connor in 1902 for mineral processing tests, the results of which showed that it was possible to produce a concentrate from this deposit.

The Northeast Arm Range would prove to be one of the most promising iron ranges in the Temagami area by 1904, not only because of its extent and geological association but also because of its proximity to the projected Ontario Northland Railway. Its economic importance was earnestly and persistently advocated by O'Connor which was one of the most powerful factors in directing public attention to it. This was especially true for T. B. Caldwell of Lanark who held an iron mine near Calabogie, Ontario. Caldwell engaged in exploratory work of the Northeast Arm Iron Range in 1905 which involved diamond drilling, trenching and cross-cutting of the ore body. The work was in charge of A. B. Willmott of Sault Ste. Marie.

Open-pit mining in the Northeast Arm Iron Range commenced with the opening of Sherman Mine in 1968. This operation was a joint venture between Dofasco and the Tetapaga Mining Company, the latter of which was a wholly owned subsidiary of the Cleveland-Cliffs Iron Company. Sherman consisted of four main open pits: East Pit and South Pit in the Northeast Arm Iron Range and North Pit and West Pit in the parallel Vermilion Range. They were developed around a central concentrating and pelletizing plant that carried iron ore pellets by conveyor belt to an automatic load-out silo above the mine railway spur. The pellets were then loaded into covered ore cars which in turn were taken to the Dofasco plants in Hamilton, Ontario, via the Ontario Northland and Canadian National railways for making pig iron and steel. This operation continued until 1990 when the mine ceased production.

The presence of potentially economic gold concentrations in the Sherman Mine tailings has made the associated iron ranges exploration targets for potential banded iron formation-hosted gold deposits. This was the subject of a 2014 report for Temagami Gold Inc., a mineral exploration company focused on discovering gold and copper-nickel-PGE deposits in the Temagami area.

== See also ==
- Tetapaga Syncline
- Kokoko Iron Range
- Northeast Arm Deformation Zone
