= Temagami Occurrence =

Mine in Ontario, Canada

- Location in Ontario
- Location: Temagami, Ontario, Canada; 47°05′29.9″N 79°50′16.25″W

The Temagami Occurrence is a geological occurrence in Northeastern Ontario, Canada. It is located near the southern end of Kanichee Lake in west-central Strathy Township. It is named after Temagami, the municipality in which the occurrence is located in.

Gold and silver are the occurrence's primary commodities, while arsenic, zinc and copper are secondary commodities. Felsic metavolcanic rocks and mafic intrusive rocks are cut by silicified zones and veins. A zone of diorite with a maximum width of 0.75 m (2.5 ft) has been assayed to have up to 0.34 oz (9.6 g) of gold per ton. A sulfide-rich vein has been assayed to have 1.72 oz (49 g) of gold per ton and 14.80 oz (420 g) of silver per ton. Trenches, open pits and stripped areas are present in the Temagami Occurrence from past mining operations.

== See also ==
- List of gold mines in Canada
- List of mines in Temagami
- List of silver mines
