= The Dans =

The Dans may refer to:

- A fictional gang that appeared in the Beano comic strip Karate Sid from 1987 to 1988
- A collective term for the Big Dan and Little Dan mines in Temagami, Ontario, Canada

== See also ==
- Dans, given name and surname
