= Norrie Mine =

Abandoned mine in Ontario, Canada

- Location in Ontario
- Location: Temagami, Ontario, Canada; 47°07′00″N 79°46′27″W
- Products: Copper, nickel, lead, gold, zinc, silver

Norrie Mine is an abandoned surface mine in Northeastern Ontario, Canada. It is located about 1 km (0.62 mi) northeast of Temagami North on the eastern shore of Net Lake in eastern Strathy Township. It is named after L. B. Norrie of New York, who first claimed the mine site.

Development was carried out prior to 1920 with the construction of 10 open pits and a number of diamond drill holes. The primary commodities mined at Norrie were copper and nickel. Secondary commodities included lead, gold, zinc and silver. In 1941, 69 m (226 ft) of diamond drilling was completed under the supervision of R. A. Percy. Picked samples from waste rock dumps were said to contain copper and low nickel values. Sampling in 2005 assayed 0.15% nickel and 3.5% copper.

== See also ==
- List of mines in Temagami
