= Sherman volcano =

The Sherman volcano is a possible prehistoric volcano in the municipality of Temagami in Northeastern Ontario, Canada. Geological evidence indicates that it was located west of the abandoned Sherman Mine and lies in the Archean Temagami Greenstone Belt.

== Evidence ==
A number of volcanic features have been found that suggests the volcano was located west of Sherman Mine. At least two outcrops of felsic lava flows exist between Turtle Lake and Link Lake, the largest of which indicates that its volcanic vent existed at the western end of Link Lake. The existence of facies changes and remnants of lava movement exposed in the wedge of the Turtle Lake Formation are likely further indications that the volcano was located west of Link Lake. Also, jagged felsic tuffs exist in feldspar-phyric pyroclastic deposits exposed in the Sherman Mine area.

== See also ==
- List of volcanoes of Canada
- Volcanology of Eastern Canada
