= Strathy Township =

Geographic township in Ontario, Canada

Coordinates: 47°05′40″N 79°49′08″W

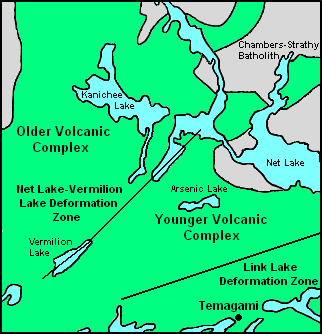
A map of Strathy Township displaying some of its geographic and geologic features.

Strathy Township is a square-shaped geographic township comprising a portion of the municipality of Temagami in Northeastern Ontario, Canada. It is used for geographic purposes, such as land surveying and natural resource explorations. At least four other geographic townships surround Strathy Township, namely Best Township, Cassels Township, Strathcona Township and Chambers Township.

== Features and localities ==
- Arsenic Lake
- Beanland Mine
- Big Dan Mine
- Big Dan Shear Zone
- Caribou Lake
- Caribou Mountain
- Chambers-Strathy Batholith
- Hermiston-McCauley Mine
- Johnny Creek
- Kanichee layered intrusive complex
- Kanichee Mine
- Lake Temagami
- Leckie Mine
- Link Lake
- Link Lake Deformation Zone
- Milne-Sherman Road
- Milne Townsite
- Net Lake
- Net Lake-Vermilion Lake Deformation Zone
- Sherman Mine
- Sherman volcano
- Snake Island Lake
- Temagami
- Temagami North
- Temagami Greenstone Belt
- Temagami Water Aerodrome
- Turtle Lake
