= Kanichee Mine =

Mine in Ontario, Canada

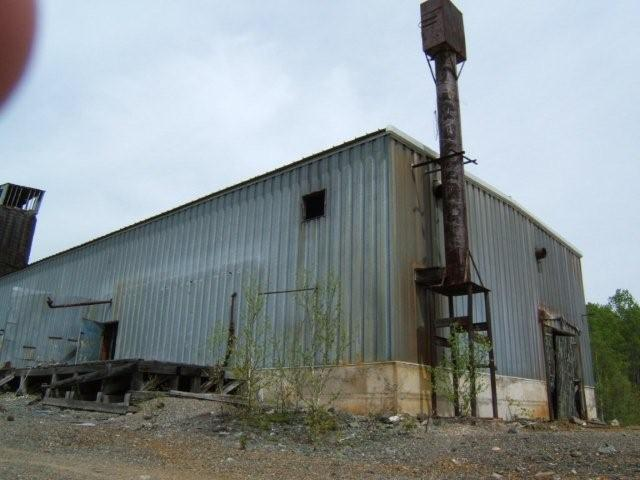
- One of the several buildings at the Kanichee Mine.

- Location in Ontario
- Location: Temagami, Ontario, Canada; 47°06′14″N 79°50′44″W
- Products: Copper and nickel with gold, silver and platinum group credits
- Production: 4.2 million pounds
- Opened: 1933, 1973
- Closed: 1937, 1976
- Company: Progenitor Metals Corp.

The Kanichee Mine, also less commonly known as the Ajax Mine, is an abandoned base metal and precious metal mine, located in the Temagami region of northeastern Ontario, Canada. It is near the small unincorporated community of Temagami North, accessed by the Kanichee Mine Road from Highway 11. The Kanichee Mine zone has been explored and mined discontinuously from as early as 1910. During the 20th century, it operated and closed down at least three times, with the most recent being from 1973 to 1976. To date, the discontinuous operation of Kanichee Mine has produced 4.2 million pounds of metal.

The Kanichee area is associated with an igneous intrusion that has been termed the Kanichee layered intrusive complex. This roughly oval-shaped intrusive complex is part of a volcanic belt characterized by felsic and mafic metavolcanic rocks called the Temagami Greenstone Belt. Kanichee is one of the three most notable mines in the volcanic belt, others include the Sherman Mine in Chambers and Strathy townships and the Copperfields Mine on Temagami Island in Lake Temagami.

== Geology ==
=== Mineralogy and history ===
Exploration work was done in the area prior to 1920 with the construction of trenches and two shafts. Between 1933 and 1936, Cuniptau Mines Limited sank a 75 m (246 ft) shaft and installed a pilot smelter. Production amounted to 44,975.6 kilograms of copper, 29,641.6 kilograms of nickel, and relatively small amounts of gold, silver, platinum and palladium. The deposit was later investigated by Ontario Nickel Corporation Limited from 1937 to 1948 then by Trebor Mines Limited from 1948 to 1949. Kanichee Mining Incorporated worked the property from an open pit to excavate both disseminated and vein ore to a depth of nearly 35 m (115 ft) from 1973 to 1976, and no mining operations have begun since then. Remnants of this open pit includes a small lake with gravel roads adjacent to and entering the lake and steep cliffs surrounding the lake from rock blasting. The total production at Kanichee Mine is 3 million pounds of copper and 1.2 million pounds of nickel with gold, silver and platinum group credits.

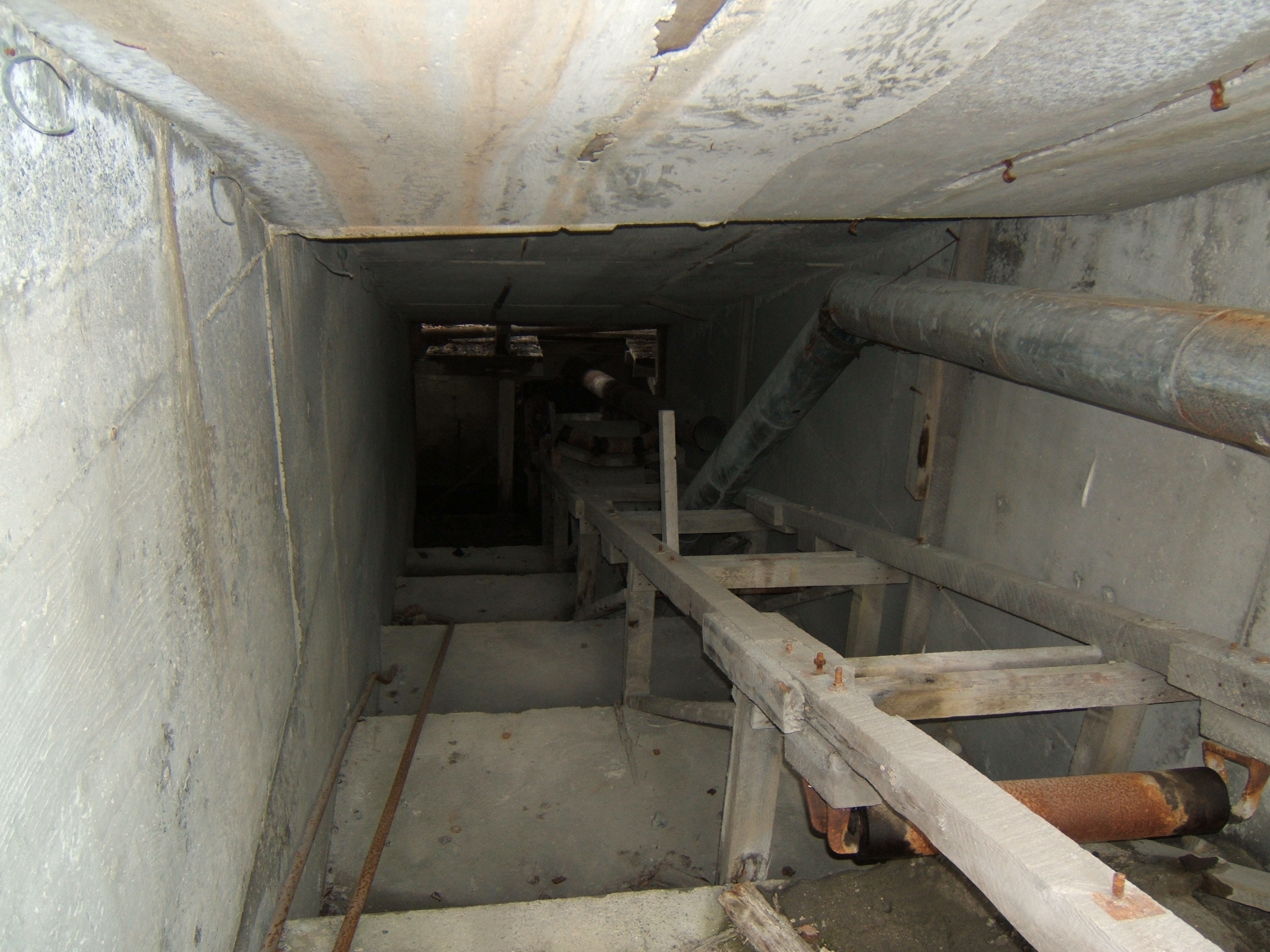
An old conveyor belt in a cement tunnel.

The main minerals found at Kanichee Mine include pyrite, pyrrhotite and chalcopyrite, occurring as semi-massive to massive veins. Considerable gold, silver, platinum and palladium occur with the sulfides.

=== Kanichee layered intrusive complex ===
The Precambrian oval-shaped Kanichee layered intrusive complex is the largest of many sill-like mafic-ultramafic bodies in felsic and mafic metavolcanic rocks in the northern portion of the Temagami greenstone belt. It comprises five magmatic series, each of which contains one or more types of igneous rock. A succession of cumulus phases comprising every magmatic series suggests that the Kanichee layered intrusive complex is south-facing, including the surrounding metavolcanic lava flows. This record indicates that magmatic rocks of the Kanichee layered intrusive complex originally formed in a level position and most likely very shallow beneath the Earth's crust.

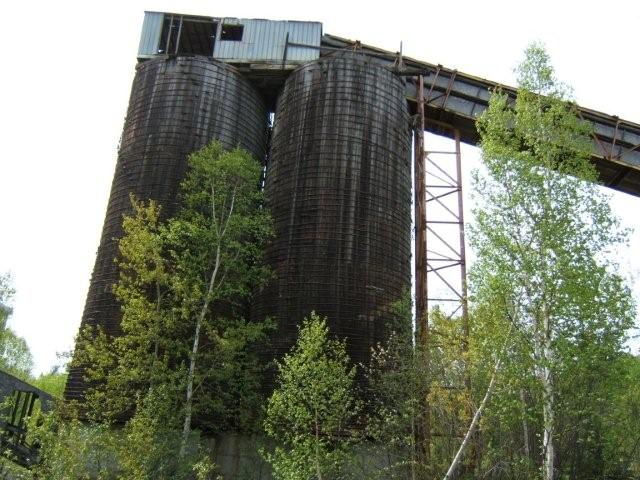
A silo-like building at Kanichee Mine.

All five magmatic series comprising the Kanichee layered intrusive complex were formed by individual pulses of molten rock. An accurate estimate of the makeup of each pulse is not known because well-defined examples of chilled margins have not been detected. Numerous pulses of magmatic intrusions, each of which might have led to a volcanic eruption, are required to explain the cyclic nature of the Kanichee layered intrusive complex. In the lower four magmatic series, masses of chromite, olivine and clinopyroxene develop rocks varying from dunite to clinopyroxenite. The fifth magmatic series comprise a similar suite of ultramafic rocks overlapped by olivine and quartz gabbros in which plagioclase, clinopyroxene and an iron–titanium oxide phase are the dominant minerals. The first magmatic series comprised the nickel-copper-PGE ore in which the Kanichee Mine extracted. The comparison in mineralogy and chemistry of the ultramafic rocks of the five magmatic series indicates that every magmatic series was developed by magma of similar composition. A lens-shaped area of quartz gabbro remains directly south of the main portion of the intrusive complex. However, it is not clear whether it has a separate magmatic origin from the olivine gabbros found in the Kanichee layered intrusive complex. The ore zone rocks from the first magmatic series clearly have connections with adjacent metavolcanic rocks of the Temagami greenstone belt.

== Kanichee Mine and the future ==
The future of the Kanichee Mine remains uncertain, as all mines in the Temagami area continue to be abandoned. The last mine to operate in the Temagami area was the iron bearing Sherman Mine until its closing in 1990 and Kanichee's discontinuous history of mining and exploring throughout the 20th century has left the area abandoned for decades. However, a geologic project is expected to be evaluated for potential sampling at new Kanichee deposits in 2009, sparking a possibility for renewed mining operations. Other samplings associated with this project include new deposits or occurrences in the Golden Chalice, McWatters and Langmuir areas.

== See also ==
- List of mines in Temagami
- Volcanism of Canada
- Volcanism of Eastern Canada
