= List of mines in Temagami =

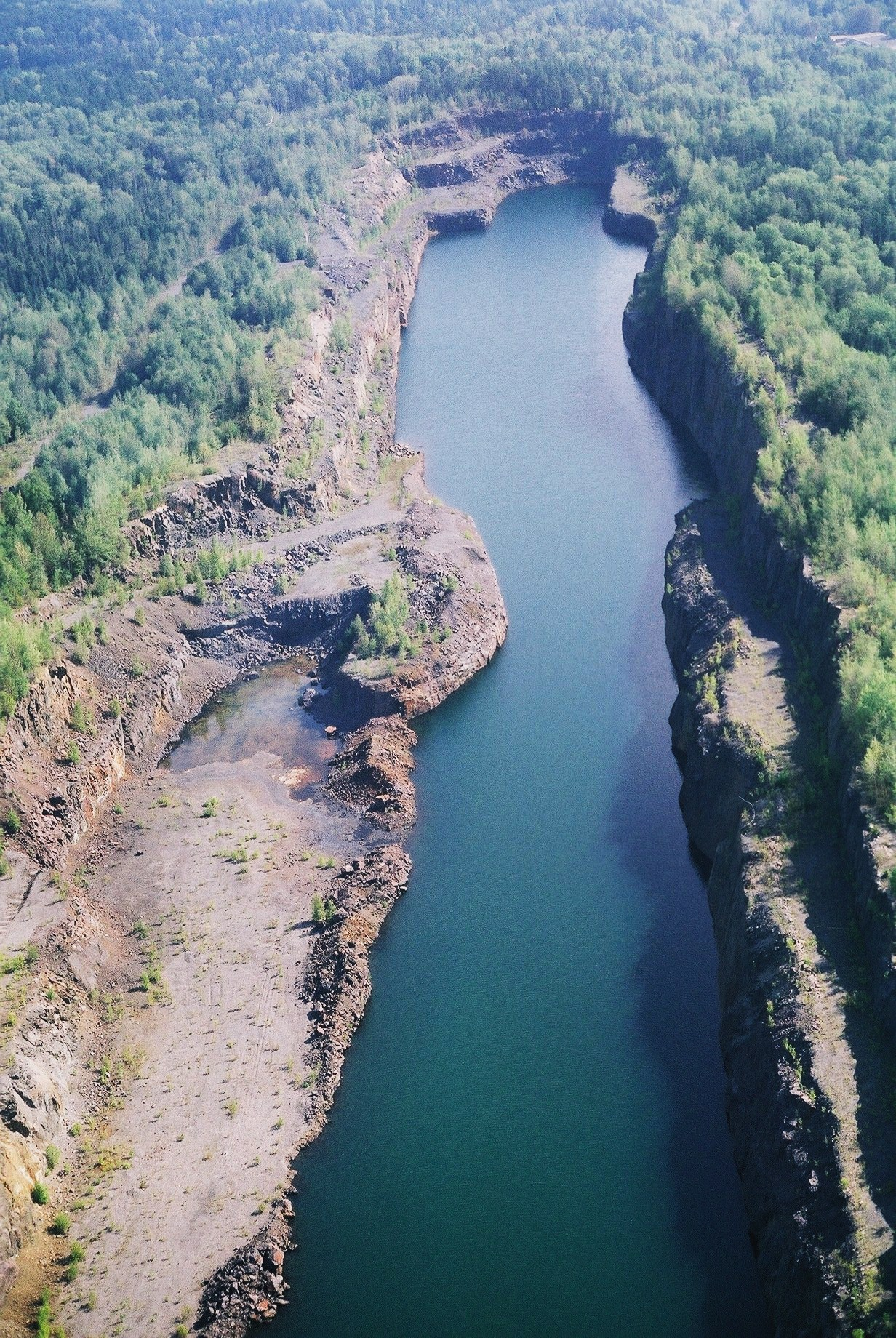
An aerial view of the East Pit of Sherman Mine

This is a list of mines in Temagami, a municipality in the northern part of Nipissing District in Northeastern Ontario, Canada. Also included are their alias names, coordinates, workings and the commodities that were mined there. The list contains 32 mines, both surface and underground. They are located in 12 geographic townships, with Strathy Township having the largest mine capacity.

Mining is a significant part of Temagami's history. The municipality was the scene of active prospecting and mining ventures throughout most of the 20th century, resulting in the creation of trenches, open cuts, open pits, adits, shafts and drifts in the regional bedrock. Commodities extracted from these mines included iron, copper, nickel, gold, arsenic, molybdenum, platinum, palladium, lead, silver, cobalt, zinc, bismuth, uranium, graphite and pyrite.

The mines of Temagami are situated in a variety of geological formations. This includes the Nipissing diabase and Temagami greenstone belt, which hosts a variety of mineral deposits. Mining in these two geological features began in the early 1900s with the discovery of precious metals, such as gold and silver.

== Strathy Township ==
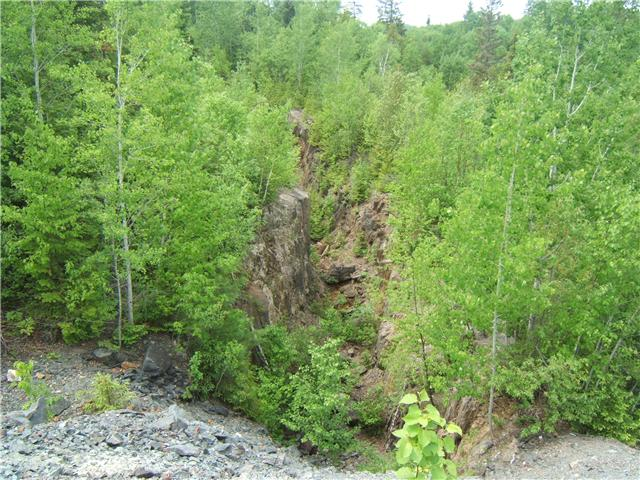
Forested open pit of Beanland Mine

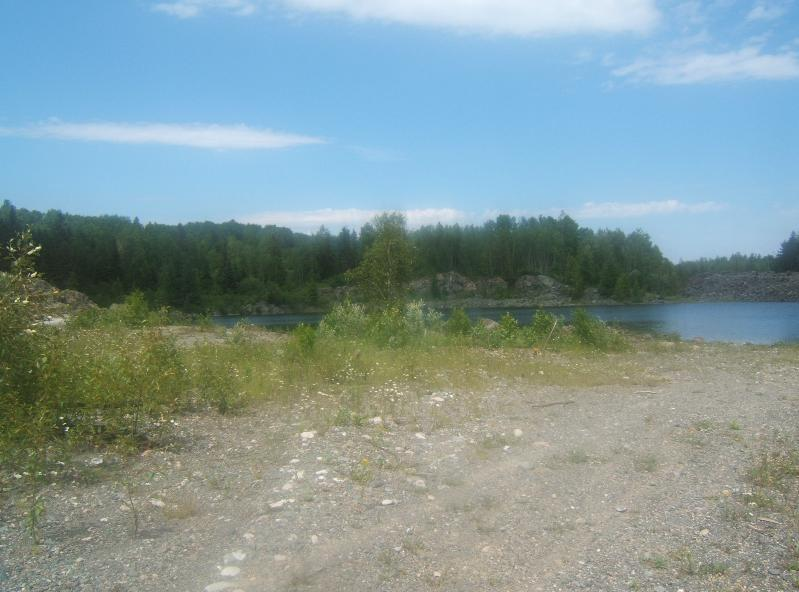
Open pit of Kanichee Mine

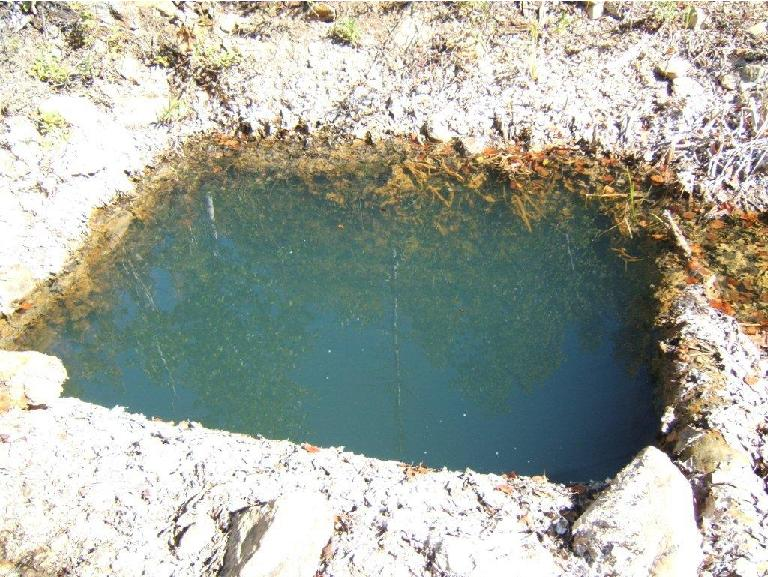
The flooded Penrose shaft of Manitoba and Eastern Mine

Official name	Alias names	Coordinates	Primary commodities	Secondary commodities	Workings
Ajax	Cuniptau; Kanichee; Trebor	47°6′13.7″N 79°50′38.63″W	Copper, nickel	Gold, platinum, palladium, silver	Open pit; drifts
Beanland	A.E. Perron	47°5′28.71″N 79°49′30.83″W	Gold, silver	No data	Vertical shaft; drifts; open pit
Big Dan	United Reef Petroleum	47°5′30.62″N 79°46′28.17″W	Gold, silver	Arsenic	Open cut; trench; adit; vertical and inclined shafts
Canada-Thomas	No data	47°5′59.58″N 79°48′20.12″W	Copper, gold	Cobalt, lead, nickel, silver, zinc	Open pit; trenches; stripped areas
Hermiston-McCauley	Shaver Vein; Cominco South Vein	47°5′54.2″N 79°49′38.29″W	Gold	No data	Shaft; open pit; trenches
J.W. Barton	Net Lake	47°7′8.75″N 79°47′9.58″W	Molybdenum	Bismuth, copper, gold, silver	Vertical and inclined shafts; trenches; open pit
L.B. Norrie	No data	47°6′59.59″N 79°46′27.63″W	Copper, nickel	Gold, lead, silver, zinc	Trenches; open pit
Manitoba and Eastern	Leckie; Little Dan; Penrose	47°5′36.34″N 79°47′48.68″W	Gold	Arsenic, copper, silver	Open cut; open pit; trenches; shafts; drifts; stripped area
Oslund-Hurst	Keevil	47°4′57.77″N 79°50′46.34″W	Gold	Silver	Open pits; trenches
Sey-Bert	J.A. Jones	47°5′47.82″N 79°47′15.83″W	Gold	Lead, zinc	Trenches
Sherman	East Pit; North Pit; South Pit; West Pit	47°4′14.48″N 79°51′59.83″W	Iron	No data	Open pits
Temagami	No data	47°5′29.9″N 79°50′16.25″W	Gold, silver	Arsenic, copper, zinc	Trenches; open pits; stripped areas

== Best Township ==
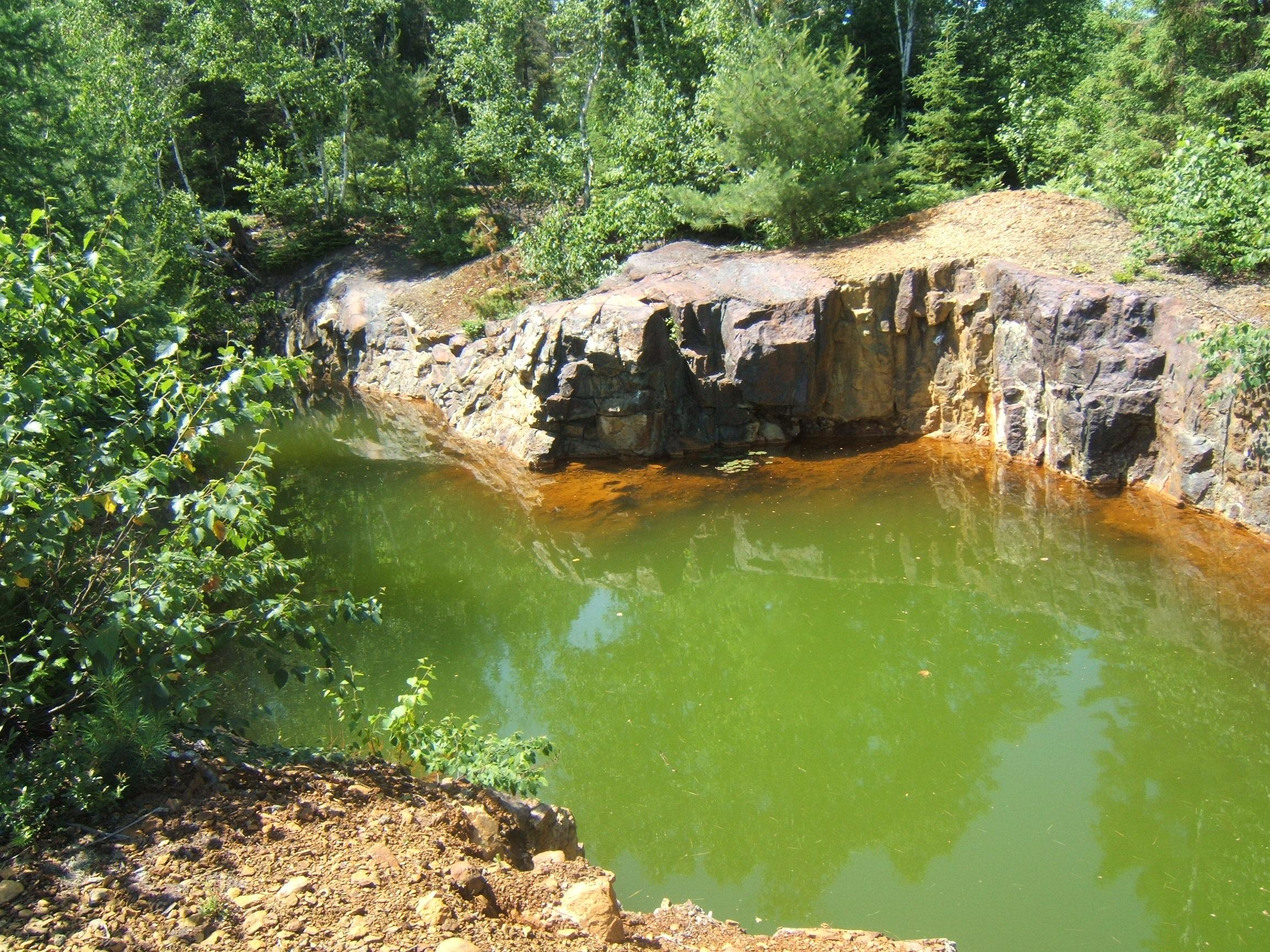
Trench at the Northland Pyrite Mine

Official name	Alias names	Coordinates	Primary commodities	Secondary commodities	Workings
Acana East	Dunmor; Granite Lake; Niemetz-Dunlop	47°10′5.24″N 79°43′54.43″W	Copper, nickel	Lead, zinc	Vertical shaft; stripped area; trenches
Danlou	Mortimer	47°9′8.44″N 79°44′32.79″W	Gold	Copper, silver	Vertical shaft; trenches
Friday Creek	No data	47°9′36.24″N 79°38′19.43″W	Silver	Copper	Trench
Northland Pyrite	Harris; James Lake; Rib Lake	47°10′26.24″N 79°44′34.45″W	Sulfur/pyrite	Cobalt, copper, gold, nickel, zinc	Vertical shaft; open pits; trench
Wkt	No data	47°10′19.24″N 79°42′2.44″W	Cobalt	Lead, silver	Trenches

== Belfast Township ==
Official name	Alias names	Coordinates	Primary commodities	Secondary commodities	Workings
Obabika	No data	47°0′43.38″N 80°11′41.48″W	Copper	Gold	Trenches
Obabika Inlet Showing	No data	47°2′39.32″N 80°12′30.4″W	Copper	No data	No data
Ne. Belfast Silver Occurrence	No data	47°3′23.85″N 80°10′33.59″W	Silver	Copper	Trench

== Cassels Township ==
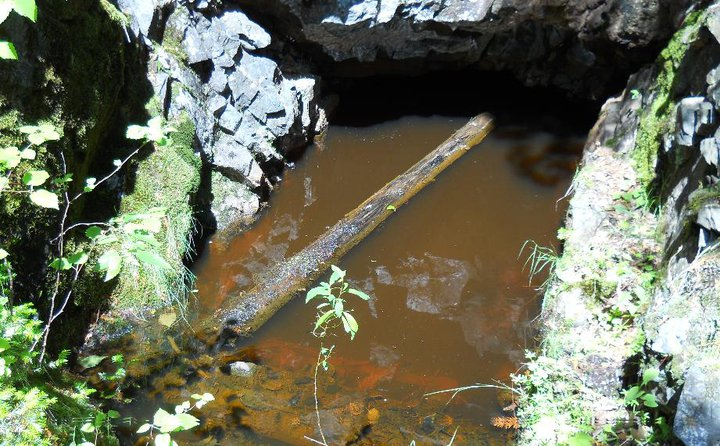
Flooded shaft at Gosselin Mine

Mining in Cassels Township dates from 1900 when the area was being explored for silver and cobalt. This work was carried out by Temagami-Lorrain Mining Limited in the Sauvé Lake area and Temagami-Cobalt Mining Company Limited in the Gosselin Lake area. Trenches and shafts were constructed in Nipissing diabase along with rock stripping. In 1946, Hermes Mines Limited created pits in a 0.61 to 0.91 m (2.0 to 3.0 ft) wide fault zone containing minor pyrite and very minor chalcopyrite mineralization. This work was in the Outlet Bay area of Net Lake.

Official name	Alias names	Coordinates	Primary commodities	Secondary commodities	Workings
Brochu	Hermes (Pits)	47°5′30.92″N 79°44′4.34″W	Copper	No data	Open pit; trenches
Gosselin	Aldage	47°5′20.58″N 79°41′48.59″W	Copper, silver	Cobalt, gold, nickel	Open pit; shaft; adit; trench
Temagami-Lorrain	No data	47°6′39.79″N 79°40′58.2″W	Cobalt, gold	Arsenic, copper, nickel, silver	Open pits; shaft; trenches

== Vogt Township ==
Official name	Alias names	Coordinates	Primary commodities	Secondary commodities	Workings
Island Number 364	Aubay Prospect; Niemetz Property	46°49′53.18″N 80°6′43.45″W	Iron, uranium	Copper	Trench
Krefeld	Austin Bay	46°49′51.18″N 80°3′53.43″W	Iron, gold	Copper, graphite	Trenches
Prosco	Aubay; D'Eldona; Wright	46°48′52.18″N 80°5′35.43″W	Gold, uranium	No data	Trenches

== Phyllis Township ==
Official name	Alias names	Coordinates	Primary commodities	Secondary commodities	Workings
Temagami	Temagami; Copperfields	46°57′44.41″N 80°2′13.67″W	Copper	Cobalt, gold, nickel, palladium, platinum, silver	Vertical shaft; open pits
Billfield	Billfield	46°57′47″N 80°0′49.83″W	Gold	Silver	Trench

== Clement Township ==
Official name	Alias names	Coordinates	Primary commodities	Secondary commodities	Workings
Halkin	Savard Occurrence; Bradex Mines Showing	46°52′25.96″N 80°10′43.44″W	Copper	Silver, gold	No data

== Cynthia Township ==
Official name	Alias names	Coordinates	Primary commodities	Secondary commodities	Workings
Coppersand	A. Hardie; Derosier	47°8′31.45″N 80°4′11.45″W	Copper, gold, silver	Cobalt, lead, nickel	Trenches

== Joan Township ==
Official name	Alias names	Coordinates	Primary commodities	Secondary commodities	Workings
Lahay	Lahay	47°0′46.38″N 80°5′43.5″W	Copper, gold	No data	Vertical shaft; trench

== Scholes Township ==
Official name	Alias names	Coordinates	Primary commodities	Secondary commodities	Workings
Cummings Lake	Eagle Rock Iron Mines Ltd.	46°57′32.24″N 80°12′42.5″W	Iron	No data	Vertical shaft

== Strathcona Township ==
Official name	Alias names	Coordinates	Primary commodities	Secondary commodities	Workings
O'Connor	Milestone	47°02′27.77″N 79°49′51″W	Copper, nickel, sulfur/pyrite	Gold, zinc	Open pits; trench

== Torrington Township ==
Official name	Alias names	Coordinates	Primary commodities	Secondary commodities	Workings
Cross Lake	Priest Mine	46°51′57.02″N 79°57′57.49″W	Copper, lead	Gold, silver	Inclined shaft; trench

== See also ==
- List of mines in Ontario
