= Hermiston-McCauley Mine =

Abandoned mine in Ontario, Canada

- Location in Ontario
- Location: Temagami, Ontario, Canada; 47°05′54.30″N 79°49′38.18″W
- Products: Gold
- Opened: 1936
- Closed: 1938

Hermiston-McCauley Mine is a large abandoned underground gold mine in Strathy Township of Temagami, Northeastern Ontario, Canada. It is located between the southwestern arm of Net Lake and the south arm of Kanichee Lake.

== History ==
Hermiston-McCauley was the subject of quartz reef mining. From 1936 to 1938, a 115.1 m (378 ft) three compartment mine shaft was created. Three levels were created, two of which had 1,853.1 m (6,080 ft) of lateral work.

== Geology ==
Hermiston-McCauley Mine is on the northwestern side of the Net Lake-Vermilion Lake Deformation Zone. This is a northeast–southwest trending high strain zone that separates rocks of the Older and Younger volcanic complexes, which in turn comprise the Temagami Greenstone Belt.

Reserves at Hermiston-McCauley have been variously estimated at 31,000 tons averaging 0.275 oz (7.8 g) of gold per ton, 45,700 tons averaging 0.30 oz (8.5 g) of gold per ton over 1 m (3.3 ft), or 9,000 tons averaging 0.5 oz (14 g) of gold per ton over 0.91 m (3.0 ft). A main and subsidiary quartz-rich zone occur in a ruptured diorite intrusion, which intrudes felsic volcanic rocks in a northwesterly direction with the strike of the Net Lake-Vermilion Lake Deformation Zone. The main quartz vein is at least 76.1 m (250 ft) long and up to 1.5 m (4.9 ft) wide. Pyrite with chalcopyrite and gold occupies quartz veins as blebs and small veins.

== See also ==
- List of mines in Temagami
