= Dan O'Connor (prospector) =

Canadian businessman (1864–1933)

Daniel O'Connor
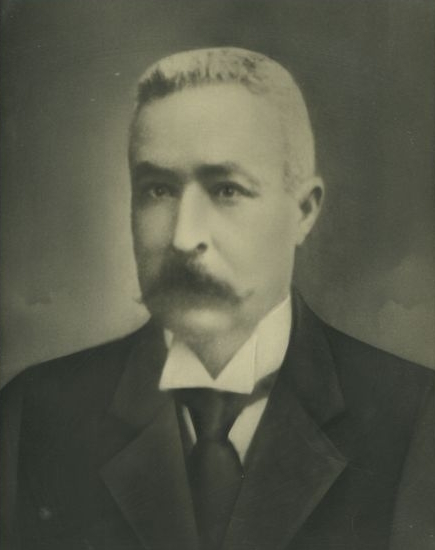
- O'Connor, c. 1894

Mayor of Sudbury, Ontario
- In office January 1894 – December 1894
- Preceded by: Stephen Fournier
- Succeeded by: Murray Biggar

Personal details
- Born: January 31, 1864 Pembroke, Canada West
- Died: March 30, 1933 (aged 69) Timmins, Ontario
- Occupation: Politician, Prospector, Entrepreneur

Daniel O'Connor (January 31, 1864 - March 30, 1933) was a Canadian politician, entrepreneur and prospector from Pembroke, Canada West. In the late 1880s, O'Connor moved to Sudbury, where he became a sawmill operator and was elected the town's second mayor in 1894. Recognizing the potential for tourism in the area of Temagami, he founded the Temagami Hotel and Steamboat Company in 1903, which operated the Temagami Inn, the Lady Evelyn Hotel, the Ronnoco Hotel and a number of steamboats, including the Belle of Temagami.

When O'Connor moved to Temagami, he was hoping to find some mineral prospects. In 1899, O'Connor created test pits in east-central Strathy Township that later became Big Dan Mine, which is named after him. Other mines in Temagami that bear his name are Little Dan at Arsenic Lake and O'Connor near Lake Temagami. O'Connor continued to move northwards where he discovered deposits of gold. He moved to Connaught, Ontario and ran a general store.

== Personal life ==
O'Connor was born in Pembroke, Canada West to Patrick O'Connor, and the family moved to Sudbury when he was young. His brother Larry was also a mayor of Sudbury.

On 30 March 1933, O'Connor died at St. Mary's hospital in the city of Timmins where his daughter was living, after being hospitalized there for a week. The cause of his death was bronchopneumonia. He was survived by his wife and his daughter, Jos. Clemens.
