= Turtle Lake (Temagami) =

Lake in Temagami, Ontario, Canada

- Location of Turtle Lake in Ontario.
- Location: Nipissing, Northeastern Ontario, Canada
- Coordinates: 47°03′35″N 79°50′07″W
- Type: Lake
- Max. length: 2.2 km (1.4 mi)
- Max. width: 0.4 km (0.25 mi)
- Surface elevation: 298 m (978 ft)

Turtle Lake is an east–west trending lake in Strathy Township, Temagami, Nipissing District in Northeastern Ontario, Canada. It lies in the Sherman Mine property between the South and East pits. It is also the location of an abandoned jack ladder along its southern shore that floated logs to the former Milne sawmill in the Milne Townsite.

== See also ==
- Lakes of Temagami
