= Coppersand Mine =

Copper mine in Temagami, Ontario, Canada

- Location in Ontario

Location
- Location: Temagami, Ontario, Canada; 47°08′31.45″N 80°04′11.45″W

Production
- Products: Copper

Coppersand Mine is an abandoned copper mine in Temagami, Northeastern Ontario, Canada. It is located near the eastern shore of Ferguson Bay of Lake Temagami. A winter road from Sandy Inlet through Coppersand Lake was created to the mine in 1957. Subsequently, a small road, known as Miner's Road, was constructed off Kokoko Sideroad in 1970 to access the mine. Mining from the late 1950s to 1970s resulted in the creation of a small open pit.

== See also ==
- List of mines in Temagami
