= Danlou Occurrence =

Mineralized zone in Ontario, Canada

- Location in Ontario

Location
- Location: Temagami, Ontario, Canada; 47°9′8.44″N 79°44′32.79″W

The Danlou Occurrence, also known as the Danlou Gold Occurrence and the Mortimer Occurrence, is a mineralized zone in Northeastern Ontario, Canada. Gold is the occurrence's primary commodity, while copper and silver are secondary commodities. It occurs in a quartz vein within a diabase-porphyry shear zone. Pyrite and chalcopyrite are present in small amounts.

The Occurrence is located 10 km (6.2 mi) north-northeast of the town of Temagami between Highway 11 and the Ontario Northland Railway. It is named after Danlou Mines Limited, which did work on the Danlou Occurrence in the early 1960s.

Trenches and a vertical exploration shaft are present in the Danlou Occurrence from past mineral explorations. Work began in 1905 when the occurrence was discovered that year. During this period, a small test pit was sunk into the quartz vein. In 1961–1963, Danlou Mines Limited performed trenching. The highest assays were 0.18 oz (5.1 g) of gold per ton and 1 oz (28 g) of silver per ton over 18 ft (5.5 m). Danlou Mines Limited also completed three diamond drill holes totalling 106 m (348 ft) north of the Danlou Occurrence. All drill samples assayed nil for gold and silver.

== See also ==
- List of mines in Temagami
