= Murray Biggar =

Canadian politician

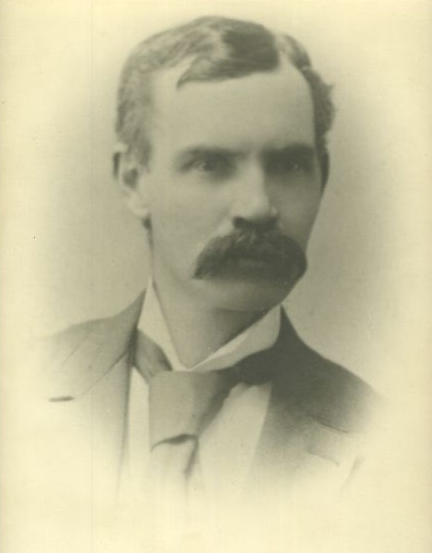
- Biggar, c. 1895

Mayor of Sudbury, Ontario
- In office January 1895 – December 1895
- Preceded by: Daniel O'Connor
- Succeeded by: Stephen Fournier

Personal details
- Born: Murray Clement Biggar c. 1855
- Occupation: Lawyer
- Disappeared: c. 1896; Sudbury, Ontario

Murray Clement Biggar was a Canadian politician, who served as mayor of Sudbury, Ontario in 1895.

During his term in office, the municipal council embarked on the town's first major public works projects, awarding contracts to M.N. McCarthy and W.H. Plummer for the construction of sewage, waterworks and electrical systems. However, the projects faced numerous delays, including a strike for higher wages by workers on the waterworks project, a cost overrun which forced the council to hold a referendum for authorization to spend the additional funds, and scheduling problems which resulted in the projects' completion being delayed by almost a year after the council voided the penalty clause which was its only mechanism for ensuring that the contractors finished the project on time. As a result, in that fall's municipal election, Biggar was defeated by former mayor Stephen Fournier.

Following his defeat, Biggar disappeared from Sudbury in 1896, abandoning his law practice and his family. He was rumoured to have drowned in Lake Ramsey, but Sudbury resident Gus Harwood found him living in San Francisco in 1898. He had gone briefly to Yukon to prospect in the Klondike Gold Rush, but then moved to San Francisco after failing to stake a mining claim.

In 2017, the Sudbury Theatre Centre staged a play written by local playwright Judy Straughan about Biggar's disappearance. The play's cast included the city's current mayor, Brian Bigger, as well as local writers Matthew Heiti and Roger Nash.
