= Lady Evelyn Hotel =

Hotel in Ontario, Canada

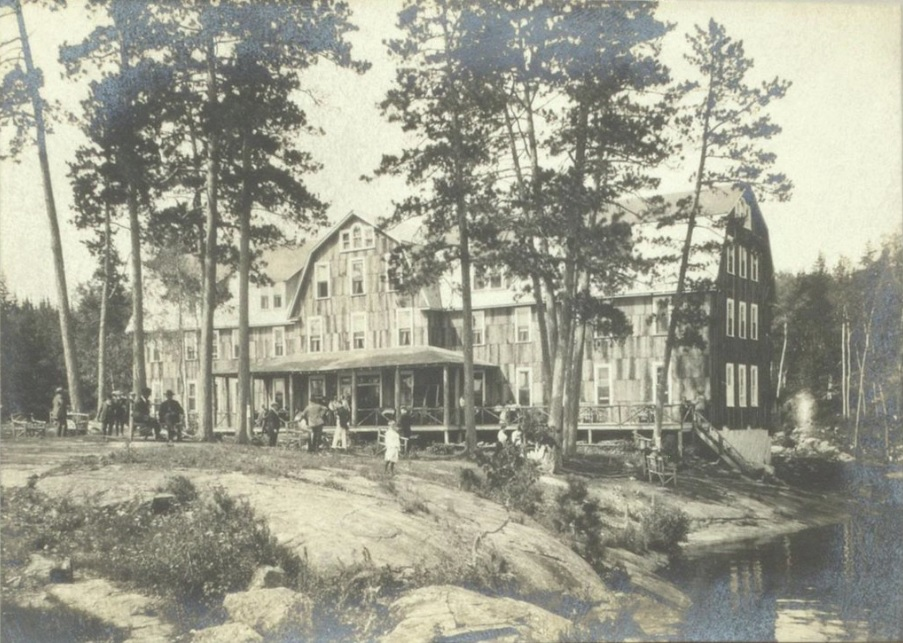
- The Lady Evelyn Hotel in 1907
- Interactive map of the Lady Evelyn Hotel area

General information
- Type: Hotel
- Location: Deer Island, Lake Temagami, Temagami, Ontario, Canada
- Coordinates: 47°09′44.89″N 80°07′43.36″W
- Completed: 1904
- Destroyed: 1912

The Lady Evelyn Hotel was a hotel on the northeast point of Deer Island in the North Arm of Lake Temagami in Temagami, Ontario, Canada. The 3 1/2-story, 108-bed building was the largest of three hotels operated on Lake Temagami by the Temagami Steamboat and Hotel Company. The company established the Lady Evelyn Hotel in 1904 under the management of Dan O'Connor and the financial backing of W. G. Gooderham and Alex and David Faskin. Supplies and passengers to the Lady Evelyn Hotel were delivered by steamboat (e.g. Belle of Temagami) from the lakeside landing at the Temagami station.

In 1906, the Canadian Summer Resort Guide declared that the Lady Evelyn Hotel, Ronnoco Hotel and Temagami Inn were "not the result of a slow gradual growth, but prepared for the best class of guests, with every regard for their comfort and convenience". The three Temagami hotels could accommodate up to 500 guests at daily rates of $2.50 to $3.50 per person, among the highest in Ontario during this period. Weekly rates of $16 to $21 were available for the residential or resort-oriented vacations in which the Lady Evelyn Hotel and Temagami Inn specialized. At full occupancy in the height of the season, the three hotels brought in approximately $10,000 per week.

On July 4, 1912, the Lady Evelyn Hotel was completely destroyed by a fire of unknown origin. The estimated loss was over $30,000 and was only partially covered by insurance. A number of guests were at the hotel but there was no loss of life and no details were available as to whether any personal effects of guests were destroyed. The hotel was never rebuilt and is now the site of melted and twisted remains.
