= Milne Townsite =

Milne
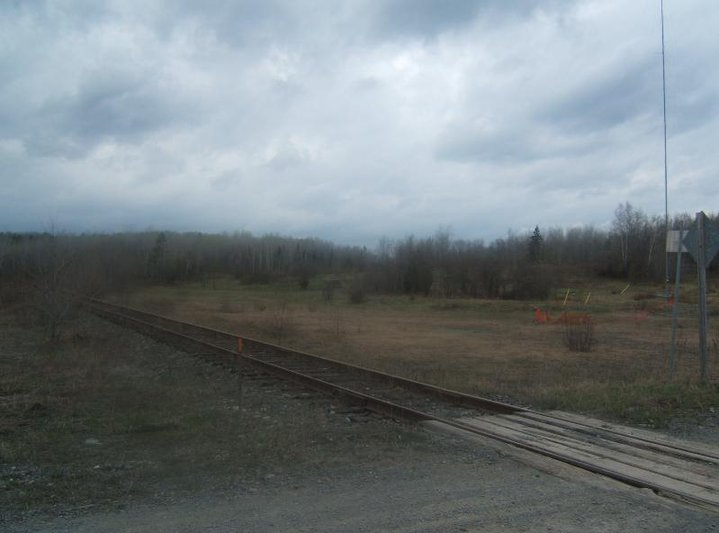
- Area of the Milne Townsite. Railroad in foreground is the main line to Sherman Mine.

- Location of the Milne Townsite in Ontario
- Coordinates: 47°04′33″N 79°48′35″W
- Country: Canada
- Province: Ontario
- Region: Northeastern Ontario
- District: Nipissing
- Municipality: Temagami
- Elevation: 312 m (1,024 ft)
- Time zone: UTC-5 (Eastern Time Zone)
  - Summer (DST): UTC-4 (Eastern Time Zone)
- Postal Code FSA: P0M
- Area codes: 705, 249

The Milne Townsite, commonly referred to as Milnes, is an abandoned community in Strathy Township, municipality of Temagami, Nipissing District in northeastern Ontario, Canada, located on the north shore of Link Lake, just south of the Milne-Sherman Road, and about 2 km (1.2 mi) north of the town of Temagami. It covered about 3.5% of the town of Temagami and had 40 residents.

== History ==
The Milne Townsite was constructed to support the Milne sawmill, which in turn was operated by the Milne Lumber Company. In 1990, the province of Ontario bought and closed the mill in an effort to ease tensions concerning logging (see Red Squirrel Road). Operation of the sawmill ceased and 150 people lost their jobs. During this time the municipality of Temagami announced that another sawmill would be constructed sometime in the future. Sherman Mine, a large iron ore mine west of the townsite, also stopped mining operations during the following year. Before operations ceased in 1990, the Milne sawmill used 32% of wood in the Temagami region. The houses and sawmill that once stood in the area no longer exist, but remnants include cement pads and cement pillars. In the 2000s, the Temagami Forest Products white birch sawmill was constructed where the Milne sawmill was located. Its formation resulted in 62 jobs for the community.

== Geology ==
Adjacent to the Milne sawmill site is a band of fine to coarse grained pyroclastic material part of the Temagami Greenstone Belt. The pyroclastics are prolonged, smooth to subangular with compositions ranging from rhyolitic to pumiceous and are generally no more than 1 cm (0.39 in) to 8 cm (3.1 in) in size. Because the pyroclastics are parallel to the Link Lake Deformation Zone, they contain a well-preserved foliation.
