= Tasse Lake Deformation Zone =

The Tasse Lake Deformation Zone is a zone of deformation in Temagami, Ontario, Canada, extending from the western boundary of Chambers Township through Tasse Lake in the east. Its structure is at least 0.5 km (0.31 mi) wide and 3 km (1.9 mi) long, although it remains uncertain if it extends east of Tasse Lake.

== See also ==
- Link Lake Deformation Zone
- Net Lake-Vermilion Lake Deformation Zone
- Northeast Arm Deformation Zone
