= Pitarrilla mine =

Silver mine in Durango, Mexico

Pitarrilla project
- Location: Durango, Mexico
- Products: silver

The Pitarrilla deposit is a large silver deposit located in north central Mexico in the state of Durango. Pitarrilla represents one of the largest unexploited silver resources in Mexico and in the world having estimated reserves of 479 million oz of silver. The deposit also has reserves amounting to 157.2 million tonnes of ore grading 0.29% lead and 0.79% zinc.

== See also ==
- List of silver mines
