= Stephen Fournier =

Canadian politician (1852–1919)

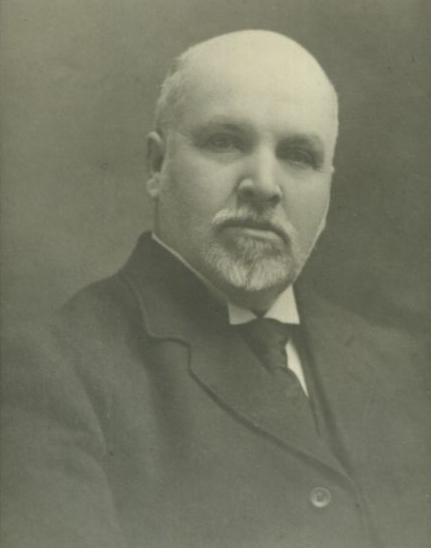
- Fournier, c. 1893

Mayor of Sudbury, Ontario
- In office January 1893 – December 1893
- Preceded by: Office established
- Succeeded by: Daniel O'Connor
- In office January 1896 – December 1896
- Preceded by: Murray Biggar
- Succeeded by: Francis Cochrane

Personal details
- Born: Jean-Étienne Fournier; December 27, 1852 Trois-Pistoles, Canada East
- Died: February 11, 1929 (aged 76)

Jean-Étienne (Stephen) Fournier (December 27, 1852 to February 11, 1929) was a Canadian politician, who served as the first mayor of Sudbury, Ontario.

Fournier worked for the Central Canada Railway and the Canadian Pacific Railway in Petawawa before moving to Sudbury, where he became the community's first postmaster in 1884. In 1885, he established the community's first general store, and was elected reeve of McKim Township. When Sudbury was incorporated as a town in 1893, he became the town's first mayor, and served a second term as mayor in 1896.

Fournier was also chair of the town's first school board; classes were initially held in his own home until the town's first school was built. Fournier Gardens on Louis Street in Sudbury was named in his honour.
