= Link Lake (Nipissing District) =

Lake in Ontario, Canada

- Location of Link Lake in Ontario.
- Location: Temagami, Nipissing, Ontario
- Coordinates: 47°04′18″N 79°49′04″W
- Type: Lake
- Max. length: 3.1 km (1.9 mi)
- Max. width: 0.3 km (0.19 mi)
- Surface elevation: 300 m (980 ft)

Link Lake is a narrow lake in Ottawa River drainage basin in Strathy Township, Temagami, Nipissing District of Northeastern Ontario, Canada. The abandoned Milne Townsite lies on the northern shore of the lake.

The primary outflow is Johnny Creek to Net Lake, which flows via Cassels Lake, Rabbit Lake, the Matabitchuan River and Lake Timiskaming into the Ottawa River.

Link Lake is the location of the Link Lake Shear Zone, which runs along the axis of the lake.

== See also ==
- Lakes of Temagami
