= Kanichee layered intrusive complex =

Rock body in Ontario

Coordinates: 47°06′12.36″N 79°50′43.18″W

The Kanichee layered intrusive complex, also called the Kanichee intrusion and Ajax intrusion, is a layered intrusion in Northeastern Ontario, Canada, located in the central portion of Strathy Township about 6.5 km (4.0 mi) northwest of the town of Temagami. It consists of mafic-ultramafic rocks and is the largest of many mafic-ultramafic intrusions associated with felsic and mafic metavolcanic rocks in the northern Archean Temagami Greenstone Belt.

Five magmatic cycles have been identified in the Kanichee layered intrusive complex, the first of which formed a PGE deposit with associated gold, copper and nickel mineralization. Ore mineralogy includes pyrrhotite, pentlandite, chalcopyrite and pyrite. The deposit has been quarried by Kanichee Mine.

== See also ==
- Volcanism of Canada
- Volcanism of Eastern Canada
