= Kokoko Iron Range =

- Stratigraphic range: Lower Neoarchean
- Type: Geological formation

Lithology
- Primary: Chert, jasper, magnetite
- Other: Hematite

Location
- Coordinates: 47°4′26.82″N 80°0′6.12″W
- Region: Ontario
- Country: Canada

Type section
- Named for: Kokoko Lake

The Kokoko Iron Range is an elongated trend of iron ore located between Kokoko Lake and Business Lake in Temagami, Ontario, Canada. It consists of an interbedded sequence of chert, jasper and magnetite with a small proportion of hematite.

Unlike the neighbouring Vermilion and Northeast Arm ranges, the Kokoko Iron Range has not been an area of past open-pit mining. It has, however, seen sporadic mineral exploration since at least the early 1950s. This work has identified three possible ore bodies containing more than 25% magnetite. Two occur at its western end while the other is near the middle of the range. Sampling of the Kokoko Iron Range has resulted in grades ranging from 25% to 40% iron over 500 ft (150 m).
