= Hudson Bay Mine =

Silver mine in Cobalt, Ontario, Canada

Coordinates: 47°24′15″N 79°41′5″W

The Hudson Bay Mine is an abandoned silver mine in Cobalt, Ontario, Canada. It is located north of the Trethewey Mine near Sasaginaga Creek.
