= Belle of Temagami =

Canadian wooden steamboat

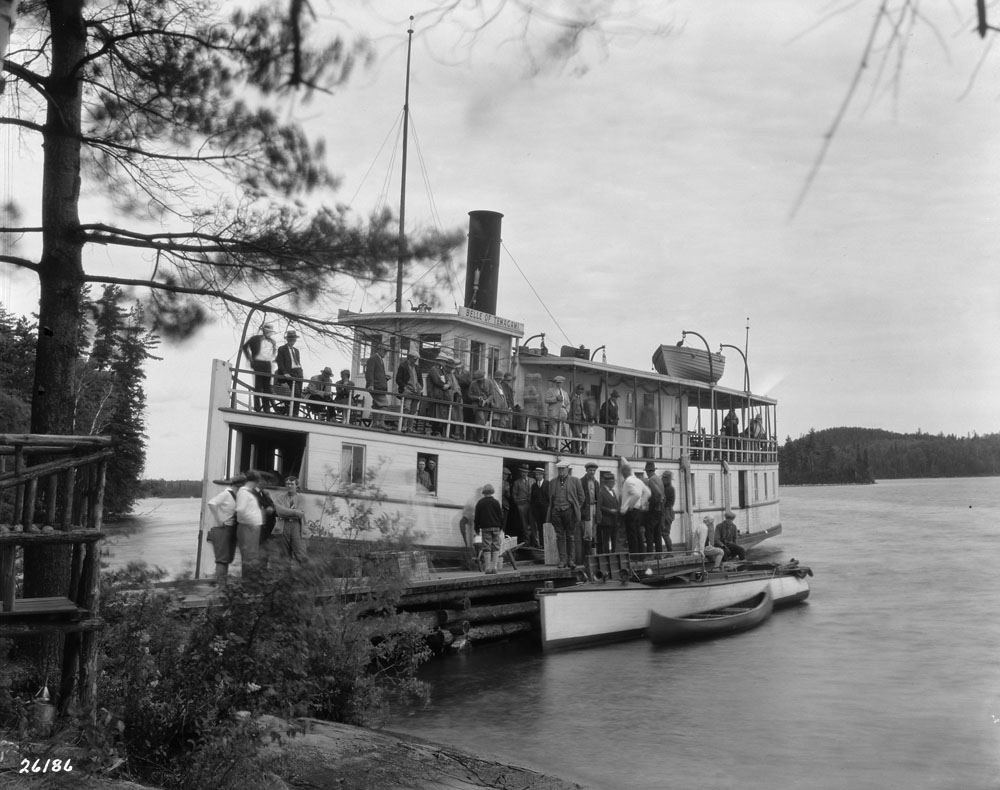
- Belle of Temagami at Bear Island in 1926

History
- Name: Belle of Temagami
- Owner: 1900s–1910s: O'Connor Steamboat and Hotel Company; 1910s–1930s: Perron and Marsh Navigation Company; 1930s–1940s: Temagami Boat Company
- Builder: G. A. Pontbriand
- Launched: 7 May 1906
- Completed: 1906
- Identification: Official No. C122017
- Fate: Dismantled in 1945
- Notes: The last passenger steamer in Northern Ontario

General characteristics
- Type: Screw steamer
- Tonnage: 169 GRT or 102 NRT
- Length: 100 ft (30 m)
- Beam: 22.6 ft (6.9 m)
- Depth: 6.2 ft (1.9 m)
- Decks: 2
- Installed power: One single-screw steam engine
- Propulsion: Propeller
- Capacity: 300 passengers

Belle of Temagami, generally referred to as Belle, was a wooden steamboat built and used in Temagami, Ontario, Canada during the first half of the 20th century. She operated as a passenger steamer on Lake Temagami where she brought travellers to cottages, hotels, lodges and camps from the lakeside landing near the Temagami railway station. She was also used to deliver supplies on the lake. Three companies owned Belle throughout her years of service.

== Characteristics ==
The steamer had a length of 100 ft (30 m), making her the largest vessel ever to cruise Lake Temagami. Belle had two decks, a 22.6 ft (6.9 m) wide beam and a depth of 6.2 ft (1.9 m). Her engine consisted of one cylinder, one boiler and one propeller. She had a 169 gross register tons (GRT), a 102 net register tons (NRT) and a hull consisting primarily of wood. Belle was capable of carrying up to 300 passengers but 175 was the licensed limit. An onboard snack bar allowed passengers to buy snack foods while aboard the vessel.

== History ==
Belle was built in Temagami, Ontario during 1906 by G. A. Pontbriand. Completed and launched the same year, she was first owned by the O'Connor Steamboat and Hotel Company which had been established by the businessman Dan O'Connor in 1904. By 1910, the company was operating a fleet of 10 steamers on Lake Temagami, of which Belle was the flagship. Business declined precipitously when World War I began in 1914, bringing some hard times to the tourism industry on Lake Temagami. During this time smaller less costly boats replaced Belle, which had been left in the lakeside landing. Two converted sailboats, Kokomis and Winonia, were normally used to haul freight. Kokomis became the main vessel to carry passengers and mail.

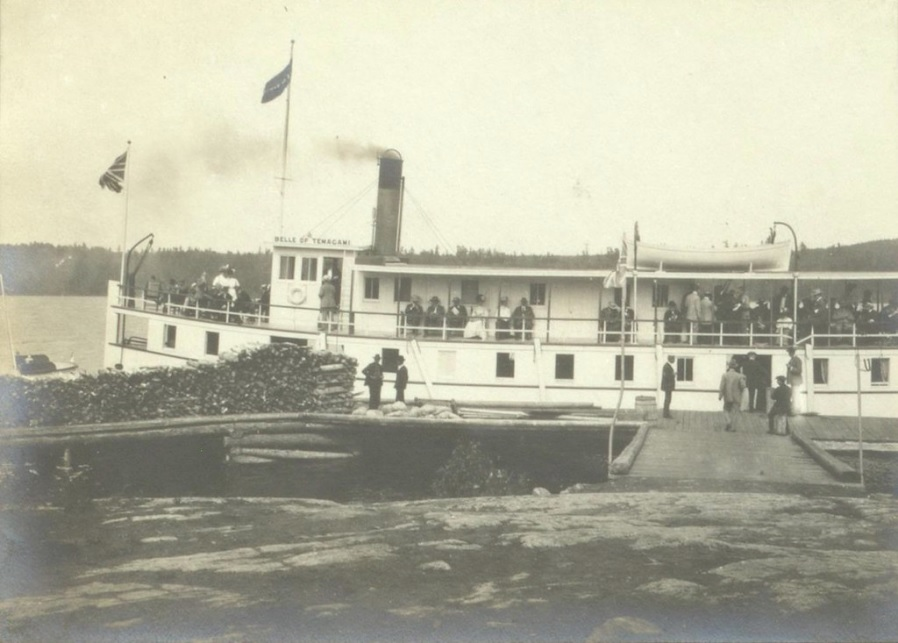
Belle of Temagami in front of the Lady Evelyn Hotel

The end of World War I in 1918 marked the beginning of a new tourism era in Temagami. Several new lodges, camps and cottages were built and it was common for 300 people to crowd the train station platform. A new group, the Perron and Marsh Navigation Company, bought and operated Belle during this period. She collided with the Keewaydin dock around 1930, nearly destroying it. The Temagami Boat Company had bought Belle by 1936 and she was operated to 1939. She had her back broken around 1939 while hauling up on land at Camp Wanapitei, a youth camp situated on the northern shore of Ferguson Bay.

She was still the biggest boat afloat between James Bay and Manitoulin Island on Lake Huron in 1940. After taking some damage from dock collisions and shoal groundings in her career, she sank in her winter quarters on Muddy Water Bay during the winter of 1939 or 1940. The cause of her sinking was likely the loosening of oakum in her seams. After sitting in the bay waterlogged for at least a year, she was salvaged, repaired, and returned to duty. Passenger traffic declined during World War II and business tumbled. During this time the Temagami Boat Company suffered financially and kept Belle out of service for most of the war years. The Temagami Boat Company was bought out by the Temiskaming and Northern Ontario Railway (now called the Ontario Northland Railway) in 1944. At the time of purchase, Belle was the only steamer left on Lake Temagami. The T&NO Railway later decided that she did not fit with their ambitious plans to modernize the boating operation on Lake Temagami and was dismantled on the shore of Muddy Water Bay in 1945. She was replaced in 1946 by Aubrey Cosens VC, a faster diesel-powered boat named after a World War II hero who was awarded the Victoria Cross.

Belle was the last passenger steamer in Northern Ontario waters. In her peak years she did a regular daily run on Lake Temagami through the summer months, cruising down to the camps and the aboriginal village on Bear Island, stopping at the Hudson's Bay Company post, serving lunch and refreshments on board, leaving at 10:00 a.m. and starting back up at 5:50 p.m., all for a couple of dollars a trip.
