= Noche Buena mine =

Silver mine in Mexico

- Interactive map of Noche Buena mine
- Location: Zacatecas, Mexico; 24°42′00″N 101°40′05″W
- Products: Silver
- Company: Goldcorp

The Noche Buena mine is one of the largest silver mines in Mexico and in the world. The mine is located in the center of the country in Zacatecas. The mine has estimated reserves of 1 million oz of gold and 32.4 million oz of silver. Noche Buena translates into English literally as "Good Night", but is typically the term used for the Christmas Eve holiday in Latin American cultures.
