= Temagami-Lorrain Mine =

Mine in Ontario, Canada

- Location in Ontario
- Location: Temagami, Ontario, Canada; 47°06′39.79″N 79°40′58.2″W
- Products: Cobalt, gold, arsenic, silver, nickel, copper

Temagami-Lorrain Mine is an abandoned surface and underground mine in Northeastern Ontario, Canada. It is located about 10 km (6.2 mi) northeast of the town of Temagami near Sauvé Lake in central Cassels Township. It is named after the Temagami-Lorrain Mining Company, which carried out work on the property in the early 1900s.

Development by the Temagami-Lorrain Mining Company consisted of trenching, stripping and sinking of a 35 m (115 ft) shaft in fractured Nipissing diabase. The primary commodities mined at Temagami-Lorrain were cobalt and gold. Secondary commodities included arsenic, silver, nickel and copper. In 1925, samples from the waste rock dump showed considerable cobalt bloom and one of the richest had an analysis of 5.87% cobalt, 0.12% nickel, 1.08% copper, 12.48% iron, 14.17% sulfur, 10.39% arsenic, 1.08 oz (31 g) of gold and traces of silver. Exploration in 2005 assayed low silver to 37 g (1.3 oz) of gold per ton.

== See also ==
- List of mines in Temagami
