= Trethewey Mine =

Silver mine in Cobalt, Canada

Coordinates: 47.4°N 79.6852777778°W

The Trethewey Mine is an abandoned silver mine in Cobalt, Ontario, Canada, located northwest of the Coniagas Mine near Sasaginaga Lake. The mine was discovered in May 1903 by William Griffith Trethewey.
