= Big Dan Shear Zone =

Geological feature in Temagami, Ontario, Canada

The Big Dan Shear Zone is a north–south trending shear zone in Northeastern Ontario, Canada, located in the municipality of Temagami.

== Geology ==
The Big Dan Shear Zone was contemporaneous to volcanism due to the higher density of felsic dikes situated at the shear zone. These dikes are only present north of the Link Lake Deformation Zone, therefore they may be subvolcanic feeders to the felsic lava flows to the south.

Renewed tectonism along the Big Dan Shear Zone displaced sediments east of the Ontario Northland Railway. This phase of tectonic activity along the Big Dan Shear Zone also displaced felsic dikes north of the shear zone. However, considerable displacement of the dikes at this location is unknown.

The most recent tectonic activity of the Big Dan Shear Zone displaced a Proterozoic dike composed of diabase, which intersects the zone. A similar abundance of felsic dikes are adjacent to Arsenic Lake just west of Highway 11, indicating that similar tectonism also occurred along that structural zone. Therefore, these north-trending shear zones may have been tectonically active for at least a billion years.
