= Nova Scotia Mine =

Silver mine in Cobalt, Ontario, Canada

- Location within Ontario Location within Canada
- Location: Ontario, Canada; 47.38694°N 79.66167°W
- Products: Silver
- Discovered: 1904
- Closed: 1957

The Nova Scotia Mine is an abandoned silver mine in Cobalt, Ontario, Canada, located on the east shore of Peterson Lake.
