= Independence mine =

Mine in United States

Coordinates: 45°8′56″N 115°23′39″W

The Independence Mine was a larger producing mine in the Pine Creek region of the Coeur d'Alene mining district in Idaho. It produced lead, silver, and copper. The mine claim borders the Bunker Hill Sullivan mine claim, and work in on the mine was stopped in the 1940s. It was a major producer during both world wars. It also had a large hand in the development of Pinehurst, Idaho.

Its ore body was unique, and leads to question about the formation of silver valley and belt supergroup of which it was an ore body in the Prichard formation.
