= Raise (mining) =

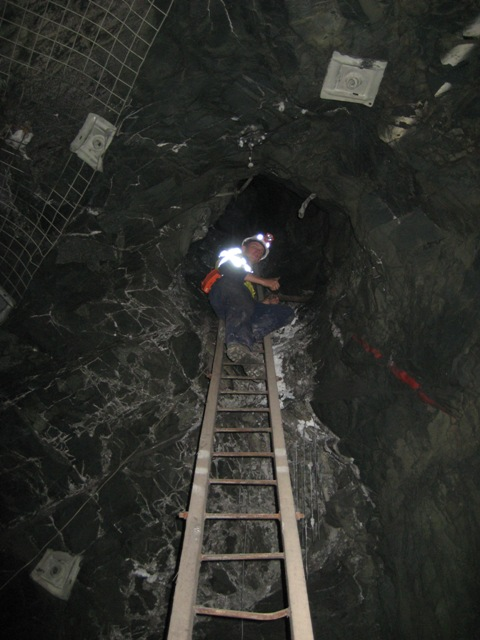
An emergency escape raise.

In underground mining, a raise refers to a vertical or inclined shaft excavation that leads from one level, or drift, to another. A raise may also extend to surface. There are four excavation methods for raises:

1. Conventional or open raise
2. Long-hole or drop raise
3. Alimak
4. Raise boring

Raises serve a number of purposes including:

1. Transportation of ore and waste rock
2. Ventilation
3. Creating a free face for mining
4. Movement of workers via manway ladders
