= O'Connor Mine =

Surface mine in Ontario, Canada

- Location in Ontario
- Location: Temagami, Ontario, Canada; 47°02′23.4″N 79°49′49.3″W
- Products: Copper, sulfur/pyrite, nickel, gold, zinc

O'Connor Mine, also known as Milestone Mine, is an abandoned surface mine in Northeastern Ontario, Canada. It is located about 1 km (0.62 mi) southwest of the town of Temagami near the Northeast Arm of Lake Temagami in northern Strathcona Township. It is named after John O'Connor who first developed the mine site.

Development consisted of several small open pits and trenches. The primary commodities mined at O'Connor was copper, sulfur/pyrite and nickel. Secondary commodities included gold and zinc. A number of small lenses of massive pyrite with much disseminated material have been opened up along the foot-wall of a sheared diorite sill near the northeastern arm of Lake Temagami. Some of the mined material was shipped.

A 1942 report states that work had been done in the area in the 1920s. In 1962, the Candela Development Company dug trenches and drilled four diamond drill holes totaling 376.1m and found 11.3m of sulphide averaging 0.5% copper and another 2.4m averaging 0.47% copper and 0.22% nickel. In 1970, the Milestone Exploration Company held the claim for the O'Connor prospect. A 2022 UAV magnetic survey and prospecting report suggested that further sampling was in order.

== See also ==
- List of mines in Temagami
