= Temagami North =

Community in Nipissing District, Ontario, Canada

Coordinates: 47°06′40″N 79°47′30″W

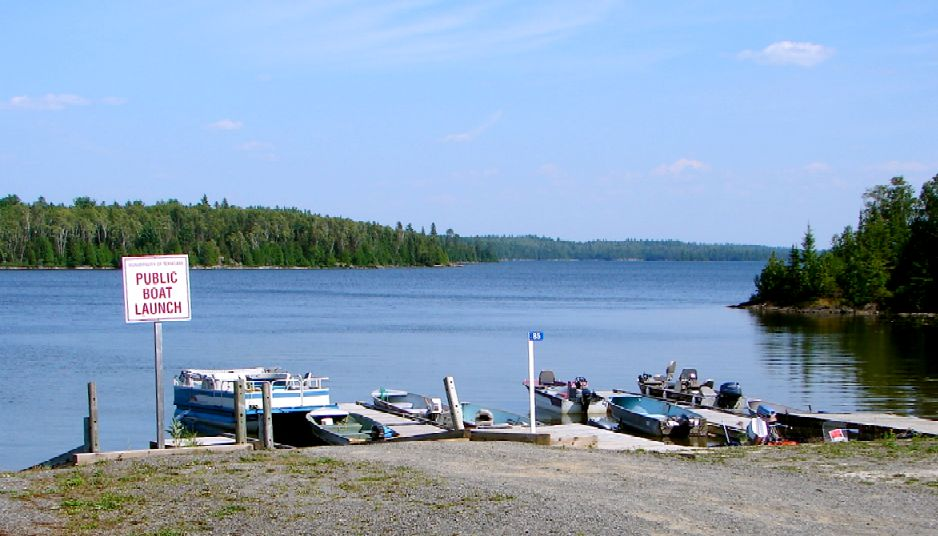
Boat launch on Net Lake near the arena of Temagami North

Temagami North, formerly known as Goward, is a community comprising part of the municipality of Temagami in Nipissing District, Ontario, Canada. It is a residential subdivision centred on Spruce Drive, about 5 kilometres (3.1 mi) north of Temagami itself.

In 1924 the post office at Goward was opened to serve the needs of the lumber operation. At its peak, Goward had 36 houses, 3 bunkhouses, a small grocery store, a mill, blacksmith building and a one room school house. The lumber mill closed in 1965. In 1967, the post office was closed, Goward was to be demolished and the land reverted to the crown.

Temagami North is locally known as the "Townsite" because it was created in the 1960s to supply Sherman Mine further south and as a new residential location away from the town of Temagami. Temagami North is surrounded by historic mines. Barton Mine to the north produced molybdenum on a small-scale in 1918 and Norrie Mine on the eastern shore of Net Lake was in development prior to 1920. There are known kimberlite pipes that are considered diamondiferous in the area that could lead to future mining.

Temagami North sits on the western shore of Net Lake, where people can go canoeing, fishing, and boating. The main arena of Temagami is situated near the shore of Net Lake and is used seasonally for hockey and curling. In 2005, the roof of the arena collapsed inward from snow weight during winter.

== See also ==
- Milne Townsite
- Mining community
