= Coniagas Mine =

Abandoned silver mine in Canada

Coordinates: 47°23′55″N 79°41′20″W

The Coniagas Mine is an abandoned silver mine in Cobalt, Ontario, Canada, located on the western side of Cobalt Lake. The mine was discovered in May 1903 by William Griffith Trethewey. The claim was sold to R. W. Leonard of St. Catharines Ontario and placed into production in 1904. The mine and the associated Coniagas Reduction Works of St Catharines operated until 1924 when known reserves were exhausted. The Coniagas Group was noted in mining circles being involved in the establishment of the Coniaurum Mine in Timmins and the Sturgeon River Mine in Geraldton Ontario.
