= Arsenic Lake =

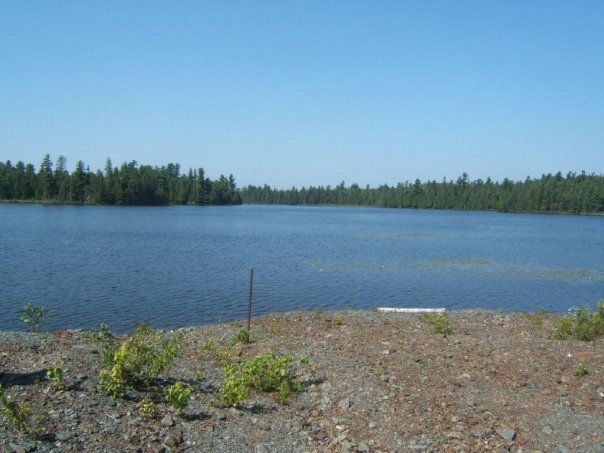
- View of Arsenic Lake from Leckie Mine on its eastern shore

- Location of Arsenic Lake in Ontario
- Location: Temagami, Nipissing, Ontario
- Coordinates: 47°05′33″N 79°48′20″W
- Type: Lake
- Part of: Ottawa River drainage basin
- Max. length: 1.3 km (0.81 mi)
- Max. width: 0.4 km (0.25 mi)
- Surface elevation: 310 m (1,020 ft)

Arsenic Lake is a lake in the Ottawa River drainage basin in Strathy Township of Temagami, Nipissing District in Northeastern Ontario, Canada, located between the town of Temagami and Temagami North near Highway 11. It is the only officially named Arsenic Lake in Canada.

The primary outflow is an unnamed creek to Net Lake, which flows via Cassels Lake, Rabbit Lake, the Matabitchuan River and Lake Timiskaming into the Ottawa River.

== See also ==
- Lakes of Temagami
