= Net Lake-Vermilion Lake Deformation Zone =

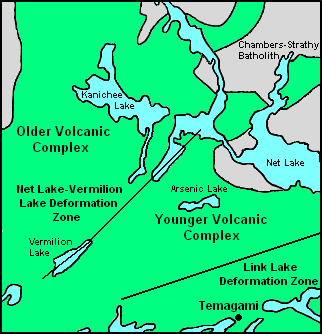
Geologic map of Strathy Township displaying the location of the Net Lake-Vermilion Lake Deformation Zone.

The Net Lake-Vermilion Lake Deformation Zone, also known as the Net Lake-Vermilion Lake Zone of Deformation, is a zone of deformation in Temagami, Ontario, Canada, extending from Vermilion Lake to Net Lake in a northeasterly direction.

== See also ==
- Link Lake Deformation Zone
- Northeast Arm Deformation Zone
- Tasse Lake Deformation Zone
