= Northeast Arm Deformation Zone =

The Northeast Arm Deformation Zone, also known as the Northeast Arm Zone of Deformation, is a zone of deformation in Strathcona Township of Temagami, Ontario, Canada. It extends along the northeast arm of Lake Temagami. The Link Lake Deformation Zone just to the north is interpreted to be an extension of the Northeast Arm Deformation Zone.

== See also ==
- Net Lake-Vermilion Lake Deformation Zone
- Tasse Lake Deformation Zone
