= Leckie Mine =

Gold mine in Ontario

Leckie
- Location in Ontario
- Location: Temagami, Ontario, Canada; 47°05′35.57″N 079°47′48.03″W
- Products: Gold
- Production: Not available
- Opened: ~1900, 1933
- Closed: 1909, 1937
- Company: Progenitor Metals Corp.

Leckie Mine, also known as Penrose Mine, Little Dan Mine and Sterling Mine, is an abandoned gold producing underground mine in Northeastern Ontario, Canada, located on the eastern shore of Arsenic Lake 4 km (2.5 mi) north of the town of Temagami. In 2018, it was owned by Progenitor Metals Corp. In 2025, Solstice Gold Corp owned the claims. An estimated 483,500 tonnes of ore remain in the mine, which could contain 102,720 ounces of gold.

Leckie Mine is named after Major Robert Gilmour Leckie (1833 – 1913), a Canadian mining engineer from Renfrewshire, Scotland, United Kingdom. Leckie was an owner of the mine in the early 1900s.

== See also ==
- List of mines in Temagami
