= Link Lake Deformation Zone =

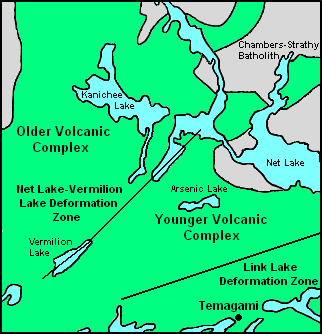
Geologic map of Strathy Township displaying the location of the Link Lake Deformation Zone.

The Link Lake Deformation Zone, also known as the Link Lake Zone of Deformation and the Link Lake Shear Zone, is a zone of deformation in Strathy Township of Temagami, Ontario, Canada. It is at least 0.5 km (0.31 mi) wide and over 3 km (1.9 mi) long, extending from Link Lake in the west to east of Highway 11.

== See also ==
- Net Lake-Vermilion Lake Deformation Zone
- Northeast Arm Deformation Zone
- Tasse Lake Deformation Zone
