= Sherman Mine =

Mine in Temagami, Ontario, Canada

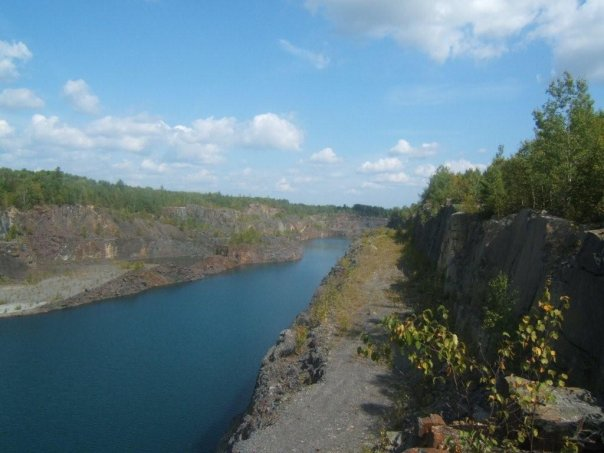
- East Pit of Sherman Mine. This image was taken from a cliff in the middle of the pit.

- Location in Ontario
- Location: Temagami, Ontario, Canada; 47°4′14.48″N 79°51′59.83″W
- Products: Iron
- Production: 84,603,516 long tons (85,961,141 t)
- Opened: 1968
- Closed: 1990

Sherman Mine is a closed open pit mine in Temagami, Ontario, Canada. It was a major producer of iron ore, starting production in 1968 and closing in 1990. Sherman was the largest open pit mine in Temagami, consisting of seven open pits known as the East Pit, South Pit, North Pit, West Pit and the Turtle Pits. The mine was discovered in the early part of the twentieth century, however interest was limited as a result of silver and gold discoveries in northeastern Ontario. While the Ontario government offered bounties to producers of iron ore, there was little interest in putting any iron mine into production as a result of cheaper Mesabi Range ores from the US and the Great Depression. It was only in the 1950s that Canadian steel producers started to investigate domestic supplies of iron ore. This would lead to the re-opening of the Moose Mountain Mine and development of the Adams, Sherman and Bruce Lake mines in Northern Ontario. The Sherman Mine operated in tandem with the Adams Mine in Kirkland Lake, and when the Adams Mine approached exhaustion of its economic ore reserves, the decision was made to also close the Sherman Mine. The surface infrastructure was removed and the site was abandoned. The waste piles are currently used by the municipality as a source of crushed stone for road works.

== Geology ==
The mine was established in two northeasterly trends of banded iron formation: the Northeast Arm Iron Range to the south and the Vermilion Range to the north. These 2.7 billion year old formations consist of thin layers of sediment that were deposited in a marine environment and subsequently metamorphosed.

== See also ==
- List of mines in Temagami
- Sherman volcano
