= Net Lake =

Lake in Nipissing District, Ontario, Canada

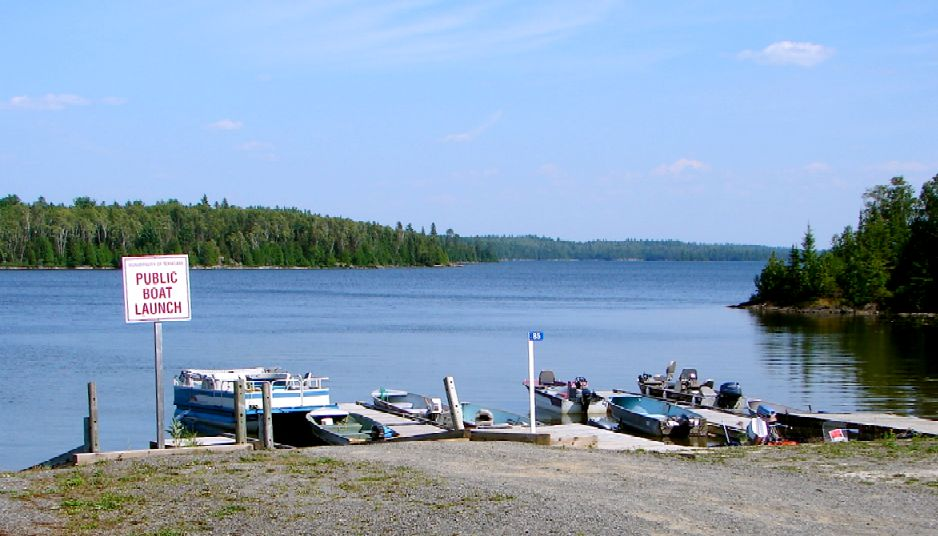
- Boat launch in Temagami North

- Location within Ontario
- Location: Temagami, Nipissing District, Ontario
- Coordinates: 47.113°N 79.804°W
- Part of: Ottawa River drainage basin
- Primary inflows: Johnny Creek, Net Creek
- Primary outflows: Net Creek
- Basin countries: Canada
- Max. length: 10 km (6.2 mi)

Net Lake is located within the municipality of Temagami, in the Nipissing District, Ontario, Canada. It covers a length of 10 km and is located in Temagami North. Fish in the lake include walleye, northern pike, trout, smallmouth bass, whitefish and panfish. There is only one lodge on Net Lake, which is called Andorra Lodge.

== See also ==
- Lakes of Temagami
