= Lady Evelyn =

Lady Evelyn may refer to:

== Places ==
- Lady Evelyn Hotel, a former hotel in Ontario, Canada
- Lady Evelyn Lake, a lake in Ontario, Canada
- Lady Evelyn River, a river in Ontario, Canada
- Lady Evelyn-Smoothwater Provincial Park, a park in Ontario, Canada

== People ==
- Lady Evelyn Beauchamp (née Herbert; 1901–1980), daughter of George Herbert, 5th Earl of Carnarvon
- Lady Evelyn Stewart Murray (1868–1940), a Scottish folklorist
- Lady Eve Balfour (1898–1990), a British farmer, educator and organic farming pioneer

== Other ==
- HMCS Lady Evelyn, a Royal Canadian Navy patrol boat
- Snaefell Wheel, also known as Lady Evelyn, a waterwheel on the Isle of Man
