= Obabika River Provincial Park =

Provincial park in Ontario

- IUCN category II (national park)
- Location within Ontario
- Interactive map of Obabika River Provincial Park
- Location: Ontario, Canada
- Nearest town: Temagami
- Coordinates: 47°12′58″N 80°16′54″W
- Area: 20,520 ha (79.2 sq mi)
- Designation: Waterway
- Established: 1989
- Named for: Obabika River
- Governing body: Ontario Parks
- Website: www.ontarioparks.com/park/obabikariver

The Obabika River Provincial Park is a provincial park in Ontario, Canada, straddling across the boundaries of the Sudbury, Nipissing, and Timiskaming Districts. While it is named after and includes the Obabika River, the bulk of the park extends north of Obabika Lake to the eastern boundary of Lady Evelyn-Smoothwater Provincial Park.

The park was created in 1989 and expanded in 2002 to 205 square kilometres (79 sq mi). Highlights of the park include island-dotted lakes, meandering rivers, bedrock uplands and expansive wetlands, as well as a number of historic settlements and indigenous archaeological sites dating back 6000 years. It provides trails through the pristine Obabika Old-Growth Forest, providing nature exploration and wildlife viewing opportunities.

Permitted activities include canoe camping, fishing, hiking, hunting, and boating (albeit with restrictions). The canoe routes through the park are part of Temagami's 2,400 kilometres (1,500 mi) long network of portages and waterways. Many of these portages are traditional indigenous routes called "nastawgan", which link this park with adjacent parks, conservation reserves, and Crown land.

== Description ==
The park can be divided into 4 areas, consisting of both wilderness (limited or no development) and natural environment (some development allowed to support the park's mission) zones:

- Obabika River Natural Environment Zone: This 1,080-hectare (2,700-acre) area encompasses the Obabika River itself, from Little Fry Lake bog to its confluence with the Sturgeon River. This section is 18 kilometres (11 mi) long and includes a 200-metre-wide (660 ft) setback from high waterline on both river banks.
- Obabika Lake North Natural Environment Zone: This area encompasses 411 hectares (1,020 acres) of water only in the northern end of Obabika Lake that fall within the park boundary.
- Lady Evelyn Peninsula Natural Environment Zone: This is a 13,784-hectare (34,060-acre) roadless area that includes a large peninsula surrounded by a series of lakes such as Lady Evelyn to the north and east, Sucker Gut and Willow Island to the west, and Diamond Lake to the south. It also protects the islands and eastern shore of the southern part of Lady Evelyn Lake.
- Chees-Kong-Abikong Wilderness Zone: This 4,880-hectare (12,100-acre) zone embodies the so-called "essence of Temagami", because it includes important natural and cultural features. This zone protects 2,400 hectares (5,900 acres) of original old-growth red and white pine-dominated forest, which is the largest old-growth eastern white pine forest in the world. The area includes extensive cliff and talus slope vegetation, cold springs, and bogs near Cliff Lake. This lake and its cliffs are known as Chees-kong-Abikong in Ojibwe (meaning "the place of the huge rock") and are spiritually significant to Temagami's First Nation communities. Other natural features include Wakimika Lake and River to the west, as well as an extensive open low shrub bog near Little Fry Lake. Regionally significant plant species in this zone include dwarf mistletoe, Virgin's-bower, roundleaved orchid, smooth blackberry, water dock, marsh fern, and painted trillium.

It is an operational park requiring permits for camping. Facilities included 65 backcountry campsites. Services provided are portage, campsite, and trail maintenance.

== Regional context ==
The park is part of a network of provincial parks and conservation reserves in the Temagami area. It forms a natural corridor between the adjacent Sturgeon River and Lady Evelyn-Smoothwater Provincial Parks. If established, it will also link to the proposed Lake Temagami Provincial Park. Furthermore, it borders on Bob Lake Conservation Reserve, which protects some old growth pine forests and provides an alternate canoe route between Lake Temagami, Diamond, and Obabika Lakes. Other adjacent conservation reserves are East Lady Evelyn Lake Conservation Reserve (protecting the northern part of Lady Evelyn Lake), Sugar Lake Conservation Reserve (a large roadless area between the upper and lower basin of Lady Evelyn Lake), and Jim Edwards Lake Conservation Reserve (includes the headwaters for the Lady Evelyn River watershed and old-growth pine stands).

== See also ==
- List of protected areas of Ontario
