= Maple Mountain (Ontario) =

Mountain in Ontario, Canada

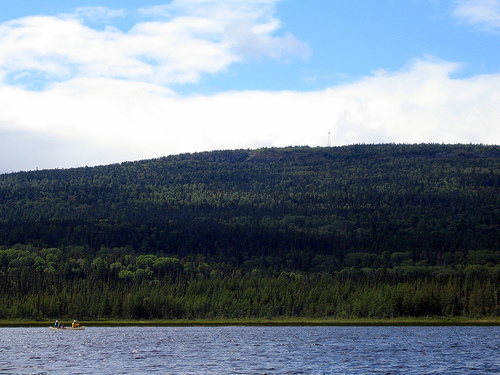
- Maple Mountain rising over Tupper Lake

Highest point
- Elevation: 642 m (2,106 ft)
- Prominence: 351 m (1,152 ft)
- Coordinates: 47°23′N 80°20′W

Geography
- Location within Ontario
- Location: Ontario
- Parent range: Canadian Shield, unnamed range
- Topo map: NTS 41P8 Lady Evelyn Lake

Climbing
- Easiest route: Hike

Maple Mountain is a mountain, located within Lady Evelyn-Smoothwater Provincial Park, Northeastern Ontario, Canada, estimated 642 m (2,106 ft) above mean sea level. It has a higher vertical rise over the surrounding landscape, 37 m (121 ft) higher than the Ishpatina Ridge, which is the highest point of land in Ontario rising over Scarecrow Lake. Maple Mountain rises over Tupper Lake and is considerably better known than Ishpatina Ridge. It ranks thirteenth, but when ranked by vertical rise it is the highest of the top 25 peaks in Ontario. The 30 m (100 ft) fire tower is also still intact and attracts many hikers. A 3.2-kilometre-long hiking trail leads to the abandoned fire tower.

Located in Timiskaming District of Northeastern Ontario, the mountain is not very accessible; roads and trails in the remote area are difficult to travel in poor weather. The most popular approach routes to Maple Mountain are by canoe and/or float plane.

The indigenous Temagami First Nation call the mountain Chee-bay-jing, meaning "the place where the spirits go" and consider it a sacred site. The English name of the mountain was given by Dr. Robert Bell of the Geological Survey of Canada in 1888. Bell was the first known non-aboriginal to scale the mountain.

== See also ==
- Ishpatina Ridge
- Temagami Magnetic Anomaly
- List of highest points of Canadian provinces and territories
