= Aubrey Cosens =

Canadian recipient of the Victoria Cross

Aubrey Cosens VC
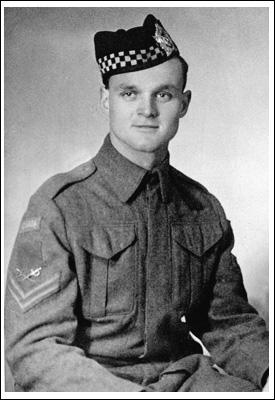
- Born: 21 May 1921; Latchford, Ontario, Canada
- Died: 26 February 1945 (aged 23) near Uedem, Nazi Germany
- Burial place: Groesbeek Canadian War Cemetery, The Netherlands
- Military career
- Allegiance: Canada
- Branch: Canadian Army
- Service years: 1940–1945
- Rank: Sergeant
- Units: The Queen's Own Rifles of Canada
- Conflicts: World War II: Western Front; Western Allied invasion of France; Battle of Normandy; Western Allied invasion of Germany †
- Awards: Victoria Cross

Aubrey Cosens VC (21 May 1921 – 26 February 1945) was a Canadian soldier and posthumous recipient of the Victoria Cross, the highest and most prestigious award for gallantry in the face of the enemy that can be awarded to British and Commonwealth forces.

== Military service ==
Aubrey Cosens was born in Latchford, Ontario on May 21, 1921, the only son to Mr. and Mrs. Charles Cosens. Shortly afterwards his family moved near Porquis Junction and this is where Cosens remained until he left school at 17 and went to work as a section hand on the Temiskaming and Northern Ontario Railway.

A year after taking this job, the Second World War broke out and Aubrey attempted to join the RCAF and was rejected for being too young.

In 1940 he joined The Argyll and Sutherland Highlanders of Canada as private and later transferred to The Queen's Own Rifles of Canada as a Corporal. He was promoted to sergeant while serving as part of the D-day reinforcements in Normandy, France.

He was 23 years old and a sergeant in The Queen's Own Rifles of Canada during his involvement as a Canadian Army soldier in the Second World War.

On the night of 25–26 February 1945 at Mooshof near Uedem, Germany, B and D Coys of The Queen's Own Rifles of Canada led a series of attacks on German strongholds. During the battle his Platoon Commander was killed-in-action and the platoon took heavy casualties. Sergeant Cosens assumed command of the four survivors of his platoon whom he placed in position to give him covering fire. Running forward alone to a tank, he took up an exposed position in front of the turret and directed its fire. When a further counter-attack had been repulsed, he ordered the tank to ram some farm buildings into which the Germans attackers had retreated. He went in alone, killing 22 of the defenders and taking the rest prisoners. He then dealt similarly with the occupants of two more buildings, but was shot by a sniper when he went to report back to superior officers.

== Legacy ==
Aubrey Cosens was mentioned in Robert Heinlein's Starship Troopers, albeit misspelled.

Little ships, the ones named for foot sloggers: Horatius, Alvin York, Swamp Fox, the Rog herself, bless her heart, Colonel Bowie, Devereux, Vercingetorix, Sandino, Aubrey Cousens, Kamehameha, Audie Murphy, Xenophon, Aguinaldo --

Buried at Groesbeek Canadian War Cemetery in the Netherlands. Plot VIII, Row H, Grave 2.

In 1986 in his birthplace of Latchford, the Sgt. Aubrey Cosens VC Memorial Bridge was named in his honour.

== See also ==
- Sgt. Aubrey Cosens VC Memorial Bridge
