= Montreal River (Timiskaming District) =

Tributary of the Ottawa River in Timiskaming District, Ontario, Canada

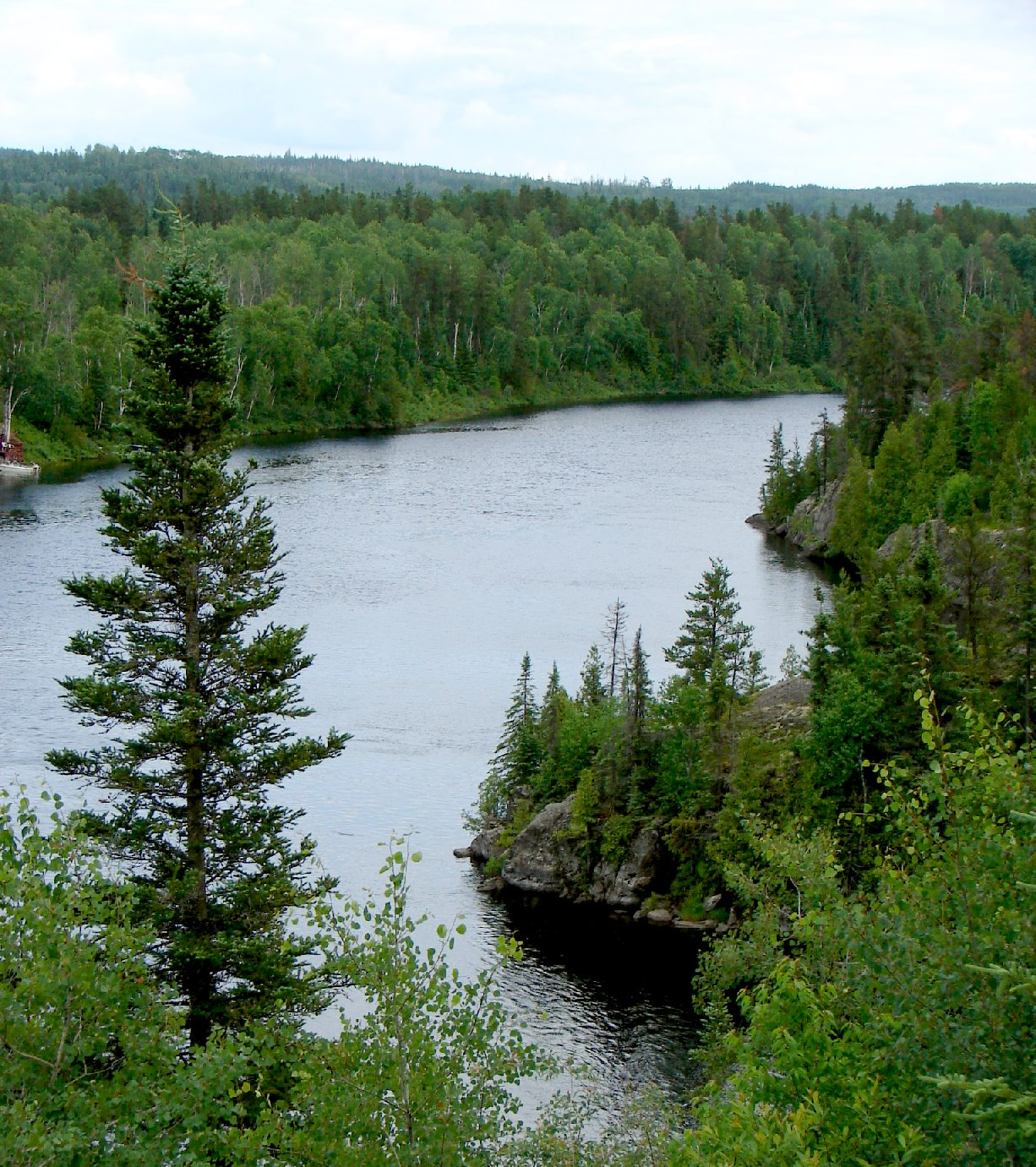
- Montreal River at Matachewan

- Location of the mouth of the Montreal River in Ontario

Location
- Country: Canada
- Province: Ontario
- District: Timiskaming

Physical characteristics
- Source: Smoothwater Lake
  - location: Timiskaming, Unorganized, West Part
  - coordinates: 47°25′30″N 80°41′25″W
  - elevation: 378 m (1,240 ft)
- Mouth: Lake Timiskaming
  - location: Timiskaming, Unorganized, West Part
  - coordinates: 47°08′20″N 79°27′15″W
  - elevation: 178.4 m (585 ft)
- Length: 220 km (140 mi)

Basin features
- Progression: Lake Timiskaming→ Ottawa River→ St. Lawrence River→ Gulf of St. Lawrence
- River system: Ottawa River drainage basin
- Tributaries
  - right: Lady Evelyn River, Makobe River

The Montreal River is a river in Timiskaming District, Ontario, Canada. It travels 220 kilometres (137 mi) from its source at Smoothwater Lake to its mouth at Lake Timiskaming on the Ottawa River. The river is a significant source of hydroelectricity.

== Course ==
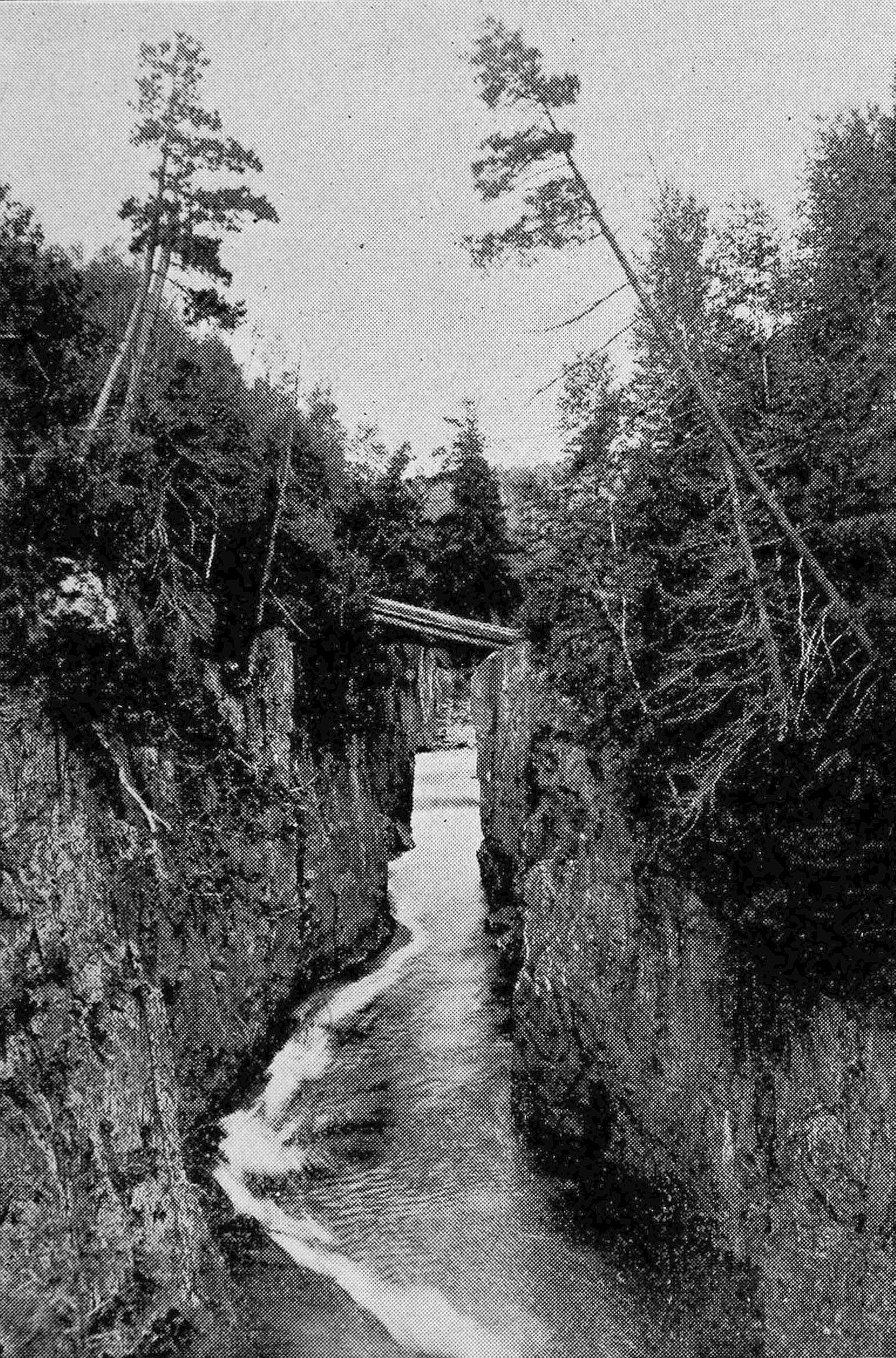
"The Notch", 1906

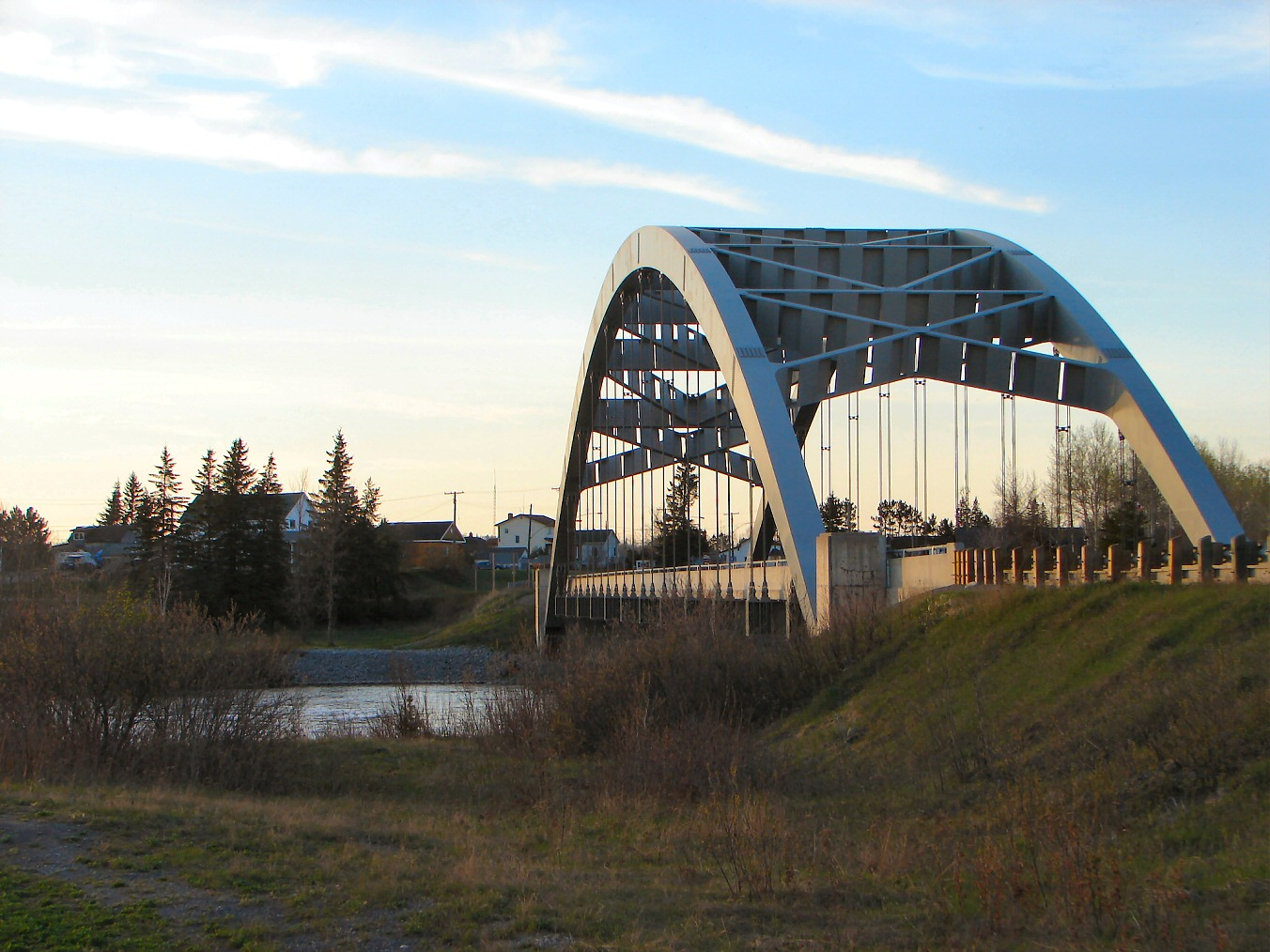
Sgt. Aubrey Cosens VC Memorial Bridge at Latchford

The Montreal River has an inverted check mark shape, first flowing 70 kilometres (43 mi) north east, then 150 kilometres (93 mi) south east to its mouth. It begins at Smoothwater Lake in Lady Evelyn-Smoothwater Provincial Park. Ishpatina Ridge, the highest point in Ontario, lies in the Montreal River drainage basin just south of Smoothwater Lake, and separates the headwaters of the Montreal River proper, to the northwest, and the headwaters of the tributary Lady Evelyn River, which joins far downstream, to the southeast.

The river heads north, takes in several tributaries and reaches Inlet Bay on Gowganda Lake and the community of Gowganda. The river exits the lake at Outlet Bay, passes under Ontario Highway 560 and continues northeast. It reaches The Forks at Matachewan and takes in the major left tributary West Montreal River. It continues northeast briefly to Fox Rapids, then turns southeast, passes under Ontario Highway 65, takes in the right tributary Sydney Creek and left tributary Council Creek and reaches the Ontario Power Generation (OPG) Indian Chute Generating Station and dam at Indian Chute Falls. The river continues southeast to the community of Elk Lake, takes in the right tributary Makobe River and again passes under both Highway 65 and Highway 560. The river continues southeast, passes through the Mountain Chutes, takes in the major right tributary Lady Evelyn River at the community of Mowat Landing, passes into Bay Lake and reaches the town of Latchford. The river is paralleled by Highway 65 for the stretch Matachewan to Latchford.

The river heads over the Latchford Dam and under the Sgt. Aubrey Cosens VC Memorial Bridge carrying Ontario Highway 11, attains OPG Hound Chute Generating Station and dam and further downstream Canadian Hydro Developers' Ragged Chute Generating Station and dam. The river flows over Fountain Falls and the Paugan Rapids, and enters the reservoir of the OPG Lower Notch Generating Station and dam. It then passes through the generating station to reach its mouth at Lake Timiskaming.

== Ecology ==
Two bird banding stations are located in the Montreal River drainage basin. One is at Mountain Chutes southeast of Elk Lake, and a second at Gillies Lake just northeast of Latchford.

== Tributaries ==
- Sandstone Creek (right)
- Giroux Creek (left)
- Hound Chute Creek (right)
- Gillies Creek (left)
- Loon Creek (left)
- Sucker Gut Creek (right)
- Gilchrist Creek (right)
- McLaren's Creek (left)
- Kitt Creek (right)
- Wadi's Creek (right)
- Lady Evelyn River (right)
- Moccasin Creek (right)
- Spray Creek (right)
- Barber Creek (right)
- Etwill Creek (right)
- Wabun Creek (left)
- Moosehorn Creek (right)
- Makobe River (right)
- Explorer Creek (right)
- Council Creek (left)
- Sydney Creek (right)
- Whiskeyjack Creek (left)
- West Montreal River (left)
- Miller Creek (right)
- Gowganda Lake
- Haines Creek (right)
- Okinada Creek (left)
- Smoothwater Lake
  - Smith Creek

== See also ==
- List of rivers of Ontario
