= Solace Provincial Park =

Provincial park in Ontario

- IUCN category II (national park)
- Location within Ontario
- Interactive map of Solace Provincial Park
- Location: Sudbury District, Ontario, Canada
- Coordinates: 47°11′20″N 80°41′25″W
- Area: 5,943.00 ha (22.9461 sq mi)
- Designation: Waterway
- Established: 1989
- Named for: Solace Lake
- Governing body: Ontario Parks
- Website: www.ontarioparks.com/park/solace

Solace Provincial Park is a remote provincial park in Sudbury District, Ontario, Canada. It was established in 1985 and protects a series of lakes that provide backcountry canoeing opportunities. It is characterized by boreal forest, mostly jack pine conifer forest with mixed forest including white birch. The roadless park, with topography and scenery similar to the adjacent Lady Evelyn-Smoothwater Provincial Park, is considered as "one of the most isolated, wild places in Ontario".

The park contains a chain of narrow north–south-oriented lakes such as Selkirk, Solace, Maggie, Pilgrim, and Bluesucker Lakes, that are separated by steep forest-covered ridges. Canoeists can travel between these lakes with rugged portages over the ridges. Although scenic and for those seeking quietude, the canoe routes through the park are considered by Hap Wilson as "challenging" with "hefty" portages. The routes form part of the 2,400-kilometre-long (1,500 mi) network of portages and waterways in the Temagami area.

It is an operating park, requiring permits for wilderness camping. Facilities include 10 backcountry campsites. The park can be used for recreational activities such as boating, backcountry camping, canoeing, fishing, swimming, and hunting. It is only accessible via canoe or floatplane.

The park is part of a chain of provincial parks and conservation reserves in the Temagami area. It forms a natural corridor between the Sturgeon River (in the adjacent Sturgeon River Provincial Park) to the west and Florence Lake (in Lady Evelyn-Smoothwater Provincial Park) to the east. Furthermore, it borders on North Yorston Conservation Reserve to the north, which protects old-growth white pine stands and part of the headwaters of the Sturgeon, Lady Evelyn, Yorston, and Pilgrim Rivers.
