= Obabika River =

- Location within Ontario

Location
- Country: Canada
- Province: Ontario
- District: Sudbury

Physical characteristics
- Source: Obabika Lake
  - coordinates: 47°06′30″N 80°18′15″W
- Mouth: Sturgeon River
  - coordinates: 46°57′38″N 80°26′40″W

Basin features
- Tributaries
  - left: Wawiagama River
  - right: Nasmith Creek

The Obabika River is located in central Ontario, Canada. It is south of Lady Evelyn-Smoothwater Provincial Park and west of Lake Temagami, within Sudbury District. It flows from Obabika Lake in a south-westerly direction and drains into the Sturgeon River. The Obabika River is remote and surrounded by undeveloped wilderness.

The river is characterized by long meandering sections through clay and sand valleys alternated by sections through eroded bedrock and marshes. The lower Obabika River is rather wide with several oxbow ponds, and obstructed by occasional log jams. Although the current is strong, the only noteworthy rapids occur immediately before its confluence with the Sturgeon River.

With its steady current and few portages, the Obabika River is a popular canoe route within the Temagami region, linking Lake Temagami and Lady Evelyn Lake via Obabika Lake to the Sturgeon River. It is part of the traditional indigenous travel network called "nastawgan", which has changed little over many centuries.

== Obabika River Provincial Park ==
The full length of the Obabika River is protected by and within the boundaries of the Obabika River Provincial Park. This park was created in 1989 and expanded in 2002 to 205 square kilometres (79 sq mi). Like most other waterway parks in Ontario, there are no services provided other than portage and campsite maintenance. This park is suitable for backcountry canoeing, nature exploration and wildlife viewing.

In addition to the waters and shores of the Obabika River, the park also includes the southern portion of Lady Evelyn Lake and the Obabika Old-Growth Forest bordering on the north side of Obabika Lake, straddling across the boundaries of the Sudbury, Nipissing, and Timiskaming Districts.

== See also ==
- List of rivers of Ontario
