= Sturgeon River Provincial Park =

Provincial park in Ontario, Canada

- IUCN category II (national park)
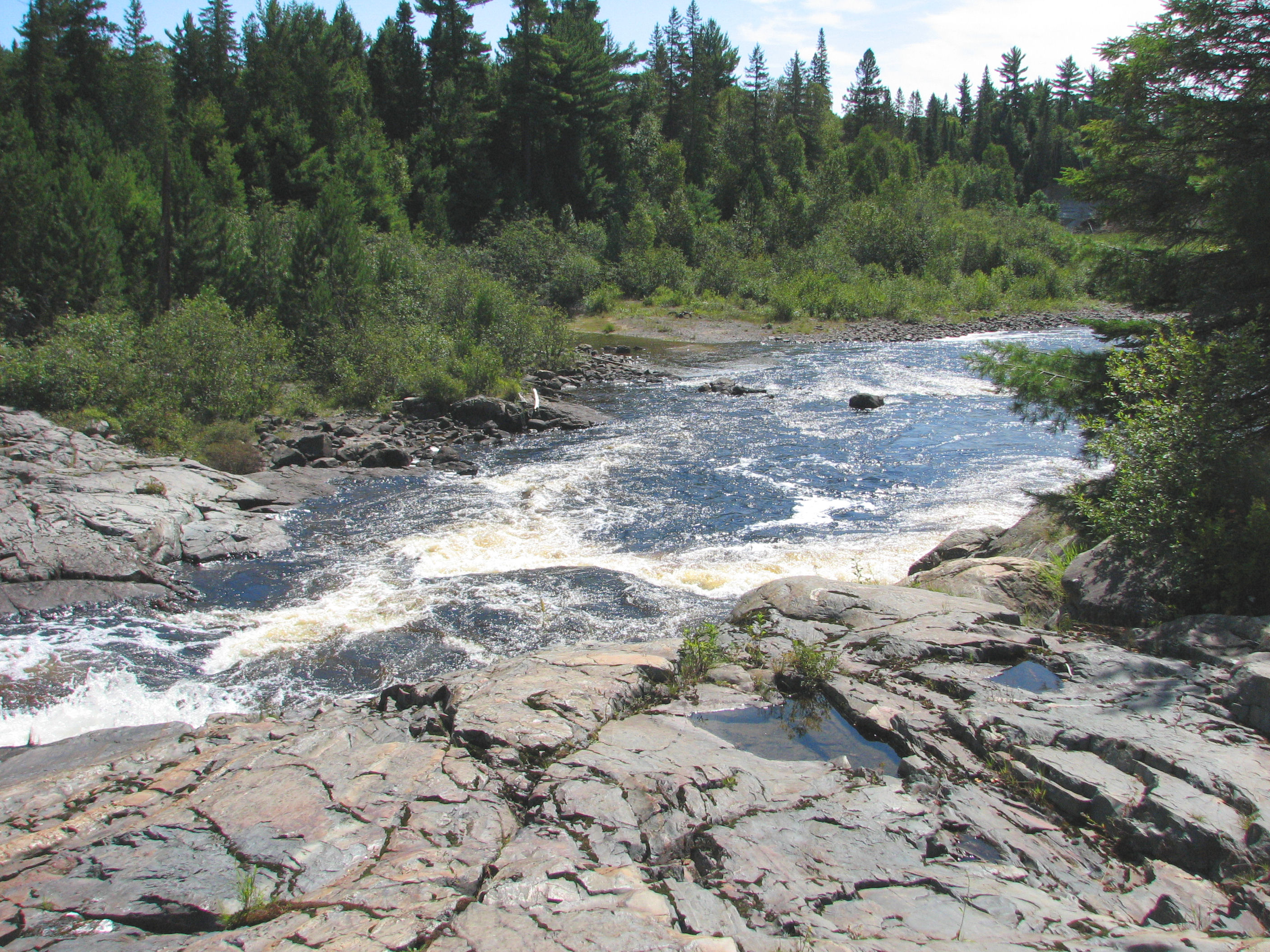
- Upper Goose Falls

- Location within Ontario
- Interactive map of Sturgeon River Provincial Park
- Location: Sudbury District, Ontario, Canada
- Nearest city: Greater Sudbury
- Coordinates: 46°58′13″N 80°27′46″W
- Length: 70 km (43 mi)
- Area: 7,985 ha (30.83 sq mi)
- Designation: Waterway
- Established: 1989
- Governing body: Ontario Parks
- Website: www.ontarioparks.ca/park/sturgeonriver

The Sturgeon River Provincial Park is a provincial park in northern Ontario, Canada, that protects about 70 kilometres (43 mi) long section of the Sturgeon River and its banks, from Woods Lake (at the boundary of Lady Evelyn-Smoothwater Park in Timiskaming District) to the Sudbury-Nipissing District boundary. It was established in 1989 and expanded in 2005. It protects outstanding water routes that provide recreational canoe camping opportunities. Other activities include hunting and fishing.

It used to have an area of 33.5 square kilometres (12.9 sq mi) and the park ended south of the Obabika River and Lower Goose Falls. It was extended south in 2005 and now has an area of 79.85 square kilometres (30.83 sq mi). The river itself is 177 kilometres (110 mi) long and continues until it empties at the north shore of and into Lake Nipissing. The town of Sturgeon Falls is located on the river about 3 kilometres (1.9 mi) north of its mouth.

The park is one of the several provincial parks in the Temagami area. It forms a natural corridor with the adjacent Lady Evelyn-Smoothwater Provincial Park, Solace Provincial Park, Chiniguchi Waterway Provincial Park, and Obabika River Provincial Park. All parks are managed by Ontario Parks.

== Features ==
The river features a continually changing landscape, from the Temagami highlands, with bedrock outcrops and long slender lakes to narrow river channels, rapids and shallows, eventually turning to sandy shores.

This river is only suitable for experienced backcountry canoeists. With some 65 rapids, canoeists should be able to portage and/or have whitewater canoeing skills. Detailed maps for navigation are essential. Despite its remote setting, it is an operating park, requiring permits for camping (not for day use). The only facilities are 35 backcountry campsites.

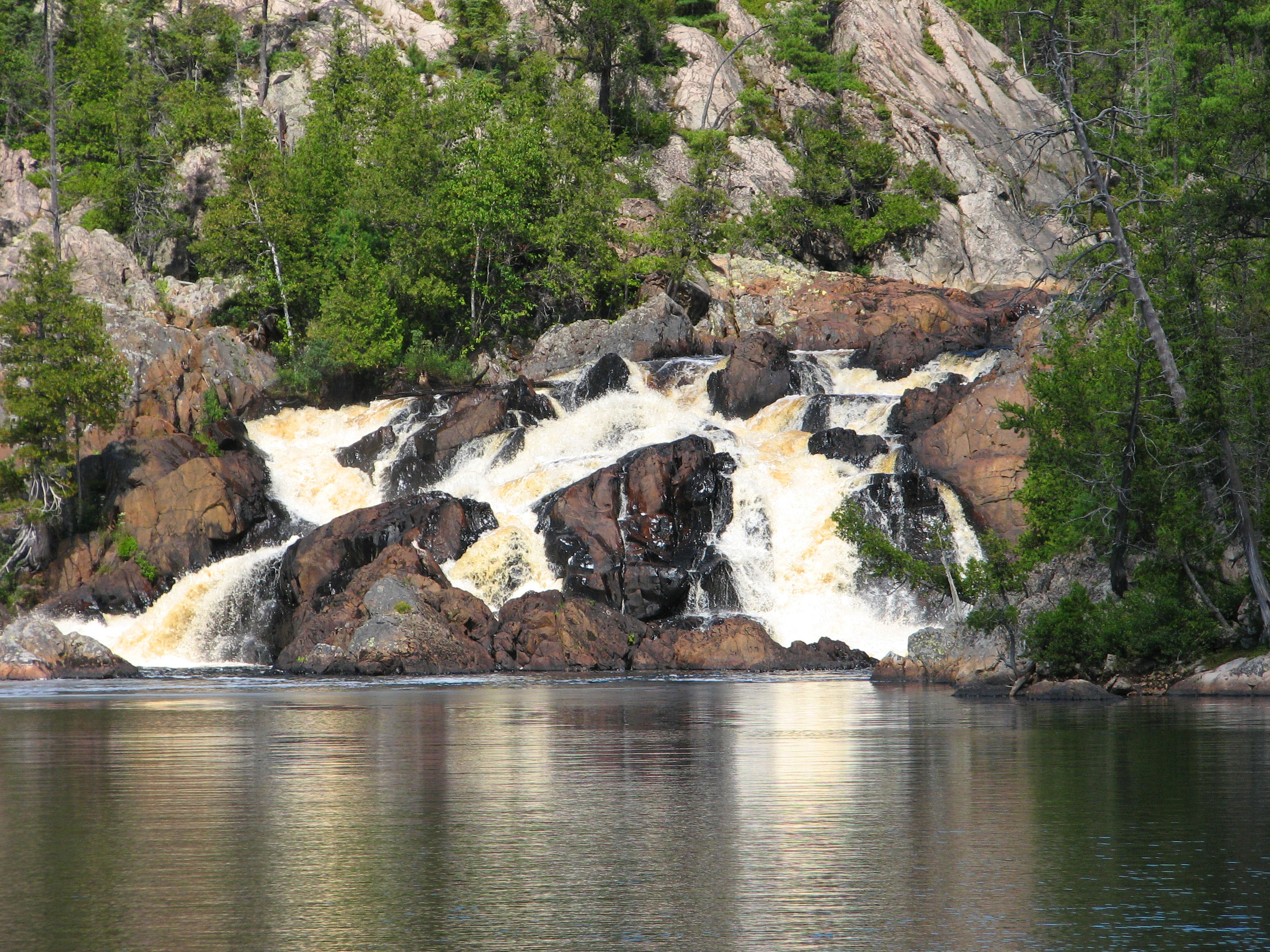
Kettle Falls
