= Ishpatina Ridge =

Mountain ridge in Ontario, Canada

- Location within Ontario

Highest point
- Elevation: 693 m (2,274 ft)
- Prominence: 394 m (1,293 ft)
- Listing: Canadian Subnational High Points 11th
- Coordinates: 47°19′00″N 80°45′00″W

Geography
- Location: 90 km north of Sudbury, Ontario in Ellis Township, Sudbury District
- Parent range: Canadian Shield, unnamed range
- Topo map: NTS 41P7 Smoothwater Lake

Climbing
- Easiest route: Hike

Ishpatina Ridge is the highest point of land in the Canadian province of Ontario, at an estimated 693 m (2,274 ft) above sea level. Ishpatina Ridge rises approximately 300 m (984 ft) above the immediate area. It was only truly recognized as Ontario's highest point after topographical mapping by the Government of Canada revealed this fact in the 1970s. Before then, the more popular Maple Mountain was thought to be higher.

The ridge lies in Lady Evelyn-Smoothwater Provincial Park. Due to its remote location, Ishpatina Ridge is a challenge to reach. The closest major highway, Highway 560, is more than 30 km north. There are a few logging roads and trails in the remote area, but they are difficult to travel in poor weather. The most popular approach route to Ishpatina is by canoe/portage via a logging road to the south out of the town of Capreol north of Sudbury. While a northern route exists (out of Gowganda, the nearest community), there are numerous portages making it particularly onerous. This route has traditionally been used for a winter-time approach by ski/snowshoe. Historically, a fire tower atop the ridge was staffed by forest workers and they would have been ferried to the site by float plane.

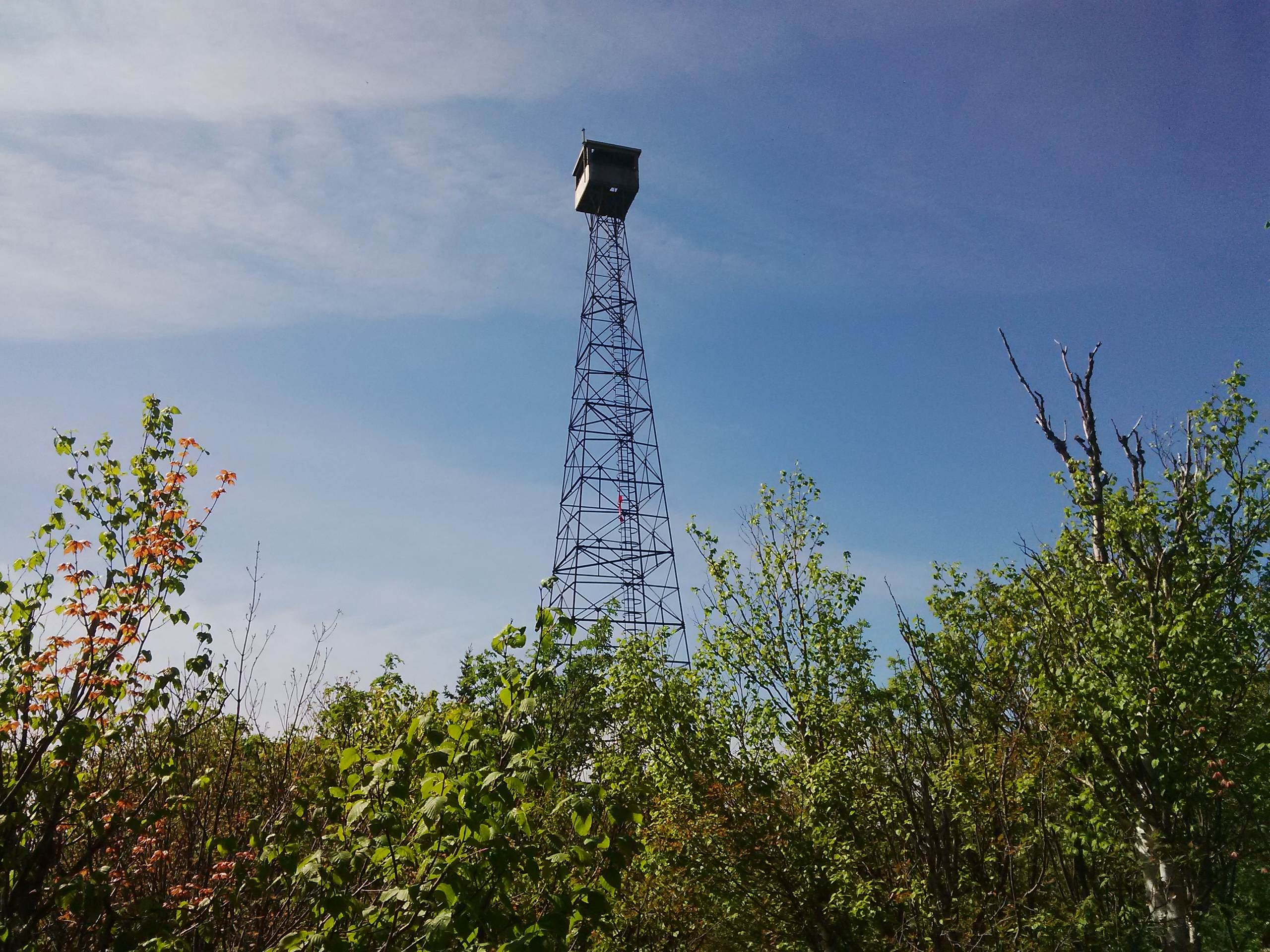
Ellis Fire Tower, 2015

The name "Ishpatina" comes from an Ojibwe language word ishpadinaa, meaning "high place/ridge". Spadina Avenue in Toronto and the city of Ishpeming, Michigan derive their names from the same word.

Although the Ishpatina Ridge is the highest point in Ontario, at least one other geographic feature, Maple Mountain (approximately 25 km to the east) has greater prominence, 37 m (121 ft) higher than Ishpatina Ridge's rise over Scarecrow Lake.

An abandoned firetower, often referred to as the Ellis Tower, is still standing on the highest section of the Ridge (left). The original tower was an 80 ft (24 m) structure erected in 1930. The successor, currently standing, is 100 ft (30 m) high and was abandoned in the 1960s. The towerman would have resided in a cabin on the shore of Scarecrow Lake and would have hiked a 3.5 km trail daily taking approximately two hours to the summit and a little over one hour to descend again.

Located between Tower Peak and the North Peak, the Ishpatina Canyon is one of the deepest in Ontario. The elevation of Tower Peak is 693 m (2,274 ft), the bottom of the Canyon is at 533 m (1,749 ft) and the North Peak at 686 m (2,251 ft) above sea level. The canyon is nearly twice as deep as Ouimet Canyon, often considered Ontario's deepest. However, the more gradual descent into the canyon hides the fact.

The ridge was featured on an interactive web series called The Peakbaggers.

Taken by a hiker from the top of the abandoned Ellis Fire Tower, atop Ishpatina Ridge in June, 2015

== See also ==
- List of highest points of Canadian provinces and territories
- Temagami Magnetic Anomaly
