= Helen Falls =

Waterfall in Ontario, Canada

Coordinates: 47°17′29″N 80°20′02″W

Helen Falls is a waterfall on the Lady Evelyn River within Lady Evelyn-Smoothwater Provincial Park in Northeastern Ontario, Canada. The falls are the highest on the Lady Evelyn River with a height more than 25 m (82 ft).

== See also ==
- List of waterfalls
- List of waterfalls of Canada
