= Sgt. Aubrey Cosens VC Memorial Bridge =

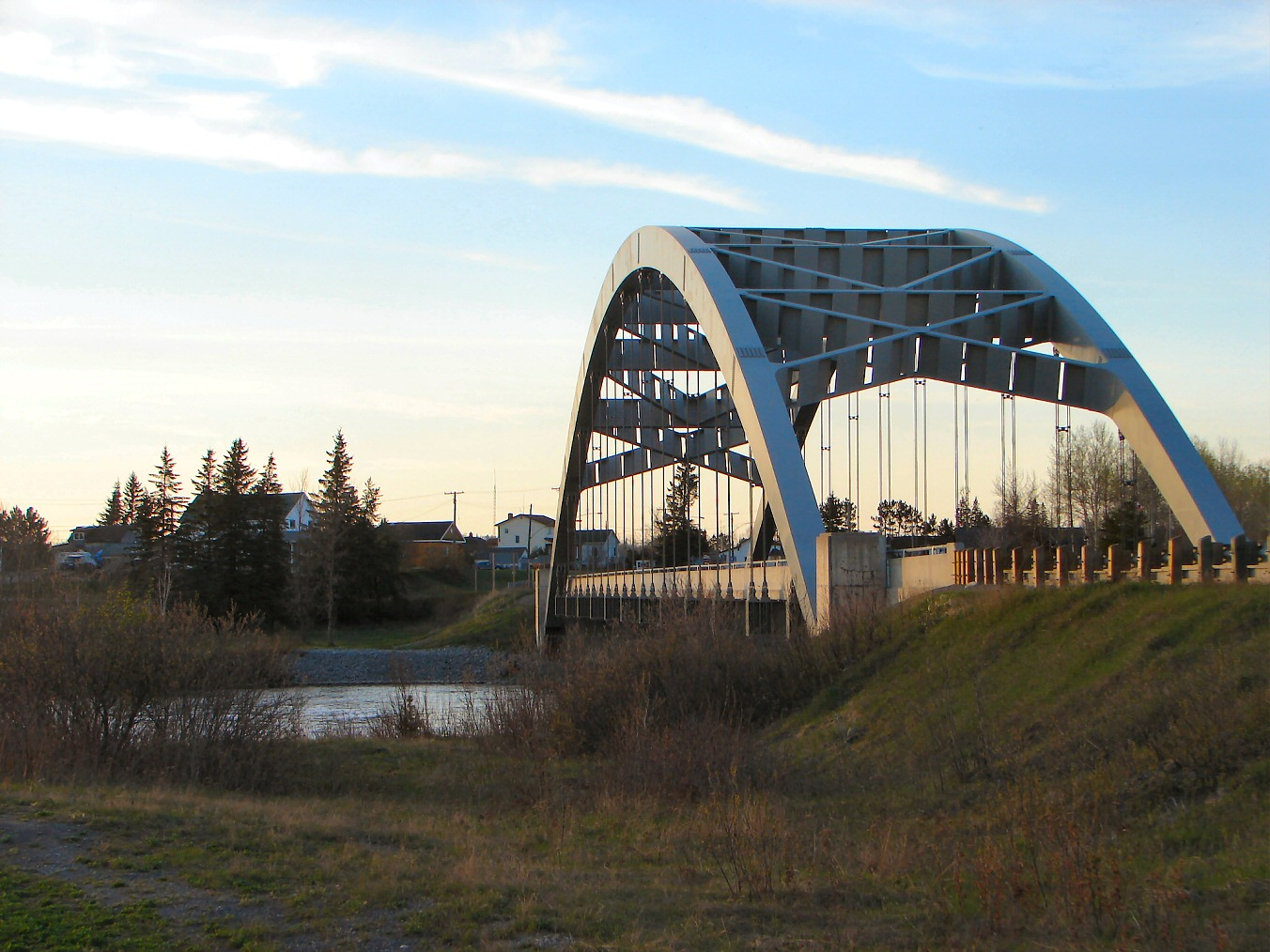
- Sgt. Aubrey Cosens VC Memorial Bridge over the Montreal River.
- Coordinates: 47°19′20″N 79°48′35″W
- Carries: 2 lanes Ontario Highway 11/Trans-Canada Highway
- Crosses: Montreal River
- Locale: Latchford, Ontario
- Other name(s): Latchford Bridge
- Maintained by: Ontario Ministry of Transportation

History
- Opened: October 1960

The Sgt. Aubrey Cosens VC Memorial Bridge is a road bridge in Latchford, Ontario, which carries Ontario Highway 11, a branch of the Trans-Canada Highway system, across the Montreal River.

== History ==
The bridge was constructed in October 1960. Prior to the bridge's construction, Highway 11 traffic crossed the river by driving directly over the nearby Latchford Dam.

The bridge was renamed in 1986 in honour of Aubrey Cosens, a military sergeant with The Queen's Own Rifles of Canada and Victoria Cross recipient from the area. Members of The Queen's Own Rifles, and the Argyll and Sutherland Highlanders of Canada(A&SHofC), Cosens' original regiment, were present at the official unveiling. Just a few months earlier, provincial Transportation Minister Ed Fulton had refused the town's request to name the bridge for Cosens on the grounds that government policy was to not name bridges after people, despite the fact that the government had just recently renamed the Burlington Bay Skyway in Burlington and Hamilton for former cabinet minister James Allan.

== Failure and reconstruction ==
On January 14, 2003 there was a partial failure of the bridge, resulting in the closure of the highway. At approximately 2:45 p.m., as a transport truck was passing over the bridge, several rivets suddenly tore away from the support cables, causing the northwest corner of the bridge deck to drop approximately two metres. There were no casualties in the incident, as the truck driver made it safely off the bridge.

The collapse forced Highway 11 traffic to detour, resulting in abnormally high traffic loads being pushed onto routes such as Ontario Highway 65, Quebec Route 101, Ontario Highway 63 and Ontario Highway 533, or to drive as far as Latchford, walk across the dam and have another vehicle pick them up on the other side. Ontario Northland also instituted a special train service between Temagami and New Liskeard for the duration of the interruption.

A temporary one-lane Bailey bridge, which opened two weeks after the incident, was immediately constructed to carry traffic on the highway; due to the expected water levels on the Montreal River once ice and snow began to melt in the spring, however, a second temporary bridge then had to be constructed for the duration of the original bridge's reconstruction.

According to the Ministry of Transportation's final report, the failure was caused by fatigue fracture of three steel hanger rods on the northwest side of the bridge. The report also recommended a number of improvements to the ministry's design and inspection practices to prevent future failures of this type.

Following reconstruction, the bridge resumed service in 2005. Each hanger rod was replaced with four cable wires, to provide greater stability in the event of a wire failure.

== See also ==
- List of bridges in Canada
