= Obabika Old-Growth Forest =

Old-growth forest in Ontario, Canada

Coordinates: 47°08′30″N 80°17′00″W

Obabika old-growth forest is an Eastern White Pine and Red Pine dominated old-growth forest at the north end of Obabika Lake, just west of the Temagami region of Ontario, Canada. At 2,400 hectares (5,900 acres) in size, it is commonly considered to be the largest remaining white pine dominated old-growth forest in the world. It is also sometimes called Chee-Skon Lake old-growth forest, or Wakimika Triangle old-growth forest. This area was slated for logging in 1989 and was protected largely as a result of a blockade on Red Squirrel Road in which 344 protestors were arrested, including future Ontario premier Bob Rae. The oldest trees in the Obabika old-growth forest are confirmed to be at least 375 years old, but a diversity of age classes occur in this forest. Another important feature of the area is the spirit rock, a column of rock on the shore of Chee-Skon Lake that is of spiritual significance to the Teme-Augama Anishnabai people.

The Obabika old-growth forest is protected within the Obabika River Provincial Park.

The forest is accessed by more than 6 km of trails, but the trail-head can only be reached by canoe.
