= Makobe River =

- Location of the mouth of the Makobe River in Ontario

Location
- Country: Canada
- Province: Ontario
- Region: Northeastern Ontario
- District: Timiskaming

Physical characteristics
- Source: Makobe Lake
  - location: Whitson Township
  - coordinates: 47°28′16″N 80°23′42″W
  - elevation: 367 m (1,204 ft)
- Mouth: Montreal River
  - location: Elk Lake
  - coordinates: 47°43′54″N 80°19′55″W
  - elevation: 280 m (920 ft)

Basin features
- River system: Saint Lawrence River drainage basin

The Makobe River is a river in northeastern Ontario, Canada. It is in the Saint Lawrence River drainage basin, and is a left tributary of the Montreal River.

== Course ==
The river begins at Makobe Lake in Lady Evelyn-Smoothwater Provincial Park in geographic Whitson Township in Unorganized West Timiskaming District and flows north into Banks Lake and into geographic Banks Township. It continues north, entering 1,420-hectare (3,500-acre) Makobe-Grays River Provincial Park (a waterway park along both sides of the river) and straddling the border with geographic Wallis Township adjacent to the west. The river continues north, enters geographic Willet Township, takes in the left tributary Crane Creek, then the right tributary Cucumber Creek, and enters incorporated James Township. It takes in the left tributary Bear River, exits Makobe-Grays River Provincial Park just before the community of Elk Lake, and reaches its mouth at the Montreal River. The Montreal River flows via Lake Timiskaming and the Ottawa River to the Saint Lawrence River.

The river flows over Canadian Shield bedrock through a narrow north-south valley, characterized by a number of small waterfalls and rapids. At Alexander Lake, the river widens out into shoreline wetlands with shrub and grass fens and black ash swamp.

In spring, the river's high water level create numerous Class I and II rapids, suitable for whitewater canoeing; while it becomes mostly flatwater with some moving water in the summer, requiring lining and numerous portages when canoeing.

== Provincial parks ==
Makobe-Grays River Provincial Park
- IUCN category II (national park)
- Location: Timiskaming District
- Coordinates: 47°37′34″N 80°23′38″W
- Area: 1,427.00 ha (5.5097 sq mi)
- Designation: Waterway
- Established: 1985
- Governing body: Ontario Parks
- Website: www.ontarioparks.com/park/makobegraysriver

Almost the entire Makobe River is protected inside provincial parks: most of it in Makobe-Grays River Provincial Park, and its headwaters and source in Lady Evelyn-Smoothwater Provincial Park.

The Makobe-Grays River Provincial Park is a linear waterway park that includes a 200 metres (660 ft) wide strip of land on both sides of the Makobe River (although the park is also named after the Grays River, this river is entirely within Lady Evelyn-Smoothwater Provincial Park). It was established in 1985 and protects a remote whitewater river that is used for wilderness canoe camping. The park's notable features include numerous small waterfalls, scenic ravines, and fishing opportunities.

It is an operating park, requiring permits for wilderness camping. Facilities include 9 backcountry campsites. The park can be used for recreational activities such as boating, backcountry camping, canoeing, fishing, swimming, and hunting.

== Natural history ==
Besides Lady Evelyn-Smoothwater Provincial Park and Makobe-Grays River Provincial Park, the drainage basin also includes Makobe Grays Ice Margin Conservation Reserve, a 903-hectare (2,230-acre) reserve on either side of the river around and upstream of the Crane Creek inflow, that protects "unique spruce-topped moraine ridges" and "unique jack pine and poplar communities found on the Makobe Grays end moraine".
