= Sturgeon River House Museum =

Muséum Sturgeon River House Museum
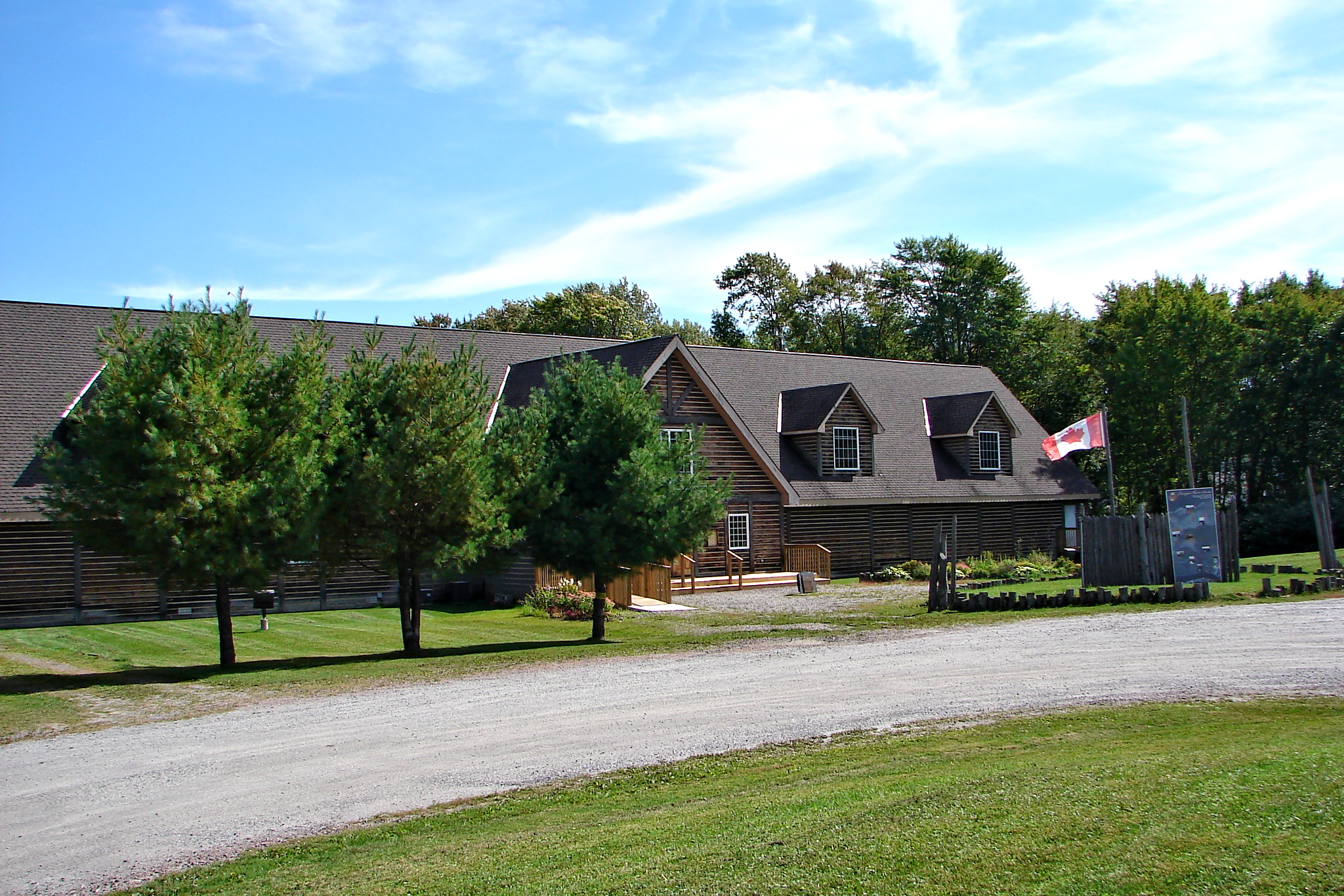
- Established: 1967
- Location: Sturgeon Falls, Ontario
- Coordinates: 46°20′17″N 79°58′34″W
- Type: Community museum
- Collection size: abt. 1 000
- Visitors: abt. 10 000
- Owner: Municipality of West Nipissing
- Website: www.westnipissing.ca/culture-recreation/sturgeon-river-house-museum/

The Sturgeon River House Museum (SRH, French: Musée Sturgeon River House) is a community museum of Canadiana and natural history based in Sturgeon Falls, Ontario, Canada. It promotes and preserves the cultural and natural heritage of the population of the municipality of West Nipissing. They have the mandate of presenting the fur trade era from 1623 to 1879 and pioneer life in West Nipissing between 1878 and 1939, and also the cultural contributions of the three pioneer groups of the West Nipissing region (First Nations, French, English). The museum also owns 4 kilometres (2.5 mi) of low-impact nature trails in its Theodore Fouriezos Wetlands Park.

== History ==
The museum is located on the authentic Hudson's Bay Company trading post site on the west bank of the Sturgeon River, about 2.5 kilometres (1.6 mi) from Lake Nipissing. The post operated there from the first half of the 19th century until 1882. The site was sold to various settlers and the post fell into decay.

The museum was founded in 1967, as a community Centennial project. The original planning committee included the now amalgamated Township of Springer, the Town of Cache Bay, and Sturgeon Falls Secondary School, along with support of the Governments of Ontario and Canada.

=== Timeline ===
1967 to 1980 : The museum is built and open on a seasonal basis. It is staffed by volunteers from the region. The site includes a rendition of a log Hudson's Bay Company trading post enclosed by a log palisade. In 1980, a house built in 1898 was transported to the museum site after being donated from the Major family, one of the local pioneer families. At this time the collection contained about 100 objects.

1980 to 1990 : The Township of Springer formed an advisory Museum Committee, in order to oversee the general management of the site, and to concentrate on building a collection. In 1984, about 20 volunteers created a not for profit association (French : Association des Volontaires du Musée). The AVM's mission is to raise funds for the development of the museum. The J.P. Charles family donated a part of their family blacksmith collection to the museum. A log building was dedicated to the storage of the collection. In 1986, a small administration building was built on the site in order to better manage the museum, it was renovated two years later in 1988 to include its first exhibit room and an accessible entrance. In 1989, a stage was built as well as an artefact storage space for the burgeoning collection.

1990 to 1994 : The municipality dedicated one full-time employee to the museum, the museum's first full-time curator. The museum is open year-round. In 1992, the AVM purchased the "Trappers' Museum" collection and donates it to the museum. The collection was composed of taxidermy and trapping tools and equipment. In 1993, the museum hired a full-time administrative assistant to better manage the museum.

1995 to 1999 : In 1995, the museum received a donation of a 75 acres (30 ha) land parcel across the road from the Theodore Fouriezos family, which became the Theodore Fouriezos Wetland Park. The parcel adjoins local crown land, and is composed mostly of wetlands and contains an important cranberrybog. The museum developed a 5-year plan to promote the museum and trails as a major tourist attraction. A few years later, the museum received approval for a $1,600,000 (Adjusted for inflation 2014 : 2,221,633.55) capital project for a site upgrade and expansion, the original buildings were torn down except the stage and storage building which will adjoin a new building, the construction took two years, completed in 2000. During the construction of the new building, the municipality hired a full-time naturalist, Serge Ducharme. The museum received in 1999 100 acres (40 ha) of land for the wetland park. The museum re-opened in June 2000.

2000 to 2002: Ready for the re-opening in June 2000, the museum's permanent exhibit on the fur trade and local furbearers was opened. In September 2002, the semi-permanent exhibit on French Pioneers (French : Les pionniers de la langue française du Nipissing Ouest) paid homage and tells the story of the first settlers.

2020– The museum closed for the duration of the COVID-19 pandemic.

== Collections and exhibits ==
=== Collections ===
The museum's collection is composed of the following:

- Trapping tools and equipment
- Taxidermy
- Animal husbandry and agriculture tools and equipment
- Blacksmithing tools and equipment
- Canadiana
- Local art

=== Archives ===
The museum has a unique archive that contains, among other things, tax records from local defunct townships, newspapers, books, encyclopedias, books of religious nature and pictures donated from local residents.

=== Exhibits ===
The museum has two exhibits,

- Permanent exhibit : Trapping and the fur trade
- Semi-Permanent exhibit : French Pioneers (French : Les pionniers de la langue française du Nipissing Ouest)
- Temporary/Seasonal exhibits : Remembrance Day, Commercial Fishing Industry, Cranberry Festival.
