= List of highest points of Canadian provinces and territories =

Highest points in Canadian political regions

This is a list of the highest points of the ten provinces and three territories of Canada, ordered by height.

== Highest Points ==
Rank	Province or territory	Peak	Range or other region	Height	Coordinates	Image
1	Yukon	Mount Logan	Saint Elias Mountains	5,959 metres (19,551 ft)	60°34′02″N 140°24′10″W	
2	British Columbia	Mount Fairweather (Note: Fairweather Mountain is the officially gazetted name, but Mount Fairweather is the common usage. Mount Fairweather is on the boundary with Alaska, with only the summit and approximately 1/3 of the peak's massif within British Columbia. The highest summit completely within British Columbia is Mount Waddington in the Pacific Ranges of the Coast Mountains, the third-highest mountain in the province after Fairweather and Quincy Adams.)	Saint Elias Mountains	4,663 metres (15,299 ft)	58°54′23″N 137°31′36″W	
3	Alberta	Mount Columbia (Note: Because it is on the Continental Divide of the Americas, Mount Columbia is in British Columbia as well as Alberta)	Rocky Mountains	3,747 metres (12,293 ft)	52°08′51″N 117°26′26″W	
4	Northwest Territories	Mount Nirvana (Note: Nirvana is the unofficial name of this mountain and shows on alpine literature as such, as of 2008 the Canadian Government still refers to it as "unnamed peak")	Mackenzie Mountains	2,773 metres (9,098 ft)	61°52′29″N 127°40′49″W	
5	Nunavut	Barbeau Peak	British Empire Range	2,616 metres (8,583 ft)	81°54′30″N 075°01′30″W	
6	Newfoundland and Labrador	Mount Caubvick (Note: This peak, which lies on the border between the two provinces, is known as Mount Caubvick in Newfoundland and Labrador and Mont D'Iberville in Quebec. The summit of the mountain is entirely within Labrador, about 10 m (33 ft) from the provincial border)	Torngat Mountains	1,652 metres (5,420 ft)	58°53′01″N 063°42′57″W	
6	Quebec	Mont D'Iberville	Torngat Mountains	1,652 metres (5,420 ft)	58°53′01″N 063°42′57″W	
8	Saskatchewan	Unnamed point	Cypress Upland	1,392 metres (4,567 ft)	49°33′06″N 109°59′14″W	
9	Manitoba	Baldy Mountain	Duck Mountains	832 metres (2,730 ft)	51°28′07″N 100°43′42″W	
10	New Brunswick	Mount Carleton	Appalachian Mountains	817 metres (2,680 ft)	47°22′41″N 066°52′33″W	
11	Ontario	Ishpatina Ridge (Note: The main peak of Maple Mountain has a higher vertical rise over the surrounding landscape, 37 m (121 ft) higher than the Ishpatina Ridge rising over Scarecrow Lake)	Temagami	693 metres (2,274 ft)	47°19′28″N 080°44′21″W	
12	Nova Scotia	White Hill	Cape Breton Highlands	532 metres (1,745 ft)	46°42′15″N 060°36′00″W	
13	Prince Edward Island	Springton Peak	Queens County	138.2 metres (453 ft)	46°20′00″N 063°25′00″W	

== Lowest points ==
Since there is no land area of Canada that is below sea level, the lowest elevation of Canada is at any point along its maritime coast, and all provinces and territories except Alberta and Saskatchewan have a maritime coast. The shore of Lake Athabasca, which straddles Alberta and Saskatchewan, is Saskatchewan's lowest dry point (213 m (699 ft) above sea level). The Slave River (which drains Lake Athabasca) flows from northeastern Alberta into the Northwest Territories and is Alberta's lowest point at the N.W.T. border (152 m (499 ft) above sea level). However, the False Creek Tunnel, part of the Canada Line rail-based transit system in Vancouver, at 29 m (95 ft) below sea level, is the lowest publicly accessible point in Canada.
