= Lady Evelyn River =

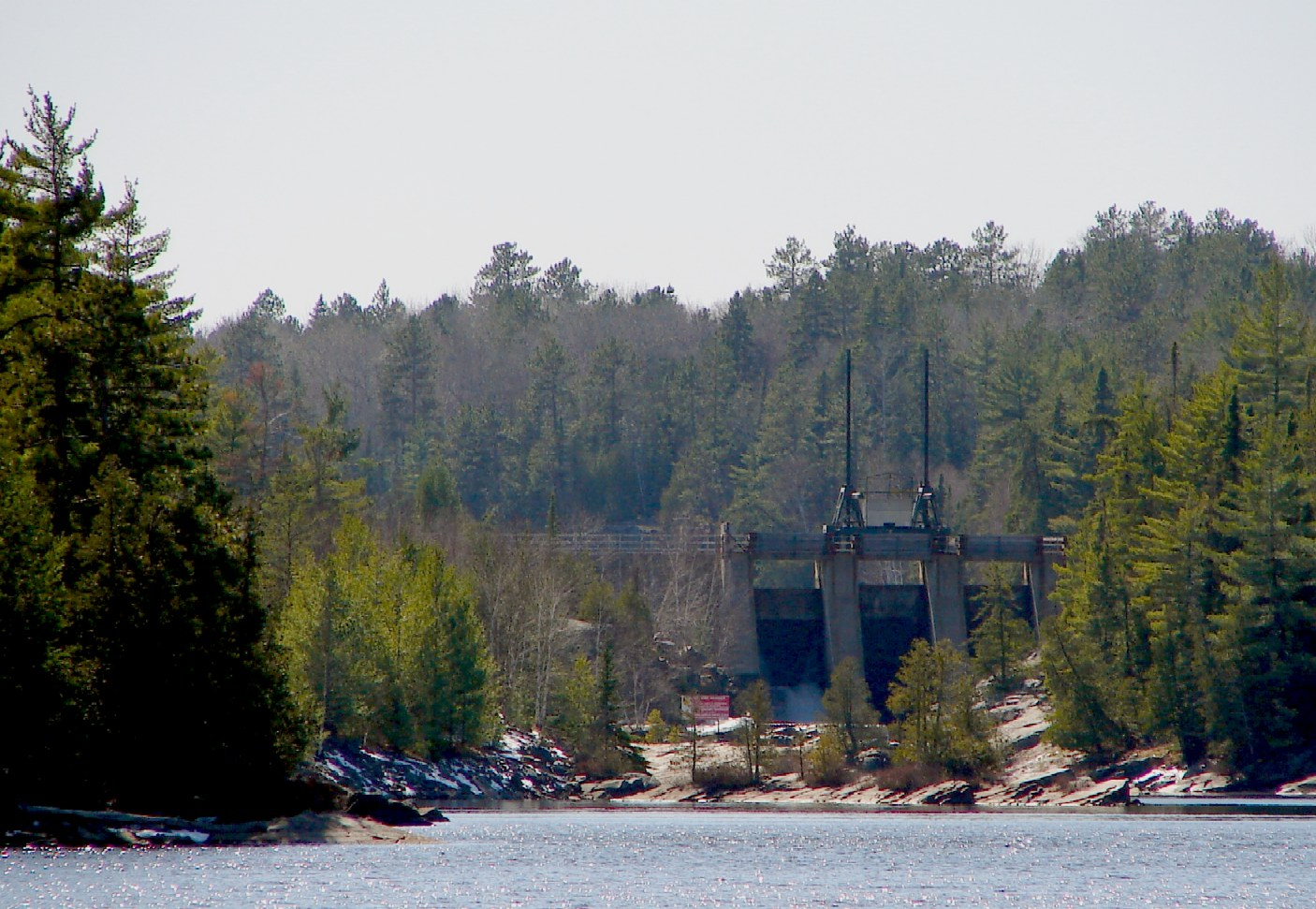
- Dam at the mouth of the Lady Evelyn River

- Location of the mouth of the Lady Evelyn River in Ontario

Location
- Country: Canada
- Province: Ontario
- Districts: Nipissing; Sudbury; Timiskaming

Physical characteristics
- Source confluence: North Lady Evelyn River and South Lady Evelyn River
  - location: Timiskaming, Unorganized, West Part
  - coordinates: 47°20′50″N 80°29′05″W
  - elevation: 360 m (1,180 ft)
- Mouth: Montreal River
  - location: Mowat Landing
  - coordinates: 47°27′47″N 79°59′16″W
  - elevation: 274 m (899 ft)

The Lady Evelyn River is a river in Nipissing, Sudbury and Timiskaming Districts, Ontario, Canada.

The river begins at the confluence of the North and South Lady Evelyn Rivers and flows to its mouth at the Montreal River. It lies mostly in Lady Evelyn-Smoothwater Provincial Park, and mostly within Timiskaming District, with the exception of a short portion of the South Branch at its most southern stretch, which lies in northeastern Sudbury District, and of the southernmost tip of Lady Evelyn Lake, which lies in northwestern Nipissing District. Numerous waterfalls are found along the Lady Evelyn River, such as Frank's Falls. The most impressive and highest is Helen Falls where water cascades from a height more than 25 m (82 ft).

== See also ==
- List of rivers of Ontario

== Sources ==
- "Lady Evelyn River". Geographical Names Data Base. Natural Resources Canada.
- "Topographic Map sheets 31M5, 41P7, 41P8". Atlas of Canada. Natural Resources Canada. 2010-02-04. Archived from the original on 2009-01-22.
