= Obabika Lake (Northeastern Ontario) =

Lake in Northeastern Ontario, Canada

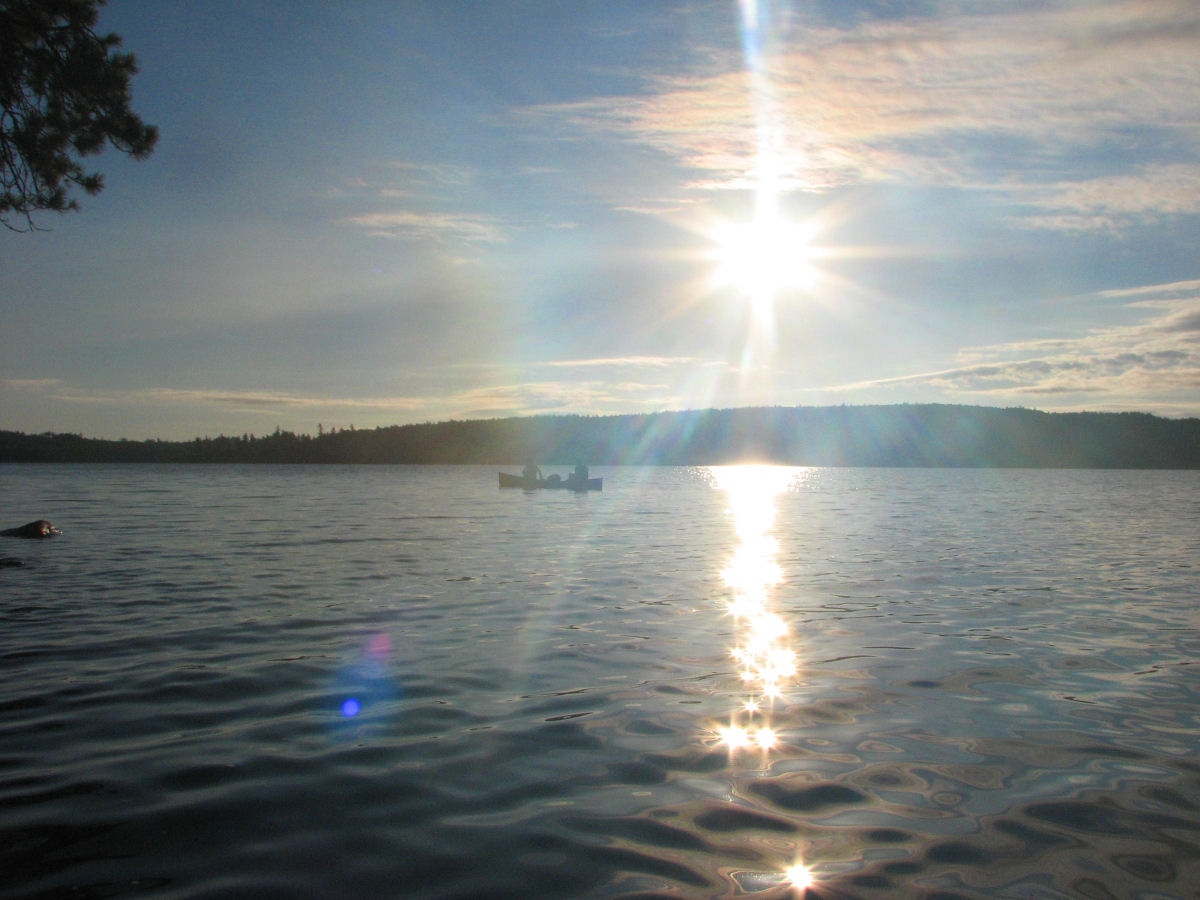

- Location within Ontario
- Location: Nipissing District and Sudbury District, Ontario
- Coordinates: 47°02′37″N 80°15′16″W
- Etymology: Ojibwe for "One lake that is almost two"
- Primary inflows: Shish Kong River & Wakimika River
- Primary outflows: Obabika River
- Basin countries: Canada
- Max. length: 20 km (12 mi)
- Max. width: 2 km (1.2 mi)
- Surface area: 32.26 km^{2} (12.46 sq mi)
- Islands: Gull & Blueberry Islands

Obabika Lake is a lake in Northeastern Ontario, Canada, located west of Lake Temagami in the Temagami region. It straddles the Sudbury-Nipissing District boundary. The Obabika River flows out of the south-western portion of the lake and eventually drains into the Sturgeon River.

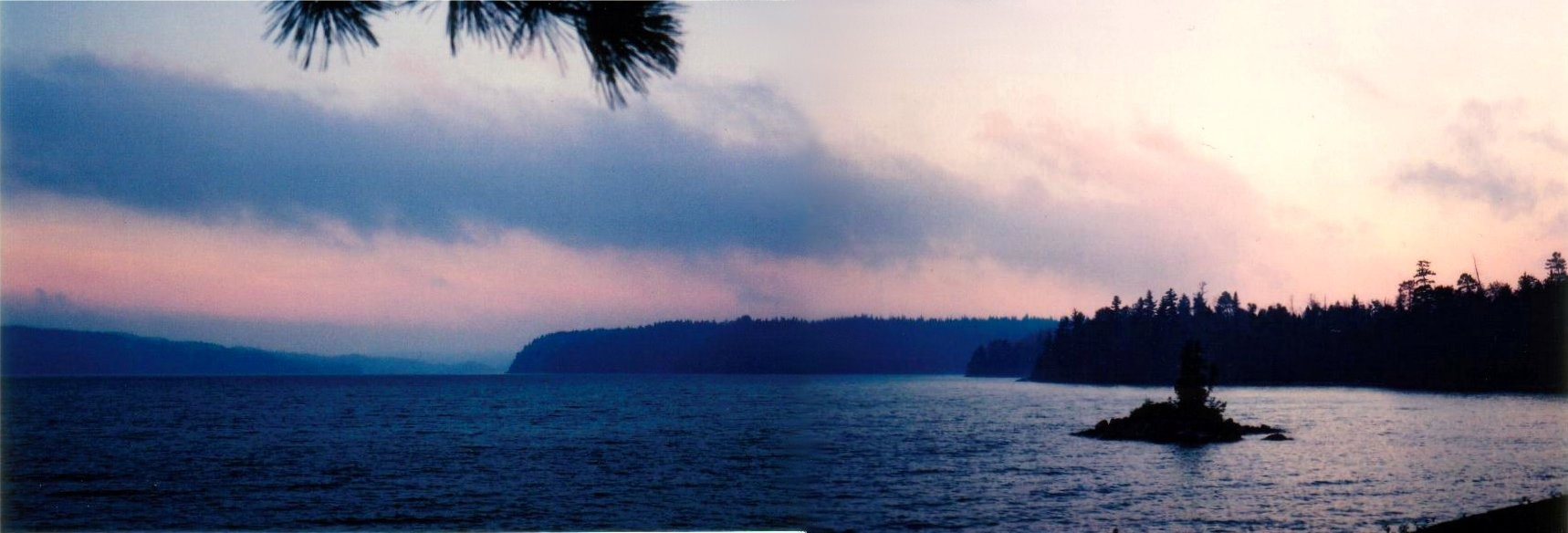
Sunset over Obabika Lake

== See also ==
- Lakes of Temagami
