= Smoothwater Lake =

Lake in Ontario, Canada

- Location within Ontario
- Location: Timiskaming District, Ontario
- Coordinates: 47°23′23.87″N 80°40′48.22″W
- Basin countries: Canada

Smoothwater Lake is a lake in Timiskaming District, Northeastern Ontario, Canada, located in Lady Evelyn-Smoothwater Provincial Park. It is the source of the Montreal River.
