= Latchford, Ontario =

Latchford
- Town (single-tier)
- Town of Latchford
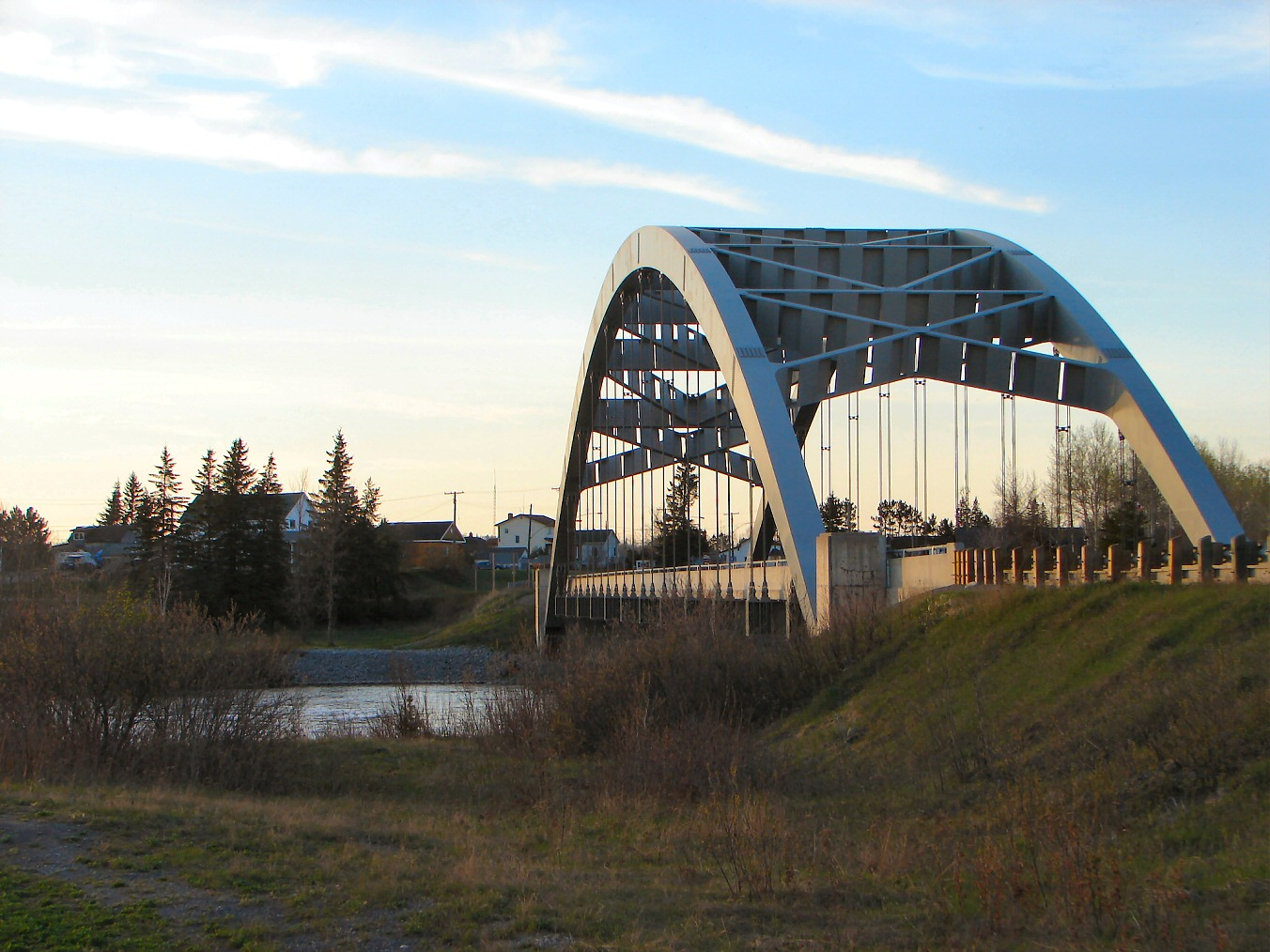
- Bridge over the Montreal River with Latchford in the background.
- Etymology: Named for Francis Robert Latchford
- Motto: The Best Little Town by a Dam Site!
- Location within Ontario
- Coordinates: 47°19′44″N 79°48′37″W
- Country: Canada
- Province: Ontario
- District: Timiskaming
- Settled: 1902
- Incorporated: June 15, 1907

Government
  - Mayor: Sharon Gadoury-East
  - Fed. riding: Nipissing—Timiskaming
  - Prov. riding: Timiskaming—Cochrane

Area
  - Land: 152.26 km^{2} (58.79 sq mi)
- Elevation: 289 m (948 ft)

Population (2021)
  - Total: 355
  - Density: 2.3/km^{2} (6.0/sq mi)
- Time zone: UTC-5 (EST)
  - Summer (DST): UTC-4 (EDT)
- Postal Code: P0J 1N0
- Area codes: 705, 249
- Website: www.latchford.ca

Latchford is a single-tier municipality town in Timiskaming District in Northeastern Ontario, Canada. It is located on Bay Lake on the Montreal River, near the town of Cobalt and the municipality of Temagami, and is 20 kilometres (12 mi) from the city of Temiskaming Shores. The population of the town in the 2021 Canadian census was 355. The town's slogan is "The Best Little Town by a Dam Site!"

== History ==
Latchford was first settled in 1902 when the decision to build the Temiskaming and Northern Ontario Railway (now the Ontario Northland Railway) was struck. It was decided the railway would cross the Montreal River at the location of what is today Latchford, and a bridge was finished in 1904. Hence, the settlement was known first as Montreal River Station. It was renamed Latchford in 1905 in honour of the provincial commissioner of public works, Francis Robert Latchford, and was incorporated as a town on July 15, 1907. A dam that provided hydroelectric power, as well as a vehicle crossing over the river, was built in 1910, and Ontario Highway 11 including a bridge over the river was built finished through the town in 1927. Silver mining, forestry, and later tourism, drove Latchford’s economy throughout the 20th century.

In 2006, the boundaries of the town were expanded to include the South Part of geographic Gillies Limit Township.

== Demographics ==
In the 2021 Census of Population conducted by Statistics Canada, Latchford had a population of 355 living in 169 of its 206 total private dwellings, a change of 13.4% from its 2016 population of 313. With a land area of 152.26 km^{2} (58.79 sq mi), it had a population density of 2.3/km^{2} (6.0/sq mi) in 2021.

Historical census populations – Latchford, Ontario

Year	Pop.	±%
1911	428	—
1921	227	−47.0%
1931	469	+106.6%
1941	587	+25.2%
1951	504	−14.1%
1956	508	+0.8%
1961	479	−5.7%

Year	Pop.	±%
1966	467	−2.5%
1971	535	+14.6%
1976	457	−14.6%
1981	397	−13.1%
1986	375	−5.5%
1991	345	−8.0%
1996	338	−2.0%

Year	Pop.	±%
2001	363	+7.4%
2006	370	+1.9%
2011	387	+4.6%
2016	313	−19.1%
2021	355	+13.4%

2006 Population figure based on revised count. Population counts are not adjusted for boundary changes.
Source: Statistics Canada

Mother tongue (2021 census):

- English as first language: 84.5%
- French as first language: 11.3%
- English and French as first languages: 1.4%
- Other as first language: 1.4%

== Attractions ==
W.J.B. Greenwood Provincial Park is in Latchford south of the town centre.

World's Shortest covered bridge.

== Transportation ==
Latchford has good road links because of Ontario Highway 11, which is part of the Trans-Canada Highway as it passes through the town. Ontario Northland offers a twice-daily bus service north towards Cochrane and south towards North Bay.

=== Bridges ===
The Sgt. Aubrey Cosens VC Memorial Bridge, which carries Ontario Highway 11, is the town's most recognized symbol. It was named after a World War II recipient of the Victoria Cross from Latchford. The bridge failed on a cold day in 2003, but was repaired and is again in service.

Latchford has a covered bridge built in 1976 which in 1983 was identified as the world's shortest, at 11 feet (3.4 m). The town's website states that the Guinness Book of World Records has certified the bridge, on Mowat Avenue just west of Highway 11, as the shortest covered bridge.

== See also ==
- List of francophone communities in Ontario
