= Sturgeon River (Lake Nipissing) =

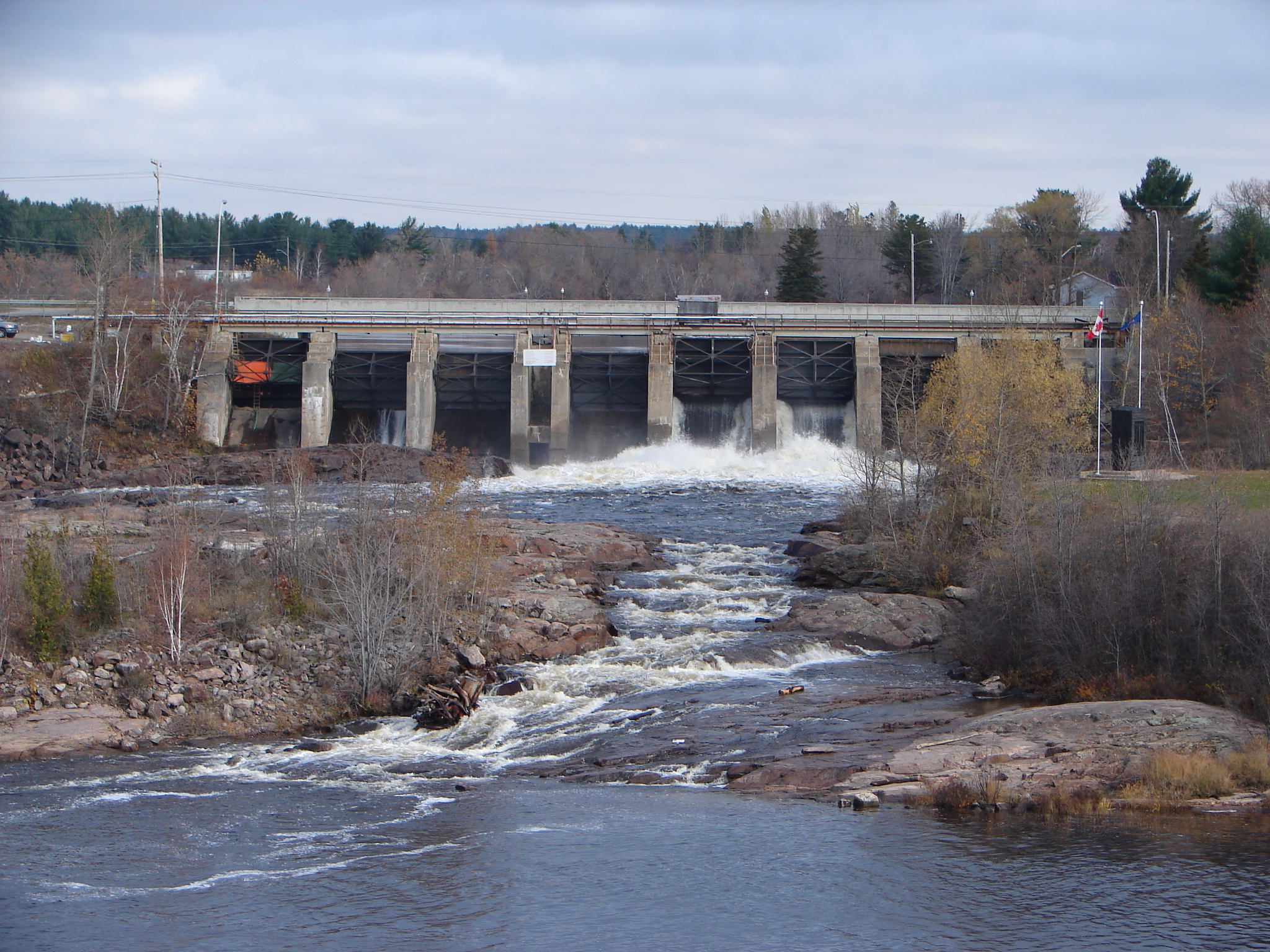
- Sturgeon Falls

- Location within Ontario

Location
- Country: Canada
- Province: Ontario
- Districts: Timiskaming, Sudbury, Nipissing

Physical characteristics
- Source: approx. 22 km (14 mi) south of Gowganda
  - location: Unorg. West Timiskaming
  - coordinates: 47°27′08″N 80°47′30″W
- Mouth: Lake Nipissing
  - location: Sturgeon Falls
  - coordinates: 46°19′02″N 79°58′04″W
  - elevation: 195 m (640 ft)
- Length: 230 km (140 mi)
- Basin size: 6,889.4 km^{2} (2,660.0 sq mi)
- Discharge
  - location: Sturgeon Falls
  - average: 89.53 m^{3}/s (3,162 cu ft/s)

The Sturgeon River is a river that springs near Lady Evelyn-Smoothwater Provincial Park in the Timiskaming District in Ontario, Canada. It flows 230 kilometres (140 mi) in a mostly south-easterly direction through Sudbury and Nipissing Districts before it empties into Lake Nipissing on the north shore. The town of Sturgeon Falls is located on the river about 3 kilometres (1.9 mi) north of its mouth.

The river is provincially significant recreational river with some 65 sets of rapids, mostly rated CI and CII that can be run all season.

Ontario Power Generation operates a hydroelectric plant on the river at Crystal Falls. From 1848 to 1879, the Hudson's Bay Company operated a fur trading post called Sturgeon River House at the mouth of this river (now turned into a local museum). Up until the middle of the 20th century, the river was used to transport logs to sawmills on Lake Nipissing. The lower part of the river is prone to flooding. In 1979 the area around the community of Field experienced a disastrous flood that prompted all residential homes to be relocated.

The upper (northerly) part of the Sturgeon River is protected in the Sturgeon River Provincial Park. This park consists of 79.85 square kilometres (30.83 sq mi) of protected wilderness stretched out along the river banks without any visitors facilities present. It is managed by Ontario Parks.

== Geography ==
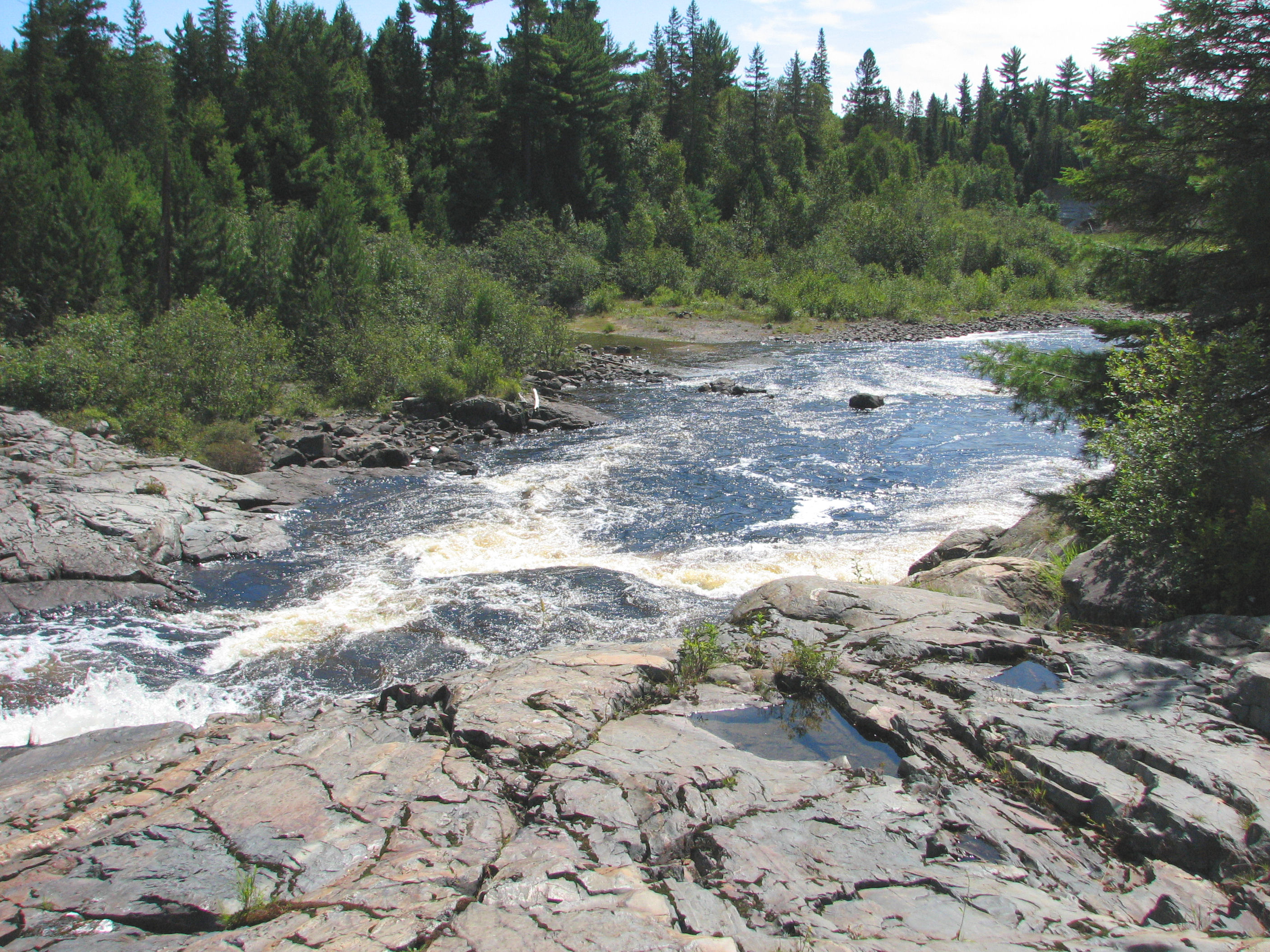
Upper Goose Falls, Sturgeon River Provincial Park

The river features a continually changing landscape, from the Temagami highlands, with bedrock outcrops and long slender lakes to narrow river channels, rapids and shallows, eventually turning to sandy shores.

=== Tributaries ===
- Smokey Creek
- Tomiko River
- Pike River
- McCarty Creek
- Hebert Creek
- Temagami River
- Azen Creek
- Wawiashkashi Lake (Grassy Lake)
- Manitou River
- Kabikotitwia River (Ess Creek)
- Obabika River
- Chiniguchi River (Murray Creek)

+ very many nameless creeks

== Hydroelectricy ==
The Sturgeon River system contains 7 dams and 2 hydroelectric power stations (Crystal Falls and West Nipissing).

Installation	Capacity	Year built	Operator	Notes
Crystal Falls Generating Station	8 MW	1921	Ontario Power Generation	originally owned by the Spanish River Co. and acquired by the Hydro-electric Power Commission in 1937
Sturgeon Falls Generating Station	6.5 MW	1902	West Nipissing Power Generation	6x Francis turbines; privately owned by MacMillan Bloedel until acquired by Municipality of West Nipissing in 2004

== See also ==
- List of rivers of Ontario
