= Lady Evelyn Lake =

Lake in Ontario, Canada

- Location within Ontario
- Location: Timiskaming District, Ontario
- Coordinates: 47°22′00″N 80°10′45″W
- Primary inflows: Lady Evelyn River
- Primary outflows: Lady Evelyn River
- Basin countries: Canada

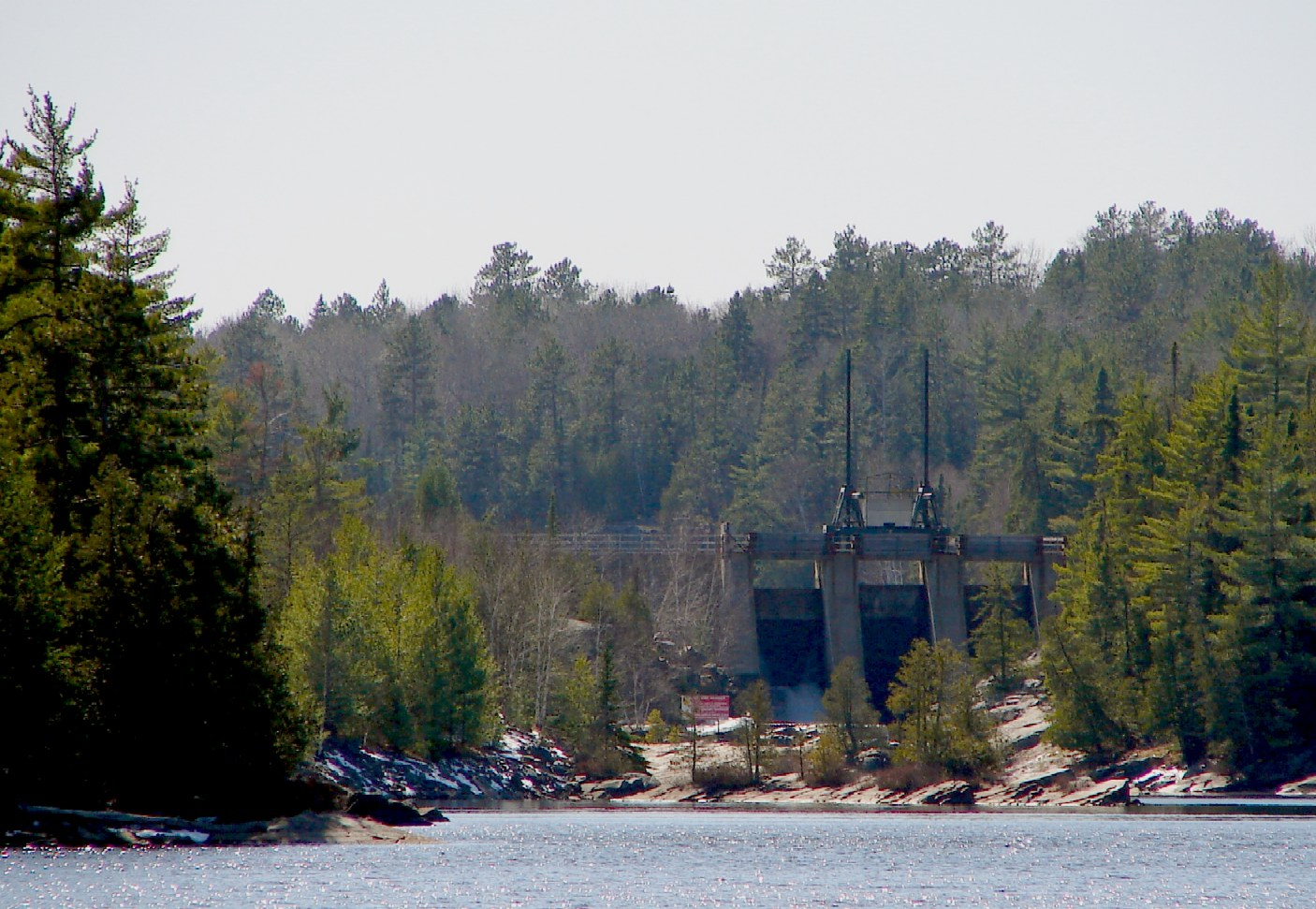
Dam at the mouth of the Lady Evelyn River, Timiskaming District, Ontario, Canada.

Lady Evelyn Lake is a lake on the Lady Evelyn River in Timiskaming District, Northeastern Ontario, Canada. The highly irregularly shaped lake consists of two parts, about equal in size, separated by the Obisaga Narrows.

The southern part is within the Obabika River Provincial Park, directly east of the Lady Evelyn-Smoothwater Provincial Park.

Its outflow, Lady Evelyn River, is a tributary of the Montreal River, which is a tributary of the Ottawa River.

== Etymology ==
Robert Bell of the Canadian Geological Survey named the lake in 1888, but it is unknown who this Lady Evelyn is. The most widely accepted theory is that it was named after the sister of Sir John Douglas Campbell, Lady Evelyn Catherine Campbell. It is likely that Bell wrote down which Lady Evelyn he intended to name it after, but many of the notes of his 1887-1888 expeditions are missing.

The original Nishnabai name for the lake is Monz-kaa-naw-ning, which means "where the moose feeds".

== See also ==
- List of lakes in Ontario
