= Lady Evelyn-Smoothwater Provincial Park =

Provincial park and wilderness area in Ontario, Canada

- IUCN category Ib (wilderness area)
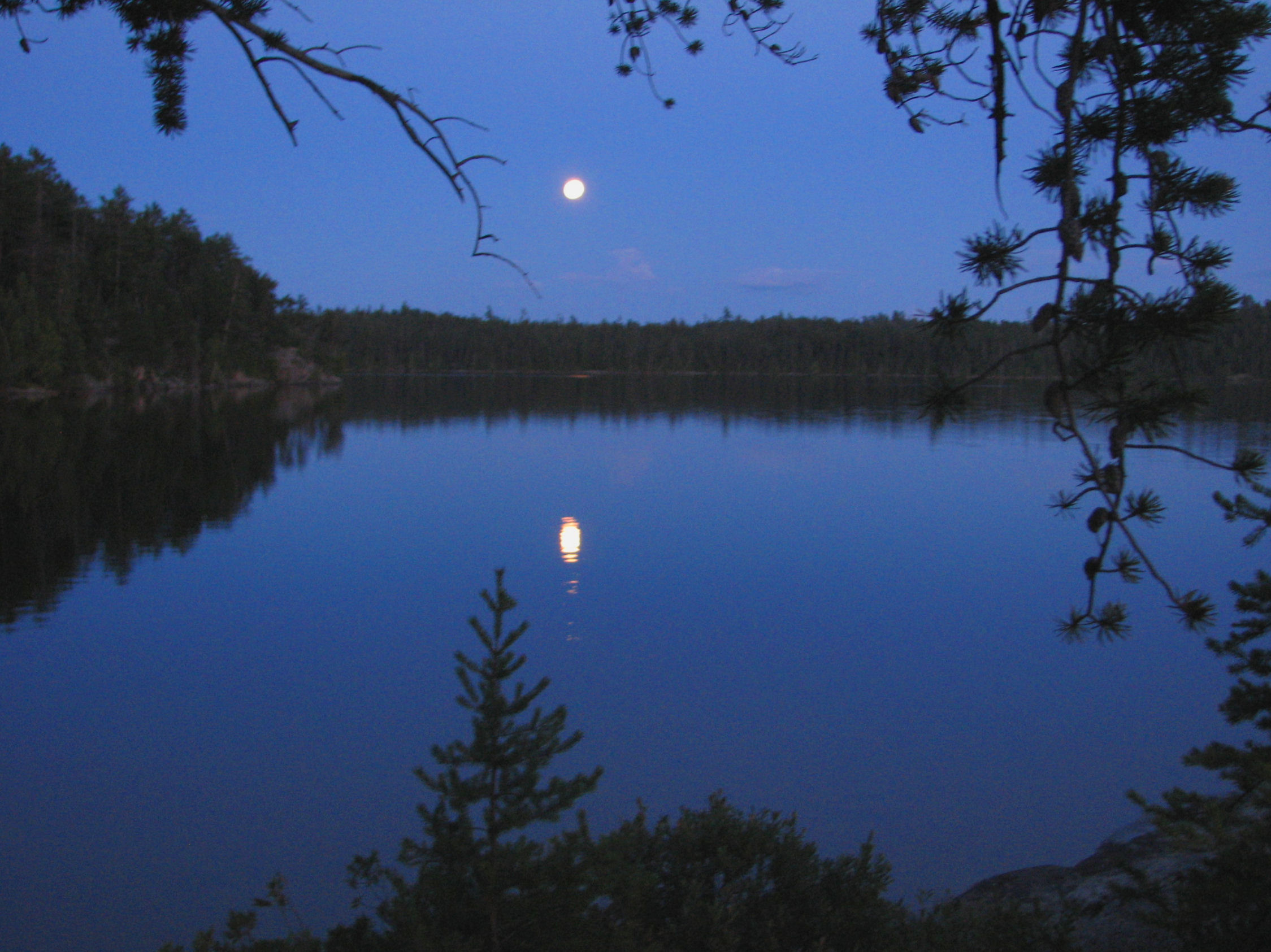
- Moon over Florence Lake

- Location within Ontario
- Interactive map of Lady Evelyn-Smoothwater Provincial Park
- Location: Timiskaming District, Ontario, Canada
- Nearest town: Temagami
- Coordinates: 47°22′40″N 80°30′42″W
- Area: 72,400 ha (280 sq mi)
- Designation: Wilderness
- Established: 1973
- Named for: Lady Evelyn River, Smoothwater Lake
- Visitors: 7,805 (in 2022)
- Governing body: Ontario Parks
- Website: www.ontarioparks.com/park/ladyevelynsmoothwater

Lady Evelyn-Smoothwater Provincial Park is a remote wilderness park in northeastern Ontario, Canada, north of Lake Temagami. This operating park, requiring permits for all visitors, encompasses "rugged topography, clear lakes, stunning waterfalls, and rushing rivers".

It is one of five provincial parks located in the Temagami area.

== Description ==
Lady Evelyn-Smoothwater Provincial Park encompasses Smoothwater Lake, Makobe Lake, the Ishpatina Ridge (highest point in Ontario), Maple Mountain (highest vertical rise in Ontario), and most of the Lady Evelyn River. The park also includes many waterfalls, such as Helen Falls, the highest waterfall on the Lady Evelyn River. Lady Evelyn Lake is just outside the park to the east.

Lady Evelyn-Smoothwater lies within the Eastern forest-boreal transition ecoregion. It offers protection to some of the last remaining stands of old growth forest in Ontario, and is home to the endangered Aurora trout.

As a wilderness park, few services are offered to visitors but it is ideal for backcountry canoeing (including whitewater canoeing), hiking, fishing, nature exploration, and wildlife viewing. Facilities include 77 backcountry campsites and 1 car-accessible campground. The park hosts fire towers on top of Ishpatina Ridge and Maple Mountain, accessible by hiking trails. The canoe routes through the park are part of Temagami's 2,400 kilometres (1,500 mi) long network of portages and waterways. Many of these portages are traditional indigenous routes called "nastawgan", which link this park with adjacent parks, conservation reserves, and Crown land.

The park is at the heart of a network of provincial parks and conservation reserves in the Temagami area. It borders on the Makobe-Grays River Provincial Park to the north, Sturgeon River Provincial Park to the southwest, Solace Provincial Park to the south, and Obabika River Provincial Park to the south and east. Furthermore, Smith Lake (to the west), North Yorston (to the south), and Jim Edwards Lake (to the south) Conservation Reserves are adjacent to Lady Evelyn-Smoothwater, while another 5 conservation reserves are within a few kilometres from the park.

== History ==
Lady Evelyn River was established as a park in 1973. In 1983, the park was expanded to its present area of 72,000 hectares.

The region has been home to the Teme-Augama Anishnabai for thousands of years; within the park, Maple Mountain (Chee-bay-jing) is traditional sacred site.

Throughout the park are remnants of logging activities from the early and mid-1900s.

== See also ==
- List of Ontario parks
