= Temagami (disambiguation) =

Temagami, formerly spelled as Timagami, is a municipality in Northeastern Ontario, Canada, in the District of Nipissing with Lake Temagami at its heart.

Temagami may also refer to:

== Places ==
- Temagami North, an unincorporated community in the above municipality
- Temagami railway station, located in the above municipality
- Temagami River, located in the Nipissing District of the province of Ontario.
- Lake Temagami, source of the above river
- Temagami Island, located in the above lake
- Temagami Water Aerodrome
- Temagami/Mine Landing Water Aerodrome

== Geology ==
- Temagami Greenstone Belt
- Temagami Magnetic Anomaly
- Copperfields Mine, originally known as Temagami Mine, located on Temagami Island
- Temagamite, discovered in the above mine

== People ==
- Temagami First Nation

== See also ==
- Timiskaming (disambiguation), word from the same Algonquin root
