= Phyllis Township =

- Location of Phyllis Township in Ontario
- Coordinates: 46°56′35″N 80°07′46″W
- Country: Canada
- Province: Ontario
- Region: Northeastern Ontario
- District: Nipissing
- Municipality: Temagami
- Time zone: UTC-5 (Eastern Time Zone)
  - Summer (DST): UTC-4 (Eastern Time Zone)
- Area codes: 705, 249

Phyllis Township is a geographic township in Nipissing District of Northeastern Ontario, Canada.

The township is bordered on the north by Joan Township, on the east by Yates Township, on the south by Vogt Township and on the west by Scholes Township.

Phyllis Township is home to the northern end of the McLean Peninsula and several islands in Lake Temagami. Temagami Island, the largest island in Lake Temagami, largely resides in Phyllis Township and is the location of Copperfields Mine.
