= Palladium disulfide =

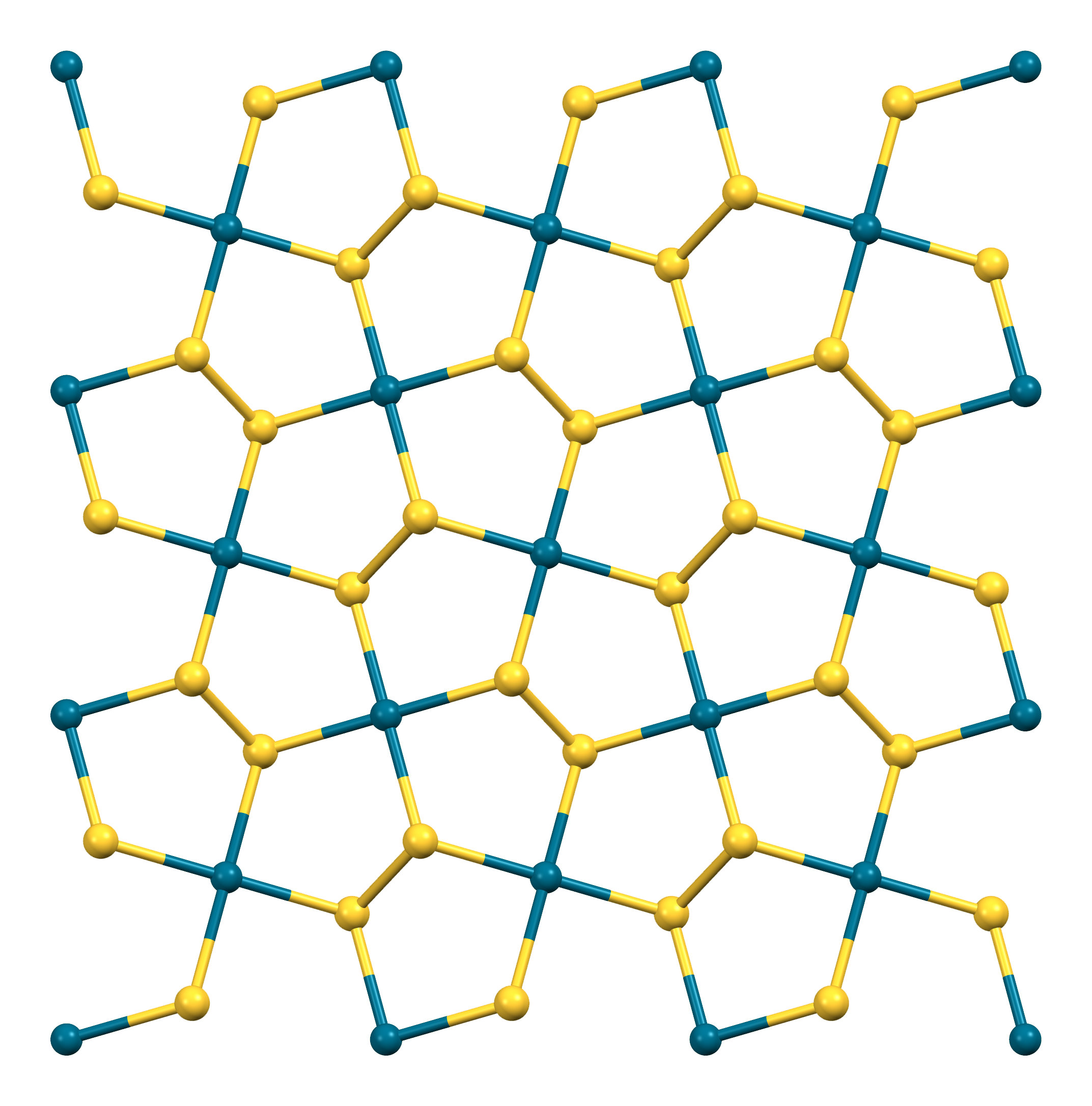

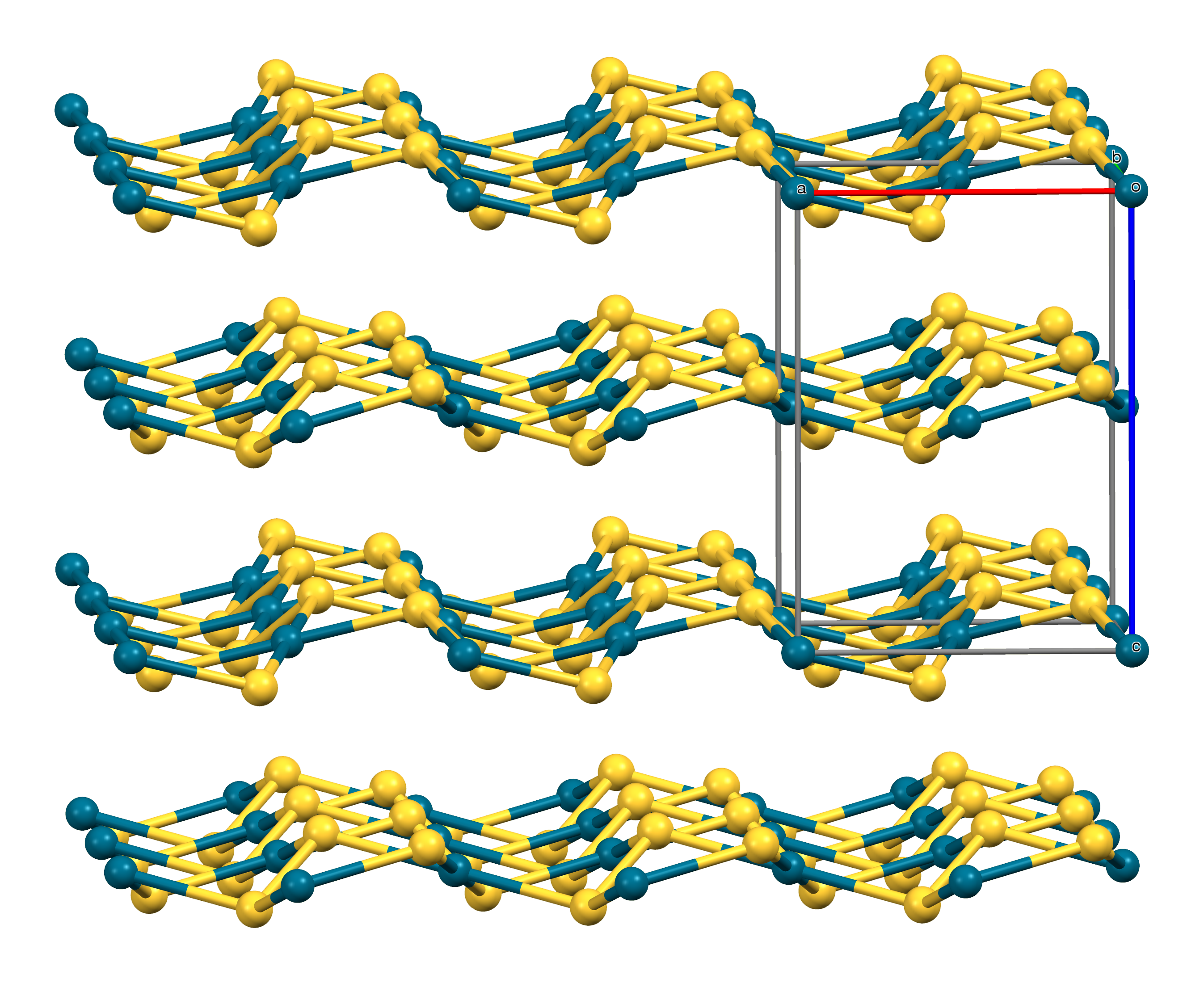

Names
- Other names Palladium(II) disulfide

Identifiers
CAS Number	12137-75-6
3D model (JSmol)	Interactive image
PubChem CID	163192485
- InChI: InChI=1S/Pd.S2/c;1-2/q+2;-2 Key: ZMOVFMLVWHDWBO-UHFFFAOYSA-N
- SMILES: [S-][S-].[Pd+2]

Properties
Chemical formula	PdS_{2}
Appearance	grey solid or black crystalline powder metallic crystals

Related compounds
Other anions	Palladium diselenide; Palladium ditelluride
Other cations	Platinum disulfide; Ruthenium disulfide; Iridium disulfide
Related compounds	Palladium(II) sulfide; Platinum diselenide
- Except where otherwise noted, data are given for materials in their standard state (at 25 °C [77 °F], 100 kPa). Infobox references

Palladium disulfide is a chemical compound of palladium and sulfur with the chemical formula PdS_{2}.

== Structure ==
PdS_{2} contains sulfur-sulfur bonds so it can be thought of as a disulfide that formally consists of S_{2}^{2−} and Pd^{2+} ions, instead of S^{2−} and Pd^{4+} ions. It adopts a layered crystal structure that contains square planar palladium centres and trigonal pyramidal sulfur centres.

== Preparation ==
Palladium disulfide is formed when palladium(II) sulfide is heated with an excess of sulfur.

PdS + S → PdS_{2}

However, some starting material may remain even after heating for many months. An alternative route involves heating palladium(II) chloride and excess sulfur to 450 °C in a sealed tube, then washing the crude product with carbon disulfide. This procedure yields PdS_{2} free of PdS.

== Related compounds ==
A variety of other compounds in the Pd-S system have been reported, including Pd_{4}S, Pd_{2.8}S, Pd_{2.2}S and PdS.

== See also ==
- Pyrite
- Marcasite
