= Palladium(II) sulfide =

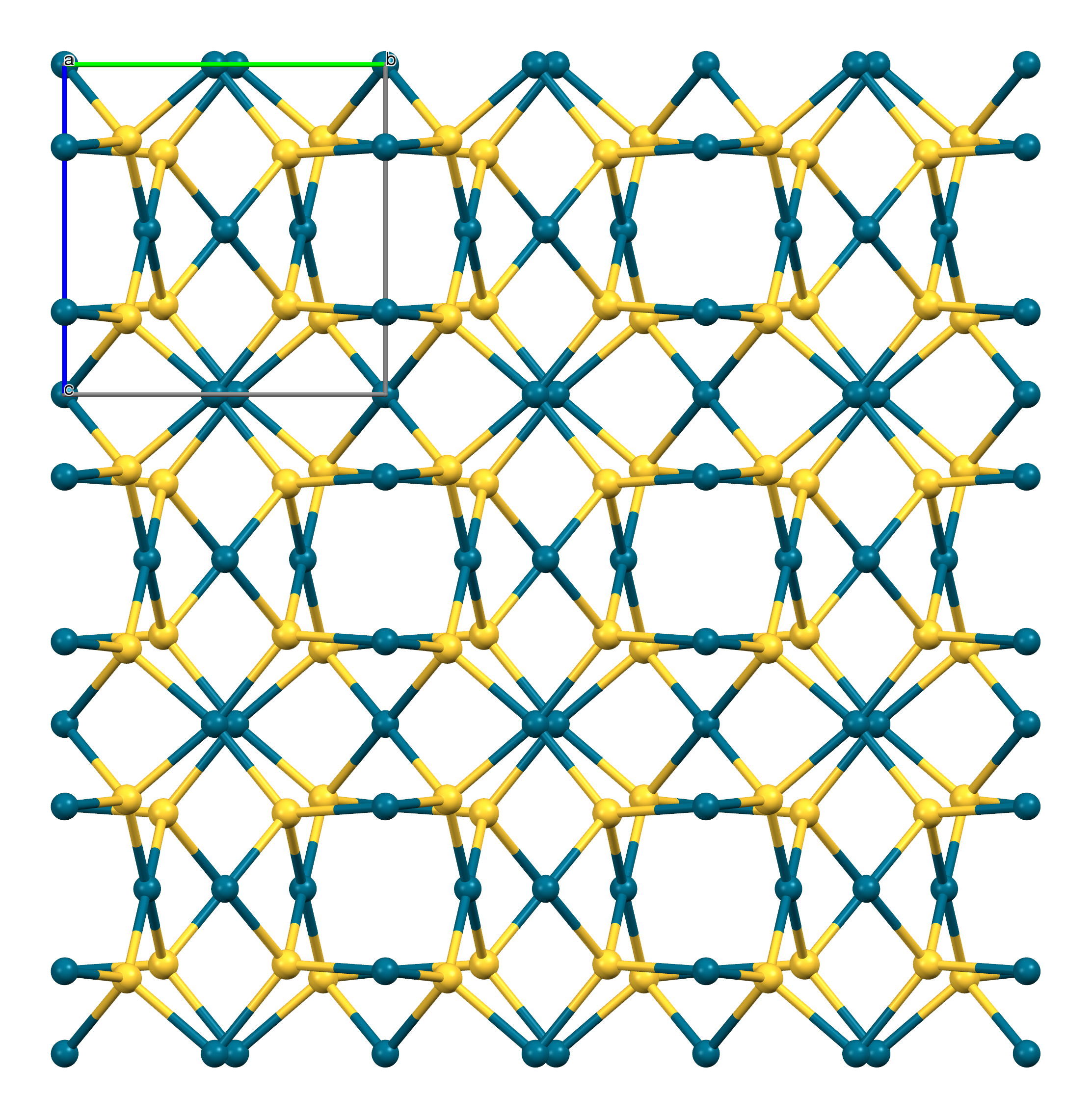
- Ball-and-stick model of the crystal structure

Names
- Other names Palladium monosulfide

Identifiers
CAS Number	12648-43-0; 12125-22-3
3D model (JSmol)	Interactive image
ChemSpider	9484517
ECHA InfoCard	100.031.979
EC Number	235-190-6
PubChem CID	82926
CompTox Dashboard (EPA)	DTXSID00893217
- InChI: InChI=1S/Pd.S Key: NRUVOKMCGYWODZ-UHFFFAOYSA-N
- SMILES: [S]=[Pd]

Properties
Chemical formula	PdS
Appearance	brown solid or black or grey metallic crystals

Related compounds
Other anions	Palladium(II) oxide
Other cations	Nickel(II) sulfide; Platinum(II) sulfide
Related compounds	Palladium disulfide; Platinum diselenide
- Except where otherwise noted, data are given for materials in their standard state (at 25 °C [77 °F], 100 kPa). Infobox references

Palladium(II) sulfide is a chemical compound of palladium and sulfur with the chemical formula PdS. Like other palladium and platinum chalcogenides, palladium(II) sulfide has complex structural, electrical and magnetic properties.

== Structure ==
The crystal structure of PdS contains approximately square planar palladium centres and tetrahedral sulfur centres.

== Preparation ==
Palladium(II) sulfide is formed when hydrogen sulfide is passed through an aqueous solution containing palladium in the +2 oxidation state:

Pd^{2+} + H_{2}S → PdS + 2H^{+}

Berzelius reacted palladium directly with sulfur to produce palladium(II) sulfide in 1813:

Pd + S → PdS

== Reactions ==
If palladium(II) sulfide is heated with an excess of sulfur, palladium disulfide is formed:

PdS + S → PdS_{2}

== Related compounds ==
A variety of other compounds in the Pd-S system have been reported, including Pd_{4}S, Pd_{2.8}S, Pd_{2.2}S and PdS_{2}. The mineral Braggite has the composition (Pt, Pd, Ni)S and is isomorphous with PdS.

== See also ==
- Cooperite
- Verbeekite
- Merenskyite
