= Palladium(II) sulfate =

Names
- Other names: Palladous sulfate

Identifiers
CAS Number	13566-03-5
3D model (JSmol)	Interactive image
ChemSpider	145977
ECHA InfoCard	100.033.583
EC Number	236-957-8
PubChem CID	166846
CompTox Dashboard (EPA)	DTXSID30884517
- InChI: InChI=1S/H2O4S.Pd/c1-5(2,3)4;/h(H2,1,2,3,4);/q;+2/p-2 Key: RFLFDJSIZCCYIP-UHFFFAOYSA-L
- SMILES: [Pd+2].S(=O)(=O)([O-])[O-]

Properties
Chemical formula	PdSO_{4}
Molar mass	202.48 g/mol
Appearance	Red-brown solid (anhydrous)
Density	4.2 g/cm^{3}
Melting point	525 °C (977 °F; 798 K) (decomposition)
Solubility in water	Hydrolysis
Solubility	Soluble in conc. sulfuric acid

Structure
Crystal structure	Monoclinic
Space group	C2/c
Lattice constant	a = 7.84 Å, b = 5.18 Å, c = 7.91 Å α = 90°, β = 95.6°, γ = 90°

Thermochemistry
Std molar entropy (S^{⦵}_{298})	97.5 J/(mol·K)
Std enthalpy of formation (Δ_{f}H^{⦵}_{298})	−672.4 kJ/mol

Hazards
- GHS labelling
Pictograms	(GHS05: Corrosive) (GHS07: Exclamation mark)
Signal word	Danger
Hazard statements	H302, H314
Precautionary statements	P260, P264, P270, P280, P301+P317, P301+P330+P331, P302+P361+P354, P304+P340, P305+P354+P338, P316, P321, P330, P363, P405, P501

Related compounds
Other cations	Nickel(II) sulfate
- Except where otherwise noted, data are given for materials in their standard state (at 25 °C [77 °F], 100 kPa). Infobox references

Palladium(II) sulfate is an inorganic chemical compound with the formula PdSO_{4}. It is a hygroscopic red-brown solid that forms the dihydrate, PdSO_{4}·2H_{2}O.

== Preparation and properties ==
Palladium(II) sulfate is produced by the reaction of palladium metal with a mixture of nitric acid and sulfuric acid. It can also be produced by the reaction of palladium(II) sulfide and oxygen in dimethylformamide.

When anhydrous palladium(II) sulfate absorbs moisture from the air, it forms a greenish-brown dihydrate. The anhydrous form can be regenerated by the heating of the dihydrate at 202 °C.

Anhydrous palladium(II) sulfate decomposes to palladium(II) oxide at 525 °C releasing sulfur trioxide:

PdSO_{4} → PdO + SO_{3}
