= Platinum sulfide =

Platinum sulfide may refer to:

- Platinum(II) sulfide, PtS
- Platinum disulfide, PtS_{2}
