= Joan Township, Ontario =

Joan Township
- Geographic township
- Location of Joan Township in Ontario
- Coordinates: 47°01′29″N 80°04′19″W
- Country: Canada
- Province: Ontario
- Region: Northeastern Ontario
- District: Nipissing
- Municipality: Temagami
- Elevation: 292 m (958 ft)
- Time zone: UTC-5 (Eastern Time Zone)
  - Summer (DST): UTC-4 (Eastern Time Zone)
- Area codes: 705, 249

Joan Township is a geographic township in Temagami, Nipissing District, Northeastern Ontario, Canada, situated in the core of Lake Temagami. It covers much of Bear Island, the northern tip of Temagami Island, the Northwest Arm of Lake Temagami, Sand Point, and the Joan Peninsula.
