= Mount Kanasuta =

Hilled area of Quebec

- Mont Kanasuta (French)
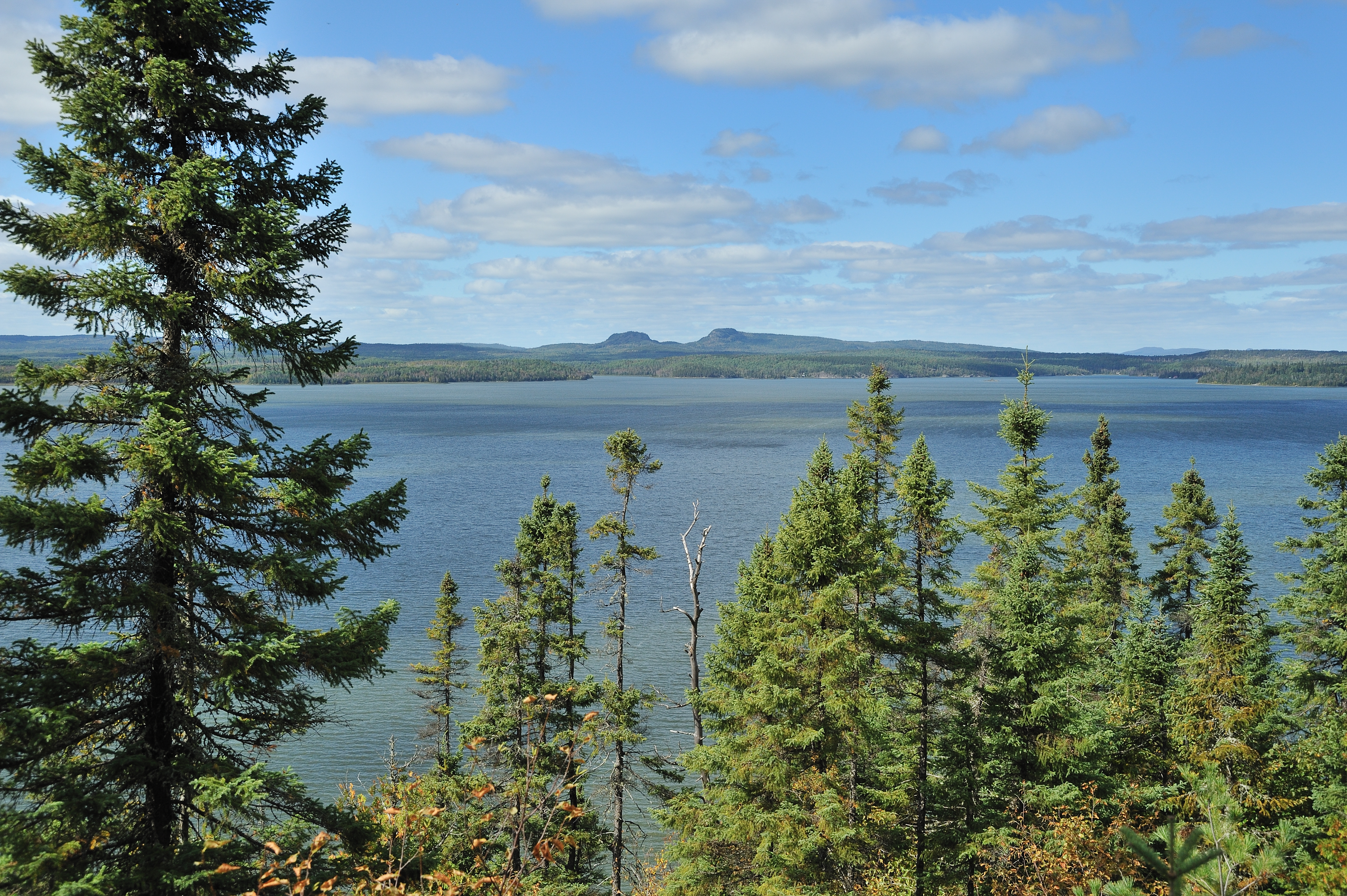
- Lake Opasatica, with Mount Kanasuta in the background, 2012

Highest point
- Elevation: 502 m (1,647 ft)
- Parent peak: K1
- Coordinates: 48°11′12″N 79°23′56″W

Naming
- Native name: Kanasuta (North American Indian languages)
- English translation: where the devils go dancing

Geography
- Location: Abitibi-Témiscamingue, Quebec, Canada.

Mount Kanasuta, often known as Mont Kanasuta, is a hilled area near the Quebec–Ontario border in the Abitibi-Témiscamingue administrative region of Quebec, Canada.

== Nomenclature ==
Kanasuta is an Ojibwe word that means "where the devils go dancing." Mount Kanasuta is often known by its French language name Mont Kanasuta.

== Description and location ==
Mount Kanasuta is a geographical hilly area near the Quebec–Ontario border within the Abitibi-Témiscamingue administrative region of Quebec. The hills are located between the St. Lawrence River and Hudson Bay.

The area incorporates two hills, known as K1 and K2, the later informally known as Lion Mountain, due to its shape.

== History ==
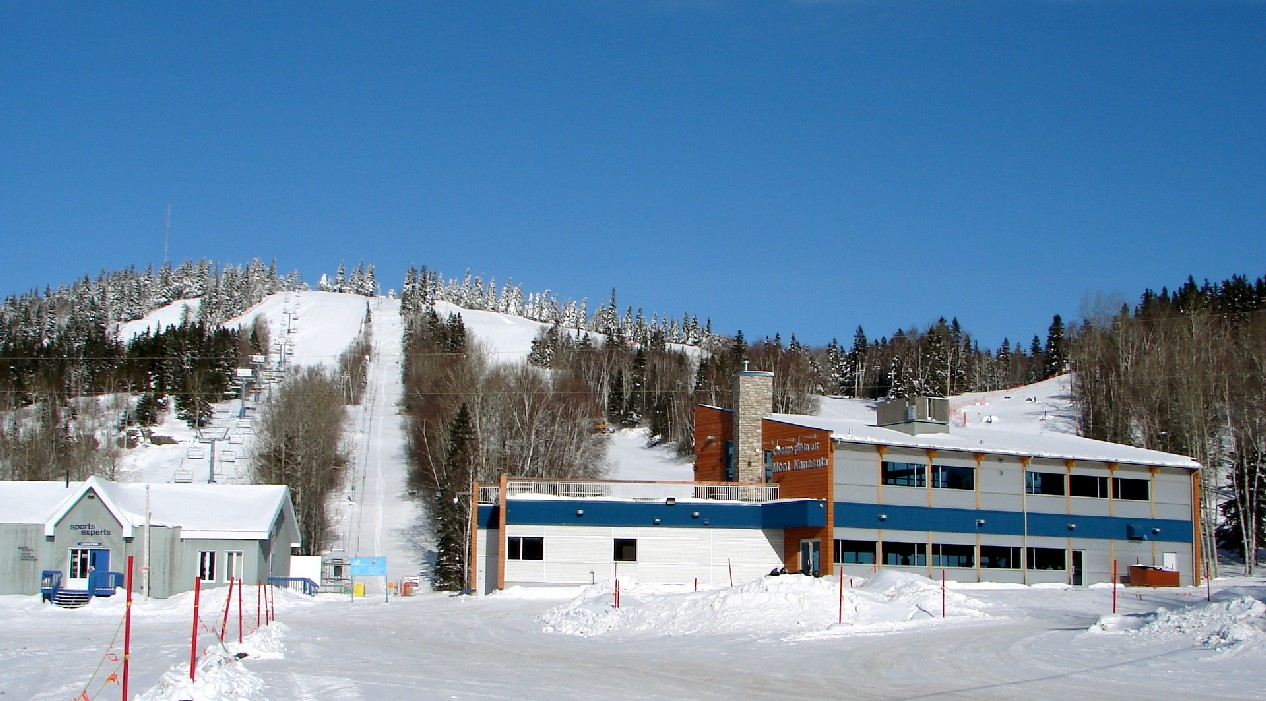
The ski resort on K1

In 1686, the area was a portage route, used by French military commander Pierre de Troyes. Former Temagami First Nation chief Ignace Tonené was buried near Mount Kanasuta after his death in 1916.

In contemporary times, it is known for its ski resort, located on K1.

== In popular culture ==
Kanasuta is also the name of a musical album by Richard Desjardins, a Canadian musician who advocated for greater environmental protection of the area.
