= Devil Island (Lake Temagami) =

Island in Nipissing District, Ontario, Canada

- Interactive map of Devil Island

Geography
- Location: Lake Temagami
- Coordinates: 47°05′N 80°05.5′W
- Area: 0.242 km^{2} (0.093 sq mi)

Administration
- Canada
- Province: Ontario

Additional information
- Private

Devil Island, sometimes mistakenly called Devil's Island, is an island located on the north arm of Lake Temagami, in Ontario, Canada.

== Camp ==
Keewaydin Canoe Camp, founded in 1902, is based on Devil Island, in the shadow of Devil Mountain and across from Granny Bay in the northern section of the lake. It is one of several camps on Lake Temagami whose focus is on wilderness canoe trips using traditional equipment such as cedar and canvas canoes, wannigans, and tumplines. It is 60 acres (240,000 m^{2}), which includes the Keewaydin camp and a resort called Ojibway.

== See also ==
- List of islands of Lake Temagami
