= Mount Ferguson =

Mount Ferguson may refer to:

- Mount Ferguson (Antarctica)
- Mount Ferguson (Ontario)
