= Red squirrel (disambiguation) =

Red squirrel may refer to:

- The red squirrel or Eurasian red squirrel (Sciurus vulgaris);
- The American red squirrel (Tamiasciurus hudsonicus);
- The northern Amazon red squirrel (Sciurus igniventris);
- The southern Amazon red squirrel (Sciurus spadiceus);
- The Red Squirrel, a Spanish film, first released in 1993;
- Red Squirrel Road, a logging road located within the Municipality of Temagami, in the Nipissing District, Ontario, Canada;
- Red Squirrel Lake, a lake located within the municipality of Temagami, Ontario, Canada;
- Red Squirrel River, an alternate name for the Anima Nipissing River, in the Nipissing District, Canada.
