= Temagamite =

Telluride mineral

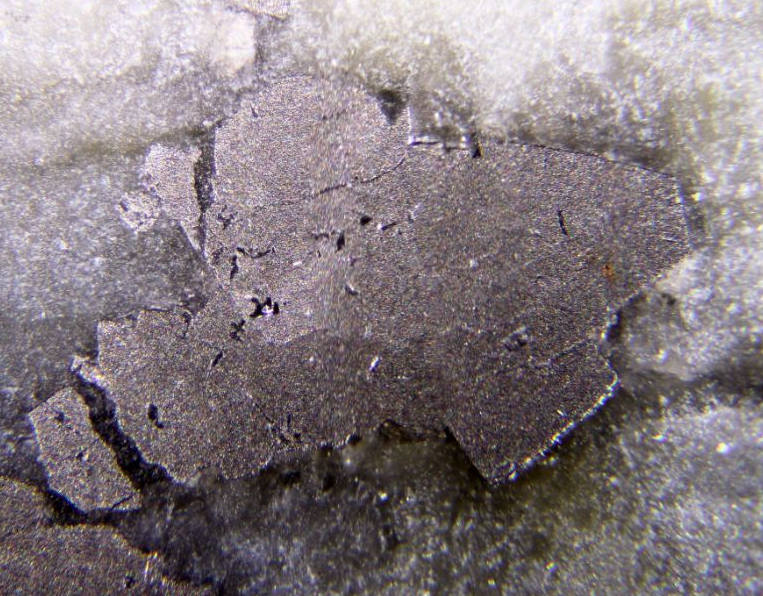

General
- Category: Telluride mineral
- Formula: Pd_{3}HgTe_{3}
- IMA symbol: Tem
- Strunz classification: 2.BC.50
- Crystal system: Orthorhombic; Unknown space group

Identification
- Color: Bright white to grey
- Crystal habit: microscopic included grains
- Mohs scale hardness: 2.5
- Luster: Metallic
- Diaphaneity: Opaque
- Specific gravity: 9.5
- Pleochroism: Weak

Temagamite is a bright white palladium mercury telluride mineral with a hardness of 2 1/2 on the Mohs scale. Its chemical formula is Pd_{3}HgTe_{3}. It was discovered at the Temagami Mine on Temagami Island, Lake Temagami in 1973, and it represents a rare mineral in the Temagami Greenstone Belt.

It occurs as microscopic inclusions within massive chalcopyrite at Temagami in association with other rare tellurides: merenskyite, stützite, hessite and an unnamed Pd-Hg-Ag telluride. In addition to the discovery locality, it has been reported from the Stillwater igneous complex in Montana and the New Rambler copper–nickel mine in the Medicine Bow Mountains of Wyoming.

== See also ==
- List of minerals
