= Ignace Tonené =

Algonquin chief (1840/41–1916)

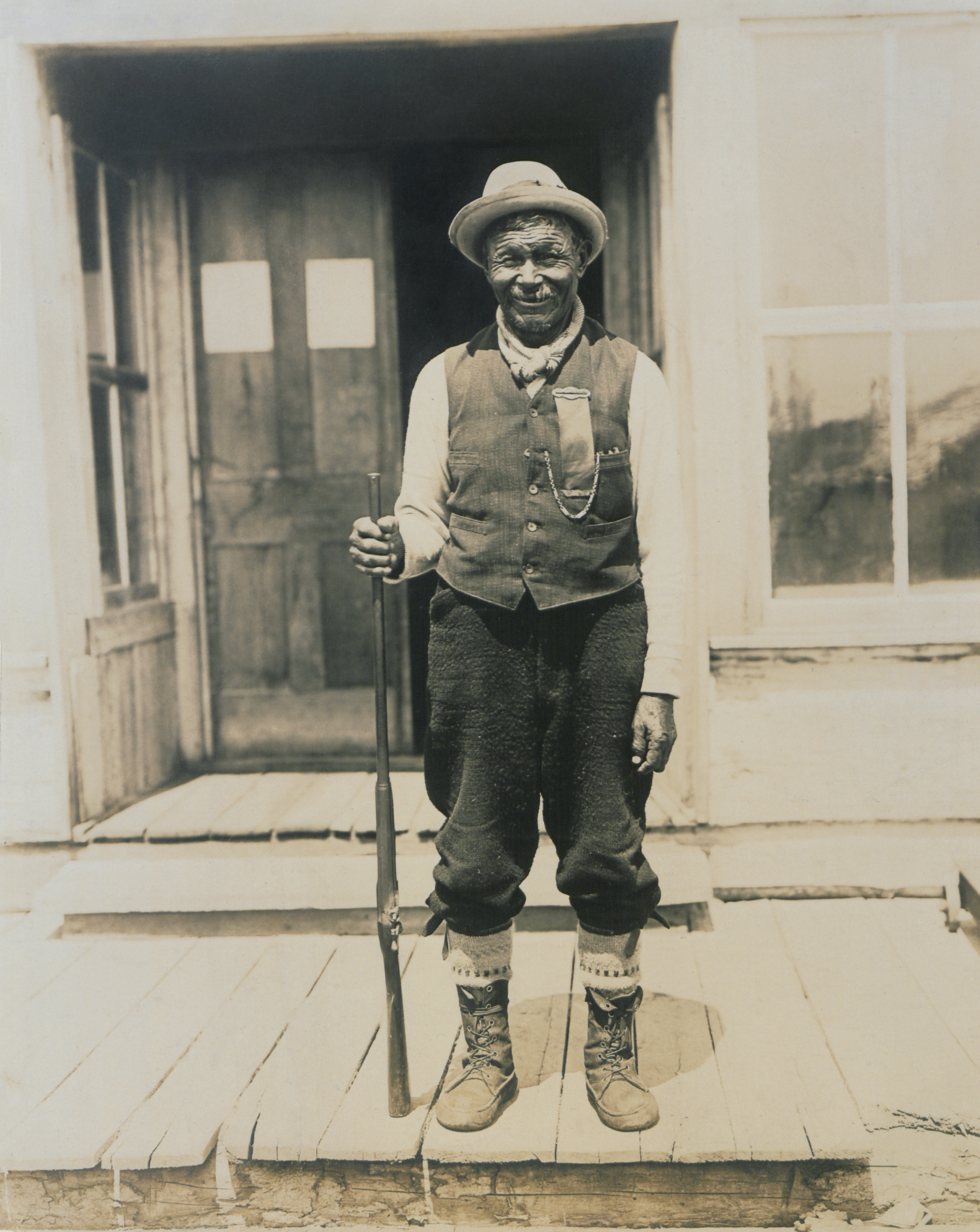
- Tonené in 1909 holding a rifle
- Born: 1840 or 1841 near Lake Temagami, Upper Canada
- Died: 15 March 1916 (aged 74–75) near Lake Abitibi, Quebec
- Burial place: near Mount Kanasuta, Quebec
- Other names: Nias; Maiagizis
- Occupations: First Nations chief; fur trader; gold prospector
- Employer: Hudson's Bay Company
- Known for: Teme-Augama Anishnabai leadership
- Title: Chief
- Spouses: Angèle (m. 1860; died 1869); Elisabeth Pikossekat (m. 1871)
- Children: 7
- Family: White Bear (Wabimakwa) (grandfather) Nebenegwune (father-in-law)

Ignace Tonené (1840 or 1841 – 15 March 1916), also known as Nias or, by his Ojibwe name Maiagizis ('right / correct sun'), was a Teme-Augama Anishnabai chief, fur trader, and gold prospector in Upper Canada. Maiagizis was most commonly known by his French name, Ignace Tonené, that often was shortened to Nias. He was a prominent employee of the Hudson's Bay Company.

Tonené was the elected deputy chief of his community before being the lead chief and later, the life chief. In his role as deputy, he negotiated with the Canadian federal government and the Ontario provincial government, advocating for his community to receive annual financial support from both. He negotiated in both English and French, as well as native languages. His attempts to secure land reserves for his community were thwarted by the Ontario premier, Oliver Mowat.

In 1906, his successful prospecting triggered a gold rush. One of his claims was stolen from Tonené by white Canadian prospectors. Later, the site of the gold deposit he discovered became the Kerr Addison Mines Ltd. Tonené died in 1916 at the age of 74 or 75. He is buried near Mount Kanasuta in Quebec.

== Early life ==
He was born in 1840 or 1841 near Lake Temagami in the Temagami First Nation in Upper Canada. He was the eldest son of Marian and François Kabimigwune. He was the grandson of Temagami chief White Bear (Wabimakwa). His brother was Frank White Bear (d. 1930).

== Career and community leadership ==
As a teenager in 1857, Tonené began working for the Hudson's Bay Company as a courier, delivering mail between its trading posts at Lake Timiskaming and Lake Temagami. He also worked at Fort Témiscamingue, the likely place where he learned French.

=== Leadership ===
Around 1889, Tonené was elected as deputy chief (anike ogima) of the Teme-Augama Anishnabai, succeeding his father. In 1877, Tonené filed a land claim concerning the Temagami region with the Parry Sound federal Indian Agent. In 1878, Tonené became the head chief. He oversaw the adoption of potato farming and cattle raising. As chief, Tonené was noted for his principles, advocating that debts must be paid, including to the Hudson's Bay Company. Unlike other First Nations surrounding Lake Huron, Tonené's community was not a party to the Robinson Treaties. The treaties were two 1850 formal agreements between Ojibwa chiefs and the British Crown in which chiefs relinquished land in exchange for immediate and ongoing financial payments. In his separate negotiations, Tonené advocated for redress and support for his people. Tonené was concerned about the effects of lumberjacks and their activities on the natural resources of the area. He advocated to federal Indian agent Charles Skene for the provision of an annuity payment and the creation of a reserve for his people.

During a speech in January 1889, Tonené warned his community: "The white men were coming closer and closer every year and the deer and furs were becoming scarcer and scarcer ... so that in a few years more Indians could not live by hunting alone." He continued to press the government for federal financial support and the creation of a reserve through a series of meetings and letters written in Anishinaabe that resulted in an acknowledgment from Indian agent Deputy Superintendent Lawrence Vankoughnet in 1880, that indeed, approximately 2,800 square miles (7,300 km^{2}) of Temagami land were unceded. Initially, Canadian Prime Minister John A. Macdonald deferred the matter to the Ontario Premier, but in 1883 the Department of Indian Affairs agreed to an annual payment to the Indigenous nation. The payments were comparable to the amounts received by other First Nations who were parties to the Robinson Huron Treaty. In 1884, Tonené convened a tribal council on Bear Island to discuss the potential location for the reserve established by the treaties; the community agreed it should be about 100 square miles (260 km^{2}) surrounding Cross Lake and at the south end of Lake Temagami. The federal government agreed to the proposal, but the Ontario Premier Oliver Mowat, who had a reputation for hostility toward Indigenous treaty rights, blocked the land transfer, primarily concerned about the value of the red and white pine lumber at the location. It was not until 1943 that lands finally were set aside for the Temagami and the official creation of the Bear Island Reserve did not occur until 1971.

In 1889, after Oliver Mowat's refusal to create the reserve, and as his chiefdom ended, Tonené moved his family to land between Lake Opasatica and Lake Dasserat near Abitibi, Quebec. In 1889, he travelled to Bear Island to meet Indian agent Thomas Walton and to negotiate for seeds and farming equipment for his community. Tonené hunted and trapped to feed his family and, motivated by the recent silver discovery at Cobalt, Ontario, in 1903, he started prospecting. His successful finds of gold set off the Larder Lake gold rush of 1906, according to the Canadian Mining Journal. The gold deposits at McGarry that he discovered and where he staked at least one claim that subsequently was stolen from him by white settlers, later became the Kerr-Addison mine. The Tonené Old Indian Mining Company issued a prospectus just prior to the start of World War I, but sources do not indicate whether Tonené benefited from the company.

Tonené was succeeded as head chief by John Paul. Tonené continued to hunt and trap in Abitibi country. Following the 1893 death of John Paul, Tonené once again became head chief. In 1910, he became the honorary chief, or life chief of the community and as such, became the primary advisor to the new head chief, his younger brother Frank White Bear.

== Personal life ==
In 1860, Tonené married Angèle, the daughter of former Temagami band chief Nebenegwune. They had two sons and two daughters. Angèle died in childbirth in 1869. In 1871, Tonené married Elisabeth Pikossekat of the Timiskaming band and they had three daughters. Both of Tonené's sons died before adulthood. His five daughters all lived into adulthood, married, and had children.

== Death and legacy ==
Tonené died on 15 March 1916, near Lake Abitibi, Quebec. He was buried close to Mount Kanasuta, Quebec, near the Quebec–Ontario border. Later, the location of his burial was turned into a gravel pit and then, into a community dump. To honor Tonené, in 2016 Tournene Lake (lac Tournene) was renamed Chief Tonene Lake by the Canadian government. The lake is south of Bear Lake and north of Larder Lake.
