= Palladium sulfide =

Palladium sulfide may refer to:

- Palladium(II) sulfide (PdS)
- Palladium disulfide (PdS_{2})
- Other binary compounds of palladium and sulfur, including Pd_{4}S, Pd_{2.8}S, Pd_{2.2}S
