= Platinum diselenide =

Names
- Other names Platinum(IV) selenide Sudovikovite

Identifiers
CAS Number	12038-26-5
3D model (JSmol)	Interactive image
ChemSpider	103869865
PubChem CID	101946448
CompTox Dashboard (EPA)	DTXSID201312652
- InChI: InChI=1S/Pt.2Se Key: JTPDXCIVXNLRFP-UHFFFAOYSA-N
- SMILES: [Se]=[Pt]=[Se]

Properties
Chemical formula	PtSe_{2}
Molar mass	353.026 g·mol^{−1}
Appearance	opaque metallic yellowish white
Density	9.54
Melting point	decomposes
Solubility in water	insoluble
Band gap	0 (bulk) 1.3 eV monolayer

Structure
Crystal structure	space group P3̅m1 164 hexagonal
Lattice constant	a = 3.728, c = 5.031
Coordination geometry	octahedral

Related compounds
Other anions	Platinum disulfide; Platinum ditelluride; PtSeTe; PtSSe
Other cations	palladium diselenide; NiSeTe
Related platinum selenides	Luberoite (Pt_{5}Se_{4})
- Except where otherwise noted, data are given for materials in their standard state (at 25 °C [77 °F], 100 kPa). (what is ?) Infobox references

Platinum diselenide is a transition metal dichalcogenide with the formula PtSe_{2}. It is a layered substance that can be split into layers down to three atoms thick. PtSe_{2} can behave as a metalloid or as a semiconductor depending on the thickness.

== Synthesis ==
Minozzi was the first to report synthesising platinum diselenide from the elements in 1909.

Platinum diselenide can be formed by heating thin foils of platinum in selenium vapour at 400 °C.

A platinum 111 surface exposed to selenium vapour at 270 °C forms a monolayer of PtSe_{2}.

In addition to these selenization methods, PtSe_{2} can be made by precipitation in water solution of Pt(IV) treated with hydrogen selenide, or by heating platinum tetrachloride with elemental selenium.

== Natural occurrence ==
Platinum diselenide occurs naturally as the mineral Sudovikovite. It was named after Russian petrologist, N.G. Sudovikov who lived from 1903 to 1966. The mineral's hardness is 2 to 2 1/2. Sudovikovite was found in the Srednyaya Padma mine, Velikaya Guba uranium-vanadium deposit, Zaonezhye peninsula, Karelia Republic, Russia.

== Properties ==
Platinum diselenide forms crystals in the cadmium iodide structure. This means that the substance forms layers. Each of the monolayers has a central bed of platinum atoms, with a sheet of selenium atoms above and below. This structure is also called "1T" and has an trigonal structure. The layers are only weakly bonded together, and it is possible to exfoliate layers to bilayers or monolayers.

In bulk the material is semi-metallic, but when reduced to few layers it becomes a semiconductor. The conductivity of the bulk material is 620,000 S/m.

The XPS spectrum shows a peak at 72.3 eV from Pt 4f core, and also has peaks from Pt 5p_{3/2} and Se 3d_{3/2} and 3d_{5/2} at 55.19and 54.39 eV.

Phonon vibrations are designated by the infrared active A_{2u} (Se vibrating out of plane opposite to Pt), E_{u} (in layer vibration, Se opposite to Pt), and Raman active A_{1g} (Se top and bottom atoms moving out of plane in opposite directions 205 cm^{−1}), and E_{g} (In plane, top and bottom Se atoms moving opposite 175 cm^{−1}). In the Raman spectrum, the A_{1g} is lessened when stimulated emissions polarised perpendicular to the incoming rays are measured. The E_{g} mode is red-shifted when more layers are stacked. (166 cm^{−1} for bilayer and 155 cm^{−1} for bulk material) The A_{1g} emission only has a slight change when thickness varies.

The band gap is calculated as 1.2 eV for monolayers, and 0.21 eV for bilayers. For a trylayer or thicker the substance loses a bandgap and becomes semimetallic.

PtSe_{2} can change its conductance in the presence of particular gases, such as nitrogen dioxide. Within a few seconds, NO_{2} absorbs on the surface of the PtSe_{2} material and lowers the resistance. When the gas is absent, high resistance returns again in about a minute.

The Seebeck coefficient of PtSe_{2} is 40 μV/K.

Although pristine platinum diselenide is nonmagnetic, the presence of platinum vacancies and strain were predicted to induce magnetism. Later magneto-transport studies have indeed shown that defective PtSe_{2} exhibits magnetic properties. Due to RKKY interaction between magnetic Pt-vacancies, this results in layer-dependent ferromagnetic or anti-ferromagnetic behavior.

Monolayers of platinum diselenide show helical spin texture, which is not expected for centrosymmetric materials such as this. This property could be due to a local dipole induced Rashba effect. It means that PtSe_{2} is a potential spintronics material.

== Reactions ==
Water can physisorb to the surface of platinum diselenide with an energy of −0.19 eV, and similarly for oxygen with energy −0.13 eV. Water and oxygen do not react at room temperature, because significant energy would be required to break apart the molecules.

== Comparison ==
Palladium diselenide has a different modified pyrite structure. Palladium ditelluride has a similar structure to platinum diselenide. Platinum disulfide is a semiconductor, and platinum ditelluride is metallic in nature.

More complex substances with platinum and selenium also exist, including the quaternary chalcogenides Rb_{2}Pt_{3}USe_{6} and Cs_{2}Pt_{3}USe_{6}

Jacutingaite is a ternary platinum selenide HgPtSe_{3}.

== Use ==
Platinum diselenide can be utilized for boardband photodetector up to mid-infrared (MIR) region with stability in ambient condition. Also it can work as a catalyst, and can be built into field effect transistors.

Combined with graphene it can be a photocatalyst, converting water and oxygen to reactive hydroxyl radical and superoxide. This reaction works when photons produce holes and electrons. The holes can neutralise hydroxide to make hydroxyl, and the electrons attach to oxygen to make superoxide. These reactive species can mineralise organic matter.
