= Bear Island (Lake Temagami) =

Island in Nipissing District, Ontario, Canada

Coordinates: 46.98063°N 80.06887°W

Bear Island is an island in Lake Temagami of Northeastern Ontario, Canada. With an area of 4.66 km^{2} (1.80 mi^{2}), it is the second largest island in Lake Temagami after Temagami Island. Much of Bear Island is in Joan Township, a geographic township that also includes the Joan Peninsula to the northwest.

Bear Island is home to the Temagami First Nation and is a portion of the Aboriginal community, the Teme-Augama Anishnabai (the deep water people). It is only a small portion of the Anishnabe's n'Daki Menan (homeland) which includes 10,000 km^{2} (3,900 mi^{2}) of land in the area. Bear Island has had human habitation as early as 1000 BC.

== Geology ==
Bear Island lies at the eastern end of the Temagami Magnetic Anomaly, a buried geological structure that is egg shaped.

== Notable people ==
- Ignace Tonené, former chief.
- White Bear (Wabimakwa)

== See also ==
- List of islands of Lake Temagami
