= Cynthia Peninsula =

Canadian geological feature

Coordinates: 47°08.06′N 80°06.21′W

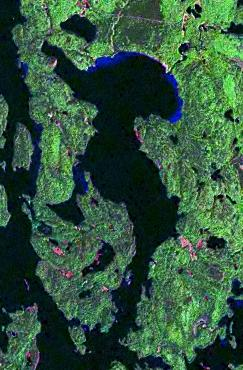
Satellite image of a portion of Lake Temagami and the surrounding landscape. The Cynthia Peninsula is the north–south trending portion of land surrounded by Lake Temagami.

The Cynthia Peninsula is a peninsula in Northeastern Ontario, Canada, situated at the northern end of Lake Temagami. It has a north–south trend surrounded by two portions of Lake Temagami; Ferguson Bay to the east and the North Arm to the west. To its north it is connected to the mainland.

The Cynthia Peninsula is the namesake of Cynthia Township, a geographic township that includes the Cynthia Peninsula.

== See also ==
- McLean Peninsula
- Joan Peninsula
