= Devil Mountain =

Mountain in Ontario, Canada

- Location within Ontario

Highest point
- Elevation: 375 m (1,230 ft)
- Coordinates: 47°5′18″N 80°5′6″W

Geography
- Location: Temagami, Ontario
- Topo map: NTS 41P1 Obabika Lake

Devil Mountain, sometimes mistakenly called Devil's Mountain, is a wooded mountain in the Municipality of Temagami, Northeastern Ontario, Canada. It overlies Devil Island in Lake Temagami with an elevation of 375 m (1,230 ft) above sea level. A short trail from Angus Point leads to an overlook some 76 m (249 ft) above Lake Temagami. From here, Maple Mountain can be seen on a clear day.

Devil Mountain is underlain by Nipissing diabase, which forms a 2.2 billion year old magmatic province with an east–west extent of almost 450 km (280 mi) and a north–south extent of up to 350 km (220 mi).

== See also ==
- Mount Ferguson
