= Nebenegwune =

Chief of the Temagami First Nation in Ontario, Canada, circa 1850

Peter Nebenegwune, commonly known as Nebenegwune, was the head chief (or ogima), of the Temagami First Nation in Ontario, Canada.

== Leadership ==
In the 1850s, Nebenegwune was the chief of the Temagami First Nation. At the time, the nation was loosely organised and Nebenegwune and his family were informally perceived as the leader.

As the Robinson-Huron Treaty was being negotiated in 1850, Nebenegwune did not sign the treaty, as his band was one of three that were represented by Chief Tawgaiwene who signed on behalf of the three nations, including the Temagami band. Nebenegwune did tend to travel to collect treaty payments on behalf of his band, although he did not do so in 1850 and 1856, possibly due to the long distance and small payment.

Nebenegwune leadership was superseded by Kekek.

== Family life ==
Nebenegwune had both brothers and sisters. His children include Angèle, who married Ignace Tonené in 1860 and died in childbirth in 1871.
