= Teme Augama Anishinabek =

First Nation in Ontario, Canada

Bear Island 1
- Indian reserve
- Bear Island Indian Reserve No. 1
- Location within Ontario
- Coordinates: 46°59′N 80°04′W
- Country: Canada
- Province: Ontario
- District: Nipissing
- First Nation: Temagami

Area
  - Land: 2.91 km^{2} (1.12 sq mi)

Population (2011)
  - Total: Incompletely enumerated
- Time zone: UTC-5 (EST)
  - Summer (DST): UTC-4 (EDT)
- Website: www.temagamifirstnation.ca

Teme Augama Anishinabek is located on Bear Island in the heart of Lake Temagami, the second largest in Lake Temagami after Temagami Island. Its community is known as Bear Island 1. Temagami First Nation (TFN) members are status Indians under the Indian Act that live on and off Bear Island.

The Teme-Augama Anishnabai ("Deep Water by the Shore People") are part of the Anishinaabe people, and Bear Island represents only a small portion of the Anishinaabe's Nindakiiminan ("our land"; locally syncoped as Ndakiimnan or "n'daki menan"), which includes over ten thousand square kilometers of land in the area. Some citizens are status Indian (TFN) within the framework of the Indian Act. The majority are not accorded status under the Indian Act, but are still recognized as full community members by the Teme-Augama Anishnabai.

== History ==
=== Human occupation ===
The Teme Augama Anishinabek website states, "The Teme-Augama Anishnabai have utilized the Temagami region of Canada for over 9,000 years."

Scientific evidence of early occupation of the area is sparse. Lake Temagami was free of glacial ice at about 12,150 cal B.P. There is scientific evidence that the Three Pines site, located at Sand Point on the hub of Lake Temagami near Bear Island, could have been occupied after 7,500 B.P. The Three Pines site includes artifacts similar those found elsewhere that dated to the Archaic Period (7,000-3,000 B.P.). There is radiocarbon-dated evidence of human occupation 8488 ± 105 cal B.P. 130 km to the west at Fox Lake and 5791 ± 275 cal B.P. to the north east where the Montreal River empties into Lake Timiskaming.

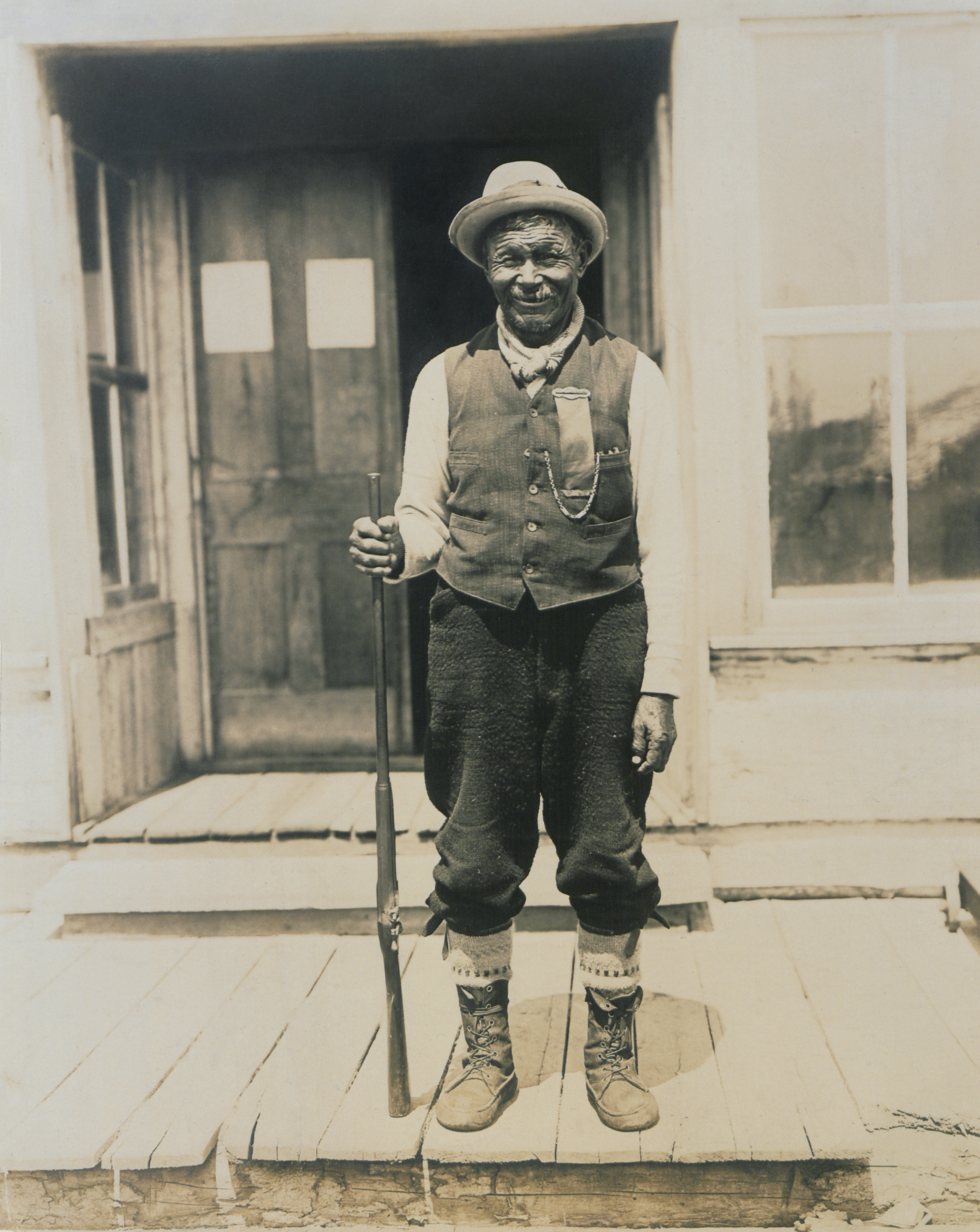
Ignace Tonené in 1909

The Temagami Indigenous people built homes on Bear Island in the 1880s in addition to homes on their own family lands. Early chiefs included White Bear (Wabimakwa), Nebenegwune and François Kabimigwune, who was succeeded by his son Ignace Tonené in 1878, who was succeeded by John Paul who died in 1893, leaving Ignace Tonené in power until 1910 when he gave way to his younger brother Frank White Bear.

In 1943, Bear Island was purchased by the Department of Indian Affairs from the Province of Ontario, for the sum of $3,000.00, in order to be designated as a permanent reserve.

The Temagami First Nation refused to accept Bear Island as a reserve until they were denied housing subsidy funds in 1968 until it was agreed, under duress, that Bear Island would become an official Reserve in accordance with the Indian Act of Canada.

Official reserve status was granted in 1971 and the establishment of the Band Office occurred shortly after in the former Department of Lands and Forests building which had been constructed in approximately 1903.

Maple Mountain in Lady Evelyn-Smoothwater Provincial Park is a sacred site of the Temagami First Nation. The Teme-Augama Anishnabai call the mountain Chee-bay-jing, meaning "the place where the spirits go". It is considered the most sacred and powerful place within their realm.

=== Land claims ===
In 1973, The Teme-Augama Anishnabai exercised a land caution against development on the Crown land of 10,000 square kilometres-most of the Temagami area. The attorney-general of Ontario pursued legal action against the Band for this caution. The Teme-Augama Anishnabai lost this court case in 1984 and proceeded with an appeal to the Supreme Court.

In 1988, the Ontario Minister of Natural Resources, Vince Kerrio approved the expansion of the Red Squirrel logging road, directly through Anishinaabe territory. This prompted a series of roadblocks by the Teme-Augama Anishnabai and by environmentalists in 1988-1989.

In 1991, the Teme-Augama Anishnabai and the Ontario Government created the Wendaban Stewardship Authority to manage the four townships near the logging road. The committee eventually dissolved.

In August 1991, the Teme-Augama Anishnabai lost the land caution, though it was determined that Ontario and Canada have an outstanding fiduciary obligation for unfulfilled Robinson Huron Treaty obligations to which the Teme-Augama Anishnabai have been illegally adhered to. The Teme-Augama Anishnabai failed appeal in 1994 eventually lead to the land caution being lifted.

== The reserve ==
The reserve is situated on a one square mile island in the pristine Temagami Wilderness and Bear Island is home to over 200 permanent residents out of a total of over 500 registered members. Community Days, held in late summer each year, bring back a large part of the full membership as it is an opportunity to renew friendships and family ties and participate in annual Band Council elections.

The Band Council of Temagami First Nation is currently composed of Chief Arnold Paul, Second Chief John Turner, Councillors: Micheal Paul, Wayne Potts, Alice Moore, Jamie Friday, Jamie Saville and Doug Mckenzie Sr. The council was elected in July 2017 for a 3 year Term.
