= White Bear (Wabimakwa) =

First Nation's Chief

- Wabimakwa

Temagami First Nation Chief

Personal details
- Died: 1870

White Bear (also known as Wabimakwa, died 1870) was a Temagami First Nation chief.

He was the grandfather of Ignace Tonené. Both White Bear Lake and White Bear Forest were named after him.

== Family life ==
White Bear and his wife Mrs White Bear had a son François Kabimigwune (died 1880). François Kabimigwune's son (and White Bear's grandson) was Ignace Tonené and was born in 1840 or 41, and died in 1916.

He was a trader in furs and in 1858 he supplied the Hudson's Bay Company with seed potatoes.

== Temagami leadership ==
White Bear was the chief of Temagami First Nation when white settlers arrived in Canada.

He lived on the northwest shore of White Bear Lake (now Cassels Lake), which was named after him.

== Death and legacy ==
White Bear died in 1870.

White Bear Forest and White Bear Lake are named after White Bear.

== See also ==
- Bear Island (Lake Temagami)
