= Mount Ferguson (Ontario) =

Mountain in Ontario, Canada

- Location within Ontario

Highest point
- Elevation: 415 m (1,362 ft)
- Coordinates: 47°8′11″N 80°3′31″W

Geography
- Location: Temagami, Ontario
- Topo map: NTS 41P1 Obabika Lake

Mount Ferguson, sometimes called Ferguson Mountain, is a mountain in the Municipality of Temagami, Northeastern Ontario, Canada. It overlooks Ferguson Bay of Lake Temagami with an elevation of 415 m (1,362 ft) above sea level, making it one of the highest mountains in the area. Mount Ferguson is situated near the boundary of geographic townships Cynthia and Aston.

The mountain is named after Peter A. Ferguson, a gold prospector from the town of Mattawa who staked mining claims on Mount Ferguson in the 1880s. He is also the namesake for Ferguson Bay, Ferguson Island and Ferguson Point. A fire lookout tower set up by the Department of Lands and Forests (now the Ministry of Natural Resources and Forestry) had formerly occupied the summit of Mount Ferguson. Dismantling of the fire tower took place in around 1975 after being abandoned since 1966.

Like the other highest peaks of this area, Mount Ferguson is underlain by Nipissing diabase. This forms a 2.2 billion year old magmatic province with an east–west extent of almost 450 km (280 mi) and a north–south extent of up to 350 km (220 mi).

== See also ==
- Devil Mountain
