= List of islands of Lake Temagami =

Lake Temagami in Northeastern Ontario, Canada, has 1,258 surveyed and numbered islands, a handful of which are officially named:

== Numbered islands ==
Name	Coordinates	References
Island 1	47°1′45″N 79°51′45″W	Garmin Ltd.
Island 2	47°1′41″N 79°51′49″W	Garmin Ltd.
Island 3	47°1′36″N 79°51′50″W	Garmin Ltd.
Island 4	47°1′32″N 79°51′27″W	Garmin Ltd.
Island 5	47°2′37″N 79°50′51″W	Garmin Ltd.
Island 7	47°1′48″N 79°50′29″W	Garmin Ltd.
Island 10	47°2′21″N 79°50′11″W	Garmin Ltd.
Island 11	47°2′20″N 79°50′8″W	Garmin Ltd.
Island 13	47°2′25″N 79°50′4″W	Garmin Ltd.
Island 22	47°3′4″N 79°49′37″W	Garmin Ltd.
Island 23	47°2′59″N 79°49′19″W	Garmin Ltd.
Island 26	47°3′35″N 79°48′30″W	Garmin Ltd.
Island 27	47°3′30″N 79°48′40″W	Garmin Ltd.
Island 28	47°3′35″N 79°48′20″W	Garmin Ltd.
Island 30	47°3′34″N 79°48′12″W	Garmin Ltd.
Island 31	47°3′36″N 79°47′59″W	Garmin Ltd.
Island 38	47°3′36″N 79°47′46″W	Garmin Ltd.
Island 39	47°3′25″N 79°48′20″W	Garmin Ltd.
Island 48	47°2′50″N 79°49′50″W	Garmin Ltd.
Island 50	47°3′8″N 79°50′30″W	Garmin Ltd.
Island 59	47°1′28″N 79°53′30″W	Garmin Ltd.
Island 61	47°1′13″N 79°54′1″W	Garmin Ltd.
Island 65	47°2′3″N 79°51′34″W	Garmin Ltd.
Island 66	47°2′1″N 79°51′35″W	Garmin Ltd.
Island 67	47°1′59″N 79°51′50″W	Garmin Ltd.
Island 76	47°1′36″N 79°52′30″W	Garmin Ltd.
Island 78	47°1′52″N 79°52′24″W	Garmin Ltd.
Island 79	47°1′49″N 79°52′34″W	Garmin Ltd.
Island 81	47°1′55″N 79°52′32″W	Garmin Ltd.
Island 89	47°1′59″N 79°52′54″W	Garmin Ltd.
Island 90	47°1′44″N 79°53′47″W	Garmin Ltd.
Island 91	47°1′41″N 79°53′54″W	Garmin Ltd.
Island 99	47°1′43″N 79°54′23″W	Garmin Ltd.
Island 108	47°2′31″N 79°51′57″W	Garmin Ltd.
Island 111	47°2′22″N 79°52′31″W	Garmin Ltd.
Island 175 (Ship Island)	47°59′6″N 79°58′39″W	Garmin Ltd.
Island 364	46°49′53″N 80°6′48″W	Garmin Ltd.
Island 388 (Papoose Island)	46°50′46″N 80°8′19″W	Garmin Ltd.
Island 665 (Chimo Island)	46°55′30″N 80°5′5″W	Garmin Ltd.
Island 888	46°51′46″N 80°5′3″W	Garmin Ltd.
Island 1086 (Stinking Island)	47°0′26″N 80°4′57″W	Garmin Ltd.
Island 1088 (Cayuga Island)	47°0′6″N 80°6′8″W	Garmin Ltd.
Island 1104	47°0′46″N 80°5′43″W	Garmin Ltd.

== Officially named islands ==
Name	Coordinates	References
Alexander Island (Island 992)	46°58′35″N 80°5′43″W	Canadian Geographical Names Database, Garmin Ltd.
Bear Island (Island 964)	46°58′58″N 80°4′5″W	Canadian Geographical Names Database, Garmin Ltd.
Beaver Island (Island 1205)	47°9′15″N 80°8′25″W	Canadian Geographical Names Database, Garmin Ltd.
Bell Island (Island 25)	47°3′9″N 79°49′7″W	Canadian Geographical Names Database, Garmin Ltd.
Boat Islands (Islands 185–186)	46°59′8″N 79°59′16″W	Canadian Geographical Names Database, Garmin Ltd.
Broom Island (Island 158)	47°0′34″N 79°56′2″W	Canadian Geographical Names Database, Garmin Ltd.
Caldwell Island (Island 86)	47°1′39″N 79°53′16″W	Canadian Geographical Names Database, Garmin Ltd.
Campfire Island (Island 39)	47°3′26″N 79°48′19″W	Canadian Geographical Names Database, Garmin Ltd.
Cattle Island (Island 849)	46°57′18″N 80°5′15″W	Canadian Geographical Names Database, Garmin Ltd.
Deer Island (Island 1199)	47°9′14″N 80°7′42″W	Canadian Geographical Names Database, Garmin Ltd.
Denedus Island (Island 300)	46°56′37″N 80°0′30″W	Canadian Geographical Names Database, Garmin Ltd.
Devil Island (Island 1147)	47°5′1″N 80°5′34″W	Canadian Geographical Names Database, Garmin Ltd.
Ferguson Island	47°2′3″N 79°51′6″W	Canadian Geographical Names Database
Forestry Island (Island 34)	47°3′42″N 79°47′42″W	Canadian Geographical Names Database, Garmin Ltd.
Garden Island (Island 981)	46°59′54″N 80°4′47″W	Canadian Geographical Names Database, Garmin Ltd.
Granny Island (Island 1158)	47°4′25″N 80°6′11″W	Canadian Geographical Names Database, Garmin Ltd.
High Rock Island (Island 312)	46°55′12″N 80°2′39″W	Canadian Geographical Names Database, Garmin Ltd.
Horseshoe Island (Island 1197)	47°8′37″N 80°7′7″W	Canadian Geographical Names Database, Garmin Ltd.
Kabekwabika Island (Island 765)	46°53′55″N 80°4′4″W	Canadian Geographical Names Database, Garmin Ltd.
Long Island (Island 1106)	47°1′23″N 80°5′20″W	Canadian Geographical Names Database, Garmin Ltd.
McMillan Island (Island 891)	46°52′43″N 80°3′9″W	Canadian Geographical Names Database, Garmin Ltd.
Moore Island (Island 340)	46°58′9″N 80°3′38″W	Canadian Geographical Names Database, Garmin Ltd.
Narrows Island (Island 660)	46°55′59″N 80°6′7″W	Canadian Geographical Names Database, Garmin Ltd.
O'Connor Island (Island 49)	47°2′54″N 79°50′7″W	Canadian Geographical Names Database, Garmin Ltd.
Ogama Island (Island 843)	46°57′31″N 80°3′45″W	Canadian Geographical Names Database, Garmin Ltd.
Rabbitnose Island (Island 1119)	47°1′49″N 80°4′59″W	Canadian Geographical Names Database, Garmin Ltd.
Redpine Island (Island 1173)	47°5′45″N 80°5′53″W	Canadian Geographical Names Database, Garmin Ltd.
Smoothrock Island (Island 584)	46°55′17″N 80°6′41″W	Canadian Geographical Names Database, Garmin Ltd.
Snake Island (Island 1105)	47°1′6″N 80°5′15″W	Canadian Geographical Names Database, Garmin Ltd.
Temagami Island (Island 234)	46°57′36″N 80°2′33″W	Canadian Geographical Names Database, Garmin Ltd.
Turner Island (Island 342)	46°57′53″N 80°4′6″W	Canadian Geographical Names Database, Garmin Ltd.
Wingfoot Island (Island 864)	46°57′37″N 80°5′53″W	Canadian Geographical Names Database, Garmin Ltd.
