= Copperfields Mine =

Mine on Temagami island, Ontario, Canada

- Location in Ontario

Location
- Location: Temagami, Ontario, Canada; 46°57′44.7012″N 80°02′16.0259″W

Production
- Products: copper, silver, gold
- Production: 80 million pounds of copper, 230,028 ounces of silver and 13,271 ounces of gold

History
- Opened: 1955
- Closed: 1972

Copperfields Mine, originally known as Temagami Mine, is an abandoned copper and silver mine on Temagami Island in Lake Temagami, Ontario, Canada. The mine opened in 1955 and comprises both underground and surface workings within a sulfide ore body. Situated in Phyllis Township, the mine produced 34,000,000 dollars Canadian with 80 million pounds of copper, 230,028 ounces of silver and 13,271 ounces of gold. It was considered to be the largest deposit of nearly pure chalcopyrite ever discovered in Canada. A mill was not initially needed because the ore was 28% copper. The mine closed in 1972 and is now flooded by water. Ruins of the Copperfields mill are present as foundations. It is possible to find mineral specimens in the spoil heaps of the old mine, such as chalcopyrite, pyrite, bornite, malachite, dolomite, hessite, merenskyite, millerite, palladium, quartz and others. The Lake Temagami Access Road was created to ship ore from the mine site.

Copper-nickel mineralization at the mine is associated with semi-massive to disseminated pyrite at the lower contact between altered gabbro and rhyolite of the Temagami Greenstone Belt. The gabbro is steeply dipping, approximately 250 m thick and has a strike extent of at least 5 km. The intensity of mineralization varies greatly but is present over most of the defined strike length of the gabbro. Copper is associated with chalcopyrite. Nickel is associated with millerite, gersdorffite, linnaeite and cobalt-nickel sulfarsenides.

Copperfields Mine is the discovery site of a bright white mineral called temagamite. It was discovered in 1973.

== See also ==
- List of mines in Temagami
- Volcanism of Canada
- Volcanism of Eastern Canada
