= McLean Peninsula =

Coordinates: 46°53.10′N 80°06.14′W

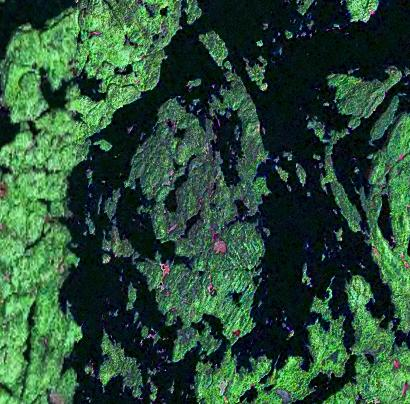
Southern end of Lake Temagami with the McLean Peninsula in middle.

The McLean Peninsula is a peninsula in Northeastern Ontario, Canada, situated at the southern end of Lake Temagami. It is the largest portion of land entirely surrounded by Lake Temagami and is connected to the mainland in the south by an isthmus.

Camp Chimo, a residential summer camp, is situated on the northern end of the peninsula where it lies in the central portion of Lake Temagami.

== See also ==
- Cynthia Peninsula
- Joan Peninsula
