= Joan Peninsula =

Peninsula in Ontario, Canada

Coordinates: 47°02.21′N 80°06.46′W

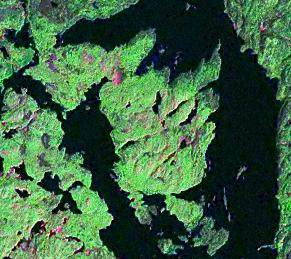
Satellite image of a portion of Lake Temagami and the surrounding landscape. The Joan Peninsula is in the middle.

The Joan Peninsula is a peninsula in Northeastern Ontario, Canada, situated in the central portion of Lake Temagami. It is surrounded by three portions of Lake Temagami; Granny Bay to the north, the Northwest Arm to the west and another arm of Lake Temagami to the east that connects with Granny Bay. The peninsula is connected to the mainland in the northwest.

The Joan Peninsula is the namesake of Joan Township, a geographic township that includes the Joan Peninsula.

== See also ==
- Cynthia Peninsula
- McLean Peninsula
