= Keewaydin (camp) =

Summer camp in Nipissing District, Ontario, Canada and Vermont, United States

Keewaydin Logo

The Keewaydin Foundation is an organization that manages a number of summer canoe camps based in Ontario and Vermont, as well as an environmental educational center. In Algonquin, Keewaydin is the Northwest wind, considered to be the bearer of good fortune and fair weather.

== History ==
In 1894 A.S. Gregg Clarke established a canoe tripping camp in northern Maine. Having come to realize that the timber industry and tourism had spoiled Maine for canoe tripping, Clarke set up a temporary camp on Lake Temagami in Ontario in 1903.

In 1904 Clarke founded a permanent camp on the south end of Devil Island, calling it Keewaydin. To distinguish it from a camp that would be subsequently created, it came to be called Keewaydin Temagami.

In 1910 a camp for younger boys, called Keewaydin Dunmore, was founded on Lake Dunmore in Vermont and in 1921 a new girls-only camp, called Songadeewin (meaning "strong of heart"), was founded on Lake Willoughby, also in Vermont.

The diverging paths of Keewaydin Temagami, Keewaydin Dunmore and Songadeewin has resulted in various owners and unique histories.

In 1973 the Keewaydin Environmental Education Center was founded at Keewaydin Dunmore, with the goal of educating Vermont school students about the natural world.

== Notable campers ==
- Michael Eisner
- Charles O'Neill
- John McPhee
- Micah Diamond (son of Neil Diamond)

== Notable staff ==
- Archie Belaney, commonly known as Grey Owl, who worked as a guide at Keewaydin Temagami in the summers of 1910 and 1911.
