= Anima Nipissing River =

Anima Nipissing River Red Squirrel River
- Location of the mouth of the Anima Nipissing River in Ontario

Location
- Country: Canada
- Province: Ontario
- Region: Northeastern Ontario
- District: Nipissing
- Municipality: Temagami

Physical characteristics
- Source: Anima Nipissing Lake
  - location: Banting Township
  - coordinates: 47°15′34″N 79°54′22″W
  - elevation: 300 m (980 ft)
- Mouth: Lake Temagami
  - location: Aston Township
  - coordinates: 47°9′44″N 80°3′51″W
  - elevation: 300 m (980 ft)
- Length: 14 km (8.7 mi)

The Anima Nipissing River, also known as the Red Squirrel River, is a river in Nipissing District, Ontario, Canada. It is situated in Aston and Banting townships of the municipality of Temagami.

== Course ==
The Anima Nipissing River begins at the south end of Anima Nipissing Lake at an elevation of 300 m (980 ft). It flows southwest into McLean Lake then comes out at Red Squirrel Road where it continues along this road for about 2.5 km (1.6 mi). The river continues south into Red Squirrel Lake and then exits at the lake's northwest end where it travels some 3.2 km (2.0 mi) to its mouth at Ferguson Bay of Lake Temagami. The Anima Nipissing River has a total length of about 14 km (8.7 mi).

== See also ==
- List of rivers of Ontario
