= Palladium(II) oxide =

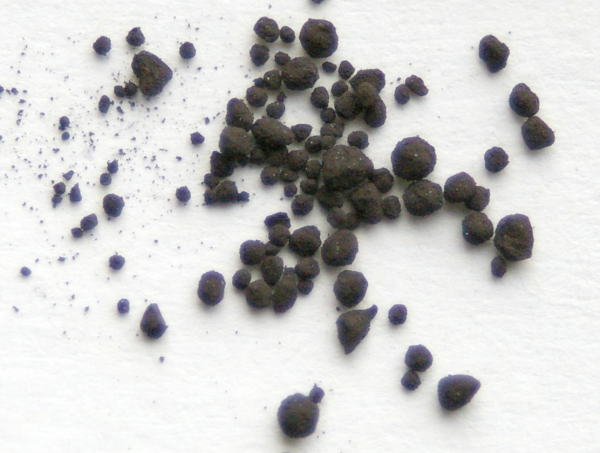

Names
- Other names Palladium monoxide

Identifiers
CAS Number	1314-08-5
3D model (JSmol)	Interactive image
ChemSpider	66602
ECHA InfoCard	100.013.836
PubChem CID	73974
UNII	B30901Q32J
CompTox Dashboard (EPA)	DTXSID90894899
- InChI: InChI=1S/O.Pd/q-2;+2 Key: JQPTYAILLJKUCY-UHFFFAOYSA-N; InChI=1/O.Pd/q-2;+2 Key: JQPTYAILLJKUCY-UHFFFAOYAD
- SMILES: [Pd+2].[O-2]

Properties
Chemical formula	PdO
Molar mass	122.42 g/mol
Appearance	greenish-black powder
Density	8.3 g/cm^{3}
Melting point	750 °C (1,380 °F; 1,020 K) decomposes
Solubility in water	insoluble
Solubility	insoluble in acid slightly soluble in aqua regia

Hazards
Flash point	Non-flammable

Related compounds
Other anions	Palladium sulfide
Other cations	Nickel(II) oxide
- Except where otherwise noted, data are given for materials in their standard state (at 25 °C [77 °F], 100 kPa). verify (what is ?) Infobox references

Palladium(II) oxide is the inorganic compound of formula PdO. It is the only well characterised oxide of palladium. It is prepared by treating the metal with oxygen. Above about 900 °C, the oxide reverts to palladium metal and oxygen gas. It is not attacked by acids.

== Structure ==
The structure of PdO is tetragonal (P42/mmc) a = 3.044, c = 5.328 Å. The Pd atoms are square planar as expected for a d^{8} metal ion and the oxygen atoms are approximately tetrahedral. The closest Pd–Pd distance is 3.044 Å and is almost within the range which can be considered a bonding distance.

== Preparation ==
PdO is often obtained as a poorly defined material that is generated for applications as a catalyst. Palladium oxide is prepared by heating palladium sponge metal in oxygen at 350 °C.

2 Pd + O_{2} → 2 PdO

The oxide is obtained as a black powder. The oxide also may be prepared specially for catalytic use by heating variously a mixture of palladium(II) chloride and potassium nitrate,

2 PdCl_{2} + 4 KNO_{3} → 2 PdO + 4 KCl + 4 NO_{2} + O_{2} (possible reaction)

or the product of dissolving palladium in aqua regia, followed by the addition of sodium nitrate at 600 °C. A hydrated form of the oxide (which dissolves in acid) can be prepared by precipitation from solution, for example, by hydrolysis of palladium nitrate or reaction of a soluble palladium compound with a strong base. The brown hydrated oxide converts to black anhydrous oxide on heating. Its susceptibility to attack by acids decreases at lower water content.

The hydrated oxide, PdO^{.}nH_{2}O can be produced as a dark-yellow precipitate by adding alkali to a solution of palladium nitrate, Pd(NO_{3})_{2}.

== Applications ==
Materials called palladium oxide are useful catalysts for catalytic hydrogenation in organic synthesis.
