= Sand Point (Lake Temagami) =

- Location within Ontario

Geography
- Coordinates: 47°00′13″N 80°07′13″W
- Adjacent to: Lake Temagami
- Highest elevation: 316 m (1037 ft)

Administration
- Canada
- Province: Ontario
- District: Nipissing
- Municipality: Temagami

Sand Point is a cape at the entrance to the northwest arm of Lake Temagami in geographic Joan Township in the municipality of Temagami, Nipissing District in Northeastern Ontario, Canada. The cape has a large sandy beach on its south side, and a small campground on its east side. The cape lies within the Skyline Reserve ecological reserve.
