= Platinum(II) sulfide =

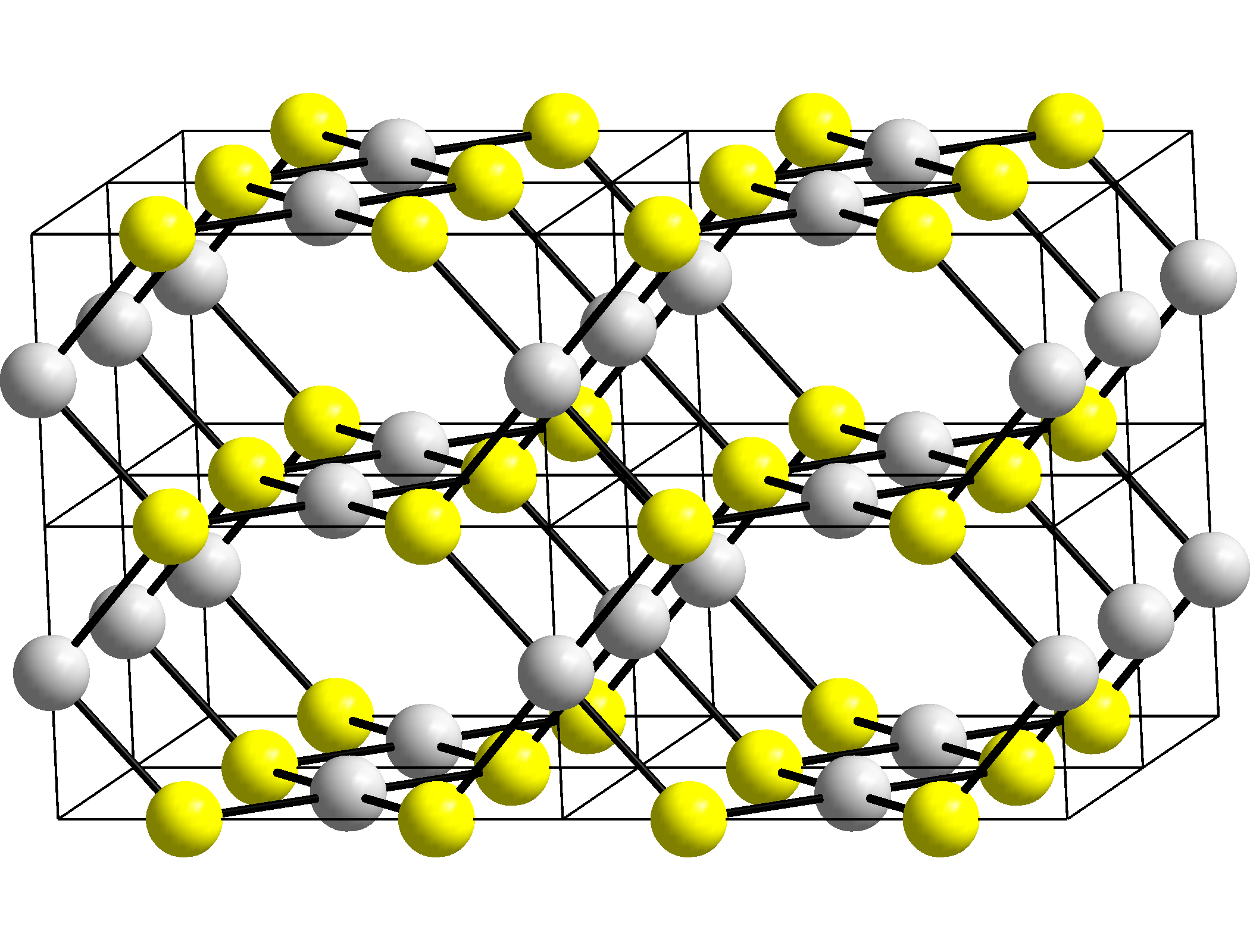

Names
- IUPAC name Platinum(II) sulfide

Identifiers
CAS Number	12038-20-9
3D model (JSmol)	Interactive image
ChemSpider	23349339
ECHA InfoCard	100.031.692
EC Number	234-875-7
PubChem CID	82861
CompTox Dashboard (EPA)	DTXSID0065199
- InChI: InChI=1S/Pt.S Key: JOKPITBUODAHEN-UHFFFAOYSA-N
- SMILES: S=[Pt]

Properties
Chemical formula	PtS
Molar mass	227.14 g·mol^{−1}
Appearance	green solid

Related compounds
Related compounds	Platinum(IV) sulfide
- Except where otherwise noted, data are given for materials in their standard state (at 25 °C [77 °F], 100 kPa). Infobox references

Platinum(II) sulfide is the inorganic compound with the formula PtS. It is a green solid, insoluble in all solvents. The compound adopts an unusual structure, being composed of square planar Pt and tetrahedral sulfide centers. A related compound is platinum disulfide, PtS_{2}.
