= Verbeekite =

Palladium diselenide mineral

Verbeekite is a rare mineral consisting of palladium diselenide PdSe_{2}. This transition metal dichalcogenide has an unusual monoclinic structure, with pairs of selenium atoms existing as dimers forming layers between palladium atom sheets. Unit cell dimensions are: a = 6.710, b = 4.154, c = 8.914 Å, β = 92.42 °, V = 248.24 Å^{3}. Palladium diselenide has five polymorphs. Verbeekite can be synthesised at 11.5 GPa pressure and 1300 °C.

Monolayer PdSe_{2} has been predicted as a semiconductor and synthesized as an electronic material.

The mineral was discovered in 2002 from the Musonoi Cu-Co-Mn-U mine (Kolwezi), in the Democratic Republic of the Congo. Verbeekite was named after geologist Théodore Verbeek who studied minerals at that mine between 1955 and 1967.
