= Platinum disulfide =

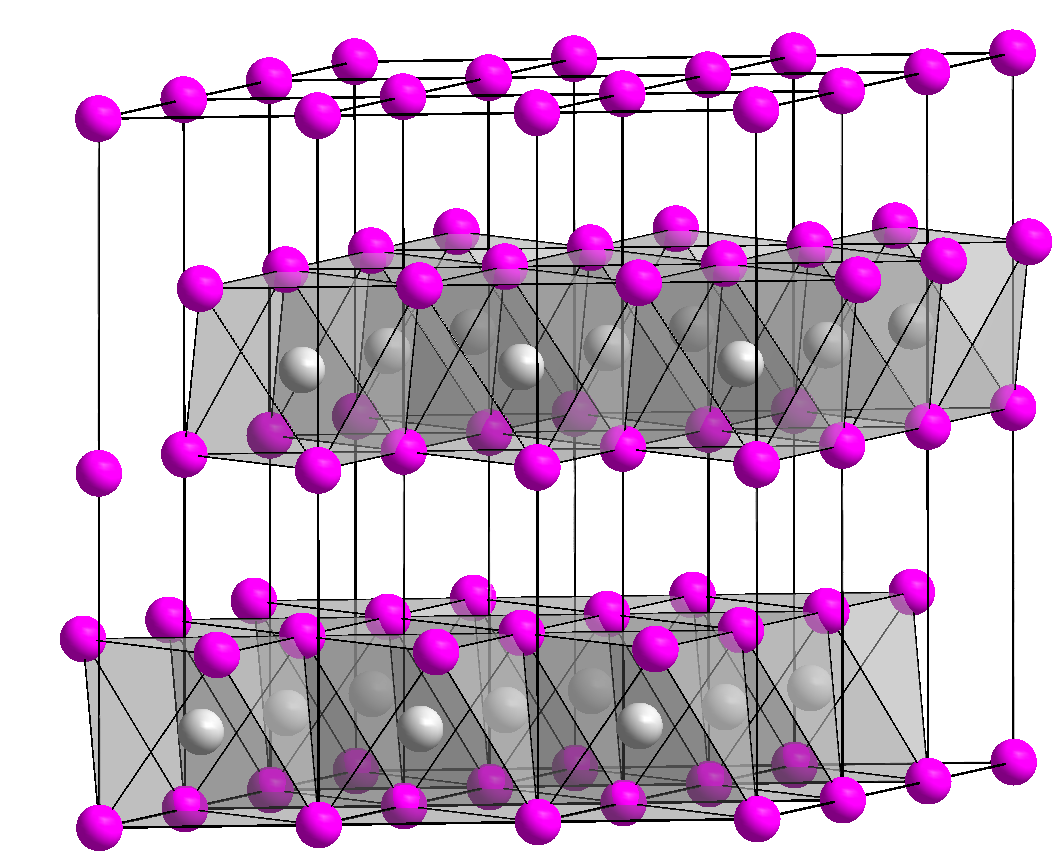

Names
- IUPAC name Platinum(IV) sulfide
- Other names Platinic sulfide Platinum disulfide dithioxoplatinum

Identifiers
CAS Number	12038-21-0
3D model (JSmol)	Interactive image
ChemSpider	14408490
ECHA InfoCard	100.031.693
EC Number	234-876-2
PubChem CID	82862
CompTox Dashboard (EPA)	DTXSID2065200
- InChI: InChI=1S/Pt.2S Key: RKNFJIIYAUSTJA-UHFFFAOYSA-N
- SMILES: S=[Pt]=S

Properties
Chemical formula	PtS_{2}
Molar mass	252.9 g/mol
Appearance	black solid
Density	7.86 g/cm^{3}

Related compounds
Related compounds	Platinum(II) sulfide
- Except where otherwise noted, data are given for materials in their standard state (at 25 °C [77 °F], 100 kPa). Infobox references

Platinum disulfide is the inorganic compound with the formula PtS_{2}. It is a black, semiconducting solid, which is insoluble in all solvents. The compound adopts the cadmium iodide structure, being composed of sheets of octahedral Pt and pyramidal sulfide centers. Single crystals are grown by chemical vapor transport using phosphorus as the transport agent. A related compound is platinum(II) sulfide, PtS.
