= Temagami Island =

Island in Ontario, Canada

Coordinates: 46.9604°N 80.0356°W

Temagami Island, formerly spelt as Timagami Island, is an island in Lake Temagami in Northeastern Ontario, Canada. It is the largest island within the lake, with Bear Island coming second. The island has many hiking trails that lead into the old-growth forest that is a mix of large white and red pine trees. Temagami Mine, later known as Copperfields Mine, was a copper mine that opened on Temagami Island in 1954. It was considered to be the largest deposit of nearly pure chalcopyrite ever discovered in Canada. The mine closed in 1972.

Temagami Island lies within n'Daki Menan, the homeland of the Teme-Augama Anishnabai, which covers almost 4,000 square miles (10,000 km^{2}).

Temagami Island is also home to Camp Wabikon, an overnight summer camp for youth ages 6–16.

A bright white palladium mercury telluride mineral was discovered on Temagami Island in 1973 called temagamite, named after its discovery locality in Copperfields Mine, originally known as Temagami Mine.

== See also ==
- List of islands of Lake Temagami
