= Merenskyite =

Rare telluride / bismuthinide mineral

General
- Category: Telluride mineral
- Formula: (Pd,Pt)(Te,Bi)_{2}
- IMA symbol: Mrk
- Strunz classification: 2.EA.20
- Crystal system: Trigonal
- Crystal class: Hexagonal scalenohedral (3̅m); H-M symbol: (3̅m)
- Space group: P3̅m1
- Unit cell: a = 3.978(1) Å, c = 5.125(2) Å; Z = 1

Identification
- Color: White, grayish white
- Crystal habit: Microscopic inclusions, intergrowths with other Pd–Pt minerals
- Mohs scale hardness: 3.5
- Diaphaneity: Opaque
- Specific gravity: 8.547
- Pleochroism: Weak, white to grayish white in air under reflected light

Merenskyite is a rare telluride / bismuthinide mineral with the chemical formula (Pd,Pt)(Te,Bi)_{2}. It is an opaque white to light gray metallic mineral that occurs as inclusions within other minerals such as chalcopyrite. It crystallizes in the trigonal crystal system.

Merenskyite was first described in 1966 for an occurrence in the Merensky Reef of the Western Bushveld Igneous Complex, South Africa, and named for South African geologist Hans Merensky (1871–1952).
