= Lake Temagami =

Lake in Ontario, Canada

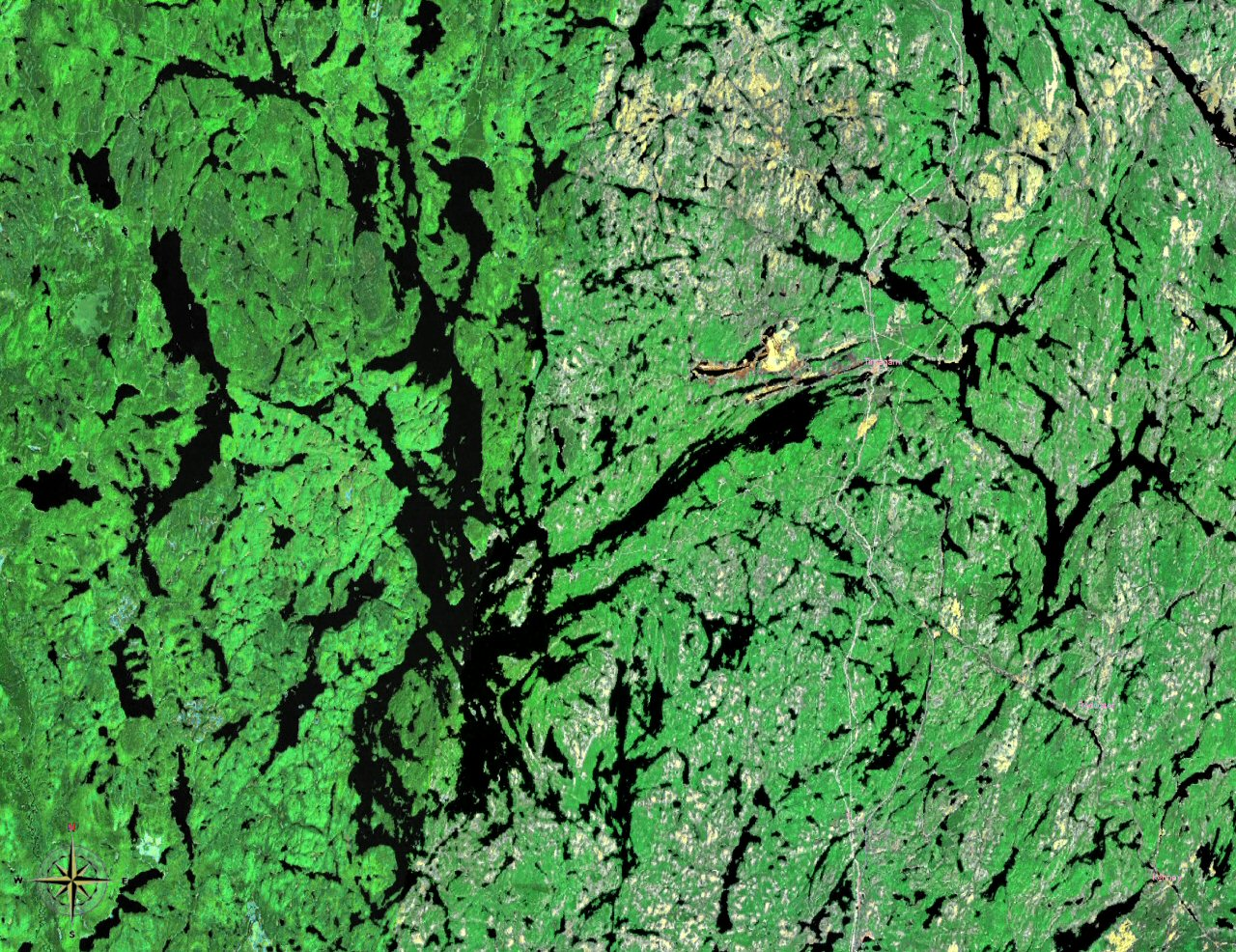
- The lake with its many branches, bays and islands

- Location within Ontario
- Location: Temagami, Ontario
- Coordinates: 46°57′N 80°05′W
- Etymology: Ojibwe dimii-agamiing "tih-MEE-uh-ga-MEENG", meaning "it is deep water by the shore"
- Part of: Great Lakes Basin
- Primary inflows: Anima Nipissing River
- Primary outflows: Temagami River
- Basin countries: Canada
- Max. length: 47 km (29 mi)
- Surface area: 209.71 km^{2} (80.97 sq mi)
- Surface elevation: 293 m (961 ft)
- Islands: ca. 1,259 (Temagami Island)

Lake Temagami, formerly spelled as Lake Timagami, is a lake in Nipissing District in northeastern Ontario, Canada, situated approximately 80 km north of North Bay. The lake's name comes from dimii-agamiing "tih-MEE-uh-guh-MEENG", which means "it is deep water by the shore" in the Ojibwa language.

== Geography ==
The lake is irregularly shaped with long north, northeast and southwest arms, shorter northwest and south arms and several smaller bays. The town of Temagami is located at the end of the northeast arm of the lake. It extends almost 50 km from north to south and about 35 km from east to west. There are approximately 1,259 islands, the largest of which is Temagami Island. The lake's outflow is the Temagami River which in turn flows into the Sturgeon River. A number of peninsulas are associated with the lake, such as the McLean, Cynthia and Joan peninsulas, as well as Sand Point, which separates the Northwest Arm from the rest of the lake.

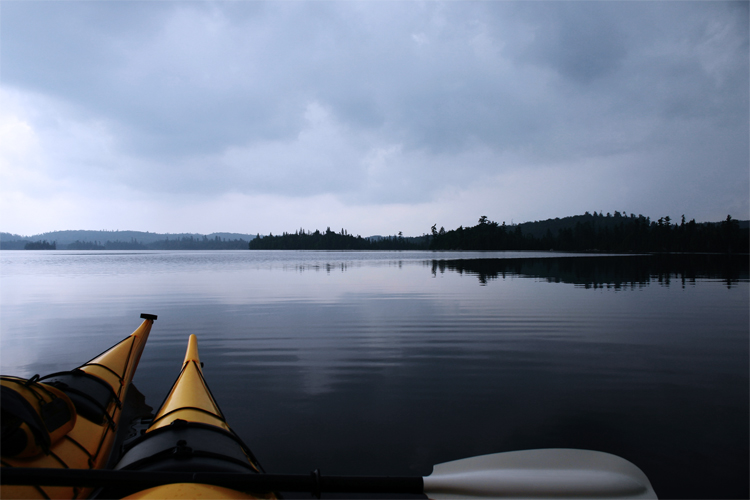
Kayaks on Lake Temagami

The lands surrounding the lake are part of the Canadian Shield, one of the largest single exposure of Precambrian rocks in the world which were formed after the Earth's crust cooled. Part of Lake Temagami lies in the Temagami Magnetic Anomaly, an egg shaped geologic structure stretching from Lake Wanapitei in the west to Bear Island. It has striking similarities to the Sudbury Basin, which is one of the richest mining camps in the world. The hills in the Temagami area are remnants of the oldest mountain ranges in North America, that date back to the Precambrian era. These enormous mountains were taller than any that exist today. The uplifting was accomplished as enormous pressure caused the earth to buckle in a process called folding. Other processes, such as volcanic activity and geologic faulting in which the earth cracks open also contributed to the formation of these mountains. Over millions of years, these enormous mountains were gradually eroded to the land as we know it today in Temagami.

The rocks that form Temagami to this day are igneous, metamorphic and sedimentary. The area has good potential to host diamondiferous kimberlites and more diamond bearing kimberlites may continue to be discovered in the area. The Temagami area also contains some pillow lava about 2 billion years old, indicating that great submarine volcanoes existed during the early stages of the formation of the Earth's crust.

The northeast arm of Lake Temagami is underlain by a strong fault zone of sheared felsic to intermediate metavolcanic rocks that is approximately 1,200 m (3,900 ft) wide. This fault zone, known as the Northeast Arm Deformation Zone, and the associated metavolcanic rocks are associated with the Temagami Greenstone Belt, an Archean greenstone belt characterized by felsic-mafic volcanic rocks.

Lake Temagami and its surrounding lakes provide endless opportunities for canoe camping. There are over 2,000 km of interconnecting canoe routes.

The region contains some of the largest remaining stands of old growth red and white pine forests in Ontario.

== History ==
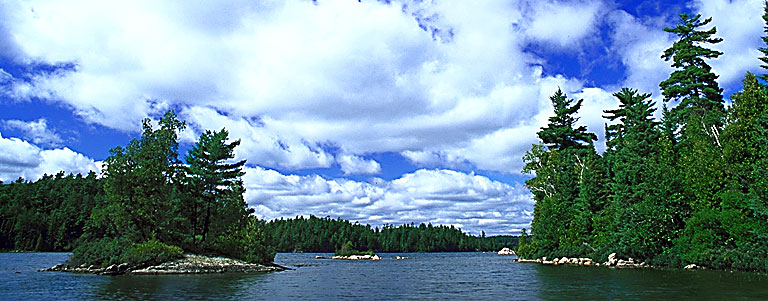
Lake Temagami

In 1834, the Hudson's Bay Company opened a fur trading post on the lake, which operated during the 19th century. The Forest Reserves Act of 1898 established the Temagami Forest Reserve on the shores and adjacent lands of the lake in 1901. It was created to reserve the forests for future logging by restricting settlement. In 1904 it was increased to 15,000 km^{2} (5,800 sq mi). As a result of this reserve, the building of cottages and resorts was only permitted on the lake's islands. This restriction is still in force today. Lake Temagami is popular for cottage vacationing: the number of cottages on Lake Temagami are estimated between 630 and 746. In addition there are 9 youth camps, and 12 commercial lodges.

Keewaydin Canoe Camp is based on Devil Island, in the shadow of Devil Mountain and across from Granny Bay in the northern section of the lake. Keeywaydin, founded in 1892, is one of several camps on Lake Temagami whose focus is on wilderness canoe trips using traditional equipment such as cedar and canvas canoes and wannigans. Since it began running trips in Ontario in 1902, it is the earliest known private business on Temagami besides for the HBC post on Bear Island.

Camp Temagami, or A.L. Cochrane's Camp for boys, was founded in 1903 on an island in the South Arm of Lake Temagami. While Camp Temagami emphasized the importance of the wilderness canoe trip for shaping young men, the camp also developed a robust in-camp program that included athletics and life-guard training, as well as the study of the natural environment and Native American folklore. Camp Temagami offered canoe trips and in-camp activities for boys and young men until its closure in 1972. Camp Temagami was reopened in 2003, on the site of the old Wigwasati and Pays d’en Haut camps. Camp Wigwasati, on the southwest arm, began running canoe trips in the Temagami wilderness in 1930. Camp Wabikon was a vacation lodge opened around 1913 by John Orr, a former hotel operator from Stayner, Ontario, and subsequently operated by his daughter Laura, and then by H.W. Wilson.

Lodge on an island in Lake Temagami about 1948

Lake Temagami's vacation lodges and canoe tripping camps flourished during the early interwar years. Visitors from the cities of Ontario and the United States’ northeast and great lakes regions traveled north on the Timiskaming and Northern Ontario Railway [Ontario Northland Railway], and later on the Ferguson Highway when it opened in 1927. A large passenger steamboat, Belle of Temagami, operated on Lake Temagami from the 1900s to the 1940s and would carry vacationers and campers throughout the lake.

During the late Depression and Second World War, vacation lodges and camps struggled to stay open resulting in and several notable lodges reopening as youth camps. Camp Cayuga reopened in 1940 as the first girls’ camp on the lake. Camp Wabikon reopened as a co-ed youth camp in 1945, making it the first co-ed youth camp on the lake. In the 1950s and 60s, several youth camps opened as co-ed institutions or camps for girls. Camp Wanapitei has been on lake Temagami since 1956, after the previous location on Lake Wanapitei was flooded and was the first co-ed canoe tripping camp on the lake, becoming a full co-ed camp in 1971. It is located in the sandy inlet of the lake. They hold the place for longest trip, as their V2 trip lasts for 52 days, and is meant for 18 year olds, up north in places such as the Mackenzie river, and different northern provinces.

Camp Metagami for girls was founded in the early 1960s as a sister camp to Camp Temagami, but closed shortly afterwards in 1970. Originally an exclusive vacation lodge, Camp White Bear reopened as a co-ed youth camp in 1961. In 1968, Lorien Wilderness took over the Camp Cayuga site and offered co-ed wilderness trips. Located on an island in the hub of the lake, Camp Wabun has run canoe trips in the area since 1933, including trips to Hudson's Bay, and has been co-ed since 1977. In 1985, Camp Northwaters took over the Lorien Wilderness site and offered co-ed wilderness trips, and later single-gender girls’ trips through their Northern Lights Programs for ages 11–14. In 1999, Keewaydin became co-ed. Keeywaydin, Wanapitei, Temagami, and Wabun were boys camps when founded but have since all become co-ed.

Appleby College's northern campus is located on Rabbit Nose island, opened in the mid-1970s it provides a launching point for their Northward Bound program which takes place in January, February, May and June.

A copper mine opened on Temagami Island in 1954 called Temagami Mine. It produced 34,000,000 dollars Canadian and was considered to mine the purest copper ore in Canada. The mine closed in 1972.

== See also ==
- Lakes of Temagami
- List of islands of Lake Temagami
- Bear Island (Lake Temagami)
